= Same-sex marriage in Sweden =

Same-sex marriage has been legal in Sweden since 1 May 2009 following the adoption of a gender-neutral marriage law by the Riksdag on 1 April 2009. Sweden was the second Scandinavian country, the fifth in Europe and the seventh in the world, after the Netherlands, Belgium, Spain, Canada, South Africa and Norway, to open marriage to same-sex couples. Existing registered partnerships, established in 1995, remain in force and can be converted to marriages if the partners so desire, either through a written application or through a formal ceremony. New registered partnerships are no longer able to be entered into and marriage is now the only legally recognized form of union for couples regardless of sex. Polling indicates that an overwhelming majority of Swedes support the legal recognition of same-sex marriage.

On 22 October 2009, the governing board of the Church of Sweden voted 176–62 in favour of allowing its priests to wed same-sex couples in new gender-neutral church ceremonies, including the use of the term "marriage". Same-sex marriages have been performed by the Church since 1 November 2009.

== Cohabitation ==
Laws regarding same-sex partnerships in Europe¹ Marriage Civil union Limited domestic recognition (cohabitation) Unrecognized Constitution limits marriage to opposite-sex couples ¹ May include recent laws or court decisions that have not yet entered into effect.

In 1987, Sweden established a statutory relationship protection scheme separate from marriage for all cohabiting couples, including same-sex couples. It was the first statutory protection for same-sex couples in Sweden. Unlike common-law marriage, this relationship status is recognized at the moment when two people enter a "marriage-like" relationship, which makes the couple eligible for some rights and benefits. Specifically, the protections apply when two persons begin to reside together in a joint home and live together as a couple in a presumptively permanent, sexual and cohabiting relationship. The law ensures that couples can agree on how their jointly acquired property will be divided in the event of a separation. In the absence of such an agreement, an equal division is presumed unless evidence of different ownership shares is provided. Each member of the couple is referred to in a gender-neutral manner as a sambo, a term used as shorthand for "persons who live together" (bor tillsammans). From 1988 to 2003, there were two different laws governing the rights of cohabiting couples—one for heterosexual couples and another for same-sex couples. These separate laws were unified into a single statute in July 2003 known as the Cohabitees Act (Sambolag).

This legal status offers limited rights, primarily focused on economic protection related to joint ownership of the common home and household goods. However, certain benefits and obligations have gradually been extended to sambo relationships. For example, subsidized assisted reproduction is available to such couples and requires the partner's consent. Nonetheless, before the recognition of same-sex marriage and registered partnerships, the limitations of this legal framework were especially pronounced for same-sex couples, who lacked access to more comprehensive legal protections. Notably, a surviving sambo partner is not entitled to inherit the deceased partner's property by default; instead, they must request a division of the common home and household goods from the deceased's heirs. As a result, the surviving sambo receives only half the statutory sum granted to widows and widowers when the deceased partner has willed their estate to someone else. The rest of the estate passes to the deceased's children, parents or other blood relatives, unless the sambo partner is explicitly included in a will. Unlike married couples—who enjoy presumptive rights to all jointly acquired property and income—same-sex sambor are only protected with respect to the shared home and household goods that were intentionally acquired for joint use. This limitation continues to apply regardless of the partners' gender. Over time, however, the legal status of cohabiting couples has evolved. For instance, while sambor were once barred from adopting their partner's children, they may now do so under the Children and Parents Code (Föräldrabalken). Additionally, cohabitation status is open to non-Swedes, meaning that one does not need to be married to move to Sweden to live with a partner.

== Registered partnerships ==
Registered partnerships (Swedish: registrerat partnerskap, pronounced [rɛ.jɪsˈtreːrat ˈpɑ̂ːʈnɛʂkɑːp]) were legalised in Sweden in 1995. A law to this effect was approved by the Swedish Parliament in June 1994 by a vote of 171–141, promulgated on 23 June, (Note: Since 1975, bills no longer require royal assent (kunglig sanktion) for promulgation. Instead, the government officially promulgates laws. As a result, King Carl XVI Gustaf did not need to grant his assent to this bill.) and took effect on 1 January 1995. Sweden was the third country in the world to legally recognise same-sex unions, after Denmark and Norway.

Registered partnerships, which were only available to same-sex couples, provided the same range of protections, responsibilities, and benefits as marriage—including adoption rights and legal procedures for relationship dissolution. Same-sex registered partners were granted the right to adopt jointly in 2003, and in vitro fertilisation for lesbian couples became permitted in 2005. From 2000, non-Swedes who were legally residing in Sweden were also eligible to enter into registered partnerships. The main distinction between registered partnerships and marriage was that they were governed by separate laws. Additionally, registered partnerships were strictly civil arrangements and could not be officiated by religious authorities. LGBT advocacy groups pushed for a gender-neutral marriage law that would define marriage as a civil institution conducted solely by the state—similar to the practice in several other countries—as this "would promote the separation of church and state", unlike the existing system in which churches hold the legal authority to conduct marriages.

== Same-sex marriage ==
=== Background ===
In 2004, Parliament established a committee to investigate the possibility of opening marriage to same-sex partners. The report, issued in March 2007, supported enacting a gender-neutral marriage law and abolishing the registered partnership law (registered partnerships would be automatically converted into marriages), while granting an "opt-out" to religious institutions, which would allow them to refuse to marry same-sex couples. This last point was quite controversial and increased calls for a gender-neutral marriage law. The committee further suggested that the Swedish Government bring the changes into effect by 1 January 2008.

Six of the seven political parties in the Riksdag were in favour of such a reform. These were the Left Party, the Greens, the Social Democrats, the Liberal People's Party, the Moderate Party and the Centre Party. The Christian Democrats opposed the idea, while the liberal conservative Moderates signed on their support at their party congress in 2007. The majority of Swedes approved of same-sex marriage, but there was strong opposition from religious organisations and other self-described "family-oriented" groups. Many complained about the slowly advancing governmental process of changing partnership into marriage, especially as the two types of unions were already essentially the same and many considered the change "inevitable and natural". Supporters said there was no validity in the argument that same-sex marriage would threaten opposite-sex marriage because a gender-neutral marriage law would have no greater impact on society than the partnership law and argued it was simply a matter of principle and equality. For the opposition, they saw it as a threat to the symbolic value of marriage.

=== Court case ===
On 12 May 2008, media sources reported that a married same-sex couple from Canada were challenging the Swedish Government in court because it refused to recognise their relationship as a marriage. Although a lower court, including the Court of Appeals, refused to hear the case, Sweden's highest administrative court, the Supreme Administrative Court, agreed to hear the case. The couple argued that a same-sex marriage entered into in accordance with Canadian law should be recognised in Sweden, despite the fact that there was no legal basis for it under then Swedish law. On 18 December 2008, the court ruled that the Swedish Tax Authority did not break any rules as the definition of marriage under Swedish law was at the time the union of one man and one woman, and that same-sex relationships were to be recognised as a registered partnership.

=== Vote in the Riksdag ===
The Reinfeldt Cabinet consisted of the Moderate Party, the Centre Party, the Liberal People's Party and the Christian Democratic Party. Justice Minister Beatrice Ask reacted positively when the committee presented its report in March 2007. How the legalisation would end was not clear as one of the coalition partners—the Christian Democrats—was against it. The leader of the Social Democratic Party, Mona Sahlin, said that the party would put forward its own bill in the Parliament if the cabinet failed to reach a consensus on the issue. In early October 2007, the Green Party, the Left Party and the Social Democratic Party said they would join forces to introduce an opposition motion in Parliament to legalize same-sex marriage. On 27 October 2007, the Moderate Party formally backed same-sex marriages, meaning that the Christian Democrats would be the only party to oppose the law. Göran Hägglund, the leader of the Christian Democrats, said on Sveriges Radio, "my position is that I have been tasked by the party to argue that marriage is for men and women. ... When we discuss it between parties we are naturally open and sensitive to each other's arguments and we'll see if we can find a line that allows us to come together." On 14 January 2008, two leading politicians from the Christian Democrats took a position against the party and expressed support for same-sex marriage.

On 12 December 2007, the Church of Sweden voted to support the introduction of civil marriage for same-sex couples, but recommended that the term "marriage" be restricted to opposite-sex couples in the Church. It was asked by the cabinet for its opinion on the matter before the introduction of legislation in early 2008. "Marriage and (same-sex) partnerships are equivalent forms of unions. Therefore the Church of Sweden's central board says yes to the proposal to join the legislation for marriages and partnerships into a single law," the Church said in a statement. "According to the Church of Sweden's board the word 'marriage' should, however, only be used for the relationship between a woman and a man", it said.

External videos
- Vote in the Riksdag on same-sex marriage, Riksdag, 1 April 2009

Reports suggested the cabinet would table its same-sex marriage bill in early 2008; however, it had yet to propose a bill. This was likely due to the Christian Democrats' opposition from within the four-party centre-right governing coalition despite being the only party opposing the move. After negotiations on a compromise broke down and facing a parliamentary ultimatum in late October 2008, the cabinet prepared to present its bill to a free vote. On 21 January 2009, legislation to amend the Marriage Code (Swedish: Äktenskapsbalken) (Note: In Sweden's official and non-official minority languages: Finnish: Avioliittokaari, pronounced [ˈɑʋioliːtːoˌkɑːri]; Meänkieli: Avioliittokaari, pronounced [ˈɑʋioliːtːoˌkɑːri]; Northern Sami: Náittosláhka, pronounced [ˈnaːjhttosˌlaːhka]; Lule Sami: Gállasjvuohtabálka; Southern Sami: Ektievoetebalke; Pite Sami: Jugalvasláhka; Romani: Solaxarimasko; Yiddish: חתונה געזעץ, Khasene Gezets; Elfdalian: Ektnskapslag; Gutnish: Äktnskapslag) to define marriage as the union of "two spouses" was introduced to the Swedish Parliament. (Note: Article 1 of the Marriage Code states: De två som ingår äktenskap med varandra blir makar., translating to "The two who marry each other become spouses.") The bill was passed on 1 April by a vote of 261–22 with 16 abstentions. It was promulgated and published on 16 April, and took effect on 1 May. The bill was supported by all parties except the Christian Democrats and one member of the Centre Party.

1 April 2009 vote in the Riksdag
| Party | Voted for | Voted against | Abstained | Absent (Did not vote) |
|---|---|---|---|---|
| Swedish Social Democratic Party | 111: Christer Adelsbo; Ann-Christin Ahlberg; Urban Ahlin; Phia Andersson; Berit Andnor; Ann Arleklo; Karin Åström; Luciano Astudillo; Christina Axelsson; Lennart Axelsson; Roland Bäckman; Ibrahim Baylan; Inger Jarl Beck; Mats Berglind; Bo Bernhardsson; Patrik Björck; Jan Björkman; Laila Bjurling; Thomas Bodström; Catharina Bråkenhielm; Claes-Göran Brandin; Gunilla Carlsson; Mikael Damberg; Carina Adolfsson Elgestam; Tomas Eneroth; Christer Engelhardt; Kerstin Engle; Alf Eriksson; Birgitta Eriksson; Matilda Ernkrans; Kenneth G. Forslund; Lars U. Granberg; Marie Granlund; Monica Green; Michael Hagberg; Christin Hagberg; Carina Hägg; Kerstin Haglö; Jörgen Hellman; Caroline Helmersson-Olsson; Hans Hoff; Berit Högman; Peter Hultqvist; Margareta Israelsson; Eva-Lena Jansson; Peter Jeppsson; Renée Jeryd; Ylva Johansson; Jan Emanuel Johansson; Morgan Johansson; Lars Johansson; Peter Jonsson; Sonia Karlsson; Anders Karlsson; Yilmaz Kerimo; Kurt Kvarnström; Jan-Olof Larsson; Lars Mejern Larsson; Lars Lilja; Désirée Liljevall; Åsa Lindestam; Sylvia Lindgren; Johan Löfstrand; Agneta Lundberg; Fredrik Lundh; Louise Malmström; Elisebeht Markström; Carina Moberg; Jennie Nilsson; Pia Nilsson; Marie Nordén; Carina Ohlsson; Ronny Olander; Hans Olsson; Jasenko Omanovic; Krister Örnfjäder; Christina Oskarsson; Sven-Erik Österberg; Leif Pagrotsky; Nikos Papadopoulos; Raimo Pärssinen; Margareta Persson; Helene Petersson; Marina Pettersson; Helén Pettersson; Leif Pettersson; Britta Rådström; Bosse Ringholm; Carin Runeson; Ameer Sachet; Gunnar Sandberg; Anneli Särnblad; Eva Sonidsson; Hans Stenberg; Maria Stenberg; Thomas Strand; Magdalena Streijffert; Per Svedberg; Tommy Ternemar; Olle Thorell; Tone Tingsgård; Marita Ulvskog; Börje Vestlund; Björn von Sydow; Göte Wahlström; Tommy Waidelich; Lars Wegendal; Maryam Yazdanfar; Anders Ygeman; Kristina Zakrisson; Christina Zedell | – | – | 19: Karl Gustav Abramsson; Sinikka Bohlin; Susanne Eberstein; Aleksander Gabelic; Agneta Gille; Billy Gustafsson; Lena Hallengren; Kent Härstedt; Leif Jakobsson; Ann-Kristine Johansson; Håkan Juholt; Hillevi Larsson; Anne Ludvigsson; Fredrik Olovsson; Thomas Östros; Veronica Palm; Göran Persson; Mona Sahlin; Siw Wittgren-Ahl |
| G Moderate Party | 67: Magdalena Andersson; Staffan Anger; Staffan Appelros; Sofia Arkelsten; Lena Asplund; Anti Avsan; Gunnar Axén; Anna Kinberg Batra; Finn Bengtsson; Ulf Berg; Lisbeth Grönfeldt Bergman; Per Bill; Gustav Blix; Helena Bouveng; Katarina Brännström; Anne Marie Brodén; Willemo Carlsson; Mikael Cederbratt; Margareta Cederfelt; Annicka Engblom; Hillevi Engström; Karin Enström; Mahmood Fahmi; Ewa Thalén Finné; Patrik Forslund; Inge Garstedt; Mats Gerdau; Ulf Grape; Rolf Gunnarsson; Lars Hjälmered; Christian Holm; Anna König Jerlmyr; Isabella Jernbeck; Mats Johansson; Ann-Charlotte Hammar Johnsson; Christine Jönsson; Ulrika Karlsson; Marianne Kierkemann; Bertil Kjellberg; Margareta B. Kjellin; Marie Weibull Kornias; Olof Lavesson; Björn Leivik; Göran Lennmarker; Anna Lilliehöök; Lars Lindblad; Malin Löfsjögård; Göran Montan; Nils Oskar Nilsson; Mats G. Nilsson; Andreas Norlén; Eliza Roszkowska Öberg; Oskar Öholm; Margareta Pålsson; Anne-Marie Pålsson; Sven Yngve Persson; Jessica Polfjärd; Jan-Evert Rådhström; Helena Rivière; Hans Rothenberg; Karl Sigfrid; Eva Bengtson Skogsberg; Cecilie Tenfjord-Toftby; Göran Thingwall; Tomas Tobé; Henrik von Sydow; Cecilia Widegren | – | 15: Marietta de Pourbaix-Lundin; Walburga Habsburg Douglas; Lars Elinderson; Jan Ericson; Krister Hammarbergh; Bengt-Anders Johansson; Jeppe Johnsson; Rolf K. Nilsson; Göran Pettersson; Fredrik Schulte; Lars-Arne Staxäng; Elisabeth Svantesson; Peder Wachtmeister; Hans Wallmark; Marianne Watz | 15: Boriana Åberg; Jan R. Andersson; Sten Bergheden; Reza Khelili Dylami; Björn Hamilton; Lennart Hedquist; Göran Lindblad; Cecilia Magnusson; Betty Malmberg; Kent Olsson; Maria Plass; Inger René; Mats Sander; Ola Sundell; Rune Wikström |
| G Centre Party | 25: Anders Åkesson; Jan Andersson; Per Åsling; Sven Bergström; Ulrika Carlsson; Fredrick Federley; Maria Kornevik Jakobsson; Kenneth Johansson; Jörgen Johansson; Annie Johansson; Sofia Larsen; Lennart Levi; Johan Linander; Eva Selin Lindgren; Per Lodenius; Karin Nilsson; Lennart Pettersson; Annika Qarlsson; Åke Sandström; Birgitta Sellén; Solveig Ternström; Roger Tiefensee; Stefan Tornberg; Claes Västerteg; Gunnel Wallin | 1: Staffan Danielsson | – | 3: Erik A. Eriksson; Kerstin Lundgren; Solveig Zander |
| G Liberal People's Party | 23: Tina Acketoft; Gunnar Andrén; Gulan Avci; Hans Backman; Helena Bargholtz; Agneta Berliner; Anita Brodén; Karin Granbom Ellison; Jan Ertsborn; Eva Flyborg; Liselott Hagberg; Solveig Hellquist; Tobias Krantz; Nina Larsson; Maria Lundqvist-Brömster; Ulf Nilsson; Christer Nylander; Johan Pehrson; Karin Pilsäter; Lars Tysklind; Barbro Westerholm; Cecilia Wigström; Cecilia Wikström | – | – | 5: Carl B. Hamilton; Camilla Lindberg; Birgitta Ohlsson; Allan Widman; Christer Winbäck |
| G Christian Democrats | – | 21: Yvonne Andersson; Stefan Attefall; Inger Davidson; Kjell Eldensjö; Annelie Enochson; Holger Gustafsson; Lars Gustafsson; Emma Henriksson; Eva Johnsson; Dan Kihlström; Else-Marie Lindgren; Lars-Axel Nordell; Liza-Maria Norlin; Mikael Oscarsson; Irene Oskarsson; Lennart Sacrédeus; Alf Svensson; Ingvar Svensson; Gunilla Tjernberg; Ingemar Vänerlöv; Otto von Arnold | 1: Rosita Runegrund | 2: Chatrine Pålsson Ahlgren; Désirée Pethrus Engström |
| Left Party | 19: Ulla Andersson; Alice Åström; Marianne Berg; Josefin Brink; Rossana Dinamarca; Marie Engström; Egon Frid; Siv Holma; Wiwi-Anne Johansson; Jacob Johnson; Amineh Kakabaveh; Kalle Larsson; Hans Linde; Elina Linna; Lars Ohly; Eva Olofsson; LiseLotte Olsson; Peter Pedersen; Kent Persson | – | – | 3: Torbjörn Björlund; Lena Olsson; Gunilla Wahlén |
| Green Party | 16: Max Andersson; Per Bolund; Esabelle Dingizian; Tina Ehn; Gunvor G. Ericson; Peter Eriksson; Ulf Holm; Mikael Johansson; Helena Leander; Jan Lindholm; Thomas Nihlén; Mats Pertoft; Lage Rahm; Karin Svensson Smith; Mikaela Valtersson; Maria Wetterstrand | – | – | 3: Bodil Ceballos; Mehmet Kaplan; Peter Rådberg |
| Total | 261 | 22 | 16 | 50 |
| Total | 74.8% | 6.3% | 4.6% | 14.3% |

The first same-sex couple to marry in Sweden were Alf Karlsson and Johan Lundqvist at Stockholm City Hall on 1 May 2009. The marriage ceremony was officiated by Green Party politician Maria Wetterstrand.

In 2019, all the major parties represented in the Riksdag were in favour of same-sex marriage. However, the Sweden Democrats and the Christian Democrats are in favour of state-recognized same-sex marriage, while believing that religious organisations or individuals working for them (such as priests of the Church of Sweden) should be able to refuse to perform them.

=== Royal same-sex weddings ===
In October 2021, Marshal Fredrik Wersäll confirmed that members of the Swedish royal family may enter into same-sex marriages without having to forfeit the crown, or lose their royal titles and privileges or their place in the line of succession. A Swedish prince or princess must have the government's consent to marry, but a same-sex marriage would not be treated any differently to an opposite-sex marriage. This followed a similar announcement concerning the Dutch royal family.

=== Impact ===
A study by the Danish Research Institute for Suicide Prevention, released in 2019, showed that the legalisation of same-sex marriage, as well as other supportive policies and legislation, had decreased the suicide rate among same-sex partners. The study, conducted in both Sweden and Denmark, found a 46% fall in suicides of people in same-sex unions between the periods 1989–2002 and 2003–2016, compared to 28% among heterosexual couples.

=== Statistics ===
In July 2013, Statistics Sweden (SCB) released estimates on the number of individuals who had entered into same-sex marriages since the legalisation of same-sex marriage in 2009. The data showed that, in every county except Stockholm, there had been more marriages between women than between men. A total of 4,521 women were married to another woman, compared to 3,646 men in same-sex marriages. The odd figure for female marriages is due to SCB not including foreigners in the statistics. Most same-sex marriages occurred in Stockholm, Västra Götaland, Skåne and Uppsala counties.

As of the end of 2017, SCB reported that 12,158 people were in same-sex marriages, with 56% being women and 44% being men. The average age at marriage for women in same-sex relationships was 34 years, and 41 years for men—compared to 34 and 36 years, respectively, for opposite-sex partners. Stockholm, Västra Götaland and Skåne counties recorded the highest numbers of same-sex marriages, while Gotland, Jämtland and Blekinge registered the fewest.

=== Religious performance ===
In 2009, Eva Brunne was elected and consecrated as the Lutheran Bishop of Stockholm. She was the first lesbian bishop in the world and the first bishop of the Church of Sweden to be in a registered same-sex partnership. On 22 October 2009, the Assembly of the Church of Sweden voted strongly in favour of giving its blessing to same-sex marriages, including the use of the term "marriage". It was the first major church in Sweden to take this position on same-sex marriage. The Archbishop of Uppsala, Anders Wejryd, commented that he was pleased with the decision. The second and third largest Christian denominations in the country, the Catholic Church and the Swedish Pentecostal Movement, commented that they were "disappointed" with the decision of the Church of Sweden. Priests are under no obligation to solemnize same-sex marriages if this would violate their personal beliefs. Prime Minister Stefan Löfven said in June 2017 that he did not believe a priest working for the Church of Sweden should be allowed to refuse to marry same-sex couples. In 2023, bishops Sören Dalevi, Mikael Mogren and Andreas Holmberg told Expressen that "our common goal regarding weddings is that all priests happily and of their own free marry couples of different sexes and couples of the same sex. This target image is a guide in our work with the admission of priest candidates and in our work with promotion and supervision in our respective dioceses."

Some smaller Christian denominations also allow their congregations to solemnize same-sex marriages, including the Uniting Church in Sweden, the Old Catholic Church in Sweden and Denmark, Quakers, and the Liberal Catholic Church. The first religious same-sex wedding in Sweden was performed in a Liberal Catholic church in Stora Essingen in July 2009 between Maj-Briht and Helle Bergström-Walan. Some Jewish groups also perform same-sex marriages. Additionally, the Nordic Asa-Community and the Community of Forn Sed Sweden both solemnize and support same-sex marriages. In 2008, the Muslim Association of Sweden stated that no imams would marry same-sex couples. In 2014, French-Algerian Imam Ludovic-Mohamed Zahed officiated at the religious marriage of two Iranian women in Stockholm, which proved controversial in Muslim circles.

== Public opinion ==
A Eurobarometer poll conducted in autumn 2006 found that 71% of Swedes supported legalising same-sex marriage, with support highest at 87% in Stockholm County and lowest at 58% in Jönköping County. This public approval was the second highest in the European Union at the time, behind the Netherlands. A YouGov poll conducted between 27 December 2012 and 6 January 2013 found that 79% of Swedes supported same-sex marriage, 14% were opposed and 7% had no opinion. A May 2013 Ipsos poll found that 81% of respondents were in favour of same-sex marriage and another 9% supported other forms of recognition for same-sex couples.

The 2015 Eurobarometer found that 90% of Swedes thought same-sex marriage should be allowed throughout Europe, while 7% were opposed. A Pew Research Center poll, conducted between April and August 2017 and published in May 2018, showed that 88% of Swedes supported same-sex marriage, 7% were opposed and 5% did not know or had refused to answer. When divided by religion, 94% of religiously unaffiliated people, 90% of non-practicing Christians and 65% of church-attending Christians supported same-sex marriage. Opposition was 5% among 18–34-year-olds.

The 2019 Eurobarometer found that 92% of Swedes thought same-sex marriage should be allowed throughout Europe, while 6% were opposed. A Pew Research Center poll conducted between February and May 2023 also showed that 92% of Swedes supported same-sex marriage, 6% were opposed and 2% did not know or had refused to answer. When divided by age, support was highest among 18–34-year-olds at 96% and lowest among those aged 35 and above at 90%. Women (96%) were also more likely to support same-sex marriage than men (87%). When divided by political affiliation, support was highest among those on the left of the political spectrum at 98%, followed by those at the center at 93% and those on the right at 90%. Support had increased to 94% according to the 2023 Eurobarometer, while 5% were opposed. The survey also found that 95% of Swedes thought that "there is nothing wrong in a sexual relationship between two persons of the same sex", while 4% disagreed.

== See also ==
- LGBT rights in Sweden
- Recognition of same-sex unions in Europe
