= List of members of the Riksdag, 2006–2010 =

This is a list of members of the Riksdag, the national parliament of Sweden. The Riksdag is a unicameral assembly with 349 members of parliament (Swedish: riksdagsledamöter), who are elected on a proportional basis to serve fixed terms of four years. In the Riksdag, members are seated per constituency and not party. The following MPs were elected in the 2006 Swedish general election and will serve until the 2010 Swedish general election. Members of the center-right Cabinet of Fredrik Reinfeldt, the ruling coalition during this term, are marked in bold, party leaders of the seven parties represented in the Riksdag in italic.

== Composition ==
Party colors	Seats	Party leader
Social Democratic Party	130	Göran Persson (1996–2007); Mona Sahlin (2007–2011)
Moderate Party	97	Fredrik Reinfeldt (2003–present)
Centre Party	29	Maud Olofsson (2001–2011)
Liberal People's Party	28	Lars Leijonborg (1997–2007); Jan Björklund (2007–present)
Christian Democrats	24	Göran Hägglund (2004–present)
Left Party	22	Lars Ohly (2004–present)
Green Party	19	Peter Eriksson (2002–2011); Maria Wetterstrand (2002–2011)

== List of elected MPs ==
Seat	Name	Party	Constituency
1	Jan Björkman (1st Vice Speaker)	Social Democrats	Blekinge County
2	Birgitta Sellén (2nd Vice Speaker)	Centre Party	Västernorrland County
3	Liselott Hagberg (3rd Vice Speaker)	Liberal People's Party	Södermanland County
4	**Lars Leijonborg** (substituted (6 October 2006–) by Mauricio Rojas)	Liberal People's Party	Stockholm County
5	Mona Sahlin	Social Democrats	Stockholm County
6	Per Westerberg (Speaker) (substituted (6 October 2006–) by Peder Wachtmeister)	Moderate Party	Södermanland County
7	Göran Persson (replaced (1 May 2007) by Caroline Helmersson Olsson)	Social Democrats	Södermanland County
8	Michael Hagberg	Social Democrats	Södermanland County
9	Sonia Karlsson	Social Democrats	Östergötland County
10	Peter Eriksson	Green Party	Östergötland County
11	Yvonne Andersson	Christian Democrats	Östergötland County
12	Jeppe Johnsson	Moderate Party	Blekinge County
13	Kerstin Andersson	Social Democrats	Blekinge County
14	Annicka Engblom	Moderate Party	Blekinge County
15	Alf Svensson	Christian Democrats	Skåne County North & East
16	Ylva Johansson	Social Democrats	Skåne County North & East
17	Christer Nylander	Liberal People's Party	Skåne County North & East
18	Inger René	Moderate Party	Västra Götaland County West
19	Kent Olsson	Moderate Party	Västra Götaland County West
20	Rosita Runegrund	Christian Democrats	Västra Götaland County West
21	Ann-Kristine Johansson	Social Democrats	Värmland County
22	Marie Engström	Left Party	Värmland County
23	Rolf Gunnarsson	Moderate Party	Dalarna County
24	**Mats Odell** (substituted (6 October 2006–) by Emma Henriksson)	Christian Democrats	Stockholm County
23	Göran Lennmarker	Moderate Party	Stockholm County
26	Inger Davidson	Christian Democrats	Stockholm County
27	Karin Pilsäter	Liberal People's Party	Stockholm County
28	Laila Bjurling	Social Democrats	Södermanland County
29	Elisebeht Markström	Social Democrats	Södermanland County
30	Gunnar Axén	Moderate Party	Östergötland County
31	Anne Ludvigsson	Social Democrats	Östergötland County
32	Billy Gustafsson	Social Democrats	Östergötland County
33	**Gunilla Carlsson** (substituted (6 October 2006–) by Finn Bengtsson)	Moderate Party	Östergötland County
34	Christer Engelhardt	Social Democrats	Gotland County
35	Rolf K. Nilsson	Moderate Party	Gotland County
36	Peter Jeppsson	Social Democrats	Blekinge County
37	Marie Granlund	Social Democrats	Malmö Municipality
38	Kerstin Engle	Social Democrats	Skåne County North & East
39	Lars-Ivar Ericsson	Centre Party	Skåne County North & East
40	Margareta Pålsson	Moderate Party	Skåne County North & East
41	**Åsa Torstensson** (substituted (6 October 2006–) by Maria Kornevik-Jakobsson)	Centre Party	Västra Götaland County West
42	Jan-Olof Larsson	Social Democrats	Västra Götaland County West
43	Holger Gustafsson	Christian Democrats	Västra Götaland County East
44	Marina Pettersson	Social Democrats	Värmland County
45	Dan Kihlström	Christian Democrats	Värmland County
46	Jan-Evert Rådhström	Moderate Party	Värmland County
47	Kenneth Johansson	Centre Party	Dalarna County
48	Marita Ulvskog	Social Democrats	Dalarna County
49	Kurt Kvarnström	Social Democrats	Dalarna County
50	Sylvia Lindgren	Social Democrats	Dalarna County
51	**Mikael Odenberg** (substituted (6 October 2006–15 November 2006) by Reza Khelili Dylami) (substituted (16 November 2006–17 September 2007) by Marianne Watz) (replaced (18 September 2007–) by Sofia Arkelsten)	Moderate Party	Stockholm Municipality
52	Pär Nuder	Social Democrats	Stockholm County
53	Carina Moberg	Social Democrats	Stockholm County
54	Björn von Sydow	Social Democrats	Stockholm County
55	Christina Axelsson	Social Democrats	Stockholm County
56	Kjell Eldensjö	Christian Democrats	Södermanland County
57	Elina Linna	Left Party	Södermanland County
58	Louise Malmström	Social Democrats	Östergötland County
59	Johan Löfstrand	Social Democrats	Östergötland County
60	Chatrine Pålsson Ahlgren	Christian Democrats	Kalmar County
61	Krister Örnfjäder	Social Democrats	Kalmar County
62	Leif Jakobsson	Social Democrats	Malmö Municipality
63	Karin Svensson Smith	Green Party	Malmö Municipality
64	Göran Persson	Social Democrats	Skåne County North & East
65	Christer Adelsbo	Social Democrats	Skåne County North & East
66	Alf Eriksson	Social Democrats	Halland County
67	Hans Hoff	Social Democrats	Halland County
68	Lars Tysklind	Liberal People's Party	Västra Götaland County West
69	Catharina Bråkenhielm	Social Democrats	Västra Götaland County West
70	Monica Green	Social Democrats	Västra Götaland County East
71	Urban Ahlin	Social Democrats	Västra Götaland County East
72	Tommy Ternemar	Social Democrats	Värmland County
73	Berit Högman	Social Democrats	Värmland County
74	Anneli Särnblad	Social Democrats	Dalarna County
75	Lena Olsson	Left Party	Dalarna County
76	Sinikka Bohlin	Social Democrats	Gävleborg County
77	Ulrica Messing (replaced (18 September 2007–) by Roland Bäckman)	Social Democrats	Gävleborg County
78	Lars Lilja	Social Democrats	Västerbotten County
79	Ulla Löfgren (replaced (1 October 2008–) by Ulf Grape)	Moderate Party	Västerbotten County
80	**Göran Hägglund** (substituted (6 October 2006–) by Désirée Pethrus Engström)	Christian Democrats	Stockholm Municipality
81	**Fredrik Reinfeldt** (substituted (6 October 2006–15 November 2006) by Helena Rivière) (substituted (16 November 2006–17 September 2007) by Sofia Arkelsten) (substituted (7 May 2008–) by Margareta Cederfelt)	Moderate Party	Stockholm Municipality
82	Ingvar Svensson	Christian Democrats	Stockholm County
83	Marietta de Pourbaix-Lundin	Moderate Party	Stockholm County
84	Barbro Westerholm	Liberal People's Party	Stockholm County
85	Catharina Elmsäter-Svärd (replaced (1 March 2008–) by Eliza Roszkowska Öberg)	Moderate Party	Stockholm County
86	Roger Tiefensee	Centre Party	Södermanland County
87	Fredrik Olovsson	Social Democrats	Södermanland County
88	Karin Granbom	Liberal People's Party	Östergötland County
89	Staffan Danielsson	Centre Party	Östergötland County
90	Håkan Juholt	Social Democrats	Kalmar County
91	Eva Bengtson Skogsberg	Moderate Party	Kalmar County
92	Hillevi Larsson (substituted (9 June 2008–1 January 2009) by Rose-Marie Carlsson)	Social Democrats	Malmö Municipality
93	Allan Widman	Liberal People's Party	Malmö Municipality
94	Göran Montan	Moderate Party	Skåne County North & East
95	Hans Wallmark	Moderate Party	Skåne County North & East
96	Lars Gustafsson	Christian Democrats	Halland County
97	Jan Ertsborn	Liberal People's Party	Halland County
98	Kenneth G. Forslund	Social Democrats	Västra Götaland County West
99	Birgitta Eriksson	Social Democrats	Västra Götaland County West
100	Carina Ohlsson	Social Democrats	Västra Götaland County East
101	Lars Elinderson	Moderate Party	Västra Götaland County East
102	Lars Mejern Larsson	Social Democrats	Värmland County
103	Erik A. Eriksson	Centre Party	Värmland County
104	Jan Lindholm	Green Party	Dalarna County
105	Carin Runesson	Social Democrats	Dalarna County
106	Sven Bergström	Centre Party	Gävleborg County
107	Raimo Pärssinen	Social Democrats	Gävleborg County
108	Karl Gustav Abramsson	Social Democrats	Västerbotten County
109	Gunilla Tjernberg	Christian Democrats	Västerbotten County
110	**Beatrice Ask** (substituted (6 October 2006–15 November 2006) by Sofia Arkelsten) (substituted (16 November 2006–17 September 2007) by Reza Khelili Dylami) (substituted (7 May 2008–) by Marianne Watz)	Moderate Party	Stockholm Municipality
111	Anders Ygeman (substituted (18 March 2007–17 September 2007) by Maria Östberg Svanelind)	Social Democrats	Stockholm Municipality
112	Tommy Waidelich	Social Democrats	Stockholm County
113	Lars Ohly	Left Party	Stockholm County
114	Yilmaz Kerimo	Social Democrats	Stockholm County
115	Karin Enström	Moderate Party	Stockholm County
116	Gunvor G. Ericson	Green Party	Södermanland County
117	Walburga Habsburg Douglas	Moderate Party	Södermanland County
118	Torbjörn Björlund	Left Party	Östergötland County
119	Betty Malmberg	Moderate Party	Östergötland County
120	Anders Åkesson	Centre Party	Kalmar County
121	Désirée Liljevall	Social Democrats	Kalmar County
122	**Tobias Billström** (substituted (6 October 2006–15 February 2007) by Osama Ali Maher) (substituted (16 February 2007–) by Staffan Appelros)	Moderate Party	Malmö Municipality
123	Luciano Astudillo	Social Democrats	Malmö Municipality
124	Ronny Olander	Social Democrats	Skåne County South
125	Catherine Persson (replaced (9 April 2007–) by Bo Bernhardsson)	Social Democrats	Skåne County South
126	Anne Marie Brodén	Moderate Party	Halland County
127	Jan Andersson	Centre Party	Halland County
128	Wiwi-Anne Johansson	Left Party	Västra Götaland County West
129	Maria Plass	Moderate Party	Västra Götaland County West
130	Christer Winbäck	Liberal People's Party	Västra Götaland County East
131	Cecilia Widegren	Moderate Party	Västra Götaland County East
132	Christian Holm	Moderate Party	Värmland County
133	Nina Larsson	Liberal People's Party	Värmland County
134	Mikael Rosén (replaced (16 November 2006–) by Patrik Forslund)	Moderate Party	Dalarna County
135	Ulf Berg	Moderate Party	Dalarna County
136	Åsa Lindestam	Social Democrats	Gävleborg County
137	Hans Backman	Liberal People's Party	Gävleborg County
138	**Maud Olofsson** (substituted (6 October 2006–) by Åke Sandström}	Centre Party	Västerbotten County
139	Britta Rådström	Social Democrats	Västerbotten County
140	Nikos Papadopoulos	Social Democrats	Stockholm Municipality
141	Anna Lilliehöök	Moderate Party	Stockholm Municipality
142	Gunnar Andrén	Liberal People's Party	Stockholm County
143	Kerstin Lundgren	Centre Party	Stockholm County
144	**Ewa Björling** (substituted (18 September 2007–29 February 2008) by Eliza Roszkowska Öberg) (substituted (1 March 2008–) by Göran Thingwall)	Moderate Party	Stockholm County
145	Hillevi Engström	Moderate Party	Stockholm County
146	Lennart Hedquist	Moderate Party	Uppsala County
147	Per Bill	Moderate Party	Uppsala County
148	Aleksander Gabelic	Social Democrats	Östergötland County
149	Andreas Norlén	Moderate Party	Östergötland County
150	Jan R. Andersson	Moderate Party	Kalmar County
151	Lena Hallengren (substituted (3 March 2008–1 March 2009) by Dan Nilsson)	Social Democrats	Kalmar County
152	Inge Garstedt	Moderate Party	Malmö Municipality
153	Marianne Berg	Left Party	Malmö Municipality
154	Ulf Nilsson	Liberal People's Party	Skåne County South
155	Morgan Johansson	Social Democrats	Skåne County South
156	Henrik von Sydow	Moderate Party	Halland County
157	Marianne Kierkemann	Moderate Party	Halland County
158	Lars-Arne Staxäng	Moderate Party	Västra Götaland County West
159	Tina Ehn	Green Party	Västra Götaland County West
160	Egon Frid	Left Party	Västra Götaland County East
161	Patrik Björck	Social Democrats	Västra Götaland County East
162	**Sten Tolgfors** (substituted (6 October 2006–) by Oskar Öholm)	Moderate Party	Örebro County
163	Peter Pedersen	Left Party	Örebro County
164	Lennart Sacrédeus	Christian Democrats	Dalarna County
165	Peter Hultqvist	Social Democrats	Dalarna County
166	Margareta Kjellin	Moderate Party	Gävleborg County
167	Bodil Ceballos	Green Party	Gävleborg County
168	Thomas Nihlén	Green Party	Västerbotten County
169	LiseLotte Olsson	Left Party	Västerbotten County
170	Kalle Larsson	Left Party	Stockholm Municipality
171	Carl B. Hamilton	Liberal People's Party	Stockholm Municipality
172	Maria Wetterstrand	Green Party	Stockholm Municipality
173	Bosse Ringholm	Social Democrats	Stockholm Municipality
174	Mikaela Valtersson	Green Party	Stockholm County
175	Mikael Damberg	Social Democrats	Stockholm County
176	Björn Hamilton	Moderate Party	Stockholm County
177	Christina Zedell	Social Democrats	Stockholm County
178	Thomas Östros	Social Democrats	Uppsala County
179	Tone Tingsgård	Social Democrats	Uppsala County
180	Margareta Persson	Social Democrats	Jönköping County
181	Alice Åström	Left Party	Jönköping County
182	**Eskil Erlandsson** (substituted (6 October 2006–) by Karin Nilsson)	Centre Party	Kronoberg County
183	Tomas Eneroth	Social Democrats	Kronoberg County
184	Olof Lavesson	Moderate Party	Malmö Municipality
185	**Cristina Husmark Pehrsson** (substituted (6 October 2006–) by Ann-Charlotte Hammar Johnsson)	Moderate Party	Skåne County West
186	Lars Lindblad	Moderate Party	Skåne County South
187	Ewa Thalén Finné	Moderate Party	Skåne County South
188	Jennie Nilsson	Social Democrats	Halland County
189	Magdalena Streijffert	Social Democrats	Halland County
190	Claes-Göran Brandin	Social Democrats	Göteborg Municipality
191	Eva Flyborg	Liberal People's Party	Göteborg Municipality
192	Britt Bohlin Olsson (replaced (1 June 2008–) by Renée Jeryd)	Social Democrats	Västra Götaland County North
193	Ingemar Vänerlöv	Christian Democrats	Västra Götaland County North
194	Charlotte Nordström (replaced (16 November 2006–) by Sten Bergheden)	Moderate Party	Västra Götaland County East
195	Ulrika Carlsson	Centre Party	Västra Götaland County East
196	Mikael Johansson	Green Party	Örebro County
197	Johan Pehrson	Liberal People's Party	Örebro County
198	Margareta Israelsson	Social Democrats	Västmanland County
199	Camilla Lindberg	Liberal People's Party	Dalarna County
200	Ulla Andersson	Left Party	Gävleborg County
201	Per Svedberg	Social Democrats	Gävleborg County
202	Maria Lundqvist-Brömster	Liberal People's Party	Västerbotten County
203	Ibrahim Baylan	Social Democrats	Västerbotten County
204	Helén Pettersson	Social Democrats	Västerbotten County
205	Kristina Zakrisson	Social Democrats	Norrbotten County
206	**Lena Adelsohn Liljeroth** (substituted (26 October 2006–17 September 2007) by Margareta Cederfelt) (substituted (7 May 2008–) by Mahmood Fahmi)	Moderate Party	Stockholm Municipality
207	Veronica Palm	Social Democrats	Stockholm Municipality
208	Birgitta Ohlsson	Liberal People's Party	Stockholm Municipality
209	Solveig Ternström	Centre Party	Stockholm Municipality
210	Anna Kinberg Batra	Moderate Party	Stockholm County
211	Maryam Yazdanfar	Social Democrats	Stockholm County
212	Nils Oskar Nilsson	Moderate Party	Stockholm County
213	Lennart Levi	Centre Party	Stockholm County
214	Mats Berglind	Social Democrats	Uppsala County
215	Mikael Oscarsson	Christian Democrats	Uppsala County
216	Carina Hägg	Social Democrats	Jönköping County
217	Stefan Attefall	Christian Democrats	Jönköping County
218	Lars Wegendal	Social Democrats	Kronoberg County
219	Carina Adolfsson Elgestam	Social Democrats	Kronoberg County
220	Anders Karlsson	Social Democrats	Skåne County West
221	Kent Härstedt	Social Democrats	Skåne County West
222	Peter Althin (replaced (5 November 2007–) by Otto von Arnold)	Christian Democrats	Skåne County South
223	Anne-Marie Pålsson	Moderate Party	Skåne County South
224	Siw Wittgren-Ahl	Social Democrats	Göteborg Municipality
225	Göran Lindblad	Moderate Party	Göteborg Municipality
226	Cecilia Magnusson	Moderate Party	Göteborg Municipality
227	Annelie Enochson	Christian Democrats	Göteborg Municipality
228	Christina Oskarsson	Social Democrats	Västra Götaland County North
229	Rossana Dinamarca	Left Party	Västra Götaland County North
230	Else-Marie Lindgren	Christian Democrats	Västra Götaland County South
231	Ulf Sjösten (replaced (30 September 2008–) by Cecilie Tenfjord-Toftby)	Moderate Party	Västra Götaland County South
232	Sofia Larsen	Centre Party	Örebro County
233	Lennart Axelsson	Social Democrats	Örebro County
234	Sven-Erik Österberg	Social Democrats	Västmanland County
235	Jörgen Johansson	Centre Party	Västmanland County
236	Tomas Tobé	Moderate Party	Gävleborg County
237	Hans Stenberg	Social Democrats	Västernorrland County
238	Berit Andnor	Social Democrats	Jämtland County
239	Ola Sundell	Moderate Party	Jämtland County
240	Lars U. Granberg	Social Democrats	Norrbotten County
241	Siv Holma	Left Party	Norrbotten County
242	Mats Johansson	Moderate Party	Stockholm Municipality
243	Sten Nordin (replaced (7 May 2008–) by Reza Khelili Dylami)	Moderate Party	Stockholm Municipality
244	**Jan Björklund** (substituted (6 October 2006–) by Fredrik Malm)	Liberal People's Party	Stockholm Municipality
245	Pernilla Zethraeus (replaced (17 June 2008–)by Amineh Kakabaveh)	Left Party	Stockholm Municipality
246	Rune Vikström	Moderate Party	Stockholm County
247	Mats Pertoft	Green Party	Stockholm County
248	Anti Avsan	Moderate Party	Stockholm County
249	Göran Pettersson	Moderate Party	Stockholm County
250	Agneta Gille	Social Democrats	Uppsala County
251	Cecilia Wikström	Liberal People's Party	Uppsala County
252	Göte Wahlström	Social Democrats	Jönköping County
253	**Maria Larsson** (substituted (6 October 2006–) by Irene Osakarsson)	Christian Democrats	Jönköping County
254	Katarina Brännström	Moderate Party	Kronoberg County
255	Eva Johnsson	Christian Democrats	Kronoberg County
256	Christin Hagberg	Social Democrats	Skåne County West
257	Torkild Strandberg (replaced (11 January 2007–) by Tina Acketoft)	Liberal People's Party	Skåne County West
258	Ulf Holm	Green Party	Skåne County South
259	Johan Linander	Centre Party	Skåne County South
260	Lars Johansson	Social Democrats	Göteborg Municipality
261	Leif Pagrotsky	Social Democrats	Göteborg Municipality
262	Gunilla Carlsson	Social Democrats	Göteborg Municipality
263	Cecilia Wigström	Liberal People's Party	Göteborg Municipality
264	Anita Brodén	Liberal People's Party	Västra Götaland County North
265	Peter Jonsson	Social Democrats	Västra Götaland County North
266	Claes Västerteg	Centre Party	Västra Götaland County South
267	Ann-Christin Ahlberg	Social Democrats	Västra Götaland County South
268	Sven Gunnar Persson	Christian Democrats	Örebro County
269	Thomas Bodström	Social Democrats	Örebro County
270	Pia Nilsson	Social Democrats	Västmanland County
271	Staffan Anger	Moderate Party	Västmanland County
272	Agneta Lundberg	Social Democrats	Västernorrland County
273	Susanne Eberstein	Social Democrats	Västernorrland County
274	Gunnar Sandberg	Social Democrats	Jämtland County
275	Marie Nordén	Social Democrats	Jämtland County
276	Maria Öberg	Social Democrats	Norrbotten County
277	Krister Hammarbergh	Moderate Party	Norrbotten County
278	Carin Jämtin (replaced (22 December 2006–) by Börje Vestlund)	Social Democrats	Stockholm Municipality
279	Mats G. Nilsson	Moderate Party	Stockholm Municipality
280	Mehmet Kaplan	Green Party	Stockholm Municipality
281	Per Bolund	Green Party	Stockholm Municipality
282	Mikael Sandström (substituted (1 March 2008–14 September 2009) by Malin Löfsjögård)	Moderate Party	Stockholm County
283	Isabella Jernbeck	Moderate Party	Stockholm County
284	Esabelle Reshdouni	Green Party	Stockholm County
285	Mats Gerdau	Moderate Party	Stockholm County
286	Ulrika Karlsson	Moderate Party	Uppsala County
287	Jacob Johnson	Left Party	Uppsala County
288	Bengt-Anders Johansson	Moderate Party	Jönköping County
289	Helene Petersson	Social Democrats	Jönköping County
290	Tobias Krantz	Liberal People's Party	Jönköping County
291	Anna Bergkvist	Moderate Party	Kronoberg County
292	Peter Danielsson (replaced (9 November 2006–) by Sven Yngve Persson)	Moderate Party	Skåne County West
293	Lennart Pettersson	Centre Party	Skåne County West
294	Inger Jarl Beck	Social Democrats	Skåne County South
295	Christine Jönsson	Moderate Party	Skåne County South
296	Eva Selin Lindgren	Centre Party	Göteborg Municipality
297	Lisbeth Grönfeldt Bergman	Moderate Party	Göteborg Municipality
298	Eva Olofsson	Left Party	Göteborg Municipality
299	Hans Rothenberg	Moderate Party	Göteborg Municipality
300	Annika Qarlsson	Centre Party	Västra Götaland County North
301	Björn Leivik	Moderate Party	Västra Götaland County North
302	Hans Olsson	Social Democrats	Västra Götaland County South
303	Phia Andersson	Social Democrats	Västra Götaland County South
304	Matilda Ernkrans (substituted (6 October 2006–28 August 2007) by Helena Frisk)	Social Democrats	Örebro County
305	Ameer Sachet	Social Democrats	Örebro County
306	Kent Persson	Left Party	Västmanland County
307	Agneta Berliner	Liberal People's Party	Västmanland County
308	Gunilla Wahlén	Left Party	Västernorrland County
309	Lars Lindén	Christian Democrats	Västernorrland County
310	Solveig Hellquist	Liberal People's Party	Västernorrland County
311	Per Åsling	Centre Party	Jämtland County
312	Karin Åström	Social Democrats	Norrbotten County
313	Leif Pettersson	Social Democrats	Norrbotten County
314	Gustav Blix (substituted (8 September 2008–7 December 2008) by Curt Linderoth)	Moderate Party	Stockholm Municipality
315	Fredrick Federley	Centre Party	Stockholm Municipality
316	Anna König Jerlmyr	Moderate Party	Stockholm Municipality
317	Johan Forssell (replaced (16 November 2006–) by Helena Rivière)	Moderate Party	Stockholm Municipality
315	Per Lodenius	Centre Party	Stockholm County
319	Josefin Brink	Left Party	Stockholm County
320	Karl Sigfrid	Moderate Party	Stockholm County
321	Fredrik Schulte	Moderate Party	Stockholm County
322	Solveig Zander	Centre Party	Uppsala County
323	Helena Leander	Green Party	Uppsala County
324	Magdalena Andersson	Moderate Party	Jönköping County
325	Thomas Strand	Social Democrats	Jönköping County
326	Helena Bouveng	Moderate Party	Jönköping County
327	Annie Johansson	Centre Party	Jönköping County
328	Ann Arleklo	Social Democrats	Skåne County West
329	Marie Weibull Kornias	Moderate Party	Skåne County West
330	Mats Sander	Moderate Party	Skåne County West
331	Anders Hansson	Moderate Party	Skåne County South
332	Max Andersson	Green Party	Göteborg Municipality
333	Karla López (replaced (14 November 2007–) by Lage Rahm)	Green Party	Göteborg Municipality
334	Lars Hjälmered	Moderate Party	Göteborg Municipality
335	Hans Linde	Left Party	Göteborg Municipality
336	Peter Rådberg	Green Party	Västra Götaland County North
337	Mikael Cederbratt	Moderate Party	Västra Götaland County North
338	Jörgen Hellman	Social Democrats	Västra Götaland County North
339	Jan Ericson	Moderate Party	Västra Götaland County South
340	Eva-Lena Jansson	Social Democrats	Örebro County
341	Elisabeth Svantesson	Moderate Party	Örebro County
342	Olle Thorell	Social Democrats	Västmanland County
343	Jessica Polfjärd	Moderate Party	Västmanland County
344	Bertil Kjellberg	Moderate Party	Västernorrland County
345	Eva Sonidsson	Social Democrats	Västernorrland County
346	Lena Asplund	Moderate Party	Västernorrland County
347	Jasenko Omanovic	Social Democrats	Västernorrland County
348	Stefan Tornberg	Centre Party	Norrbotten County
349	Fredrik Lundh	Social Democrats	Norrbotten County

== Members who resigned ==
Seat	Resigned member	Party	Constituency	New member	From
314	Sebastian Cederschiöld	Moderate Party	Stockholm Municipality	Gustav Blix	October 3, 2006
281	Åsa Romson	Green Party	Stockholm Municipality	Per Bolund	October 3, 2006
282	Maria Borelius	Moderate Party	Stockholm County	Mikael Sandström	October 17, 2006
