= Mats Pertoft =

Swedish politician (born 1954)

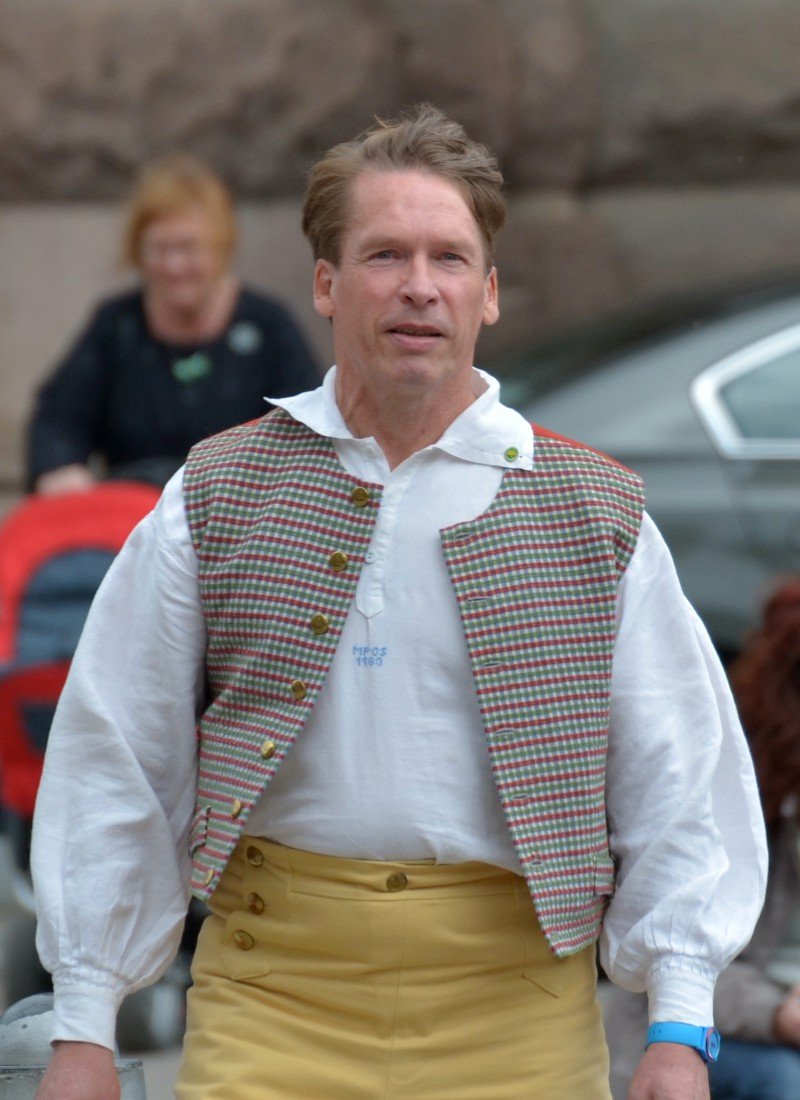
- Pertoft in September 2012

Member of Parliament
- In office 15 September 2011 – 29 September 2014
- Preceded by: Mikaela Valtersson
- Constituency: Stockholm County
- In office 2 October 2006 – 4 October 2010
- Constituency: Stockholm County

Personal details
- Born: 1954 (age 71–72)
- Party: Green Party

Mats Olof Pertoft (born 1954) is a Swedish politician and former member of the Riksdag, the national legislature. A member of the Green Party, he represented Stockholm County between October 2006 and October 2010 and between September 2011 and September 2014. He was also a substitute member of the Riksdag for Annika Hirvonen twice: between December 2015 and August 2016; and between October 2017 and April 2018.

Pertoft is the son of engineer Curt Pertoft and archivist Maj-Britt Pertoft (née Walldén). He was educated in Frankfurt in West Germany and in Gränna. He studied sociology at Goethe University Frankfurt and Eurythmy at Rudolf Steiner University College. He was a port worker in Gothenburg (1979-1981), a substitute teacher (1980-1981), a teacher in Järna (1985-1986), a eurythmy teacher in Stockholm (1986-1990), a teacher and finance manager in Järna (1990-1997) and a finance manager in Ängsholm, Mörkö (1997-2000). He was appointed as a political advisor to the Prime Minister's Office in 2016. He was a member of the municipal council in Södertälje Municipality from 1994 to 2009. He was a member of the county council in Stockholm County from 1998 to 2002.
