= Désirée Liljevall =

Swedish politician (born 1970)

Désirée Liljevall (born 21 September 1970) is a Swedish social democratic politician who was a member of the Riksdag for Kalmar County between 2006 and 2014. She was a member of the Traffic Committee and substitute in the Social Committee, Culture Committee, the parliamentary EU board, and the Nordic Council's Swedish delegate. She also worked with issues about globalisation, sustainable development, and international trade. Liljevall is a marriage officiant in Kalmar Municipality and member of the advisory council in the administration of Kalmar County.

After leaving the Riksdag in 2014, Liljevall entered the business sector in the public relations field.

Liljevall is the mother of two children.

She was previously a member of the Moderate Youth League.
