= Birgitta Eriksson =

Swedish politician (born 1948)

Birgitta Eriksson (born 1948 in Hagfors) is a Swedish Social Democratic Party politician who was a member of the Riksdag from 2006 until 2010.
