= Kerstin Engle =

Swedish politician (born 1947)

Engle presenting herself at the Gothenburg bookfair in 2011.

Kerstin Engle (born 1947) is a Swedish Social Democratic Party politician who has been a member of the Riksdag since 2002.
