= Kerstin Haglö =

Swedish politician (born 1955)

Kerstin Haglö (born 1955), née Andersson, is a Swedish Social Democratic Party politician who has been a member of the Riksdag since 2002.

She was chairperson of the Committee on Justice in 2011.
