= Osama Ali Maher =

Swedish politician

Osama Abdelaziz Mokhtar Ali Maher (born 15 December 1968) is a Swedish conservative politician and Member of Parliament.

Osama Ali Maher was born in Cairo in Egypt. He came to Sweden in 1996. He has worked for the United Nations in Darfur and in Pakistan. He lives in Limhamn in Malmö.
