= Ann Arleklo =

Swedish politician (born 1953)

Ann Arleklo (born 1953) is a Swedish politician of the Social Democratic Party. She has been a member of the Riksdag since 2006.
