= Rolf K. Nilsson =

Swedish politician (born 1956)

Member of the Riksdag
- Incumbent
- Assumed office 2006
- Constituency: Gotland County

Personal details
- Born: 27 March 1956 (age 70) Landskrona, Sweden
- Party: Moderate Party
- Occupation: journalist
- Website: Gotland Först!

Rolf K. Nilsson (born 1956) is a Swedish Moderate Party politician and a member of the Riksdag since 2006. Born in Landskrona, he is a journalist by occupation and now resides in Stenkyrka, Gotland, although he works full-time with politics in Stockholm

He joined the Moderate School Youth (Moderat skolungdom, MSU) in 1970 and was the chairman of the Helsingborg chapter 1975-1976. The years 1978-1979 and 1982-1983 he was chairman of the Moderate Youth League (Moderata Ungdomsförbundet, MUF) in Helsingborg. In 1979, he worked as election ombudsman for the Moderate Party in Helsingborg, and he worked as ombudsman for MUF 1980-1982.

He studied to become a journalist, moved to Gothenburg in 1987, and became a secretary in the editorial office of the newspaper Morgonposten, eventually becoming editor-in-chief in 1990. In 1993, he started his own company - RoMa-media. That kept him busy until he in 1995 got the job as editorialist and editor of culture of the newspaper Västernorrlands Allehanda in Härnösand. In 1997, he applied for the job of editor-in-chief of Gotlands Allehanda, got it, and has been editor-in-chief and editorialist since then up until his leave of absence in 2006 due to his election the Riksdag.
