= Billy Gustafsson =

Swedish politician (1948–2018)

Billy Gustafsson (8 February 1948 – 6 April 2018) was a Swedish Social Democratic Party politician who was a member of the Riksdag 2002–2014.

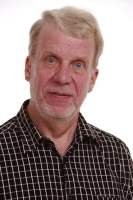
Billy Gustafsson
