= Helena Rivière =

Swedish politician

Helena Rivière (born 17 August 1940 in Karlskoga) is a Swedish Moderate Party politician. She was a member of the Riksdag from 2006 to 2010.
