= Carin Runeson =

Swedish politician (born 1947)

Carin Runeson (born 1947), is a Swedish social democratic politician who was a member of the Riksdag from 2006 to 2014.
