= Tommy Ternemar =

Swedish politician (born 1947)

Tommy Ternemar, born 1947, is a Swedish social democratic politician who was member of the Riksdag from 2002 to 2010.
