= Karl Gustav Abramsson =

Swedish politician (born 1947)

Karl Gustav Abramsson (born 11 November 1947 in Stensele) is a Swedish Social Democratic politician who has been a member of the Riksdag from 1998 to 2010.

== See also ==
- List of members of the Riksdag, 1998–2002
- List of members of the Riksdag, 2002–2006
- List of members of the Riksdag, 2006–2010
