= Kurt Kvarnström =

Swedish politician (born 1948)

Kurt Kvarnström (born 1948) is a Swedish social democratic politician who has been a member of the Riksdag since 2002.
