= Christina Axelsson =

Swedish politician (born 1949)

Christina Axelsson (born 1949) is a Swedish Social Democratic politician who has been a member of the Riksdag since 2002, she was substitute in the Riksdag from 1995 to 2002.
