= Anne Ludvigsson =

Swedish politician (born 1950)

Member of the Riksdag
- In office 2002–2010

Personal details
- Born: October 26, 1950 (age 75)
- Party: Social Democratic Party
- Occupation: Politician

Anne Ludvigsson (born 26 October 1950) is a Swedish social democratic politician who was a member of the Riksdag from 2002 to 2010.
