= Renée Jeryd =

Swedish politician (born 1965)

Renée Jeryd (born 1965) is a Swedish social democratic politician. She has been a member of the Riksdag since 2008.
