= Marie Weibull Kornias =

Swedish politician (born 1954)

Marie Weibull Kornias (born 1954) is a Swedish Moderate Party politician. She was a member of the Riksdag from 2006 to 2010.
