= Maria Kornevik-Jakobsson =

Swedish politician (born 1953)

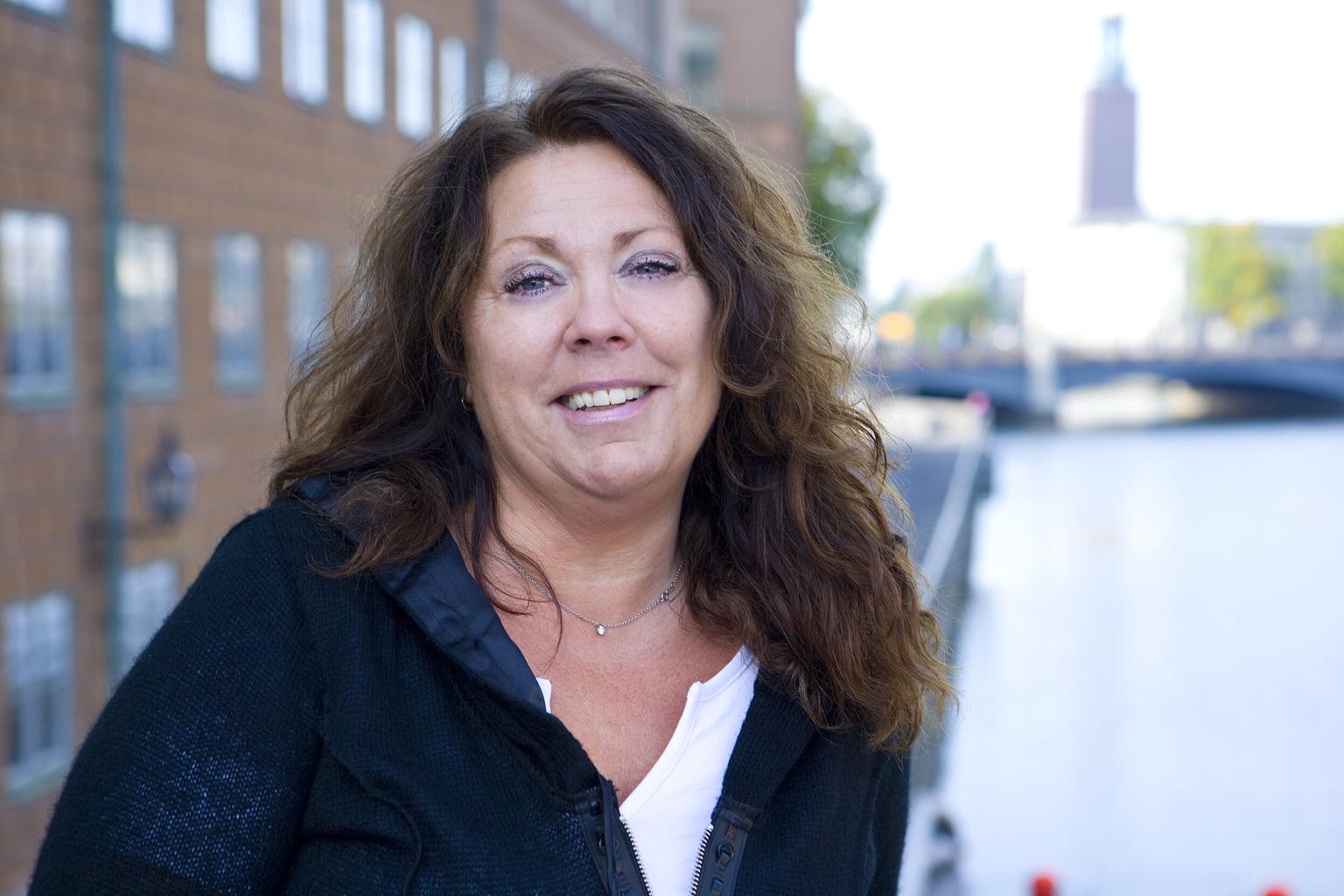

Member of the Riksdag
- In office 2006–2010

Personal details
- Political party: Centre Party

Maria Kornevik-Jakobsson, born in 1953, is a Swedish politician of the Centre Party. She became a substitute member of the Riksdag in 2006. In 2007 Kornevik-Jakobsson replaced Åsa Torstensson who is on leave.
