= Christer Adelsbo =

Swedish politician (born 1962)

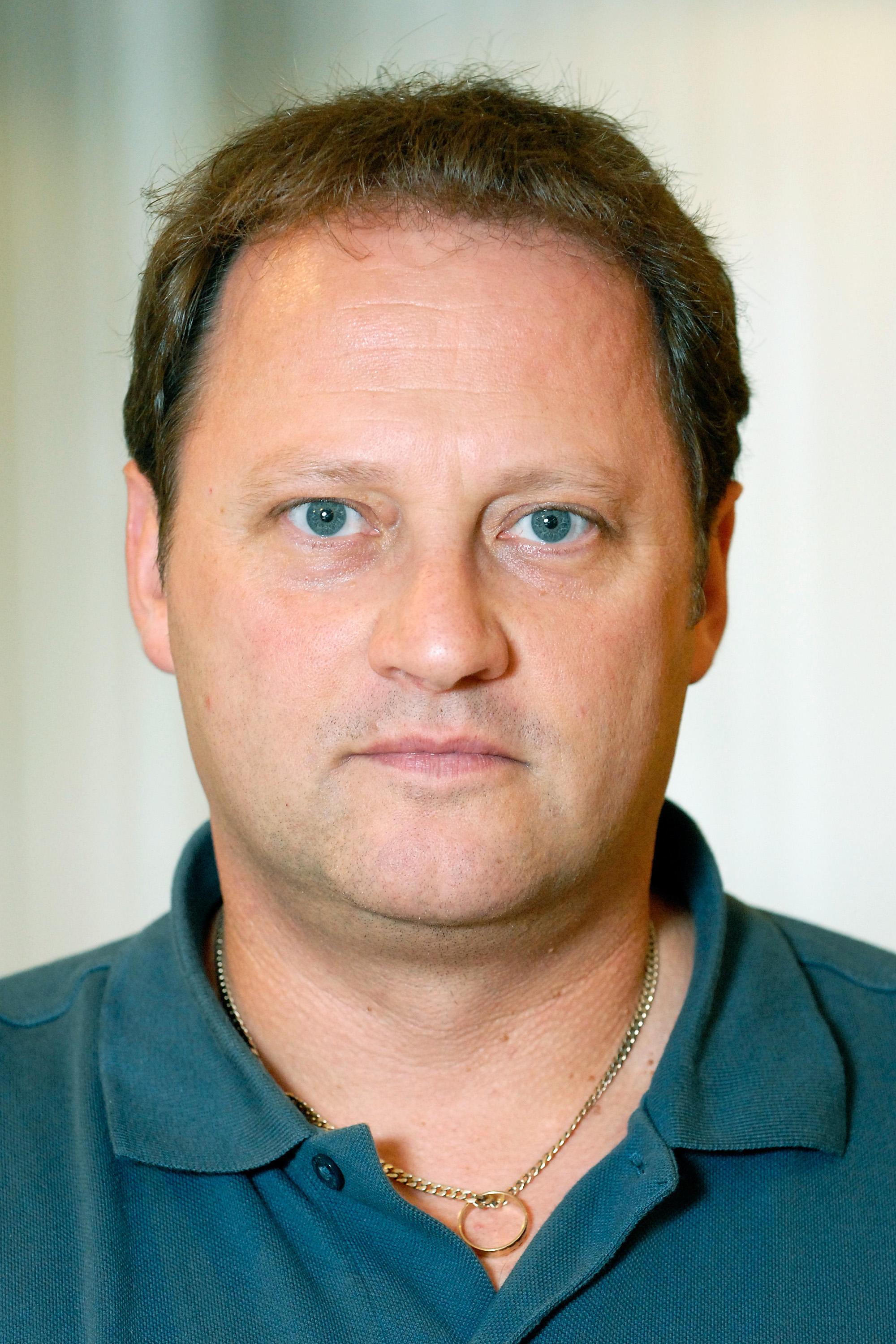

Christer Adelsbo, born 1962, is a Swedish Social Democratic politician who has been a member of the Riksdag since 2002.
