= LiseLotte Olsson =

Swedish politician (born 1954)

LiseLotte Olsson (born 1954) is a Swedish Left Party politician. She was a member of the Riksdag from 2006 to 2010.
