= Lars Johansson (politician) =

Swedish politician (born 1950)

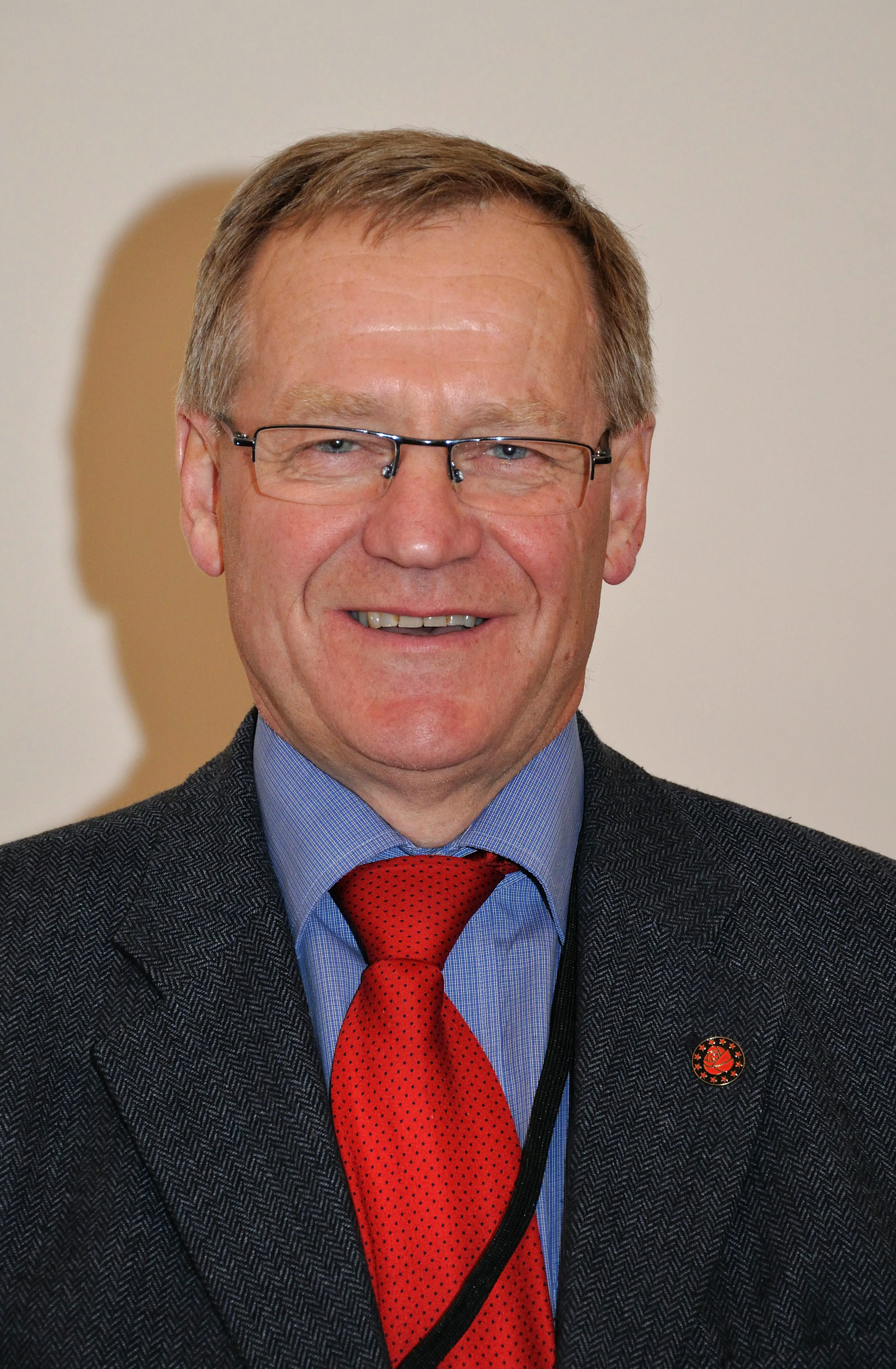
Lars Johansson in January 2011

Lars Johansson (born 29 May 1950) is a Swedish social democratic politician, and member of the Riksdag since 2002.
