= Lena Olsson =

Swedish politician (born 1958)

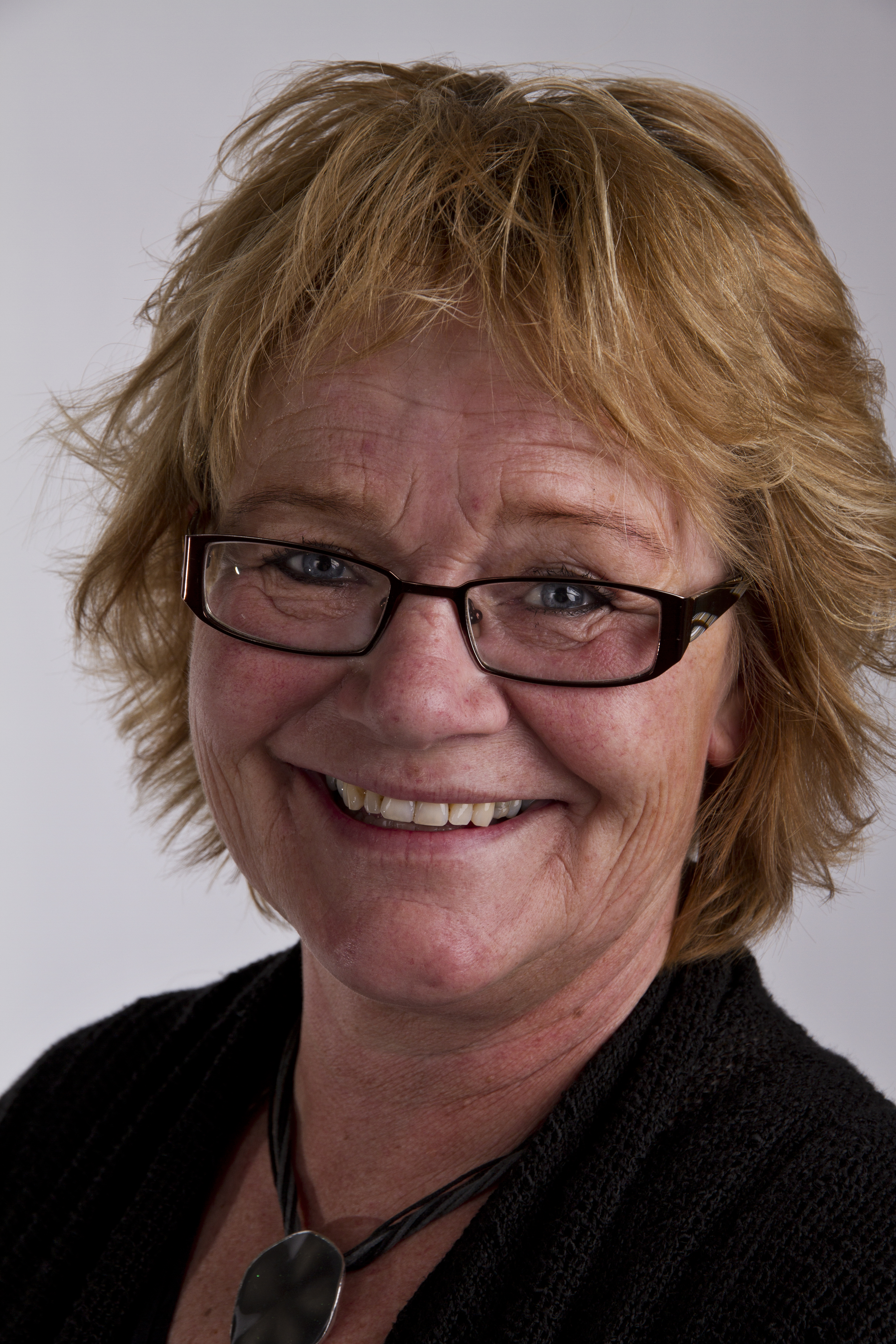
Lena Olsson

Lena Olsson (born 1958) is a Swedish Left Party politician. She was a member of the Riksdag until 2006. She was also a member from 1998 to 2002. She was a member of Parliament up to 2014.
