= Louise Malmström =

Swedish politician (born 1972)

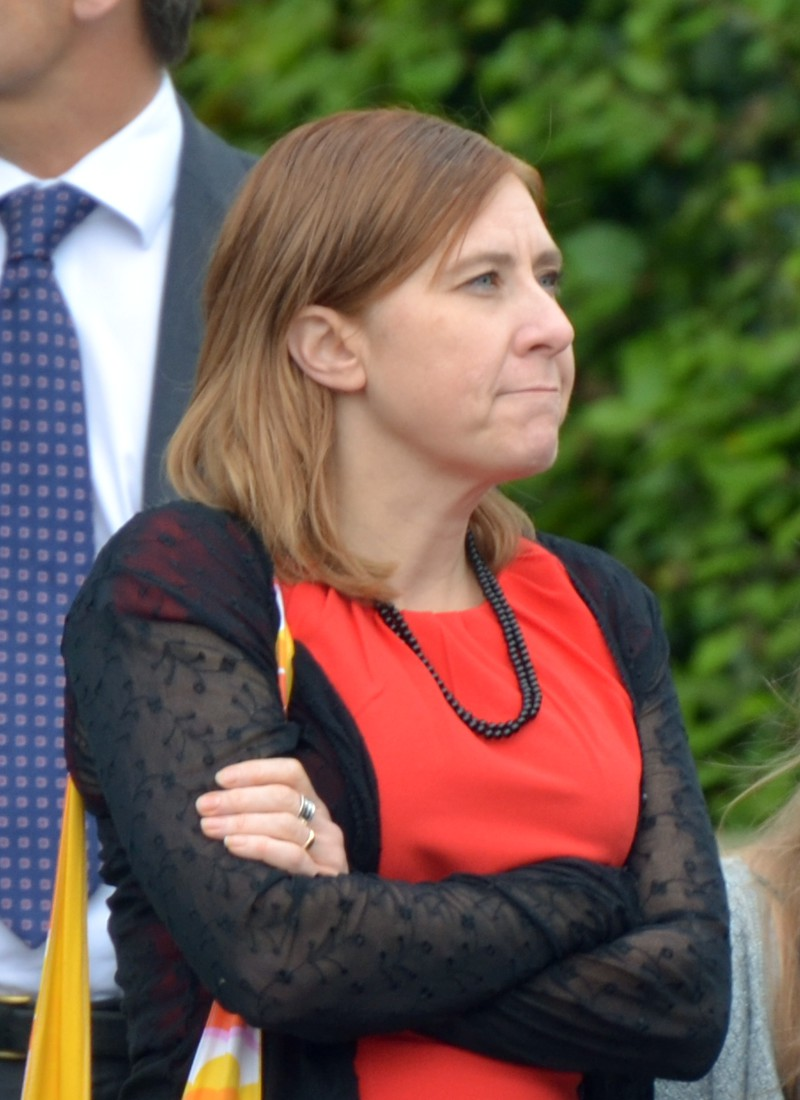

Louise Malmström (born 1972), is a Swedish social democratic politician who has been a member of the Riksdag since 2002.
