= Magdalena Streijffert =

Swedish politician (born 1977)

Magdalena Streijffert (born 1977) is a Swedish social democratic politician. She was a member of the Riksdag between 2006 and 2010.
