= Mikaela Valtersson =

Swedish politician (born 1967)

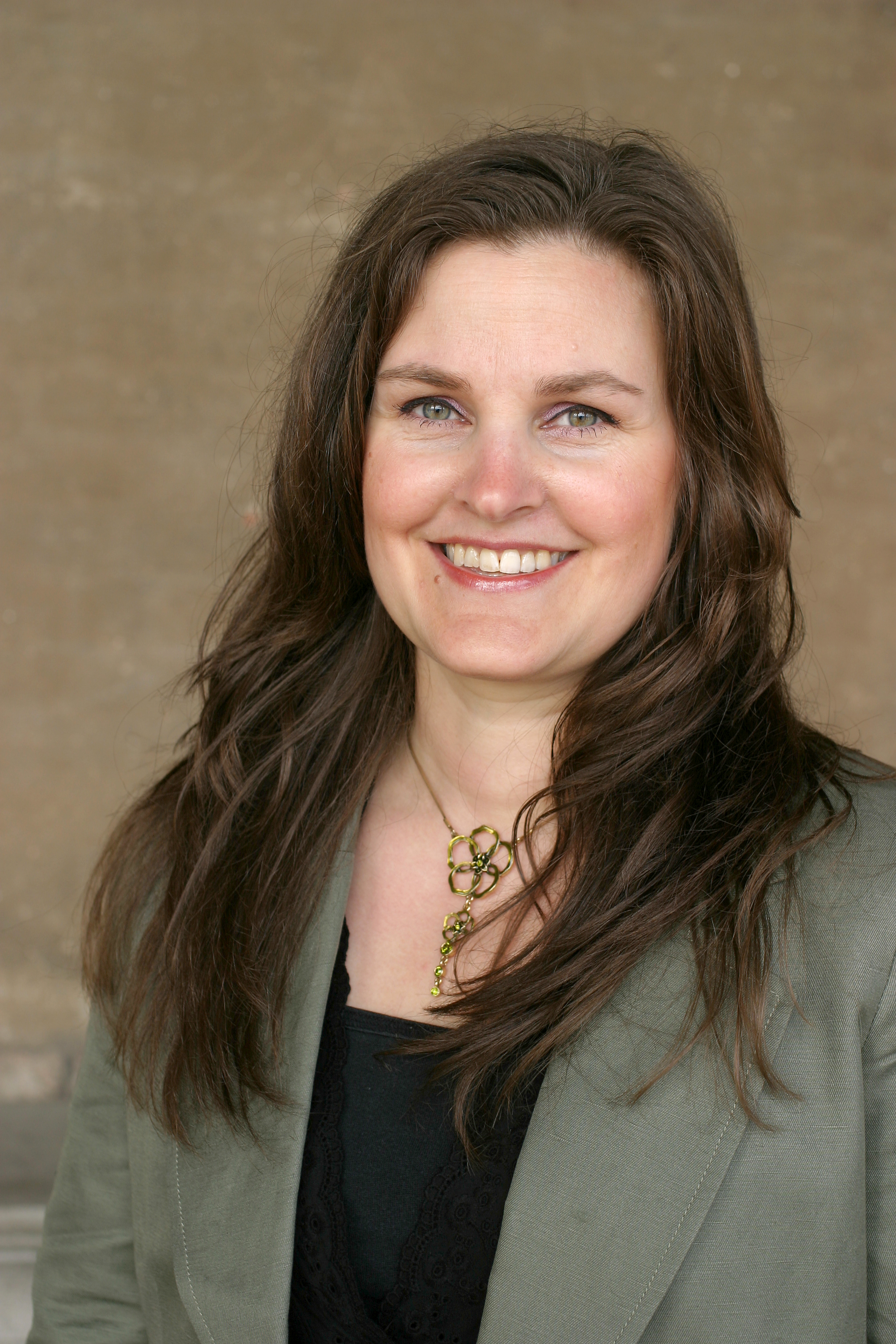
- Mikaela Valtersson

Member of the Riksdag for Stockholm
- In office 2002–2011

Personal details
- Born: 6 January 1967 (age 59) Krylbo, Dalarna, Sweden
- Party: Green Party

Mikaela Valtersson (born 6 January 1967) is a Swedish Green Party politician. She was a member of the Riksdag from 2002 until 2011.
