= Elina Linna =

Swedish politician (born 1947)

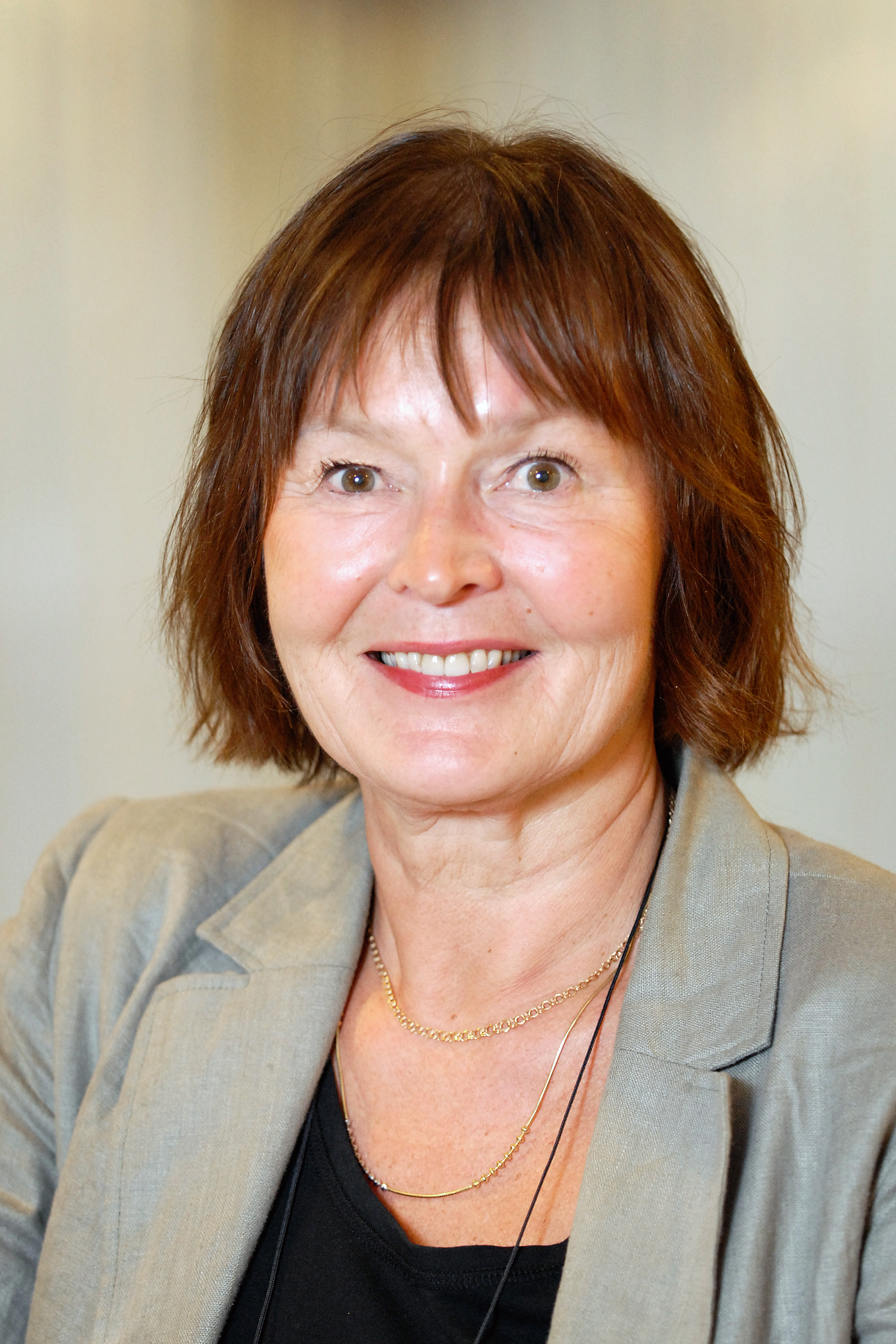

Elina Linna, born 1947, is a Swedish Left Party politician who has been a member of the Riksdag since 2002.
