= Lennart Levi =

Swedish physician, researcher, social activist and politician (1930–2024)

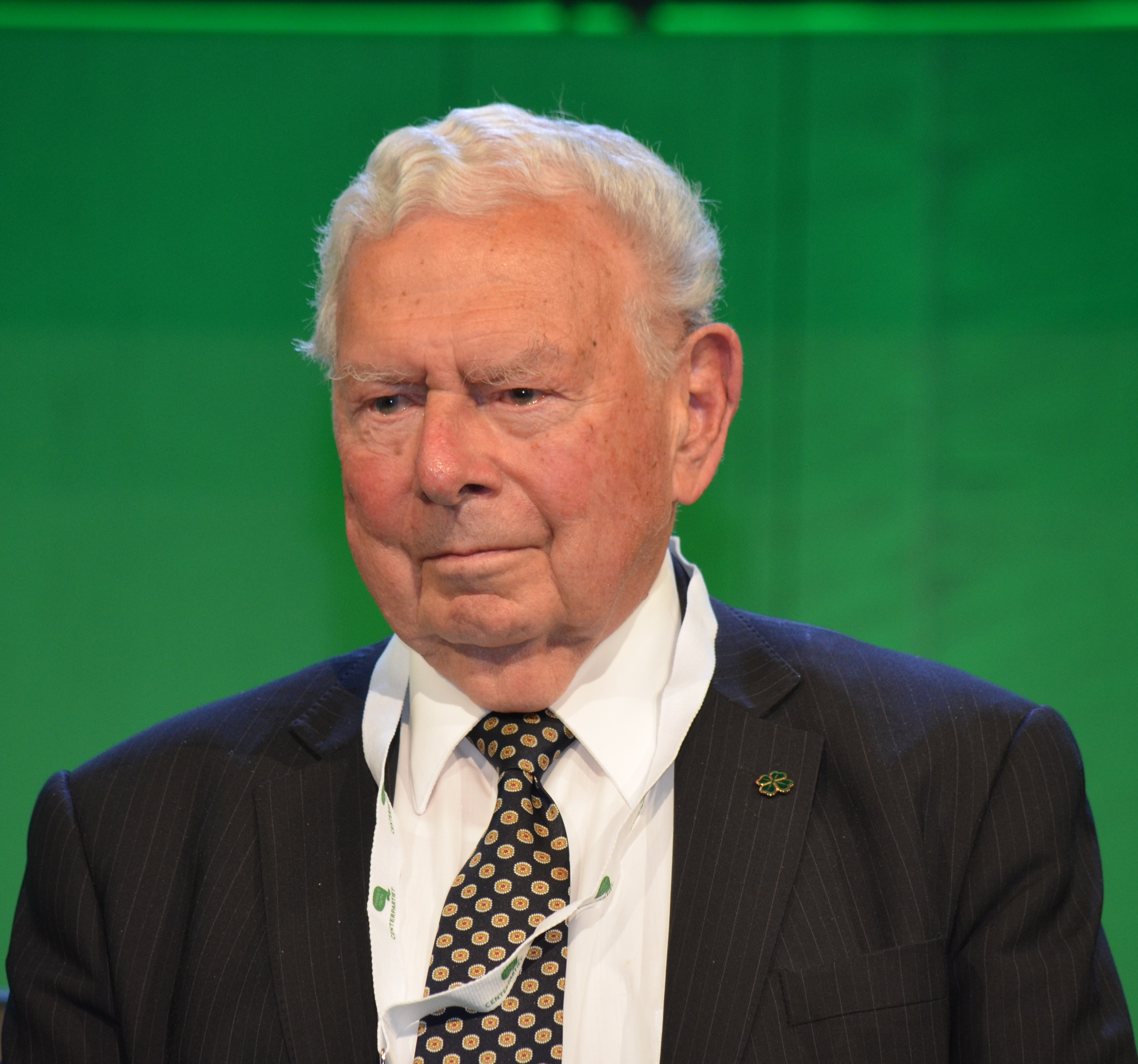
- Levi in September 2015

Member of the Riksdag
- In office 2006–2010
- Constituency: Stockholm County

Personal details
- Born: 20 May 1930 Riga, Latvia
- Died: 18 February 2024 (aged 93)
- Party: Centre Party
- Spouse: Isabella Weitman
- Children: Jan Richard, George Ragnar
- Occupation: Physician and researcher

Lennart Levi, M.D., PhD (1930–2024) was a Swedish physician, professor, and politician. He was a member of the Riksdag from 2006 to 2010, representing the Stockholm County constituency.

== Biography ==
Levi was born in Riga, Latvia, on May 20, 1930, to Sam Levi, a merchant, and Debora Lowenstein. During World War II, his family moved to Stockholm when he was 10 years old. He served as a surgeon in the Swedish Army after receiving his medical degree from the Karolinska Institute in 1959 and his PhD in 1972. In 1957, he married Isabella Weitman, and they had two children, Jan Richard and George Ragnar.

At the Karolinska Institute, Levi established an entirely new discipline: stress research with physicians, psychologists, and sociologists. The stress concept that his group used had been recently introduced by the Bohemian-Canadian physiologist Hans Selye. All the physiological reactions that are started when an individual needs to mobilize large amounts of energy are collected under the umbrella “stress”.

Despite substantial resistance from the scientific establishment and other difficulties, he managed to start stress research in the late 1950s, first in a small laboratory and finally in a national institute with support from Ulf von Euler, who described the role of adrenaline and noradrenaline in energy mobilization, for which he was awarded the Nobel Prize in Physiology and Medicine in 1970. Euler enabled the start of Levi's chemical laboratory for the analysis of urinary excretion of adrenaline and noradrenaline. The physiological focus was initially on urinary catecholamine excretion, but the sphere was gradually extended to the immune system, cardiovascular functions and metabolism, as well as several stress-related hormones. In 1972 Levi defended his PhD thesis and started the creation of a national institute which was inaugurated in 1980.

Levi's work was deeply engaged in the development and consequences of a poor/good psychosocial work environment and in longitudinal research on the psychological and physiological consequences of unemployment, and they published their findings extensively. The institute became engaged in a close collaboration with the National Bureau of Statistics.

The politically neutral position of Selye's stress concept may have aided Lennart Levi in the acceptance of this new line of research. Political parties both to the right and the left could see the point in giving resources to it. The activities expanded, and epidemiological methods were used. Transdisciplinary study was important. For example, a large project was devoted to the consequences of unemployment.

Lennart Levi was also heavily engaged in international work in which he emphasized the importance of psychosocial factors and stress prevention. He was asked to perform keynote speeches in many international organizations in the US, UK, Germany and the Nordic countries. The WHO, ILO and EU were important partners. He was frequently engaged in societal debates.

Levi was elected as a member of the Swedish parliament during the period 2006–2010. On September 26th, 2014, he played a critical role in the creation of the Poznan Declaration: Whole-Of-University Promotion of Social Capital, Health and Development, in which it is stated that “Our major challenges are therefore how to promote good government, ethical business and individual behavior—and how to avoid the bad ones, and their detrimental effects on social capital, health and development.”
