= Lisbeth Grönfeldt Bergman =

Swedish politician (born 1948)

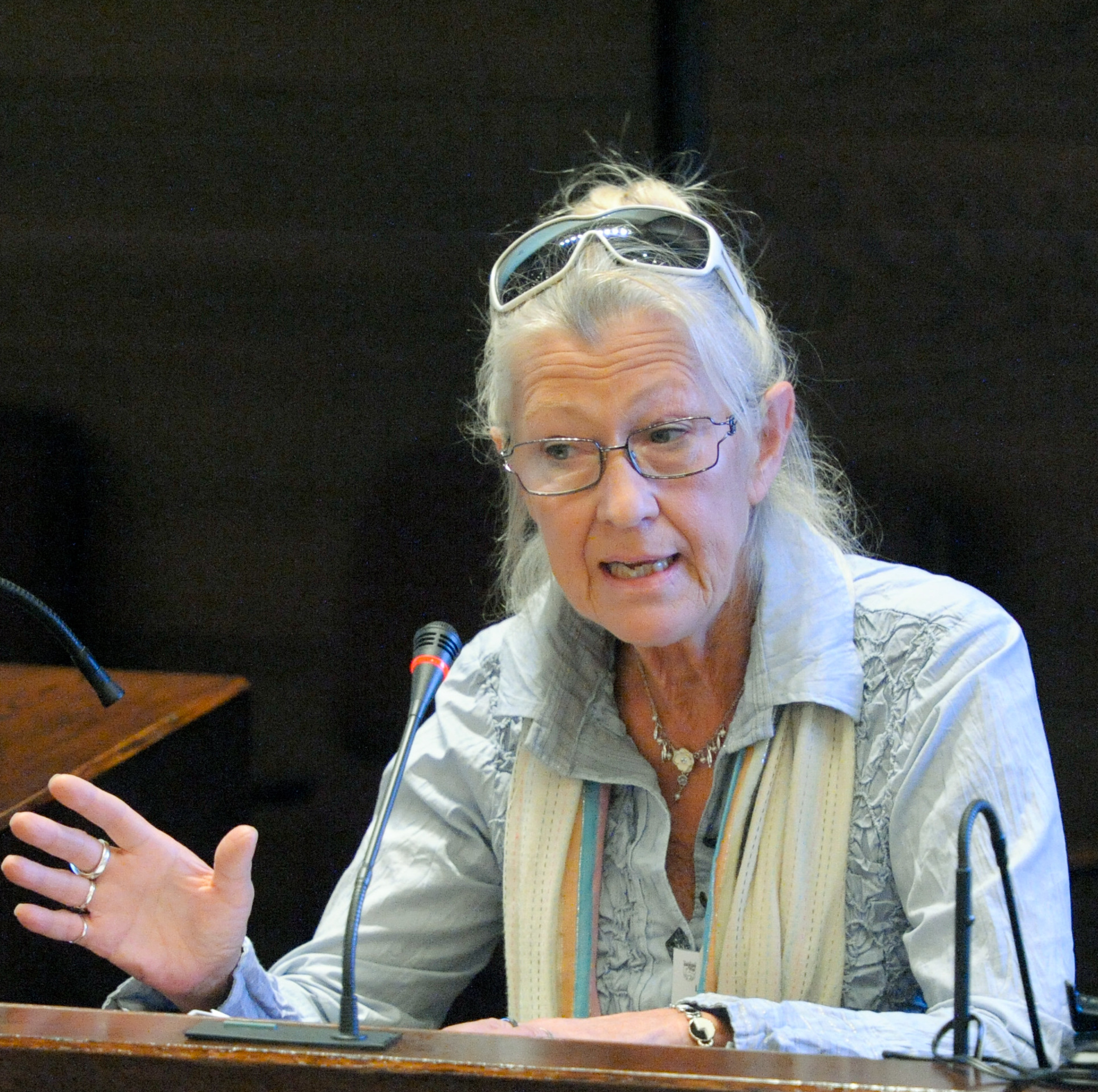
Lisbeth Grönfeldt Bergman in 2010

Lisbeth Grönfeldt Bergman (born 1948), is a Swedish politician of the Moderate Party. She has been a member of the Riksdag since 2006. She was Member of the European Parliament (MEP) from 1999 to 2004.
