= Sven Yngve Persson =

Swedish politician (born 1960)

Sven Yngve Persson (born 1960 in Hasslarp) is a Swedish politician of the Moderate Party. He was a member of the Riksdag from 2006 to 2010 and a replacement member of the Riksdag in 2006.
