= Claes Västerteg =

Swedish politician (born 1972)

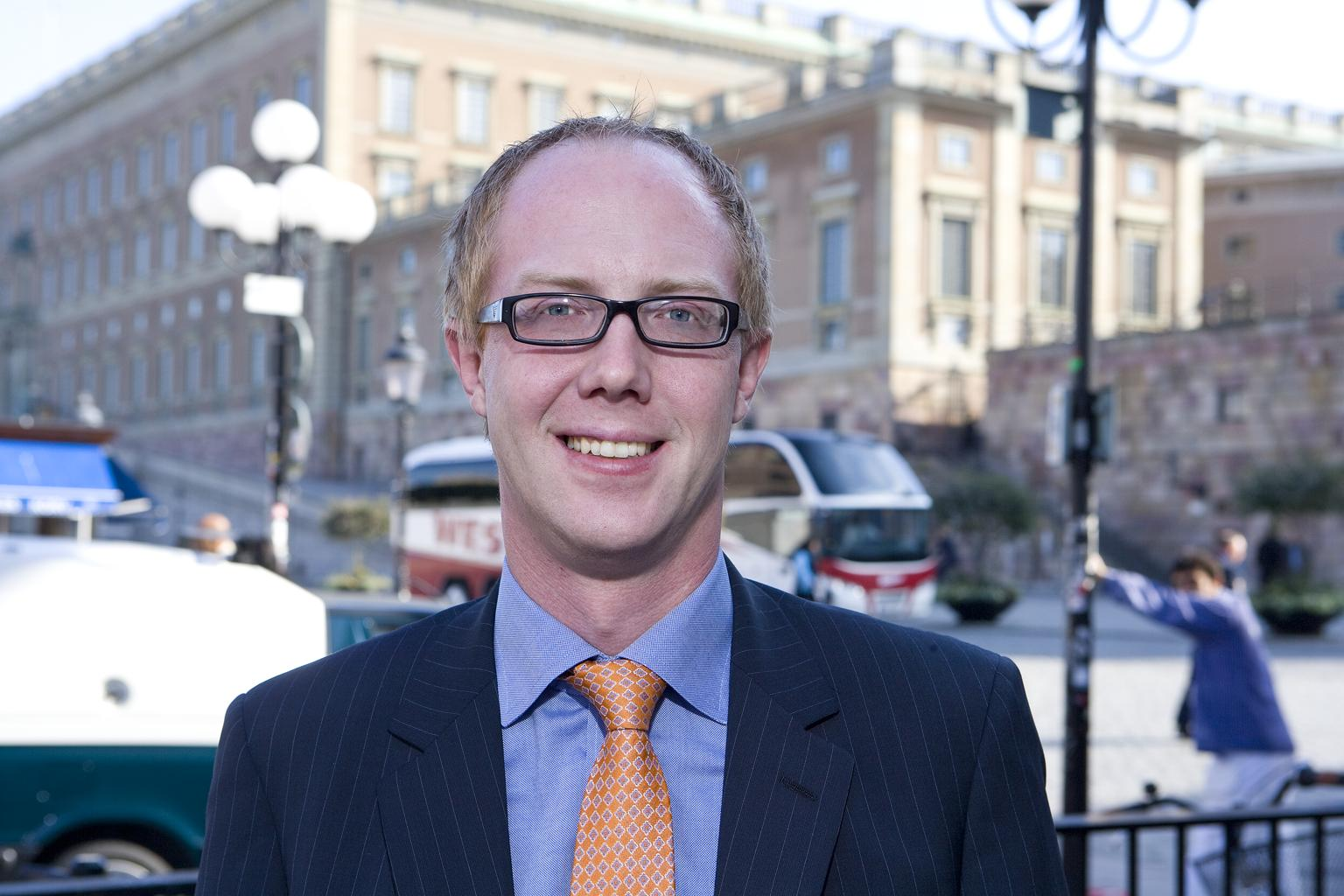
Claes Västerteg.

Claes Västerteg (born 1972) is a Swedish Centre Party politician, member of the Riksdag from 2002 to 2010. Claes represented the south of Västra Götaland county.
