= Ameer Sachet =

Swedish politician (born 1963)

Ameer Sachet (born 1963 in Baghdad, Iraq) is a Swedish politician of the Social Democratic Party. He has been a member of the Riksdag since 2006 and a replacement member of the Riksdag in 2002 to 2006.
