= Bertil Kjellberg =

Swedish politician (born 1953)

Bertil Kjellberg (born 1953) is a Swedish politician of the Moderate Party. He has been a member of the Riksdag since 2002.
