= Erik A. Eriksson =

Swedish politician (born 1969)

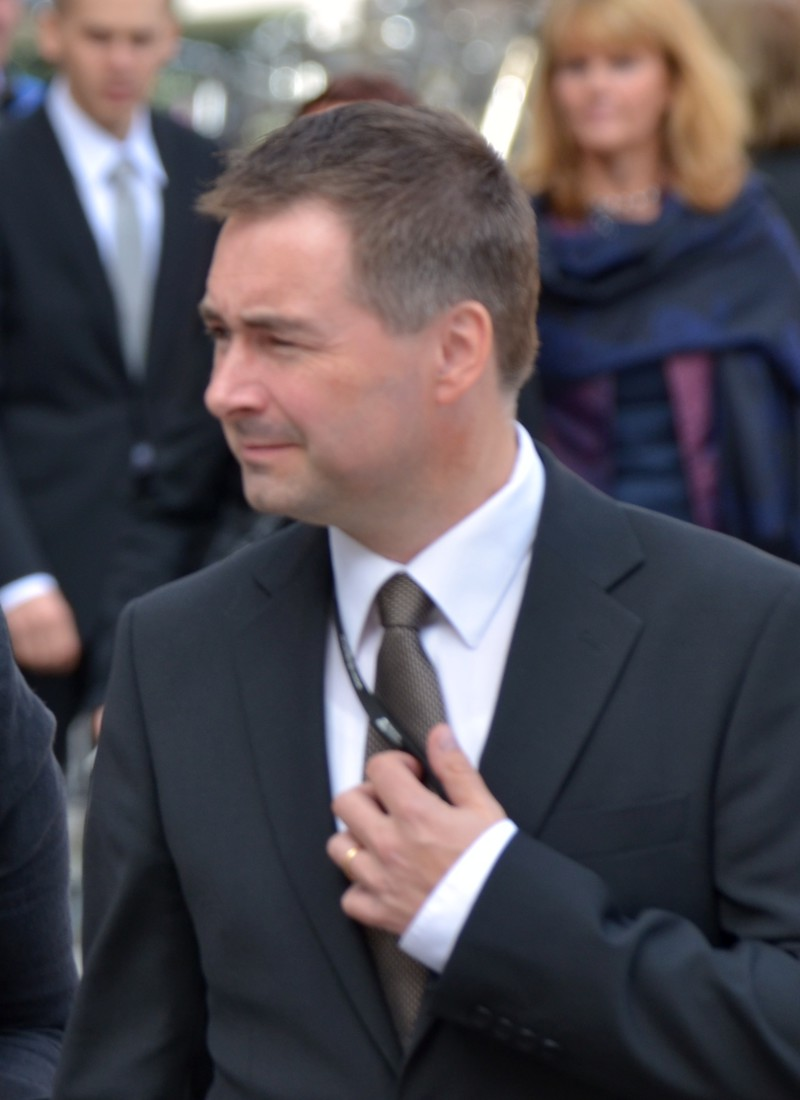
Erik A Eriksson.

Erik A. Eriksson (born 1969) is a Swedish politician. He is a member of the Centre Party. He has been a member of the Riksdag since 2006.
