= Staffan Appelros =

Swedish politician

Staffan Appelros (born 16 December 1950), is a Swedish politician. He was a member of the Riksdag for the Moderate Party between 2007 and 2010 as a replacement for the Minister for Migration and Asylum Policy, Tobias Billström.

== Biography ==
Appelros began his political work within the Liberals Party in Malmö municipality and was chairman of the immigration committee in 1993–1994. He has also been vice chairman of the city planning committee and also sat on the district committee at Rosengård. He has also held board assignments in, among others, Malmö Lokaltrafik, and Sysav.
