= Göran Montan =

Swedish politician

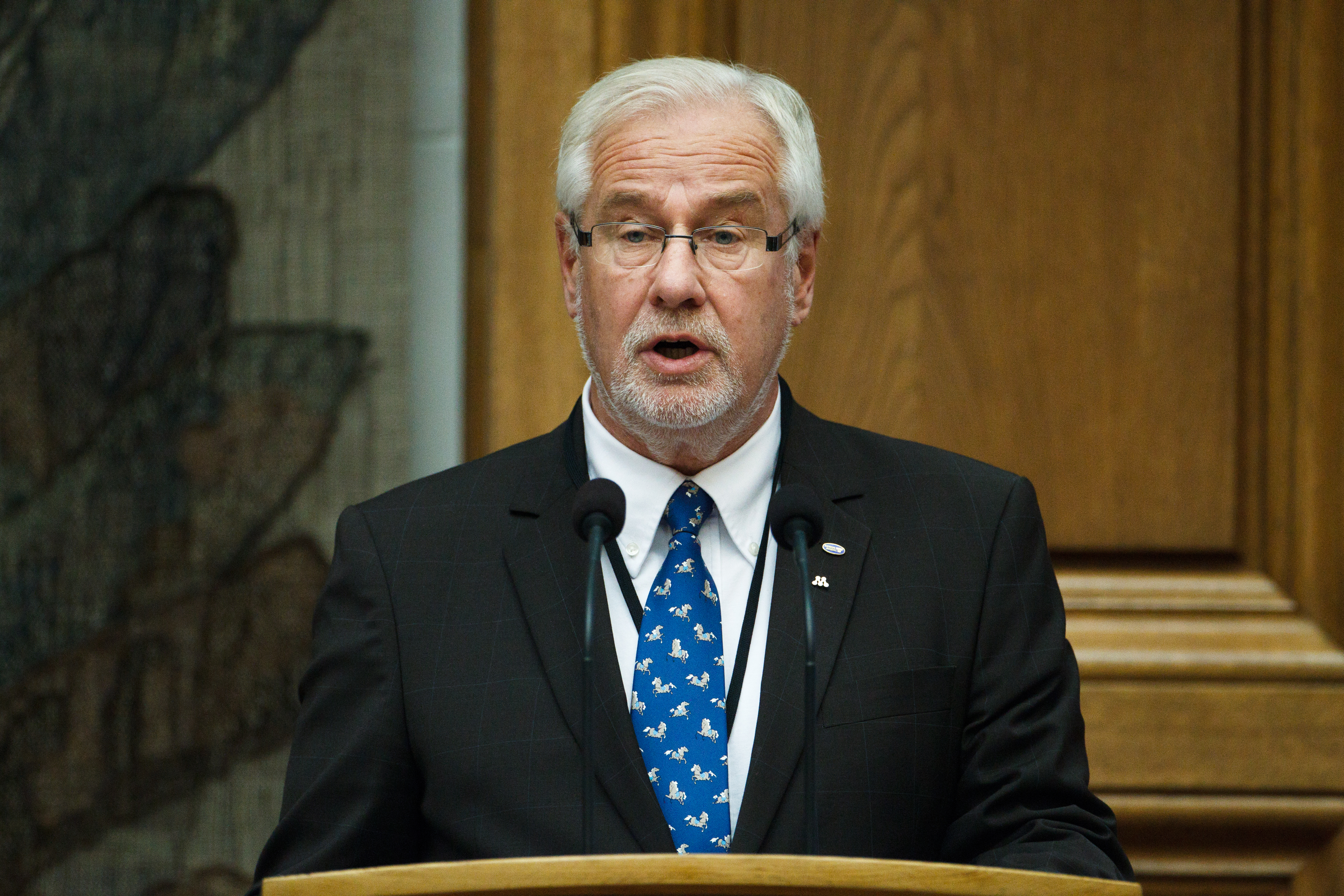

Göran Montan (born 1946) is a Swedish politician of the Moderate Party. He was a member of the Riksdag from 2006 to 2014.
