= Kalle Larsson =

Swedish politician (born 1969)

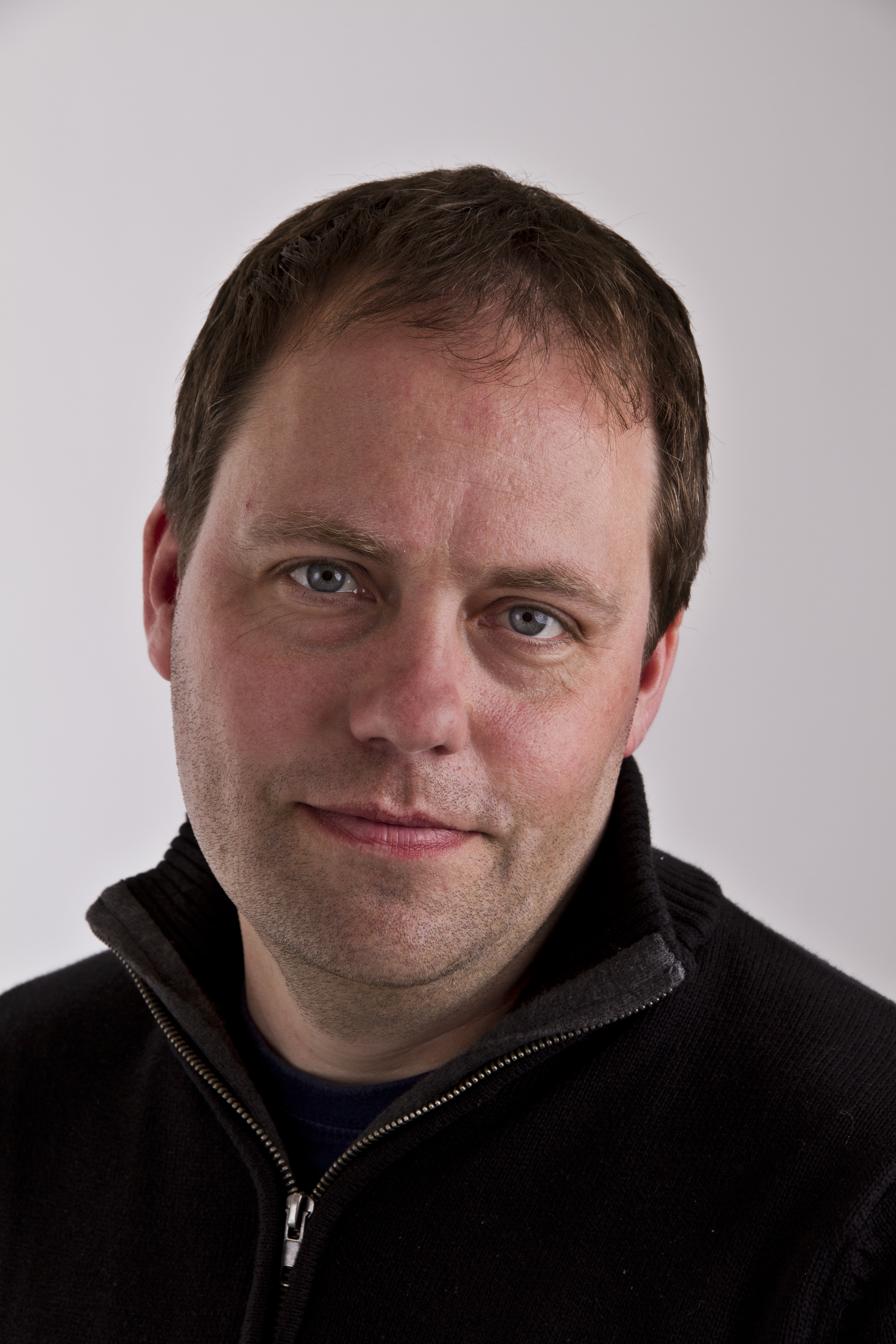
Kalle Larsson.

Karl "Kalle" Larsson (born 1969) is a Swedish politician active in the leadership of the Left Party, and a member of the Riksdag 1998–2010. Following the 2006 party congress Larsson was elected to the Executive Committee of the party.
