= Roland Bäckman =

Swedish politician (born 1960)

Member of the Riksdag
- In office 18 September 2007 – 4 October 2010
- Preceded by: Ulrica Messing
- Constituency: Gävleborg County

Personal details
- Born: 1960 (age 65–66)
- Party: Social Democratic Party

Roland Bäckman (born 1960) is a Swedish politician and former member of the Riksdag, the national legislature. A member of the Social Democratic Party, he represented Gävleborg County between September 2007 and October 2010. He was also a substitute member of the Riksdag for Ulrica Messing in October 2006.
