= Karin Nilsson =

Swedish politician (born 1956)

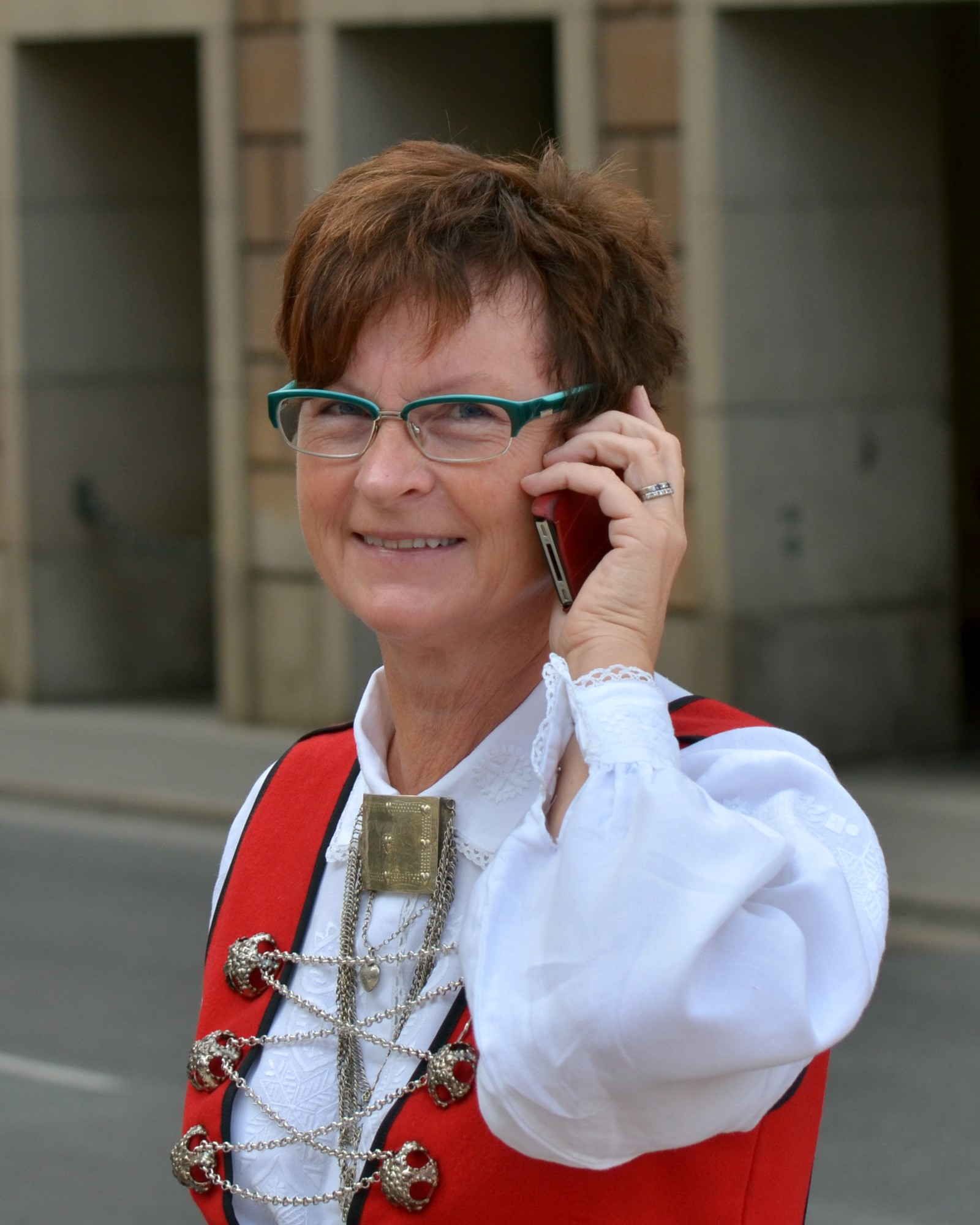

member of the Riksdag
- In office 2006–2014

Personal details
- Born: 1956 (age 68–69)
- Political party: Centre Party

Karin Nilsson (born 1956) is a Swedish politician of the Centre Party, substitute member of the Riksdag since 2006.
