= Gustav Blix =

Swedish politician (born 1974)

Gustav Blix (born August 31, 1974) is a Swedish politician of the Moderate Party. He was a member of the Riksdag from 2006 to 2014.
