= Reza Khelili Dylami =

Swedish politician (born 1967)

Reza Khelili Dylami (Persian: رضا خلیلی دیلمی; born in 1967) is a Swedish politician of the Moderate Party. He was a member of the Riksdag from 2006 to 2010, replacing Beatrice Ask due to her service as the Minister for Justice from 2006 to 2008 and as ordinarie member from 2008 to 2010.

Khelili Dylami is originally of Iranian descent.
