= Marianne Kierkemann =

Swedish politician (born 1950)

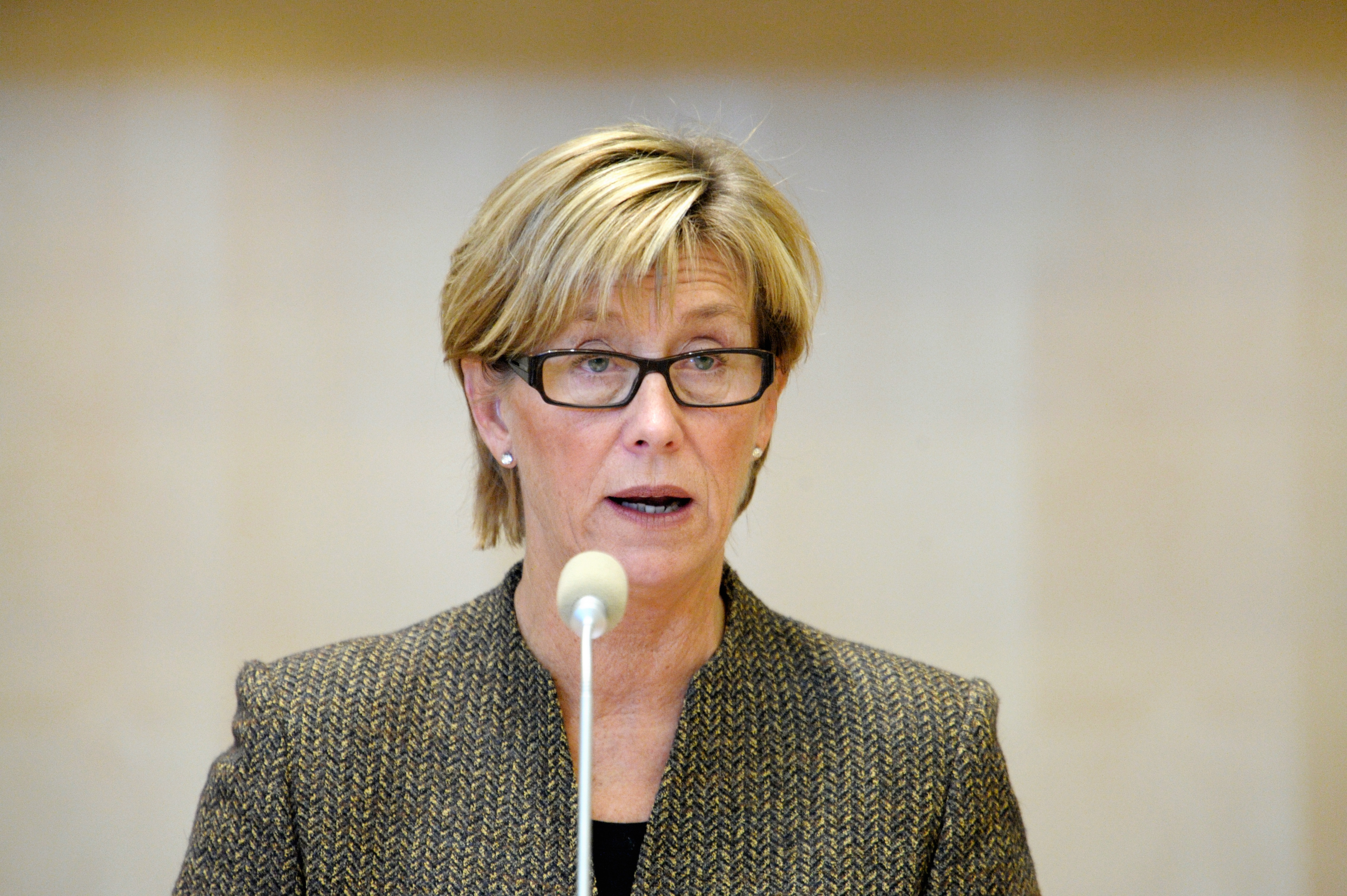
Marianne Kierkemann in Stockholm, 2019

Marianne Kierkemann (born 1950) is a Swedish politician of the Moderate Party. She has been a member of the Riksdag since 2006 and a replacement member of the Riksdag in 2005.
