= Kjell Eldensjö =

Swedish politician (born 1941)

Kjell Eldensjö (born 1941) is a Swedish Christian Democratic politician. He was a member of the Riksdag from 1991 to 2010 with taking breaks between 1994 and 1998 and 2002 to 2006. He is also an engineer.
