= Eva Johnsson =

Swedish politician (born 1958)

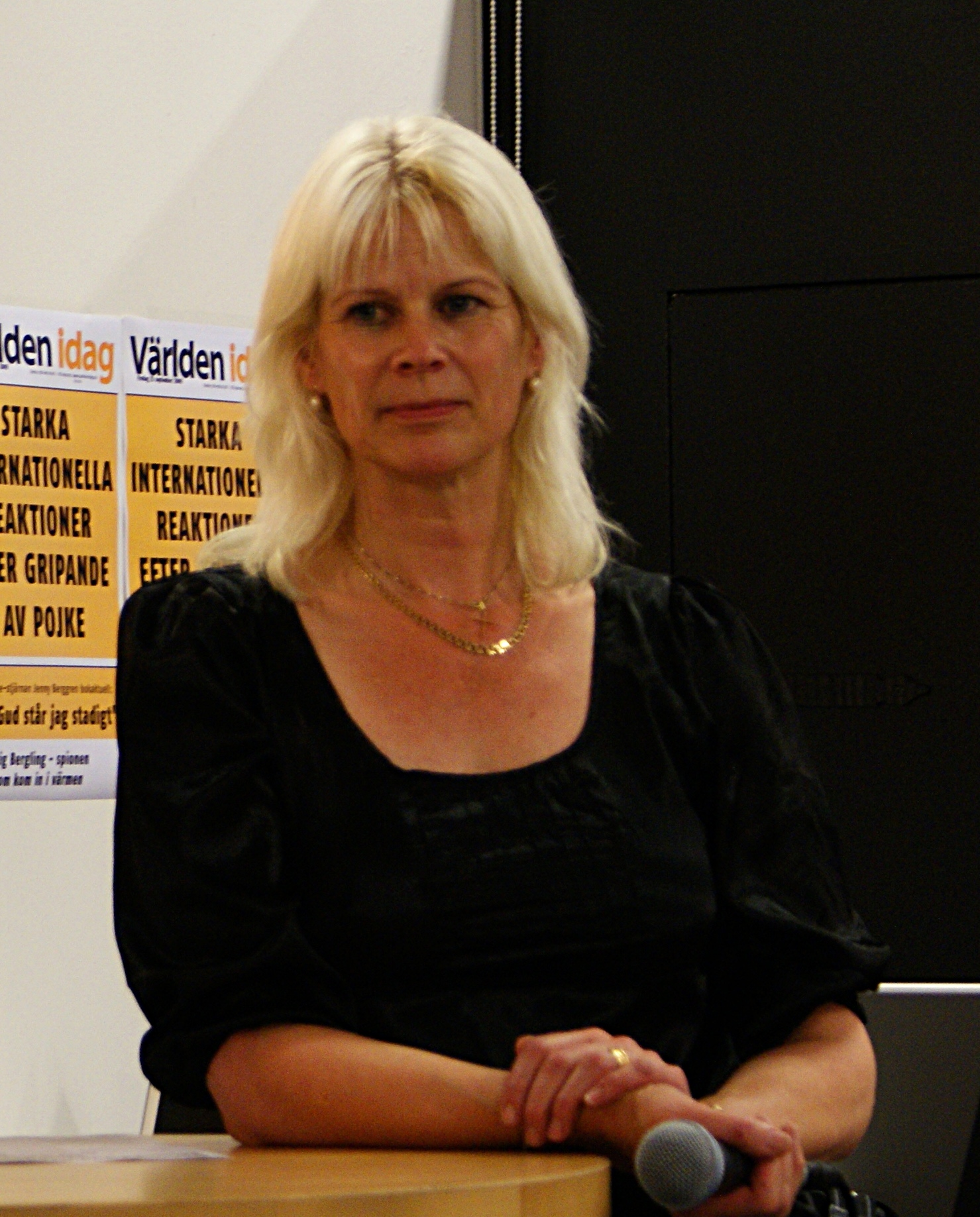
Eva Johnsson

Eva Johnsson (born 1958) is a Swedish Christian Democratic politician. She has been a member of the Riksdag since 2006.
