= Nils Oskar Nilsson =

Swedish politician (1935–2018)

Nils Oskar Nilsson (23 August 1935 – 31 December 2018) was a Swedish politician of the Moderate Party. He was a member of the Riksdag, the Parliament of Sweden, from 2006 to 2010, representing Stockholm County, and served as a replacement member of the Riksdag from 2003 to 2004.
