= Mahmood Fahmi =

Swedish politician (born 1965)

- Constituency: Stockholms kommun

Personal details
- Born: 1965 (age 60–61)
- Party: Moderate Party
- Occupation: Surveyist/Therapist
- Website: www.riksdagen.se/webbnav/index.aspx?nid=1111&iid=0394601078212

Mahmood Fahmi is a Swedish parliamentary politician and member of the Moderate Party.
