= Egon Frid =

Swedish politician (born 1957)

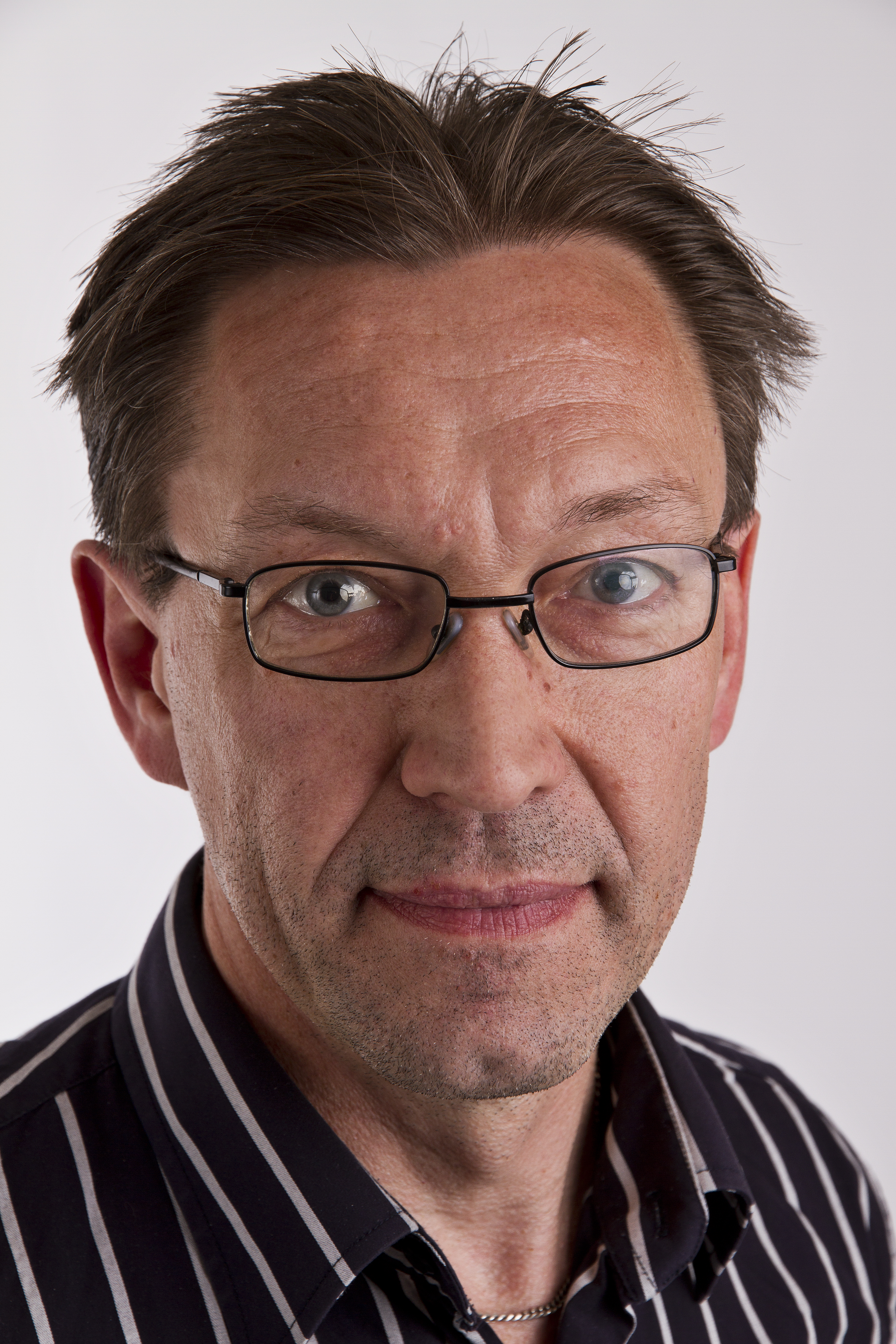
- Frid in May 2010

Member of the Riksdag
- In office 2 October 2006 – 4 October 2010
- Constituency: Västra Götaland County East

Personal details
- Born: 1957 (age 68–69)
- Party: Left Party

Stig Egon Frid (born 1957) is a Swedish politician and former member of the Riksdag, the national legislature. A member of the Left Party, he represented Västra Götaland County East between October 2006 and October 2010.
