= Maria Lundqvist-Brömster =

Swedish politician

Maria Lundqvist-Brömster (born 1956) is a Swedish Liberal People's Party politician. She has been a member of the Riksdag since 2006.
