= Mats G. Nilsson =

Swedish politician

Mats G. Nilsson (born 1968 in Blekinge) is a Swedish politician of the Moderate Party. He was a member of the Riksdag from 2006 to 2010.
