= Lage Rahm =

Swedish politician (born 1980)

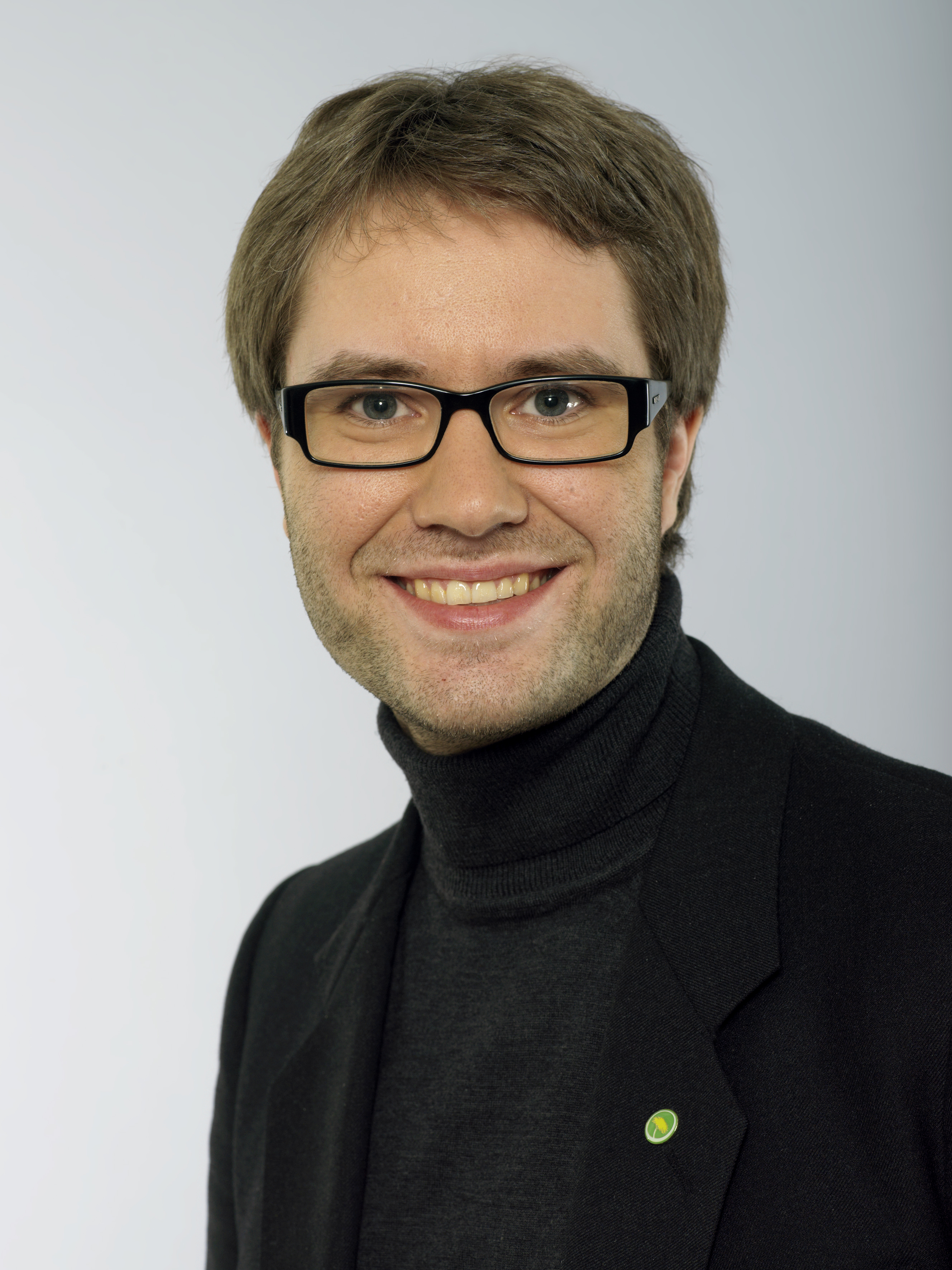
Lage Rahm in 2008

Erik Lage Rahm (born 27 January 1980) is a Swedish politician for the Green Party (Miljöpartiet). He was a Member of Parliament between November 2007 and October 2010, during which he worked with defence issues in the Defence Committee (försvarsutskottet) and the Committee on Foreign Affairs (utrikesutskottet).
