= Inge Garstedt =

Swedish politician (born 1947)

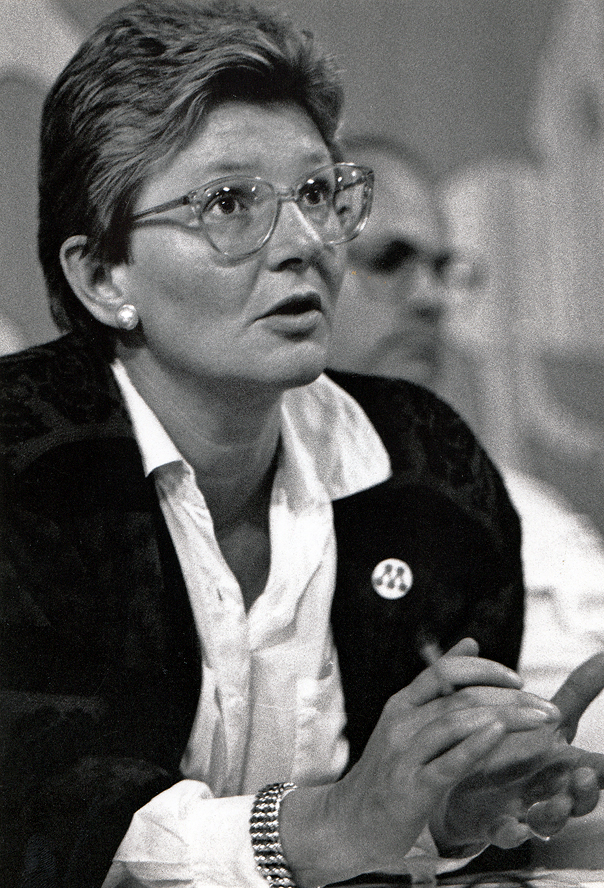
Inge Garstedt

Inge Garstedt (born 1947) is a Swedish politician of the Moderate Party. She has been a member of the Riksdag since 2006 and a replacement member of the Riksdag in 1991.
