= Tone Tingsgård =

Swedish politician (born 1944)

Tone Tingsgård (born 1944) is a Swedish social democratic politician. She was a member of the Riksdag from 2002 to 2010.
