= Tina Ehn =

Swedish politician (born 1960)

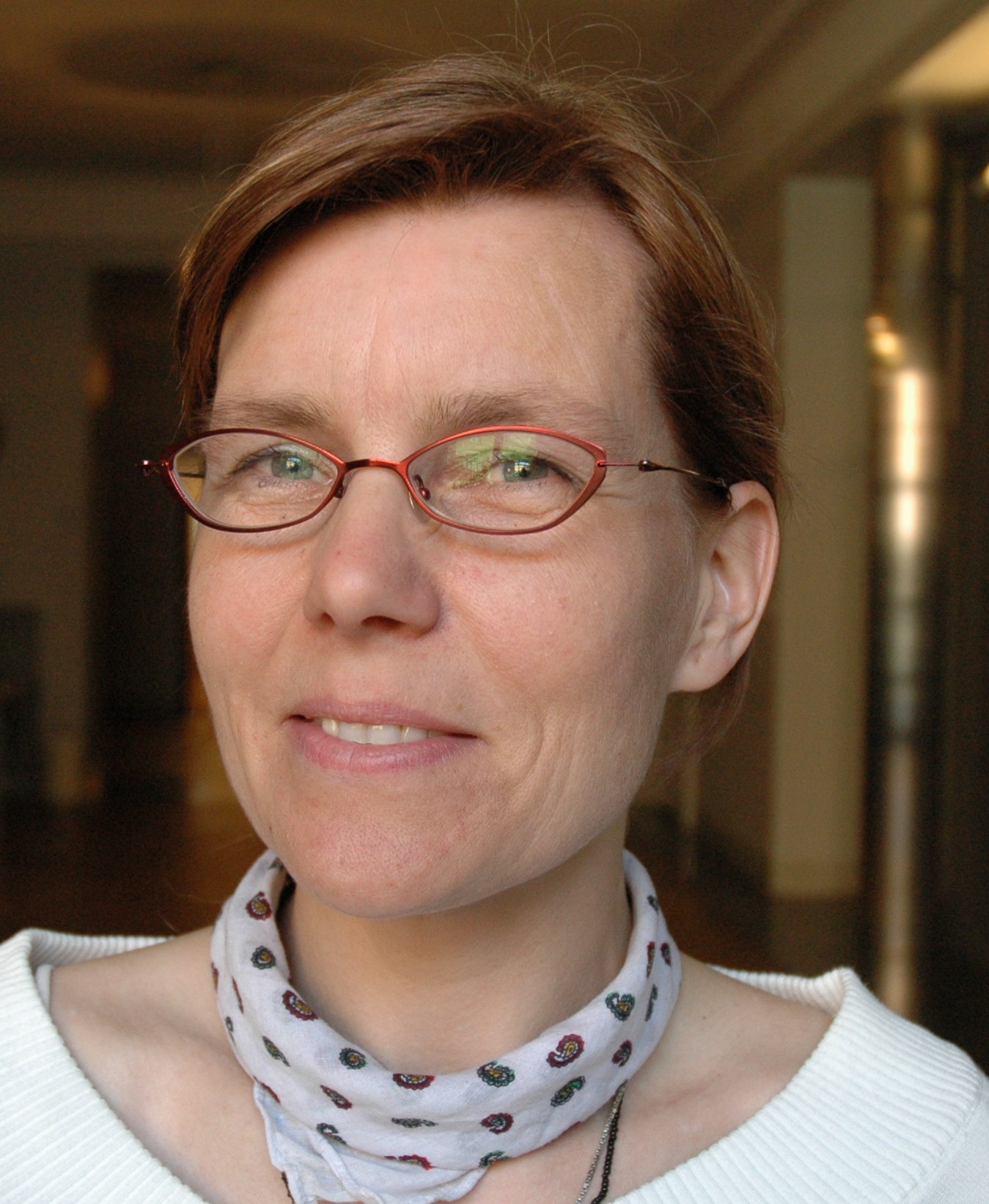
Tina Ehn

Tina Ehn (born 1960) is a Swedish Green Party politician. She has been a member of the Riksdag since 2006.
