= Hans Olsson (politician) =

Swedish politician (born 1951)

Hans Olsson (born 10 June 1951) is a Swedish politician of the Social Democratic Party. He has been a member of the Riksdag since 2006.
