= Thomas Nihlén =

Swedish politician (born 1953)

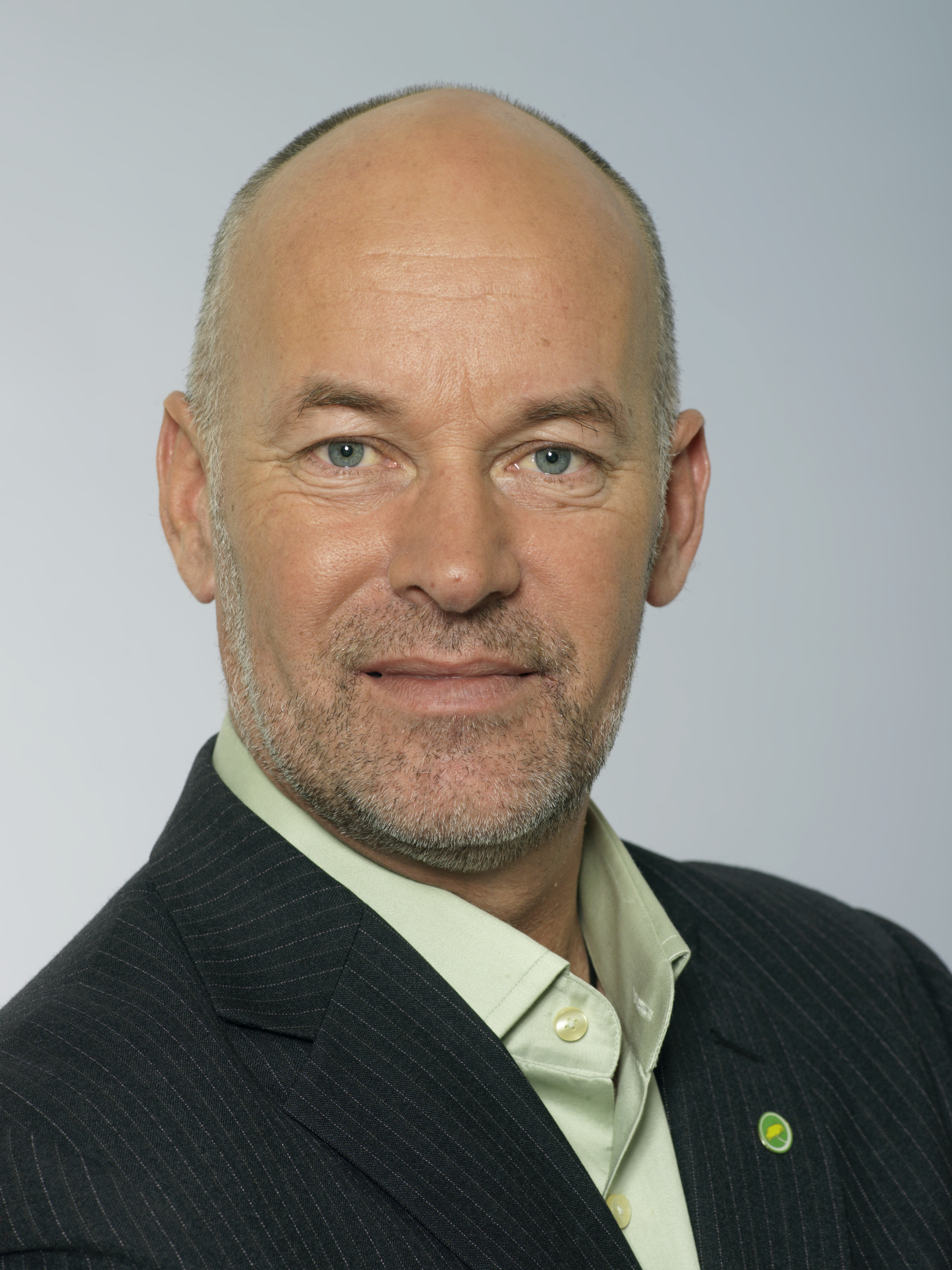
- Nihlén in October 2008

Member of the Riksdag
- In office 2 October 2006 – 4 October 2010
- Constituency: Västerbotten County

Personal details
- Born: 1953 (age 72–73)
- Party: Green Party

Thomas Hans Nihlén (born 1953) is a Swedish politician and former member of the Riksdag, the national legislature. A member of the Green Party, he represented Västerbotten County between October 2006 and October 2010. He was a member of the municipal council in Umeå Municipality.
