= Eva Selin Lindgren =

Swedish politician (1936–2011)

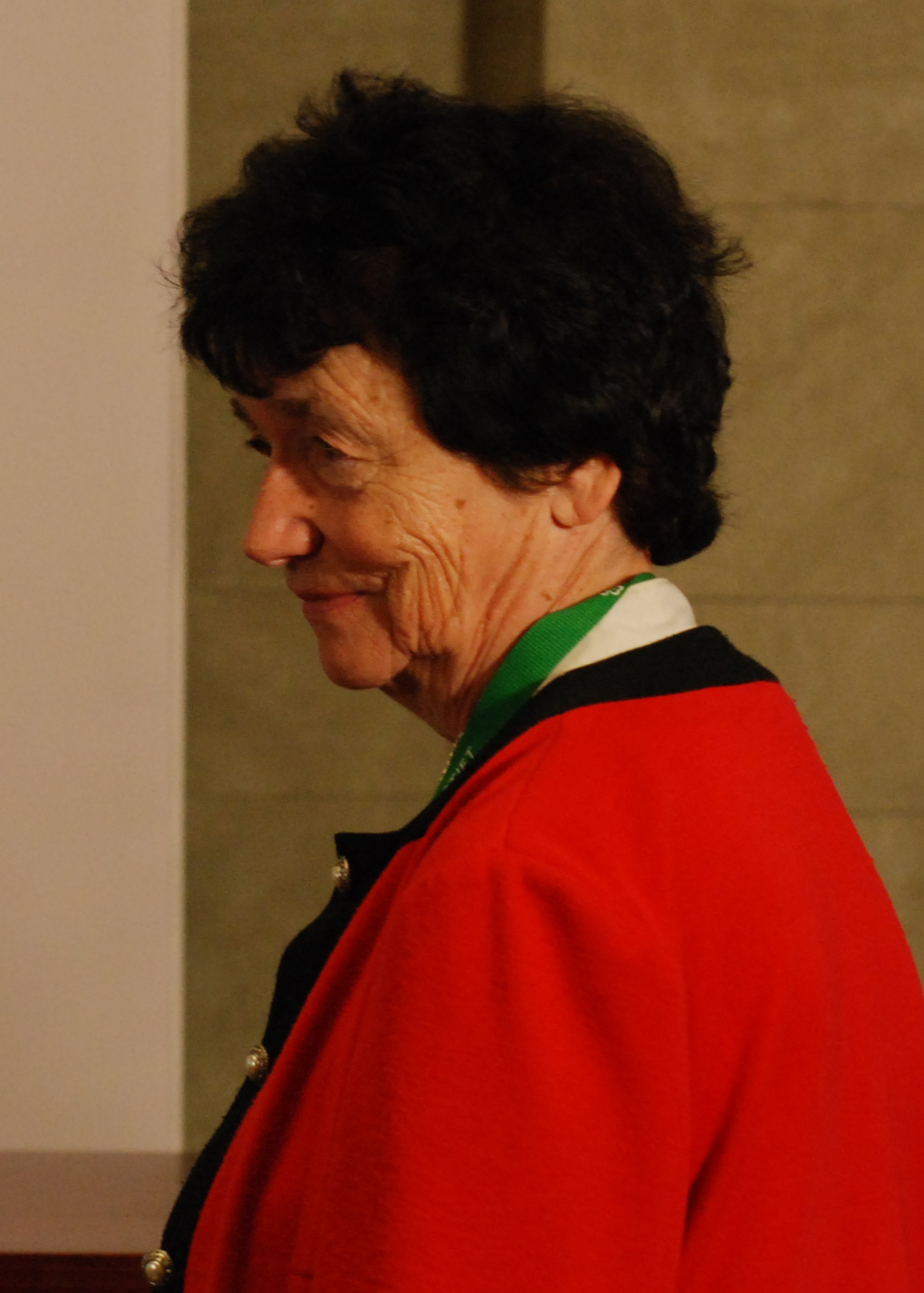
Eva Selin Lindgren

Eva Selin Lindgren (1936 – 3 September 2011) was a Swedish Centre Party politician and a professor in nuclear physics. She was a member of the Riksdag from 2006 to September 2010.
