= Agneta Berliner =

Swedish politician (born 1958)

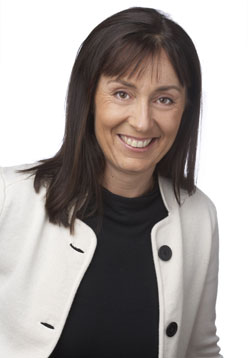
- Born: 1958 (age 67–68); Sweden
- Occupation: Politician
- Years active: 2006 to present

Agneta Berliner (born 1958) is a Swedish politician of the Liberal People's Party. She has been a member of the Riksdag since 2006.
