= Marianne Watz =

Swedish politician (born 1940)

Marianne Watz (born 1940) is a Swedish Moderate Party politician. She has been a substitute member of the Riksdag since 2006. From 2006 until 2007, Watz was the substitute for Mikael Odenberg. Currently, she is the substitute for Beatrice Ask.
