= Västra Götaland County North =

Constituency of the Riksdag

- Västra Götalands Läns Norra
- Constituency for the Riksdag
- Location of Västra Götaland County North within Sweden
- Municipality: List: Åmål; Bengtsfors; Dals-Ed; Färgelanda; Lysekil; Mellerud; Munkedal; Orust; Sotenäs; Strömstad; Tanum; Trollhättan; Uddevalla; Vänersborg
- County: Västra Götaland
- Population: 271,319 (2025)
- Electorate: 210,272 (2026)
- Area: 9,202 km^{2} (2026)

Current constituency
- Created: 1970
- Seats: List (Note: Constituency seats only.): 8 (2018–present); 9 (1970–2018)
- Member of the Riksdag: List: Ann-Sofie Alm (M); Jennie Bergius Eriksson (M); Matheus Enholm (SD); David Höglund Velasquez (V); Magnus Jacobsson (KD); Michael Melby (S); Cecilia Prins (L); Terje Skaarnes (SD); Jonathan Svensson (S); Louise Thunström (S)
- Created from: Älvsborg County North

Västra Götaland County North (Swedish: Västra Götalands Läns Norra) is one of the 29 multi-member constituencies of the Riksdag, the national legislature of Sweden. The constituency was established as Älvsborg County North (Swedish: Älvsborgs Läns Norra) in 1970 when the Riksdag was changed from a bicameral legislature to a unicameral legislature. It was renamed Västra Götaland County North in 1998 when the counties of Älvsborg, Gothenburg and Bohus and Skaraborg were merged to create Västra Götaland. The constituency currently consists of the municipalities of Åmål, Bengtsfors, Dals-Ed, Färgelanda, Lysekil, Mellerud, Munkedal, Orust, Sotenäs, Strömstad, Tanum, Trollhättan, Uddevalla and Vänersborg. The constituency currently elects eight of the 349 members of the Riksdag using the open party-list proportional representation electoral system. At the 2026 general election it had 210,272 registered electors.

== Electoral system ==
Västra Götaland County North currently elects eight of the 349 members of the Riksdag using the open party-list proportional representation electoral system. Constituency seats are allocated using the modified Sainte-Laguë method. Only parties that reach the 4% national threshold and parties that receive at least 12% of the vote in the constituency compete for constituency seats. Supplementary levelling seats may also be allocated at the constituency level to parties that reach the 4% national threshold.

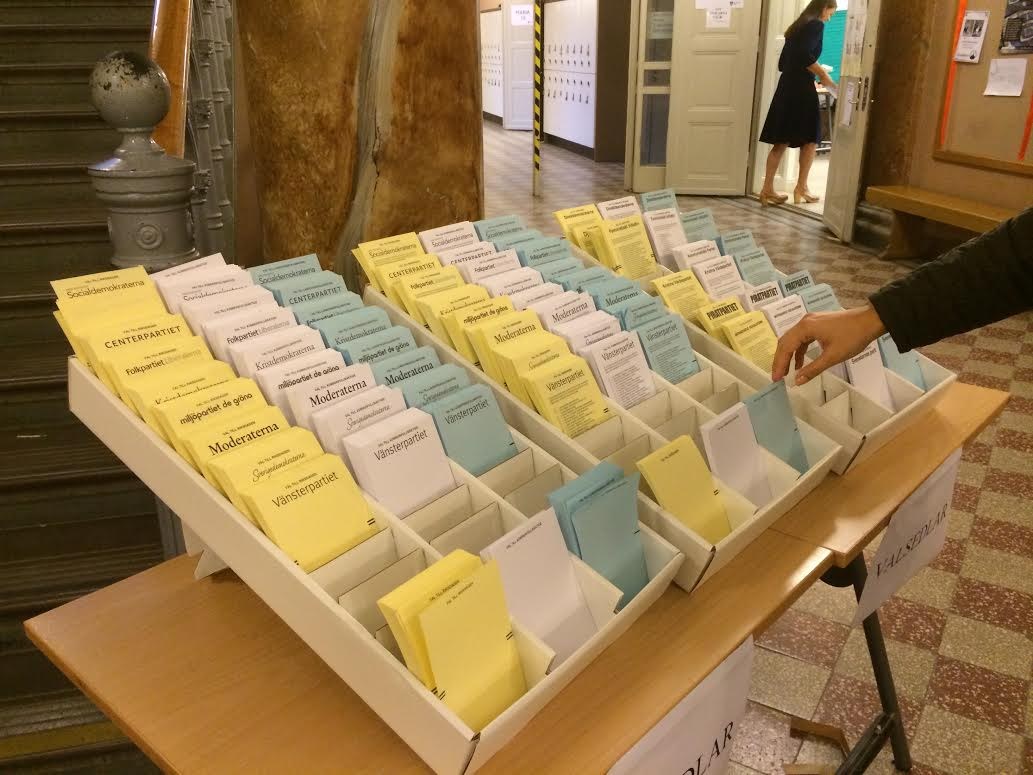
A selection of ballot papers available for voters at the 2014 general election in Stockholm - yellow for the Riksdag, blue for the regional council and white for the municipal council

Prior to 1997 voters could cast any ballot paper they wanted, though it had to contain the name of a party and the name of at least one candidate nominated by that party in the constituency. It was common for parties to hand out ballot papers with their name and list of candidates at the entrance of polling stations. Voters could delete the names of candidates or write-in the names of other candidates but in practice these options weren't used enough by voters to have any significant impact on the results and consequently elections operated as a closed system.

Since 1997, elections in Sweden follow the French model in having separate ballot papers for each party/list in a constituency. There are two ballot papers for each party - a party ballot paper (partivalsedel) with just the name of the party and a name ballot paper (namnvalsedel) with the name of the party and its list of candidates. There are also blank ballot papers (blank valsedel). Voters can initially pick as many ballot papers as they wish and then, in the secrecy of the voting booth, they select a single ballot paper of their choice. If they chose a name ballot paper they have the option of casting a preferential vote for one of their chosen party's candidates. If they chose a blank ballot paper they can write the name of any party including unregistered parties and, optionally, they can write the name of any person as their preferred candidate, even one that does not belong to their chosen party. They then place their chosen ballot paper in an envelope which is placed in the ballot box, discarding all other ballot papers they picked.

Seats won by each party/list in a constituency are allocated to its candidates in order of preference votes (a personal mandate), provided that the candidate has received at least 8% of votes cast for their party in the constituency (5% since January 2011). Any unfilled seats are then allocated to the party's remaining candidates in the order they appear on the party list (a party mandate).

== Election results ==
=== Summary ===
Election	Left V / VPK			Social Democrats S			Greens MP			Centre C			Liberals L / FP / F			Moderates M			Christian Democrats KD / KDS			Sweden Democrats SD		
Election	Votes	%	Seats	Votes	%	Seats	Votes	%	Seats	Votes	%	Seats	Votes	%	Seats	Votes	%	Seats	Votes	%	Seats	Votes	%	Seats
2026	12,524	7.10%	1	50,431	28.57%	2	7,966	4.51%	0	10,217	5.79%	0	8,677	4.92%	0	33,642	19.06%	2	12,248	6.94%	1	38,116	21.59%	2
2022	8,953	5.16%	0	54,311	31.28%	3	6,318	3.64%	0	9,938	5.72%	0	6,311	3.63%	0	30,443	17.53%	2	10,711	6.17%	1	44,165	25.43%	2
2018	11,029	6.32%	0	53,328	30.55%	3	6,349	3.64%	0	13,809	7.91%	1	8,124	4.65%	0	30,794	17.64%	2	11,347	6.50%	0	37,391	21.42%	2
2014	9,895	5.53%	0	58,289	32.55%	4	11,219	6.27%	0	12,335	6.89%	1	9,472	5.29%	0	35,979	20.09%	2	9,099	5.08%	0	27,027	15.09%	2
2010	9,907	5.73%	0	56,060	32.43%	3	12,003	6.94%	1	11,449	6.62%	1	13,393	7.75%	1	46,582	26.95%	3	11,092	6.42%	0	10,513	6.08%	0
2006	9,386	5.78%	0	62,574	38.52%	4	7,789	4.80%	0	14,471	8.91%	1	12,095	7.45%	1	34,427	21.19%	2	13,123	8.08%	1	4,532	2.79%	0
2002	13,298	8.54%	1	64,050	41.15%	4	6,687	4.30%	0	11,915	7.65%	1	19,200	12.33%	1	18,860	12.12%	1	18,203	11.69%	1	2,169	1.39%	0
1998	20,219	12.85%	1	57,002	36.24%	4	7,612	4.84%	0	10,181	6.47%	0	6,863	4.36%	0	28,117	17.88%	2	23,828	15.15%	2			
1994	10,178	6.09%	0	75,632	45.25%	5	9,562	5.72%	0	16,627	9.95%	1	11,835	7.08%	1	31,391	18.78%	2	8,715	5.21%	0			
1991	6,753	4.08%	0	59,476	35.94%	3	5,284	3.19%	0	18,242	11.02%	1	15,164	9.16%	1	31,559	19.07%	2	15,375	9.29%	1			
1988	7,840	4.88%	0	66,949	41.70%	4	10,014	6.24%	0	24,546	15.29%	2	21,045	13.11%	1	24,265	15.11%	2	5,543	3.45%	0			
1985	6,914	4.20%	0	70,275	42.66%	4	2,585	1.57%	0	27,152	16.48%	1	27,182	16.50%	2	30,319	18.41%	2	with C					
1982	6,920	4.25%	0	69,461	42.70%	4	2,554	1.57%	0	32,269	19.84%	2	12,393	7.62%	1	35,601	21.88%	2	3,309	2.03%	0			
1979	6,356	4.02%	0	63,481	40.16%	4				36,952	23.38%	2	19,338	12.23%	1	29,218	18.48%	2	2,393	1.51%	0			
1976	4,627	2.98%	0	61,029	39.29%	4				47,153	30.35%	3	19,509	12.56%	1	20,611	13.27%	1	2,248	1.45%	0			
1973	4,856	3.35%	0	58,258	40.24%	4				43,498	30.05%	3	17,115	11.82%	1	18,028	12.45%	1	2,651	1.83%	0			
1970	4,095	3.01%	0	56,206	41.30%	4				33,736	24.79%	2	25,648	18.85%	2	13,361	9.82%	1	2,881	2.12%	0			

(Excludes levelling seats. Figures in italics represent alliances/joint lists.)

=== Detailed ===
Party has received at least 4% of the vote nationally and is entitled to compete for constituency seats.

==== 2020s ====
===== 2026 =====
Results of the 2026 general election held on 13 September 2026:

Party		Votes per municipality														Total votes	%	Seats		
Party		Åmål	Bengts- fors	Dals-Ed	Färge- landa	Lysekil	Melle- rud	Munke- dal	Orust	Sotenäs	Ström- stad	Tanum	Troll- hättan	Udde- valla	Väners- borg	Total votes	%	Con.	Lev.	Tot.
Swedish Social Democratic Party	S	2,184	1,586	579	913	2,824	1,365	1,644	2,629	1,582	2,027	1,929	12,604	10,863	7,702	50,431	28.57%	2	1	3
Sweden Democrats	SD	1,856	1,483	794	1,431	1,984	1,539	1,873	2,366	1,376	1,741	1,838	6,464	7,743	5,628	38,116	21.59%	2	0	2
Moderate Party	M	1,257	891	578	641	1,770	1,182	1,146	2,168	1,652	1,414	1,978	7,511	6,723	4,731	33,642	19.06%	2	0	2
Left Party	V	632	348	84	148	543	289	290	450	224	449	359	3,580	2,984	2,144	12,524	7.10%	1	0	1
Christian Democrats	KD	522	406	330	303	571	466	541	842	550	527	681	2,096	2,600	1,813	12,248	6.94%	1	0	1
Centre Party	C	384	348	197	336	537	423	414	781	363	484	767	1,861	1,827	1,495	10,217	5.79%	0	0	0
Liberals	L	309	217	148	190	617	219	290	662	498	405	533	1,478	1,880	1,231	8,677	4.92%	0	1	1
Green Party	MP	309	240	59	87	543	189	258	698	276	341	475	1,583	1,802	1,106	7,966	4.51%	0	0	0
Örebro Party	ÖP	65	43	14	45	29	41	55	42	27	76	36	129	133	146	881	0.50%	0	0	0
Alternative for Sweden	AfS	28	28	19	33	53	35	50	48	25	22	52	155	155	126	829	0.47%	0	0	0
Ambition Sweden	AS	24	12	7	6	14	12	12	60	6	10	11	39	45	20	278	0.16%	0	0	0
Christian Values Party	KrVP	6	17	10	3	17	5	18	19	3	4	7	46	70	32	257	0.15%	0	0	0
Pirate Party	PP	5	4	1	1	4	4	4	4	2	3	3	50	18	16	119	0.07%	0	0	0
Human Rights and Democracy	MoD	4	8	1	1	2	7	2	6	0	12	6	20	11	28	108	0.06%	0	0	0
Citizens' Coalition	MED	4	3	2	1	3	0	7	2	4	7	2	13	7	6	61	0.03%	0	0	0
Communist Party of Sweden	SKP	2	0	0	3	6	0	2	2	0	2	1	8	5	4	35	0.02%	0	0	0
United Voice	ER	1	0	1	1	1	1	0	3	1	0	5	3	5	8	30	0.02%	0	0	0
Direct Democrats	DD	1	0	1	0	1	1	0	0	0	0	2	5	3	3	17	0.01%	0	0	0
RegleraAI.nu		1	0	0	0	0	0	0	0	6	0	5	0	0	1	13	0.01%	0	0	0
Nordic Resistance Movement	NMR	0	0	0	1	1	0	1	4	0	0	1	3	1	0	12	0.01%	0	0	0
Communist Party	K	0	0	0	0	1	1	0	0	0	0	1	2	1	0	6	0.00%	0	0	0
Donald Duck Party		0	0	1	0	0	0	1	0	0	2	0	1	0	1	6	0.00%	0	0	0
The Push Buttons	Kn	1	0	0	0	1	0	0	2	0	0	0	1	0	0	5	0.00%	0	0	0
For the Good of All		0	0	0	0	0	4	0	0	0	0	0	0	0	0	4	0.00%	0	0	0
Turning Point Party	PV	0	0	0	0	0	0	0	0	0	1	0	0	2	1	4	0.00%	0	0	0
Secular Humanist Party		0	0	0	0	0	0	0	3	0	0	0	0	0	0	3	0.00%	0	0	0
Unity	ENH	0	0	0	0	0	0	0	0	0	1	0	1	1	0	3	0.00%	0	0	0
Jesus		0	0	0	0	0	0	0	0	0	0	0	0	1	1	2	0.00%	0	0	0
John Party with Extra Moose		0	0	0	0	0	0	0	0	0	0	0	2	0	0	2	0.00%	0	0	0
Nuance Party	PNy	0	0	0	1	0	0	0	0	0	0	0	0	1	0	2	0.00%	0	0	0
Volt Sweden	Volt	0	0	0	0	0	0	0	0	0	0	0	1	1	0	2	0.00%	0	0	0
YN Democrats		0	0	0	0	0	0	0	0	0	0	0	0	2	0	2	0.00%	0	0	0
99 Black Balloons		0	0	0	0	0	0	0	0	0	0	0	0	0	1	1	0.00%	0	0	0
Classical Liberal Party	KLP	0	0	0	0	0	0	0	0	0	0	0	0	0	1	1	0.00%	0	0	0
Friends of Hemp		0	0	0	0	0	0	0	0	0	0	0	1	0	0	1	0.00%	0	0	0
Profit Party		0	0	0	0	0	0	0	0	0	0	1	0	0	0	1	0.00%	0	0	0
Responsible Intelligence in Politics		0	1	0	0	0	0	0	0	0	0	0	0	0	0	1	0.00%	0	0	0
Sweden in an Electoral Alliance		0	0	0	0	0	0	0	0	0	0	0	0	0	1	1	0.00%	0	0	0
Tidö		0	0	0	0	0	0	0	0	0	0	0	0	0	1	1	0.00%	0	0	0
United Sweden		0	0	0	0	0	0	0	0	0	0	0	0	1	0	1	0.00%	0	0	0
Vision Party		0	0	0	0	0	0	0	0	0	0	0	0	0	1	1	0.00%	0	0	0
Valid votes		7,595	5,635	2,826	4,145	9,522	5,783	6,608	10,791	6,595	7,528	8,693	37,657	36,885	26,248	176,511	100.00%	8	2	10
Blank votes		95	65	32	47	90	64	62	126	55	62	103	380	367	254	1,802	1.01%			
Rejected votes – unregistered parties		4	1	0	0	0	2	3	3	1	1	2	10	14	8	49	0.03%			
Rejected votes – other		7	1	1	0	11	7	2	5	8	6	6	24	30	22	130	0.07%			
Total polled		7,701	5,702	2,859	4,192	9,623	5,856	6,675	10,925	6,659	7,597	8,804	38,071	37,296	26,532	178,492	84.89%			
Registered electors		9,279	6,858	3,455	4,933	11,182	6,953	7,935	12,459	7,597	9,423	10,205	44,949	43,822	31,222	210,272				
Turnout		82.99%	83.14%	82.75%	84.98%	86.06%	84.22%	84.12%	87.69%	87.65%	80.62%	86.27%	84.70%	85.11%	84.98%	84.89%				

The following candidates were elected:

- Constituency seats (personal mandates) - David Höglund Velasquez (V), 782 votes.
- Constituency seats (party mandates) - Ann-Sofie Alm (M), 1,288 votes; Jennie Bergius Eriksson (M), 1,048 votes; Matheus Enholm (SD), 167 votes; Magnus Jacobsson (KD), 381 votes; Terje Skaarnes (SD), 83 votes; Jonathan Svensson (S), 1,313 votes; and Louise Thunström (S), 917 votes.
- Levelling seats (personal mandates) - Michael Melby (S), 405 votes; and Cecilia Prins (L), 266 votes.

===== 2022 =====
Results of the 2022 general election held on 11 September 2022:

Party		Votes per municipality														Total votes	%	Seats		
Party		Åmål	Bengts- fors	Dals-Ed	Färge- landa	Lysekil	Melle- rud	Munke- dal	Orust	Sotenäs	Ström- stad	Tanum	Troll- hättan	Udde- valla	Väners- borg	Total votes	%	Con.	Lev.	Tot.
Swedish Social Democratic Party	S	2,606	1,903	667	1,137	3,224	1,501	1,818	3,070	1,864	2,113	2,136	12,872	11,070	8,330	54,311	31.28%	3	0	3
Sweden Democrats	SD	2,228	1,735	910	1,627	2,431	1,866	2,121	2,795	1,612	1,861	2,108	7,504	8,790	6,577	44,165	25.43%	2	0	2
Moderate Party	M	1,236	833	481	552	1,566	993	1,043	1,947	1,470	1,254	1,893	6,853	6,271	4,051	30,443	17.53%	2	0	2
Christian Democrats	KD	452	380	312	279	502	391	529	703	506	470	652	1,720	2,337	1,478	10,711	6.17%	1	0	1
Centre Party	C	392	347	248	288	439	427	403	701	373	419	733	1,931	1,807	1,430	9,938	5.72%	0	0	0
Left Party	V	413	260	86	134	486	195	293	505	199	357	359	2,211	2,021	1,434	8,953	5.16%	0	0	0
Green Party	MP	246	192	46	72	420	153	160	531	216	324	396	1,263	1,435	864	6,318	3.64%	0	0	0
Liberals	L	230	141	73	117	421	134	163	472	366	349	386	1,211	1,304	944	6,311	3.63%	0	0	0
Nuance Party	PNy	33	2	1	2	18	21	13	3	6	5	2	175	332	72	685	0.39%	0	0	0
Alternative for Sweden	AfS	16	23	14	11	46	23	18	30	30	17	22	87	107	72	516	0.30%	0	0	0
Citizens' Coalition	MED	7	1	0	6	10	14	10	10	7	20	14	63	44	31	237	0.14%	0	0	0
Christian Values Party	KrVP	2	5	24	3	9	9	14	12	1	6	5	12	69	22	193	0.11%	0	0	0
Pirate Party	PP	2	2	5	7	11	9	5	8	2	13	10	48	26	21	169	0.10%	0	0	0
The Push Buttons	Kn	9	4	1	6	11	7	3	29	1	4	4	23	43	20	165	0.10%	0	0	0
Human Rights and Democracy	MoD	13	3	0	3	7	8	3	15	5	12	14	19	24	22	148	0.09%	0	0	0
Feminist Initiative	FI	5	2	2	1	4	3	6	8	2	17	7	13	21	12	103	0.06%	0	0	0
Climate Alliance	KA	2	2	0	1	4	3	2	3	1	5	3	9	8	7	50	0.03%	0	0	0
Independent Rural Party	LPo	2	0	0	9	3	1	8	0	0	7	4	2	5	7	48	0.03%	0	0	0
Nordic Resistance Movement	NMR	0	1	1	1	4	2	9	3	4	0	3	5	2	4	39	0.02%	0	0	0
Direct Democrats	DD	0	1	1	0	0	2	1	2	0	0	2	11	7	6	33	0.02%	0	0	0
Socialist Welfare Party	S-V	0	0	0	0	0	1	2	1	0	0	0	0	22	5	31	0.02%	0	0	0
Unity	ENH	1	0	0	0	3	1	0	7	2	1	4	3	4	2	28	0.02%	0	0	0
Communist Party of Sweden	SKP	0	0	1	0	2	2	1	5	1	0	1	4	0	0	17	0.01%	0	0	0
Basic Income Party	BASIP	0	2	0	0	2	0	2	0	0	0	0	1	1	1	9	0.01%	0	0	0
Classical Liberal Party	KLP	0	0	1	0	2	0	1	0	0	0	0	1	1	2	8	0.00%	0	0	0
Sweden Out of the EU/ Free Justice Party		0	0	0	0	4	0	1	0	0	2	0	0	0	0	7	0.00%	0	0	0
Donald Duck Party		0	0	1	0	0	0	0	0	0	0	1	2	0	1	5	0.00%	0	0	0
United Democratic Party		0	0	0	0	0	0	0	0	0	0	0	1	0	3	4	0.00%	0	0	0
Electoral Cooperation Party		0	0	0	0	0	0	1	0	0	0	0	1	0	0	2	0.00%	0	0	0
Hard Line Sweden		0	1	0	0	0	0	0	0	0	0	0	0	1	0	2	0.00%	0	0	0
Turning Point Party	PV	0	0	0	0	0	0	0	0	0	0	0	2	0	0	2	0.00%	0	0	0
Evil Chicken Party	OKP	0	0	0	0	0	0	0	0	0	0	0	0	1	0	1	0.00%	0	0	0
Freedom of the Family		0	0	0	0	0	0	0	0	0	0	0	0	0	1	1	0.00%	0	0	0
Peace Party		0	0	0	0	0	0	0	0	0	0	0	0	1	0	1	0.00%	0	0	0
Volt Sweden	Volt	0	0	0	0	0	0	0	0	0	0	0	0	1	0	1	0.00%	0	0	0
Valid votes		7,895	5,840	2,875	4,256	9,629	5,766	6,630	10,860	6,668	7,256	8,759	36,047	35,755	25,419	173,655	100.00%	8	0	8
Blank votes		79	61	38	39	103	72	97	109	67	102	110	368	370	268	1,883	1.07%			
Rejected votes – unregistered parties		0	2	1	0	3	1	2	2	1	2	2	4	13	9	42	0.02%			
Rejected votes – other		3	2	1	0	20	3	4	8	2	4	6	33	28	9	123	0.07%			
Total polled		7,977	5,905	2,915	4,295	9,755	5,842	6,733	10,979	6,738	7,364	8,877	36,452	36,166	25,705	175,703	84.41%			
Registered electors		9,585	7,070	3,504	5,021	11,346	6,919	8,038	12,490	7,627	9,106	10,274	43,921	43,062	30,181	208,144				
Turnout		83.22%	83.52%	83.19%	85.54%	85.98%	84.43%	83.76%	87.90%	88.34%	80.87%	86.40%	82.99%	83.99%	85.17%	84.41%				

The following candidates were elected:

- Constituency seats (party mandates) - Ann-Sofie Alm (M), 657 votes; Matheus Enholm (SD), 238 votes; Paula Holmqvist (S), 1,262 votes; Johan Hultberg (M), 1,156 votes; Magnus Jacobsson (KD), 469 votes; Louise Thunström (S), 636 votes; Markus Wiechel (SD), 0 votes; and Mats Wiking (S), 796 votes.

Permanent substitutions:

- Paula Holmqvist (S) resigned on 3 March 2024 and was replaced by Jonathan Svensson (S) on 4 March 2024.
- Johan Hultberg (M) resigned on 31 August 2025 and was replaced by Cecilia Gustafsson (M) on 1 September 2025.

==== 2010s ====
===== 2018 =====
Results of the 2018 general election held on 9 September 2018:

Party		Votes per municipality														Total votes	%	Seats		
Party		Åmål	Bengts- fors	Dals-Ed	Färge- landa	Lysekil	Melle- rud	Munke- dal	Orust	Sotenäs	Ström- stad	Tanum	Troll- hättan	Udde- valla	Väners- borg	Total votes	%	Con.	Lev.	Tot.
Swedish Social Democratic Party	S	2,762	1,910	707	1,144	3,201	1,462	1,750	2,728	1,639	1,923	1,947	13,256	10,905	7,994	53,328	30.55%	3	0	3
Sweden Democrats	SD	1,835	1,556	794	1,379	2,153	1,651	1,831	2,282	1,353	1,533	1,671	6,364	7,411	5,578	37,391	21.42%	2	0	2
Moderate Party	M	1,091	859	477	570	1,544	947	1,122	2,079	1,631	1,384	1,963	6,493	6,596	4,038	30,794	17.64%	2	0	2
Centre Party	C	596	558	372	524	698	692	614	1,089	521	616	1,064	2,238	2,373	1,854	13,809	7.91%	1	0	1
Christian Democrats	KD	466	446	305	246	543	411	480	724	535	518	572	1,857	2,547	1,697	11,347	6.50%	0	1	1
Left Party	V	533	320	88	190	652	250	416	722	313	411	433	2,538	2,430	1,733	11,029	6.32%	0	1	1
Liberals	L	269	158	85	125	537	159	208	555	352	485	471	1,822	1,769	1,129	8,124	4.65%	0	0	0
Green Party	MP	242	140	65	70	425	146	157	403	175	323	300	1,594	1,410	899	6,349	3.64%	0	0	0
Feminist Initiative	FI	31	20	6	12	20	10	26	43	16	85	49	114	144	85	661	0.38%	0	0	0
Alternative for Sweden	AfS	45	24	7	21	33	23	12	26	20	17	31	134	124	98	615	0.35%	0	0	0
Citizens' Coalition	MED	20	5	7	3	19	10	7	21	4	5	20	73	68	48	310	0.18%	0	0	0
Pirate Party	PP	4	1	2	0	14	2	3	9	17	11	3	30	30	15	141	0.08%	0	0	0
Direct Democrats	DD	5	6	4	3	4	3	5	8	4	4	8	29	23	18	124	0.07%	0	0	0
Unity	ENH	6	2	0	0	7	8	3	14	1	2	7	23	19	18	110	0.06%	0	0	0
Christian Values Party	KrVP	0	0	6	1	5	3	8	3	2	3	7	1	50	18	107	0.06%	0	0	0
Independent Rural Party	LPo	1	3	6	4	4	3	17	11	3	1	23	2	19	7	104	0.06%	0	0	0
Animal Party	DjuP	2	0	0	7	9	0	9	10	1	4	3	16	22	13	96	0.05%	0	0	0
Nordic Resistance Movement	NMR	1	2	4	1	1	3	3	7	3	0	1	14	12	10	62	0.04%	0	0	0
Classical Liberal Party	KLP	0	0	1	0	8	0	1	0	2	1	0	4	4	3	24	0.01%	0	0	0
Basic Income Party	BASIP	0	3	0	0	6	0	1	2	0	0	0	2	7	0	21	0.01%	0	0	0
Initiative	INI	0	0	0	0	0	0	0	0	0	1	0	0	3	1	5	0.00%	0	0	0
Common sense in Sweden	CSIS	0	0	0	0	0	0	0	0	0	0	0	0	0	4	4	0.00%	0	0	0
Communist Party of Sweden	SKP	0	0	0	0	0	0	0	0	0	0	1	2	0	0	3	0.00%	0	0	0
Parties not on the ballot		0	0	0	0	2	0	1	4	0	1	0	3	3	1	15	0.01%	0	0	0
Valid votes		7,909	6,013	2,936	4,300	9,885	5,783	6,674	10,740	6,592	7,328	8,574	36,609	35,969	25,261	174,573	100.00%	8	2	10
Blank votes		80	52	37	57	110	49	78	153	48	58	82	340	319	254	1,717	0.97%			
Rejected votes – unregistered parties		4	1	0	0	3	3	1	10	5	0	2	11	8	13	61	0.03%			
Rejected votes – other		1	2	1	2	2	2	3	7	0	1	1	18	15	9	64	0.04%			
Total polled		7,994	6,068	2,974	4,359	10,000	5,837	6,756	10,910	6,645	7,387	8,659	36,978	36,311	25,537	176,415	86.83%			
Registered electors		9,425	7,103	3,475	4,991	11,424	6,778	7,836	12,253	7,533	8,799	9,895	42,779	41,795	29,090	203,176				
Turnout		84.82%	85.43%	85.58%	87.34%	87.54%	86.12%	86.22%	89.04%	88.21%	83.95%	87.51%	86.44%	86.88%	87.79%	86.83%				

The following candidates were elected:

- Constituency seats (personal mandates) - Fredrik Christensson (C), 986 votes.
- Constituency seats (party mandates) - Ann-Sofie Alm (M), 782 votes; Matheus Enholm (SD), 188 votes; Jörgen Hellman (S), 916 votes; Paula Holmqvist (S), 953 votes; Johan Hultberg (M), 1,173 votes; Jimmy Ståhl (SD), 5 votes; and Mats Wiking (S), 1,148 votes.
- Levelling seats (party mandates) - Magnus Jacobsson (KD), 449 votes; and Elin Segerlind (V), 420 votes.

Permanent substitutions:

- Jörgen Hellman (S) resigned on 10 June 2022 and was replaced by Karin Engdahl (S) on 13 June 2022.

===== 2014 =====
Results of the 2014 general election held on 14 September 2014:

Party		Votes per municipality													Total votes	%	Seats		
Party		Ale	Aling- sås	Åmål	Bengts- fors	Dals-Ed	Färge- landa	Herrl- junga	Lerum	Lilla Edet	Melle- rud	Troll- hättan	Väners- borg	Vår- gårda	Total votes	%	Con.	Lev.	Tot.
Swedish Social Democratic Party	S	5,774	7,236	3,085	2,274	850	1,455	1,779	6,121	2,849	1,748	14,480	8,579	2,059	58,289	32.55%	4	0	4
Moderate Party	M	3,962	5,956	1,314	961	536	552	1,183	7,105	1,245	1,053	6,383	4,400	1,329	35,979	20.09%	2	0	2
Sweden Democrats	SD	2,902	2,846	1,341	1,166	587	1,020	1,089	3,123	1,836	1,205	4,812	3,943	1,157	27,027	15.09%	2	0	2
Centre Party	C	911	1,760	568	582	398	586	796	1,549	508	719	1,475	1,606	877	12,335	6.89%	1	0	1
Green Party	MP	1,005	2,338	392	200	77	111	269	2,196	338	190	2,190	1,531	382	11,219	6.27%	0	1	1
Left Party	V	1,124	1,576	404	225	80	144	269	1,309	519	209	2,064	1,656	316	9,895	5.53%	0	1	1
Liberal People's Party	FP	776	1,811	307	183	81	138	266	2,050	281	186	1,876	1,197	320	9,472	5.29%	0	1	1
Christian Democrats	KD	779	1,806	281	274	206	159	439	1,461	246	276	1,305	1,104	763	9,099	5.08%	0	1	1
Feminist Initiative	FI	449	768	152	140	41	49	106	818	172	88	829	489	104	4,205	2.35%	0	0	0
Pirate Party	PP	74	102	16	22	17	12	25	114	35	7	167	74	28	693	0.39%	0	0	0
Unity	ENH	21	24	14	12	3	3	6	35	12	9	49	40	2	230	0.13%	0	0	0
Party of the Swedes	SVP	10	32	8	8	3	12	9	10	9	5	20	48	2	176	0.10%	0	0	0
Christian Values Party	KrVP	16	15	2	1	8	1	13	14	10	1	11	17	8	117	0.07%	0	0	0
Independent Rural Party	LPo	4	12	4	8	4	5	1	3	6	4	5	4	4	64	0.04%	0	0	0
Animal Party	DjuP	16	6	1	1	0	0	1	3	3	0	11	14	2	58	0.03%	0	0	0
Direct Democrats	DD	7	4	1	0	0	0	2	15	0	0	4	3	2	38	0.02%	0	0	0
Classical Liberal Party	KLP	1	2	1	0	0	0	0	4	0	2	4	3	0	17	0.01%	0	0	0
Crossroads		2	2	0	0	0	0	0	4	0	0	0	0	0	8	0.00%	0	0	0
Health Party		8	0	0	0	0	0	0	0	0	0	0	0	0	8	0.00%	0	0	0
Communist Party of Sweden	SKP	0	1	0	0	0	0	0	0	4	0	1	0	0	6	0.00%	0	0	0
European Workers Party	EAP	0	1	0	0	0	0	1	0	0	0	0	1	3	6	0.00%	0	0	0
New Party		0	0	0	0	0	0	0	0	0	3	0	0	0	3	0.00%	0	0	0
Socialist Justice Party	RS	0	1	0	0	0	0	0	0	0	0	1	0	0	2	0.00%	0	0	0
Swedish Senior Citizen Interest Party	SPI	0	0	0	0	0	0	1	0	0	0	0	0	0	1	0.00%	0	0	0
Parties not on the ballot		12	17	4	1	1	1	4	19	3	4	16	16	8	106	0.06%	0	0	0
Valid votes		17,853	26,316	7,895	6,058	2,892	4,248	6,259	25,953	8,076	5,709	35,703	24,725	7,366	179,053	100.00%	9	4	13
Blank votes		239	212	97	66	36	59	80	244	95	63	320	290	65	1,866	1.03%			
Rejected votes – other		2	6	2	1	2	0	0	3	0	1	13	10	0	40	0.02%			
Total polled		18,094	26,534	7,994	6,125	2,930	4,307	6,339	26,200	8,171	5,773	36,036	25,025	7,431	180,959	86.39%			
Registered electors		20,995	30,068	9,627	7,324	3,501	5,020	7,237	29,207	9,850	6,952	42,355	28,959	8,372	209,467				
Turnout		86.18%	88.25%	83.04%	83.63%	83.69%	85.80%	87.59%	89.70%	82.95%	83.04%	85.08%	86.42%	88.76%	86.39%				

The following candidates were elected:

- Constituency seats (personal mandates) - Annika Qarlsson (C), 1,124 votes.
- Constituency seats (party mandates) - Mikael Cederbratt (M), 629 votes; Jörgen Hellman (S), 1,233 votes; Paula Holmqvist (S), 872 votes; Peter Johnsson (S), 1,433 votes; Jonas Millard SD); 0 votes; Camilla Waltersson Grönvall (M), 1,035 votes; Markus Wiechel (SD), 6 votes; and Maria Andersson Willner (S), 975 votes.
- Levelling seats (personal mandates) - Said Abdu (FP), 491 votes; Rossana Dinamarca (V), 1,354 votes; Janine Alm Ericson (MP), 624 votes; and Penilla Gunther (KD), 475 votes.

===== 2010 =====
Results of the 2010 general election held on 19 September 2010:

Party		Votes per municipality													Total votes	%	Seats		
Party		Ale	Aling- sås	Åmål	Bengts- fors	Dals-Ed	Färge- landa	Herrl- junga	Lerum	Lilla Edet	Melle- rud	Troll- hättan	Väners- borg	Vår- gårda	Total votes	%	Con.	Lev.	Tot.
Swedish Social Democratic Party	S	5,577	6,454	3,123	2,310	800	1,438	1,651	5,565	2,926	1,715	14,445	8,173	1,883	56,060	32.43%	3	0	3
Moderate Party	M	4,768	7,000	1,949	1,389	765	1,032	1,503	8,758	1,723	1,526	8,273	6,257	1,639	46,582	26.95%	3	0	3
Liberal People's Party	FP	1,094	2,506	473	314	129	206	440	2,505	460	354	2,537	1,792	583	13,393	7.75%	1	0	1
Green Party	MP	1,012	2,382	476	294	104	127	322	2,194	359	260	2,319	1,716	438	12,003	6.94%	1	0	1
Centre Party	C	839	1,551	517	652	445	628	792	1,268	503	765	1,268	1,381	840	11,449	6.62%	1	0	1
Christian Democrats	KD	976	2,194	410	351	260	220	549	1,738	295	372	1,501	1,295	931	11,092	6.42%	0	1	1
Sweden Democrats	SD	1,367	1,191	429	339	172	361	482	1,336	777	443	1,695	1,506	415	10,513	6.08%	0	1	1
Left Party	V	1,028	1,546	420	309	109	173	296	1,277	562	291	1,995	1,613	288	9,907	5.73%	0	1	1
Pirate Party	PP	139	159	28	23	15	13	23	138	66	23	205	129	39	1,000	0.58%	0	0	0
Feminist Initiative	FI	85	60	17	18	8	8	13	98	25	17	103	114	14	580	0.34%	0	0	0
Party of the Swedes	SVP	0	6	1	0	0	5	0	2	10	0	17	27	0	68	0.04%	0	0	0
Swedish Senior Citizen Interest Party	SPI	0	0	0	0	0	0	1	33	1	0	2	4	0	41	0.02%	0	0	0
National Democrats	ND	5	4	9	0	1	0	0	2	1	0	7	2	1	32	0.02%	0	0	0
Rural Democrats		0	10	5	1	2	2	0	1	1	1	2	4	2	31	0.02%	0	0	0
Classical Liberal Party	KLP	1	9	0	0	1	0	2	6	0	0	3	2	0	24	0.01%	0	0	0
Unity	ENH	1	1	1	0	0	0	2	2	1	0	2	0	0	10	0.01%	0	0	0
Spirits Party		1	1	0	1	0	0	3	0	0	1	0	0	2	9	0.01%	0	0	0
Health Care Party	Sjvåp	1	0	1	1	2	0	0	1	0	0	0	2	0	8	0.00%	0	0	0
Freedom Party		2	1	0	0	0	0	0	1	1	0	0	1	1	7	0.00%	0	0	0
Socialist Justice Party	RS	1	1	0	0	0	1	0	1	0	0	0	0	0	4	0.00%	0	0	0
European Workers Party	EAP	0	2	0	0	0	0	0	0	0	0	0	0	0	2	0.00%	0	0	0
Active Democracy		0	0	0	1	0	0	0	0	0	0	0	0	0	1	0.00%	0	0	0
Communist Party of Sweden	SKP	0	0	0	0	0	0	0	0	1	0	0	0	0	1	0.00%	0	0	0
Norrländska Coalition	NorrS	0	0	0	0	0	1	0	0	0	0	0	0	0	1	0.00%	0	0	0
Parties not on the ballot		1	12	2	2	0	2	0	4	2	1	5	10	1	42	0.02%	0	0	0
Valid votes		16,898	25,090	7,861	6,005	2,813	4,217	6,079	24,930	7,714	5,769	34,379	24,028	7,077	172,860	100.00%	9	3	12
Blank votes		239	285	102	99	48	78	98	284	91	70	423	357	87	2,261	1.29%			
Rejected votes – other		3	4	4	2	0	5	1	5	0	4	14	6	1	49	0.03%			
Total polled		17,140	25,379	7,967	6,106	2,861	4,300	6,178	25,219	7,805	5,843	34,816	24,391	7,165	175,170	85.31%			
Registered electors		20,162	29,086	9,800	7,586	3,526	5,142	7,219	28,154	9,541	7,141	41,057	28,630	8,284	205,328				
Turnout		85.01%	87.26%	81.30%	80.49%	81.14%	83.63%	85.58%	89.58%	81.80%	81.82%	84.80%	85.19%	86.49%	85.31%				

The following candidates were elected:

- Constituency seats (personal mandates) - Annika Qarlsson (C), 1,012 votes.
- Constituency seats (party mandates) - Anita Brodén (FP), 855 vites; Mikael Cederbratt (M), 1,950 votes; Jörgen Hellman (S), 567 votes; Peter Johnsson (S), 2,958 votes; Christina Oskarsson (S), 924 votes; Peter Rådberg (MP), 557 votes; Henrik Ripa (M), 1,588 votes; and Camilla Waltersson Grönvall (M), 820 votes.
- Levelling seats (personal mandates) - Rossana Dinamarca (V), 1,197 votes.
- Levelling seats (party mandates) - Erik Almqvist (SD), 20 votes; and Penilla Gunther (KD), 553 votes.

Permanent substitutions:

- Erik Almqvist (SD) resigned on 21 February 2013 and was replaced by Anna Hagwall (SD) on the same day.
- Henrik Ripa (M) resigned on 15 January 2014 and was replaced by Björn Leivik (M) on the same day.

==== 2000s ====
===== 2006 =====
Results of the 2006 general election held on 17 September 2006:

Party		Votes per municipality													Total votes	%	Seats		
Party		Ale	Aling- sås	Åmål	Bengts- fors	Dals-Ed	Färge- landa	Herrl- junga	Lerum	Lilla Edet	Melle- rud	Troll- hättan	Väners- borg	Vår- gårda	Total votes	%	Con.	Lev.	Tot.
Swedish Social Democratic Party	S	6,164	7,297	3,354	2,608	931	1,556	1,814	6,251	3,140	1,934	15,926	9,631	1,968	62,574	38.52%	4	0	4
Moderate Party	M	3,272	5,249	1,395	1,009	543	714	1,246	6,815	1,309	1,161	6,049	4,440	1,225	34,427	21.19%	2	0	2
Centre Party	C	1,071	1,869	846	878	471	764	904	1,441	671	901	1,801	1,945	909	14,471	8.91%	1	0	1
Christian Democrats	KD	1,094	2,417	485	418	331	230	622	1,999	404	532	1,762	1,722	1,107	13,123	8.08%	1	0	1
Liberal People's Party	FP	1,116	2,240	385	297	129	259	402	2,320	402	301	2,188	1,551	505	12,095	7.45%	1	0	1
Left Party	V	1,102	1,474	439	338	84	153	288	1,272	583	284	1,733	1,357	279	9,386	5.78%	0	1	1
Green Party	MP	645	1,541	318	247	77	87	188	1,450	280	177	1,373	1,095	311	7,789	4.80%	0	1	1
Sweden Democrats	SD	606	550	182	128	53	171	211	575	381	241	627	596	211	4,532	2.79%	0	0	0
June List		81	116	28	98	90	74	47	85	37	36	122	108	43	965	0.59%	0	0	0
Feminist Initiative	FI	89	148	39	33	8	17	38	159	62	30	150	128	28	929	0.57%	0	0	0
Pirate Party	PP	96	151	37	3	8	15	20	118	52	13	202	142	39	896	0.55%	0	0	0
Swedish Senior Citizen Interest Party	SPI	15	48	9	6	0	7	55	198	19	12	36	80	15	500	0.31%	0	0	0
Health Care Party	Sjvåp	28	19	32	19	16	32	4	30	25	30	76	75	14	400	0.25%	0	0	0
National Socialist Front		3	6	0	7	0	0	0	2	12	0	75	16	5	126	0.08%	0	0	0
National Democrats	ND	11	0	36	0	0	1	1	25	2	0	2	2	0	80	0.05%	0	0	0
Unity	ENH	5	9	0	2	0	0	4	5	2	1	10	5	1	44	0.03%	0	0	0
People's Will		1	1	0	0	3	1	2	1	3	2	1	17	1	33	0.02%	0	0	0
New Future	NYF	2	4	5	3	2	0	1	0	0	0	0	0	1	18	0.01%	0	0	0
Socialist Justice Party	RS	0	1	0	0	0	0	1	1	1	0	1	0	0	5	0.00%	0	0	0
Classical Liberal Party	KLP	0	0	0	0	0	0	0	0	0	0	1	3	0	4	0.00%	0	0	0
Kvinnokraft		0	0	0	0	0	0	0	1	0	1	1	0	0	3	0.00%	0	0	0
European Workers Party	EAP	0	1	0	0	0	0	1	0	0	0	0	0	0	2	0.00%	0	0	0
Unique Party		0	0	0	0	1	0	0	1	0	0	0	0	0	2	0.00%	0	0	0
Communist League	KommF	0	0	0	0	0	0	0	0	0	0	0	1	0	1	0.00%	0	0	0
Other parties		4	3	2	2	0	0	0	4	4	1	3	3	1	27	0.02%	0	0	0
Valid votes		15,405	23,144	7,592	6,096	2,747	4,081	5,849	22,753	7,389	5,657	32,139	22,917	6,663	162,432	100.00%	9	2	11
Blank votes		305	391	195	104	53	98	126	383	139	125	566	456	109	3,050	1.84%			
Rejected votes – other		7	7	2	1	1	2	2	7	5	4	16	7	5	66	0.04%			
Total polled		15,717	23,542	7,789	6,201	2,801	4,181	5,977	23,143	7,533	5,786	32,721	23,380	6,777	165,548	82.66%			
Registered electors		19,235	27,732	9,823	7,864	3,568	5,208	7,096	26,595	9,462	7,335	39,876	28,470	8,021	200,285				
Turnout		81.71%	84.89%	79.29%	78.85%	78.50%	80.28%	84.23%	87.02%	79.61%	78.88%	82.06%	82.12%	84.49%	82.66%				

The following candidates were elected:

- Constituency seats (personal mandates) - Annika Qarlsson (C), 1,404 votes.
- Constituency seats (party mandates) - Britt Bohlin Olsson (S), 2,360 votes; Anita Brodén (FP), 725 vites; Mikael Cederbratt (M), 1,970 votes; Jörgen Hellman (S), 343 votes; Peter Johnsson (S), 1,882 votes; Björn Leivik (M), 1,184 votes; Christina Nenes (S), 883 votes; and Ingemar Vänerlöv (KD), 750 votes.
- Levelling seats (personal mandates) - Rossana Dinamarca (V), 866 votes.
- Levelling seats (party mandates) - Peter Rådberg (MP), 464 votes.

Permanent substitutions:

- Britt Bohlin Olsson (S) resigned on 31 May 2008 and was replaced by Renée Jeryd (S) on 1 June 2008.

===== 2002 =====
Results of the 2002 general election held on 15 September 2002:

Party		Votes per municipality													Total votes	%	Seats		
Party		Ale	Aling- sås	Åmål	Bengts- fors	Dals-Ed	Färge- landa	Herrl- junga	Lerum	Lilla Edet	Melle- rud	Troll- hättan	Väners- borg	Vår- gårda	Total votes	%	Con.	Lev.	Tot.
Swedish Social Democratic Party	S	6,428	7,450	3,457	2,863	1,023	1,621	1,892	6,976	3,256	2,020	15,365	9,726	1,973	64,050	41.15%	4	0	4
Liberal People's Party	FP	1,771	3,323	699	559	174	440	567	3,841	690	544	3,466	2,496	630	19,200	12.33%	1	0	1
Moderate Party	M	1,620	2,839	715	551	291	374	697	3,655	731	716	3,532	2,470	669	18,860	12.12%	1	0	1
Christian Democrats	KD	1,499	3,434	750	653	464	409	991	2,567	573	757	2,363	2,270	1,473	18,203	11.69%	1	0	1
Left Party	V	1,508	1,992	514	430	115	248	382	1,803	697	358	2,721	2,133	397	13,298	8.54%	1	0	1
Centre Party	C	796	1,186	842	872	484	796	923	724	609	865	1,385	1,659	774	11,915	7.65%	1	0	1
Green Party	MP	606	1,213	298	186	99	80	201	1,060	337	174	1,215	956	262	6,687	4.30%	0	1	1
Sweden Democrats	SD	305	106	51	14	8	67	70	361	191	109	647	204	36	2,169	1.39%	0	0	0
New Future	NYF	45	51	44	33	35	15	25	28	27	29	40	116	68	556	0.36%	0	0	0
Swedish Senior Citizen Interest Party	SPI	18	27	10	16	4	3	13	138	4	66	22	37	3	361	0.23%	0	0	0
Socialist Party	SOC.P	11	1	0	1	0	2	0	4	7	0	0	1	0	27	0.02%	0	0	0
Unity	ENH	0	0	0	0	0	0	1	2	0	0	4	3	0	10	0.01%	0	0	0
European Workers Party	EAP	0	0	0	8	0	0	0	0	0	0	1	0	0	9	0.01%	0	0	0
Socialist Justice Party	RS	0	2	0	0	0	0	0	0	0	0	0	1	0	3	0.00%	0	0	0
The Communists	KOMM	0	0	0	0	0	0	0	0	2	0	0	0	0	2	0.00%	0	0	0
National Householders	Riksh	0	1	0	0	0	0	0	0	0	0	0	0	0	1	0.00%	0	0	0
Other parties		51	45	20	11	3	17	19	25	17	18	30	51	10	317	0.20%	0	0	0
Valid votes		14,658	21,670	7,400	6,197	2,700	4,072	5,781	21,184	7,141	5,656	30,791	22,123	6,295	155,668	100.00%	9	1	10
Rejected votes		234	372	166	105	46	65	114	318	121	121	496	500	98	2,756	1.74%			
Total polled		14,892	22,042	7,566	6,302	2,746	4,137	5,895	21,502	7,262	5,777	31,287	22,623	6,393	158,424	80.81%			
Registered electors		18,415	26,543	9,779	8,142	3,684	5,238	7,128	25,369	9,346	7,424	39,036	28,151	7,795	196,050				
Turnout		80.87%	83.04%	77.37%	77.40%	74.54%	78.98%	82.70%	84.76%	77.70%	77.82%	80.15%	80.36%	82.01%	80.81%				

The following candidates were elected:

- Constituency seats (personal mandates) - Anita Brodén (FP), 1,685 vites; Elizabeth Nyström (M), 1,948 votes; Annika Qarlsson (C), 1,348 votes; and Rossana Valeria Dinamarca (V), 1,773 votes.
- Constituency seats (party mandates) - Britt Bohlin (S), 4,339 votes; Peter Johnsson (S), 2,177 votes; Christina Nenes (S), 1,198 votes; Nils-Erik Söderqvist (S), 885 votes; and Ingemar Vänerlöv (KD), 320 votes.
- Levelling seats (party mandates) - Barbro Feltzing (MP), 477 votes.

==== 1990s ====
===== 1998 =====
Results of the 1998 general election held on 20 September 1998:

Party		Votes per municipality													Total votes	%	Seats		
Party		Ale	Aling- sås	Åmål	Bengts- fors	Dals-Ed	Färge- landa	Herrl- junga	Lerum	Lilla Edet	Melle- rud	Troll- hättan	Väners- borg	Vår- gårda	Total votes	%	Con.	Lev.	Tot.
Swedish Social Democratic Party	S	5,801	6,634	3,236	2,747	893	1,562	1,680	5,948	2,950	1,842	13,702	8,280	1,727	57,002	36.24%	4	0	4
Moderate Party	M	2,444	4,208	1,246	1,062	454	594	955	5,287	961	1,065	5,159	3,730	952	28,117	17.88%	2	0	2
Christian Democrats	KD	1,941	3,924	1,034	931	594	558	1,152	3,661	821	956	3,420	3,259	1,577	23,828	15.15%	2	0	2
Left Party	V	2,322	2,828	951	696	243	407	551	2,596	1,218	576	4,146	3,032	653	20,219	12.85%	1	0	1
Centre Party	C	721	993	588	628	442	734	792	609	567	805	1,095	1,493	714	10,181	6.47%	0	1	1
Green Party	MP	649	1,274	344	254	144	122	266	1,167	323	321	1,369	1,038	341	7,612	4.84%	0	1	1
Liberal People's Party	FP	494	1,257	257	233	90	165	305	1,240	220	193	1,232	895	282	6,863	4.36%	0	1	1
Other parties		230	403	132	73	53	85	127	463	201	217	918	471	97	3,470	2.21%	0	0	0
Valid votes		14,602	21,521	7,788	6,624	2,913	4,227	5,828	20,971	7,261	5,975	31,041	22,198	6,343	157,292	100.00%	9	3	12
Rejected votes		402	432	166	143	86	100	118	452	109	145	619	487	101	3,360	2.09%			
Total polled		15,004	21,953	7,954	6,767	2,999	4,327	5,946	21,423	7,370	6,120	31,660	22,685	6,444	160,652	82.60%			
Registered electors		18,132	25,948	10,047	8,553	3,796	5,349	7,099	24,909	9,181	7,681	38,406	27,593	7,790	194,484				
Turnout		82.75%	84.60%	79.17%	79.12%	79.00%	80.89%	83.76%	86.01%	80.27%	79.68%	82.44%	82.21%	82.72%	82.60%				

The following candidates were elected:

- Constituency seats (personal mandates) - Elizabeth Nyström (M), 2,598 votes.
- Constituency seats (party mandates) - Britt Bohlin (S), 2,525 votes; Ingvar Johnsson (S), 2,590 votes; Björn Leivik (M), 2,010 votes; Christina Nenes (S), 1,629 votes; Fanny Rizell (KD), 292 votes; Stig Sandström (V), 579 votes; Nils-Erik Söderqvist (S), 1,244 votes; and Ingemar Vänerlöv (KD), 364 votes.
- Levelling seats (personal mandates) - Marianne Andersson (C), 1,421 votes; and Elver Jonsson (FP), 828 votes.
- Levelling seats (party mandates) - Barbro Johansson (MP), 396 votes.

===== 1994 =====
Results of the 1994 general election held on 18 September 1994:

Party		Votes per municipality													Total votes	%	Seats		
Party		Ale	Aling- sås	Åmål	Bengts- fors	Dals-Ed	Färge- landa	Herrl- junga	Lerum	Lilla Edet	Melle- rud	Troll- hättan	Väners- borg	Vår- gårda	Total votes	%	Con.	Lev.	Tot.
Swedish Social Democratic Party	S	7,824	9,079	4,394	3,488	1,162	2,002	2,211	7,931	4,066	2,472	17,795	10,961	2,247	75,632	45.25%	5	0	5
Moderate Party	M	2,693	4,530	1,559	1,218	546	733	1,196	5,805	1,050	1,243	5,441	4,260	1,117	31,391	18.78%	2	0	2
Centre Party	C	1,198	1,744	943	1,008	647	1,026	1,250	1,158	877	1,399	1,885	2,411	1,081	16,627	9.95%	1	0	1
Liberal People's Party	FP	978	1,971	454	403	154	266	388	2,219	318	301	2,243	1,667	473	11,835	7.08%	1	0	1
Left Party	V	1,221	1,423	415	339	118	195	290	1,254	664	263	2,119	1,584	293	10,178	6.09%	0	1	1
Green Party	MP	761	1,539	368	315	247	219	370	1,482	362	455	1,604	1,391	449	9,562	5.72%	0	1	1
Christian Democratic Unity	KDS	636	1,715	329	388	284	163	496	1,189	259	348	1,009	1,055	844	8,715	5.21%	0	1	1
New Democracy	NyD	251	284	74	64	24	52	76	348	102	117	321	288	77	2,078	1.24%	0	0	0
Other parties		133	140	35	20	21	16	25	116	110	43	309	135	34	1,137	0.68%	0	0	0
Valid votes		15,695	22,425	8,571	7,243	3,203	4,672	6,302	21,502	7,808	6,641	32,726	23,752	6,615	167,155	100.00%	9	3	12
Rejected votes		265	316	117	107	51	89	123	352	107	103	429	363	89	2,511	1.48%			
Total polled		15,960	22,741	8,688	7,350	3,254	4,761	6,425	21,854	7,915	6,744	33,155	24,115	6,704	169,666	87.79%			
Registered electors		17,972	25,471	10,265	8,717	3,913	5,478	7,197	24,076	9,108	7,905	37,693	27,820	7,652	193,267				
Turnout		88.80%	89.28%	84.64%	84.32%	83.16%	86.91%	89.27%	90.77%	86.90%	85.31%	87.96%	86.68%	87.61%	87.79%				

The following candidates were elected: Arne Andersson (M); Marianne Andersson (C); Stig Bertilsson (M); Britt Bohlin (S); Rune Evensson (S); Barbro Johansson (MP); Ingvar Johnsson (S); Elver Jonsson (FP); Lena Klevenås (S); Fanny Rizell (KDS); Stig Sandström (V); and Nils-Erik Söderqvist (S).

Permanent substitutions:

- Stig Bertilsson (M) was removed from office on 14 October 1996 after being convicted of fraud and was replaced by Elizabeth Nyström (M) on 16 October 1996.

===== 1991 =====
Results of the 1991 general election held on 15 September 1991:

Party		Votes per municipality													Total votes	%	Seats		
Party		Ale	Aling- sås	Åmål	Bengts- fors	Dals-Ed	Färge- landa	Herrl- junga	Lerum	Lilla Edet	Melle- rud	Troll- hättan	Väners- borg	Vår- gårda	Total votes	%	Con.	Lev.	Tot.
Swedish Social Democratic Party	S	5,906	7,219	3,727	2,956	828	1,610	1,696	5,599	3,172	1,988	14,534	8,624	1,617	59,476	35.94%	3	1	4
Moderate Party	M	2,815	4,340	1,525	1,120	522	715	1,164	5,749	1,096	1,194	5,700	4,431	1,188	31,559	19.07%	2	0	2
Centre Party	C	1,280	1,878	1,063	1,211	821	1,041	1,260	1,212	1,004	1,525	2,134	2,711	1,102	18,242	11.02%	1	0	1
Christian Democratic Unity	KDS	1,116	2,726	695	770	483	362	877	2,042	505	687	1,859	2,020	1,233	15,375	9.29%	1	0	1
Liberal People's Party	FP	1,313	2,423	638	482	197	321	446	2,760	515	392	2,940	2,200	537	15,164	9.16%	1	0	1
New Democracy	NyD	1,285	1,541	600	550	267	462	483	1,736	699	629	2,321	1,977	506	13,056	7.89%	1	0	1
Left Party	V	817	961	260	248	65	109	186	860	404	148	1,452	1,064	179	6,753	4.08%	0	0	0
Green Party	MP	431	871	175	173	109	108	176	943	196	209	908	787	198	5,284	3.19%	0	0	0
Other parties		39	67	26	20	19	18	16	80	35	11	173	65	23	592	0.36%	0	0	0
Valid votes		15,002	22,026	8,709	7,530	3,311	4,746	6,304	20,981	7,626	6,783	32,021	23,879	6,583	165,501	100.00%	9	1	10
Rejected votes		305	369	155	110	33	78	105	386	117	107	583	432	89	2,869	1.70%			
Total polled		15,307	22,395	8,864	7,640	3,344	4,824	6,409	21,367	7,743	6,890	32,604	24,311	6,672	168,370	87.86%			
Registered electors		17,195	24,978	10,413	8,993	3,974	5,556	7,151	23,445	8,989	7,965	37,442	28,065	7,467	191,633				
Turnout		89.02%	89.66%	85.12%	84.95%	84.15%	86.83%	89.62%	91.14%	86.14%	86.50%	87.08%	86.62%	89.35%	87.86%				

The following candidates were elected: Arne Andersson (M); Marianne Andersson (C); Stig Bertilsson (M); Britt Bohlin (S); Rune Evensson (S); Ingvar Johnsson (S); Elver Jonsson (FP); Lena Klevenås (S); Fanny Rizell (KDS); and Laila Strid-Jansson (NyD).

==== 1980s ====
===== 1988 =====
Results of the 1988 general election held on 18 September 1988:

Party		Votes per municipality													Total votes	%	Seats		
Party		Ale	Aling- sås	Åmål	Bengts- fors	Dals-Ed	Färge- landa	Herrl- junga	Lerum	Lilla Edet	Melle- rud	Troll- hättan	Väners- borg	Vår- gårda	Total votes	%	Con.	Lev.	Tot.
Swedish Social Democratic Party	S	6,628	7,857	4,115	3,414	966	1,809	1,906	6,340	3,562	2,319	16,585	9,710	1,738	66,949	41.70%	4	0	4
Centre Party	C	1,811	2,589	1,478	1,617	1,036	1,405	1,756	1,894	1,188	1,893	2,861	3,443	1,575	24,546	15.29%	2	0	2
Moderate Party	M	1,842	3,461	1,255	870	407	582	1,028	4,198	782	1,012	4,110	3,665	1,053	24,265	15.11%	2	0	2
Liberal People's Party	FP	1,722	3,340	822	745	337	424	702	4,003	690	629	3,761	3,009	861	21,045	13.11%	1	1	2
Green Party	MP	891	1,386	371	389	226	260	357	1,568	448	419	1,818	1,545	336	10,014	6.24%	0	1	1
Left Party – Communists	VPK	867	1,065	344	289	76	103	210	1,034	456	142	1,817	1,266	171	7,840	4.88%	0	0	0
Christian Democratic Unity	KDS	418	1,087	221	264	167	103	304	609	199	287	712	683	489	5,543	3.45%	0	0	0
Other parties		87	48	0	5	7	2	6	42	19	15	52	36	24	343	0.21%	0	0	0
Valid votes		14,266	20,833	8,606	7,593	3,222	4,688	6,269	19,688	7,344	6,716	31,716	23,357	6,247	160,545	100.00%	9	2	11
Rejected votes		179	227	88	75	29	63	58	282	78	64	358	300	54	1,855	1.14%			
Total polled		14,445	21,060	8,694	7,668	3,251	4,751	6,327	19,970	7,422	6,780	32,074	23,657	6,301	162,400	86.66%			
Registered electors		16,522	23,901	10,328	9,036	3,949	5,509	7,091	22,307	8,663	8,014	37,313	27,669	7,103	187,405				
Turnout		87.43%	88.11%	84.18%	84.86%	82.32%	86.24%	89.23%	89.52%	85.67%	84.60%	85.96%	85.50%	88.71%	86.66%				

The following candidates were elected: Arne Andersson (M); Marianne Andersson (C); Stig Bertilsson (M); Britt Bohlin (S); Anders Castberger (FP); Rune Evensson (S); Rune Johansson (S); Ingvar Johnsson (S); Elver Jonsson (FP); Ingvar Karlsson (C); and Marianne Samuelsson (MP).

===== 1985 =====
Results of the 1985 general election held on 15 September 1985:

Party		Votes per municipality													Total votes	%	Seats		
Party		Ale	Aling- sås	Åmål	Bengts- fors	Dals-Ed	Färge- landa	Herrl- junga	Lerum	Lilla Edet	Melle- rud	Troll- hättan	Väners- borg	Vår- gårda	Total votes	%	Con.	Lev.	Tot.
Swedish Social Democratic Party	S	6,947	8,159	4,280	3,685	970	1,835	1,900	6,590	3,781	2,431	17,373	10,595	1,729	70,275	42.66%	4	0	4
Moderate Party	M	2,309	4,063	1,709	1,190	586	792	1,307	4,919	1,030	1,454	5,081	4,631	1,248	30,319	18.41%	2	0	2
Liberal People's Party	FP	2,267	4,428	1,199	1,004	479	549	1,015	4,890	902	804	4,581	3,888	1,176	27,182	16.50%	2	0	2
Centre Party	C	2,028	3,033	1,525	1,933	1,234	1,526	1,918	1,846	1,210	2,198	3,096	3,749	1,856	27,152	16.48%	1	1	2
Left Party – Communists	VPK	775	1,050	288	227	72	88	176	895	368	164	1,595	1,075	141	6,914	4.20%	0	0	0
Green Party	MP	185	313	96	114	64	68	76	421	130	118	550	334	116	2,585	1.57%	0	0	0
Other parties		21	32	7	14	8	7	13	54	15	6	47	64	7	295	0.18%	0	0	0
Valid votes		14,532	21,078	9,104	8,167	3,413	4,865	6,405	19,615	7,436	7,175	32,323	24,336	6,273	164,722	100.00%	9	1	10
Rejected votes		135	167	58	59	19	38	58	177	49	50	223	196	51	1,280	0.77%			
Total polled		14,667	21,245	9,162	8,226	3,432	4,903	6,463	19,792	7,485	7,225	32,546	24,532	6,324	166,002	90.53%			
Registered electors		15,966	23,132	10,430	9,184	3,962	5,465	6,993	21,300	8,353	8,102	36,322	27,281	6,872	183,362				
Turnout		91.86%	91.84%	87.84%	89.57%	86.62%	89.72%	92.42%	92.92%	89.61%	89.18%	89.60%	89.92%	92.03%	90.53%				

The following candidates were elected: Arne Andersson (M); Marianne Andersson (C); Rune Evensson (S); Kerstin Gellerman (FP); Rune Johansson (S); Ingvar Johnsson (S); Elver Jonsson (FP); Ingvar Karlsson (C); Sten Sture Paterson (M); and Wivi-Anne Radesjö (S).

Permanent substitutions:

- Kerstin Gellerman (FP) died on 10 August 1987 and was replaced by Anders Castberger (FP) on 11 August 1987.
- Sten Sture Paterson (M) resigned on 5 October 1987 and was replaced by Stig Bertilsson (M) on 6 October 1987.

===== 1982 =====
Results of the 1982 general election held on 19 September 1982:

Party		Votes per municipality													Total votes	%	Seats		
Party		Ale	Aling- sås	Åmål	Bengts- fors	Dals-Ed	Färge- landa	Herrl- junga	Lerum	Lilla Edet	Melle- rud	Troll- hättan	Väners- borg	Vår- gårda	Total votes	%	Con.	Lev.	Tot.
Swedish Social Democratic Party	S	6,790	7,737	4,495	3,728	992	1,839	1,906	6,193	3,757	2,490	17,375	10,524	1,635	69,461	42.70%	4	1	5
Moderate Party	M	2,770	4,953	1,967	1,310	635	897	1,584	6,257	1,210	1,589	5,832	5,085	1,512	35,601	21.88%	2	0	2
Centre Party	C	2,426	3,505	1,786	2,237	1,390	1,859	1,976	2,566	1,434	2,532	3,916	4,802	1,840	32,269	19.84%	2	0	2
Liberal People's Party	FP	895	2,145	495	531	198	197	560	1,965	377	377	2,338	1,635	680	12,393	7.62%	1	0	1
Left Party – Communists	VPK	792	992	226	237	53	91	164	1,002	335	130	1,629	1,118	151	6,920	4.25%	0	0	0
Christian Democratic Unity	KDS	254	588	206	209	118	46	142	390	98	194	418	383	263	3,309	2.03%	0	0	0
Green Party	MP	173	376	95	113	65	47	78	445	116	111	455	384	96	2,554	1.57%	0	0	0
K-Party	K-P	0	1	1	1	0	0	0	3	3	0	4	2	0	15	0.01%	0	0	0
Other parties		23	15	6	5	2	1	9	28	5	2	24	34	5	159	0.10%	0	0	0
Valid votes		14,123	20,312	9,277	8,371	3,453	4,977	6,419	18,849	7,335	7,425	31,991	23,967	6,182	162,681	100.00%	9	1	10
Rejected votes		116	159	69	42	11	37	42	156	52	39	233	180	35	1,171	0.71%			
Total polled		14,239	20,471	9,346	8,413	3,464	5,014	6,461	19,005	7,387	7,464	32,224	24,147	6,217	163,852	92.08%			
Registered electors		15,268	22,091	10,409	9,279	3,870	5,435	6,927	20,174	8,079	8,176	35,153	26,366	6,717	177,944				
Turnout		93.26%	92.67%	89.79%	90.67%	89.51%	92.25%	93.27%	94.21%	91.43%	91.29%	91.67%	91.58%	92.56%	92.08%				

The following candidates were elected: Arne Andersson (M); Kerstin Andersson (C); Rune Evensson (S); Rune Johansson (S); Ingvar Johnsson (S); Elver Jonsson (FP); Ingvar Karlsson (C); Lars-Åke Larsson (S); Sten Sture Paterson (M); and Wivi-Anne Radesjö (S).

==== 1970s ====
===== 1979 =====
Results of the 1979 general election held on 16 September 1979:

Party		Votes per municipality													Total votes	%	Seats		
Party		Ale	Aling- sås	Åmål	Bengts- fors	Dals-Ed	Färge- landa	Herrl- junga	Lerum	Lilla Edet	Melle- rud	Troll- hättan	Väners- borg	Vår- gårda	Total votes	%	Con.	Lev.	Tot.
Swedish Social Democratic Party	S	6,048	6,869	4,176	3,594	918	1,661	1,647	5,344	3,419	2,319	16,239	9,806	1,441	63,481	40.16%	4	0	4
Centre Party	C	2,851	3,951	2,136	2,504	1,587	1,996	2,224	3,157	1,689	2,803	4,644	5,369	2,041	36,952	23.38%	2	0	2
Moderate Party	M	2,054	3,959	1,707	1,179	504	767	1,384	5,097	942	1,392	4,681	4,248	1,304	29,218	18.48%	2	0	2
Liberal People's Party	FP	1,524	3,168	814	694	298	313	776	3,148	626	542	3,826	2,717	892	19,338	12.23%	1	0	1
Left Party – Communists	VPK	696	788	222	221	61	94	147	881	304	132	1,576	1,099	135	6,356	4.02%	0	0	0
Christian Democratic Unity	KDS	211	422	150	164	104	23	109	176	66	176	350	264	178	2,393	1.51%	0	0	0
Communist Party of Sweden	SKP	1	15	6	4	0	2	0	4	0	0	35	8	0	75	0.05%	0	0	0
Workers' Party – The Communists	APK	6	0	0	0	0	0	0	0	6	0	9	3	0	24	0.02%	0	0	0
Other parties		10	36	7	15	10	5	9	31	13	14	49	35	2	236	0.15%	0	0	0
Valid votes		13,401	19,208	9,218	8,375	3,482	4,861	6,296	17,838	7,065	7,378	31,409	23,549	5,993	158,073	100.00%	9	0	9
Rejected votes		61	128	34	17	8	22	27	110	28	30	125	115	21	726	0.46%			
Total polled		13,462	19,336	9,252	8,392	3,490	4,883	6,323	17,948	7,093	7,408	31,534	23,664	6,014	158,799	91.45%			
Registered electors		14,526	21,082	10,392	9,287	3,855	5,310	6,812	19,158	7,756	8,126	34,846	25,970	6,518	173,638				
Turnout		92.68%	91.72%	89.03%	90.36%	90.53%	91.96%	92.82%	93.68%	91.45%	91.16%	90.50%	91.12%	92.27%	91.45%				

The following candidates were elected: Arne Andersson (M); Kerstin Andersson (C); Olle Eriksson (C); Hilding Johansson (S); Rune Johansson (S); Elver Jonsson (FP); Lars-Åke Larsson (S); Sten Sture Paterson (M); and Wivi-Anne Radesjö (S).

===== 1976 =====
Results of the 1976 general election held on 19 September 1976:

Party		Votes per municipality													Total votes	%	Seats		
Party		Ale	Aling- sås	Åmål	Bengts- fors	Dals-Ed	Färge- landa	Herrl- junga	Lerum	Lilla Edet	Melle- rud	Troll- hättan	Väners- borg	Vår- gårda	Total votes	%	Con.	Lev.	Tot.
Swedish Social Democratic Party	S	5,728	6,471	4,029	3,612	833	1,487	1,533	5,128	3,270	2,231	15,968	9,434	1,305	61,029	39.29%	4	0	4
Centre Party	C	3,657	5,380	2,728	2,974	1,819	2,216	2,560	4,534	2,045	3,273	6,703	6,915	2,349	47,153	30.35%	3	0	3
Moderate Party	M	1,275	2,800	1,273	804	384	587	1,216	3,293	607	1,090	3,112	3,138	1,032	20,611	13.27%	1	0	1
People's Party	F	1,476	3,061	837	762	282	262	759	3,239	579	546	4,001	2,828	877	19,509	12.56%	1	0	1
Left Party – Communists	VPK	529	529	167	172	48	65	100	707	216	102	1,222	703	67	4,627	2.98%	0	0	0
Christian Democratic Unity	KDS	199	381	117	160	106	38	82	176	67	166	347	305	104	2,248	1.45%	0	0	0
Communist Party of Sweden	SKP	4	8	14	11	1	2	0	15	3	0	44	27	0	129	0.08%	0	0	0
Other parties		1	2	0	1	0	0	0	9	7	0	12	5	0	37	0.02%	0	0	0
Valid votes		12,869	18,632	9,165	8,496	3,473	4,657	6,250	17,101	6,794	7,408	31,409	23,355	5,734	155,343	100.00%	9	0	9
Rejected votes		34	106	15	18	3	19	16	71	21	18	92	50	9	472	0.30%			
Total polled		12,903	18,738	9,180	8,514	3,476	4,676	6,266	17,172	6,815	7,426	31,501	23,405	5,743	155,815	92.26%			
Registered electors		13,832	20,302	10,110	9,292	3,846	5,082	6,663	18,120	7,387	8,004	34,559	25,502	6,190	168,889				
Turnout		93.28%	92.30%	90.80%	91.63%	90.38%	92.01%	94.04%	94.77%	92.26%	92.78%	91.15%	91.78%	92.78%	92.26%				

The following candidates were elected: Arne Andersson (M); Kerstin Andersson (C); Olle Eriksson (C); Hilding Johansson (S); Rune Johansson (S); Elver Jonsson (F); Lars-Åke Larsson (S); Wivi-Anne Radesjö (S); and Gunde Raneskog (C).

===== 1973 =====
Results of the 1973 general election held on 16 September 1973:

Party		Votes per municipality													Total votes	%	Seats		
Party		Ale	Aling- sås	Åmål	Bengts- fors	Dals-Ed	Färge- landa	Herrl- junga	Lerum	Lilla Edet	Melle- rud	Troll- hättan	Väners- borg	Vår- gårda	Total votes	%	Con.	Lev.	Tot.
Swedish Social Democratic Party	S	5,223	6,223	3,990	3,680	837	1,406	1,552	4,680	3,021	2,288	15,221	8,949	1,188	58,258	40.24%	4	0	4
Centre Party	C	3,059	4,705	2,627	2,833	1,666	2,078	2,423	3,925	1,814	3,231	6,570	6,415	2,152	43,498	30.05%	3	0	3
Moderate Party	M	966	2,356	1,030	666	339	559	1,097	2,966	481	855	2,953	2,920	840	18,028	12.45%	1	0	1
People's Party	F	1,184	2,809	793	716	279	261	755	2,798	491	479	3,109	2,524	917	17,115	11.82%	1	0	1
Left Party – Communists	VPK	579	537	176	167	43	50	83	603	220	117	1,495	735	51	4,856	3.35%	0	0	0
Christian Democratic Unity	KDS	220	506	136	199	125	23	89	235	64	198	384	351	121	2,651	1.83%	0	0	0
Communist League Marxist–Leninists (the revolutionaries)	KFML(r)	15	68	3	5	0	2	11	71	8	3	44	15	3	248	0.17%	0	0	0
Communist Party of Sweden	SKP	2	9	18	1	0	2	1	5	3	1	29	25	1	97	0.07%	0	0	0
Other parties		1	4	0	0	1	0	1	12	0	2	1	1	1	24	0.02%	0	0	0
Valid votes		11,249	17,217	8,773	8,267	3,290	4,381	6,012	15,295	6,102	7,174	29,806	21,935	5,274	144,775	100.00%	9	0	9
Rejected votes		16	15	8	7	4	4	3	20	11	7	35	23	4	157	0.11%			
Total polled		11,265	17,232	8,781	8,274	3,294	4,385	6,015	15,315	6,113	7,181	29,841	21,958	5,278	144,932	91.22%			
Registered electors		12,217	18,935	9,756	9,156	3,694	4,832	6,449	16,354	6,719	7,784	33,103	24,208	5,669	158,876				
Turnout		92.21%	91.01%	90.01%	90.37%	89.17%	90.75%	93.27%	93.65%	90.98%	92.25%	90.15%	90.71%	93.10%	91.22%				

The following candidates were elected: Arne Andersson (M); Kerstin Andersson (C); Olle Eriksson (C); Hilding Johansson (S); Rune Johansson (S); Elver Jonsson (F); Lars-Åke Larsson (S); Wivi-Anne Radesjö (S); and Gunde Raneskog (C).

===== 1970 =====
Results of the 1970 general election held on 20 September 1970:

Party		Votes per municipality																							Total votes	%	Seats		
Party		Aling- sås	Åmål	Bengts- fors	Bjärke	Brå- landa	Dals-Ed	Färge- landa	Frände- fors	Gäsene	Hemsjö	Herrl- junga	Hög- säter	Lerum	Lilla Edet	Melle- rud	Nödinge	Skepp- landa	Starr- kärr	Troll- hättan	Väners- borg	Vår- gårda	Västra Tunhem	Postal votes	Total votes	%	Con.	Lev.	Tot.
Swedish Social Democratic Party	S	5,005	3,544	3,369	573	274	773	998	255	585	346	874	185	3,578	2,745	2,180	2,327	352	1,589	13,386	5,214	1,061	1,939	5,054	56,206	41.30%	4	0	4
Centre Party	C	1,825	1,749	2,164	1,105	1,276	1,276	762	857	1,275	320	723	1,006	2,096	1,411	2,579	505	647	884	4,426	1,768	1,732	591	2,759	33,736	24.79%	2	0	2
People's Party	F	2,644	1,041	888	722	124	349	142	187	398	298	553	128	3,503	575	704	663	142	593	4,073	2,387	1,045	429	4,060	25,648	18.85%	2	0	2
Moderate Party	M	966	728	514	321	312	271	247	268	694	201	298	217	1,325	264	600	154	88	185	1,344	913	736	161	2,554	13,361	9.82%	1	0	1
Left Party – Communists	VPK	342	199	121	24	5	31	18	14	28	30	58	5	423	180	53	230	45	167	1,229	350	33	152	358	4,095	3.01%	0	0	0
Christian Democratic Unity	KDS	297	155	206	113	124	133	18	47	40	21	37	32	187	59	187	45	22	128	321	131	131	59	388	2,881	2.12%	0	0	0
Communist League Marxists-Leninists	KFML	20	1	0	2	1	0	0	0	0	2	1	0	15	4	2	10	0	7	16	6	2	2	58	149	0.11%	0	0	0
Other parties		0	0	0	0	0	0	0	0	0	0	0	0	0	0	0	0	0	0	1	0	1	0	0	2	0.00%	0	0	0
Valid votes		11,099	7,417	7,262	2,860	2,116	2,833	2,185	1,628	3,020	1,218	2,544	1,573	11,127	5,238	6,305	3,934	1,296	3,553	24,796	10,769	4,741	3,333	15,231	136,078	100.00%	9	0	9
Rejected votes		14	8	11	0	0	1	0	1	0	3	3	1	9	7	10	4	1	0	20	5	5	1	48	152	0.11%			
Total polled exc. postal votes		11,113	7,425	7,273	2,860	2,116	2,834	2,185	1,629	3,020	1,221	2,547	1,574	11,136	5,245	6,315	3,938	1,297	3,553	24,816	10,774	4,746	3,334	15,279	136,230				
Postal votes		1,312	1,105	916	171	186	297	291	70	188	103	305	92	1,464	482	833	439	134	339	3,558	2,196	372	414	-15,279	-12				
Total polled inc. postal votes		12,425	8,530	8,189	3,031	2,302	3,131	2,476	1,699	3,208	1,324	2,852	1,666	12,600	5,727	7,148	4,377	1,431	3,892	28,374	12,970	5,118	3,748	0	136,218	88.42%			
Registered electors		14,008	9,865	9,428	3,451	2,569	3,734	2,740	1,972	3,515	1,491	3,121	2,004	13,827	6,469	8,077	4,865	1,633	4,363	32,343	14,823	5,645	4,114		154,057				
Turnout		88.70%	86.47%	86.86%	87.83%	89.61%	83.85%	90.36%	86.16%	91.27%	88.80%	91.38%	83.13%	91.13%	88.53%	88.50%	89.97%	87.63%	89.20%	87.73%	87.50%	90.66%	91.10%		88.42%				

The following candidates were elected: Ruth Andersson (S); Sven Andersson (S); Sven Antby (F); Robert Dockered (C); Arvid Enarsson (M); Olle Eriksson (C); Hilding Johansson (S); Elver Jonsson (F); and Herbert Larsson (S).

Permanent substitutions:

- Arvid Enarsson (M) died on 28 April 1971 and was replaced by Arne Andersson (M).
