= Bergius =

Bergius is a surname. Notable people with the surname include:

- Friedrich Bergius (1884–1949), German chemist
- Jennie Bergius Eriksson (born 1981), Swedish politician
- Jere Bergius (born 1987), Finnish pole vaulter
- Karl Heinrich Bergius (1790–1818), Prussian botanist, naturalist, cavalryman and pharmacist
- Peter Jonas Bergius (1730–1790), Swedish botanist

== See also ==
- Bergius process, a method of production of liquid hydrocarbons
- Berg (surname)
