= Peter Rådberg =

Swedish politician (born 1956)

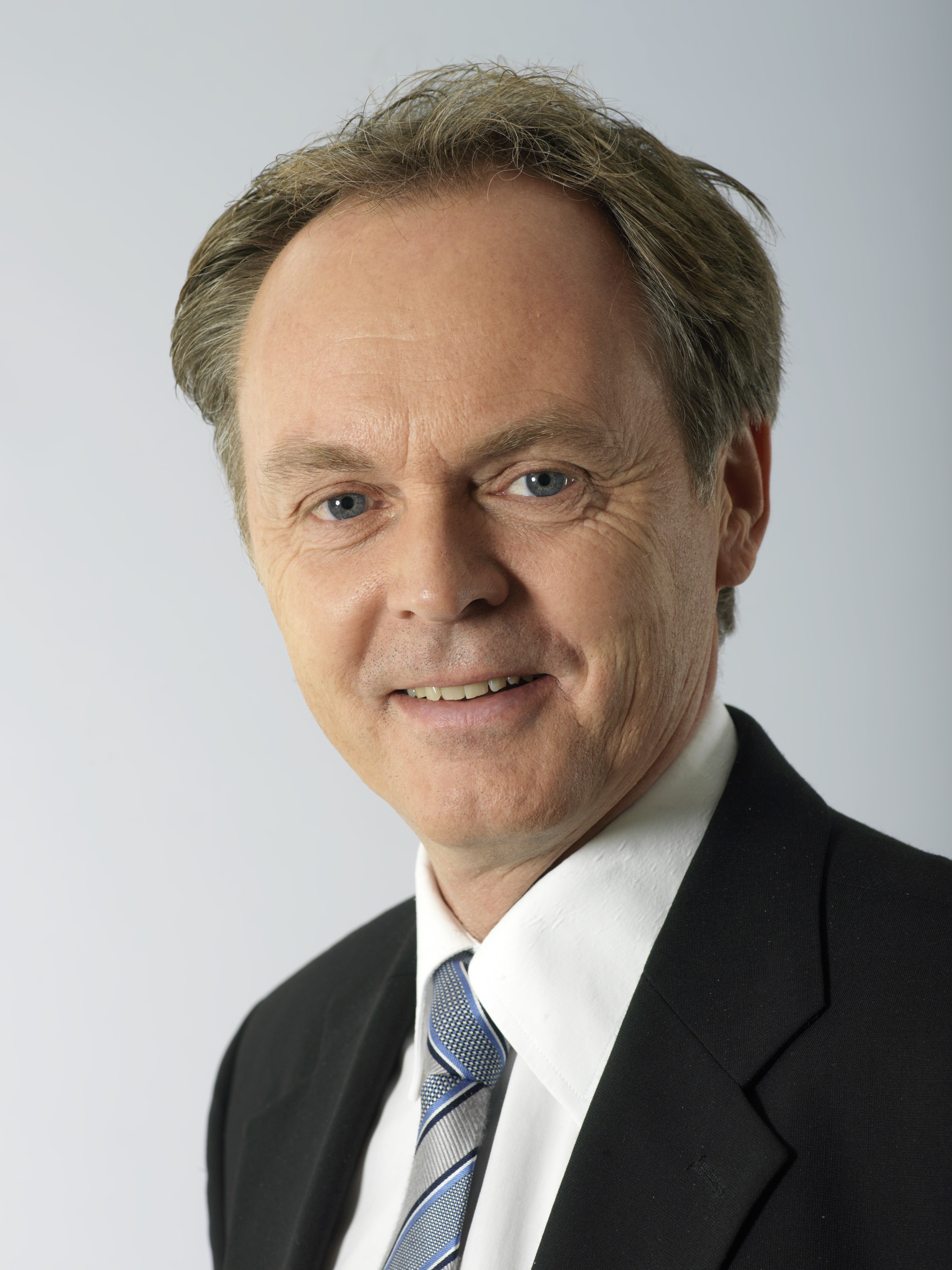
- Rådberg in October 2008

Member of the Riksdag
- In office 2 October 2006 – 29 September 2014
- Constituency: Västra Götaland County North

Personal details
- Born: 1956 (age 69–70)
- Party: Green Party

Ulf-Peter Ivar Rådberg (born 1956) is a Swedish politician and former member of the Riksdag, the national legislature. A member of the Green Party, he represented Västra Götaland County North between October 2006 and September 2014. He was also a substitute member of the Riksdag for Barbro Feltzing twice: between April 2005 and June 2005; and between November 2005 and May 2006.
