= Michael Melby =

Swedish politician (born 1969)

Member of the Riksdag
- Incumbent
- Assumed office 28 September 2026
- Constituency: Västra Götaland County North

Personal details
- Born: 1969 (age 56–57) Frändefors, Sweden
- Party: Social Democratic Party

Frank Lorentz Michael Melby (born 1969) is a Swedish politician and Member of the Riksdag. A member of the Social Democratic Party, he has represented Västra Götaland County North since September 2026.

Melby was born in 1969 in Frändefors. He is an industrial metalworker and has worked at Vargön Alloys for 40 years. He is a trade union activist for IF Metall. He is chairman of Film i Väst.

Melby was a member of the municipal council in Mellerud and Region Västra Götaland, the regional council (regionfullmäktige) in Västra Götaland. He was elected to the Riksdag at the 2026 general election.

Melby is married and has four children. He lives in Mellerud.
