= Peter Johnsson (politician) =

Swedish politician (born 1962)

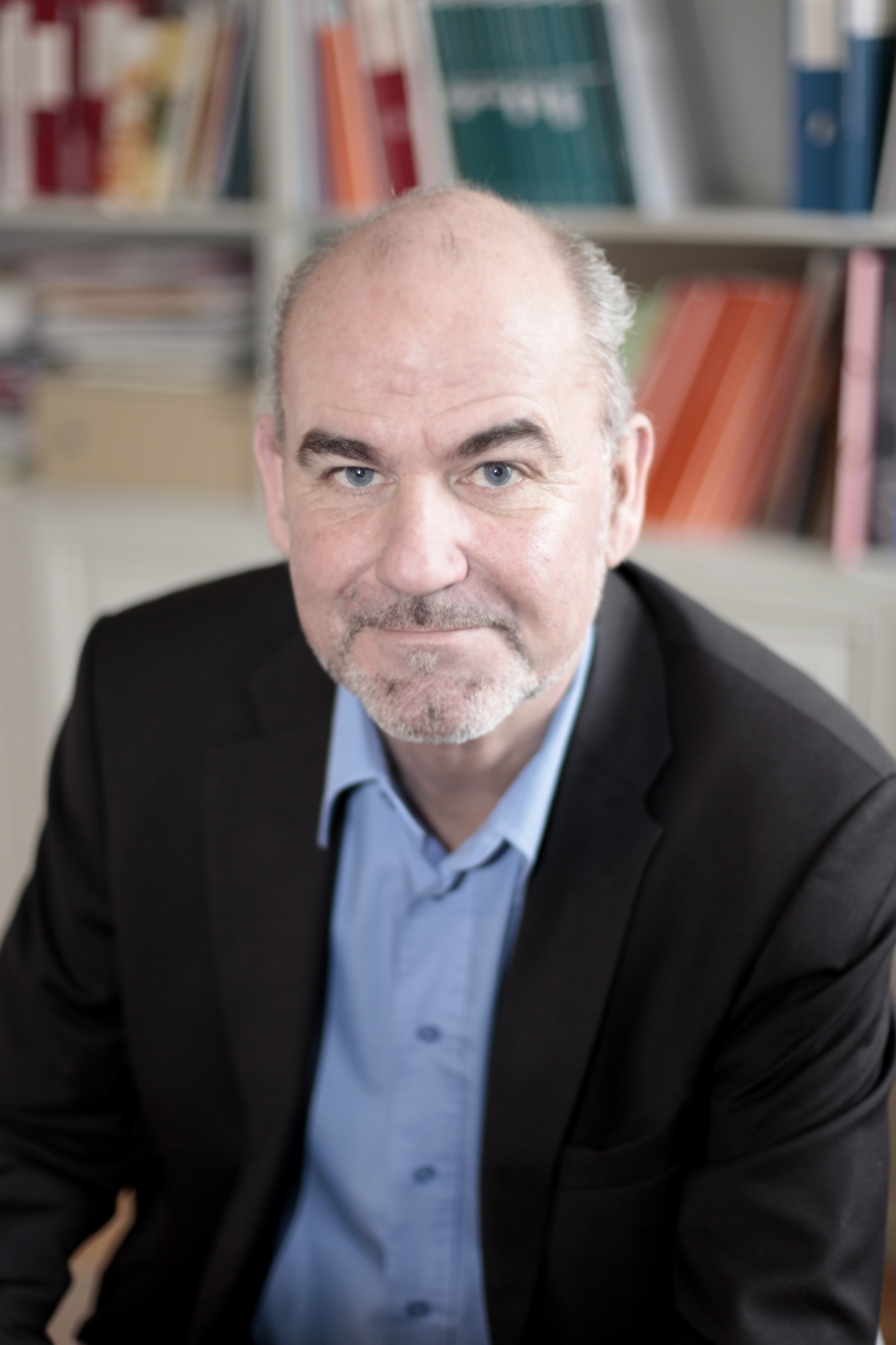
- Johnsson in February 2016

Member of the Riksdag
- In office 30 September 2002 – 24 September 2018
- Constituency: Västra Götaland County North

Personal details
- Born: Anders Peter Jonsson; 1962 (age 63–64)
- Party: Social Democratic Party

Anders Peter Johnsson (born 1962) is a Swedish politician and former member of the Riksdag, the national legislature. A member of the Social Democratic Party, he represented Västra Götaland County North between September 2002 and September 2018.

Johnsson is the son of metal worker Sune Oskar Jonsson and bakery worker Britt Inga-Lill Jonsson. He was a grinder at Volvo Hydraulic from 1979 to 1980, a sheet metal worker at Uddevallavarvet from 1980 to 1982 and a ventilation sheet metal worker from 1983 to 1987. He has been a sheet metal worker at the Volvo Aero Corporation in Trollhättan since 1987. He was a member of the municipal council in Trollhättan Municipality from 1998 to 2002.
