= Karin Engdahl =

Swedish politician (born 1972)

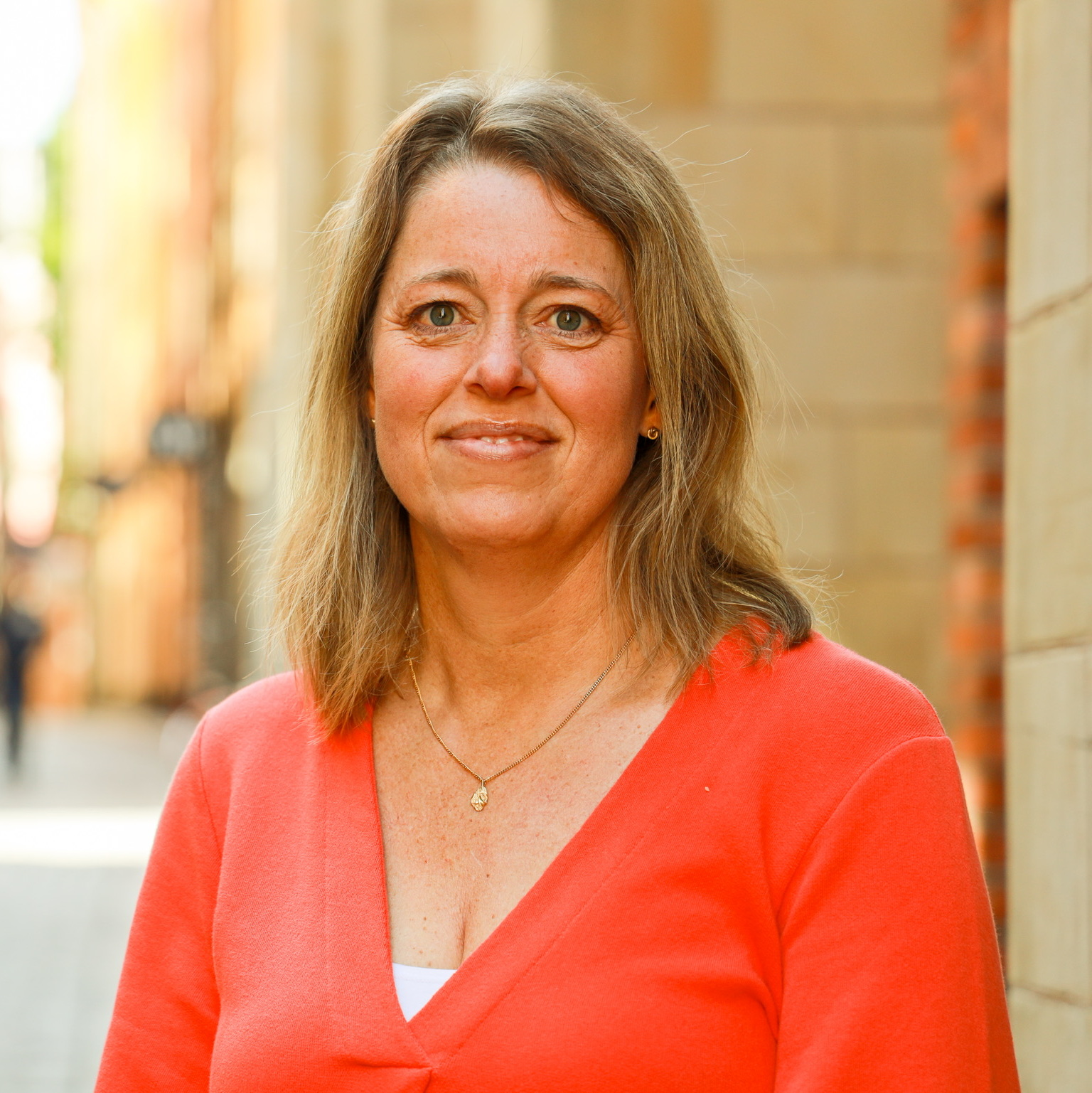

Member of the Riksdag
- Incumbent
- Assumed office 13 June 2022
- Constituency: Västra Götaland County North

Personal details
- Born: 1972 (age 53–54)
- Party: Social Democrats

Karin Engdahl (born 1972) is a Swedish politician (Social Democrat). Since 13 June 2022, she has served as a member of the Riksdag representing the constituency of Västra Götaland County North, following the resignation of Jörgen Hellman.
