= Jörgen Hellman =

Swedish politician (born 1963)

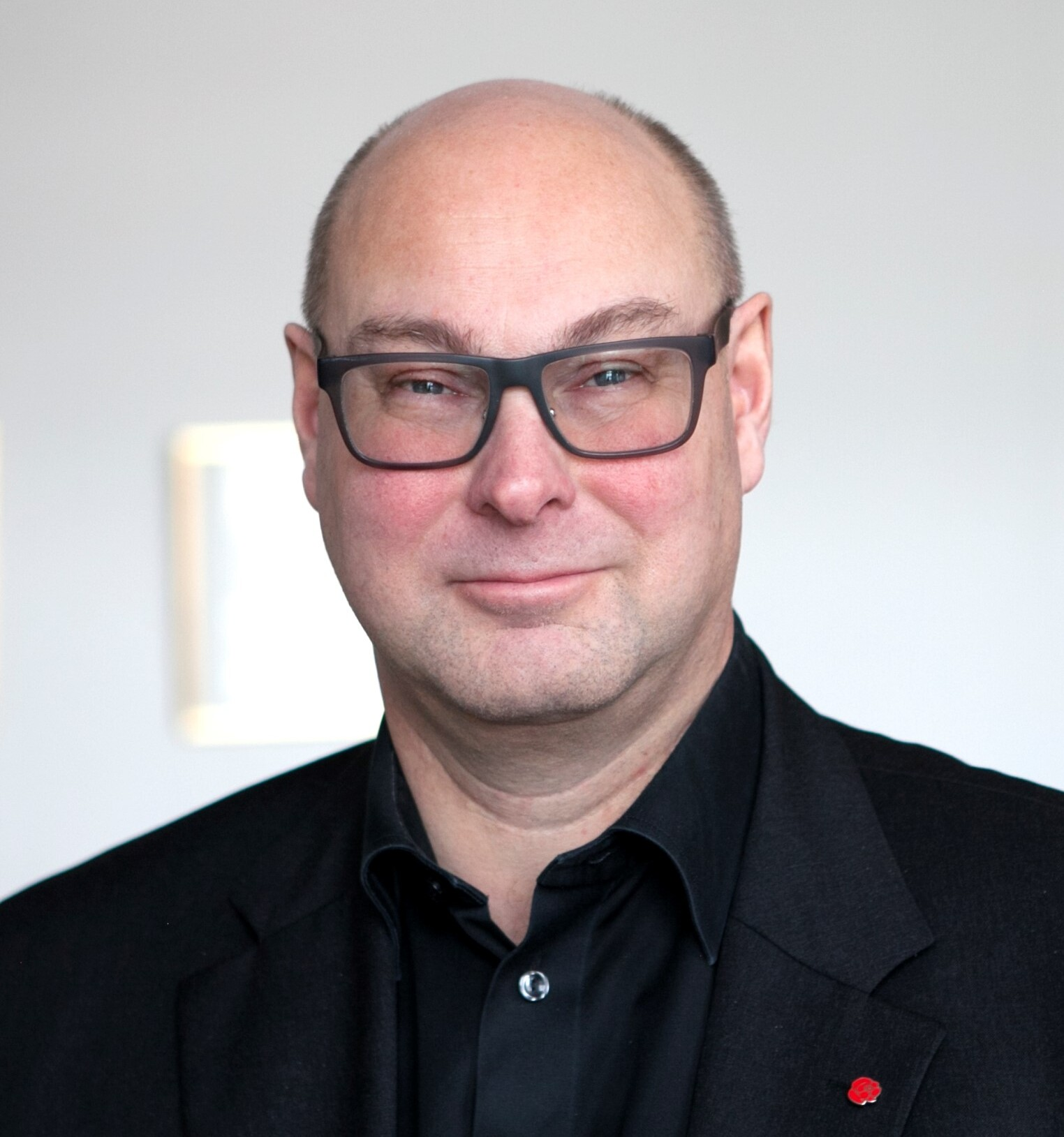
- Hellman in 2018

Member of the Riksdag
- In office 2 October 2006 – 10 June 2022
- Succeeded by: Karin Engdahl
- Constituency: Västra Götaland County North

Personal details
- Born: Sven Jörgen Hellman; 1963 (age 62–63)
- Party: Social Democratic Party

Sven Jörgen Hellman (born 1963) is a Swedish politician and former member of the Riksdag, the national legislature. A member of the Social Democratic Party, he represented Västra Götaland County North between October 2006 and June 2022.

== Biography ==
Hellman was born in 1963, to Sigvard and Anita Hellman. He was educated in Trollhättan and studied economics at the University of Gothenburg. He was a member of the municipal council in Lilla Edet Municipality from 1988 to 2002. He was a municipal commissioner at the municipal council from 1991 to 2002.

In June 2022, an investigation of the residencies of all Riksdag members by SVT's Uppdrag granskning investigative series found that the cottage in Vänersborg that Hellman claimed to be his main residence had no functioning toilet, shower or sink as it was not connected to the mains sewer and had no running water. It was also in a dilapidated condition with a broken window and a hole in the wall. The local municipal council had banned anyone from the living in the cottage. Riksdag regulations allow for any member whose main residence is more than 50 kilometers from the Riksdag to claim expenses for overnight accommodation in Stockholm. Hellman had claimed SEK 700,000 (US$70,000) since 2015. He claimed to live the cottage 20%-30% of the year but his neighbours claimed that they had not seen him at the cottage. An hour after Uppdrag granskning visited the cottage Hellman changed his registered address. He subsequently resigned from the Riksdag. A fraud investigation by a special prosecutor was closed in August 2022 due to a lack of evidence.
