= Jonathan Svensson =

Swedish politician (born 2000)

Member of the Riksdag
- Incumbent
- Assumed office 28 August 2023
- Preceded by: Paula Holmqvist
- Constituency: Västra Götaland County North

Personal details
- Born: 6 April 2000 (age 26)
- Party: Swedish Social Democratic Party

Jonathan Svensson (born 6 April 2000) is a Swedish politician serving as a member of the Riksdag since 2023. He is the youngest currently serving member of the parliament.
