= Louise Thunström =

Swedish politician (born 1973)

Member of the Riksdag
- Incumbent
- Assumed office 26 September 2022
- Constituency: Västra Götaland County North

Personal details
- Born: 1973 (age 52–53)
- Party: Social Democrats

Louise Thunström (born 1973) is a Swedish politician. She was elected as Member of the Riksdag in September 2022. She represents the constituency of Västra Götaland County North. She is affiliated with the Social Democrats.
