= Ann-Sofie Alm =

Swedish politician (born 1971)

Ann-Sofie Maria Alm

Member of the Riksdag
- Incumbent
- Assumed office 2018
- Constituency: Västra Götaland County North

Personal details
- Born: 12 October 1971 (age 54) Uppsala County, Sweden
- Party: Moderate Party

Ann-Sofie Maria Alm (born 12 October 1971) is a Swedish politician from the Moderate Party. Since 2018, she has been member of the Riksdag for Västra Götaland County North. She is a member of the Joint Foreign Affairs and Defence Committee.
