= Maria Andersson Willner =

Swedish politician (born 1978)

- Born: 1978 (age 47–48)
- Occupation: Politician
- Known for: Member of the Riksdag
- Political party: Social Democratic Party

Maria Andersson Willner (born 1978) is a Swedish Social Democratic Party politician.

She was elected member of the Riksdag for the period 2014–2018 from the Västra Götaland County South constituency.

In the Riksdag she was a member of the Committee on Foreign Affairs from 2014 to 2018, and parts of the period also a member of the Joint Foreign Affairs and Defence Committee .
