= Henrik Ripa =

Swedish politician (1968–2020)

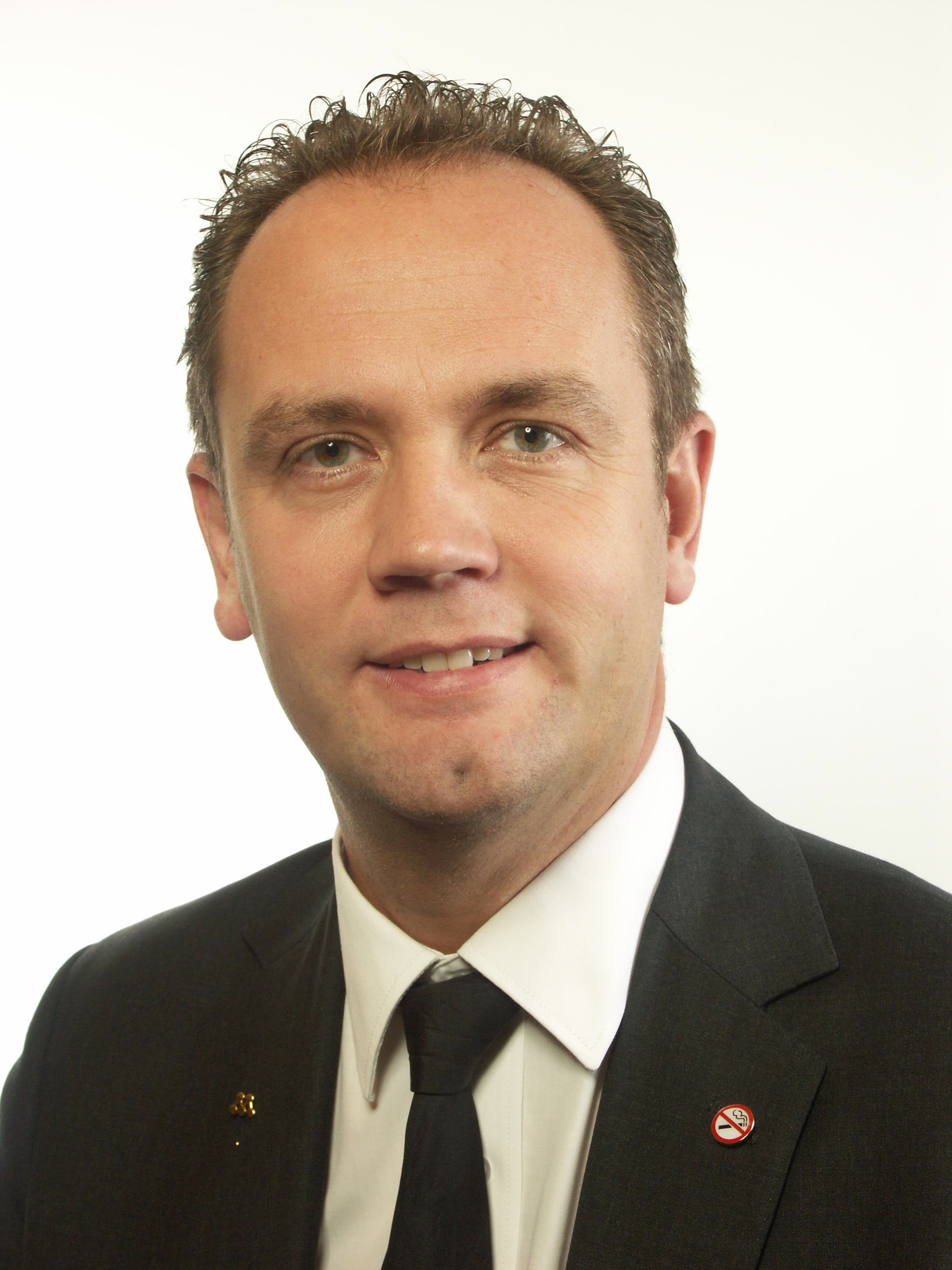
Henrik Ripa

Henrik Ripa (14 May 1968 – 12 July 2020) was a Swedish politician (Moderaterna) and Member of the Swedish Parliament 2010-2014. He represented the northern constituency of Västra Götaland North in the west of Sweden. Between 1998 and 2010 he was chairman of the municipality of Lerum.

In the Swedish parliament, Ripa served as alternate member for Moderaterna in the Committee on Health and Welfare with responsibility for public health, social service and dental care. He was also prominent in issues such as tobacco.
