= David Höglund Velasquez =

Swedish politician (born 1989)

David Hoglund Velasquez

Member of the Riksdag
- Incumbent
- Assumed office 28 September 2026
- Constituency: Västra Götaland County North

Personal details
- Born: Carl David Johan Höglund; 1989 (age 36–37) Sweden
- Party: Left Party
- Education: University of Borås

Carl David Johan Höglund Velasquez (née Höglund; born 1989) is a Swedish politician for the Left Party. He has been a member of the Riksdag since 2026, elected for the Västra Götaland County North constituency.

== Biography ==
Höglund Velasquez was born and raised in Uddevalla. He has worked in the Swedish Prison and Probation Service and studied at the University of Borås. He has held political positions for the Left Party since 2014.

=== Political activity ===
Höglund Velasquez has been a municipal politician in Uddevalla Municipality for the Left Party. In the 2018 Swedish local elections, he was personally elected to the municipal council after receiving 156 personal votes, corresponding to 6.08 percent of the Left Party's votes in the constituency. During the 2022–2026 mandate period, he was a member of the municipal council and group leader for the Left Party in Uddevalla. He was also a member of the municipal executive.

Ahead of the 2026 Swedish general election, Höglund Velasquez was first placed on the Left Party's parliamentary list in the Västra Götaland County North constituency. After the election, he became the Left Party's representative from the constituency in the Riksdag.

== See also ==
- List of members of the Riksdag, 2026–2030
