= Paula Holmqvist =

Swedish politician (born 1964)

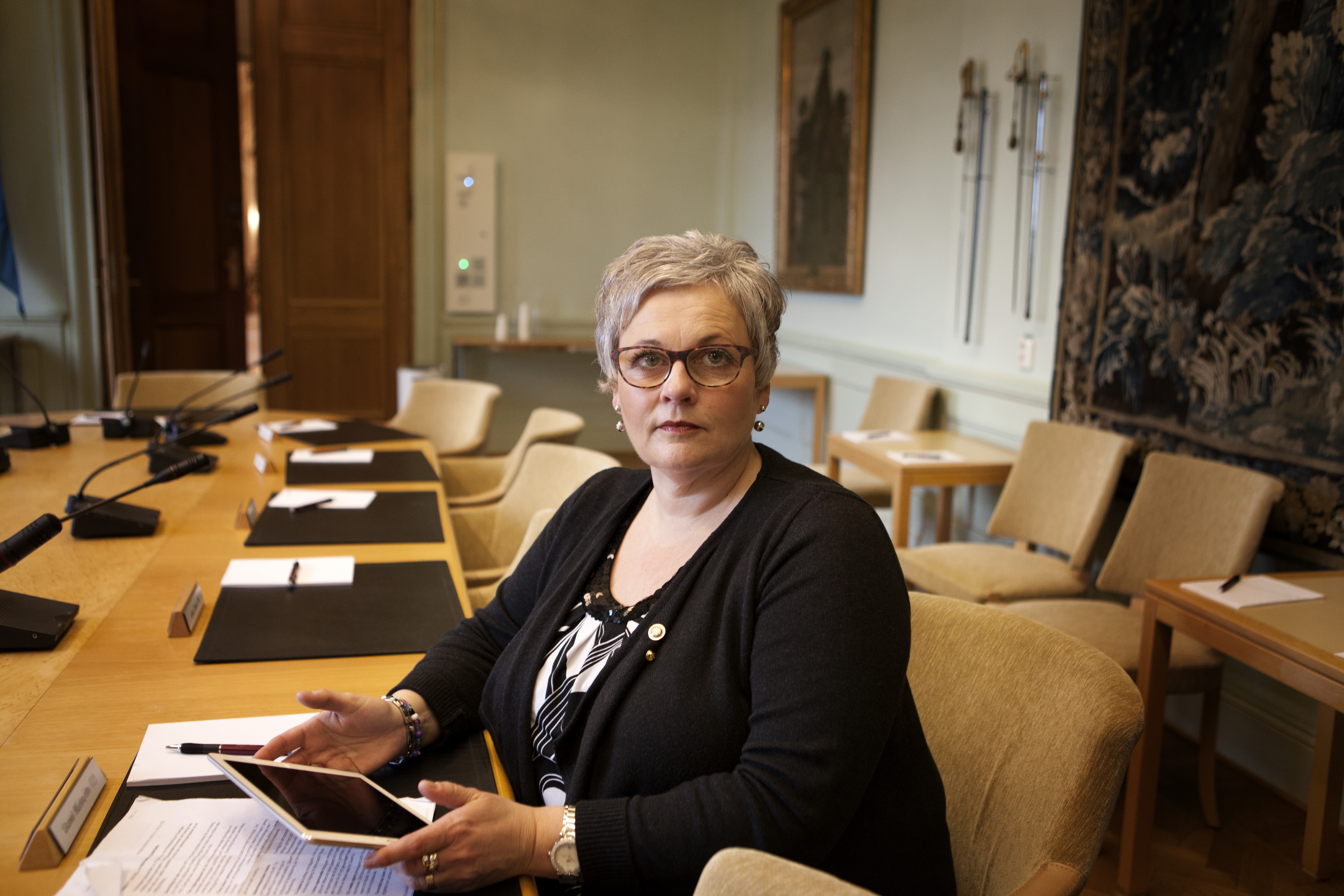

Member of the Riksdag
- In office 29 September 2014 – 4 March 2024
- Succeeded by: Jonathan Svensson
- Constituency: Västra Götaland County North

Personal details
- Born: 1964 (age 61–62)
- Party: Social Democrats

Paula Holmqvist (born 1964) is a Swedish politician. She served as member of the Riksdag from September 2014 to March 2024, representing the constituency of Västra Götaland County North.
