= Elizabeth Nyström =

Swedish politician (1942–2016)

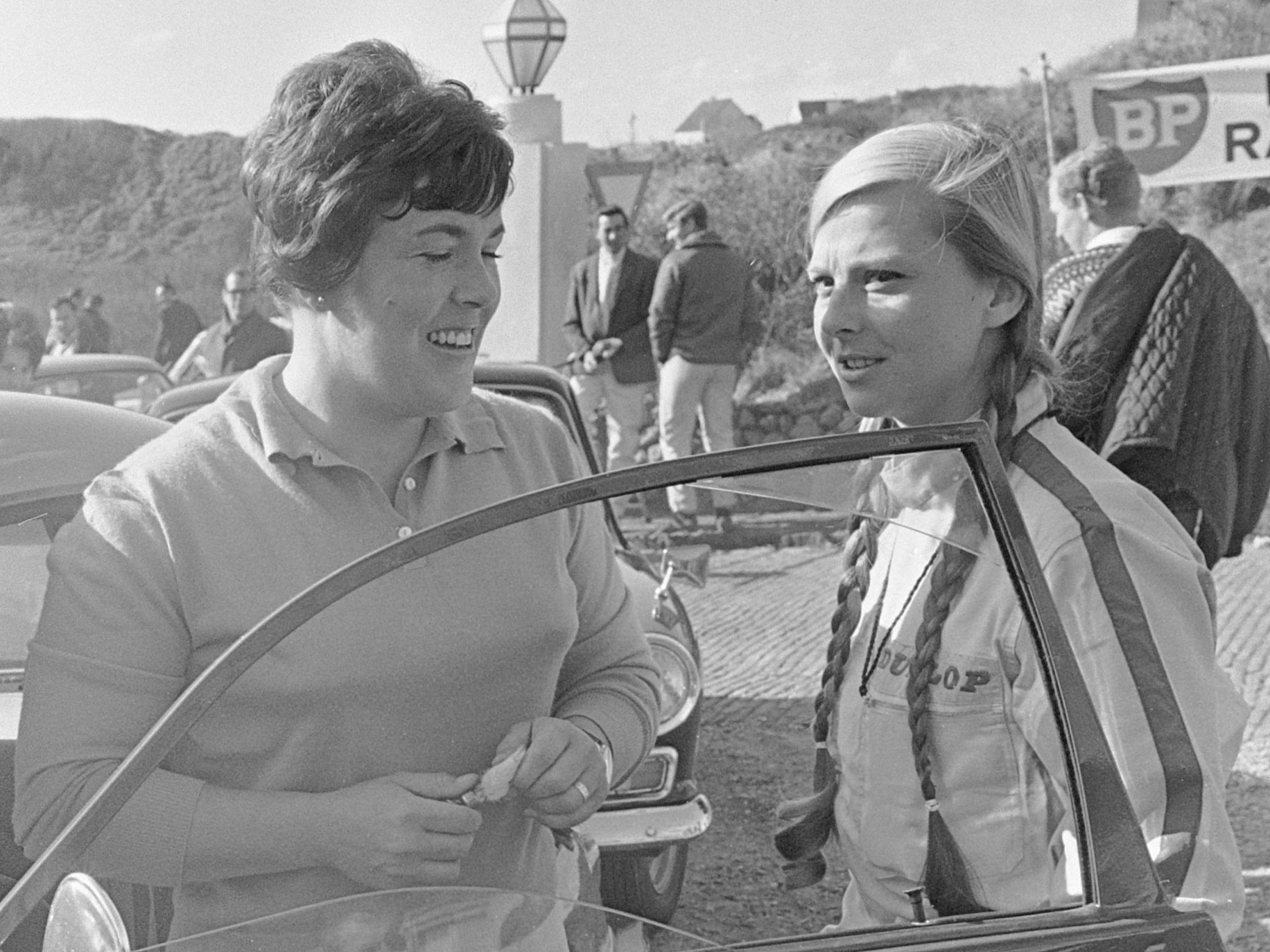
- Pat Moss and Elisabeth Nyström in 1967
- Born: 19 March 1942
- Died: 16 February 2016 (aged 73)
- Occupation: Politician
- Known for: Member of the Riksdag

Elizabeth Nyström (19 March 1942 – 16 February 2016) was a Swedish Moderate Party politician.

She served as a member of the Riksdag from the constituency Västra Götaland County North from 1996 to 2006.

== Early life ==
Nyström's father was a keen auto rally driver, and the 1960s she was map reader first for her father, and eventually for rally driver Pat Moss.
