= Mats Wiking =

Swedish politician (born 1961)

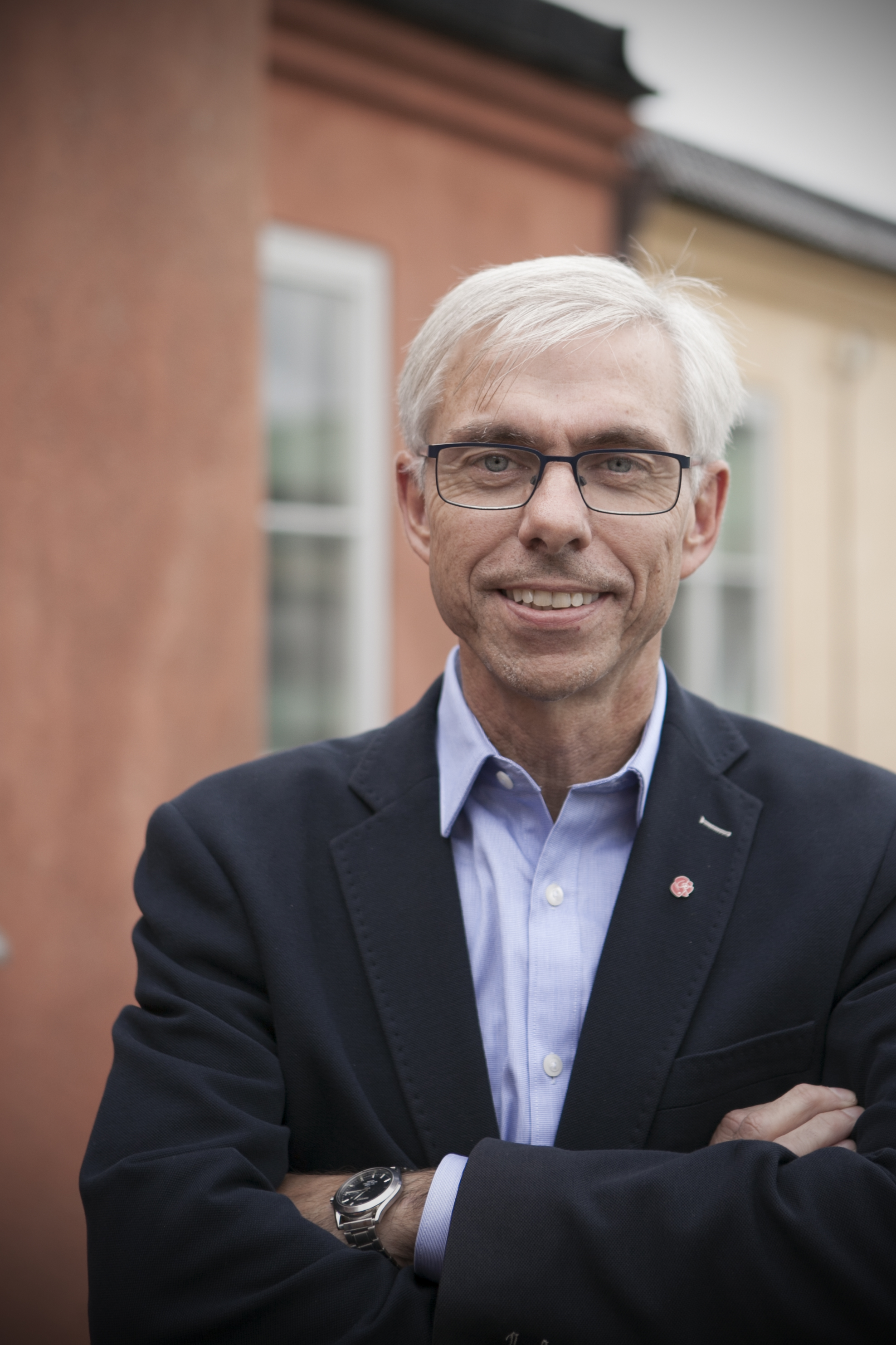
- Wiking in 2018

Member of the Riksdag
- Incumbent
- Assumed office 24 September 2018
- Constituency: Västra Götaland County North

Personal details
- Born: 1961 (age 64–65)
- Party: Social Democrats

Mats Wiking (born 1961) is a Swedish politician. Since September 2018, he serves as Member of the Riksdag representing the constituency of Västra Götaland County North. He was also elected as Member of the Riksdag in September 2022. He is affiliated with the Social Democrats.
