= Cecilia Prins =

Swedish politician

Member of the Riksdag
- Incumbent
- Assumed office 28 September 2026
- Constituency: Västra Götaland County North

Personal details
- Born: 1979 (age 46–47)
- Party: Liberals

Cecilia Prins (born 1979) is a Swedish politician from the Liberals. She has been a member of the Riksdag since 2026, elected for the Västra Götaland County North constituency.

== Biography ==
Prins has worked as a hairdresser and later as a vocational teacher. She has also studied behavioural science with a major in sociology and holds a Bachelor of Philosophy degree in sociology.

== Political career ==
Prins has been group leader for the Liberals in the municipal council of Vänersborg Municipality. She has also been a member of the municipal executive. In her political activities, Prins has been involved in school issues, democracy and gender equality, as well as in the community life in Vänersborg.

== See also ==
- List of members of the Riksdag, 2026–2030
