= Nils-Erik Söderqvist =

Swedish politician (born 1948)

Member of the Riksdag
- In office 3 October 1994 – 2 October 2006
- Constituency: Västra Götaland County North

Personal details
- Born: 1948 (age 77–78)
- Party: Social Democratic Party

Nils-Erik Söderqvist (born 1948) is a Swedish politician and former member of the Riksdag, the national legislature. A member of the Social Democratic Party, he represented Västra Götaland County North between October 1994 and October 2006.
