= Joint Foreign Affairs and Defence Committee =

The Joint Foreign Affairs and Defence Committee (Swedish: Sammansatta utrikes- och försvarsutskottet, UFöU) is a parliamentary committee in the Swedish Riksdag, made up of members of both the Foreign Affairs Committee and the Defence Committee.

Issues that are dealt with by a committee composed for the purpose are primarily decisions about Swedish participation in international initiatives. According to the regeringsformen (Government Act), Chapter 15, §16 requires the consent of the Riksdag in order for a Swedish armed force to be sent abroad. Following a proposal from the government, it is thus the Riksdag that ultimately decides on this after consideration of the issue in a composite committee. International security policy cooperation, such as the issue of host country agreements with NATO and Swedish security policy, are other issues that can be handled in a joint committee. The committee will also deal with international crisis management.

The Joint Foreign Affairs and defence Committee was formed on 25 October 2001. The committee was set up temporarily to deal with issues concerning Swedish and international security policies. The committee dealt with the security policy assessments that were included as part of the Government's bill on Continued renewal of the total defence bill (2001/02: 10) and a number of motions on security policy issues. The security policy orientation for the period 2016–2020 was also discussed by a composite committee in connection with the most recent defence decision. The Government's assessments of the security policy development are discussed in the composite committee, but the Government's proposal on how the Swedish defence should only be designed is discussed in the defence Committee.

== Members ==
=== Leadership ===
- Peter Hultqvist (S) — Chair
- Mattias Karlsson (SD) — Deputy Chair

=== Members ===
- Magdalena Thuresson (M)
- Morgan Johansson (S)
- Matheus Enholm (SD)
- Lena Johansson (S)
- Jörgen Berglund (M)
- Alexandra Völker (S)
- Joar Forssell (L)
- Olle Thorell (S)
- Margareta Cederfelt (M)
- Hanna Gunnarsson (V)
- Mikael Oscarsson (KD)
- Mikael Larsson (C)
- Helena Bouveng (M)
- Emma Berginger (MP)
- Ann-Sofie Alm (M)

== See also ==
- Foreign policy
