= Magnus Jacobsson =

Swedish politician (born 1968)

Member of the Riksdag
- Incumbent
- Assumed office 24 September 2018
- Constituency: Västra Götaland County North
- In office 5 October 1998 – 30 September 2002
- Constituency: Västmanland County

Personal details
- Born: 10 April 1968 (age 58)
- Party: Christian Democrats

Magnus Jacobsson (born 10 April 1968) is a Swedish politician. He has been a member of the Riksdag since 2018, having previously served from 1998 to 2002. From 1997 to 1999, he served as leader of the Young Christian Democrats.
