= Christina Oskarsson =

Swedish politician (born 1951)

Christina Oskarsson (previously Christina Nenes; born 1951) is a Swedish Social Democratic politician. She has been a member of the Riksdag since 1998.
