= Matheus Enholm =

Swedish politician (born 1979)

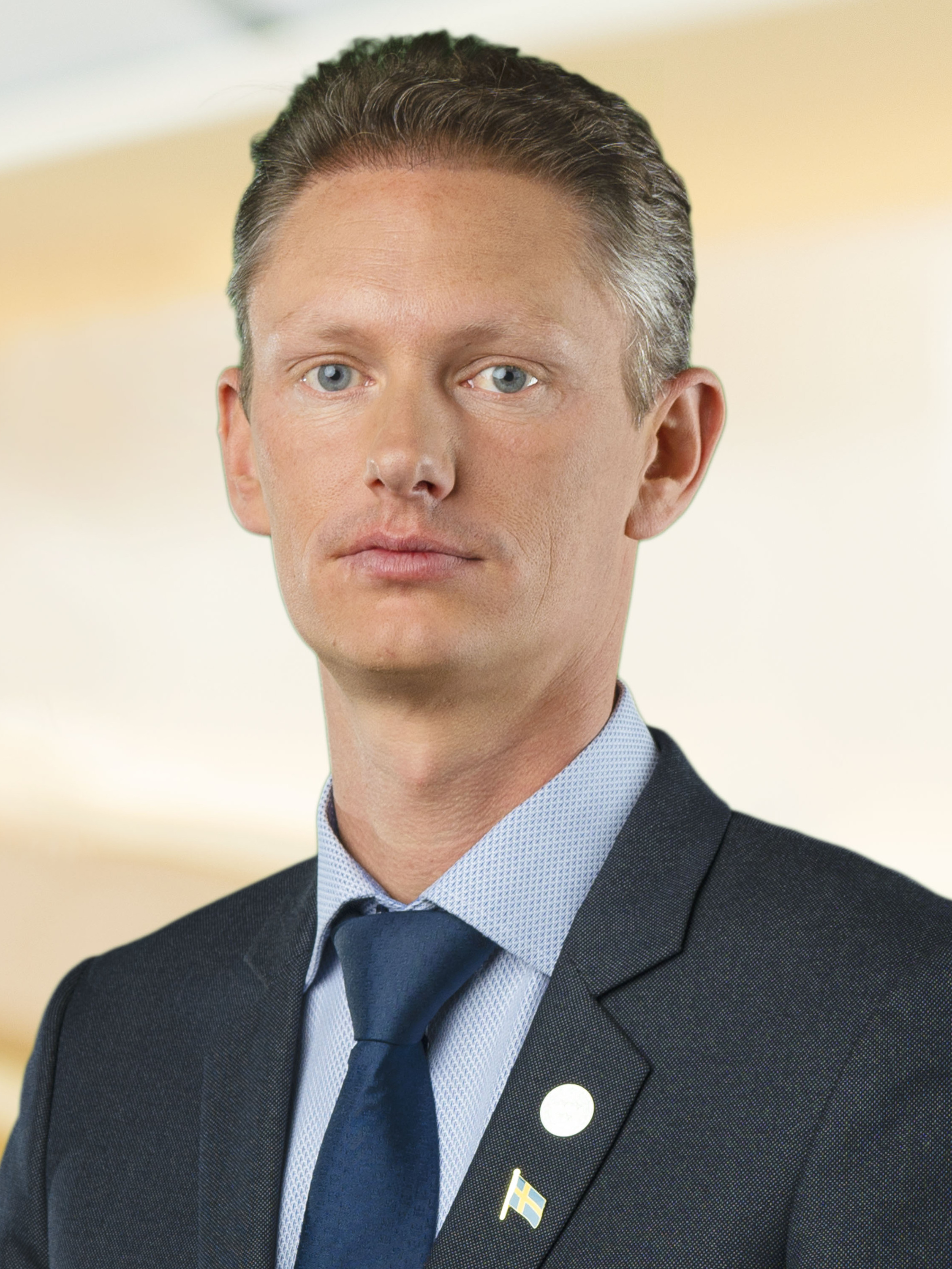

Deputy Leader of the Sweden Democrats in the Riksdag
- Incumbent
- Assumed office 8 June 2026
- Party Leader: Jimmie Åkesson
- Riksdag Leader: Linda Lindberg
- Preceded by: Michael Rubbestad

Member of the Riksdag
- Incumbent
- Assumed office 24 September 2018
- Constituency: Västra Götaland County North

Personal details
- Born: 12 June 1979 (age 47) Gothenburg and Bohus County, Sweden
- Party: Sweden Democrats
- Occupation: Estate agent, politician

Matheus Enholm (born 1979) is a Swedish politician and member of the Riksdag since 2018 for the Sweden Democrats party representing the Västra Götaland County North constituency and takes seat 230 in parliament.

Enholm worked in real estate before entering politics. He is a commissioner on the Constitution Committee in the Riksdag and is a member of the Judicial Committee. Enholm also serves as the SD's spokesman on freedom of speech and was appointed to lead a commission against online censorship. Since 2021, he has also been a municipal councilor for the SD in Munkedal Municipality.
