= Rossana Dinamarca =

Swedish politician (born 1974)

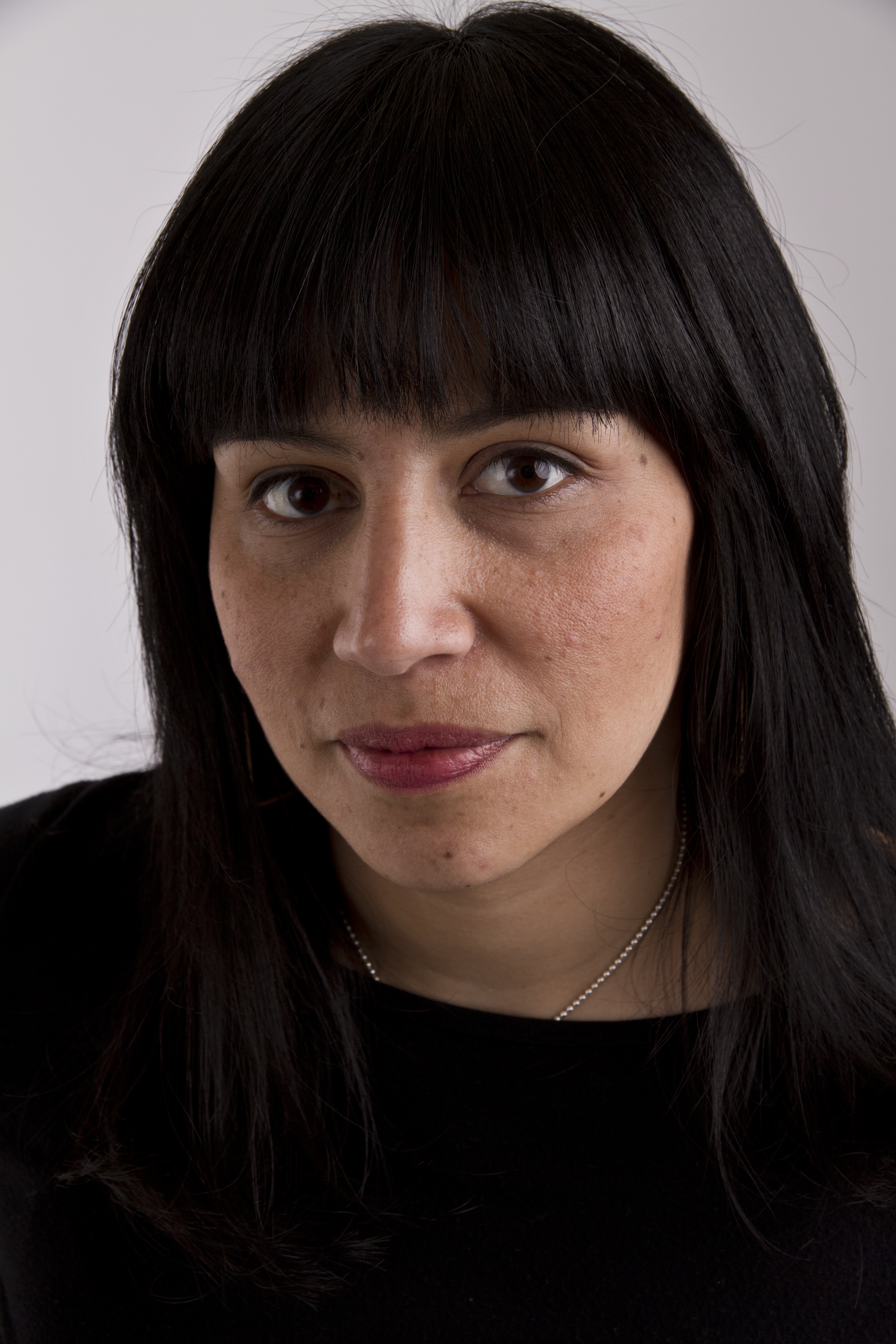
- Rossana Dinamarca

Personal details
- Born: Rossana Dinamarca; 2 January 1974 (age 52) Santiago de Chile, Chile
- Occupation: Politician

Rossana Dinamarca (born 2 January 1974) is a Chilean exile and Swedish Left Party politician. She served as member of the Riksdag from 30 September 2002 to 24 September 2018.
