= Jennie Bergius Eriksson =

Swedish politician (born 1982)

Member of the Riksdag
- Incumbent
- Assumed office 28 September 2026
- Constituency: Västra Götaland County North

Personal details
- Born: 7 May 1982 (age 44) Sweden
- Party: Moderate Party

Jennie Maina Lillemor Bergius Eriksson (born 7 May 1982) is a Swedish politician from the Moderate Party. She is also an economist and entrepreneur. She has been a member of the Riksdag since 2026, elected for the Västra Götaland County North constituency.

== Biography ==
Bergius Eriksson grew up in Mölndal and Lindome. She became involved in the Moderate Youth League during high school and participated in the election campaign for the 2006 Swedish general election during her time as a student in Jönköping.

She has a degree in economics and has worked with leadership and business development. She has worked as a business advisor at Almi Företagspartner and as a manager at Vattenfall. She later ran her own company, focusing on business development.

Bergius Eriksson has been active in municipal politics for the Moderate Party in Trollhättan Municipality. She has been chairman of the Moderate Party in Trollhättan and chairman of the community planning committee and the municipal housing company.

In the 2026 Swedish general election, Bergius Eriksson was elected to the Riksdag as the second place candidate on the Moderate Party's party list in the Västra Götaland County North constituency.

== See also ==
- List of members of the Riksdag, 2026–2030
