= Olle Eriksson (politician) =

Swedish politician (1925–1983)

Olle Eriksson (March 19, 1925 – March 14, 1983) was a Swedish politician. He was a member of the Centre Party, member of the Parliament of Sweden (lower chamber) from 1970, and of the unicameral parliament from 1971.
