= Björn Leivik =

Swedish politician (born 1948)

Björn Leivik (born 9 July 1948) is a Swedish politician of the Moderate Party. He has been a member of the Riksdag during the period 1998-2002 and again since 2006.
