= Annika Qarlsson =

Swedish politician (born 1964)

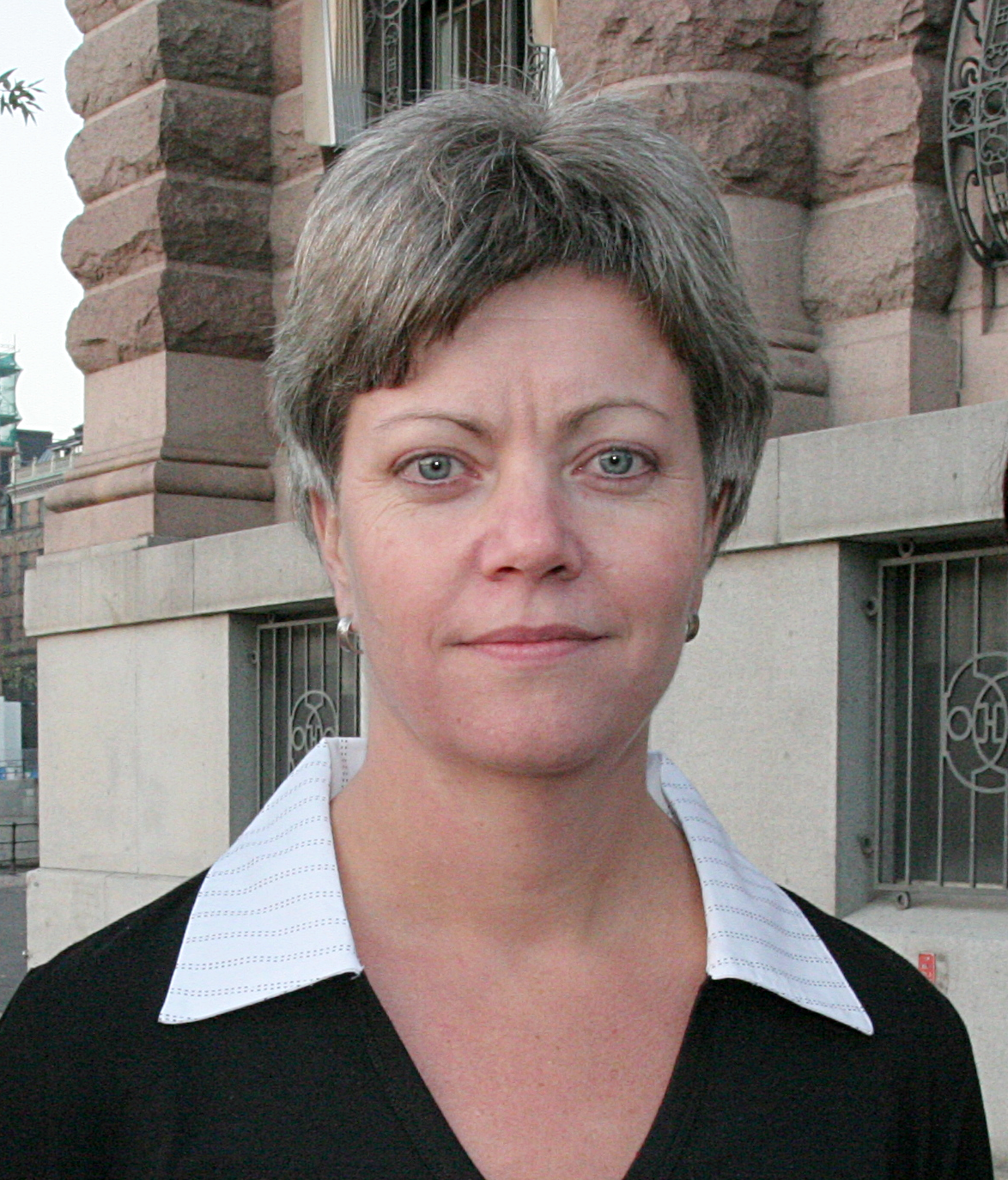

Member of Parliament for Swedish Parliament
- Incumbent
- Assumed office 2006
- In office 2002–2006

Personal details
- Born: November 22, 1964 (age 61)
- Party: Centre Party

Annika Qarlsson (born 1964) is a Swedish Centre Party politician. She has been a member of the Riksdag since 2002.
