= Ingemar Vänerlöv =

Swedish politician (born 1944)

Ingemar Vänerlöv (born 1944) is a Swedish Christian democratic politician, member of the Riksdag from 1998 to 2010.
