= Anita Brodén =

Swedish politician (born 1948)

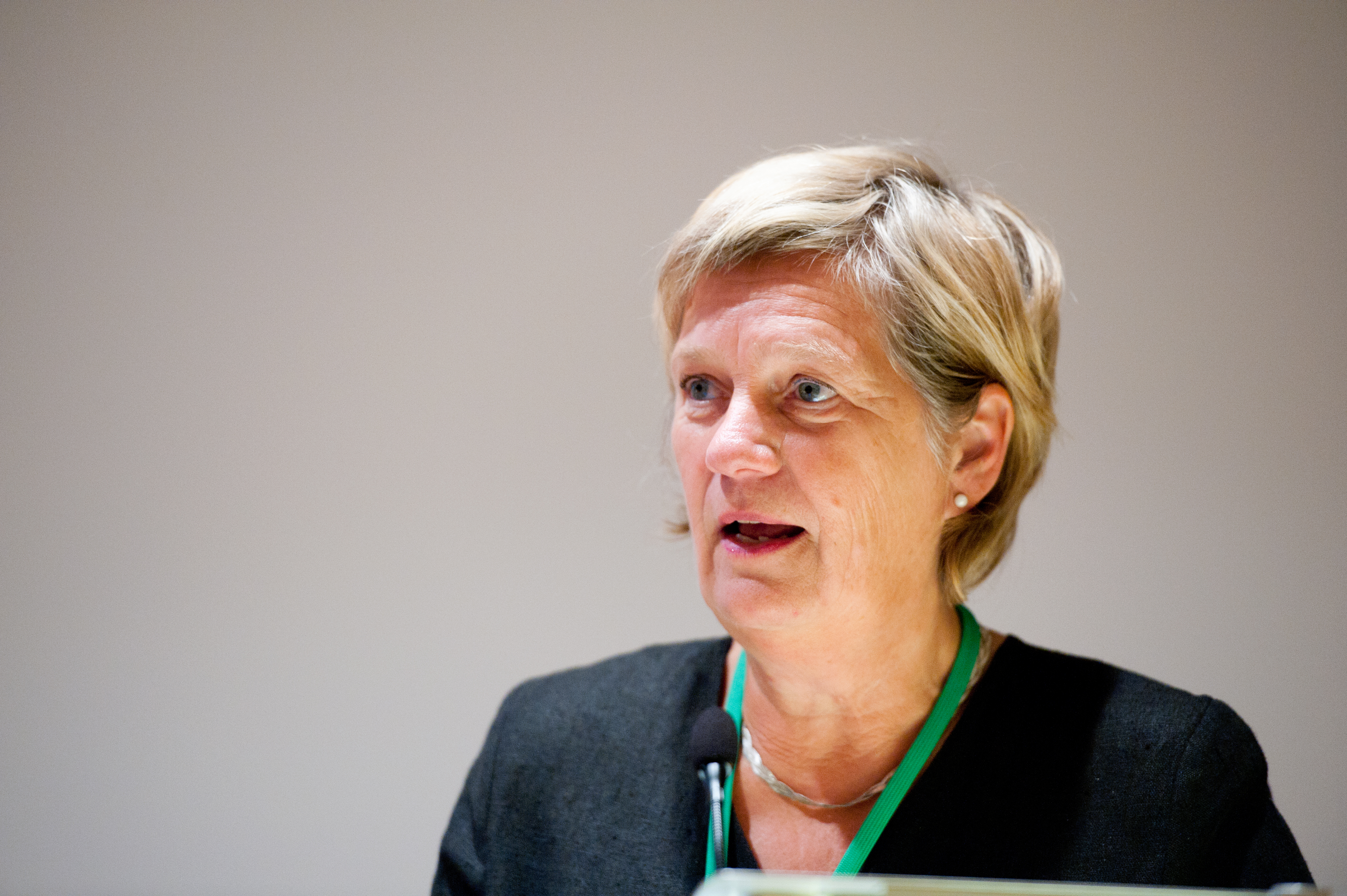
Anita Brodén.

Anita Brodén (born 1948) is a Swedish Liberal People's Party politician, member of the Riksdag since 2002.
