= Mikael Cederbratt =

Swedish politician (1955–2020)

Mikael Cederbratt (20 April 1955 – 6 May 2020) was a Swedish politician of the Moderate Party. He was member of the Riksdag from 2006 to 2018.

He graduated from the Police Academy in 1976, and prior to joining the Riksdag was a Police commissioner. He was married and had 3 children.
