= Stig Bertilsson =

Swedish politician and entrepreneur

Stig Lennart Bertilsson (born April 14, 1950) is a Swedish politician and entrepreneur who was a member of the Swedish parliament for the Moderate Party 1987–1996. Bertilsson was a political employee ("sakkunnig") in the Finance Ministry 1991–1994 (when Carl Bildt was Prime Minister). He has also had political posts in different Swedish municipalities. Bertilsson has been the owner of a number of small businesses in the media sector.

He is an active manager in sports, as the chairman of IFK Vänersborg since 2006. He was elected as the new chairman of the Swedish Bandy Association in 2014, at the annual general meeting on 14 June. He is also first vice president of the Federation of International Bandy.

Bertilsson is the chairman of Dalslandsturism since 2009, an organisation that promotes tourism in Dalsland, a Swedish traditional province, situated in Götaland in southern Sweden.
