= Marianne Andersson =

Swedish politician and economist

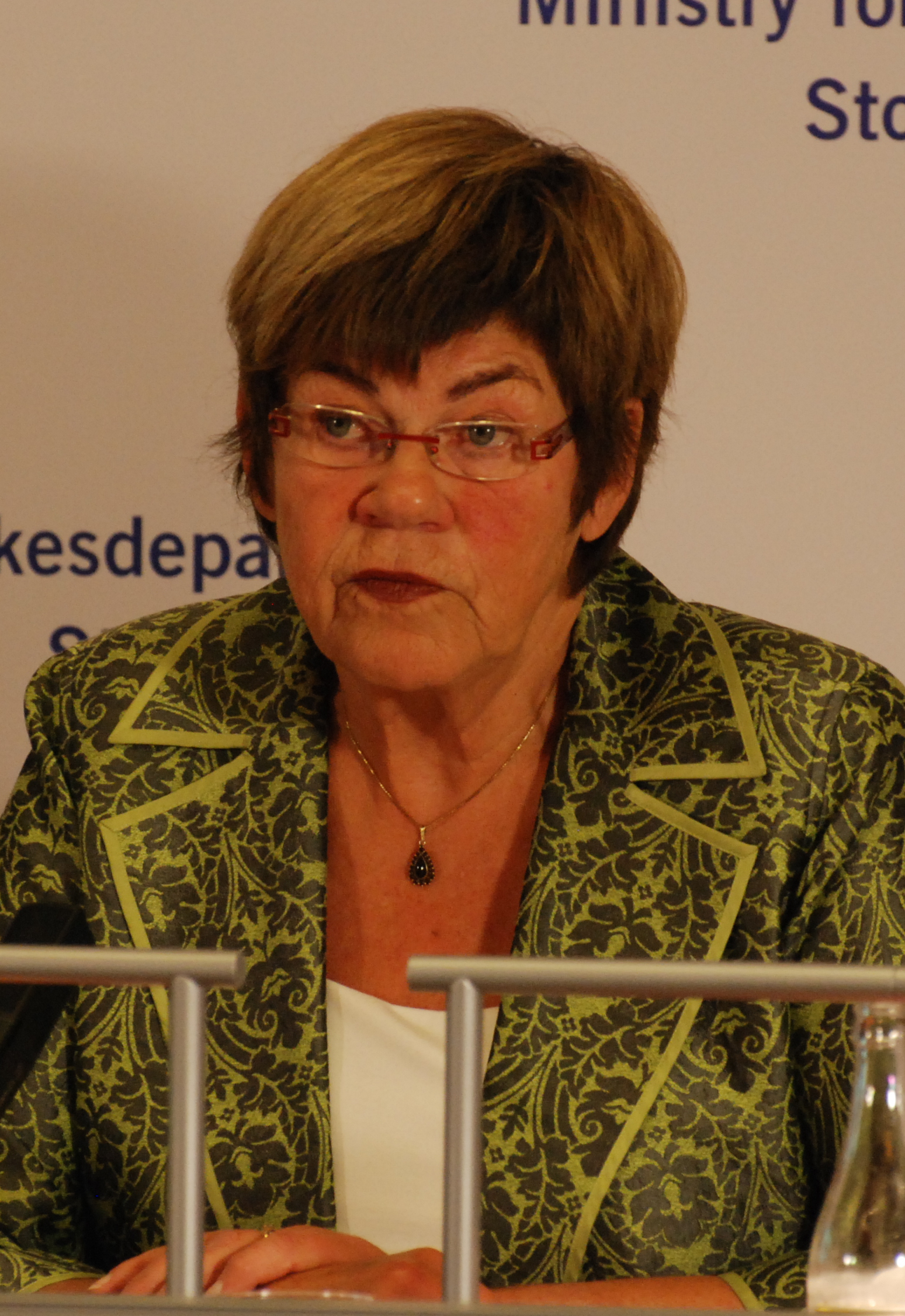
- Andersson in 2009
- Born: 26 May 1942 (age 83); Vårgårda, Sweden
- Occupations: Politician and economist
- Known for: Member of the Riksdag

Marianne Andersson (born 26 May 1942) is a Swedish Centre Party politician and economist.

She was born in Vårgårda to farmer Erik Andersson and Thea Andersson, and married Ivan Andersson in 1963. She graduated as economist from the Gothenburg School of Business, Economics and Law in 1981. She served as a member of the Riksdag from 1985 to 2002.

She joined the board of the Right Livelihood Award foundation from 2004.
