= Barbro Feltzing =

Swedish politician (born 1945)

Barbro Feltzing (born 24 April 1945) is a Swedish Green Party politician who served as a member of Parliament from 1994–2006.
