= Frändefors =

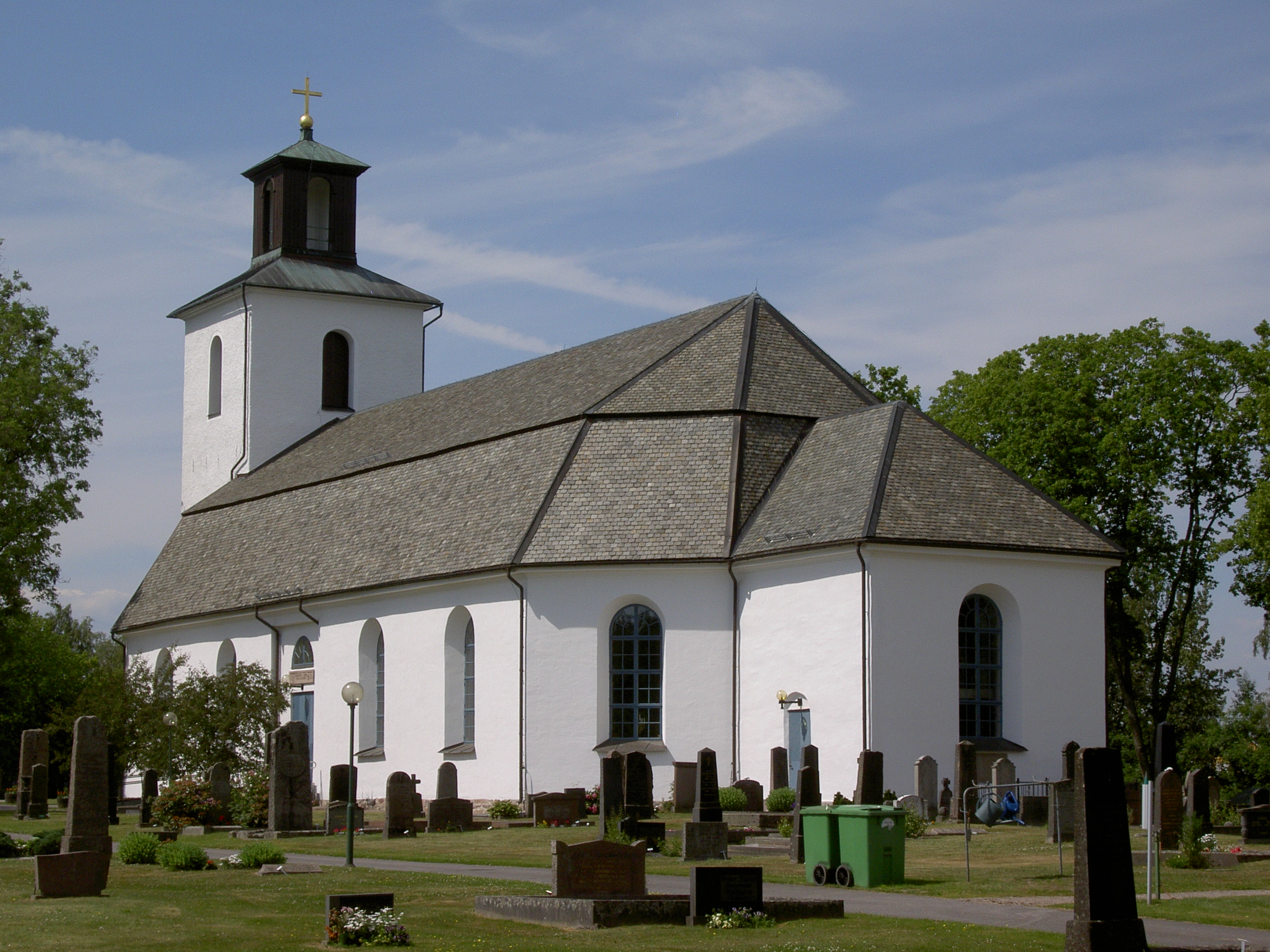
- Frändefors church

- Location within Västra Götaland Location within Sweden
- Coordinates: 58°30′N 12°17′E
- Country: Sweden
- Province: Dalsland
- County: Västra Götaland County
- Municipality: Vänersborg Municipality

Area
  - Total: 0.86 km^{2} (0.33 sq mi)

Population (31 December 2010)
  - Total: 613
  - Density: 715/km^{2} (1,850/sq mi)
- Time zone: UTC+1 (CET)
  - Summer (DST): UTC+2 (CEST)

Frändefors (Swedish pronunciation: [ˈfrɛ̂nːdɛˌfɔʂ]) is a locality situated in Vänersborg Municipality, Västra Götaland County, Sweden with 613 inhabitants in 2010.

== Sports club ==

The local multi-sports club Frändefors IF was founded in 1922 and celebrated 100 years in 2022. Its nickname is Fiffen. A clubroom was built in 1978, utilizing 5,000 voluntary man-hours. The club got artificial turf in 2014. The club colours are red and black. Its neighboring rival club is Brålanda IF. The women's team became district champions in Dalsland in 1977, and again in 2010.
