= Kalmar County (Riksdag constituency) =

Constituency of the Riksdag, the national legislature of Sweden

- Kalmar Län
- Constituency for the Riksdag
- Location of Kalmar County within Sweden
- County: Kalmar
- Population: 245,483 (2025)
- Electorate: 191,157 (2026)
- Area: 11,683 km^{2} (2026)

Current constituency
- Created: 1970
- Seats: List (Note: Constituency seats only.): 7 (2026–present); 8 (2002–2026); 9 (1973–2002); 10 (1970–1973)
- Member of the Riksdag: List: Emmy Ahlstedt (C); Mattias Bäckström Johansson (SD); Marcus Fridlund (S); Lena Hallengren (S); Marie Nicholson (M); Olle Olson (M); Johnny Svedin (SD); Carl-Wiktor Svensson (KD)
- Created from: Kalmar County

Kalmar County (Swedish: Kalmar Län) is one of the 29 multi-member constituencies of the Riksdag, the national legislature of Sweden. The constituency was established in 1970 when the Riksdag changed from a bicameral legislature to a unicameral legislature. It is conterminous with the county of Kalmar. The constituency currently elects seven of the 349 members of the Riksdag using the open party-list proportional representation electoral system. At the 2026 general election it had 191,157 registered electors.

== Electoral system ==
Kalmar County currently elects seven of the 349 members of the Riksdag using the open party-list proportional representation electoral system. Constituency seats are allocated using the modified Sainte-Laguë method. Only parties that reach the 4% national threshold and parties that receive at least 12% of the vote in the constituency compete for constituency seats. Supplementary levelling seats may also be allocated at the constituency level to parties that reach the 4% national threshold.

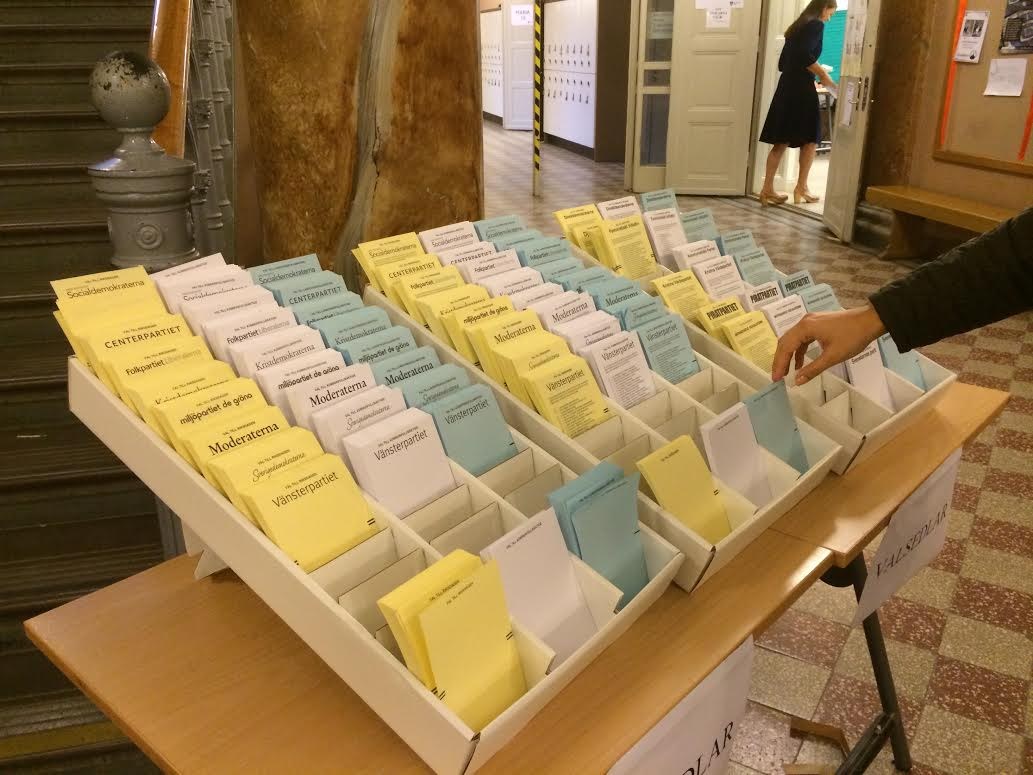
A selection of ballot papers available for voters at the 2014 general election in Stockholm - yellow for the Riksdag, blue for the regional council and white for the municipal council

Prior to 1997 voters could cast any ballot paper they wanted, though it had to contain the name of a party and the name of at least one candidate nominated by that party in the constituency. It was common for parties to hand out ballot papers with their name and list of candidates at the entrance of polling stations. Voters could delete the names of candidates or write-in the names of other candidates but in practice these options weren't used enough by voters to have any significant impact on the results and consequently elections operated as a closed system.

Since 1997, elections in Sweden follow the French model in having separate ballot papers for each party/list in a constituency. There are two ballot papers for each party - a party ballot paper (partivalsedel) with just the name of the party and a name ballot paper (namnvalsedel) with the name of the party and its list of candidates. There are also blank ballot papers (blank valsedel). Voters can initially pick as many ballot papers as they wish and then, in the secrecy of the voting booth, they select a single ballot paper of their choice. If they chose a name ballot paper they have the option of casting a preferential vote for one of their chosen party's candidates. If they chose a blank ballot paper they can write the name of any party including unregistered parties and, optionally, they can write the name of any person as their preferred candidate, even one that does not belong to their chosen party. They then place their chosen ballot paper in an envelope which is placed in the ballot box, discarding all other ballot papers they picked.

Seats won by each party/list in a constituency are allocated to its candidates in order of preference votes (a personal mandate), provided that the candidate has received at least 8% of votes cast for their party in the constituency (5% since January 2011). Any unfilled seats are then allocated to the party's remaining candidates in the order they appear on the party list (a party mandate).

== Election results ==
=== Summary ===
Election	Left V / VPK			Social Democrats S			Greens MP			Centre C			Liberals L / FP / F			Moderates M			Christian Democrats KD / KDS			Sweden Democrats SD		
Election	Votes	%	Seats	Votes	%	Seats	Votes	%	Seats	Votes	%	Seats	Votes	%	Seats	Votes	%	Seats	Votes	%	Seats	Votes	%	Seats
2026	9,930	6.14%	0	46,974	29.03%	2	6,686	4.13%	0	10,365	6.41%	0	6,888	4.26%	0	30,324	18.74%	2	13,575	8.39%	1	34,565	21.36%	2
2022	7,484	4.64%	0	51,179	31.74%	3	5,427	3.37%	0	10,523	6.53%	0	5,126	3.18%	0	28,672	17.78%	2	11,226	6.96%	1	39,516	24.50%	2
2018	9,851	6.12%	0	50,178	31.19%	3	4,645	2.89%	0	15,774	9.81%	1	6,038	3.75%	0	27,733	17.24%	1	11,583	7.20%	1	33,075	20.56%	2
2014	7,235	4.56%	0	56,370	35.49%	3	7,435	4.68%	0	13,867	8.73%	1	5,611	3.53%	0	32,313	20.35%	2	7,448	4.69%	0	24,260	15.27%	2
2010	7,679	4.96%	0	55,116	35.62%	4	8,713	5.63%	0	13,829	8.94%	1	7,847	5.07%	0	41,631	26.90%	3	9,341	6.04%	0	8,964	5.79%	0
2006	7,426	5.03%	0	61,007	41.35%	4	5,687	3.85%	0	16,306	11.05%	1	7,680	5.21%	0	31,430	21.30%	2	10,513	7.13%	1	4,675	3.17%	0
2002	10,519	7.29%	0	63,089	43.74%	4	5,210	3.61%	0	15,360	10.65%	1	12,865	8.92%	1	18,331	12.71%	1	16,112	11.17%	1	1,157	0.80%	0
1998	16,742	11.51%	1	57,275	39.36%	4	5,669	3.90%	0	13,409	9.22%	1	4,116	2.83%	0	26,651	18.32%	2	19,408	13.34%	1			
1994	8,805	5.56%	0	75,379	47.58%	5	6,891	4.35%	0	20,559	12.98%	2	6,910	4.36%	0	30,044	18.96%	2	6,880	4.34%	0			
1991	6,099	3.85%	0	62,692	39.57%	4	4,297	2.71%	0	22,839	14.41%	1	9,269	5.85%	0	28,905	18.24%	2	12,449	7.86%	1			
1988	7,072	4.51%	0	71,092	45.38%	4	6,792	4.34%	0	28,361	18.10%	2	12,684	8.10%	1	24,839	15.85%	2	5,549	3.54%	0			
1985	6,263	3.82%	0	75,298	45.97%	4	2,102	1.28%	0	31,499	19.23%	2	16,001	9.77%	1	32,364	19.76%	2	with C					
1982	6,302	3.80%	0	76,527	46.13%	5	2,151	1.30%	0	35,982	21.69%	2	6,481	3.91%	0	34,480	20.79%	2	3,807	2.30%	0			
1979	6,513	3.96%	0	72,549	44.11%	4				39,438	23.98%	2	11,737	7.14%	1	30,650	18.64%	2	3,069	1.87%	0			
1976	5,351	3.24%	0	71,489	43.33%	4				48,860	29.62%	3	11,059	6.70%	0	24,843	15.06%	2	3,127	1.90%	0			
1973	6,075	3.87%	0	68,928	43.87%	5				47,022	29.93%	3	8,566	5.45%	0	22,454	14.29%	1	3,765	2.40%	0			
1970	5,423	3.53%	0	69,136	45.04%	5				39,027	25.42%	3	14,711	9.58%	1	20,636	13.44%	1	4,189	2.73%	0			

(Excludes levelling seats. Figures in italics represent alliances/joint lists.)

=== Detailed ===
Party has received at least 4% of the vote nationally and is entitled to compete for constituency seats.

==== 2020s ====
===== 2026 =====
Results of the 2026 general election held on 13 September 2026:

Party		Votes per municipality												Total votes	%	Seats		
Party		Borg- holm	Emma- boda	Högsby	Hults- fred	Kalmar	Mönste- rås	Mörby- långa	Nybro	Oskars- hamn	Torsås	Väster- vik	Vimmer- by	Total votes	%	Con.	Lev.	Tot.
Swedish Social Democratic Party	S	1,876	1,729	820	2,390	14,215	2,541	2,887	3,624	5,149	1,121	7,732	2,890	46,974	29.03%	2	0	2
Sweden Democrats	SD	1,692	1,368	816	1,865	8,275	2,407	2,177	2,994	4,440	1,322	4,977	2,232	34,565	21.36%	2	0	2
Moderate Party	M	1,560	885	358	1,086	10,338	1,279	2,459	2,151	3,195	813	4,321	1,879	30,324	18.74%	2	0	2
Christian Democrats	KD	721	396	464	1,042	3,287	828	919	999	1,764	411	1,765	979	13,575	8.39%	1	0	1
Centre Party	C	689	328	179	489	2,996	434	1,002	761	794	358	1,586	749	10,365	6.41%	0	1	1
Left Party	V	320	384	167	636	3,403	439	467	1,001	968	219	1,377	549	9,930	6.14%	0	0	0
Liberals	L	384	209	88	244	2,250	304	577	466	745	219	1,069	333	6,888	4.26%	0	0	0
Green Party	MP	447	165	89	182	2,636	227	712	346	407	188	953	334	6,686	4.13%	0	0	0
Örebro Party	ÖP	39	32	17	54	240	50	38	95	101	38	104	73	881	0.54%	0	0	0
Alternative for Sweden	AfS	22	16	10	38	178	32	43	62	84	31	113	33	662	0.41%	0	0	0
Christian Values Party	KrVP	12	6	3	24	56	10	10	40	45	2	31	18	257	0.16%	0	0	0
Ambition Sweden	AS	12	5	2	9	33	13	7	15	14	4	40	22	176	0.11%	0	0	0
Pirate Party	PP	4	8	2	7	62	8	4	18	6	2	14	10	145	0.09%	0	0	0
Citizens' Coalition	MED	2	1	0	5	32	5	11	13	18	4	33	10	134	0.08%	0	0	0
Human Rights and Democracy	MoD	3	6	2	1	8	7	4	12	25	0	6	1	75	0.05%	0	0	0
Communist Party of Sweden	SKP	1	3	0	3	13	2	1	2	1	0	5	0	31	0.02%	0	0	0
Direct Democrats	DD	0	2	0	1	12	2	0	2	1	2	4	1	27	0.02%	0	0	0
United Voice	ER	3	0	1	2	5	0	1	2	2	0	1	3	20	0.01%	0	0	0
Independent Rural Party	LPo	0	0	0	3	1	7	0	1	2	0	3	2	19	0.01%	0	0	0
Nordic Resistance Movement	NMR	1	0	0	0	2	0	1	2	1	0	2	1	10	0.01%	0	0	0
Volt Sweden	Volt	0	2	0	0	1	0	0	0	0	3	2	1	9	0.01%	0	0	0
Unity	ENH	0	0	1	0	4	1	1	0	0	1	0	0	8	0.00%	0	0	0
Nuance Party	PNy	0	0	0	0	4	0	0	0	0	0	0	1	5	0.00%	0	0	0
99 Black Balloons		0	0	1	0	0	0	0	3	0	0	0	0	4	0.00%	0	0	0
Donald Duck Party		0	0	0	0	2	0	0	1	1	0	0	0	4	0.00%	0	0	0
United Sweden		1	0	0	0	1	1	0	0	0	0	1	0	4	0.00%	0	0	0
Turning Point Party	PV	0	1	0	0	0	0	0	0	0	0	2	0	3	0.00%	0	0	0
Origin		1	0	0	0	0	0	0	0	0	0	1	0	2	0.00%	0	0	0
RegleraAI.nu		0	0	0	0	1	0	0	1	0	0	0	0	2	0.00%	0	0	0
The Push Buttons	Kn	0	0	0	0	2	0	0	0	0	0	0	0	2	0.00%	0	0	0
A Good Sweden		0	0	0	0	0	0	0	0	0	0	1	0	1	0.00%	0	0	0
Architecture Uprising Party		0	0	0	0	1	0	0	0	0	0	0	0	1	0.00%	0	0	0
Classical Liberal Party	KLP	0	1	0	0	0	0	0	0	0	0	0	0	1	0.00%	0	0	0
Pax		0	0	0	1	0	0	0	0	0	0	0	0	1	0.00%	0	0	0
Profit Party		0	0	0	0	1	0	0	0	0	0	0	0	1	0.00%	0	0	0
Responsible Intelligence in Politics		0	0	0	0	0	0	1	0	0	0	0	0	1	0.00%	0	0	0
Security Party		1	0	0	0	0	0	0	0	0	0	0	0	1	0.00%	0	0	0
Socialist Party		0	0	0	0	1	0	0	0	0	0	0	0	1	0.00%	0	0	0
The Anarchists		0	0	0	0	1	0	0	0	0	0	0	0	1	0.00%	0	0	0
Valid votes		7,791	5,547	3,020	8,082	48,061	8,597	11,322	12,611	17,763	4,738	24,143	10,121	161,796	100.00%	7	1	8
Blank votes		70	74	35	86	516	103	110	135	199	58	282	111	1,779	1.09%			
Rejected votes – unregistered parties		0	0	0	0	4	0	2	1	5	2	4	0	18	0.01%			
Rejected votes – other		4	4	4	4	109	1	19	8	10	2	22	4	191	0.12%			
Total polled		7,865	5,625	3,059	8,172	48,690	8,701	11,453	12,755	17,977	4,800	24,451	10,236	163,784	85.68%			
Registered electors		9,059	6,678	3,740	9,962	56,273	10,110	12,798	15,087	20,952	5,502	29,041	11,955	191,157				
Turnout		86.82%	84.23%	81.79%	82.03%	86.52%	86.06%	89.49%	84.54%	85.80%	87.24%	84.19%	85.62%	85.68%				

The following candidates were elected:

- Constituency seats (personal mandates) - Lena Hallengren (S), 5,836 votes; 5,189 votes; Olle Olson (M), 1,895 votes; and Carl-Wiktor Svensson (KD), 953 votes.
- Constituency seats (party mandates) - Mattias Bäckström Johansson (SD), 232 votes; Marcus Fridlund (S), 601 votes; Marie Nicholson (M), 852 votes; and Johnny Svedin (SD), 104 votes.
- Levelling seats (personal mandates) - Emmy Ahlstedt (C), 1,058 votes.

===== 2022 =====
Results of the 2022 general election held on 11 September 2022:

Party		Votes per municipality												Total votes	%	Seats		
Party		Borg- holm	Emma- boda	Högsby	Hults- fred	Kalmar	Mönste- rås	Mörby- långa	Nybro	Oskars- hamn	Torsås	Väster- vik	Vimmer- by	Total votes	%	Con.	Lev.	Tot.
Swedish Social Democratic Party	S	2,169	1,922	1,017	2,841	14,874	2,763	3,244	4,148	5,516	1,256	8,349	3,080	51,179	31.74%	3	0	3
Sweden Democrats	SD	1,967	1,616	1,013	2,221	9,419	2,678	2,492	3,450	4,893	1,619	5,632	2,516	39,516	24.50%	2	0	2
Moderate Party	M	1,371	841	389	1,050	9,627	1,224	2,132	1,990	3,348	679	4,222	1,799	28,672	17.78%	2	0	2
Christian Democrats	KD	571	361	354	864	2,739	702	820	876	1,302	354	1,497	786	11,226	6.96%	1	0	1
Centre Party	C	673	398	254	620	3,013	549	836	796	740	337	1,484	823	10,523	6.53%	0	0	0
Left Party	V	290	251	130	389	2,556	313	453	596	782	180	1,082	462	7,484	4.64%	0	0	0
Green Party	MP	337	155	61	152	2,192	190	517	278	325	132	785	303	5,427	3.37%	0	0	0
Liberals	L	239	141	41	164	1,828	230	383	350	576	131	858	185	5,126	3.18%	0	0	0
Alternative for Sweden	AfS	21	16	13	38	141	30	24	43	30	21	60	27	464	0.29%	0	0	0
Nuance Party	PNy	2	8	9	40	47	1	2	45	45	5	47	55	306	0.19%	0	0	0
Citizens' Coalition	MED	14	8	3	5	84	8	16	14	44	6	50	9	261	0.16%	0	0	0
Pirate Party	PP	7	9	4	15	82	11	4	19	18	3	13	17	202	0.13%	0	0	0
Christian Values Party	KrVP	20	8	0	7	52	11	12	31	26	2	16	11	196	0.12%	0	0	0
The Push Buttons	Kn	6	7	3	15	35	8	8	15	21	9	15	15	157	0.10%	0	0	0
Human Rights and Democracy	MoD	5	6	5	1	33	12	8	7	4	6	20	4	111	0.07%	0	0	0
Socialist Welfare Party	S-V	0	0	0	1	0	0	0	0	0	0	96	9	106	0.07%	0	0	0
Independent Rural Party	LPo	3	4	0	5	6	4	1	1	5	2	26	12	69	0.04%	0	0	0
Feminist Initiative	FI	5	4	0	1	11	5	2	4	9	0	10	2	53	0.03%	0	0	0
Unity	ENH	6	4	3	1	12	0	1	2	6	0	9	1	45	0.03%	0	0	0
Direct Democrats	DD	2	1	3	1	11	5	2	5	1	1	6	3	41	0.03%	0	0	0
Climate Alliance	KA	3	1	0	1	9	3	2	2	3	5	5	0	34	0.02%	0	0	0
Communist Party of Sweden	SKP	0	0	0	6	10	2	0	0	0	0	0	0	18	0.01%	0	0	0
Nordic Resistance Movement	NMR	1	0	0	1	5	2	1	2	0	0	2	0	14	0.01%	0	0	0
Sweden Out of the EU/ Free Justice Party		0	1	0	4	0	2	0	0	1	0	0	0	8	0.00%	0	0	0
Classical Liberal Party	KLP	0	1	1	0	1	0	0	1	0	0	1	1	6	0.00%	0	0	0
Basic Income Party	BASIP	0	0	1	1	1	0	0	0	0	0	2	0	5	0.00%	0	0	0
Turning Point Party	PV	0	0	0	0	1	0	1	1	0	0	0	1	4	0.00%	0	0	0
Love		1	0	0	0	1	0	0	0	0	0	0	0	2	0.00%	0	0	0
Donald Duck Party		0	0	0	0	1	0	0	0	0	0	0	0	1	0.00%	0	0	0
Evil Chicken Party	OKP	0	0	0	0	1	0	0	0	0	0	0	0	1	0.00%	0	0	0
Free Choice		0	0	0	0	0	0	0	1	0	0	0	0	1	0.00%	0	0	0
Freedom Movement		0	0	0	0	0	0	0	0	0	0	0	1	1	0.00%	0	0	0
Freedom of the Family		0	0	0	0	0	0	0	1	0	0	0	0	1	0.00%	0	0	0
Green Democrats		0	0	0	0	0	0	0	0	0	0	1	0	1	0.00%	0	0	0
Hard Line Sweden		0	0	0	0	0	0	0	0	0	0	1	0	1	0.00%	0	0	0
National Law of Sweden		0	0	0	0	1	0	0	0	0	0	0	0	1	0.00%	0	0	0
Pax		0	0	0	1	0	0	0	0	0	0	0	0	1	0.00%	0	0	0
Political Shift		1	0	0	0	0	0	0	0	0	0	0	0	1	0.00%	0	0	0
Swexit Party		0	0	0	0	1	0	0	0	0	0	0	0	1	0.00%	0	0	0
Volt Sweden	Volt	1	0	0	0	0	0	0	0	0	0	0	0	1	0.00%	0	0	0
Valid votes		7,715	5,763	3,304	8,445	46,794	8,753	10,961	12,678	17,695	4,748	24,289	10,122	161,267	100.00%	8	0	8
Blank votes		83	77	37	73	500	93	91	137	217	56	286	152	1,802	1.10%			
Rejected votes – unregistered parties		4	2	1	2	11	2	2	2	0	2	6	1	35	0.02%			
Rejected votes – other		3	2	2	9	39	6	6	13	10	2	21	6	119	0.07%			
Total polled		7,805	5,844	3,344	8,529	47,344	8,854	11,060	12,830	17,922	4,808	24,602	10,281	163,223	86.01%			
Registered electors		8,990	6,884	3,988	10,283	54,430	10,143	12,229	15,131	20,862	5,526	29,293	12,022	189,781				
Turnout		86.82%	84.89%	83.85%	82.94%	86.98%	87.29%	90.44%	84.79%	85.91%	87.01%	83.99%	85.52%	86.01%				

The following candidates were elected:

- Constituency seats (personal mandates) - Lena Hallengren (S), 5,836 votes.
- Constituency seats (party mandates) - Mattias Bäckström Johansson (SD), 304 votes; Gudrun Brunegård (KD), 271 votes; Lars Engsund (M), 596 votes; Tomas Kronståhl (S), 557 votes; Laila Naraghi (S), 850 votes; Marie Nicholson (M), 903 votes; and Mona Olin (SD), 0 votes.

==== 2010s ====
===== 2018 =====
Results of the 2018 general election held on 9 September 2018:

Party		Votes per municipality												Total votes	%	Seats		
Party		Borg- holm	Emma- boda	Högsby	Hults- fred	Kalmar	Mönste- rås	Mörby- långa	Nybro	Oskars- hamn	Torsås	Väster- vik	Vimmer- by	Total votes	%	Con.	Lev.	Tot.
Swedish Social Democratic Party	S	1,823	1,985	1,103	2,911	13,853	2,840	2,813	4,158	5,763	1,354	8,431	3,144	50,178	31.19%	3	0	3
Sweden Democrats	SD	1,643	1,320	925	1,891	7,802	2,341	2,134	2,884	3,970	1,358	4,709	2,098	33,075	20.56%	2	0	2
Moderate Party	M	1,452	852	519	1,201	8,995	1,233	1,921	1,874	3,243	601	4,155	1,687	27,733	17.24%	1	0	1
Centre Party	C	1,090	676	339	920	4,200	893	1,163	1,296	1,080	566	2,154	1,397	15,774	9.81%	1	0	1
Christian Democrats	KD	641	362	262	812	2,988	578	759	952	1,468	348	1,555	858	11,583	7.20%	1	0	1
Left Party	V	435	342	183	510	3,061	473	613	753	1,055	209	1,637	580	9,851	6.12%	0	0	0
Liberals	L	263	145	53	159	2,240	273	406	367	835	135	954	208	6,038	3.75%	0	0	0
Green Party	MP	241	143	53	137	1,901	186	418	230	304	98	694	240	4,645	2.89%	0	0	0
Alternative for Sweden	AfS	12	29	7	45	138	35	24	62	43	10	76	27	508	0.32%	0	0	0
Feminist Initiative	FI	18	20	5	10	181	15	35	41	27	11	74	33	470	0.29%	0	0	0
Citizens' Coalition	MED	10	8	5	6	93	9	19	19	27	13	39	10	258	0.16%	0	0	0
Independent Rural Party	LPo	7	9	5	19	12	7	11	12	15	6	40	48	191	0.12%	0	0	0
Pirate Party	PP	13	5	3	14	35	11	6	6	4	1	7	13	118	0.07%	0	0	0
Unity	ENH	6	9	1	2	40	4	9	16	7	2	14	4	114	0.07%	0	0	0
Direct Democrats	DD	5	4	1	1	41	6	4	7	20	2	7	4	102	0.06%	0	0	0
Christian Values Party	KrVP	11	0	0	8	19	1	13	13	1	3	7	4	80	0.05%	0	0	0
Animal Party	DjuP	4	0	0	0	15	2	4	2	5	1	7	0	40	0.02%	0	0	0
Nordic Resistance Movement	NMR	1	4	0	7	9	2	2	2	2	1	7	0	37	0.02%	0	0	0
Classical Liberal Party	KLP	0	2	2	6	5	0	0	2	1	1	1	1	21	0.01%	0	0	0
Initiative	INI	6	2	0	0	7	1	2	0	0	0	0	0	18	0.01%	0	0	0
Security Party	TRP	0	0	0	0	1	0	9	0	0	0	0	0	10	0.01%	0	0	0
Basic Income Party	BASIP	1	0	0	1	2	0	0	0	0	1	2	0	7	0.00%	0	0	0
Communist Party of Sweden	SKP	0	0	0	0	3	0	1	0	0	0	1	0	5	0.00%	0	0	0
Parties not on the ballot		0	2		1	0	1	1	1	0	0	0	2	8	0.00%	0	0	0
Valid votes		7,682	5,919	3,466	8,661	45,641	8,911	10,367	12,697	17,870	4,721	24,571	10,358	160,864	100.00%	8	0	8
Blank votes		60	80	27	77	381	93	98	154	170	36	242	111	1,529	0.94%			
Rejected votes – unregistered parties		4	1	1	5	16	3	1	3	3	0	3	1	41	0.03%			
Rejected votes – other		4	0	2	2	15	4	4	3	5	0	13	4	56	0.03%			
Total polled		7,750	6,000	3,496	8,745	46,053	9,011	10,470	12,857	18,048	4,757	24,829	10,474	162,490	88.10%			
Registered electors		8,748	6,900	4,071	10,187	51,639	10,095	11,419	14,848	20,491	5,409	28,767	11,873	184,447				
Turnout		88.59%	86.96%	85.88%	85.84%	89.18%	89.26%	91.69%	86.59%	88.08%	87.95%	86.31%	88.22%	88.10%				

The following candidates were elected:

- Constituency seats (personal mandates) - Anders Åkesson (C), 1,323 votes; and Lena Hallengren (S), 3,584 votes.
- Constituency seats (party mandates) - Jan R. Andersson (M), 1,293 votes; Mattias Bäckström Johansson (SD), 314 votes; Tomas Kronståhl (S), 1,179 votes; Jimmy Loord (KD), 444, votes; Laila Naraghi (S), 1,951 votes; and Anne Oskarsson (SD), 92 votes.

Permanent substitutions:

- Jimmy Loord (KD) resigned on 31 March 2019 and was replaced by Gudrun Brunegård (KD) on 1 April 2019.

===== 2014 =====
Results of the 2014 general election held on 14 September 2014:

Party		Votes per municipality												Total votes	%	Seats		
Party		Borg- holm	Emma- boda	Högsby	Hults- fred	Kalmar	Mönste- rås	Mörby- långa	Nybro	Oskars- hamn	Torsås	Väster- vik	Vimmer- by	Total votes	%	Con.	Lev.	Tot.
Swedish Social Democratic Party	S	1,941	2,419	1,426	3,468	14,311	3,449	2,972	4,780	6,662	1,582	9,620	3,740	56,370	35.49%	3	0	3
Moderate Party	M	1,866	1,001	532	1,253	10,260	1,494	2,513	2,246	3,704	760	4,730	1,954	32,313	20.35%	2	0	2
Sweden Democrats	SD	1,160	924	721	1,542	5,744	1,620	1,536	2,232	2,866	982	3,333	1,600	24,260	15.27%	2	0	2
Centre Party	C	1,115	670	386	956	2,954	852	982	1,359	810	649	1,938	1,196	13,867	8.73%	1	0	1
Christian Democrats	KD	385	243	194	580	1,941	376	458	598	1,017	193	943	520	7,448	4.69%	0	0	0
Green Party	MP	340	238	82	237	3,035	270	561	438	584	152	1,099	399	7,435	4.68%	0	0	0
Left Party	V	279	278	150	362	1,974	396	380	694	864	150	1,258	450	7,235	4.56%	0	0	0
Liberal People's Party	FP	264	105	69	182	1,950	210	413	335	767	161	922	233	5,611	3.53%	0	0	0
Feminist Initiative	FI	174	96	41	95	1,162	103	262	163	223	62	431	142	2,954	1.86%	0	0	0
Pirate Party	PP	20	21	10	31	197	20	27	49	64	15	81	27	562	0.35%	0	0	0
Unity	ENH	15	10	10	16	56	7	10	8	16	6	28	19	201	0.13%	0	0	0
Party of the Swedes	SVP	8	12	2	19	47	20	2	13	9	3	9	7	151	0.10%	0	0	0
Independent Rural Party	LPo	5	1	2	10	5	1	3	3	13	1	25	19	88	0.06%	0	0	0
Animal Party	DjuP	1	0	0	1	15	2	1	3	1	0	50	4	78	0.05%	0	0	0
Christian Values Party	KrVP	4	1	0	3	12	3	3	21	5	2	6	1	61	0.04%	0	0	0
Swedish Senior Citizen Interest Party	SPI	0	2	0	0	0	0	0	51	0	2	0	0	55	0.03%	0	0	0
Direct Democrats	DD	5	2	1	1	11	2	0	1	1	1	5	0	30	0.02%	0	0	0
Communist Party of Sweden	SKP	0	0	0	0	11	0	0	0	0	0	0	1	12	0.01%	0	0	0
Classical Liberal Party	KLP	1	0	0	0	8	0	0	2	0	0	0	0	11	0.01%	0	0	0
Health Party		0	0	0	2	0	0	0	1	0	0	1	0	4	0.00%	0	0	0
Peace Democrats	FD	0	0	0	2	1	0	0	0	0	0	0	0	3	0.00%	0	0	0
Progressive Party		0	0	0	0	0	0	0	0	0	1	0	0	1	0.00%	0	0	0
Parties not on the ballot		4	5	2	7	17	5	4	4	9	5	8	2	72	0.05%	0	0	0
Valid votes		7,587	6,028	3,628	8,767	43,711	8,830	10,127	13,001	17,615	4,727	24,487	10,314	158,822	100.00%	8	0	8
Blank votes		82	66	28	76	409	90	91	144	204	46	238	114	1,588	0.99%			
Rejected votes – other		5	1	0	1	18	1	10	3	3	1	9	4	56	0.03%			
Total polled		7,674	6,095	3,656	8,844	44,138	8,921	10,228	13,148	17,822	4,774	24,734	10,432	160,466	86.71%			
Registered electors		8,825	7,096	4,266	10,521	50,384	10,194	11,329	15,362	20,583	5,483	28,966	12,043	185,052				
Turnout		86.96%	85.89%	85.70%	84.06%	87.60%	87.51%	90.28%	85.59%	86.59%	87.07%	85.39%	86.62%	86.71%				

The following candidates were elected:

- Constituency seats (personal mandates) - Anders Åkesson (C), 1,714 votes; Lena Hallengren (S), 3,824 votes; and Håkan Juholt (S), 5,240 votes.
- Constituency seats (party mandates) - Jan R. Andersson (M), 1,304 votes; Jörgen Andersson (M), 1,077 votes; Paula Bieler (SD), 23 votes; Krister Örnfjäder (S), 1,120 votes; and Christina Thuring (SD).

Permanent substitutions:

- Håkan Juholt (S) resigned on 11 September 2016 and was replaced by Laila Naraghi (S) on 12 September 2016.

===== 2010 =====
Results of the 2010 general election held on 19 September 2010:

Party		Votes per municipality												Total votes	%	Seats		
Party		Borg- holm	Emma- boda	Högsby	Hults- fred	Kalmar	Mönste- rås	Mörby- långa	Nybro	Oskars- hamn	Torsås	Väster- vik	Vimmer- by	Total votes	%	Con.	Lev.	Tot.
Swedish Social Democratic Party	S	1,709	2,443	1,494	3,436	13,778	3,442	2,671	4,956	6,400	1,562	9,642	3,583	55,116	35.62%	4	0	4
Moderate Party	M	2,329	1,431	768	1,819	12,430	2,014	2,962	3,141	4,770	1,163	6,230	2,574	41,631	26.90%	3	0	3
Centre Party	C	1,236	672	409	1,029	2,712	905	1,048	1,277	852	667	1,770	1,252	13,829	8.94%	1	0	1
Christian Democrats	KD	537	322	219	754	2,320	490	613	782	1,261	277	1,133	633	9,341	6.04%	0	1	1
Sweden Democrats	SD	380	349	271	537	2,267	572	561	739	1,074	330	1,246	638	8,964	5.79%	0	0	0
Green Party	MP	453	283	134	349	3,304	383	594	512	724	212	1,302	463	8,713	5.63%	0	0	0
Liberal People's Party	FP	364	183	122	326	2,592	372	548	467	984	167	1,327	395	7,847	5.07%	0	0	0
Left Party	V	261	317	156	476	2,007	474	405	782	974	176	1,229	422	7,679	4.96%	0	0	0
Pirate Party	PP	40	22	27	27	265	31	58	62	130	26	142	52	882	0.57%	0	0	0
Feminist Initiative	FI	23	10	10	27	89	16	26	20	36	5	99	16	377	0.24%	0	0	0
Swedish Senior Citizen Interest Party	SPI	2	3	0	4	19	0	0	79	2	0	0	0	109	0.07%	0	0	0
Party of the Swedes	SVP	0	22	0	3	46	26	2	2	0	2	0	0	103	0.07%	0	0	0
National Democrats	ND	0	1	0	7	1	0	0	4	1	1	2	23	40	0.03%	0	0	0
Unity	ENH	1	2	1	0	6	0	2	1	3	0	3	1	20	0.01%	0	0	0
Communist Party of Sweden	SKP	0	1	0	0	8	0	0	7	0	0	0	0	16	0.01%	0	0	0
Classical Liberal Party	KLP	3	0	2	1	3	0	0	0	0	1	0	0	10	0.01%	0	0	0
Freedom Party		0	0	1	0	3	0	0	2	1	0	3	0	10	0.01%	0	0	0
Rural Democrats		0	1	0	0	0	0	0	1	0	0	0	4	6	0.00%	0	0	0
Socialist Justice Party	RS	0	0	0	0	0	0	0	0	0	0	2	1	3	0.00%	0	0	0
European Workers Party	EAP	0	0	0	0	0	0	0	0	0	0	1	0	1	0.00%	0	0	0
Norrländska Coalition	NorrS	0	0	0	0	1	0	0	0	0	0	0	0	1	0.00%	0	0	0
Republicans		0	0	0	0	0	0	0	0	1	0	0	0	1	0.00%	0	0	0
Parties not on the ballot		2	5	0	2	12	4	0	1	2	0	6	3	37	0.02%	0	0	0
Valid votes		7,340	6,067	3,614	8,797	41,863	8,729	9,490	12,835	17,215	4,589	24,137	10,060	154,736	100.00%	8	1	9
Blank votes		100	85	51	120	549	103	134	204	239	56	330	168	2,139	1.36%			
Rejected votes – other		0	0	2	5	22	5	3	4	4	2	4	3	54	0.03%			
Total polled		7,440	6,152	3,667	8,922	42,434	8,837	9,627	13,043	17,458	4,647	24,471	10,231	156,929	84.95%			
Registered electors		8,840	7,244	4,417	10,788	49,178	10,326	10,958	15,529	20,619	5,509	29,227	12,102	184,737				
Turnout		84.16%	84.93%	83.02%	82.70%	86.29%	85.58%	87.85%	83.99%	84.67%	84.35%	83.73%	84.54%	84.95%				

The following candidates were elected:

- Constituency seats (personal mandates) - Anders Åkesson (C), 1,562 votes; and Håkan Juholt (S), 5,220 votes.
- Constituency seats (party mandates) - Jan R. Andersson (M), 2,254 votes; Jörgen Andersson (M), 459 votes; Eva Bengtson Skogsberg (M), 1,066 votes; Lena Hallengren (S), 2,574 votes; Désirée Liljevall (S), 710 votes; and Krister Örnfjäder (S), 1,438 votes.
- Levelling seats (personal mandates) - Anders Andersson (KD), 1,241 votes.

==== 2000s ====
===== 2006 =====
Results of the 2006 general election held on 17 September 2006:

Party		Votes per municipality												Total votes	%	Seats		
Party		Borg- holm	Emma- boda	Högsby	Hults- fred	Kalmar	Mönste- rås	Mörby- långa	Nybro	Oskars- hamn	Torsås	Väster- vik	Vimmer- by	Total votes	%	Con.	Lev.	Tot.
Swedish Social Democratic Party	S	1,938	2,647	1,634	3,794	15,584	3,812	3,055	5,505	7,273	1,663	10,347	3,755	61,007	41.35%	4	0	4
Moderate Party	M	1,892	1,032	579	1,394	9,785	1,427	2,210	2,355	3,482	920	4,586	1,768	31,430	21.30%	2	0	2
Centre Party	C	1,555	812	539	1,218	2,982	1,015	1,166	1,493	990	787	2,116	1,633	16,306	11.05%	1	0	1
Christian Democrats	KD	580	451	259	700	2,575	556	626	865	1,389	400	1,328	784	10,513	7.13%	1	0	1
Liberal People's Party	FP	325	163	153	325	2,596	346	529	452	797	169	1,438	387	7,680	5.21%	0	0	0
Left Party	V	276	238	187	496	1,878	432	361	656	1,114	139	1,258	391	7,426	5.03%	0	0	0
Green Party	MP	287	205	77	247	2,053	231	371	334	461	143	950	328	5,687	3.85%	0	0	0
Sweden Democrats	SD	250	185	190	318	1,176	303	265	376	665	179	478	290	4,675	3.17%	0	0	0
Pirate Party	PP	26	35	10	44	224	22	54	87	136	26	86	58	808	0.55%	0	0	0
June List		23	34	5	57	146	30	49	50	40	29	104	39	606	0.41%	0	0	0
Feminist Initiative	FI	41	20	14	17	198	17	50	34	47	17	90	26	571	0.39%	0	0	0
Swedish Senior Citizen Interest Party	SPI	21	6	6	13	89	12	8	195	22	14	32	16	434	0.29%	0	0	0
National Socialist Front		2	11	0	17	52	23	2	7	2	1	2	5	124	0.08%	0	0	0
Unity	ENH	4	1	3	5	23	5	6	3	2	1	8	5	66	0.04%	0	0	0
People's Will		3	8	1	5	15	5	0	12	1	6	6	3	65	0.04%	0	0	0
Health Care Party	Sjvåp	0	0	0	5	1	1	0	6	2	0	8	6	29	0.02%	0	0	0
Kvinnokraft		1	1	0	0	14	4	2	0	0	0	0	2	24	0.02%	0	0	0
New Future	NYF	0	0	0	1	8	4	0	0	2	0	5	0	20	0.01%	0	0	0
National Democrats	ND	1	1	0	3	3	1	1	0	2	0	3	3	18	0.01%	0	0	0
Partiet.se		0	0	1	0	6	0	0	0	0	0	1	0	8	0.01%	0	0	0
Classical Liberal Party	KLP	1	0	0	0	4	0	0	0	0	0	0	0	5	0.00%	0	0	0
The Communists	KOMM	0	1	0	0	2	0	0	0	1	0	0	0	4	0.00%	0	0	0
Socialist Justice Party	RS	0	0	0	0	0	0	0	1	0	0	0	0	1	0.00%	0	0	0
Unique Party		0	0	0	0	1	0	0	0	0	0	0	0	1	0.00%	0	0	0
Other parties		4	0	0	3	13	1	2	0	0	0	0	0	23	0.02%	0	0	0
Valid votes		7,230	5,851	3,658	8,662	39,428	8,247	8,757	12,431	16,428	4,494	22,846	9,499	147,531	100.00%	8	0	8
Blank votes		110	143	59	184	724	143	161	231	362	93	394	233	2,837	1.89%			
Rejected votes – other		1	4	3	1	14	4	2	3	4	1	11	2	50	0.03%			
Total polled		7,341	5,998	3,720	8,847	40,166	8,394	8,920	12,665	16,794	4,588	23,251	9,734	150,418	82.22%			
Registered electors		9,020	7,310	4,608	11,093	47,801	10,173	10,438	15,452	20,486	5,633	28,927	12,004	182,945				
Turnout		81.39%	82.05%	80.73%	79.75%	84.03%	82.51%	85.46%	81.96%	81.98%	81.45%	80.38%	81.09%	82.22%				

The following candidates were elected:

- Constituency seats (personal mandates) - Anders Åkesson (C), 1,716 votes; and Chatrine Pålsson Ahlgren (KD), 1,276 votes.
- Constituency seats (party mandates) - Jan R. Andersson (M), 1,241 votes; Eva Bengtson Skogsberg (M), 600 votes; Lena Hallengren (S), 2,027 votes; Håkan Juholt (S), 4,835 votes; Désirée Liljevall (S), 763 votes; and Krister Örnfjäder (S), 1,537 votes.

Permanent substitutions:

- Chatrine Pålsson Ahlgren (KD) resigned on 31 October 2009 and was replaced by Anders Andersson (KD) on 1 November 2009.

===== 2002 =====
Results of the 2002 general election held on 15 September 2002:

Party		Votes per municipality												Total votes	%	Seats		
Party		Borg- holm	Emma- boda	Högsby	Hults- fred	Kalmar	Mönste- rås	Mörby- långa	Nybro	Oskars- hamn	Torsås	Väster- vik	Vimmer- by	Total votes	%	Con.	Lev.	Tot.
Swedish Social Democratic Party	S	2,020	3,008	1,778	4,113	16,110	3,862	3,171	5,674	7,702	1,748	10,064	3,839	63,089	43.74%	4	0	4
Moderate Party	M	1,127	585	370	812	5,767	837	1,290	1,305	2,026	587	2,602	1,023	18,331	12.71%	1	0	1
Christian Democrats	KD	1,022	593	550	1,092	3,702	827	1,013	1,329	2,209	576	2,018	1,181	16,112	11.17%	1	0	1
Centre Party	C	1,501	793	495	1,251	2,298	928	1,108	1,404	848	861	2,169	1,704	15,360	10.65%	1	0	1
Liberal People's Party	FP	614	328	203	484	4,279	563	879	845	1,338	293	2,446	593	12,865	8.92%	1	0	1
Left Party	V	403	345	316	726	2,663	642	535	918	1,316	200	1,891	564	10,519	7.29%	0	1	1
Green Party	MP	281	200	90	207	1,772	235	325	283	490	156	870	301	5,210	3.61%	0	0	0
Sweden Democrats	SD	33	45	32	164	265	71	50	62	156	27	177	75	1,157	0.80%	0	0	0
Swedish Senior Citizen Interest Party	SPI	32	51	9	18	531	24	24	268	38	17	31	12	1,055	0.73%	0	0	0
New Future	NYF	10	0	0	1	9	23	0	2	6	0	34	0	85	0.06%	0	0	0
Unity	ENH	0	4	3	0	15	1	1	0	1	0	2	4	31	0.02%	0	0	0
The Party of Love	POL	0	2	0	0	1	0	0	3	0	2	0	0	8	0.01%	0	0	0
Socialist Party	SOC.P	0	4	0	0	0	0	0	1	1	0	0	0	6	0.00%	0	0	0
Norrbotten Party	NBP	0	0	0	2	2	0	0	0	0	0	1	0	5	0.00%	0	0	0
The Communists	KOMM	0	1	0	0	2	0	0	0	0	0	0	0	3	0.00%	0	0	0
Socialist Justice Party	RS	1	0	0	0	0	0	1	0	0	0	0	0	2	0.00%	0	0	0
European Workers Party	EAP	0	0	0	0	1	0	0	0	0	0	0	0	1	0.00%	0	0	0
Rikshushållarna		0	0	0	0	1	0	0	0	0	0	0	0	1	0.00%	0	0	0
Other parties		14	13	8	23	111	66	13	42	29	7	44	18	388	0.27%	0	0	0
Valid votes		7,058	5,972	3,854	8,893	37,529	8,079	8,410	12,136	16,160	4,474	22,349	9,314	144,228	100.00%	8	1	9
Rejected votes		83	104	35	135	679	116	109	234	258	56	353	172	2,334	1.59%			
Total polled		7,141	6,076	3,889	9,028	38,208	8,195	8,519	12,370	16,418	4,530	22,702	9,486	146,562	80.62%			
Registered electors		8,932	7,437	4,765	11,339	46,420	10,067	10,628	15,349	20,350	5,705	28,862	11,950	181,804				
Turnout		79.95%	81.70%	81.62%	79.62%	82.31%	81.40%	80.16%	80.59%	80.68%	79.40%	78.66%	79.38%	80.62%				

The following candidates were elected:

- Constituency seats (personal mandates) - Nils Fredrik Aurelius (M), 1,536 votes; Agne Hansson (C), 2,397 votes; and Håkan Juholt (S), 5,376 votes.
- Constituency seats (party mandates) - Ann-Marie Fagerström (S), 2,173 votes; Krister Örnfjäder (S), 2,206 votes; Chatrine Pålsson (KD), 884 votes; Agneta Ringman (S), 969 votes; and Sverker Thorén (FP), 1,011 votes.
- Levelling seats (personal mandates) - Lennart Beijer (V), 1,296 votes.

==== 1990s ====
===== 1998 =====
Results of the 1998 general election held on 20 September 1998:

Party		Votes per municipality												Total votes	%	Seats		
Party		Borg- holm	Emma- boda	Högsby	Hults- fred	Kalmar	Mönste- rås	Mörby- långa	Nybro	Oskars- hamn	Torsås	Väster- vik	Vimmer- by	Total votes	%	Con.	Lev.	Tot.
Swedish Social Democratic Party	S	1,806	2,731	1,600	3,939	13,811	3,449	2,696	5,366	6,998	1,553	9,838	3,488	57,275	39.36%	4	0	4
Moderate Party	M	1,523	904	552	1,310	8,252	1,211	1,784	2,032	2,822	854	3,821	1,586	26,651	18.32%	2	0	2
Christian Democrats	KD	1,279	703	590	1,284	4,502	995	1,293	1,528	2,508	692	2,688	1,346	19,408	13.34%	1	0	1
Left Party	V	595	636	561	1,214	4,015	1,006	784	1,377	2,220	349	3,014	971	16,742	11.51%	1	0	1
Centre Party	C	1,240	728	431	1,164	1,937	897	958	1,238	775	779	1,770	1,492	13,409	9.22%	1	0	1
Green Party	MP	282	215	117	209	1,753	271	397	363	508	208	1,050	296	5,669	3.90%	0	0	0
Liberal People's Party	FP	191	131	76	171	1,360	157	255	225	492	113	777	168	4,116	2.83%	0	0	0
Other parties		109	95	31	129	725	120	136	131	233	55	289	179	2,232	1.53%	0	0	0
Valid votes		7,025	6,143	3,958	9,420	36,355	8,106	8,303	12,260	16,556	4,603	23,247	9,526	145,502	100.00%	9	0	9
Rejected votes		100	166	76	210	977	170	189	292	410	91	478	293	3,452	2.32%			
Total polled		7,125	6,309	4,034	9,630	37,332	8,276	8,492	12,552	16,966	4,694	23,725	9,819	148,954	81.56%			
Registered electors		8,927	7,640	4,994	11,849	45,153	10,113	10,173	15,500	20,665	5,820	29,701	12,096	182,631				
Turnout		79.81%	82.58%	80.78%	81.27%	82.68%	81.84%	83.48%	80.98%	82.10%	80.65%	79.88%	81.18%	81.56%				

The following candidates were elected:

- Constituency seats (personal mandates) - Nils Fredrik Aurelius (M), 2,168 votes; and Agne Hansson (C), 2,271 votes.
- Constituency seats (party mandates) - Lennart Beijer (V), 1,220 votes; Leif Carlson (M), 934 votes; Ann-Marie Fagerström (S), 1,053 votes; Håkan Juholt (S), 3,591 votes; Krister Örnfjäder (S), 1,566 votes; Chatrine Pålsson (KD), 1,133 votes; and Agneta Ringman (S), 1,231 votes.

===== 1994 =====
Results of the 1994 general election held on 18 September 1994:

Party		Votes per municipality												Total votes	%	Seats		
Party		Borg- holm	Emma- boda	Högsby	Hults- fred	Kalmar	Mönste- rås	Mörby- långa	Nybro	Oskars- hamn	Torsås	Väster- vik	Vimmer- by	Total votes	%	Con.	Lev.	Tot.
Swedish Social Democratic Party	S	2,551	3,490	2,190	5,301	17,751	4,577	3,565	6,802	9,407	2,055	13,219	4,471	75,379	47.58%	5	0	5
Moderate Party	M	1,728	1,037	692	1,584	8,885	1,373	1,968	2,322	3,304	953	4,383	1,815	30,044	18.96%	2	0	2
Centre Party	C	1,839	1,165	718	1,784	2,978	1,285	1,511	1,918	1,310	1,126	2,721	2,204	20,559	12.98%	2	0	2
Left Party	V	276	298	269	710	2,046	534	374	777	1,092	153	1,771	505	8,805	5.56%	0	1	1
Liberal People's Party	FP	283	243	116	329	2,243	278	460	438	848	166	1,214	292	6,910	4.36%	0	0	0
Green Party	MP	410	321	164	288	1,876	320	452	497	653	257	1,205	448	6,891	4.35%	0	0	0
Christian Democratic Unity	KDS	402	253	245	603	1,417	356	304	610	1,011	280	863	536	6,880	4.34%	0	1	1
New Democracy	NyD	98	70	39	116	512	108	137	176	213	101	264	167	2,001	1.26%	0	0	0
Other parties		66	25	40	49	288	36	71	79	37	24	142	98	955	0.60%	0	0	0
Valid votes		7,653	6,902	4,473	10,764	37,996	8,867	8,842	13,619	17,875	5,115	25,782	10,536	158,424	100.00%	9	2	11
Rejected votes		86	100	63	149	614	116	114	216	317	70	314	184	2,343	1.46%			
Total polled		7,739	7,002	4,536	10,913	38,610	8,983	8,956	13,835	18,192	5,185	26,096	10,720	160,767	87.20%			
Registered electors		9,033	7,996	5,252	12,560	44,020	10,131	10,208	15,847	20,740	6,045	30,257	12,286	184,375				
Turnout		85.67%	87.57%	86.37%	86.89%	87.71%	88.67%	87.74%	87.30%	87.71%	85.77%	86.25%	87.25%	87.20%				

The following candidates were elected: Nils Fredrik Aurelius (M); Lennart Beijer (V); Leif Carlson (M); Sivert Carlsson (C); Ann-Marie Fagerström (S); Agne Hansson (C); Håkan Juholt (S); Bengt Kronblad (S); Krister Örnfjäder (S); Chatrine Pålsson (KDS); and Agneta Ringman (S).

===== 1991 =====
Results of the 1991 general election held on 15 September 1991:

Party		Votes per municipality												Total votes	%	Seats		
Party		Borg- holm	Emma- boda	Högsby	Hults- fred	Kalmar	Mönste- rås	Mörby- långa	Nybro	Oskars- hamn	Torsås	Väster- vik	Vimmer- by	Total votes	%	Con.	Lev.	Tot.
Swedish Social Democratic Party	S	1,855	3,104	1,902	4,609	14,686	3,737	2,797	5,863	7,803	1,628	11,117	3,591	62,692	39.57%	4	0	4
Moderate Party	M	1,500	983	631	1,578	8,526	1,291	1,863	2,223	3,213	866	4,409	1,822	28,905	18.24%	2	0	2
Centre Party	C	2,143	1,283	841	1,893	3,343	1,298	1,692	2,169	1,463	1,253	3,015	2,446	22,839	14.41%	1	1	2
Christian Democratic Unity	KDS	679	469	438	1,096	2,650	717	566	1,088	1,763	508	1,590	885	12,449	7.86%	1	0	1
New Democracy	NyD	567	426	339	578	2,585	643	772	980	1,206	390	1,793	700	10,979	6.93%	1	0	1
Liberal People's Party	FP	312	327	159	537	2,843	384	565	625	1,138	219	1,719	441	9,269	5.85%	0	1	1
Left Party	V	173	231	237	459	1,313	416	230	490	817	88	1,361	284	6,099	3.85%	0	0	0
Green Party	MP	272	213	93	176	1,258	190	267	280	423	110	785	230	4,297	2.71%	0	0	0
Other parties		35	36	36	38	275	54	60	68	156	36	70	52	916	0.58%	0	0	0
Valid votes		7,536	7,072	4,676	10,964	37,479	8,730	8,812	13,786	17,982	5,098	25,859	10,451	158,445	100.00%	9	2	11
Rejected votes		84	134	62	145	650	118	102	219	291	63	419	198	2,485	1.54%			
Total polled		7,620	7,206	4,738	11,109	38,129	8,848	8,914	14,005	18,273	5,161	26,278	10,649	160,930	87.19%			
Registered electors		8,865	8,171	5,440	12,855	43,427	10,109	10,027	15,989	20,817	6,044	30,615	12,221	184,580				
Turnout		85.96%	88.19%	87.10%	86.42%	87.80%	87.53%	88.90%	87.59%	87.78%	85.39%	85.83%	87.14%	87.19%				

The following candidates were elected: Stig Alemyr (S); Leif Carlson (M); Bertil Danielsson (M); Agne Hansson (C); Marianne Jönsson (C); Bengt Kronblad (S); Christer Lindblom (FP); Lena Öhrsvik (S); Chatrine Pålsson (KDS); Birger Rosqvist (S); and Christer Windén (NyD).

Permanent substitutions:

- Birger Rosqvist (S) died on 22 January 1993 and was replaced by Krister Örnfjäder (S) on 26 January 1993.

==== 1980s ====
===== 1988 =====
Results of the 1988 general election held on 18 September 1988:

Party		Votes per municipality												Total votes	%	Seats		
Party		Borg- holm	Emma- boda	Högsby	Hults- fred	Kalmar	Mönste- rås	Mörby- långa	Nybro	Oskars- hamn	Torsås	Väster- vik	Vimmer- by	Total votes	%	Con.	Lev.	Tot.
Swedish Social Democratic Party	S	2,147	3,444	2,195	5,153	16,706	4,210	3,140	6,514	8,866	1,906	12,718	4,093	71,092	45.38%	4	1	5
Centre Party	C	2,497	1,644	1,071	2,325	4,292	1,641	2,042	2,738	1,964	1,565	3,655	2,927	28,361	18.10%	2	0	2
Moderate Party	M	1,216	840	612	1,477	7,153	1,158	1,580	1,828	2,784	745	3,843	1,603	24,839	15.85%	2	0	2
Liberal People's Party	FP	543	437	301	707	3,728	535	739	963	1,597	336	2,151	647	12,684	8.10%	1	0	1
Left Party – Communists	VPK	188	270	250	453	1,656	471	222	610	966	92	1,553	341	7,072	4.51%	0	0	0
Green Party	MP	449	332	194	366	1,767	335	362	503	669	235	1,166	414	6,792	4.34%	0	0	0
Christian Democratic Unity	KDS	363	203	235	549	1,033	329	181	514	951	227	607	357	5,549	3.54%	0	0	0
Other parties		5	23	4	14	99	3	32	34	22	10	20	12	278	0.18%	0	0	0
Valid votes		7,408	7,193	4,862	11,044	36,434	8,682	8,298	13,704	17,819	5,116	25,713	10,394	156,667	100.00%	9	1	10
Rejected votes		77	78	53	115	428	72	72	145	232	43	279	115	1,709	1.08%			
Total polled		7,485	7,271	4,915	11,159	36,862	8,754	8,370	13,849	18,051	5,159	25,992	10,509	158,376	86.58%			
Registered electors		8,695	8,177	5,620	12,922	42,757	9,942	9,545	15,914	20,793	5,960	30,474	12,117	182,916				
Turnout		86.08%	88.92%	87.46%	86.36%	86.21%	88.05%	87.69%	87.02%	86.81%	86.56%	85.29%	86.73%	86.58%				

The following candidates were elected: Stig Alemyr (S); Arne Andersson (S); Bertil Danielsson (M); Agne Hansson (C); Ingrid Hasselström Nyvall (FP); Marianne Jönsson (C); Bengt Kronblad (S); Ewy Möller (M); Lena Öhrsvik (S); and Birger Rosqvist (S).

Permanent substitutions:

- Ewy Möller (M) died on 23 January 1991 and was replaced by Nils Fredrik Aurelius (M) on 25 January 1991.

===== 1985 =====
Results of the 1985 general election held on 15 September 1985:

Party		Votes per municipality												Total votes	%	Seats		
Party		Borg- holm	Emma- boda	Högsby	Hults- fred	Kalmar	Mönste- rås	Mörby- långa	Nybro	Oskars- hamn	Torsås	Väster- vik	Vimmer- by	Total votes	%	Con.	Lev.	Tot.
Swedish Social Democratic Party	S	2,182	3,549	2,469	5,476	17,372	4,565	3,093	6,871	9,453	1,929	14,180	4,159	75,298	45.97%	4	1	5
Moderate Party	M	1,707	1,085	831	1,917	9,127	1,562	2,048	2,455	3,527	1,064	4,957	2,084	32,364	19.76%	2	0	2
Centre Party	C	2,746	1,810	1,316	2,945	4,332	1,578	2,054	3,115	2,547	1,778	4,031	3,247	31,499	19.23%	2	0	2
Liberal People's Party	FP	763	588	383	947	4,365	717	966	1,243	2,087	463	2,537	942	16,001	9.77%	1	0	1
Left Party – Communists	VPK	164	235	231	448	1,451	415	184	551	817	88	1,355	324	6,263	3.82%	0	0	0
Green Party	MP	135	121	52	79	626	128	107	114	202	39	394	105	2,102	1.28%	0	0	0
Other parties		17	10	5	13	71	18	11	21	40	11	45	19	281	0.17%	0	0	0
Valid votes		7,714	7,398	5,287	11,825	37,344	8,983	8,463	14,370	18,673	5,372	27,499	10,880	163,808	100.00%	9	1	10
Rejected votes		38	75	20	93	342	73	59	149	153	33	203	124	1,362	0.82%			
Total polled		7,752	7,473	5,307	11,918	37,686	9,056	8,522	14,519	18,826	5,405	27,702	11,004	165,170	89.95%			
Registered electors		8,710	8,297	5,853	13,204	42,000	10,014	9,396	16,053	20,916	6,021	30,963	12,203	183,630				
Turnout		89.00%	90.07%	90.67%	90.26%	89.73%	90.43%	90.70%	90.44%	90.01%	89.77%	89.47%	90.17%	89.95%				

The following candidates were elected: Stig Alemyr (S); Arne Andersson (S); Gösta Andersson (C); Bertil Danielsson (M); Agne Hansson (C); Ingrid Hasselström Nyvall (FP); Bengt Kronblad (S); Ewy Möller (M); Lena Öhrsvik (S); and Birger Rosqvist (S).

===== 1982 =====
Results of the 1982 general election held on 19 September 1982:

Party		Votes per municipality												Total votes	%	Seats		
Party		Borg- holm	Emma- boda	Högsby	Hults- fred	Kalmar	Mönste- rås	Mörby- långa	Nybro	Oskars- hamn	Torsås	Väster- vik	Vimmer- by	Total votes	%	Con.	Lev.	Tot.
Swedish Social Democratic Party	S	2,172	3,650	2,697	5,618	17,271	4,626	3,148	6,940	9,618	1,931	14,613	4,243	76,527	46.13%	5	0	5
Centre Party	C	3,060	2,105	1,293	3,055	5,523	1,737	2,307	3,563	2,958	1,945	4,717	3,719	35,982	21.69%	2	0	2
Moderate Party	M	1,757	1,161	912	2,214	9,741	1,544	2,221	2,610	3,675	1,109	5,297	2,239	34,480	20.79%	2	0	2
Liberal People's Party	FP	257	217	186	450	1,779	293	417	454	928	250	947	303	6,481	3.91%	0	0	0
Left Party – Communists	VPK	200	257	217	442	1,470	455	179	611	789	86	1,287	309	6,302	3.80%	0	0	0
Christian Democratic Unity	KDS	250	132	211	447	606	304	101	385	490	157	559	165	3,807	2.30%	0	0	0
Green Party	MP	97	110	52	94	582	94	111	142	204	65	478	122	2,151	1.30%	0	0	0
K-Party	K-P	0	1	2	0	6	4	0	3	0	0	8	0	24	0.01%	0	0	0
Other parties		5	1	1	7	34	4	4	4	8	14	17	28	127	0.08%	0	0	0
Valid votes		7,798	7,634	5,571	12,327	37,012	9,061	8,488	14,712	18,670	5,557	27,923	11,128	165,881	100.00%	9	0	9
Rejected votes		41	81	34	106	409	56	59	124	165	31	218	117	1,441	0.86%			
Total polled		7,839	7,715	5,605	12,433	37,421	9,117	8,547	14,836	18,835	5,588	28,141	11,245	167,322	91.74%			
Registered electors		8,640	8,315	6,059	13,466	40,949	9,903	9,269	16,070	20,492	6,072	30,994	12,155	182,384				
Turnout		90.73%	92.78%	92.51%	92.33%	91.38%	92.06%	92.21%	92.32%	91.91%	92.03%	90.79%	92.51%	91.74%				

The following candidates were elected: Stig Alemyr (S); Arne Andersson (S); Gösta Andersson (C); Bertil Danielsson (M); Agne Hansson (C); Bengt Kronblad (S); Ewy Möller (M); Lena Öhrsvik (S); and Birger Rosqvist (S).

==== 1970s ====
===== 1979 =====
Results of the 1979 general election held on 16 September 1979:

Party		Votes per municipality												Total votes	%	Seats		
Party		Borg- holm	Emma- boda	Högsby	Hults- fred	Kalmar	Mönste- rås	Mörby- långa	Nybro	Oskars- hamn	Torsås	Väster- vik	Vimmer- by	Total votes	%	Con.	Lev.	Tot.
Swedish Social Democratic Party	S	1,975	3,470	2,530	5,465	16,149	4,395	2,888	6,700	9,325	1,822	13,856	3,974	72,549	44.11%	4	1	5
Centre Party	C	3,439	2,282	1,442	3,294	5,903	1,874	2,511	3,891	3,127	2,005	5,509	4,161	39,438	23.98%	2	0	2
Moderate Party	M	1,354	1,075	935	2,090	8,601	1,416	1,944	2,359	3,232	1,101	4,584	1,959	30,650	18.64%	2	0	2
Liberal People's Party	FP	393	411	293	806	3,407	498	700	869	1,687	346	1,828	499	11,737	7.14%	1	0	1
Left Party – Communists	VPK	248	262	237	418	1,625	445	223	650	669	63	1,360	313	6,513	3.96%	0	0	0
Christian Democratic Unity	KDS	190	111	171	354	449	234	64	312	409	136	462	177	3,069	1.87%	0	0	0
Communist Party of Sweden	SKP	0	10	1	3	86	0	1	1	48	2	30	2	184	0.11%	0	0	0
Workers' Party – The Communists	APK	0	0	3	0	4	18	0	8	0	0	3	0	36	0.02%	0	0	0
Other parties		15	9	6	16	68	9	10	21	19	3	93	12	281	0.17%	0	0	0
Valid votes		7,614	7,630	5,618	12,446	36,292	8,889	8,341	14,811	18,516	5,478	27,725	11,097	164,457	100.00%	9	1	10
Rejected votes		19	37	12	50	164	23	50	53	83	17	111	62	681	0.41%			
Total polled		7,633	7,667	5,630	12,496	36,456	8,912	8,391	14,864	18,599	5,495	27,836	11,159	165,138	91.35%			
Registered electors		8,477	8,280	6,066	13,567	40,125	9,719	9,088	16,113	20,309	6,011	30,894	12,135	180,784				
Turnout		90.04%	92.60%	92.81%	92.11%	90.86%	91.70%	92.33%	92.25%	91.58%	91.42%	90.10%	91.96%	91.35%				

The following candidates were elected: Stig Alemyr (S); Arne Andersson (S); Gösta Andersson (C); Bertil Danielsson (M); Eric Krönmark (M); Bernt Nilsson (S); Lena Öhrsvik (S); Eric Rejdnell (FP); Birger Rosqvist (S); and Ivan Svanström (C).

Permanent substitutions:

- Eric Krönmark (M) resigned on 30 November 1981 and was replaced by Ewy Möller (M) on 1 December 1981.

===== 1976 =====
Results of the 1976 general election held on 19 September 1976:

Party		Votes per municipality												Total votes	%	Seats		
Party		Borg- holm	Emma- boda	Högsby	Hults- fred	Kalmar	Mönste- rås	Mörby- långa	Nybro	Oskars- hamn	Torsås	Väster- vik	Vimmer- by	Total votes	%	Con.	Lev.	Tot.
Swedish Social Democratic Party	S	1,953	3,549	2,501	5,464	16,026	4,261	2,788	6,702	9,229	1,663	13,521	3,832	71,489	43.33%	4	1	5
Centre Party	C	3,797	2,688	1,762	3,955	8,361	2,297	2,836	4,575	4,189	2,302	7,282	4,816	48,860	29.62%	3	0	3
Moderate Party	M	1,079	812	754	1,765	6,845	1,192	1,470	1,878	2,516	903	3,968	1,661	24,843	15.06%	2	0	2
People's Party	F	391	331	270	762	3,289	418	622	781	1,649	333	1,683	530	11,059	6.70%	0	1	1
Left Party – Communists	VPK	190	203	180	329	1,199	401	145	563	623	42	1,241	235	5,351	3.24%	0	0	0
Christian Democratic Unity	KDS	165	129	172	358	452	253	47	294	496	151	458	152	3,127	1.90%	0	0	0
Communist Party of Sweden	SKP	6	34	1	7	76	1	6	10	38	1	18	6	204	0.12%	0	0	0
Other parties		0	0	0	0	24	0	1	2	6	2	5	2	42	0.03%	0	0	0
Valid votes		7,581	7,746	5,640	12,640	36,272	8,823	7,915	14,805	18,746	5,397	28,176	11,234	164,975	100.00%	9	2	11
Rejected votes		20	35	6	22	78	14	11	51	38	8	86	32	401	0.24%			
Total polled		7,601	7,781	5,646	12,662	36,350	8,837	7,926	14,856	18,784	5,405	28,262	11,266	165,376	92.29%			
Registered electors		8,281	8,304	6,046	13,654	39,550	9,565	8,555	15,958	20,351	5,909	30,935	12,081	179,189				
Turnout		91.79%	93.70%	93.38%	92.73%	91.91%	92.39%	92.65%	93.09%	92.30%	91.47%	91.36%	93.25%	92.29%				

The following candidates were elected: Stig Alemyr (S); Arne Andersson (S); Gösta Andersson (C); Fritz Börjesson (C); Eric Krönmark (M); Bernt Nilsson (S); Lena Öhrsvik (S); Eric Rejdnell (F); Birger Rosqvist (S); Lars Schött (M); and Ivan Svanström (C).

===== 1973 =====
Results of the 1973 general election held on 16 September 1973:

Party		Votes per municipality												Total votes	%	Seats		
Party		Borg- holm	Emma- boda	Högsby	Hults- fred	Kalmar	Mönste- rås	Mörby- långa	Nybro	Oskars- hamn	Torsås	Väster- vik	Vimmer- by	Total votes	%	Con.	Lev.	Tot.
Swedish Social Democratic Party	S	1,823	3,394	2,500	5,232	15,804	4,072	2,355	6,425	8,782	1,614	13,153	3,774	68,928	43.87%	5	0	5
Centre Party	C	3,549	2,611	1,706	3,858	8,093	2,213	2,690	4,468	4,029	2,230	6,938	4,637	47,022	29.93%	3	0	3
Moderate Party	M	968	751	747	1,651	6,308	1,088	1,154	1,748	2,246	778	3,493	1,522	22,454	14.29%	1	1	2
People's Party	F	345	305	248	669	2,410	371	465	549	1,173	253	1,368	410	8,566	5.45%	0	0	0
Left Party – Communists	VPK	154	274	219	370	1,237	471	126	720	719	68	1,476	241	6,075	3.87%	0	0	0
Christian Democratic Unity	KDS	239	107	213	463	544	315	66	354	578	164	524	198	3,765	2.40%	0	0	0
Communist Party of Sweden	SKP	3	20	0	10	78	9	1	10	51	2	37	6	227	0.14%	0	0	0
Communist League Marxist–Leninists (the revolutionaries)	KFML(r)	4	0	3	1	31	1	0	4	20	0	9	6	79	0.05%	0	0	0
Other parties		0	0	0	0	5	0	0	1	3	0	1	0	10	0.01%	0	0	0
Valid votes		7,085	7,462	5,636	12,254	34,510	8,540	6,857	14,279	17,601	5,109	26,999	10,794	157,126	100.00%	9	1	10
Rejected votes		14	10	7	11	68	4	13	24	24	8	42	12	237	0.15%			
Total polled		7,099	7,472	5,643	12,265	34,578	8,544	6,870	14,303	17,625	5,117	27,041	10,806	157,363	91.22%			
Registered electors		7,822	8,121	6,077	13,324	38,006	9,339	7,464	15,556	19,336	5,670	30,092	11,696	172,503				
Turnout		90.76%	92.01%	92.86%	92.05%	90.98%	91.49%	92.04%	91.95%	91.15%	90.25%	89.86%	92.39%	91.22%				

The following candidates were elected: Stig Alemyr (S); Arne Andersson (S); Gösta Andersson (C); Fritz Börjesson (C); Eric Krönmark (M); Bernt Nilsson (S); Bertil Petersson (S); Birger Rosqvist (S); Lars Schött (M); and Ivan Svanström (C).

===== 1970 =====
Results of the 1970 general election held on 20 September 1970:

Party		Votes per municipality																	Total votes	%	Seats		
Party		Ålem	Borg- holm	Emma- boda	Flise- ryd	Högsby	Hults- fred	Kalmar	Mönste- rås	Mörby- långa	Nybro	Ölands- Åkerbo	Oskars- hamn	Torsås	Tors- lunda	Väster- vik	Vimmer- by	Postal votes	Total votes	%	Con.	Lev.	Tot.
Swedish Social Democratic Party	S	1,593	1,014	3,057	567	2,306	4,951	13,810	1,573	1,437	5,664	576	7,707	1,502	627	12,157	3,422	7,173	69,136	45.04%	5	0	5
Centre Party	C	712	1,861	2,055	212	1,455	3,452	4,956	724	1,085	3,350	1,210	2,406	1,938	1,145	4,941	4,167	3,358	39,027	25.42%	3	0	3
Moderate Party	M	342	547	601	132	625	1,270	4,026	421	506	1,300	172	1,640	735	414	2,322	1,192	4,391	20,636	13.44%	1	1	2
People's Party	F	206	309	405	40	331	884	3,261	290	315	862	152	1,554	323	208	1,990	596	2,985	14,711	9.58%	1	0	1
Left Party – Communists	VPK	164	93	222	44	201	271	979	195	35	645	37	567	22	32	1,142	174	600	5,423	3.53%	0	0	0
Christian Democratic Unity	KDS	111	88	81	27	237	484	568	141	47	359	88	435	188	23	395	214	703	4,189	2.73%	0	0	0
Communist League Marxists-Leninists	KFML	0	2	1	0	0	12	45	0	0	5	1	9	1	0	14	6	67	163	0.11%	0	0	0
Other parties		6	6	5	0	6	3	88	2	0	18	0	6	3	4	27	14	37	225	0.15%	0	0	0
Valid votes		3,134	3,920	6,427	1,022	5,161	11,327	27,733	3,346	3,425	12,203	2,236	14,324	4,712	2,453	22,988	9,785	19,314	153,510	100.00%	10	1	11
Rejected votes		0	8	12	0	4	8	19	0	0	7	1	26	2	2	17	11	69	186	0.12%			
Total polled exc. postal votes		3,134	3,928	6,439	1,022	5,165	11,335	27,752	3,346	3,425	12,210	2,237	14,350	4,714	2,455	23,005	9,796	19,383	153,696				
Postal votes		260	582	786	86	552	1,252	5,565	545	392	1,976	161	1,730	386	238	3,721	1,144	-19,383	-7				
Total polled inc. postal votes		3,394	4,510	7,225	1,108	5,717	12,587	33,317	3,891	3,817	14,186	2,398	16,080	5,100	2,693	26,726	10,940	0	153,689	88.62%			
Registered electors		3,747	5,202	8,092	1,260	6,376	13,935	37,697	4,438	4,279	15,874	2,707	18,239	5,855	3,061	30,461	12,192		173,415				
Turnout		90.58%	86.70%	89.29%	87.94%	89.66%	90.33%	88.38%	87.67%	89.20%	89.37%	88.59%	88.16%	87.11%	87.98%	87.74%	89.73%		88.62%				

The following candidates were elected: Stig Alemyr (S); Gösta Andersson (C); Fritz Börjesson (C); Mac Hamrin (F); Eric Johanson (S); Eric Krönmark (M); Bernt Nilsson (S); Bertil Petersson (S); Birger Rosqvist (S); Lars Schött (M); and Ivan Svanström (C).

Permanent substitutions:

- Eric Johanson (S) died on 23 July 1973 and was replaced by Gunnar Oskarsson (S) on 5 September 1973.
