= List of members of the Riksdag, 1998–2002 =

This is a list of members of the Riksdag, the national parliament of Sweden. The Riksdag is a unicameral assembly with 349 members of parliament (Swedish: riksdagsledamöter), who are elected on a proportional basis to serve fixed terms of four years. In the Riksdag, members are seated per constituency and not party. The following MPs were elected in the 1998 Swedish general election.

Name	Party	Constituency, seat
Karl Gustav Abramsson	Social Democrats	Västerbottens län, seat no. 333
Carina Adolfsson Elgestam	Social Democrats	Kronobergs län, seat no. 126
Berit Adolfsson	Moderate Party	Västra Götalands läns västra, seat no. 225
Amanda Agestav	Christian Democrats	Stockholms län, seat no. 66
Urban Ahlin	Social Democrats	Västra Götalands läns östra, seat no. 254
Birgitta Ahlqvist	Social Democrats	Norrbottens län, seat no. 341
Johnny Ahlqvist	Social Democrats	Skåne Northern and Eastern, seat no. 178
Christel Anderberg	Moderate Party	Dalarnas län, seat no. 292
Barbro Andersson Öhrn	Social Democrats	Uppsala län, seat no. 69
Anders Andersson	Christian Democrats	Skåne Northern and Eastern, seat no. 185
Hans Andersson	Left Party	Dalarnas län, seat no. 294
Jörgen Andersson	Social Democrats	Hallands län, seat no. 196
Margareta Andersson	Centre Party	Jönköpings län, seat no. 116
Marianne Andersson	Centre Party	Västra Götalands läns norra, seat no. 230
Sten Andersson	independent	Malmö kommun, seat no. 145
Yvonne Andersson	Christian Democrats	Östergötlands län, seat no. 98
Kia Andreasson	Green Party	Göteborgs kommun, seat no. 206
Sture Arnesson	Left Party	Värmlands län, seat no. 262
Eva Arvidsson	Social Democrats	Stockholms län, seat no. 43
Beatrice Ask	Moderate Party	Stockholms kommun, seat no. 6
Stefan Attefall	Christian Democrats	Stockholms kommun, seat no. 11
Nils Fredrik Aurelius	Moderate Party	Kalmar län, seat no. 132
Gunnar Axén	Moderate Party	Östergötlands län, seat no. 100
Jan Backman	Moderate Party	Skåne Western, seat no. 153
Lennart Beijer	Left Party	Kalmar län, seat no. 133
Cinnika Beiming	Social Democrats	Stockholms län, seat no. 50
Inga Berggren	Moderate Party	Skåne Southern, seat no. 163
Mats Berglind	Social Democrats	Uppsala län, seat no. 75
Mona Berglund Nilsson	Social Democrats	Västra Götalands läns västra, seat no. 223
Rune Berglund	Social Democrats	Jämtlands län, seat no. 323
Jan Bergqvist	Social Democrats	Göteborgs kommun, seat no. 198
Harald Bergström	Christian Democrats	Kronobergs län, seat no. 122
Sven Bergström	Centre Party	Gävleborgs län, seat no. 305
Carl Bildt	Moderate Party	Stockholms kommun, seat no. 2
Per Bill	Moderate Party	Uppsala län, seat no. 73
Knut Billing	Moderate Party	Stockholms län, seat no. 30
Karl-Göran Biörsmark	Liberal People’s Party	Östergötlands län, seat no. 91
Laila Bjurling	Social Democrats	Södermanlands län, seat no. 84
Charlotta L. Bjälkebring	Left Party	Södermanlands län, seat no. 84
Anders Björck	Moderate Party	Jönköpings län, seat no. 109
Ulf Björklund	Christian Democrats	Dalarnas län, seat no. 293
Jan Björkman	Social Democrats	Blekinge län, seat no. 141
Lars Björkman	Moderate Party	Västra Götalands läns södra, seat no. 242
Maud Björnemalm	Social Democrats	Örebro län, seat no. 268
Britt Bohlin Olsson	Social Democrats	Västra Götalands läns norra, seat no. 232
Sinikka Bohlin	Social Democrats	Gävleborgs län, seat no. 301
Claes-Göran Brandin	Social Democrats	Göteborgs kommun, seat no. 204
Ingrid Burman	Left Party	Uppsala län, seat no. 70
Laila Bäck	Social Democrats	Dalarnas län, seat no. 297
Lars Bäckström	Left Party	Västra Götalands läns västra, seat no. 220
Lisbet Calner	Social Democrats	Västra Götalands läns västra, seat no. 217
Leif Carlson	Moderate Party	Kalmar län, seat no. 127
Birgitta Carlsson	Centre Party	Västra Götalands läns östra, seat no. 250
Inge Carlsson	Social Democrats	Östergötlands län, seat no. 89
Marianne Carlström	Social Democrats	Göteborgs kommun, seat no. 201
Åke Carnerö	Christian Democrats	Västra Götalands läns västra, seat no. 221
Birgitta Dahl	Social Democrats	Uppsala län, seat no. 67
Lennart Daléus	Centre Party	Stockholms län, seat no. 42
Britt-Marie Danestig	Left Party	Östergötlands län, seat no. 94
Torgny Danielsson	Social Democrats	Värmlands län, seat no. 258
Inger Davidson	Christian Democrats	Stockholms län, seat no. 37
Anne-Katrine Dunker	Moderate Party	Gävleborgs län, seat no. 311
Susanne Eberstein	Social Democrats	Västernorrlands län, seat no. 314
Erik Arthur Egervärn	Centre Party	Jämtlands län, seat no. 326
Mats Einarsson	Left Party	Stockholms län, seat no. 55
Lena Ek	Centre Party	Östergötlands län, seat no. 99
Maud Ekendahl	Moderate Party	Skåne Northern and Eastern, seat no. 179
Berndt Ekholm	Social Democrats	Västra Götalands läns södra, seat no. 243
Kjell Eldensjö	Christian Democrats	Västra Götalands läns södra, seat no. 244
Lars Elinderson	Moderate Party	Västra Götalands läns östra, seat no. 257
Catharina Elmsäter-Svärd	Moderate Party	Stockholms län, seat no. 49
Tomas Eneroth	Social Democrats	Kronobergs län, seat no. 124
Marie Engström	Left Party	Värmlands län, seat no. 260
Karin Enström	Moderate Party	Stockholms län, seat no. 57
Dan Ericsson	Christian Democrats	Östergötlands län, seat no. 96
Alf Eriksson	Social Democrats	Hallands län, seat no. 190
Ingvar Eriksson	Moderate Party	Skåne Northern and Eastern, seat no. 175
Peter Eriksson	Green Party	Norrbottens län, seat no. 343
Stig Eriksson	Left Party	Norrbottens län, seat no. 348
Eskil Erlandsson	Centre Party	Kronobergs län, seat no. 123
Björn von der Esch	Christian Democrats	Södermanlands län, seat no. 86
Gustaf von Essen	Moderate Party	Uppsala län, seat no. 68
Ann-Marie Fagerström	Social Democrats	Kalmar län, seat no. 135
Karin Falkmer	Moderate Party	Västmanlands län, seat no. 284
Barbro Feltzing	Green Party	Västra Götalands läns norra, seat no. 233
Elisabeth Fleetwood	Moderate Party	Stockholms kommun, seat no. 1
Eva Flyborg	Liberal People’s Party	Göteborgs kommun, seat no. 205
Sonja Fransson	Social Democrats	Västra Götalands läns södra, seat no. 244
Rose-Marie Frebran	Christian Democrats	Örebro län, seat no. 270
Lennart Fridén	Moderate Party	Göteborgs kommun, seat no. 204
Helena Frisk	Social Democrats	Örebro län, seat no. 271
Viola Furubjelke	Social Democrats	Östergötlands län, seat no. 92
Reynoldh Furustrand	Social Democrats	Södermanlands län, seat no. 82
Margit Gennser	Moderate Party	Malmö kommun, seat no. 144
Viviann Gerdin	Centre Party	Värmlands län, seat no. 262
Gunnar Goude	Green Party	Uppsala län, seat no. 77
Carl Fredrik Graf	Moderate Party	Hallands län, seat no. 188
Lars U. Granberg	Social Democrats	Norrbottens län, seat no. 346
Marie Granlund	Social Democrats	Malmö kommun, seat no. 148
Per Erik Granström	Social Democrats	Dalarnas län, seat no. 290
Monica Green	Social Democrats	Västra Götalands läns östra, seat no. 253
Rolf Gunnarsson	Moderate Party	Dalarnas län, seat no. 292
Holger Gustafsson	Christian Democrats	Västra Götalands läns östra, seat no. 251
Lars Gustafsson	Christian Democrats	Hallands län, seat no. 196
Lennart Gustavsson	Left Party	Västerbottens län, seat no. 331
Åke Gustavsson	Social Democrats	Jönköpings län, seat no. 106
Johnny Gylling	Christian Democrats	Blekinge län, seat no. 143
Michael Hagberg	Social Democrats	Södermanlands län, seat no. 83
Catharina Hagen	Moderate Party	Stockholms län, seat no. 61
Stefan Hagfeldt	Moderate Party	Östergötlands län, seat no. 92
Caroline Hagström	Christian Democrats	Skåne Southern, seat no. 171
Ulla-Britt Hagström	Christian Democrats	Västra Götalands läns östra, seat no. 253
Carl B. Hamilton	Liberal People’s Party	Stockholms län, seat no. 58
Matz Hammarström	Green Party	Skåne Southern, seat no. 170
Agne Hansson	Centre Party	Kalmar län, seat no. 129
Roy Hansson	Moderate Party	Gotlands län, seat no. 136
Carl Erik Hedlund	Moderate Party	Stockholms kommun, seat no. 19
Lennart Hedquist	Moderate Party	Uppsala län, seat no. 69
Kerstin Heinemann	Liberal People’s Party	Västmanlands län, seat no. 282
Chris Heister	Moderate Party	Stockholms län, seat no. 38
Owe Hellberg	Left Party	Gävleborgs län, seat no. 304
Gun Hellsvik	Moderate Party	Skåne Southern, seat no. 164
Tom Heyman	Moderate Party	Göteborgs kommun, seat no. 201
Helena Hillar Rosenqvist	Green Party	Östergötlands län, seat no. 97
Lena Hjelm-Wallén	Social Democrats	Västmanlands län, seat no. 281
Lars Hjertén	Moderate Party	Västra Götalands läns östra, seat no. 247
Hans Hjortzberg-Nordlund	Moderate Party	Hallands län, seat no. 191
Ulla Hoffmann	Left Party	Stockholms kommun, seat no. 7
Siv Holma	Left Party	Norrbottens län, seat no. 342
Nils-Göran Holmqvist	Social Democrats	Örebro län, seat no. 270
Sven Hulterström	Social Democrats	Göteborgs kommun, seat no. 200
Cristina Husmark Pehrsson	Moderate Party	Skåne Western, seat no. 157
Carina Hägg	Social Democrats	Jönköpings län, seat no. 115
Göran Hägglund	Christian Democrats	Jönköpings län, seat no. 111
Kent Härstedt	Social Democrats	Skåne Western, seat no. 159
Anders G. Högmark	Moderate Party	Kronobergs län, seat no. 122
Tomas Högström	Moderate Party	Västmanlands län, seat no. 283
Helena Höij	Christian Democrats	Stockholms kommun, seat no. 16
Gunnar Hökmark	Moderate Party	Stockholms kommun, seat no. 1
Margareta Israelsson	Social Democrats	Västmanlands län, seat no. 281
Magnus Jacobsson	Christian Democrats	Västmanlands län, seat no. 290
Karin Jeppsson	Social Democrats	Blekinge län, seat no. 139
Berit Jóhannesson	Left Party	Göteborgs kommun, seat no. 209
Anita Johansson	Social Democrats	Stockholms län, seat no. 30
Ann-Kristine Johansson	Social Democrats	Värmlands län, seat no. 259
Eva Johansson	Social Democrats	Stockholms län, seat no. 36
Kenneth Johansson	Centre Party	Dalarnas län, seat no. 294
Mikael Johansson	Green Party	Örebro län, seat no. 274
Morgan Johansson	Social Democrats	Skåne Southern, seat no. 171
Märta Johansson	Social Democrats	Västra Götalands läns västra, seat no. 223
Ingvar Johnsson	Social Democrats	Västra Götalands läns norra, seat no. 229
Jeppe Johnsson	Moderate Party	Blekinge län, seat no. 142
Elver Jonsson	Liberal People’s Party	Västra Götalands läns norra, seat no. 228
Göte Jonsson	Moderate Party	Jönköpings län, seat no. 108
Ingemar Josefsson	Social Democrats	Stockholms kommun, seat no. 13
Håkan Juholt	Social Democrats	Kalmar län, seat no. 136
Thomas Julin	Green Party	Gävleborgs län, seat no. 305
Henrik S. Järrel	Moderate Party	Stockholms kommun, seat no. 4
Anita Jönsson	Social Democrats	Skåne Southern, seat no. 165
Anders Karlsson	Social Democrats	Skåne Western, seat no. 158
Hans Karlsson	Social Democrats	Örebro län, seat no. 271
Kjell-Erik Karlsson	Left Party	Hallands län, seat no. 195
Ola Karlsson	Moderate Party	Örebro län, seat no. 272
Rinaldo Karlsson	Social Democrats	Västerbottens län, seat no. 330
Sonia Karlsson	Social Democrats	Östergötlands län, seat no. 93
Rolf Kenneryd	Centre Party	Hallands län, seat no. 186
Dan Kihlström	Christian Democrats	Värmlands län, seat no. 264
Arne Kjörnsberg	Social Democrats	Västra Götalands läns södra, seat no. 242
Maj-Inger Klingvall	Social Democrats	Östergötlands län, seat no. 95
Lennart Klockare	Social Democrats	Norrbottens län, seat no. 339
Lennart Kollmats	Liberal People’s Party	Hallands län, seat no. 194
Ulf Kristersson	Moderate Party	Stockholms kommun, seat no. 11
Kerstin Kristiansson Karlstedt	Social Democrats	Västernorrlands län, seat no. 315
Kenneth Kvist	Left Party	Stockholms län, seat no. 60
Bo Könberg	Liberal People’s Party	Stockholms kommun, seat no. 10
Per Lager	Green Party	Västra Götalands läns västra, seat no. 224
Jarl Lander	Social Democrats	Värmlands län, seat no. 258
Henrik Landerholm	Moderate Party	Södermanlands län, seat no. 81
Per Landgren	Christian Democrats	Göteborgs kommun, seat no. 210
Kenneth Lantz	Christian Democrats	Skåne Western, seat no. 156
Sofia Larsen	Centre Party	Örebro län, seat no. 276
Ewa Larsson	Green Party	Stockholms kommun, seat no. 9
Kaj Larsson	Social Democrats	Skåne Northern and Eastern, seat no. 176
Kalle Larsson	Left Party	Stockholms kommun, seat no. 17
Maria Larsson	Christian Democrats	Jönköpings län, seat no. 118
Roland Larsson	Social Democrats	Stockholms kommun, seat no. 24
Lars Leijonborg	Liberal People’s Party	Stockholms län, seat no. 31
Björn Leivik	Moderate Party	Västra Götalands läns norra, seat no. 238
Sören Lekberg	Social Democrats	Stockholms län, seat no. 33
Göran Lennmarker	Moderate Party	Stockholms län, seat no. 36
Anna Lilliehöök	Moderate Party	Stockholms kommun, seat no. 14
Mats Lindberg	Social Democrats	Västerbottens län, seat no. 329
Göran Lindblad	Moderate Party	Göteborgs kommun, seat no. 207
Lars Lindblad	Moderate Party	Skåne Southern, seat no. 172
Tanja Linderborg	Left Party	Västmanlands län, seat no. 287
Sylvia Lindgren	Social Democrats	Stockholms kommun, seat no. 5
Anna Lindh	Social Democrats	Södermanlands län, seat no. 87
Britt-Marie Lindkvist	Social Democrats	Malmö kommun, seat no. 149
Ester Lindstedt-Staaf	Christian Democrats	Hallands län, seat no. 194
Olle Lindström	Moderate Party	Norrbottens län, seat no. 342
Gudrun Lindvall	Green Party	Stockholms län, seat no. 48
Agneta Lundberg	Social Democrats	Västernorrlands län, seat no. 313
Carin Lundberg	Social Democrats	Västerbottens län, seat no. 328
Inger Lundberg	Social Democrats	Örebro län, seat no. 269
Bo Lundgren	Moderate Party	Skåne Northern and Eastern, seat no. 179
Sten Lundström	Left Party	Malmö kommun, seat no. 150
Johan Lönnroth	Left Party	Göteborgs kommun, seat no. 203
Lars-Erik Lövdén	Social Democrats	Malmö kommun, seat no. 146
Cecilia Magnusson	Moderate Party	Göteborgs kommun, seat no. 211
Göran Magnusson	Social Democrats	Västmanlands län, seat no. 280
Ragnwi Marcelind	Christian Democrats	Gävleborgs län, seat no. 308
Elisebeht Markström	Social Democrats	Södermanlands län, seat no. 85
Jerry Martinger	Moderate Party	Stockholms län, seat no. 35
Ulrica Messing	Social Democrats	Gävleborgs län, seat no. 303
Maggi Mikaelsson	Left Party	Västerbottens län, seat no. 332
Carina Moberg	Social Democrats	Stockholms län, seat no. 45
Per-Richard Molén	Moderate Party	Västernorrlands län, seat no. 314
Christina Oskarsson	Social Democrats	Västra Götalands läns norra, seat no. 237
Annika Nilsson	Social Democrats	Skåne Western, seat no. 155
Carl G. Nilsson	Moderate Party	Östergötlands län, seat no. 93
Lennart Nilsson	Social Democrats	Västra Götalands läns västra, seat no. 219
Martin Nilsson	Social Democrats	Jönköpings län, seat no. 112
Ulf Nilsson	Liberal People’s Party	Skåne Southern, seat no. 169
Per-Samuel Nisser	Moderate Party	Värmlands län, seat no. 266
Elise Norberg	Left Party	Örebro län, seat no. 276
Harald Nordlund	Liberal People’s Party	Uppsala län, seat no. 80
Kjell Nordström	Social Democrats	Västra Götalands läns östra, seat no. 249
Patrik Norinder	Moderate Party	Gävleborgs län, seat no. 302
Göran Norlander	Social Democrats	Västernorrlands län, seat no. 316
Pär Nuder	Social Democrats	Stockholms län, seat no. 44
Elizabeth Nyström	Moderate Party	Västra Götalands läns norra, seat no. 235
Ingrid Näslund	Christian Democrats	Göteborgs kommun, seat no. 202
Mats Odell	Christian Democrats	Stockholms län, seat no. 35
Mikael Odenberg	Moderate Party	Stockholms kommun, seat no. 3
Carina Ohlsson	Social Democrats	Västra Götalands läns östra, seat no. 255
Lars Ohly	Left Party	Stockholms kommun, seat no. 15
Ronny Olander	Social Democrats	Skåne Southern, seat no. 166
Kent Olsson	Moderate Party	Västra Götalands läns västra, seat no. 222
Lena Olsson	Left Party	Dalarnas län, seat no. 301
Rolf Olsson	Left Party	Göteborgs kommun, seat no. 203
Mikael Oscarsson	Christian Democrats	Uppsala län, seat no. 76
Yvonne Oscarsson	Left Party	Gävleborgs län, seat no. 313
Runar Patriksson	Liberal People’s Party	Värmlands län, seat no. 263
Peter Pedersen	Left Party	Örebro län, seat no. 273
Johan Pehrson	Liberal People’s Party	Örebro län, seat no. 275
Nalin Pekgul	Social Democrats	Stockholms kommun, seat no. 16
Bertil Persson	Moderate Party	Malmö kommun, seat no. 147
Catherine Persson	Social Democrats	Skåne Southern, seat no. 167
Göran Persson	Social Democrats	Malmö kommun, seat no. 147
Margareta Persson	Social Democrats	Jönköpings län, seat no. 113
Siw Persson	independent	Skåne Northern and Eastern, seat no. 177
Marina Pettersson	Social Democrats	Värmlands län, seat no. 261
Karin Pilsäter	Liberal People’s Party	Stockholms län, seat no. 40
Marietta de Pourbaix-Lundin	Moderate Party	Stockholms län, seat no. 47
Chatrine Pålsson Ahlgren	Christian Democrats	Kalmar län, seat no. 130
Raimo Pärssinen	Social Democrats	Gävleborgs län, seat no. 306
Ola Rask	Social Democrats	Stockholms län, seat no. 41
Fredrik Reinfeldt	Moderate Party	Stockholms län, seat no. 39
Inger René	Moderate Party	Västra Götalands läns västra, seat no. 221
Stig Rindborg	Moderate Party	Stockholms län, seat no. 38
Agneta Ringman	Social Democrats	Kalmar län, seat no. 134
Jonas Ringqvist	Left Party	Västra Götalands läns södra, seat no. 245
Fanny Rizell	Christian Democrats	Västra Götalands läns norra, seat no. 232
Per Rosengren	Left Party	Västra Götalands läns östra, seat no. 252
Rosita Runegrund	Christian Democrats	Västra Götalands läns västra, seat no. 224
Yvonne Ruwaida	Green Party	Stockholms kommun, seat no. 9
Bengt-Ola Ryttar	Social Democrats	Dalarnas län, seat no. 291
Jan-Evert Rådhström	Moderate Party	Värmlands län, seat no. 265
Ingegerd Sahlström	Social Democrats	Hallands län, seat no. 187
Marianne Samuelsson	Green Party	Jönköpings län, seat no. 233
Lena Sandlin-Hedman	Social Democrats	Västerbottens län, seat no. 329
Stig Sandström	Left Party	Västra Götalands läns norra, seat no. 233
Åke Sandström	Centre Party	Västerbottens län, seat no. 336
Birger Schlaug	Green Party	Södermanlands län, seat no. 0
Pierre Schori	Social Democrats	Stockholms kommun, seat no. 7
Gudrun Schyman	Left Party	Stockholms län, seat no. 33
Inger Segelström	Social Democrats	Stockholms kommun, seat no. 8
Birgitta Sellén	Centre Party	Västernorrlands län, seat no. 317
Anita Sidén	Moderate Party	Göteborgs kommun, seat no. 208
Bengt Silfverstrand	Social Democrats	Skåne Western, seat no. 152
Anders Sjölund	Moderate Party	Västerbottens län, seat no. 335
Sven-Erik Sjöstrand	Left Party	Skåne Northern and Eastern, seat no. 182
Christer Skoog	Social Democrats	Blekinge län, seat no. 140
Tuve Skånberg	Christian Democrats	Skåne Northern and Eastern, seat no. 180
Carl-Erik Skårman	Moderate Party	Stockholms kommun, seat no. 1
Kenth Skårvik	Liberal People’s Party	Västra Götalands läns västra, seat no. 216
Camilla Sköld Jansson	Left Party	Jämtlands län, seat no. 326
Berndt Sköldestig	Social Democrats	Östergötlands län, seat no. 96
Lisbeth Staaf-Igelström	Social Democrats	Värmlands län, seat no. 257
Tasso Stafilidis	Left Party	Skåne Western, seat no. 160
Kerstin-Maria Stalin	Green Party	Dalarnas län, seat no. 295
Hans Stenberg	Social Democrats	Västernorrlands län, seat no. 312
Rigmor Stenmark	Centre Party	Uppsala län, seat no. 71
Claes Stockhaus	Left Party	Västernorrlands län, seat no. 323
Inger Strömbom	Christian Democrats	Stockholms län, seat no. 62
Ola Sundell	Moderate Party	Jämtlands län, seat no. 325
Anders Sundström	Social Democrats	Norrbottens län, seat no. 345
Karin Svensson Smith	Left Party	Skåne Southern, seat no. 170
Alf Svensson	Christian Democrats	Jönköpings län, seat no. 110
Ingvar Svensson	Christian Democrats	Stockholms län, seat no. 48
Per-Olof Svensson	Social Democrats	Gävleborgs län, seat no. 307
Björn von Sydow	Social Democrats	Stockholms län, seat no. 42
Willy Söderdahl	Left Party	Blekinge län, seat no. 141
Nils-Erik Söderqvist	Social Democrats	Västra Götalands läns norra, seat no. 234
Ewa Thalén Finné	Moderate Party	Skåne Southern, seat no. 173
Ingela Thalén	Social Democrats	Stockholms län, seat no. 32
Gunilla Tjernberg	Christian Democrats	Västerbottens län, seat no. 334
Lars Tobisson	Moderate Party	Stockholms län, seat no. 29
Sten Tolgfors	Moderate Party	Örebro län, seat no. 272
Åsa Torstensson	Centre Party	Västra Götalands läns västra, seat no. 225
Marita Ulvskog	Social Democrats	Dalarnas län, seat no. 296
Per Unckel	Moderate Party	Östergötlands län, seat no. 92
Gunilla Wahlén	Left Party	Västernorrlands län, seat no. 318
Göte Wahlström	Social Democrats	Jönköpings län, seat no. 117
Tommy Waidelich	Social Democrats	Stockholms län, seat no. 51
Maj-Britt Wallhorn	Christian Democrats	Malmö kommun, seat no. 149
Gunnel Wallin	Centre Party	Skåne Northern and Eastern, seat no. 183
Lars Wegendal	Social Democrats	Kronobergs län, seat no. 125
Karin Wegestål	Social Democrats	Skåne Southern, seat no. 161
Ulla Wester	Social Democrats	Skåne Northern and Eastern, seat no. 181
Per Westerberg	Moderate Party	Södermanlands län, seat no. 81
Barbro Westerholm	Liberal People’s Party	Stockholms kommun, seat no. 3
Majléne Westerlund Panke	Social Democrats	Hallands län, seat no. 191
Henrik Westman	Moderate Party	Stockholms län, seat no. 52
Margareta Winberg	Social Democrats	Jämtlands län, seat no. 322
Lilian Virgin	Social Democrats	Gotlands län, seat no. 138
Carlinge Wisberg	Left Party	Östergötlands län, seat no. 102
Birgitta Wistrand	Moderate Party	Stockholms kommun, seat no. 8
Siw Wittgren-Ahl	Social Democrats	Göteborgs kommun, seat no. 206
Liselotte Wågö	Moderate Party	Hallands län, seat no. 189
Erling Wälivaara	Christian Democrats	Norrbottens län, seat no. 344
Ingemar Vänerlöv	Christian Democrats	Västra Götalands läns norra, seat no. 236
Lennart Värmby	Left Party	Kronobergs län, seat no. 123
Ingegerd Wärnersson	Social Democrats	Skåne Northern and Eastern, seat no. 179
Anders Ygeman	Social Democrats	Stockholms kommun, seat no. 12
Mariann Ytterberg	Social Democrats	Västmanlands län, seat no. 285
Eva Zetterberg	Left Party	Stockholms kommun, seat no. 5
Rolf Åbjörnsson	Christian Democrats	Stockholms kommun, seat no. 14
Jan Erik Ågren	Christian Democrats	Västernorrlands län, seat no. 318
Anna Åkerhielm	Moderate Party	Skåne Western, seat no. 154
Lars Ångström	Green Party	Stockholms län, seat no. 54
Yvonne Ångström	Liberal People’s Party	Västerbottens län, seat no. 332
Erik Åsbrink	Social Democrats	Gävleborgs län, seat no. 310
Alice Åström	Left Party	Jönköpings län, seat no. 114
Conny Öhman	Social Democrats	Östergötlands län, seat no. 95
Monica Öhman	Social Democrats	Norrbottens län, seat no. 341
Krister Örnfjäder	Social Democrats	Kalmar län, seat no. 131
Sven-Erik Österberg	Social Democrats	Västmanlands län, seat no. 284
Thomas Östros	Social Democrats	Uppsala län, seat no. 74
