= Anders Andersson (Christian Democrat politician) =

Swedish politician

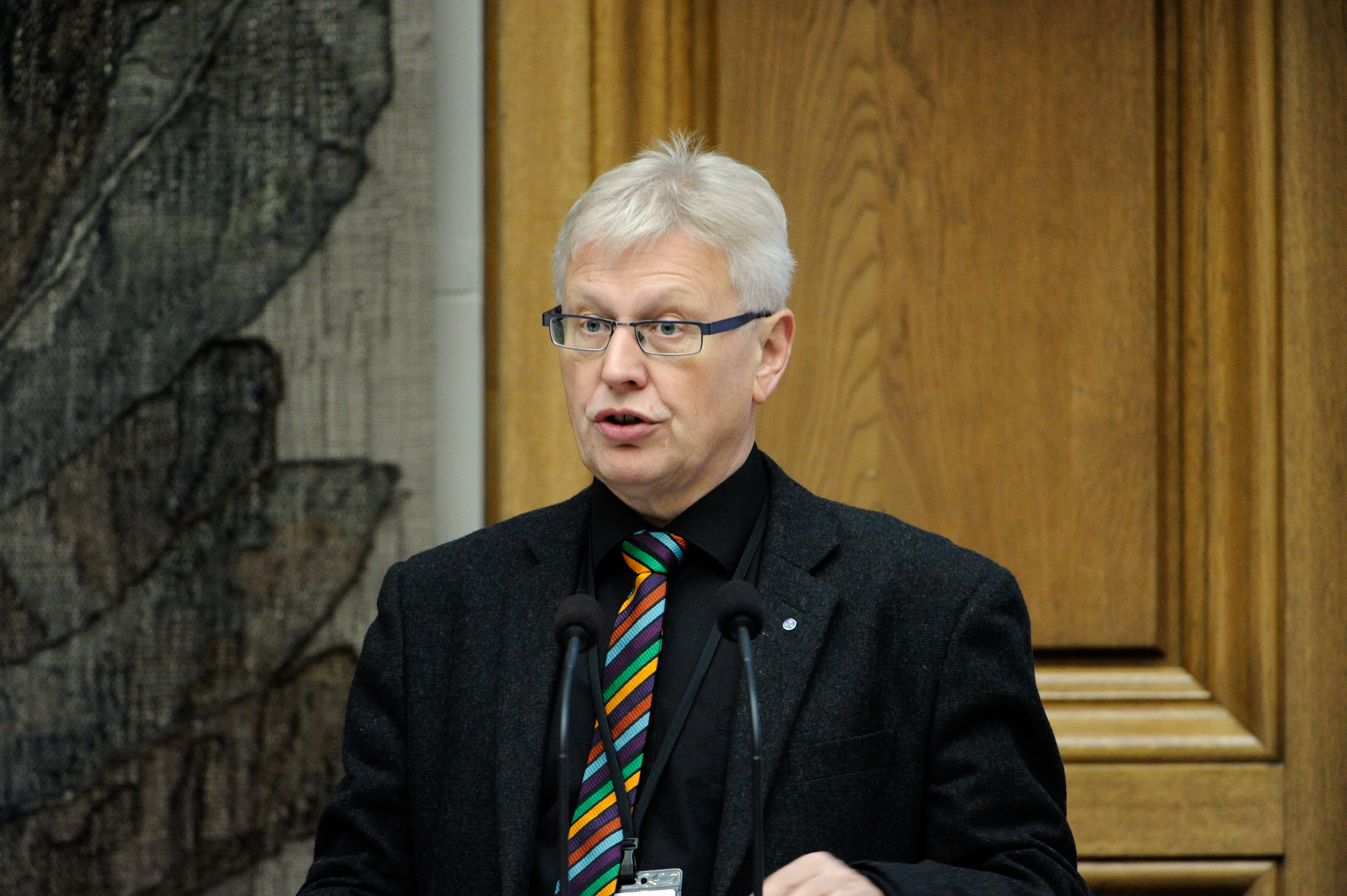
- Anders Andersson in 2011

MP for Skåne Northern and Eastern
- In office 1998–2002, 2006–2010 – 2010–2014

Personal details
- Born: 7 March 1955 (age 70); Jönköping County, Sweden
- Political party: Christian Democrat
- Spouse: Lena Ann-Charlotte Andersson

Karl Ivan Anders Andersson (born 7 March 1955, Fryele parish, Jönköping County) is a Swedish politician from the Christian Democrats. He was an ordinary member of the Riksdag between 2009 and 2014.

== Biography ==
During his formative years, Andersson first came to Värnamo, where his brother, county council politician Tommy Bernevång Forsberg, was born in 1959, and then to Hultsfred.

He was the chairman of the Young Christian Democrats between 1981 and 1984 and for a period second vice chairman of the Christian Democrats. He has been the district chairman of the Christian Democrats in Kalmar County for several years, and was the finance county councillor and chairman of the County Council Board in Kalmar County Council during the mandate period 2002 to 2006.

On 1 November 2009, Andersson became a member of the Swedish Parliament after Chatrine Pålsson Ahlgren resigned and was dismissed. In the 2010 Swedish general election, he was re-elected as a member of the Riksdag, elected in the Kalmar County constituency in seat 255. Among Andersson's committee assignments in the Riksdag, it is primarily noted that he was a member of the Committee on Health and Welfare 2009–2014 and a member of the Swedish delegation to the Nordic Council 2010–2014.

Andersson was often perceived internally in the party as an ideological guide for over 30 years at or near the party top and his views have almost always been in line with the party leadership. However, at the Christian Democrats' national congress in 2015, he opposed the party leadership on the issue of The December Agreement and argued that the party should resign from it, which was also decided by the congress.

Andersson lives in Järnforsen, an urban area in Hultsfred Municipality.

After the 2018 county council election, Andersson made a comeback as a full-time politician, this time as a regional councillor in opposition with responsibility for public transport, in Kalmar County.

== See also ==
- List of members of the Riksdag, 1998–2002
- List of members of the Riksdag, 2010–2014
