= Emmy Ahlstedt =

Swedish politician

Member of the Riksdag
- Incumbent
- Assumed office 28 September 2026
- Constituency: Kalmar County

Personal details
- Born: 1981 (age 44–45)
- Party: Centre Party

Emmy Ahlstedt (born 1981) is a Swedish politician for the Centre Party. She has been a member of the Riksdag since 2026, elected for the Kalmar County constituency.

== Biography ==
Ahlstedt was born in Gårdby in Mörbylånga Municipality and lives in the municipality. She has at least three years of post-secondary education.

Ahlstedt became involved in the Centre Party in 2014. She has been a regional councilor in Region Kalmar County with responsibility for health and medical care issues.

Ahead of the 2026 Swedish general election, Ahlstedt was the Centre Party's candidate in Kalmar County. The Centre Party received a balancing mandate in Kalmar County and Ahlstedt was thus elected to the Riksdag. She took office as a regular member of parliament on 28 September 2026.

== See also ==
- List of members of the Riksdag, 2026–2030
