= Carl Swensson =

Carl Swensson may refer to:

- Carl Aaron Swensson (1857–1904), American Lutheran minister and founder and president of Bethany College (Kansas)
- Carl Gustav Swensson (1861–1910), Swedish landscape architect

== See also ==
- Carl Swenson (born 1970), American cross-country skier
- Carl-Wiktor Svensson (born 1990), Swedish politician
