= Skogsberg =

Skogsberg is a surname. Notable people with the surname include:

- Eva Bengtson Skogsberg (born 1951), Swedish politician
- Ingvar Skogsberg (born 1937), Swedish film director and screenwriter
