= Carl-Wiktor Svensson =

Swedish politician

Member of the Riksdag
- Incumbent
- Assumed office 28 September 2026
- Constituency: Kalmar County

Personal details
- Born: 11 January 1990 (age 36) Parish of Högsby, Kalmar County, Sweden
- Party: Christian Democrats
- Other political affiliations: Moderate Party (previously)

Håkan Carl-Wiktor Charlie Svensson (born 11 January 1990) is a Swedish politician from the Christian Democrats. Svensson has been a regional councilor in Region Kalmar County since 2022. Svensson previously represented the Moderate Party, 2018–2022 as a non-serving deputy in the Riksdag. He has been Chairman of the Municipal Council of Högsby since 2026.

== See also ==
- List of members of the Riksdag, 2026–2030
