= Olle Olson =

Swedish politician (born 1994)

Member of the Riksdag
- Incumbent
- Assumed office 28 September 2026
- Constituency: Kalmar County

Personal details
- Born: 29 September 1994 (age 31)
- Party: Moderate Party

Gustav Olle Olson (born 29 September 1994) is a Swedish politician who was elected member of the Riksdag in 2026. From 2024 to 2025, he served as chairman of the Moderate Youth League in Kalmar County.
