= Gudrun Brunegård =

Swedish politician (born 1957)

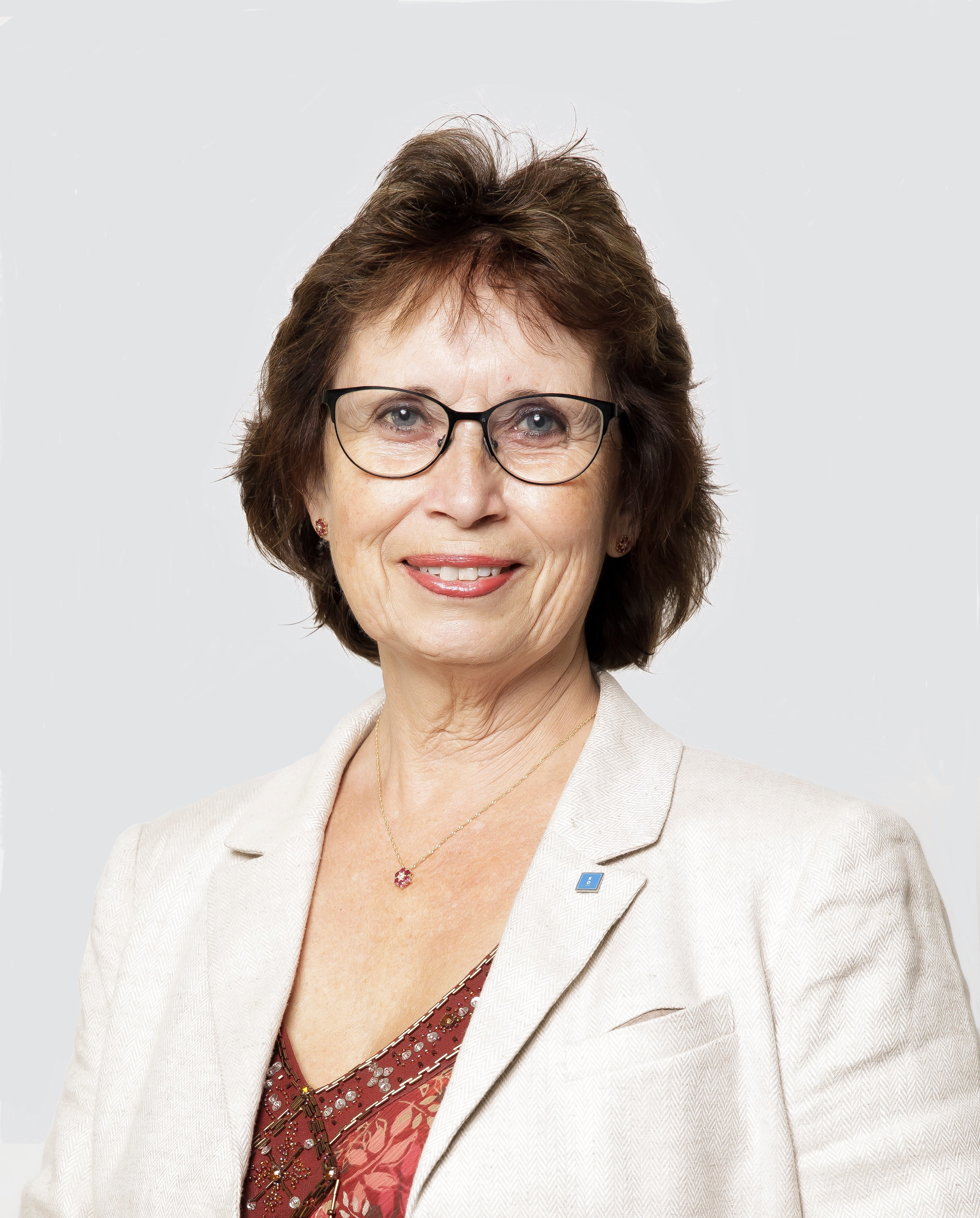

Member of the Riksdag
- In office 1 April 2019 – 2026
- Constituency: Kalmar County

Personal details
- Born: 1957 (age 68–69)
- Party: Christian Democrats

Gudrun Brunegård (born 1957) is a Swedish politician from the Christian Democrats. She served as a member of the Riksdag representing the constituency of Kalmar County. She was re-elected as a Member of the Riksdag in the 2022 Swedish general election.

== See also ==
- List of members of the Riksdag, 2018–2022
- List of members of the Riksdag, 2022–2026
