= Marcus Fridlund =

Swedish politician (born 1992)

- Fridlund in October 2026

Member of the Riksdag
- Incumbent
- Assumed office 28 September 2026
- Constituency: Kalmar County

Personal details
- Born: 1992 (age 33–34) Västervik, Sweden
- Party: Social Democratic Party

Fredric Marcus Mathias Fridlund (born 1992) is a Swedish politician and Member of the Riksdag. A member of the Social Democratic Party, he has represented Kalmar County since September 2026.

Fridlund was born in 1992 in Västervik. He was a plant operator/control room engineer at a combined heat and power plant.

Fridlund was a member of the municipal council in Västervik. He was elected to the Riksdag at the 2026 general election.
