= Mona Olin =

Swedish politician (born 1967)

Member of the Riksdag
- Incumbent
- Assumed office 26 September 2022
- Constituency: Kalmar County

Personal details
- Born: 1967 (age 58–59)
- Party: Sweden Democrats

Mona Ann-Charlotte Olin (born 1967) is a Swedish politician affiliated with the Sweden Democrats.

Olin was a director for an IT company before becoming a politician. She has served as a municipal councilor and a board member for the SD in Hörby municipality where she campaigned to open a family resource centre. She was elected as Member of the Riksdag in September 2022. She represents the constituency of Kalmar County. Since her election to parliament she has served on the social insurance committee in the Riksdag.
