= Lars Engsund =

Swedish politician (born 1968)

Lars-Christer Engsund (born 2 July 1968) is a Swedish politician from the Moderate Party who was elected to the Riksdag from Kalmar County constituency in the 2022 Swedish general election.
