= Marie Nicholson =

Swedish politician (born 1976)

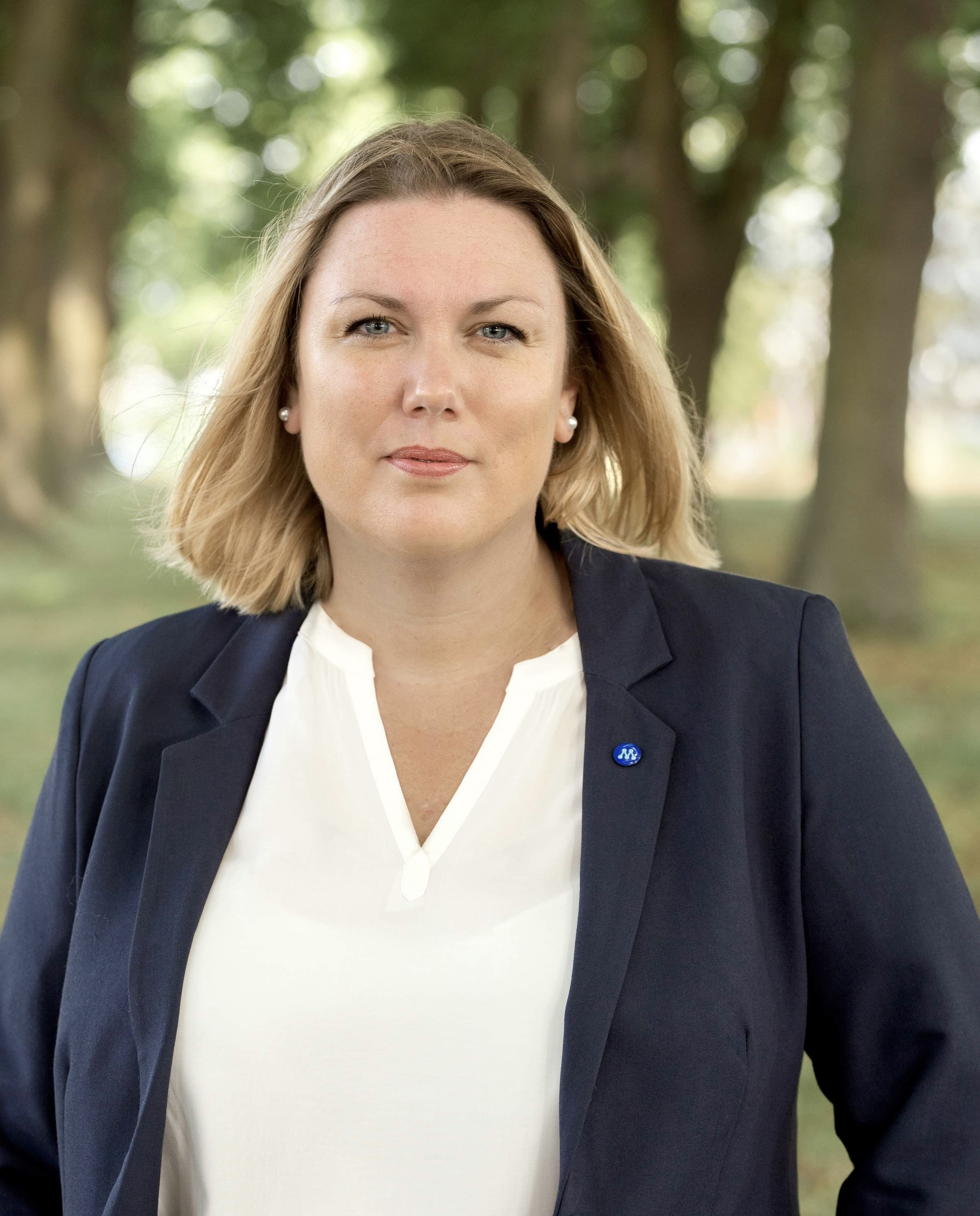
- Marie Nicholson in 2022

Member of the Riksdag
- Incumbent
- Assumed office 2022
- Constituency: Kalmar County

Personal details
- Born: Marie Charlotte Nilsson; 27 November 1976 (age 49) Kalmar, Sweden
- Party: Moderate Party

Marie Charlotte Nicholson (née Nilsson; born 27 November 1976) is a Swedish politician from the Moderate Party. Since 2022, she has been member of the Riksdag for Kalmar County.

== See also ==
- List of members of the Riksdag, 2022–2026
- List of members of the Riksdag, 2026–2030
