= Jan R. Andersson =

Swedish politician

Member of the Riksdag
- In office 2 October 2006 – 26 September 2022
- Constituency: Kalmar County

Personal details
- Born: Jan Richard Andersson; 5 December 1970 (age 55) Nederluleå parish, Norrbotten County, Sweden
- Party: Moderate Party
- Occupation: Political secretary

Jan Richard Andersson (born 5 December 1970) is a Swedish politician of the Moderate Party. He was a member of the Riksdag from 2006 to 2022, representing the Kalmar County constituency.

== Early life and education ==
Andersson attended the four-year technical programme at Midskogsskolan in Luleå, graduating in 1991. He subsequently completed military service and reserve officer training at the Göta Engineer Regiment and the Swedish Army Field Works Centre in Eksjö, finishing in 1993. He later studied at the University College of Luleå and Umeå University between 1994 and 1997.

== Political career ==
Before entering the Riksdag, Andersson worked as a political secretary for the Västerbotten County Council from 1996 to 1998 and for Kalmar Municipality from 1999 to 2006.

He served as a member of the Luleå municipal council from 1992 to 1994 and was elected to the Kalmar municipal council in 2002. He was also vice-chair of Kalmar Municipality's Children and Youth Committee from 2002 to 2006 and served on the board of the Regional Federation of Kalmar County.

Andersson became a member of the Riksdag following the 2006 Swedish general election. He served as an ordinary member from 2 October 2006 until 8 March 2020, was on leave between 9 March and 21 June 2020, and returned as an ordinary member from 22 June 2020 until 26 September 2022.

He was a member of the Committee on Health and Welfare from 2006 to 2011, the Committee on Justice from 2011 to 2014 and the Committee on Defence from 2014 to 2022.

Andersson also served as a deputy member of the Committee on Civil Affairs from 2006 to 2010, the Committee on European Union Affairs during parts of the periods 2007–2010 and 2018–2022, and the Swedish delegation to the Parliamentary Assembly of the Organization for Security and Co-operation in Europe from 2014 to 2018.

In 2011, while serving on the Committee on Health and Welfare, Andersson criticised needle and syringe exchange programmes. During a radio discussion, he argued that encouraging people who injected heroin to smoke the drug instead could reduce the transmission of blood-borne infections.

== Honours ==
- Sweden: Medal of the Riksdag, 12th size, 22 June 2022.
