= Eric Krönmark =

Swedish politician (1931–2024)

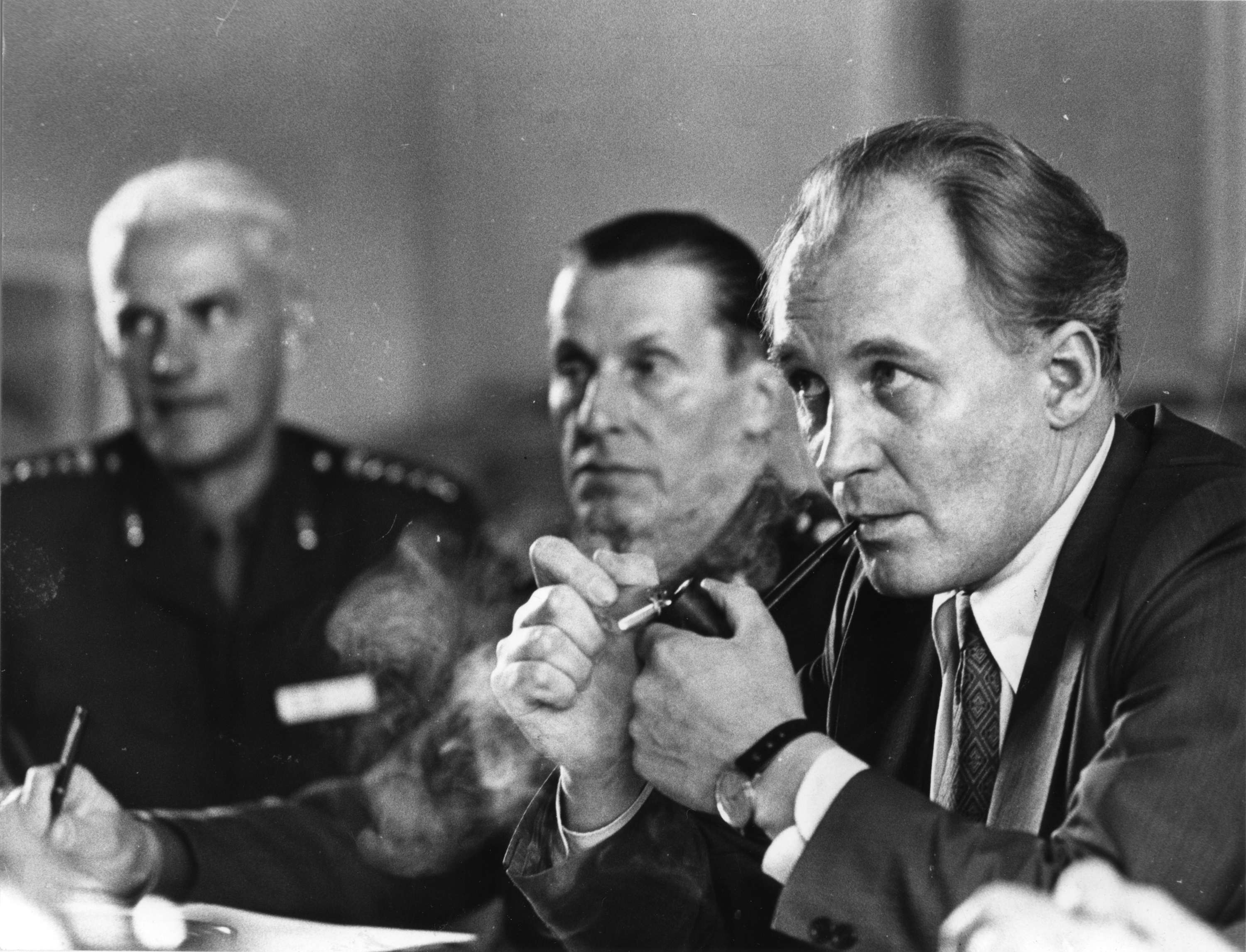
- Krönmark (right) in 1977

Minister of Defence
- In office 8 October 1976 – 12 October 1978
- Preceded by: Eric Holmqvist
- Succeeded by: Lars De Geer

Minister of Defence
- In office 12 October 1979 – 5 May 1981
- Prime Minister: Thorbjörn Fälldin
- Preceded by: Lars De Geer
- Succeeded by: Anders Dahlgren

Governor of Kalmar County
- In office 1981–1996
- Preceded by: Erik Westerlind
- Succeeded by: Anita Bråkenhielm

Personal details
- Born: 2 June 1931 Vimmerby, Sweden
- Died: 12 January 2024 (aged 92) Vimmerby, Sweden
- Party: Moderate Party

Eric Krönmark (2 June 1931 – 12 January 2024) was a Swedish farmer, Moderate Party politician and civil servant. He was Minister of Defence between 1976 and 1978 and again from 1979 until 1981. He also represented Kalmar as Member of Parliament of Sweden from 1965 to 1981. From 1981 to 1996 he was Governor of Kalmar County.

== Biography ==
Krönmark was a reserve officer in the Småland Regiment (infantry), with the rank of captain from 1968. He was elected to parliament in 1965 and was the second vice chairman of the Moderate Party from 1970 to 1971. Following the 1976 election he became Minister of Defence in the Fälldin I Cabinet, which lasted until 1978. Following the 1979 election, he returned as Minister of Defence in the Fälldin II Cabinet until the Moderate Party left the cabinet in 1981. Krönmark was then appointed Governor of Kalmar County, and remained in that post until his retirement in 1996.

He was noted for his Conservative views in the Moderate Party.
