= Falerum =

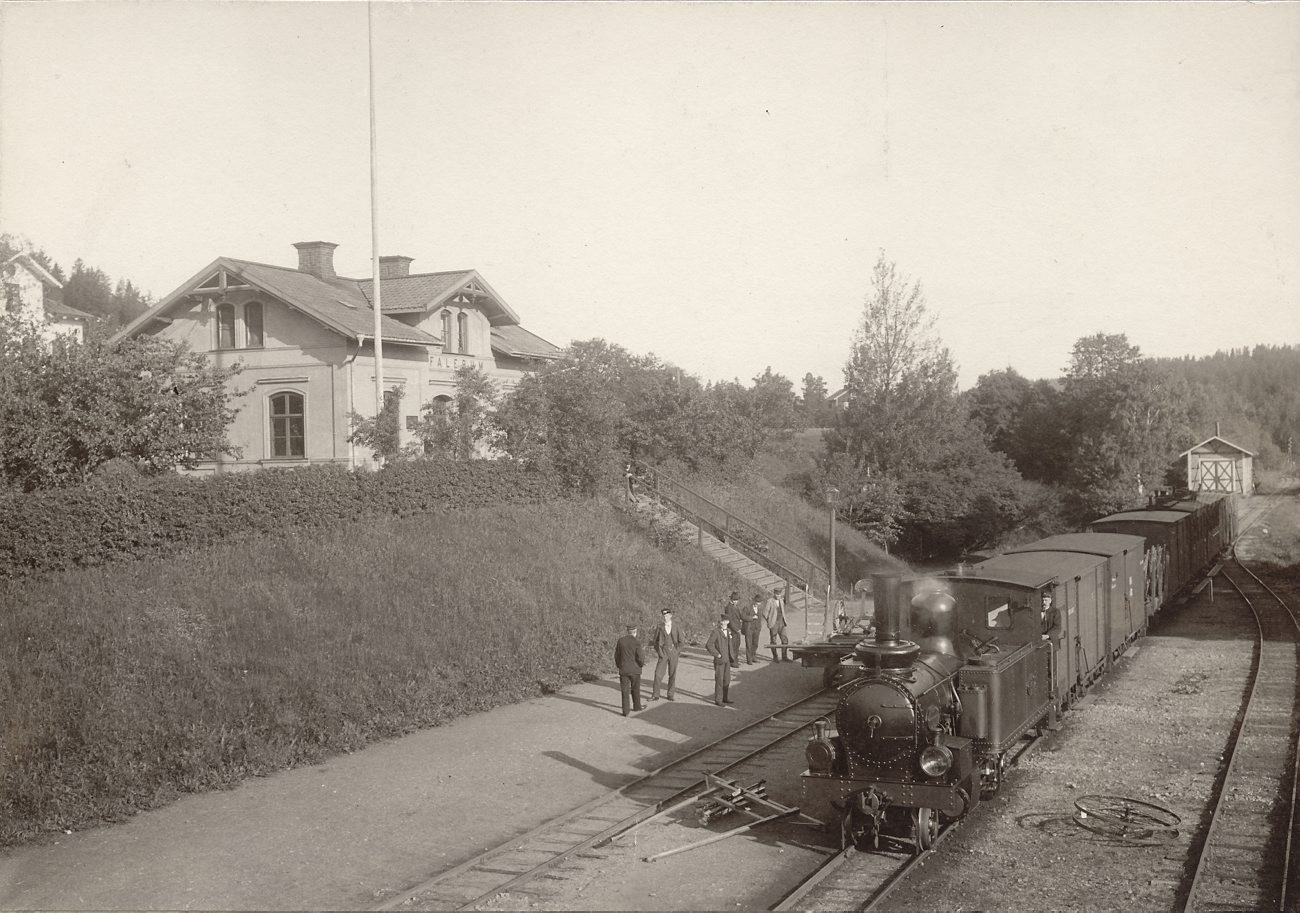

- Location within Östergötland Location within Sweden
- Coordinates: 58°09′N 16°13′E
- Country: Sweden
- Province: Småland
- County: Östergötland County
- Municipality: Åtvidaberg Municipality

Area
  - Total: 0.84 km^{2} (0.32 sq mi)

Population (31 December 2020)
  - Total: 232
  - Density: 280/km^{2} (720/sq mi)
- Time zone: UTC+1 (CET)
  - Summer (DST): UTC+2 (CEST)

Falerum (Swedish pronunciation: [ˈfɑ̂ːlɛrɵm]) is a locality situated in Åtvidaberg Municipality, Östergötland County, Sweden with 242 inhabitants in 2010.
