= Johnny Svedin =

Swedish politician (born 1969)

Member of the Riksdag
- Incumbent
- Assumed office 26 September 2022
- Constituency: Norrbotten

Personal details
- Born: 1969 (age 56–57)
- Party: Sweden Democrats
- Occupation: Psychiatrist

Johnny Svedin (born 1969) is a Swedish politician of the Sweden Democrats party who has been a member of the Riksdag since 2022 representing the Norrbotten constituency.

== Biography ==
Svedin is a specialist psychiatric nurse and has worked as a psychiatrist with young people. He has described mental health and youth issues as concerns which motivated his interest in politics. He first joined the Sweden Democrats after attending a party meeting with a friend in 2016 and has described himself as a social conservative "with one foot in the bourgeoisie (conservative) but where at the same time you have a lot of social safety nets left."

In 2018, Svedin was elected as a municipal councilor for the SD in Nybro where he also served on the party's executive board and later became the SD's spokesman in Nybro. He stood down from the position in 2021 after moving to Kalmar. He was elected as a member of parliament during the 2022 Swedish general election.

== See also ==
- List of members of the Riksdag, 2022–2026
