= Eva Bengtson Skogsberg =

Swedish politician (born 1951)

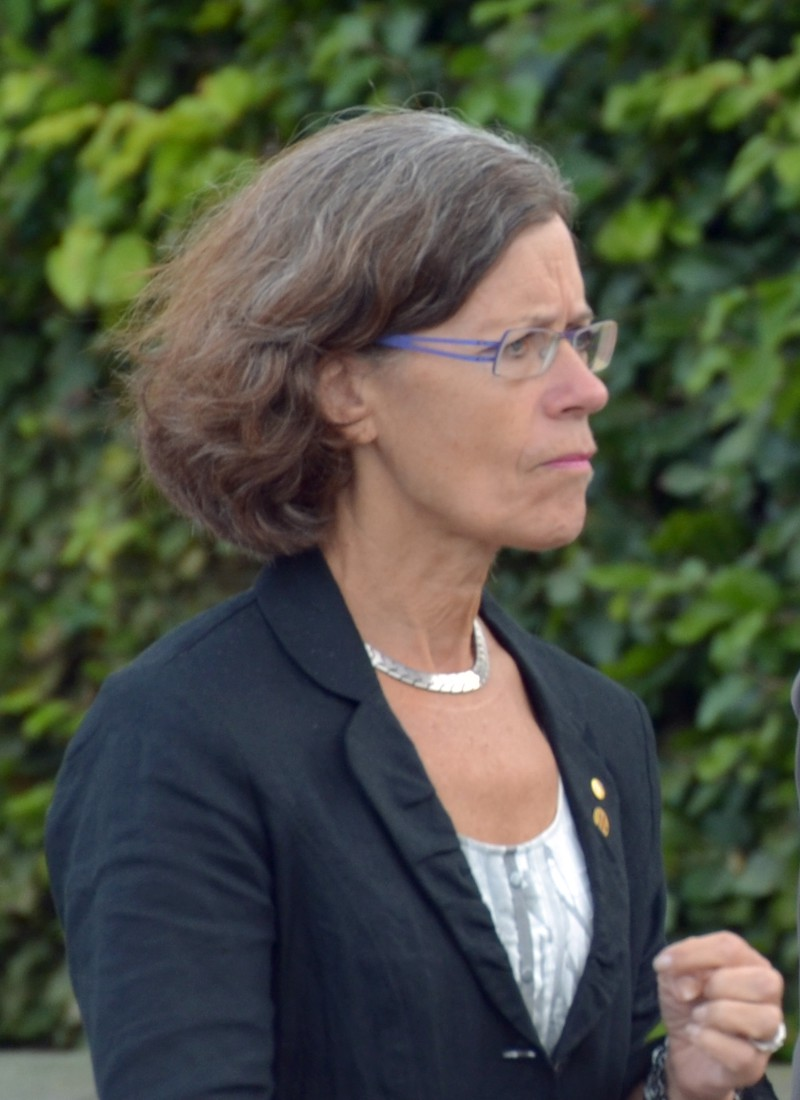
Eva Bengtson Skogsberg.

Eva Bengtson Skogsberg, born in 1951, is a Swedish politician of the Moderate Party. She was a member of the Riksdag (Parliament of Sweden) between 2006 and 2014.
