= Krister Örnfjäder =

Swedish politician

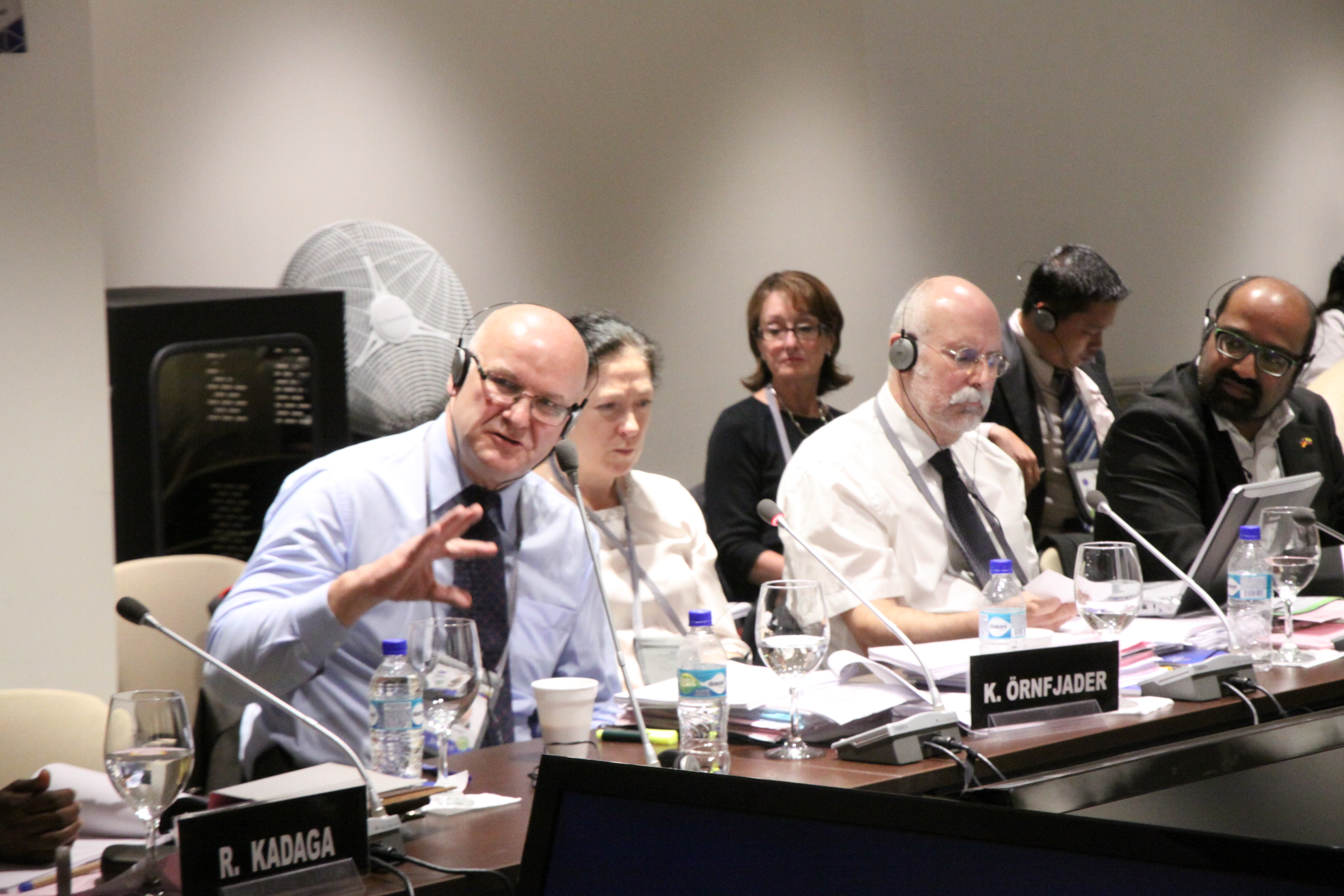
- Krister Örnfjäder (far left) at the 128th Assembly of the Inter-Parliamentary Union in Quito, Ecuador in 2013

member of the Riksdag
- In office 1993–2018

Father of the House
- In office 2015–2018

Personal details
- Political party: Social Democratic

Krister Örnfjäder (born 22 September 1952) is a Swedish Social Democratic politician who was member of the Riksdag from 1993 to 2018. He was Father of the House from 25 April 2015 to 24 September 2018.
