= Lennart Beijer =

Swedish politician (born 1947)

Lennart Beijer (born 1947), is a Swedish Left Party politician, member of the Riksdag 1994–2006.
