= Nils Fredrik Aurelius =

Swedish politician (born 1946)

Nils Fredrik Aurelius (born 1946) is a Swedish politician of the Moderate Party, member of the Riksdag in 1991, and then again 1994–2006.
