= Region Kalmar County =

Regional council of Kalmar County, Sweden

Region Kalmar County Region Kalmar län
- Regional Council
- Formation: 2019
- County: Kalmar County
- Country: Sweden
- Website: www.regionkalmar.se

Legislative branch
- Legislature: Regional Council
- Assembly members: 67

Executive branch
- Headquarters: Kalmar

Region Kalmar County (Swedish: Region Kalmar län) formerly Kalmar County Council (Swedish: Kalmar läns landsting), is the regional council for Kalmar County, Sweden. Region Kalmar County is responsible, primarily for healthcare and dental care. In addition to this, the region also has responsibility for regional development within the county. The region is also responsible for public transport between the county's municipalities and is involved in cultural activities. Region Kalmar County was formed on 1 January 2019 through the reorganisation of the County Council of Kalmar County and a merger with the Kalmar County Regional Federation.

== History ==
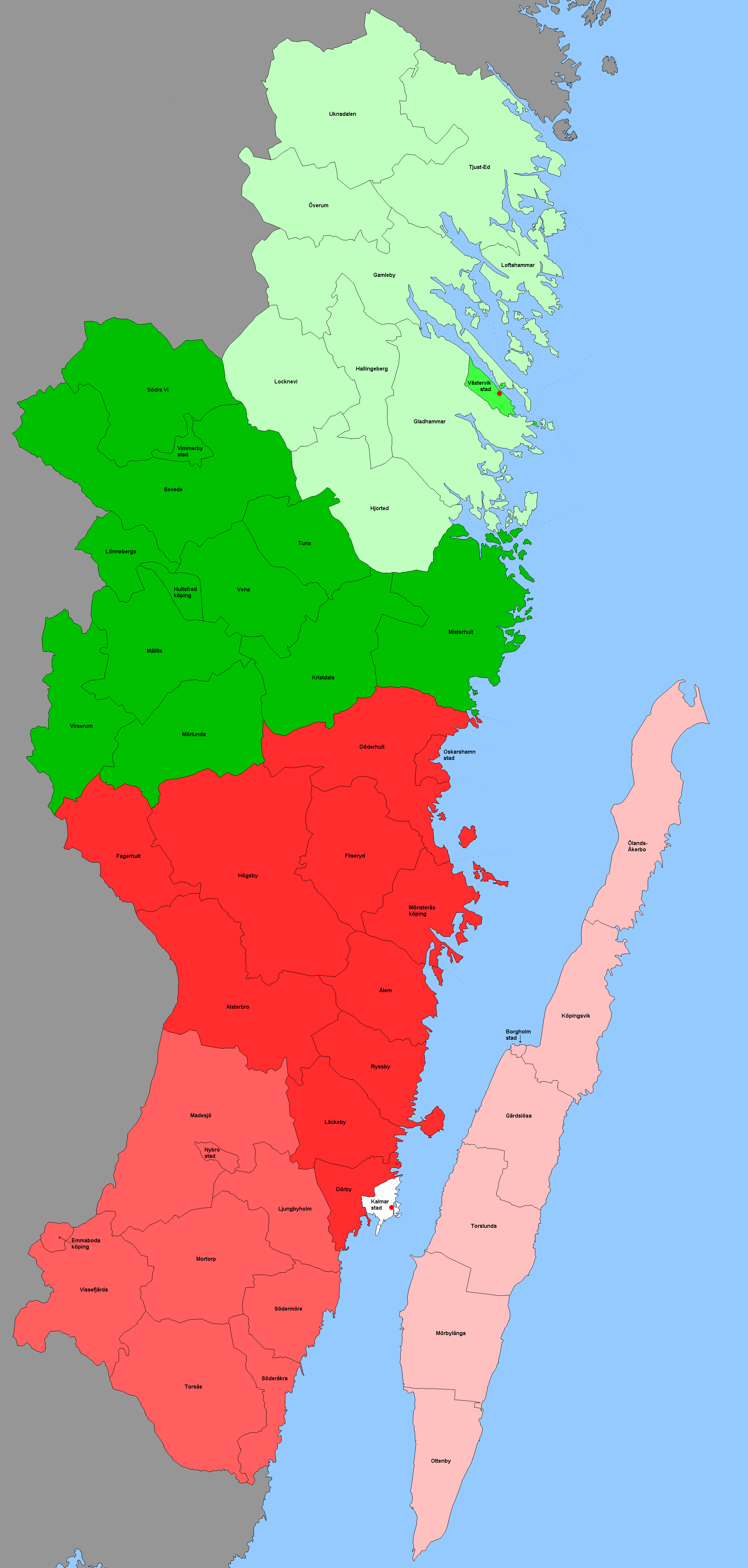
Map of Kalmar County's two county councils in 1962, with seats in Kalmar and Västervik (Red dots). Green represents Northern Kalmar County Council, and its different shades represent the various electoral districts in the county council elections. Red represents Southern Kalmar County Council, and its different shades represent the various electoral districts in the county council elections.

Before the County Council of Kalmar County, between 1864 and 1970, the county was divided into two county councils, Northern Kalmar County Council and Southern Kalmar County Council, with Västervik and Kalmar as their respective seats. The reason for the county's division into two councils was mainly Västervik's desire to secede from Kalmar County and form its own county with its own county council, something Kalmar did not accept. The dispute ended with the intervention of Royal Majesty. As a compromise, two county councils were formed within the same county, which was an unusual solution in Sweden, where all rural municipalities and smaller towns belonged to a single county council within the same county, except for the county-free cities. The County Administrative Board and the Governor were always the same for the entire county with its seat in Kalmar.

Northern Kalmar County Council comprised:

- The municipalities of Västervik, Vimmerby, and Hultsfred in present-day Kalmar County
- The parishes of Kristdala and Misterhult in the present-day Oskarshamn Municipality
- The parishes of Tryserum and Östra Ed, which in 1971 were transferred to Valdemarsvik Municipality, Östergötland County
- The parishes of Gärdserum and Hannäs, which in 1971 were transferred to Åtvidaberg Municipality, Östergötland County

Southern Kalmar County Council covered the remaining municipalities in Kalmar County, including Öland. However, it did not include Hälleberga, Algutsboda, and part of Älmeboda Rural Municipality, which in 1971 were transferred from Kronoberg County. In addition to its own hospital, Västervik also received its own mental hospital which treated patients from the Southern County Council as well.

After years of investigations, during which the Northern County Council was reduced due to negative population development and the transfer of Kristdala and Misterhult to Oskarshamn Municipality, and the Southern County Council in 1967, it was decided in 1969 to merge the two county councils into a single council for the whole of Kalmar County.

The County Council of Kalmar County was formed in 1971. At that time, parts of the former Northern County Council were transferred to the then Östergötland County Council, specifically areas in Småland, mainly around Falerum, which became part of Åtvidaberg Municipality and Valdemarsvik Municipality.

On 1 January 2019, the County Council of Kalmar County became Region Kalmar County through the merger of the county council and the regional federation.

== Hospitals ==
- Kalmar County Hospital
- Oskarshamn Hospital
- Västervik Hospital

== Regional Transport ==
Kalmar County Transport is an administration within Region Kalmar County and is the main operator of local and regional scheduled transport for passenger services by road and rail in the county.

== Education ==
- Högalid Folk High School
- Öland Folk High School
- Vimmerby Folk High School
- Gamleby Folk High School

== Culture ==
The region participates together with the county's municipalities in the municipal association of Kalmar County, which, together with Kalmar Municipality and the Kalmar County Heritage Association, operates Kalmar County Museum.

== Organisation ==
Region Kalmar County is, like all regions, a politically controlled organisation with the Regional Council as the highest decision-making body. The Regional Executive Board holds the executive political responsibility and prepares matters that are addressed in the regional council.

== Politics ==
Region Kalmar County is governed by a centre-left coalition consisting of the Social Democrats, Centre Party, and Left Party, in the majority.

=== Regional Leadership ===
Within Region Kalmar County, there are 13 regional councillors; 7 regional councillors for the majority and 6 opposition councillors for the opposition. Members of the executive committee and budget preparation are regional and opposition councillors within Region Kalmar County.

=== Electoral Districts ===
The region comprises 6 electoral districts in elections to the Regional Council.

- Kalmar 1 – Västervik Municipality
- Kalmar 2 – Hultsfred Municipality and Vimmerby Municipality
- Kalmar 3 – Högsby Municipality, Mönsterås Municipality and Oskarshamn Municipality
- Kalmar 4 – Emmaboda Municipality, Nybro Municipality and Torsås Municipality
- Kalmar 5 – Kalmar Municipality
- Kalmar 6 – Borgholm Municipality and Mörbylånga Municipality
