= Agne Hansson =

Swedish politician (born 1938)

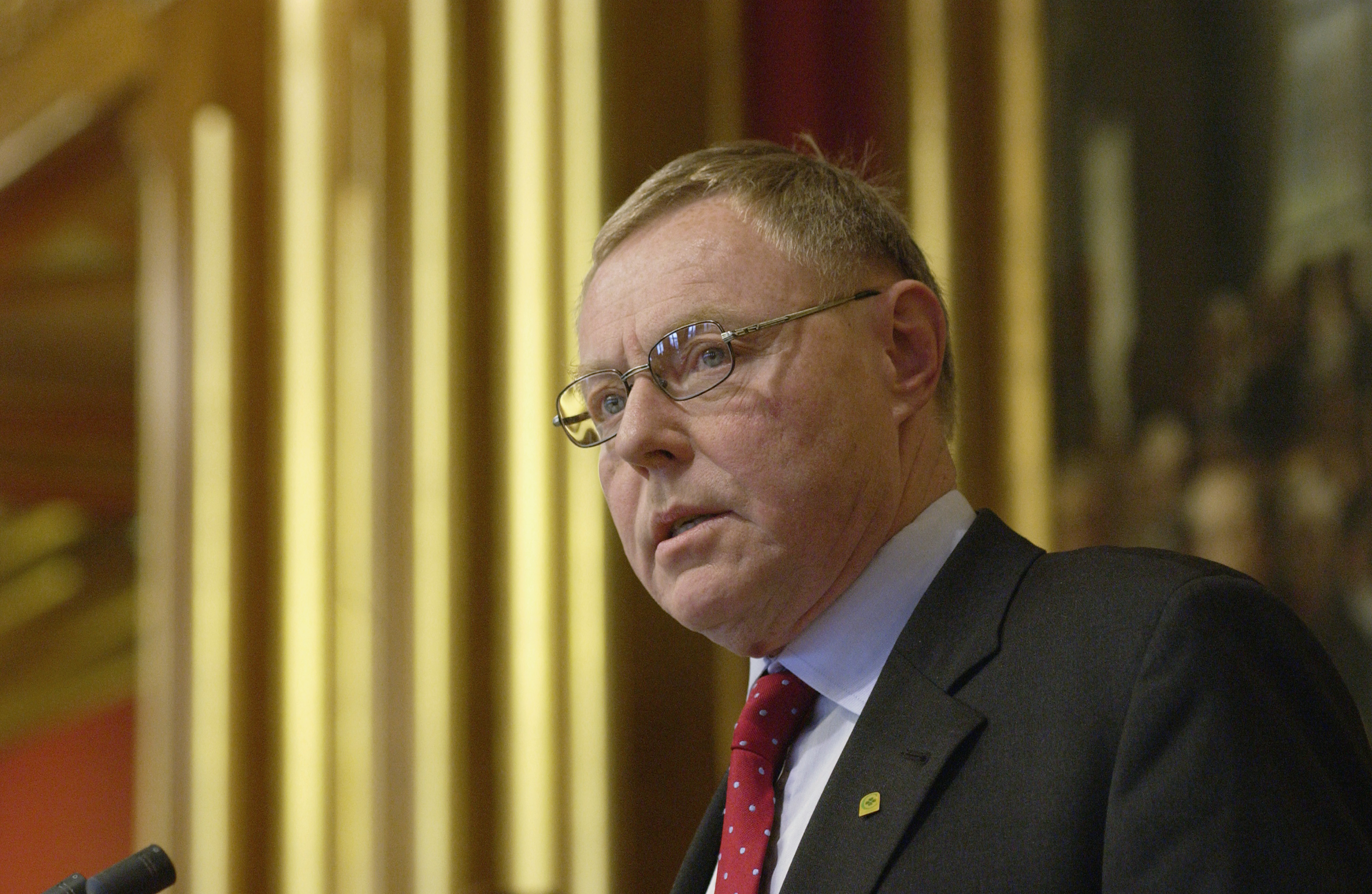

Agne Hansson (born 1938) is a Swedish Centre Party politician, member of the Riksdag 1982–2006.
