= Ann-Marie Fagerström =

Swedish politician (born 1953)

Ann-Marie Fagerström (born 1953), is a Swedish Social Democratic Party politician. She was a member of the Riksdag from 1994 to 2006.
