= Agneta Ringman =

Swedish politician (born 1949)

Agneta Ringman (born 1949) is a Swedish social democratic politician. She was a member of the Riksdag from 1994 to 2006.
