= Chatrine Pålsson Ahlgren =

Swedish politician (born 1947)

Chatrine Britt Louise Pålsson Ahlgren (born 22 June 1947) is a Swedish Christian Democratic politician. She was a member of the Riksdag from 1991 to 2009.
