= Västra Götaland County West =

Constituency of the Riksdag, the national legislature of Sweden

- Västra Götalands Läns Västra
- Constituency for the Riksdag
- Location of Västra Götaland County West within Sweden
- Municipality: List: Ale; Alingsås; Härryda; Kungälv; Lerum; Lilla Edet; Mölndal; Öckerö; Partille; Stenungsund; Tjörn
- County: Västra Götaland
- Population: 394,150 (2025)
- Electorate: 297,310 (2026)
- Area: 2,881 km^{2} (2026)

Current constituency
- Created: 1970
- Seats: List (Note: Constituency seats only.): 11 (2018–present); 12 (2010–2018); 11 (1985–2010); 10 (1970–1985)
- Member of the Riksdag: List: Anders Ådahl (C); Janine Alm Ericson (MP); Dennis Alvdén (M); Elin Andersson (L); Magnus Berntsson (KD); Katarina Bosetti-Kristoffersson (S); Alexander Christiansson (SD); Gunilla Gomér (SD); Joakim Järrebring (S); Aylin Nouri (S); Carina Örgård (V); Johanna Rantsi (M); Anna Vedin (M)
- Created from: Gothenburg and Bohus County

Västra Götaland County West (Swedish: Västra Götalands Läns Västra) is one of the 29 multi-member constituencies of the Riksdag, the national legislature of Sweden. The constituency was established as Gothenburg and Bohus County Municipality (Swedish: Göteborgs och Bohus läns landstingskommun) in 1970 when the Riksdag changed from a bicameral legislature to a unicameral legislature. It was renamed Bohus County (Swedish: Bohuslän) in 1973. It was renamed Västra Götaland County West in 1998 when the counties of Älvsborg, Gothenburg and Bohus and Skaraborg were merged to create Västra Götaland. The constituency currently consists of the municipalities of Ale, Alingsås, Härryda, Kungälv, Lerum, Lilla Edet, Mölndal, Öckerö, Partille, Stenungsund and Tjörn. The constituency currently elects 11 of the 349 members of the Riksdag using the open party-list proportional representation electoral system. At the 2026 general election it had 297,310 registered electors.

== Electoral system ==
Västra Götaland County West currently elects 11 of the 349 members of the Riksdag using the open party-list proportional representation electoral system. Constituency seats are allocated using the modified Sainte-Laguë method. Only parties that reach the 4% national threshold and parties that receive at least 12% of the vote in the constituency compete for constituency seats. Supplementary levelling seats may also be allocated at the constituency level to parties that reach the 4% national threshold.

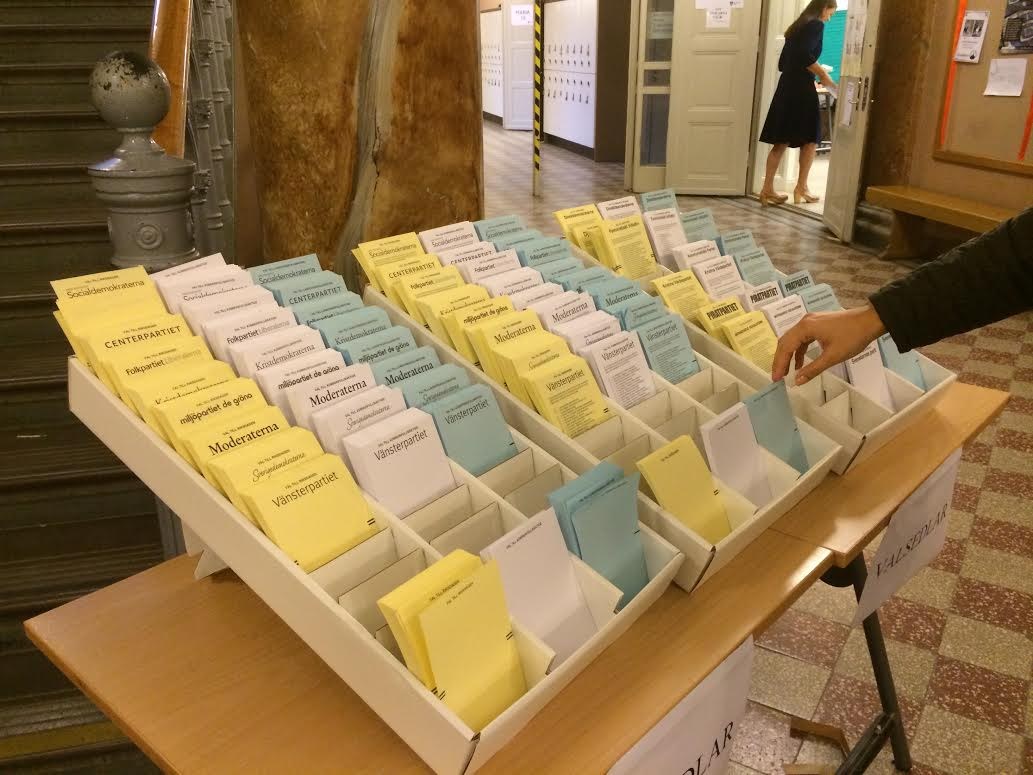
A selection of ballot papers available for voters at the 2014 general election in Stockholm - yellow for the Riksdag, blue for the regional council and white for the municipal council

Prior to 1997 voters could cast any ballot paper they wanted, though it had to contain the name of a party and the name of at least one candidate nominated by that party in the constituency. It was common for parties to hand out ballot papers with their name and list of candidates at the entrance of polling stations. Voters could delete the names of candidates or write-in the names of other candidates but in practice these options weren't used enough by voters to have any significant impact on the results and consequently elections operated as a closed system.

Since 1997, elections in Sweden follow the French model in having separate ballot papers for each party/list in a constituency. There are two ballot papers for each party - a party ballot paper (partivalsedel) with just the name of the party and a name ballot paper (namnvalsedel) with the name of the party and its list of candidates. There are also blank ballot papers (blank valsedel). Voters can initially pick as many ballot papers as they wish and then, in the secrecy of the voting booth, they select a single ballot paper of their choice. If they chose a name ballot paper they have the option of casting a preferential vote for one of their chosen party's candidates. If they chose a blank ballot paper they can write the name of any party including unregistered parties and, optionally, they can write the name of any person as their preferred candidate, even one that does not belong to their chosen party. They then place their chosen ballot paper in an envelope which is placed in the ballot box, discarding all other ballot papers they picked.

Seats won by each party/list in a constituency are allocated to its candidates in order of preference votes (a personal mandate), provided that the candidate has received at least 8% of votes cast for their party in the constituency (5% since January 2011). Any unfilled seats are then allocated to the party's remaining candidates in the order they appear on the party list (a party mandate).

== Election results ==
=== Summary ===
Election	Left V / VPK			Social Democrats S			Greens MP			Centre C			Liberals L / FP / F			Moderates M			Christian Democrats KD / KDS			Sweden Democrats SD		
Election	Votes	%	Seats	Votes	%	Seats	Votes	%	Seats	Votes	%	Seats	Votes	%	Seats	Votes	%	Seats	Votes	%	Seats	Votes	%	Seats
2026	16,417	6.34%	1	65,532	25.30%	2	16,323	6.30%	1	19,093	7.37%	1	16,376	6.32%	1	55,689	21.50%	2	18,690	7.22%	1	47,131	18.20%	2
2022	14,089	5.68%	1	69,468	28.03%	3	12,846	5.18%	0	15,881	6.41%	1	13,467	5.43%	1	50,707	20.46%	2	15,571	6.28%	1	52,558	21.20%	2
2018	16,607	6.83%	1	58,966	24.24%	3	12,166	5.00%	0	19,932	8.19%	1	16,757	6.89%	1	52,958	21.77%	2	18,724	7.70%	1	43,848	18.02%	2
2014	12,132	5.16%	0	63,552	27.05%	3	15,971	6.80%	1	14,091	6.00%	1	16,134	6.87%	1	60,129	25.59%	3	13,486	5.74%	1	31,401	13.37%	2
2010	10,506	4.67%	0	59,477	26.43%	3	15,794	7.02%	1	13,563	6.03%	1	20,194	8.97%	1	73,853	32.82%	4	16,525	7.34%	1	12,504	5.56%	1
2006	10,877	5.24%	0	66,705	32.11%	4	10,086	4.86%	0	15,135	7.29%	1	19,937	9.60%	1	54,970	26.46%	4	18,101	8.71%	1	6,074	2.92%	0
2002	15,389	7.86%	1	72,450	37.00%	5	8,409	4.29%	0	10,556	5.39%	0	31,260	15.96%	2	29,467	15.05%	2	22,831	11.66%	1	3,069	1.57%	0
1998	22,101	11.51%	1	64,784	33.73%	4	8,575	4.46%	0	8,509	4.43%	0	10,758	5.60%	1	41,380	21.55%	3	29,206	15.21%	2			
1994	11,904	5.90%	1	86,079	42.67%	5	11,257	5.58%	0	14,688	7.28%	1	18,077	8.96%	1	44,807	22.21%	3	10,255	5.08%	0			
1991	7,741	3.95%	0	65,706	33.55%	4	6,908	3.53%	0	16,221	8.28%	1	22,662	11.57%	1	43,195	22.05%	3	17,081	8.72%	1			
1988	9,320	4.96%	0	73,744	39.23%	5	12,271	6.53%	1	21,207	11.28%	1	31,064	16.53%	2	32,824	17.46%	2	6,604	3.51%	0			
1985	8,553	4.48%	0	77,075	40.33%	5	3,329	1.74%	0	24,319	12.72%	2	37,468	19.60%	2	39,783	20.82%	2	with C					
1982	8,634	4.63%	0	75,513	40.45%	4	3,263	1.75%	0	30,558	16.37%	2	17,394	9.32%	1	47,197	25.28%	3	3,653	1.96%	0			
1979	7,765	4.34%	0	67,460	37.67%	4				35,395	19.76%	2	27,196	15.19%	2	38,160	21.31%	2	2,137	1.19%	0			
1976	6,473	3.70%	0	65,809	37.59%	4				45,153	25.79%	2	28,454	16.25%	2	27,151	15.51%	2	1,864	1.06%	0			
1973	6,588	4.08%	0	61,139	37.84%	4				40,488	25.06%	2	26,114	16.16%	2	24,500	15.16%	2	2,209	1.37%	0			
1970	5,980	3.84%	0	57,967	37.24%	4				29,294	18.82%	2	41,069	26.38%	3	18,964	12.18%	1	2,003	1.29%	0			

(Excludes levelling seats. Figures in italics represent alliances/joint lists.)

=== Detailed ===
Party has received at least 4% of the vote nationally and is entitled to compete for constituency seats.

==== 2020s ====
===== 2026 =====
Results of the 2026 general election held on 13 September 2026:

Party		Votes per municipality											Total votes	%	Seats		
Party		Ale	Aling- sås	Härryda	Kun- gälv	Lerum	Lilla Edet	Möln- dal	Öckerö	Partille	Stenung- sund	Tjörn	Total votes	%	Con.	Lev.	Tot.
Swedish Social Democratic Party	S	5,625	7,797	6,235	8,593	6,750	2,244	12,461	2,023	6,830	4,506	2,468	65,532	25.30%	2	1	3
Moderate Party	M	3,922	5,326	6,157	7,727	6,604	1,374	10,168	2,005	5,603	4,288	2,515	55,689	21.50%	2	1	3
Sweden Democrats	SD	4,318	4,879	4,518	6,994	4,882	2,643	7,220	1,795	3,693	3,889	2,300	47,131	18.20%	2	0	2
Centre Party	C	1,130	2,249	2,262	2,353	2,311	455	3,727	604	2,076	1,226	700	19,093	7.37%	1	0	1
Christian Democrats	KD	1,247	2,349	1,655	2,404	2,071	577	2,788	1,402	1,592	1,416	1,189	18,690	7.22%	1	0	1
Left Party	V	1,748	1,985	1,279	1,827	1,657	610	3,623	297	2,013	976	402	16,417	6.34%	1	0	1
Liberals	L	883	1,668	1,921	2,200	1,982	300	2,998	646	1,583	1,198	997	16,376	6.32%	1	0	1
Green Party	MP	856	2,064	1,734	1,735	2,286	272	3,529	515	1,829	914	589	16,323	6.30%	1	0	1
Örebro Party	ÖP	99	172	117	146	78	49	228	40	48	66	39	1,082	0.42%	0	0	0
Alternative for Sweden	AfS	116	137	119	140	75	65	164	27	97	80	32	1,052	0.41%	0	0	0
Christian Values Party	KrVP	34	73	12	92	27	5	61	55	33	13	26	431	0.17%	0	0	0
Ambition Sweden	AS	36	44	33	50	39	14	50	6	28	35	21	356	0.14%	0	0	0
Pirate Party	PP	23	30	47	34	34	14	83	3	25	10	10	313	0.12%	0	0	0
Citizens' Coalition	MED	14	6	18	38	17	1	27	7	11	36	7	182	0.07%	0	0	0
Human Rights and Democracy	MoD	16	27	15	10	12	5	12	1	4	12	2	116	0.04%	0	0	0
Direct Democrats	DD	4	6	3	6	2	0	6	1	3	2	0	33	0.01%	0	0	0
Communist Party of Sweden	SKP	2	4	1	2	2	2	3	0	5	6	1	28	0.01%	0	0	0
United Voice	ER	6	1	1	0	3	1	9	1	1	1	1	25	0.01%	0	0	0
Communist Party	K	1	2	2	1	0	0	4	0	4	0	1	15	0.01%	0	0	0
Nuance Party	PNy	1	0	5	0	0	2	3	0	2	0	0	13	0.01%	0	0	0
Nordic Resistance Movement	NMR	1	1	0	7	0	1	2	0	0	0	0	12	0.00%	0	0	0
Donald Duck Party		1	1	0	0	0	1	2	2	1	1	0	9	0.00%	0	0	0
RegleraAI.nu		1	1	2	0	1	0	3	0	0	0	1	9	0.00%	0	0	0
Independent Rural Party	LPo	2	1	0	1	0	0	1	0	2	0	1	8	0.00%	0	0	0
Volt Sweden	Volt	0	1	1	1	1	0	2	1	0	0	0	7	0.00%	0	0	0
Unity	ENH	0	2	1	0	0	0	1	0	0	1	1	6	0.00%	0	0	0
The Push Buttons	Kn	3	0	0	0	0	0	0	0	0	2	0	5	0.00%	0	0	0
Classical Liberal Party	KLP	0	1	0	0	0	0	2	0	0	0	0	3	0.00%	0	0	0
Knowledge-Democratic Party		0	0	0	0	0	0	0	0	2	0	0	2	0.00%	0	0	0
Turning Point Party	PV	0	0	0	0	1	0	1	0	0	0	0	2	0.00%	0	0	0
Vision Party		0	0	1	0	1	0	0	0	0	0	0	2	0.00%	0	0	0
Animal Lovers' Party		0	0	1	0	0	0	0	0	0	0	0	1	0.00%	0	0	0
Conservative Party		0	0	1	0	0	0	0	0	0	0	0	1	0.00%	0	0	0
Evil Chicken Party	OKP	1	0	0	0	0	0	0	0	0	0	0	1	0.00%	0	0	0
Jesus		0	0	0	0	0	0	0	0	0	0	1	1	0.00%	0	0	0
John Party with Extra Moose		0	0	0	1	0	0	0	0	0	0	0	1	0.00%	0	0	0
New Allance		0	0	0	0	0	0	0	0	1	0	0	1	0.00%	0	0	0
O		0	0	0	0	0	0	0	0	1	0	0	1	0.00%	0	0	0
Origin		0	1	0	0	0	0	0	0	0	0	0	1	0.00%	0	0	0
The Anarchists		0	0	0	0	0	0	1	0	0	0	0	1	0.00%	0	0	0
United Sweden		0	0	1	0	0	0	0	0	0	0	0	1	0.00%	0	0	0
Valid votes		20,090	28,828	26,142	34,362	28,836	8,635	47,179	9,431	25,487	18,678	11,304	258,972	100.00%	11	2	13
Blank votes		186	257	207	305	209	107	368	67	189	160	86	2,141	0.82%			
Rejected votes – unregistered parties		3	7	8	9	5	1	12	2	2	5	2	56	0.02%			
Rejected votes – other		9	19	13	24	22	7	18	4	36	9	5	166	0.06%			
Total polled		20,288	29,111	26,370	34,700	29,072	8,750	47,577	9,504	25,714	18,852	11,397	261,335	87.90%			
Registered electors		23,859	33,167	29,538	38,885	32,343	10,613	54,361	10,492	29,898	21,386	12,768	297,310				
Turnout		85.03%	87.77%	89.27%	89.24%	89.89%	82.45%	87.52%	90.58%	86.01%	88.15%	89.26%	87.90%				

The following candidates were elected:

- Constituency seats (party mandates) - Anders Ådahl (C), 661 votes; Janine Alm Ericson (MP), 629 votes; Elin Andersson (L), 646 votes; Magnus Berntsson (KD), 139 votes; Alexander Christiansson (SD), 115 votes; Gunilla Gomér (SD), 9 votes; Joakim Järrebring (S), 844 votes; Aylin Nouri (S), 1,876 votes; Carina Örgård (V), 727 votes; Johanna Rantsi (M), 1,026 votes; and Camilla Waltersson Grönvall (M), 1,330 votes.
- Levelling seats (party mandates) - Katarina Bosetti-Kristoffersson (S), 518 votes; and Anna Vedin (M), 437 votes.

===== 2022 =====
Results of the 2022 general election held on 11 September 2022:

Party		Votes per municipality											Total votes	%	Seats		
Party		Ale	Aling- sås	Härryda	Kun- gälv	Lerum	Lilla Edet	Möln- dal	Öckerö	Partille	Stenung- sund	Tjörn	Total votes	%	Con.	Lev.	Tot.
Swedish Social Democratic Party	S	5,834	8,256	6,776	9,098	7,495	2,502	12,496	2,271	6,826	5,042	2,872	69,468	28.03%	3	0	3
Sweden Democrats	SD	5,015	5,295	5,146	7,359	5,506	3,064	7,820	2,023	4,248	4,328	2,754	52,558	21.20%	2	1	3
Moderate Party	M	3,568	4,979	5,612	6,640	6,105	1,151	9,399	1,810	5,179	4,009	2,255	50,707	20.46%	2	1	3
Centre Party	C	1,029	1,930	1,760	2,028	1,819	423	3,168	442	1,610	1,046	626	15,881	6.41%	1	0	1
Christian Democrats	KD	1,100	2,023	1,244	2,112	1,683	473	2,153	1,294	1,276	1,088	1,125	15,571	6.28%	1	0	1
Left Party	V	1,301	1,811	1,183	1,594	1,498	499	3,087	381	1,551	768	416	14,089	5.68%	1	0	1
Liberals	L	648	1,416	1,558	1,639	1,751	219	2,825	413	1,396	882	720	13,467	5.43%	1	0	1
Green Party	MP	694	1,607	1,401	1,389	1,756	196	2,728	407	1,482	728	458	12,846	5.18%	0	1	1
Alternative for Sweden	AfS	64	75	55	80	48	36	136	21	40	63	25	643	0.26%	0	0	0
Nuance Party	PNy	108	61	22	110	16	23	103	0	83	32	2	560	0.23%	0	0	0
Citizens' Coalition	MED	44	45	62	61	53	20	94	12	43	43	19	496	0.20%	0	0	0
Pirate Party	PP	16	40	18	36	41	15	90	2	29	25	7	319	0.13%	0	0	0
Human Rights and Democracy	MoD	25	57	32	28	25	9	35	5	23	28	7	274	0.11%	0	0	0
Christian Values Party	KrVP	16	40	3	54	20	11	40	49	14	8	17	272	0.11%	0	0	0
The Push Buttons	Kn	11	22	18	30	14	16	26	5	22	28	10	202	0.08%	0	0	0
Feminist Initiative	FI	21	14	13	20	18	5	35	6	5	10	2	149	0.06%	0	0	0
Climate Alliance	KA	3	19	10	20	6	1	12	1	2	5	1	80	0.03%	0	0	0
Unity	ENH	2	6	14	19	8	1	7	0	3	11	2	73	0.03%	0	0	0
Direct Democrats	DD	8	12	3	9	3	3	9	1	0	3	1	52	0.02%	0	0	0
Nordic Resistance Movement	NMR	0	5	2	6	1	0	4	0	3	2	2	25	0.01%	0	0	0
Communist Party of Sweden	SKP	1	2	1	1	0	6	4	0	3	2	0	20	0.01%	0	0	0
Independent Rural Party	LPo	0	6	2	0	0	7	0	0	1	3	1	20	0.01%	0	0	0
Basic Income Party	BASIP	0	2	1	2	8	2	2	1	0	0	1	19	0.01%	0	0	0
United Democratic Party		5	0	2	0	0	1	4	0	2	0	0	14	0.01%	0	0	0
Classical Liberal Party	KLP	1	2	4	0	1	0	2	0	1	0	1	12	0.00%	0	0	0
Donald Duck Party		1	1	1	1	0	1	2	1	0	0	0	8	0.00%	0	0	0
Turning Point Party	PV	0	3	1	0	3	0	1	0	0	0	0	8	0.00%	0	0	0
Hard Line Sweden		0	2	0	1	0	0	2	0	0	0	0	5	0.00%	0	0	0
Socialist Welfare Party	S-V	0	0	0	0	0	0	1	0	0	0	3	4	0.00%	0	0	0
Volt Sweden	Volt	1	1	0	0	0	0	0	1	0	0	1	4	0.00%	0	0	0
Freedom Party		0	0	0	2	0	0	1	0	0	0	0	3	0.00%	0	0	0
Political Shift		1	0	0	0	2	0	0	0	0	0	0	3	0.00%	0	0	0
Change Party Revolution		0	0	0	0	0	0	0	0	1	0	0	1	0.00%	0	0	0
Electoral Cooperation Party		0	0	0	0	1	0	0	0	0	0	0	1	0.00%	0	0	0
Evil Chicken Party	OKP	0	0	1	0	0	0	0	0	0	0	0	1	0.00%	0	0	0
Humanist Democracy	HD	0	0	1	0	0	0	0	0	0	0	0	1	0.00%	0	0	0
Naturist Party		0	1	0	0	0	0	0	0	0	0	0	1	0.00%	0	0	0
NY Reform	NR	0	0	0	0	0	0	0	0	1	0	0	1	0.00%	0	0	0
Scania Party	SKÅ	0	1	0	0	0	0	0	0	0	0	0	1	0.00%	0	0	0
Social Libertarians		0	0	0	1	0	0	0	0	0	0	0	1	0.00%	0	0	0
Sweden Party		0	0	1	0	0	0	0	0	0	0	0	1	0.00%	0	0	0
Swexit Party		0	0	0	0	0	0	0	0	1	0	0	1	0.00%	0	0	0
The Anarchists		0	0	0	0	0	0	1	0	0	0	0	1	0.00%	0	0	0
Valid votes		19,517	27,734	24,947	32,340	27,881	8,684	44,287	9,146	23,845	18,154	11,328	247,863	100.00%	11	3	14
Blank votes		180	251	201	305	257	101	406	81	205	179	97	2,263	0.90%			
Rejected votes – unregistered parties		6	9	13	4	4	2	9	0	6	2	6	61	0.02%			
Rejected votes – other		27	10	17	20	23	9	21	5	17	15	10	174	0.07%			
Total polled		19,730	28,004	25,178	32,669	28,165	8,796	44,723	9,232	24,073	18,350	11,441	250,361	87.56%			
Registered electors		23,187	31,871	28,334	36,928	31,378	10,601	51,607	10,173	28,286	20,770	12,792	285,927				
Turnout		85.09%	87.87%	88.86%	88.47%	89.76%	82.97%	86.66%	90.75%	85.11%	88.35%	89.44%	87.56%				

The following candidates were elected:

- Constituency seats (personal mandates) - Roland Utbult (KD), 785 votes; and Jessica Wetterling (V), 840 votes.
- Constituency seats (party mandates) - Anders Ådahl (C), 588 votes; Alexander Christiansson (SD), 127 votes; Rashid Farivar (SD), 56 votes; Aylin Fazelian (S), 946 votes; Kenneth G. Forslund (S), 1,228 votes; Helena Gellerman (L), 493 votes; Joakim Järrebring (S), 749 votes; Ellen Juntti (M), 427 votes; and Camilla Waltersson Grönvall (M), 1,240 votes.
- Levelling seats (party mandates) - Janine Alm Ericson (MP), 418 votes; Yasmine Eriksson (SD), 141 votes; and Johanna Rantsi (M), 839 votes.

==== 2010s ====
===== 2018 =====
Results of the 2018 general election held on 9 September 2018:

Party		Votes per municipality											Total votes	%	Seats		
Party		Ale	Aling- sås	Härryda	Kun- gälv	Lerum	Lilla Edet	Möln- dal	Öckerö	Partille	Stenung- sund	Tjörn	Total votes	%	Con.	Lev.	Tot.
Swedish Social Democratic Party	S	5,401	7,268	5,211	7,603	6,159	2,478	10,551	1,710	5,727	4,543	2,315	58,966	24.24%	3	0	3
Moderate Party	M	3,639	5,047	5,791	6,702	6,441	1,239	9,891	2,012	5,587	4,175	2,434	52,958	21.77%	2	1	3
Sweden Democrats	SD	4,301	4,221	4,272	5,616	4,654	2,568	6,960	1,606	3,933	3,375	2,342	43,848	18.02%	2	0	2
Centre Party	C	1,358	2,696	2,251	2,624	2,346	582	3,541	494	1,899	1,279	862	19,932	8.19%	1	0	1
Christian Democrats	KD	1,212	2,369	1,570	2,327	2,015	445	2,761	1,783	1,665	1,195	1,382	18,724	7.70%	1	0	1
Liberals	L	914	1,857	1,969	1,829	2,038	324	3,620	605	1,731	1,092	778	16,757	6.89%	1	0	1
Left Party	V	1,478	2,149	1,409	1,875	1,797	629	3,351	452	1,951	943	573	16,607	6.83%	1	0	1
Green Party	MP	759	1,590	1,342	1,290	1,561	247	2,537	422	1,279	711	428	12,166	5.00%	0	1	1
Feminist Initiative	FI	59	116	96	114	120	21	208	20	87	52	46	939	0.39%	0	0	0
Alternative for Sweden	AfS	60	83	103	79	57	29	149	7	52	42	26	687	0.28%	0	0	0
Citizens' Coalition	MED	34	41	62	61	47	14	101	16	41	39	17	473	0.19%	0	0	0
Pirate Party	PP	13	43	15	15	35	7	73	9	49	6	7	272	0.11%	0	0	0
Direct Democrats	DD	19	29	18	20	22	10	34	14	12	5	9	192	0.08%	0	0	0
Animal Party	DjuP	22	13	21	7	9	11	60	1	20	3	14	181	0.07%	0	0	0
Unity	ENH	17	19	27	23	17	5	27	1	7	22	6	171	0.07%	0	0	0
Nordic Resistance Movement	NMR	12	7	12	27	9	6	13	1	9	8	3	107	0.04%	0	0	0
Christian Values Party	KrVP	12	6	2	10	3	1	18	14	16	4	6	92	0.04%	0	0	0
Independent Rural Party	LPo	8	5	3	14	8	9	0	1	3	10	9	70	0.03%	0	0	0
Classical Liberal Party	KLP	7	3	3	11	8	0	17	0	2	4	1	56	0.02%	0	0	0
Basic Income Party	BASIP	3	0	2	2	5	3	14	1	1	1	1	33	0.01%	0	0	0
Communist Party of Sweden	SKP	2	3	0	0	0	2	3	0	1	0	0	11	0.00%	0	0	0
Initiative	INI	0	4	1	0	3	0	2	0	1	0	0	11	0.00%	0	0	0
Security Party	TRP	0	0	0	0	0	0	1	0	0	0	0	1	0.00%	0	0	0
Parties not on the ballot		0	2	1	5	6	1	1	1	7	0	0	24	0.01%	0	0	0
Valid votes		19,330	27,571	24,181	30,254	27,360	8,631	43,933	9,170	24,080	17,509	11,259	243,278	100.00%	11	2	13
Blank votes		218	223	173	249	249	78	354	65	190	161	84	2,044	0.83%			
Rejected votes – unregistered parties		10	7	12	10	8	21	13	1	13	6	2	103	0.04%			
Rejected votes – other		9	19	4	6	8	1	21	5	7	10	5	95	0.04%			
Total polled		19,567	27,820	24,370	30,519	27,625	8,731	44,321	9,241	24,290	17,686	11,350	245,520	89.62%			
Registered electors		22,266	30,990	26,845	33,697	30,271	10,291	49,659	10,072	27,649	19,673	12,552	273,965				
Turnout		87.88%	89.77%	90.78%	90.57%	91.26%	84.84%	89.25%	91.75%	87.85%	89.90%	90.42%	89.62%				

The following candidates were elected:

- Constituency seats (personal mandates) - Jessica Wetterling (V), 997 votes.
- Constituency seats (party mandates) - Aron Emilsson (SD), 83 votes; Aylin Fazelian (S), 1,005 votes; Kenneth G. Forslund (S), 1,272 votes; Helena Gellerman (L), 729 votes; Joakim Järrebring (S), 934 votes; Ellen Juntti (M), 1,032 votes; Annika Qarlsson (C), 733 votes; Charlotte Quensel (SD), 1 vote, Roland Utbult (KD), 645 votes; and Camilla Waltersson Grönvall (M), 1,213 votes.
- Levelling seats (party mandates) - Janine Alm Ericson (MP), 552 votes; and Sofia Westergren (M), 1,011 votes.

===== 2014 =====
Results of the 2014 general election held on 14 September 2014:

Party		Votes per municipality														Total votes	%	Seats		
Party		Härryda	Kun- gälv	Lysekil	Möln- dal	Munke- dal	Öckerö	Orust	Partille	Sote- näs	Stenung- sund	Ström- stad	Tanum	Tjörn	Udde- valla	Total votes	%	Con.	Lev.	Tot.
Swedish Social Democratic Party	S	5,222	7,760	3,451	10,265	2,090	1,783	2,893	5,778	1,848	4,562	1,876	1,943	2,363	11,718	63,552	27.05%	3	0	3
Moderate Party	M	6,829	7,527	1,754	10,369	1,281	2,636	2,580	6,346	1,997	4,712	1,602	2,310	3,080	7,106	60,129	25.59%	3	0	3
Sweden Democrats	SD	2,913	3,921	1,549	4,695	1,262	921	1,604	2,698	788	2,276	941	974	1,512	5,347	31,401	13.37%	2	0	2
Liberal People's Party	FP	1,905	1,910	604	3,395	211	602	627	1,863	421	1,082	509	551	803	1,651	16,134	6.87%	1	0	1
Green Party	MP	1,843	1,850	566	3,688	209	461	571	1,857	235	1,053	532	428	582	2,096	15,971	6.80%	1	0	1
Centre Party	C	1,437	1,904	517	2,054	640	249	904	1,047	329	975	663	1,108	585	1,679	14,091	6.00%	1	0	1
Christian Democrats	KD	1,130	1,643	412	2,165	330	1,477	478	1,253	345	726	286	311	1,078	1,852	13,486	5.74%	1	0	1
Left Party	V	1,059	1,399	594	2,337	362	346	557	1,422	250	702	319	329	372	2,084	12,132	5.16%	0	1	1
Feminist Initiative	FI	601	645	240	1,260	116	197	272	696	109	335	182	263	226	836	5,978	2.54%	0	0	0
Pirate Party	PP	103	113	23	235	19	24	41	133	15	64	25	33	32	131	991	0.42%	0	0	0
Unity	ENH	38	51	12	36	6	5	14	10	2	21	6	7	14	51	273	0.12%	0	0	0
Christian Values Party	KrVP	3	11	2	20	14	14	2	12	1	2	2	0	12	52	147	0.06%	0	0	0
Party of the Swedes	SVP	19	18	3	34	3	0	4	20	4	9	3	9	3	12	141	0.06%	0	0	0
Animal Party	DjuP	14	13	3	26	0	1	4	33	1	4	4	1	1	18	123	0.05%	0	0	0
Direct Democrats	DD	8	11	10	19	3	2	1	3	0	4	2	6	2	7	78	0.03%	0	0	0
Independent Rural Party	LPo	0	7	1	1	15	0	1	1	1	5	1	6	1	5	45	0.02%	0	0	0
Crossroads		5	9	0	5	0	4	2	3	0	7	0	0	4	1	40	0.02%	0	0	0
Swedish Senior Citizen Interest Party	SPI	2	0	0	1	1	0	0	26	0	1	0	0	0	0	31	0.01%	0	0	0
Classical Liberal Party	KLP	2	0	4	10	0	0	0	3	0	4	0	0	1	5	29	0.01%	0	0	0
Communist Party of Sweden	SKP	0	2	0	1	0	0	0	2	0	0	0	0	0	14	19	0.01%	0	0	0
Peace Democrats	FD	0	0	0	0	0	0	0	16	1	0	0	0	0	0	17	0.01%	0	0	0
Health Party		2	0	0	1	0	0	1	2	0	0	0	2	0	0	8	0.00%	0	0	0
Socialist Justice Party	RS	1	1	0	1	0	0	0	0	0	0	0	0	0	2	5	0.00%	0	0	0
European Workers Party	EAP	1	0	0	2	0	1	0	0	0	0	0	0	0	0	4	0.00%	0	0	0
Progressive Party		0	0	0	0	0	0	2	1	0	0	0	1	0	0	4	0.00%	0	0	0
Parties not on the ballot		15	23	1	17	2	2	1	17	3	11	3	3	2	16	116	0.05%	0	0	0
Valid votes		23,152	28,818	9,746	40,637	6,564	8,725	10,559	23,242	6,350	16,555	6,956	8,285	10,673	34,683	234,945	100.00%	12	1	13
Blank votes		213	249	92	416	79	117	133	183	68	161	64	116	103	448	2,442	1.03%			
Rejected votes – other		4	7	0	13	1	1	5	4	1	3	2	1	6	9	57	0.02%			
Total polled		23,369	29,074	9,838	41,066	6,644	8,843	10,697	23,429	6,419	16,719	7,022	8,402	10,782	35,140	237,444	87.18%			
Registered electors		26,163	32,626	11,549	46,911	7,946	9,859	12,288	27,007	7,432	18,989	8,627	9,821	12,150	41,002	272,370				
Turnout		89.32%	89.11%	85.18%	87.54%	83.61%	89.69%	87.05%	86.75%	86.37%	88.05%	81.40%	85.55%	88.74%	85.70%	87.18%				

The following candidates were elected:

- Constituency seats (personal mandates) - Fredrik Christensson (C), 1,054 votes; Emma Nohrén (MP), 1,225 votes; and Roland Utbult (KD), 1,556 votes.
- Constituency seats (party mandates) - Catharina Bråkenhielm (S), 1,346 votes; Kenneth G. Forslund (S), 979 votes; Ellen Juntti (M), 717 votes; Jan-Olof Larsson (S), 1,647 votes; Maria Plass (M), 722 votes; Lars-Arne Staxäng (M), 1,521 votes; Lars Tysklind (FP), 721 votes; and Tony Wiklander (SD), 1 vote.
- Levelling seats (party mandates) - Wiwi-Anne Johansson (V), 457 votes.

Permanent substitutions:

- Jan-Olof Larsson (S) resigned on 9 January 2017 and was replaced by Petra Ekerum (S) on 10 January 2017.
- Wiwi-Anne Johansson (V) resigned on 31 October 2017 and was replaced by Hamza Demir (V) on 1 November 2017.

===== 2010 =====
Results of the 2010 general election held on 19 September 2010:

Party		Votes per municipality														Total votes	%	Seats		
Party		Härryda	Kun- gälv	Lysekil	Möln- dal	Munke- dal	Öckerö	Orust	Partille	Sote- näs	Stenung- sund	Ström- stad	Tanum	Tjörn	Udde- valla	Total votes	%	Con.	Lev.	Tot.
Moderate Party	M	7,796	9,134	2,482	12,807	1,663	3,045	3,532	7,495	2,453	5,609	1,910	2,579	3,725	9,623	73,853	32.82%	4	0	4
Swedish Social Democratic Party	S	4,697	7,156	3,551	9,667	2,092	1,595	2,669	5,485	1,707	4,014	1,826	1,737	2,104	11,177	59,477	26.43%	3	0	3
Liberal People's Party	FP	2,248	2,490	973	4,008	339	690	870	2,213	512	1,330	561	730	1,019	2,211	20,194	8.97%	1	0	1
Christian Democrats	KD	1,376	1,965	454	2,542	448	1,627	661	1,562	502	971	342	455	1,362	2,258	16,525	7.34%	1	0	1
Green Party	MP	1,631	1,740	633	3,326	250	497	668	1,690	272	1,099	552	494	609	2,333	15,794	7.02%	1	0	1
Centre Party	C	1,286	1,817	409	1,854	753	237	920	892	286	924	711	1,213	578	1,683	13,563	6.03%	1	0	1
Sweden Democrats	SD	1,212	1,707	560	2,185	458	381	492	1,291	261	754	295	344	518	2,046	12,504	5.56%	1	0	1
Left Party	V	990	1,217	540	2,060	327	261	494	1,137	235	646	275	271	309	1,744	10,506	4.67%	0	1	1
Pirate Party	PP	157	159	52	323	29	46	57	161	21	101	40	37	52	169	1,404	0.62%	0	0	0
Feminist Initiative	FI	74	100	30	172	16	40	55	100	15	43	9	30	29	130	843	0.37%	0	0	0
Swedish Senior Citizen Interest Party	SPI	2	1	0	4	1	0	4	91	1	40	0	0	10	1	155	0.07%	0	0	0
Socialist Justice Party	RS	0	0	0	0	0	0	0	2	0	0	0	0	0	36	38	0.02%	0	0	0
National Democrats	ND	1	5	1	2	3	0	0	2	0	1	0	1	3	3	22	0.01%	0	0	0
Unity	ENH	5	0	1	2	0	0	2	1	0	3	0	1	0	4	19	0.01%	0	0	0
Classical Liberal Party	KLP	0	1	0	6	0	0	1	5	0	0	0	1	0	1	15	0.01%	0	0	0
Freedom Party		5	0	1	3	0	0	1	0	1	0	0	0	0	0	11	0.00%	0	0	0
Party of the Swedes	SVP	3	1	0	1	0	0	1	1	0	2	1	0	0	1	11	0.00%	0	0	0
Rural Democrats		0	0	0	0	3	0	0	0	0	0	0	4	1	2	10	0.00%	0	0	0
Spirits Party		2	0	0	2	0	0	0	1	1	1	0	0	0	0	7	0.00%	0	0	0
Health Care Party	Sjvåp	0	1	0	2	0	0	0	1	1	0	0	0	0	0	5	0.00%	0	0	0
Active Democracy		0	0	0	3	0	0	0	0	0	0	0	0	0	1	4	0.00%	0	0	0
European Workers Party	EAP	0	0	0	2	0	0	0	0	0	0	2	0	0	0	4	0.00%	0	0	0
Alliance Party / Citizen's Voice	ALP	0	1	0	0	0	0	0	0	0	0	0	0	0	0	1	0.00%	0	0	0
Communist Party of Sweden	SKP	1	0	0	0	0	0	0	0	0	0	0	0	0	0	1	0.00%	0	0	0
Parties not on the ballot		5	7	1	10	5	3	4	6	1	8	3	4	2	12	71	0.03%	0	0	0
Valid votes		21,491	27,502	9,688	38,981	6,387	8,422	10,431	22,136	6,269	15,546	6,527	7,901	10,321	33,435	225,037	100.00%	12	1	13
Blank votes		236	328	128	406	89	112	150	210	70	213	118	124	133	368	2,685	1.18%			
Rejected votes – other		2	13	0	11	2	2	2	9	1	6	1	3	3	14	69	0.03%			
Total polled		21,729	27,843	9,816	39,398	6,478	8,536	10,583	22,355	6,340	15,765	6,646	8,028	10,457	33,817	227,791	86.07%			
Registered electors		24,675	31,549	11,657	45,556	7,893	9,553	12,344	25,730	7,464	18,202	8,410	9,754	11,957	39,922	264,666				
Turnout		88.06%	88.25%	84.21%	86.48%	82.07%	89.35%	85.73%	86.88%	84.94%	86.61%	79.02%	82.30%	87.46%	84.71%	86.07%				

The following candidates were elected:

- Constituency seats (personal mandates) - Åsa Torstensson (C), 1,510 votes; and Roland Utbult (KD), 2,709 votes.
- Constituency seats (party mandates) - Catharina Bråkenhielm (S), 1,388 votes; Stefan Caplan (M), 1,255 votes; Tina Ehn (MP), 798 votes; Kenneth G. Forslund (S), 942 votes; Ellen Juntti (M), 1,046 votes; Jan-Olof Larsson (S), 1,628 votes; Maria Plass (M), 1,537 votes; Johnny Skalin (SD), 2 votes; Lars-Arne Staxäng (M), 2,464 votes; and Lars Tysklind (FP), 1,014 votes.
- Levelling seats (party mandates) - Wiwi-Anne Johansson (V), 490 votes.

==== 2000s ====
===== 2006 =====
Results of the 2006 general election held on 17 September 2006:

Party		Votes per municipality														Total votes	%	Seats		
Party		Härryda	Kun- gälv	Lysekil	Möln- dal	Munke- dal	Öckerö	Orust	Partille	Sote- näs	Stenung- sund	Ström- stad	Tanum	Tjörn	Udde- valla	Total votes	%	Con.	Lev.	Tot.
Swedish Social Democratic Party	S	5,620	8,192	3,975	10,801	2,316	1,922	3,027	6,158	1,929	4,420	2,068	1,874	2,416	11,987	66,705	32.11%	4	0	4
Moderate Party	M	5,711	6,516	1,918	10,030	1,214	2,271	2,517	5,726	1,837	3,907	1,322	1,991	2,871	7,139	54,970	26.46%	4	0	4
Liberal People's Party	FP	2,056	2,173	950	4,190	354	743	783	2,163	626	1,269	590	649	1,080	2,311	19,937	9.60%	1	0	1
Christian Democrats	KD	1,421	2,165	553	2,756	483	1,733	784	1,707	589	1,030	382	528	1,546	2,424	18,101	8.71%	1	0	1
Centre Party	C	1,339	1,961	445	2,015	860	268	1,139	931	387	1,040	832	1,409	618	1,891	15,135	7.29%	1	0	1
Left Party	V	1,050	1,261	510	2,217	286	326	495	1,242	223	710	299	259	387	1,612	10,877	5.24%	0	1	1
Green Party	MP	1,055	1,116	432	1,982	198	357	467	1,058	201	708	317	352	407	1,436	10,086	4.86%	0	1	1
Sweden Democrats	SD	523	863	233	1,176	200	181	255	571	131	372	106	160	193	1,110	6,074	2.92%	0	0	0
Feminist Initiative	FI	120	173	47	329	8	70	68	135	27	106	33	49	58	192	1,415	0.68%	0	0	0
Pirate Party	PP	143	146	45	271	26	49	50	136	31	122	27	35	51	193	1,325	0.64%	0	0	0
June List		106	127	73	159	34	40	36	107	37	74	27	49	37	175	1,081	0.52%	0	0	0
Swedish Senior Citizen Interest Party	SPI	54	24	41	56	10	5	66	251	6	229	8	14	37	59	860	0.41%	0	0	0
Health Care Party	Sjvåp	48	70	39	50	49	29	64	46	58	40	20	39	25	260	837	0.40%	0	0	0
Unity	ENH	5	3	3	11	1	1	6	3	1	18	3	4	1	17	77	0.04%	0	0	0
People's Will		7	12	0	1	4	0	7	0	1	1	3	8	3	13	60	0.03%	0	0	0
National Socialist Front		3	1	1	4	1	0	4	3	0	8	4	0	0	12	41	0.02%	0	0	0
National Democrats	ND	1	3	2	9	0	2	2	5	0	0	1	2	3	5	35	0.02%	0	0	0
New Future	NYF	1	10	1	0	2	0	0	0	0	1	5	0	0	0	20	0.01%	0	0	0
Unique Party		3	11	0	0	0	0	0	3	0	0	0	0	0	0	17	0.01%	0	0	0
Socialist Justice Party	RS	1	0	0	3	0	0	0	1	0	0	0	0	0	5	10	0.00%	0	0	0
Active Democracy		0	0	0	1	0	0	0	3	0	0	0	0	0	1	5	0.00%	0	0	0
Classical Liberal Party	KLP	1	0	0	1	0	0	0	1	0	0	0	0	0	2	5	0.00%	0	0	0
Kvinnokraft		0	0	0	0	0	0	0	0	0	0	1	0	1	0	2	0.00%	0	0	0
Nordic Union		0	1	0	0	0	0	0	0	1	0	0	0	0	0	2	0.00%	0	0	0
National Householders	Riksh	0	0	0	0	0	0	0	0	0	0	0	0	0	2	2	0.00%	0	0	0
The Communists	KOMM	0	0	0	0	0	0	0	0	0	0	0	0	0	1	1	0.00%	0	0	0
European Workers Party	EAP	0	0	0	1	0	0	0	0	0	0	0	0	0	0	1	0.00%	0	0	0
Other parties		4	4	1	15	0	0	3	0	2	1	0	1	0	6	37	0.02%	0	0	0
Valid votes		19,272	24,832	9,269	36,078	6,046	7,997	9,773	20,250	6,087	14,056	6,048	7,423	9,734	30,853	207,718	100.00%	11	2	13
Blank votes		341	459	182	635	160	153	190	273	100	256	127	189	166	625	3,856	1.82%			
Rejected votes – other		7	6	4	15	3	1	3	12	1	2	2	6	1	13	76	0.04%			
Total polled		19,620	25,297	9,455	36,728	6,209	8,151	9,966	20,535	6,188	14,314	6,177	7,618	9,901	31,491	211,650	83.56%			
Registered electors		22,879	29,369	11,575	43,645	7,895	9,250	11,997	24,340	7,535	17,093	8,151	9,513	11,616	38,448	253,306				
Turnout		85.76%	86.14%	81.68%	84.15%	78.64%	88.12%	83.07%	84.37%	82.12%	83.74%	75.78%	80.08%	85.24%	81.91%	83.56%				

The following candidates were elected:

- Constituency seats (personal mandates) - Åsa Torstensson (C), 1,735 votes.
- Constituency seats (party mandates) - Catharina Bråkenhielm (S), 1,290 votes; Birgitta Eriksson (S), 599 votes; Kenneth G. Forslund (S), 1,064 votes; Jan-Olof Larsson (S), 1,409 votes; Kent Olsson (M), 326 votes; Maria Plass (M), 957 votes; Inger René (M), 612 votes; Rosita Runegrund (KD), 1,090 votes; Lars-Arne Staxäng (M), 2,254 votes; and Lars Tysklind (FP), 830 votes.
- Levelling seats (party mandates) - Tina Ehn (MP), 510 votes; and Wiwi-Anne Johansson (V), 416 votes.

===== 2002 =====
Results of the 2002 general election held on 15 September 2002:

Party		Votes per municipality														Total votes	%	Seats		
Party		Härryda	Kun- gälv	Lysekil	Möln- dal	Munke- dal	Öckerö	Orust	Partille	Sote- näs	Stenung- sund	Ström- stad	Tanum	Tjörn	Udde- valla	Total votes	%	Con.	Lev.	Tot.
Swedish Social Democratic Party	S	6,054	8,972	4,465	11,990	2,421	2,076	3,229	6,702	2,302	4,706	2,188	2,042	2,639	12,664	72,450	37.00%	5	0	5
Liberal People's Party	FP	3,345	3,467	1,403	6,482	542	1,006	1,327	3,740	880	2,075	728	994	1,613	3,658	31,260	15.96%	2	0	2
Moderate Party	M	3,050	3,518	1,042	5,433	640	1,410	1,326	3,171	1,125	2,016	793	1,013	1,481	3,449	29,467	15.05%	2	0	2
Christian Democrats	KD	1,699	2,835	640	3,319	728	2,039	1,023	2,186	629	1,419	433	732	2,019	3,130	22,831	11.66%	1	0	1
Left Party	V	1,368	1,760	690	3,039	421	462	732	1,754	345	855	387	410	498	2,668	15,389	7.86%	1	0	1
Centre Party	C	694	1,411	339	1,015	845	134	846	371	273	646	786	1,298	347	1,551	10,556	5.39%	0	1	1
Green Party	MP	909	936	406	1,481	195	276	420	869	198	527	302	349	341	1,200	8,409	4.29%	0	1	1
Sweden Democrats	SD	272	275	107	673	130	50	118	278	57	159	32	40	174	704	3,069	1.57%	0	0	0
Swedish Senior Citizen Interest Party	SPI	256	32	8	511	2	8	19	249	4	131	3	9	56	42	1,330	0.68%	0	0	0
New Future	NYF	7	70	18	5	68	11	11	25	29	28	18	55	0	82	427	0.22%	0	0	0
Socialist Party	SOC.P	5	2	0	11	0	0	0	1	1	0	0	0	0	32	52	0.03%	0	0	0
Norrbotten Party	NBP	0	3	3	2	1	0	4	1	3	1	1	0	0	6	25	0.01%	0	0	0
The Communists	KOMM	0	1	1	9	0	0	0	5	0	0	0	0	0	6	22	0.01%	0	0	0
Unity	ENH	1	1	0	2	0	2	1	1	0	10	0	0	0	0	18	0.01%	0	0	0
National Householders	Riksh	0	0	0	0	0	0	2	0	0	0	0	0	0	0	2	0.00%	0	0	0
European Workers Party	EAP	0	0	0	0	0	0	0	1	0	0	0	0	0	0	1	0.00%	0	0	0
Tax Reformists	Sref	0	0	0	0	0	1	0	0	0	0	0	0	0	0	1	0.00%	0	0	0
Other parties		37	54	11	189	7	7	10	31	31	28	15	38	15	34	507	0.26%	0	0	0
Valid votes		17,697	23,337	9,133	34,161	6,000	7,482	9,068	19,385	5,877	12,601	5,686	6,980	9,183	29,226	195,816	100.00%	11	2	13
Rejected votes		313	338	178	492	97	115	128	292	108	237	95	170	149	428	3,140	1.58%			
Total polled		18,010	23,675	9,311	34,653	6,097	7,597	9,196	19,677	5,985	12,838	5,781	7,150	9,332	29,654	198,956	81.28%			
Registered electors		21,700	28,138	11,506	42,007	7,942	8,949	11,502	23,729	7,554	15,830	8,024	9,309	11,247	37,327	244,764				
Turnout		83.00%	84.14%	80.92%	82.49%	76.77%	84.89%	79.95%	82.92%	79.23%	81.10%	72.05%	76.81%	82.97%	79.44%	81.28%				

The following candidates were elected:

- Constituency seats (personal mandates) - Marita Aronson (FP), 3,084 votes; Lars Bäckström (V), 1,253 votes; and Rosita Runegrund (KD), 2,314 votes.
- Constituency seats (party mandates) - Mona Berglund Nilsson (S), 2,024 votes; Catharina Bråkenhielm (S), 1,242 votes; Kenneth G. Forslund (S), 1,799 votes; Jan-Olof Larsson (S), 1,880 votes; Lennart Nilsson (S), 3,269 votes; Kent Olsson (M), 913 votes; Inger René (M), 1,423 votes; and Lars Tysklind (FP), 681 votes.
- Levelling seats (personal mandates) - Åsa Torstensson (C), 2,598 votes.
- Levelling seats (party mandates) - Mona Jönsson (MP), 524 votes.

==== 1990s ====
===== 1998 =====
Results of the 1998 general election held on 20 September 1998:

Party		Votes per municipality														Total votes	%	Seats		
Party		Härryda	Kun- gälv	Lysekil	Möln- dal	Munke- dal	Öckerö	Orust	Partille	Sote- näs	Stenung- sund	Ström- stad	Tanum	Tjörn	Udde- valla	Total votes	%	Con.	Lev.	Tot.
Swedish Social Democratic Party	S	5,387	7,762	4,263	10,327	2,266	1,887	2,832	5,801	2,245	3,943	2,150	1,803	2,248	11,870	64,784	33.73%	4	0	4
Moderate Party	M	4,307	4,938	1,478	7,669	962	1,612	1,912	4,623	1,424	2,712	1,134	1,491	2,048	5,070	41,380	21.55%	3	0	3
Christian Democrats	KD	2,391	3,505	874	4,405	963	2,109	1,463	2,899	885	1,768	684	1,058	2,297	3,905	29,206	15.21%	2	0	2
Left Party	V	1,923	2,523	1,142	3,876	771	656	1,144	2,364	504	1,340	559	663	670	3,966	22,101	11.51%	1	0	1
Liberal People's Party	FP	1,057	1,039	597	2,178	183	397	476	1,246	352	690	269	399	669	1,206	10,758	5.60%	1	0	1
Green Party	MP	821	1,004	464	1,380	267	322	375	829	235	501	304	419	332	1,322	8,575	4.46%	0	1	1
Centre Party	C	545	1,219	324	773	722	95	685	304	228	512	569	1,013	249	1,271	8,509	4.43%	0	1	1
Other parties		637	460	124	2,200	155	143	203	795	108	284	88	120	298	1,131	6,746	3.51%	0	0	0
Valid votes		17,068	22,450	9,266	32,808	6,289	7,221	9,090	18,861	5,981	11,750	5,757	6,966	8,811	29,741	192,059	100.00%	11	2	13
Rejected votes		406	485	227	728	136	134	175	377	145	279	137	210	185	643	4,267	2.17%			
Total polled		17,474	22,935	9,493	33,536	6,425	7,355	9,265	19,238	6,126	12,029	5,894	7,176	8,996	30,384	196,326	82.59%			
Registered electors		20,606	27,009	11,579	40,340	8,079	8,665	11,385	23,027	7,544	14,651	7,917	9,203	10,828	36,876	237,709				
Turnout		84.80%	84.92%	81.98%	83.13%	79.53%	84.88%	81.38%	83.55%	81.20%	82.10%	74.45%	77.97%	83.08%	82.40%	82.59%				

The following candidates were elected:

- Constituency seats (personal mandates) - Lars Bäckström (V), 1,915 votes; and Kenth Skårvik (FP), 1,032 votes.
- Constituency seats (party mandates) - Berit Adolfsson (M), 1,142 votes; Mona Berglund Nilsson (S), 1,661 votes; Lisbet Calner (S), 2,037 votes; Åke Carnerö (KD), 1,275 votes; Märta Johansson (S), 1,216 votes; Lennart Nilsson (S), 3,159 votes; Kent Olsson (M), 1,317 votes; Inger René (M), 2,573 votes; and Rosita Runegrund (KD), 1,122 votes.
- Levelling seats (personal mandates) - Åsa Torstensson (C), 1,016 votes.
- Levelling seats (party mandates) - Per Lager (MP), 663 votes.

===== 1994 =====
Results of the 1994 general election held on 18 September 1994:

Party		Votes per municipality														Total votes	%	Seats		
Party		Härryda	Kun- gälv	Lysekil	Möln- dal	Munke- dal	Öckerö	Orust	Partille	Sote- näs	Stenung- sund	Ström- stad	Tanum	Tjörn	Udde- valla	Total votes	%	Con.	Lev.	Tot.
Swedish Social Democratic Party	S	6,993	9,945	5,542	14,313	3,124	2,501	3,824	7,950	2,979	5,084	2,811	2,430	3,040	15,543	86,079	42.67%	5	0	5
Moderate Party	M	4,419	5,267	1,623	8,146	1,160	1,835	2,079	5,186	1,433	2,866	1,220	1,723	2,430	5,420	44,807	22.21%	3	0	3
Liberal People's Party	FP	1,842	1,858	859	3,697	329	654	806	2,210	634	1,123	433	630	959	2,043	18,077	8.96%	1	0	1
Centre Party	C	1,002	2,014	515	1,547	1,107	234	1,171	726	424	916	861	1,494	552	2,125	14,688	7.28%	1	0	1
Left Party	V	1,034	1,414	613	2,219	359	324	599	1,348	272	634	310	305	334	2,139	11,904	5.90%	1	0	1
Green Party	MP	1,089	1,234	516	1,664	441	380	575	1,042	355	734	405	581	470	1,771	11,257	5.58%	0	1	1
Christian Democratic Unity	KDS	761	1,136	248	1,520	296	1,327	344	1,086	265	512	205	243	1,004	1,308	10,255	5.08%	0	1	1
New Democracy	NyD	291	296	119	526	93	96	170	333	62	191	105	133	234	454	3,103	1.54%	0	0	0
Other parties		82	149	48	315	56	44	48	123	17	107	28	43	58	456	1,574	0.78%	0	0	0
Valid votes		17,513	23,313	10,083	33,947	6,965	7,395	9,616	20,004	6,441	12,167	6,378	7,582	9,081	31,259	201,744	100.00%	11	2	13
Rejected votes		264	339	142	533	106	107	137	321	110	198	93	167	157	474	3,148	1.54%			
Total polled		17,777	23,652	10,225	34,480	7,071	7,502	9,753	20,325	6,551	12,365	6,471	7,749	9,238	31,733	204,892	87.78%			
Registered electors		19,866	26,281	11,489	39,138	8,261	8,429	11,160	23,020	7,553	14,163	7,725	9,262	10,585	36,494	233,426				
Turnout		89.48%	90.00%	89.00%	88.10%	85.59%	89.00%	87.39%	88.29%	86.73%	87.30%	83.77%	83.66%	87.27%	86.95%	87.78%				

The following candidates were elected: Elving Andersson (C); Lars Bäckström (V); Mona Berglund Nilsson (S); Lisbet Calner (S); Åke Carnerö (KDS); Stig Grauers (M); Märta Johansson (S); Per Lager (MP); Lennart Nilsson (S); Kent Olsson (M); Sverre Palm (S); Inger René (M); and Kenth Skårvik (FP).

===== 1991 =====
Results of the 1991 general election held on 15 September 1991:

Party		Votes per municipality														Total votes	%	Seats		
Party		Härryda	Kun- gälv	Lysekil	Möln- dal	Munke- dal	Öckerö	Orust	Partille	Sote- näs	Stenung- sund	Ström- stad	Tanum	Tjörn	Udde- valla	Total votes	%	Con.	Lev.	Tot.
Swedish Social Democratic Party	S	5,009	7,425	4,742	11,084	2,410	1,814	2,709	5,845	2,438	3,602	2,228	1,791	2,081	12,528	65,706	33.55%	4	0	4
Moderate Party	M	4,251	5,213	1,565	8,056	1,101	1,711	1,814	5,031	1,266	2,849	1,254	1,632	2,023	5,429	43,195	22.05%	3	0	3
Liberal People's Party	FP	2,263	2,336	1,035	4,626	457	814	1,029	2,735	824	1,322	623	776	1,231	2,591	22,662	11.57%	1	0	1
Christian Democratic Unity	KDS	1,217	1,809	552	2,509	631	1,648	732	1,679	495	897	386	548	1,533	2,445	17,081	8.72%	1	0	1
Centre Party	C	1,071	2,136	572	1,749	1,256	239	1,266	825	501	1,015	874	1,512	560	2,645	16,221	8.28%	1	0	1
New Democracy	NyD	1,372	1,662	675	2,339	674	513	821	1,686	431	1,059	428	735	886	2,233	15,514	7.92%	1	0	1
Left Party	V	670	915	402	1,634	220	161	335	912	192	358	207	174	182	1,379	7,741	3.95%	0	1	1
Green Party	MP	709	791	310	1,210	176	279	309	696	193	401	255	301	254	1,024	6,908	3.53%	0	0	0
Other parties		44	143	28	241	5	14	12	85	11	47	8	24	29	137	828	0.42%	0	0	0
Valid votes		16,606	22,430	9,881	33,448	6,930	7,193	9,027	19,494	6,351	11,550	6,263	7,493	8,779	30,411	195,856	100.00%	11	1	12
Rejected votes		315	415	186	652	84	116	153	331	110	236	73	129	130	581	3,511	1.76%			
Total polled		16,921	22,845	10,067	34,100	7,014	7,309	9,180	19,825	6,461	11,786	6,336	7,622	8,909	30,992	199,367	87.64%			
Registered electors		18,895	25,319	11,463	38,479	8,323	8,134	10,592	22,301	7,487	13,503	7,660	9,090	10,154	36,094	227,494				
Turnout		89.55%	90.23%	87.82%	88.62%	84.27%	89.86%	86.67%	88.90%	86.30%	87.28%	82.72%	83.85%	87.74%	85.86%	87.64%				

The following candidates were elected: Elving Andersson (C); Lars Bäckström (V); Leif Bergdahl (NyD); Lisbet Calner (S); Åke Carnerö (KDS); Stig Grauers (M); Lennart Nilsson (S); Kent Olsson (M); Sverre Palm (S); Inger René (M); Kenth Skårvik (FP); and Karl-Erik Svartberg (S).

==== 1980s ====
===== 1988 =====
Results of the 1988 general election held on 18 September 1988:

Party		Votes per municipality														Total votes	%	Seats		
Party		Härryda	Kun- gälv	Lysekil	Möln- dal	Munke- dal	Öckerö	Orust	Partille	Sote- näs	Stenung- sund	Ström- stad	Tanum	Tjörn	Udde- valla	Total votes	%	Con.	Lev.	Tot.
Swedish Social Democratic Party	S	5,487	8,083	5,089	12,660	2,686	1,994	2,974	6,784	2,713	4,169	2,571	1,999	2,217	14,318	73,744	39.23%	5	0	5
Moderate Party	M	3,107	3,852	1,274	5,782	902	1,586	1,353	3,889	963	1,984	857	1,311	1,631	4,333	32,824	17.46%	2	0	2
Liberal People's Party	FP	2,988	3,220	1,431	6,080	733	1,124	1,288	3,791	1,023	1,805	812	1,150	1,886	3,733	31,064	16.53%	2	0	2
Centre Party	C	1,585	2,704	698	2,457	1,595	341	1,550	1,144	641	1,416	1,025	1,817	818	3,416	21,207	11.28%	1	0	1
Green Party	MP	1,180	1,388	544	2,061	356	486	564	1,345	342	682	421	545	558	1,799	12,271	6.53%	1	0	1
Left Party – Communists	VPK	881	971	443	2,252	213	214	299	1,320	234	449	194	156	228	1,466	9,320	4.96%	0	1	1
Christian Democratic Unity	KDS	357	644	232	926	239	910	197	628	206	296	149	135	746	939	6,604	3.51%	0	0	0
Other parties		63	96	26	249	21	2	37	89	8	32	11	25	5	273	937	0.50%	0	0	0
Valid votes		15,648	20,958	9,737	32,467	6,745	6,657	8,262	18,990	6,130	10,833	6,040	7,138	8,089	30,277	187,971	100.00%	11	1	12
Rejected votes		162	272	150	432	75	72	107	209	62	163	71	112	70	408	2,365	1.24%			
Total polled		15,810	21,230	9,887	32,899	6,820	6,729	8,369	19,199	6,192	10,996	6,111	7,250	8,159	30,685	190,336	86.32%			
Registered electors		18,051	24,007	11,379	37,709	8,110	7,664	9,854	21,965	7,234	12,792	7,444	8,810	9,613	35,868	220,500				
Turnout		87.59%	88.43%	86.89%	87.24%	84.09%	87.80%	84.93%	87.41%	85.60%	85.96%	82.09%	82.29%	84.87%	85.55%	86.32%				

The following candidates were elected: Elving Andersson (C); Lars Bäckström (VPK); Lisbet Calner (S); Jens Eriksson (M); Kent Lundgren (MP); Lennart Nilsson (S); Ing-Britt Nygren (M); Leif Olsson (FP); Sverre Palm (S); Kenth Skårvik (FP); Karl-Erik Svartberg (S); and Evert Svensson (S).

===== 1985 =====
Results of the 1985 general election held on 15 September 1985:

Party		Votes per municipality														Total votes	%	Seats		
Party		Härryda	Kun- gälv	Lysekil	Möln- dal	Munke- dal	Öckerö	Orust	Partille	Sote- näs	Stenung- sund	Ström- stad	Tanum	Tjörn	Udde- valla	Total votes	%	Con.	Lev.	Tot.
Swedish Social Democratic Party	S	5,726	8,313	5,437	13,634	2,817	2,035	2,965	7,107	2,921	4,166	2,694	2,112	2,173	14,975	77,075	40.33%	5	0	5
Moderate Party	M	3,536	4,577	1,658	6,673	1,202	1,756	1,729	4,619	1,230	2,399	1,084	1,627	2,178	5,515	39,783	20.82%	2	1	3
Liberal People's Party	FP	3,558	4,035	1,589	7,147	903	1,501	1,600	4,541	1,181	2,010	1,045	1,438	2,131	4,789	37,468	19.60%	2	0	2
Centre Party	C	1,520	2,834	894	2,682	1,769	1,054	1,659	1,261	760	1,441	1,126	2,075	1,280	3,964	24,319	12.72%	2	0	2
Left Party – Communists	VPK	793	883	422	2,069	197	166	286	1,192	211	412	152	144	186	1,440	8,553	4.48%	0	0	0
Green Party	MP	259	435	124	517	157	85	152	293	84	166	149	193	145	570	3,329	1.74%	0	0	0
Other parties		22	23	22	162	12	18	12	149	6	14	9	7	13	130	599	0.31%	0	0	0
Valid votes		15,414	21,100	10,146	32,884	7,057	6,615	8,403	19,162	6,393	10,608	6,259	7,596	8,106	31,383	191,126	100.00%	11	1	12
Rejected votes		108	141	85	286	49	44	66	133	52	91	28	73	52	281	1,489	0.77%			
Total polled		15,522	21,241	10,231	33,170	7,106	6,659	8,469	19,295	6,445	10,699	6,287	7,669	8,158	31,664	192,615	90.03%			
Registered electors		17,025	23,063	11,304	36,452	8,028	7,371	9,582	21,112	7,211	12,023	7,334	8,804	9,139	35,497	213,945				
Turnout		91.17%	92.10%	90.51%	91.00%	88.52%	90.34%	88.38%	91.39%	89.38%	88.99%	85.72%	87.11%	89.27%	89.20%	90.03%				

The following candidates were elected: Elving Andersson (C); Lisbet Calner (S); Nils Carlshamre (M); Jens Eriksson (M); Siri Häggmark (M); Kjell A. Mattsson (C); Lennart Nilsson (S); Leif Olsson (FP); Sverre Palm (S); Kenth Skårvik (FP); Karl-Erik Svartberg (S); and Evert Svensson (S).

Permanent substitutions:

- Kjell A. Mattsson (C) resigned on 31 October 1987 and was replaced by Eva Rydén (C) on 1 November 1987.

===== 1982 =====
Results of the 1982 general election held on 19 September 1982:

Party		Votes per municipality														Total votes	%	Seats		
Party		Härryda	Kun- gälv	Lysekil	Möln- dal	Munke- dal	Öckerö	Orust	Partille	Sote- näs	Stenung- sund	Ström- stad	Tanum	Tjörn	Udde- valla	Total votes	%	Con.	Lev.	Tot.
Swedish Social Democratic Party	S	5,470	7,766	5,523	13,104	2,841	1,780	2,791	6,866	2,956	4,031	2,799	2,151	2,033	15,402	75,513	40.45%	4	1	5
Moderate Party	M	4,241	5,270	1,923	8,386	1,315	2,183	1,990	5,615	1,428	2,812	1,257	1,767	2,565	6,445	47,197	25.28%	3	0	3
Centre Party	C	2,150	3,440	1,140	3,542	2,158	728	2,111	1,727	963	1,828	1,422	2,689	1,212	5,448	30,558	16.37%	2	0	2
Liberal People's Party	FP	1,467	1,750	883	2,962	436	850	770	2,063	719	832	517	760	1,276	2,109	17,394	9.32%	1	0	1
Left Party – Communists	VPK	807	867	396	2,314	176	169	257	1,253	210	404	144	154	161	1,322	8,634	4.63%	0	0	0
Christian Democratic Unity	KDS	182	366	164	607	113	501	122	285	111	123	113	97	398	471	3,653	1.96%	0	0	0
Green Party	MP	334	372	139	658	123	132	115	295	87	181	119	105	129	474	3,263	1.75%	0	0	0
K-Party	K-P	26	8	4	64	5	12	4	7	6	11	0	4	4	110	265	0.14%	0	0	0
Other parties		25	26	6	47	0	4	5	23	5	4	4	3	5	29	186	0.10%	0	0	0
Valid votes		14,702	19,865	10,178	31,684	7,167	6,359	8,165	18,134	6,485	10,226	6,375	7,730	7,783	31,810	186,663	100.00%	10	1	11
Rejected votes		104	183	87	289	53	47	56	132	44	100	21	48	40	249	1,453	0.77%			
Total polled		14,806	20,048	10,265	31,973	7,220	6,406	8,221	18,266	6,529	10,326	6,396	7,778	7,823	32,059	188,116	91.43%			
Registered electors		15,928	21,591	11,224	34,678	7,992	7,036	9,178	19,730	7,210	11,328	7,266	8,820	8,687	35,074	205,742				
Turnout		92.96%	92.85%	91.46%	92.20%	90.34%	91.05%	89.57%	92.58%	90.55%	91.15%	88.03%	88.19%	90.05%	91.40%	91.43%				

The following candidates were elected: Elving Andersson (C); Lisbet Calner (S); Nils Carlshamre (M); Jens Eriksson (M); Siri Häggmark (M); Tyra Johansson (S); Kjell A. Mattsson (C); Lennart Nilsson (S); Kenth Skårvik (FP); Karl-Erik Svartberg (S); and Evert Svensson (S).

==== 1970s ====
===== 1979 =====
Results of the 1979 general election held on 16 September 1979:

Party		Votes per municipality														Total votes	%	Seats		
Party		Härryda	Kun- gälv	Lysekil	Möln- dal	Munke- dal	Öckerö	Orust	Partille	Sote- näs	Stenung- sund	Ström- stad	Tanum	Tjörn	Udde- valla	Total votes	%	Con.	Lev.	Tot.
Swedish Social Democratic Party	S	4,567	6,735	5,325	11,810	2,637	1,480	2,437	6,047	2,844	3,334	2,608	1,957	1,632	14,047	67,460	37.67%	4	0	4
Moderate Party	M	3,244	4,249	1,658	6,725	1,082	1,818	1,477	4,661	1,201	2,174	996	1,482	2,032	5,361	38,160	21.31%	2	1	3
Centre Party	C	2,423	4,002	1,400	4,054	2,438	937	2,481	2,011	1,141	2,052	1,606	2,960	1,542	6,348	35,395	19.76%	2	0	2
Liberal People's Party	FP	2,371	2,692	1,349	4,991	632	1,359	1,136	3,111	1,021	1,384	786	1,020	1,695	3,649	27,196	15.19%	2	0	2
Left Party – Communists	VPK	751	753	340	2,114	168	152	183	1,124	143	327	144	135	158	1,273	7,765	4.34%	0	0	0
Christian Democratic Unity	KDS	104	219	52	366	69	366	35	159	85	55	88	45	254	240	2,137	1.19%	0	0	0
Workers' Party – The Communists	APK	59	30	7	94	15	5	34	20	21	26	2	12	4	172	501	0.28%	0	0	0
Communist Party of Sweden	SKP	4	1	7	11	0	3	1	5	0	1	3	0	2	23	61	0.03%	0	0	0
Other parties		18	22	14	104	7	51	6	40	18	39	22	12	13	44	410	0.23%	0	0	0
Valid votes		13,541	18,703	10,152	30,269	7,048	6,171	7,790	17,178	6,474	9,392	6,255	7,623	7,332	31,157	179,085	100.00%	10	1	11
Rejected votes		72	113	80	232	34	23	31	108	23	62	15	33	35	159	1,020	0.57%			
Total polled		13,613	18,816	10,232	30,501	7,082	6,194	7,821	17,286	6,497	9,454	6,270	7,656	7,367	31,316	180,105	90.68%			
Registered electors		14,795	20,435	11,194	33,521	7,801	6,865	8,756	18,769	7,174	10,521	7,161	8,707	8,263	34,647	198,609				
Turnout		92.01%	92.08%	91.41%	90.99%	90.78%	90.23%	89.32%	92.10%	90.56%	89.86%	87.56%	87.93%	89.16%	90.39%	90.68%				

The following candidates were elected: Georg Åberg (FP); Nils Carlshamre (M); Jens Eriksson (M); Märta Fredrikson (C); Siri Häggmark (M); Tyra Johansson (S); Torkel Lindahl (FP); Kjell A. Mattsson (C); Lennart Nilsson (S); Karl-Erik Svartberg (S); and Evert Svensson (S).

Permanent substitutions:

- Georg Åberg (FP) resigned on 15 February 1981 and was replaced by Kerstin Sandborg (FP) on 16 February 1981.

===== 1976 =====
Results of the 1976 general election held on 19 September 1976:

Party		Votes per municipality														Total votes	%	Seats		
Party		Härryda	Kun- gälv	Lysekil	Möln- dal	Munke- dal	Öckerö	Orust	Partille	Sote- näs	Stenung- sund	Ström- stad	Tanum	Tjörn	Udde- valla	Total votes	%	Con.	Lev.	Tot.
Swedish Social Democratic Party	S	4,315	6,447	5,336	11,740	2,567	1,445	2,085	6,109	2,911	3,143	2,652	1,870	1,471	13,718	65,809	37.59%	4	0	4
Centre Party	C	3,265	5,094	1,806	6,233	2,581	1,191	2,718	3,260	1,358	2,588	1,848	3,110	1,862	8,239	45,153	25.79%	2	1	3
People's Party	F	2,298	2,614	1,441	5,324	697	1,405	1,080	3,380	1,081	1,446	832	1,142	1,864	3,850	28,454	16.25%	2	0	2
Moderate Party	M	2,104	2,987	1,308	4,570	911	1,394	1,003	3,157	960	1,385	811	1,288	1,323	3,950	27,151	15.51%	2	0	2
Left Party – Communists	VPK	546	614	313	1,837	147	104	117	981	133	267	117	100	99	1,098	6,473	3.70%	0	0	0
Christian Democratic Unity	KDS	74	168	49	304	78	361	12	177	77	33	90	34	240	167	1,864	1.06%	0	0	0
Communist Party of Sweden	SKP	10	3	4	22	0	1	2	7	1	2	3	2	2	35	94	0.05%	0	0	0
Other parties		12	0	2	23	1	2	2	7	1	1	0	0	0	20	71	0.04%	0	0	0
Valid votes		12,624	17,927	10,259	30,053	6,982	5,903	7,019	17,078	6,522	8,865	6,353	7,546	6,861	31,077	175,069	100.00%	10	1	11
Rejected votes		41	77	59	143	10	15	22	69	21	38	20	9	10	118	652	0.37%			
Total polled		12,665	18,004	10,318	30,196	6,992	5,918	7,041	17,147	6,543	8,903	6,373	7,555	6,871	31,195	175,721	91.68%			
Registered electors		13,566	19,366	11,178	32,686	7,625	6,467	7,921	18,411	7,177	9,679	7,182	8,480	7,658	34,271	191,667				
Turnout		93.36%	92.97%	92.31%	92.38%	91.70%	91.51%	88.89%	93.13%	91.17%	91.98%	88.74%	89.09%	89.72%	91.02%	91.68%				

The following candidates were elected: Georg Åberg (F); Nils Carlshamre (M); Märta Fredrikson (C); Gunnar Johansson (M); Rune Johnsson (C); Tyra Johansson (S); Torkel Lindahl (F); Kjell A. Mattsson (C); Lennart Nilsson (S); Karl-Erik Svartberg (S); and Evert Svensson (S).

===== 1973 =====
Results of the 1973 general election held on 16 September 1973:

Party		Votes per municipality														Total votes	%	Seats		
Party		Härryda	Kun- gälv	Lysekil	Möln- dal	Munke- dal	Öckerö	Orust	Partille	Sote- näs	Stenung- sund	Ström- stad	Tanum	Tjörn	Udde- valla	Total votes	%	Con.	Lev.	Tot.
Swedish Social Democratic Party	S	3,819	5,916	4,875	10,836	2,442	1,160	1,715	5,702	2,947	2,662	2,655	1,902	1,243	13,265	61,139	37.84%	4	0	4
Centre Party	C	2,990	4,659	1,403	5,776	2,267	1,089	2,186	3,073	1,215	2,409	1,781	2,876	1,495	7,269	40,488	25.06%	2	1	3
People's Party	F	1,846	2,195	1,369	4,795	651	1,427	1,094	3,122	1,287	1,096	833	1,091	1,887	3,421	26,114	16.16%	2	0	2
Moderate Party	M	1,845	2,758	1,204	4,011	954	1,110	975	2,749	719	1,120	669	1,204	1,035	4,147	24,500	15.16%	2	0	2
Left Party – Communists	VPK	581	569	291	1,914	129	92	90	1,075	127	299	100	65	85	1,171	6,588	4.08%	0	0	0
Christian Democratic Unity	KDS	82	209	67	332	60	487	28	246	69	19	94	39	286	191	2,209	1.37%	0	0	0
Communist League Marxist–Leninists (the revolutionaries)	KFML(r)	34	41	42	143	5	5	6	61	5	26	7	4	2	56	437	0.27%	0	0	0
Communist Party of Sweden	SKP	11	11	2	28	0	2	0	13	1	7	1	2	1	5	84	0.05%	0	0	0
Other parties		3	0	0	7	0	7	3	2	0	0	0	0	0	2	24	0.01%	0	0	0
Valid votes		11,211	16,358	9,253	27,842	6,508	5,379	6,097	16,043	6,370	7,638	6,140	7,183	6,034	29,527	161,583	100.00%	10	1	11
Rejected votes		12	18	5	47	2	4	10	14	4	14	4	6	6	39	185	0.11%			
Total polled		11,223	16,376	9,258	27,889	6,510	5,383	6,107	16,057	6,374	7,652	6,144	7,189	6,040	29,566	161,768	90.53%			
Registered electors		12,162	17,730	10,165	30,704	7,210	5,956	6,997	17,304	7,064	8,514	7,038	8,190	6,864	32,799	178,697				
Turnout		92.28%	92.36%	91.08%	90.83%	90.29%	90.38%	87.28%	92.79%	90.23%	89.88%	87.30%	87.78%	88.00%	90.14%	90.53%				

The following candidates were elected: Georg Åberg (F); Nils Carlshamre (M); Märta Fredrikson (C); Gunnar Gustafsson (S); Gunnar Johansson (M); Tyra Johansson (S); Torkel Lindahl (F); Nils Magnusson (S); Kjell A. Mattsson (C); Lennart Mattsson (C); and Evert Svensson (S).

Permanent substitutions:

- Gunnar Gustafsson (S) resigned on 14 October 1975 and was replaced by Karl-Erik Svartberg (S) on 15 October 1975.

===== 1970 =====
Results of the 1970 general election held on 20 September 1970:

Party		Votes per municipality																					Total votes	%	Seats		
Party		Askim	Härryda	Kun- gälv	Lysekil	Möln- dal	Munke- dal	Öckerö	Orust	Partille	Smögen	Södra Sotenäs	Stenung- sund	Ström- stad	Styrsö	Svarte- borg	Sörbyg- den	Tanum	Tjörn	Tos- sene	Udde- valla	Postal votes	Total votes	%	Con.	Lev.	Tot.
Swedish Social Democratic Party	S	954	2,712	4,816	4,477	8,947	1,599	963	1,471	4,512	205	1,393	1,983	2,533	200	409	156	1,761	922	1,078	11,729	5,147	57,967	37.24%	4	0	4
People's Party	F	2,084	1,985	2,859	1,444	6,167	267	1,611	1,233	4,162	478	661	1,239	983	797	332	162	1,321	2,165	267	4,686	6,166	41,069	26.38%	3	0	3
Centre Party	C	554	1,443	2,941	977	3,035	642	761	1,606	1,471	102	464	1,566	1,369	184	603	600	2,451	946	242	4,806	2,531	29,294	18.82%	2	0	2
Moderate Party	M	1,102	886	1,756	726	1,930	198	844	674	1,255	115	135	652	445	205	213	293	883	660	120	2,430	3,442	18,964	12.18%	1	0	1
Left Party – Communists	VPK	121	402	394	241	1,612	54	57	59	967	20	86	206	77	25	29	10	42	54	37	956	531	5,980	3.84%	0	0	0
Christian Democratic Unity	KDS	56	55	162	52	203	26	365	20	159	14	19	22	65	111	14	9	31	200	12	165	243	2,003	1.29%	0	0	0
Communist League Marxists-Leninists	KFML	8	21	24	13	136	2	2	0	21	0	1	14	8	0	0	0	4	0	1	13	92	360	0.23%	0	0	0
Other parties		0	0	1	0	0	0	0	0	0	0	0	0	0	0	0	0	0	0	0	1	14	16	0.01%	0	0	0
Valid votes		4,879	7,504	12,953	7,930	22,030	2,788	4,603	5,063	12,547	934	2,759	5,682	5,480	1,522	1,600	1,230	6,493	4,947	1,757	24,786	18,166	155,653	100.00%	10	0	10
Rejected votes		4	7	9	12	18	18	2	3	13	0	2	4	2	0	3	1	7	1	1	20	67	194	0.12%			
Total polled		4,883	7,511	12,962	7,942	22,048	2,806	4,605	5,066	12,560	934	2,761	5,686	5,482	1,522	1,603	1,231	6,500	4,948	1,758	24,806	18,233	155,847				
Postal Votes		940	868	1,488	1,004	3,453	417	257	401	2,028	97	350	769	690	130	145	56	560	387	355	3,802	-18,233	-36				
Total polled		5,823	8,379	14,450	8,946	25,501	3,223	4,862	5,467	14,588	1,031	3,111	6,455	6,172	1,652	1,748	1,287	7,060	5,335	2,113	28,608	0	155,811	88.01%			
Registered electors		6,307	9,238	16,009	10,021	28,755	3,613	5,650	6,659	16,056	1,187	3,588	7,437	7,277	1,898	2,017	1,478	8,271	6,407	2,401	32,767		177,036				
Turnout		92.33%	90.70%	90.26%	89.27%	88.68%	89.21%	86.05%	82.10%	90.86%	86.86%	86.71%	86.80%	84.82%	87.04%	86.66%	87.08%	85.36%	83.27%	88.00%	87.31%		88.01%				

The following candidates were elected: Georg Åberg (F); Arvid Annerås (F); Henry Berndtsson (F); Nils Carlshamre (M); Gunnar Gustafsson (S); Nils Magnusson (S); Kjell A. Mattsson (C); Lennart Mattsson (C); Sven-Göran Olhede (S); and Evert Svensson (S).

Permanent substitutions:

- Sven-Göran Olhede (S) resigned in January 1972 and was replaced by Tyra Johansson (S).
