= Märta Johansson =

Märta Johansson may refer to:

- Märta Johansson (diver)
- Märta Johansson (politician)
