= Johanna Rantsi =

Swedish politician (born 1990)

Member of the Riksdag
- Incumbent
- Assumed office 26 September 2022
- Constituency: Västra Götaland County West
- In office 18 February 2019 – 11 April 2019
- Preceded by: Ellen Juntti
- Succeeded by: Ellen Juntti
- Constituency: Västra Götaland County West

Personal details
- Born: 21 May 1990 (age 36)
- Party: Moderate Party

Johanna Christina Rantsi (born 21 May 1990) is a Swedish politician. She has been a member of the Riksdag since 2022, having previously served from February to April 2019. Until 2022, she was a municipal councillor of Mölndal.
