= Wetterling =

Wetterling is a surname. Notable people with the surname include:

- Jacob Wetterling (1978–1989), American murder victim
  - Wetterling Act, a United States law named for Jacob
- Jessica Wetterling (born 1986), Swedish politician
- Patty Wetterling (born 1949), American activist and politician
