= Vedin =

Vedin is a surname and a given name. Notable people with the name include:

- Anna Vedin (born 1966), Swedish politician
- Vedin Musić, Bosnian footballer

== See also ==
- Veden
