= Petra Ekerum =

Swedish politician (born 1980)

Member of the Riksdag
- In office 10 January 2017 – 24 September 2018
- Preceded by: Jan-Olof Larsson
- Constituency: Västra Götaland County West

Personal details
- Born: 1980 (age 45–46)
- Party: Social Democratic Party

Petra Margareta Ekerum (born 1980) is a Swedish politician and former member of the Riksdag, the national legislature. A member of the Social Democratic Party, she represented Västra Götaland County West between January 2017 and September 2018.
