= Kent Olsson =

Kent Olsson may refer to:

- Kent Olsson (politician) (born 1944), Swedish politician of the Moderate Party
- Kent Olsson (orienteer) (born 1958), Swedish orienteering competitor
