= Hamza Demir =

Swedish politician (born 1956)

Member of the Riksdag
- In office 1 November 2017 – 24 September 2018
- Preceded by: Wiwi-Anne Johansson
- Constituency: Västra Götaland County West

Personal details
- Born: 1956 (age 69–70)
- Party: Left Party

Hamza Demir (born 1956) is a Swedish politician and former member of the Riksdag, the national legislature. A member of the Left Party, he represented Västra Götaland County West between November 2017 and September 2018. Demir is of Turkish descent.
