= Camilla Waltersson Grönvall =

Swedish politician (born 1969)

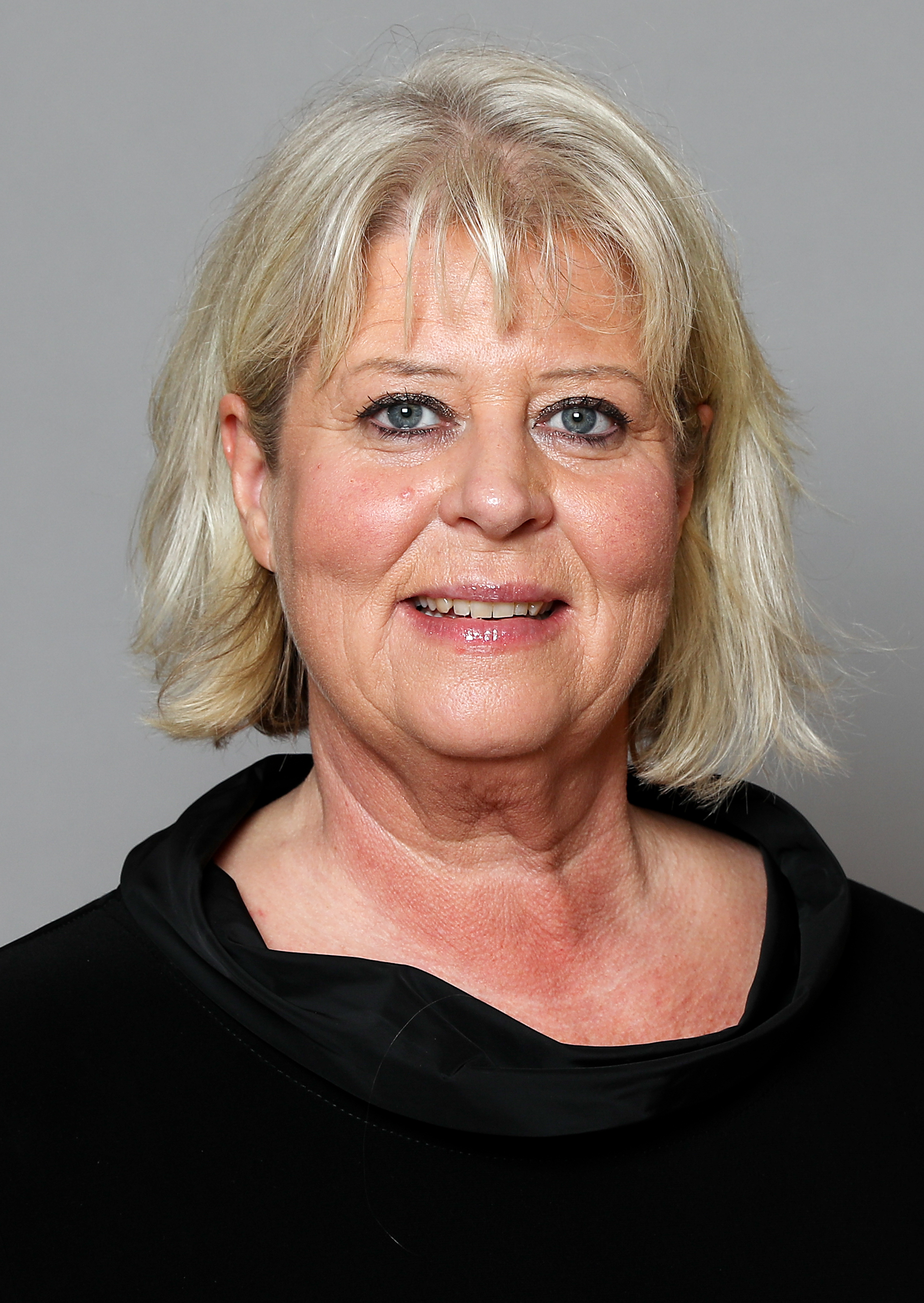
- Waltersson Grönvall in 2022.

Minister for Social Services
- Incumbent
- Assumed office 18 October 2022
- Prime Minister: Ulf Kristersson
- Preceded by: New position

Member of the Riksdag
- Incumbent
- Assumed office 4 October 2010
- Constituency: Västra Götaland County West

Personal details
- Born: 19 March 1969 (age 57) Vårgårda, Sweden
- Party: Moderate Party

Camilla Waltersson Grönvall (born 19 March 1969) is a Swedish politician who has served as Minister for Social Services in the cabinet of Prime Minister Ulf Kristersson since October 2022. A member of the Moderate Party, she has been a member of the Riksdag since 2010.

She is the elder sister of Mikaela Waltersson, the President of the Executive Committee of the Halland Regional Council since 2018. She is married and has three children.

Political offices
Preceded by New position	Minister for Social Services; 2022–present	Incumbent
