= Elin Andersson =

Swedish politician (born 1981)

Member of the Riksdag
- Incumbent
- Assumed office 28 September 2026
- Constituency: Västra Götaland County West

Personal details
- Born: 1981 (age 44–45) Sweden
- Party: Liberals

Elin Andersson (born 1981) is a Swedish politician from the Liberals. She has been a member of the Riksdag since 2026, elected for the Västra Götaland County West constituency.

== Biography ==
Andersson has a degree in engineering and has worked as an IT specialist. She lives in Mölndal and has three children.

=== Political career ===
Andersson has been a municipal councillor for the Liberal Party in the Mölndal Municipality. She has been a member of the municipal council, the municipal board and the municipal board's working committee, as well as vice-chair of the crisis management committee and of the municipal company Kvarnfallet AB.

At the 2026 Swedish general election, Andersson was the Liberal Party's top candidate in the Västra Götaland County West constituency. She was also in seventh place on the Liberal Party's nationwide parliamentary list.

Andersson was elected as a member of the Riksdag and took office on 28 September 2026 as a member of the Västra Götaland County Western Constituency.

== See also ==
- List of members of the Riksdag, 2026–2030
