= Joakim Järrebring =

Swedish politician (born 1976)

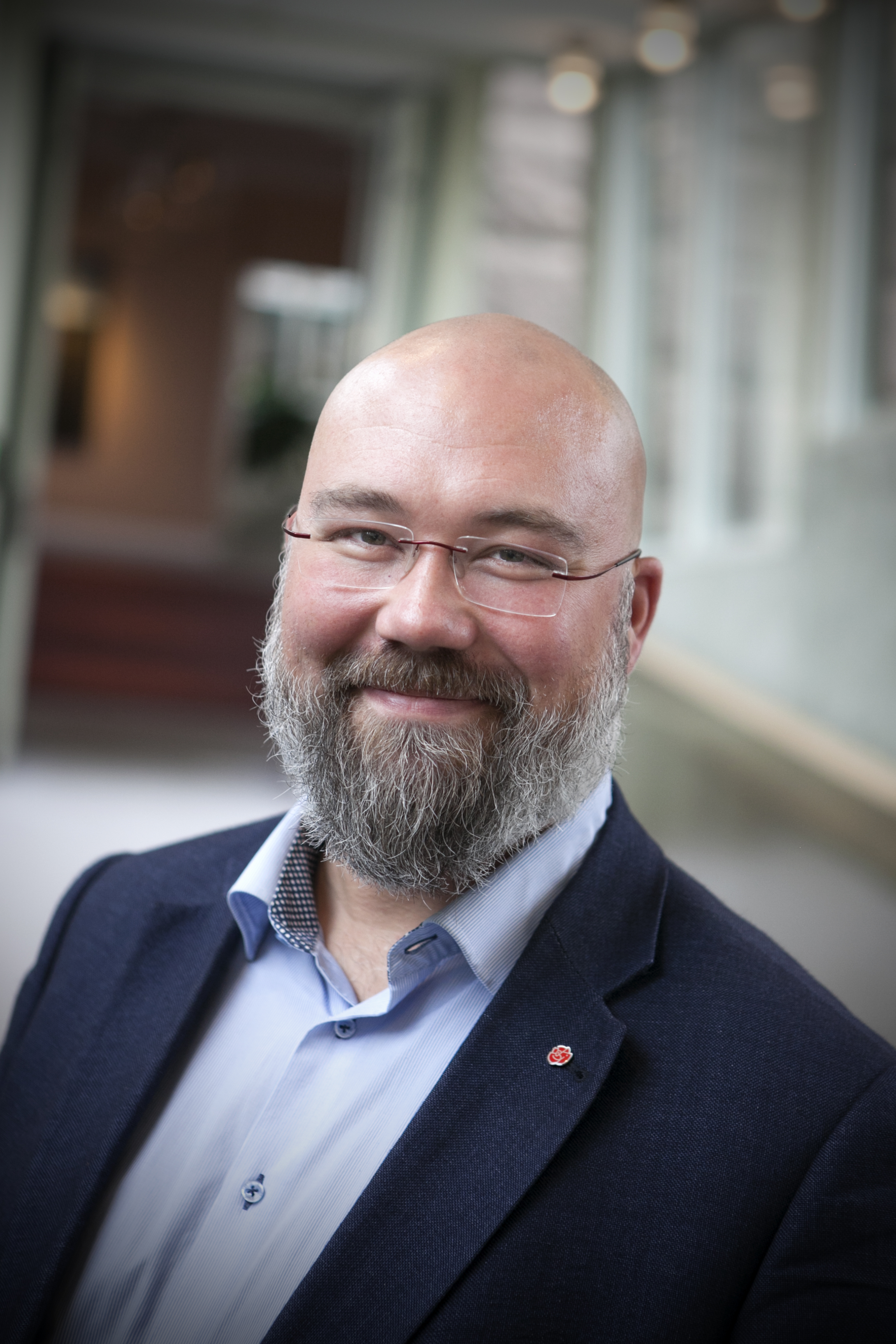

Member of the Riksdag
- Incumbent
- Assumed office 24 September 2018
- Constituency: Västra Götaland County West

Personal details
- Born: 1976 (age 49–50)
- Party: Social Democrats

Joakim Järrebring (born 1976) is a Swedish politician. Since 24 September 2018, he serves as Member of the Riksdag representing the constituency of Västra Götaland County West.

He was also elected as Member of the Riksdag in September 2022.
