= Evert Svensson =

Swedish politician (1925–2024)

Member of the Riksdag for Bohus County
- In office 11 January 1971 – 29 September 1991

Member of the Second Chamber
- In office 1957–1970

Personal details
- Born: Evert Ingemar Svensson; 16 June 1925 Gothenburg, Sweden
- Died: 1 September 2024 (aged 99) Kungälv, Sweden
- Party: SAP
- Education: Socialhögskola
- Occupation: Sociologist

Evert Ingemar Svensson (16 June 1925 – 1 September 2024) was a Swedish sociologist and politician. A member of the Social Democratic Party, he served in the Second Chamber from 1957 to 1970 and in the Riksdag from 1971 to 1991.

Svensson died in Kungälv on 1 September 2024, at the age of 99.
