= Rashid Farivar =

Iranian-Swedish politician (born 1982)

Rashid Farivar Member of the Riksdag
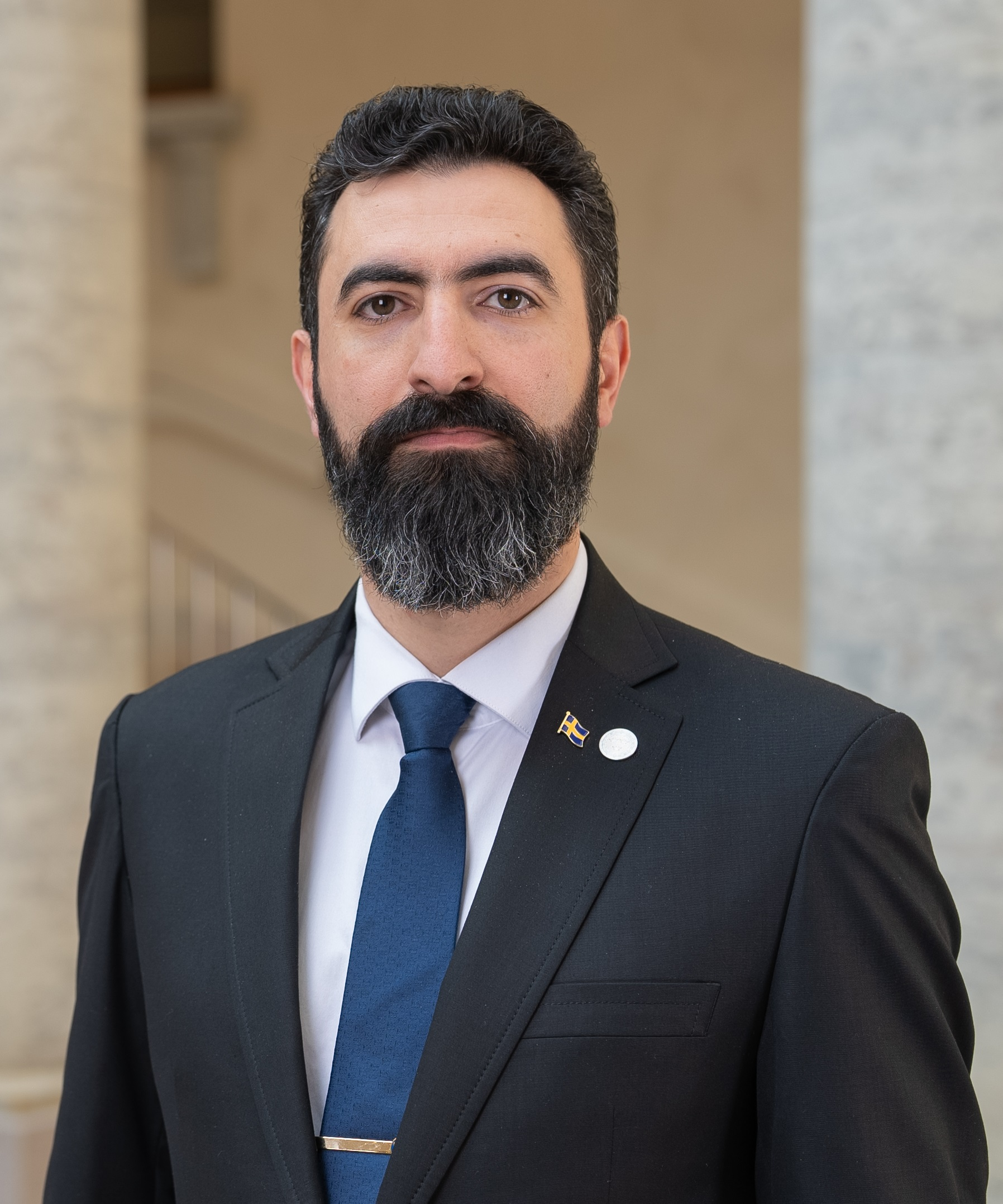
- Rashid Farivar at The Swedish Parliament

Member of the Riksdag
- Incumbent
- Assumed office 26 September 2022
- Constituency: Västra Götaland County West

Personal details
- Born: 15 May 1982 (age 44) Tabriz, Iran
- Party: Sweden Democrats
- Spouse: Ava Farivar
- Relations: Married
- Children: 3
- Education: K. N. Toosi University of Technology; Chalmers University of Technology
- Occupation: R&D Engineer

Rashid Farivar (born 15 May 1982 in Iran) is an Iranian-born Swedish engineer and politician of the Sweden Democrats party who was elected to the Riksdag in 2022 general election representing the Västra Götaland County West constituency.

== Biography ==
=== Early life and education ===
Farivar was born in Tabriz, Iran in 1982 before moving to the capital Tehran in 1999. He obtained his bachelor's degree in electrical engineering at the K. N. Toosi University of Technology in 2004 before moving to Sweden on his own in 2005 to pursue his higher education. He subsequently completed a Master of Science degree in engineering at Chalmers University of Technology before starting a PhD work at the Department of Microtechnology and Nanoscience - MC2 but left the university before completing his PhD with a licentiate degree of engineering. He then started working as a research and development engineer within the automotive industry for Semcon, Volvo Trucks and predominantly Volvo Cars.

Farivar speaks Swedish, English, Azeri (Azerbaijani language), Persian and Turkish. He has some knowledge of Arabic, as well.

== Political career ==
Farivar joined the Sweden Democrats in early 2017 and is a board member for the party in Mölndal. For the 2022 Swedish general election, Farivar was elected to the Riksdag to represent Västra Götaland County West constituency and takes up seat 339 in the parliament. In the Riksdag he sits on the committees for Transport and Communications, Civil Affairs and Environment and Agriculture.

=== Political views ===
In politics, Farivar has called for more strict policies to integrate immigrants into Swedish society, including compulsory language and assimilationist tests, and for tougher stances against Islamism. He also opposes multiculturalism, arguing that it has been responsible for creating parallel societies or cultural exclusion within Sweden. He also accused the political left in Sweden of "pure racism" by expecting immigrants to be in favour of open door policy and more immigration and has expressed support for voluntary repatriation measures for immigrants who do not wish to integrate within the Swedish society. Farivar has also spoken out against the Islamic Nuance Party, claiming that it aims to expose culturally unassimilated immigrants in Sweden to Islamism.

Farivar also continues to comment on Iranian politics and as a student in Iran was active in libertarian and pro-freedom of speech student groups opposing the policies of the Iranian government. He has stated that much of his political beliefs were formed after hardline supporters of Mahmoud Ahmadinejad took over his university and suppressed opposition and that his family have been threatened in both Iran and Sweden for their support of dissident Iranian groups. He has criticized Swedish politicians on the left whom he argues are too friendly and soft towards the Iranian regime. He referred to Swedish Social Democratic Party foreign minister Ann Linde as "shameless" and "sick" for taking part in a 40th anniversary celebration of the Islamic Revolution in Iran. In 2022, along with SD politicians Markus Wiechel and Charlie Weimers he took part in a demonstration against the Iranian government in Stockholm.

In 2023, following the Quran burnings in Sweden, Farivar expressed opposition to proposals to change the Swedish order law so that demonstrations deemed to be a risk of disturbing the security of Sweden can be stopped and said he would vote down the proposal. He argued that the proposed change would stifle freedom of expression and give power to foreign dictatorships and Muslim extremists to demand more censorship.

== See also ==
- List of members of the Riksdag, 2022–2026
