= Dennis Alvdén =

Swedish politician (born 1997)

Member of the Riksdag
- Incumbent
- Assumed office 28 September 2026
- Constituency: Västra Götaland County West

Personal details
- Born: 2 August 1997 (age 29)
- Party: Moderate Party

Dennis Wilhelm Alvdén (born 2 August 1997) is a Swedish politician serving as a member of the Riksdag since 2026. He previously appeared as a child actor in the Johan Falk film series.
