= Carina Örgård =

Swedish politician

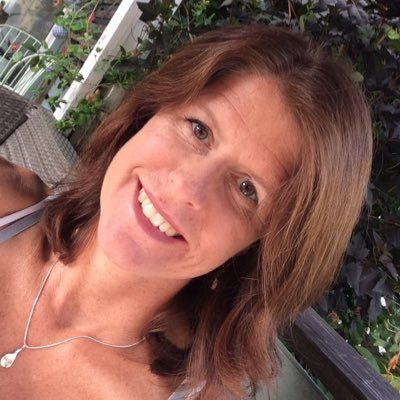

Member of the Riksdag
- Incumbent
- Assumed office 2026
- Constituency: Västra Götaland County West

Personal details
- Born: 1970 (age 55–56)
- Party: Left Party

Carina Örgård (born 1970) is a Swedish politician from the Left Party. She was elected as a member of the Riksdag in the 2026 Swedish general election.

== Biography ==
Örgård entered politics in 2012. She joined the Left Party in June 2013. She was previously a member of the regional board of the Västra Götaland region.

== See also ==
- List of members of the Riksdag, 2026–2030
