= Roland Utbult =

Swedish politician and musician

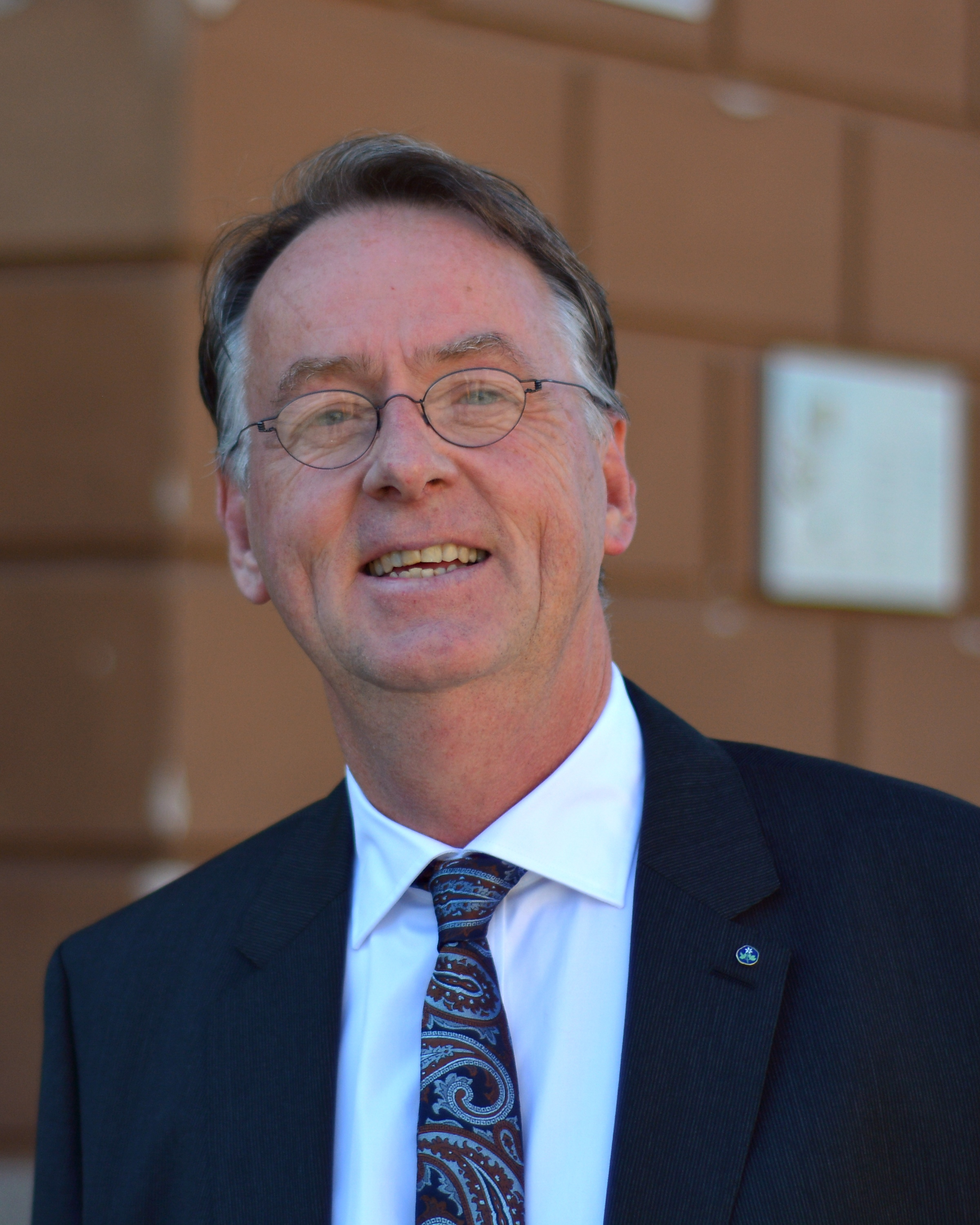

Member of the Swedish Parliament for Kristdemokraterna
- Incumbent
- Assumed office 4 October 2010

Personal details
- Born: 24 May 1951 (age 75) Öckerö, Sweden
- Other political affiliations: Folkpartiet
- Occupation: Singer

Roland Utbult (born 24 May 1951) is a Swedish politician and musician. Prior to entering politics, Utbult had a successful musical career in the Christian genre of Swedish music. He is a politician serving Kristdemokraterna in the Swedish Riksdag using his musical ability in his service as a politician before the parliament.

Along with other influential Christian musicians, Utbult appeared on the Swedish version of Gaither Homecoming "Minns du sången".

== Biography ==
=== Early years ===
Roland Utbult was born to fisherman Vilhelm Utbult and his wife Annie, née Pettersson, in Öckerö in the inner Göteborg archipelago.

He attended Göteborg University, earning a Bachelor of Arts in History. He later was enrolled at the Göteborg Academy of Music and the Göteborg Teachers Academy, leaving in 1978.

=== Career ===
Utbult started out as a teacher of Music in Uddevalla from 1971–1974. He later returned to teach History and Music 1978–1989. Utbult has collaborated with Oslo Gospel Choir, Tomas Ledin, Andraé Crouch, Per-Erik Hallin, Triple & Touch, Gladys del Pilar, Janne Schaffer, Bandmaskien, and the Swedish Radio Symphony Orchestra. Utbult has appeared in the Swedish TV series Minns du Sången. His songs Om Sommaren and Längtan till havet both spent five weeks on The Svensktoppen, a Swedish weekly record chart, in the summers of 1998 and 2003 respectively.

From 1990–2000, he earned his keep as a freelance musician, before moving into the social works sector serving as a communications officer for Göteborgs Räddningsmission 2000–2009, and Erikshjälpen 2009–2010.

=== Political Career ===
==== Social Liberal candidate ====
Roland Utbult made his debut in politics in 2005, when he joined Folkpartiet, a Swedish liberal political party with roots in the Free-minded movement and a social liberalism policy agenda. He stood for Parliament in the 2006 Swedish general election, failed to secure a seat but was elected alternate member for the 2006–2009 mandate. In the same election, he was a successful candidate to the municipal council of Uddevalla, and subsequently appointed to the municipal executive board and the social services board for the 2006–2009 mandate.

==== Conservative Member of Parliament ====
In June 2009, he ran for European Parliament, again unsuccessfully. During the campaign, he was derided by the Leftparty as "a free-church musician who has strived to become known for his anti-abortion and family fundamentalist values", his "Christian conservatism" called an anomaly within a Liberal party. In August the same year, Utbult announced his defection to Kristdemokraterna, citing a better fit for his policy on marriage and family.

Utbult ran in the 2010 Swedish general election as a conservative, and was elected for the 2010–2014 mandate on the party list for Kristdemokraterna in the Västra Götaland County Western constituency. Having placed third in the party primaries, he won the preference vote with 17 % of the party vote, surpassing both top candidates. He was reelected in 2014, 2018 and 2022. In March 2026, Roland Utbult announced that he was not seeking reelection in the 2006 Swedish general election.

== Discography ==
- 1975 Roland Utbult
- 1977 - Solkart
- 1978 - Sten Tuff - Single
- 1979 - Du är musiken
- 1982 - Kom och se
- 1982 - På din sida
- 1984 - Till vår Gud
- 1986 - Ansikte mot Gud
- 1988 - Den första kärleken
- 1991 - En sång inom mig
- 1993 - Längtan
- 1994 - Sjung sjung Halleuja
- 1995 - Stilla natt, heliga natt
- 1996 - Se dig om
- 1998 - Milstolpar
- 2003 - Längtan till havet
- 2003 - Små nycklar
- 2006 - Så skimrande var aldrig havet
- 2007 - Milstolpar 2
- 2009 - Roland Utbults bästa
- 2018 - KD-Låten
- 2020 - I Jesu armar
- 2022 - Vi är redo
