= Janine Alm Ericson =

Swedish politician (born 1973)

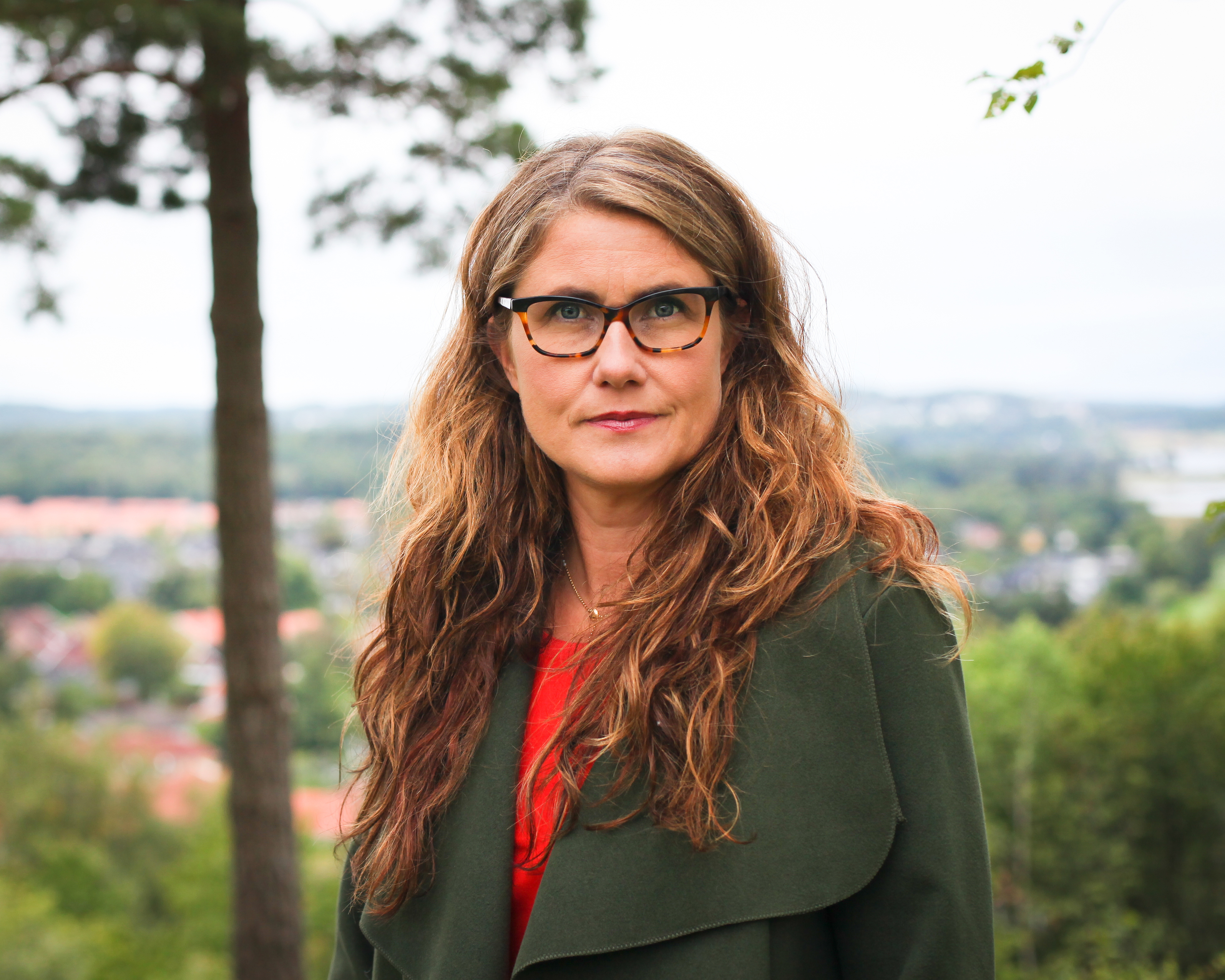
- Alm Ericson in 2017

Member of the Riksdag
- Incumbent
- Assumed office 29 September 2014
- Constituency: Västra Götaland County West

Personal details
- Born: 31 October 1973 (age 52)
- Party: Green Party

Janine Alm Ericson (born 31 October 1973) is a Swedish politician. She has served as a Member of the Riksdag since September 2014. She represented the constituency of Västra Götaland County North in her first term and, as of 2018, she represents the constituency of Västra Götaland County West. She is affiliated with the Green Party.

She was also elected as a Member of the Riksdag in September 2022.
