= Mona Berglund Nilsson =

Swedish politician (born 1942)

Member of the Riksdag
- In office 3 October 1994 – 2 October 2006
- Constituency: Västra Götaland County West

Personal details
- Born: 1942 (age 83–84)
- Party: Social Democratic Party

Mona Lisbeth Berglund Nilsson (born 1942) is a Swedish politician and former member of the Riksdag, the national legislature. A member of the Social Democratic Party, she represented Västra Götaland County West between October 1994 and October 2006. She was also a substitute member of the Riksdag for Karl-Erik Svartberg between October 1989 and November 1989.
