= Katarina Bosetti-Kristoffersson =

Swedish politician (born 1979)

Katarina Berggren

Member of the Riksdag
- Incumbent
- Assumed office 28 September 2026
- Constituency: Västra Götaland County West

Personal details
- Born: 1 March 1979 (age 47) Sweden
- Party: Swedish Social Democratic Party

Katarina Bosetti-Kristoffersson (born 1 March 1979) is a Swedish trade union ombudsman and politician from the Social Democratic Party. She has been a member of the Riksdag since 2026, elected for the constituency of Västra Götaland County West.

== Background ==
Bosetti-Kristoffersson has worked as a truck fitter in industry and then as a union ombudsman. Before the 2026 parliamentary election, she worked as an ombudsman for Swedish Trade Union Confederation (LO) and was a resident of Partille Municipality.

== Political career ==
Bosetti-Kristoffersson has been a member of the municipal council in Partille Municipality during the term of office 2022–2026. Since January 2023, she has been second vice-chair of the municipality's education committee.

=== Riksdag ===
In the 2026 Swedish general election, she was elected to the Riksdag. She is a deputy member of the Committee on Environment and Agriculture.

== See also ==
- List of members of the Riksdag, 2026–2030
