= Lennart Nilsson (politician) =

Swedish politician (1944–2025)

Member of the Riksdag
- In office 4 October 1976 – 2 October 2006
- Constituency: Västra Götaland County West

Personal details
- Born: 1944
- Died: June 2025 (aged 80–81)
- Party: Social Democratic Party

Lennart Nilsson (1944 – 10 June 2025) was a Swedish politician and former member of the Riksdag, the national legislature. A member of the Social Democratic Party, he represented Västra Götaland County West between October 1976 and October 2006. Nilsson died of an unspecified illness in June 2025.
