= Anders Ådahl =

Swedish politician

Member of the Riksdag
- Incumbent
- Assumed office 2022
- Constituency: Västra Götaland County West

Personal details
- Born: 6 March 1972 (age 54) Borås, Älvsborg County, Sweden
- Party: Centre Party
- Education: Chalmers University of Technology

Nils Gunnar Anders Ådahl (born 6 March 1972) is a Swedish politician from the Centre Party. He has been a member of the Riksdag since 2022, elected for the Västra Götaland County West constituency.

In the Riksdag, he has been the vice chairman of the Committee on Industry and Trade since December 2025. He has previously been a member of the Committee on Education and the Committee on Taxation.

Ådahl is a Doctor of Technology in Energy and Environment, educated at Chalmers University of Technology. During the 2018–2022 term, he was chairman of the Environmental Committee of Mölndal Municipality.

== See also ==
- List of members of the Riksdag, 2022–2026
