= Gunilla Gomér =

Swedish politician (born 1960)

Member of the Riksdag
- Incumbent
- Assumed office 28 September 2026
- Constituency: Västra Götaland County West

Personal details
- Born: 13 February 1960 (age 66) Gothenburg, Västra Götaland County, Sweden
- Party: Sweden Democrats (since 2014)
- Other political affiliations: Christian Democrats (until 2014)

Gunilla Margaretha Gomér (née; Kjellqvist; formerly Kjellqvist Brynildsen; born 13 February 1960) is a Swedish politician from the Sweden Democrats. She has been a member of the Riksdag since 2026, elected for the Västra Götaland County West constituency. She was previously a politician for the Christian Democrats until 2014.

== Biography ==
Gunilla Gomér was born in 1960 in Gothenburg and has been active in Alingsås Municipality as a local politician since the late 1990s. She was involved in family issues within the Christian Democrats and had municipal and regional political assignments for the party in Västra Götaland. In the 2010 Swedish general election, she was in third place on the Christian Democrats' parliamentary list in the Västra Götaland County North constituency. She received the most personal votes among the party's candidates in the constituency and was close to being elected to the Riksdag.

Gomér was also the chairman of the anti-abortion organization Ja till livet. Her involvement in the abortion issue made her a prominent figure within the Christian Democrats. Before the 2014 Swedish general election, she was removed from the party's parliamentary list.

=== Move to the Sweden Democrats ===
In November 2014, Gomér left the Christian Democrats and became a member of the Sweden Democrats. In a debate article, she explained her party switch by saying that she and the Christian Democrats had "grown apart" and that she had felt opposed as a conservative. The chairman of the Christian Democrats' nomination committee, Urban Eklund, rejected her description and stated that difficulties in cooperation had been behind her removal from the party's ballot. Eklund also argued that Gomér had moved further and further away from the party's line over time.

Gomér's stated motivation for switching was, among other things, that she wanted to work for a "responsible asylum policy" within the Sweden Democrats. She also highlighted the party's pro-Israel stance as a factor behind her choice of party.

=== Political activities in the Sweden Democrats ===
After switching parties, Gomér continued her political activities in Alingsås and later became group leader for the Sweden Democrats in the municipality. She has held positions on the municipal board and the building and environment committee, among others.

She was a member of the Västra Götaland Region Regional Council for the Christian Democrats from 2010 to 2014 and was a substitute member of the Regional Council for the Sweden Democrats in 2022.

Ahead of the 2026 Swedish general election, Gomér ran for the Sweden Democrats. She cited, among other things, elderly care, security, and the conditions of companies as important political issues.

After the election, Gomér became the Member of Parliament for Västra Götaland County West. She took office as a regular Member of Parliament on 28 September 2026 with a term of office until 23 September 2030.

In an interview after the election, Gomér stated that she would remain in Alingsås and use the Sweden Democrats' overnight accommodation in Stockholm during the parliamentary weeks. She highlighted welfare, elderly care, healthcare and business conditions as issues she wanted to work on in the Riksdag.

== Political positions ==
Ahead of the 2026 Swedish local elections, Gomér and the Sweden Democrats in Alingsås highlighted security, elderly care, schools and entrepreneurship as central issues. Gomér advocated, among other things, more security guards, security guards and increased camera surveillance. She also emphasized preventive measures, especially to protect the elderly against fraud.

In school policy, Gomér has argued for a greater focus on order and study peace and more teacher-led teaching. She has also advocated smaller teaching groups for students who have difficulty functioning in large classes and opposed what she describes as the far-reaching inclusion of students in large teaching groups.

Gomér has been particularly involved in issues of school meals and elderly care. She has advocated that the food in the municipality's schools and elderly care should consist to a greater extent of Swedish home cooking. She has also argued for language requirements for personnel in elderly care and for users to be able to request male or female staff for intimate care.

In business issues, Gomér has advocated measures to make Alingsås municipality more business-friendly, including through a so-called business pilot. She has also argued that free parking on municipal land in central Alingsås should be preserved.

On the issue of Mjörnstranden, Gomér has stated that the Sweden Democrats no longer oppose development in the area, but want it to be implemented cautiously and in stages, and that traffic issues be resolved first. The party, however, opposes the planned landfill in Upplo.

Gomér has also stated that after the 2026 Swedish general election, the Sweden Democrats want to have greater political influence in Alingsås. She has described the Moderates, the Christian Democrats and the Liberals as natural partners and said that the Sweden Democrats no longer want to be content with the role of a minor party.

== See also ==
- List of members of the Riksdag, 2026–2030
