= Ellen Juntti =

Swedish politician (born 1958)

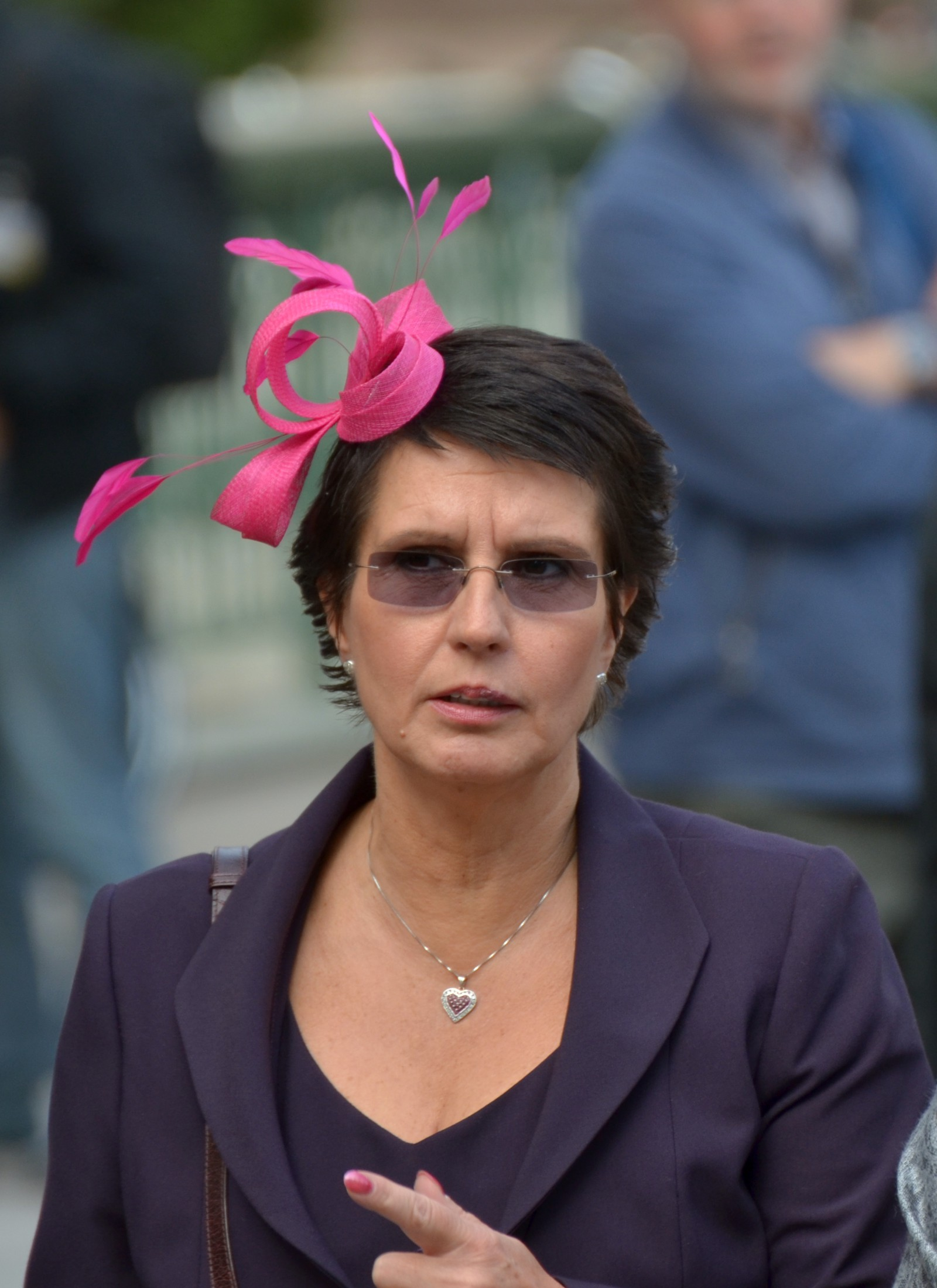

Member of the Riksdag
- Incumbent
- Assumed office 4 October 2010
- Constituency: Västra Götaland County West

Personal details
- Born: 1958 (age 67–68)
- Party: Moderate Party

Ellen Juntti (born 1958) is a Swedish politician. Since October 2010, she serves as Member of the Riksdag representing the constituency of Västra Götaland County West. She was reelected as Member of the Riksdag in September 2022.

After the 2022 election she was chosen as a member of the Committee on Civil Affairs for the Moderate Party, but was removed from the position in June 2024 due to going against the party line and voting against gender law reform in April 2024.

She speaks Meänkieli. Before entering politics she worked as a police officer.
