= Märta Johansson (politician) =

Swedish politician

Märta Johansson S

Member of the Swedish Parliament for Västra Götaland County West
- In office 1994–2002

Personal details
- Born: Märta Hillevi Johansson; 2 February 1935 Gothenburg
- Died: 7 August 2023 (aged 88) Partille, Sweden
- Party: Social Democrat
- Profession: Politician

Märta Hillevi Johansson (2 February 1935 – 7 August 2023) was a Swedish school principal and politician from the Swedish Social Democratic Party. She was a member of the Riksdag from 1994 to 2002 for the Västra Götaland County Western constituency.

Later in life she was member of the municipal council in Partille. Johansson died in August 2023 at the age of 88.

== See also ==
- List of former members of the Riksdag
