= Catharina Bråkenhielm =

Swedish politician (born 1956)

Bråkenhielm presenting herself at the Gothenburg bookfair 2012.

Catharina Bråkenhielm (born 1956) is a Swedish Social Democratic politician who was a member of the Riksdag from 2002 to 2018.
