= Inger René =

Swedish politician (born 1937)

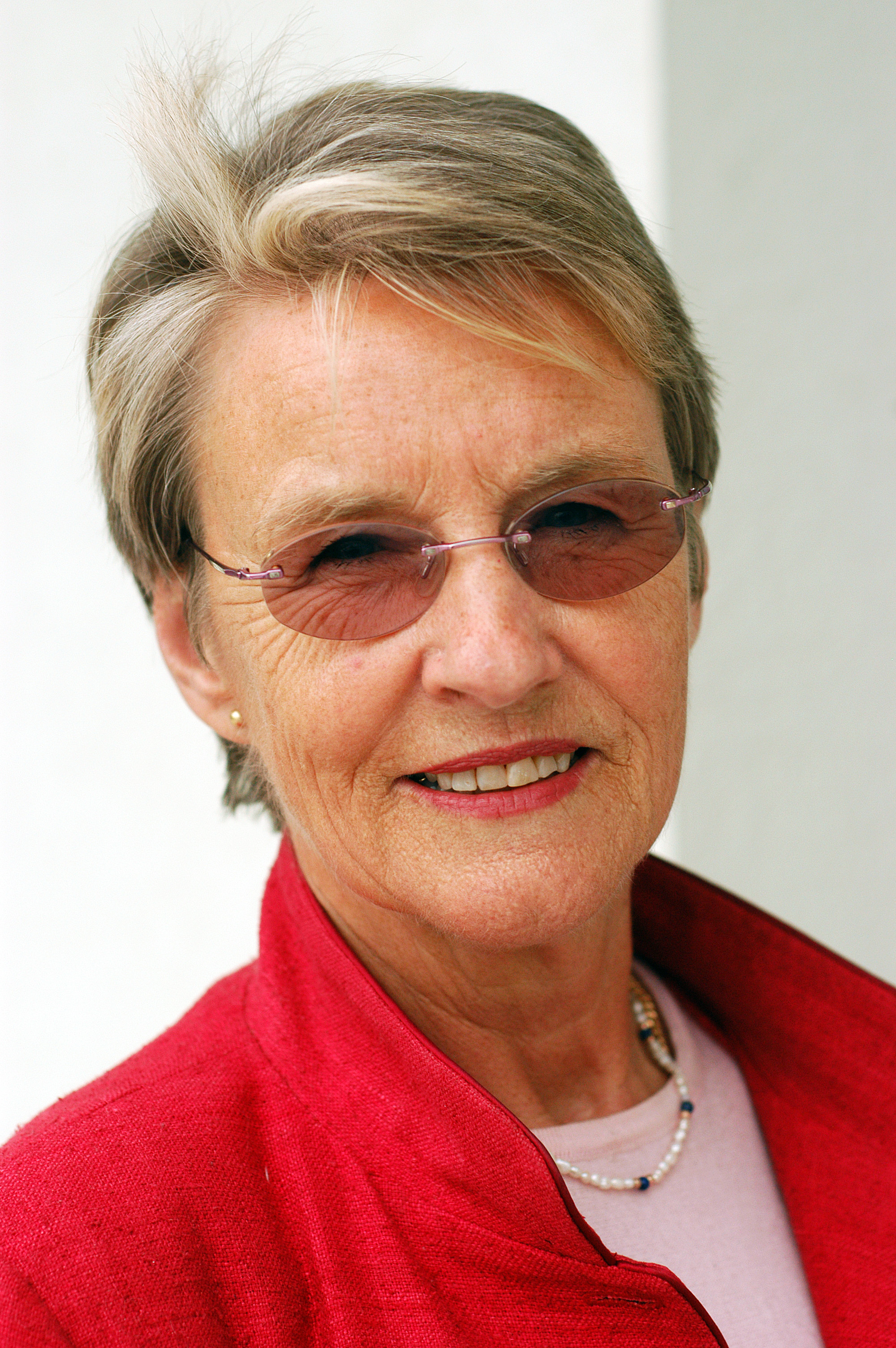

Inger René (born 1937) is a Swedish politician of the Moderate Party. She has been a member of the Riksdag since 1991.
