= Anna Vedin =

Swedish politician (born 1966)

Member of the Riksdag
- Incumbent
- Assumed office 28 September 2026
- Constituency: Västra Götaland County West

Personal details
- Born: 24 August 1966 (age 60) Sweden
- Party: Moderate Party

Anna Vedin (born 24 August 1966) is a Swedish politician from the Moderate Party. She has been a member of the Riksdag since 2026, elected for the Västra Götaland County West constituency.

== Biography ==
Vedin lives in Marstrand and has been active in municipal politics for the Moderate Party in Kungälv Municipality. She has served as an education councillor in the municipality and vice-chair of the committee for education and learning.

Vedin has also been politically active in Region Västra Götaland.

After the 2022 Swedish general election, Vedin was appointed as a deputy in the Riksdag. She served as a deputy from 15 January 2024 to 12 April 2024 and was an additional deputy on the Committee on Civil Affairs during the same period.

In the 2026 Swedish general election, Vedin was elected as a member of parliament for the Västra Götaland County West constituency. She took office on 28 September 2026.

== See also ==
- List of members of the Riksdag, 2026–2030
