= Jessica Wetterling =

Swedish politician (born 1986)

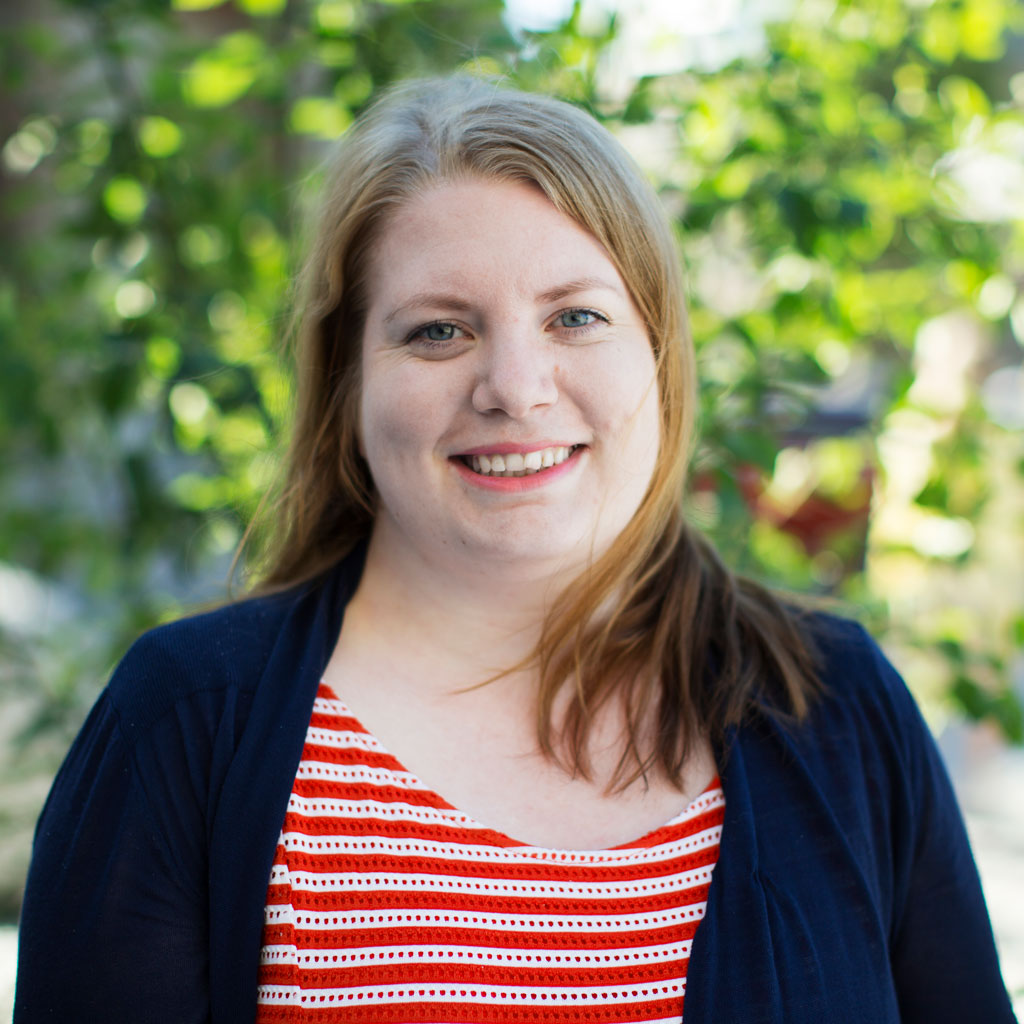

MP for Västra Götaland County West
- Incumbent
- Assumed office 2018

Personal details
- Born: 1 December 1986 (age 39)
- Party: Left Party

Jessica Wetterling (born 1 December 1986) is a Swedish politician from the Left Party, who has been a member of the Riksdag from Västra Götaland County West since 2018.

She was also elected as Member of the Riksdag in September 2022.

== See also ==
- List of members of the Riksdag, 2018–2022
