= Elving Andersson =

Swedish politician (born 1953)

Member of the Riksdag
- In office 1982–1998

Personal details
- Born: 2 April 1953 (age 72) Sweden
- Party: Centre

Elving Andersson (born 2 April 1953) is a Swedish politician. He is a member of the Centre Party. Andersson was a member of the Parliament of Sweden between 1982 and 1998.
