= Rosita Runegrund =

Swedish politician (born 1947)

Rosita Runegrund (born 1947) is a Swedish Christian Democratic politician. She has been a member of the Riksdag since 1998. Rosita also sits on the Executive Committee of AWEPA.
