= Lars Tysklind =

Swedish politician (born 1953)

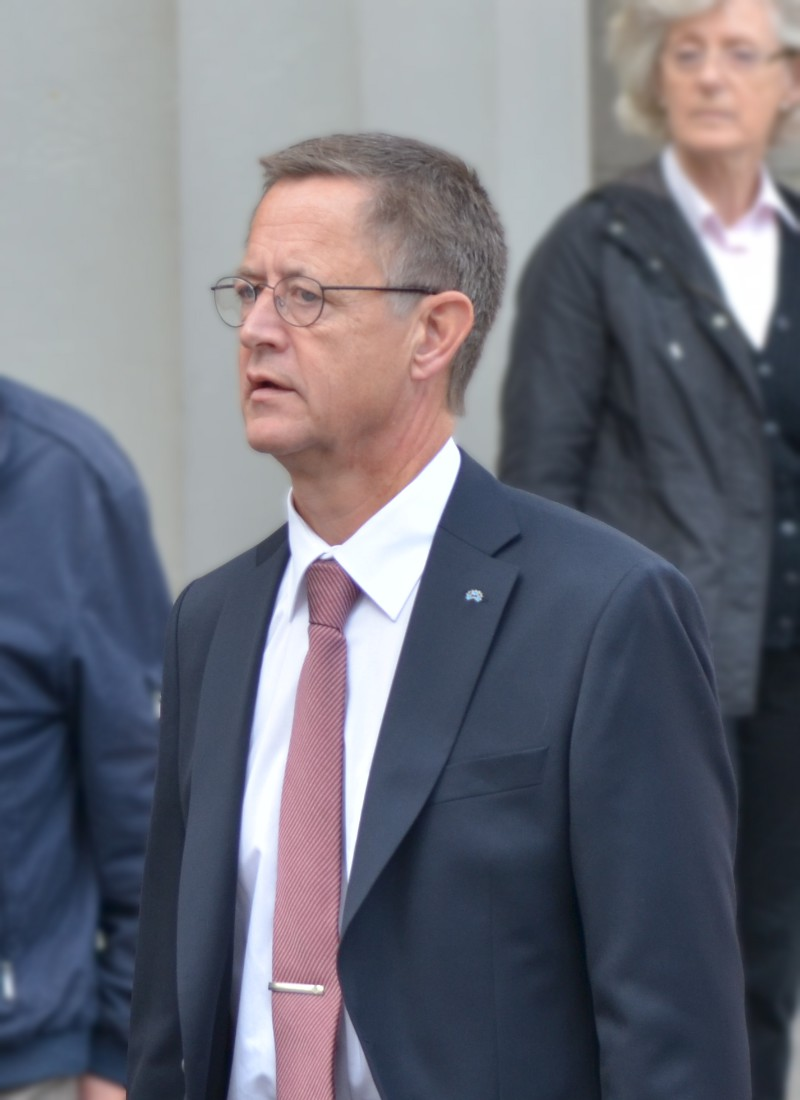

member of the Riksdag
- In office 2002–2018

Personal details
- Political party: Liberal People's Party
- Occupation: dentist

Lars Tysklind (born 1953) is a Swedish Liberal People's Party politician, member of the Riksdag from 2002 to 2018. Tysklind is a dentist.
