= Maria Plass =

Swedish politician (born 1953)

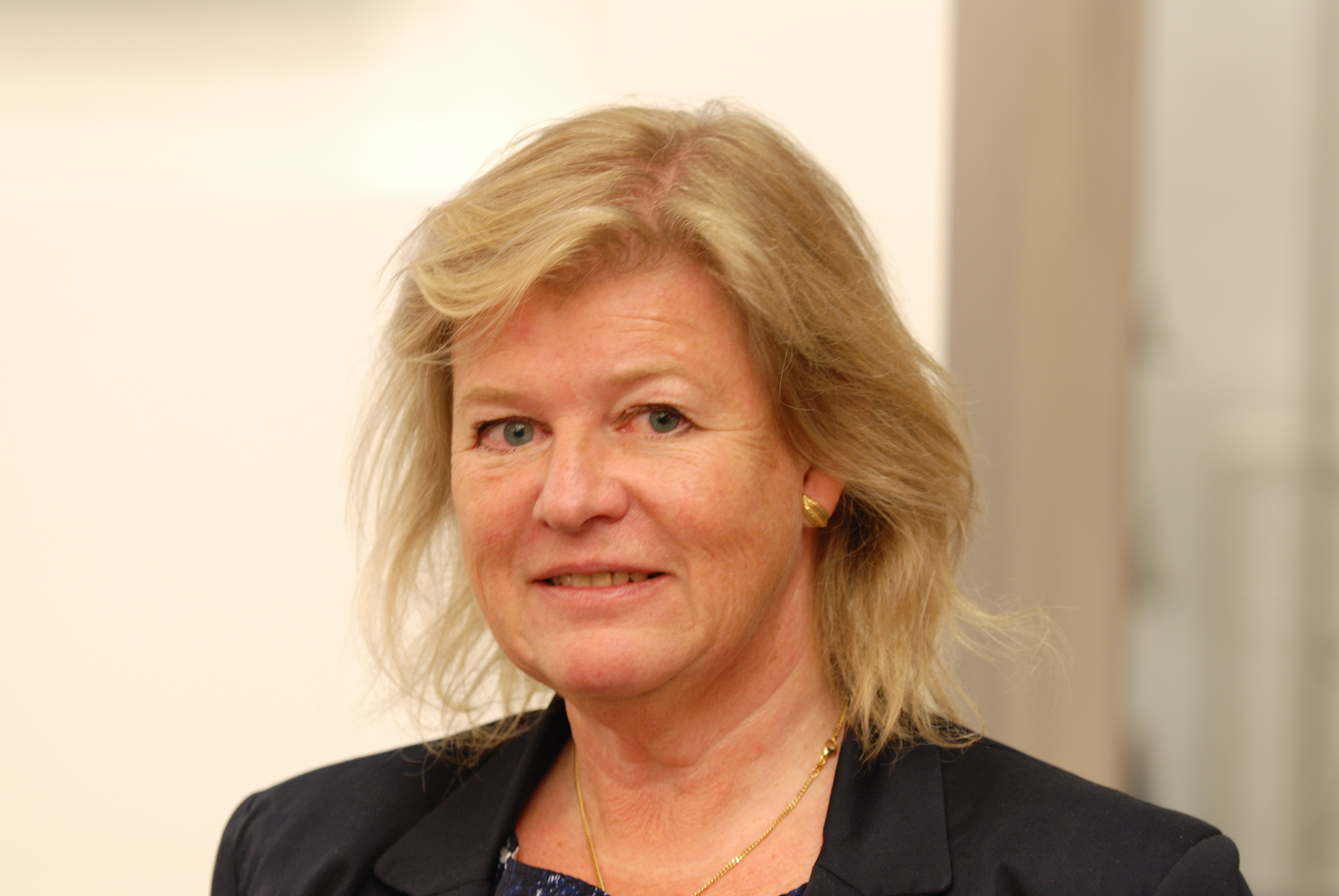

member of the Riksdag
- In office 2006–2018

Personal details
- Political party: Moderate Party

Maria Plass (born 1953) is a Swedish Moderate Party politician. She was member of the Riksdag from 2006 to 2018.
