= Jan-Olof Larsson =

Swedish politician (born 1951)

member of the Riksdag
- In office 2002–2017

Personal details
- Political party: Social Democratic

Jan-Olof Larsson, born 1951, is a Swedish Social Democratic politician who has been a member of the Riksdag from 30 September 2002 until 9 January 2017.
