= Wiwi-Anne Johansson =

Swedish politician (born 1950)

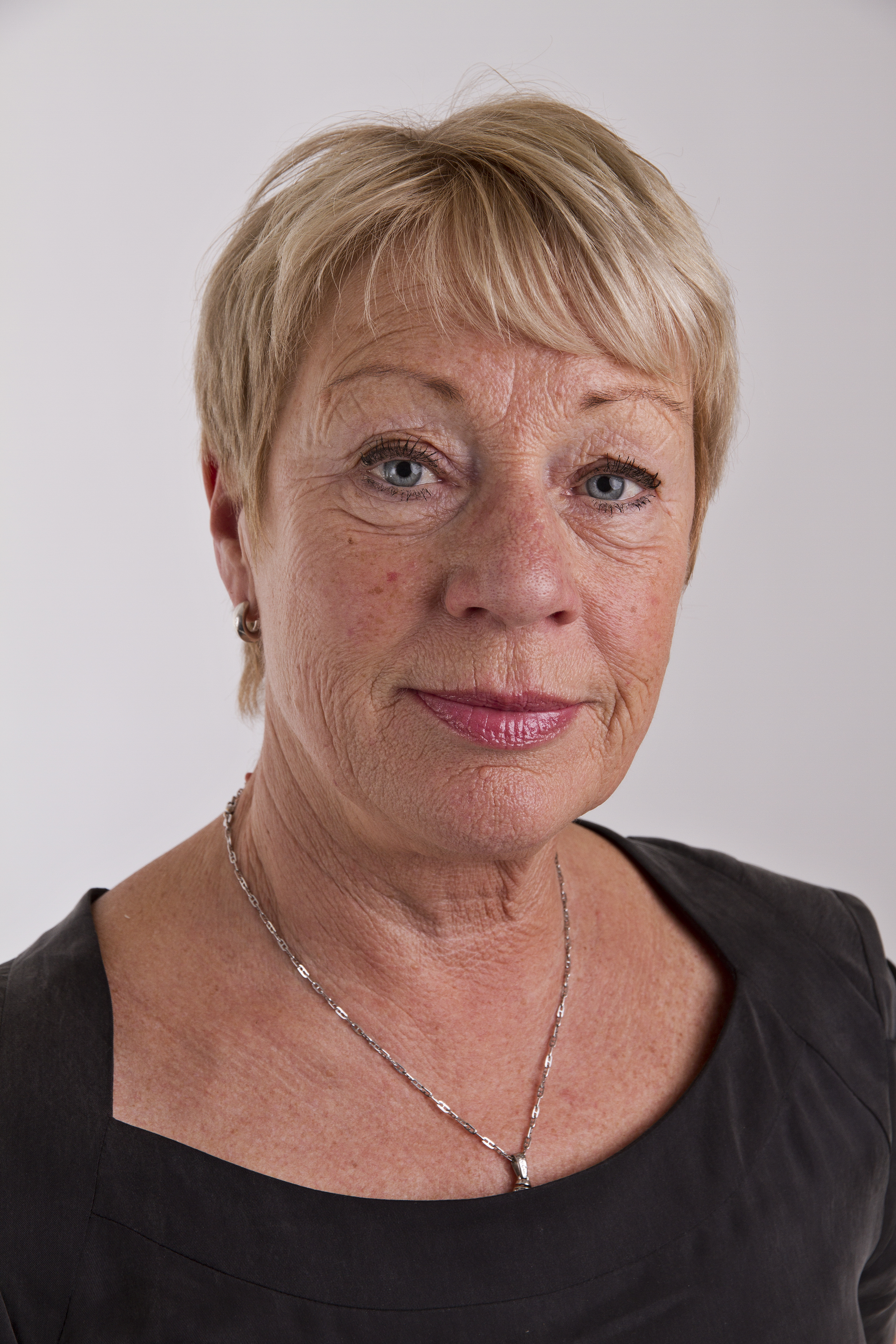

Member of the Riksdag
- In office 2006–2017

Personal details
- Born: 1950 (age 74–75)
- Party: Left Party

Wiwi-Anne Johansson (born 1950) is a Swedish Left Party politician. She was a member of the Riksdag from 2006 to 2017.
