= Kent Olsson (politician) =

Swedish politician (born 1944)

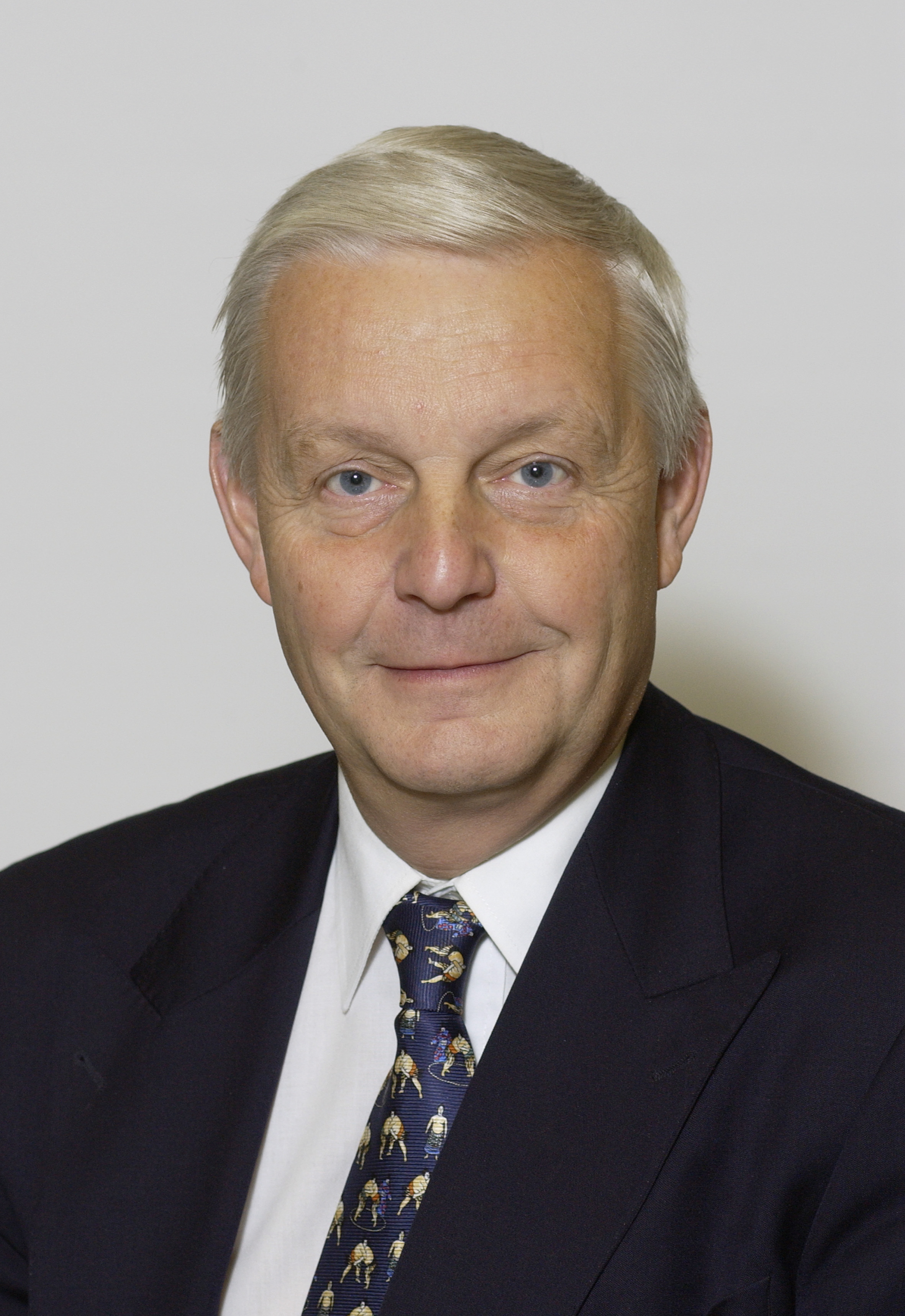

Kent Olsson (born 1944) is a Swedish politician of the Moderate Party. He has been a member of the Riksdag since 1991.
