= List of former members of the Riksdag =

This is an incomplete list of all people who previously served in the Riksdag.

== A ==
Representative	Lifespan	Profession	Party	Years	Constituency
Ulla-Britt Åbark			Social Democratic Party	1982–2002	
Elisa Abascal Reyes			Green Party	1994–1998	
Anton Abele			Moderate Party	2010–2014	
Georg Åberg			People's Party	1971–1982	
Rolf Åbjörnsson			Christian Democrats	1994–2002	
Karl Gustav Abramsson			Social Democratic Party	1998–2010	
Tina Acketoft			Liberal People's Party	2002–2014	
Erik Adamsson			Social Democratic Party	1971–1979	
Christer Adelsbo			Social Democratic Party	2002–2014	
Ulf Adelsohn			Moderate Party	1982–1988	
Lena Adelsohn Liljeroth			Moderate Party	2002–2014	
Berit Adolfsson			Moderate Party	1998–2002	
Tage Adolfsson			Moderate Party	1971–1982	
Carina Adolfsson Elgestam			Social Democratic Party	1998–2014	
Amanda Agestav			Christian Democrats	1998–2002	
Per Arne Aglert			People's Party	1985–1988	
Jan Erik Ågren			Christian Democrats	1991–1994; 1998–2002	
Åsa Ågren Wikström			Moderate Party	2010–2014	
Lars Ahlmark			Moderate Party	1979–1991	
Per Ahlmark			People's Party	1971–1979	
Birgitta Ahlqvist			Social Democratic Party	1998–2006	
Johnny Ahlqvist			Social Democratic Party	1985–2002	
Rigmor Ahlstedt			Centre Party	1994–1998	
Lars Ahlström			Moderate Party	1982–1991	
Annika Åhnberg			Left Party-Communists	1988–2002	
Karin Ahrland			People's Party	1976–1991	
Christer Akej			Moderate Party	2010–2014	
Sven Åkerfeldt			Centre Party	1971–1973	
Sven Eric Åkerfeldt			Centre Party	1973–1982	
Anna Åkerhielm			Moderate Party	1994–2002	
Allan Åkerlind			Moderate Party	1971–1985	
Abir Al-Sahlani			Centre Party	2010–2014	
Stig Alemyr			Social Democratic Party	1971–2002	
Thoralf Alfsson			Sweden Democrats	2010–2014	
Stig Alftin			Social Democratic Party	1973–1985	
Sven-Erik Alkemark			Social Democratic Party	1988–1991	
Henry Allard			Social Democratic Party	1971–1979	
Göran Allmér			Moderate Party	1979–1991	
Harald Almgren			Social Democratic Party	1971–1973	
Erik Almqvist	1982–		Sweden Democrats	2010–2013	Västra Götaland County
Hans Alsén			Social Democratic Party	1973–1982	
Lennart Alsén			People's Party	1985–1988	
Peter Althin			Christian Democrats	2002–2010	
Christel Anderberg			Moderate Party	1998–2002	
Ingegerd Anderlund			Social Democratic Party	1985–1991	
Alvar Andersson			Centre Party	1971–1979	
Anders Andersson			Moderate Party	1982–1991	
Anders Andersson			Christian Democrats	1998–2002; 2006–2014	
Arne Andersson			Social Democratic Party	1973–1991	
Arne Andersson			Moderate Party	1973–1998	
Axel Andersson			Social Democratic Party	1976–1998	
Birger Andersson			Centre Party	1988–2002	
Elis Andersson			Centre Party	1973–1985	
Elving Andersson			Centre Party	1982–1998	
Georg Andersson			Social Democratic Party	1971–2002	
Gösta Andersson			Centre Party	1971–1988	
Hans Andersson			Left Party	1994–2002	
Ingrid Andersson			Social Democratic Party	1982–1998	
Jan Andersson			Social Democratic Party	1988–2002	
Jan Andersson			Centre Party	2002–2010	
John Andersson			Left Party-Communists	1979–1988; 1991–1994	
Jörgen Andersson			Social Democratic Party	1998–2002	
Karin Andersson			Centre Party	1971–1985	
Karl-Gustav Andersson			Social Democratic Party	1971–1976	
Kerstin Andersson			Social Democratic Party	1973–1982	
Kerstin Andersson			Centre Party	1973–1985	
Lars Andersson			New Democracy	1991–1994	
Lennart Andersson			Social Democratic Party	1971–1991	
Magdalena Andersson			Moderate Party	2002–2014	
Majvi Andersson			Social Democratic Party	1994–1998	
Margareta Andersson			Centre Party	1994–2006	
Marianne Andersson			Centre Party	1985–2002	
Marianne Andersson			Social Democratic Party	1988–1991	
Max Andersson			Green Party	2006–2010	
Monica Andersson			Social Democratic Party	1982–1988	
Rolf Andersson			Centre Party	1979–1982	
Ruth Andersson			Social Democratic Party	1971–1973	
Sivert Andersson			Social Democratic Party	1976–1985	
Sten Andersson			Social Democratic Party	1971–2002	
Sten Andersson			Moderate Party	1982–2002	
Sven Andersson i Billingsfors			Social Democratic Party	1971–1973	
Sven Andersson			Social Democratic Party	1971–1979	
Sven G. Andersson			People's Party	1971–1982	
Widar Andersson			Social Democratic Party	1998–1998	
Yvonne Andersson			Christian Democrats	1998–2014	
Barbro Andersson Öhrn			Social Democratic Party	1994–2002	
Berit Andnor			Social Democratic Party	1991–1998; 2002–2010	
Gunilla André			Centre Party	1973–1991	
Egon Andreasson			Centre Party	1971–1976	
Kia Andreasson			Green Party	1994–2002	
Martin Andreasson			Liberal People's Party	2002–2006	
Owe Andréasson			Social Democratic Party	1973–2002	
Gunnar Andrén			Liberal People's Party	2002–2014	
Margareta Andrén			People's Party	1988–1991	
Michael Anefur			Christian Democrats	2006–2010	
Kerstin Anér			People's Party	1971–1985	
Staffan Anger			Moderate Party	2006–2014	
Ture Ångqvist			Social Democratic Party	1985–1988	
Lars Ångström			Green Party	1998–2006	
Rune Ångström			People's Party	1971–1988	
Yvonne Ångström			Liberal People's Party	1998–2006	
Arvid Annerås			People's Party	1971–1973	
Ylva Annerstedt			People's Party	1985–2002	
Sven Antby			People's Party	1971–1973	
Johannes Antonsson			Centre Party	1971–1979	
Staffan Appelros			Moderate Party	2006–2010	
Ann Arleklo			Social Democratic Party	2006–2014	
Sture Arnesson			Left Party	1998–2002	
Otto von Arnold			Christian Democrats	2006–2014	
Marita Aronsson			Liberal People's Party	2002–2006	
Bo Arvidson			Moderate Party	1982–1985; 1981–1994	
Eva Arvidsson			Social Democratic Party	1994–2006	
Erik Åsbrink			Social Democratic Party	1998–2002	
Eva Åsbrink			Social Democratic Party	1971–1976	
Ann-Britt Åsebol			Moderate Party	2010–2014	
Nils Åsling			Centre Party	1971–1988	
Sven Aspling			Social Democratic Party	1971–1985	
Göran Åstrand			Moderate Party	1988–2002	
Alice Åström			Left Party	1994–2010	
Karin Åström			Social Democratic Party	2002–2014	
Luciano Astudillo			Social Democratic Party	2002–2010	
Metin Ataseven			Moderate Party	2010–2014	
Stefan Attefall			Christian Democrats	1991–1994; 1998–2014	
Kenneth Attefors			New Democracy	1991–1994	
Gillis Augustsson			Social Democratic Party	1971–1979	
Olle Aulin			Moderate Party	1976–1988	
Nils Fredrik Aurelius			Moderate Party	1994–2006	
Gulan Avci			Liberal People's Party	2006–2010	
Christina Axelsson			Social Democratic Party	1994–1998; 2002–2010	
Gunnar Axén			Moderate Party	1998–2014	

== B ==
Representative	Lifespan	Profession	Party	Years	Constituency
Laila Bäck			Social Democratic Party	1994–2002	
Rune Backlund			Centre Party	1982–2002	
Hans Backman			Liberal People's Party	2002–2014	
Jan Backman			Moderate Party	1998–2002	
Roland Bäckman			Social Democratic Party	2006–2010	
Lars Bäckström			Left Party-Communists	1988–2006	
Maja Bäckström			Social Democratic Party	1979–2002	
Erling Bager			People's Party	1985–1998; 2002–2006	
Helena Bargholtz			Liberal People's Party	2002–2010	
Lars Beckman			Moderate Party	2010–2014	
Lennart Beijer			Left Party	1994–2006	
Cinnika Beiming			Social Democratic Party	1994–2006	
Eva Bengtson Skogsberg			Moderate Party	2006–2014	
Anders Bengtsson			Social Democratic Party	2002–2006	
Bengt Bengtsson			Centre Party	1971–1979	
Hugo Bengtsson			Social Democratic Party	1971–1982	
Ingemund Bengtsson			Social Democratic Party	1971–1988	
Karl Bengtsson			People's Party	1971–1979	
Marita Bengtsson			Social Democratic Party	1985–1988	
Torsten Bengtsson			Centre Party	1971–1982	
Bengt Berg			Left Party	2010–2014	
Heli Berg			Liberal People's Party	2002–2006	
Marianne Berg			Left Party	2006–2014	
Lilly Bergander			Social Democratic Party	1971–1985	
Hugo Bergdahl			People's Party	1982–2002	
Leif Bergdahl			New Democracy	1991–1994	
Astrid Bergegren			Social Democratic Party	1971–1973	
Inga Berggren			Moderate Party	1998–2002	
Mats Berglind			Social Democratic Party	1994–2010	
Frida Berglund			Social Democratic Party	1971–1985	
Rune Berglund			Social Democratic Party	1994–2006	
Mona Berglund Nilsson			Social Democratic Party	1994–2006	
Holger Bergman			Social Democratic Party	1973–1976; 1982–1985	
Per Bergman			Social Democratic Party	1971–1982	
Holger Bergqvist			People's Party	1976–1979	
Jan Bergqvist			Social Democratic Party	1971–2002	
Britta Bergström			People's Party	1971–1973; 1976–1979	
Harald Bergström			Christian Democrats	1991–1994; 1998–2002	
Sven Bergström			Centre Party	1998–2010	
Agneta Berliner			Liberal People's Party	2006–2010	
Nils Berndtson			Left Party-Communists	1971–1988	
Henry Berndtsson			People's Party	1971–1973	
Bo Bernhardsson			Social Democratic Party	1991–1994; 2002–2014	
Stig Bertilsson			Moderate Party	1985–2002	
Carl Bildt			Moderate Party	1979–2002	
Knut Billing			Moderate Party	1979–2002	
Gunnar Biörck			Moderate Party	1976–1985	
Karl-Göran Biörsmark			People's Party	1985–2002	
Charlotta L. Bjälkebring			Left Party	1994–2002	
Britta Bjelle			People's Party	1985–2002	
Anders Björck			Moderate Party	1971–2006	
Gunnar Björk			Centre Party	1971–2002	
Ingvar Björk			Social Democratic Party	1982–2002	
Kaj Björk			Social Democratic Party	1971–1973	
William Björk			Social Democratic Party	1971–1973	
Ulf Björklund			Christian Democrats	1998–2002	
Jan Björkman			Social Democratic Party	1988–2010	
Lars Björkman			Moderate Party	1998–2002	
Lola Björkquist			People's Party	1988–1991	
Ewa Björling			Moderate Party	2002–2014	
Torbjörn Björlund			Left Party	2006–2014	
Eva Björne			Moderate Party	1988–1991; 1994–1998	
Maud Björnemalm			Social Democratic Party	1985–2002	
Leif Björnlod			Green Party	2002–2006	
Elisabeth Björnsdotter Rahm			Moderate Party	2010–2014	
Karl Björzén			Moderate Party	1979–1985	
Laila Bjurling			Social Democratic Party	1994–2010	
Lennart Bladh			Social Democratic Party	1973–1985	
Gustav Blix			Moderate Party	2006–2014	
Lennart Blom			Moderate Party	1979–1988	
Arne Blomkvist			Social Democratic Party	1971–1979	
Raul Blücher			Left Party-Communists	1979–1982	
Thomas Bodström			Social Democratic Party	2002–2014	
Görel Bohlin			Moderate Party	1982–2002	
Sinikka Bohlin			Social Democratic Party	1988–2010	
Britt Bohlin Olsson			Social Democratic Party	1988–2010	
Gösta Bohman			Moderate Party	1971–1991	
Stellan Bojerud	1944–	writer	Sweden Democrats	2010–2011; 2012–2014	Dalarna County
Gunhild Bolander			Centre Party	1982–2002	
Sigrid Bolkéus			Social Democratic Party	1988–1998	
Karl Boo			Centre Party	1971–1988	
Maria Borelius	1960–		Moderate Party	2006	
Bengt Börjesson			Centre Party	1971–1979	
Erik Börjesson			People's Party	1979–1982	
Fritz Börjesson			Centre Party	1971–1979	
Curt Boström			Social Democratic Party	1973–1985	
Lena Boström			Social Democratic Party	1988–2002	
John Bouvin			New Democracy	1991–1994	
Anita Bråkenhielm			Moderate Party	1979–1988	
Claes-Göran Brandin			Social Democratic Party	1994–2010	
Erik Brandt			Social Democratic Party	1971–1973	
Roland Brännström			Social Democratic Party	1971–1991	
Charlotte Branting			People's Party	1985–2002	
Agneta Brendt			Social Democratic Party	1994–1998	
Cecilia Brinck			Moderate Party	2010–2014	
Josefin Brink			Left Party	2006–2014	
Sven Britton			Social Democratic Party	2010–2014	
Anita Brodén			Liberal People's Party	2002–2014	
Anne Marie Brodén			Moderate Party	2002–2014	
Johan Brohult			New Democracy	1991–1994	
Lennart Brunander			Centre Party	1979–1998	
Paul Brundin			Moderate Party	1971–1973	
Sven Brus			Christian Democrats	2002–2006	
Staffan Burenstam Linder			Moderate Party	1971–1985	
Ingrid Burman			Left Party	1994–2006	

== C ==
Representative	Lifespan	Profession	Party	Years	Constituency
Lisbet Calner			Social Democratic Party	1982–2002	
Stefan Caplan			Moderate Party	2010–2014	
Andreas Carlgren			Centre Party	1994–1998; 2010–2014	
Nils Carlshamre			Moderate Party	1971–1988	
Leif Carlson			Moderate Party	1998–2002	
Birgitta Carlsson			Centre Party	1998–2006	
Clas-Göran Carlsson			Social Democratic Party	2010–2014	
Eric Carlsson	1914–2006	farmer	Centre Party	1971–1979	Kopparberg County
Gösta Carlsson			Centre Party	1971–1973	
Gunilla Carlsson			Moderate Party	2002–2014	
Inge Carlsson			Social Democratic Party	1982–2002	
Ingvar Carlsson			Social Democratic Party	1971–2002	
Kent Carlsson			Social Democratic Party	1998–2002	
Roine Carlsson			Social Democratic Party	1985–2002	
Sivert Carlsson			Centre Party	1994–1998	
Rune Carlstein			Social Democratic Party	1971–1985	
Marianne Carlström			Social Democratic Party	1998–2006	
Valdo Carlström			People's Party	1971–1976	
Åke Carnerö			Christian Democrats	1998–2002	
Hadar Cars			People's Party	1985–1991	
Anders Castberger			People's Party	1985–1991	
Bodil Ceballos			Green Party	2006–2014	
Wivi-Anne Cederqvist			Social Democratic Party	1976–1988	
Charlotte Cederschiöld			Moderate Party	1988–2002	
Sebastian Cederschiöld			Moderate Party	2006–2010	
Alexander Chrisopoulos			Left Party-Communists	1979–1991	
Paul Ciszuk			Green Party	1988–1991	
Tore Claeson			Left Party-Communists	1973–1988	
Viola Claesson			Left Party-Communists	1985–1991	
Rolf Clarkson			Moderate Party	1971–2002	
Harriet Colliander			New Democracy	1991–1994	

== D ==
Representative	Lifespan	Profession	Party	Years	Constituency
Birgitta Dahl			Social Democratic Party	1971–2002	
Rolf Dahlberg			Moderate Party	1976–1998	
Thure Dahlberg			Social Democratic Party	1971–1976	
Bertil Dahlén			People's Party	1976–1982	
Olle Dahlén			People's Party	1971–1976	
Anders Dahlgren			Centre Party	1971–1985	
Kjell Dahlström			Green Party	1988–1991	
Lennart Daléus			Centre Party	1998–2002	
Cecilia Dalman Eek			Social Democratic Party	2010–2014	
Bengt Dalström			New Democracy	1991–1994	
Georg Danell			Moderate Party	1973–1982	
Britt-Marie Danestig			Left Party	1994–2006	
Bertil Danielsson			Moderate Party	1979–2002	
Peter Danielsson			Moderate Party	2002–2010	
Staffan Danielsson			Centre Party	2002–2014	
Torgny Danielsson			Social Democratic Party	1994–2002	
Siri Dannaeus			Liberal People's Party	1994–1998	
Linnéa Darell			Liberal People's Party	2002–2006	
Axel Darvik			Liberal People's Party	2002–2006	
Hans Dau			Moderate Party	1985–2002	
Inger Davidson			Christian Democrats	1998–2010	
Ingrid Diesen			Moderate Party	1973–1979	
Robert Dockered			Centre Party	1971–1973	
Sedat Dogru			Moderate Party	2010–2014	
Åsa Domeij			Green Party	1988–1991; 2002–2006	
Bino Drummond			Moderate Party	2010–2014	
Anne-Katrine Dunker			Moderate Party	1998–2002	

== E ==
Representative	Lifespan	Profession	Party	Years	Constituency
Margitta Edgren			People's Party	1985–1988; 1991–1998	
Louise Edlind-Friberg			Liberal People's Party	2002–2006	
Erik Arthur Egervärn			Centre Party	1994–2002	
Alf Egnerfors			Social Democratic Party	1988–2002	
Tina Ehn			Green Party	2006–2014	
Magnus Ehrencrona			Green Party	2010–2014	
Mats Einarsson			Left Party	1998–2006	
Jerzy Einhorn			Christian Democrats	1998–2002	
Christer Eirefelt			People's Party	1979–1998	
Ulla Ekelund			Centre Party	1973–1985	
Maud Ekendahl			Moderate Party	1994–2006	
Berndt Ekholm			Social Democratic Party	1985–2006	
Bernt Ekinge			People's Party	1971–1982	
Kerstin Ekman			People's Party	1979–1991	
Allan Ekström			Moderate Party	1982–1991	
Anne-Marie Ekström			Liberal People's Party	2002–2006	
Sven Ekström			Social Democratic Party	1971–1976	
Kjell Eldensjö			Christian Democrats	1991–1994; 1998–2002; 2006–2010	
Anna Eliasson			Centre Party	1973–1982	
Ingemar Eliasson			People's Party	1982–1991	
Lars Eliasson			Centre Party	1971–1973	
Stina Eliasson			Centre Party	1979–1982; 1998–1994	
Lars Elinderson			Moderate Party	1998–2002; 2006–2014	
Ingegerd Elm			Social Democratic Party	1979–2002	
Catharina Elmsäter-Svärd			Moderate Party	1998–2014	
Claes Elmstedt			Centre Party	1971–1985	
Arvid Enarsson			Moderate Party	1971–1973	
Gunnar Engkvist			Social Democratic Party	1971–1973	
Kerstin Engle			Social Democratic Party	2002–2014	
Barbro Engman			Social Democratic Party	1973–1979	
Lars Engqvist			Social Democratic Party	2002–2006	
Bror Engström			Left Party-Communists	1971–1973	
Göran Engström			Centre Party	1988–1991	
Marie Engström			Left Party	1994–2010	
Odd Engström			Social Democratic Party	1998–2002	
Eric Enlund			People's Party	1971–1982	
Annelie Enochson			Christian Democrats	2002–2014	
Carl-Gustav Enskog			People's Party	1971–1973	
Björn Ericson			Social Democratic Party	1988–1991; 1994–1998	
Dag Ericson			Social Democratic Party	1994–1998	
Gunvor G. Ericson			Green Party	2006–2014	
Lars-Ivar Ericson			Centre Party	2002–2010	
Sture Ericson			Social Democratic Party	1971–2002	
Dan Ericsson			Christian Democrats	1998–2002	
Göran Ericsson			Moderate Party	1982–1991	
Gunnar Ericsson			People's Party	1971–1973	
Kjell Ericsson			Centre Party	1988–1998	
Alf Eriksson			Social Democratic Party	1994–2010	
Berith Eriksson			Left Party-Communists	1988–2002	
Birgitta Eriksson			Social Democratic Party	2006–2010	
Christer Eriksson			Centre Party	2006–2010	
Dan Eriksson			New Democracy	1991–1994	
Erik A. Eriksson			Centre Party	2006–2014	
Eva Eriksson			Liberal People's Party	1994–1998	
Ingvar Eriksson			Moderate Party	1979–2002	
Jens Eriksson			Moderate Party	1979–1991	
John Eriksson i Bäckmora			Centre Party	1971–1976	
Jonas Eriksson			Green Party	2010–2014	
Karl Erik Eriksson	1925–2010	farmer	People's Party	1971–1988	Värmland County
Nancy Eriksson			Social Democratic Party	1971–1973	
Olle Eriksson			Centre Party	1971–1982	
Ove Eriksson			Moderate Party	1982–1985	
Per-Ola Eriksson			Centre Party	1982–1998	
Peter Eriksson			Green Party	1994–2014	
Stig Eriksson			Left Party	1998–2002	
Ulf Eriksson			New Democracy	1991–1994	
Tage Erlander			Social Democratic Party	1971–1973	
Christer Erlandsson			Social Democratic Party	1994–1998; 2002–2006	
Lars Ernestam			People's Party	1982–1991	
Gudmund Ernulf			People's Party	1971–1973	
Jan Ertsborn			Liberal People's Party	2002–2014	
Björn von der Esch			Christian Democrats	1998–2006	
Arvid Eskel			Social Democratic Party	1971–1973	
Gustaf von Essen			Moderate Party	1998–2002	
Rune Evensson			Social Democratic Party	1982–1998	
Barbro Evermo			Social Democratic Party	1985–1988	
Lahja Exner			Social Democratic Party	1979–2002	

== F ==
Representative	Lifespan	Profession	Party	Years	Constituency
Anton Fågelsbo			Centre Party	1971–1979	
Bengt Fagerlund			Social Democratic Party	1971–1979	
Ann-Marie Fagerström			Social Democratic Party	1994–2006	
Mahmood Fahmi			Moderate Party	2006–2010	
Karin Falkmer			Moderate Party	1985–2002	
Thorbjörn Fälldin			Centre Party	1971–1985	
Fredrick Federley			Centre Party	2006–2014	
Kjell-Olof Feldt			Social Democratic Party	1971–1991	
Barbro Feltzing			Green Party	1994–2006	
Bo Finnkvist			Social Democratic Party	1982–1998	
Bertil Fiskesjö			Centre Party	1971–2002	
Anders Flanking			Centre Party	2010–2014	
Elisabeth Fleetwood			Moderate Party	1979–2002	
Karin Flodström			Social Democratic Party	1979–1985	
Eva Flyborg			Liberal People's Party	1994–2014	
Margareta Fogelberg			People's Party	1985–1991	
Juan Fonseca			Social Democratic Party	1994–1998	
Ruth Forsling			Liberal People's Party	1964	
Bo Forslund			Social Democratic Party	1976–2002	
Patrik Forslund			Moderate Party	2006–2010	
Ingegärd Frænkel			People's Party	1971–1979	
Hans Göran Franck			Social Democratic Party	1985–2002	
Bodil Francke Ohlsson			Green Party	1994–1998	
Berit Frändås			Social Democratic Party	1973–1976	
Bo Frank			Moderate Party	1998–2002	
Joe Frans			Social Democratic Party	2002–2006	
Arne Fransson			Centre Party	1971–1985	
Jan Fransson			Social Democratic Party	1979–2002	
Sonja Fransson			Social Democratic Party	1994–2006	
Ivar Franzén			Centre Party	1979–2002	
Jan-Olof Franzén			Moderate Party	1994–1998	
Karola Franzén			Green Party	1988–1991	
Mia Franzén			Liberal People's Party	2002–2006	
Oscar Franzén			Social Democratic Party	1971–1976	
Tommy Franzén			Left Party-Communists	1976–1988	
Rose-Marie Frebran			Christian Democrats	1998–2002	
Sonja Fredgardh			Centre Party	1973–1979	
Märta Fredrikson			Centre Party	1973–1982	
Torsten Fredriksson			Social Democratic Party	1971–1976	
Lennart Fremling			Liberal People's Party	1991–1998; 2002–2006	
Carl Frick			Green Party	1988–1991	
Egon Frid			Left Party	2006–2010	
Lennart Fridén			Moderate Party	1998–2002	
Filip Fridolfsson			Moderate Party	1973–1979; 1982–2002	
Nils Fridolfsson			Social Democratic Party	1971–1973	
Birgit Friggebo			People's Party	1979–1982; 1985–1998	
Helena Frisk			Social Democratic Party	1994–2006	
Viola Furubjelke			Social Democratic Party	1985–2002	
Reynoldh Furustrand			Social Democratic Party	1985–2006	

== G ==
Representative	Lifespan	Profession	Party	Years	Constituency
Aleksander Gabelic			Social Democratic Party	2006–2010	
Arne Gadd			Social Democratic Party	1971–1991	
Per Gahrton			People's Party; Green Party	1976–1979; 1988–1991; 1994–1995	
Margareta Gard			Moderate Party	1979–1988; 1991–1994	
Ingela Gardner			Moderate Party	1985–1988	
Inge Garstedt			Moderate Party	2006–2010	
Torsten Gavelin			Liberal People's Party	1994–1998	
Lars De Geer			People's Party	1985–1991	
Arne Geijer			Social Democratic Party	1971–1976	
Lennart Geijer			Social Democratic Party	1971–1976	
Kerstin Gellerman			People's Party	1985–1988	
Margit Gennser			Moderate Party	1982–2002	
Mats Gerdau			Moderate Party	2006–2014	
Viviann Gerdin			Centre Party	1998–2006	
Anders Gernandt			Centre Party	1971–1976; 1979–1982	
Birgitta Gidblom			Social Democratic Party	1994–1998	
Åke Gillström			Social Democratic Party	1973–1979	
Erik Glimnér			Centre Party	1971–1979	
Sigge Godin			People's Party	1985–1998	
Eva Goës			Green Party	1988–1991; 1994–1998	
Bengt Göransson			Social Democratic Party	1985–1991	
Olle Göransson			Social Democratic Party	1971–1988	
Kerstin Göthberg			Centre Party	1973–1988	
Gunnar Goude			Green Party	1994–2002	
Paul Grabö			Centre Party	1971–1973	
Anita Gradin			Social Democratic Party	1971–2002	
Carl Fredrik Graf			Moderate Party	1998–2002	
Olle Grahn			People's Party	1979–1991	
Lars U. Granberg			Social Democratic Party	1994–2010	
Karin Granbom			Liberal People's Party	2002–2014	
Pär Granstedt			Centre Party	1973–2002	
Per Erik Granström			Social Democratic Party	1994–2006	
Ulf Grape			Moderate Party	2006–2010	
Stig Grauers			Moderate Party	1998–1998	
Erik Grebäck			Centre Party	1971–1973	
Åke Green			Social Democratic Party	1971–1982	
Lisbeth Grönfeldt Bergman			Moderate Party	2006–2010	
Nils-Olof Grönhagen			Social Democratic Party	1979–1982	
Anna Grönlund Krantz			Liberal People's Party	2002–2006	
Nic Grönvall			Moderate Party	1982–2002	
Rolf Gunnarsson			Moderate Party	1994–2010	
Sven Gustafson			People's Party	1971–1976	
Allan Gustafsson			Centre Party	1971–1979	
Billy Gustafsson			Social Democratic Party	2002–2014	
Gösta Gustafsson			Social Democratic Party	1973–1976	
Gunnar Gustafsson			Social Democratic Party	1971–1976	
Hans Gustafsson			Social Democratic Party	1976–2002	
Holger Gustafsson			Christian Democrats	1998–2010	
Lars Gustafsson			Social Democratic Party	1971–1991	
Lars Gustafsson			Christian Democrats	1998–2014	
Nils-Eric Gustafsson			Centre Party	1971–1976	
Nils-Olof Gustafsson			Social Democratic Party	1979–2002	
Stig Gustafsson			Social Democratic Party	1982–1988	
Torsten Gustafsson			Centre Party	1971–1982	
Wilhelm Gustafsson			People's Party	1976–1982	
Åke Gustavsson			Social Democratic Party	1971–2002	
Bengt Gustavsson			Social Democratic Party	1971–1982	
Gusti Gustavsson			Social Democratic Party	1971–1976	
Lennart Gustavsson			Left Party	1998–2006	
Rune Gustavsson			Centre Party	1971–1985	
Stina Gustavsson			Centre Party	1982–2002	
Johnny Gylling			Christian Democrats	1998–2006	

== H ==
Representative	Lifespan	Profession	Party	Years	Constituency
Pontus Haag			Moderate Party	2010–2014	
Walburga Habsburg Douglas	1958–	lawyer	Moderate Party	2006–2014	Södermanland County
Susanna Haby			Moderate Party	2010–2014	
Birger Hagård			Moderate Party	1982–1998	
Christin Hagberg			Social Democratic Party	2002–2010	
Helge Hagberg			Social Democratic Party	1973–1991	
Lars-Ove Hagberg			Left Party-Communists	1971–2002	
Liselott Hagberg			Liberal People's Party	2002–2014	
Michael Hagberg			Social Democratic Party	1994–2010	
Rolf Hagel			Left Party-Communists	1976–1979	
Eric Hägelmark			People's Party	1979–1985	
Catharina Hagen			Moderate Party	1998–2002	
Stefan Hagfeldt			Moderate Party	1998–2006	
Carina Hägg			Social Democratic Party	1994–2014	
Siri Häggmark			Moderate Party	1979–1988	
Sören Häggroth			Social Democratic Party	1982–1985	
Kerstin Haglö			Social Democratic Party	2002–2014	
Anders Haglund			Social Democratic Party	1971–1976	
Ann-Cathrine Haglund			Moderate Party	1979–2002	
Hans Hagnell			Social Democratic Party	1956–1973	
Caroline Hagström			Christian Democrats	1998–2002	
Karl Hagström			Social Democratic Party	1988–1998	
Ulla-Britt Hagström			Christian Democrats	1998–2002	
Alfred Håkansson			Centre Party	1971–1979	
Margot Håkansson			People's Party	1976–1982	
Per Olof Håkansson			Social Democratic Party	1973–1998	
Karl-Erik Häll			Social Democratic Party	1971–1985	
Ingemar Hallenius			Centre Party	1973–1985	
Karl Hallgren			Left Party-Communists	1971–1979	
Isa Halvarsson			People's Party	1988–1998	
Birgitta Hambraeus			Centre Party	1973–1998	
Björn Hamilton	1945–	engineer	Moderate Party	2002–2010	Stockholm County
Carl B. Hamilton	1946–	Ph.D., economist	Liberal People's Party	1991–1993; 1994; 1997–1998; 2002–2014	Stockholm Municipality
Bo Hammar			Left Party-Communists	1985–1991	
Britta Hammarbacken			Centre Party	1976–1988	
Sven Hammarberg			Social Democratic Party	1971–1976	
Matz Hammarström			Green Party	1998–2002	
Mac Hamrin			People's Party	1971–1973	
Agne Hansson			Centre Party	1982–2006	
Bertil Hansson			People's Party	1979–1982	
Håkan Hansson			Centre Party	1988–1991	
Ing-Marie Hansson			Social Democratic Party	1979–1988	
Lilly Hansson			Social Democratic Party	1971–1985	
Nils G. Hansson	1902–1981	farmer	Centre Party	1971–1973	Malmöhus County
Roy Hansson			Moderate Party	1998–2002	
Bengt Harding Olson			People's Party	1985–1998	
Maria Hassan			Social Democratic Party	2002–2006	
Ingrid Hasselström-Nyvall			People's Party	1985–1991	
Doris Håvik			Social Democratic Party	1971–2002	
Evert Hedberg			Social Democratic Party	1973–1988	
Lars Hedfors			Social Democratic Party	1979–1998	
Carl-Eric Hedin			Moderate Party	1971–1973	
Ewa Hedkvist Petersen			Social Democratic Party	1985–2002	
Carl Erik Hedlund			Moderate Party	1994–2002	
Gunnar Hedlund			Centre Party	1971–1976	
Lennart Hedquist			Moderate Party	1994–2010	
Lotta Hedström			Green Party	2002–2006	
Uno Hedström			Social Democratic Party	1971–1976	
Hugo Hegeland			Moderate Party	1982–2002	
Kerstin Heinemann			Liberal People's Party	1994–2006	
Chris Heister			Moderate Party	1998–2006	
Gunnar Helén			People's Party	1971–1976	
Owe Hellberg			Left Party	1994–2006	
Solveig Hellquist			Liberal People's Party	2002–2010	
Mats Hellström			Social Democratic Party	1971–2002	
Gun Hellsvik			Moderate Party	1994–2002	
Ingrid Hemmingsson			Moderate Party	1982–2002	
Martin Henmark			People's Party	1971–1979	
Einar Henningsson			Social Democratic Party	1971–1973	
Sven Henricsson			Left Party-Communists	1979–1985	
Lars Henrikson			Social Democratic Party	1971–1982	
Birgit Henriksson			Moderate Party	1998–2002	
C.-H. Hermansson	1917–	party leader, editor-in-chief	Left Party-Communists	1971–1985	City of Stockholm
Ivar Hermansson			Left Party-Communists	1971–1973	
Allan Hernelius			Moderate Party	1971–1982	
Inger Hestvik			Social Democratic Party	1982–2002	
Tom Heyman			Moderate Party	1988–2002	
Barbro Hietala Nordlund			Social Democratic Party	1994–1998; 2002–2006	
Helena Hillar Rosenqvist			Green Party	1998–2006	
Birgit Hjalmarsson			Social Democratic Party	1973–1976	
Lena Hjelm-Wallén			Social Democratic Party	1971–2002	
Eva Hjelmström			Left Party-Communists	1976–1985	
Lars Hjertén			Moderate Party	1982–1985; 1994–2002	
Nils Hjorth			Social Democratic Party	1971–1982	
Hans Hjortzberg-Nordlund			Moderate Party	1994–2002	
Ulla Hoffmann			Left Party	1994–2006	
Anders G. Högmark			Moderate Party	1979–2006	
Ivar Högström			Social Democratic Party	1971–1979	
Tomas Högström			Moderate Party	1994–2006	
Helena Höij			Christian Democrats	1998–2006	
Gunnar Hökmark	1952–		Moderate Party	1982–2004	Stockholm County, Stockholm Municipality
Ulf Holm			Green Party	2002–2014	
Siv Holma			Left Party	1998–2014	
Bo Holmberg			Social Democratic Party	1985–2002	
Håkan Holmberg			People's Party	1988–1998	
Yngve Holmberg			Moderate Party	1971–1973	
Erik Holmkvist			Moderate Party	1985–1991	
Eric Holmqvist			Social Democratic Party	1971–1982	
Mary Holmqvist			Social Democratic Party	1971–1976	
Nils-Göran Holmqvist			Social Democratic Party	1994–2006	
Lennart Holmsten			Social Democratic Party	1985–1988	
Nils Hörberg			People's Party	1971–1979	
Linnea Hörlén			People's Party	1973–1985	
Anna Horn af Rantzien			Moderate Party	1988–1991	
Börje Hörnlund			Centre Party	1976–2002	
Gördis Hörnlund			Social Democratic Party	1971–1979	
Erik Hovhammar			Moderate Party	1971–1988	
Kurt Hugosson			Social Democratic Party	1971–1985	
Sven Hulterström			Social Democratic Party	1985–1991; 1994–2002	
Bengt Hurtig			Left Party	1998–1998	
Eivor Husing			Social Democratic Party	1988–1991	
Cristina Husmark Pehrsson			Moderate Party	1998–2002; 2006–2014	
Gunnar Hyltander			People's Party	1971–1976	
Jan Hyttring			Centre Party	1982–1991	

== I ==
Representative	Lifespan	Profession	Party	Years	Constituency
Anna Ibrisagic			Moderate Party	2002–2006	
Inger Ingvar-Svensson			Centre Party	1973–1976	
Margó Ingvardsson			Left Party-Communists	1982–1991	
Ingbritt Irhammar			Centre Party	1985–1991; 1994–1998	
Lars Isovaara	1959–		Sweden Democrats	2010–2012	Uppsala County
Karin Israelsson			Centre Party	1979–1991; 1994–1998	
Margareta Israelsson			Social Democratic Party	1985–2010	
Per Israelsson			Left Party-Communists	1971–1976; 1979–1985	

== J ==
Representative	Lifespan	Profession	Party	Years	Constituency
Egon Jacobsson			Social Democratic Party	1979–1985	
Magnus Jacobsson			Christian Democrats	1998–2002	
Ulla Jacobsson			Moderate Party	1973–1976	
Thure Jadestig			Social Democratic Party	1971–1985	
Erik Jansson			Social Democratic Party	1985–1991	
Laila Jansson			New Democracy	1991–1994	
Paul Jansson			Social Democratic Party	1971–1985	
Inger Jarl Beck			Social Democratic Party	2002–2010	
Henrik S. Järrel			Moderate Party	1998–2006	
Bo G. Jenevall			New Democracy	1991–1994	
Jan Jennehag			Left Party-Communists	1985–1998	
Karin Jeppsson			Social Democratic Party	1998–2002	
Isabella Jernbeck			Moderate Party	2006–2014	
Renée Jeryd			Social Democratic Party	2006–2010	
Berit Jóhannesson			Left Party	1998–2006	
Anita Johansson			Social Democratic Party	1979–2006	
Ann-Kristine Johansson			Social Democratic Party	1994–2014	
Bengt-Anders Johansson			Moderate Party	2002–2014	
Bertil Johansson			Centre Party	1971–1979	
Birgitta Johansson			Social Democratic Party	1976–1998	
Carl-Axel Johansson			Moderate Party	2002–2006	
Eric Johansson			Social Democratic Party	1971–1973	
Erik Johansson i Simrishamn			Social Democratic Party	1971–1985	
Erik Johansson			Centre Party	1973–1979	
Eva Johansson			Social Democratic Party	1988–2002	
Filip Johansson			Centre Party	1971–1982	
Gunnar Johansson			Moderate Party	1973–1979	
Hilding Johansson			Social Democratic Party	1971–1982	
Inga-Britt Johansson			Social Democratic Party	1982–1998	
Jan Emanuel Johansson			Social Democratic Party	2002–2010	
Johan Johansson i Boden			Moderate Party	2010–2014	
Jörgen Johansson			Centre Party	2002–2010	
Kenneth Johansson			Centre Party	1998–2014	
Kersti Johansson			Centre Party	1982–1991	
Kjell Johansson			People's Party	1982–2002	
Knut Johansson			Social Democratic Party	1971–1979	
Kurt Ove Johansson			Social Democratic Party	1973–1976; 1979–1998	
Lars Johansson			Social Democratic Party	2002–2014	
Larz Johansson			Centre Party	1979–2002	
Magnus Johansson			Social Democratic Party	1994–1998	
Marie-Ann Johansson			Left Party-Communists	1979–1985	
Märta Johansson			Social Democratic Party	1994–2002	
Mats Johansson			Moderate Party	2006–2014	
Mikael Johansson			Green Party	1998–2010	
Olof Johansson			Centre Party	1971–1998	
Robert Johansson, see Robert Dockered
Rune Johansson i Norrköping	1917–1975		Social Democratic Party	1971–1972	Östergötland County
Rune B. Johansson	1915–1982		Social Democratic Party	1971–1979	Kronoberg County
Rune Johansson	1930–2014		Social Democratic Party	1973–1991	Älvsborg County Northern
Sune Johansson			Social Democratic Party	1976–1982	
Sven Johansson			Centre Party	1971–1982	
Tage Johansson			Social Democratic Party	1971–1979	
Tyra Johansson			Social Democratic Party	1973–1985	
Ulla Johansson			Social Democratic Party	1973–1976; 1979–1991	
Jacob Johnson			Left Party	2006–2014	
Ella Johnsson			Centre Party	1976–1985	
Eva Johnsson			Christian Democrats	2006–2010	
Ingvar Johnsson			Social Democratic Party	1982–2002	
Jeppe Johnsson			Moderate Party	1994–2010	
John Johnsson			Social Democratic Party	1973–1988	
Rune Johnsson			Centre Party	1976–1979	
Gunnel Jonäng			Centre Party	1971–1988	
Bertil Jonasson			Centre Party	1971–1988	
Gustaf Jonnergård			Centre Party	1973–1976	
Annika Jonsell			Moderate Party	1994–1998	
Anders Jonsson			People's Party	1971–1976	
Elver Jonsson			People's Party	1971–2002	
Göte Jonsson			Moderate Party	1979–1988; 1991–2002	
Peter Jonsson			Social Democratic Party	2002–2010	
Rune Jonsson			Social Democratic Party	1971–1973; 1976–1991	
Anita Jönsson			Social Democratic Party	1988–2006	
Christine Jönsson			Moderate Party	2006–2014	
Eric Jönsson			Social Democratic Party	1971–1985	
Hans Jönsson			Social Democratic Party	1971–1979	
Marianne Jönsson			Centre Party	1988–2002	
Marianne Jönsson			Social Democratic Party	1994–1998	
Mona Jönsson			Green Party	2002–2006	
Patrik Jönsson			Sweden Democrats	2014	
Kerstin Jordan			Social Democratic Party	1973–1976	
Stig Josefson			Centre Party	1971–1988	
Gösta Josefsson			Social Democratic Party	1971–1973	
Ingemar Josefsson			Social Democratic Party	1973–1976; 1994–2002	
Inger Josefsson			Centre Party	1982–1985	
Robert Jousma			New Democracy	1991–1994	
Thomas Julin			Green Party	1994–2002	
Peter Jutterström			Moderate Party	2010–2014	

== K ==
Representative	Lifespan	Profession	Party	Years	Constituency
Björn Kaaling			Social Democratic Party	1998–1998	
Stefan Käll			Liberal People's Party	2010–2014	
Thorvald Källstad			People's Party	1971–1973	
Ismail Kamil			Liberal People's Party	2010–2014	
Mehmet Kaplan			Green Party	2006–2014	
Sigvard Karlehagen			Centre Party	1973–1976	
Anders Karlsson			Social Democratic Party	1998–2014	
Bert Karlsson	1945–		New Democracy	1991–1994	Östergötland County
Göran Karlsson			Social Democratic Party	1971–1982	
Gösta Karlsson			Centre Party	1973–1979	
Hans Karlsson			Social Democratic Party	1998–2002	
Helge Karlsson			Social Democratic Party	1971–1982	
Ingvar Karlsson			Centre Party	1982–1991	
Kjell-Erik Karlsson			Left Party	1998–2006	
Marianne Karlsson			Centre Party	1973–1988	
Ola Karlsson			Moderate Party	1994–2002	
Ove Karlsson			Social Democratic Party	1971–1991	
Rinaldo Karlsson			Social Democratic Party	1985–2002	
Sonia Karlsson			Social Democratic Party	1988–2010	
Torsten A. Karlsson			Social Democratic Party	1976–1991	
Kerstin Keen			People's Party	1985–1988	
Rolf Kenneryd			Centre Party	1985–1991; 1994–2002	
Ulf Kero			Social Democratic Party	1994–1998	
Reza Khelili Dylami			Moderate Party	2006–2010	
Marianne Kierkemann			Moderate Party	2006–2010	
Stefan Kihlberg			New Democracy	1991–1994	
Dan Kihlström			Christian Democrats	1998–2010	
Bengt Kindbom			Centre Party	1976–2002	
Bertil Kjellberg			Moderate Party	2002–2010	
Margareta Kjellin			Moderate Party	2006–2010	
Arne Kjörnsberg			Social Democratic Party	1985–2006	
Lena Klevenås			Social Democratic Party	1998–1998	
Peter Kling			New Democracy	1991–1994	
Maj-Inger Klingvall			Social Democratic Party	1988–2002	
Lennart Klockare			Social Democratic Party	1994–2006	
Helge Klöver			Social Democratic Party	1976–1988	
Göthe Knutson	1932–2010		Moderate Party	1976–1998	Värmland County
Inger Koch			Moderate Party	1982–1998	
Lennart Kollmats			Liberal People's Party	1998–2006	
Wiggo Komstedt			Moderate Party	1971–2002	
Bo Könberg			Liberal People's Party	1998–2006	
Anna König Jerlmyr			Moderate Party	2006–2014	
Ingemar Konradsson			Social Democratic Party	1973–1988	
Björn Körlof			Moderate Party	1979–1991	
Maria Kornevik Jakobsson			Centre Party	2006–2014	
Sture Korpås			Centre Party	1971–1985	
Ronny Korsberg			Green Party	1994–1998	
Tobias Krantz			Liberal People's Party	2002–2014	
Valter Kristenson			Social Democratic Party	1971–1985	
Astrid Kristensson			Moderate Party	1971–1979	
Axel Kristiansson			Centre Party	1971–1976	
Svante Kristiansson			Social Democratic Party	1971–1973	
Kerstin Kristiansson Karlstedt			Social Democratic Party	1994–2006	
Bengt Kronblad			Social Democratic Party	1982–1998	
Eric Krönmark		1931–	Moderate Party	1971–1982	Kalmar County
Kurt Kvarnström			Social Democratic Party	2002–2014	
Kenneth Kvist			Left Party	1994–2002	

== L ==
Representative	Lifespan	Profession	Party	Years	Constituency
Ann Mari Laag			Social Democratic Party	1973–1976	
Per Lager			Green Party	1994–2002	
Maria Lagergren			Social Democratic Party	1973–1976; 1979–1985	
Maj-Lis Landberg			Social Democratic Party	1973–1988	
Jarl Lander			Social Democratic Party	1988–1991; 1994–2006	
Henrik Landerholm			Moderate Party	1998–2002	
Per Landgren			Christian Democrats	1998–2006	
Gunnar Lange			Social Democratic Party	1971–1976	
Inga Lantz			Left Party-Communists	1973–1988	
Kenneth Lantz			Christian Democrats	1991–1994; 1998–2006	
Tage Larfors			Social Democratic Party	1971–1976	
Sofia Larsen			Centre Party	1998–2010	
Åke Larsson			Social Democratic Party	1971–1976	
Allan Larsson			Social Democratic Party	1998–2002	
Einar Larsson			Centre Party	1971–1985	
Erik Larsson			Centre Party	1971–1982	
Ewa Larsson			Green Party	1994–2002	
Gunnar Larsson			Centre Party	1971–1973	
Håkan Larsson			Centre Party	2002–2006	
Herbert Larsson			Social Democratic Party	1971–1973	
Kaj Larsson			Social Democratic Party	1985–2002	
Kalle Larsson			Left Party	1998–2010	
Lars Larsson i Lotorp			Social Democratic Party	1971–1973	
Lars-Åke Larsson			Social Democratic Party	1973–1985	
Lena Larsson			Social Democratic Party	1994–1998	
Maria Larsson			Christian Democrats	1998–2014	
Nina Larsson			Liberal People's Party	2006–2014	
Roland Larsson			Centre Party	1988–1998	
Roland Larsson			Social Democratic Party	1998–2002	
Sigvard Larsson			People's Party	1971–1973	
Thorsten Larsson			Centre Party	1971–1982	
Torgny Larsson			Social Democratic Party	1985–2002	
Frank Lassen			Social Democratic Party	1994–1998	
Helena Leander			Green Party	2006–2014	
Ingemar Leander			Social Democratic Party	1971–1979	
Roland Lében			Christian Democrats	1998–2002	
Hans Leghammar			Green Party	1988–1991	
Anna-Greta Leijon			Social Democratic Party	1973–1991	
Lars Leijonborg			People's Party	1985–2010	
Maria Leissner			People's Party	1985–1991	
Björn Leivik			Moderate Party	1998–2002; 2006–2014	
Britta Lejon			Social Democratic Party	2002–2006	
Sören Lekberg			Social Democratic Party	1982–2002	
Göran Lennmarker			Moderate Party	1998–2010	
Paul Lestander			Left Party-Communists	1982–1991	
Karl Leuchovius			Moderate Party	1971–1982	
Lennart Levi			Centre Party	2006–2010	
Karl Axel Levin			People's Party	1971–1973	
Anna-Lisa Lewén-Eliasson			Social Democratic Party	1971–1979	
Carl Lidbom			Social Democratic Party	1973–1982	
Bertil Lidgard			Moderate Party	1971–1985	
Lars Lilja			Social Democratic Party	1994–1998; 2002–2010	
Gunnel Liljegren			Moderate Party	1979–1988	
Désirée Liljevall			Social Democratic Party	2006–2014	
Anna Lilliehöök			Moderate Party	1998–2010	
Johan Linander			Centre Party	2002–2014	
Essen Lindahl			Social Democratic Party	1971–1982	
Torkel Lindahl			People's Party	1973–1982	
Arne Lindberg			Centre Party	1979–1982	
Camilla Lindberg			Liberal People's Party	2006–2010	
Marta Lindberg			Social Democratic Party	1971–1973	
Mats Lindberg			Social Democratic Party	1985–2002	
Sven Lindberg			Social Democratic Party	1971–1982	
Göran Lindblad			Moderate Party	1998–2010	
Gullan Lindblad			Moderate Party	1979–1998	
Hans Lindblad			People's Party	1976–1982; 1985–2002	
Lars Lindblad			Moderate Party	1998–2010	
Christer Lindblom			Liberal People's Party	1998–2002	
Göran Lindell			Centre Party	2010–2014	
Lars Lindén			Christian Democrats	2002–2010	
Rolf Lindén			Social Democratic Party	2002–2006	
Tanja Linderborg			Left Party	1994–2002	
Anna Lindgren			Moderate Party	2002–2006	
Else-Marie Lindgren			Christian Democrats	2002–2010	
Eva Selin Lindgren			Centre Party	2006–2010	
Jill Lindgren			Green Party	1988–1991	
Sylvia Lindgren			Social Democratic Party	1994–2010	
Ulrik Lindgren			Christian Democrats	2002–2006	
Anna Lindh	1957–2003		Social Democratic Party	1982–1985; 1998–2003	Södermanland County
Britt-Marie Lindkvist			Social Democratic Party	1998–2006	
Oskar Lindkvist			Social Democratic Party	1971–2002	
Inger Lindquist			Moderate Party	1973–1982	
Bengt Lindqvist			Social Democratic Party	1988–1991	
Ester Lindstedt-Staaf			Christian Democrats	1998–2002	
Olle Lindström			Moderate Party	1998–2002	
Ralf Lindström			Social Democratic Party	1973–1988	
Torsten Lindström			Christian Democrats	2002–2006	
Gudrun Lindvall			Green Party	1994–2002	
Elina Linna			Left Party	2002–2010	
Blenda Littmarck			Moderate Party	1979–1988	
Blenda Ljungberg			Moderate Party	1971–1973	
Bertil Löfberg			Social Democratic Party	1971–1976	
Emma Löfdahl Landberg			Liberal People's Party	2006–2010	
Pehr Löfgreen			Moderate Party	1998–2002	
Sigfrid Löfgren			People's Party	1971–1976	
Ulla Löfgren			Moderate Party	1994–1998; 2002–2010	
Malin Löfsjögård			Moderate Party	2006–2014	
Berit Löfstedt			Social Democratic Party	1982–1998	
Ulf Lönnqvist			Social Democratic Party	1985–2002	
Johan Lönnroth			Left Party	1998–2006	
Maj-Lis Lööw			Social Democratic Party	1979–2002	
Karla López			Green Party	2006–2010	
Gustav Lorentzon			Left Party-Communists	1971–1979	
Sven Eric Lorentzon			Moderate Party	1976–1991	
Carl-Wilhelm Lothigius			Moderate Party	1971–1979	
Lars-Erik Lövdén			Social Democratic Party	1979–2006	
Alf Lövenborg			Left Party-Communists	1973–1979	
Anne Ludvigsson			Social Democratic Party	2002–2010	
Ingrid Ludvigsson			Social Democratic Party	1971–1979	
Agneta Lundberg			Social Democratic Party	1994–2010	
Carin Lundberg			Social Democratic Party	1998–2006	
Inger Lundberg			Social Democratic Party	1998–2006	
John Lundberg			Social Democratic Party	1971–1973	
Sven Lundberg			Social Democratic Party	1982–1998	
Grethe Lundblad			Social Democratic Party	1971–1991	
Kajsa Lunderquist			Moderate Party	2010–2014	
Bo Lundgren			Moderate Party	1976–2006	
Kent Lundgren			Green Party	1988–1991	
Svante Lundkvist			Social Democratic Party	1971–1985	
Maria Lundqvist-Brömster			Liberal People's Party	2006–2014	
Nina Lundström			Liberal People's Party	2002–2006; 2010–2014	
Sten Lundström			Left Party	1998–2006	
Agneta Luttropp			Green Party	2010–2014	
Gösta Lyngå			Green Party	1988–1991	

== M ==
Representative	Lifespan	Profession	Party	Years	Constituency
Bertil Måbrink			Left Party-Communists	1971–2002	
Arne Magnusson			Centre Party	1971–1979	
Göran Magnusson			Social Democratic Party	1985–2006	
John Magnusson			Left Party-Communists	1971–1976	
Nils Magnusson			Social Democratic Party	1971–1976	
Tage Magnusson			Moderate Party	1971–1979	
Louise Malmström			Social Democratic Party	2002–2014	
Ragnwi Marcelind			Christian Democrats	1998–2006	
Eric Marcusson			Social Democratic Party	1971–1979	
Eivor Marklund			Left Party-Communists	1971–1982	
Leif Marklund			Social Democratic Party	1985–1998	
Elisebeht Markström			Social Democratic Party	1994–2010	
Alvar Mårtensson			Social Democratic Party	1971–1973	
Ingela Mårtensson			People's Party	1985–2002	
Iris Mårtensson			Social Democratic Party	1976–1991	
Jerry Martinger			Moderate Party	1985–2002	
Bo Martinsson			Social Democratic Party	1971–1973	
Karl-Gustaf Mathsson			Social Democratic Party	1979–1985	
Lisa Mattson			Social Democratic Party	1971–1985	
Kjell A. Mattsson			Centre Party	1971–1985	
Lennart Mattsson			Centre Party	1971–1976	
Ulf Melin			Moderate Party	1988–1991; 1994–1998	
Arne Mellqvist			Social Democratic Party	1988–1991	
Sven Mellqvist			Social Democratic Party	1971–1979	
Ulrica Messing			Social Democratic Party	1998–2010	
Maggi Mikaelsson			Left Party-Communists	1988–1991; 1994–2002	
Carina Moberg			Social Democratic Party	1994–2014	
Sven Moberg			Social Democratic Party	1971–1976	
Anita Modin			Social Democratic Party	1982–2002	
Britt Mogård			Moderate Party	1971–1982	
Per-Richard Molén			Moderate Party	1982–1988; 1991–1994; 1998–2002	
Björn Molin			People's Party	1971–1985	
Birger Möller			People's Party	1971–1973	
Ewy Möller			Moderate Party	1982–1991	
Yngve Möller			Social Democratic Party	1971–1973	
Max Montalvo			New Democracy	1991–1994	
Göran Montan			Moderate Party	2006–2014	
Lars Moquist			New Democracy	1991–1994	
Margareta Mörck			People's Party	1985–1988	
Holger Mossberg			Social Democratic Party	1971–1979	
Erik Mossberger			Social Democratic Party	1971–1973	
Ingemar Mundebo			People's Party	1971–1982	
Sven Munke			Moderate Party	1979–1988	
Johnny Munkhammar	1974–2012	writer	Moderate Party	2010–2012	Stockholm County

== N ==
Representative	Lifespan	Profession	Party	Years	Constituency
Ana Maria Narti			Liberal People's Party	2002–2006	
Ingrid Näslund			Christian Democrats	1998–2002	
Eric Nelander			People's Party	1971–1973	
Cecilia Nettelbrandt			People's Party	1971–1976	
Thomas Nihlén			Green Party	2006–2010	
Rolf L. Nilson			Left Party-Communists	1988–2002	
Anders Nilsson			Social Democratic Party	1982–1998	
Anna-Lisa Nilsson			Centre Party	1971–1979	
Annika Nilsson			Social Democratic Party	1994–2006	
Barbro Nilsson			Social Democratic Party	1982–1985	
Barbro Nilsson			Moderate Party	1982–1988	
Bernt Nilsson			Social Democratic Party	1971–1982	
Birger Nilsson			Social Democratic Party	1971–1979	
Bo Nilsson			Social Democratic Party	1982–1998	
Börje Nilsson			Social Democratic Party	1973–1998	
Carl G. Nilsson			Moderate Party	1988–2002	
Christer Nilsson			Social Democratic Party	1973–1988	
Christin Nilsson			Social Democratic Party	1994–1998	
Elvy Nilsson			Social Democratic Party	1971–1985	
Gunnar Nilsson			Social Democratic Party	1976–2002	
Gunnar Nilsson			Social Democratic Party	1982–1985	
Gustav Nilsson			Moderate Party	2006–2014	
Helena Nilsson			Centre Party	1994–1998	
Jan-Ivan Nilsson			Centre Party	1971–1979	
Kaj Nilsson			Green Party	1988–1991	
Karin Nilsson			Centre Party	2006–2014	
Kerstin Nilsson			Social Democratic Party	1976–1985	
Kjell Nilsson			Social Democratic Party	1971–2002	
Lennart Nilsson			Social Democratic Party	1976–2006	
Martin Nilsson			Social Democratic Party	1994–2006	
Mats G. Nilsson			Moderate Party	2006–2010	
Nils Oskar Nilsson			Moderate Party	2006–2010	
Per-Axel Nilsson			Social Democratic Party	1973–1985	
Rolf K. Nilsson			Moderate Party	2006–2010	
Tore Nilsson			Moderate Party	1971–1985	
Torsten Nilsson			Social Democratic Party	1971–1976	
Ulf Nilsson			Liberal People's Party	1998–2014	
Ulrik Nilsson			Moderate Party	2010–2014	
Yngve Nilsson			Moderate Party	1971–1976	
Per-Erik Nisser			Moderate Party	1971–1979	
Per-Samuel Nisser			Moderate Party	1998–2002	
Elise Norberg			Left Party	1998–2002	
Gudrun Norberg			People's Party	1985–2002	
Lars Norberg			Green Party	1988–1991	
Ivar Nordberg			Social Democratic Party	1971–1991	
Marie Nordén			Social Democratic Party	2002–2014	
Margareta E. Nordenvall			Moderate Party	1994–1998	
Hans Nordgren			Moderate Party	1971–1976	
Annika Nordgren Christensen			Green Party	1994–1998	
Nils Nordh			Social Democratic Party	1982–2002	
Sten Nordin			Moderate Party	2006–2010	
Sven Erik Nordin			Centre Party	1973–1985	
Inger Nordlander			Social Democratic Party	2002–2006	
Karin Nordlander			Left Party-Communists	1971–1982	
Harald Nordlund			Liberal People's Party	1998–2002	
Gunnar Nordmark			Liberal People's Party	2002–2006	
Kaj Nordquist			Social Democratic Party	2002–2006	
Kew Nordqvist			Green Party	2010–2014	
Ove Nordstrandh			Moderate Party	1971–1979	
Charlotte Nordström			Moderate Party	2006–2010	
Kjell Nordström			Social Democratic Party	1985–1991; 1994–2006	
Kristina Nordström			Social Democratic Party	1994–1998	
Patrik Norinder			Moderate Party	1998–2006	
Göran Norlander			Social Democratic Party	1998–2006	
Liza-Maria Norlin			Christian Democrats	2006–2010	
Bengt Norling			Social Democratic Party	1971–1979	
Hagar Normark			Social Democratic Party	1971–1985	
Karl-Eric Norrby			Centre Party	1971–1982	
Sören Norrby			People's Party	1971–1973	
Edip Noyan			Moderate Party	2010–2014	
Pär Nuder			Social Democratic Party	1994–2010	
Sven-Åke Nygårds			Social Democratic Party	1988–1991; 1994–1998	
Arne Nygren			Social Democratic Party	1971–1985	
Ing-Britt Nygren			Moderate Party	1988–1991	
Hans Nyhage			Moderate Party	1973–2002	
Yngve Nyquist			Social Democratic Party	1976–1985	
Ola Nyqvist			People's Party	1973–1976	
Elizabeth Nyström			Moderate Party	1994–2006	

== O ==
Representative	Lifespan	Profession	Party	Years	Constituency
Maria Öberg			Social Democratic Party	2002–2010	
Marta Obminska			Moderate Party	2010–2014	
Mats Odell			Christian Democrats	1998–2014	
Margit Odelsparr			Centre Party	1976–1979	
Mikael Odenberg			Moderate Party	1998–2010	
Maja Ohlin			Social Democratic Party	1973–1976; 1979–1982	
Lars Ohly			Left Party	1998–2014	
Conny Öhman			Social Democratic Party	1994–2006	
Monica Öhman			Social Democratic Party	1985–2002	
Oskar Öholm			Moderate Party	2006–2014	
Lena Öhrsvik			Social Democratic Party	1976–2002	
Bertil Öhvall			People's Party	1971–1973	
Ronny Olander			Social Democratic Party	1994–2010	
Britt Olauson			Social Democratic Party	2002–2006	
Sven-Göran Olhede			Social Democratic Party	1971–1973	
Joakim Ollén			Moderate Party	1976–1982	
Eva Olofsson			Left Party	2006–2014	
Maud Olofsson			Centre Party	2002–2014	
Alma Olsson			Centre Party	1971–1976	
Billy Olsson			People's Party	1971–1973	
Elvy Olsson			Centre Party	1971–1982	
Erik Olsson			Moderate Party	1982–1985	
Gunnar Olsson			Social Democratic Party	1973–1985	
Hans Olsson			Social Democratic Party	2006–2014	
Johan A. Olsson			Centre Party	1973–1982	
Karin Olsson			Social Democratic Party	1994–1998	
Karl Erik Olsson			Centre Party	1976–1979; 1985–1994	
Kent Olsson			Moderate Party	1998–2010	
Leif Olsson			People's Party	1985–1991	
Lena Olsson			Left Party	1998–2002; 2006–2014	
LiseLotte Olsson			Left Party	2006–2010	
Martin Olsson			Social Democratic Party	1971–1973	
Martin Olsson			Centre Party	1973–1991	
Mats Olsson			Social Democratic Party	1971–1976; 1982–1985	
Rolf Olsson			Left Party	1998–2006	
Stig Olsson			Social Democratic Party	1971–1985	
Sune Olsson			Left Party-Communists	1971–1976	
Ulla Orring			People's Party	1985–2002	
Berit Oscarsson			Social Democratic Party	1982–1998	
Yvonne Oscarsson			Left Party	1998–2002	
Christina Oskarsson			Social Democratic Party	1998–2014	
Gunnar Oskarsson			Moderate Party	1971–1982	
Ingegärd Oskarsson			Centre Party	1973–1982	
Irene Oskarsson			Christian Democrats	2006–2014	
Sven-Erik Österberg			Social Democratic Party	1994–2014	
Rosa Östh			Centre Party	1982–2002	
Sten Östlund			Social Democratic Party	1982–1998	
Olle Östrand			Social Democratic Party	1973–1991	
Thomas Östros			Social Democratic Party	1994–2014	
Roy Ottosson			Green Party	1988–1991; 1994–1998	
Sermin Özürküt			Left Party	2002–2006	

== P ==
Representative	Lifespan	Profession	Party	Years	Constituency
Leif Pagrotsky	1951–		Social Democratic Party	2002–2012	City of Gothenburg
Sture Palm			Social Democratic Party	1971–1985	
Sverre Palm			Social Democratic Party	1985–1998	
Olof Palme	1927–1986	minister	Social Democratic Party	1971–1986	City of Stockholm
Barbro Palmerlund			Social Democratic Party	1998–2002	
Margareta Palmqvist			Social Democratic Party	1979–1988	
Anne-Marie Pålsson			Moderate Party	2002–2010	
Margareta Pålsson			Moderate Party	2002–2014	
Chatrine Pålsson Ahlgren			Christian Democrats	1998–2010	
Nikos Papadopoulos			Social Democratic Party	1994–1998; 2002–2010	
Sten Sture Paterson			Moderate Party	1979–1985	
Runar Patriksson			Liberal People's Party	1998–2006	
Peter Pedersen			Left Party	1998–2010	
Maj Pehrsson			Centre Party	1971–1982	
Nalin Pekgul			Social Democratic Party	1994–2002	
Åke Persson			People's Party	1979–1982	
Anita Persson			Social Democratic Party	1979–1998	
Arne Persson			Centre Party	1971–1979	
Bertil Persson			Moderate Party	1988–2002	
Carl Olov Persson			Christian Democrats	1998–2002	
Catherine Persson			Social Democratic Party	1994–2010	
Elisabeth Persson			Left Party-Communists	1988–2002	
Göran Persson	1949–	minister	Social Democratic Party	1979–1985; 1991–2007	Södermanland County
Göran Persson i Simrishamn			Social Democratic Party	2002–2010	
Gustav Persson			Social Democratic Party	1982–1991	
Jörgen Persson			Social Democratic Party	1994–1998	
Karl-Erik Persson			Left Party-Communists	1985–1998	
Kent Persson			Left Party	2006–2014	
Leo Persson			Social Democratic Party	1988–1998	
Magnus Persson			Social Democratic Party	1971–2002	
Margareta Persson			Social Democratic Party	1998–2010	
My Persson			Moderate Party	1998–1998	
Sigvard Persson			Centre Party	1982–1985	
Siw Persson			People's Party	1985–2002	
Sven Persson			Social Democratic Party	1971–1973	
Sven Gunnar Persson			Christian Democrats	2002–2010	
Sven Yngve Persson			Moderate Party	2006–2010	
Yngve Persson			Social Democratic Party	1971–1973	
Eva Persson Sellin			Social Democratic Party	1994–1998	
Mats Pertoft			Green Party	2006–2014	
Bertil Peterson			Social Democratic Party	1971–1976	
Göte Peterson			Social Democratic Party	1971–1973	
Thage G. Peterson			Social Democratic Party	1971–1998	
Hans Petersson			People's Party	1971–1988	
Hans Petersson			Left Party-Communists	1979–1991	
Karl-Anders Petersson			Centre Party	1973–1979; 1985–1988	
Per Petersson			Moderate Party	1971–1985	
Sven-Olof Petersson			Centre Party	1988–2002	
Alf Pettersson			Social Democratic Party	1971–1976	
Arne Pettersson			Social Democratic Party	1971–1979	
Christina Pettersson			Social Democratic Party	1994–1998	
Georg Pettersson			Social Democratic Party	1971–1973	
Georg Pettersson			Centre Party	1971–1979	
Hans Pettersson			Social Democratic Party	1973–1988	
Harald Pettersson			Centre Party	1971–1976	
Lennart Pettersson			Social Democratic Party	1971–1991	
Lennart Pettersson			Centre Party	2006–2010	
Marina Pettersson			Social Democratic Party	1994–2010	
Rune Pettersson			Left Party-Communists	1973–1976	
Sixten Pettersson			Moderate Party	1979–1982	
Sylvia Pettersson			Social Democratic Party	1985–1991	
Ulla Pettersson			Social Democratic Party	1985–2002	
William Petzäll	1988–2012		Sweden Democrats independent	2010–2012	Dalarna County
Karin Pilsäter			Liberal People's Party	1994–2010	
Ragnhild Pohanka			Green Party	1988–1991; 1994–1998	
Åke Polstam			Centre Party	1971–1982	
Bruno Poromaa	1936–2016		Social Democratic Party	1982–1994	
Marietta de Pourbaix-Lundin			Moderate Party	1994–2014	
Jan Prytz			Moderate Party	1979–1982	

== R ==
Representative	Lifespan	Profession	Party	Years	Constituency
Peter Rådberg			Green Party	2006–2014	
Wivi-Anne Radesjö			Social Democratic Party	1973–1988	
Jan-Evert Rådhström			Moderate Party	1998–2014	
Britta Rådström			Social Democratic Party	2002–2010	
Lage Rahm			Green Party	2006–2010	
Rolf Rämgård			Centre Party	1973–1985	
Gunde Raneskog			Centre Party	1973–1979	
Karl Rask			Social Democratic Party	1971–1976	
Ola Rask			Social Democratic Party	1994–2006	
Carl Göran Regnéll			Moderate Party	1971–1976	
Fredrik Reinfeldt	1965–	prime minister, civilekonom	Moderate Party	1991–2014	
Eric Rejdnell			People's Party	1976–1982	
Sonja Rembo			Moderate Party	1979–1998	
Inger René			Moderate Party	1998–2010	
Claes Rensfeldt			Social Democratic Party	1985–1988	
Yoomi Renström			Social Democratic Party	2002–2006	
Anne Rhenman			New Democracy	1991–1994	
Gunnar Richardson			People's Party	1971–1973; 1976–1979	
Göran Riegnell			Moderate Party	1982–1985	
Sigvard Rimås			People's Party	1971–1973	
Stig Rindborg			Moderate Party	1998–2002	
Per-Eric Ringaby			Moderate Party	1971–1979	
Bosse Ringholm			Social Democratic Party	2002–2010	
Agneta Ringman			Social Democratic Party	1994–2006	
Jonas Ringqvist			Left Party	1998–2002	
Henrik Ripa			Moderate Party	2010–2014	
Helena Rivière			Moderate Party	2006–2010	
Fanny Rizell			Christian Democrats	1998–2002	
Christina Rogestam			Centre Party	1973–1982	
Lennart Rohdin			Liberal People's Party	1994–1998	
Mauricio Rojas			Liberal People's Party	2002–2006	
Gabriel Romanus			People's Party	1971–1982; 2002–2006	
Ingrid Ronne-Björkqvist			People's Party	1985–1991	
Catarina Rönnung			Social Democratic Party	1976–1998	
Bengt Rosén			People's Party	1985–2002	
Mikael Rosén			Moderate Party	2006–2010	
Björn Rosengren			Social Democratic Party	2002–2006	
Hans Rosengren			Social Democratic Party	1985–1991	
Per Rosengren			Left Party	1994–2006	
Eliza Roszkowska Öberg			Moderate Party	2006–2014	
Carl-Axel Roslund			Moderate Party	2002–2006	
Birger Rosqvist			Social Democratic Party	1971–2002	
Claes Roxbergh			Green Party	1988–1991; 2002–2006	
Liisa Rulander			Christian Democrats	1998–2002	
Rosita Runegrund			Christian Democrats	1998–2010	
Carin Runeson			Social Democratic Party	2006–2014	
Yvonne Ruwaida			Green Party	1994–2006	
Eva Rydén			Centre Party	1985–1988	
Rune Rydén			People's Party	1971–1973	
Rune Rydén			Moderate Party	1976–1998	
Gunvor Ryding			Left Party-Communists	1971–1976	
Birgitta Rydle			Moderate Party	1979–1991	
Bengt-Ola Ryttar			Social Democratic Party	1985–2002	

== S ==
Representative	Lifespan	Profession	Party	Years	Constituency
Ingegerd Saarinen			Green Party	2002–2006	
Nyamko Sabuni			Liberal People's Party	2002–2006; 2010–2014	
Ameer Sachet			Social Democratic Party	2002–2010	
Lennart Sacrédeus			Christian Democrats	2006–2010	
Pär Axel Sahlberg	1954–	vicar	Social Democratic Party	1994–2006	Halland County
Mona Sahlin			Social Democratic Party	1982–1994; 2002–2014	
Ingegerd Sahlström			Social Democratic Party	1988–2002	
Mona Saint Cyr			Moderate Party	1979–2002	
Björn Samuelson			Left Party-Communists	1982–2002	
Björn Samuelson			Moderate Party	2010–2014	
Marianne Samuelsson			Green Party	1988–1991; 1994–2002	
Ulla Samuelsson			Social Democratic Party	1988–1991	
Olle Sandahl			Christian Democrats	2002–2006	
Barbro Sandberg			People's Party	1985–1991	
Gunnar Sandberg			Social Democratic Party	2002–2014	
Jan Sandberg			Moderate Party	1985–2002	
Yvonne Sandberg-Fries			Social Democratic Party	1982–2002	
Margit Sandéhn			Social Democratic Party	1976–1991	
Viola Sandell			Social Democratic Party	1971–1976	
Mats Sander			Moderate Party	2006–2010	
Margareta Sandgren			Social Democratic Party	1994–1998	
Lena Sandlin-Hedman			Social Democratic Party	1994–2006	
Åke Sandström			Centre Party	1998–2002; 2006–2010	
Mikael Sandström			Moderate Party	2006–2014	
Stig Sandström			Left Party	1994–2002	
Anneli Särnblad			Social Democratic Party	2002–2010	
Birger Schlaug			Green Party	1994–2002	
Olle Schmidt			Liberal People's Party	1998–2002	
Pierre Schori			Social Democratic Party	1998–2002	
Inger Schörling			Green Party	1988–1991	
Lars Schött			Moderate Party	1971–1979	
Magdalena Schröder			Moderate Party	2018–2022	
Fredrik Schulte			Moderate Party	2006–2014	
Gudrun Schyman			Left Party-Communists independent	1988–2006	
Inger Segelström			Social Democratic Party	1994–2006	
Martin Segerstedt			Social Democratic Party	1976–1991	
Ingrid Segerström			Social Democratic Party	1979–1982	
Åke Selberg			Social Democratic Party	1985–2002	
Birgitta Sellén			Centre Party	1998–2010	
Rolf Sellgren			People's Party	1971–1982	
Anders Sellström			Christian Democrats	2010–2014	
Mariam Osman Sherifay			Social Democratic Party	2002–2006	
Anita Sidén			Moderate Party	1998–2006	
Bo Siegbahn			Moderate Party	1973–1982	
Karl Sigfrid			Moderate Party	2006–2014	
Sven-Gösta Signell			Social Democratic Party	1971–2002	
Ingibjörg Sigurdsdóttir			Social Democratic Party	1994–1998	
Gertrud Sigurdsen			Social Democratic Party	1971–1991	
Bengt Silfverstrand			Social Democratic Party	1976–2002	
Magnus Sjödahl			Christian Democrats	2010–2014	
Karl Gustaf Sjödin			New Democracy	1991–1994	
Sten Sjöholm			People's Party	1971–1976	
Anders Sjölund			Moderate Party	1998–2002	
Bengt Sjönell			Centre Party	1971–1979	
Ulf Sjösten			Moderate Party	2002–2010	
Sven-Erik Sjöstrand			Left Party	1998–2006	
Anna-Greta Skantz			Social Democratic Party	1971–1982	
Carl-Erik Skårman			Moderate Party	1998–2006	
Kenth Skårvik			People's Party	1982–2002	
Ingrid Skeppstedt			Centre Party	1994–1998	
Camilla Sköld Jansson			Left Party	1998–2006	
Berndt Sköldestig	1944–2006		Social Democratic Party	1994–2006	
Christer Skoog			Social Democratic Party	1988–2006	
Karin Söder			Centre Party	1971–1991	
Sten Söderberg			New Democracy	1991–1994	
Willy Söderdahl			Left Party	1998–2002	
Nils-Erik Söderqvist			Social Democratic Party	1994–2006	
Oswald Söderqvist			Left Party-Communists	1976–1988	
Bo Södersten			Social Democratic Party	1979–1988	
Elvy Söderström			Social Democratic Party	1998–2002	
Kurt Söderström			Moderate Party	1971–1979	
Lena Sommestad			Social Democratic Party	2010–2014	
Lars-Ingvar Sörenson			Social Democratic Party	1973–1985	
Birthe Sörestedt			Social Democratic Party	1982–1998	
Harry Staaf			Christian Democrats	1998–2002	
August Spångberg			Social Democratic Party	1922–1964	Värmland County
Lisbeth Staaf-Igelström			Social Democratic Party	1998–2002	
Otto Stadling			Social Democratic Party	1971–1976	
Tasso Stafilidis			Left Party	1998–2006	
Marianne Stålberg			Social Democratic Party	1976–1991	
Bert Stålhammar			People's Party	1971–1973	
Kerstin-Maria Stalín			Green Party	1998–2006	
Karin Starrin			Centre Party	1988–1991; 1994–1998	
Anna Steele			Liberal People's Party	2010–2014	
Anita Stenberg			Green Party	1988–1991	
Åsa Stenberg			Social Democratic Party	1994–1998	
Hans Stenberg			Social Democratic Party	1998–2010	
Maria Stenberg			Social Democratic Party	2010–2014	
Per Stenmarck			Moderate Party	1979–2002	
Rigmor Stenmark			Centre Party	1998–2006	
Börje Stensson			People's Party	1976–1988	
Gösta Sterne			People's Party	1971–1973	
Lars Stjernkvist			Social Democratic Party	1998–1998	
Håkan Stjernlöf			Moderate Party	1982–1988	
Michael Stjernström			Christian Democrats	1994–1998	
Per Stjernström			Centre Party	1971–1979	
Claes Stockhaus			Left Party	1998–2002	
Torkild Strandberg			Liberal People's Party	2002–2014	
Gunnar Sträng			Social Democratic Party	1971–1985	
Magdalena Streijffert			Social Democratic Party	2006–2010	
Torsten Stridsman			Centre Party	1971–1979	
Per-Olof Strindberg			Moderate Party	1971–1988	
Gunnar Ström			Social Democratic Party	1982–1988	
Ola Ström			Liberal People's Party	1994–1998	
Håkan Strömberg			Social Democratic Party	1973–1998	
Karl-Erik Strömberg			People's Party	1971–1979	
Inger Strömbom			Christian Democrats	1998–2002	
Jan Strömdahl			Left Party-Communists	1988–1991	
Ingrid Sundberg			Moderate Party	1971–1991	
Bernhard Sundelin			Social Democratic Party	1971–1976	
Ola Sundell			Moderate Party	1994–2010	
Roland Sundgren			Social Democratic Party	1971–2002	
Britta Sundin			Social Democratic Party	1985–1998	
Lars Sundin			People's Party	1985–2002	
Tage Sundkvist			Centre Party	1971–1985	
Per Olof Sundman	1922–1992	author	Centre Party	1971–1979	Stockholm County
Åke Sundqvist			Moderate Party	1994–1998	
Anders Sundström			Social Democratic Party	1998–2006	
Gudrun Sundström			Social Democratic Party	1971–1982	
Sten-Ove Sundström			Social Democratic Party	1979–2002	
Ingvar Svanberg			Social Democratic Party	1971–1982	
Ivan Svanström			Centre Party	1971–1982	
Anders Svärd			Centre Party	1982–1985; 1988–1998	
Karl-Erik Svartberg			Social Democratic Party	1976–2002	
Erik Svedberg			Social Democratic Party	1971–1973	
Per Svedberg			Social Democratic Party	2006–2014	
Lars Svensk			Christian Democrats	1998–2002	
Karl-Gösta Svenson			Moderate Party	1988–1998	
Alf Svensson			Centre Party; Christian Democrats	1985–1988; 1991–2010	
Arne Svensson			Moderate Party	1979–1988	
Evert Svensson			Social Democratic Party	1971–1991	
Ingvar Svensson			Christian Democrats	1998–2010	
Jörn Svensson			Left Party-Communists	1971–1988	
Kristina Svensson			Social Democratic Party	1985–2002	
Lars Svensson			Social Democratic Party	1979–1991	
Nils T. Svensson			Social Democratic Party	1982–1998	
Olle Svensson			Social Democratic Party	1971–1991	
Per-Olof Svensson			Social Democratic Party	1998–2006	
Sten Svensson			Moderate Party	1976–1998	
Kersti Swartz			People's Party	1973–1982	
Henrik von Sydow			Moderate Party	2002–2014	

== T ==
Representative	Lifespan	Profession	Party	Years	Constituency
John Takman			Left Party-Communists	1971–1976	
Daniel Tarschys			People's Party	1976–1979; 1985–1994	
Magnus Taube			People's Party	1971–1973	
Anna Tenje			Moderate Party	2006–2010	
Tommy Ternemar			Social Democratic Party	2002–2010	
Solveig Ternström			Centre Party	2006–2010	
Rezene Tesfazion			Social Democratic Party	2002–2006	
Ingela Thalén			Social Democratic Party	1988–2006	
Maj Britt Theorin			Social Democratic Party	1971–1995	
Göran Thingwall			Moderate Party	2006–2010	
Gunnar Thollander			Social Democratic Party	1982–2002	
Karin Thorborg			Left Party	2002–2006	
Rune Thorén			Centre Party	1985–2002	
Sverker Thorén			Liberal People's Party	2002–2006	
Lennart Thörnlund			Social Democratic Party	1994–1998	
Inga Thorsson			Social Democratic Party	1971–1979	
Sture Thun			Social Democratic Party	1979–1991	
Gunbjörg Thunvall			Social Democratic Party	1971–1976	
Görel Thurdin			Centre Party	1985–1998	
Roger Tiefensee			Centre Party	2002–2014	
Ulla Tillander			Centre Party	1973–1991	
Tone Tingsgård			Social Democratic Party	1994–1998; 2002–2010	
Gunilla Tjernberg			Christian Democrats	1998–2010	
Erik Tobé			People's Party	1971–1973	
Lars Tobisson			Moderate Party	1979–2002	
Sten Tolgfors			Moderate Party	1994–2014	
Stefan Tornberg			Centre Party	2006–2010	
Åsa Torstensson			Centre Party	1998–2014	
Rune Torwald			Centre Party	1971–1985	
Sven-Olov Träff			Moderate Party	1973–1979	
Ingegerd Troedsson			Moderate Party	1973–2002	
Bo Turesson			Moderate Party	1971–1979	

== U ==
Representative	Lifespan	Profession	Party	Years	Constituency
Bertil af Ugglas			Moderate Party	1973–1979	
Margaretha af Ugglas			Moderate Party	1973–2002	
Lars Ulander			Social Democratic Party	1979–1991	
Richard Ulfvengren			New Democracy	1991–1994	
Jörgen Ullenhag			People's Party	1976–1985	
Ola Ullsten			People's Party	1971–1973; 1976–1985	
Marita Ulvskog			Social Democratic Party	1998–2010	
Per Unckel			Moderate Party	1976–1985; 1994–2006	
Ines Uusmann			Social Democratic Party	1998–1998	

== V ==
Representative	Lifespan	Profession	Party	Years	Constituency
Paavo Vallius			Social Democratic Party	1994–1998; 2002–2006	
Mikaela Valtersson			Green Party	2002–2014	
Ingemar Vänerlöv			Christian Democrats	1998–2010	
Lennart Värmby			Left Party	1998–2002	
Claes Västerteg			Centre Party	2002–2010	
Iréne Vestlund			Social Democratic Party	1982–1998	
Ivar Virgin			Moderate Party	1971–1976	
Ivar Virgin			Moderate Party	1982–2002	
Jan-Eric Virgin			Moderate Party	1982–1985	
Lilian Virgin			Social Democratic Party	1994–2006	

== W ==
Representative	Lifespan	Profession	Party	Years	Constituency
Nils Erik Wååg			Social Democratic Party	1971–1988	
Abdirizak Waberi			Moderate Party	2010–2014	
Hans Wachtmeister			Moderate Party	1973–1988	
Ian Wachtmeister	1932–	engineer, industrialist	New Democracy	1991–1994	Örebro County
Knut Wachtmeister			Moderate Party	1973–2002	
Peder Wachtmeister			Moderate Party	2006–2014	
Liselotte Wågö			Moderate Party	1998–2002	
Marianne Wahlberg			People's Party	1979–1982	
Gunilla Wahlén			Left Party	1998–2010	
Marie Wahlgren			Liberal People's Party	2002–2006	
Rosa-Lill Wåhlstedt			Social Democratic Party	1988–1991	
Göte Wahlström			Social Democratic Party	1998–2010	
Tommy Waidelich			Social Democratic Party	1998–2014	
Erling Wälivaara			Christian Democrats	1998–2006	
Maj-Britt Wallhorn			Christian Democrats	1998–2002	
Gunnel Wallin			Centre Party	1998–2002; 2006–2010	
Margot Wallström			Social Democratic Party	1979–1985	
Erik Wärnberg			Social Democratic Party	1971–1982	
Kerstin Warnerbring			Centre Party	1994–1998	
Ingegerd Wärnersson			Social Democratic Party	1988–1991; 1994–2002	
Meeri Wasberg			Social Democratic Party	2010–2014	
Olle Wästberg			People's Party	1979–1982	
Marianne Watz			Moderate Party	2006–2010	
Sven Wedén			People's Party	1971–1973	
Lars Wegendal			Social Democratic Party	1998–2010	
Karin Wegestål			Social Democratic Party	1988–2002	
Peter Weibull Bernström			Moderate Party	1994–1998	
Marie Weibull Kornias			Moderate Party	2006–2010	
Kjell-Arne Welin			People's Party	1985–1991	
Linda Wemmert			Moderate Party	2010–2014	
Alf Wennerfors			Moderate Party	1971–2002	
Alwa Wennerlund			Christian Democrats	1998–2002	
Lars Werner			Left Party-Communists	1971–2002	
Mårten Werner			Moderate Party	1971–1976; 1979–1982	
H. G. Wessberg			Moderate Party	2010–2014	
Olle Westberg			People's Party	1971–1976	
Olle Westberg			Social Democratic Party	1971–1988	
Ulla Wester			Social Democratic Party	1998–2006	
Ulla Wester-Rudin			Social Democratic Party	1994–1998	
Bengt Westerberg			People's Party	1985–2002	
Per Westerberg			Moderate Party	1979–2014	
Majléne Westerlund Panke			Social Democratic Party	1994–2006	
Aina Westin			Social Democratic Party	1982–1991	
Henrik Westman			Moderate Party	1998–2006	
Maria Wetterstrand			Green Party	2002–2014	
Anne Wibble			People's Party	1985–1998	
Sören Wibe			Social Democratic Party	2002–2006	
Birgitta Wichne			Moderate Party	1994–1998	
Krister Wickman			Social Democratic Party	1971–1976	
Inger Wickzén			Moderate Party	1982–1985	
Åke Wictorsson			Social Democratic Party	1971–1982	
Monica Widnemark			Social Democratic Party	1998–1998	
Jon Peter Wieselgren			New Democracy	1991–1994	
Britt Wigenfeldt			Centre Party	1973–1979	
Cecilia Wigström			Liberal People's Party	2002–2010	
Anders Wijkman			Moderate Party	1971–1979	
Anders Wiklund			Left Party	2002–2006	
Bengt Wiklund			Social Democratic Party	1971–1985	
Daniel Wiklund			People's Party	1971–1973	
Pontus Wiklund			Christian Democrats	1998–2002	
Svea Wiklund			Centre Party	1973–1979	
Valfrid Wikner			Social Democratic Party	1971–1976	
Cecilia Wikström			Liberal People's Party	2002–2010	
Jan-Erik Wikström			People's Party	1971–1973; 1976–2002	
Rune Wikström			Moderate Party	2006–2014	
Marie Wilén			Centre Party	1994–1998	
Carl-Johan Wilson			People's Party	1985–1998	
Christer Winbäck			Liberal People's Party	2002–2014	
Håkan Winberg			Moderate Party	1971–1982	
Margareta Winberg			Social Democratic Party	1982–2006	
Christer Windén			New Democracy	1991–1994	
Eva Winther			People's Party	1976–1982	
David Wirmark			People's Party	1971–1973	
Rolf Wirtén			People's Party	1971–1982	
Carlinge Wisberg			Left Party	1998–2002	
Birgitta Wistrand			Moderate Party	1998–2002	
Bengt Wittbom			Moderate Party	1979–1988; 1991–1994	
Siw Wittgren-Ahl			Social Democratic Party	1994–2010	
Anna Wohlin-Andersson			Centre Party	1982–1991	

== Y ==
Representative	Lifespan	Profession	Party	Years	Constituency
Maryam Yazdanfar			Social Democratic Party	2002–2014	
Mariann Ytterberg			Social Democratic Party	1994–2006	

== Z ==
Representative	Lifespan	Profession	Party	Years	Constituency
Claus Zaar			New Democracy	1991–1994	
Bertil Zachrisson			Social Democratic Party	1971–1982	
Kristina Zakrisson			Social Democratic Party	1994–1998; 2002–2010	
Christina Zedell			Social Democratic Party	2006–2014	
Pernilla Zethraeus			Left Party	2006–2010	
Eva Zetterberg			Left Party	1998–2002	
Hanna Zetterberg			Left Party	1994–1998	
