= List of members of the Riksdag, 2002–2006 =

This is a list of members of the Riksdag, the national parliament of Sweden. The Riksdag is a unicameral assembly with 349 members of parliament (Swedish: riksdagsledamöter), who are elected on a proportional basis to serve fixed terms of four years. In the Riksdag, members are seated per constituency and not party. The following MPs were elected in the 2002 Swedish general election and served until the 2006 Swedish general election. Members of the social democratic Cabinet of Göran Persson, the ruling party during this term, are marked in bold, party leaders of the seven parties represented in the Riksdag in italic.

Party colors	Seats	Party leader
Social Democratic Party	144	Göran Persson (1996–2007)
Moderate Party	55	Bo Lundgren (1999–2003); Fredrik Reinfeldt (2003–present)
Liberal People's Party	48	Lars Leijonborg (1997–2007)
Christian Democrats	33	Alf Svensson (1973–2004); Göran Hägglund (2004–present)
Left Party	29	Gudrun Schyman (1993–2003); Ulla Hoffmann (acting) (2003–2004); Lars Ohly (2004–present)
Centre Party	22	Maud Olofsson (2001–present)
Green Party	17	Peter Eriksson (2002–present); Maria Wetterstrand (2002–present)

== List ==
Seat	Name	Party	Constituency
1	Carl-Erik Skårman	Moderate Party	Stockholm Municipality
2	Gabriel Romanus	Liberal People's Party	Stockholm Municipality
3	Mikael Odenberg	Moderate Party	Stockholm Municipality
4	Henrik S. Järrel	Moderate Party	Stockholm Municipality
5	Sylvia Lindgren	Social Democratic Party	Stockholm Municipality
6	Beatrice Ask	Moderate Party	Stockholm Municipality
7	Ulla Hoffmann	Left Party	Stockholm Municipality
8	Inger Nordlander	Social Democratic Party	Stockholm Municipality
9	Yvonne Ruwaida	Green Party	Stockholm Municipality
10	Bo Könberg	Liberal People's Party	Stockholm Municipality
11	Stefan Attefall	Christian Democrats	Stockholm Municipality
12	Anders Ygeman	Social Democratic Party	Stockholm Municipality
13	Nikos Papadopoulos	Social Democratic Party	Stockholm Municipality
14	Anna Lilliehöök	Moderate Party	Stockholm Municipality
15	Lars Ohly	Left Party	Stockholm Municipality
16	Helena Höij	Christian Democrats	Stockholm Municipality
17	Kalle Larsson	Left Party	Stockholm Municipality
18	Ana Maria Narti	Liberal People's Party	Stockholm Municipality
19	**Bosse Ringholm** (replaced by Kaj Nordquist)	Social Democratic Party	Stockholm Municipality
20	Mauricio Rojas	Liberal People's Party	Stockholm Municipality
21	Maria Hassan	Social Democratic Party	Stockholm Municipality
22	Lena Adelsohn Liljeroth	Moderate Party	Stockholm Municipality
23	Börje Vestlund	Social Democratic Party	Stockholm Municipality
24	Gunilla Carlsson	Moderate Party	Stockholm Municipality
25	Joe Frans	Social Democratic Party	Stockholm Municipality
26	Nyamko Sabuni	Liberal People's Party	Stockholm Municipality
27	Veronica Palm	Social Democratic Party	Stockholm Municipality
28	Birgitta Ohlsson	Liberal People's Party	Stockholm Municipality
29	Gustav Fridolin	Green Party	Stockholm Municipality
30	Anita Johansson	Social Democratic Party	Stockholm County
31	Lars Leijonborg	Liberal People's Party	Stockholm County
32	Jan Emanuel Johansson	Social Democratic Party	Stockholm County
33	Gudrun Schyman	independent (Feminist Initiative)	Stockholm County
34	**Mona Sahlin** (replaced by Britta Lejon)	Social Democratic Party	Stockholm County
35	Mats Odell	Christian Democrats	Stockholm County
36	Göran Lennmarker	Moderate Party	Stockholm County
37	Inger Davidson	Christian Democrats	Stockholm County
38	Björn Hamilton	Moderate Party	Stockholm County
39	Fredrik Reinfeldt	Moderate Party	Stockholm County
40	Karin Pilsäter	Liberal People's Party	Stockholm County
41	Ola Rask	Social Democratic Party	Stockholm County
42	Björn von Sydow (replaced by Mariam Osman Sherifay)	Social Democratic Party	Stockholm County
43	Eva Arvidsson	Social Democratic Party	Stockholm County
44	**Pär Nuder** (replaced by Christer Erlandsson)	Social Democratic Party	Stockholm County
45	Carina Moberg	Social Democratic Party	Stockholm County
46	Christina Axelsson	Social Democratic Party	Stockholm County
47	Marietta de Pourbaix-Lundin	Moderate Party	Stockholm County
48	Ingvar Svensson	Christian Democrats	Stockholm County
49	Catharina Elmsäter-Svärd	Moderate Party	Stockholm County
50	Cinnika Beiming (replaced by Maryam Yazdanfar)	Social Democratic Party	Stockholm County
51	Tommy Waidelich	Social Democratic Party	Stockholm County
52	Henrik Westman	Moderate Party	Stockholm County
53	Helena Bargholtz	Liberal People's Party	Stockholm County
54	Lars Ångström	Green Party	Stockholm County
55	Mats Einarsson	Left Party	Stockholm County
56	Yilmaz Kerimo	Social Democratic Party	Stockholm County
57	Karin Enström	Moderate Party	Stockholm County
58	Carl B. Hamilton	Liberal People's Party	Stockholm County
59	Gunnar Andrén	Liberal People's Party	Stockholm County
60	Sermin Özürküt	Left Party	Stockholm County
61	Kerstin Lundgren	Centre Party	Stockholm County
62	Nina Lundström	Liberal People's Party	Stockholm County
63	Ewa Björling	Moderate Party	Stockholm County
64	Hillevi Engström	Moderate Party	Stockholm County
65	Mikaela Valtersson	Green Party	Stockholm County
66	Martin Andreasson	Liberal People's Party	Stockholm County
67	Mia Franzén	Liberal People's Party	Stockholm County
68	Mikael Damberg	Social Democratic Party	Stockholm County
69	Lennart Hedquist	Moderate Party	Uppsala County
70	Ingrid Burman	Left Party	Uppsala County
71	Rigmor Stenmark	Centre Party	Uppsala County
72	Tone Tingsgård	Social Democratic Party	Uppsala County
73	Per Bill	Moderate Party	Uppsala County
74	**Thomas Östros** (replaced by Rezene Tesfazion)	Social Democratic Party	Uppsala County
75	Mats Berglind	Social Democratic Party	Uppsala County
76	Mikael Oscarsson	Christian Democrats	Uppsala County
77	Åsa Domeij	Green Party	Uppsala County
78	Agneta Gille	Social Democratic Party	Uppsala County
79	Cecilia Wikström	Liberal People's Party	Uppsala County
80	Erik Ullenhag	Liberal People's Party	Uppsala County
81	Per Westerberg	Moderate Party	Södermanland County
82	Reynoldh Furustrand	Social Democratic Party	Södermanland County
83	Michael Hagberg	Social Democratic Party	Södermanland County
84	Laila Bjurling	Social Democratic Party	Södermanland County
85	Elisebeht Markström	Social Democratic Party	Södermanland County
86	Björn von der Esch	Christian Democrats	Södermanland County
87	Fredrik Olovsson	Social Democratic Party	Södermanland County
88	Maria Wetterstrand	Green Party	Södermanland County
89	Elina Linna	Left Party	Södermanland County
90	Liselott Hagberg	Liberal People's Party	Södermanland County
91	Roger Tiefensee	Centre Party	Södermanland County
92	Stefan Hagfeldt	Moderate Party	Östergötland County
93	Sonia Karlsson	Social Democratic Party	Östergötland County
94	Britt-Marie Danestig	Left Party	Östergötland County
95	Conny Öhman	Social Democratic Party	Östergötland County
96	Berndt Sköldestig	Social Democratic Party	Östergötland County
97	Helena Hillar Rosenqvist	Green Party	Östergötland County
98	Yvonne Andersson	Christian Democrats	Östergötland County
99	Staffan Danielsson	Centre Party	Östergötland County
100	Gunnar Axén	Moderate Party	Östergötland County
101	Anne Ludvigsson	Social Democratic Party	Östergötland County
102	Sven Brus	Christian Democrats	Östergötland County
103	Anna Lindgren	Moderate Party	Östergötland County
104	Linnéa Darell	Liberal People's Party	Östergötland County
105	Billy Gustafsson	Social Democratic Party	Östergötland County
106	Louise Malmström	Social Democratic Party	Östergötland County
107	Johan Löfstrand	Social Democratic Party	Östergötland County
108	Karin Granbom	Liberal People's Party	Östergötland County
109	Magdalena Andersson	Moderate Party	Jönköping County
110	Alf Svensson	Christian Democrats	Jönköping County
111	Göran Hägglund	Christian Democrats	Jönköping County
112	Martin Nilsson	Social Democratic Party	Jönköping County
113	Margareta Sandgren	Social Democratic Party	Jönköping County
114	Alice Åström	Left Party	Jönköping County
115	Carina Hägg	Social Democratic Party	Jönköping County
116	Margareta Andersson	Centre Party	Jönköping County
117	Göte Wahlström	Social Democratic Party	Jönköping County
118	Maria Larsson	Christian Democrats	Jönköping County
119	Helene Petersson	Social Democratic Party	Jönköping County
120	Bengt-Anders Johansson	Moderate Party	Jönköping County
121	Tobias Krantz	Liberal People's Party	Jönköping County
122	Anders G. Högmark	Moderate Party	Kronoberg County
123	Eskil Erlandsson	Centre Party	Kronoberg County
124	Tomas Eneroth	Social Democratic Party	Kronoberg County
125	Lars Wegendal	Social Democratic Party	Kronoberg County
126	Carina Adolfsson Elgestam	Social Democratic Party	Kronoberg County
127	Olle Sandahl	Christian Democrats	Kronoberg County
128	Gunnar Nordmark	Liberal People's Party	Kronoberg County
129	Agne Hansson	Centre Party	Kalmar County
130	Chatrine Pålsson	Christian Democrats	Kalmar County
131	Krister Örnfjäder	Social Democratic Party	Kalmar County
132	Nils Fredrik Aurelius	Moderate Party	Kalmar County
133	Lennart Beijer	Left Party	Kalmar County
134	Agneta Ringman	Social Democratic Party	Kalmar County
135	Ann-Marie Fagerström	Social Democratic Party	Kalmar County
136	Håkan Juholt	Social Democratic Party	Kalmar County
137	Sverker Thorén	Liberal People's Party	Kalmar County
138	Lilian Virgin	Social Democratic Party	Gotland County
139	Christer Engelhardt	Social Democratic Party	Gotland County
140	Christer Skoog	Social Democratic Party	Blekinge County
141	Jan Björkman	Social Democratic Party	Blekinge County
142	Jeppe Johnsson	Moderate Party	Blekinge County
143	Johnny Gylling	Christian Democrats	Blekinge County
144	Heli Berg	Liberal People's Party	Blekinge County
145	Kerstin Andersson	Social Democratic Party	Blekinge County
146	Hillevi Larsson	Social Democratic Party	Malmö Municipality
147	**Göran Persson** (replaced by Luciano Astudillo)	Social Democratic Party	Malmö Municipality
148	Marie Granlund	Social Democratic Party	Malmö Municipality
149	Britt-Marie Lindkvist	Social Democratic Party	Malmö Municipality
150	Sten Lundström	Left Party	Malmö Municipality
151	Leif Jakobsson	Social Democratic Party	Malmö Municipality
152	Carl-Axel Roslund	Moderate Party	Malmö Municipality
153	Allan Widman	Liberal People's Party	Malmö Municipality
154	Tobias Billström	Moderate Party	Malmö Municipality
155	Annika Nilsson (replaced by Johan Andersson)	Social Democratic Party	west Skåne County
156	Kenneth Lantz	Christian Democrats	west Skåne County
157	Cristina Husmark Pehrsson	Moderate Party	west Skåne County
158	Anders Karlsson	Social Democratic Party	west Skåne County
159	Kent Härstedt	Social Democratic Party	west Skåne County
160	Tasso Stafilidis	Left Party	west Skåne County
161	Christin Hagberg	Social Democratic Party	west Skåne County
162	Tina Acketoft	Liberal People's Party	west Skåne County
163	Torkild Strandberg	Liberal People's Party	west Skåne County
164	Peter Danielsson	Moderate Party	west Skåne County
165	Anita Jönsson	Social Democratic Party	south Skåne County
166	Ronny Olander	Social Democratic Party	south Skåne County
167	Catherine Persson	Social Democratic Party	south Skåne County
168	Bo Bernhardsson	Social Democratic Party	south Skåne County
169	Ulf Nilsson	Liberal People's Party	south Skåne County
170	Karin Svensson Smith	independent (Green Party)	south Skåne County
171	**Morgan Johansson** (replaced by Inger Jarl Beck)	Social Democratic Party	south Skåne County
172	Lars Lindblad	Moderate Party	south Skåne County
173	Ewa Thalén Finné	Moderate Party	south Skåne County
174	Peter Althin	Christian Democrats	south Skåne County
175	Anne-Marie Pålsson	Moderate Party	south Skåne County
176	Marie Wahlgren	Liberal People's Party	south Skåne County
177	Ulf Holm	Green Party	south Skåne County
178	Johan Linander	Centre Party	south Skåne County
179	Maud Ekendahl	Moderate Party	north and east Skåne County
180	Tuve Skånberg	Christian Democrats	north and east Skåne County
181	Ulla Wester	Social Democratic Party	north and east Skåne County
182	Sven-Erik Sjöstrand	Left Party	north and east Skåne County
183	Anders Bengtsson	Social Democratic Party	north and east Skåne County
184	Christer Nylander	Liberal People's Party	north and east Skåne County
185	Kerstin Engle	Social Democratic Party	north and east Skåne County
186	Lars-Ivar Ericsson	Centre Party	north and east Skåne County
187	Margareta Pålsson	Moderate Party	north and east Skåne County
188	Göran Persson	Social Democratic Party	north and east Skåne County
189	Christer Adelsbo	Social Democratic Party	north and east Skåne County
190	Alf Eriksson	Social Democratic Party	Halland County
191	Majléne Westerlund Panke	Social Democratic Party	Halland County
192	Pär Axel Sahlberg	Social Democratic Party	Halland County
193	Hans Hoff	Social Democratic Party	Halland County
194	Lennart Kollmats	Liberal People's Party	Halland County
195	Kjell-Erik Karlsson	Left Party	Halland County
196	Lars Gustafsson	Christian Democrats	Halland County
197	Jan Ertsborn	Liberal People's Party	Halland County
198	Anne Marie Brodén	Moderate Party	Halland County
199	Camilla Lindberg	Centre Party	Halland County
200	Henrik von Sydow	Moderate Party	Halland County
201	Marianne Carlström	Social Democratic Party	Gothenburg
202	Erling Bager	Liberal People's Party	Gothenburg
203	Rolf Olsson	Left Party	Gothenburg
204	Claes-Göran Brandin	Social Democratic Party	Gothenburg
205	Eva Flyborg	Liberal People's Party	Gothenburg
206	Siw Wittgren-Ahl	Social Democratic Party	Gothenburg
207	Göran Lindblad	Moderate Party	Gothenburg
208	Anita Sidén	Moderate Party	Gothenburg
209	Berit Jóhannesson	Left Party	Gothenburg
210	Per Landgren	Christian Democrats	Gothenburg
211	Cecilia Magnusson	Moderate Party	Gothenburg
212	Claes Roxbergh	Green Party	Gothenburg
213	Annelie Enochson	Christian Democrats	Gothenburg
214	**Leif Pagrotsky** (replaced by Rolf Lindén)	Social Democratic Party	Gothenburg
215	Lars Johansson	Social Democratic Party	Gothenburg
216	Gunilla Carlsson	Social Democratic Party	Gothenburg
217	Cecilia Wigström	Liberal People's Party	Gothenburg
218	Axel Darvik	Liberal People's Party	Gothenburg
219	Lennart Nilsson	Social Democratic Party	west Västra Götaland County
220	Lars Bäckström	Left Party	west Västra Götaland County
221	Inger René	Moderate Party	west Västra Götaland County
222	Kent Olsson	Moderate Party	west Västra Götaland County
223	Mona Berglund Nilsson	Social Democratic Party	west Västra Götaland County
224	Rosita Runegrund	Christian Democrats	west Västra Götaland County
225	Åsa Torstensson	Centre Party	west Västra Götaland County
226	Jan-Olof Larsson	Social Democratic Party	west Västra Götaland County
227	Marita Aronson	Liberal People's Party	west Västra Götaland County
228	Mona Jönsson	Green Party	west Västra Götaland County
229	Lars Tysklind	Liberal People's Party	west Västra Götaland County
230	Catharina Bråkenhielm	Social Democratic Party	west Västra Götaland County
231	Kenneth G. Forslund	Social Democratic Party	west Västra Götaland County
232	Britt Bohlin Olsson	Social Democratic Party	north Västra Götaland County
233	Barbro Feltzing	Green Party	north Västra Götaland County
234	Nils-Erik Söderqvist	Social Democratic Party	north Västra Götaland County
235	Elizabeth Nyström	Moderate Party	north Västra Götaland County
236	Ingemar Vänerlöv	Christian Democrats	north Västra Götaland County
237	Christina Nenes	Social Democratic Party	north Västra Götaland County
238	Rossana Dinamarca	Left Party	north Västra Götaland County
239	Anita Brodén	Liberal People's Party	north Västra Götaland County
240	Peter Jonsson	Social Democratic Party	north Västra Götaland County
241	Annika Qarlsson	Centre Party	north Västra Götaland County
242	Arne Kjörnsberg	Social Democratic Party	south Västra Götaland County
243	Berndt Ekholm	Social Democratic Party	south Västra Götaland County
244	Sonja Fransson (replaced by Ann-Christin Ahlberg)	Social Democratic Party	south Västra Götaland County
245	Anne-Marie Ekström	Liberal People's Party	south Västra Götaland County
246	Else-Marie Lindgren	Christian Democrats	south Västra Götaland County
247	Ulf Sjösten	Moderate Party	south Västra Götaland County
248	Claes Västerteg	Centre Party	south Västra Götaland County
249	Kjell Nordström	Social Democratic Party	east Västra Götaland County
250	Birgitta Carlsson	Centre Party	east Västra Götaland County
251	Holger Gustafsson	Christian Democrats	east Västra Götaland County
252	Per Rosengren	Left Party	east Västra Götaland County
253	Monica Green	Social Democratic Party	east Västra Götaland County
254	Urban Ahlin	Social Democratic Party	east Västra Götaland County
255	Carina Ohlsson	Social Democratic Party	east Västra Götaland County
256	Christer Winbäck	Liberal People's Party	east Västra Götaland County
257	Cecilia Widegren	Moderate Party	east Västra Götaland County
258	Jarl Lander	Social Democratic Party	Värmland County
259	Ann-Kristine Johansson	Social Democratic Party	Värmland County
260	Marie Engström	Left Party	Värmland County
261	Marina Pettersson	Social Democratic Party	Värmland County
262	Viviann Gerdin	Centre Party	Värmland County
263	Runar Patriksson	Liberal People's Party	Värmland County
264	Dan Kihlström	Christian Democrats	Värmland County
265	Jan-Evert Rådhström	Moderate Party	Värmland County
266	Leif Björnlod	Green Party	Värmland County
267	Tommy Ternemar	Social Democratic Party	Värmland County
268	Berit Högman	Social Democratic Party	Värmland County
269	Inger Lundberg	Social Democratic Party	Örebro County
270	Nils-Göran Holmqvist	Social Democratic Party	Örebro County
271	Helena Frisk	Social Democratic Party	Örebro County
272	Sten Tolgfors	Moderate Party	Örebro County
273	Peter Pedersen	Left Party	Örebro County
274	Mikael Johansson	Green Party	Örebro County
275	Johan Pehrson	Liberal People's Party	Örebro County
276	Sofia Larsen	Centre Party	Örebro County
277	Lennart Axelsson	Social Democratic Party	Örebro County
278	Sven Gunnar Persson	Christian Democrats	Örebro County
279	**Thomas Bodström** (replaced by Matilda Ernkrans)	Social Democratic Party	Örebro County
280	Göran Magnusson	Social Democratic Party	Västmanland County
281	Margareta Israelsson	Social Democratic Party	Västmanland County
282	Kerstin Heinemann	Liberal People's Party	Västmanland County
283	Tomas Högström	Moderate Party	Västmanland County
284	**Sven-Erik Österberg** (replaced by Pia Nilsson)	Social Democratic Party	Västmanland County
285	Mariann Ytterberg	Social Democratic Party	Västmanland County
286	Paavo Vallius	Social Democratic Party	Västmanland County
287	Jörgen Johansson	Centre Party	Västmanland County
288	Karin Thorborg	Left Party	Västmanland County
289	Torsten Lindström	Christian Democrats	Västmanland County
290	Per Erik Granström	Social Democratic Party	Dalarna County
291	Barbro Hietala Nordlund	Social Democratic Party	Dalarna County
292	Rolf Gunnarsson	Moderate Party	Dalarna County
293	Lennart Fremling	Liberal People's Party	Dalarna County
294	Kenneth Johansson	Centre Party	Dalarna County
295	Jan Lindholm	Green Party	Dalarna County
296	Marita Ulvskog	Social Democratic Party	Dalarna County
297	Kurt Kvarnström	Social Democratic Party	Dalarna County
298	Anders Wiklund	Left Party	Dalarna County
299	Ulrik Lindgren	Christian Democrats	Dalarna County
300	Anneli Särnblad	Social Democratic Party	Dalarna County
301	Sinikka Bohlin	Social Democratic Party	Gävleborg County
302	Patrik Norinder	Moderate Party	Gävleborg County
303	**Ulrica Messing** (replaced by Yoomi Renström)	Social Democratic Party	Gävleborg County
304	Owe Hellberg	Left Party	Gävleborg County
305	Sven Bergström	Centre Party	Gävleborg County
306	Raimo Pärssinen	Social Democratic Party	Gävleborg County
307	Per-Olof Svensson	Social Democratic Party	Gävleborg County
308	Ragnwi Marcelind	Christian Democrats	Gävleborg County
309	Lotta Hedström	Green Party	Gävleborg County
310	Hans Backman	Liberal People's Party	Gävleborg County
312	Hans Stenberg	Social Democratic Party	Västernorrland County
313	Agneta Lundberg	Social Democratic Party	Västernorrland County
314	Susanne Eberstein	Social Democratic Party	Västernorrland County
315	Kerstin Kristiansson Karlstedt	Social Democratic Party	Västernorrland County
316	Göran Norlander	Social Democratic Party	Västernorrland County
317	Birgitta Sellén	Centre Party	Västernorrland County
318	Gunilla Wahlén	Left Party	Västernorrland County
319	Lars Lindén	Christian Democrats	Västernorrland County
320	Solveig Hellquist	Liberal People's Party	Västernorrland County
321	Bertil Kjellberg	Moderate Party	Västernorrland County
322	Gunnar Sandberg	Social Democratic Party	Jämtland County
323	Rune Berglund	Social Democratic Party	Jämtland County
324	**Berit Andnor** (replaced by Marie Nordén)	Social Democratic Party	Jämtland County
325	Ola Sundell	Moderate Party	Jämtland County
326	Camilla Sköld Jansson	Left Party	Jämtland County
327	Håkan Larsson	Centre Party	Jämtland County
328	Carin Lundberg	Social Democratic Party	Västerbotten County
329	Britta Rådström	Social Democratic Party	Västerbotten County
330	Lars Lilja	Social Democratic Party	Västerbotten County
331	Lennart Gustavsson	Left Party	Västerbotten County
332	Yvonne Ångström	Liberal People's Party	Västerbotten County
333	Karl Gustav Abrahamsson	Social Democratic Party	Västerbotten County
334	Gunilla Tjernberg	Christian Democrats	Västerbotten County
335	Ulla Löfgren	Moderate Party	Västerbotten County
336	Ingegerd Saarinen	Green Party	Västerbotten County
337	Sören Wibe	Social Democratic Party	Västerbotten County
338	Maud Olofsson	Centre Party	Västerbotten County
339	Lennart Klockare	Social Democratic Party	Norrbotten County
340	Kristina Zakrisson	Social Democratic Party	Norrbotten County
341	Birgitta Ahlqvist	Social Democratic Party	Norrbotten County
342	Siv Holma	Left Party	Norrbotten County
343	Peter Eriksson	Green Party	Norrbotten County
344	Erling Wälivaara	Christian Democrats	Norrbotten County
345	Karin Åström	Social Democratic Party	Norrbotten County
346	Lars U. Granberg	Social Democratic Party	Norrbotten County
347	Maria Öberg	Social Democratic Party	Norrbotten County
348	Krister Hammarbergh	Moderate Party	Norrbotten County
349	Anna Grönlund Krantz	Liberal People's Party	Norrbotten County

== Members who have resigned ==
Seat	Resigned member	Party	Constituency	Replaced by	From
288	Stig Henriksson	Left Party	Västmanland County	Karin Thorborg	October 1, 2002
346	**Björn Rosengren**	Social Democratic Party	Norrbotten County	Lars U. Granberg	October 22, 2002
38	Chris Heister	Moderate Party	Stockholm County	Björn Hamilton	November 7, 2002
109	Anders Björck	Moderate Party	Jönköping County	Magdalena Andersson	January 1, 2003
92	Per Unckel	Moderate Party	Östergötland County	Stefan Hagfeldt	January 1, 2003
203	Johan Lönnroth	Left Party	Gothenburg	Rolf Olsson	February 6, 2003
87	**Anna Lindh**	Social Democratic Party	Södermanland County	Fredrik Olovsson	September 11, 2003
322	**Margareta Winberg**	Social Democratic Party	Jämtland County	Gunnar Sandberg	October 31, 2003
32	**Ingela Thalén**	Social Democratic Party	Stockholm County	Jan Emanuel Johansson	June 15, 2004
8	Inger Segelström	Social Democratic Party	Stockholm Municipality	Inger Nordlander	July 20, 2004
1	Gunnar Hökmark	Moderate Party	Stockholm Municipality	Carl-Erik Skårman	July 20, 2004
348	Anna Ibrisagic	Moderate Party	Norrbotten County	Krister Hammarbergh	July 20, 2004
99	Lena Ek	Centre Party	Östergötland County	Staffan Danielsson	July 20, 2004
345	Anders Sundström	Social Democratic Party	Norrbotten County	Karin Åström	August 1, 2004
329	Lena Sandlin-Hedman	Social Democratic Party	Västerbotten County	Britta Rådström	September 14, 2004
173	Carl-Axel Johansson	Moderate Party	south Skåne County	Ewa Thalén Finné	September 14, 2004
179	Bo Lundgren	Moderate Party	north and east Skåne County	Maud Ekendahl	October 1, 2004
119	**Lars Engqvist**	Social Democratic Party	Jönköping County	Helene Petersson	October 1, 2004
146	**Lars-Erik Lövdén**	Social Democratic Party	Malmö Municipality	Hillevi Larsson	November 1, 2004
295	Kerstin-Maria Stalín	Green Party	Dalarna County	Jan Lindholm	November 15, 2004
10	Bo Könberg	Liberal People's Party	Stockholm Municipality	Louise Edlind-Friberg	January 1, 2006
269	Inger Lundberg	Social Democratic Party	Örebro County	Matilda Ernkrans	February 26, 2006
96	Berndt Sköldestig	Social Democratic Party	Östergötland County	Britt Olauson	April 18, 2006
