= Roslund =

Roslund is a surname. Notable people with the surname include:

- Anders Roslund (born 1961), Swedish writer
- Carl-Axel Roslund (born 1948), Swedish politician
- Ivar Roslund (1907–1988), Swedish footballer
- Lennart Roslund (born 1946), Swedish sailor
