= Gabriel Romanus =

Swedish politician (born 1939)

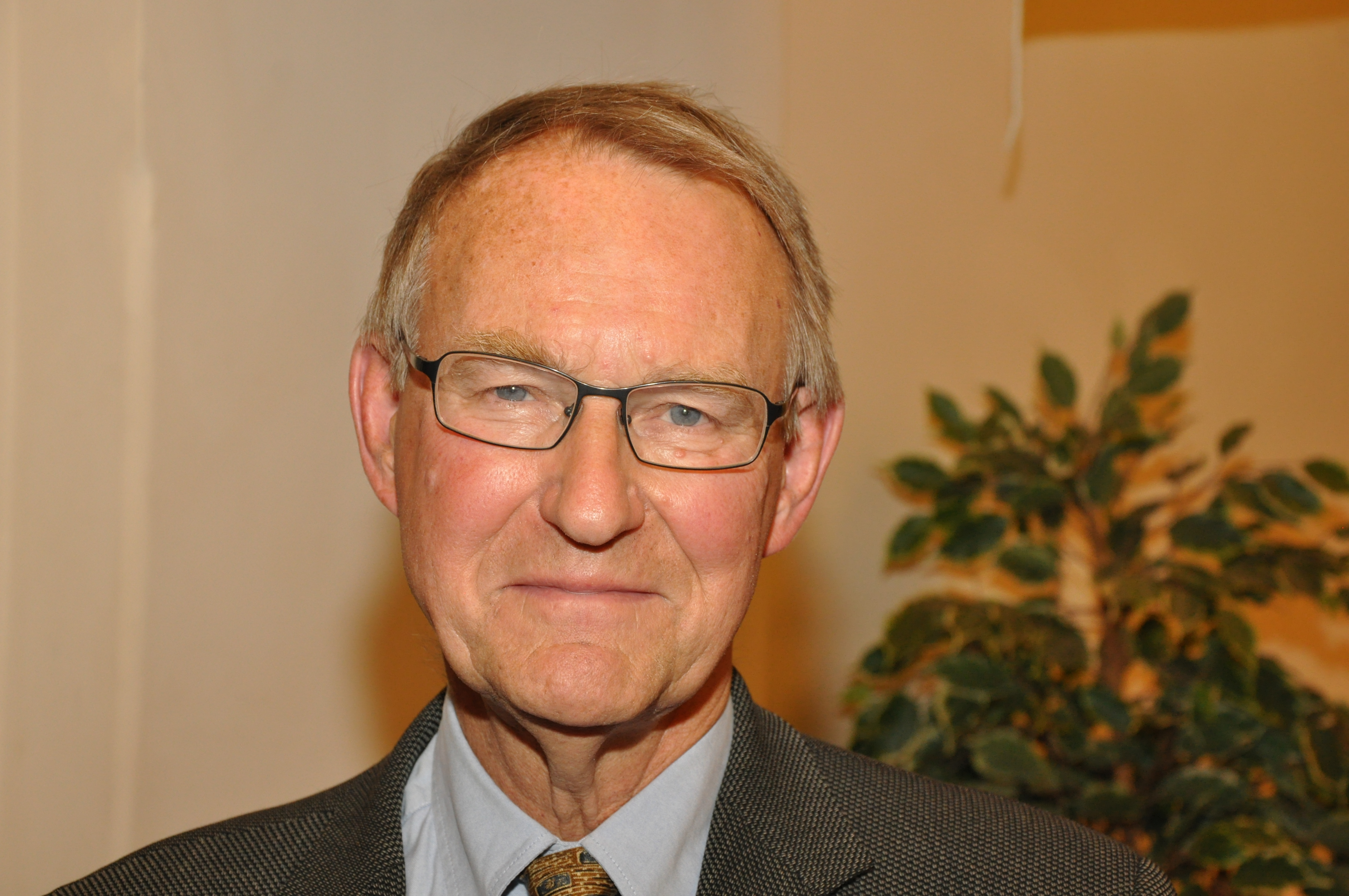

Lars Gabriel Romanus (born 25 January 1939) is a Swedish liberal politician. He served as Minister of Social Affairs 1978–1979, as a member of the Riksdag 1969–1982 and again 2002–2006. He has chaired the Swedish delegation to the Nordic Council and was President of the council in 2004. He has also been chairman of Svenska Barnboksinstitutet (The Swedish Institute for Children's Literature). Romanus was the CEO of the government-owned chain of liquor stores, Systembolaget, from 1982 to 1999. He has worked for restrictive politics on alcohol for a long time.
