= Mia Franzén =

Swedish politician (born 1971)

Mia Franzén (born 13 July 1971) is a Swedish Liberal People's Party politician. She was a member of the Riksdag from 2002 to 2006.
