= Amanda Agestav =

Swedish politician (born 1974)

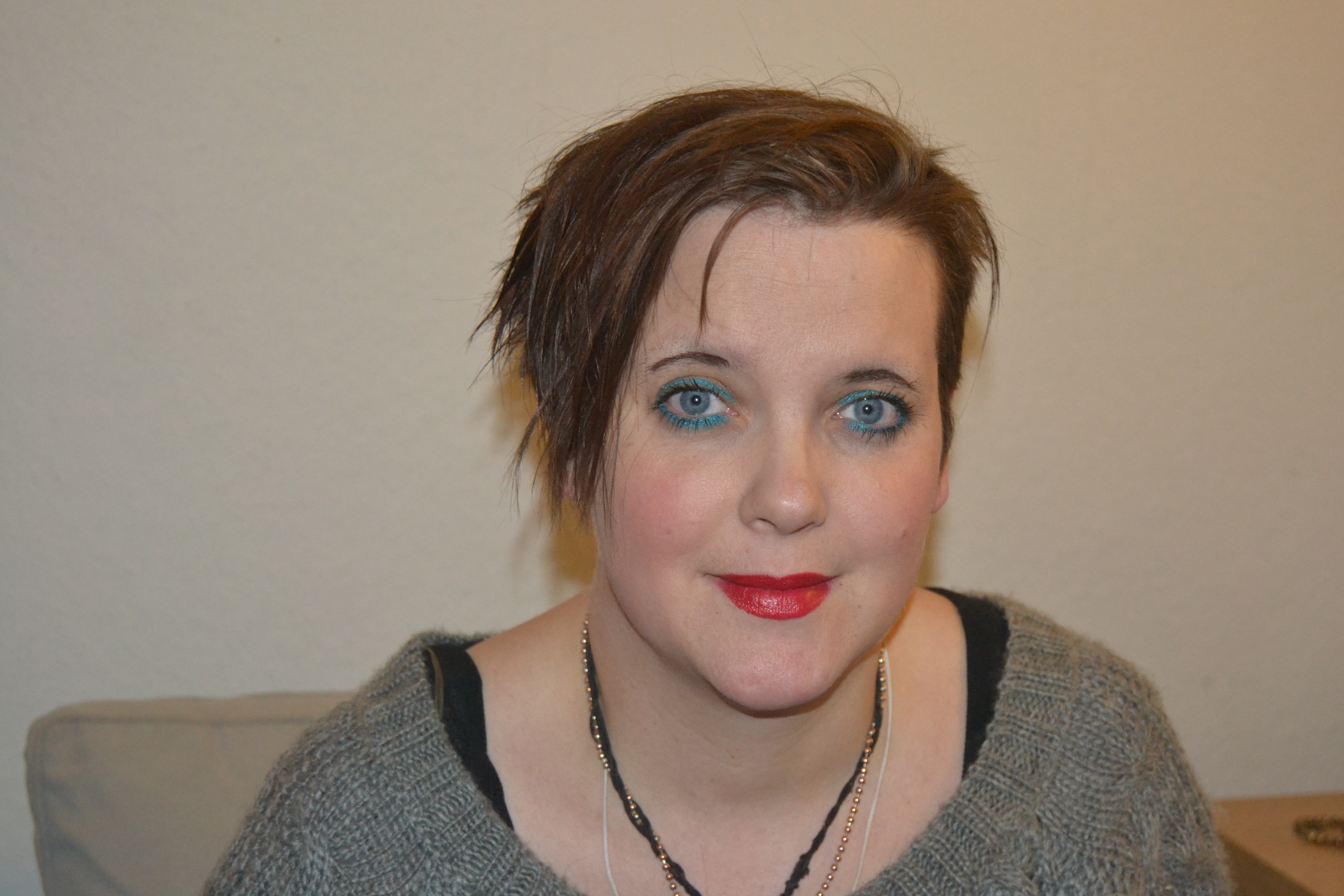
- Born: Ester Amanda Elisabeth Grönlund; 26 January 1974 (age 52); Västerås, Västmanland, Sweden
- Occupation: Politician
- Known for: Member of the Riksdag

Amanda Grönlund (born 26 January 1974 in Västerås) is a Swedish Christian Democrat politician. She was a member of the Riksdag from the constituency Stockholms län from 1998 to 2002.

She was appointed municipal commissioner in Västerås following the 2018 election.
