= Olle Sandahl =

Swedish politician (born 1950)

Olle Sandahl, born 1950, is a Swedish Christian democratic politician, member of the Riksdag 2002–2006. Sandahl is a dentist.
