= Inger Nordlander =

Swedish politician (born 1938)

Inger Nordlander (born 1938) is a Swedish social democratic politician, member of the Riksdag 2004–2006.
