= Robert Dockered =

Swedish politician (1911–2001)

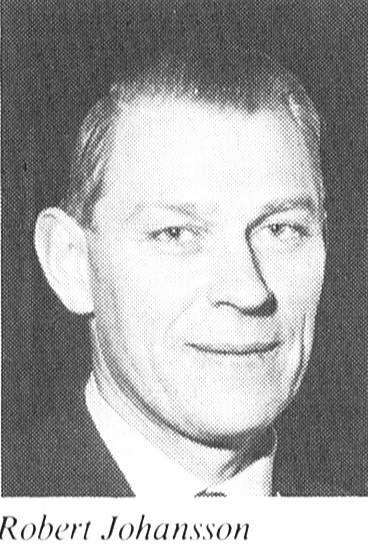
Robert Dockered

Robert Dockered (born Robert Johansson; 22 April 1911 – 2001) was a Swedish politician. He was a member of the Centre Party. Robert Dockered was a member of Första kammaren 1958–1960, elected in Älvsborg County constituency. He was then a member of Andra kammaren 1961–1970 and belonged to the single chamber parliament after the elections in autumn 1970, elected in Älvsborg County Northern constituency. He traded in the 60's last name to Dockered.
