= Anna Grönlund Krantz =

Swedish politician (born 1971)

Anna Grönlund Krantz (born 1971) is a Swedish Liberal People's Party politician. She was a member of the Riksdag from 2002 until 2006.
