= Anders Bengtsson =

Swedish politician (born 1968)

Anders Bengtsson (born 6 March 1968) is a Swedish Social Democratic politician, member of the Riksdag from 2002 to 2006.
