= Yvonne Ångström =

Swedish politician (born 1940)

Yvonne Ångström (born 1940) is a Swedish Liberal People's Party politician. She was a member of the Riksdag from 1998 to 2006.
