= Sverker Thorén =

Swedish politician (born 1955)

Sverker Thorén (born 28 January 1955), is a Swedish Liberal People's Party politician, member of the Riksdag 2002–2006.
