= Caroline Hagström =

Swedish politician (born 1964)

- Born: 1964 (age 61–62)
- Occupation: Politician
- Known for: Member of the Riksdag

Caroline Hagström (born 1964) is a Swedish Christian Democrat politician and sports coach. She served as a member of the Riksdag from 1998 to 2002, where she was member of the Environment Committee.
