= Anita Sidén =

Swedish politician (born 1940)

Anita Sidén (born 25 January 1940) is a Swedish politician of the Moderate Party. She remained the member of the Riksdag from 1998 to 2006.
