= Heli Berg =

Swedish politician (born 1953)

Heli Berg (born September 26, 1953) is a Swedish Liberal People's Party politician, member of the Riksdag 2002–2006. She represented Blekinge County.
