= Torsten Lindström =

Swedish politician (born 1974)

Torsten Lindström (born September 6, 1974) is a Swedish Christian democratic politician, member of the Riksdag 2002–2006.
