= Björn Hamilton =

Swedish politician (born 1945)

Count Björn Hamilton

Member of the Riksdag for Stockholm County
- In office 2002–2010

Personal details
- Born: Björn Axel Åke Malcolm Hamilton; March 28, 1945 (age 81) Gothenburg, Sweden
- Party: Moderate Party
- Education: Lund University; University of California, Berkeley

Björn Axel Åke Malcolm Hamilton (born March 28, 1945) is a Swedish count, engineer and politician. He has been a member of the Swedish parliament for the Moderate Party since 2002, serving as a member of the Riksdag for Stockholm County from 2002 to 2010.

== Early life and career ==
Hamilton was born in Gothenburg on March 28, 1945, the son of Björn Hamilton and Barbro Pauli. Hamilton's paternal grandfather is physician Axel Hamilton. Hamilton graduated from Lund University in 1970, before gaining a Master of Science degree from the University of California, Berkeley in 1973. He subsequently worked as a consultant at Kjessler & Mannerstråle and Scandiaconsult, and was a business area manager for Statens Järnväger from 1984 until 1992.

== Political career ==
Between 1992 and 2002, Hamilton was chairman of the municipal council of Danderyd, Stockholm County. In 2002 he was elected as a member of the Riksdag for Stockholm County. During his tenure, he served as a member of the committees for transport (2003-2006), foreign affairs (2006-2007), the EU (2006–10) and nutrition (2007-2010). For several months in 2006 and 2007 he served as chairman of the EU committee following Göran Lennmarker's promotion to chairman of the foreign affairs committee.

Hamilton is currently the chairman of the Danderyd municipal council.
