= Anne-Marie Ekström =

Swedish politician (born 1947)

Anne-Marie Ekström (born 1947) is a Swedish Liberal People's Party politician. She was a member of the Riksdag from 2002 to 2006.
