= Sten Lundström =

Swedish politician (born 1952)

Sten Lundström (born December 13, 1952, in Malmö) is a Swedish Left Party politician, member of the Riksdag 1998–2006.
