= Ulrik Lindgren =

Swedish politician (born 1955)

Ulrik Lindgren (born 1955) is a Swedish Christian democratic politician, member of the Riksdag 2002–2006.
