= Marie Wahlgren =

Swedish academic and politician (born 1962)

Marie Wahlgren (born 1962) is a Swedish academic and Liberal People's Party politician.

== Career ==
Wahlgren was a member of the Riksdag from 2002 until 2006.

She has published a number of journal articles on food technology.

== Selected bibliography ==
=== Journal articles ===
- Wahlgren, Marie; Arnebrant, Thomas (1991). "Protein adsorption to solid surfaces". Trends in Biotechnology. 9 (6): 201–208. doi:10.1016/0167-7799(91)90064-o. PMID 1367245.
- Wahlgren, Marie; Arnebrant, Thomas; Lundström, Ingemar (1995). "The Adsorption of Lysozyme to Hydrophilic Silicon Oxide Surfaces: Comparison between Experimental Data and Models for Adsorption Kinetics". Journal of Colloid and Interface Science. 175 (2): 506–514. Bibcode:1995JCIS..175..506W. doi:10.1006/jcis.1995.1482.
- Fredenberg, Susanne; Wahlgren, Marie; Reslow, Mats; Axelsson, Anders (2011). "The mechanisms of drug release in poly(lactic-co-glycolic acid)-based drug delivery systems—A review". International Journal of Pharmaceutics. 415 (1–2): 34–52. doi:10.1016/j.ijpharm.2011.05.049. PMID 21640806.
