= Stefan Hagfeldt =

Swedish politician

Stefan Hagfeldt (born 30 June 1944) is a Swedish politician of the Moderate Party, member of the Riksdag 1998–2002, and then again 2003–2006.
