= Camilla Sköld Jansson =

Swedish politician (born 1957)

Camilla Sköld Jansson (born 1957) is a Swedish Left Party politician. She was a member of the Riksdag from 1998 to 2006.
