= Håkan Larsson (politician) =

Swedish politician (born 1950)

Håkan Larsson (born 1950) is a Swedish Centre Party politician, member of the Riksdag 2002–2006.
