= Bo Könberg =

Swedish politician (born 1945)

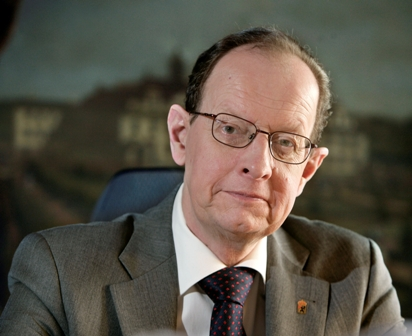
Bo Könberg

Bo Göran Könberg (born 14 October 1945 in Stockholm) is a Swedish Liberal People's Party politician and was a member of the Riksdag 1995–2005. In his political career Könberg has held many positions, among them:

- Chairman of the Board of the Swedish Pensions Agency, 2010-2015
- Governor (Swedish: landshövding) of Södermanland County, south of Stockholm, 2006 – 2012
- Head of the Liberal People's Party Group in Parliament (Riksdagen) 1998 – 2005
- Member of the Parliament 1994 – 2005
- Minister for Health Care and Social Security 1991 – 1994 (Swedish: Socialdepartementet) in the Bildt Cabinet, in which he was in charge of a major pension reform in 1994, the first “Non-financial” or Notional Defined Contribution (NDC) pension system decided by a Parliament.
- Head of the Liberal People's Party Group (Folkpartiet) in Stockholm County Council 1982 – 1991.
- County Council Commissioner for Health and Social Affairs, Stockholm County Council for two periods: 1978 – 1982 and 1985 – 1991.
- Bo Könberg was Chairman of the Program Committee for the Swedish Liberal People's Party, which in 1997 introduced the platform of the Party up to 2013.
- The Nordic Council of Ministers asked Bo Könberg to write an independent report on how the Nordic cooperation in the health field can be developed in the next 5–10 years. The report was delivered in the summer of 2014.
