= Gunnar Nordmark =

Swedish politician

Gunnar Nordmark, born 1954, is a Swedish Liberal People's Party politician and former member of the Riksdag from 2002 to 2006. He works as a member of Växjö Kommun as of 2020.
