= Linnéa Darell =

Swedish politician (born 1945)

Linnéa Darell (born 1945) is a Swedish Liberal People's Party politician. She was a member of the Riksdag from 2002 until 2006.
