= Carl-Erik Skårman =

Swedish politician

Carl-Erik Skårman (born 1939) is a Swedish politician who served as a member of the Riksdag for Stockholm County from 1998 to 2002 and 2004 to 2006. He is affiliated with the Moderate Party. From 1989 to 1994, Skårman was a member of the city council of Stockholm.

After having left the Riksdag and Stockholm, he has been active in local politics in Falköping since 2006.
