= Ingegerd Saarinen =

Swedish politician (born 1947)

Ingegerd Saarinen (born 1947) is a Swedish Green Party politician. She was a member of the Riksdag from 1999 to 2006.
