= Lennart Gustavsson =

Swedish politician (born 1954)

Lennart Gustavsson (born 1954), is a Swedish Left Party politician, member of the Riksdag 1998–2006.
