= Kjell-Erik Karlsson =

Swedish politician (born 1946)

Kjell-Erik Karlsson (born 4 February 1946) is a Swedish Left Party politician, member of the Riksdag 1998–2006.
