= Berit Jóhannesson =

Swedish politician (born 1946)

Berit Jóhannesson (born May 22, 1946, in Gothenburg) is a Swedish Left Party politician. She was a member of the Riksdag from 1998 to 2006.
