= Mats Einarsson =

Swedish politician (born 1960)

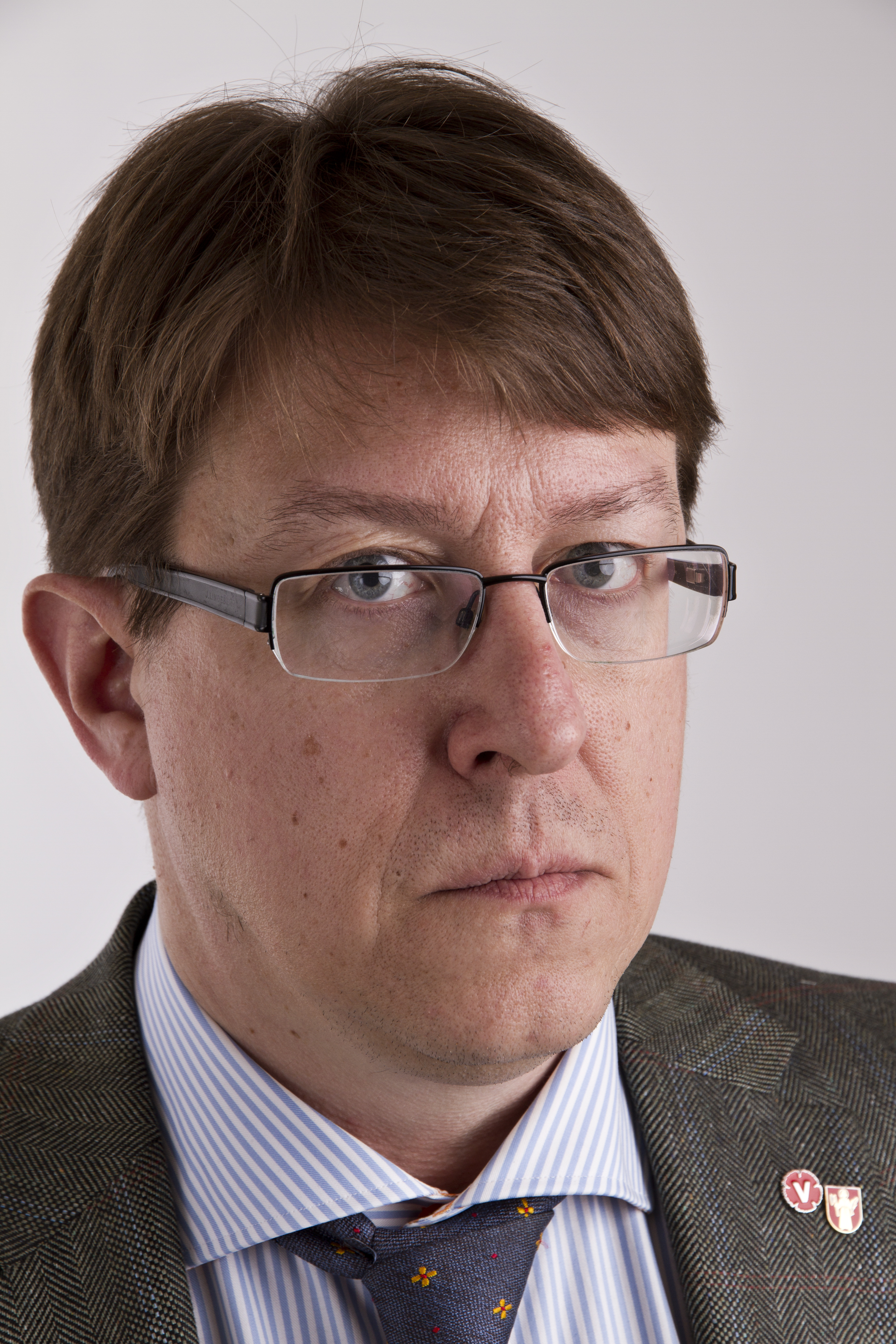

Member of the U.S. House of Representatives from 's Stockholm Municipality district

Personal details
- Born: 21 January 1960 (age 65)
- Party: Left Party (Sweden)

Mats Einarsson (born 1960) is a Swedish Left Party politician, member of the Riksdag 1998–2006.

In the Riksdag, he was a member of the Constitution Committee 1998–2006 and a member of the Council of Europe's Swedish delegation in 2002. He was also a deputy in the Civil Affairs Committee, the EU Committee, the Defense Committee, the Constitution Committee, the Combined Constitution and Foreign Affairs Committee, the Complaints Committee and the Swedish Delegation of the Council of Europe.
