= Christin Hagberg =

Swedish politician (born 1958)

Christin Hagberg (born Nilsson in 1958) is a Swedish Social Democratic Party politician. She has been a member of the Riksdag since 2002. She was also a member from 1995 to 1998.
