= Martin Andreasson =

Swedish politician (born 1970)

Martin Andreasson (born 1 October 1970 in Malmö), is a Swedish Liberal People's Party politician, and a member of the Riksdag from 2002 to 2006. He is openly gay. He is also an active member of Swedish science fiction fandom.
