= Maria Hassan =

Swedish politician (born 1952)

Maria Hassan (born 1952) is a Swedish Social Democratic Party politician. She was a member of the Riksdag from 2002 to 2006.

== Biography ==
She was born on 21 September 1952 in Khmelnytskyi Oblast. She graduated from the Khmelnytskyi Pedagogical College and the Kyiv State University, where she studied history. At the university, she met a Kurd from Syria who was studying international law, and the two married.

After graduating from university, she worked for eight years at the State Archives of Cinema, Photographic and Phonographic Documents. Her husband later moved to Sweden, and in 1986 Hassan joined him there with their two sons.

In 1994, Maria Hassan was elected to the Stockholm municipal council. From 2002 to 2006, she served as a member of the Riksdag representing the governing Swedish Social Democratic Party.

On 3 February 2020, she participated in a meeting with representatives of Ukrainian community organizations in Sweden held in connection with the joint commemoration of Unity Day of Ukraine at the Embassy of Ukraine in Sweden.

== Honours and awards ==
- 2009: Third Class of the Order of Merit of Ukraine
