= Henrik Westman =

Swedish politician (1940–2019)

Henrik Westman (1 October 1940 – 15 August 2019) was a Swedish politician from Stockholm County who served in the Riksdag from 1998 to 2006 as a member of the Moderate Party.
