= Maud Ekendahl =

Swedish politician (born 1949)

Maud Ingeborg Ekendahl (born 16 July 1949) is a Swedish politician of the Moderate Party. She was a member of the Riksdag from 1995 to 2002 and then again from 2004 to 2006.
