= Staffan Danielsson =

Swedish Centre Party politician

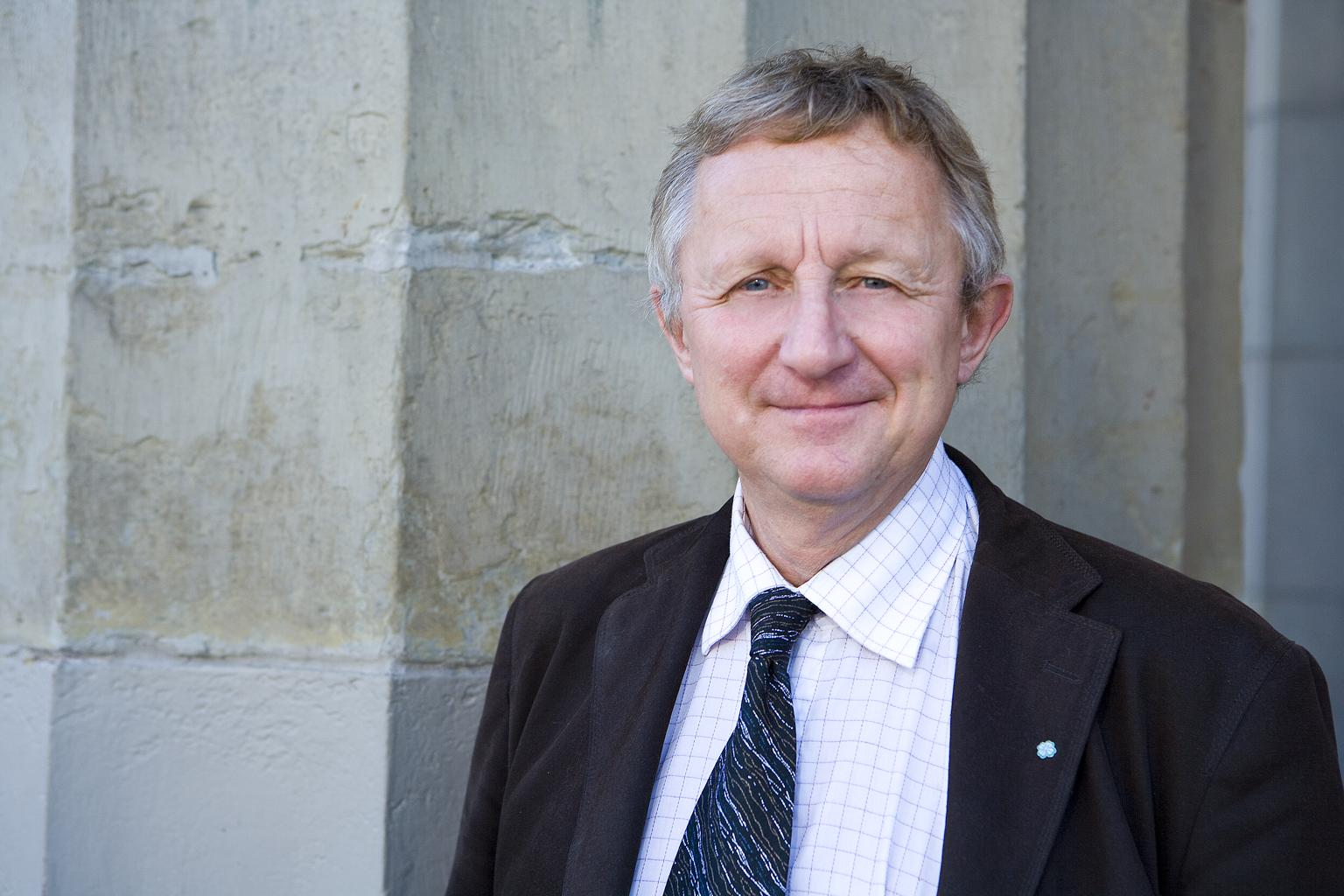
Staffan Danielsson

Staffan Danielsson (born 29 June 1947) is a Swedish Christian Democratic politician, who was a member of the Riksdag in 2004–2014 as well as 2015–2018 for the Centre Party. In 2021 he joined the Christian Democrats.
