= Erling Wälivaara =

Swedish politician (1941–2022)

Erling Wälivaara (1941–2022) was a Swedish Christian democratic politician, member of the Riksdag 1998–2006.
