= Ana Maria Narti =

Swedish writer and politician

Ana Maria Narti, born 1936 in Bucharest, Romania is a Swedish writer and politician.

== Life ==
Narti was born with a Russian mother and a Romanian father from Macedonia.

In 1970, Narti fled to Sweden as a refugee where she received political asylum. She is member of the Liberal People's Party and was a member of the Riksdag (parliament) from 1999 to 2006.

In 2019, she supported Erik Ullenhag, with the Liberal Party. When he was not elected, Narti, in turn, chose to left the party.
