= Britta Rådström =

Swedish politician (1954–2015)

Britta Rådström (1954 – 28 July 2015) was a Swedish Social Democratic politician. She has been a member of the Riksdag since 2004.

She should not be confused with her namesake, a psychology student who married Swedish author Pär Rådström.
