= Karin Thorborg =

Swedish politician (born 1948)

Karin Thorborg (born 1948) is a Swedish Left Party politician. She was a member of the Riksdag from 2002 until 2006.
