= Inger Jarl Beck =

Swedish politician (born 1948)

Inger Jarl Beck (born 1948) is a Swedish social democratic politician. She has been a member of the Riksdag since 2006. She was a substitute from 2002 to 2006.
