= Per Landgren =

Swedish politician (born 1958)

Per Landgren (born 1958) is a Swedish Christian Democratic politician, member of the Swedish parliament (Riksdag) 1998–2006. Landgren was a member of the financial committee of the Riksdag until 2002 and of the fiscal committee between 2002 and 2006. He is also pursuing a doctorate in History of ideas at University of Gothenburg.

Landgren questions the theory of evolution. He has edited an anthology on "science, evolution, creation, belief" and has written articles for the Swedish creationist magazine Genesis. In 2005 he sponsored a Riksdag bill to teach "biological questions of origin" in philosophy class instead of biology class.
