= Göran Lennmarker =

Swedish politician (born 1943)

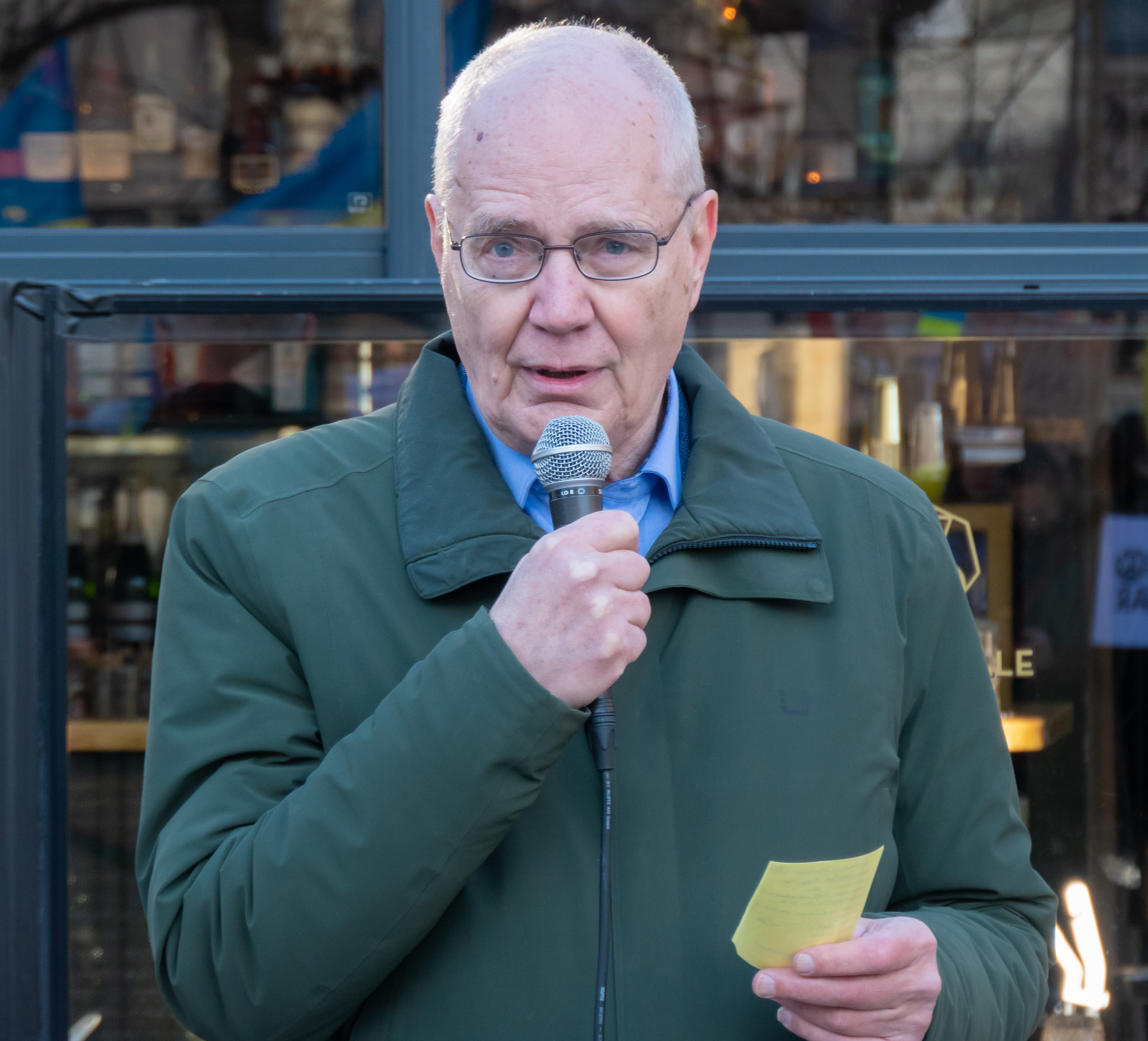
Göran Lennmarker in 2022

Rolf Göran Lennmarker (born 7 December 1943 in Norberg, Västmanland County) is a Swedish moderate politician who has been a member of the Riksdag from 1991 to 2010. From 2006 until 2010 he was the Chair of the Riksdag's Committee on Foreign Affairs. In 2006 he briefly also was Chair of the Committee on EU Affairs.

He is the former Chairman of SIPRI (Stockholm International Peace Research Institute)'s Governing Board and the chairman of the Jarl Hjalmarson Foundation.

He has been a member of the OSCE Parliamentary Assembly since 1995. He was elected President of the Assembly in 2006 and in 2007 and nominated President Emeritus in 2008. Lennmarker has also acted as the Assembly's Special Representative on the Nagorno Karabakh Conflict and on the conflicts on Georgia.

== Former Positions ==
Lennmarker served as a NATO Parliamentary Assembly observer from 1993 to 2002. Then from 2002 to 2003, he served as a member of the EU Convention on the Future of Europe. He chaired the Swedish Defence Commission in 2007.
