= Britt-Marie Lindkvist =

Swedish politician

Britt-Marie Lindkvist (born 1941) is a Swedish social democratic politician. She was a member of the Riksdag from 1998 to 2006.
