= Sven Brus =

Swedish politician (born 1941)

Sven Brus (born 1941) is a Swedish Christian democratic politician, member of the Riksdag 2000–2006.
