= Marita Aronson =

Swedish politician (born 1939)

Marita Aronson (born 10 May 1939 in Guddarp, Småland) is a Swedish Liberal People's Party politician. She was a member of the Riksdag from 2002 to 2006.
