= Else-Marie Lindgren =

Swedish politician (born 1949)

Else-Marie Lindgren (born 1949) is a Swedish Christian democratic politician. She has been a member of the Riksdag since 2002.

In February 2009 Lindgren controversially suggested the Prime Minister of Sweden should end speeches with the phrase "God bless Sweden" in the manner of the President of the United States.
