= Carl-Axel Roslund =

Swedish politician (born 1948)

Carl-Axel Roslund (born 4 November 1948) is a Swedish politician of the Moderate Party, member of the Riksdag 2002–2006.
