= Leif Björnlod =

Swedish politician (born 1939)

- Born: 1939 (age 86–87)
- Occupation: Former MP
- Political party: Green

Leif Björnlod (born 1939) is a Swedish Green Party politician, member of the Riksdag 2002–2006.
