= Rolf Olsson =

Swedish politician (1949–2007)

Rolf Olsson (1949–2007) was a Swedish Left Party politician, member of the Riksdag from 1998 to 2002 and again from 2003 to 2006. Olsson died suddenly on May 17, 2007, while hiking with friends.
