= Viviann Gerdin =

Swedish politician (born 1944)

Viviann Gerdin (born 1944) is a Swedish Centre Party politician. She was a member of the Riksdag from 1998 to 2006.
