= Gothenburg Municipality (Riksdag constituency) =

Constituency of the Riksdag, the national legislature of Sweden

- Göteborgs Kommun
- Constituency for the Riksdag
- Location of Gothenburg Municipality within Sweden
- Municipality: Gothenburg
- County: Västra Götaland
- Population: 613,278 (2025)
- Electorate: 463,162 (2026)
- Area: 465 km^{2} (2026)

Current constituency
- Created: 1970
- Seats: List (Note: Constituency seats only.): 18 (2026–present); 17 (2002–2026); 16 (1998–2001); 15 (1994–1998); 16 (1982–1994)); 17 (1970–1982)
- Member of the Riksdag: List: Leila Ali Elmi (MP); Emma Altenhammar (SD); Robert Andersson Hammarstrand (S); Ingrid Andreae (S); Daniel Bernmar (V); Johan Büser (S); Dennis Dioukarev (SD); Gustaf Göthberg (M); Pär Gustafsson (L); Marie-Louise Hänel Sandström (M); Johanna Holmdahl (KD); Mattias Jonsson (S); David Josefsson (M); Jennifer Merelaid Hankins (V); Emma Nohrén (MP); Rickard Nordin (C); Amalia Rud Pedersen (S); Frida Tånghag (V)
- Created from: Gothenburg City

Gothenburg Municipality (Swedish: Göteborgs Kommun) is one of the 29 multi-member constituencies of the Riksdag, the national legislature of Sweden. The constituency was established in 1970 when the Riksdag changed from a bicameral legislature to an unicameral legislature. It is conterminous with the municipality of Gothenburg. The constituency currently elects 18 of the 349 members of the Riksdag using the open party-list proportional representation electoral system. At the 2026 general election it had 463,162 registered electors.

== Electoral system ==
Gothenburg Municipality currently elects 18 of the 349 members of the Riksdag using the open party-list proportional representation electoral system. Constituency seats are allocated using the modified Sainte-Laguë method. Only parties that reach the 4% national threshold and parties that receive at least 12% of the vote in the constituency compete for constituency seats. Supplementary levelling seats may also be allocated at the constituency level to parties that reach the 4% national threshold.

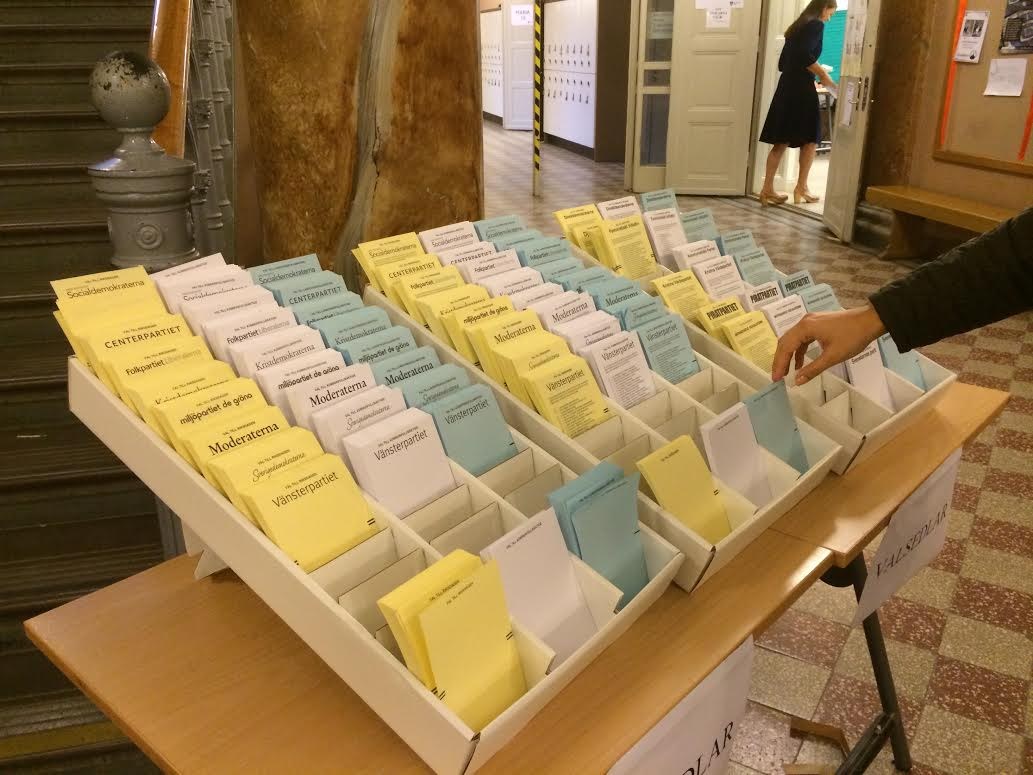
A selection of ballot papers available for voters at the 2014 general election in Stockholm - yellow for the Riksdag, blue for the regional council and white for the municipal council

Prior to 1997 voters could cast any ballot paper they wanted, though it had to contain the name of a party and the name of at least one candidate nominated by that party in the constituency. It was common for parties to hand out ballot papers with their name and list of candidates at the entrance of polling stations. Voters could delete the names of candidates or write-in the names of other candidates but in practice these options weren't used enough by voters to have any significant impact on the results and consequently elections operated as a closed system.

Since 1997, elections in Sweden follow the French model in having separate ballot papers for each party/list in a constituency. There are two ballot papers for each party - a party ballot paper (partivalsedel) with just the name of the party and a name ballot paper (namnvalsedel) with the name of the party and its list of candidates. There are also blank ballot papers (blank valsedel). Voters can initially pick as many ballot papers as they wish and then, in the secrecy of the voting booth, they select a single ballot paper of their choice. If they chose a name ballot paper they have the option of casting a preferential vote for one of their chosen party's candidates. If they chose a blank ballot paper they can write the name of any party including unregistered parties and, optionally, they can write the name of any person as their preferred candidate, even one that does not belong to their chosen party. They then place their chosen ballot paper in an envelope which is placed in the ballot box, discarding all other ballot papers they picked.

Seats won by each party/list in a constituency are allocated to its candidates in order of preference votes (a personal mandate), provided that the candidate has received at least 8% of votes cast for their party in the constituency (5% since January 2011). Any unfilled seats are then allocated to the party's remaining candidates in the order they appear on the party list (a party mandate).

== Election results ==
=== Summary ===
Election	Left V / VPK			Social Democrats S			Greens MP			Centre C			Liberals L / FP / F			Moderates M			Christian Democrats KD / KDS			Sweden Democrats SD		
Election	Votes	%	Seats	Votes	%	Seats	Votes	%	Seats	Votes	%	Seats	Votes	%	Seats	Votes	%	Seats	Votes	%	Seats	Votes	%	Seats
2026	57,509	15.12%	3	103,234	27.14%	5	34,440	9.05%	2	24,749	6.51%	1	22,580	5.94%	1	69,144	18.18%	3	18,463	4.85%	1	44,996	11.83%	2
2022	44,602	12.85%	2	95,980	27.65%	5	27,485	7.92%	1	20,343	5.86%	1	20,317	5.85%	1	64,157	18.48%	3	15,170	4.37%	1	50,889	14.66%	3
2018	48,946	14.00%	3	83,097	23.77%	4	24,286	6.95%	1	24,893	7.12%	1	25,337	7.25%	1	69,432	19.86%	4	19,283	5.52%	1	47,040	13.45%	2
2014	31,272	9.35%	2	79,167	23.68%	4	32,868	9.83%	2	12,696	3.80%	1	24,136	7.22%	1	79,768	23.86%	4	15,389	4.60%	1	32,240	9.64%	2
2010	27,246	8.53%	2	80,543	25.22%	5	34,205	10.71%	2	12,183	3.82%	0	26,829	8.40%	1	96,981	30.37%	5	19,484	6.10%	1	15,608	4.89%	1
2006	25,407	8.68%	2	84,693	28.93%	5	24,694	8.44%	1	13,076	4.47%	1	29,981	10.24%	2	78,679	26.88%	5	19,698	6.73%	1	7,455	2.55%	0
2002	32,405	11.87%	2	90,547	33.16%	6	17,657	6.47%	1	5,115	1.87%	0	49,187	18.01%	3	47,586	17.43%	3	23,519	8.61%	2	4,311	1.58%	0
1998	39,280	14.93%	3	77,241	29.35%	5	15,040	5.71%	1	4,375	1.66%	0	17,404	6.61%	1	67,998	25.84%	4	31,704	12.05%	2			
1994	23,817	8.76%	1	109,186	40.17%	6	16,202	5.96%	1	7,994	2.94%	0	26,137	9.62%	2	69,283	25.49%	4	11,804	4.34%	1			
1991	18,454	6.82%	1	89,658	33.16%	6	12,251	4.53%	0	8,508	3.15%	0	32,743	12.11%	2	67,603	25.00%	5	19,733	7.30%	1			
1988	24,523	9.02%	2	100,938	37.11%	6	21,341	7.85%	1	12,972	4.77%	1	46,299	17.02%	3	55,214	20.30%	3	7,060	2.60%	0			
1985	26,013	9.21%	1	113,270	40.09%	7	5,216	1.85%	0	14,242	5.04%	1	57,730	20.43%	3	62,325	22.06%	4	with C					
1982	28,710	10.04%	2	116,653	40.80%	7	5,794	2.03%	0	21,965	7.68%	1	27,800	9.72%	2	78,625	27.50%	4	3,912	1.37%	0			
1979	28,023	9.90%	2	106,274	37.56%	6				27,022	9.55%	2	45,800	16.19%	3	69,904	24.71%	4	2,454	0.87%	0			
1976	23,482	8.09%	1	112,916	38.89%	7				46,080	15.87%	3	52,827	18.19%	3	50,674	17.45%	3	2,583	0.89%	0			
1973	23,641	8.36%	1	108,075	38.22%	7				44,560	15.76%	3	53,368	18.87%	3	46,166	16.33%	3	2,977	1.05%	0			
1970	22,595	8.27%	1	103,595	37.90%	7				25,356	9.28%	2	87,304	31.94%	5	28,826	10.54%	2	2,681	0.98%	0			

(Excludes levelling seats. Figures in italics represent alliances/joint lists.)

=== Detailed ===
Party has received at least 4% of the vote nationally and is entitled to compete for constituency seats.

==== 2020s ====
===== 2026 =====
Results of the 2026 general election held on 13 September 2026:

Party		Votes per municipal electoral district											Total votes	%	Seats		
Party		Cent- rala His- ingen	Cent- rum	Nord- Östra Göte- borg	Norra His- ingen	Östra Cent- rum	Östra Göte- borg	Syd- Västra Göte- borg	Västra Cent- rum	Västra Göte- borg	Västra His- ingen	Upp- sam- lings- dist- rikt	Total votes	%	Con.	Lev.	Tot.
Swedish Social Democratic Party	S	10,033	10,001	9,183	10,151	11,293	9,290	10,338	11,134	7,265	8,765	5,781	103,234	27.14%	5	0	5
Moderate Party	M	6,155	10,348	1,759	5,009	8,888	2,368	9,726	6,492	7,913	6,529	3,957	69,144	18.18%	3	0	3
Left Party	V	5,168	4,829	7,433	4,118	4,891	6,882	5,229	8,353	2,869	3,990	3,747	57,509	15.12%	3	0	3
Sweden Democrats	SD	4,659	4,860	2,480	5,180	4,812	2,541	5,743	3,636	4,176	4,650	2,259	44,996	11.83%	2	0	2
Green Party	MP	3,038	4,600	1,017	1,464	5,317	2,285	3,163	7,521	2,583	1,329	2,123	34,440	9.05%	2	0	2
Centre Party	C	2,117	3,969	447	1,291	3,855	902	2,756	3,259	2,812	1,841	1,500	24,749	6.51%	1	0	1
Liberals	L	1,845	3,465	403	1,220	3,226	655	3,173	2,731	3,023	1,678	1,161	22,580	5.94%	1	0	1
Christian Democrats	KD	1,519	2,184	727	1,357	2,093	778	2,487	1,569	3,236	1,584	929	18,463	4.85%	1	0	1
Alternative for Sweden	AfS	148	211	52	120	189	98	185	149	112	104	83	1,451	0.38%	0	0	0
Örebro Party	ÖP	113	146	49	126	148	106	119	148	77	74	80	1,186	0.31%	0	0	0
Pirate Party	PP	84	73	22	51	67	54	81	75	31	25	41	604	0.16%	0	0	0
Christian Values Party	KrVP	26	40	75	36	48	33	57	32	76	19	27	469	0.12%	0	0	0
Ambition Sweden	AS	25	44	16	24	66	32	38	53	32	32	19	381	0.10%	0	0	0
Citizens' Coalition	MED	30	40	17	19	33	19	23	24	19	15	9	248	0.07%	0	0	0
Human Rights and Democracy	MoD	31	23	8	10	15	11	22	39	14	10	18	201	0.05%	0	0	0
United Voice	ER	20	22	7	9	10	26	17	40	12	12	3	178	0.05%	0	0	0
Communist Party of Sweden	SKP	13	13	12	9	16	20	15	28	6	5	8	145	0.04%	0	0	0
Nuance Party	PNy	17	3	34	19	1	18	4	3	8	26	9	142	0.04%	0	0	0
Direct Democrats	DD	7	5	1	7	7	4	8	15	6	2	9	71	0.02%	0	0	0
Communist Party	K	3	4	3	1	4	8	3	16	3	4	3	52	0.01%	0	0	0
RegleraAI.nu		0	3	2	3	10	2	1	4	3	4	2	34	0.01%	0	0	0
Volt Sweden	Volt	1	4	0	0	4	3	1	4	2	0	3	22	0.01%	0	0	0
Nordic Resistance Movement	NMR	4	1	0	3	1	1	2	4	0	1	0	17	0.00%	0	0	0
Donald Duck Party		3	0	0	0	4	0	1	0	1	2	3	14	0.00%	0	0	0
Unity	ENH	2	1	1	0	1	1	0	1	2	0	1	10	0.00%	0	0	0
Classical Liberal Party	KLP	0	5	0	0	2	0	0	0	1	0	1	9	0.00%	0	0	0
99 Black Balloons		2	0	0	0	2	1	1	2	0	0	0	8	0.00%	0	0	0
Anti-Authoritarian Action Party		5	0	0	0	0	0	0	2	0	0	1	8	0.00%	0	0	0
Turning Point Party	PV	0	1	2	0	1	0	1	0	1	0	1	7	0.00%	0	0	0
The Push Buttons	Kn	0	2	0	1	0	0	0	2	0	0	0	5	0.00%	0	0	0
A Good Sweden		0	0	1	0	0	0	0	1	0	1	1	4	0.00%	0	0	0
For the Good of All		0	0	2	0	0	0	0	0	0	2	0	4	0.00%	0	0	0
Animal Lovers' Party		0	0	0	0	0	1	0	0	0	1	1	3	0.00%	0	0	0
Independent Rural Party	LPo	0	0	0	2	1	0	0	0	0	0	0	3	0.00%	0	0	0
Jesus		0	1	1	0	1	0	0	0	0	0	0	3	0.00%	0	0	0
Responsible Intelligence in Politics		1	0	1	0	1	0	0	0	0	0	0	3	0.00%	0	0	0
United Sweden		0	0	0	0	0	0	0	1	2	0	0	3	0.00%	0	0	0
Willy Tiger		0	1	1	0	0	0	1	0	0	0	0	3	0.00%	0	0	0
AI Party		0	0	0	0	0	0	0	0	1	0	1	2	0.00%	0	0	0
Child Democrats		0	0	0	0	1	0	0	0	0	0	0	1	0.00%	0	0	0
Compass		0	0	0	0	0	0	0	1	0	0	0	1	0.00%	0	0	0
Forest People		0	0	0	1	0	0	0	0	0	0	0	1	0.00%	0	0	0
Free Wermland		0	0	0	0	0	0	0	0	0	0	1	1	0.00%	0	0	0
O		0	0	0	0	0	1	0	0	0	0	0	1	0.00%	0	0	0
Pensioners' Party		0	0	0	0	0	0	0	0	1	0	0	1	0.00%	0	0	0
Secular Humanist Party		0	0	0	0	0	1	0	0	0	0	0	1	0.00%	0	0	0
Social Liberals		0	1	0	0	0	0	0	0	0	0	0	1	0.00%	0	0	0
The Anarchists		0	0	0	0	0	0	0	1	0	0	0	1	0.00%	0	0	0
The Libertarians		0	0	0	0	0	0	0	0	1	0	0	1	0.00%	0	0	0
The Winds		1	0	0	0	0	0	0	0	0	0	0	1	0.00%	0	0	0
Vision Party		1	0	0	0	0	0	0	0	0	0	0	1	0.00%	0	0	0
Valid votes		35,071	44,900	23,756	30,231	45,008	26,141	43,195	45,340	34,288	30,705	21,782	380,417	100.00%	18	0	18
Blank votes		299	274	134	250	274	195	290	284	184	173	153	2,510	0.65%			
Rejected votes – unregistered parties		11	10	4	9	14	6	14	12	6	6	19	111	0.03%			
Rejected votes – other		16	16	12	24	21	4	13	26	17	13	54	216	0.06%			
Total polled		35,397	45,200	23,906	30,514	45,317	26,346	43,512	45,662	34,495	30,897	22,008	383,254	82.75%			
Registered electors		45,267	56,699	37,022	40,261	54,819	37,583	54,538	55,836	41,291	39,846		463,162				
Turnout		78.20%	79.72%	64.57%	75.79%	82.67%	70.10%	79.78%	81.78%	83.54%	77.54%		82.75%				

The following candidates were elected:

- Constituency seats (personal mandates) - Leila Ali Elmi (MP), 1,773 votes; Daniel Bernmar (V), 4,828 votes; Simona Mohamsson (L), 3,987 votes; and Rickard Nordin (C), 1,281 votes.
- Constituency seats (party mandates) - Robert Andersson Hammarstrand (S), 296 votes; Ingrid Andreae (S), 569 votes; Johan Büser (S), 829 votes; Dennis Dioukarev (SD), 175 votes; Gustaf Göthberg (M), 1,398 votes; Marie-Louise Hänel Sandström (M), 3,057 votes; Mattias Jonsson (S), 4,370 votes; David Josefsson (M), 782 votes; Elisabet Lann (KD), 199 votes; Jennifer Merelaid Hankins (V), 1,314 votes; Emma Nohrén (MP), 1,407 votes; Amalia Rud Pedersen (S), 2,590 votes; Frida Tånghag (V), 851 votes; and Emma Ylivallo Altenhammar (SD), 146 votes.

===== 2022 =====
Results of the 2022 general election held on 11 September 2022:

Party		Votes per municipal electoral district											Total votes	%	Seats		
Party		Cent- rala His- ingen	Cent- rum	Nord- Östra Göte- borg	Norra His- ingen	Östra Cent- rum	Östra Göte- borg	Syd- Västra Göte- borg	Västra Cent- rum	Västra Göte- borg	Västra His- ingen	Upp- sam- lings- dist- rikt	Total votes	%	Con.	Lev.	Tot.
Swedish Social Democratic Party	S	9,576	10,565	7,035	9,389	11,198	7,979	10,183	11,309	7,754	8,185	2,807	95,980	27.65%	5	0	5
Moderate Party	M	5,749	9,869	1,929	4,812	7,970	2,385	8,982	5,880	7,998	6,128	2,455	64,157	18.48%	3	0	3
Sweden Democrats	SD	5,232	5,656	2,900	5,869	5,289	2,930	6,698	4,400	4,956	5,400	1,559	50,889	14.66%	3	0	3
Left Party	V	4,557	4,791	3,472	2,712	4,743	4,711	4,321	9,057	2,234	2,501	1,503	44,602	12.85%	2	0	2
Green Party	MP	2,429	3,827	1,098	1,157	4,127	1,854	2,541	6,150	2,013	1,126	1,163	27,485	7.92%	1	1	2
Centre Party	C	1,812	3,164	797	1,275	2,996	1,010	2,351	2,406	2,186	1,483	863	20,343	5.86%	1	0	1
Liberals	L	1,750	3,680	308	1,060	2,960	640	2,620	2,573	2,604	1,332	790	20,317	5.85%	1	0	1
Christian Democrats	KD	1,210	1,862	617	1,168	1,684	740	2,102	1,237	2,761	1,332	457	15,170	4.37%	1	0	1
Nuance Party	PNy	260	35	1,515	371	51	576	163	33	167	703	71	3,945	1.14%	0	0	0
Alternative for Sweden	AfS	93	110	38	77	127	48	95	113	66	55	25	847	0.24%	0	0	0
Citizens' Coalition	MED	92	169	19	52	104	50	72	107	45	39	36	785	0.23%	0	0	0
Pirate Party	PP	70	108	19	42	79	76	59	80	22	47	26	628	0.18%	0	0	0
Human Rights and Democracy	MoD	31	62	23	25	62	32	59	59	33	23	8	417	0.12%	0	0	0
Christian Values Party	KrVP	18	27	35	14	42	27	36	30	49	20	15	313	0.09%	0	0	0
Feminist Initiative	FI	41	32	16	29	42	33	21	36	9	28	12	299	0.09%	0	0	0
The Push Buttons	Kn	29	24	9	12	36	15	32	34	19	24	20	254	0.07%	0	0	0
Climate Alliance	KA	22	18	7	7	22	12	14	36	12	4	8	162	0.05%	0	0	0
Direct Democrats	DD	15	21	4	9	19	7	19	11	6	9	2	122	0.04%	0	0	0
United Democratic Party		2	0	40	1	0	10	6	2	1	5	5	72	0.02%	0	0	0
Unity	ENH	3	9	3	2	6	3	4	15	7	1	5	58	0.02%	0	0	0
Basic Income Party	BASIP	5	4	3	1	9	6	7	11	2	3	1	52	0.01%	0	0	0
Communist Party of Sweden	SKP	4	6	4	3	4	6	6	8	4	3	2	50	0.01%	0	0	0
Nordic Resistance Movement	NMR	3	4	2	3	6	2	5	3	1	2	1	32	0.01%	0	0	0
Classical Liberal Party	KLP	4	7	0	1	5	1	3	1	3	3	0	28	0.01%	0	0	0
Hard Line Sweden		2	2	2	1	1	1	2	2	1	1	2	17	0.00%	0	0	0
Donald Duck Party		0	2	1	2	2	1	2	3	1	0	1	15	0.00%	0	0	0
Independent Rural Party	LPo	0	2	1	1	3	1	1	1	1	1	1	13	0.00%	0	0	0
Volt Sweden	Volt	2	1	0	0	2	1	0	2	0	1	2	11	0.00%	0	0	0
Freedom Party		1	0	0	0	0	1	0	4	0	1	0	7	0.00%	0	0	0
Turning Point Party	PV	1	1	2	0	0	0	1	1	1	0	0	7	0.00%	0	0	0
Socialist Welfare Party	S-V	1	0	0	0	0	3	1	0	1	0	0	6	0.00%	0	0	0
Electoral Cooperation Party		0	0	0	1	0	0	2	1	0	0	0	4	0.00%	0	0	0
Nix to the Six		0	1	0	0	0	0	0	0	3	0	0	4	0.00%	0	0	0
Evil Chicken Party	OKP	0	0	0	1	0	0	0	1	0	0	0	2	0.00%	0	0	0
Swexit Party		0	0	1	0	0	0	0	0	1	0	0	2	0.00%	0	0	0
European Radical Reflection – A European Dream Party	ERR	0	0	0	0	0	1	0	0	0	0	0	1	0.00%	0	0	0
European Workers Party	EAP	0	0	0	0	0	0	0	0	0	1	0	1	0.00%	0	0	0
Neotechnocrats		0	0	0	0	1	0	0	0	0	0	0	1	0.00%	0	0	0
Now That Will Be Enough		0	0	0	0	0	0	0	1	0	0	0	1	0.00%	0	0	0
Political Shift		0	0	0	1	0	0	0	0	0	0	0	1	0.00%	0	0	0
The Least Bad Party		0	0	0	1	0	0	0	0	0	0	0	1	0.00%	0	0	0
Valid votes		33,014	44,059	19,900	28,099	41,590	23,162	40,408	43,607	32,961	28,461	11,840	347,101	100.00%	17	1	18
Blank votes													3,032	0.87%			
Rejected votes – unregistered parties													143	0.04%			
Rejected votes – other													238	0.07%			
Total polled													350,514	80.71%			
Registered electors													434,273				

The following candidates were elected:

- Constituency seats (personal mandates) - Leila Ali Elmi (MP), 1,616 votes; and Robert Hannah (L), 1,092 votes.
- Constituency seats (party mandates) - Magnus Berntsson (KD), 157 votes; Johan Büser (S), 949 votes; Gunilla Carlsson (S), 1,000 votes; Dzenan Cisija (S), 1,487 votes; Dennis Dioukarev (SD), 123 votes; Gustaf Göthberg (M), 555 votes; Tony Haddou (V), 960 votes; Marie-Louise Hänel Sandström (M), 2,867 votes; Mattias Jonsson (S), 2,920 votes; David Josefsson (M), 1,031 votes; Maj Karlsson (V), 1,988 votes; Rickard Nordin (C), 267 votes; Amalia Rud Pedersen (S), 1,769 votes; Jimmy Ståhl (SD), 162 votes; and Björn Tidland (SD), 23 votes.
- Levelling seats (party mandates) - Emma Nohrén (MP), 1,169 votes.

Permanent substitutions:

- Robert Hannah (L) resigned on 18 February 2025 and was replaced by Helene Odenjung (L) on the same day.

==== 2010s ====
===== 2018 =====
Results of the 2018 general election held on 9 September 2018:

Party		Votes per municipal electoral district											Total votes	%	Seats		
Party		Ange- red	Askim- Frö- lunda- Högs- bo	Cent- rum	Lund- by	Maj- orna- Linné	Norra His- ingen	Örg- ryte- Här- landa	Östra Göte- borg	Västra Göte- borg	Västra His- ingen	Upp- sam- lings- dist- rikt	Total votes	%	Con.	Lev.	Tot.
Swedish Social Democratic Party	S	8,862	7,963	7,661	8,195	8,756	9,248	8,058	8,322	6,009	7,348	2,675	83,097	23.77%	4	0	4
Moderate Party	M	2,142	9,244	10,711	6,244	6,741	5,374	8,515	2,560	8,523	6,486	2,892	69,432	19.86%	4	0	4
Left Party	V	3,160	4,195	5,376	5,021	11,078	3,005	5,708	4,412	2,382	2,862	1,747	48,946	14.00%	3	0	3
Sweden Democrats	SD	2,951	5,828	5,015	4,650	4,152	5,398	4,869	2,910	4,532	5,098	1,637	47,040	13.45%	2	0	2
Liberals	L	643	3,071	4,041	2,292	3,144	1,602	3,523	934	3,223	1,893	971	25,337	7.25%	1	1	2
Centre Party	C	778	2,573	4,073	2,456	3,057	1,529	3,717	1,035	2,459	2,109	1,107	24,893	7.12%	1	0	1
Green Party	MP	1,525	1,996	3,446	2,262	4,564	1,158	3,532	1,693	1,652	1,223	1,235	24,286	6.95%	1	1	2
Christian Democrats	KD	801	2,481	2,534	1,578	1,727	1,490	2,226	839	3,493	1,436	678	19,283	5.52%	1	0	1
Feminist Initiative	FI	87	245	390	305	609	146	401	297	137	148	166	2,931	0.84%	0	0	0
Alternative for Sweden	AfS	45	122	171	115	151	111	153	78	89	92	60	1,187	0.34%	0	0	0
Citizens' Coalition	MED	29	61	190	105	103	58	119	40	62	46	54	867	0.25%	0	0	0
Pirate Party	PP	21	51	97	67	71	48	67	67	18	54	30	591	0.17%	0	0	0
Animal Party	DjuP	28	48	65	44	48	46	38	45	30	33	10	435	0.12%	0	0	0
Direct Democrats	DD	16	46	55	36	51	39	39	31	12	35	15	375	0.11%	0	0	0
Unity	ENH	7	17	27	28	48	14	24	16	12	14	6	213	0.06%	0	0	0
Christian Values Party	KrVP	35	32	19	9	6	19	21	20	26	9	6	202	0.06%	0	0	0
Nordic Resistance Movement	NMR	6	14	13	16	11	17	19	3	5	12	5	121	0.03%	0	0	0
Classical Liberal Party	KLP	2	15	22	16	12	5	10	7	9	9	5	112	0.03%	0	0	0
Basic Income Party	BASIP	2	10	14	10	24	11	14	2	6	4	7	104	0.03%	0	0	0
Communist Party of Sweden	SKP	9	8	3	5	3	12	4	10	1	10	0	65	0.02%	0	0	0
Initiative	INI	3	16	10	4	7	1	5	6	2	2	3	59	0.02%	0	0	0
Independent Rural Party	LPo	2	0	3	2	5	2	1	0	1	2	2	20	0.01%	0	0	0
European Workers Party	EAP	0	0	0	0	2	0	0	0	0	1	1	4	0.00%	0	0	0
Security Party	TRP	0	0	0	0	0	1	0	0	0	0	1	2	0.00%	0	0	0
NY Reform		0	0	0	0	0	0	0	0	0	1	0	1	0.00%	0	0	0
Parties not on the ballot		1	3	4	7	5	3	7	2	5	2	3	42	0.01%	0	0	0
Valid votes		21,155	38,039	43,940	33,467	44,375	29,337	41,070	23,329	32,688	28,929	13,316	349,645	100.00%	17	2	19
Blank votes		140	265	286	314	334	303	269	192	221	225	87	2,636	0.75%			
Rejected votes – unregistered parties		6	27	16	27	32	13	20	8	17	10	7	183	0.05%			
Rejected votes – other		14	16	22	19	20	19	14	24	10	13	25	196	0.06%			
Total polled		21,315	38,347	44,264	33,827	44,761	29,672	41,373	23,553	32,936	29,177	13,435	352,660	84.28%			
Registered electors		31,741	45,584	52,654	41,094	52,620	36,754	48,475	32,913	39,564	37,026		418,425				
Turnout		67.15%	84.12%	84.07%	82.32%	85.06%	80.73%	85.35%	71.56%	83.25%	78.80%		84.28%				

The following candidates were elected:

- Constituency seats (personal mandates) - Leila Ali Elmi (MP), 1,467 votes; Robert Hannah (L), 1,954 votes; Lars Hjälmered (M), 3,571 votes; Anna Johansson (S), 4,646 votes; and Maj Karlsson (V), 2,929 votes.
- Constituency seats (party mandates) - Johan Büser (S), 675 votes; Gunilla Carlsson (S), 1,358 votes; Alexander Christiansson (SD), 58 votes; Dennis Dioukarev (SD), 151 votes; Tony Haddou (V), 519 votes; Hampus Hagman (KD), 126 votes; Marie-Louise Hänel Sandström (M), 1,628 votes; Mattias Jonsson (S), 1,737 votes; David Josefsson (M), 391 votes; Rickard Nordin (C), 340 votes; Yasmine Posio (V), 1,096 votes; and Hans Rothenberg (M), 517 votes.
- Levelling seats (party mandates) - Maria Nilsson (L), 435 votes; and Anna Sibinska (MP), 512 votes.

===== 2014 =====
Results of the 2014 general election held on 14 September 2014:

Party		Votes per municipal electoral district				Total votes	%	Seats		
Party		Cent- rum	His- ingen	Öster	Väster	Total votes	%	Con.	Lev.	Tot.
Moderate Party	M	23,150	20,211	12,356	24,051	79,768	23.86%	4	0	4
Swedish Social Democratic Party	S	13,371	25,730	22,971	17,095	79,167	23.68%	4	0	4
Green Party	MP	10,594	7,228	7,274	7,772	32,868	9.83%	2	0	2
Sweden Democrats	SD	6,296	10,856	6,781	8,307	32,240	9.64%	2	0	2
Left Party	V	8,610	7,644	7,523	7,495	31,272	9.35%	2	0	2
Liberal People's Party	FP	7,292	5,294	4,178	7,372	24,136	7.22%	1	0	1
Feminist Initiative	FI	8,029	3,932	4,185	5,515	21,661	6.48%	0	0	0
Christian Democrats	KD	3,730	3,336	2,599	5,724	15,389	4.60%	1	0	1
Centre Party	C	3,983	3,047	2,263	3,403	12,696	3.80%	1	0	1
Pirate Party	PP	567	547	420	401	1,935	0.58%	0	0	0
Crossroads		165	402	176	223	966	0.29%	0	0	0
Animal Party	DjuP	109	120	98	96	423	0.13%	0	0	0
Unity	ENH	112	82	89	90	373	0.11%	0	0	0
Socialist Justice Party	RS	10	40	261	18	329	0.10%	0	0	0
Christian Values Party	KrVP	54	47	111	44	256	0.08%	0	0	0
Party of the Swedes	SVP	46	92	56	62	256	0.08%	0	0	0
Classical Liberal Party	KLP	42	35	21	28	126	0.04%	0	0	0
Direct Democrats	DD	38	31	23	23	115	0.03%	0	0	0
Communist Party of Sweden	SKP	3	10	20	7	40	0.01%	0	0	0
Health Party		9	5	3	5	22	0.01%	0	0	0
Peace Democrats	FD	0	3	10	8	21	0.01%	0	0	0
Independent Rural Party	LPo	0	3	5	3	11	0.00%	0	0	0
Swedish Senior Citizen Interest Party	SPI	3	2	1	2	8	0.00%	0	0	0
Progressive Party		0	4	1	0	5	0.00%	0	0	0
European Workers Party	EAP	1	0	0	1	2	0.00%	0	0	0
Parties not on the ballot		60	36	57	56	209	0.06%	0	0	0
Valid votes		86,274	88,737	71,482	87,801	334,294	100.00%	17	0	17
Blank votes		580	782	565	618	2,545	0.76%			
Rejected votes – other		21	34	29	33	117	0.03%			
Total polled		86,875	89,553	72,076	88,452	336,956	82.82%			
Registered electors		99,583	109,630	95,113	102,525	406,851				
Turnout		87.24%	81.69%	75.78%	86.27%	82.82%				

The following candidates were elected:

- Constituency seats (personal mandates) - Robert Hannah (FP), 1,716 votes; Anna Johansson (S), 6,359 votes; Hans Linde (V), 1,721 votes; Lise Nordin (MP), 2,430 votes.
- Constituency seats (party mandates) - Johan Büser (S), 566 votes; Gunilla Carlsson (S), 1,174 votes; Lars Hjälmered (M), 3,370 votes; Mattias Jonsson (S), 1,653 votes; Maj Karlsson (V), 885 votes; Martin Kinnunen (SD), 3 votes; Cecilia Magnusson (M), 3,098 votes; Aron Modig (KD), 629 votes; Valter Mutt (MP), 270 votes; Rickard Nordin (C), 322 votes; Hans Rothenberg (M), 655 votes; Jimmy Ståhl (SD), 60 votes; and Lisbeth Sundén Andersson (M), 321 votes.

Permanent substitutions:

- Hans Linde (V) resigned on 7 June 2017 and was replaced by Yasmine Posio (V) on the same day.

===== 2010 =====
Results of the 2010 general election held on 19 September 2010:

Party		Votes per municipal electoral district				Total votes	%	Seats		
Party		Cent- rum	His- ingen	Öster	Väster	Total votes	%	Con.	Lev.	Tot.
Moderate Party	M	28,134	24,198	15,850	28,799	96,981	30.37%	5	0	5
Swedish Social Democratic Party	S	13,294	25,303	24,294	17,652	80,543	25.22%	5	0	5
Green Party	MP	11,584	6,830	7,309	8,482	34,205	10.71%	2	0	2
Left Party	V	7,448	6,650	6,539	6,609	27,246	8.53%	2	0	2
Liberal People's Party	FP	7,993	6,401	4,746	7,689	26,829	8.40%	1	0	1
Christian Democrats	KD	4,601	3,945	3,643	7,295	19,484	6.10%	1	0	1
Sweden Democrats	SD	2,795	5,281	3,635	3,897	15,608	4.89%	1	0	1
Centre Party	C	4,198	2,620	2,070	3,295	12,183	3.82%	0	1	1
Feminist Initiative	FI	968	519	563	711	2,761	0.86%	0	0	0
Pirate Party	PP	728	749	598	553	2,628	0.82%	0	0	0
Socialist Justice Party	RS	23	81	251	33	388	0.12%	0	0	0
Classical Liberal Party	KLP	30	16	14	14	74	0.02%	0	0	0
National Democrats	ND	6	17	13	12	48	0.02%	0	0	0
Freedom Party		3	9	20	13	45	0.01%	0	0	0
Unity	ENH	8	8	4	7	27	0.01%	0	0	0
Communist Party of Sweden	SKP	2	4	2	13	21	0.01%	0	0	0
Active Democracy		5	4	2	4	15	0.00%	0	0	0
Party of the Swedes	SVP	1	4	2	5	12	0.00%	0	0	0
Swedish Senior Citizen Interest Party	SPI	4	4	0	4	12	0.00%	0	0	0
European Workers Party	EAP	3	2	2	3	10	0.00%	0	0	0
Spirits Party		1	3	2	1	7	0.00%	0	0	0
Health Care Party	Sjvåp	0	3	1	1	5	0.00%	0	0	0
Norrland Coalition Party	NorrS	0	1	0	0	1	0.00%	0	0	0
Rural Democrats		0	0	1	0	1	0.00%	0	0	0
Parties not on the ballot		43	44	33	48	168	0.05%	0	0	0
Valid votes		81,872	82,696	69,594	85,140	319,302	100.00%	17	1	18
Blank votes		759	890	665	730	3,044	0.94%			
Rejected votes – other		28	27	28	29	112	0.03%			
Total polled		82,659	83,613	70,287	85,899	322,458	82.72%			
Registered electors		96,030	102,927	91,328	99,536	389,821				
Turnout		86.08%	81.24%	76.96%	86.30%	82.72%				

The following candidates were elected:

- Constituency seats (personal mandates) - Annelie Enochson (KD), 3,208 votes; and Leif Pagrotsky (S), 12,413 votes.
- Constituency seats (party mandates) - Gunilla Carlsson (S), 1,943 votes; Eva Flyborg (FP), 1,533 votes; Susanna Haby (M), 2,225 votes; Shadiye Heydari (S), 1,964 votes; Lars Hjälmered (M), 2,502 votes; Lars Johansson (S), 687 votes; Mattias Jonsson (S), 710 votes; Hans Linde (V), 1,628 votes; Cecilia Magnusson (M), 5,127 votes; Valter Mutt (MP), 602 votes; Lise Nordin (MP), 2,469 votes; Eva Olofsson (V), 732 votes; Hans Rothenberg (M), 738 votes; Sven-Olof Sällström (SD), 7 votes; and Abdirizak Waberi (M), 772 votes.
- Levelling seats (party mandates) - Anders Flanking (C), 592 votes.

Permanent substitutions:

- Leif Pagrotsky (S) resigned on 3 October 2012 and was replaced by Cecilia Dalman Eek (S) on 4 October 2012.

==== 2000s ====
===== 2006 =====
Results of the 2006 general election held on 17 September 2006:

Party		Votes per municipal electoral district				Total votes	%	Seats		
Party		Cent- rum (Göte- borg3)	His- ingen (Göte- borg1)	Öster (Göte- borg2)	Väster (Göte- borg4)	Total votes	%	Con.	Lev.	Tot.
Swedish Social Democratic Party	S	14,587	27,335	23,270	19,501	84,693	28.93%	5	0	5
Moderate Party	M	24,935	16,690	12,726	24,328	78,679	26.88%	5	0	5
Liberal People's Party	FP	9,305	6,523	5,524	8,629	29,981	10.24%	2	0	2
Left Party	V	6,578	6,188	6,544	6,097	25,407	8.68%	2	0	2
Green Party	MP	8,446	4,461	5,693	6,094	24,694	8.44%	1	1	2
Christian Democrats	KD	4,031	4,294	3,841	7,532	19,698	6.73%	1	0	1
Centre Party	C	4,228	2,935	2,397	3,516	13,076	4.47%	1	0	1
Sweden Democrats	SD	1,201	2,559	1,801	1,894	7,455	2.55%	0	0	0
Feminist Initiative	FI	1,289	664	829	919	3,701	1.26%	0	0	0
Pirate Party	PP	633	686	666	539	2,524	0.86%	0	0	0
June List		210	246	227	304	987	0.34%	0	0	0
Health Care Party	Sjvåp	76	197	178	146	597	0.20%	0	0	0
Swedish Senior Citizen Interest Party	SPI	103	162	129	179	573	0.20%	0	0	0
Unity	ENH	43	59	33	43	178	0.06%	0	0	0
National Democrats	ND	21	56	24	35	136	0.05%	0	0	0
Socialist Justice Party	RS	11	22	46	5	84	0.03%	0	0	0
National Socialist Front		7	10	11	12	40	0.01%	0	0	0
New Future	NYF	3	17	7	13	40	0.01%	0	0	0
People's Will		10	2	4	5	21	0.01%	0	0	0
Classical Liberal Party	KLP	5	1	8	0	14	0.00%	0	0	0
Active Democracy		6	3	2	1	12	0.00%	0	0	0
The Communists	KOMM	2	4	2	3	11	0.00%	0	0	0
Unique Party		1	2	3	0	6	0.00%	0	0	0
Kvinnokraft		2	0	0	1	3	0.00%	0	0	0
Partiet.se		0	0	1	2	3	0.00%	0	0	0
European Workers Party	EAP	0	1	1	0	2	0.00%	0	0	0
Freedom of the Justice Party		1	1	0	0	2	0.00%	0	0	0
Nordic Union		0	1	1	0	2	0.00%	0	0	0
Other parties		38	27	25	17	107	0.04%	0	0	0
Valid votes		75,772	73,146	63,993	79,815	292,726	100.00%	17	1	18
Blank votes		1,193	1,249	1,006	1,019	4,467	1.50%			
Rejected votes – other		42	41	33	32	148	0.05%			
Total polled		77,007	74,436	65,032	80,866	297,341	79.54%			
Registered electors		92,805	95,716	88,579	96,736	373,836				
Turnout		82.98%	77.77%	73.42%	83.59%	79.54%				

The following candidates were elected:

- Constituency seats (personal mandates) - Annelie Enochson (KD), 1,752 votes; and Leif Pagrotsky (S), 13,204 votes.
- Constituency seats (party mandates) - Claes-Göran Brandin (S), 436 votes; Gunilla Carlsson (S), 848 votes; Eva Flyborg (FP), 1,804 votes; Lisbeth Grönfeldt Bergman (M), 579 votes; Lars Hjälmered (M), 1,624 votes; Lars Johansson (S), 452 votes; Göran Lindblad (M), 1,292 votes; Hans Linde (V), 588 votes; Karla López (MP), 1,344 votes; Cecilia Magnusson (M), 4,831 votes; Eva Olofsson (V), 1,160 votes; Hans Rothenberg (M), 790 votes; Eva Selin Lindgren (C), 1,022 votes; Cecilia Wigström (FP), 1,899 votes; and Siw Wittgren-Ahl (S), 668 votes.
- Levelling seats (party mandates) - Max Andersson (MP), 841 votes.

Permanent substitutions:

- Karla López (MP) resigned on 13 November 2007 and was replaced by Lage Rahm (MP) on 14 November 2007.

===== 2002 =====
Results of the 2002 general election held on 15 September 2002:

Party		Votes per municipal electoral district					Total votes	%	Seats		
Party		Cent- rum (Göte- borg3)	His- ingen (Göte- borg1)	Öster (Göte- borg2)	Väster (Göte- borg4)	Not count- ed	Total votes	%	Con.	Lev.	Tot.
Swedish Social Democratic Party	S	17,099	28,070	22,998	21,495	885	90,547	33.16%	6	0	6
Liberal People's Party	FP	16,067	9,084	8,669	14,614	753	49,187	18.01%	3	1	4
Moderate Party	M	14,676	9,181	8,035	14,734	960	47,586	17.43%	3	0	3
Left Party	V	8,975	7,878	7,909	7,187	456	32,405	11.87%	2	0	2
Christian Democrats	KD	5,070	4,898	4,628	8,617	306	23,519	8.61%	2	0	2
Green Party	MP	6,074	3,164	3,814	4,214	391	17,657	6.47%	1	0	1
Centre Party	C	1,419	1,341	1,057	1,221	77	5,115	1.87%	0	0	0
Sweden Democrats	SD	738	1,364	1,092	1,088	29	4,311	1.58%	0	0	0
Swedish Senior Citizen Interest Party	SPI	177	324	212	446	15	1,174	0.43%	0	0	0
Socialist Party	SOC.P	101	92	142	93	8	436	0.16%	0	0	0
New Future	NYF	40	62	49	67	5	223	0.08%	0	0	0
The Communists	KOMM	9	37	45	24	0	115	0.04%	0	0	0
Norrbotten Party	NBP	2	5	3	12	1	23	0.01%	0	0	0
Unity	ENH	10	2	4	5	1	22	0.01%	0	0	0
Communist League	KommF	3	1	8	0	0	12	0.00%	0	0	0
European Workers Party	EAP	1	2	5	2	0	10	0.00%	0	0	0
Socialist Justice Party	RS	0	2	0	2	1	5	0.00%	0	0	0
Other parties		142	211	141	200	15	709	0.26%	0	0	0
Valid votes		70,603	65,718	58,811	74,021	3,903	273,056	100.00%	17	1	18
Rejected votes		1,180	1,208	911	1,035	99	4,433	1.60%			
Total polled		71,783	66,926	59,722	75,056	4,002	277,489	77.54%			
Registered electors		91,238	89,615	83,883	93,140		357,876				
Turnout		78.68%	74.68%	71.20%	80.58%		77.54%				

The following candidates were elected:

- Constituency seats (personal mandates) - Eva Flyborg (FP), 5,742 votes; Johan Lönnroth (V), 3,646 votes; and Leif Pagrotsky (S), 13,552 votes.
- Constituency seats (party mandates) - Erling Bager (FP), 758 votes; Claes-Göran Brandin (S), 689 votes; Gunilla Carlsson (S), 944 votes; Marianne Carlström (S), 1,190 votes; Annelie Enochson (KD), 1,734 votes; Berit Jóhannesson (V), 1,079 votes; Lars Johansson (S), 445 votes; Per Landgren (KD), 1,804 votes; Göran Lindblad (M), 1,505 votes; Cecilia Magnusson (M), 3,325 votes; Cecilia Nilsson (FP), 2,529 votes; Claes Roxbergh (MP), 1,266 votes; Anita Sidén (M), 2,268 votes; and Siw Wittgren-Ahl (S), 577 votes.
- Levelling seats (party mandates) - Axel Darvik (FP), 600 votes.

Permanent substitutions:

- Johan Lönnroth (V) resigned on 6 February 2003 and was replaced by Rolf Olsson (V) on the same day.

==== 1990s ====
===== 1998 =====
Results of the 1998 general election held on 20 September 1998:

Party		Votes per parish																																					Total votes	%	Seats		
Party		Älvs -borg	Ange -red	Anne -dal	Askim	Backa	Bäcke -bol	Bergs -jön	Bergum	Biskops -gården	Björ -kekärr	Björ -landa	Brämare -gården	Brunns -bo	Dom -kyrko -förs	Gunna -red	Haga	Här -landa	Högs -bo	Johanne -berg	Karl Johan	Korte -dala	Lund -by	Mast -hugg	Näset	Nylöse	Örg -ryte	Oskar Fred -rik	Rödbo	Säve	St. Pauli	Styrsö	Tors -landa	Tuve	Tynne -red	Vasa	Västra Frö -lunda	Postal votes	Total votes	%	Con.	Lev.	Tot.
Swedish Social Democratic Party	S	2,134	2,426	2,284	2,059	1,743	2,078	1,856	647	4,139	1,227	899	2,400	1,187	1,264	2,944	702	3,063	3,980	2,294	2,823	3,299	4,350	1,809	1,202	2,247	1,454	1,485	127	2,970	2,569	451	2,496	2,190	3,622	1,091	3,029	701	77,241	29.35%	5	0	5
Moderate Party	M	4,850	742	3,467	6,198	735	782	482	253	932	919	737	1,171	520	2,746	692	1,094	2,433	1,804	4,666	2,208	701	2,164	1,494	1,699	1,038	4,229	2,172	119	1,149	2,671	493	2,156	1,182	2,235	4,251	1,127	1,687	67,998	25.84%	4	1	5
Left Party	V	739	1,013	1,438	654	654	809	788	261	1,815	584	375	1,380	549	795	1,514	682	1,635	1,714	1,244	2,864	1,641	1,974	2,329	419	1,076	697	1,720	52	935	1,546	288	660	768	1,244	736	1,167	521	39,280	14.93%	3	0	3
Christian Democrats	KD	2,357	635	1,459	2,203	470	470	379	220	591	679	339	627	340	783	443	320	1,154	1,315	1,545	1,032	530	1,116	675	861	647	1,373	695	58	737	1,073	935	1,007	730	1,592	1,160	810	344	31,704	12.05%	2	0	2
Liberal People's Party	FP	1,071	163	1,143	1,157	158	190	135	45	222	342	148	354	109	658	183	352	706	555	1,222	737	199	472	536	392	299	983	644	10	216	724	221	514	303	634	937	305	365	17,404	6.61%	1	0	1
Green Party	MP	488	284	814	469	135	152	202	86	343	330	117	457	122	396	345	275	748	570	815	1,190	336	507	942	175	376	508	679	21	235	700	156	319	243	411	467	264	363	15,040	5.71%	1	0	1
Centre Party	C	187	74	243	179	63	42	36	86	75	76	122	77	52	110	95	57	195	140	274	193	70	157	154	68	81	137	144	23	170	194	26	229	127	110	140	84	85	4,375	1.66%	0	0	0
Other parties		326	236	384	301	170	234	242	122	516	165	120	405	169	175	340	78	308	694	313	360	374	552	227	166	264	269	170	1	254	296	45	226	279	448	122	708	80	10,139	3.85%	0	0	0
Valid votes		12,152	5,573	11,232	13,220	4,128	4,757	4,120	1,720	8,633	4,322	2,857	6,871	3,048	6,927	6,556	3,560	10,242	10,772	12,373	11,407	7,150	11,292	8,166	4,982	6,028	9,650	7,709	411	6,666	9,773	2,615	7,607	5,822	10,296	8,904	7,494	4,146	263,181	100.00%	16	1	17
Rejected votes		132	99	217	163	71	99	87	44	160	66	70	175	69	162	151	89	245	228	255	292	160	268	231	91	108	147	197	7	170	251	50	165	131	199	186	119	114	5,468	2.04%			
Total polled		12,284	5,672	11,449	13,383	4,199	4,856	4,207	1,764	8,793	4,388	2,927	7,046	3,117	7,089	6,707	3,649	10,487	11,000	12,628	11,699	7,310	11,560	8,397	5,073	6,136	9,797	7,906	418	6,836	10,024	2,665	7,772	5,953	10,495	9,090	7,613	4,260	268,649	78.92%			
Registered electors		13,802	8,718	14,232	15,626	5,598	6,113	6,714	2,062	13,407	5,383	3,396	9,781	4,023	9,262	10,377	4,538	13,303	14,144	16,117	15,037	10,295	15,800	10,655	5,724	8,150	11,905	10,243	540	8,317	12,901	3,286	8,884	7,231	13,285	11,498	10,055		340,402				
Turnout		89.00%	65.06%	80.45%	85.65%	75.01%	79.44%	62.66%	85.55%	65.59%	81.52%	86.19%	72.04%	77.48%	76.54%	64.63%	80.41%	78.83%	77.77%	78.35%	77.80%	71.01%	73.16%	78.81%	88.63%	75.29%	82.29%	77.18%	77.41%	82.19%	77.70%	81.10%	87.48%	82.33%	79.00%	79.06%	75.71%		78.92%				

The following candidates were elected:

- Constituency seats (personal mandates) - Eva Flyborg (FP), 1,980 votes; Sven Hulterström (S), 11,142 votes; and Johan Lönnroth (V), 5,834 votes.
- Constituency seats (party mandates) - Kia Andreasson (MP), 1,073 votes; Jan Bergqvist (S), 704 votes; Claes-Göran Brandin (S), 658 votes; Gunilla Carlsson (S), 1,853 votes; Tom Heyman (M), 4,505 votes; Berit Jóhannesson (V), 1,806 votes; Per Landgren (KD), 556 votes; Göran Lindblad (M), 1,040 votes; Cecilia Magnusson (M), 3,741 votes; Ingrid Näslund (KD), 567 votes; Rolf Olsson (V), 337 votes; Anita Sidén (M), 823 votes; and Siw Wittgren-Ahl (S), 693 votes.
- Levelling seats (party mandates) - Lennart Fridén (M), 571 votes.

Permanent substitutions:

- Ingrid Näslund (KD) resigned on 31 January 2000 and was replaced by Annelie Enochson (KD) on 1 February 2000.

===== 1994 =====
Results of the 1994 general election held on 18 September 1994:

Party		Votes per parish																																					Total votes	%	Seats		
Party		Älvs -borg	Ange -red	Anne -dal	Askim	Backa	Bäcke -bol	Bergs -jön	Bergum	Biskops -gården	Björ -kekärr	Björ -landa	Brämare -gården	Brunns -bo	Dom -kyrko -förs	Gunna -red	Haga	Här -landa	Högs -bo	Johanne -berg	Karl Johan	Korte -dala	Lund -by	Mast -hugg	Näset	Nylöse	Örg -ryte	Oskar Fred -rik	Rödbo	Säve	St. Pauli	Styrsö	Tors -landa	Tuve	Tynne -red	Vasa	Västra Frö -lunda	Postal votes	Total votes	%	Con.	Lev.	Tot.
Swedish Social Democratic Party	S	2,870	3,609	3,195	2,918	2,453	2,951	3,037	742	5,723	1,780	1,074	3,418	1,812	1,718	4,538	996	4,106	6,060	3,055	4,417	4,790	6,054	2,814	1,680	3,130	2,106	2,122	163	3,652	3,648	666	3,119	2,985	4,942	1,452	4,640	751	109,186	40.17%	6	1	7
Moderate Party	M	5,018	911	3,362	6,395	799	778	565	260	902	1,043	632	1,293	586	2,943	808	1,050	2,430	1,964	4,552	2,273	875	2,181	1,444	1,649	1,193	4,474	2,074	125	1,230	2,594	603	1,975	1,428	2,372	4,159	1,251	1,092	69,283	25.49%	4	0	4
Liberal People's Party	FP	1,667	361	1,531	1,899	339	346	220	74	387	538	180	480	213	904	380	494	1,102	895	1,598	1,002	353	743	733	653	565	1,404	912	41	401	1,032	315	744	560	1,037	1,190	499	345	26,137	9.62%	2	0	2
Left Party	V	446	736	959	343	357	407	496	163	1,002	365	163	858	322	461	973	495	1,060	1,017	782	1,911	844	1,180	1,531	247	666	448	1,139	21	480	969	164	396	434	672	421	676	213	23,817	8.76%	1	1	2
Green Party	MP	541	308	885	593	186	165	237	99	343	347	109	445	134	409	379	365	851	630	813	1,158	376	547	958	220	377	547	773	23	280	750	190	306	295	457	517	366	223	16,202	5.96%	1	0	1
Christian Democratic Unity	KDS	1,091	224	505	876	162	186	147	100	182	258	71	207	102	269	166	110	428	445	582	362	172	339	291	329	221	558	264	19	181	374	599	257	232	653	434	292	116	11,804	4.34%	1	0	1
Centre Party	C	373	160	377	434	109	99	81	143	136	164	184	186	84	195	121	88	356	327	472	319	147	299	202	129	152	329	190	37	323	320	84	322	263	259	260	189	81	7,994	2.94%	0	0	0
New Democracy	NyD	177	141	150	166	76	79	78	52	199	73	78	145	67	102	157	33	149	195	133	149	133	231	97	72	113	94	90	17	145	151	36	112	128	161	101	168	35	4,283	1.58%	0	0	0
Other parties		66	130	91	55	55	62	111	13	225	43	14	104	71	58	187	39	101	138	110	128	124	172	94	36	82	57	96	4	85	99	13	67	69	156	51	95	23	3,124	1.15%	0	0	0
Valid votes		12,249	6,580	11,055	13,679	4,536	5,073	4,972	1,646	9,099	4,611	2,505	7,136	3,391	7,059	7,709	3,670	10,583	11,671	12,097	11,719	7,814	11,746	8,164	5,015	6,499	10,017	7,660	450	6,777	9,937	2,670	7,298	6,394	10,709	8,585	8,176	2,879	271,830	100.00%	15	2	17
Rejected votes		138	106	168	190	68	86	50	26	137	55	48	125	53	126	115	74	193	185	221	237	126	164	159	78	115	137	144	5	123	192	49	115	77	135	121	118	58	4,317	1.56%			
Total polled		12,387	6,686	11,223	13,869	4,604	5,159	5,022	1,672	9,236	4,666	2,553	7,261	3,444	7,185	7,824	3,744	10,776	11,856	12,318	11,956	7,940	11,910	8,323	5,093	6,614	10,154	7,804	455	6,900	10,129	2,719	7,413	6,471	10,844	8,706	8,294	2,937	276,147	85.29%			
Registered electors		13,314	8,723	13,132	15,120	5,464	5,977	6,805	1,877	11,908	5,288	2,884	9,053	4,022	9,791	10,444	4,321	12,615	13,915	14,605	14,294	9,772	14,781	9,907	5,542	7,867	11,477	9,274	512	7,746	12,129	3,164	8,141	7,329	12,470	10,200	9,924		323,787				
Turnout		93.04%	76.65%	85.46%	91.73%	84.26%	86.31%	73.80%	89.08%	77.56%	88.24%	88.52%	80.21%	85.63%	73.38%	74.91%	86.65%	85.42%	85.20%	84.34%	83.64%	81.25%	80.58%	84.01%	91.90%	84.07%	88.47%	84.15%	88.87%	89.08%	83.51%	85.94%	91.06%	88.29%	86.96%	85.35%	83.58%		85.29%				

The following candidates were elected: Erling Bager (FP); Claes-Göran Brandin (S); Jan Bergqvist (S); Marianne Carlström (S); Eva Flyborg (FP); Lennart Fridén (M); Tom Heyman (M); Sven Hulterström (S); Anneli Hulthén (S); Inga-Britt Johansson (S); Johan Lönnroth (V); Ingrid Näslund (KDS); Sten Östlund (S); My Persson (M); Sonja Rembo (M); Claes Roxbergh (MP); and Hanna Zetterberg (V).

Permanent substitutions:

- Claes Roxbergh (MP) resigned on 17 October 1994 and was replaced by Kia Andreasson (MP) on 18 October 1994.
- Anneli Hulthén (S) resigned on 8 October 1995 and was replaced by Siw Wittgren-Ahl (S) on 9 October 1995.
- Sonja Rembo (M) resigned on 15 September 1997 and was replaced by Göran Lindblad (M) on 16 September 1997.

===== 1991 =====
Results of the 1991 general election held on 15 September 1991:

Party		Votes per parish																																		Total votes	%	Seats		
Party		Älvs -borg	Ange -red	Anne -dal	Askim	Backa	Bergs -jön	Bergum	Biskops -gården	Björ -kekärr	Björ -landa	Brämare -gården	Dom -kyrko -förs	Gunna -red	Haga	Här -landa	Högs -bo	Johanne -berg	Karl Johan	Korte -dala	Lund -by	Mast -hugg	Nylöse	Örg -ryte	Oskar Fred -rik	Rödbo	Säve	St. Pauli	Styrsö	Tors -landa	Tuve	Tynne -red	Vasa	Västra Frö -lunda	Postal votes	Total votes	%	Con.	Lev.	Tot.
Swedish Social Democratic Party	S	2,090	3,060	2,633	2,103	5,917	2,742	502	5,205	1,552	767	2,934	1,169	3,725	663	3,557	5,495	2,353	3,687	4,143	5,233	2,206	2,702	1,719	1,627	127	2,687	2,970	462	2,207	2,279	5,118	1,059	4,157	808	89,658	33.16%	6	0	6
Moderate Party	M	4,605	1,120	3,164	6,068	2,427	832	284	1,222	1,043	585	1,270	2,496	1,166	975	2,278	2,061	3,967	2,075	1,003	2,142	1,408	1,252	4,283	1,940	119	1,224	2,481	465	1,755	1,520	4,130	3,666	1,335	1,242	67,603	25.00%	5	0	5
Liberal People's Party	FP	1,898	660	1,634	2,220	1,285	452	100	645	701	210	723	941	671	557	1,310	1,210	1,787	1,190	600	1,077	892	724	1,629	1,029	42	577	1,307	329	918	809	2,047	1,253	762	554	32,743	12.11%	2	0	2
Christian Democratic Unity	KDS	1,318	479	900	1,074	842	335	139	456	457	133	438	382	380	169	797	958	917	688	431	715	481	417	787	400	25	368	686	819	452	469	1,442	529	621	229	19,733	7.30%	1	0	1
New Democracy	NyD	810	591	542	972	960	453	161	855	226	270	578	534	739	185	643	747	706	694	574	991	432	436	486	457	45	568	689	176	610	473	1,162	589	538	306	19,198	7.10%	1	0	1
Left Party	V	320	637	762	208	810	456	96	790	279	116	678	315	827	364	773	778	585	1,471	671	969	1,211	503	281	928	10	346	756	89	280	347	736	292	530	240	18,454	6.82%	1	0	1
Green Party	MP	444	238	695	407	329	227	52	252	288	63	325	344	281	360	622	418	604	900	285	400	763	322	414	642	10	160	534	101	210	218	495	373	207	268	12,251	4.53%	0	0	0
Centre Party	C	327	242	353	387	398	142	122	238	173	201	202	169	244	97	346	369	341	297	213	358	229	196	245	200	53	400	307	62	352	280	441	156	228	140	8,508	3.15%	0	1	1
Other parties		43	88	84	29	105	62	9	155	49	14	79	33	112	25	89	119	81	97	85	132	73	63	68	49	3	46	84	8	40	44	127	36	93	34	2,258	0.84%	0	0	0
Valid votes		11,855	7,115	10,767	13,468	13,073	5,701	1,465	9,818	4,768	2,359	7,227	6,383	8,145	3,395	10,415	12,155	11,341	11,099	8,005	12,017	7,695	6,615	9,912	7,272	434	6,376	9,814	2,511	6,824	6,439	15,698	7,953	8,471	3,821	270,406	100.00%	16	1	17
Rejected votes		118	171	175	138	278	134	33	228	87	40	189	96	181	64	210	294	185	324	211	265	217	156	117	195	9	138	227	34	131	140	312	114	161	95	5,467	1.98%			
Total polled		11,973	7,286	10,942	13,606	13,351	5,835	1,498	10,046	4,855	2,399	7,416	6,479	8,326	3,459	10,625	12,449	11,526	11,423	8,216	12,282	7,912	6,771	10,029	7,467	443	6,514	10,041	2,545	6,955	6,579	16,010	8,067	8,632	3,916	275,873	85.70%			
Registered electors		12,791	9,438	12,835	14,822	15,579	7,901	1,664	12,937	5,415	2,667	9,082	8,753	11,247	4,021	12,322	14,555	13,646	13,816	10,102	14,942	9,614	7,946	11,199	9,030	506	7,293	11,926	2,969	7,629	7,473	18,173	9,318	10,303		321,914				
Turnout		93.60%	77.20%	85.25%	91.80%	85.70%	73.85%	90.02%	77.65%	89.66%	89.95%	81.66%	74.02%	74.03%	86.02%	86.23%	85.53%	84.46%	82.68%	81.33%	82.20%	82.30%	85.21%	89.55%	82.69%	87.55%	89.32%	84.19%	85.72%	91.17%	88.04%	88.10%	86.57%	83.78%		85.70%				

The following candidates were elected: Erling Bager (FP); Jan Bergqvist (S); Johan Brohult (NyD); Lennart Fridén (M); Bengt Göransson (S); Doris Håvik (S); Hugo Hegeland (M); Tom Heyman (M); Inga-Britt Johansson (S); Torgny Larsson (S); Johan Lönnroth (V); Ingela Mårtensson (FP); Ingrid Näslund (KDS); Sten Östlund (S); My Persson (M); Sonja Rembo (M); and Rune Thorén (C).

Permanent substitutions:

- Bengt Göransson (S) resigned on 29 September 1991 and was replaced by Marianne Carlström (S) on 30 September 1991.
- Johan Brohult (NyD) resigned on 5 October 1993 and was replaced by Simon Liliedahl (NyD) on 6 October 1993.

==== 1980s ====
===== 1988 =====
Results of the 1988 general election held on 18 September 1988:

Party		Votes per parish																																	Total votes	%	Seats		
Party		Älvs -borg	Ange -red	Anne -dal	Askim	Backa	Bergs -jön	Bergum	Biskops -gården	Björ -landa	Brämare -gården	Dom -kyrko -förs	Gunna -red	Haga	Här -landa	Högs -bo	Johanne -berg	Karl Johan	Korte -dala	Lund -by	Mast -hugg	Nylöse	Örg -ryte	Oskar Fred -rik	Rödbo	Säve	St. Pauli	Styrsö	Tors -landa	Tuve	Tynne -red	Vasa	Västra Frö -lunda	Postal votes	Total votes	%	Con.	Lev.	Tot.
Swedish Social Democratic Party	S	2,360	3,430	2,946	2,399	6,461	3,262	554	6,312	802	3,364	1,204	4,282	509	5,716	6,222	2,636	4,015	4,803	6,036	2,307	3,105	1,892	1,693	154	3,037	3,432	509	2,344	2,626	5,992	984	4,613	937	100,938	37.11%	6	1	7
Moderate Party	M	4,018	927	2,799	5,200	1,672	672	194	1,037	377	933	2,254	837	683	2,787	1,655	3,231	1,640	813	1,744	1,040	980	3,986	1,585	114	831	1,906	452	1,261	1,200	3,228	3,094	1,062	1,002	55,214	20.30%	3	1	4
Liberal People's Party	FP	2,896	920	2,311	3,338	1,776	687	187	1,124	284	1,016	1,299	834	509	2,747	1,827	2,438	1,564	836	1,669	1,105	983	2,359	1,329	60	860	1,707	726	1,127	1,144	3,233	1,719	989	696	46,299	17.02%	3	0	3
Left Party – Communists	VPK	455	769	1,060	353	1,086	596	107	1,241	134	936	444	967	375	1,428	1,191	804	1,815	924	1,293	1,389	712	431	1,134	22	454	1,028	86	319	441	994	445	782	308	24,523	9.02%	2	0	2
Green Party	MP	801	459	1,150	814	697	408	105	640	146	552	638	586	358	1,347	788	1,029	1,372	517	849	1,029	514	774	1,131	32	328	824	174	402	412	991	615	445	414	21,341	7.85%	1	1	2
Centre Party	C	636	335	558	634	615	172	183	382	253	329	253	294	96	723	581	607	419	274	571	252	270	428	315	70	558	514	136	474	459	758	314	324	185	12,972	4.77%	1	0	1
Christian Democratic Unity	KDS	512	204	318	314	331	153	43	166	42	183	126	159	40	465	333	334	230	170	244	177	166	234	124	12	114	250	313	150	130	554	153	220	96	7,060	2.60%	0	0	0
Other parties		50	120	114	50	159	121	11	264	28	102	59	214	25	166	202	120	177	196	188	118	117	52	95	3	72	115	9	47	84	315	33	150	51	3,627	1.33%	0	0	0
Valid votes		11,728	7,164	11,256	13,102	12,797	6,071	1,384	11,166	2,066	7,415	6,277	8,173	2,595	15,379	12,799	11,199	11,232	8,533	12,594	7,417	6,847	10,156	7,406	467	6,254	9,776	2,405	6,124	6,496	16,065	7,357	8,585	3,689	271,974	100.00%	16	3	19
Rejected votes		82	120	121	103	199	103	17	186	34	179	92	160	45	232	188	128	265	162	201	197	111	107	150	2	74	148	26	96	96	225	97	102	74	4,122	1.49%			
Total polled		11,810	7,284	11,377	13,205	12,996	6,174	1,401	11,352	2,100	7,594	6,369	8,333	2,640	15,611	12,987	11,327	11,497	8,695	12,795	7,614	6,958	10,263	7,556	469	6,328	9,924	2,431	6,220	6,592	16,290	7,454	8,687	3,763	276,096	84.57%			
Registered electors		12,880	9,524	13,405	14,623	15,258	8,286	1,598	14,484	2,385	9,423	8,617	11,510	3,207	18,292	15,363	13,671	14,030	10,774	15,670	9,226	8,222	11,539	9,197	524	7,137	12,044	2,826	6,968	7,523	18,900	8,876	10,487		326,469				
Turnout		91.69%	76.48%	84.87%	90.30%	85.17%	74.51%	87.67%	78.38%	88.05%	80.59%	73.91%	72.40%	82.32%	85.34%	84.53%	82.85%	81.95%	80.70%	81.65%	82.53%	84.63%	88.94%	82.16%	89.50%	88.66%	82.40%	86.02%	89.27%	87.62%	86.19%	83.98%	82.84%		84.57%				

The following candidates were elected: Lars Ahlström (M); Erling Bager (FP); Jan Bergqvist (S); Alexander Chrisopoulos (VPK); Viola Claesson (VPK); Kerstin Ekman (FP); Elisabet Franzén (MP); Bengt Göransson (S); Doris Håvik (S); Hugo Hegeland (M); Tom Heyman (M); Sven Hulterström (S); Inga-Britt Johansson (S); Torgny Larsson (S); Ingela Mårtensson (FP); Sten Östlund (S); Sonja Rembo (M); Claes Roxbergh (MP); and Rune Thorén (C).

Permanent substitutions:

- Sven Hulterström (S) resigned on 16 March 1990 and was replaced by Marianne Carlström (S) on 17 March 1990.

===== 1985 =====
Results of the 1985 general election held on 15 September 1985:

Party		Votes per parish																																	Total votes	%	Seats		
Party		Älvs -borg	Ange -red	Anne -dal	Askim	Backa	Bergs -jön	Bergum	Biskops -gården	Björ -landa	Brämare -gården	Dom -kyrko -förs	Gunna -red	Haga	Här -landa	Högs -bo	Johanne -berg	Karl Johan	Korte -dala	Lund -by	Mast -hugg	Nylöse	Örg -ryte	Oskar Fred -rik	Rödbo	Säve	St. Pauli	Styrsö	Tors -landa	Tuve	Tynne -red	Vasa	Västra Frö -lunda	Postal votes	Total votes	%	Con.	Lev.	Tot.
Swedish Social Democratic Party	S	2,526	3,449	3,474	2,544	7,063	3,303	529	7,119	742	3,985	1,268	4,518	594	6,626	7,198	3,148	4,797	5,757	6,828	2,830	3,353	2,215	2,110	141	3,276	4,141	527	2,331	2,783	6,694	1,165	5,301	935	113,270	40.09%	7	0	7
Moderate Party	M	4,485	1,020	3,046	5,758	1,887	715	225	1,178	417	1,113	2,317	931	732	3,115	1,964	3,798	1,800	1,043	2,161	1,163	1,122	4,196	1,752	136	1,050	2,140	599	1,351	1,405	3,703	3,401	1,266	1,336	62,325	22.06%	4	0	4
Liberal People's Party	FP	3,437	1,081	2,912	3,773	2,334	661	191	1,435	310	1,389	1,422	957	557	3,665	2,648	3,111	2,120	1,157	2,242	1,395	1,254	2,964	1,492	84	1,098	2,294	759	1,371	1,440	3,800	2,076	1,517	784	57,730	20.43%	3	1	4
Left Party – Communists	VPK	405	619	1,074	304	1,043	572	106	1,274	159	1,014	527	930	491	1,475	1,204	805	2,100	1,031	1,304	1,738	806	488	1,374	17	407	1,173	77	289	445	1,073	547	787	355	26,013	9.21%	1	1	2
Centre Party	C	728	397	633	612	685	222	207	366	264	350	214	330	73	925	656	606	525	337	641	302	308	398	288	68	556	526	364	423	447	915	287	394	195	14,242	5.04%	1	0	1
Green Party	MP	177	84	294	194	164	77	34	137	33	137	136	116	90	388	178	284	311	122	215	284	160	181	255	10	77	202	32	77	135	236	171	105	120	5,216	1.85%	0	0	0
Other parties		47	214	107	39	164	93	11	311	17	145	44	192	40	148	171	104	282	123	216	150	108	59	123	0	91	111	14	38	67	304	38	137	65	3,773	1.34%	0	0	0
Valid votes		11,805	6,864	11,540	13,224	13,340	5,643	1,303	11,820	1,942	8,133	5,928	7,974	2,577	16,342	14,019	11,856	11,935	9,570	13,607	7,862	7,111	10,501	7,394	456	6,555	10,587	2,372	5,880	6,722	16,725	7,685	9,507	3,790	282,569	100.00%	16	2	18
Rejected votes		77	79	116	75	101	48	7	113	18	123	68	75	28	150	109	107	156	95	112	129	64	53	85	2	45	112	28	54	52	163	84	58	68	2,654	0.93%			
Total polled		11,882	6,943	11,656	13,299	13,441	5,691	1,310	11,933	1,960	8,256	5,996	8,049	2,605	16,492	14,128	11,963	12,091	9,665	13,719	7,991	7,175	10,554	7,479	458	6,600	10,699	2,400	5,934	6,774	16,888	7,769	9,565	3,858	285,223	88.58%			
Registered electors		12,620	8,530	13,215	14,224	15,125	7,274	1,442	14,150	2,168	9,675	7,783	10,174	3,031	18,535	15,928	13,795	14,171	11,296	15,841	9,394	8,173	11,514	8,803	506	7,159	12,307	2,712	6,431	7,522	18,754	8,787	10,943		321,982				
Turnout		94.15%	81.40%	88.20%	93.50%	88.87%	78.24%	90.85%	84.33%	90.41%	85.33%	77.04%	79.11%	85.95%	88.98%	88.70%	86.72%	85.32%	85.56%	86.60%	85.06%	87.79%	91.66%	84.96%	90.51%	92.19%	86.93%	88.50%	92.27%	90.06%	90.05%	88.41%	87.41%		88.58%				

The following candidates were elected: Lars Ahlström (M); Erling Bager (FP); Jan Bergqvist (S); Alexander Chrisopoulos (VPK); Viola Claesson (VPK); Kerstin Ekman (FP); Bengt Göransson (S); Doris Håvik (S); Hugo Hegeland (M); Kurt Hugosson (S); Sven Hulterström (S); Inga-Britt Johansson (S); Björn Molin (FP); Lars Nordström (FP); Sten Östlund (S); Sonja Rembo (M); Lars Tobisson (M); and Rune Thorén (C).

Permanent substitutions:

- Björn Molin (FP) resigned on 31 October 1986 and was replaced by Kerstin Keen (FP) on 1 November 1986.
- Kurt Hugosson (S) resigned on 10 May 1987 and was replaced by Torgny Larsson (S) on 11 May 1987.

===== 1982 =====
Results of the 1982 general election held on 19 September 1982:

Party		Votes per parish																																	Total votes	%	Seats		
Party		Älvs -borg	Ange -red	Anne -dal	Askim	Backa	Bergs -jön	Bergum	Biskops -gården	Björ -landa	Brämare -gården	Dom -kyrko -förs	Gunna -red	Haga	Här -landa	Högs -bo	Johanne -berg	Karl Johan	Korte -dala	Lund -by	Mast -hugg	Nylöse	Örg -ryte	Oskar Fred -rik	Rödbo	Säve	St. Pauli	Styrsö	Tors -landa	Tuve	Tynne -red	Vasa	Västra Frö -lunda	Postal votes	Total votes	%	Con.	Lev.	Tot.
Swedish Social Democratic Party	S	2,372	3,627	3,436	2,518	7,322	3,610	426	7,992	680	4,033	1,147	4,714	441	6,863	7,428	3,179	5,283	6,170	7,287	2,959	3,494	2,203	2,003	151	3,376	3,904	469	2,027	2,813	6,886	1,028	5,601	1,211	116,653	40.80%	7	1	8
Moderate Party	M	5,532	1,324	3,683	7,009	2,588	968	236	1,685	446	1,470	2,596	1,056	719	4,331	2,807	4,855	2,433	1,526	2,857	1,644	1,469	5,376	2,005	163	1,288	2,511	833	1,534	1,721	4,761	3,962	1,695	1,542	78,625	27.50%	4	1	5
Left Party – Communists	VPK	420	645	1,193	392	1,186	686	85	1,544	143	1,196	541	881	466	1,662	1,393	930	2,164	1,149	1,546	1,748	900	531	1,449	12	493	1,278	63	275	467	1,240	582	988	462	28,710	10.04%	2	0	2
Liberal People's Party	FP	1,553	522	1,415	1,568	1,129	383	94	730	110	673	641	369	167	1,964	1,345	1,504	1,066	632	1,177	771	665	1,450	669	39	468	1,062	453	534	667	1,857	860	801	462	27,800	9.72%	2	0	2
Centre Party	C	998	511	999	974	1,071	357	251	627	346	664	355	466	140	1,440	1,108	955	877	587	1,025	495	531	723	496	89	756	838	313	634	699	1,203	465	621	351	21,965	7.68%	1	0	1
Green Party	MP	227	101	303	267	198	89	21	169	37	130	156	122	102	381	231	334	310	139	241	238	142	205	302	7	97	236	27	90	143	253	200	136	160	5,794	2.03%	0	0	0
Christian Democratic Unity	KDS	253	85	150	146	200	82	35	100	18	89	60	113	16	298	213	170	160	97	152	107	83	111	70	6	64	128	134	83	102	303	72	142	70	3,912	1.37%	0	0	0
K-Party	K-P	0	18	15	2	25	26	1	49	1	23	6	13	3	47	28	11	17	38	51	23	8	11	16	0	15	34	5	1	23	30	6	23	5	574	0.20%	0	0	0
Other parties		28	112	75	17	67	41	10	156	9	78	32	64	23	78	98	74	142	57	105	110	50	34	79	0	14	42	1	6	11	135	20	51	39	1,858	0.65%	0	0	0
Valid votes		11,383	6,945	11,269	12,893	13,786	6,242	1,159	13,052	1,790	8,356	5,534	7,798	2,077	17,064	14,651	12,012	12,452	10,395	14,441	8,095	7,342	10,644	7,089	467	6,571	10,033	2,298	5,184	6,646	16,668	7,195	10,058	4,302	285,891	100.00%	16	2	18
Rejected votes		82	78	88	94	101	52	6	142	15	100	63	54	26	146	128	131	146	110	138	111	51	75	117	2	61	132	21	55	75	150	79	65	108	2,802	0.97%			
Total polled		11,465	7,023	11,357	12,987	13,887	6,294	1,165	13,194	1,805	8,456	5,597	7,852	2,103	17,210	14,779	12,143	12,598	10,505	14,579	8,206	7,393	10,719	7,206	469	6,632	10,165	2,319	5,239	6,721	16,818	7,274	10,123	4,410	288,693	90.13%			
Registered electors		12,144	8,301	12,814	13,768	15,235	7,684	1,269	15,094	1,950	9,645	7,315	9,554	2,486	19,188	16,495	13,896	14,658	11,875	16,465	9,546	8,316	11,616	8,339	497	7,129	11,556	2,582	5,620	7,312	18,374	8,178	11,407		320,308				
Turnout		94.41%	84.60%	88.63%	94.33%	91.15%	81.91%	91.80%	87.41%	92.56%	87.67%	76.51%	82.19%	84.59%	89.69%	89.60%	87.38%	85.95%	88.46%	88.55%	85.96%	88.90%	92.28%	86.41%	94.37%	93.03%	87.96%	89.81%	93.22%	91.92%	91.53%	88.95%	88.74%		90.13%				

The following candidates were elected: Lars Ahlström (M); Jan Bergqvist (S); Alexander Chrisopoulos (VPK); Kerstin Ekman (FP); Doris Håvik (S); Hugo Hegeland (M); Kurt Hugosson (S); Inga-Britt Johansson (S); Marie-Ann Johansson (VPK); Valter Kristenson (S); Lisa Mattson (S); Björn Molin (FP); Sten Östlund (S); Göran Riegnell (M); Sonja Rembo (M); Lars-Ingvar Sörenson (S); Lars Tobisson (M); and Rune Torwald (C).

==== 1970s ====
===== 1979 =====
Results of the 1979 general election held on 16 September 1979:

Party		Votes per parish																																	Total votes	%	Seats		
Party		Älvs -borg	Ange -red	Anne -dal	Askim	Backa	Bergs -jön	Bergum	Biskops -gården	Björ -landa	Brämare -gården	Dom -kyrko -förs	Gunna -red	Haga	Här -landa	Högs -bo	Johanne -berg	Karl Johan	Korte -dala	Lund -by	Mast -hugg	Nylöse	Örg -ryte	Oskar Fred -rik	Rödbo	Säve	St. Pauli	Styrsö	Tors -landa	Tuve	Tynne -red	Vasa	Västra Frö -lunda	Postal votes	Total votes	%	Con.	Lev.	Tot.
Swedish Social Democratic Party	S	2,121	3,341	3,202	2,145	6,613	3,216	342	7,425	557	3,827	980	3,624	379	6,555	7,158	3,014	5,159	5,959	6,960	2,830	3,424	2,049	1,585	137	2,895	3,546	360	1,549	2,440	6,000	853	5,331	698	106,274	37.56%	6	1	7
Moderate Party	M	4,628	1,254	3,637	6,090	2,188	956	175	1,638	337	1,298	2,413	801	652	4,133	2,606	4,564	2,338	1,424	2,580	1,490	1,378	5,207	1,702	135	982	2,047	793	1,154	1,538	3,805	3,651	1,591	719	69,904	24.71%	4	1	5
Liberal People's Party	FP	2,248	1,027	2,250	2,345	1,925	775	117	1,561	201	1,267	1,005	654	297	3,204	2,500	2,532	1,922	1,280	2,124	1,267	1,127	2,103	952	67	748	1,716	590	740	1,101	2,878	1,326	1,485	466	45,800	16.19%	3	0	3
Left Party – Communists	VPK	420	681	1,385	381	1,154	604	77	1,636	112	1,115	616	729	507	1,543	1,411	1,077	1,945	1,099	1,526	1,544	839	583	1,386	12	471	1,131	72	254	425	1,235	736	939	378	28,023	9.90%	2	0	2
Centre Party	C	1,106	730	1,211	1,198	1,205	498	305	977	408	747	435	619	202	1,686	1,357	1,196	1,144	822	1,341	676	649	947	582	110	904	956	304	654	803	1,487	592	832	339	27,022	9.55%	2	0	2
Christian Democratic Unity	KDS	140	54	96	70	124	60	26	69	14	54	47	59	12	224	139	125	81	61	99	80	56	62	44	2	37	85	83	51	40	182	42	103	33	2,454	0.87%	0	0	0
Workers' Party – The Communists	APK	5	47	10	11	48	51	3	122	3	60	8	56	3	111	82	19	47	110	98	34	26	11	30	3	24	81	8	4	31	71	6	57	3	1,283	0.45%	0	0	0
Communist Party of Sweden	SKP	9	39	34	3	21	6	1	40	2	13	5	24	9	41	39	15	58	8	17	52	8	11	27	0	3	27	0	2	4	15	12	20	8	573	0.20%	0	0	0
Other parties		47	50	84	52	52	44	4	89	7	35	43	56	30	76	92	86	91	56	62	84	38	39	110	3	15	54	4	7	17	59	43	57	25	1,611	0.57%	0	0	0
Valid votes		10,724	7,223	11,909	12,295	13,330	6,210	1,050	13,557	1,641	8,416	5,552	6,622	2,091	17,573	15,384	12,628	12,785	10,819	14,807	8,057	7,545	11,012	6,418	469	6,079	9,643	2,214	4,415	6,399	15,732	7,261	10,415	2,669	282,944	100.00%	17	2	19
Rejected votes		63	60	130	59	84	54	2	150	8	86	72	68	40	151	159	128	219	106	107	194	52	68	152	3	33	115	6	24	24	130	86	46	56	2,735	0.96%			
Total polled		10,787	7,283	12,039	12,354	13,414	6,264	1,052	13,707	1,649	8,502	5,624	6,690	2,131	17,724	15,543	12,756	13,004	10,925	14,914	8,251	7,597	11,080	6,570	472	6,112	9,758	2,220	4,439	6,423	15,862	7,347	10,461	2,725	285,679	88.71%			
Registered electors		11,442	8,809	13,772	13,161	14,959	7,801	1,164	15,974	1,786	9,883	7,049	8,460	2,561	19,774	17,246	14,431	15,337	12,528	16,996	9,802	8,639	12,072	7,881	502	6,614	11,329	2,450	4,783	7,024	17,677	8,237	11,907		322,050				
Turnout		94.28%	82.68%	87.42%	93.87%	89.67%	80.30%	90.38%	85.81%	92.33%	86.03%	79.78%	79.08%	83.21%	89.63%	90.13%	88.39%	84.79%	87.20%	87.75%	84.18%	87.94%	91.78%	83.37%	94.02%	92.41%	86.13%	90.61%	92.81%	91.44%	89.73%	89.20%	87.86%		88.71%				

The following candidates were elected: Per Bergman (S); Jan Bergqvist (S); Alexander Chrisopoulos (VPK); Kerstin Ekman (FP); Bertil Hansson (FP); Doris Håvik (S); Kurt Hugosson (S); Marie-Ann Johansson (VPK); Valter Kristenson (S); Inger Lindquist (M); Lisa Mattson (S); Björn Molin (FP); Jan Prytz (M); Sonja Rembo (M); Christina Rogestam (C); Bo Siegbahn (M); Lars-Ingvar Sörenson (S); Lars Tobisson (M); and Rune Torwald (C).

===== 1976 =====
Results of the 1976 general election held on 19 September 1976:

Party		Votes per parish																																	Total votes	%	Seats		
Party		Älvs -borg	Ange -red	Anne -dal	Askim	Backa	Bergs -jön	Bergum	Biskops -gården	Björ -landa	Brämare -gården	Dom -kyrko -förs	Gunna -red	Haga	Här -landa	Högs -bo	Johanne -berg	Karl Johan	Korte -dala	Lund -by	Mast -hugg	Nylöse	Örg -ryte	Oskar Fred -rik	Rödbo	Säve	St. Pauli	Styrsö	Tors -landa	Tuve	Tynne -red	Vasa	Västra Frö -lunda	Postal votes	Total votes	%	Con.	Lev.	Tot.
Swedish Social Democratic Party	S	2,143	3,393	3,653	2,076	6,879	3,061	330	7,901	518	4,153	1,097	2,872	354	7,564	7,912	3,414	5,904	6,313	7,702	3,176	3,792	2,312	1,788	135	2,516	4,062	331	1,363	2,569	5,971	961	5,638	1,063	112,916	38.89%	7	0	7
People's Party	F	2,407	1,084	2,839	2,716	2,036	820	121	1,730	187	1,359	1,227	638	238	3,800	2,868	3,108	2,286	1,487	2,366	1,475	1,280	2,760	1,314	68	698	2,045	608	728	1,219	2,978	1,805	1,832	700	52,827	18.19%	3	1	4
Moderate Party	M	3,004	792	3,010	4,048	1,372	621	106	1,059	208	910	1,776	395	287	3,118	1,911	3,785	1,820	1,004	1,798	1,221	956	4,429	1,371	90	536	1,517	448	682	1,024	2,249	3,226	1,110	791	50,674	17.45%	3	0	3
Centre Party	C	1,799	1,302	1,976	1,979	2,211	937	390	2,049	531	1,327	802	902	211	2,859	2,338	1,966	1,928	1,618	2,415	1,194	1,149	1,545	1,068	135	1,170	1,586	545	1,048	1,368	2,484	1,072	1,530	646	46,080	15.87%	3	0	3
Left Party – Communists	VPK	302	590	1,076	333	1,037	520	59	1,435	90	925	579	476	421	1,389	1,222	847	1,537	1,112	1,477	1,100	668	491	1,030	11	330	988	44	181	398	970	588	868	388	23,482	8.09%	1	1	2
Christian Democratic Unity	KDS	155	73	114	60	123	37	14	77	12	60	47	68	10	232	151	130	113	77	98	80	62	89	31	6	31	89	95	48	60	165	35	101	40	2,583	0.89%	0	0	0
Communist Party of Sweden	SKP	8	49	51	8	49	17	3	68	4	45	34	41	31	39	78	53	110	33	60	103	24	14	60	0	8	57	2	4	6	73	26	70	20	1,248	0.43%	0	0	0
Other parties		10	14	19	7	13	10	0	48	2	10	14	10	29	20	24	26	20	11	13	49	18	13	70	0	1	20	0	1	3	18	26	20	16	555	0.19%	0	0	0
Valid votes		9,828	7,297	12,738	11,227	13,720	6,023	1,023	14,367	1,552	8,789	5,576	5,402	1,581	19,021	16,504	13,329	13,718	11,655	15,929	8,398	7,949	11,653	6,732	445	5,290	10,364	2,073	4,055	6,647	14,908	7,739	11,169	3,664	290,365	100.00%	17	2	19
Rejected votes		30	55	90	25	45	31	1	146	2	62	59	41	54	83	100	69	148	79	68	114	52	56	135	0	17	60	3	11	30	85	50	44	44	1,889	0.65%			
Total polled		9,858	7,352	12,828	11,252	13,765	6,054	1,024	14,513	1,554	8,851	5,635	5,443	1,635	19,104	16,604	13,398	13,866	11,734	15,997	8,512	8,001	11,709	6,867	445	5,307	10,424	2,076	4,066	6,677	14,993	7,789	11,213	3,708	292,254	90.09%			
Registered electors		10,415	8,642	14,292	12,004	15,161	7,306	1,102	16,627	1,670	10,192	6,821	6,727	2,114	21,018	18,169	15,050	16,247	13,266	18,017	10,062	9,008	12,676	8,106	473	5,653	12,039	2,287	4,346	7,224	16,464	8,637	12,572		324,387				
Turnout		94.65%	85.07%	89.76%	93.74%	90.79%	82.86%	92.92%	87.29%	93.05%	86.84%	82.61%	80.91%	77.34%	90.89%	91.39%	89.02%	85.34%	88.45%	88.79%	84.60%	88.82%	92.37%	84.72%	94.08%	93.88%	86.59%	90.77%	93.56%	92.43%	91.07%	90.18%	89.19%		90.09%				

The following candidates were elected: Bengt Bengtsson (C); Per Bergman (S); Holger Bergqvist (F); Jan Bergqvist (S); Ingegärd Frænkel (F); Rolf Hagel (VPK); Karl Hallgren (VPK); Doris Håvik (S); Nils Hörberg (F); Kurt Hugosson (S); Valter Kristenson (S); Inger Lindquist (M); Lisa Mattson (S); Björn Molin (F); Ove Nordstrandh (M); Christina Rogestam (C); Bo Siegbahn (M); Lars-Ingvar Sörenson (S); and Rune Torwald (C).

===== 1973 =====
Results of the 1973 general election held on 16 September 1973:

Party		Votes per parish																																	Total votes	%	Seats		
Party		Älvs -borg	Ange -red	Anne -dal	Askim	Backa	Bergs -jön	Bergum	Biskops -gården	Björ -landa	Brämare -gården	Dom -kyrko -förs	Gunna -red	Haga	Här -landa	Högs -bo	Johanne -berg	Karl Johan	Korte -dala	Lund -by	Mast -hugg	Nylöse	Örg -ryte	Oskar Fred -rik	Rödbo	Säve	St. Pauli	Styrsö	Tors -landa	Tuve	Tynne -red	Vasa	Västra Frö -lunda	Postal votes	Total votes	%	Con.	Lev.	Tot.
Swedish Social Democratic Party	S	1,925	3,488	3,272	1,531	6,267	2,655	271	7,729	411	4,143	1,282	1,784	396	7,939	7,631	3,538	6,113	6,138	7,740	3,513	3,958	2,450	1,934	130	922	4,482	235	1,003	2,543	5,341	1,023	5,374	914	108,075	38.22%	7	1	8
People's Party	F	2,186	1,153	2,886	1,787	1,842	763	147	1,878	158	1,415	1,448	476	324	4,097	3,112	3,382	2,653	1,582	2,555	1,686	1,324	2,972	1,395	51	322	2,300	650	487	1,127	2,545	2,092	1,965	608	53,368	18.87%	3	1	4
Moderate Party	M	2,411	722	2,685	3,031	1,186	494	102	1,103	176	866	1,725	299	330	3,014	1,918	3,509	1,709	1,005	1,592	1,126	956	4,378	1,407	70	328	1,441	273	564	944	1,840	3,221	1,090	651	46,166	16.33%	3	0	3
Centre Party	C	1,401	1,431	1,576	1,570	2,260	910	362	2,359	521	1,424	773	727	248	2,754	2,386	1,858	1,785	1,851	2,457	1,288	1,143	1,420	963	134	792	1,586	426	920	1,489	2,367	970	1,633	776	44,560	15.76%	3	0	3
Left Party – Communists	VPK	307	701	835	213	1,111	570	57	1,784	106	1,060	466	411	250	1,439	1,494	782	1,448	1,367	1,784	935	750	577	768	14	144	954	30	158	412	934	381	1,062	337	23,641	8.36%	1	1	2
Christian Democratic Unity	KDS	200	65	111	82	132	46	18	84	14	84	64	42	21	282	153	114	126	94	143	106	70	96	64	5	13	108	134	65	63	184	53	100	41	2,977	1.05%	0	0	0
Communist League Marxist–Leninists (the revolutionaries)	KFML(r)	23	93	109	16	78	44	5	109	5	70	57	32	128	95	120	100	144	84	115	145	49	74	174	1	10	122	1	4	26	82	74	75	37	2,301	0.81%	0	0	0
Communist Party of Sweden	SKP	20	26	52	7	68	11	3	111	0	101	24	3	32	74	130	46	127	49	114	107	71	19	54	0	0	123	0	0	5	69	17	73	19	1,555	0.55%	0	0	0
Other parties		1	8	13	2	1	4	0	1	0	3	4	0	5	2	7	3	7	3	2	6	4	6	10	0	0	6	2	0	1	9	10	4	4	128	0.05%	0	0	0
Valid votes		8,474	7,687	11,539	8,239	12,945	5,497	965	15,158	1,391	9,166	5,843	3,774	1,734	19,696	16,951	13,332	14,112	12,173	16,502	8,912	8,325	11,992	6,769	405	2,531	11,122	1,751	3,201	6,610	13,371	7,841	11,376	3,387	282,771	100.00%	17	3	20
Rejected votes		9	12	26	12	11	10	2	15	2	7	14	5	4	22	15	32	21	17	14	19	9	18	18	1	3	16	1	9	12	12	23	10	18	419	0.15%			
Total polled		8,483	7,699	11,565	8,251	12,956	5,507	967	15,173	1,393	9,173	5,857	3,779	1,738	19,718	16,966	13,364	14,133	12,190	16,516	8,931	8,334	12,010	6,787	406	2,534	11,138	1,752	3,210	6,622	13,383	7,864	11,386	3,405	283,190	88.93%			
Registered electors		9,107	9,026	13,184	8,785	14,363	6,750	1,055	17,423	1,513	10,717	7,177	4,652	2,372	21,930	18,634	15,130	16,717	13,901	18,821	10,672	9,629	13,149	8,301	427	2,714	13,134	1,945	3,467	7,181	14,855	8,876	12,829		318,436				
Turnout		93.15%	85.30%	87.72%	93.92%	90.20%	81.59%	91.66%	87.09%	92.07%	85.59%	81.61%	81.23%	73.27%	89.91%	91.05%	88.33%	84.54%	87.69%	87.75%	83.69%	86.55%	91.34%	81.76%	95.08%	93.37%	84.80%	90.08%	92.59%	92.22%	90.09%	88.60%	88.75%		88.93%				

The following candidates were elected: Bengt Bengtsson (C); Per Bergman (S); Jan Bergqvist (S); Ingegärd Frænkel (F); Sven Gustafson (F); Gösta Gustafsson (S); Karl Hallgren (VPK); Doris Håvik (S); Nils Hörberg (F); Kurt Hugosson (S); Valter Kristenson (S); Inger Lindquist (M); Lisa Mattson (S); Björn Molin (F); Ove Nordstrandh (M); Christina Rogestam (C); Gunvor Ryding (VPK); Bo Siegbahn (M); Lars-Ingvar Sörenson (S); and Rune Torwald (C).

===== 1970 =====
Results of the 1970 general election held on 20 September 1970:

Party		Votes per parish																													Total votes	%	Seats		
Party		Älvs -borg	Ange -red	Anne -dal	Backa	Bergum	Biskops -gården	Björ -landa	Brämare -gården	Gust -avi	Haga	Här -landa	Högs -bo	Johanne -berg	Karl Johan	Korte -dala	Kris -tine	Lund -by	Mast -hugget	Nylöse	Örg -ryte	Oskar Fred -rik	Säve	St. Pauli	Tors -landa	Tuve	Tynne -red	Vasa	Västra Frö -lunda	Postal votes	Total votes	%	Con.	Lev.	Tot.
Swedish Social Democratic Party	S	1,551	2,640	3,235	2,829	243	7,626	326	4,367	438	534	7,241	6,658	2,919	6,073	5,946	1,010	7,479	3,343	5,785	2,366	1,719	746	4,740	877	1,591	4,196	826	4,917	11,374	103,595	37.90%	7	1	8
People's Party	F	2,763	1,428	4,042	1,648	196	3,534	225	2,241	1,092	599	5,781	4,831	4,050	3,792	2,761	1,019	3,724	2,474	3,019	4,121	1,814	435	3,276	768	1,296	3,557	2,579	2,919	17,320	87,304	31.94%	5	1	6
Moderate Party	M	1,138	365	1,403	422	64	689	98	481	513	212	1,462	1,077	1,425	894	643	339	849	589	688	2,176	665	222	769	285	431	794	1,461	622	8,050	28,826	10.54%	2	0	2
Centre Party	C	604	805	871	711	269	1,467	452	782	157	157	1,349	1,314	706	920	1,049	238	1,395	622	1,135	649	459	576	856	609	695	1,213	365	970	3,961	25,356	9.28%	2	0	2
Left Party – Communists	VPK	275	598	730	544	51	1,952	80	1,134	109	199	1,345	1,417	605	1,505	1,314	271	1,949	905	1,224	527	539	65	1,068	135	253	772	225	1,046	1,758	22,595	8.27%	1	1	2
Communist League Marxists-Leninists	KFML	26	60	130	48	6	181	11	139	17	61	136	202	124	232	147	59	178	149	157	65	84	11	139	5	23	105	56	106	317	2,974	1.09%	0	0	0
Christian Democratic Unity	KDS	142	40	104	69	17	71	15	94	46	25	232	118	81	100	70	14	142	117	106	72	74	16	102	52	41	149	42	122	408	2,681	0.98%	0	0	0
Other parties		0	1	1	1	0	0	0	0	0	0	0	0	1	0	0	1	0	0	0	1	0	0	0	0	0	2	2	0	28	38	0.01%	0	0	0
Valid votes		6,499	5,937	10,516	6,272	846	15,520	1,207	9,238	2,372	1,787	17,546	15,617	9,911	13,516	11,930	2,951	15,716	8,199	12,114	9,977	5,354	2,071	10,950	2,731	4,330	10,788	5,556	10,702	43,216	273,369	100.00%	17	3	20
Rejected votes		5	12	19	9	0	10	1	8	5	5	32	9	8	9	8	2	11	12	11	7	10	3	14	0	4	11	9	6	236	476	0.17%			
Total polled exc. postal votes		6,504	5,949	10,535	6,281	846	15,530	1,208	9,246	2,377	1,792	17,578	15,626	9,919	13,525	11,938	2,953	15,727	8,211	12,125	9,984	5,364	2,074	10,964	2,731	4,334	10,799	5,565	10,708	43,452	273,845				
Postal votes		1,088	844	2,889	860	73	1,953	116	1,410	873	428	3,336	2,449	3,193	2,254	1,548	605	1,995	1,602	2,063	3,275	1,501	243	1,887	303	651	1,731	2,608	1,531	-43,452	-143				
Total polled inc. postal votes		7,592	6,793	13,424	7,141	919	17,483	1,324	10,656	3,250	2,220	20,914	18,075	13,112	15,779	13,486	3,558	17,722	9,813	14,188	13,259	6,865	2,317	12,851	3,034	4,985	12,530	8,173	12,239	0	273,702	86.37%			
Registered electors		8,380	7,895	15,652	7,978	1,034	20,224	1,451	12,667	3,865	3,278	23,332	20,007	15,142	18,889	15,431	4,680	20,546	11,865	17,063	14,638	8,582	2,528	15,676	3,316	5,472	14,031	9,364	13,896		316,882				
Turnout		90.60%	86.04%	85.77%	89.51%	88.88%	86.45%	91.25%	84.12%	84.09%	7.72%	89.64%	90.34%	86.59%	83.54%	87.40%	76.03%	86.26%	82.71%	83.15%	90.58%	79.99%	91.65%	81.98%	91.50%	91.10%	89.30%	87.28%	88.08%		86.37%				

The following candidates were elected: Bengt Bengtsson (C); Per Bergman (S); Jan Bergqvist (S); Kaj Björk (S); Paul Brundin (M); Tage Erlander (S); Ingegärd Frænkel (F); Sven Gustafson (F); Karl Hallgren (VPK); Doris Håvik (S); Nils Hörberg (F); Kurt Hugosson (S); Thorvald Källstad (F); Valter Kristenson (S); Lisa Mattson (S); Björn Molin (F); Birger Möller (F); Ove Nordstrandh (M); Gunvor Ryding (VPK); and Rune Torwald (C).
