= Flyborg =

Flyborg is a surname. Notable people with the surname include:

- Elin Flyborg (born 1976), Swedish footballer
- Eva Flyborg (born 1963), Swedish politician
