= Holmdahl =

Holmdahl is a Swedish surname. Notable people with the surname include:

- Emil Lewis Holmdahl (1883–1963), United States Army officer
- Johanna Holmdahl (born 1982), Swedish politician
- John W. Holmdahl (1924–2017), American politician
- Martin H:son Holmdahl (1923–2015), Swedish physician
