= Maj Karlsson =

Swedish politician (born 1980)

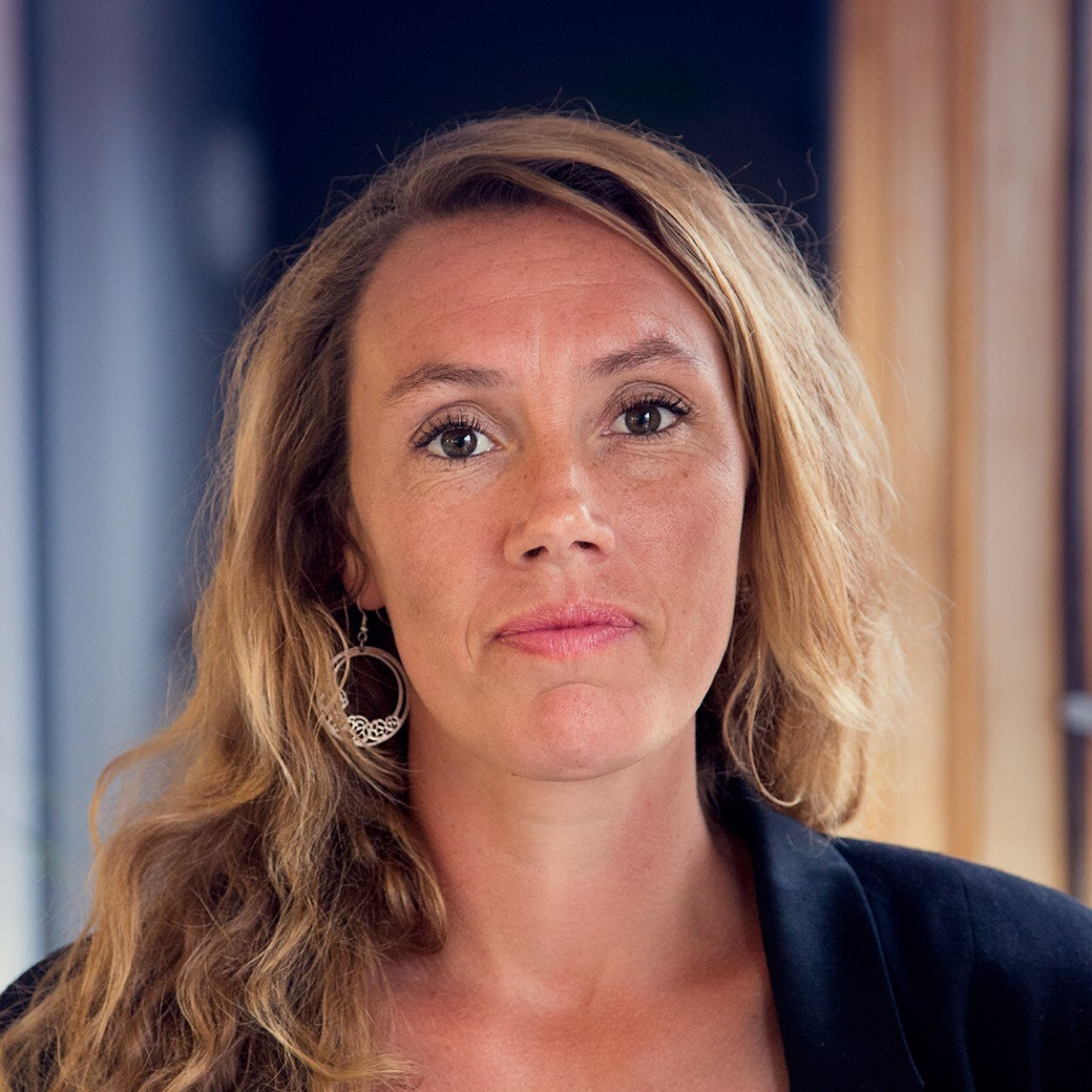
- Karlsson in 2021

Member of the Riksdag for Gothenburg City
- Incumbent
- Assumed office 2014

Personal details
- Born: 21 May 1980 (age 45) Gothenburg, Sweden
- Party: Left Party

Maj Git Elisabeth Karlsson (born 21 May 1980) is a Swedish politician who has served in the Riksdag since 2014.

== Biography ==
Karlsson studied political science at the University of Gothenburg. She was elected to the Riksdag in 2014 and since 2016 has served as vice-group leader in the Left Party's Riksdag group.
