= Daniel Bernmar =

Swedish politician (born 1982)

- Bernmar in 2019

Member of the Riksdag
- Incumbent
- Assumed office 28 September 2026
- Constituency: Gothenburg Municipality

Personal details
- Born: 12 November 1982 (age 43)
- Party: Left Party
- Relatives: Anders Bernmar (grandfather)

Carl Daniel Bernmar (born 12 November 1982) is a Swedish politician who was elected member of the Riksdag in 2026. He has served as deputy mayor of Gothenburg since 2022.
