= Dženan Čišija =

Swedish politician (born 1976)

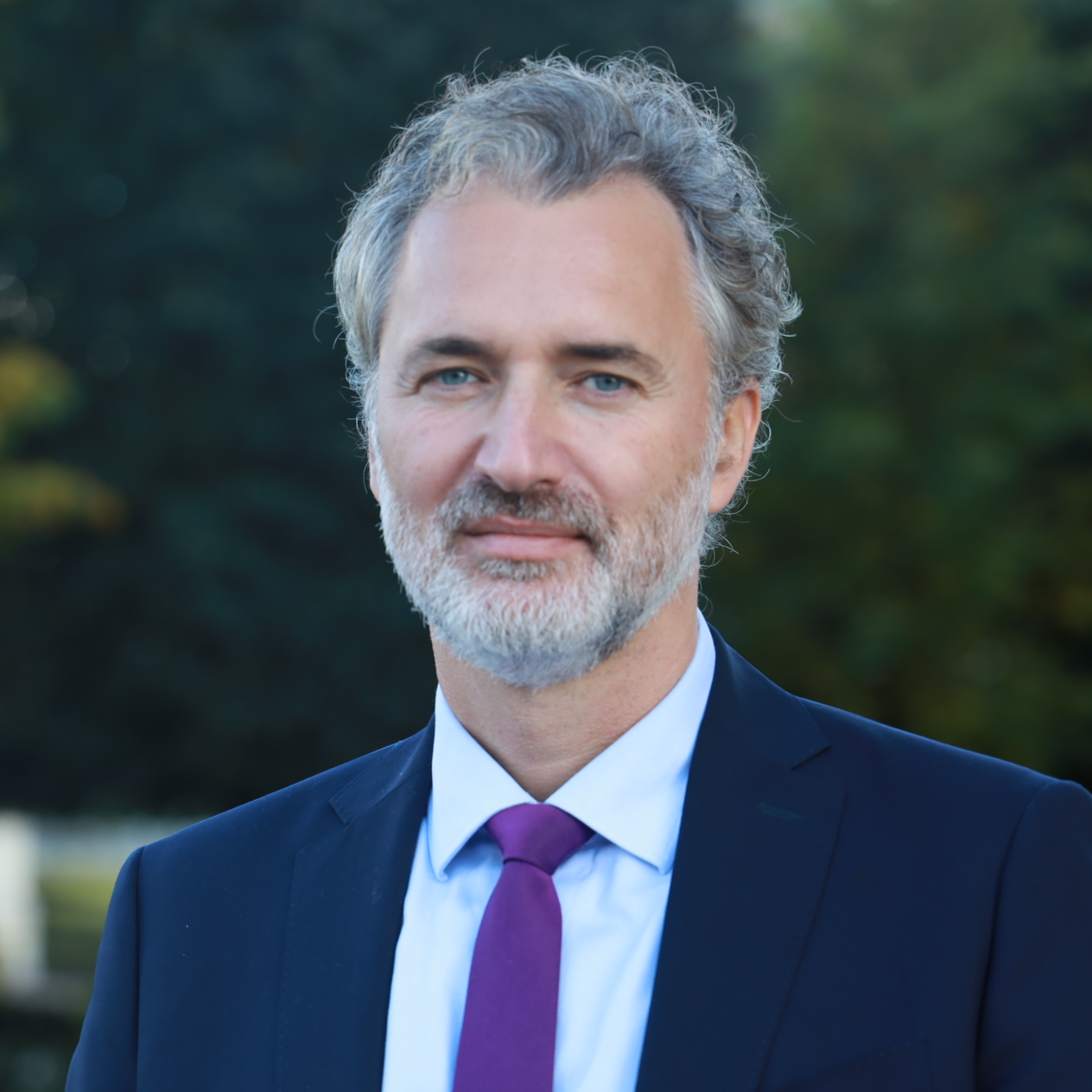

Member of the Riksdag
- Incumbent
- Assumed office 26 September 2022
- Constituency: Gothenburg Municipality

Personal details
- Born: 1976 (age 49–50) Pula
- Party: Social Democrats

Dženan Čišija (born 1976) is a Swedish politician. He was elected as Member of the Riksdag in September 2022. He represents the constituency of Gothenburg Municipality. He is affiliated with the Social Democrats.
