= Björlanda Church =

Church in Gothenburg Municipality, Sweden

Coordinates: 57°45′41.27″N 11°49′28.44″E

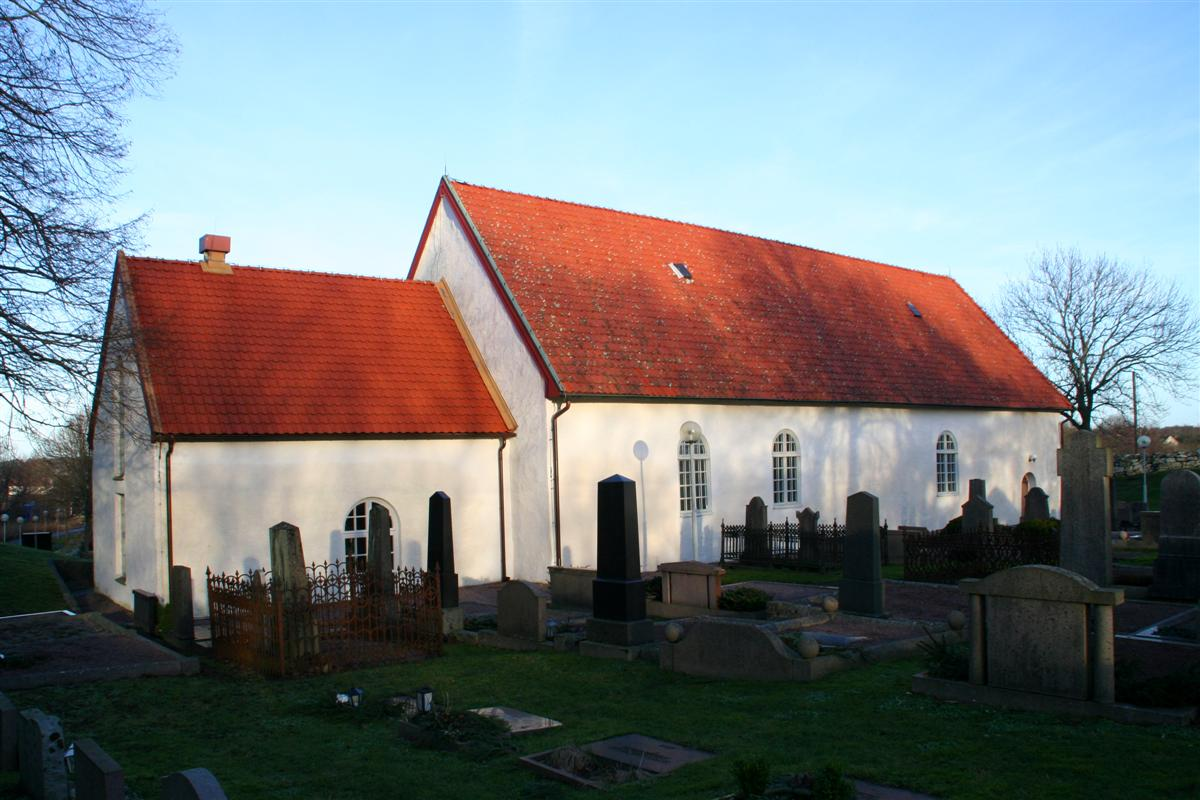
The Björlanda Church and churchyard

The Björlanda Church (Swedish: Björlanda kyrka) is a medieval church in Björlanda, Gothenburg Municipality, western Sweden. It is located on the Hisingen island and belongs to the parish of Torslanda-Björlanda in the Diocese of Gothenburg.

== History ==
The church was built in the 12th century, and inaugurated, according to the Icelandic skald Eysteinn Ásgrímsson, on a 15 July; the year of the inauguration is not known. The building has been renovated and extended numerous times. Additional windows were installed in the 17th century. In 1734, the medieval choir was torn down. The renovation works of 1936 resulted in the discovery of medieval murals.

The church is surrounded by a churchyard, the first records of which come from the 18th century.
