= Ingrid Andreae =

Swedish politician (born 1961)

Member of the Riksdag
- Incumbent
- Assumed office 28 September 2026
- Constituency: Gothenburg Municipality

Personal details
- Born: 1961 (age 64–65) Sweden
- Party: Swedish Social Democratic Party

Ingrid Andreae (born 1961) is a Swedish politician from the Social Democratic Party. She has been a member of the Riksdag since 2026, elected for the Gothenburg Municipality constituency.

== Background ==
Andreae has worked as an ombudsman for the Swedish Trade Union Confederation (LO). Before the 2026 parliamentary election, she was retired and living in Gothenburg.

== Political career ==
Andreae has been a member of the regional council in the Västra Götaland Region, including during the terms of office 2002–2006 and 2022–2026. During the latter term of office, she has also been chair of the regional council's nomination committee.

Since March 2023, she has been the chairwoman of the board of Göteborgs Symfoniker AB. She has also been a member of the board of the region's trains and trams and has been a board member of Västtrafik since October 2025.

Andreae was elected to the Riksdag in the 2026 Swedish general election.

== See also ==
- List of members of the Riksdag, 2026–2030
