= Gustaf Göthberg =

Swedish politician (born 1993)

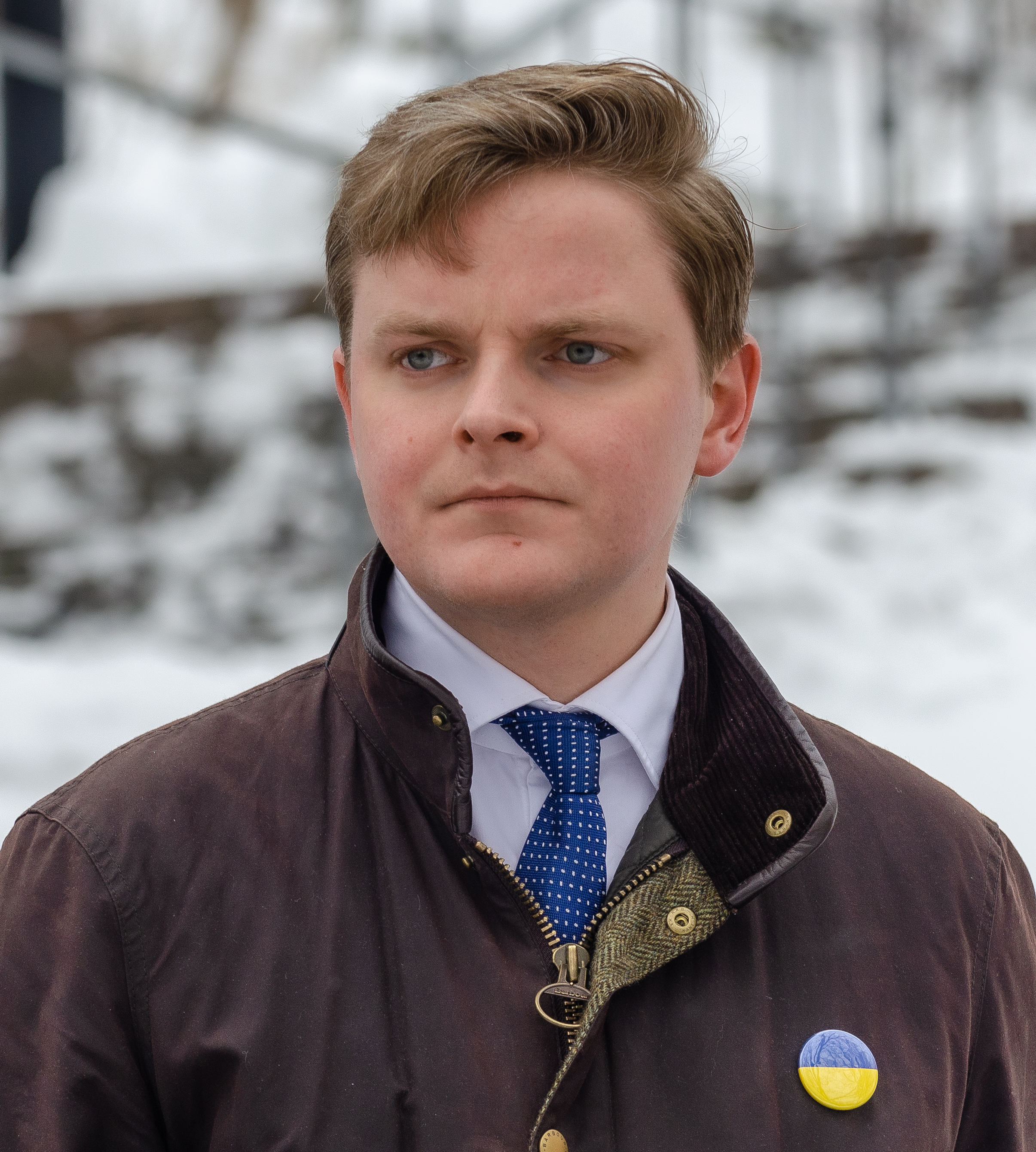
- Göthberg in 2023

Member of the Riksdag
- Incumbent
- Assumed office 26 September 2022
- Constituency: Gothenburg Municipality

Personal details
- Born: 30 November 1993 (age 32)
- Party: Moderate Party

Gustaf Göthberg (born 30 November 1993) is a Swedish politician serving as a member of the Riksdag since 2022. He is concurrently a substitute member of the Parliamentary Assembly of the Council of Europe since 2022. Since 2026, he sits as first vice chairman of the committee on legal affairs and human rights in the assembly.
