= Claes-Göran Brandin =

Swedish politician (born 1948)

Member of the Riksdag
- In office 3 October 1994 – 4 October 2010
- Constituency: Gothenburg Municipality

Personal details
- Born: 1948 (age 77–78)
- Party: Social Democratic Party

Claes-Göran Brandin (born 1948) is a Swedish politician and former member of the Riksdag, the national legislature. A member of the Social Democratic Party, he represented Gothenburg Municipality between October 1994 and October 2010.
