= Viola Claesson =

Swedish politician (1939–2026)

Member of the Riksdag for Gothenburg Municipality
- In office 30 September 1985 – 30 September 1991

Personal details
- Born: Viola Anita Claesson; 22 August 1939 Mark Municipality, Sweden
- Died: 5 April 2026 (aged 86) Varberg, Sweden
- Party: V

Viola Anita Claesson (22 August 1939 – 5 April 2026) was a Swedish politician. A member of the Left Party, she served in the Riksdag from 1985 to 1991.

Claesson died in Varberg on 5 April 2026, at the age of 86.
