= Marie-Louise Hänel Sandström =

Swedish politician (born 1968)

Member of the Riksdag
- Incumbent
- Assumed office 26 September 2022
- Constituency: Gothenburg Municipality

Personal details
- Born: 18 October 1968 (age 57) Västra Frölunda, Sweden
- Party: Moderate Party

Anne Marie-Louise Hänel Sandström (born 18 October 1968) is a Swedish politician from the Moderate Party who has been a member of parliament for Gothenburg Municipality since the 2022 general election.

== See also ==
- List of members of the Riksdag, 2018–2022
- List of members of the Riksdag, 2022–2026
- List of members of the Riksdag, 2026–2030
