= Leila Ali Elmi =

Swedish politician (born 1988)

Member of the Riksdag
- Incumbent
- Assumed office 24 September 2018
- Constituency: Gothenburg Municipality

Personal details
- Born: 16 January 1988 (age 38) Ethiopia
- Party: Green Party

Leila Ali Elmi (born 16 January 1988) is an Ethiopian-born Swedish politician of Somali origin. She has been a member of the Swedish Riksdag since 24 September 2018. She is a member of the Green Party, which she joined in 2014.

She was born on 16 January 1988 in Ethiopia to a Somali family. When she was three, her family moved to Sweden. She grew up in Hjällbo, outside Gothenburg. After upper secondary school, she had jobs cleaning and delivering newspapers. She worked as an interpreter for nine years before her election to the Riksdag.

She campaigned primarily on a platform of improving schools in disadvantaged areas.
