= Emma Altenhammar =

Swedish politician (born 1998)

Member of the Riksdag
- Incumbent
- Assumed office 28 September 2026
- Constituency: Gothenburg Municipality

Personal details
- Born: 19 May 1998 (age 28)
- Party: Sweden Democrats

Emma Olivia Ylivallo Altenhammar (born 19 May 1998) is a Swedish politician who was elected member of the Riksdag in 2026. She has been a municipal councillor of Gothenburg since 2022.
