= Emma Nohrén =

Swedish politician (born 1980)

Member of the Riksdag
- Incumbent
- Assumed office 26 September 2022
- Constituency: Gothenburg Municipality

Member of the Riksdag
- In office 29 September 2014 – 24 September 2018
- Constituency: Västra Götaland County West

Personal details
- Born: 1980 (age 45–46)
- Party: Green Party

Emma Nohrén (born 1980) is a Swedish politician. She was elected as Member of the Riksdag in September 2022. She represents the constituency of Gothenburg Municipality. She is affiliated with the Green Party.

She also served as Member of the Riksdag from 29 September 2014 to 24 September 2018. She represented the constituency of Västra Götaland County West.
