= David Josefsson =

Swedish politician (born 1983)

Member of the Riksdag
- Incumbent
- Assumed office 24 September 2018
- Constituency: Gothenburg Municipality

Personal details
- Born: 26 December 1983 (age 42)
- Party: Moderate Party

David Albert Gustaf Josefsson (born 26 December 1983) is a Swedish politician serving as a member of the Riksdag since 2018. From 2019 to 2023, he served as chairman of the Moderate Party in Gothenburg.
