= Björn Tidland =

Swedish politician (born 1963)

Björn Arne Tidland

Member of the Riksdag
- Incumbent
- Assumed office 26 September 2022
- Constituency: Gothenburg Municipality

Personal details
- Born: 4 March 1963 (age 63) Sweden
- Party: Sweden Democrats
- Education: Chalmers Institute of Technology
- Occupation: Engineer

Björn Arne Tidland (born 4 March 1963) is a Swedish politician of the Sweden Democrats who since 2022 has been a member of the Riksdag representing the constituency of Gothenburg Municipality.

Tidland holds a master's degree in mechanical engineering from Chalmers Institute of Technology and worked as a designer at Semcon.

He is a municipal councilor and board member for the Sweden Democrats in Gothenburg where he also serves as the party's spokesman on culture on the council and is a member of the council's cultural committee. For the 2022 Swedish general election, Tidland was elected to parliament to represent Gothenburg Municipality.

== See also ==
- List of members of the Riksdag, 2022–2026
