= Jennifer Merelaid Hankins =

Swedish politician (born 1985)

Member of the Riksdag
- Incumbent
- Assumed office 28 September 2026
- Constituency: Västerbotten County

Personal details
- Born: 1985 (age 40–41)
- Party: Left Party
- Education: University of Gothenburg

Jennifer Tiina Gwendolyn Merelaid Hankins (born 1985) is a Swedish politician for the Left Party. She has been a member of the Riksdag since 2026, elected for the Gothenburg Municipality constituency.

== Biography ==
Hankins grew up in Backa, Gothenburg. She has post-secondary education and has studied at the University of Gothenburg. She has worked in public administration and social services. Before the 2022 Swedish general election, she stated that she was a social scientist and worked as a political secretary. Before the 2026 election, she worked as a development manager in social service.

== Political career ==
Hankins has held political positions for the Left Party since 2019. She has been active in a district committee, a municipal housing company and two social welfare committees in Gothenburg, among other things. She has also been chair of the Left Party's party association in Majorna and worked for five years as political secretary for the Left Party in Gothenburg.

During the 2022–2026 term, Hankin was a deputy in the Riksdag for the Left Party in the Gothenburg municipality constituency.

Hankins was first vice-chair of the Gothenburg Primary School Board in 2026. n this role, she participated in the political management of the school organization in Gothenburg, among other things.

In the 2026 Swedish general election, Hankins was elected as a member of parliament for the Gothenburg municipality constituency.

== See also ==
- List of members of the Riksdag, 2026–2030
