= Johanna Holmdahl =

Swedish politician (born 1982)

Member of the Riksdag
- Incumbent
- Assumed office 28 September 2026
- Constituency: Gothenburg Municipality

Personal details
- Born: 1982 (age 43–44) Gothenburg, Sweden
- Party: Christian Democrats

Johanna Holmdahl (born 1982) is a Swedish psychologist and politician for the Christian Democrats. She has been a serving deputy in the Swedish Parliament since 2026, elected for the Gothenburg Municipality constituency.

== Biography ==
Holmdahl is a licensed psychologist and has post-secondary education. She has held political positions for the Christian Democrats since 2019.

Holmdahl was a member of the Gothenburg City Council during the 2022–2026 term . She has also been a member of the city council's nomination committee and has held assignments within, among others, the Greater Gothenburg Emergency Service and the Gothenburg City Social Welfare and Development Board.

After the 2026 Swedish general election, Holmdahl became a serving deputy minister in the Riksdag for the Christian Democrats in the Gothenburg municipality constituency. She began serving on 28 September 2026.

== See also ==
- List of members of the Riksdag, 2026–2030
