= Erling Bager =

Swedish politician (born 1946)

Erling Bager (born 1946) is a Swedish Liberal People's Party politician. He was a member of the Riksdag from 1985–1998, and then again from 2002–2006.
