= Gunilla Carlsson i Hisings Backa =

Swedish politician (born 1966)

Carlsson presenting herself at the Gothenburg bookfair 2012.

Gunilla Carlsson (born 1966) is a Swedish politician for the Social Democratic Party. She has been a member of the Riksdag since 2002.
