= Lisa Mattson =

Swedish politician (1918–1997)

Lisa Mattson (1918-1997) was a Swedish politician (Social Democrat).

She was active in the Social-Demokraten in 1941–1943, Idun 1944, Morgon-Tidningen 1945, and Ny Tid 1948–1963.

She was an MP in 1959-1983 and Deputy Chairperson of the Committee on Justice in 1974-1983. She was the chairperson of the Social Democratic Women in Sweden in 1964–1981. She was a Delegate of the United Nations in 1974-1975.
