= Marianne Carlström =

Swedish politician (born 1946)

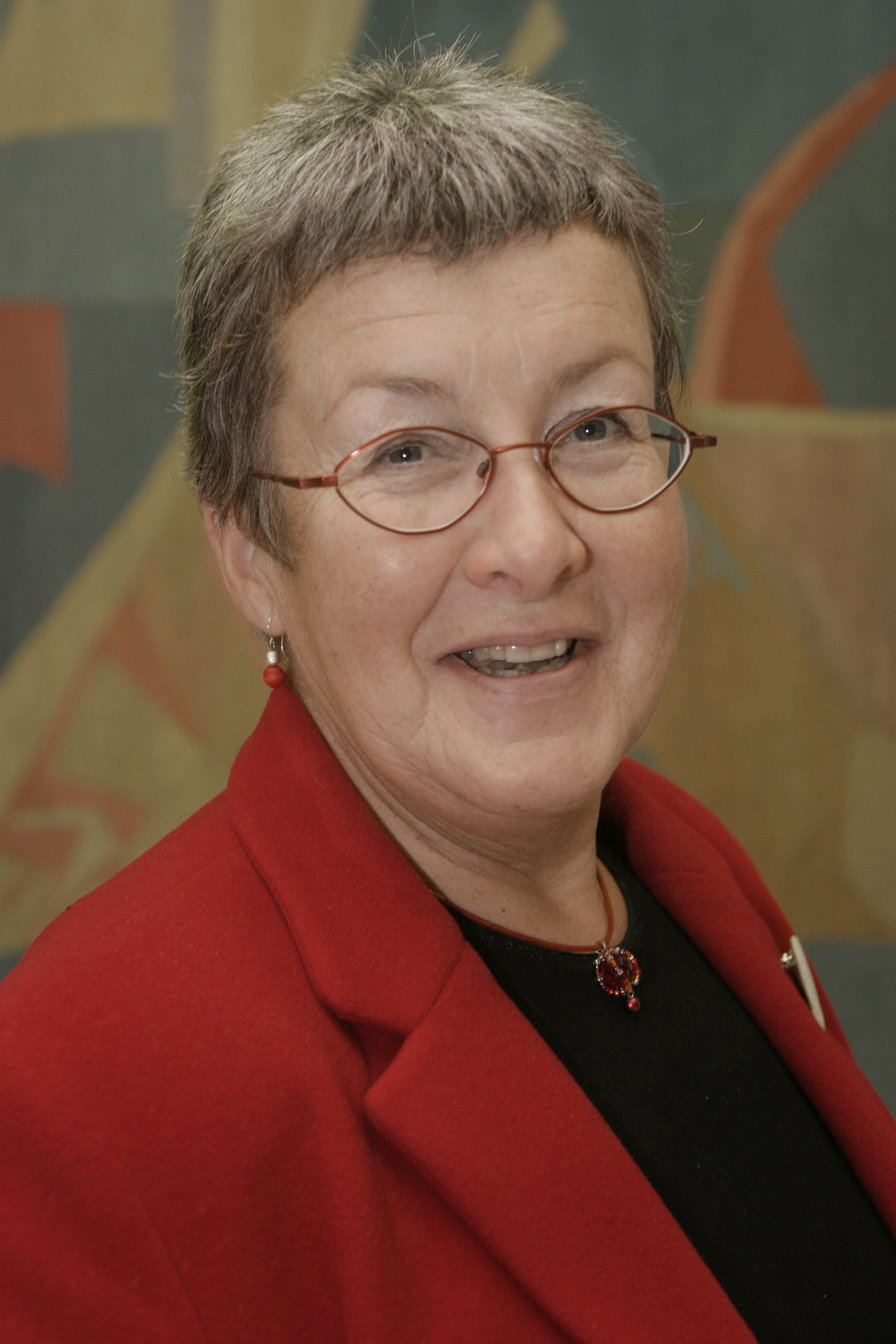
- Carlström in 2003
- Born: 1946 (age 79–80)
- Occupation: Politician
- Known for: Member of the Riksdag

Marianne Carlström (born 1946) is a Swedish Social Democratic Party politician. She served as a member of the Riksdag from the constituency Göteborgs kommun from 1987 to 2006.
