= Hans Rothenberg =

Swedish politician

Rothenberg presenting himself at the Gothenburg bookfair 2012.

Hans Rothenberg, born 1961, is a business development specialist and a member of the Swedish Parliament for the Moderate Party. He is member of the Committee on Industry and Trade and substitute to the Committee on Cultural Affairs. His constituency is the city of Gothenburg.
