= Siw Wittgren-Ahl =

Swedish politician (born 1951)

Siw Wittgren-Ahl (born 1951) is a Swedish social democratic politician. She has been a member of the Riksdag since 1995.
