= Karla López =

Swedish politician (born 1977)

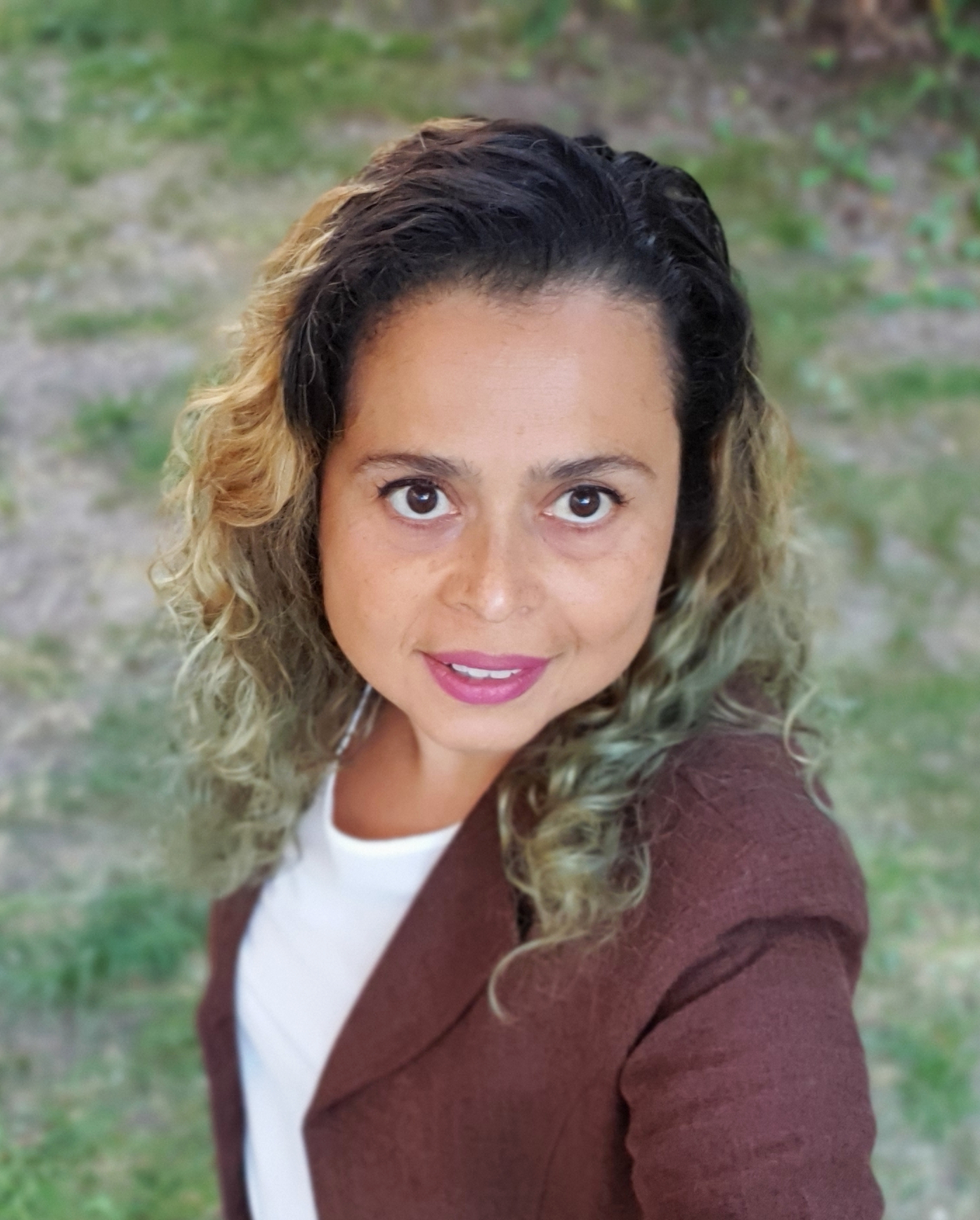

Personal details
- Born: 28 January 1977 (age 49) San Salvador, El Salvador
- Citizenship: Swedish
- Party: Green Party

Karla López (born 28 January 1977) is a former MP for the Swedish Green Party from Gothenburg. Born in El Salvador, she is the first Central American descendant to occupy a position in the Swedish Parliament.

Lopez migrated to Sweden with her parents in 1987 at the age of 10 as a political refugee during the Salvadoran Civil War and grew up in Uddevalla. She sat in parliament for the Green Party 2006–2007, where she was an alternate member of the Committee on Defence and Foreign Affairs Committee, and member of the Composite Foreign Affairs and Defence Committee from 18 October 2007.

Lopez resigned from her parliamentary seat and left the party 13 November 2007, in protest against the party's decision to agree that Sweden should send combat troops to international missions, despite it being contrary to a decision made at the party congress. At that time, Swedish combat troops were deployed in Afghanistan as part of the NATO-led ISAF (International Security Assistance Force).

In 2010, López started a company called Karlimar that sells organic clothing.
