= Axel Darvik =

Swedish liberal politician (born 1982)

City Commissioner of Gothenburg
- Incumbent
- Assumed office 2021

Member of the City Executive Board of Gothenburg
- Incumbent
- Assumed office 29 January 2024

Member of the Riksdag
- In office 30 September 2002 – 2 October 2006
- Constituency: Gothenburg Municipality

Personal details
- Born: June 26, 1982 (age 43)
- Political party: Liberals (Sweden)
- Education: Chalmers University of Technology (MSc, Industrial Engineering and Management, 2012)

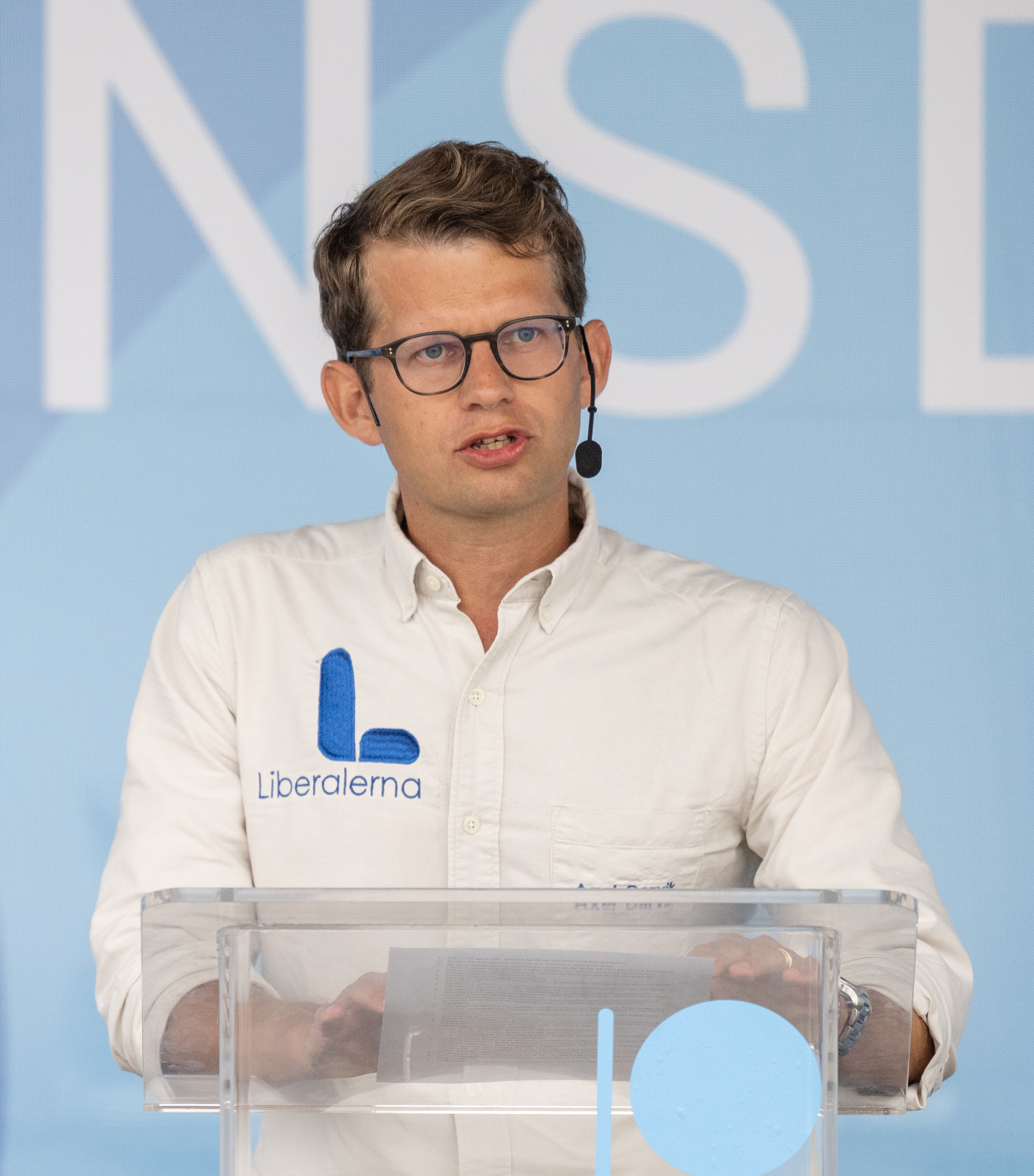
Axel Darvik speaking at an event in 2022

Carl Axel Mikael Darvik (born 26 June 1982) is a Swedish liberal politician and engineer. He served as a Member of the Riksdag for Gothenburg Municipality between 2002 and 2006 for the Liberal Party, and since 2021 he has been a city commissioner (kommunalråd) in Gothenburg.

== Political career ==
=== Riksdag (2002–2006) ===
Darvik was elected to the Riksdag in the 2002 Swedish general election. He represented the Gothenburg Municipality constituency and served as a deputy member of the Committee on Education and the Committee on Cultural Affairs.

=== City of Gothenburg (2021– ) ===
In early 2021 Darvik was appointed city commissioner responsible for primary education and served as chair of the Primary School Committee (grundskolenämnden). After the 2022 change of power in Gothenburg he continued as an opposition city commissioner. As of 2024–2026 he is a member of the City Executive Board, its working committee and the personnel committee, and Gothenburg’s representative in the Eurocities Digital Forum.

== Policy issues and debate ==
As school commissioner in 2021, Darvik fronted the launch of a municipal Teacher Academy to support professional development for teachers in Gothenburg’s compulsory schools.

In 2021 Gothenburg withheld municipal funding to the independent school Römosseskolan amid concerns over governance and leadership suitability. The Swedish Schools Inspectorate later revoked the school’s authorisation; in 2022 the Court of Appeal (Kammarrätten) upheld the revocation.

In 2024 Darvik and the Liberal Party in Gothenburg appealed a municipal decision to boycott goods from certain states; the Administrative Court (Förvaltningsrätten) first suspended and later annulled the decision, holding that such a boycott constituted an impermissible foreign-policy statement at municipal level.

In 2025 Darvik pressed for greater transparency regarding the controversial Karlastaden property deal, requesting access to valuation documents; the municipal housing group Framtiden AB declined his request citing potential harm to the company.

== Party organisation ==
Darvik was elected to the Liberal Party’s national executive committee (partistyrelsen) at the 2019 party congress and subsequently formed part of the party leadership constituted after the congress.

== Education and professional life ==
Darvik holds an MSc in Industrial Engineering and Management from the Chalmers University of Technology (2012).
