= Rödbo =

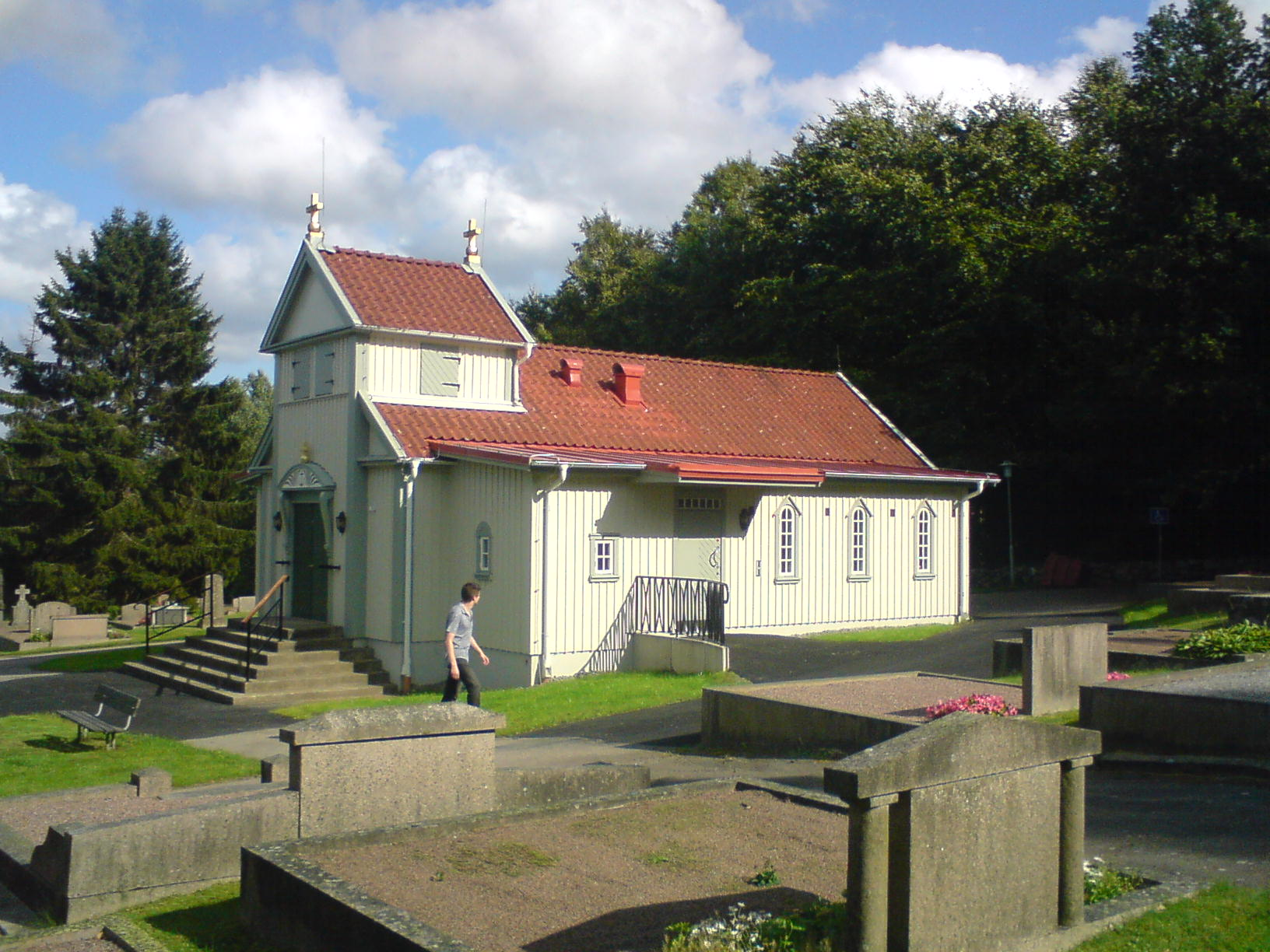
- Rödbo church

- Location within Västra Götaland Location within Sweden
- Coordinates: 57°51′N 11°57′E
- Country: Sweden
- Province: Bohuslän
- County: Västra Götaland County
- Municipality: Göteborg Municipality

Area
  - Total: 0.41 km^{2} (0.16 sq mi)

Population (31 December 2010)
  - Total: 278
  - Density: 686/km^{2} (1,780/sq mi)
- Time zone: UTC+1 (CET)
  - Summer (DST): UTC+2 (CEST)

Rödbo is a locality situated in Gothenburg Municipality, Västra Götaland County, Sweden. It had 278 inhabitants in 2010.
