= Björlanda =

- Location within Västra Götaland Location within Sweden
- Coordinates: 57°46′N 11°50′E
- Country: Sweden
- Province: Bohuslän
- County: Västra Götaland County
- Municipality: Göteborg Municipality

Area
  - Total: 0.89 km^{2} (0.34 sq mi)

Population (31 December 2010)
  - Total: 608
  - Density: 685/km^{2} (1,770/sq mi)
- Time zone: UTC+1 (CET)
  - Summer (DST): UTC+2 (CEST)

Björlanda is a locality situated in Gothenburg Municipality, Västra Götaland County, Sweden. It had 608 inhabitants in 2010.

The Björlanda Church was built in the 14th century.
