= Lise Nordin =

Swedish politician (born 1982)

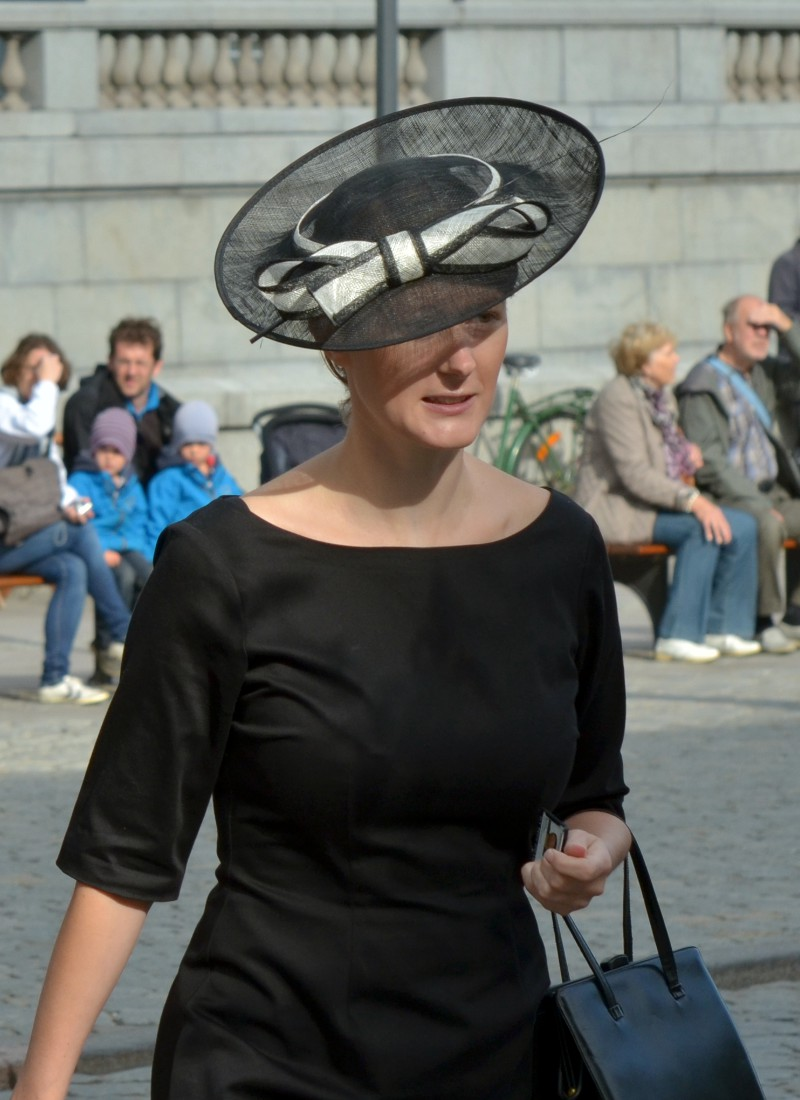
Lise Nordin (2012)

Lise Nordin (born 20 October 1982) is a Swedish politician and member of the Riksdag for the Swedish Green Party (Miljöpartiet). She is spokesperson for the party regarding energy politics since 2010.
