= Claes Roxbergh =

Swedish politician (born 1945)

Claes Roxbergh (born 1945) is a Swedish Green Party politician, member of the Riksdag 1988–1991, 1994 and finally 2002–2006. He was chairman of the Committee on Transport and Communications at the time he announced he would not be running for re-election. After leaving politics, he began working part-time in Skanska's environmental department.
