= Eva Flyborg =

Swedish politician (born 1963)

Member of the Riksdag
- In office 3 October 1994 – 29 September 2014
- Constituency: Gothenburg Municipality

Member of Gothenburg City Council
- Incumbent
- Assumed office 2018
- Constituency: Gothenburg

Personal details
- Born: October 4, 1963 (age 61) Gothenburg, Sweden
- Political party: Liberals (Sweden)

Eva Flyborg (born 4 October 1963) is a Swedish politician for the Liberal Party (Liberalerna). She served as a Member of the Swedish Parliament (Riksdag) from 1994 to 2014. Later she held local political roles in Gothenburg, including chairing the Traffic and Communication Committee between 2018 and 2022.

== Political career ==
Flyborg was first elected to the Riksdag in 1994, representing Gothenburg Municipality. She served for five consecutive terms, until choosing not to stand for re-election in 2014.

During her time in parliament, she was a member of several committees, including the Transport and Communications Committee and the Education Committee.

After her national tenure, Flyborg became active in municipal politics in Gothenburg. In 2018 she was elected to the Gothenburg City Council and in the same year became chair of the Traffic and Communication Committee. She remained in that role until 2022.

== Other activities ==
Flyborg has been a vocal advocate for liberal education policy, urban mobility, and the preservation of public transport in Gothenburg. She has also been involved in several boards and organizations affiliated with infrastructure and regional planning.

== Personal life and background ==
Flyborg was born and raised in Gothenburg, Sweden. Before her national political career, she had various roles in municipal party structures and local governance.
