= Värmland County (Riksdag constituency) =

Swedish electoral district

- Värmlands Län
- Constituency for the Riksdag
- Location of Värmland County within Sweden
- County: Värmland
- Population: 283,028 (2025)
- Electorate: 219,440 (2026)
- Area: 21,899 km^{2} (2026)

Current constituency
- Created: 1970
- Seats: List (Note: Constituency seats only.): 9 (2010–present); 10 (1991–2010); 11 (1970–1991)
- Member of the Riksdag: List: Daniel Bäckström (C); Lotta Björklund (M); Mikael Dahlqvist (S); Runar Filper (SD); Robin Lennartsson (SD); Kjell-Arne Ottosson (KD); Magnus Resare (M); Sofia Skönnbrink (S); Peter Söderström (S); Håkan Svenneling (V)
- Created from: Värmland County

Värmland County (Swedish: Värmlands Län) is one of the 29 multi-member constituencies of the Riksdag, the national legislature of Sweden. The constituency was established in 1970 when the Riksdag changed from a bicameral legislature to a unicameral legislature. It is conterminous with the county of Värmland. The constituency currently elects nine of the 349 members of the Riksdag using the open party-list proportional representation electoral system. At the 2026 general election it had 219,440 registered electors.

== Electoral system ==
Värmland County currently elects nine of the 349 members of the Riksdag using the open party-list proportional representation electoral system. Constituency seats are allocated using the modified Sainte-Laguë method. Only parties that reach the 4% national threshold and parties that receive at least 12% of the vote in the constituency compete for constituency seats. Supplementary levelling seats may also be allocated at the constituency level to parties that reach the 4% national threshold.

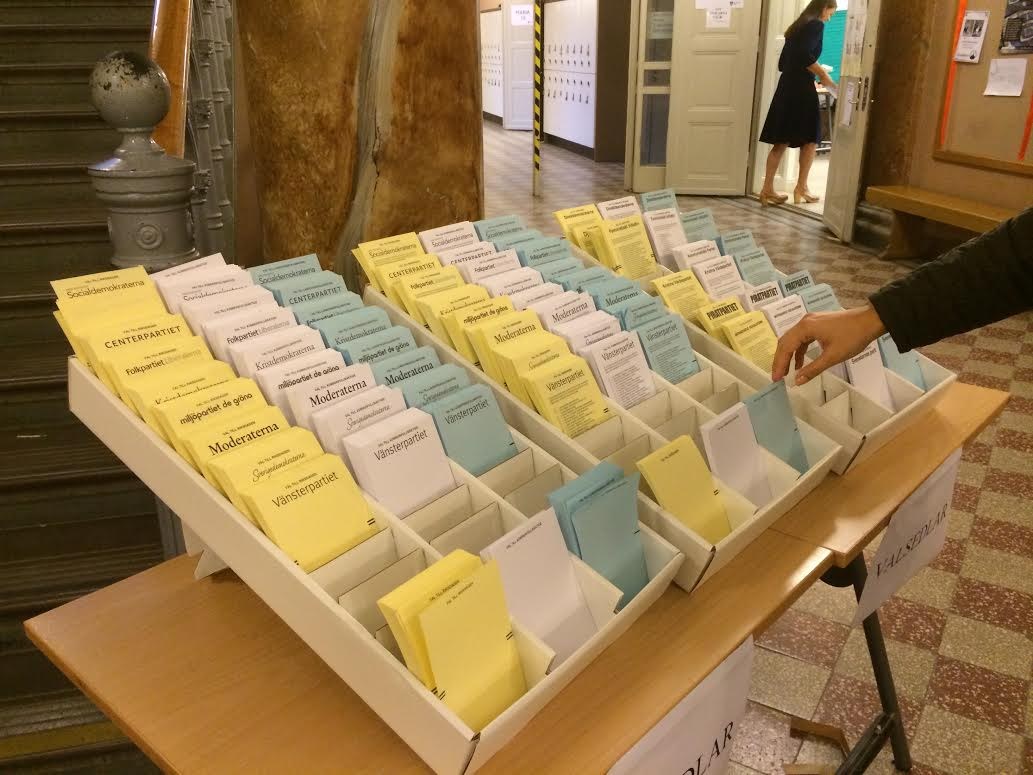
A selection of ballot papers available for voters at the 2014 general election in Stockholm - yellow for the Riksdag, blue for the regional council and white for the municipal council

Prior to 1997 voters could cast any ballot paper they wanted, though it had to contain the name of a party and the name of at least one candidate nominated by that party in the constituency. It was common for parties to hand out ballot papers with their name and list of candidates at the entrance of polling stations. Voters could delete the names of candidates or write-in the names of other candidates but in practice these options weren't used enough by voters to have any significant impact on the results and consequently elections operated as a closed system.

Since 1997, elections in Sweden follow the French model in having separate ballot papers for each party/list in a constituency. There are two ballot papers for each party - a party ballot paper (partivalsedel) with just the name of the party and a name ballot paper (namnvalsedel) with the name of the party and its list of candidates. There are also blank ballot papers (blank valsedel). Voters can initially pick as many ballot papers as they wish and then, in the secrecy of the voting booth, they select a single ballot paper of their choice. If they chose a name ballot paper they have the option of casting a preferential vote for one of their chosen party's candidates. If they chose a blank ballot paper they can write the name of any party including unregistered parties and, optionally, they can write the name of any person as their preferred candidate, even one that does not belong to their chosen party. They then place their chosen ballot paper in an envelope which is placed in the ballot box, discarding all other ballot papers they picked.

Seats won by each party/list in a constituency are allocated to its candidates in order of preference votes (a personal mandate), provided that the candidate has received at least 8% of votes cast for their party in the constituency (5% since January 2011). Any unfilled seats are then allocated to the party's remaining candidates in the order they appear on the party list (a party mandate).

== Election results ==
=== Summary ===
Election	Left V / VPK			Social Democrats S			Greens MP			Centre C			Liberals L / FP / F			Moderates M			Christian Democrats KD / KDS			Sweden Democrats SD		
Election	Votes	%	Seats	Votes	%	Seats	Votes	%	Seats	Votes	%	Seats	Votes	%	Seats	Votes	%	Seats	Votes	%	Seats	Votes	%	Seats
2026	10,740	5.81%	0	57,395	31.06%	3	8,064	4.36%	0	11,185	6.05%	1	8,208	4.44%	0	37,149	20.10%	2	12,668	6.86%	1	36,422	19.71%	2
2022	9,126	5.01%	0	63,034	34.59%	4	6,635	3.64%	0	11,557	6.34%	1	6,766	3.71%	0	31,068	17.05%	2	10,590	5.81%	0	41,555	22.80%	2
2018	12,779	6.95%	1	62,369	33.90%	3	6,133	3.33%	0	17,071	9.28%	1	8,168	4.44%	0	30,219	16.43%	2	11,657	6.34%	0	33,118	18.00%	2
2014	9,517	5.23%	0	71,173	39.09%	5	9,398	5.16%	0	13,521	7.43%	1	7,531	4.14%	0	35,687	19.60%	2	7,263	3.99%	0	22,978	12.62%	1
2010	10,231	5.77%	0	68,520	38.66%	5	9,997	5.64%	0	13,379	7.55%	1	10,652	6.01%	0	45,578	25.72%	3	8,312	4.69%	0	8,502	4.80%	0
2006	10,810	6.42%	1	70,754	42.01%	5	6,519	3.87%	0	16,808	9.98%	1	10,061	5.97%	1	35,201	20.90%	2	9,823	5.83%	0	4,825	2.86%	0
2002	14,361	8.68%	1	71,715	43.36%	5	6,608	3.99%	0	15,161	9.17%	1	18,963	11.46%	1	20,499	12.39%	1	13,406	8.10%	1	2,268	1.37%	0
1998	23,894	14.08%	2	69,674	41.05%	5	6,910	4.07%	0	10,815	6.37%	0	6,828	4.02%	0	31,146	18.35%	2	18,219	10.73%	1			
1994	12,658	6.84%	1	92,052	49.72%	6	8,071	4.36%	0	17,319	9.35%	1	11,423	6.17%	0	34,455	18.61%	2	6,211	3.35%	0			
1991	8,546	4.62%	0	79,199	42.85%	5	4,862	2.63%	0	19,833	10.73%	1	13,851	7.49%	1	33,124	17.92%	2	11,585	6.27%	0			
1988	9,914	5.43%	0	89,678	49.16%	6	8,305	4.55%	0	25,639	14.05%	2	18,489	10.14%	1	26,840	14.71%	2	3,364	1.84%	0			
1985	9,344	4.84%	0	95,203	49.36%	6	2,683	1.39%	0	26,111	13.54%	2	23,398	12.13%	1	35,914	18.62%	2	with C					
1982	9,364	4.77%	0	98,986	50.40%	6	2,757	1.40%	0	33,335	16.97%	2	10,380	5.28%	0	39,268	19.99%	3	2,087	1.06%	0			
1979	9,507	4.86%	0	93,306	47.68%	6				39,607	20.24%	2	16,848	8.61%	1	33,749	17.24%	2	1,477	0.75%	0			
1976	7,843	4.00%	0	90,503	46.13%	5				50,630	25.81%	3	19,286	9.83%	1	25,918	13.21%	2	1,466	0.75%	0			
1973	9,261	4.91%	0	91,054	48.29%	6				49,121	26.05%	3	16,658	8.83%	1	19,893	10.55%	1	1,798	0.95%	0			
1970	8,920	4.85%	0	93,739	51.01%	6				38,436	20.92%	3	22,847	12.43%	1	17,243	9.38%	1	2,099	1.14%	0			

(Excludes levelling seats. Figures in italics represent alliances/joint lists.)

=== Detailed ===
Party has received at least 4% of the vote nationally and is entitled to compete for constituency seats.

==== 2020s ====
===== 2026 =====
Results of the 2026 general election held on 13 September 2026:

Party		Votes per municipality																Total votes	%	Seats		
Party		Årjäng	Arvika	Eda	Filip- stad	Fors- haga	Grums	Hag- fors	Ham- marö	Karl- stad	Kil	Kristine- hamn	Munk- fors	Säffle	Stor- fors	Sunne	Torsby	Total votes	%	Con.	Lev.	Tot.
Swedish Social Democratic Party	S	1,183	5,261	1,273	1,941	2,464	1,898	2,557	3,570	21,463	2,335	5,135	858	2,472	814	2,093	2,078	57,395	31.06%	3	0	3
Moderate Party	M	969	3,327	803	874	1,247	950	960	2,783	14,752	1,654	2,851	305	1,797	425	2,027	1,425	37,149	20.10%	2	0	2
Sweden Democrats	SD	1,549	3,264	1,226	1,649	1,763	1,503	1,760	1,616	9,801	1,867	3,275	493	2,462	666	1,842	1,686	36,422	19.71%	2	0	2
Christian Democrats	KD	940	1,068	423	300	578	366	404	764	4,053	581	963	113	816	149	622	528	12,668	6.86%	1	0	1
Centre Party	C	313	870	188	171	389	242	252	846	4,453	475	852	99	708	109	827	391	11,185	6.05%	1	0	1
Left Party	V	196	921	162	380	349	249	322	397	5,076	334	1,059	124	441	104	363	263	10,740	5.81%	0	1	1
Liberals	L	295	605	144	174	265	188	222	680	3,257	355	804	74	385	105	403	252	8,208	4.44%	0	0	0
Green Party	MP	106	900	92	124	279	137	156	558	3,905	308	620	70	268	54	308	179	8,064	4.36%	0	0	0
Örebro Party	ÖP	28	123	27	84	64	57	39	62	375	76	129	18	58	36	37	53	1,266	0.69%	0	0	0
Alternative for Sweden	AfS	21	51	9	42	43	37	35	39	224	47	54	12	50	7	37	47	755	0.41%	0	0	0
Ambition Sweden	AS	7	18	8	4	10	12	10	11	86	12	18	6	22	5	14	29	272	0.15%	0	0	0
Christian Values Party	KrVP	4	16	10	4	11	5	4	4	48	6	26	4	9	10	26	3	190	0.10%	0	0	0
Pirate Party	PP	3	11	4	3	6	2	5	8	75	12	10	0	2	1	4	3	149	0.08%	0	0	0
Human Rights and Democracy	MoD	4	13	1	0	5	9	8	8	43	4	8	2	6	0	11	4	126	0.07%	0	0	0
Citizens' Coalition	MED	1	2	0	0	1	2	2	3	27	2	0	1	3	1	5	1	51	0.03%	0	0	0
United Voice	ER	0	2	0	2	2	1	5	0	14	0	3	1	0	0	0	0	30	0.02%	0	0	0
Communist Party of Sweden	SKP	1	1	0	4	3	0	2	2	11	0	2	0	1	0	0	0	27	0.01%	0	0	0
Direct Democrats	DD	0	1	0	0	1	0	1	0	7	1	3	0	0	0	1	1	16	0.01%	0	0	0
Nordic Resistance Movement	NMR	1	0	0	1	2	0	0	1	6	0	0	0	1	0	0	0	12	0.01%	0	0	0
Independent Rural Party	LPo	0	1	0	0	2	0	0	0	5	0	0	0	0	1	0	1	10	0.01%	0	0	0
Turning Point Party	PV	0	0	0	0	0	0	3	0	3	0	1	0	0	0	0	0	7	0.00%	0	0	0
Volt Sweden	Volt	0	1	0	0	0	0	2	0	3	0	0	0	0	0	1	0	7	0.00%	0	0	0
The Push Buttons	Kn	0	0	0	0	0	0	0	0	4	0	2	0	0	0	0	0	6	0.00%	0	0	0
Communist Party	K	0	1	0	0	0	0	0	1	1	0	1	0	0	0	0	0	4	0.00%	0	0	0
Classical Liberal Party	KLP	0	0	0	0	0	0	1	0	1	0	0	0	1	0	0	0	3	0.00%	0	0	0
Donald Duck Party		0	0	0	0	1	0	0	0	1	0	0	1	0	0	0	0	3	0.00%	0	0	0
Nuance Party	PNy	0	0	0	0	0	0	0	0	3	0	0	0	0	0	0	0	3	0.00%	0	0	0
Unity	ENH	0	1	0	1	0	0	0	0	1	0	0	0	0	0	0	0	3	0.00%	0	0	0
Free Wermland		0	0	0	0	0	0	0	0	2	0	0	0	0	0	0	0	2	0.00%	0	0	0
Neutral Party		0	0	0	0	0	2	0	0	0	0	0	0	0	0	0	0	2	0.00%	0	0	0
99 Black Balloons		0	0	0	0	0	0	1	0	0	0	0	0	0	0	0	0	1	0.00%	0	0	0
AI Party		0	0	0	0	0	0	0	0	0	0	0	0	1	0	0	0	1	0.00%	0	0	0
Friends of Hemp		0	1	0	0	0	0	0	0	0	0	0	0	0	0	0	0	1	0.00%	0	0	0
Knowledge-Democratic Party		0	0	0	0	0	0	1	0	0	0	0	0	0	0	0	0	1	0.00%	0	0	0
NY Reform	NR	0	0	0	0	0	0	0	0	0	0	0	0	0	0	0	1	1	0.00%	0	0	0
Pax		0	0	0	0	0	1	0	0	0	0	0	0	0	0	0	0	1	0.00%	0	0	0
Valid votes		5,621	16,459	4,370	5,758	7,485	5,661	6,752	11,353	67,700	8,069	15,816	2,181	9,503	2,487	8,621	6,945	184,781	100.00%	9	1	10
Blank votes		57	203	38	89	78	71	113	96	588	113	205	23	109	35	117	90	2,025	1.08%			
Rejected votes – unregistered parties		0	2	0	1	0	2	1	3	13	1	0	0	3	0	1	2	29	0.02%			
Rejected votes – other		2	16	3	3	5	2	12	10	51	12	7	1	8	1	9	3	145	0.08%			
Total polled		5,680	16,680	4,411	5,851	7,568	5,736	6,878	11,462	68,352	8,195	16,028	2,205	9,623	2,523	8,748	7,040	186,980	85.21%			
Registered electors		6,910	19,740	5,497	7,410	8,710	6,927	8,429	12,675	78,923	9,332	18,880	2,681	11,483	2,986	10,238	8,619	219,440				
Turnout		82.20%	84.50%	80.24%	78.96%	86.89%	82.81%	81.60%	90.43%	86.61%	87.82%	84.89%	82.25%	83.80%	84.49%	85.45%	81.68%	85.21%				

The following candidates were elected:

- Constituency seats (personal mandates) - Daniel Bäckström (C), 745 votes; Pål Jonson (M), 4,619 votes; and Kjell-Arne Ottosson (KD), 677 votes.
- Constituency seats (party mandates) - Mikael Dahlqvist (S), 1,456 votes; Runar Filper (SD), 105 votes; Robin Lennartsson (SD), 136 votes; Magnus Resare (M), 537 votes; Sofia Skönnbrink (S), 963 votes; and Peter Söderström (S), 1,179 votes.
- Levelling seats (personal mandates) - Håkan Svenneling (V), 807 votes.

===== 2022 =====
Results of the 2022 general election held on 11 September 2022:

Party		Votes per municipality																Total votes	%	Seats		
Party		Årjäng	Arvika	Eda	Filip- stad	Fors- haga	Grums	Hag- fors	Ham- marö	Karl- stad	Kil	Kristine- hamn	Munk- fors	Säffle	Stor- fors	Sunne	Torsby	Total votes	%	Con.	Lev.	Tot.
Swedish Social Democratic Party	S	1,341	5,796	1,441	2,249	2,861	2,178	3,113	4,114	22,067	2,603	5,776	991	2,744	938	2,468	2,354	63,034	34.59%	4	0	4
Sweden Democrats	SD	1,714	3,859	1,292	1,863	2,023	1,693	1,993	1,776	10,961	2,234	3,690	560	2,869	802	2,150	2,076	41,555	22.80%	2	0	2
Moderate Party	M	707	2,804	607	891	1,079	820	678	2,269	12,409	1,326	2,361	232	1,633	365	1,723	1,164	31,068	17.05%	2	0	2
Centre Party	C	392	991	267	188	379	294	307	758	4,116	525	945	125	887	120	839	424	11,557	6.34%	1	0	1
Christian Democrats	KD	998	920	395	303	448	251	360	579	3,040	446	800	99	735	113	643	460	10,590	5.81%	0	1	1
Left Party	V	141	901	131	315	322	248	396	372	3,910	309	912	115	348	112	295	299	9,126	5.01%	0	1	1
Liberals	L	158	484	92	150	177	102	152	598	2,999	273	730	55	266	53	309	168	6,766	3.71%	0	0	0
Green Party	MP	110	693	59	100	210	104	127	483	3,243	272	510	47	203	54	272	148	6,635	3.64%	0	0	0
Alternative for Sweden	AfS	13	30	5	28	37	21	26	27	156	21	24	10	17	9	18	21	463	0.25%	0	0	0
Citizens' Coalition	MED	5	15	5	6	10	16	5	21	95	10	17	3	24	3	11	11	257	0.14%	0	0	0
Pirate Party	PP	0	23	1	8	5	4	3	7	111	4	20	1	4	3	7	6	207	0.11%	0	0	0
Nuance Party	PNy	2	6	0	1	0	3	5	5	108	4	10	0	18	0	22	2	186	0.10%	0	0	0
The Push Buttons	Kn	4	7	4	4	6	7	8	15	59	3	37	0	3	9	11	9	186	0.10%	0	0	0
Christian Values Party	KrVP	12	17	4	2	10	0	1	3	29	8	17	0	8	6	4	2	123	0.07%	0	0	0
Human Rights and Democracy	MoD	0	12	4	0	4	3	14	12	40	2	10	3	6	0	3	7	120	0.07%	0	0	0
Independent Rural Party	LPo	5	7	5	14	3	0	11	0	3	1	1	3	12	7	4	8	84	0.05%	0	0	0
Feminist Initiative	FI	1	7	2	2	3	1	0	3	27	1	7	2	2	1	5	3	67	0.04%	0	0	0
Direct Democrats	DD	1	9	1	0	1	2	0	2	17	1	11	0	0	0	4	4	53	0.03%	0	0	0
Unity	ENH	0	1	2	0	0	1	4	1	9	0	3	0	0	1	5	3	30	0.02%	0	0	0
Nordic Resistance Movement	NMR	1	0	0	1	0	0	3	1	8	0	2	1	3	0	0	3	23	0.01%	0	0	0
Communist Party of Sweden	SKP	0	6	1	1	1	0	0	3	7	0	2	1	0	0	0	0	22	0.01%	0	0	0
Climate Alliance	KA	2	3	0	1	1	0	1	1	6	0	0	1	1	0	3	0	20	0.01%	0	0	0
Basic Income Party	BASIP	0	0	1	0	0	1	1	0	5	0	3	1	0	1	0	0	13	0.01%	0	0	0
Classical Liberal Party	KLP	0	0	0	1	0	0	1	0	6	0	1	0	1	0	1	1	12	0.01%	0	0	0
Socialist Welfare Party	S-V	0	1	0	4	0	0	0	0	2	0	0	0	1	0	0	0	8	0.00%	0	0	0
Turning Point Party	PV	0	0	0	0	0	0	0	1	1	1	1	0	0	0	0	0	4	0.00%	0	0	0
Evil Chicken Party	OKP	0	0	0	0	0	0	0	0	0	0	0	0	1	0	0	2	3	0.00%	0	0	0
Scania Party	SKÅ	0	0	0	0	1	0	0	0	2	0	0	0	0	0	0	0	3	0.00%	0	0	0
Donald Duck Party		0	0	0	0	1	0	0	0	1	0	0	0	0	0	0	0	2	0.00%	0	0	0
Free Wermland		0	0	0	0	0	0	0	1	1	0	0	0	0	0	0	0	2	0.00%	0	0	0
Now That Will Be Enough		0	0	0	0	0	0	0	0	0	0	0	0	0	0	0	2	2	0.00%	0	0	0
Sweden Out of the EU/ Free Justice Party	FRP	0	1	1	0	0	0	0	0	0	0	0	0	0	0	0	0	2	0.00%	0	0	0
European Workers Party	EAP	0	0	0	0	0	0	0	0	1	0	0	0	0	0	0	0	1	0.00%	0	0	0
Freedom Party		0	0	0	0	0	0	0	0	1	0	0	0	0	0	0	0	1	0.00%	0	0	0
Hard Line Sweden		0	0	0	0	0	0	1	0	0	0	0	0	0	0	0	0	1	0.00%	0	0	0
Love		0	0	0	0	0	0	0	0	1	0	0	0	0	0	0	0	1	0.00%	0	0	0
Referendum Party		0	0	0	0	0	0	0	0	1	0	0	0	0	0	0	0	1	0.00%	0	0	0
Security Party	TRP	0	0	0	0	0	0	0	0	1	0	0	0	0	0	0	0	1	0.00%	0	0	0
The Least Bad Party		0	0	0	0	0	0	0	0	1	0	0	0	0	0	0	0	1	0.00%	0	0	0
Volt Sweden	Volt	0	0	0	0	0	0	0	0	1	0	0	0	0	0	0	0	1	0.00%	0	0	0
Valid votes		5,607	16,593	4,320	6,132	7,582	5,749	7,210	11,052	63,445	8,044	15,890	2,250	9,786	2,597	8,797	7,177	182,231	100.00%	9	2	11
Blank votes		71	209	62	102	78	90	93	96	657	95	187	30	96	28	144	114	2,152	1.17%			
Rejected votes – unregistered parties		1	8	2	3	1	5	1	1	26	1	5	0	1	0	1	3	59	0.03%			
Rejected votes – other		6	8	2	7	11	5	3	9	67	4	7	1	13	5	9	2	159	0.09%			
Total polled		5,685	16,818	4,386	6,244	7,672	5,849	7,307	11,158	64,195	8,144	16,089	2,281	9,896	2,630	8,951	7,296	184,601	85.20%			
Registered electors		6,896	19,885	5,458	7,763	8,824	6,952	8,852	12,337	74,827	9,297	18,945	2,714	11,665	3,092	10,393	8,766	216,666				
Turnout		82.44%	84.58%	80.36%	80.43%	86.94%	84.13%	82.55%	90.44%	85.79%	87.60%	84.92%	84.05%	84.83%	85.06%	86.13%	83.23%	85.20%				

The following candidates were elected:

- Constituency seats (personal mandates) - Daniel Bäckström (C), 978 votes; and Pål Jonson (M), 1,589 votes.
- Constituency seats (party mandates) - Mikael Dahlqvist (S), 747 votes; Runar Filper (SD), 234 votes; Lars Mejern Larsson (S), 2,937 votes; Marléne Lund Kopparklint (M), 802 votes; Charlotte Quensel (SD), 0 votes; Sofia Skönnbrink (S), 708 votes; and Gunilla Svantorp (S), 883 votes.
- Levelling seats (personal mandates) - Kjell-Arne Ottosson (KD), 874 votes; and Håkan Svenneling (V), 725 votes.

Permanent substitutions:

- Gunilla Svantorp (S) resigned on 28 February 2025 and was replaced by Blåvitt Elofsson (S) on 1 March 2025.

==== 2010s ====
===== 2018 =====
Results of the 2018 general election held on 9 September 2018:

Party		Votes per municipality																Total votes	%	Seats		
Party		Årjäng	Arvika	Eda	Filip- stad	Fors- haga	Grums	Hag- fors	Ham- marö	Karl- stad	Kil	Kristine- hamn	Munk- fors	Säffle	Stor- fors	Sunne	Torsby	Total votes	%	Con.	Lev.	Tot.
Swedish Social Democratic Party	S	1,418	5,765	1,457	2,632	2,967	2,422	3,610	3,728	20,097	2,575	5,483	1,221	2,739	1,067	2,524	2,664	62,369	33.90%	3	0	3
Sweden Democrats	SD	1,411	3,145	996	1,636	1,556	1,365	1,369	1,437	8,898	1,716	2,889	361	2,485	590	1,654	1,610	33,118	18.00%	2	0	2
Moderate Party	M	777	2,566	622	767	1,009	750	705	2,182	12,363	1,296	2,567	195	1,541	281	1,551	1,047	30,219	16.43%	2	0	2
Centre Party	C	561	1,601	448	312	599	411	598	959	5,359	823	1,408	190	1,409	219	1,332	842	17,071	9.28%	1	0	1
Left Party	V	206	1,416	251	458	491	324	629	626	4,990	482	1,215	143	453	180	425	490	12,779	6.95%	1	0	1
Christian Democrats	KD	902	961	321	267	470	273	343	717	4,058	469	953	92	671	140	633	387	11,657	6.34%	0	1	1
Liberals	L	196	605	121	153	212	128	177	720	3,585	368	879	68	303	75	347	231	8,168	4.44%	0	1	1
Green Party	MP	101	608	54	91	193	100	102	449	3,068	253	488	32	198	32	225	139	6,133	3.33%	0	0	0
Feminist Initiative	FI	10	157	15	10	24	18	18	29	314	19	43	15	19	4	37	18	750	0.41%	0	0	0
Alternative for Sweden	AfS	17	41	8	22	47	42	17	21	195	22	50	12	33	7	36	12	582	0.32%	0	0	0
Citizens' Coalition	MED	3	18	1	5	8	9	6	15	136	19	26	1	8	2	15	12	284	0.15%	0	0	0
Independent Rural Party	LPo	7	29	16	24	1	13	7	3	17	7	10	2	7	16	9	27	195	0.11%	0	0	0
Direct Democrats	DD	4	16	1	1	8	6	3	5	54	6	15	0	3	3	2	8	135	0.07%	0	0	0
Pirate Party	PP	5	8	4	5	2	4	1	9	45	2	22	2	4	2	6	4	125	0.07%	0	0	0
Unity	ENH	0	7	4	4	4	3	2	8	49	2	12	1	0	2	7	0	105	0.06%	0	0	0
Animals' Party	DjuP	2	2	1	1	0	2	6	4	11	0	21	0	4	0	1	7	62	0.03%	0	0	0
Christian Values Party	KrVP	2	3	2	0	5	0	1	0	25	0	4	0	15	1	0	1	59	0.03%	0	0	0
Nordic Resistance Movement	NMR	1	4	2	4	0	4	7	3	17	0	2	2	3	0	4	5	58	0.03%	0	0	0
Classical Liberal Party	KLP	3	1	0	0	4	2	2	1	28	1	1	1	1	0	1	2	48	0.03%	0	0	0
Basic Income Party	BASIP	0	1	2	0	0	0	1	0	15	0	0	1	0	0	0	1	21	0.01%	0	0	0
Communist Party of Sweden	SKP	0	7	3	0	0	0	2	0	1	0	0	0	0	0	0	1	14	0.01%	0	0	0
Security Party	TRP	0	0	0	0	0	0	0	0	1	0	0	0	0	1	0	0	2	0.00%	0	0	0
Scania Party	SKÅ	0	0	0	0	0	0	0	0	0	0	0	1	0	0	0	0	1	0.00%	0	0	0
Sweden Out of the EU/ Free Justice Party	FRP	0	0	0	0	0	0	1	0	0	0	0	0	0	0	0	0	1	0.00%	0	0	0
Parties not on the ballot	ÖVR	0	0	0	0	0	0	0	0	8	0	0	0	0	0	1	1	10	0.01%	0	0	0
Valid votes		5,626	16,961	4,329	6,392	7,600	5,876	7,607	10,916	63,334	8,060	16,088	2,340	9,896	2,622	8,810	7,509	183,966	100.00%	9	2	11
Blank votes		67	197	72	93	84	66	72	68	513	114	161	24	120	31	131	103	1,916	1.03%			
Rejected votes – unregistered parties		5	3	2	2	4	2	0	1	38	3	5	0	2	0	1	0	68	0.04%			
Rejected votes – other		0	6	2	2	3	5	2	0	29	5	4	0	3	3	4	4	72	0.04%			
Total polled		5,698	17,167	4,405	6,489	7,691	5,949	7,681	10,985	63,914	8,182	16,258	2,364	10,021	2,656	8,946	7,616	186,022	87.26%			
Registered electors		6,768	19,979	5,348	7,763	8,666	6,917	9,134	12,072	71,826	9,195	18,721	2,777	11,622	3,051	10,235	9,099	213,173				
Turnout		84.19%	85.93%	82.37%	83.59%	88.75%	86.01%	84.09%	91.00%	88.98%	88.98%	86.84%	85.13%	86.22%	87.05%	87.41%	83.70%	87.26%				

The following candidates were elected:

- Constituency seats (personal mandates) - Daniel Bäckström (C), 1,593 votes; Pål Jonson (M), 1,549 votes; Lars Mejern Larsson (S), 3,242 votes; and Håkan Svenneling (V), 698 votes.
- Constituency seats (party mandates) - Mikael Dahlqvist (S), 836 votes; Runar Filper (SD), 237 votes; Marléne Lund Kopparklint (M), 713 votes; Patrick Reslow (SD), 0 votes; and Gunilla Svantorp (S), 895 votes.
- Levelling seats (personal mandates) - Kjell-Arne Ottosson (KD), 585 votes; and Arman Teimouri (L), 487 votes.

===== 2014 =====
Results of the 2014 general election held on 14 September 2014:

Party		Votes per municipality																Total votes	%	Seats		
Party		Årjäng	Arvika	Eda	Filip- stad	Fors- haga	Grums	Hag- fors	Ham- marö	Karl- stad	Kil	Kristine- hamn	Munk- fors	Säffle	Stor- fors	Sunne	Torsby	Total votes	%	Con.	Lev.	Tot.
Swedish Social Democratic Party	S	1,641	6,621	1,814	3,081	3,566	2,849	4,299	3,876	21,188	3,094	6,664	1,430	3,361	1,286	3,098	3,305	71,173	39.09%	5	0	5
Moderate Party	M	1,056	2,962	767	821	1,135	900	841	2,651	14,227	1,495	3,122	239	1,931	320	1,902	1,318	35,687	19.60%	2	0	2
Sweden Democrats	SD	1,021	2,320	661	1,422	1,066	885	1,139	857	5,842	1,164	1,846	280	1,805	459	1,120	1,091	22,978	12.62%	1	0	1
Centre Party	C	696	1,328	485	263	496	439	525	523	3,480	679	1,018	152	1,372	171	1,219	675	13,521	7.43%	1	0	1
Left Party	V	176	1,022	217	446	366	254	520	470	3,332	417	906	114	351	162	324	440	9,517	5.23%	0	1	1
Green Party	MP	134	851	86	203	292	170	147	627	4,735	361	820	51	337	59	318	207	9,398	5.16%	0	1	1
Liberal People's Party	FP	312	584	103	151	233	140	165	540	3,244	261	776	87	339	46	357	193	7,531	4.14%	0	0	0
Christian Democrats	KD	446	628	138	141	266	181	165	490	2,760	334	620	49	428	95	307	215	7,263	3.99%	0	0	0
Feminist Initiative	FI	42	405	45	91	117	65	91	181	1,819	120	268	52	125	15	163	98	3,697	2.03%	0	0	0
Pirate Party	PP	9	42	5	20	25	20	22	31	267	31	62	3	29	2	19	20	607	0.33%	0	0	0
Independent Rural Party	LBPo	15	23	16	21	7	5	9	6	11	4	13	3	1	4	7	13	158	0.09%	0	0	0
Unity	ENH	3	8	1	2	7	5	3	4	58	4	17	0	8	1	17	8	146	0.08%	0	0	0
Party of the Swedes	SVP	6	5	1	1	10	14	10	13	39	6	5	1	7	1	4	4	127	0.07%	0	0	0
Animals' Party	DjuP	3	3	1	1	1	1	2	2	21	3	11	0	1	1	6	3	60	0.03%	0	0	0
Christian Values Party	KrVP	0	5	0	0	2	0	0	0	18	1	13	0	10	0	0	2	51	0.03%	0	0	0
Classical Liberal Party	KLP	1	2	0	0	3	1	0	0	17	0	1	0	1	0	0	0	26	0.01%	0	0	0
Direct Democrats		0	0	1	1	2	0	0	0	13	0	3	0	0	0	0	1	21	0.01%	0	0	0
New Party		0	1	0	2	0	0	0	0	0	0	0	0	0	0	0	0	3	0.00%	0	0	0
Swedish Senior Citizen Interest Party	SPI	0	0	0	0	0	0	0	0	2	0	0	0	0	1	0	0	3	0.00%	0	0	0
European Workers Party	EAP	0	0	0	0	0	0	0	0	2	0	0	0	0	0	0	0	2	0.00%	0	0	0
Progressive Party		0	1	0	0	0	0	0	0	0	0	0	0	0	0	0	0	1	0.00%	0	0	0
Reformist Neutral Party	RNP	0	1	0	0	0	0	0	0	0	0	0	0	0	0	0	0	1	0.00%	0	0	0
Parties not on the ballot		4	6	3	4	3	6	5	3	36	8	8	2	3	4	5	6	106	0.06%	0	0	0
Valid votes		5,565	16,818	4,344	6,671	7,597	5,935	7,943	10,274	61,111	7,982	16,173	2,463	10,109	2,627	8,866	7,599	182,077	100.00%	9	2	11
Blank votes		71	208	67	67	68	75	64	66	531	91	147	11	92	32	106	73	1,769	0.96%			
Rejected votes – other		0	3	1	0	2	3	1	4	18	0	2	0	1	1	3	2	41	0.02%			
Total polled		5,636	17,029	4,412	6,738	7,667	6,013	8,008	10,344	61,660	8,073	16,322	2,474	10,202	2,660	8,975	7,674	183,887	86.02%			
Registered electors		6,774	20,131	5,538	8,072	8,779	7,118	9,537	11,493	70,311	9,236	18,947	2,908	11,973	3,079	10,427	9,438	213,761				
Turnout		83.20%	84.59%	79.67%	83.47%	87.33%	84.48%	83.97%	90.00%	87.70%	87.41%	86.15%	85.08%	85.21%	86.39%	86.07%	81.31%	86.02%				

The following candidates were elected:

- Constituency seats (personal mandates) - Daniel Bäckström (C), 1,686 votes; Christian Holm (M), 2,474 votes; and Lars Mejern Larsson (S), 4,850 votes.
- Constituency seats (party mandates) - Mikael Dahlqvist (S), 1,229 votes; Jonas Gunnarsson (S), 1,054 votes; Pia Hallström (M), 1,119 votes; Berit Högman (S), 2,353 votes; Mattias Karlsson (SD), 13 votes; and Gunilla Svantorp (S), 820 votes.
- Levelling seats (personal mandates) - Stina Bergström (MP), 505 votes; and Håkan Svenneling (V), 538 votes.

Permanent substitutions:

- Pia Hallström (M) died on 11 October 2016 and was replaced by Pål Jonson (M) on 12 October 2016.
- Berit Högman (S) resigned on 26 March 2018 and was replaced by Eva-Lena Gustavsson (S) on 27 March 2018.

===== 2010 =====
Results of the 2010 general election held on 19 September 2010:

Party		Votes per municipality																Total votes	%	Seats		
Party		Årjäng	Arvika	Eda	Filip- stad	Fors- haga	Grums	Hag- fors	Ham- marö	Karl- stad	Kil	Kristine- hamn	Munk- fors	Säffle	Stor- fors	Sunne	Torsby	Total votes	%	Con.	Lev.	Tot.
Swedish Social Democratic Party	S	1,662	6,431	1,868	3,544	3,515	2,838	4,405	3,472	19,008	2,907	6,472	1,393	3,350	1,397	2,818	3,440	68,520	38.66%	5	0	5
Moderate Party	M	1,281	3,886	988	1,272	1,571	1,218	1,181	3,114	17,246	1,987	4,049	292	2,736	495	2,374	1,888	45,578	25.72%	3	0	3
Centre Party	C	748	1,377	534	258	444	426	585	444	3,193	695	971	181	1,209	177	1,457	680	13,379	7.55%	1	0	1
Liberal People's Party	FP	389	902	163	278	383	224	333	746	4,347	431	966	147	558	90	424	271	10,652	6.01%	0	1	1
Left Party	V	173	1,076	202	558	399	310	754	490	3,160	396	1,009	165	387	200	391	561	10,231	5.77%	0	1	1
Green Party	MP	158	1,040	121	248	362	215	215	578	4,620	408	869	65	436	96	351	215	9,997	5.64%	0	1	1
Sweden Democrats	SD	346	893	249	423	388	317	439	383	2,399	359	712	122	635	156	353	328	8,502	4.80%	0	0	0
Christian Democrats	KD	440	704	175	193	318	196	177	550	3,068	390	703	71	593	108	384	242	8,312	4.69%	0	0	0
Pirate Party	PP	25	83	22	13	34	32	23	56	346	40	91	11	34	15	39	30	894	0.50%	0	0	0
Rural Democrats		19	13	12	35	9	14	92	5	32	5	11	26	19	9	31	91	423	0.24%	0	0	0
Feminist Initiative	FI	2	58	5	5	4	6	6	38	195	16	25	2	12	3	17	9	403	0.23%	0	0	0
Freedom Party		1	6	0	3	4	5	5	3	31	3	14	5	1	0	5	1	87	0.05%	0	0	0
Party of the Swedes	SVP	1	0	0	0	2	13	1	10	15	0	5	1	5	0	0	2	55	0.03%	0	0	0
Swedish Senior Citizen Interest Party	SPI	0	2	0	5	2	1	0	4	3	4	5	0	0	2	0	0	28	0.02%	0	0	0
Classical Liberal Party	KLP	0	0	0	0	1	0	0	4	8	1	1	0	0	0	1	1	17	0.01%	0	0	0
Unity	ENH	0	0	0	0	0	0	0	0	11	0	1	0	0	0	2	1	15	0.01%	0	0	0
National Democrats	ND	0	0	0	1	1	0	1	0	2	0	3	0	0	0	0	0	8	0.00%	0	0	0
Communist Party of Sweden	SKP	0	0	4	0	0	0	2	0	0	0	0	0	0	0	0	0	6	0.00%	0	0	0
European Workers Party	EAP	0	0	0	0	0	0	0	0	3	0	0	0	0	0	0	0	3	0.00%	0	0	0
Health Care Party	Sjvåp	0	0	0	0	0	0	0	0	1	0	0	0	0	0	1	0	2	0.00%	0	0	0
Socialist Justice Party	RS	0	1	0	0	0	0	0	0	1	0	0	0	0	0	0	0	2	0.00%	0	0	0
Norrland Coalition Party	NorrS	0	0	0	0	0	0	0	0	0	1	0	0	0	0	0	0	1	0.00%	0	0	0
Republicans		0	0	0	1	0	0	0	0	0	0	0	0	0	0	0	0	1	0.00%	0	0	0
Spirits Party		0	0	0	0	0	0	0	0	0	1	0	0	0	0	0	0	1	0.00%	0	0	0
Parties not on the ballot		3	10	5	0	8	4	6	1	20	6	18	3	3	2	3	6	98	0.06%	0	0	0
Valid votes		5,248	16,482	4,348	6,837	7,445	5,819	8,225	9,898	57,709	7,650	15,925	2,484	9,978	2,750	8,651	7,766	177,215	100.00%	9	3	12
Blank votes		99	234	73	84	83	78	80	88	616	97	178	23	134	27	119	102	2,115	1.18%			
Rejected votes – other		1	6	2	4	1	2	0	1	18	1	5	0	1	1	2	1	46	0.03%			
Total polled		5,348	16,722	4,423	6,925	7,529	5,899	8,305	9,987	58,343	7,748	16,108	2,507	10,113	2,778	8,772	7,869	179,376	84.12%			
Registered electors		6,864	20,359	5,632	8,380	8,716	7,193	10,036	11,233	67,761	9,091	19,031	2,989	12,286	3,291	10,513	9,864	213,239				
Turnout		77.91%	82.14%	78.53%	82.64%	86.38%	82.01%	82.75%	88.91%	86.10%	85.23%	84.64%	83.87%	82.31%	84.41%	83.44%	79.77%	84.12%				

The following candidates were elected:

- Constituency seats (personal mandates) - Erik A. Eriksson (C), 1,531 votes; and Jan-Evert Rådhström (M), 4,394 votes.
- Constituency seats (party mandates) - Jonas Gunnarsson (S), 1,216 votes; Pia Hallström (M), 519 votes; Berit Högman (S), 2,461 votes; Christian Holm (M), 1,989 votes; Ann-Kristine Johansson (S), 2,744 votes; Lars Mejern Larsson (S), 3,588 votes; and Gunilla Svantorp (S), 911 votes.
- Levelling seats (personal mandates) - Bengt Berg (V), 975 votes; and Nina Larsson (FP), 1,757 votes.
- Levelling seats (party mandates) - Stina Bergström (MP), 400 votes.

==== 2000s ====
===== 2006 =====
Results of the 2006 general election held on 17 September 2006:

Party		Votes per municipality																Total votes	%	Seats		
Party		Årjäng	Arvika	Eda	Filip- stad	Fors- haga	Grums	Hag- fors	Ham- marö	Karl- stad	Kil	Kristine- hamn	Munk- fors	Säffle	Stor- fors	Sunne	Torsby	Total votes	%	Con.	Lev.	Tot.
Swedish Social Democratic Party	S	1,579	6,497	1,917	3,702	3,598	2,907	4,644	3,804	19,731	2,991	6,595	1,391	3,589	1,444	2,858	3,507	70,754	42.01%	5	0	5
Moderate Party	M	956	2,890	681	917	1,149	913	976	2,265	13,504	1,504	3,111	237	2,015	429	1,979	1,675	35,201	20.90%	2	0	2
Centre Party	C	925	1,746	669	384	538	529	688	510	4,020	787	1,294	241	1,666	232	1,661	918	16,808	9.98%	1	0	1
Left Party	V	230	1,061	205	586	398	356	922	520	3,199	372	1,105	227	409	237	329	654	10,810	6.42%	1	0	1
Liberal People's Party	FP	407	864	149	273	351	184	256	637	4,104	433	972	138	508	99	433	253	10,061	5.97%	1	0	1
Christian Democrats	KD	493	850	256	228	376	302	258	597	3,504	464	839	68	683	125	476	304	9,823	5.83%	0	1	1
Green Party	MP	116	761	87	150	217	131	148	362	2,929	246	547	60	241	61	271	192	6,519	3.87%	0	0	0
Sweden Democrats	SD	144	614	138	204	255	150	306	210	1,218	235	380	79	382	78	205	227	4,825	2.86%	0	0	0
Pirate Party	PP	13	87	29	18	50	40	36	54	354	37	59	14	67	7	28	31	924	0.55%	0	0	0
June List	JL	70	135	74	34	46	24	31	31	197	38	46	12	68	11	49	32	898	0.53%	0	0	0
Feminist Initiative	FI	6	43	4	23	14	21	11	42	306	16	50	12	32	9	21	14	624	0.37%	0	0	0
Swedish Senior Citizen Interest Party	SPI	2	32	8	12	14	13	9	23	394	17	47	3	15	12	13	7	621	0.37%	0	0	0
Health Care Party	Sjvåp	4	5	7	12	16	4	14	11	29	19	48	4	59	8	14	9	263	0.16%	0	0	0
Unity	ENH	0	0	0	0	0	1	4	2	13	1	6	1	3	1	13	11	56	0.03%	0	0	0
New Future	NYF	1	10	0	0	0	0	7	0	12	1	15	0	2	0	0	5	53	0.03%	0	0	0
National Democrats	ND	1	0	0	1	2	0	4	0	8	2	3	0	14	4	0	0	39	0.02%	0	0	0
National Socialist Front	NSF	1	0	0	2	1	6	1	2	9	0	3	0	10	1	0	1	37	0.02%	0	0	0
People's Will		0	0	0	2	0	0	2	5	2	2	4	0	0	1	4	0	22	0.01%	0	0	0
Classical Liberal Party	KLP	0	0	0	0	5	0	0	1	4	0	1	0	0	0	0	0	11	0.01%	0	0	0
Sweden Out of the EU / Free Justice Party	UT/FRP	0	0	0	0	0	7	0	0	1	0	0	0	0	0	0	0	8	0.00%	0	0	0
Unique Party		0	0	0	0	1	0	0	0	2	1	1	0	0	0	0	0	5	0.00%	0	0	0
Communist Party of Sweden	SKP	0	0	0	1	1	0	0	0	1	0	0	0	0	0	0	1	4	0.00%	0	0	0
Socialist Justice Party	RS	0	1	0	0	0	0	0	0	1	0	1	0	0	0	0	1	4	0.00%	0	0	0
Partiet.se		0	2	0	0	0	0	0	0	0	0	0	1	0	0	0	0	3	0.00%	0	0	0
European Workers Party	EAP	0	0	0	0	0	0	0	0	2	0	0	0	0	0	0	0	2	0.00%	0	0	0
Tax Reformists		0	2	0	0	0	0	0	0	0	0	0	0	0	0	0	0	2	0.00%	0	0	0
Nordic Union		0	0	0	1	0	0	0	0	0	0	0	0	0	0	0	0	1	0.00%	0	0	0
Women's Power		0	0	0	1	0	0	0	0	0	0	0	0	0	0	0	0	1	0.00%	0	0	0
Parties not on the ballot		0	8	4	0	1	3	4	2	10	1	4	4	3	2	1	0	47	0.03%	0	0	0
Valid votes		4,948	15,608	4,228	6,551	7,033	5,591	8,321	9,078	53,554	7,167	15,131	2,492	9,766	2,761	8,355	7,842	168,426	100.00%	10	1	11
Blank votes		110	307	81	117	129	98	123	142	968	163	270	45	191	39	162	162	3,107	1.81%			
Rejected votes – other		2	1	4	1	2	0	0	2	19	3	9	0	3	0	4	3	53	0.03%			
Total polled		5,060	15,916	4,313	6,669	7,164	5,689	8,444	9,222	54,541	7,333	15,410	2,537	9,960	2,800	8,521	8,007	171,586	81.26%			
Registered electors		6,867	20,133	5,725	8,613	8,607	7,231	10,566	10,733	65,259	8,903	18,815	3,144	12,461	3,421	10,476	10,204	211,158				
Turnout		73.69%	79.05%	75.34%	77.43%	83.23%	78.68%	79.92%	85.92%	83.58%	82.37%	81.90%	80.69%	79.93%	81.85%	81.34%	78.47%	81.26%				

The following candidates were elected:

- Constituency seats (personal mandates) - Erik A. Eriksson (C), 1,750 votes; Nina Larsson (FP), 1,218 votes; and Jan-Evert Rådhström (M), 3,645 votes.
- Constituency seats (party mandates) - Marie Engström (V), 733 votes; Berit Högman (S), 1,971 votes; Christian Holm (M), 1,497 votes; Ann-Kristine Johansson (S), 2,305 votes; Lars Mejern Larsson (S), 3,096 votes; Marina Pettersson (S), 798 votes; and Tommy Ternemar (S), 796 votes.
- Levelling seats (personal mandates) - Dan Kihlström (KD), 1,076 votes.

===== 2002 =====
Results of the 2002 general election held on 15 September 2002:

Party		Votes per municipality																Total votes	%	Seats		
Party		Årjäng	Arvika	Eda	Filip- stad	Fors- haga	Grums	Hag- fors	Ham- marö	Karl- stad	Kil	Kristine- hamn	Munk- fors	Säffle	Stor- fors	Sunne	Torsby	Total votes	%	Con.	Lev.	Tot.
Swedish Social Democratic Party	S	1,497	6,636	2,154	3,570	3,513	3,006	4,903	4,028	20,485	2,928	6,265	1,527	3,401	1,448	2,874	3,480	71,715	43.36%	5	0	5
Moderate Party	M	500	1,555	382	543	626	482	544	1,229	7,794	954	1,787	158	1,245	255	1,194	1,251	20,499	12.39%	1	0	1
Liberal People's Party	FP	1,378	1,619	355	487	589	318	427	1,156	7,300	799	1,824	180	1,082	211	767	471	18,963	11.46%	1	0	1
Centre Party	C	732	1,356	576	369	511	529	810	346	2,930	702	1,285	221	1,921	201	1,660	1,012	15,161	9.17%	1	0	1
Left Party	V	279	1,424	304	815	550	483	1,180	713	4,093	495	1,419	248	660	287	485	926	14,361	8.68%	1	0	1
Christian Democrats	KD	548	1,193	352	387	490	413	419	662	4,456	685	1,240	106	1,094	200	727	434	13,406	8.10%	1	0	1
Green Party	MP	107	838	114	218	263	116	176	314	2,500	266	638	76	359	84	309	230	6,608	3.99%	0	1	1
Sweden Democrats	SD	35	257	40	95	146	50	101	111	710	109	210	47	104	32	128	93	2,268	1.37%	0	0	0
Swedish Senior Citizen Interest Party	SPI	10	44	13	29	37	33	14	70	713	45	112	6	51	9	13	27	1,226	0.74%	0	0	0
New Future	NYF	5	133	23	32	37	52	28	23	166	8	80	0	72	17	16	41	733	0.44%	0	0	0
Unity	ENH	2	0	0	0	0	0	2	0	7	0	1	0	0	0	0	1	13	0.01%	0	0	0
Socialist Party	SOC.P	0	2	0	0	0	0	0	0	5	0	0	0	0	0	0	1	8	0.00%	0	0	0
Tax Reformists	Sref	0	0	0	0	5	0	0	0	0	0	0	0	0	0	0	0	5	0.00%	0	0	0
European Workers Party	EAP	0	0	0	0	0	0	0	0	3	0	0	0	0	0	0	0	3	0.00%	0	0	0
Socialist Justice Party	RS	0	0	0	0	0	0	0	0	2	0	0	0	0	0	0	0	2	0.00%	0	0	0
Communist League	KommF	0	0	1	0	0	0	0	0	0	0	0	0	0	0	0	0	1	0.00%	0	0	0
The Communists	KOMM	0	1	0	0	0	0	0	0	0	0	0	0	0	0	0	0	1	0.00%	0	0	0
Other parties	ÖVR	15	28	8	87	8	15	11	19	108	10	27	7	65	8	16	8	440	0.27%	0	0	0
Valid votes		5,108	15,086	4,322	6,632	6,775	5,497	8,615	8,671	51,272	7,001	14,888	2,576	10,054	2,752	8,189	7,975	165,413	100.00%	10	1	11
Rejected votes		76	308	67	150	109	97	121	129	893	126	345	34	217	42	115	126	2,955	1.76%			
Total polled		5,184	15,394	4,389	6,782	6,884	5,594	8,736	8,800	52,165	7,127	15,233	2,610	10,271	2,794	8,304	8,101	168,368	79.87%			
Registered electors		6,985	20,146	5,863	8,926	8,514	7,174	10,979	10,491	63,566	8,858	18,748	3,246	12,718	3,512	10,503	10,566	210,795				
Turnout		74.22%	76.41%	74.86%	75.98%	80.86%	77.98%	79.57%	83.88%	82.06%	80.46%	81.25%	80.41%	80.76%	79.56%	79.06%	76.67%	79.87%				

The following candidates were elected:

- Constituency seats (personal mandates) - Viviann Gerdin (C), 2,122 votes; Dan Kihlström (KD), 1,490 votes; Runar Patriksson (FP), 2,709 votes; and Jan-Evert Rådhström (M), 2,861 votes.
- Constituency seats (party mandates) - Marie Engström (V), 1,012 votes; Berit Högman (S), 1,780 votes; Ann-Kristine Johansson (S), 2,595 votes; Jarl Lander (S), 1,422 votes; Marina Pettersson (S), 1,032 votes; and Tommy Ternemar (S), 765 votes.
- Levelling seats (party mandates) - Leif Björnlod (MP), 497 votes.

==== 1990s ====
===== 1998 =====
Results of the 1998 general election held on 20 September 1998:

Party		Votes per municipality																Total votes	%	Seats		
Party		Årjäng	Arvika	Eda	Filip- stad	Fors- haga	Grums	Hag- fors	Ham- marö	Karl- stad	Kil	Kristine- hamn	Munk- fors	Säffle	Stor- fors	Sunne	Torsby	Total votes	%	Con.	Lev.	Tot.
Swedish Social Democratic Party	S	1,512	6,349	2,107	3,695	3,448	2,955	4,861	3,777	18,296	2,637	6,695	1,599	3,944	1,432	2,661	3,706	69,674	41.05%	5	0	5
Moderate Party	M	865	2,474	693	903	1,107	738	886	1,847	11,671	1,401	2,610	228	1,835	454	1,728	1,706	31,146	18.35%	2	0	2
Left Party	V	486	2,226	666	1,488	942	848	1,946	1,185	6,389	862	2,424	460	1,161	499	798	1,514	23,894	14.08%	2	0	2
Christian Democrats	KD	851	1,800	497	466	638	546	638	866	6,031	931	1,580	171	1,424	243	950	587	18,219	10.73%	1	0	1
Centre Party	C	530	984	464	259	379	380	615	174	2,079	545	791	160	1,209	164	1,341	741	10,815	6.37%	0	1	1
Green Party	MP	170	811	160	213	268	162	255	354	2,451	320	614	65	340	91	347	289	6,910	4.07%	0	0	0
Liberal People's Party	FP	637	642	119	250	220	121	156	329	2,345	297	698	81	337	85	327	184	6,828	4.02%	0	1	1
Other parties		40	138	30	79	84	57	54	111	944	95	265	34	88	27	120	71	2,237	1.32%	0	0	0
Valid votes		5,091	15,424	4,736	7,353	7,086	5,807	9,411	8,643	50,206	7,088	15,677	2,798	10,338	2,995	8,272	8,798	169,723	100.00%	10	2	12
Rejected votes		127	386	89	161	133	98	153	171	1,088	153	329	34	232	62	149	143	3,508	2.03%			
Total polled		5,218	15,810	4,825	7,514	7,219	5,905	9,564	8,814	51,294	7,241	16,006	2,832	10,570	3,057	8,421	8,941	173,231	80.97%			
Registered electors		7,215	20,447	6,174	9,562	8,738	7,507	11,579	10,346	61,932	8,842	19,577	3,483	13,261	3,662	10,524	11,100	213,949				
Turnout		72.32%	77.32%	78.15%	78.58%	82.62%	78.66%	82.60%	85.19%	82.82%	81.89%	81.76%	81.31%	79.71%	83.48%	80.02%	80.55%	80.97%				

The following candidates were elected:

- Constituency seats (personal mandates) - Marie Engström (V), 2,012 votes; and Jan-Evert Rådhström (M), 4,113 votes.
- Constituency seats (party mandates) - Sture Arnesson (V), 460 votes; Torgny Danielsson (S), 2,202 votes; Ann-Kristine Johansson (S), 1,458 votes; Dan Kihlström (KD), 390 votes; Jarl Lander (S), 877 votes; Per-Samuel Nisser (M), 1,646 votes; Marina Pettersson (S), 996 votes; and Lisbeth Staaf-Igelström (S), 4,476 votes.
- Levelling seats (personal mandates) - Viviann Gerdin (C), 1,688 votes; and Runar Patriksson (FP), 819 votes.

===== 1994 =====
Results of the 1994 general election held on 18 September 1994:

Party		Votes per municipality																Total votes	%	Seats		
Party		Årjäng	Arvika	Eda	Filip- stad	Fors- haga	Grums	Hag- fors	Ham- marö	Karl- stad	Kil	Kristine- hamn	Munk- fors	Säffle	Stor- fors	Sunne	Torsby	Total votes	%	Con.	Lev.	Tot.
Swedish Social Democratic Party	S	1,919	7,966	2,755	5,426	4,413	3,902	6,897	4,853	23,438	3,519	9,004	2,203	5,206	1,966	3,444	5,141	92,052	49.72%	6	0	6
Moderate Party	M	934	2,843	779	1,047	1,176	839	1,039	1,863	12,803	1,642	2,995	261	2,099	435	1,947	1,753	34,455	18.61%	2	0	2
Centre Party	C	1,454	1,687	758	425	635	595	832	337	3,328	814	1,169	239	1,864	260	1,804	1,118	17,319	9.35%	1	0	1
Left Party	V	251	1,384	364	716	486	429	1,117	611	3,369	435	1,255	251	509	261	370	850	12,658	6.84%	1	0	1
Liberal People's Party	FP	326	1,081	200	358	459	234	314	751	4,355	532	1,197	140	593	160	441	282	11,423	6.17%	0	1	1
Green Party	MP	282	999	216	246	318	260	312	347	2,581	389	732	72	427	101	429	360	8,071	4.36%	0	0	0
Christian Democratic Unity	KDS	372	595	170	145	236	174	198	228	1,994	303	547	59	498	99	364	229	6,211	3.35%	0	0	0
New Democracy	NyD	65	171	55	92	112	99	46	79	560	75	163	20	109	35	91	73	1,845	1.00%	0	0	0
Other parties		48	93	24	49	57	37	27	37	310	71	94	30	80	17	70	67	1,111	0.60%	0	0	0
Valid votes		5,651	16,819	5,321	8,504	7,892	6,569	10,782	9,106	52,738	7,780	17,156	3,275	11,385	3,334	8,960	9,873	185,145	100.00%	10	1	11
Rejected votes		91	287	63	106	100	88	102	111	723	110	222	29	170	39	121	109	2,471	1.32%			
Total polled		5,742	17,106	5,384	8,610	7,992	6,657	10,884	9,217	53,461	7,890	17,378	3,304	11,555	3,373	9,081	9,982	187,616	86.58%			
Registered electors		7,248	20,583	6,379	10,090	9,013	7,681	12,330	10,249	60,733	9,020	19,939	3,744	13,631	3,796	10,718	11,547	216,701				
Turnout		79.22%	83.11%	84.40%	85.33%	88.67%	86.67%	88.27%	89.93%	88.03%	87.47%	87.16%	88.25%	84.77%	88.86%	84.73%	86.45%	86.58%				

The following candidates were elected: Torgny Danielsson (S); Kjell Ericsson (C); Bo Finnkvist (S); Isa Halvarsson (FP); Ann-Kristine Johansson (S); Göthe Knutson (M); Jarl Lander (S); Gullan Lindblad (M); Björn Samuelson (V); Lisbeth Staaf-Igelström (S); and Kristina Svensson (S).

Permanent substitutions:

- Björn Samuelson (V) resigned on 26 September 1996 and was replaced by Marie Engström (V) on 27 September 1996.
- Kristina Svensson (S) resigned on 8 November 1996 and was replaced by Frank Lassen (S) on 9 November 1996.
- Bo Finnkvist (S) resigned on 30 September 1997 and was replaced by Marina Pettersson (S) on 1 October 1997.

===== 1991 =====
Results of the 1991 general election held on 15 September 1991:

Party		Votes per municipality																Total votes	%	Seats		
Party		Årjäng	Arvika	Eda	Filip- stad	Fors- haga	Grums	Hag- fors	Ham- marö	Karl- stad	Kil	Kristine- hamn	Munk- fors	Säffle	Stor- fors	Sunne	Torsby	Total votes	%	Con.	Lev.	Tot.
Swedish Social Democratic Party	S	1,523	6,969	2,487	4,947	3,740	3,486	6,540	4,066	19,397	2,812	7,683	2,095	4,429	1,774	2,791	4,460	79,199	42.85%	5	0	5
Moderate Party	M	937	2,854	734	1,184	1,152	774	1,010	1,704	12,266	1,557	2,744	258	2,080	409	1,796	1,665	33,124	17.92%	2	0	2
Centre Party	C	1,487	1,999	868	503	730	680	1,029	416	3,732	912	1,329	290	2,032	309	2,079	1,438	19,833	10.73%	1	0	1
Liberal People's Party	FP	556	1,340	299	450	570	276	413	807	4,901	607	1,537	178	683	198	572	464	13,851	7.49%	1	0	1
New Democracy	NyD	514	1,127	378	454	549	609	515	546	3,646	654	1,422	117	1,066	249	590	508	12,944	7.00%	1	0	1
Christian Democratic Unity	KDS	588	1,221	355	352	397	327	409	395	3,606	624	1,050	108	896	152	689	416	11,585	6.27%	0	1	1
Left Party	V	127	939	250	532	287	323	872	408	2,166	283	806	204	358	184	188	619	8,546	4.62%	0	1	1
Green Party	MP	157	547	108	192	172	105	201	240	1,725	233	421	54	220	42	222	223	4,862	2.63%	0	0	0
Other parties		10	117	26	52	27	16	36	43	303	33	69	22	53	10	40	18	875	0.47%	0	0	0
Valid votes		5,899	17,113	5,505	8,666	7,624	6,596	11,025	8,625	51,742	7,715	17,061	3,326	11,817	3,327	8,967	9,811	184,819	100.00%	10	2	12
Rejected votes		56	286	74	167	90	76	121	142	710	100	217	33	142	34	106	127	2,481	1.32%			
Total polled		5,955	17,399	5,579	8,833	7,714	6,672	11,146	8,767	52,452	7,815	17,278	3,359	11,959	3,361	9,073	9,938	187,300	86.35%			
Registered electors		7,331	20,672	6,575	10,458	8,736	7,735	12,765	9,753	59,922	8,910	20,023	3,807	14,001	3,813	10,654	11,752	216,907				
Turnout		81.23%	84.17%	84.85%	84.46%	88.30%	86.26%	87.32%	89.89%	87.53%	87.71%	86.29%	88.23%	85.42%	88.15%	85.16%	84.56%	86.35%				

The following candidates were elected: Roine Carlsson (S); Kjell Ericsson (C); Bo Finnkvist (S); Isa Halvarsson (FP); Göthe Knutson (M); Roland Lében (KDS); Gullan Lindblad (M); Magnus Persson (S); Björn Samuelson (V); Lisbeth Staaf-Igelström (S); Kristina Svensson (S); and Jon Peter Wieselgren (NyD).

Permanent substitutions:

- Roine Carlsson (S) resigned on 29 September 1991 and was replaced by Jarl Lander (S) on 30 September 1991.
- Jon Peter Wieselgren (NyD) resigned on 8 January 1992 and was replaced by Arne Jansson (NyD) on 10 January 1992.

==== 1980s ====
===== 1988 =====
Results of the 1988 general election held on 18 September 1988:

Party		Votes per municipality																Total votes	%	Seats		
Party		Årjäng	Arvika	Eda	Filip- stad	Fors- haga	Grums	Hag- fors	Ham- marö	Karl- stad	Kil	Kristine- hamn	Munk- fors	Säffle	Stor- fors	Sunne	Torsby	Total votes	%	Con.	Lev.	Tot.
Swedish Social Democratic Party	S	1,708	7,933	2,902	5,528	4,180	3,793	7,262	4,728	22,246	3,200	8,599	2,351	4,987	1,994	3,234	5,033	89,678	49.16%	6	0	6
Moderate Party	M	784	2,231	588	973	813	608	865	1,340	10,072	1,189	2,340	192	1,717	386	1,424	1,318	26,840	14.71%	2	0	2
Centre Party	C	1,900	2,621	1,100	654	854	888	1,306	580	5,219	1,142	1,785	336	2,555	405	2,619	1,675	25,639	14.05%	2	0	2
Liberal People's Party	FP	575	1,848	392	694	690	416	500	972	6,335	865	2,168	203	1,115	242	830	644	18,489	10.14%	1	0	1
Left Party – Communists	VPK	136	1,058	251	587	329	396	918	526	2,628	316	1,044	187	444	195	201	698	9,914	5.43%	0	1	1
Green Party	MP	250	970	198	370	303	246	415	367	2,617	376	730	95	470	123	353	422	8,305	4.55%	0	0	0
Christian Democratic Unity	KDS	249	322	94	104	146	87	143	75	922	130	353	41	330	51	167	150	3,364	1.84%	0	0	0
Other parties		5	9	5	5	11	8	3	8	81	8	21	7	13	4	5	5	198	0.11%	0	0	0
Valid votes		5,607	16,992	5,530	8,915	7,326	6,442	11,412	8,596	50,120	7,226	17,040	3,412	11,631	3,400	8,833	9,945	182,427	100.00%	11	1	12
Rejected votes		45	208	48	92	75	46	72	98	609	107	206	19	118	25	87	103	1,958	1.06%			
Total polled		5,652	17,200	5,578	9,007	7,401	6,488	11,484	8,694	50,729	7,333	17,246	3,431	11,749	3,425	8,920	10,048	184,385	85.34%			
Registered electors		7,263	20,697	6,658	10,642	8,495	7,658	12,983	9,681	59,137	8,491	20,211	3,864	14,050	3,878	10,517	11,846	216,071				
Turnout		77.82%	83.10%	83.78%	84.64%	87.12%	84.72%	88.45%	89.80%	85.78%	86.36%	85.33%	88.79%	83.62%	88.32%	84.82%	84.82%	85.34%				

The following candidates were elected: Roine Carlsson (S); Kjell Ericsson (C); Bo Finnkvist (S); Isa Halvarsson (FP); Jan Hyttring (C); Göthe Knutson (M); Jarl Lander (S); Gullan Lindblad (M); Magnus Persson (S); Hans Rosengren (S); Björn Samuelson (VPK); and Kristina Svensson (S).

Permanent substitutions:

- Hans Rosengren (S) died on 8 May 1989 and was replaced by Lisbeth Staaf-Igelström (S) on 10 May 1989.

===== 1985 =====
Results of the 1985 general election held on 15 September 1985:

Party		Votes per municipality																Total votes	%	Seats		
Party		Årjäng	Arvika	Eda	Filip- stad	Fors- haga	Grums	Hag- fors	Ham- marö	Karl- stad	Kil	Kristine- hamn	Munk- fors	Säffle	Stor- fors	Sunne	Torsby	Total votes	%	Con.	Lev.	Tot.
Swedish Social Democratic Party	S	1,856	8,308	3,153	5,979	4,375	4,125	7,695	4,782	23,743	3,238	9,395	2,473	5,431	2,144	3,261	5,245	95,203	49.36%	6	0	6
Moderate Party	M	1,283	3,160	812	1,333	1,196	855	1,218	1,623	12,752	1,677	3,137	293	2,433	494	1,905	1,743	35,914	18.62%	2	0	2
Centre Party	C	1,752	2,664	1,152	703	923	899	1,420	417	4,811	1,116	1,967	340	2,875	436	2,779	1,857	26,111	13.54%	2	0	2
Liberal People's Party	FP	1,015	2,617	602	896	793	605	686	1,128	7,672	1,055	2,444	279	1,378	346	1,059	823	23,398	12.13%	1	0	1
Left Party – Communists	VPK	123	988	215	565	310	348	920	481	2,500	286	963	178	373	177	184	733	9,344	4.84%	0	1	1
Green Party	MP	69	329	47	144	79	60	149	140	981	117	193	32	87	28	94	134	2,683	1.39%	0	0	0
Other parties		11	28	13	11	6	7	7	8	79	8	26	4	14	3	4	10	239	0.12%	0	0	0
Valid votes		6,109	18,094	5,994	9,631	7,682	6,899	12,095	8,579	52,538	7,497	18,125	3,599	12,591	3,628	9,286	10,545	192,892	100.00%	11	1	12
Rejected votes		48	154	29	74	58	45	79	53	409	67	131	24	72	17	31	66	1,357	0.70%			
Total polled		6,157	18,248	6,023	9,705	7,740	6,944	12,174	8,632	52,947	7,564	18,256	3,623	12,663	3,645	9,317	10,611	194,249	89.80%			
Registered electors		7,335	20,754	6,805	10,887	8,417	7,748	13,230	9,263	58,536	8,245	20,364	4,000	14,228	3,973	10,484	12,054	216,323				
Turnout		83.94%	87.93%	88.51%	89.14%	91.96%	89.62%	92.02%	93.19%	90.45%	91.74%	89.65%	90.58%	89.00%	91.74%	88.87%	88.03%	89.80%				

The following candidates were elected: Roine Carlsson (S); Karl Erik Eriksson (FP); Bo Finnkvist (S); Jan Hyttring (C); Erik Janson (S); Bertil Jonasson (C); Göthe Knutson (M); Gullan Lindblad (M); Magnus Persson (S); Hans Rosengren (S); Björn Samuelson (VPK); and Kristina Svensson (S).

Permanent substitutions:

- Karl Erik Eriksson (FP) resigned on 4 April 1988 and was replaced by Isa Halvarsson (FP) on 5 April 1988.

===== 1982 =====
Results of the 1982 general election held on 19 September 1982:

Party		Votes per municipality																Total votes	%	Seats		
Party		Årjäng	Arvika	Eda	Filip- stad	Fors- haga	Grums	Hag- fors	Ham- marö	Karl- stad	Kil	Kristine- hamn	Munk- fors	Säffle	Stor- fors	Sunne	Torsby	Total votes	%	Con.	Lev.	Tot.
Swedish Social Democratic Party	S	1,960	8,646	3,391	6,411	4,539	4,298	8,109	4,870	24,269	3,299	9,833	2,605	5,514	2,252	3,380	5,610	98,986	50.40%	6	0	6
Moderate Party	M	1,358	3,480	865	1,510	1,225	964	1,232	1,771	14,056	1,790	3,664	332	2,698	568	1,958	1,797	39,268	19.99%	3	0	3
Centre Party	C	2,013	3,639	1,443	985	1,188	1,103	1,735	719	6,911	1,361	2,461	438	3,301	509	3,266	2,263	33,335	16.97%	2	0	2
Liberal People's Party	FP	563	1,226	277	415	341	265	284	457	3,001	505	1,139	132	638	154	614	369	10,380	5.28%	0	1	1
Left Party – Communists	VPK	127	959	207	575	302	391	939	427	2,600	253	900	175	388	167	162	792	9,364	4.77%	0	1	1
Green Party	MP	61	349	58	140	104	60	171	115	919	127	208	43	124	33	84	161	2,757	1.40%	0	0	0
Christian Democratic Unity	KDS	168	159	66	73	119	96	107	23	499	43	255	30	216	34	101	98	2,087	1.06%	0	0	0
K-Party	K-P	0	5	2	2	3	11	0	3	17	1	3	1	0	2	0	2	52	0.03%	0	0	0
Other parties		5	17	15	7	12	3	3	8	69	11	24	2	3	2	1	4	186	0.09%	0	0	0
Valid votes		6,255	18,480	6,324	10,118	7,833	7,191	12,580	8,393	52,341	7,390	18,487	3,758	12,882	3,721	9,566	11,096	196,415	100.00%	11	2	13
Rejected votes		37	134	42	59	79	47	61	65	475	57	149	20	72	20	47	53	1,417	0.72%			
Total polled		6,292	18,614	6,366	10,177	7,912	7,238	12,641	8,458	52,816	7,447	18,636	3,778	12,954	3,741	9,613	11,149	197,832	90.39%			
Registered electors		7,412	20,755	7,030	11,138	8,460	7,887	13,530	8,953	57,284	7,987	20,307	4,041	14,294	4,020	13,509	12,258	218,865				
Turnout		84.89%	89.68%	90.55%	91.37%	93.52%	91.77%	93.43%	94.47%	92.20%	93.24%	91.77%	93.49%	90.63%	93.06%	71.16%	90.95%	90.39%				

The following candidates were elected: Sven Aspling (S); Karl Erik Eriksson (FP); Ove Eriksson (M); Bo Finnkvist (S); Bertil Jonasson (C); Göthe Knutson (M); Gullan Lindblad (M); Elvy Nilsson (S); Karl-Eric Norrby (C); Gunnar Olsson (S); Magnus Persson (S); Björn Samuelson (VPK); and Margot Wallström (S).

Permanent substitutions:

- Karl-Eric Norrby (C) died on 17 May 1983 and was replaced by Jan Hyttring (C) on 20 May 1983.

==== 1970s ====
===== 1979 =====
Results of the 1979 general election held on 16 September 1979:

Party		Votes per municipality																Total votes	%	Seats		
Party		Årjäng	Arvika	Eda	Filip- stad	Fors- haga	Grums	Hag- fors	Ham- marö	Karl- stad	Kil	Kristine- hamn	Munk- fors	Säffle	Stor- fors	Sunne	Torsby	Total votes	%	Con.	Lev.	Tot.
Swedish Social Democratic Party	S	1,768	8,253	3,186	6,300	4,424	4,146	8,017	4,447	22,361	2,846	9,171	2,610	5,093	2,126	3,205	5,353	93,306	47.68%	6	0	6
Centre Party	C	2,235	4,274	1,619	1,275	1,472	1,411	2,166	886	8,275	1,628	3,029	532	3,910	602	3,552	2,741	39,607	20.24%	2	0	2
Moderate Party	M	1,194	2,932	801	1,285	955	816	1,092	1,345	12,460	1,407	3,095	308	2,262	454	1,824	1,519	33,749	17.24%	2	0	2
Liberal People's Party	FP	792	1,825	451	732	612	442	457	648	5,129	825	2,035	204	1,084	264	800	548	16,848	8.61%	1	0	1
Left Party – Communists	VPK	132	987	218	614	309	375	977	411	2,459	236	918	187	480	140	171	893	9,507	4.86%	0	1	1
Christian Democratic Unity	KDS	125	119	63	57	81	52	89	14	296	24	206	18	163	26	76	68	1,477	0.75%	0	0	0
Communist Party of Sweden	SKP	8	82	4	15	7	8	47	39	161	23	13	8	7	5	3	17	447	0.23%	0	0	0
Workers' Party – The Communists	APK	0	4	2	22	10	25	4	9	31	0	0	0	0	2	3	4	116	0.06%	0	0	0
Other parties		4	106	20	32	41	6	12	41	263	39	31	4	13	2	7	26	647	0.33%	0	0	0
Valid votes		6,258	18,582	6,364	10,332	7,911	7,281	12,861	7,840	51,435	7,028	18,498	3,871	13,012	3,621	9,641	11,169	195,704	100.00%	11	1	12
Rejected votes		15	63	19	39	28	15	34	39	225	31	75	14	31	13	29	29	699	0.36%			
Total polled		6,273	18,645	6,383	10,371	7,939	7,296	12,895	7,879	51,660	7,059	18,573	3,885	13,043	3,634	9,670	11,198	196,403	91.22%			
Registered electors		7,473	20,843	7,010	11,341	8,537	7,974	13,854	8,394	56,422	7,613	20,448	4,126	14,499	3,893	10,562	12,325	215,314				
Turnout		83.94%	89.45%	91.06%	91.45%	93.00%	91.50%	93.08%	93.86%	91.56%	92.72%	90.83%	94.16%	89.96%	93.35%	91.55%	90.86%	91.22%				

The following candidates were elected: Sven Aspling (S); Raul Blücher (VPK); Karl Erik Eriksson (FP); Sune Johansson (S); Bertil Jonasson (C); Göthe Knutson (M); Gullan Lindblad (M); Elvy Nilsson (S); Karl-Eric Norrby (C); Gunnar Olsson (S); Magnus Persson (S); and Margot Wallström (S).

===== 1976 =====
Results of the 1976 general election held on 19 September 1976:

Party		Votes per municipality																Total votes	%	Seats		
Party		Årjäng	Arvika	Eda	Filip- stad	Fors- haga	Grums	Hag- fors	Ham- marö	Karl- stad	Kil	Kristine- hamn	Munk- fors	Säffle	Stor- fors	Sunne	Torsby	Total votes	%	Con.	Lev.	Tot.
Swedish Social Democratic Party	S	1,801	8,032	3,215	6,326	4,217	3,979	7,957	4,245	21,026	2,509	9,057	2,671	5,080	2,100	3,183	5,105	90,503	46.13%	5	1	6
Centre Party	C	2,657	5,458	2,004	1,860	1,799	1,779	2,690	1,251	11,353	1,941	4,302	630	4,794	695	4,179	3,238	50,630	25.81%	3	0	3
Moderate Party	M	972	2,290	645	999	653	571	917	830	9,440	944	2,493	227	1,759	360	1,489	1,329	25,918	13.21%	2	0	2
People's Party	F	826	2,170	447	858	617	527	598	684	6,082	1,055	2,074	279	1,280	236	844	709	19,286	9.83%	1	0	1
Left Party – Communists	VPK	74	848	161	563	217	303	881	324	1,934	135	800	144	336	119	127	877	7,843	4.00%	0	0	0
Christian Democratic Unity	KDS	166	105	45	67	60	56	98	22	238	36	226	24	144	48	50	81	1,466	0.75%	0	0	0
Communist Party of Sweden	SKP	7	59	9	22	10	16	32	43	177	27	22	3	20	5	21	37	510	0.26%	0	0	0
Other parties		0	1	0	0	1	0	5	1	11	0	3	0	1	3	1	0	27	0.01%	0	0	0
Valid votes		6,503	18,963	6,526	10,695	7,574	7,231	13,178	7,400	50,261	6,647	18,977	3,978	13,414	3,566	9,894	11,376	196,183	100.00%	11	1	12
Rejected votes		4	34	15	43	23	8	23	23	158	16	39	16	31	4	22	26	485	0.25%			
Total polled		6,507	18,997	6,541	10,738	7,597	7,239	13,201	7,423	50,419	6,663	19,016	3,994	13,445	3,570	9,916	11,402	196,668	92.20%			
Registered electors		7,550	21,004	7,105	11,624	8,044	7,853	14,058	7,895	54,448	7,101	20,565	4,233	14,749	3,753	10,750	12,568	213,300				
Turnout		86.19%	90.44%	92.06%	92.38%	94.44%	92.18%	93.90%	94.02%	92.60%	93.83%	92.47%	94.35%	91.16%	95.12%	92.24%	90.72%	92.20%				

The following candidates were elected: Sven Aspling (S); Karl Erik Eriksson (F); Allan Gustafsson (C); Sune Johansson (S); Bertil Jonasson (C); Göthe Knutson (M); Holger Mossberg (S); Elvy Nilsson (S); Per-Erik Nisser (M); Karl-Eric Norrby (C); Gunnar Olsson (S); and Magnus Persson (S).

===== 1973 =====
Results of the 1973 general election held on 16 September 1973:

Party		Votes per municipality																Total votes	%	Seats		
Party		Årjäng	Arvika	Eda	Filip- stad	Fors- haga	Grums	Hag- fors	Ham- marö	Karl- stad	Kil	Kristine- hamn	Munk- fors	Säffle	Stor- fors	Sunne	Torsby	Total votes	%	Con.	Lev.	Tot.
Swedish Social Democratic Party	S	1,798	8,158	3,334	6,392	4,055	3,921	7,976	4,254	21,592	2,233	9,031	2,663	5,082	2,134	3,266	5,165	91,054	48.29%	6	0	6
Centre Party	C	2,587	4,989	1,872	1,702	1,520	1,743	2,603	1,236	11,654	1,805	3,974	610	4,827	729	4,047	3,223	49,121	26.05%	3	0	3
Moderate Party	M	691	1,625	514	824	434	388	701	594	7,202	598	2,100	173	1,450	296	1,205	1,098	19,893	10.55%	1	0	1
People's Party	F	854	2,284	461	713	453	384	499	539	4,833	858	1,819	248	1,018	178	893	624	16,658	8.83%	1	0	1
Left Party – Communists	VPK	75	1,054	236	718	270	381	1,070	391	1,993	170	965	183	468	117	165	1,005	9,261	4.91%	0	1	1
Christian Democratic Unity	KDS	188	125	69	60	80	80	101	24	376	34	231	40	205	35	59	91	1,798	0.95%	0	0	0
Communist Party of Sweden	SKP	17	64	9	20	9	27	55	26	256	17	28	16	9	11	11	60	635	0.34%	0	0	0
Communist League Marxist–Leninists (the revolutionaries)	KFML(r)	1	13	1	7	2	0	5	13	62	4	8	0	4	5	3	8	136	0.07%	0	0	0
Other parties		0	2	0	0	0	1	1	0	1	0	2	0	0	1	1	0	9	0.00%	0	0	0
Valid votes		6,211	18,314	6,496	10,436	6,823	6,925	13,011	7,077	47,969	5,719	18,158	3,933	13,063	3,506	9,650	11,274	188,565	100.00%	11	1	12
Rejected votes		2	17	2	11	6	7	5	3	43	5	19	4	8	2	7	14	155	0.08%			
Total polled		6,213	18,331	6,498	10,447	6,829	6,932	13,016	7,080	48,012	5,724	18,177	3,937	13,071	3,508	9,657	11,288	188,720	91.67%			
Registered electors		7,333	20,371	7,112	11,439	7,279	7,526	13,899	7,547	52,150	6,168	19,830	4,160	14,428	3,708	10,471	12,451	205,872				
Turnout		84.73%	89.99%	91.37%	91.33%	93.82%	92.11%	93.65%	93.81%	92.07%	92.80%	91.66%	94.64%	90.59%	94.61%	92.23%	90.66%	91.67%				

The following candidates were elected: Karl-Gustav Andersson (S); Sven Aspling (S); Karl Erik Eriksson (F); Allan Gustafsson (C); Bertil Jonasson (C); John Magnusson (VPK); Holger Mossberg (S); Elvy Nilsson (S); Per-Erik Nisser (M); Karl-Eric Norrby (C); Magnus Persson (S); and Viola Sandell (S).

Permanent substitutions:

- Viola Sandell (S) resigned on 31 December 1975 and was replaced by Gunnar Olsson (S) on 1 January 1976.

===== 1970 =====
Results of the 1970 general election held on 20 September 1970:

Party		Votes	%	Seats		
Party		Votes	%	Con.	Lev.	Tot.
Swedish Social Democratic Party	S	93,739	51.01%	6	1	7
Centre Party	C	38,436	20.92%	3	0	3
People's Party	F	22,847	12.43%	1	1	2
Moderate Party	M	17,243	9.38%	1	0	1
Left Party – Communists	VPK	8,920	4.85%	0	1	1
Christian Democratic Unity	KDS	2,099	1.14%	0	0	0
Communist League Marxists-Leninists	KFML	469	0.26%	0	0	0
Other parties		4	0.00%	0	0	0
Valid votes		183,757	100.00%	11	3	14
Rejected votes		202	0.11%			
Total polled		183,959	88.90%			
Registered electors		206,937				

The following candidates were elected: Karl-Gustav Andersson (S); Sven Aspling (S); Karl Erik Eriksson (F); Arvid Eskel (S); Allan Gustafsson (C); Bertil Jonasson (C); John Magnusson (VPK); Holger Mossberg (S); Per-Erik Nisser (M); Elvy Nilsson (S); Karl-Eric Norrby (C); Billy Olsson (F); Magnus Persson (S); and Viola Sandell (S).

Permanent substitutions:

- Arvid Eskel (S) resigned on 9 October 1972 and was replaced by Gunnar Olsson (S) on 10 October 1972.
