= Eva-Lena Gustavsson =

Swedish politician (born 1956)

Member of the Riksdag
- In office 27 March 2018 – 24 September 2018
- Preceded by: Berit Högman
- Constituency: Värmland County

Personal details
- Born: 1956 (age 69–70)
- Party: Social Democratic Party

Eva-Lena Gustavsson (born 1956) is a Swedish politician and former member of the Riksdag, the national legislature. A member of the Social Democratic Party, she represented Värmland County between March 2018 and September 2018. She had previously been a substitute member of the Riksdag for Jonas Gunnarsson between August 2017 and January 2018.
