= Patriksson =

Patriksson is a surname. Notable people with the surname include:

- Johan Patriksson (born 1982), Swedish footballer
- Runar Patriksson (born 1944), Swedish politician
