= Blåvitt Elofsson =

Swedish politician (born 1953)

Member of the Riksdag
- In office 1 March 2025 – 28 September 2026
- Preceded by: Gunilla Svantorp
- Constituency: Värmland County

Personal details
- Born: Lars-Gösta Thaagaard Elofsson; 31 October 1953 (age 72) Mölndal, Sweden
- Party: Social Democratic Party

Lars-Gösta Blåvitt Thaagaard Elofsson (born Lars-Gösta Thaagaard Elofsson; 31 October 1953) is a Swedish politician and former Member of the Riksdag. A member of the Social Democratic Party, he represented Värmland County from March 2025 to September 2026.

Elofsson was born on 31 October 1953 in Mölndal, a suburb of Gothenburg. He moved to Karlstad in 1976. As a supporter IFK Göteborg, he was known as "han som håller på Blåvitt" (the one who supports Blue-White) which eventually changed to just "Blåvitt". He officially added Blåvitt as a middle name in 2008 and in 2017 it became his primary given name.

Elofsson was a factory worker who worked machine workshops. He was a trade union representative for IF Metall and has held roles in the Arbetarnas bildningsförbund in Värmland. He is Head of Administration at Karlstad Football Club and is also involved with Värmlands Fotbollförbund. He is a member of the Swedish National Pensioners' Organisation (PRO) and is chairman of its Karlstad Västra branch.

Elofsson has been politically active since 2008. He is a member of the municipal council in Karlstad. He was appointed to the Riksdag in March 2025 following the resignation of Gunilla Svantorp.

Elofsson lives with his partner in Karlstad and has three children, five grandchildren, and nine great-grandchildren.

Electoral history of Blåvitt Elofsson
Election	Constituency	Party	List no.	Votes	%	Result
2014 local	Karlstad Municipality	Social Democratic Party	14			Elected - party mandate
2018 local	Karlstad Municipality	Social Democratic Party	8			Elected - party mandate
2022 general	Värmland County	Social Democratic Party	5	395	0.63%	Not elected
2022 local	Karlstad Municipality	Social Democratic Party	20	112	0.49%	Elected - party mandate
2026 general	Värmland County	Social Democratic Party	7	554	0.97%	Not elected
2026 local	Karlstad Municipality	Social Democratic Party	20	127	0.55%	Elected - party mandate
