= Jarl Lander =

Swedish politician (1944–2014)

Member of the Riksdag
- In office 3 October 1988 – 2 October 2006
- Constituency: Värmland County

Personal details
- Born: 1944
- Died: 26 May 2014 (aged 70)
- Party: Social Democratic Party

Jarl Bertil Lander (1944 – 26 May 2014) was a Swedish politician and member of the Riksdag, the national legislature. A member of the Social Democratic Party, he represented Värmland County between October 1988 and October 2006. He was also a substitute member of the Riksdag for Roine Carlsson between September 1985 and October 1988. He died on 26 May 2014 aged 70.
