= Lars Mejern Larsson =

Swedish politician (born 1965)

Lars Mejern Larsson S
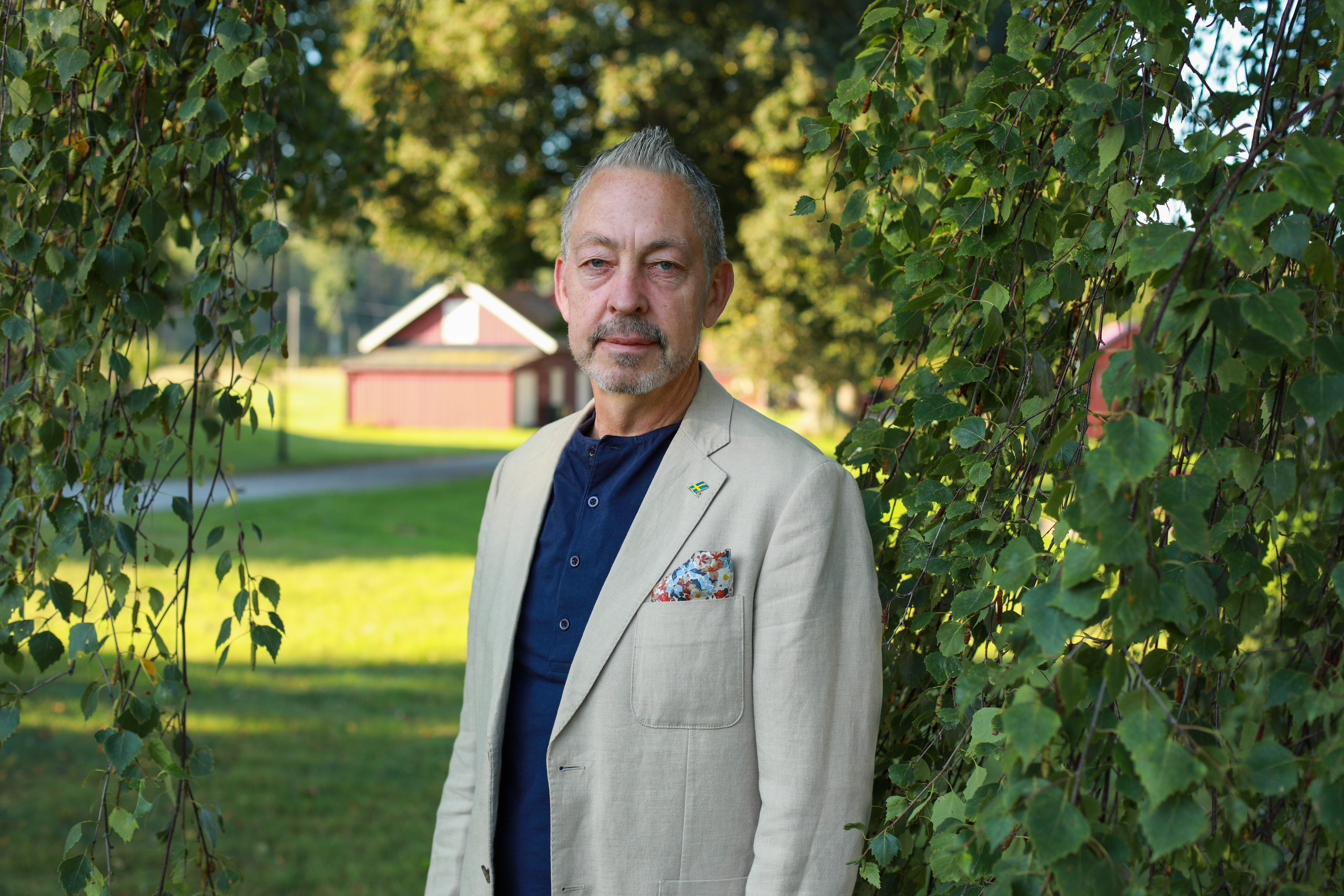

Member of the Swedish Parliament for Värmland County constituency
- Incumbent
- Assumed office 2005

Personal details
- Born: 31 December 1965 (age 60)
- Party: Social Democratic Party
- Parents: Lars-Göran Larsson; Henny Högberg
- Profession: Politician, ombudsman
- Website: socialdemokraternavarmland.se/ riksdagsledamoter/lars-mejern-larsson/

Lars Mejern Larsson (born 31 December 1965) is a Swedish Social Democratic politician who has been a member of the Riksdag since 2006. He is a member for the constituency of Värmland County and is currently taking up seat number 21.

Larsson was a member of Transport and Communications Committee from 2010 until 2018. From October 2018 until October 2020 he was a member of the Swedish delegation to the Nordic Council, before this he was an alternate for the delegation. Since the 2018 general election he is a member of the Cultural Affairs Committee.

== Biography ==
Lars Mejern Larsson was born on 31 December 1965, to Lars-Göran Larsson a metal worker, and Henny Högberg, a library manager. He grew up in Karlstad and went to high-school there. He graduated from high-school in 1983 at the age of 18 as a construction worker. In 1985 he was employed as a postman in Tomteboda and Karlstad, he stopped working as a mail carrier in 1987. He started working as a joiner the same year for the Karlstad-based company Siab until 1995. He was later employed as an ombudsman for the construction company Bygg 29:an based in Värmland County from 1995 until 2006.

=== Work in Karlstad municipality ===
He was elected as a member of the municipal council of Karlstad municipality from 1998 until 2006. He was a member of the committee on democratic policies and the working block. from 1999 to 2001. He later became a member of the leisure committee for Karlstad from 1999 till 2002. From 2002 until 2006 he was a member of the municipal board of Karlstad. In 2003 he was the chairperson for the technology committee of Karlstad and a member of the Karlstad-Grums water association and Stiftelsen Karlstads studentbostäder. He was an alternate for Karlstad City Hall (Karlstad Stadshus AB) and Helax bränsleutveckling AB from 2005 until 2006.

=== Work in the Riksdag ===
Larsson first joined the Riksdag in 2005 since a member of the Social Democratic Party had left the Riksdag and he was next in line to fill up the seat. He first elected to the Riksdag after the 2006 general election on the ballot for the Social Democrats for the constituency of Värmland County. When he first entered the Riksdag he was not a permanent member of one of the 17 committees but an alternate for the Cultural Affairs Committee, the Transport and Communications Committee, the Industry and Trade Committee, and the Health and Welfare Committee. After the 2010 general election he joined the Transport and Communications Committee, he would stay a member of this committee until 2018. After the 2018 general election he became a member of the Cultural Affairs Committee along with joining the Swedish delegation to the Nordic Council, a position he was previously an alternate for (July 2015 until October 2018). In October 2020 he left his position as a member of the Swedish delegation to the Noric Council.
