= Gullan Lindblad =

Swedish politician (1932–2023)

Member of the Riksdag for Värmland County
- In office 1 October 1979 – 5 October 1998

Personal details
- Born: Gullan Birgit Kristina Persson; 13 November 1932 Gunnarskog, Sweden
- Died: 6 September 2023 (aged 90) Karlstad, Sweden
- Party: M
- Occupation: Nurse

Gullan Birgit Kristina Lindblad (née Persson; 13 November 1932 – 6 September 2023) was a Swedish nurse and politician. A member of the Moderate Party, she served in the Riksdag from 1979 to 1998. She was the Chair of the Moderate Women in 1990–1997.

Lindblad died in Karlstad on 6 September 2023, at the age of 90.
