= Bengt Berg (poet) =

Swedish poet and politician (born 1946)

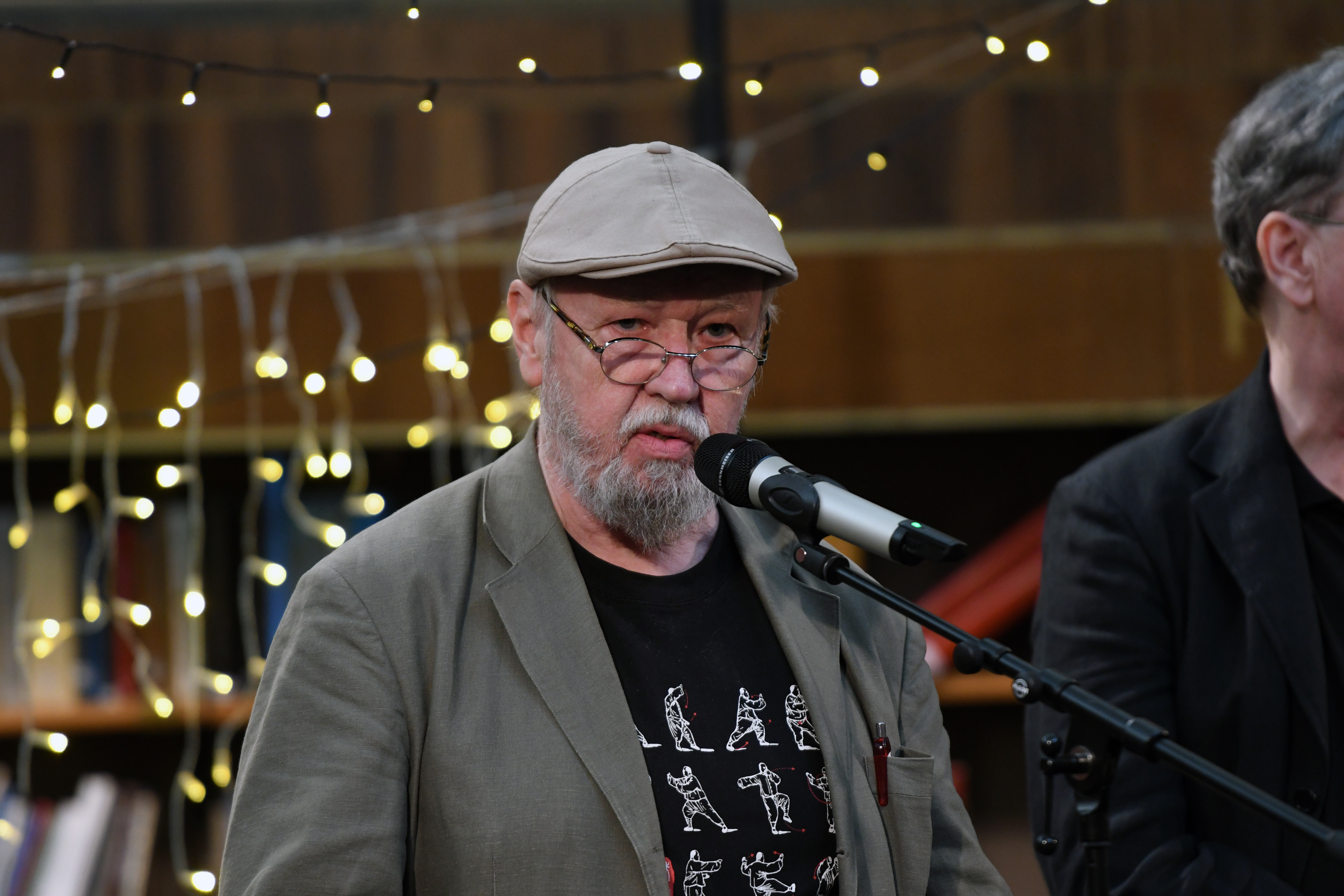
- Berg in March 2019

Member of the Riksdag
- In office 4 October 2010 – 29 September 2014
- Constituency: Värmland County

Personal details
- Born: 1946 (age 79–80)
- Party: Left Party

Bengt Sören Berg (born 1946) is a Swedish poet, politician and former member of the Riksdag, the national legislature. A member of the Left Party, he represented Värmland County between October 2010 and September 2014.
