= Mikael Dahlqvist =

Swedish politician (born 1967)

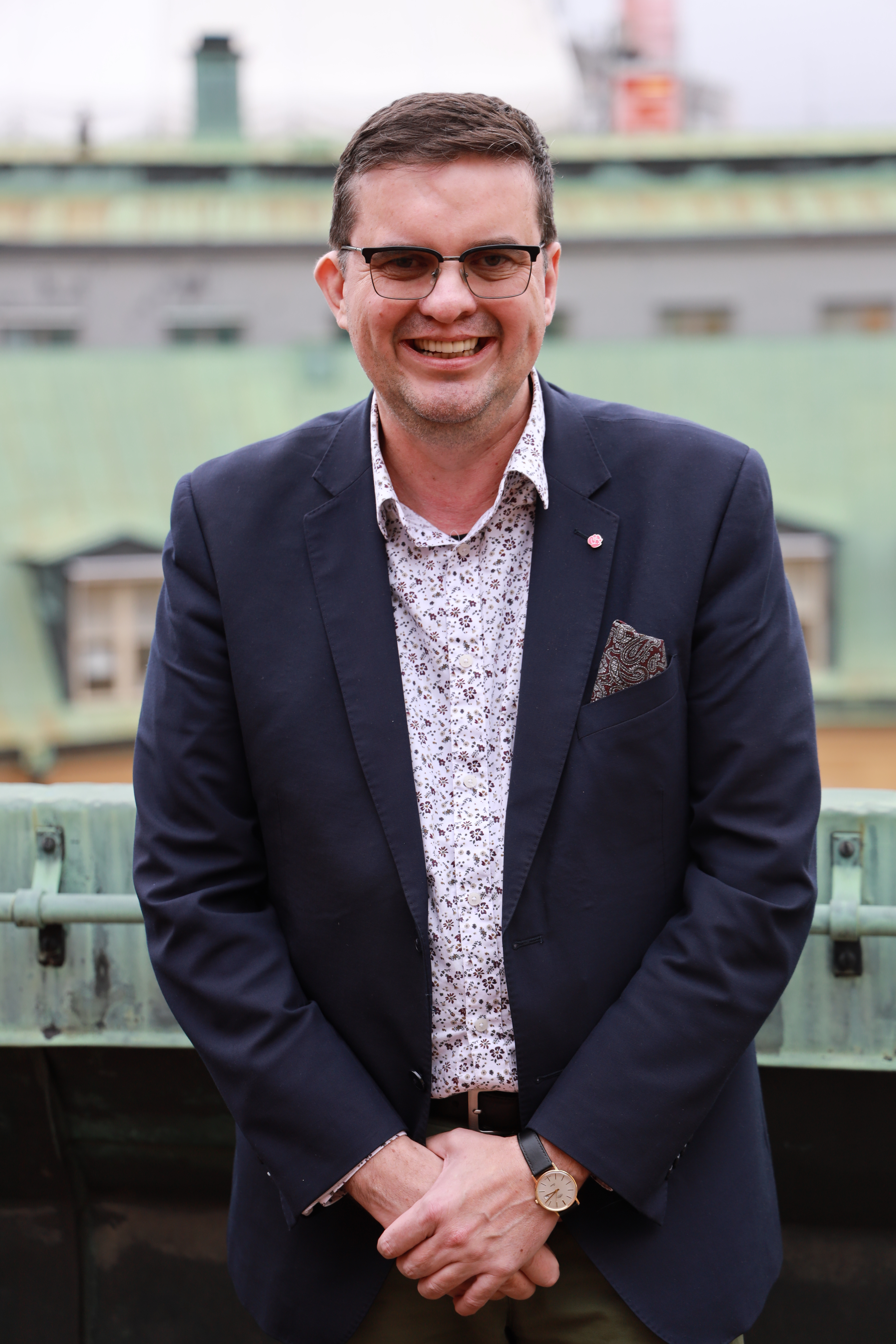

Member of the Riksdag
- Incumbent
- Assumed office 29 September 2014
- Constituency: Värmland County

Personal details
- Born: 1967 (age 58–59)
- Party: Social Democrats

Mikael Dahlqvist (born 1967) is a Swedish politician. Since September 2014, he has served as a Member of the Riksdag representing the constituency of Värmland County.

He was also elected as a Member of the Riksdag in September 2018 and September 2022.
