= Håkan Svenneling =

Swedish politician (born 1985)

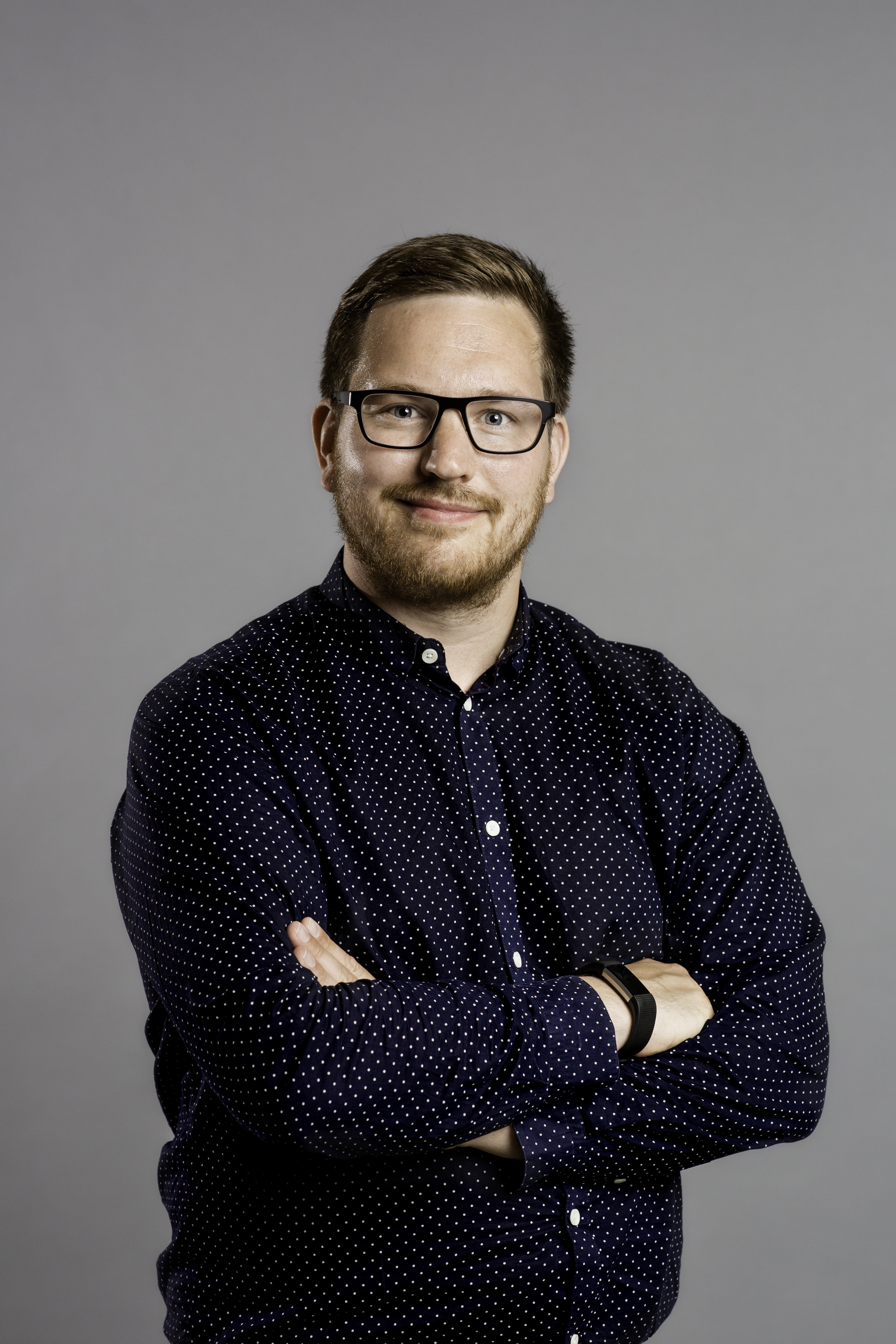

Member of the Riksdag
- Incumbent
- Assumed office 29 September 2014
- Constituency: Värmland County

Personal details
- Born: 17 September 1985 (age 41)
- Party: Left Party

Håkan Svenneling (born 17 September 1985) is a Swedish politician. Since September 2014, he serves as Member of the Riksdag representing the constituency of Värmland County. He is affiliated with the Left Party.

He was re-elected as Member of the Riksdag in September 2018 and September 2022.
