= Marléne Lund Kopparklint =

Swedish politician (born 1973)

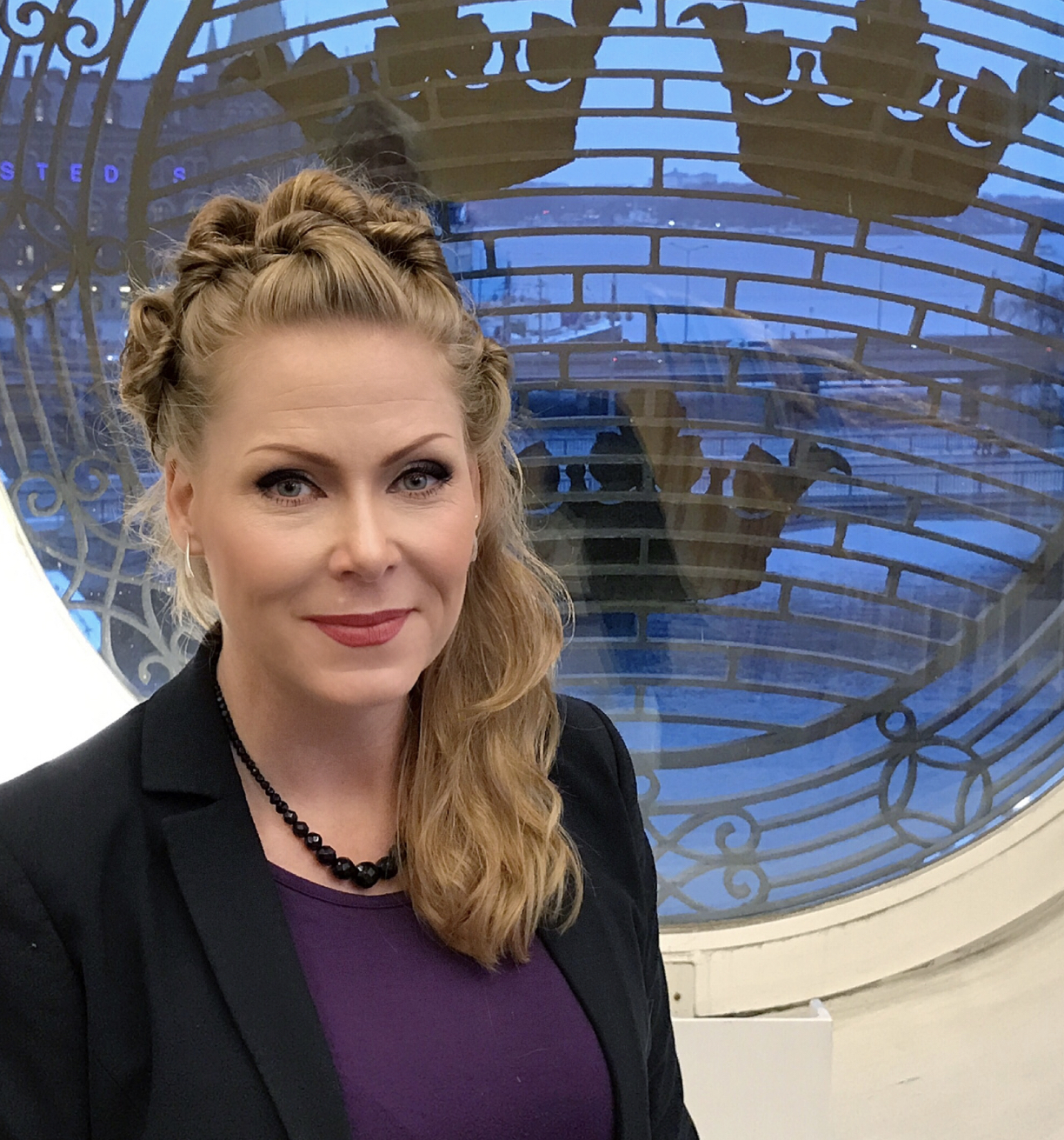
- Marléne Lund Kopparklint in 2019

Member of the Riksdag
- In office 2018–2026
- Constituency: Värmland County

Personal details
- Born: 24 July 1973 (age 53)
- Party: Sweden Democrats (since 2026)
- Other political affiliations: Moderate Party (until 2026)

Marléne Althea Lund Kopparklint (previously Engström; born 24 July 1973) is a Swedish author and politician. She was elected as a member of the Moderate Party during the 2018 and has been member of the Riksdag for Värmland County. She announced her departure from the Moderates in 2026 to join the Sweden Democrats.

Before entering politics, Lund Kopparklint was a social worker and a field assistant for the department of social services and later worked for the Ministry of Health and Social Affairs. She was responsible for drafting the Karlstad Ansvar initiative whose mission was to work preventively against drug abuse among young people. She has also worked as an author and wrote a novel Det som inte syns in 2014 inspired by her own experiences growing up in a destructive family which later became a trilogy of books.

She was elected as a municipal councilor in Karlstad in 2010 and then to the Riksdag during the 2018 general election. When the Moderate Party list was being determined for the 2026 Swedish general election she was nominated in second place on the Värmland County list after defense minister Pål Jonson. However, after internal disputes within the party she was demoted to third place and chose to remove herself from the list entirely. In 2026, she announced her decision to join the Sweden Democrats. In a statement, Lund Kopparklint emphasized her commitment to vulnerable children and that the Sweden Democrats had given the subject a high priority.

She is a member of Armenian-Swedish parliamentary friendship group.

== Bibliography ==
- Det som inte syns: en uppväxtskildring. Kristinehamn: Norlén & Slottner. 2012. Libris 13534549. ISBN 9789186859589
- Maskrosflickan. Kristinehamn: Norlén & Slottner. 2014. Libris 16763188. ISBN 9789187685255

== See also ==
- List of members of the Riksdag, 2018–2022
- List of members of the Riksdag, 2022–2026
