= Peter Söderström =

Swedish politician (born 1975)

Member of the Riksdag
- Incumbent
- Assumed office 28 September 2026
- Constituency: Värmland County

Personal details
- Born: 1975 (age 50–51) Arvika Municipality, Sweden
- Party: Social Democratic Party

Gert Peter Söderström (born 1975) is a Swedish politician and Member of the Riksdag. A member of the Social Democratic Party, he has represented Värmland County since September 2026.

Söderström was born in 1975 in Arvika Municipality. He works in the construction industry as a carpenter. He is a trade union activist and is a member of the Swedish Building Workers' Union (Byggnads) and the Swedish Trade Union Confederation (LO).

Söderström has been an active member of the Social Democratic Party since 2006. He was a member of the municipal council in Arvika and became chairman of the municipal commission (kommunalråd) in 2015. He was elected to the Riksdag at the 2026 general election.

Söderström is married and has four children. He lives in Edane.
