= Kjell-Arne Ottosson =

Swedish politician (born 1975)

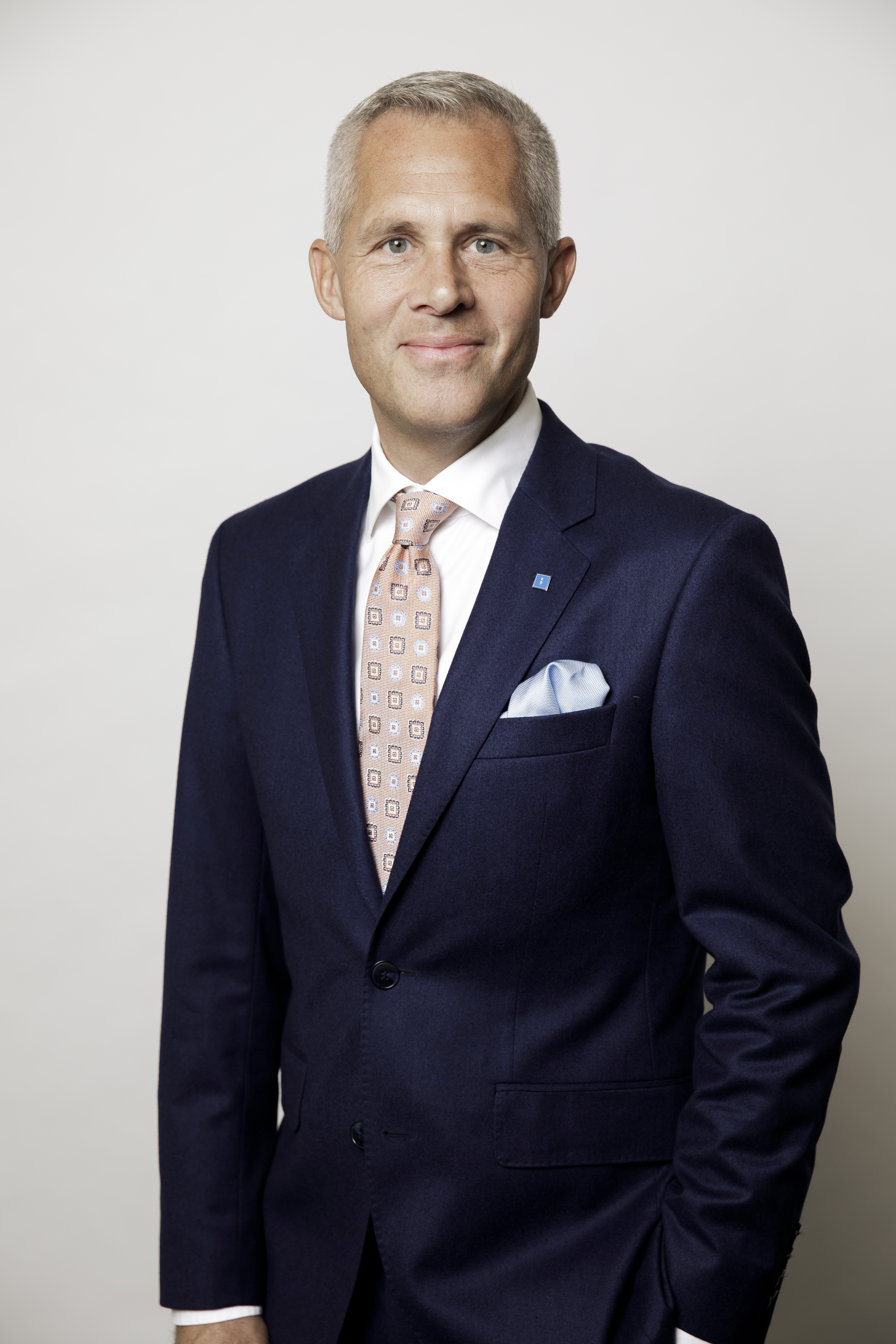

Member of the Riksdag
- Incumbent
- Assumed office 2018
- Constituency: Värmland County

Personal details
- Born: 1975 (age 50–51)
- Party: Christian Democrats

Kjell-Arne Ottosson (born 1975) is a Swedish politician from the Christian Democrats. He has been a member of the Riksdag since 2018. He was re-elected in 2022. He is a member of the Committee on Environment and Agriculture. He was re-elected in the 2026 Swedish general election.

== See also ==
- List of members of the Riksdag, 2018–2022
- List of members of the Riksdag, 2022–2026
- List of members of the Riksdag, 2026–2030
