= Lotta Björklund =

Swedish politician (born 1969)

Member of the Riksdag
- Incumbent
- Assumed office 28 September 2026
- Constituency: Värmland County

Personal details
- Born: 1969 (age 56–57)
- Party: Moderate Party

Lotta Björklund (born 1969) is a Swedish politician from the Moderate Party. She has been a member of the Riksdag since 2026, elected for the Värmland County constituency.

== Background ==
Björklund has worked in the upper secondary school introductory program and as a school principal at a high school. She has also trained as a CBT therapist and addiction therapist.

== Political career ==
Björklund has been a member of the municipal council in Karlstad Municipality during the term of office 2022–2026. She became first vice-chair of the municipality's labour market and social affairs committee in January 2023 and a member of the municipal executive board the same month.

=== Riksdag ===
Björklund took office as Deputy Minister in the Riksdag on 28 September 2026, for Pål Jonson. Since 6 October 2026, she has been serving as a deputy member of the Committee on Cultural Affairs and the Committee on Health and Welfare.

== See also ==
- List of members of the Riksdag, 2026–2030
