= Stina Bergström =

Swedish politician (born 1958)

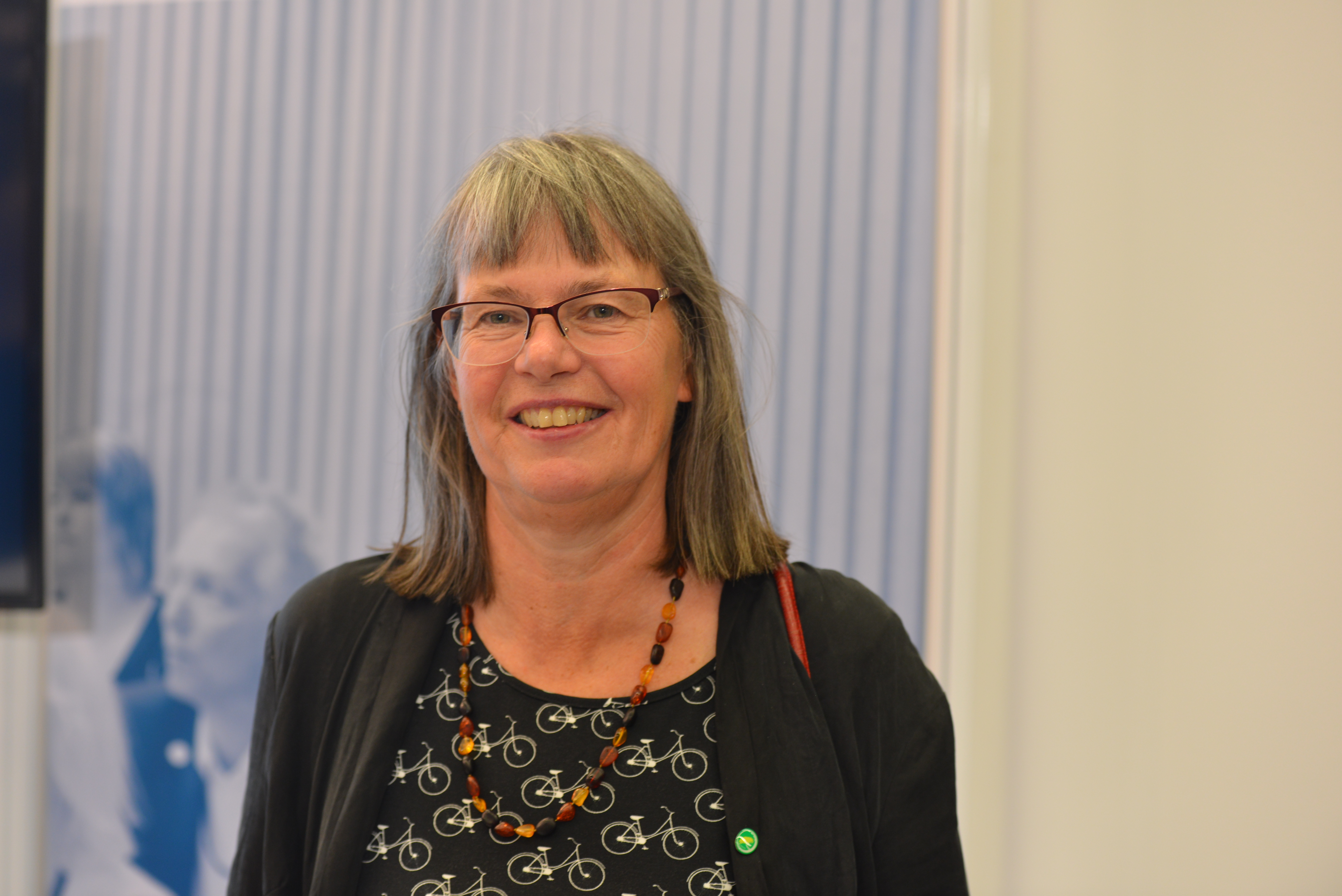
- Bergström in September 2017

Member of the Riksdag
- In office 4 October 2010 – 24 September 2018
- Constituency: Värmland County

Personal details
- Born: Kristina Helena Bergström; 1958 (age 67–68)
- Party: Green Party

Kristina Helena Bergström (born 1958) is a Swedish politician and former member of the Riksdag, the national legislature. A member of the Green Party, she represented Värmland County between October 2010 and September 2018.

Bergström is the daughter of lawyer Svante Bergström and teacher Margareta Bergström (née Kähr). She was educated in Uppsala. She studied philosophy and law at the Uppsala University, cultural studies and journalism at the University of Gothenburg and literature at Karlstad University. She was an archivist/copyist and journalist at the Värmlands Folkblad from 1984 to 1986 and a journalist at the Bohusläningen in 1986. She was cultural assistant for Forshaga Municipality from 1987 to 1992 and a theatre producer from 1992 to 1996. She was a student recruiter for Karlstad University from 1996 to 2002 and a student advisor at the university from 2002 2010. She was a member of the municipal council in Kil Municipality between 2007 and 2010.
