= Robin Lennartsson =

Swedish politician (born 1994)

Member of the Riksdag
- Incumbent
- Assumed office 28 September 2026
- Constituency: Värmland County

Personal details
- Born: 24 June 1994 (age 32)
- Party: Sweden Democrats

Robin Stig Göran Lennartsson (born 24 June 1994) is a Swedish politician who was elected member of the Riksdag in 2026. He is the chairman of the Sweden Democrats in Karlstad Municipality.
