= Runar Filper =

Swedish politician (born 1964)

Member of the Riksdag
- Incumbent
- Assumed office 2014
- Constituency: Värmland County

Personal details
- Born: 19 May 1964 (age 62) Bromma
- Party: Sweden Democrats
- Education: Università per Stranieri di Perugia; Karlstad University

Runar Salvatore Toto Schillaci Filper (born 26 May 1964) is a Swedish politician and a member of the Riksdag for the Sweden Democrats party. He represents the Värmland County constituency.

== Biography ==
Filper was born in 1964. He graduated with a technical qualification in carpentry, building and civil engineering and worked in various jobs including as a welder, a park warden and as a sailor in Denmark. He then obtained a degree in the Italian language and history at the Università per Stranieri di Perugia, Italy and became a museum curator before finally completing a bachelor's degree in political science and geography at Karlstad University in 2009 after which he became an organizer for the Sweden Democrats.

Filper has been a member of the municipal council for Sunne Municipality and the SD's district chairman for Värmland County since 2002. He was elected as a member of the Riksdag since 2014 and was re-elected at the 2022 Swedish general election. He is a member of the Culture Committee and a deputy member of the Committee on the Environment and Agriculture. Following his election in 2014, there was some controversy when it was revealed that he had previously been convicted of theft and assault in the 1980s.
