= Marie Engström =

Swedish politician (born 1953)

Marie Engström (born 1953) is a Swedish Left Party politician. She has been a member of the Riksdag since 1996.

== Biography ==
Before Marie Engström became a member of the Riksdag, she worked as a corporate auditor.

She entered the Riksdag as a deputy in June 1996; from September 1996 until 2010, she was a regular member of parliament. In the Riksdag, her constituency was Värmland County. During her time in the Riksdag, Marie Engström was a member of the Tax Committee 1998–2010 and in various periods deputy member of the EU Committee, the Finance Committee, the Business Committee, the Tax Committee, the Social Insurance Committee and the Social Affairs Committee. She was also a deputy on the National Audit Office's Board 2006–2010.

In 2007, Engström topped the interest group Företagarna's ranking of most company-friendly members of parliament.
