= Gunilla Svantorp =

Swedish politician (born 1964)

Gunilla Svantorp S
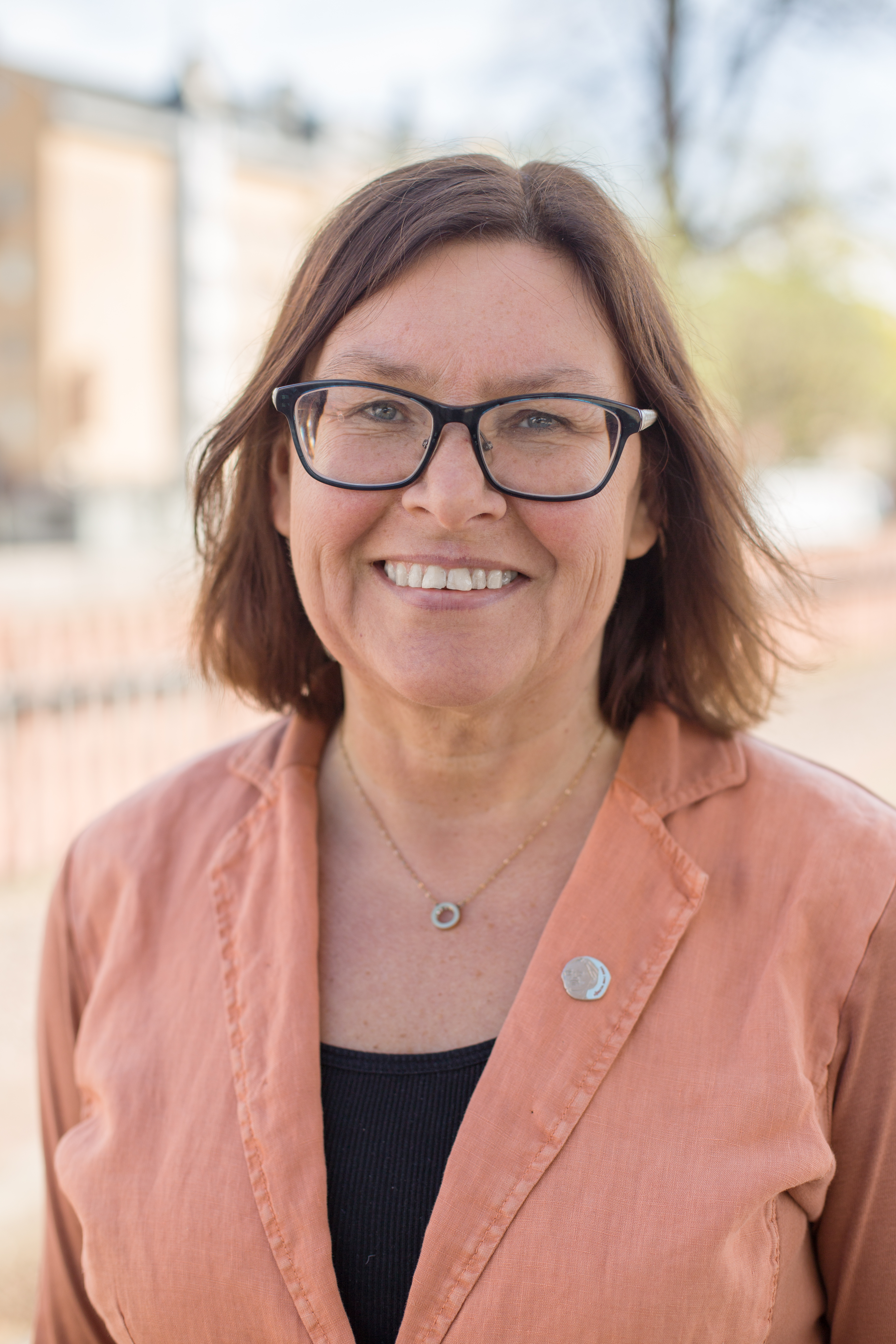
- Gunilla Svantorp (2018)

Governor of Östergötland County
- Incumbent
- Assumed office 1 March 2025
- Monarch: Carl XVI Gustaf
- Prime Minister: Ulf Kristersson
- Preceded by: Carl Fredrik Graf

Member of the Riksdag
- In office 4 October 2010 – 28 February 2025
- Constituency: Värmland County constituency

Personal details
- Born: Erna Gunilla Svantorp; 19 January 1964 (age 62) Fässberg Parish, Mölndal Municipality, Västra Götaland County, Sweden
- Party: Social Democratic Party
- Parents: Jan-Eric Karlsson; Ritva Karlsson
- Occupation: Politician and university professor
- Awards: Legion of Honour

Erna Gunilla Svantorp (née Karlsson; born 19 January 1964), is a Swedish Social Democratic politician and civil servant who serves as Governor of Östergötland County since March 2025.

She previously served as member of the Riksdag, and was a schoolteacher. She was elected in 2010 for the constituency of Värmland County and took up seat number 162, after the 2018 general election she was assigned seat number 22.

As a recently elected MP of the Riksdag, she was assigned to the Education Committee as her main committee, she was also assigned to be an alternate for the Cultural Affairs Committee and the Health and Welfare Committee. She later gave up her position as an alternate for the Cultural Affairs Committee on 9 November 2010 her party colleague and the bench neighbor from Värmland, Berit Högman, became Speaker for the committee. She kept her seat as a member of the education committee, and after she retook her position as an alternate for the Cultural Affairs Committee up until 2018. After the 2018 general election she kept her position as an alternate for the Cultural Affairs Committee and for the Health and Welfare Committee, she also became an alternate for the Industry and Trade Committee. In 2019 she was chosen to be the Speaker for the Education Committee after the former Speaker was chosen by Prime Minister Stefan Löfven to be a part of the Löfven II Cabinet as the Minister for Higher Education and Research.

From 2003 up until 2010, she was a member of the County Council of Värmland Regional Council. In 2006 she was Speaker for the Staff Committee and vice-Speaker for the County Council Board.

She has been president of ABF Värmland. She has also been a board member and the president of Konstfrämjandet in Värmland.

Svantorp has a master's in philosophy, in pedagogy along with a high school teaching degree.

On 11 June 2019 received the French Legion of Honour of the Knight (Chevalier) class. The award was awarded to her by ambassador David Cvach at the Embassy of France, Stockholm.

== Personal life ==
Svantorp is the daughter of Jan Erik Karlsson and Ritva Karlsson. She resides in Årjäng. She was married to Eje Svantorp (1949–2014) from 1989 up until his death in 2014. She had four children with him.

== Distinctions ==
- Legion of Honour, Knight (France).
