= Bertil Jonasson =

Swedish politician (1918–2011)

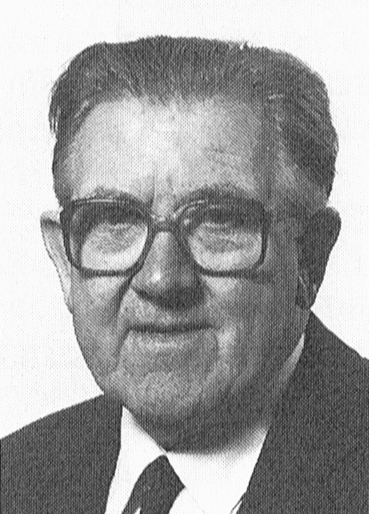
Image of Bertil Jonasson

Bertil Jonasson (12 January 1918 – 15 June 2011) was a Swedish politician and a member of the Centre Party. Jonassson was a member of the Parliament of Sweden between 1958 and 1988.He died in June 2011.
