= Dan Kihlström =

Swedish politician (born 1957)

Dan Kihlström (born 1957) is a Swedish Christian Democratic politician, member of the Riksdag since 1998.
