= Ann-Kristine Johansson =

Swedish politician (born 1962)

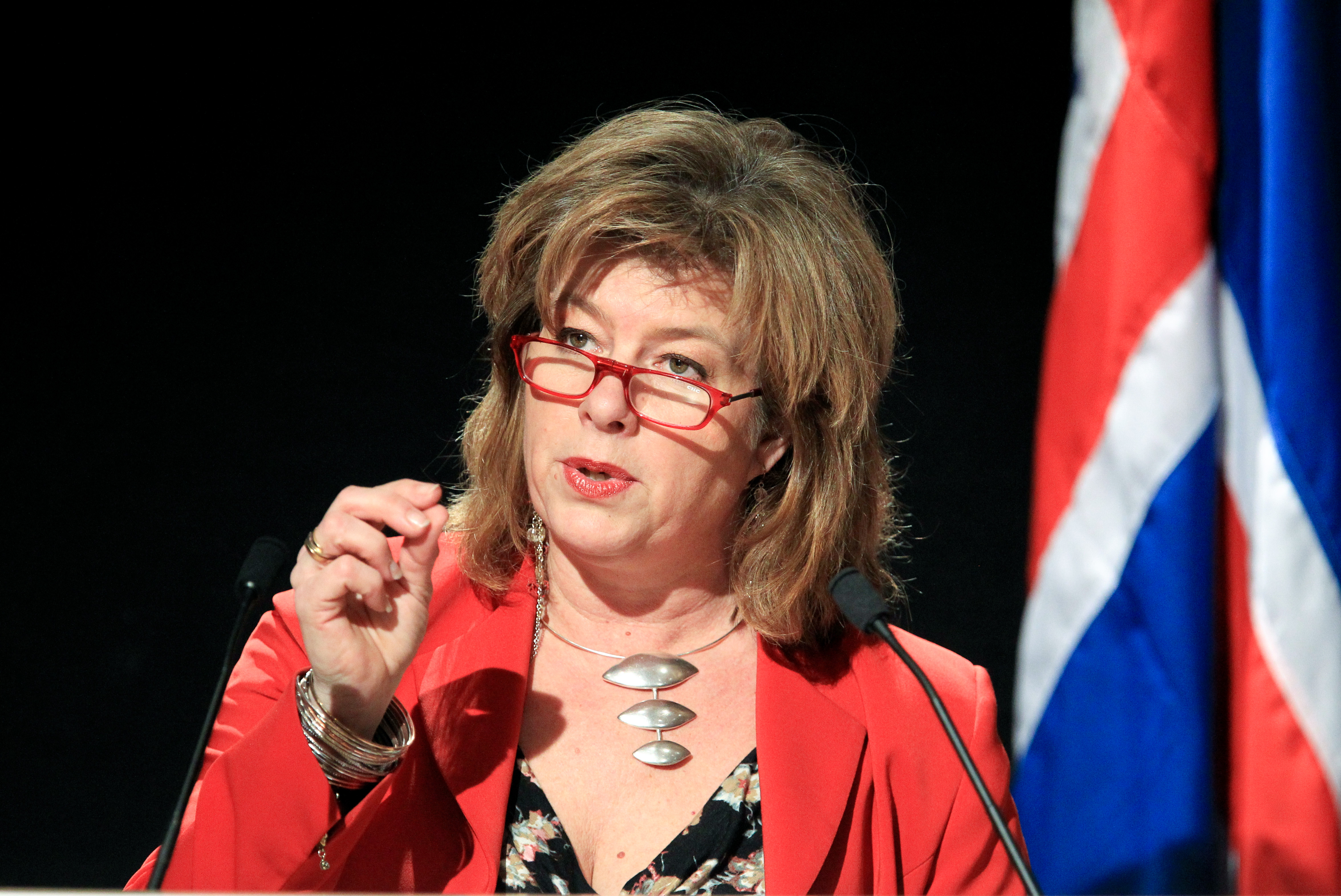

Ann-Kristine Johansson, born 1962, is a Swedish social democratic politician who has been a member of the Riksdag since 1994.
