= Pia Hallström =

Swedish politician (1961–2016)

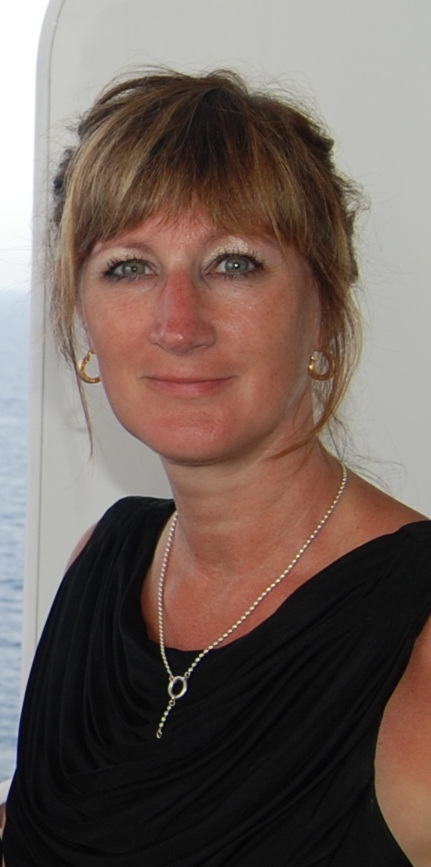
- In office 2010–2016

Pia Hallström (23 September 1961 – 11 October 2016) was a Swedish politician. A member of the Moderate Party, she was first elected to the Riksdag in 2010 and reelected in 2014. She died of breast cancer in 2016 at the age of 55.

== Biography ==
Hallström was born and raised in Karlstad. She taught chemistry and biology at high school before entering parliament. She was most active campaigning on issues such as human trafficking, domestic violence, childhood bullying and protecting children from distress.

Hallström served on the Swedish parliament's committee on justice (from 2010 to 2016) and the committee on labour (from 2010 to 2012). She was also one of Sweden's representatives on the Nordic Council from 2014 to 2016.
