= Jan-Evert Rådhström =

Swedish politician (born 1960)

Jan-Evert Rådhström (born 1960) is a Swedish politician of the Moderate Party, member of the Riksdag since 1998.
