= Jonas Gunnarsson (politician) =

Swedish politician (born 1980)

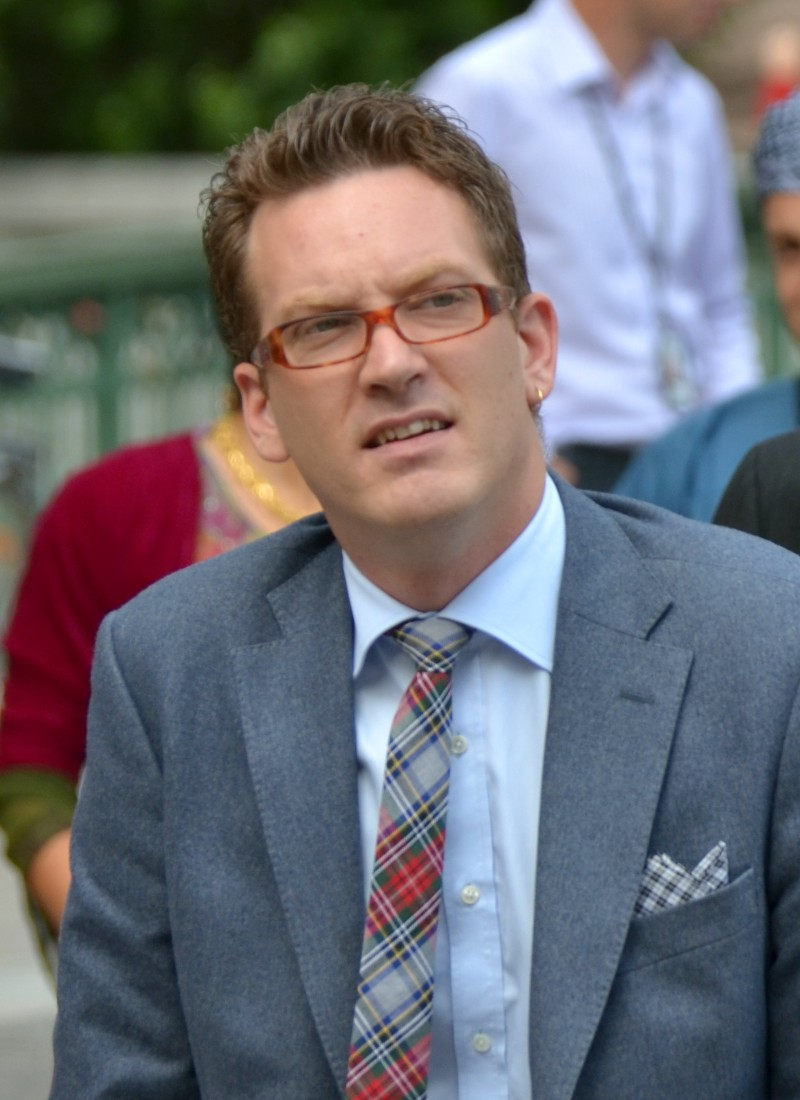
- Gunnarsson in September 2012

Member of the Riksdag
- In office 4 October 2010 – 24 September 2018
- Constituency: Värmland County

Personal details
- Born: Jonas Gunnarsson; 1980 (age 45–46)
- Party: Social Democratic Party

Jonas Gunnarsson (born 1980) is a Swedish politician and former member of the Riksdag, the national legislature. A member of the Social Democratic Party, he represented Värmland County between October 2010 and September 2018.

Gunnarsson is the son of carpenter/musician Mats Gunnarsson and district nurse Inga-Lill Gunnarsson (née Jönsson). He was educated at a folk high school in Axvall. He has worked as a personal assistant/care worker in Hammarö since 2002. He was a member of the municipal council in Hammarö Municipality from 2003 to 2010.
