= Marina Pettersson =

Swedish politician (born 1955)

Marina Pettersson (born 1955), is a Swedish social democratic politician who has been a member of the Riksdag since 1997.
