= Christian Holm (Swedish politician) =

Swedish politician (born 1976)

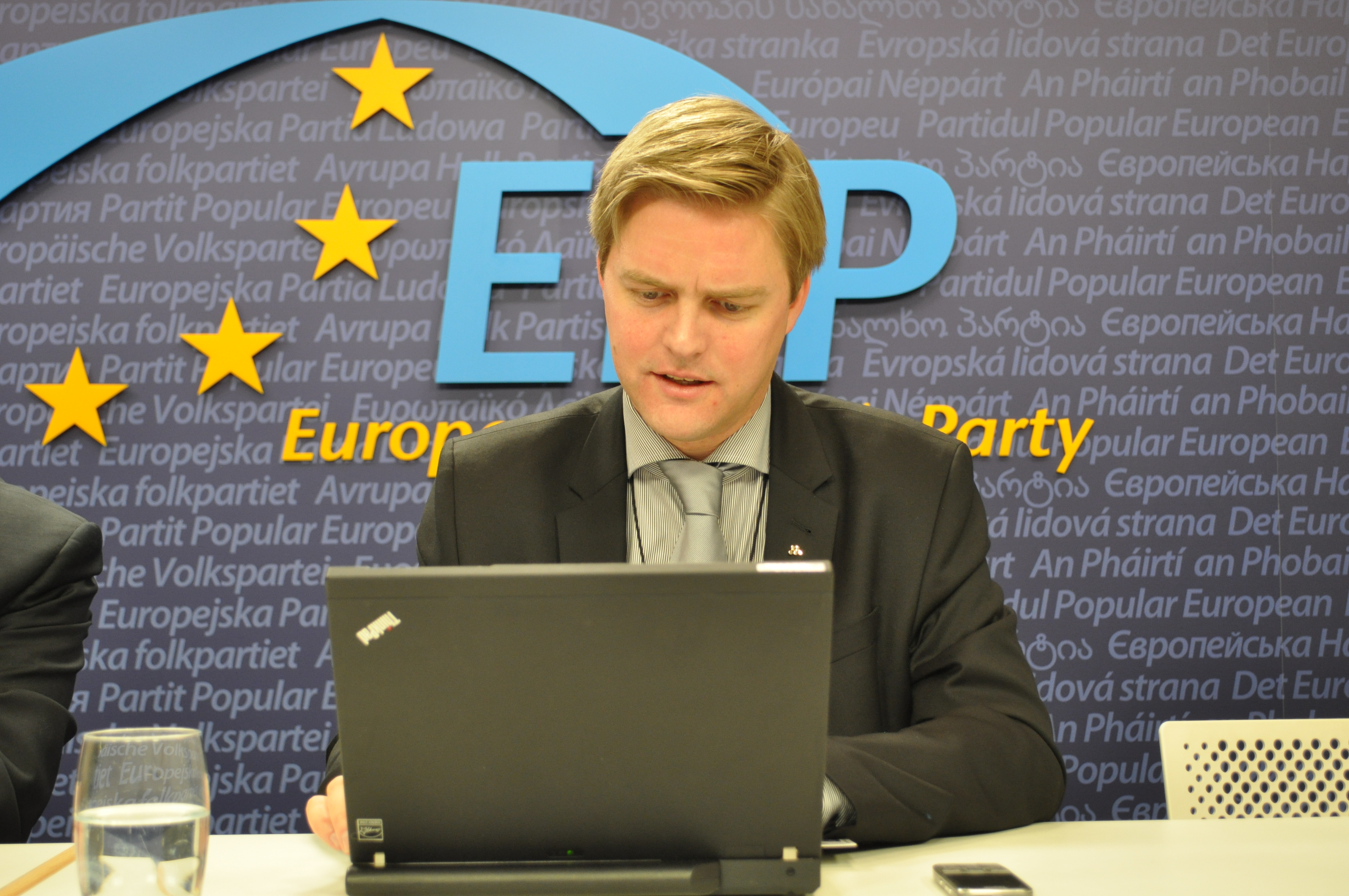

member of the Riksdag
- In office 2006–2018

Personal details
- Party: Moderate Party

Christian Holm Barenfeld, born 22 July 1976, is a Swedish politician for the Moderate Party. He was member of the Riksdag from 2006 to 2018. Christian Holm Barenfeld was a member of the Committee on Foreign Affairs, the Committee of the Labour Market and of the NATO Parliamentary Assembly as well as the OSCE Parliamentary Assembly. After leaving the parliament Christian Holm Barenfeld is involved in local politics in his hometown and is also running his own business.
