= Roine Carlsson =

Swedish politician (1937–2020)

Minister of Defence
- In office 1985–1991
- Preceded by: Anders Thunborg
- Succeeded by: Anders Björck

Personal details
- Born: 10 December 1937; Norrtälje, Sweden
- Died: 25 August 2020 (aged 82)
- Political party: Swedish Social Democratic Party
- Occupation: Politician

Roine Carlsson (10 December 1937 – 25 August 2020) was a Swedish social democratic politician. Carlsson was appointed Minister of Defence in 1985 and was a member of the Swedish parliament 1985–1991.

Political offices
Preceded by Anders Thunborg	Minister of Defence; 1985–1991	Succeeded by Anders Björck
