= Runar Patriksson =

Swedish politician (born 1944)

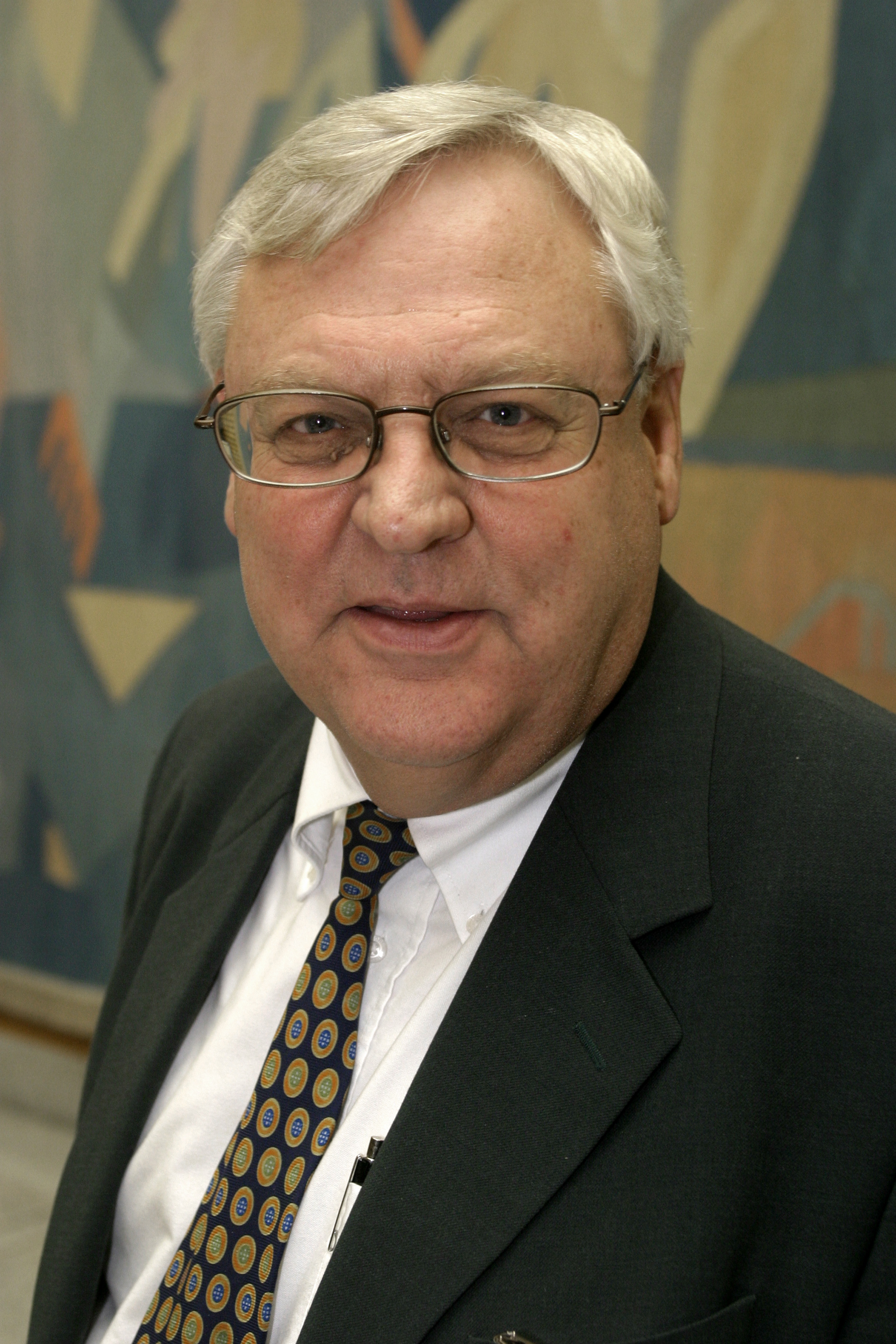

Runar Patriksson (born 1944) is a Swedish Liberal People's Party politician, member of the Riksdag 1998–2006.
