= Boroughs and districts of Gothenburg =

Divisions of Gothenburg Municipality, Sweden

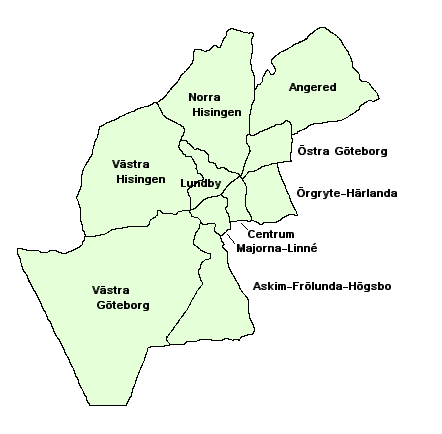
Map of Gothenburg districts from 2012-2020.

Gothenburg Municipality (Göteborgs kommun), Sweden is subdivided into 10 stadsdelsnämndsområden (roughly "city district committee areas"). The term is often translated to borough. But they are really not boroughs, as they are not legal entities or juristic persons of their own, but organs of the central municipal administration. The members of the committees are appointed by the kommunfullmäktige (municipal assembly) and not by the electorates of the respective "boroughs". They therefore represent the political majority of the municipality as a whole.

Gothenburg previously had 20 boroughs, but after a decision in the municipal assembly in January 2010 some of the boroughs were merged, leaving a total of 10 boroughs. The merge were implemented on 1 January 2011.

Each "borough" is divided into a number of officially defined residential districts (Swedish: primärområden). There are 94 districts. These are usually created by natural neighbourhoods, but sometimes consist of more than one traditional district.

The "boroughs" are responsible for, among other things, preschool, compulsory schooling, leisure, culture, social services, home-help service and care for the elderly.

Below is a list of the "boroughs" in Gothenburg, as well as the official districts. Also included are traditional districts, where these are part of an official district. The list of traditional districts is incomplete.

== List of boroughs in Gothenburg after the 2011 merge ==
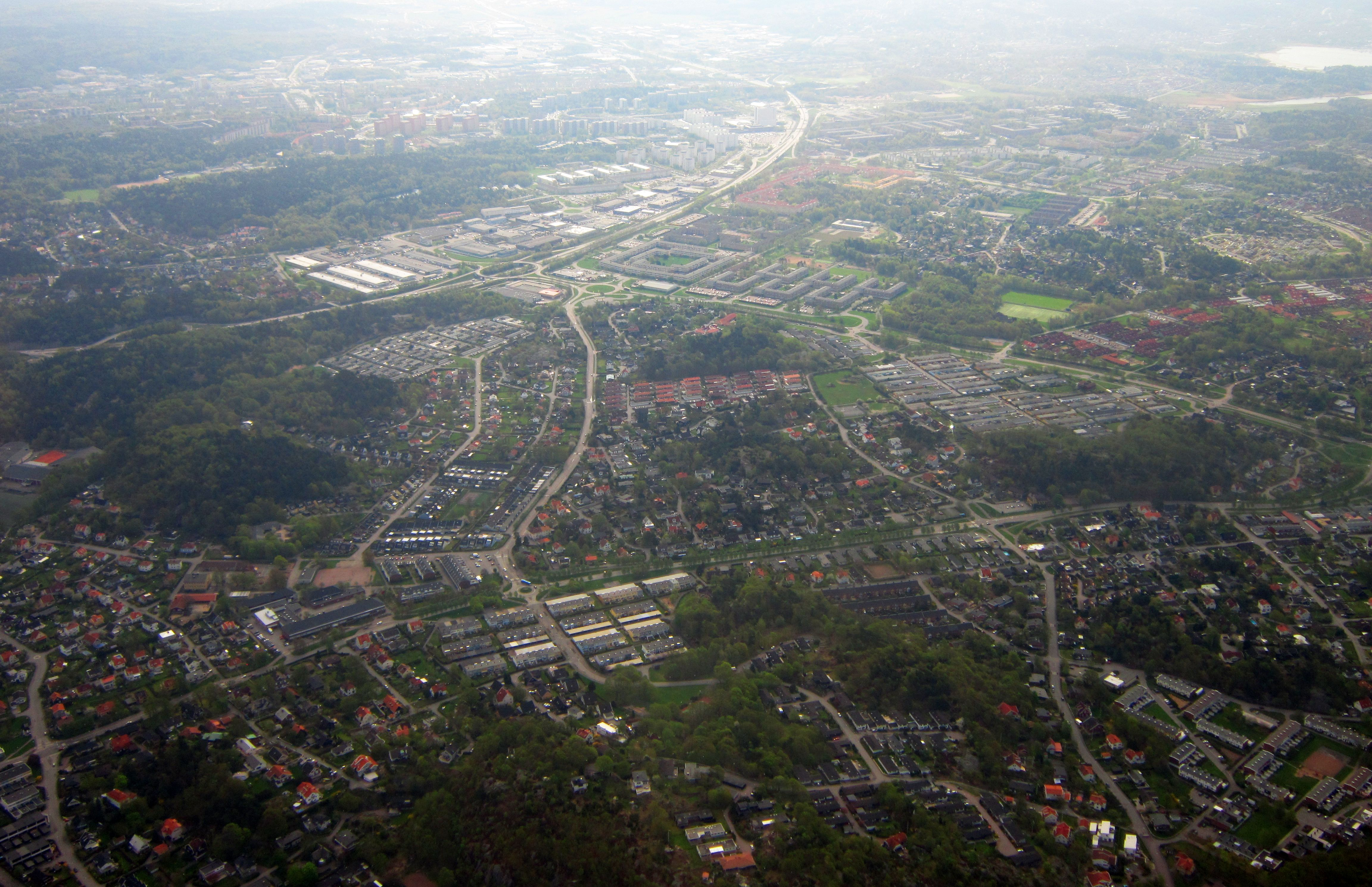
Western Gothenburg: Älvsborg (front), Tynnered (back right), Frölunda (back left)

- Norra Hisingen (Northern Hisingen) (Previously the boroughs Backa, Kärra-Rödbo and Tuve-Säve)
- Angered (Previously the boroughs Gunnared and Lärjedalen)
- Östra Göteborg (Eastern Gothenburg) (Previously the boroughs Bergsjön and Kortedala)
- Västra Hisingen (Western Hisingen) (Previously the boroughs Biskopsgården and Torslanda)
- Lundby
- Majorna-Linné (Previously the boroughs Linnéstaden and Majorna)
- Centrum
- Örgryte-Härlanda
- Västra Göteborg (Western Gothenburg) (Previously the boroughs Södra Skärgården and Tynnered/Älvsborg)
- Askim-Frölunda-Högsbo (Previously the boroughs Askim, Frölunda and Högsbo)

== Eastern Gothenburg ==
=== Härlanda borough ===
==== Officially defined districts ====
- Björkekärr
- Härlanda
- Kålltorp
- Torpa

==== Traditional districts ====
- Björkekärr
- Fräntorp
- Kålltorp
- Torpa
- Vidkärr

=== Örgryte borough ===
==== Officially defined districts ====
- Olskroken
- Redbergslid
- Bagaregården
- Kallebäck
- Skår
- Överås
- Kärralund
- Lunden

== Other ==
- Angered
  - Angereds Centrum (officially defined)
  - Hammarkullen (officially defined)
  - Lövgärdet (officially defined)
  - Rannebergen (officially defined)
  - Gårdstensbergen (officially defined)
  - Hjällbo (officially defined)
  - Eriksbo (officially defined)
  - Agnesberg (officially defined)
  - Linnarhult (officially defined)
  - Gunnilse (officially defined)
  - Bergum (officially defined)
- Askim
  - Askim (officially defined)
  - Hovås (officially defined)
  - Billdal
- Backa
  - Backa (officially defined)
  - Skogome (officially defined)
  - Brunnsbo (officially defined)
  - Skälltorp (officially defined)
- Bergsjön
  - Västra Bergsjön (officially defined)
  - Östra Bergsjön (officially defined)
- Biskopsgården
  - Norra Biskopsgården (officially defined)
  - Södra Biskopsgården (officially defined)
  - Jättesten (officially defined)
  - Svartedalen (officially defined)
  - Länsmansgården (officially defined)
- Centrum ("Centre")
  - Guldheden (officially defined)
  - Heden (officially defined)
  - Johanneberg (officially defined)
  - Krokslätt (officially defined)
  - Landala (officially defined)
  - Stampen (officially defined)
  - Vasastaden (officially defined)
  - Lorensberg (officially defined)
  - Inom Vallgraven (officially defined)
- Frölunda
  - Järnbrott (officially defined)
  - Tofta (officially defined)
  - Ruddalen (officially defined)
  - Frölunda Torg (officially defined)
- Högsbo
  - Kaverös (officially defined)
  - Flatås (officially defined)
  - Högsbohöjd (officially defined)
  - Högsbotorp (officially defined)
  - Högsbo (officially defined)
- Kortedala
  - Gamlestaden (officially defined)
  - Utby (officially defined)
  - Södra Kortedala (officially defined)
  - Norra Kortedala (officially defined)
- Kärra-Rödbo
  - Kärra (officially defined)
  - Rödbo (officially defined)
- Linnéstaden
  - Masthugget (officially defined)
  - Änggården (officially defined)
  - Haga (officially defined)
  - Annedal (officially defined)
  - Olivedal (officially defined)
- Lundby
  - Sannegården (officially defined)
  - Brämaregården (officially defined)
  - Kvillebäcken (officially defined)
  - Slättadamm (officially defined)
  - Kärrdalen (officially defined)
- Majorna
  - Kungsladugård (officially defined)
  - Sanna (officially defined)
  - Majorna (officially defined)
  - Stigberget (officially defined)
- Styrsö
  - Styrsö (officially defined)
    - Asperö
    - Brännö
    - Donsö
    - Köpstadsö
    - Styrsö
    - Vargö
    - Vrångö
- Torslanda
  - Hjuvik (officially defined)
  - Nolered (officially defined)
  - Björlanda (officially defined)
  - Arendal (officially defined)
- Tuve-Säve
  - Tuve (officially defined)
  - Säve (officially defined)
- Tynnered
  - Bratthammar (officially defined)
  - Guldringen (officially defined)
  - Skattegården (officially defined)
  - Ängås (officially defined)
  - Önnered (officially defined)
  - Grevegården (officially defined)
  - Näset (officially defined)
  - Kannebäck (officially defined)
- Älvsborg
  - Fiskebäck (officially defined)
  - Långedrag (officially defined)
  - Hagen (officially defined)
  - Grimmered (officially defined)
