= Härlanda =

City district of Gothenburg Municipality, Sweden

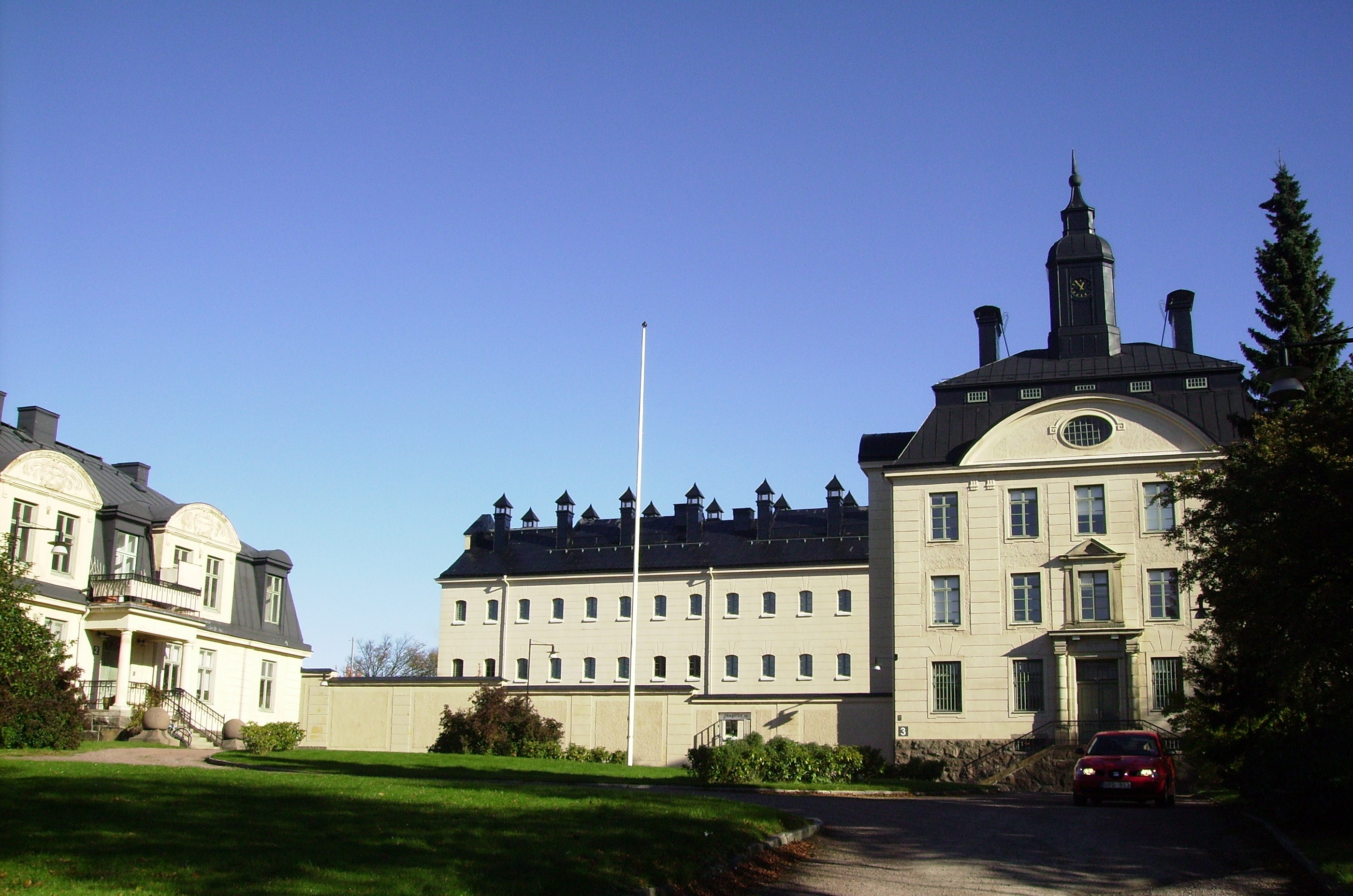
Härlanda Prison

Härlanda is one of the 21 stadsdelsnämndsområden (roughly "city district committee areas") of Gothenburg Municipality in Sweden, situated to the east of the city centre. To the east of Härlanda lies Partille Municipality, and to the south Härryda Municipality. In Gothenburg Municipality it borders Örgryte to the west and Kortedala to the north, across the stream Säveån.

It is largely a middle-class, residential area and mostly consists of apartment blocks built before 1960.

== Geography ==
Härlanda borough is composed of four officially defined residential districts:

- Björkekärr, which is based on the traditional district with the same name
- Härlanda, which consists of parts of the traditional districts Kålltorp and Vidkärr.
- Kålltorp, which includes most of the traditional district with the same name.
- Torpa, which consists of the traditional districts of Torpa, Fräntorp and parts of Vidkärr.

== Demographics ==
Härlanda has approximately 20 000 inhabitants, divided into 11 100 households, therefore a large proportion of the households are considered as small. Over 800 of the inhabitants are foreign citizens born abroad, and a further 130 are foreign citizens but born in Sweden. Almost 1500 inhabitants of Härlanda are first generation immigrants.

== Places of interest ==
Härlanda Park is a defunct prison where the local administration resides. It is now a listed historical building.

Härlanda Tjärn is, during the summertime, a popular place for sunbathing, and during the winter for ice-skating.

Brudaremossen masts located in the Delsjön nature reserve.

== Sports ==
Härlanda is home to the football club Qviding FIF which currently plays in Superettan, the second highest league in Sweden.
