= Tuve, Sweden =

Urban area in Gothenburg, Sweden

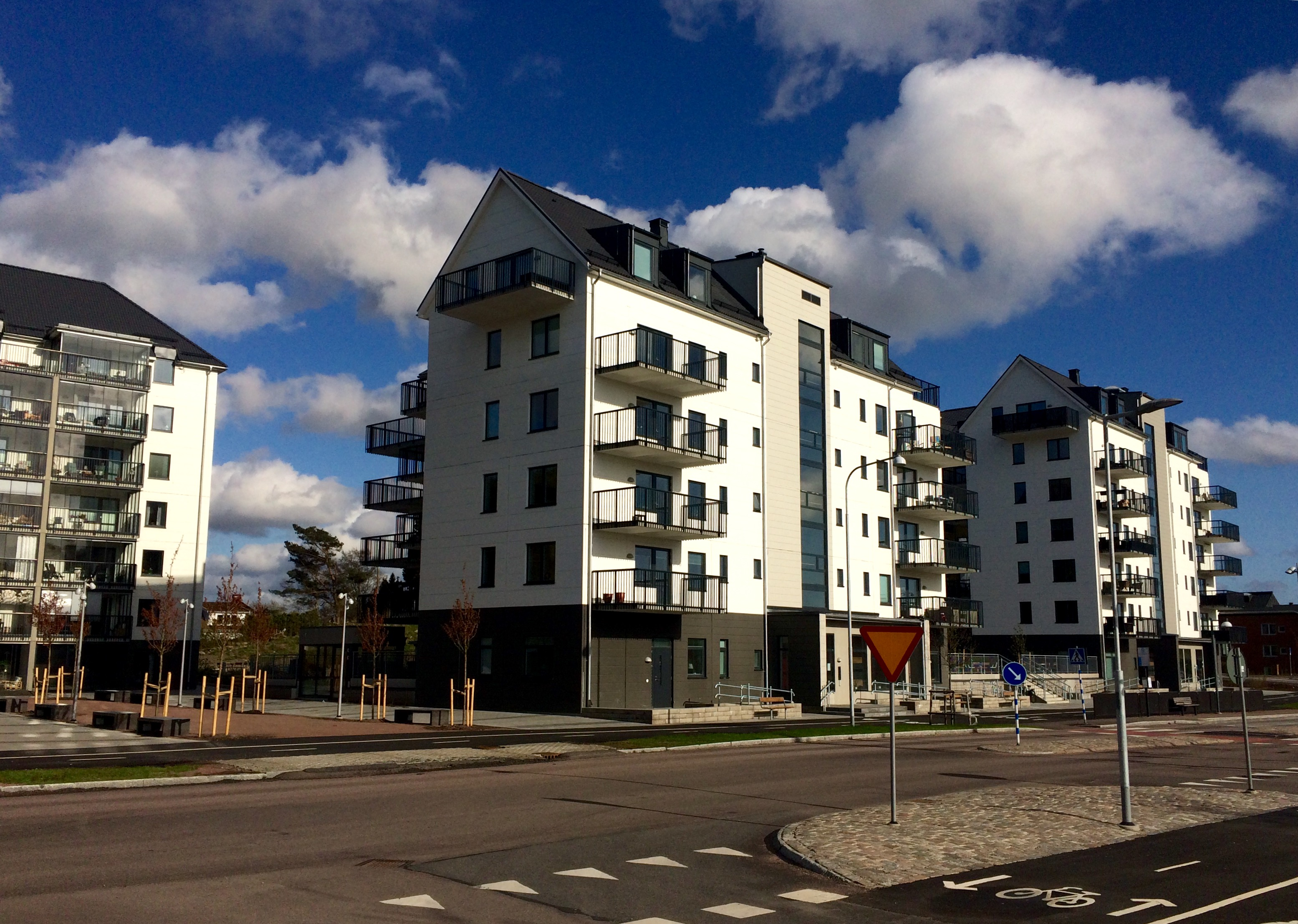

Tuve is a district of Norra Hisingen, Gothenburg, Sweden, covering an area of 1,720 hectares. As of 2017, it had a population of 9670. It was the location of the 1977 Tuve landslide. Within the Diocese of Gothenburg, it is covered by the Tuve-Säve parrish. Tuve Church is located in the district. Carmaker Volvo has a plant in Tuve.
