= Bergsjön =

Urban area in Gothenburg, Sweden

Coordinates: 57.75612°N 12.07068°E

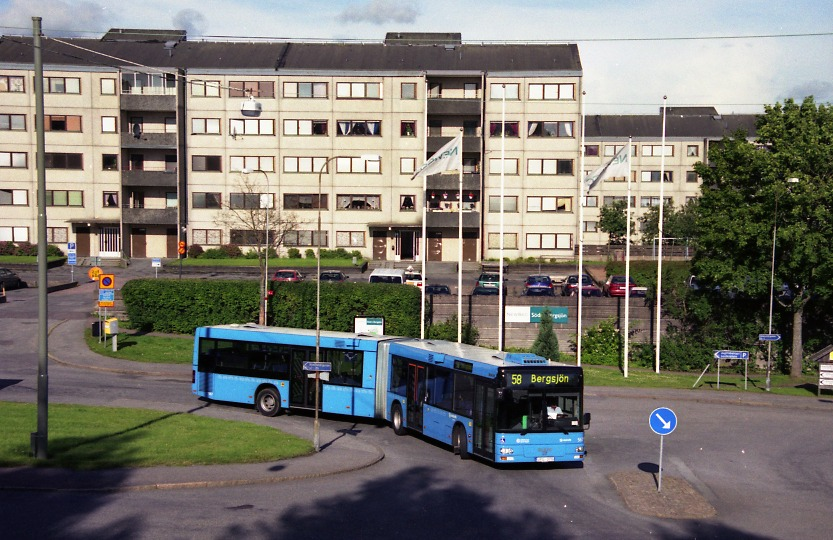
Street in Bergsjön

Bergsjön is a district in eastern Gothenburg, Sweden. On January 1, 2011, Bergsjön and Kortedala became the Eastern District of Gothenburg as part of a larger reorganization of the city of Gothenburg; the number of district councils was halved, to ten. Bergsjön, as part of Eastern District of Gothenburg, is divided into two smaller areas: Western and Eastern Bergsjön. In Eastern Bergsjön construction and development in the area began in 1965, and in Western Bergsjön development started in 1967.

According to Göteborgsbladet 2010 (in which data for district councils and areas in Gothenburg are presented), West Bergsjön has 7,239 inhabitants and East Bergsjön has 8,534 residents; Therefore, the district has 15,773 inhabitants. During the 1900s, a number of Sweden's new residents moved into Bergsjön; as of 2011, there are over 140 nationalities represented in the district.

'Bergsjön' literally translates to 'The Mountain Lake' and is named after the lake with the same name south of the district.

== History ==
During the 17th century, the forests began to disappear; at that time, Gothenburg had a great need for wood. By the end of the 18th century, the forests were gone. The current spruce forest in Bergsjön was planted about 1910. In the late 19th and early 20th century, the first few houses were built in Bergsjön. The houses were simple, often with only one room, a fireplace and an earthen floor. Dykärr at Rymdtorget, Spakens on Björnväktarens Street and Gröna Vrån near Galileis Street are some of these houses.

The Gärdsås residential area began to develop during the 1920s, and are considered the first modern buildings in Bergsjön. Communications and services were poor, but low land prices made the area attractive to workers in the factories of Gamlestaden. The simpler residences disappeared when the construction of modern Bergsjön began, although one older home was inhabited until 1990: Gåselyckan, in the southern part of Bergsjövallen, which was built in 1916. The construction of modern Bergsjön began during the 1960s as a planned community. All streets and neighbourhoods were given space-theme names; the 1960s were the Space Age, when satellites were launched to explore outer space. During the previous decade, the new suburbs were called “satellite cities” which surrounded the centre of a city. Housing consisted of rental apartments, condominiums, townhouses and villas.

Most streets in Bergsjön are named after things related to space such as Galieis gata (Galileis street), Rymdtorget (Space Square) and Atmosfärgatan (Atmosphere street). This is also due to space being relevant at the time because of the satellites being sent up by the Soviets among others.

When the ground was broken in 1965 for home construction, it was a thin layer of soil over two-billion-year-old bedrock. New neighbourhoods were needed during the industry expansions of the 1960s, when Backa and Västra Frölunda were planned. Gothenburg was fully developed and the outlying areas in the 1959 general plan were next. In the forested area beyond the end of the tram line in Kortedala, the line was extended. Bergsjön, a compromise solution in a time of development pressure, began to be planned in 1963.

Inhabitants in Bergsjön have a low education level compared to other districts, where 14% of the population have post-secondary education of 3+ years in length, which is four times lower than the best-educated area of Gothenburg. About 4 in 10 of pupils do not reach the minimum grades to attend secondary school, which is the lowest of any district in Gothenburg, compared to 20% of all pupils in Gothenburg. Bergsjön has the lowest employment rate of Gothenburg districts with 45% of the workforce in employment and the lowest average income. Conversely, Bergsjön has a high proportion of households receiving income support. With less than half (46%) of the electorate bothering to vote, Bergsjön has the next-to-lowest degree of participation in local elections in Gothenburg after Gårdsten.

Since 2015, Bergsjön has been classified as a särskilt utsatt område (especially vulnerable area) by the Swedish Police.

In July 2018, the camera surveillance in the area was intensified as police had problems getting terrified witnesses to testify in court trials. The intensification also comprised Gothenburg Biskopsgården and Angered.

== Ecology ==
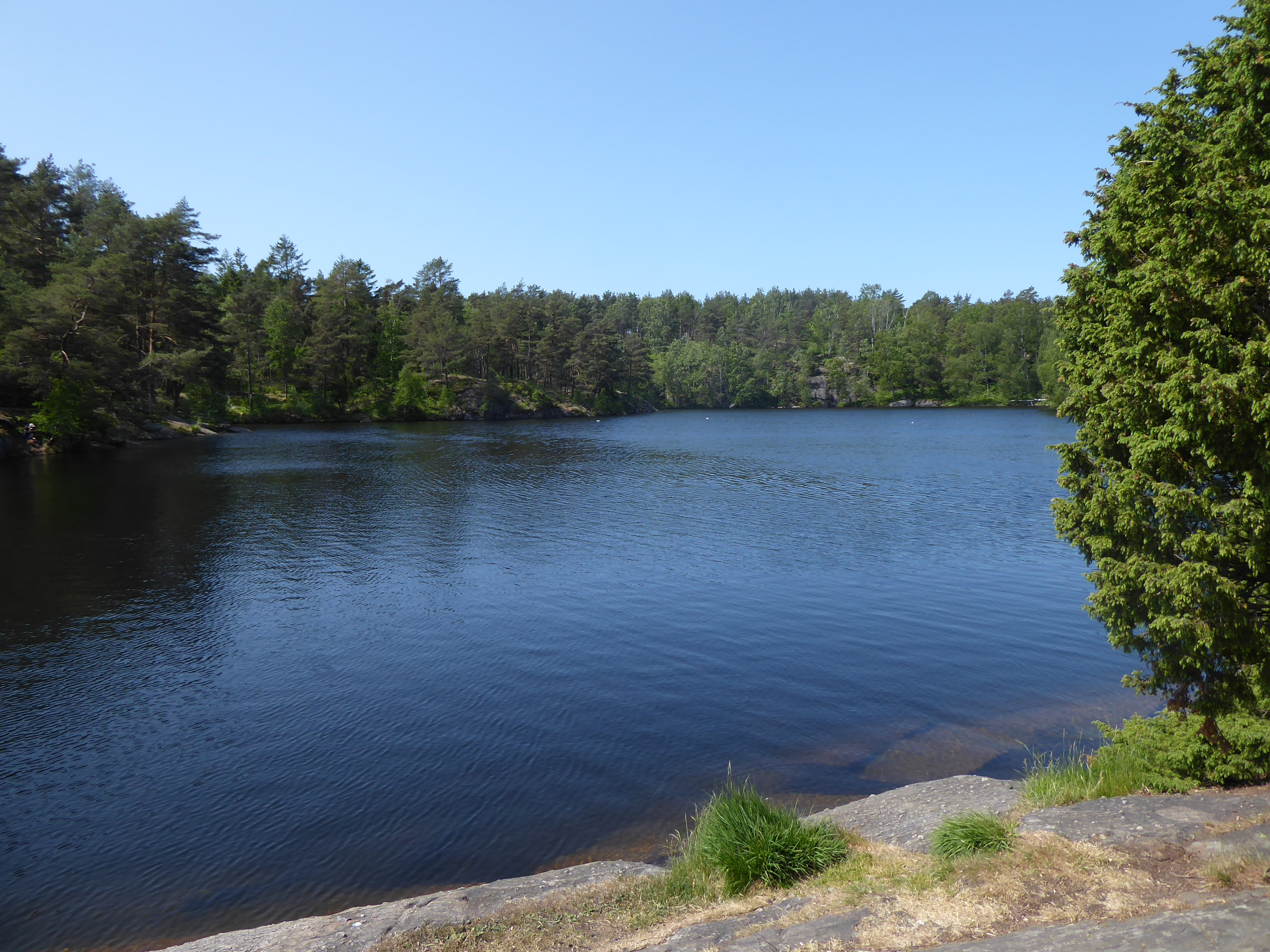
The lake Bergsjön

Bergsjön is one of Göteborg's smaller district councils, with clean air and hilly landscapes. Bergsjön is also Göteborg's highest district council in elevation, with its water tower reaching 492 feet (150 m) above sea level as its highest point. It is a green, scenic area. Bergsjön's landscape consists of two ridges with intermediate valleys. In the southern part there is a small lake (Lake Bergsjön). Around the lake is a recreation area of approximately 40 hectares (99 acres) which is used for walking, fishing and ice skating. In the northern part of Bergsjön is also a walking area of approximately 40 hectares in the area adjacent to the Lärjeån River.

In the district there are large areas of mature natural areas between the neighborhoods. In the southwest region is Gärdsmossen: a green belt in an old bog which was drained during the 1970s. The bog is part of a continuous green belt from Kviberg in the south to the exercise facility in Geråshallen and the Lärjeån valley in the north. The area is covered by mostly deciduous trees, but also with pine forests and remnants of former wetland vegetation. In the southern part, north of Utby, is a small hardwood forest. The eastern forest is contiguous forest with the small lakes and wetlands extending into the Partille and Paradisets resort regions and Sörbergen (south of Gunnilse).

== Public transport ==
Bergsjön is approximately 20 minutes from central Gothenburg by public transportation. Since many inhabitants of Bergsjön do not own an automobile, public transportation is a priority. There is a central tramway with four stops, running east–west through the district. Two tram lines have their final stop at Komettorget. Tram stops have also been refurbished and rebuilt, to create a safer (and more attractive) station environment. From Drottningstorget, bus service runs through the eastern areas of Bergsjön to Merkuriusgatan and a bus runs from Komettorget to Angered Centrum.

== Education ==
In Bergsjön, there are five elementary schools; two run from preschool to ninth grade. The schools are:

- Bergsjöskolan
- Backegårdsskolan
- Gärdsmosseskolan
- Sandeklevsskolan
- Solbackeskolan

A great deal of consideration is given to schools in Bergsjön in language instruction, to help children and young people to function well in Swedish society. Within this area, the mother tongue of the children and identity development are important. More than one-third of students in Bergsjön schools have lived in Sweden for less than four years. For newly arrived students there are introductory schools, which help them take the first steps toward integrating into Swedish society. Over 80 percent of students in Bergsjön have Swedish as a second language; therefore, most preschools and schools focus on language development. Bergsjöskolan and Sandeklevsskolan are the district's middle schools, which are open for students, parents and organizations in the late afternoon and evening to strengthen the school's role in the district and increase the motivation to study.

== Culture ==
Bergsjögården, which opened on 4 February 1970, is a performance venue in Bergsjön. An early performance group was a musical theater ensemble (originally from Lund known as the Nationalteatern. Youth organizations such as Levande Live were also active in Bergsjögården; the organization, formed in the early 1990s, had its own studio where it made musical recordings.

A variety of cultures also contribute to music in Bergsjön; for example, when a Bosnian family lived in Bergsjön in the mid-1990s their children played traditional music from Bosnia combined with hard rock music they called “Sarajevo death metal”. Contributing to the different cultural influences in Bergsjön are about 80 organizations active in the district. They offer a wide range of leisure activities; in addition to traditional activities such as football, handball and outdoor sports, there is the Galaxy amusement park, the Geråshallen exercise facility, community radio and cultural activities.

== See also ==
- Gothenburg quadricentennial jubilee
