= Vidkärr =

Urban district in Gothenburg, Sweden

Coordinates: 57.72224°N 12.03220°E

Vidkärr or Munkebäck is a district in Gothenburg, Sweden that belongs to Härlanda borough. The district is demarcated by the districts Strömmensberg to the west, Torpa to the east, Kålltorp to the south (by Torpagatan) and by the road E20 to the north. The commuter train between Gothenburg and Alingsås stops here at Sävenäs.

Here you can find Torpavallen, the home arena of the football team Qviding FIF.
