= Dime Jankulovski =

Swedish footballer (born 1977)

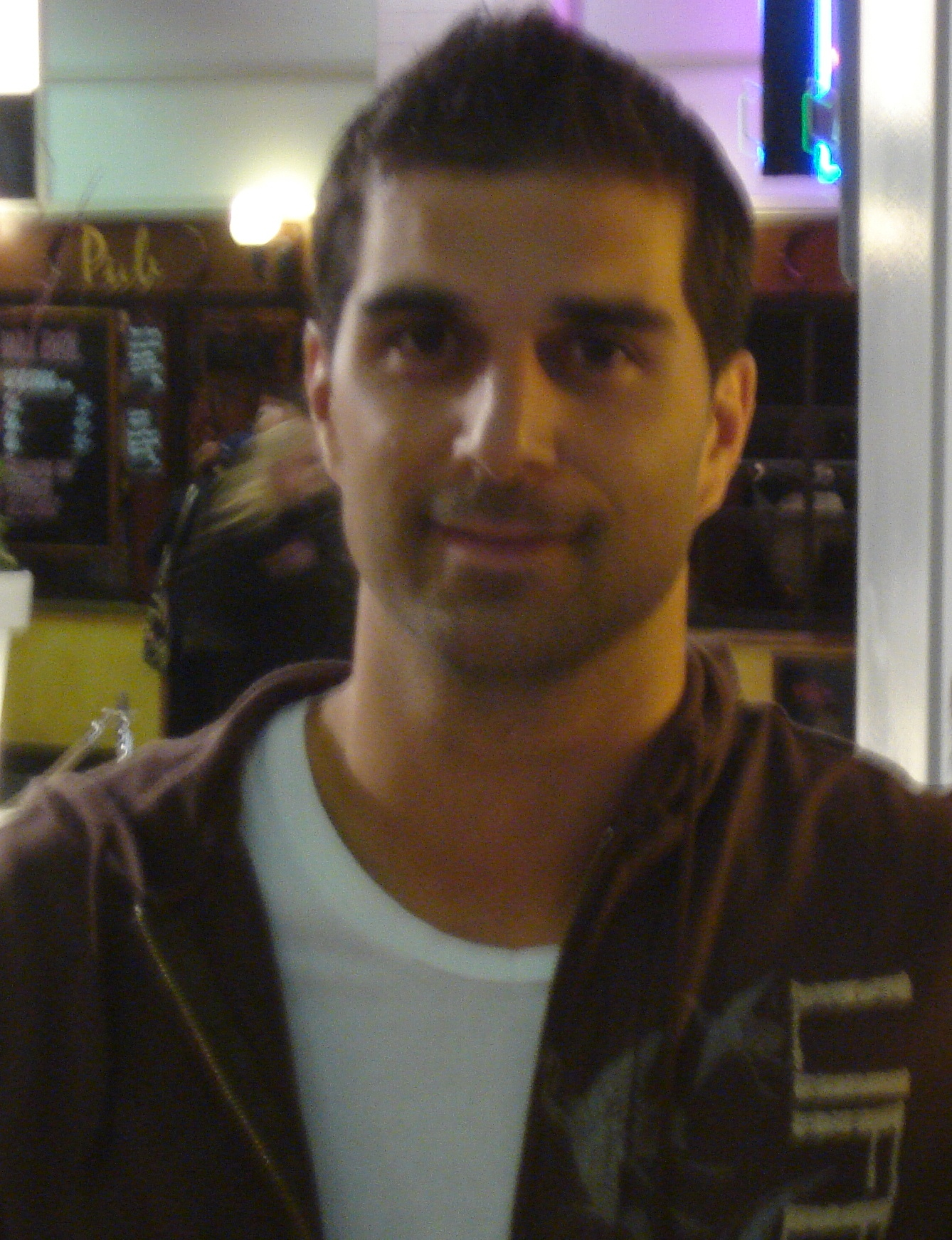
- Jankulovski in 2007

Personal information
- Date of birth: 18 June 1977 (age 49)
- Place of birth: Gothenburg, Sweden
- Height: 1.88 m (6 ft 2 in)
- Position: Goalkeeper

Team information
- Current team: Västra Frölunda (assistant)

Youth career
- 1982–1989: Rannebergens IF
- 1990–1992: GAIS
- 1993–1996: Lundby IF

Senior career*
Years	Team	Apps	(Gls)
1996–1997	Lundby IF	21	(0)
1998–2001	Västra Frölunda	56	(0)
2001	→ AIK (loan)	11	(0)
2002–2003	IK Start	14	(0)
2003–2004	IFK Norrköping	13	(0)
2003	→ Örgryte IS (loan)	4	(0)
2004	→ Raufoss IL (loan)	19	(0)
2005–2012	GAIS	200	(0)
2014	BK Häcken	0	(0)
2015–2017	Örgryte IS	0	(0)

International career
1998–1999	Sweden U21	9	(0)
2000	Sweden	1	(0)

Managerial career
- 2013: GAIS (assistant)
- 2014: Lärje-Angered IF
- 2020–: Västra Frölunda (assistant)
- * Club domestic league appearances and goals

Dime Jankulovski (Macedonian: Диме Јанкуловски; born 18 June 1977) is a Swedish football coach and former professional player who currently is the assistant coach of Västra Frölunda IF. He played as a goalkeeper.

== Club career ==
Having started his youth years at Rannebergens IF, Jankulovski shortly after moved to join GAIS youth section. Due to financial difficulties for the youth section, he was forced to depart the club and ended up at Lundby IF, where he eventually made his senior team debut.

Jankulovski's playing in Lundby attracted the attention of local rival Västra Frölunda IF, and he signed for them prior to the 1998 season, helping them to 5th place in the 1998 season, ending up ahead of local rivals IFK Göteborg. The following seasons did not go as well and eventually saw the club relegated at the end of the 2000 season. He decided not to follow and was instead loaned out to Swedish top club AIK. Due to an injury and surgery, Jankulovski was unable to fully compete for the goalkeeper position until after the season had started, and he made his debut against Carmarthen Town in the 2001 Intertoto Cup, followed by 11 straight games in Allsvenskan. In the second Tvillingderbyt of the season, Jankulovski injured himself, and the injury prevented him from playing any more matches that season.

AIK decided not to sign Jankulovski after the season and he returned to Västra Frölunda. Frölunda, however, decided to go for young and talented John Alvbåge rather than Jankulovski, and after a few failed attempts they were able to release him to Norwegian club IK Start. Following a promising start, having been voted player of the month in April, Jankulovski suffered a three-match ban, while at the same time the club sacked Jan Halvor Halvorsen as manager of the club, the new manager Guðjón Þórðarson, did sidline [sic?] Jankulovski, and on top of it all IK Start suffered from economic difficulties, resulting in the club selling several of its players and Jankulovski had his contract terminated. As Balázs Rabóczki left IFK Norrköping, the club decided to sign Jankulovski on a three-year contract as a replacement.

Jankulovski's time in IFK Norrköping was not successful, as he was early loaned out to Örgryte IS, returning to Norrköping he ended up as second choice behind Andreas Lindberg and the club decided to yet again loan him out, this time to 1. divisjon club Raufoss IL.

Returning to Norrköping, both Jankulovski and the club decided to release him from his contract and Jankulovski returned home to Göteborg and GAIS.

== International career ==
Jankulovski represented Sweden's U21 team in 9 games. In 2000, he was called up to Sweden national team for a match against Norway on 4 February, which ended 1–1.

== Coaching and later career ==
On 8 October 2012, it was announced that Jankulovski would become new assistant manager to Thomas Askebrand in 2013. He left the position in November 2013. At the end of the same month, he was hired head coach of Lärje-Angered IF for the 2014 season. In March 2014, he also signed with BK Häcken as a back-up keeper, training one or two times a week and eventually sit on the bench if one of the two goalkeepers was unavailable.

In the summer 2015, Jankulovski returned to Örgryte IS as a goalkeeper coach and back-up keeper. He left the position as goalkeeper coach at the end of December 2019.

At the end of December 2019 it was confirmed, that Jankulovski had been appointed assistant coach of his former club Västra Frölunda IF under newly appointed manager and Jankulovski's former teammate Fredrik Björck. As of March 2023 he coaches his daughter's youth football team Sävedalens IF.

== Personal life ==
Jankulovski played both football and handball in his youth but stopped with handball when debuting for Lundby IF's senior team, he also been a GAIS supporter since young years and saw several matches from GAIS support section on Gamla Ullevi.
