= Härlanda Prison =

Prison in Gothenburg, Sweden

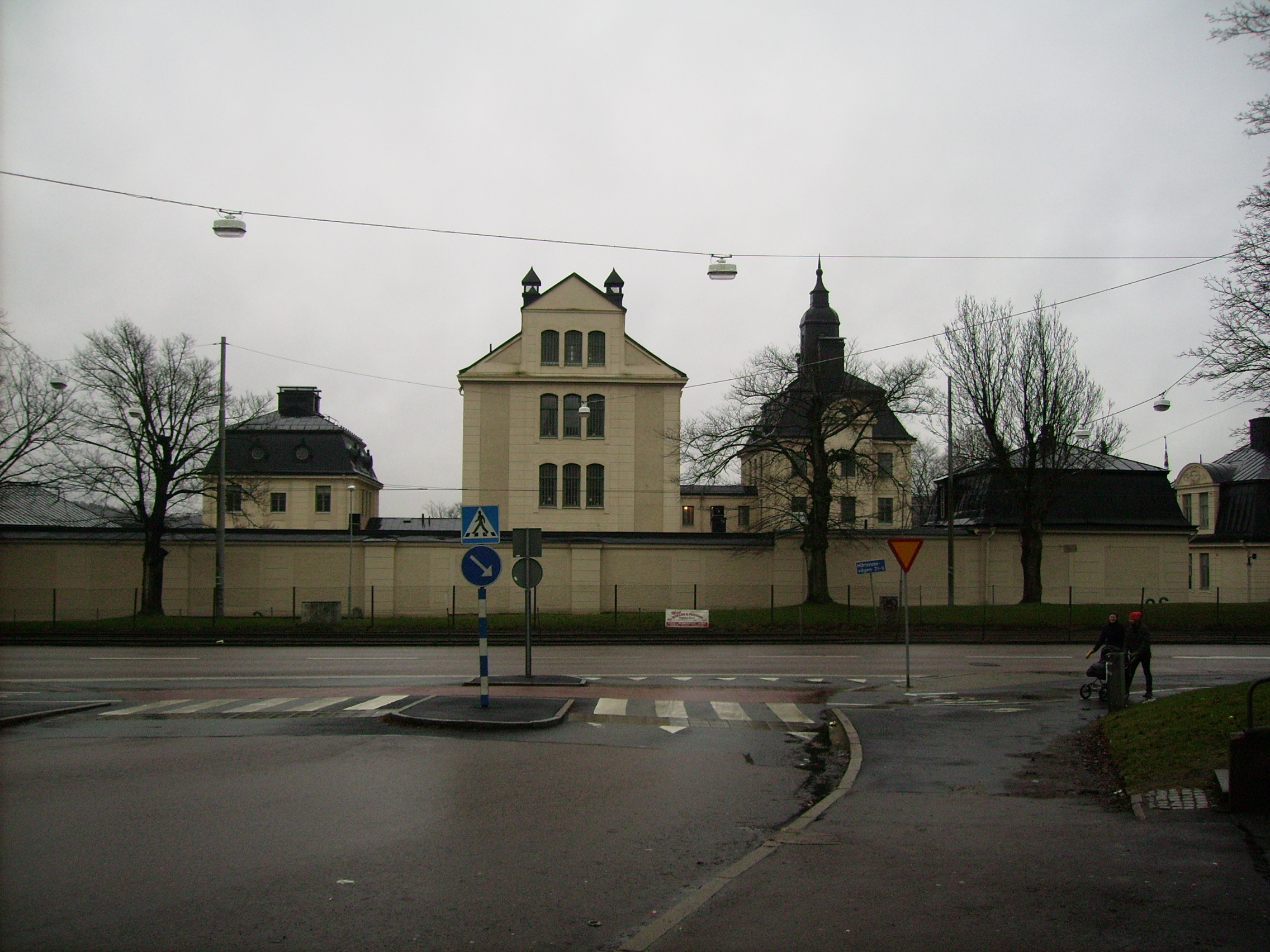
View of the old prison

Härlanda fängelse (Härlanda Prison) is a defunct prison in Härlanda borough, Gothenburg, Sweden. Under the name Härlanda park, it is now home to, among other things, the local administration.

== History ==
It was designed by the architect Gustaf Lindgren and ready for use in 1907. In 1997 it was declared a listed historical building, and as such protected from demolishing. The last prisoner moved out of the prison in 1997.
