= Gustav Lundgren =

Gustav Lundgren may refer to:

- Gustav Lundgren (musician) (born 1980), Swedish guitarist
- Gustav Lundgren (footballer) (born 1995), Swedish football winger

== See also ==
- Gustaf Lindgren (1863-1930), Swedish architect
- Gustav Lindgren (born 2001), Swedish football striker
