= Shadieh Heydari =

Swedish politician (born 1967)

Shadiye Heydari
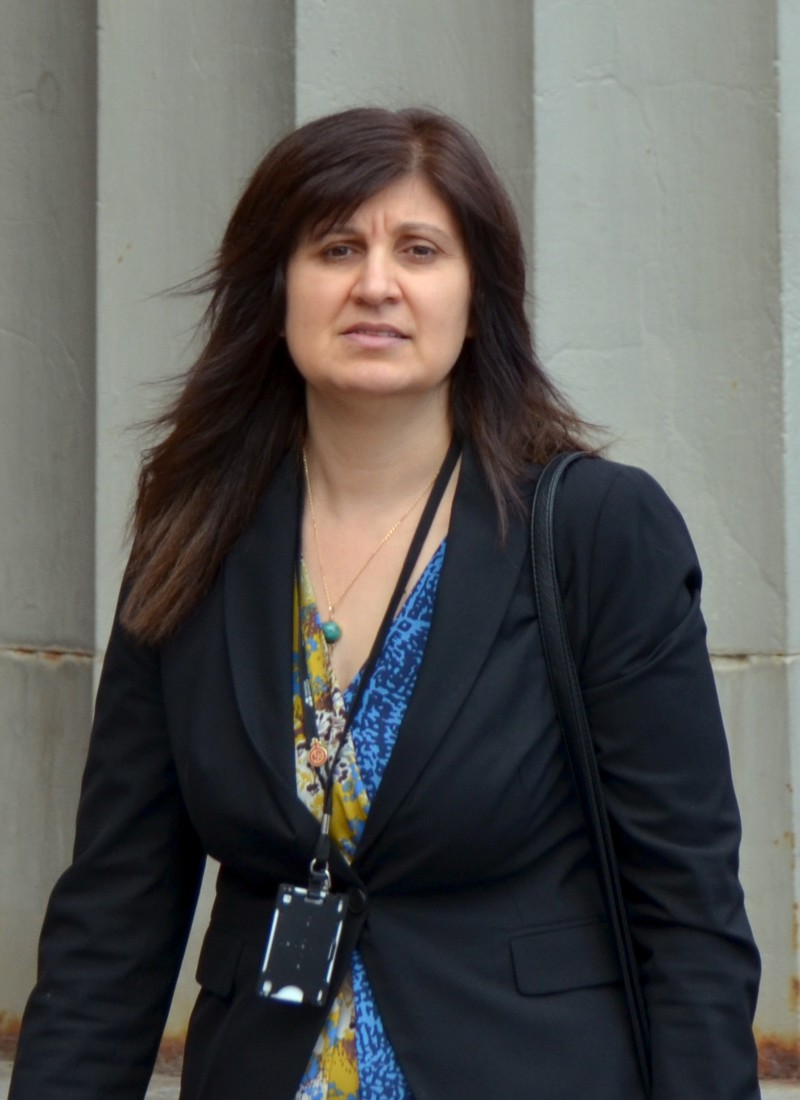

Member of the Riksdag
- Incumbent
- Assumed office 18 June 2010
- Constituency: Gothenburg County
- In office 17 June 2010 – 16 February 2014
- Constituency: Gothenburg County

Personal details
- Born: 15 May 1967 (age 58) Saqqez, Kurdistan province, Imperial State of Iran
- Party: Social Democrats
- Occupation: Social work

Shadiye Heydari (Persian: شادیه حیدری; born 15 May 1967) is a Swedish politician (Social Democrat), who was a Member of Parliament 2010–2017, elected for the Gothenburg Municipality constituency.

== Life ==
Heydari comes from the Iranian part of Saqqez, Kurdistan, and came to Sweden in 1986. She lived in Sundsvall for ten years, and moved to Gothenburg in 1996, where she lives with her husband and their two children.

== Activities ==
With an academic background in social work, she has worked as an assistant teacher, interpreter, administrator and unit manager in health and care. Prior to her assignment as a Member of Parliament, Heydari was involved as a politician for eight years, first as chairman of the social committee and then as chairman of Lärjedalen's district committee.

During Shadiye's first term in the Riksdag from 2010 to 2014, she was a member of the Social Insurance Committee and a deputy in the Social Affairs Committee. After the formation of the government in 2014, she returned to the Riksdag as Deputy Prime Minister for Anna Johansson. During her second term as a member of the Riksdag, Heydari was a deputy member of the Civil Affairs Committee, the Foreign Affairs Committee, and a Personal Deputy Member of the Board of the Riksbank's Jubilee Fund. When Johansson left the government in July 2017, Heydari had to leave the Riksdag.

Heydari also has several member assignments, including as a board member of the Workers' Education Association in Gothenburg, the municipal parent company Förvaltnings AB Framtiden in Gothenburg and the S-association faith and solidarity at Hisingen. She sits on the district board for Social Democratic Women in Sweden – Gothenburg and on the nomination committee for Social Democratic Women's Future Club, Hammarkullen's Social Democratic Association and the Kurdish Social Democratic Association. She is also the convener of the Angered district's nomination committee. In addition to these, she has undertaken additional assignments and is a member of several associations.

She is and has also been active in non-profit contexts with an extensive commitment over the years. Among other things, Heydari has conducted project work concerning public education on human rights and disability between Sweden and Kurdistan.

Heydari presents himself at Bokmässan 2012
