= Lärjedalen =

Coordinates: 57.76961°N 12.01787°E

Lärjedalen is a locality and former district council area in the south of the former municipality Angered, Gothenburg Municipality in Västra Götaland County, Sweden. It got its name from the river Lärjeån that crosses the municipality.

Great parts of the area are nature reserves.

The "center" of Lärjedalen was the suburb Hjällbo. In 2011, as part of a city-wide reorganisation the district was amalgamated with the adjacent council area Gunnared to form the new Angered borough.

Hammarkullen in Northern Lärjedalen
