= Tuve landslide =

1977 landslide in Sweden

Coordinates: 57°45′41″N 11°56′19″E

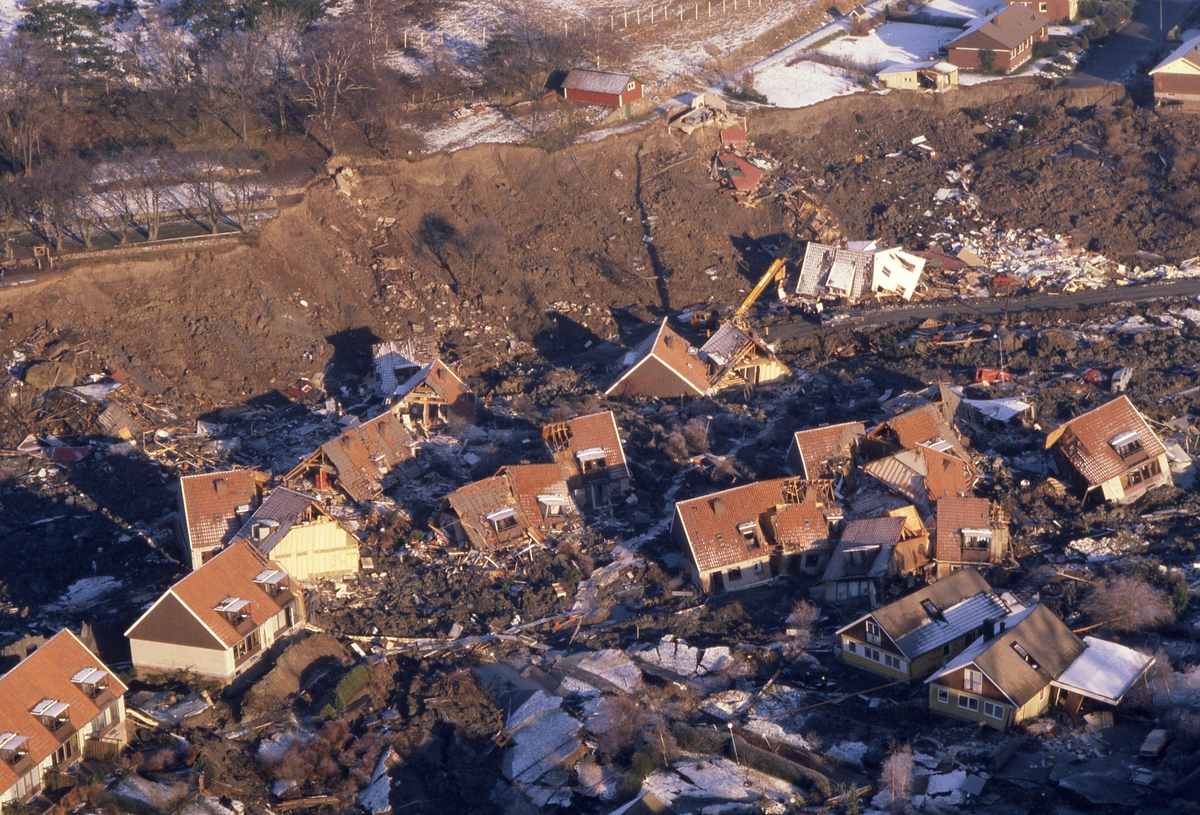
Aerial photograph over the affected area

The Tuve landslide was a large landslide in Tuve, Gothenburg, Sweden on 30 November 1977. Some 67 houses were destroyed, killing 9, injuring about 60 and making around 600 people homeless. The slide began at 16.05 and lasted 5–6 minutes. The slide affected 270 000 square meters (27 hectares). About 600 people lived in the area; of these, approximately 200 were in the area at the time of the slide. About 100 needed help by rescue workers. It was the most severe landslide in the modern history of Sweden.

Close to one kilometer of the nearby road was destroyed. It is estimated that three to four million cubic meters of soil were involved in the slide and further would not have fertility to grow crops. The total economic cost of the slide has been estimated to 140 million SEK (15 million EUR, 22 million USD).

== Cause ==
The slide was caused by heavy rain and an unstable slope.

== Aftermath ==
After the slide it was concluded that many areas were built without a proper prior geotechnical investigation. It was decided to chart up the stability of built-up areas of municipalities.

== Further resources ==
- Sveriges Radio P3 Dokumentär: Raskatastrofen i Tuve by Kristofer Hansson. First broadcast on 5 oktober 2008 18.03-20.00. . Radio documentary with interviews.
