= Brudaremossen masts =

331m high mast in Delsjön

Coordinates: 57°41′37″N 12°3′32″E

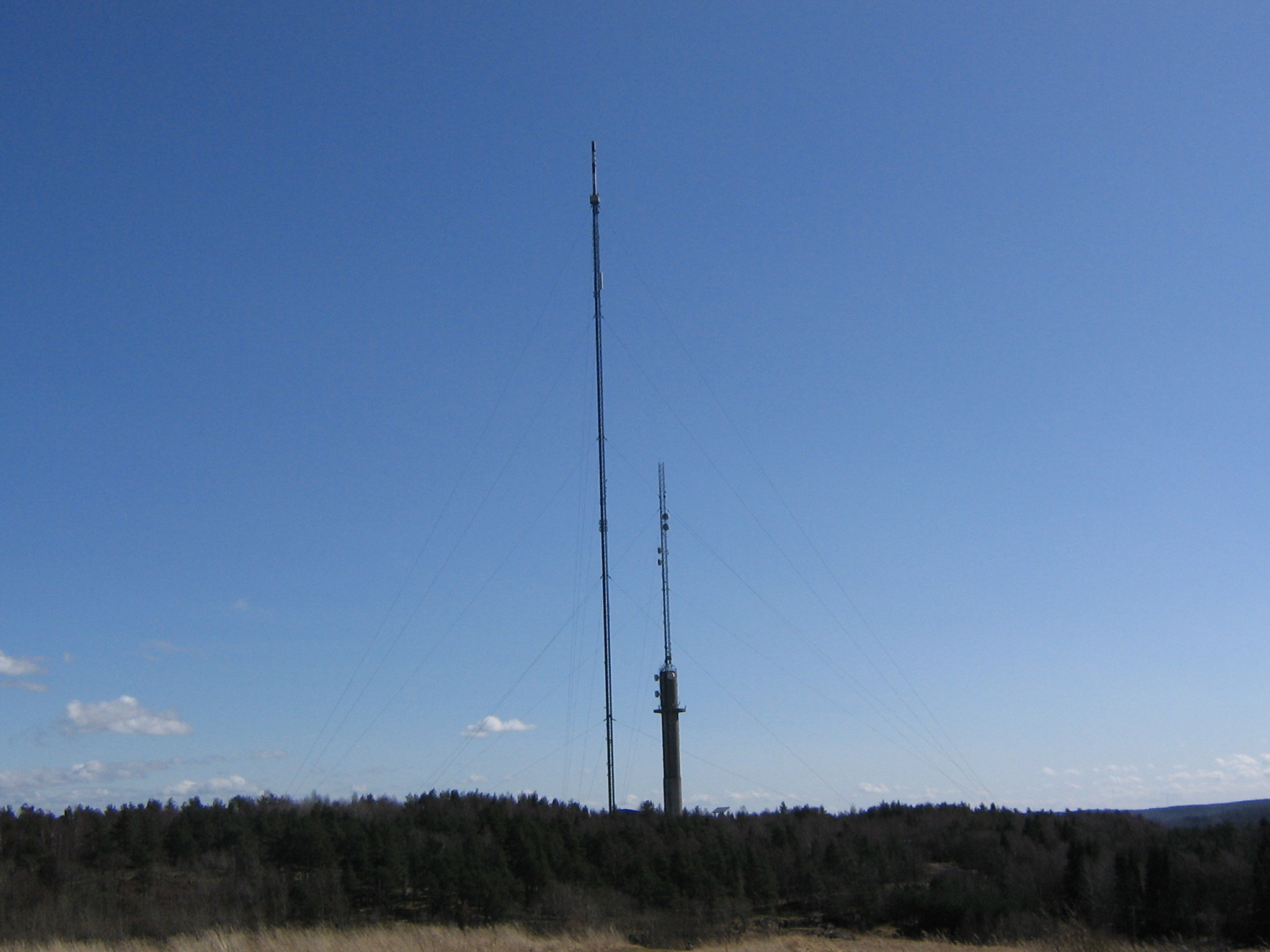
Brudaremossen mast (left) and TV tower (right)

The Brudaremossen mast (Swedish: Brudaremossenmasten) is a 331 metres (1,086 ft) high mast in Delsjön in eastern Gothenburg, Sweden, built in 1980 to replace the overloaded, 20-year-old TV tower.

Brudaremossen TV tower is a 70-metre (230 ft) high concrete tower with a guyed lattice steel mast on its top. The complete structure is 172 metres (564 ft) tall. An observation deck is located 60 metres above the ground in the concrete tower.

== See also ==
- List of masts
