= Lärjeån =

Coordinates: 57°46′N 12°00′E

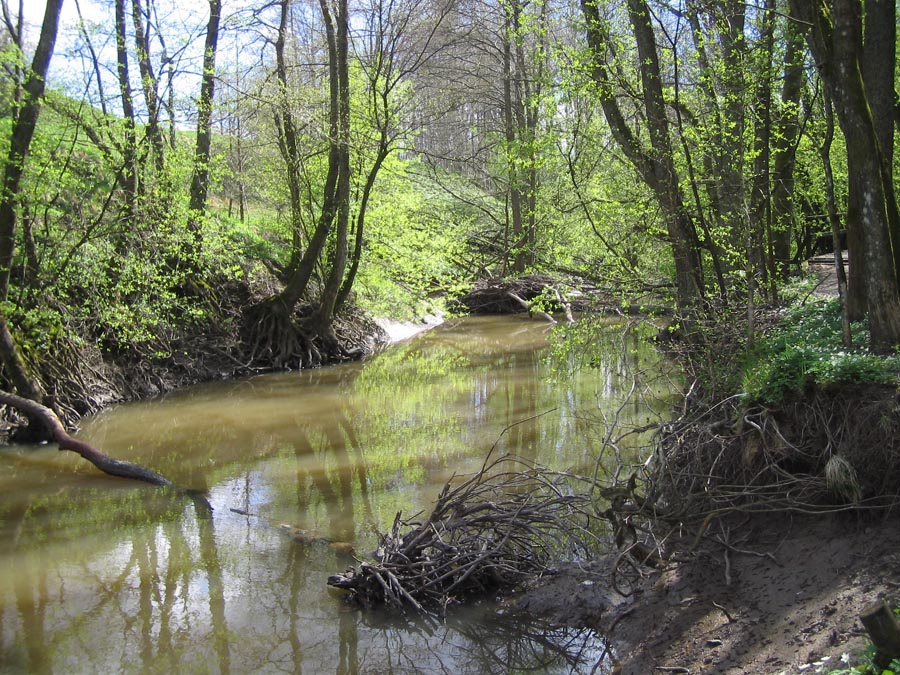
- Lärjeån between Gunillse and Linnarhullt.

Location
- Country: Sweden

Physical characteristics
- Length: 55 km (34 mi)

Lärjeån is a Swedish river that flows from Stora Lövsjön, east of Gothenburg, to the Göta älv in the northern Lärjedalen valley.
