= Tuve Church =

Church in Gothenburg Municipality, Sweden

Coordinates: 57°45′58″N 11°55′59″E

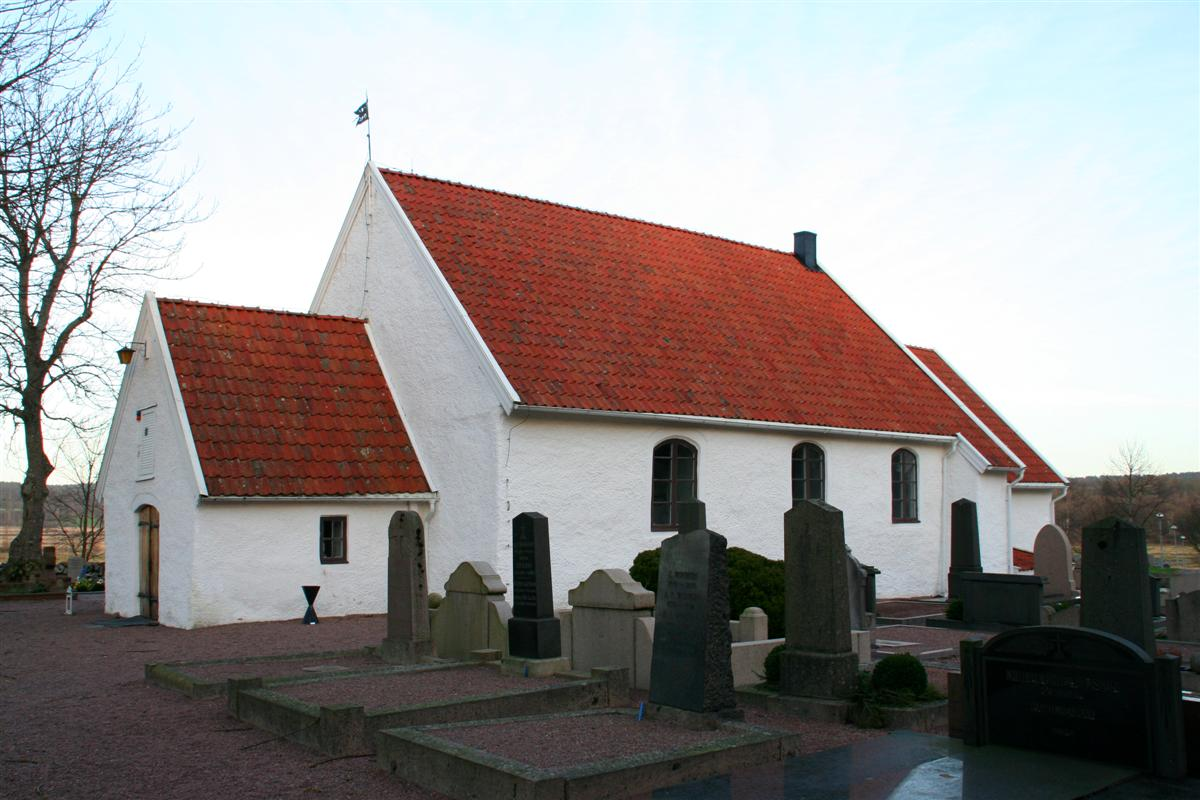
Tuve Church

The Tuve Church (Swedish: Tuve kyrka) is a medieval church in Gothenburg, western Sweden. It is located on the Hisingen island, and it is part of the Tuve-Säve parish.

It is a Romanesque stone church, consisting of a rectangular nave and a narrow choir. This simple shape was typical of churches in Västergötland. The oldest parts of the building were probably erected in the 12th century. The two buttresses were added in the 18th century, and the porch in 1745. The sacristy, built in 1953, is the most recent addition.

The bell tower was erected south-west of the church in the 19th century; the bell dates back to 1770.

The church is surrounded by a small churchyard, the first mentions of which come from 1871. However, some of the tombstones are older than that, the oldest one from year 1660.
