= Björkekärr =

District in Gothenburg, Sweden

Coordinates: 57.71714°N 12.04720°E

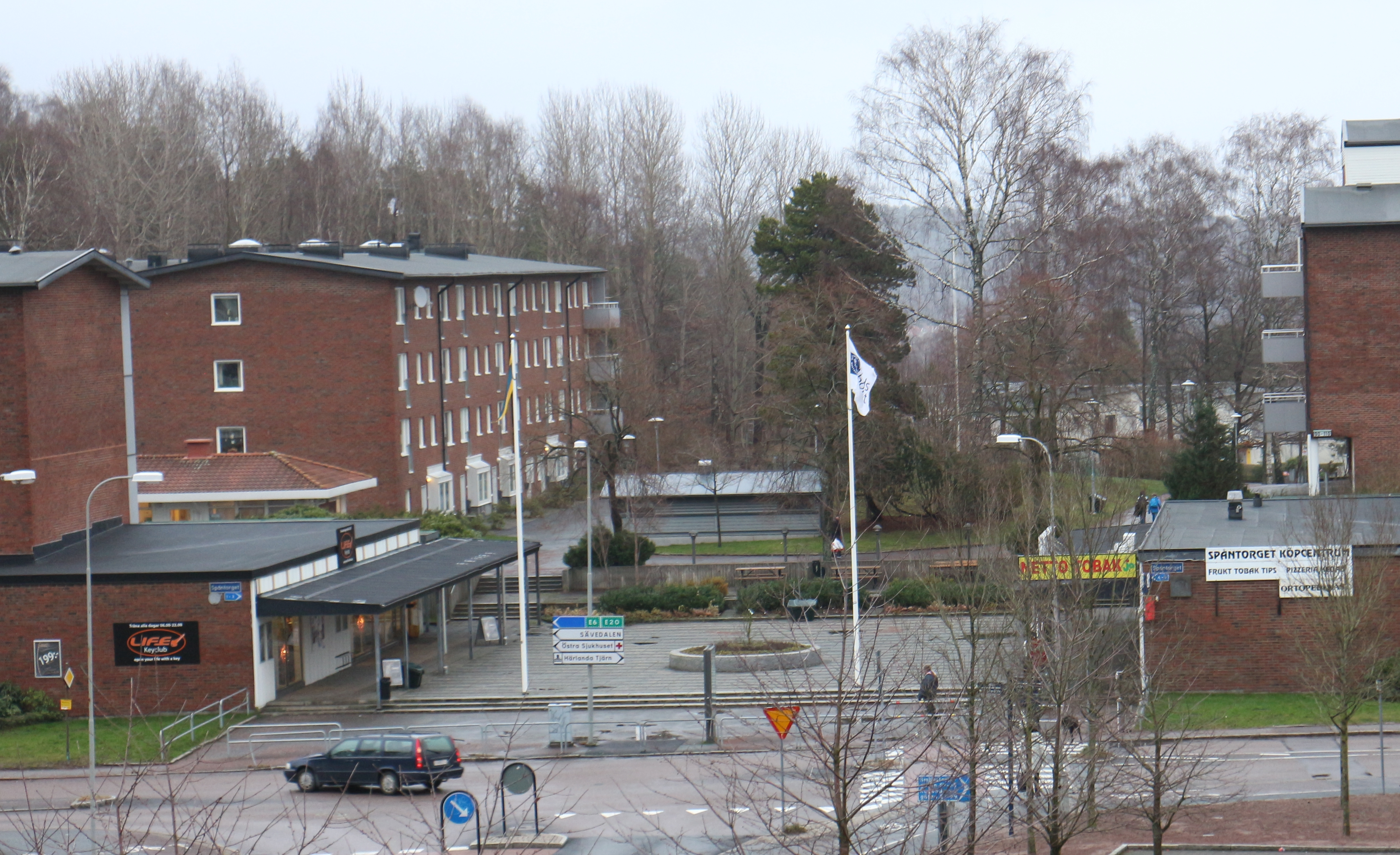
Street of Björkekärr

Björkekärr is an officially defined district in Gothenburg, Sweden which belongs to the Härlanda borough. Herbert (ship, 1905) classed as a historical ship by the Swedish National Maritime Museum, is situated 3 km southeast of Björkekärr. It had a population of 8,898 in 2021.
