= Delsjön =

Lakes in Gothenburg, Sweden

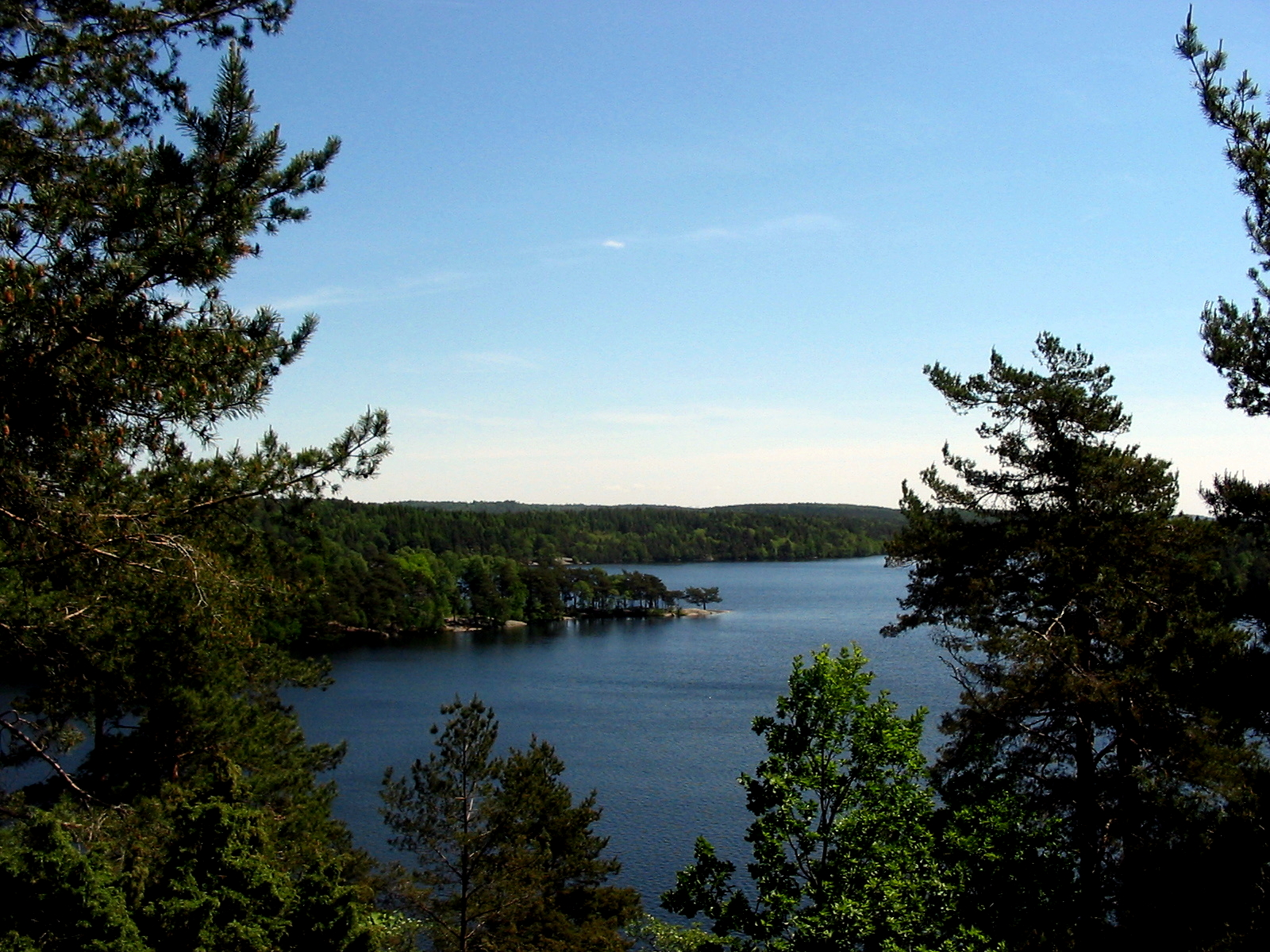

- Location within Sweden
- Location: Gothenburg
- Coordinates: 57°41′5″N 12°2′45″E
- Basin countries: Sweden
- Max. length: 3 km (1.9 mi)
- Max. width: 1.7 km (1.1 mi)
- Surface area: 2 km^{2} (0.77 sq mi)
- Water volume: 12.1×10^{6} m^{3} (9,800 acre⋅ft)
- Sections/sub-basins: Stora Delsjön, Lilla Delsjön

Delsjön consist of two coherent lakes, Stora Delsjön and Lilla Delsjön, located in eastern Gothenburg, in the Delsjöområdet nature reserve. They serve as a reservoir for the city, receiving water from the Göta River. At the shore of Stora Delsjön there is a popular beach.

== Gallery ==
Lilla Delsjön and Stora Delsjön

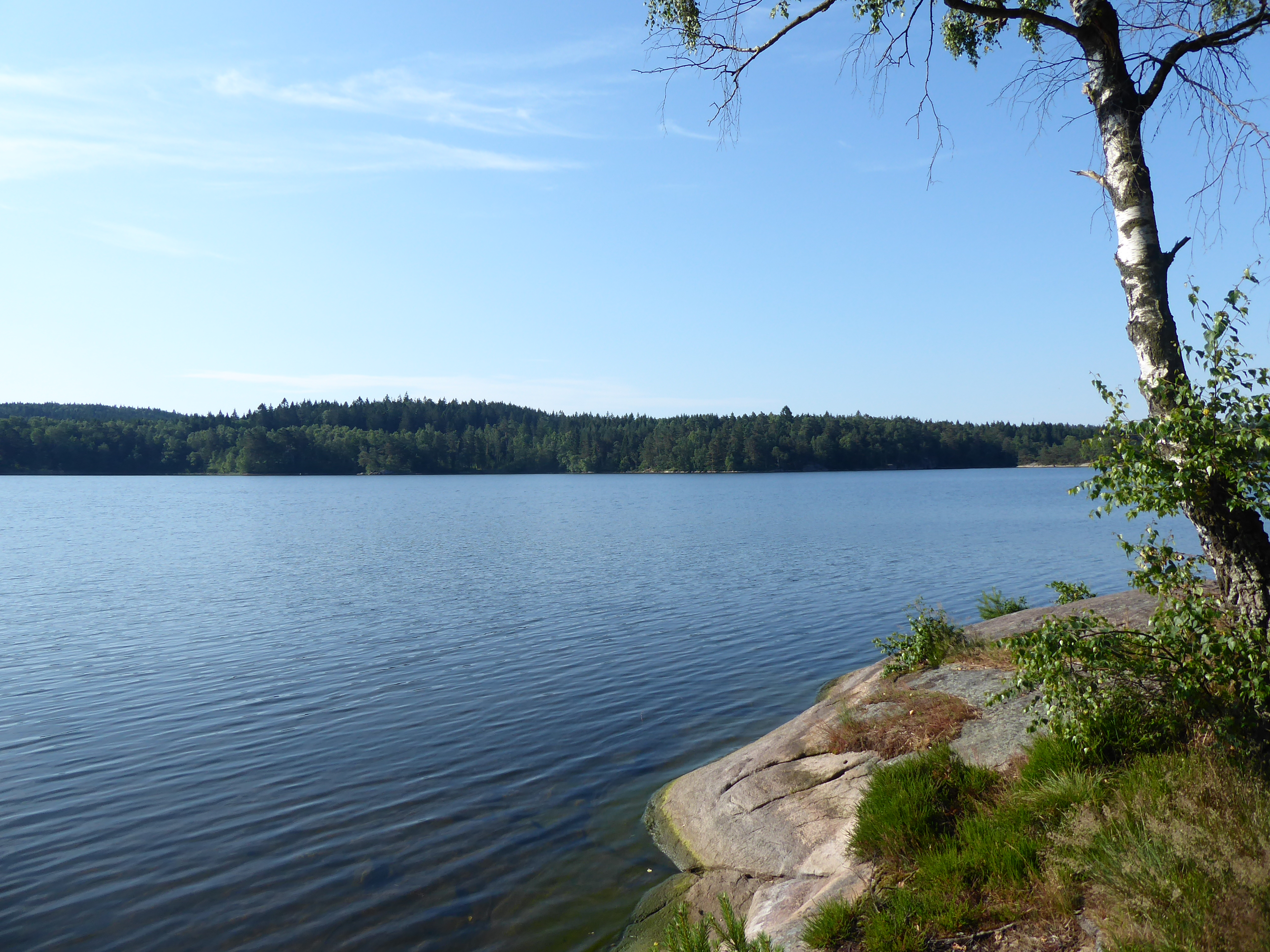
Lilla Delsjön from N shore, June 27, 2020.

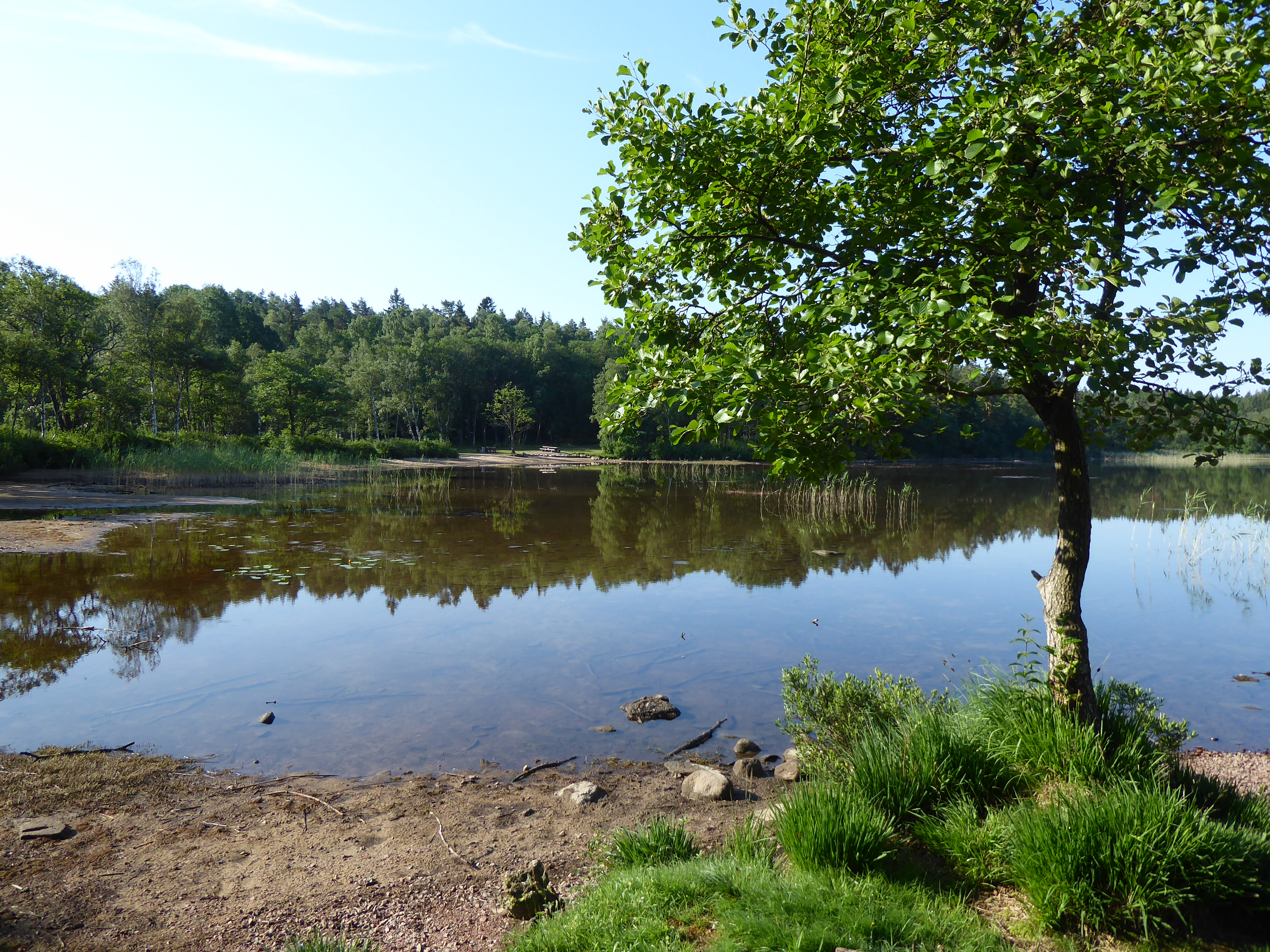
Lilla Delsjön, E shore, June 27, 2020.

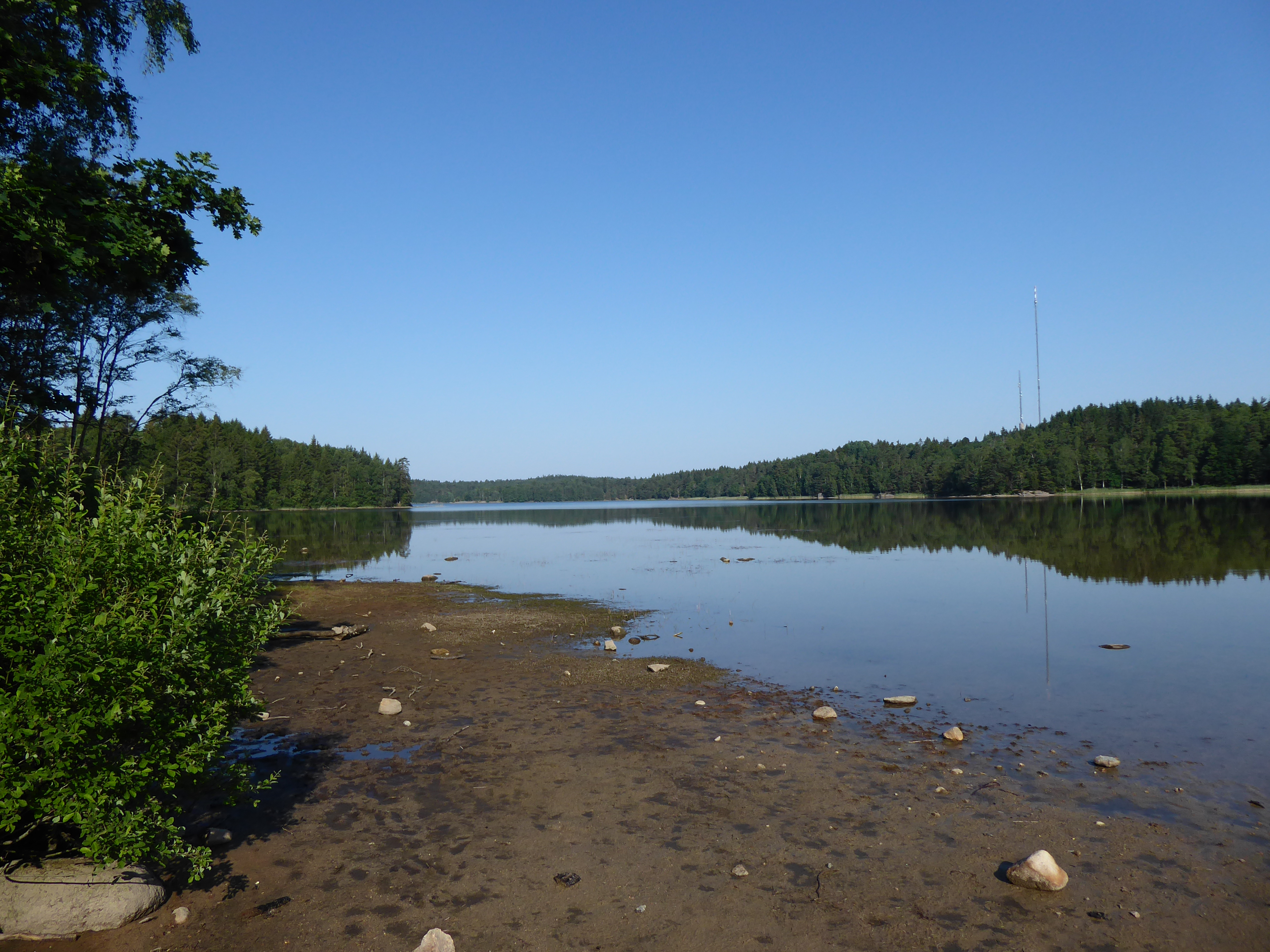
Lilla Delsjön from SE, June 27, 2020.

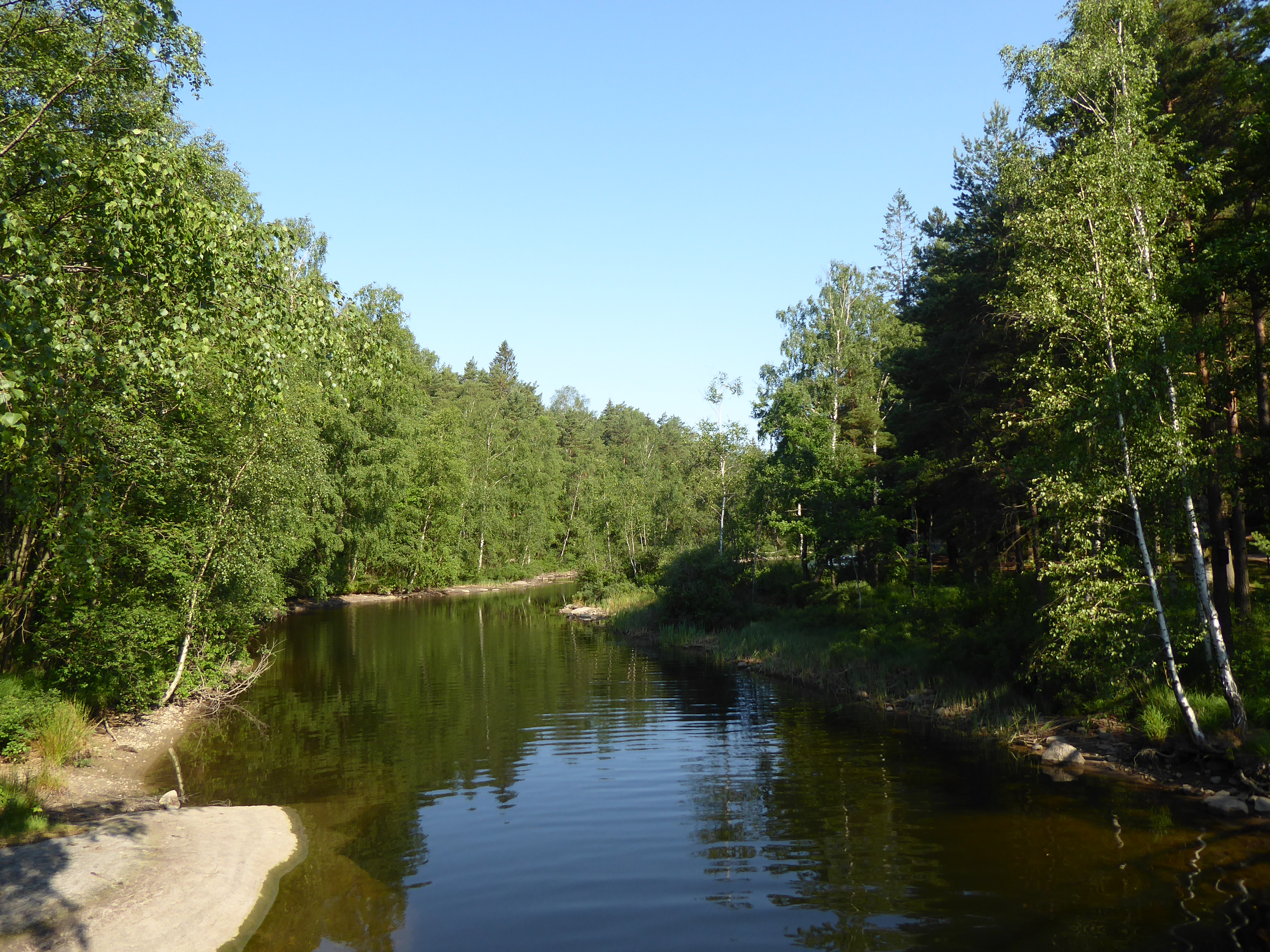
The connection between Lilla and Stora Delsjön, direction NW, June 27, 2020.

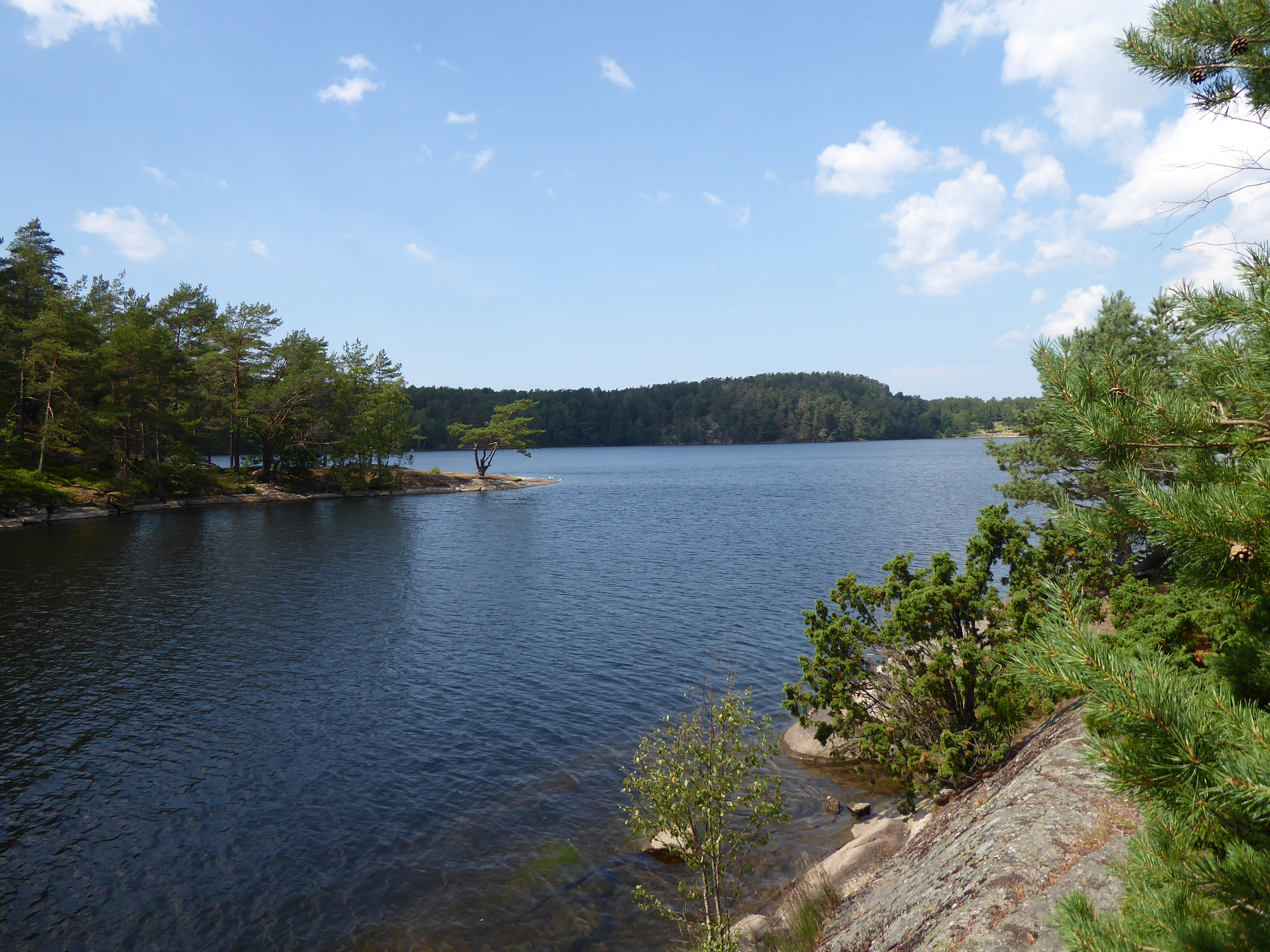
Stora Delsjön, strait between the small island Delhuvudet and Brattklevs udde, June 26, 2020.

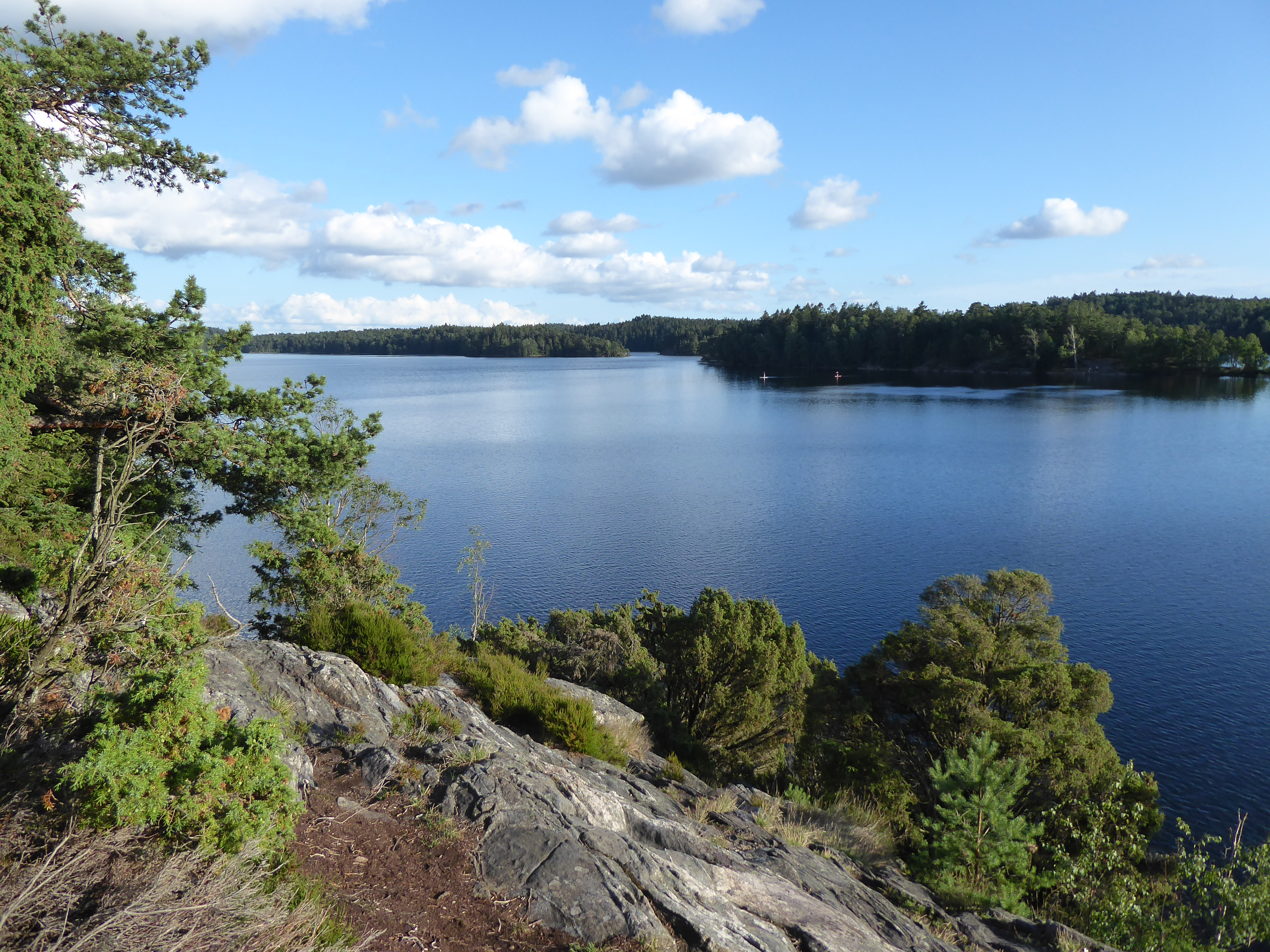
Stora Delsjön from the steep NW part, direction SE, July 9, 2020.

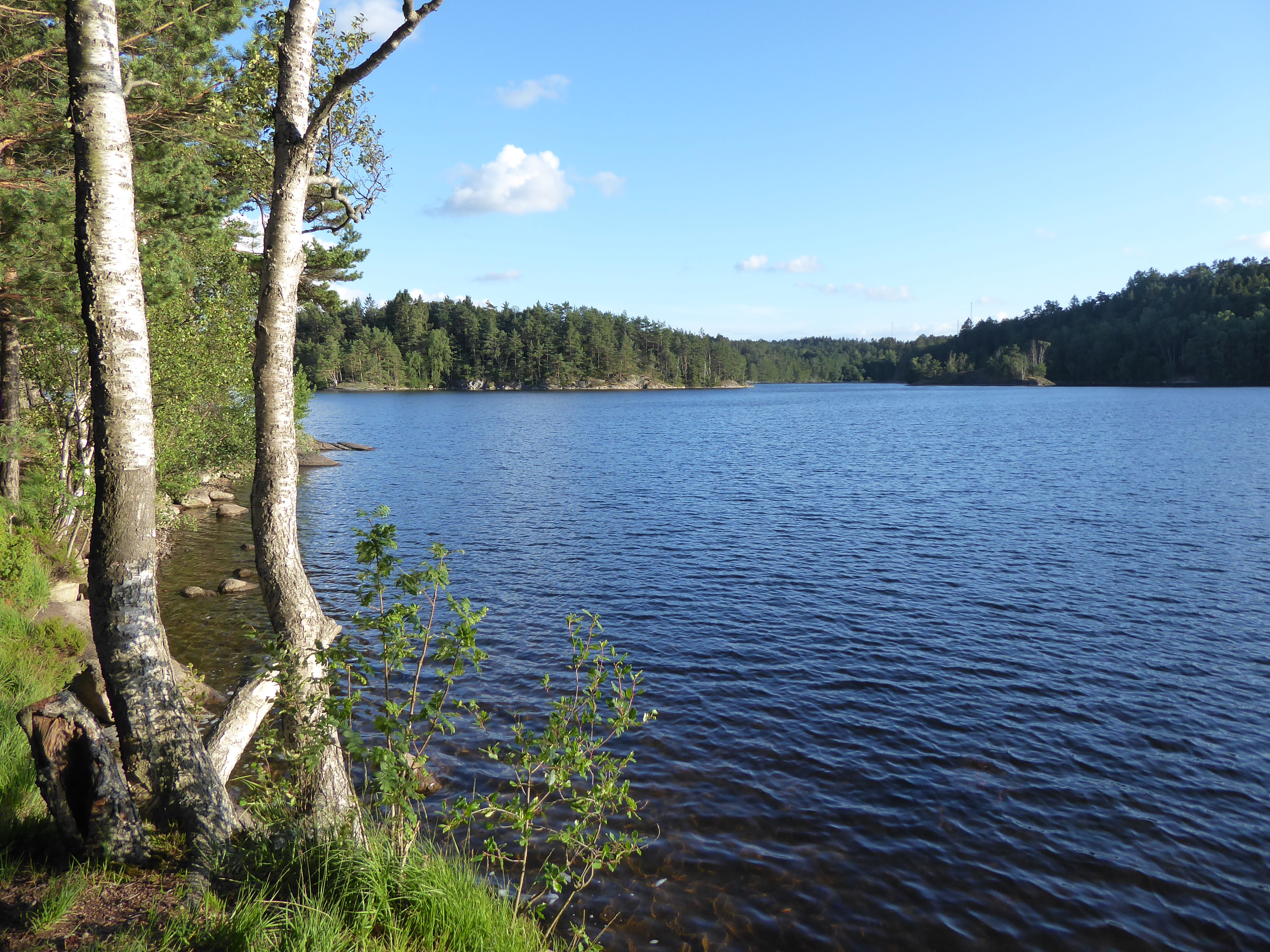
Stora Delsjön from the Stora Torps tånge promontory, direction S, July 9, 2020.

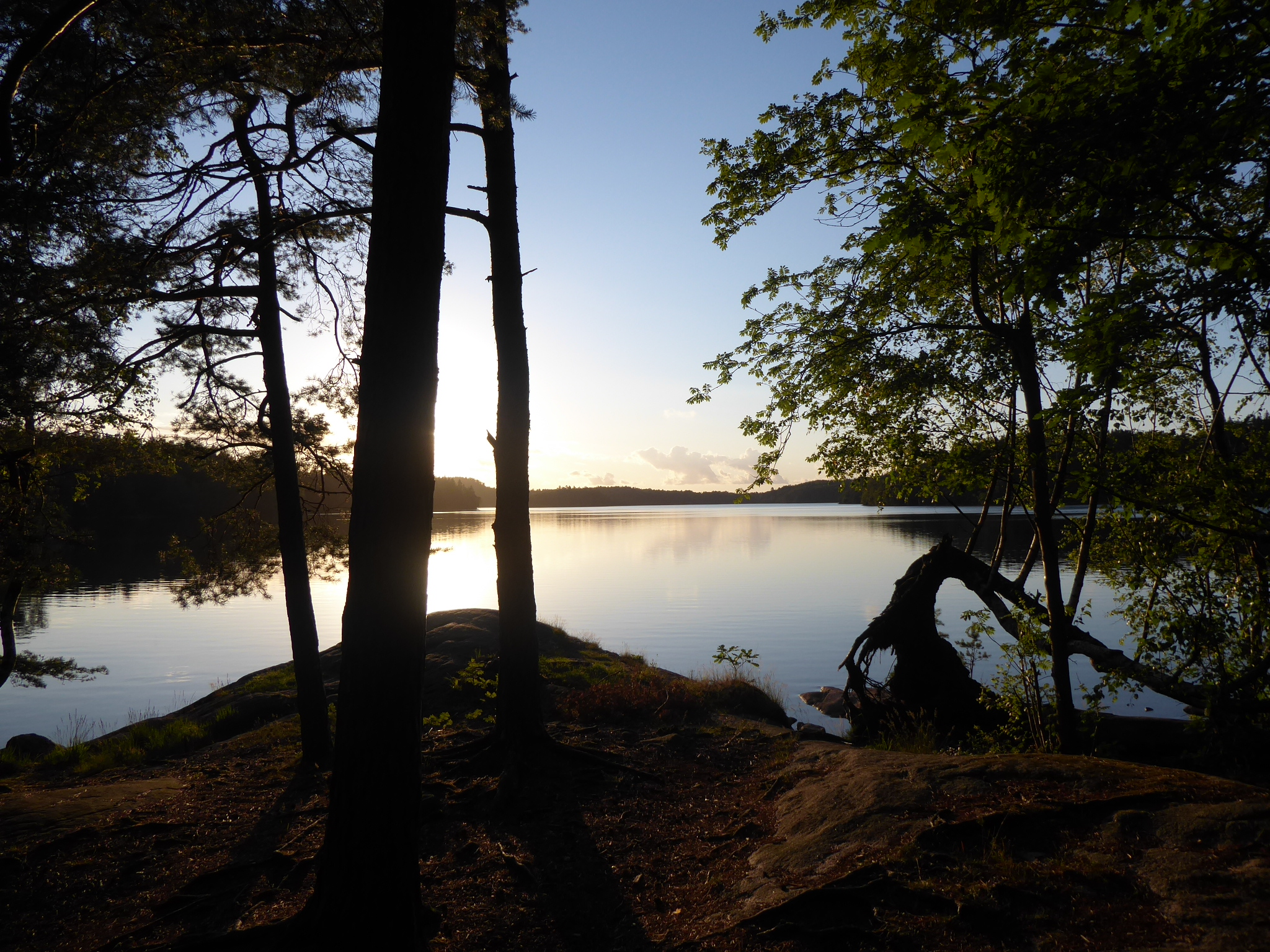
Sunset at Stora Delsjön, from SE, July 9, 2020.
