= Rannebergens IF =

Swedish football club

- Full name: Rannebergens Idrottsföreningen
- Nickname: RIF
- Founded: 1973; 52 years ago
- Ground: Gunnaredsplan; Angered; Sweden
- Chairman: Peter Bertlin
- League: Division 4 Göteborg A
Home colours	Away colours

Rannebergens IF is a Swedish football club located in Angered.

== Background ==
Rannebergens IF currently plays in Division 4 Göteborg A which is the sixth tier of Swedish football. They play their home matches at the Gunnaredsplan in Angered.

The club is affiliated to Göteborgs Fotbollförbund.

== Season to season ==
Season	Level	Division	Section	Position	Movements
1999	Tier 7	Division 6	Göteborg A	5th	
2000	Tier 7	Division 6	Göteborg A	6th	
2001	Tier 7	Division 6	Göteborg A	4th	
2002	Tier 7	Division 6	Göteborg A	2nd	
2003	Tier 7	Division 6	Göteborg A	1st	Promoted
2004	Tier 6	Division 5	Göteborg A	2nd	Promoted
2005	Tier 5	Division 4	Göteborg A	7th	
2006*	Tier 6	Division 4	Göteborg A	7th	
2007	Tier 6	Division 4	Göteborg A	9th	
2008	Tier 6	Division 4	Göteborg A	10th	
2009	Tier 6	Division 4	Göteborg A	9th	
2010	Tier 6	Division 4	Göteborg A	10th	
2011	Tier 6	Division 4	Göteborg A	12th	Relegated

* League restructuring in 2006 resulted in a new division being created at Tier 3 and subsequent divisions dropping a level.
