= Strömmensberg =

District in Gothenburg, Sweden

Coordinates: 57°43′14″N 12°1′2″E

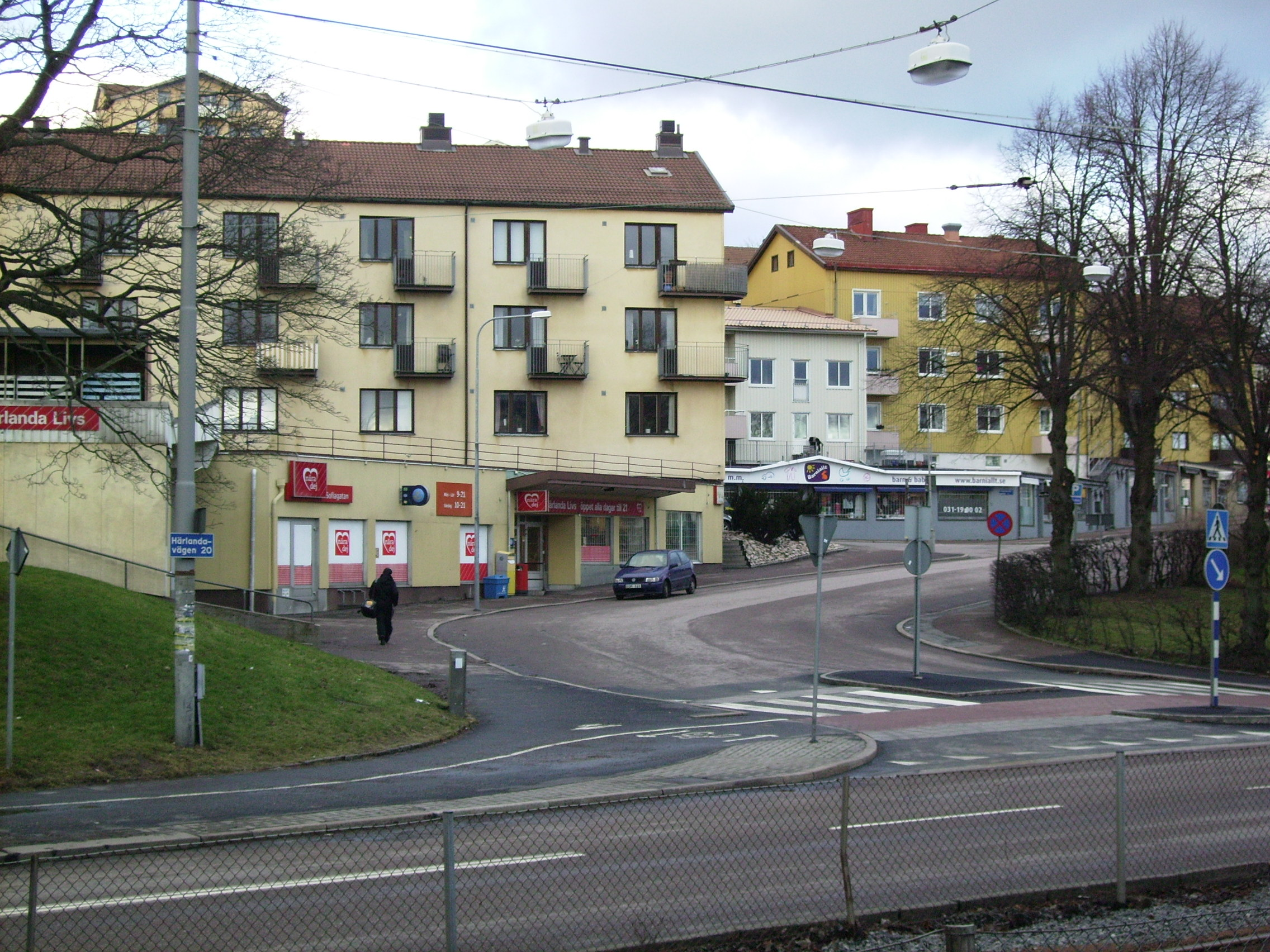
Sofiagatan at Strömmensberg, 2009.

Strömmensberg is a district in Gothenburg, Sweden, within Örgryte borough. It is a part of the officially defined residential district Bagaregården.
