= Tuve-Säve =

Parish of the Diocese of Gothenburg, Sweden

Coordinates: 57°45′58″N 11°55′59″E

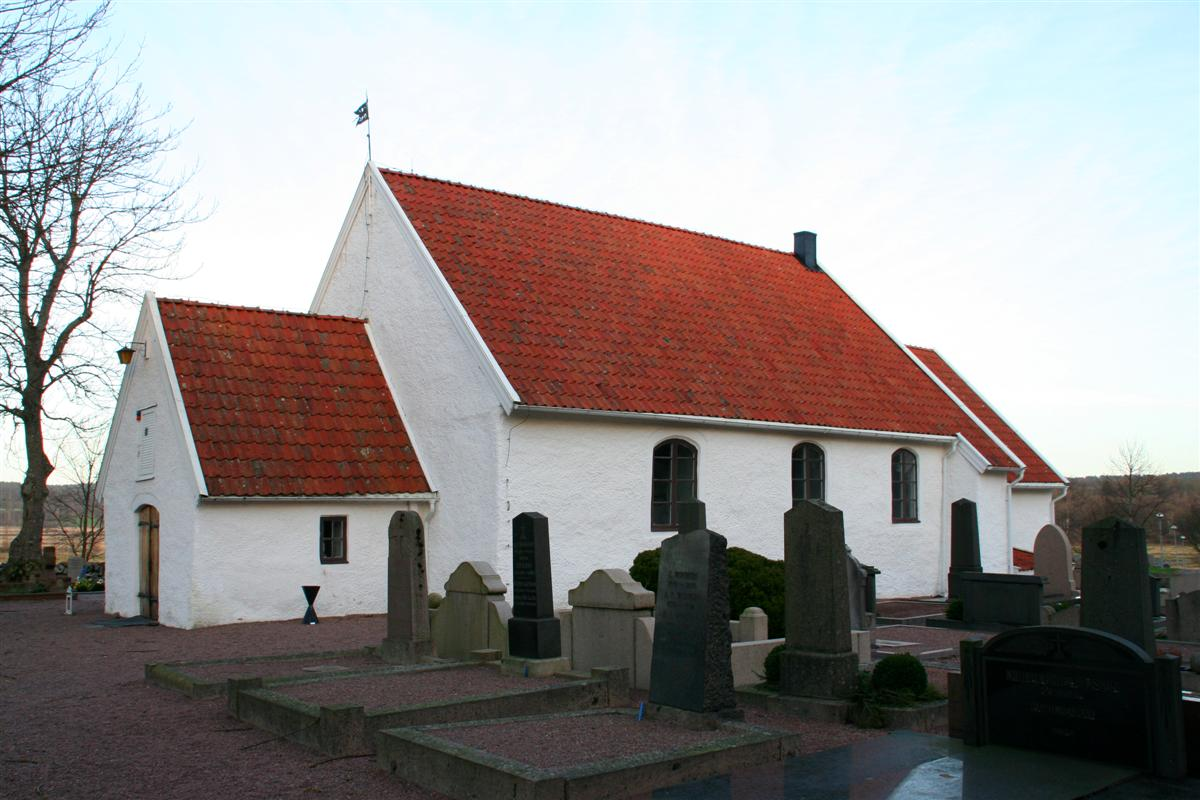
Church in the Tuve-Säve parish

Tuve-Säve is a parish of the Diocese of Gothenburg, in Gothenburg, Sweden. It was formed in 2010 by the merger of the Tuve and Säve parishes. Since 2018 it has been in a common pastorate with the parish of Backa. Tuve Church is part of the parish.
