= Kortedala =

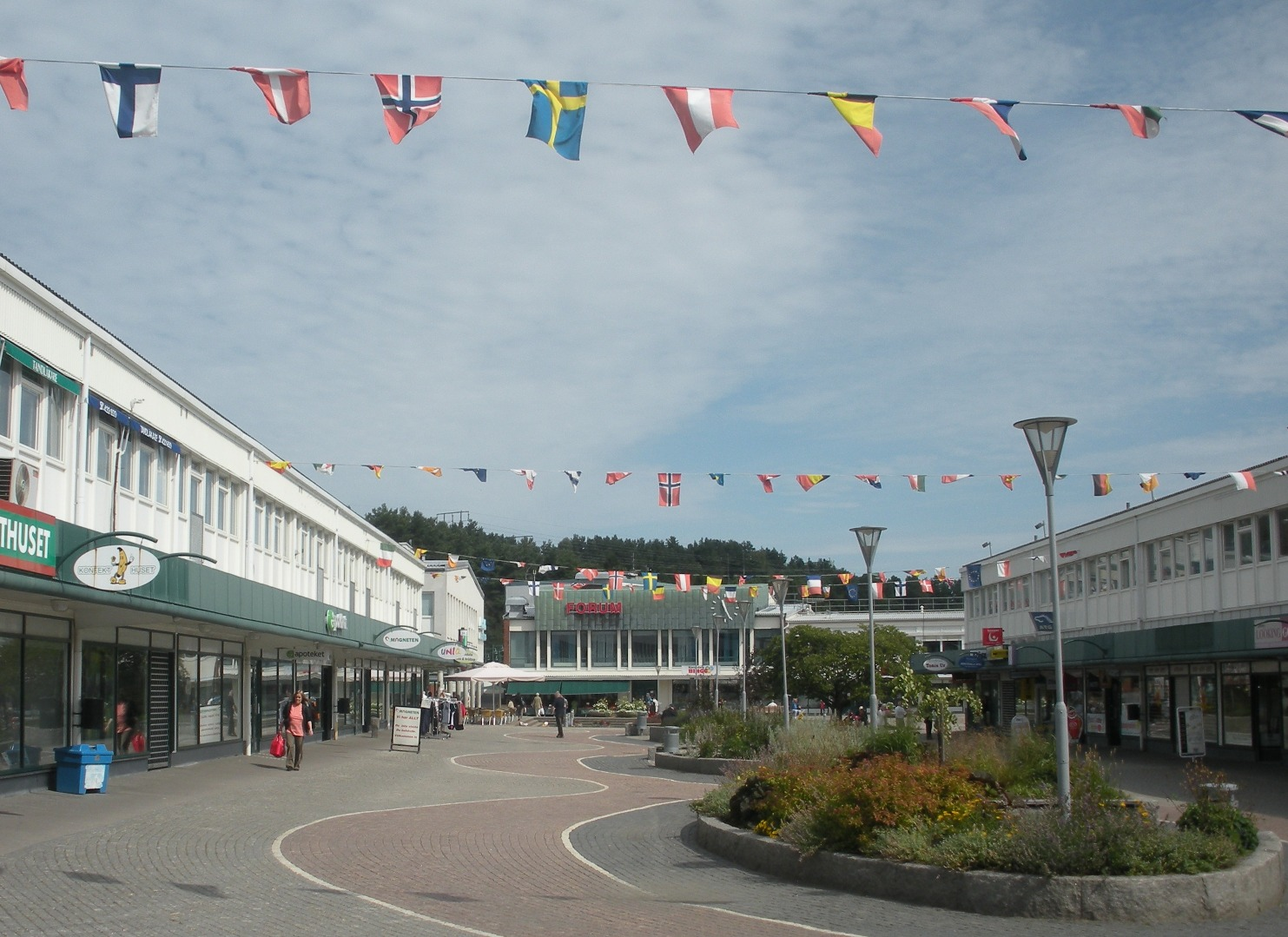
- Kortedala Square, the largest square in the district, July 2011
- Interactive map of Kortedala
- Coordinates: 57°44′59.15″N 12°01′52.82″E
- Country: Sweden
- Municipality: Gothenburg Municipality
- City: Gothenburg
- City district area: North-East Gothenburg

Area
  - Total: 387 ha (960 acres)

Population (2015)
  - Total: 16,507
- Primary statistical areas Norra Kortedala + Södra Kortedala

Kortedala is a district in Gothenburg, Sweden. The district is divided into the primary statistical areas Norra Kortedala (Northern Kortedala) and Södra Kortedala (Southern Kortedala), which form part of the administrative city district area of North-East Gothenburg.

Kortedala was Gothenburg's first suburb, developed during the 1950s on previously undeveloped land in the northeastern outskirts of the city, covering 238 hectares where previously only croft-like buildings had existed. Its present area is 387 hectares. Some farmsteads in the southern parts remained until the early 1960s. Kortedala celebrated its 50th anniversary in 2003.

The building structure shows considerable variation, ranging from one to thirteen storeys in different housing types. There are many tower blocks located in steep terrain, as well as lower slab blocks, a few large high-rise buildings, detached houses and atrium houses. Two- and three-room apartments dominate (or three-room apartments built on the footprint of two-room units). Today the district has mixed development but consists mainly of multi-family housing.

Kortedala is served by the Gothenburg tramway.

The Church of Sweden is represented through Kortedala Parish, whose parish church is All Saints’ Church. There is also Kortedalakyrkan, affiliated with the Equmenia Church, and Holy Stefan Dečanski Church, which belongs to the Serbian Orthodox Church but was formerly part of the Church of Sweden under the name Vårfrukyrkan. The International Baptist Church of Gothenburg meets at Forum near Kortedala Square. Jehovah’s Witnesses have a Kingdom Hall (meeting place) on Västra Midvintersgatan 2.

The district also contains a fire station and a water tower.

== Name and street names ==
The name Kortedala derives from the croft located just south of the intersection of Runstavsgatan and Minutgatan, first mentioned in 1827 as Korta dahlen. From 1840 the spelling became standardised. The meaning is considered to be “the short valley”, in contrast to the nearby Djupedalen (“the deep valley”). The first element of the name was previously pronounced kote-, also kota-, kotta- and kåtte.

Most streets in Kortedala are named after terms relating to the measurement of time, for example Tideräkningsgatan (“Chronology Street”), Kalendervägen (“Calendar Road”) and Halvsekelsgatan (“Half-Century Street”). The district has four local squares, which from north to south are Årstidstorget, Citytorget, Kortedala torg and Kalendertorget.

== History ==
=== 18th century ===
An incorrect version of the first inhabitants of Kortedala appears in many historical accounts: the first known building was said to have been a single-storey cottage with greystone walls built in 1791 by the farm worker Lars Larsson from Kvibergsnäs landeri. He had purchased the land for 300 riksdaler banco on condition that he remained employed at Kvibergsnäs. The cottage, later known as “Kortedala No. 1”, was reportedly built where the tramway today enters the tunnel north of the Kviberg housing area after the Nymånegatan stop.

This version of the first inhabitant must be regarded as correct: the first documented resident in tax registers was the labourer Måns Bengtsson (1767–1842), who moved to Kortedala from Lundby Parish on 31 January 1812. His wife was Elin Andersdotter. They may therefore be regarded as the first known residents of Kortedala in modern times. Local historian Gunnel Mattson demonstrated in an article in Göteborgs-Posten Nordost on 28 April 1994 (“Was Lars Larsson first in Kortedala?”) that Lars Larsson was born in 1791 and never lived in Kortedala, and that the Kvibergsnäs estate did not extend into the Kortedala area.

=== Croft settlement ===
Until 1954 around ten small crofts were located among the hills, usually named after numbers or owners. Examples include Kortedala 1, 2 and 3 east of Runstavsgatan; numbers 4, 5 and 6 west of Timgatan; Pettersberg 26 west of Gregorianska gatan; Ramsdalen 1 southeast of the intersection between Almanacksvägen and Tideräkningsgatan; Ramsdalen 5 and 6 on Kvartssekelgatan; and Ramsdalen 7 and 8 west of Dagjämningsgatan. These crofts could normally not support a family on their own, but combined with poultry keeping, livestock, potato plots and fruit trees they provided a modest livelihood.

=== Development in the 1950s ===
A development plan for a new model district in Kortedala was presented in 1950, and in October that year the firm Kjessler & Mannerstråle was commissioned to prepare a detailed plan proposal. Seven architectural firms were later contracted to design the district. The land was owned by the City of Gothenburg but parts were leased to private individuals and to the state. This was the first time in Gothenburg's building history that an entire district was constructed without direct connection to existing urban development.

Eight neighbourhood units were created in Kortedala, and approximately 6,000 apartments were originally planned. In the final city plan the development density was increased by 14 per cent compared with the initial plan, owner-occupied housing was reduced from 7 to 5 per cent of the total housing stock, and high-rise housing increased from 15 to 25 per cent. Most residential buildings constructed between 1952 and 1957 consisted of three- to four-storey slab blocks and eight- to nine-storey tower blocks. The most common apartment type was two rooms and kitchen, and apartments with four or more rooms were very few. After further expansion in the late 1950s and during the 1960s, Kortedala consisted of just under 8,300 apartments in multi-family buildings and around 300 small houses.

Construction of the district took place between 1952 and 1957. The area had previously been mountainous terrain incorporated from Angered in 1930. Around 8,000 apartments were built during this period. The first residents moved into the new apartment buildings on Månadsgatan and Kalendervägen on 7 November 1953.

Kortedala has often been compared with Vällingby in Stockholm. At the time of their construction these districts were not referred to as suburbs but as satellite towns, reflecting contemporary urban planning ideas. Delegations from around the world visited Kortedala during its development, as it demonstrated that good housing with bathrooms, fully equipped kitchens and parquet-floored living rooms could be provided for ordinary people. Even fifty years after its construction, the district has largely retained its architectural character, although the population has changed from predominantly Swedish child-raising families, whose children often attended local schools such as Gärdsåsskolan, Hundraårsskolan, Lövåsskolan, Utmarksskolan and Kortedalatorgsskolan, to a period with many elderly residents and later again to a district with many families of immigrant background.

Due to the relatively small apartment sizes, typically 50–60 square metres, the population declined from a peak of around 28,000 residents in the mid-1960s to under 15,000 in the early 2000s. The original city plan had envisaged approximately 21,000 residents.

== Buildings and areas ==
- All Saints’ Church, completed to designs by architect Olov Geggen.
- The atrium houses on Aprilgatan, completed in 1956 and designed by Erik and Tore Ahlsén.
- Cinema Forum at Kortedala Square, inaugurated on 10 October 1959 and closed on 30 December 1965.
- Citytorget, built 1955–57 after designs by architect G. Andersson.
- Gregorianska gatan, three-storey slab blocks designed by Jan Wallinder and Sven Brolid.
- Holy Stefan Dečanski Church, built in 1972 as Vårfrukyrkan and designed by architect Johan Tuvert.
- Julianska gatan, triangular tower blocks of 11–12 storeys designed by Jan Wallinder and Sven Brolid, forming distinctive landmarks on Gothenburg's northeastern skyline.
- Kalendervägen, seven nine-storey buildings designed by architect Nils Einar Eriksson.
- Kortedala torg, built between 1955 and 1960.
- Gärdsåsskolan, completed in 1959 and designed by Nils Einar Eriksson.
- Kortedala Water Tower, designed by Nils Einar Eriksson and completed in 1955.
- Kvartsekelsgatan tower blocks designed by Erik Ragndal.
- The collective housing project Trädet, completed in 1956.
- Lövåsskolan, built 1955–57.
- Sekelhuset, constructed in 1987–88 as a combined day-service centre.

== Schools ==
Schools in the district include Talldungeskolan, Utmarksskolan (grades 6–9), Assaredsskolan, Gärdsåsskolan and Ramsdalsskolan.

Assaredsskolan is a comprehensive school covering grades 1–9 and follows educational principles inspired by the Monroe model originating in Brooklyn, United States.

== Sports clubs ==
- Kortedala IF (football)
- AK 77 Göteborg (wrestling)
- Majornas IK (youth football)
- Runa IK (youth handball)

== Notable people ==
- Helena Bergström – actress
- Micael Bindefeld – event organiser
- Kajsa Ernst – actress
- Göran Johansson – municipal politician
- Ingemar Johansson – boxer
- Jens Karlsson – ice hockey player
- Sebastian Karlsson – ice hockey player
- Kent Larsson – artist
- Jens Lekman – pop musician
- Jonas Ljung – magician and stand-up comedian
- Ljubomir Vranjes – handball player

== Kortedala Museum ==
Kortedala Museum is housed in an apartment at Adventsvägen 1. The apartment retains its original interior and displays furniture and details from the 1950s and 1960s.
