= Gustaf Lindgren =

Swedish architect

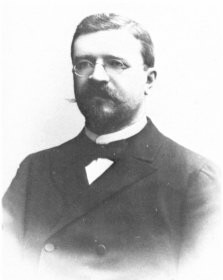
- Gustaf Lindgren, circa 1890
- Born: 4 November 1863; Stockholm, Sweden
- Died: 22 August 1930 (aged 66)
- Education: Royal Institute of Technology, Royal Swedish Academy of Arts
- Occupation: architect
- Years active: 1887–1924
- Known for: public buildings, houses

Gustaf Axel Herman Lindgren (4 November 1863 – 22 August 1930) was a Swedish architect.

== Biography ==
Lindgren was born in Stockholm, Sweden. He studied at the Royal Institute of Technology 1881–1885 and at the Royal Swedish Academy of Arts 1885–1887 and went on a study trip to Germany, Italy and France 1888–1890. He was hired in 1887 by the agency administrating governmental buildings (Överintendentsämbetet), held the position of superintendent (hovintendent) from 1899. From 1905, he was teacher in the subject of history of building art at the KTH Royal Institute of Technology. He was married to Anna Birch and was the father to architect Gustaf Birch-Lindgren (1892–1969).

The list below shows some of his most public works, but he also made villas in Djursholm, Saltsjöbaden, Sala and Gävle. He was also an author and contributed to the second edition of the Swedish encyclopedia Nordisk familjebok.

== Some houses he created ==
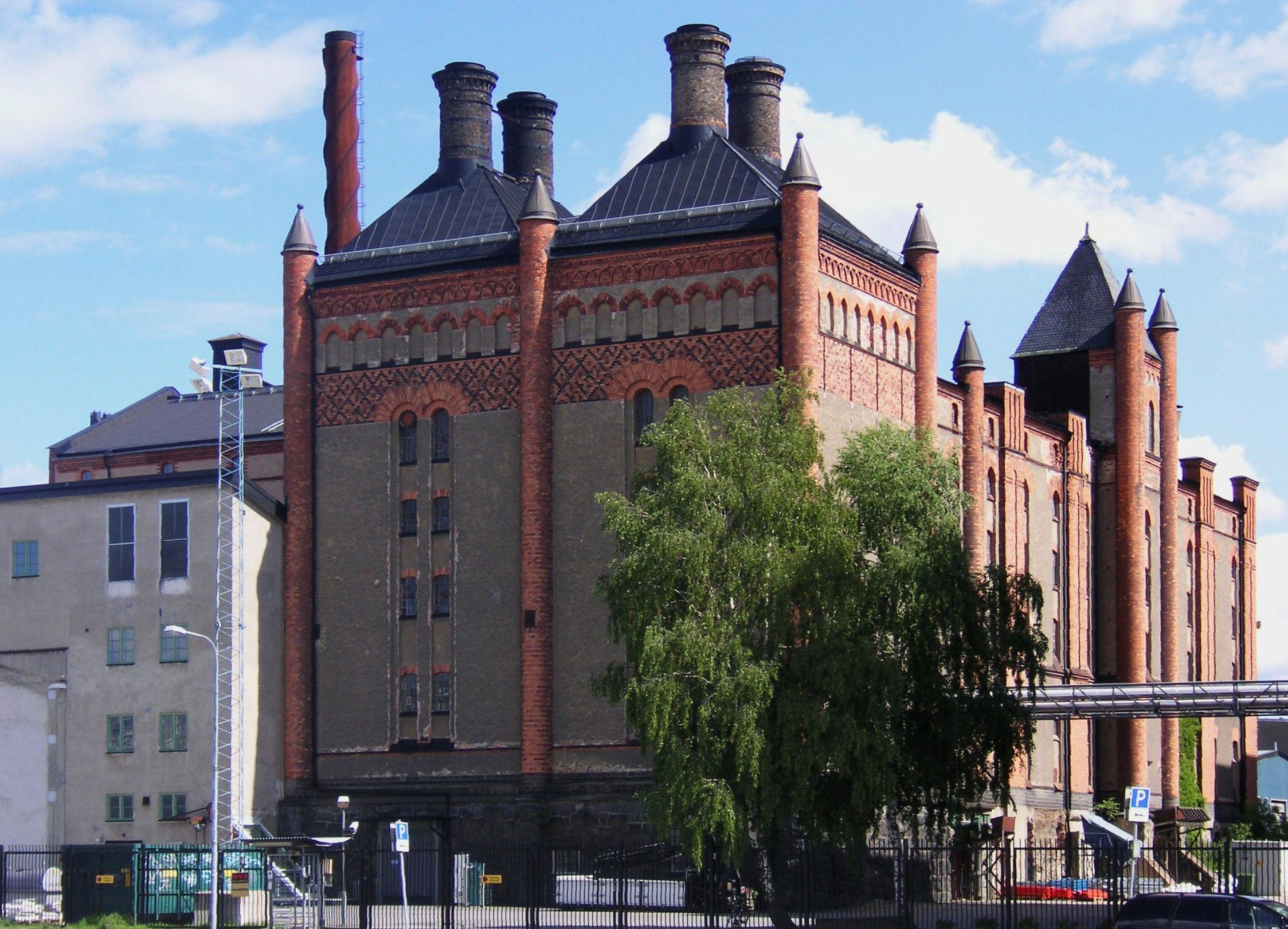
Stora Bryggeriet i Stockholm

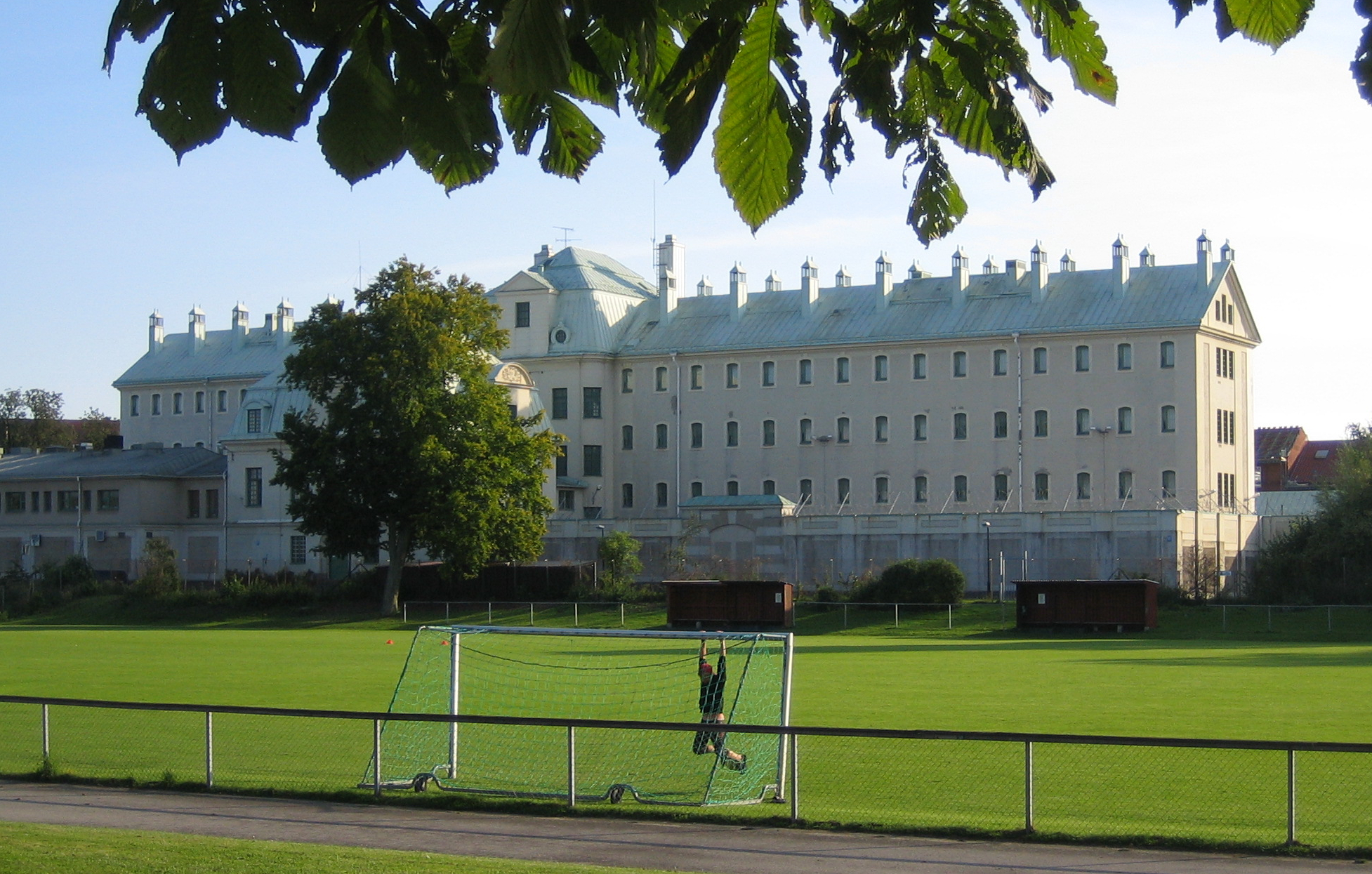
Anstalten Malmö Kirseberg

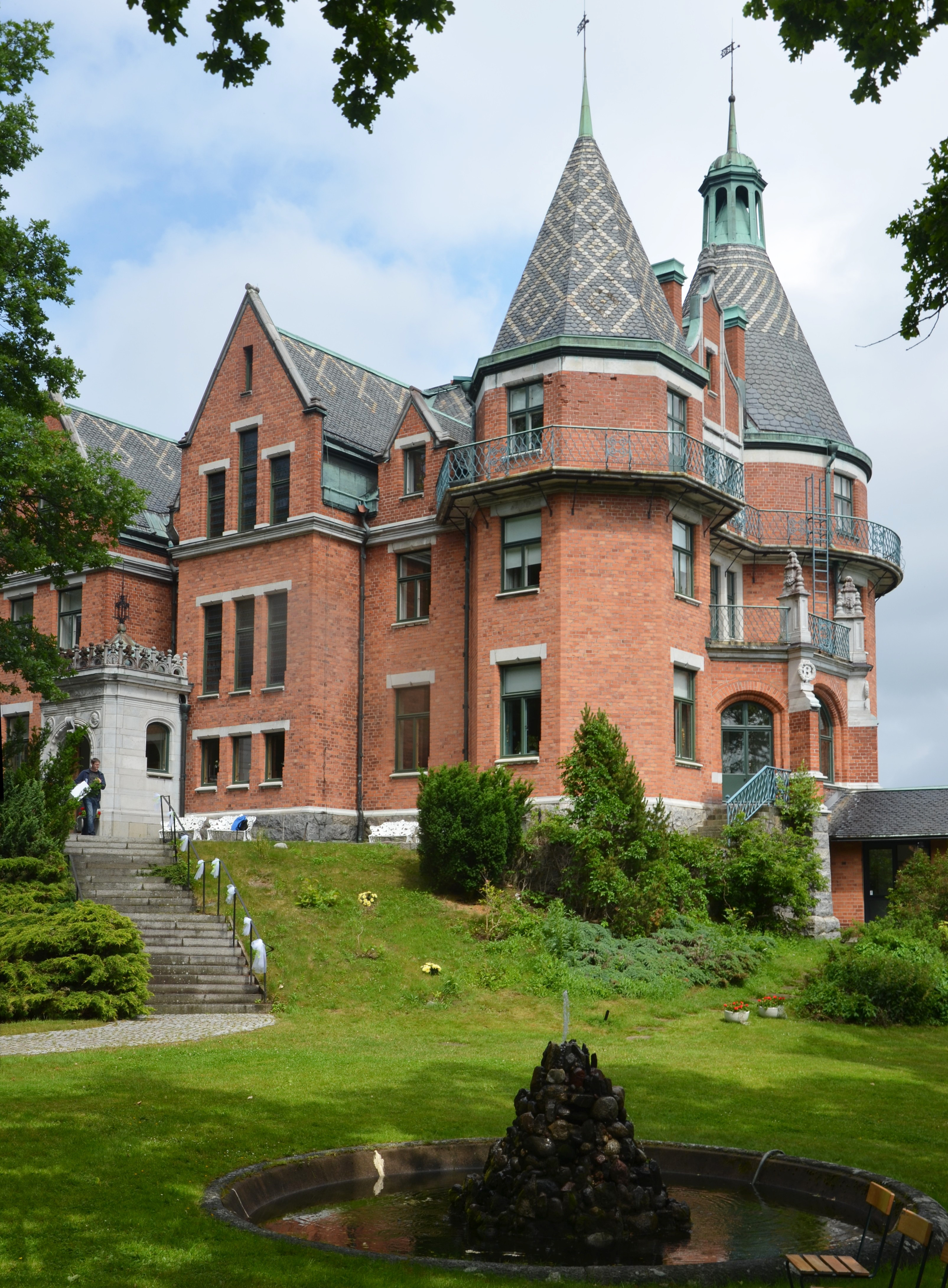
Villa Skärtofta i Saltsjöbaden, 1895–97

- Whitlockska huset, Stockholm (1887)
- Stora Bryggeriet at Kungsholmen in Stockholm (1890)
- Tabernaklet, Stockholm (1890)
- Herrgården Blackeberg in Blackeberg (1893)
- Ahlbomska huset in Motala (later Motala rådhus, 1896)
- Strandvägen 11, Stockholm (1896)
- Arsenalsgatan 16, Stockholm (1896)
- Narvavägen 12, Stockholm (1896)
- Östermalmsfängelset (1897)
- Tattersall, now known as IVA-house, Grev Turegatan 12–16, Stockholm (1898)
- Västgöta nation's building in Uppsala (redesign, 1900)
- Stockholm police house at Kungsholmen (1903–11)
- The crematorium at Norra begravningsplatsen, Stockholm (1906–1908)
- The county residence in Karlskrona (1908–10)
- Härlandafängelset in Gothenburg (1913)
- Långholmen prison (redesign, 1913–1923)
- Direktörsvillan (Långholmen) (1914)
- Malmö prison Kirseberg (1914)
- Riddarholmskyrkan (restaurering, 1914–1922)
- Nationalmuseum (redesign according to plan by Bergh, 1914–1923)
- Sjoutnäsets kapell in northern Jämtland (1916)
- The crematorium in Örebro (1921)
- Frimurarelogen, Karlstad (redesign, 1921–1923)
- The columbarium in Gustaf Vasa kyrka, Stockholm (1924)

== Other Sources ==
- Arkitekturmuseum - Arkitektregistret
