= Kålltorp =

Urban district in Gothenburg, Sweden

Coordinates: 57.714°N 12.030°E

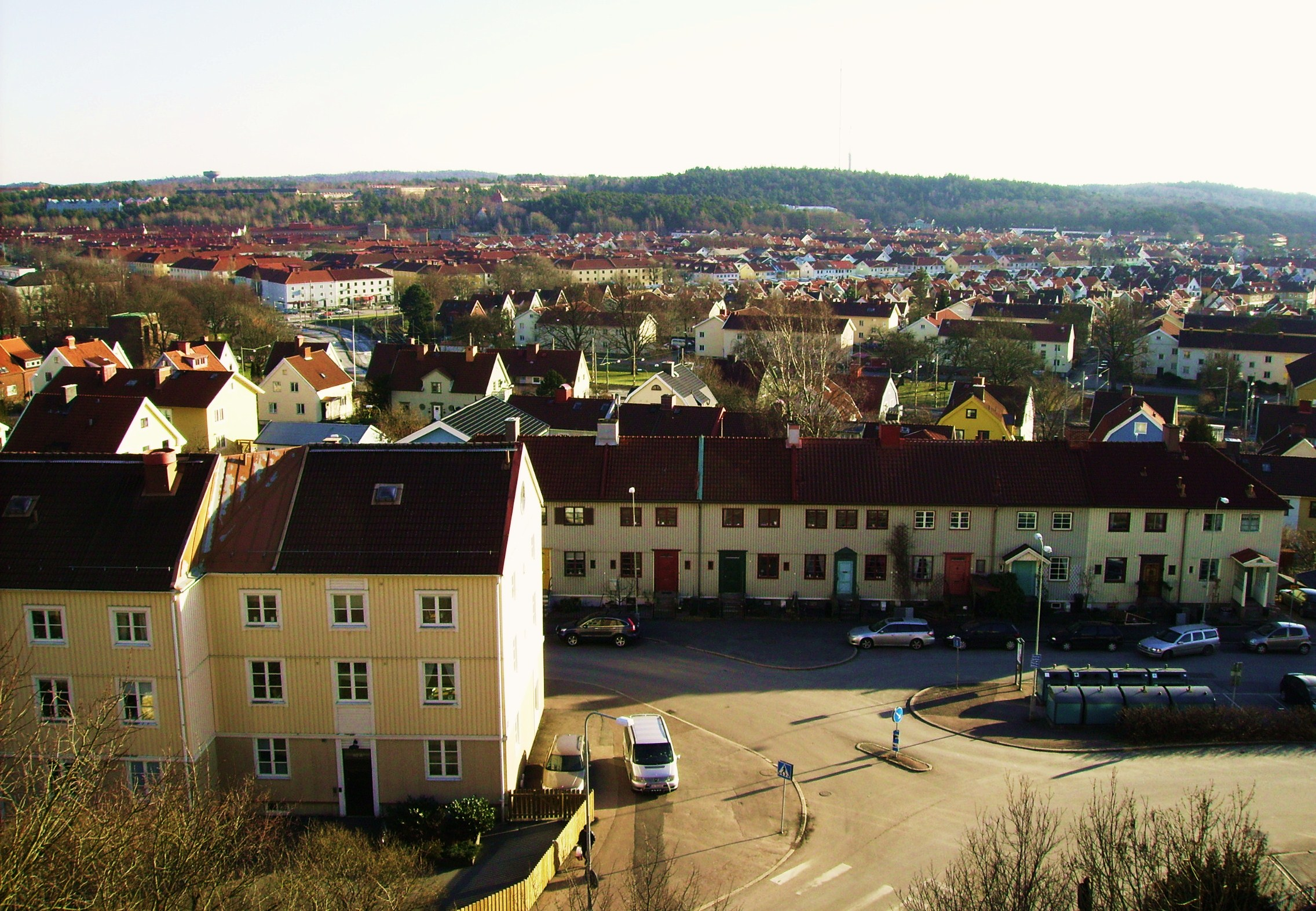
Kålltorp, Göteborg

Kålltorp is a district in Härlanda, Gothenburg, Sweden.
