= Torpa (district) =

District of Gothenburg, Sweden

Coordinates: 57°43′23″N 12°2′10″E

Torpa is an officially defined district in Gothenburg, Sweden, which belongs to Härlanda. It consists of the traditional districts Torpa and Fräntorp. The district consists mostly of apartment blocks built in the 1940s designed by architect Nils Einar Eriksson. It had a population of 3,952 in 2021.
