= Angered =

Urban area in Gothenburg, Sweden

Coordinates: 57°48′N 12°02′E

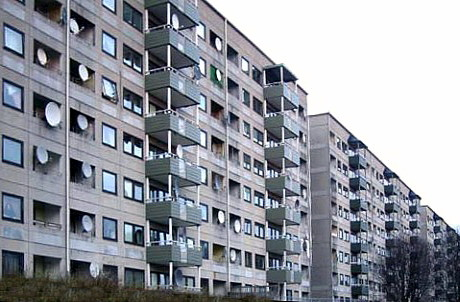
Housing block in Angered

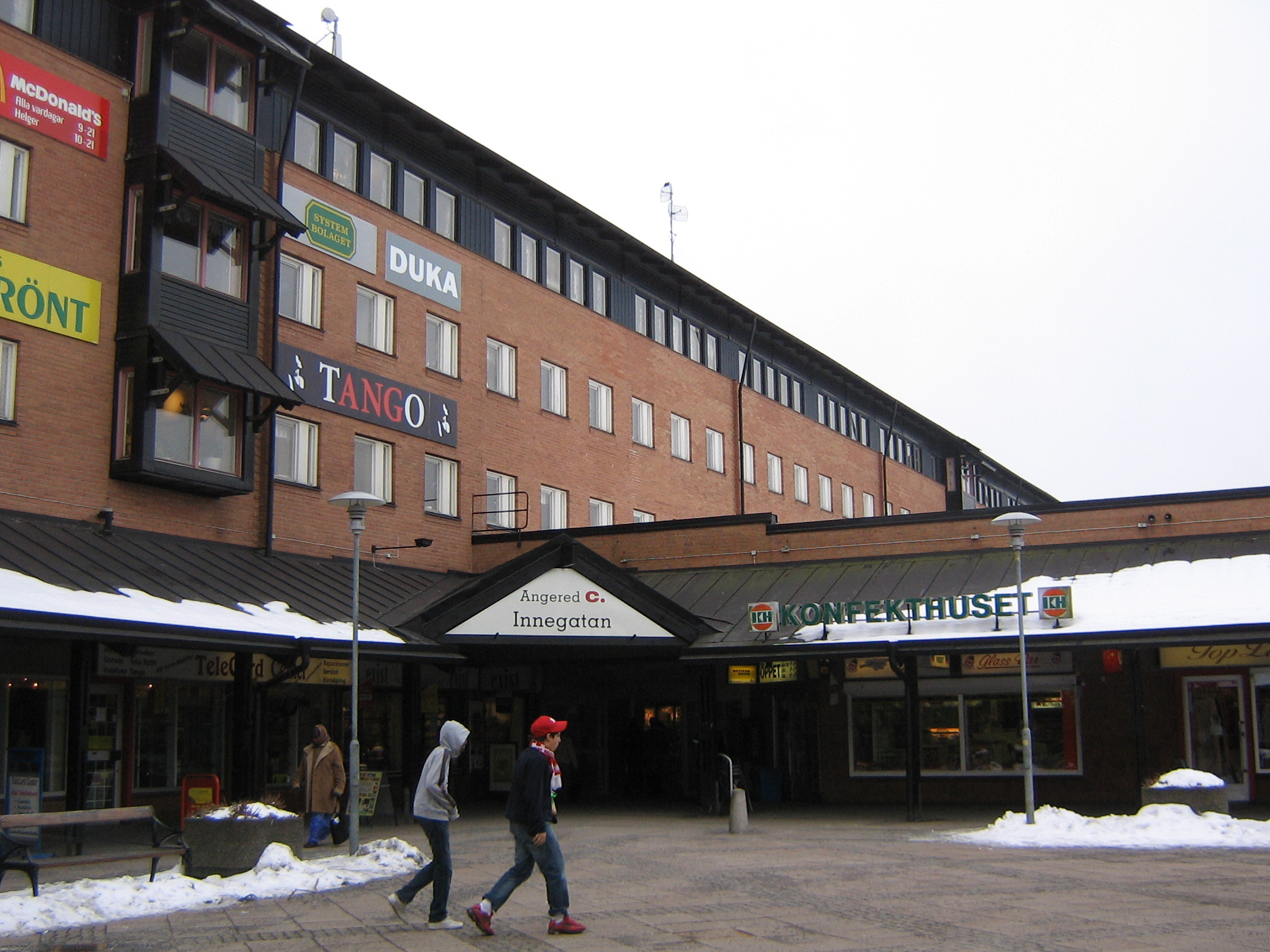
Angereds Centrum is the shopping center of Angered

Angered (Swedish: [ˈâŋːɛˌreːd]) is a borough of Gothenburg Municipality in Västra Götaland County, Sweden. Angered is the biggest Million Programme area in Gothenburg, and one of the biggest in the country, with 60,000 inhabitants.

== Transportation ==
Angered is served by bus lines 40 and 71-77 and a number of tram lines. The tram service terminates here, with the turning slope running around the bus terminal. The tram lines serving Angered are 4, 8 and 9 (towards Mölndal, Frölunda and Kungssten). Initially, the tram line was due to run past Angered Centrum, terminating at Rannebergen, not far from the centre. This project was abandoned while under construction, and bus line 76 runs from Angered Centrum to Rannebergen instead. However, there is space for trams inside the hill, just as at Hammarkullen. The next station southwards is Storås.

== Sports ==
The following sports clubs are located in Angered:

- Göteborg HC (GHC) of the Swedish Women's Hockey League (SDHL; premier women's ice hockey league in Sweden)
- Gunnilse IS of Division 3 (fifth-tier men's football league)
- Lärje-Angereds IF of Division 2 (fourth-tier men's football league)
- Rannebergens IF of Division 4 (sixth-tier men's football league)

== Notable residents ==
- Dead by April, metal band
- Jens Lekman, indie singer-songwriter
- Christian Olsson, triple-jumper, former European no. 1, born in northern Angered
- Laleh Pourkarim, pop singer and actress, grew up in Angered
- Jón Gnarr, former mayor of Reykjavík and notably has served as a Member of the Althing for the Reykjavik Constituency, representing the Liberal reform Party.
