= Stockholm County (Riksdag constituency) =

Constituency of the Riksdag, the national legislature of Sweden

- Stockholms Län
- Constituency for the Riksdag
- Location of Stockholm County within Sweden
- County: Stockholm
- Population: 1,487,014 (2025)
- Electorate: 1,067,786 (2026)
- Area: 6,974 km^{2} (2026)

Current constituency
- Created: 1970
- Seats: List (Note: Constituency seats only.): 41 (2026–present); 39 40 (2022–2026); 39 (2018–2022); 38 (2014–2018); 37 (2010–2014); 36 (2006–2010); 35 (2002–2006); 34 (1998–2002); 33 (1994–1998); 32 (1988–1994); 31 (1985–1988); 30 (1982–1985); 29 (1979–1982); 28 (1976–1979); 27 (1973–1976); 24 (1970–1973)
- Member of the Riksdag: List: Magdalena Andersson (S); Andrea Andersson-Tay (V); Alexandra Anstrell (M); Ajda Asgari (MP); Ludvig Aspling (SD); Yusuf Aydin (KD); Katarina Berggren (S); Christian Carlsson (KD); Nooshi Dadgostar (V); Mikael Damberg (S); Ida Drougge (M); Anders Ekegren (L); Rasmus Elfström (C); Karin Enström (M); Annika Hirvonen (MP); Emil Högberg (S); Fredrik Kärrholm (M); Sarkis Khatchadourian (S); Martin Kinnunen (SD); Julia Kronlid (SD); Andrea Kronvall (SD); Anna Lasses (C); Joanna Lewerentz (M); Amanda Lind (MP); Fredrik Lindahl (SD); Jonas Lindberg (V); Kerstin Lundgren (C); Josefin Malmqvist (M); Louise Minnhagen (L); Leif Nysmed (S); Erik Ottoson (M); Adam Reuterskiöld (M); Azadeh Rojhan (S); Alexander Rosenberg (M); Markus Selin (S); Sandra Sönnergren (V); Maria Stockhaus (M); Mathias Tegnér (S); Alexandra Völker (S); Åsa Westlund (S); Martin Westmont (SD); Marcus Willershausen (L); Andrine Winther (S); Leonid Yurkovskiy (SD)
- Created from: Stockholm County

Stockholm County (Swedish: Stockholms Län) is one of the 29 multi-member constituencies of the Riksdag, the national legislature of Sweden. The constituency was established in 1970 when the Riksdag changed from a bicameral legislature to a unicameral legislature. It is conterminous with the county of Stockholm but excludes Stockholm Municipality which has its own constituency. The constituency currently elects 41 of the 349 members of the Riksdag using the open party-list proportional representation electoral system. At the 2026 general election it had 1,067,786 registered electors.

== Electoral system ==
Stockholm County currently elects 41 of the 349 members of the Riksdag using the open party-list proportional representation electoral system. Constituency seats are allocated using the modified Sainte-Laguë method. Only parties that reach the 4% national threshold and parties that receive at least 12% of the vote in the constituency compete for constituency seats. Supplementary levelling seats may also be allocated at the constituency level to parties that reach the 4% national threshold.

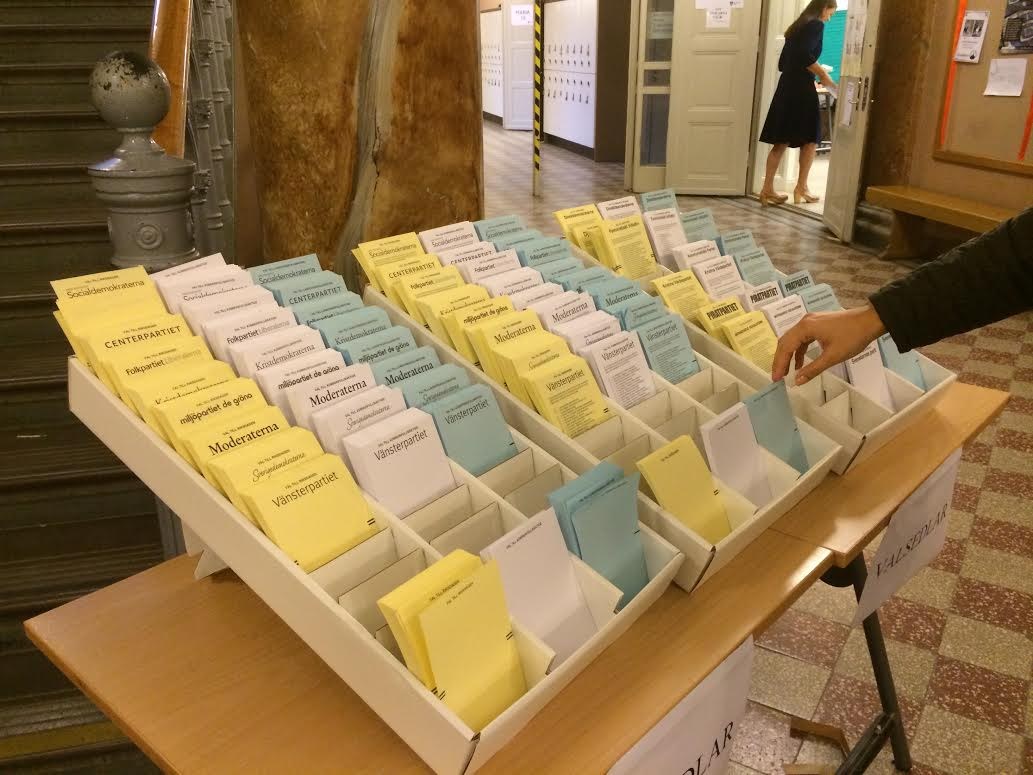
A selection of ballot papers available for voters at the 2014 general election in Stockholm - yellow for the Riksdag, blue for the regional council and white for the municipal council

Prior to 1997 voters could cast any ballot paper they wanted, though it had to contain the name of a party and the name of at least one candidate nominated by that party in the constituency. It was common for parties to hand out ballot papers with their name and list of candidates at the entrance of polling stations. Voters could delete the names of candidates or write-in the names of other candidates but in practice these options weren't used enough by voters to have any significant impact on the results and consequently elections operated as a closed system.

Since 1997, elections in Sweden follow the French model in having separate ballot papers for each party/list in a constituency. There are two ballot papers for each party - a party ballot paper (partivalsedel) with just the name of the party and a name ballot paper (namnvalsedel) with the name of the party and its list of candidates. There are also blank ballot papers (blank valsedel). Voters can initially pick as many ballot papers as they wish and then, in the secrecy of the voting booth, they select a single ballot paper of their choice. If they chose a name ballot paper they have the option of casting a preferential vote for one of their chosen party's candidates. If they chose a blank ballot paper they can write the name of any party including unregistered parties and, optionally, they can write the name of any person as their preferred candidate, even one that does not belong to their chosen party. They then place their chosen ballot paper in an envelope which is placed in the ballot box, discarding all other ballot papers they picked.

Seats won by each party/list in a constituency are allocated to its candidates in order of preference votes (a personal mandate), provided that the candidate has received at least 8% of votes cast for their party in the constituency (5% since January 2011). Any unfilled seats are then allocated to the party's remaining candidates in the order they appear on the party list (a party mandate).

== Election results ==
=== Summary ===
Election	Left V / VPK			Social Democrats S			Greens MP			Centre C			Liberals L / FP / F			Moderates M			Christian Democrats KD / KDS			Sweden Democrats SD		
Election	Votes	%	Seats	Votes	%	Seats	Votes	%	Seats	Votes	%	Seats	Votes	%	Seats	Votes	%	Seats	Votes	%	Seats	Votes	%	Seats
2026	71,843	8.10%	4	229,173	25.83%	11	50,638	5.71%	2	69,312	7.81%	3	58,824	6.63%	3	211,111	23.80%	10	50,651	5.71%	2	132,386	14.92%	6
2022	51,623	6.28%	3	223,056	27.12%	11	42,284	5.14%	2	60,776	7.39%	3	48,949	5.95%	2	197,466	24.01%	10	40,207	4.89%	2	144,315	17.55%	7
2018	56,466	6.93%	3	187,924	23.06%	9	39,042	4.79%	2	69,786	8.56%	3	56,525	6.94%	3	212,009	26.01%	10	56,884	6.98%	3	124,226	15.24%	6
2014	35,722	4.67%	2	183,738	24.04%	9	59,586	7.80%	3	38,898	5.09%	2	53,766	7.04%	3	249,616	32.66%	13	40,492	5.30%	2	74,136	9.70%	4
2010	31,617	4.41%	2	159,222	22.23%	8	53,788	7.51%	3	41,369	5.77%	2	59,461	8.30%	3	286,249	39.96%	15	44,880	6.27%	2	29,886	4.17%	2
2006	31,161	4.74%	2	171,901	26.16%	10	36,365	5.53%	2	34,998	5.33%	2	60,178	9.16%	3	252,100	38.36%	14	43,792	6.66%	3	12,471	1.90%	0
2002	43,268	7.01%	2	206,560	33.47%	12	30,005	4.86%	2	16,477	2.67%	1	113,485	18.39%	7	138,456	22.43%	8	54,872	8.89%	3	6,385	1.03%	0
1998	54,358	9.25%	3	180,073	30.63%	11	25,616	4.36%	1	14,692	2.50%	1	35,159	5.98%	2	198,995	33.85%	12	65,182	11.09%	4			
1994	32,360	5.44%	2	223,902	37.63%	13	30,032	5.05%	2	24,979	4.20%	1	55,933	9.40%	3	193,581	32.53%	11	20,419	3.43%	1			
1991	23,560	4.07%	1	173,268	29.91%	10	22,833	3.94%	0	24,571	4.24%	1	69,408	11.98%	4	185,968	32.10%	11	29,548	5.10%	2			
1988	35,440	6.37%	2	196,700	35.37%	12	33,269	5.98%	2	35,288	6.35%	2	89,048	16.01%	5	152,483	27.42%	9	9,891	1.78%	0			
1985	32,947	5.89%	2	214,044	38.28%	12	9,078	1.62%	0	32,196	5.76%	2	96,061	17.18%	5	171,700	30.70%	10	with C					
1982	35,497	6.63%	2	213,918	39.94%	12	11,726	2.19%	0	54,654	10.20%	3	31,600	5.90%	2	181,144	33.82%	11	5,676	1.06%	0			
1979	36,743	7.20%	2	192,980	37.82%	11				67,185	13.17%	4	61,030	11.96%	4	144,543	28.33%	8	4,111	0.81%	0			
1976	30,613	6.18%	2	184,948	37.35%	11				96,243	19.43%	5	66,357	13.40%	4	110,671	22.35%	6	3,520	0.71%	0			
1973	30,820	6.82%	2	173,849	38.45%	10				100,558	22.24%	6	47,050	10.41%	3	91,781	20.30%	6	4,547	1.01%	0			
1970	21,082	5.35%	1	166,549	42.26%	10				62,122	15.76%	4	77,737	19.72%	5	59,768	15.16%	4	4,141	1.05%	0			

(Excludes levelling seats. Figures in italics represent alliances/joint lists.)

=== Detailed ===
Party has received at least 4% of the vote nationally and is entitled to compete for constituency seats.

==== 2020s ====
===== 2026 =====
Results of the 2026 general election held on 13 September 2026:

Party		Votes	%	Seats		
Party		Votes	%	Con.	Lev.	Tot.
Swedish Social Democratic Party	S	229,173	25.83%	11	1	12
Moderate Party	M	211,111	23.80%	10	0	10
Sweden Democrats	SD	132,386	14.92%	6	0	6
Left Party	V	71,843	8.10%	4	0	4
Centre Party	C	69,312	7.81%	3	0	3
Liberals	L	58,824	6.63%	3	0	3
Christian Democrats	KD	50,651	5.71%	2	0	2
Green Party	MP	50,638	5.71%	2	1	3
Alternative for Sweden	AfS	3,557	0.40%	0	0	0
Örebro Party	ÖP	3,491	0.39%	0	0	0
Christian Values Party	KrVP	1,315	0.15%	0	0	0
Ambition Sweden	AS	1,002	0.11%	0	0	0
Pirate Party	PP	974	0.11%	0	0	0
Citizens' Coalition	MED	723	0.08%	0	0	0
Human Rights and Democracy	MoD	497	0.06%	0	0	0
Nuance Party	PNy	478	0.05%	0	0	0
Communist Party of Sweden	SKP	375	0.04%	0	0	0
Direct Democrats	DD	148	0.02%	0	0	0
United Voice	ER	143	0.02%	0	0	0
RegleraAI.nu		88	0.01%	0	0	0
Turning Point Party	PV	34	0.00%	0	0	0
Volt Sweden	Volt	34	0.00%	0	0	0
The Push Buttons	Kn	29	0.00%	0	0	0
Nordic Resistance Movement	NMR	26	0.00%	0	0	0
Classical Liberal Party	KLP	24	0.00%	0	0	0
NY Reform	NR	23	0.00%	0	0	0
Donald Duck Party		20	0.00%	0	0	0
Unity	ENH	16	0.00%	0	0	0
Communist Party	K	15	0.00%	0	0	0
United Sweden		14	0.00%	0	0	0
A Good Sweden		12	0.00%	0	0	0
Independent Rural Party	LPo	12	0.00%	0	0	0
Knowledge-Democratic Party		11	0.00%	0	0	0
Pax		6	0.00%	0	0	0
Peace Team		6	0.00%	0	0	0
Pensioners' Party		5	0.00%	0	0	0
People's List		5	0.00%	0	0	0
New Allance		4	0.00%	0	0	0
Animal Lovers' Party		3	0.00%	0	0	0
Progress		3	0.00%	0	0	0
Sympathy Party		3	0.00%	0	0	0
Viking		3	0.00%	0	0	0
Vision Party		3	0.00%	0	0	0
AI Party		2	0.00%	0	0	0
Architecture Uprising Party		2	0.00%	0	0	0
Faith in the Future	FT	2	0.00%	0	0	0
For the Good of All		2	0.00%	0	0	0
Jesus		2	0.00%	0	0	0
John Party with Extra Moose		2	0.00%	0	0	0
People's Council		2	0.00%	0	0	0
Sensible Party		2	0.00%	0	0	0
Socialist Party		2	0.00%	0	0	0
Sweden's Independent Members		2	0.00%	0	0	0
The Libertarians		2	0.00%	0	0	0
99 Black Balloons		1	0.00%	0	0	0
A Modern Country		1	0.00%	0	0	0
Civis		1	0.00%	0	0	0
Common Security		1	0.00%	0	0	0
Democracy, People and Religion	DFR	1	0.00%	0	0	0
Evil Chicken Party	OKP	1	0.00%	0	0	0
Freedom of the Family		1	0.00%	0	0	0
Lovely		1	0.00%	0	0	0
Neutral Party		1	0.00%	0	0	0
O		1	0.00%	0	0	0
Origin		1	0.00%	0	0	0
Party for Justice and Equality	PRJ	1	0.00%	0	0	0
Secular Humanist Party		1	0.00%	0	0	0
Social Liberals		1	0.00%	0	0	0
United Democrats		1	0.00%	0	0	0
United Politics		1	0.00%	0	0	0
Valid votes		887,078	100.00%	41	2	43
Blank votes		6,701	0.75%			
Rejected votes – unregistered parties		173	0.02%			
Rejected votes – other		1,023	0.11%			
Total polled		894,975	83.82%			
Registered electors		1,067,786				

The following candidates were elected:

- Constituency seats (personal mandates) - Magdalena Andersson (S), 49,183 votes; Nooshi Dadgostar (V), 19,355 votes; and Amanda Lind (MP), 7,023 votes.
- Constituency seats (party mandates) - Andrea Andersson-Tay (V), 261 votes; Alexandra Anstrell (M), 271 votes; Ludvig Aspling (SD), 366 votes; Katarina Berggren (S), 586 votes; Johan Britz (L), 146 votes; Christian Carlsson (KD), 46 votes; Mikael Damberg (S), 1,769 votes; Ida Drougge (M), 528 votes; Rasmus Elfström (C), 971 votes; Karin Enström (M), 508 votes; Jakob Forssmed (KD), 440 votes; Annika Hirvonen (MP), 607 votes; Karin Karlsbro (L), 124 votes; Fredrik Kärrholm (M), 928 votes; Sarkis Khatchadourian (S), 1,266 votes; Martin Kinnunen (SD), 123 votes; Julia Kronlid (SD), 223 votes; Andrea Kronvall (SD), 155 votes; Nina Larsson (L), 131 votes; Anna Lasses (C), 1,036 votes; Joanna Lewerentz (M), 355 votes; Parisa Liljestrand (M), 994 votes; Fredrik Lindahl (SD), 119 votes; Jonas Lindberg (V), 710 votes; Kerstin Lundgren (C), 1,388 votes; Josefin Malmqvist (M), 356 votes; Leif Nysmed (S), 489 votes; Erik Ottoson (M), 341 votes; Adam Reuterskiöld (M), 243 votes; Azadeh Rojhan Gustafsson (S), 552 votes; Markus Selin (S), 345 votes; Sandra Sönnergren (V), 335 votes; Mathias Tegnér (S), 443 votes; Alexandra Völker (S), 429 votes; Åsa Westlund (S), 678 votes; Martin Westmont (SD), 14 votes; Andrine Winther (S), 193 votes; Niklas Wykman (M), 841 votes;
- Levelling seats (party mandates) - Ajda Asgari (MP), 387 votes; and Emil Högberg (S), 278 votes.

Permanent substitutions:

- Karin Karlsbro (L) resigned on 28 September 2026 and was replaced by Anders Ekegren (L) on 29 September 2026.

===== 2022 =====
Results of the 2022 general election held on 11 September 2022:

Party		Votes	%	Seats		
Party		Votes	%	Con.	Lev.	Tot.
Swedish Social Democratic Party	S	223,056	27.12%	11	0	11
Moderate Party	M	197,466	24.01%	10	0	10
Sweden Democrats	SD	144,315	17.55%	7	1	8
Centre Party	C	60,776	7.39%	3	0	3
Left Party	V	51,623	6.28%	3	0	3
Liberals	L	48,949	5.95%	2	1	3
Green Party	MP	42,284	5.14%	2	1	3
Christian Democrats	KD	40,207	4.89%	2	0	2
Nuance Party	PNy	4,253	0.52%	0	0	0
Citizens' Coalition	MED	2,184	0.27%	0	0	0
Alternative for Sweden	AfS	2,047	0.25%	0	0	0
Pirate Party	PP	1,420	0.17%	0	0	0
Human Rights and Democracy	MoD	798	0.10%	0	0	0
Christian Values Party	KrVP	750	0.09%	0	0	0
The Push Buttons	Kn	646	0.08%	0	0	0
Feminist Initiative	FI	394	0.05%	0	0	0
Communist Party of Sweden	SKP	296	0.04%	0	0	0
Direct Democrats	DD	235	0.03%	0	0	0
Climate Alliance	KA	226	0.03%	0	0	0
Unity	ENH	125	0.02%	0	0	0
Independent Rural Party	LPo	83	0.01%	0	0	0
Turning Point Party	PV	73	0.01%	0	0	0
Nordic Resistance Movement	NMR	70	0.01%	0	0	0
Classical Liberal Party	KLP	33	0.00%	0	0	0
NY Reform	NR	32	0.00%	0	0	0
Hard Line Sweden		24	0.00%	0	0	0
Sweden Out of the EU/ Free Justice Party		24	0.00%	0	0	0
Basic Income Party	BASIP	20	0.00%	0	0	0
Socialist Welfare Party	S-V	19	0.00%	0	0	0
Donald Duck Party		15	0.00%	0	0	0
Freedom Party		13	0.00%	0	0	0
Volt Sweden	Volt	12	0.00%	0	0	0
United Democratic Party		6	0.00%	0	0	0
European Workers Party	EAP	5	0.00%	0	0	0
Freedom of the Family		4	0.00%	0	0	0
The Duck Party		4	0.00%	0	0	0
Evil Chicken Party	OKP	3	0.00%	0	0	0
Scania Party	SKÅ	3	0.00%	0	0	0
Love		2	0.00%	0	0	0
Pax		2	0.00%	0	0	0
Poor Man's Party		2	0.00%	0	0	0
Faith in the Future	FT	1	0.00%	0	0	0
Freedom Movement		1	0.00%	0	0	0
John Mikkonen		1	0.00%	0	0	0
My Voice		1	0.00%	0	0	0
National Law of Sweden		1	0.00%	0	0	0
Now That Will Be Enough		1	0.00%	0	0	0
Peace Party		1	0.00%	0	0	0
Reform Party		1	0.00%	0	0	0
The Anarchists		1	0.00%	0	0	0
United Politics		1	0.00%	0	0	0
Yellow Vests		1	0.00%	0	0	0
Valid votes		822,510	100.00%	40	3	43
Blank votes		6,746	0.81%			
Rejected votes – unregistered parties		145	0.02%			
Rejected votes – other		804	0.10%			
Total polled		830,205	82.49%			
Registered electors		1,006,456				

The following candidates were elected:

- Constituency seats (personal mandates) - Magdalena Andersson (S), 45,989 votes; Nooshi Dadgostar (V), 13,796 votes; and Märta Stenevi (MP), 3,296 votes.
- Constituency seats (party mandates) - Alireza Akhondi (C), 191 votes; Andrea Andersson-Tay (V), 132 votes; Alexandra Anstrell (M), 364 votes; Mats Arkhem (SD), 23 votes; Ludvig Aspling (SD), 90 votes; Gulan Avci (L), 273 votes; Tobias Billström (M), 823 votes; Christian Carlsson (KD), 100 votes; Mikael Damberg (S), 862 votes; Ida Drougge (M), 651 votes; Karin Enström (M), 530 votes; Jakob Forssmed (KD), 313 votes; Kjell Jansson (M), 297 votes; Martin Kinnunen (SD), 126 votes; Serkan Köse (S), 746 votes; Julia Kronlid (SD), 360 votes; Anna Lasses (C), 127 votes; Amanda Lind (MP), 675 votes; Fredrik Lindahl (SD), 99 votes; Kerstin Lundgren (C), 172 votes; Josefin Malmqvist (M), 572 votes; Ingela Nylund Watz (S), 197 votes; Leif Nysmed (S), 362 votes; Erik Ottoson (M), 309 votes; Daniel Riazat (V), 733 votes; Azadeh Rojhan Gustafsson (S), 405 votes; Magdalena Schröder (M), 271 votes; Markus Selin (S), 366 votes; Anna Starbrink (L), 316 votes; Robert Stenkvist (SD), 68 votes; Maria Stockhaus (M), 364 votes; Mathias Tegnér (S), 377 votes; Anna Vikström (S), 366 votes; Alexandra Völker (S), 440 votes; Åsa Westlund (S), 538 votes; Niklas Wykman (M), 403 votes; and Leonid Yurkovskiy (SD), 23 votes.
- Levelling seats (party mandates) - Annika Hirvonen (MP), 339 votes; Fredrik Malm (L), 199 votes; and Beatrice Timgren (SD), 25 votes.

Permanent substitutions:

- Beatrice Timgren (SD) resigned on 15 July 2024 upon being elected to the European Parliament and was replaced by Msciwoj Swigon (SD) on 16 July 2024.
- Msciwoj Swigon resigned on 20 August 2024 and was replaced by Christian Lindefjärd (SD) on the same day.
- Tobias Billström (M) resigned on 10 September 2024 and was replaced by Adam Reuterskiöld (M) on the same day.
- Anna Starbrink (L) resigned on 23 February 2025 and was replaced by Martin Melin (L) on 24 February 2025.
- Märta Stenevi (MP) resigned on 7 September 2025 and was replaced by Amanda Palmstierna (MP) on 8 September 2025.

==== 2010s ====
===== 2018 =====
Results of the 2018 general election held on 9 September 2018:

Party		Votes	%	Seats		
Party		Votes	%	Con.	Lev.	Tot.
Moderate Party	M	212,009	26.01%	10	1	11
Swedish Social Democratic Party	S	187,924	23.06%	9	1	10
Sweden Democrats	SD	124,226	15.24%	6	1	7
Centre Party	C	69,786	8.56%	3	0	3
Christian Democrats	KD	56,884	6.98%	3	0	3
Liberals	L	56,525	6.94%	3	0	3
Left Party	V	56,466	6.93%	3	0	3
Green Party	MP	39,042	4.79%	2	1	3
Feminist Initiative	FI	3,084	0.38%	0	0	0
Alternative for Sweden	AfS	2,759	0.34%	0	0	0
Citizens' Coalition	MED	2,186	0.27%	0	0	0
Pirate Party	PP	807	0.10%	0	0	0
Direct Democrats	DD	623	0.08%	0	0	0
Unity	ENH	583	0.07%	0	0	0
Christian Values Party	KrVP	577	0.07%	0	0	0
Animal Party	DjuP	520	0.06%	0	0	0
Nordic Resistance Movement	NMR	284	0.03%	0	0	0
Classical Liberal Party	KLP	167	0.02%	0	0	0
Independent Rural Party	LPo	151	0.02%	0	0	0
Initiative	INI	127	0.02%	0	0	0
Communist Party of Sweden	SKP	109	0.01%	0	0	0
Basic Income Party	BASIP	55	0.01%	0	0	0
Freedom of the Justice Party	S-FRP	26	0.00%	0	0	0
NY Reform		19	0.00%	0	0	0
European Workers Party	EAP	15	0.00%	0	0	0
Security Party	TRP	3	0.00%	0	0	0
Parties not on the ballot		74	0.01%	0	0	0
Valid votes		815,031	100.00%	39	4	43
Blank votes		5,033	0.61%			
Rejected votes – unregistered parties		258	0.03%			
Rejected votes – other		465	0.06%			
Total polled		820,787	86.62%			
Registered electors		947,622				

The following candidates were elected:

- Constituency seats (personal mandates) - Magdalena Andersson (S), 10,205 votes; Alice Bah Kuhnke (MP), 3,305 votes; Jan Björklund (L), 7,337 votes; and Gustav Fridolin (MP), 2,882 votes.
- Constituency seats (party mandates) - Alireza Akhondi (C), 160 votes; Erik Andersson (M), 289 votes; Alexandra Anstrell (M), 469 votes; Maria Arnholm (L), 369 votes; Ludvig Aspling (SD), 10 votes; Hanif Bali (M), 4,158 votes; Ibrahim Baylan (S), 2,925 votes; Camilla Brodin (KD), 111 votes; Bo Broman (SD), 4 votes; Mikael Damberg (S), 2,054 votes; Lorena Delgado Varas (V), 345 votes; Karin Enström (M), 324 votes; Jakob Forssmed (KD), 247 votes; Ida Gabrielsson (V), 210 votes; Robert Halef (KD), 2,172 votes; Helene Hellmark Knutsson (S), 1,606 votes; Kjell Jansson (M), 306 votes; Amineh Kakabaveh (V), 1,328 votes; Martin Kinnunen (SD), 127 votes; Serkan Köse (S), 2,007 votes; Julia Kronlid (SD), 298 votes; Per Lodenius (C), 235 votes; Kerstin Lundgren (C), 162 votes; Josefin Malmqvist (M), 361 votes; Ingela Nylund Watz (S), 666 votes; Erik Ottoson (M), 219 votes; Robert Stenkvist (SD), 97 votes; Maria Stockhaus (M), 998 votes; Mikael Strandman (SD), 83 votes; Tomas Tobé (M), 361 votes; Alexandra Völker (S), 796 votes; Barbro Westerholm (L), 633 votes; Åsa Westlund (S), 1,217 votes; and Niklas Wykman (M), 313 votes.
- Levelling seats (party mandates) - Ida Drougge (M), 416 votes; Fredrik Lindahl (SD), 34 votes; Karolina Skog (MP), 568 votes; and Mathias Tegnér (S), 848 votes.

Permanent substitutions:

- Erik Andersson (M) resigned on 11 November 2018 and was replaced by Magdalena Schröder (M) on 12 November 2018.
- Alice Bah Kuhnke (MP) resigned on 18 June 2019 upon being elected to the European Parliament and was replaced by Annika Hirvonen Falk (MP) on 19 June 2019.
- Tomas Tobé (M) resigned on 1 July 2019 upon being elected to the European Parliament and was replaced by Fredrik Schulte (M) on 2 July 2019.
- Gustav Fridolin (MP) resigned on 30 September 2019 and was replaced by Amanda Palmstierna (MP) on 1 October 2019.
- Jan Björklund (L) resigned on 31 October 2019 and was replaced by Nina Lundström (L) on 1 November 2019.
- Maria Arnholm (L) resigned on 31 January 2020 and was replaced by Malin Danielsson (L) on 1 February 2020.
- Helene Hellmark Knutsson (S) resigned on 31 July 2020 and was replaced by Anna Vikström (S) on 1 August 2020.
- Per Lodenius (C) resigned on 30 September 2021 and was replaced by Aphram Melki (C) on 1 October 2021.
- Karolina Skog (MP) resigned on 10 January 2022 and was replaced by Martin Marmgren (MP) on 11 January 2022.
- Fredrik Schulte (M) resigned on 22 March 2022 and was replaced by Richard Herrey (M) on 23 March 2022.
- Ibrahim Baylan (S) resigned on 28 June 2022 and was replaced by Azadeh Rojhan Gustafsson (S) on the same day.

===== 2014 =====
Results of the 2014 general election held on 14 September 2014:

Party		Votes	%	Seats		
Party		Votes	%	Con.	Lev.	Tot.
Moderate Party	M	249,616	32.66%	13	0	13
Swedish Social Democratic Party	S	183,738	24.04%	9	0	9
Sweden Democrats	SD	74,136	9.70%	4	0	4
Green Party	MP	59,586	7.80%	3	0	3
Liberal People's Party	FP	53,766	7.04%	3	0	3
Christian Democrats	KD	40,492	5.30%	2	1	3
Centre Party	C	38,898	5.09%	2	0	2
Left Party	V	35,722	4.67%	2	0	2
Feminist Initiative	FI	20,573	2.69%	0	0	0
Pirate Party	PP	3,490	0.46%	0	0	0
Unity	ENH	793	0.10%	0	0	0
Animal Party	DjuP	756	0.10%	0	0	0
Christian Values Party	KrVP	637	0.08%	0	0	0
Party of the Swedes	SVP	539	0.07%	0	0	0
Direct Democrats	DD	215	0.03%	0	0	0
Socialist Justice Party	RS	157	0.02%	0	0	0
Independent Rural Party	LPo	150	0.02%	0	0	0
Classical Liberal Party	KLP	148	0.02%	0	0	0
Communist Party of Sweden	SKP	100	0.01%	0	0	0
European Workers Party	EAP	46	0.01%	0	0	0
New Party		16	0.00%	0	0	0
Freedom of the Justice Party	S-FRP	8	0.00%	0	0	0
Swedish Senior Citizen Interest Party	SPI	8	0.00%	0	0	0
New Swedes	DPNS	3	0.00%	0	0	0
Peace Democrats	FD	2	0.00%	0	0	0
Progressive Party		1	0.00%	0	0	0
Parties not on the ballot		599	0.08%	0	0	0
Valid votes		764,195	100.00%	38	1	39
Blank votes		5,702	0.74%			
Rejected votes – other		289	0.04%			
Total polled		770,186	85.52%			
Registered electors		900,574				

The following candidates were elected:

- Constituency seats (personal mandates) - Jan Björklund (FP), 5,282 votes; and Robert Halef (KD), 2,521 votes.
- Constituency seats (party mandates) - Erik Andersson (M), 185 votes; Magdalena Andersson (S), 4,529 votes; Maria Arnholm (FP), 725 votes; Anti Avsan (M), 136 votes; Hanif Bali (M), 395 votes; Ibrahim Baylan (S), 5,945 votes; Ewa Björling (M), 171 votes; Nooshi Dadgostar (V), 180 votes; Mikael Damberg (S), 6,459 votes; Esabelle Dingizian (MP), 296 votes; Ida Drougge (M), 381 votes; Catharina Elmsäter-Svärd (M), 626 votes; Hillevi Engström (M), 190 votes; Karin Enström (M), 224 votes; Ali Esbati (V), 788 votes; Sofia Fölster (M), 445 votes; Jakob Forssmed (KD), 145 votes; Roger Hedlund (SD), 6 votes; Carina Herrstedt (SD), 94 votes; Annika Hirvonen Falk (MP), 409 votes; Yilmaz Kerimo (S), 1,868 votes; Anna Kinberg Batra (M), 705 votes; Julia Kronlid (SD), 106 votes; Per Lodenius (C), 710 votes; Kerstin Lundgren (C), 861 votes; Ingela Nylund Watz (S), 899 votes; Leif Nysmed (S), 1,119 votes; Göran Pettersson (M), 137 votes; Carl Schlyter (MP), 495 votes; Björn Söder (SD), 151 votes; Maria Stockhaus (M), 316 votes; Björn von Sydow (S), 1,724 votes; Alexandra Völker (S), 944 votes; Barbro Westerholm (FP), 661 votes; Åsa Westlund (S), 1,717 votes; and Niklas Wykman (M), 283 votes.
- Levelling seats (party mandates) - Emma Henriksson (KD), 488 votes.

Permanent substitutions:

- Ewa Björling (M) resigned on 16 October 2014 and was replaced by Fredrik Schulte (M) on the same day.
- Catharina Elmsäter-Svärd (M) resigned on 16 December 2014 and was replaced by Isabella Hökmark (M) on 17 December 2014.
- Hillevi Engström (M) resigned on 19 January 2015 and was replaced by Erik Ottoson (M) on 20 January 2015.

===== 2010 =====
Results of the 2010 general election held on 19 September 2010:

Party		Votes	%	Seats		
Party		Votes	%	Con.	Lev.	Tot.
Moderate Party	M	286,249	39.96%	15	0	15
Swedish Social Democratic Party	S	159,222	22.23%	8	0	8
Liberal People's Party	FP	59,461	8.30%	3	0	3
Green Party	MP	53,788	7.51%	3	0	3
Christian Democrats	KD	44,880	6.27%	2	1	3
Centre Party	C	41,369	5.77%	2	0	2
Left Party	V	31,617	4.41%	2	0	2
Sweden Democrats	SD	29,886	4.17%	2	0	2
Pirate Party	PP	5,412	0.76%	0	0	0
Feminist Initiative	FI	2,735	0.38%	0	0	0
National Democrats	ND	457	0.06%	0	0	0
Socialist Justice Party	RS	325	0.05%	0	0	0
Swedish Senior Citizen Interest Party	SPI	170	0.02%	0	0	0
Classical Liberal Party	KLP	98	0.01%	0	0	0
Unity	ENH	82	0.01%	0	0	0
Freedom Party		69	0.01%	0	0	0
European Workers Party	EAP	57	0.01%	0	0	0
Communist Party of Sweden	SKP	54	0.01%	0	0	0
Party of the Swedes	SVP	54	0.01%	0	0	0
Health Care Party	Sjvåp	53	0.01%	0	0	0
Spirits Party		50	0.01%	0	0	0
Norrländska Coalition	NorrS	23	0.00%	0	0	0
Rural Democrats		10	0.00%	0	0	0
Active Democracy		8	0.00%	0	0	0
Freedom of the Justice Party	S-FRP	8	0.00%	0	0	0
Communist League	KommF	6	0.00%	0	0	0
Alliance Party / Citizen's Voice	ALP	1	0.00%	0	0	0
Nordic Union		1	0.00%	0	0	0
Republican Party		1	0.00%	0	0	0
Rikshushållarna		1	0.00%	0	0	0
Parties not on the ballot		202	0.03%	0	0	0
Valid votes		716,349	100.00%	37	1	38
Blank votes		6,206	0.86%			
Rejected votes – other		245	0.03%			
Total polled		722,800	84.97%			
Registered electors		850,629				

The following candidates were elected:

- Constituency seats (personal mandates) - Jan Björklund (FP), 7,165 votes; Thomas Bodström (S), 16,807 votes; and Lars Ohly (V), 5,244 votes.
- Constituency seats (party mandates) - Anti Avsan (M), 177 votes; Hanif Bali (M), 363 votes; Ewa Björling (M), 407 votes; Mikael Damberg (S), 797 votes; Esabelle Dingizian (MP), 225 votes; Kent Ekeroth (SD),107 votes; Hillevi Engström (M), 607 votes; Karin Enström (M), 219 votes; Peter Eriksson (MP), 3,355 votes; Mats Gerdau (M), 183 votes; Isabella Jernbeck (M), 232 votes; Amineh Kakabaveh (V), 342 votes; Anna Kinberg Batra (M), 474 votes; Per Lodenius (C), 794 votes; Malin Löfsjögård (M), 216 votes; Kerstin Lundgren (C), 928 votes; Nina Lundström (FP), 353 votes; Carina Moberg (S), 911 votes; Ingela Nylund Watz (S), 820 votes; Mats Odell (KD), 536 votes; Désirée Pethrus Engström (KD), 136 votes; Göran Pettersson (M), 259 votes; Marietta de Pourbaix-Lundin (M), 151 votes; Eliza Roszkowska Öberg (M), 242 votes; Nyamko Sabuni (FP), 1,787 votes; Mikael Sandström (M), 85 votes; Fredrik Schulte (M), 162 votes; Karl Sigfrid (M), 179 votes; Björn Söder (SD), 99 votes; Björn von Sydow (S), 1,601 votes; Mikaela Valtersson (MP), 750 votes; Tommy Waidelich (S), 388 votes; Maryam Yazdanfar (S), 1,440 votes; and Christina Zedell (S), 895 votes.
- Levelling seats (party mandates) - Emma Henriksson (KD), 407 votes.

Permanent substitutions:

- Thomas Bodström (S) resigned on 19 October 2010 and was replaced by Yilmaz Kerimo (S) on the same day.
- Mikaela Valtersson (MP) resigned on 15 September 2011 and was replaced by Mats Pertoft (MP) on the same day.
- Malin Löfsjögård (M) resigned on 18 March 2012 and was replaced by Rune Wikström (M) on 19 March 2012.
- Carina Moberg (S) died on 15 August 2012 and was replaced by Meeri Wasberg (S) on 17 August 2012.
- Mats Gerdau (M) resigned on 31 December 2012 and was replaced by Metin Ataseven (M) on 1 January 2013.
- Nyamko Sabuni (FP) resigned on 22 January 2013 and was replaced by Erik Ullenhag (FP) on the same day.
- Maryam Yazdanfar (S) resigned on 14 April 2013 and was replaced by Ardalan Shekarabi (S) on 15 April 2013.
- Peter Eriksson (MP) resigned on 23 June 2014 and was replaced by Annika Hirvonen (MP) on 24 June 2014.

==== 2000s ====
===== 2006 =====
Results of the 2006 general election held on 17 September 2006:

Party		Votes	%	Seats		
Party		Votes	%	Con.	Lev.	Tot.
Moderate Party	M	252,100	38.36%	14	3	17
Swedish Social Democratic Party	S	171,901	26.16%	10	0	10
Liberal People's Party	FP	60,178	9.16%	3	1	4
Christian Democrats	KD	43,792	6.66%	3	0	3
Green Party	MP	36,365	5.53%	2	1	3
Centre Party	C	34,998	5.33%	2	1	3
Left Party	V	31,161	4.74%	2	0	2
Sweden Democrats	SD	12,471	1.90%	0	0	0
Feminist Initiative	FI	4,216	0.64%	0	0	0
Pirate Party	PP	3,723	0.57%	0	0	0
June List		2,338	0.36%	0	0	0
National Democrats	ND	1,163	0.18%	0	0	0
Swedish Senior Citizen Interest Party	SPI	891	0.14%	0	0	0
Health Care Party	Sjvåp	766	0.12%	0	0	0
Unity	ENH	284	0.04%	0	0	0
Socialist Justice Party	RS	226	0.03%	0	0	0
National Socialist Front		143	0.02%	0	0	0
People's Will		88	0.01%	0	0	0
The Communists	KOMM	79	0.01%	0	0	0
New Future	NYF	60	0.01%	0	0	0
European Workers Party	EAP	33	0.01%	0	0	0
Classical Liberal Party	KLP	30	0.00%	0	0	0
Unique Party		24	0.00%	0	0	0
Kvinnokraft		23	0.00%	0	0	0
Freedom of the Justice Party	S-FRP	11	0.00%	0	0	0
Active Democracy		10	0.00%	0	0	0
Communist League	KommF	10	0.00%	0	0	0
Partiet.se		8	0.00%	0	0	0
Tax Reformists	Sref	5	0.00%	0	0	0
Nordic Union		1	0.00%	0	0	0
Other parties		126	0.02%	0	0	0
Valid votes		657,224	100.00%	36	6	42
Blank votes		9,584	1.44%			
Rejected votes – other		222	0.03%			
Total polled		667,030	82.93%			
Registered electors		804,300				

The following candidates were elected:

- Constituency seats (personal mandates) - Lars Leijonborg (FP), 6,085 votes; and Lars Ohly (V), 4,231 votes.
- Constituency seats (party mandates) - Anti Avsan (M), 186 votes; Christina Axelsson (S), 467 votes; Ewa Björling (M), 197 votes; Maria Borelius (M), 1,524 votes; Josefin Brink (V), 115 votes; Mikael Damberg (S), 628 votes; Inger Davidson (KD), 1,530 votes; Catharina Elmsäter-Svärd (M), 613 votes; Hillevi Engström (M), 372 votes; Karin Enström (M), 230 votes; Mats Gerdau (M), 251 votes; Björn Hamilton (M), 189 votes; Yilmaz Kerimo (S), 3,072 votes; Anna Kinberg Batra (M), 349 votes; Göran Lennmarker (M), 62 votes; Lennart Levi (C), 547 votes; Kerstin Lundgren (C), 846 votes; Carina Moberg (S), 753 votes; Nils Oskar Nilsson (M), 169 votes; Pär Nuder (S), 4,387 votes; Mats Odell (KD), 1,508 votes; Mats Pertoft (MP), 549 votes; Göran Pettersson (M), 422 votes; Karin Pilsäter (FP), 942 votes; Marietta de Pourbaix-Lundin (M), 236 votes; Mona Sahlin (S), 9,889 votes; Karl Sigfrid (M), 183 votes; Ingvar Svensson (KD), 111 votes; Björn von Sydow (S), 1,538 votes; Mikaela Valtersson (MP), 873 votes; Tommy Waidelich (S), 287 votes; Barbro Westerholm (FP), 828 votes; Maryam Yazdanfar (S), 943 votes; and Christina Zedell (S), 929 votes.
- Levelling seats (party mandates) - Gunnar Andrén (FP), 156 votes; Isabella Jernbeck (M), 184 votes; Per Lodenius (C), 549 votes; Esabelle Reshdouni (MP), 262 votes; Fredrik Schulte (M), 310 votes; and Rune Wikström (M), 309 votes.

Permanent substitutions:

- Maria Borelius (M) resigned on 5 October 2006 and was replaced by Mikael Sandström (M) on 17 October 2006.
- Catharina Elmsäter-Svärd (M) resigned on 29 February 2008 and was replaced by Eliza Roszkowska (M) on 1 March 2008.
- Pär Nuder (S) resigned on 10 March 2009 and was replaced by Jan Emanuel Johansson (S) on 11 March 2009.
- Lars Leijonborg (FP) resigned on 17 June 2009 and was replaced by Helena Bargholtz (FP) on 18 June 2009.

===== 2002 =====
Results of the 2002 general election held on 15 September 2002:

Party		Votes	%	Seats		
Party		Votes	%	Con.	Lev.	Tot.
Swedish Social Democratic Party	S	206,560	33.47%	12	1	13
Moderate Party	M	138,456	22.43%	8	1	9
Liberal People's Party	FP	113,485	18.39%	7	1	8
Christian Democrats	KD	54,872	8.89%	3	0	3
Left Party	V	43,268	7.01%	2	1	3
Green Party	MP	30,005	4.86%	2	0	2
Centre Party	C	16,477	2.67%	1	0	1
Sweden Democrats	SD	6,385	1.03%	0	0	0
National Democrats	ND	2,891	0.47%	0	0	0
Swedish Senior Citizen Interest Party	SPI	2,565	0.42%	0	0	0
New Future	NYF	448	0.07%	0	0	0
Socialist Party	SOC.P	342	0.06%	0	0	0
Socialist Justice Party	RS	320	0.05%	0	0	0
The Communists	KOMM	148	0.02%	0	0	0
Free List		123	0.02%	0	0	0
Norrbotten Party	NBP	101	0.02%	0	0	0
Unity	ENH	64	0.01%	0	0	0
European Workers Party	EAP	29	0.00%	0	0	0
Welfare Party	VALFP	24	0.00%	0	0	0
Communist League	KommF	12	0.00%	0	0	0
New Swedes	DPNS	3	0.00%	0	0	0
Preschool Party		3	0.00%	0	0	0
Tax Reformists	Sref	3	0.00%	0	0	0
Beach Protection Party	SSKP	2	0.00%	0	0	0
Civic Party		1	0.00%	0	0	0
Rikshushållarna	Riksh	1	0.00%	0	0	0
Sports Party	IdroP	1	0.00%	0	0	0
Other parties		598	0.10%	0	0	0
Valid votes		617,187	100.00%	35	4	39
Rejected votes		7,846	1.26%			
Total polled		625,033	81.11%			
Registered electors		770,595				

The following candidates were elected:

- Constituency seats (personal mandates) - Lars Leijonborg (FP), 18,107 votes; and Gudrun Schyman (V), 10,217 votes.
- Constituency seats (party mandates) - Martin Andreasson (FP), 259 votes; Gunnar Andrén (FP), 199 votes; Lars Ångström (MP), 836 votes; Eva Arvidsson (S), 606 votes; Helena Bargholtz (FP), 448 votes; Cinnika Beiming (S), 850 votes; Mikael Damberg (S), 745 votes; Inger Davidson (KD), 342 votes; Catharina Elmsäter-Svärd (M), 1,529 votes; Hillevi Engström (M), 1,279 votes; Karin Enström (M), 947 votes; Mia Franzén (FP), 235 votes; Carl B. Hamilton (FP), 1,336 votes; Chris Heister (M), 6,801 votes; Anita Johansson (S), 406 votes; Yilmaz Kerimo (S), 2,721 votes; Göran Lennmarker (M), 545 votes; Kerstin Lundgren (C), 611 votes; Carina Moberg (S), 843 votes; Pär Nuder (S), 467 votes; Mats Odell (KD), 264 votes; Sermin Özürküt (V), 256 votes; Karin Pilsäter (FP), 1,494 votes; Marietta de Pourbaix-Lundin (M), 666 votes; Ola Rask (S), 372 votes; Fredrik Reinfeldt (M), 3,517 votes; Mona Sahlin (S), 9,943 votes; Ingvar Svensson (KD), 59 votes; Björn von Sydow (S), 1,579 votes; Ingela Thalén (S), 7,681 votes; Mikaela Valtersson (MP), 260 votes; Tommy Waidelich (S), 775 votes; and Henrik Westman (M), 453 votes.
- Levelling seats (party mandates) - Christina Axelsson (S), 368 votes; Ewa Björling (M), 719 votes; Mats Einarsson (V), 47 votes; and Nina Lundström (FP), 177 votes.

Permanent substitutions:

- Chris Heister (M) resigned on 6 November 2002 and was replaced by Björn Hamilton (M) on 7 November 2002.
- Ingela Thalén (S) resigned on 14 June 2004 and was replaced by Jan Emanuel Johansson (S) on 15 June 2004.

==== 1990s ====
===== 1998 =====
Results of the 1998 general election held on 20 September 1998:

Party		Votes	%	Seats		
Party		Votes	%	Con.	Lev.	Tot.
Moderate Party	M	198,995	33.85%	12	1	13
Swedish Social Democratic Party	S	180,073	30.63%	11	0	11
Christian Democrats	KD	65,182	11.09%	4	1	5
Left Party	V	54,358	9.25%	3	0	3
Liberal People's Party	FP	35,159	5.98%	2	1	3
Green Party	MP	25,616	4.36%	1	1	2
Centre Party	C	14,692	2.50%	1	0	1
Other parties		13,857	2.36%	0	0	0
Valid votes		587,932	100.00%	34	4	38
Rejected votes		11,902	1.98%			
Total polled		599,834	82.08%			
Registered electors		730,818				

The following candidates were elected:

- Constituency seats (personal mandates) - Lennart Daléus (C), 2,602 votes; and Lars Leijonborg (FP), 4,209 votes.
- Constituency seats (party mandates) - Eva Arvidsson (S), 748 votes; Cinnika Beiming (S), 793 votes; Knut Billing (M), 278 votes; Inger Davidson (KD), 870 votes; Catharina Elmsäter-Svärd (M), 1,318 votes; Karin Enström (M), 1,425 votes; Amanda Grönlund (KD), 231 votes; Catharina Hagen (M), 1,058 votes; Chris Heister (M), 4,115 votes; Ulla Hoffmann (V), 2,151 votes; Gunnar Hökmark (M), 4,182 votes; Anita Johansson (S), 751 votes; Eva Johansson (S), 857 votes; Kenneth Kvist (V), 1,299 votes; Kalle Larsson (V), 335 votes; Sören Lekberg (S), 652 votes; Göran Lennmarker (M), 233 votes; Gudrun Lindvall (MP), 983 votes; Jerry Martinger (M), 1,925 votes; Carina Moberg (S), 986 votes; Pär Nuder (S), 326 votes; Mats Odell (KD), 387 votes; Karin Pilsäter (FP), 1,758 votes; Marietta de Pourbaix-Lundin (M), 931 votes; Ola Rask (S), 420 votes; Fredrik Reinfeldt (M), 2,861 votes; Stig Rindborg (M), 572 votes; Ingvar Svensson (KD), 43 votes; Björn von Sydow (S), 1,574 votes; Ingela Thalén (S), 12,230 votes; Lars Tobisson (M), 10,342 votes; and Tommy Waidelich (S), 872 votes.
- Levelling seats (party mandates) - Lars Ångström (MP), 1,012 votes; Carl B. Hamilton (FP), 1,122 votes; Inger Strömbom (KD), 77 votes; and Henrik Westman (M), 853 votes.

Permanent substitutions:

- Carl B. Hamilton (FP) resigned on 5 October 1998 and was replaced by Helena Bargholtz (FP) on the same day.
- Jerry Martinger (M) resigned on 16 October 2001 and was replaced by Margareta Nachmanson (M) on 17 October 2001.
- Lars Tobisson (M) resigned on 31 December 2001 and was replaced by Petra Gardos (M) on 1 January 2002.

===== 1994 =====
Results of the 1994 general election held on 18 September 1994:

Party		Votes	%	Seats		
Party		Votes	%	Con.	Lev.	Tot.
Swedish Social Democratic Party	S	223,902	37.63%	13	1	14
Moderate Party	M	193,581	32.53%	11	0	11
Liberal People's Party	FP	55,933	9.40%	3	0	3
Left Party	V	32,360	5.44%	2	0	2
Green Party	MP	30,032	5.05%	2	0	2
Centre Party	C	24,979	4.20%	1	1	2
Christian Democratic Unity	KDS	20,419	3.43%	1	1	2
New Democracy	NyD	8,299	1.39%	0	0	0
Other parties		5,493	0.92%	0	0	0
Valid votes		594,998	100.00%	33	3	36
Rejected votes		9,906	1.64%			
Total polled		604,904	87.35%			
Registered electors		692,514				

The following candidates were elected: Knut Billing (M); Andreas Carlgren (C); Ingvar Carlsson (S); Lennart Daléus (C); Inger Davidson (KDS); Chris Heister (M); Ulla Hoffmann (V); Gunnar Hökmark (M); Anita Johansson (S); Eva Johansson (S); Inger Koch (M); Lars Leijonborg (FP); Sören Lekberg (S); Göran Lennmarker (M); Gudrun Lindvall (MP); Jerry Martinger (M); Carina Moberg (S); Margareta Eckersten Nordenvall (M); Pär Nuder (S); Mats Odell (KDS); Thage G. Peterson (S); Christina Pettersson (S); Ola Rask (S); Fredrik Reinfeldt (M); Stig Rindborg (M); Marianne Samuelsson (MP); Jan Sandberg (M); Pierre Schori (S); Gudrun Schyman (V); Ingela Thalén (S); Lars Tobisson (M); Ines Uusmann (S); Tommy Waidelich (S); Bengt Westerberg (FP); Anne Wibble (FP); and Christina Zedell (S).

Permanent substitutions:

- Bengt Westerberg (FP) resigned on 31 December 1994 and was replaced by Karin Pilsäter (FP) on 1 January 1995.
- Jan Sandberg (M) resigned on 2 October 1995 and was replaced by Marietta de Pourbaix-Lundin (M) on 3 October 1995.
- Tommy Waidelich (S) resigned on 8 October 1995 and was replaced by Björn von Sydow (S) on 9 October 1995.
- Ingvar Carlsson (S) resigned on 22 March 1996 and was replaced by Eva Arvidsson (S) on 23 March 1996.
- Christina Zedell (S) resigned on 30 September 1996 and was replaced by Dag Ericson (S) on 1 October 1996.
- Margareta Eckersten Nordenvall (M) resigned on 21 September 1997 and was replaced by Catharina Elmsäter-Svärd (M) on 22 September 1997.
- Anne Wibble (FP) resigned on 1 December 1997 and was replaced by Carl B. Hamilton (FP) on the same day.

===== 1991 =====
Results of the 1991 general election held on 15 September 1991:

Party		Votes	%	Seats		
Party		Votes	%	Con.	Lev.	Tot.
Moderate Party	M	185,968	32.10%	11	1	12
Swedish Social Democratic Party	S	173,268	29.91%	10	1	11
Liberal People's Party	FP	69,408	11.98%	4	1	5
New Democracy	NyD	47,045	8.12%	3	0	3
Christian Democratic Unity	KDS	29,548	5.10%	2	0	2
Centre Party	C	24,571	4.24%	1	1	2
Left Party	V	23,560	4.07%	1	1	2
Green Party	MP	22,833	3.94%	0	0	0
Other parties		3,055	0.53%	0	0	0
Valid votes		579,256	100.00%	32	5	37
Rejected votes		9,824	1.67%			
Total polled		589,080	87.57%			
Registered electors		672,729				

The following candidates were elected: Annika Åhnberg (V); Ylva Annerstedt (FP); Knut Billing (M); Görel Bohlin (M); John Bouvin (NyD); Ingvar Carlsson (S); Harriet Colliander (NyD); Lennart Daléus (C); Inger Davidson (KDS); Hans Göran Franck (S); Pär Granstedt (C); Chris Heister (M); Gunnar Hökmark (M); Anita Johansson (S); Eva Johansson (S); Inger Koch (M); Lars Leijonborg (FP); Sören Lekberg (S); Göran Lennmarker (M); Ulf Lönnqvist (S); Jerry Martinger (M); Mats Odell (KDS); Thage G. Peterson (S); Fredrik Reinfeldt (M); Stig Rindborg (M); Mona Sahlin (S); Jan Sandberg (M); Pierre Schori (S); Gudrun Schyman (V); Daniel Tarschys (FP); Ingela Thalén (S); Lars Tobisson (M); Ines Uusmann (S); Ian Wachtmeister (NyD); Alf Wennerfors (M); Bengt Westerberg (FP); and Anne Wibble (FP).

Permanent substitutions:

- Görel Bohlin (M) resigned on 9 January 1992 and was replaced by Lars Biörck (M) on 10 January 1992.
- Ulf Lönnqvist (S) resigned on 31 July 1992 and was replaced by Björn Ericson (S) on 1 August 1992.
- Ian Wachtmeister (NyD) resigned on 10 June 1994 and was replaced by Vivianne Franzén (NyD) on 11 June 1994.

==== 1980s ====
===== 1988 =====
Results of the 1988 general election held on 18 September 1988:

Party		Votes	%	Seats		
Party		Votes	%	Con.	Lev.	Tot.
Swedish Social Democratic Party	S	196,700	35.37%	12	1	13
Moderate Party	M	152,483	27.42%	9	1	10
Liberal People's Party	FP	89,048	16.01%	5	1	6
Left Party – Communists	VPK	35,440	6.37%	2	1	3
Centre Party	C	35,288	6.35%	2	0	2
Green Party	MP	33,269	5.98%	2	1	3
Christian Democratic Unity	KDS	9,891	1.78%	0	0	0
Other parties		3,966	0.71%	0	0	0
Valid votes		556,085	100.00%	32	5	37
Rejected votes		8,166	1.45%			
Total polled		564,251	86.26%			
Registered electors		654,150				

The following candidates were elected: Annika Åhnberg (VPK); Lennart Andersson (S); Ylva Annerstedt (FP); Knut Billing (M); Görel Bohlin (M); Ingvar Carlsson (S); Allan Ekström (M); Ingemar Eliasson (FP); Hans Göran Franck (S); Per Gahrton (MP); Ingela Gardner (M); Eva Goës (MP); Gunnar Hökmark (M); Anna Horn (MP); Anita Johansson (S); Eva Johansson (S); Olof Johansson (C); Inger Koch (M); Anna-Greta Leijon (S); Lars Leijonborg (FP); Sören Lekberg (S); Ulf Lönnqvist (S); Jerry Martinger (M); Ivar Nordberg (S); Thage G. Peterson (S); Mona Sahlin (S); Jan Sandberg (M); Gudrun Schyman (VPK); Karin Söder (C); Jan Strömdahl (VPK); Daniel Tarschys (FP); Ingela Thalén (S); Lars Tobisson (M); Alf Wennerfors (M); Bengt Westerberg (FP); Aina Westin (S); and Anne Wibble (FP).

Permanent substitutions:

- Ingela Gardner (M) resigned on 10 January 1989 and was replaced by Birgitta Rydle (M) on 11 January 1989.
- Anna-Greta Leijon (S) resigned on 13 June 1990 and was replaced by Lars Gustafsson (S) on 14 June 1990.
- Ingemar Eliasson (FP) resigned on 30 June 1990 and was replaced by Sören Norrby (FP) on 1 July 1990.
- Ivar Nordberg (S) resigned on 30 June 1990 and was replaced by Sylvia Pettersson (S) on 1 July 1990.

===== 1985 =====
Results of the 1985 general election held on 15 September 1985:

Party		Votes	%	Seats		
Party		Votes	%	Con.	Lev.	Tot.
Swedish Social Democratic Party	S	214,044	38.28%	12	2	14
Moderate Party	M	171,700	30.70%	10	1	11
Liberal People's Party	FP	96,061	17.18%	5	1	6
Left Party – Communists	VPK	32,947	5.89%	2	1	3
Centre Party	C	32,196	5.76%	2	0	2
Green Party	MP	9,078	1.62%	0	0	0
Other parties		3,182	0.57%	0	0	0
Valid votes		559,208	100.00%	31	5	36
Rejected votes		5,527	0.98%			
Total polled		564,735	90.51%			
Registered electors		623,957				

The following candidates were elected: Allan Åkerlind (M); Lennart Andersson (S); Ylva Annerstedt (FP); Knut Billing (M); Gunnar Biörck (M); Görel Bohlin (M); Staffan Burenstam Linder (M); Ingvar Carlsson (S); Tore Claeson (VPK); Allan Ekström (M); Ingemar Eliasson (FP); Hans Göran Franck (S); Tommy Franzén (VPK); Pär Granstedt (C); Lars Gustafsson (S); Gunnar Hökmark (M); Anita Johansson (S); Inga Lantz (VPK); Anna-Greta Leijon (S); Lars Leijonborg (FP); Sören Lekberg (S); Gunnel Liljegren (M); Ulf Lönnqvist (S); Ivar Nordberg (S); Thage G. Peterson (S); Sylvia Pettersson (S); Stig Rindborg (M); Birgitta Rydle (M); Mona Sahlin (S); Karin Söder (C); Daniel Tarschys (FP); Alf Wennerfors (M); Bengt Westerberg (FP); Aina Westin (S); and Anne Wibble (FP).

Permanent substitutions:

- Stig Rindborg (M) resigned on 31 December 1985 and was replaced by Jerry Martinger (M) on 1 January 1986.
- Allan Åkerlind (M) died on 7 April 1986 and was replaced by Ingela Gardner Sundström (M) on 10 April 1986.
- Staffan Burenstam Linder (M) resigned on 9 April 1986 and was replaced by Jan Sandberg (M) on 10 April 1986.
- Gunnar Biörck (M) resigned on 30 September 1987 and was replaced by Inger Koch (M) on 1 October 1987.

===== 1982 =====
Results of the 1982 general election held on 19 September 1982:

Party		Votes	%	Seats		
Party		Votes	%	Con.	Lev.	Tot.
Swedish Social Democratic Party	S	213,918	39.94%	12	2	14
Moderate Party	M	181,144	33.82%	11	1	12
Centre Party	C	54,654	10.20%	3	0	3
Left Party – Communists	VPK	35,497	6.63%	2	1	3
Liberal People's Party	FP	31,600	5.90%	2	0	2
Green Party	MP	11,726	2.19%	0	0	0
Christian Democratic Unity	KDS	5,676	1.06%	0	0	0
K-Party	K-P	322	0.06%	0	0	0
Other parties		1,066	0.20%	0	0	0
Valid votes		535,603	100.00%	30	4	34
Rejected votes		6,685	1.23%			
Total polled		542,288	92.12%			
Registered electors		588,700				

The following candidates were elected: Allan Åkerlind (M); Elis Andersson (C); Lennart Andersson (S); Kerstin Anér (FP); Lilly Bergander (S); Knut Billing (M); Gunnar Biörck (M); Görel Bohlin (M); Staffan Burenstam Linder (M); Ingvar Carlsson (S); Tore Claeson (VPK); Allan Ekström (M); Ingemar Eliasson (FP); Pär Granstedt (C); Lars Gustafsson (S); Gunnar Hökmark (M); Anita Johansson (S); Inga Lantz (VPK); Anna-Greta Leijon (S); Gunnel Liljegren (M); Britt Mogård (M); Gunnar Nilsson (S); Ivar Nordberg (S); Sture Palm (S); Margareta Palmqvist (S); Thage G. Peterson (S); Birgitta Rydle (M); Mona Sahlin (S); Karin Söder (C); Jan-Eric Virgin (M); Alf Wennerfors (M); Lars Werner (VPK); Aina Westin (S); and Åke Wictorsson (S).

Permanent substitutions:

- Britt Mogård (M) resigned on 31 January 1983 and was replaced by Lena Wallgren (M) on 1 February 1983.
- Åke Wictorsson (S) resigned on 28 February 1983 and was replaced by Sören Lekberg (S) on 1 March 1983.
- Lena Wallgren (M) died on 5 April 1983 and was replaced by Inger Koch (M) on 7 April 1983.

==== 1970s ====
===== 1979 =====
Results of the 1979 general election held on 16 September 1979:

Party		Votes	%	Seats		
Party		Votes	%	Con.	Lev.	Tot.
Swedish Social Democratic Party	S	192,980	37.82%	11	2	13
Moderate Party	M	144,543	28.33%	8	1	9
Centre Party	C	67,185	13.17%	4	0	4
Liberal People's Party	FP	61,030	11.96%	4	0	4
Left Party – Communists	VPK	36,743	7.20%	2	1	3
Christian Democratic Unity	KDS	4,111	0.81%	0	0	0
Communist Party of Sweden	SKP	1,631	0.32%	0	0	0
Workers' Party – The Communists	APK	635	0.12%	0	0	0
Other parties		1,352	0.26%	0	0	0
Valid votes		510,210	100.00%	29	4	33
Rejected votes		4,097	0.80%			
Total polled		514,307	91.15%			
Registered electors		564,237				

The following candidates were elected: Allan Åkerlind (M); Elis Andersson (C); Lennart Andersson (S); Kerstin Anér (FP); Lilly Bergander (S); Knut Billing (M); Gunnar Biörck (M); Staffan Burenstam Linder (M); Ingvar Carlsson (S); Tore Claeson (VPK); Georg Danell (M); Pär Granstedt (C); Lars Gustafsson (S); Anita Johansson (S); Inga Lantz (VPK); Anna-Greta Leijon (S); Gunnel Liljegren (M); Essen Lindahl (S); Britt Mogård (M); Ingemar Mundebo (FP); Gunnar Nilsson (S); Ivar Nordberg (S); Elvy Olsson (C); Sture Palm (S); Margareta Palmqvist (S); Thage G. Peterson (S); Gabriel Romanus (FP); Birgitta Rydle (M); Karin Söder (C); Marianne Wahlberg (FP); Alf Wennerfors (M); Lars Werner (VPK); and Åke Wictorsson (S).

Permanent substitutions:

- Ingemar Mundebo (FP) resigned in 1980 and was replaced by Daniel Tarschys (FP) in October 1980.
- Elvy Olsson (C) resigned on 9 November 1980 and was replaced by Stina Andersson (C) on 10 November 1980.
- Georg Danell (M) resigned on 31 October 1981 and was replaced by Görel Bohlin (M) on 1 November 1981.

===== 1976 =====
Results of the 1976 general election held on 19 September 1976:

Party		Votes	%	Seats		
Party		Votes	%	Con.	Lev.	Tot.
Swedish Social Democratic Party	S	184,948	37.35%	11	1	12
Moderate Party	M	110,671	22.35%	6	1	7
Centre Party	C	96,243	19.43%	5	1	6
People's Party	F	66,357	13.40%	4	1	5
Left Party – Communists	VPK	30,613	6.18%	2	1	3
Christian Democratic Unity	KDS	3,520	0.71%	0	0	0
Communist Party of Sweden	SKP	2,531	0.51%	0	0	0
Other parties		324	0.07%	0	0	0
Valid votes		495,207	100.00%	28	5	33
Rejected votes		2,160	0.43%			
Total polled		497,367	92.55%			
Registered electors		537,375				

The following candidates were elected: Allan Åkerlind (M); Elis Andersson (C); Lennart Andersson (S); Kerstin Anér (F); Lilly Bergander (S); Gunnar Biörck (M); Staffan Burenstam Linder (M); Ingvar Carlsson (S); Tore Claeson (VPK); Georg Danell (M); Pär Granstedt (C); Lars Gustafsson (S); Erik Johansson (C); Inga Lantz (VPK); Anna-Greta Leijon (S); Anna-Lisa Lewén-Eliasson (S); Essen Lindahl (S); Britt Mogård (M); Ingemar Mundebo (F); Gunnar Nilsson (S); Ivar Nordberg (S); Elvy Olsson (C); Sture Palm (S); Thage G. Peterson (S); Gabriel Romanus (F); Karin Söder (C); Karl-Erik Strömberg (F); Per Olof Sundman (C); Daniel Tarschys (F); Bertil af Ugglas (M); Alf Wennerfors (M); Lars Werner (VPK); and Åke Wictorsson (S).

Permanent substitutions:

- Bertil af Ugglas (M) died on 7 July 1977 and was replaced by Birgitta Rydle (M) in October 1977.

===== 1973 =====
Results of the 1973 general election held on 16 September 1973:

Party		Votes	%	Seats		
Party		Votes	%	Con.	Lev.	Tot.
Swedish Social Democratic Party	S	173,849	38.45%	10	2	12
Centre Party	C	100,558	22.24%	6	1	7
Moderate Party	M	91,781	20.30%	6	0	6
People's Party	F	47,050	10.41%	3	1	4
Left Party – Communists	VPK	30,820	6.82%	2	1	3
Christian Democratic Unity	KDS	4,547	1.01%	0	0	0
Communist Party of Sweden	SKP	3,075	0.68%	0	0	0
Communist League Marxist–Leninists (the revolutionaries)	KFML(r)	326	0.07%	0	0	0
Other parties		117	0.03%	0	0	0
Valid votes		452,123	100.00%	27	5	32
Rejected votes		1,073	0.24%			
Total polled		453,196	91.66%			
Registered electors		494,406				

The following candidates were elected: Allan Åkerlind (M); Elis Andersson (C); Lennart Andersson (S); Lilly Bergander (S); Staffan Burenstam Linder (M); Ingvar Carlsson (S); Tore Claeson (VPK); Georg Danell (M); Arne Geijer (S); Pär Granstedt (C); Lars Gustafsson (S); Erik Johansson (C); Gustaf Jonnergård (C); Inga Lantz (VPK); Anna-Greta Leijon (S); Anna-Lisa Lewén-Eliasson (S); Essen Lindahl (S); Britt Mogård (M); Ingemar Mundebo (F); Cecilia Nettelbrandt (F); Ivar Nordberg (S); Elvy Olsson (C); Sture Palm (S); Thage G. Peterson (S); Gabriel Romanus (F); Karin Söder (C); Karl-Erik Strömberg (F); Per Olof Sundman (C); Bertil af Ugglas (M); Alf Wennerfors (M); Lars Werner (VPK); and Åke Wictorsson (S).

===== 1970 =====
Results of the 1970 general election held on 20 September 1970:

Party		Votes	%	Seats		
Party		Votes	%	Con.	Lev.	Tot.
Swedish Social Democratic Party	S	166,549	42.26%	10	2	12
People's Party	F	77,737	19.72%	5	1	6
Centre Party	C	62,122	15.76%	4	0	4
Moderate Party	M	59,768	15.16%	4	0	4
Left Party – Communists	VPK	21,082	5.35%	1	1	2
Christian Democratic Unity	KDS	4,141	1.05%	0	0	0
Communist League Marxists-Leninists	KFML	2,645	0.67%	0	0	0
Other parties		82	0.02%	0	0	0
Valid votes		394,126	100.00%	24	4	28
Rejected votes		765	0.19%			
Total polled		394,891	89.20%			
Registered electors		442,700				

The following candidates were elected: Allan Åkerlind (M); Lennart Andersson (S); Lilly Bergander (S); Staffan Burenstam Linder (M); Ingvar Carlsson (S); Bror Engström (VPK); Arne Geijer (S); Erik Grebäck (C); Lars Gustafsson (S); Anna-Lisa Lewén-Eliasson (S); Essen Lindahl (S); Britt Mogård (M); Ingemar Mundebo (F); Cecilia Nettelbrandt (F); Ivar Nordberg (S); Sören Norrby (F); Elvy Olsson (C); Sture Palm (S); Thage G. Peterson (S); Gabriel Romanus (F); Karin Söder (C); Karl-Erik Strömberg (F); Per Olof Sundman (C); Alf Wennerfors (M); Lars Werner (VPK); Krister Wickman (S); Åke Wictorsson (S); and David Wirmark (F).

Permanent substitutions:

- Krister Wickman (S) resigned on 19 November 1973 and was replaced by Carl-Eric Lundgren (S) on 20 November 1973.
- Bror Engström (VPK) resigned on 13 October 1972 and was replaced by Tore Claeson (VPK) on the same day.
