= Elfström =

Elfström is a Swedish surname. Notable people with the surname include:

- John Elfström (1902–1981), Swedish actor
- Mattias Elfström (born 1997), Swedish ice hockey player
- Rasmus Elfström (born 1997), Swedish politician
- Sten Elfström (born 1942), Swedish actor
