= Josefin Malmqvist =

Swedish politician (born 1987)

Member of the Riksdag
- Incumbent
- Assumed office 24 September 2018
- Constituency: Stockholm County

Personal details
- Born: 1987 (age 38–39)
- Party: Moderate Party

Josefin Malmqvist (born 1987) is a Swedish politician. Since September 2018, she serves as Member of the Riksdag representing the constituency of Stockholm County. She was also elected as Member of the Riksdag in September 2022. She is affiliated with the Moderate Party.
