= Andrea Kronvall =

Swedish politician (born 1985)

- Kronvall in 2026

Member of the Riksdag
- Incumbent
- Assumed office 28 September 2026
- Constituency: Stockholm County

Personal details
- Born: 31 July 1985 (age 41)
- Party: Sweden Democrats (since 2015)

Andrea Elin Maria Kronvall (born 31 July 1985) is a Swedish politician who was elected member of the Riksdag in 2026. She has served as group leader of the Sweden Democrats in the municipal council of Norrtälje since 2018.
