= Beatrice Timgren =

Swedish politician (born 1989)

Beatrice Rugland Timgren
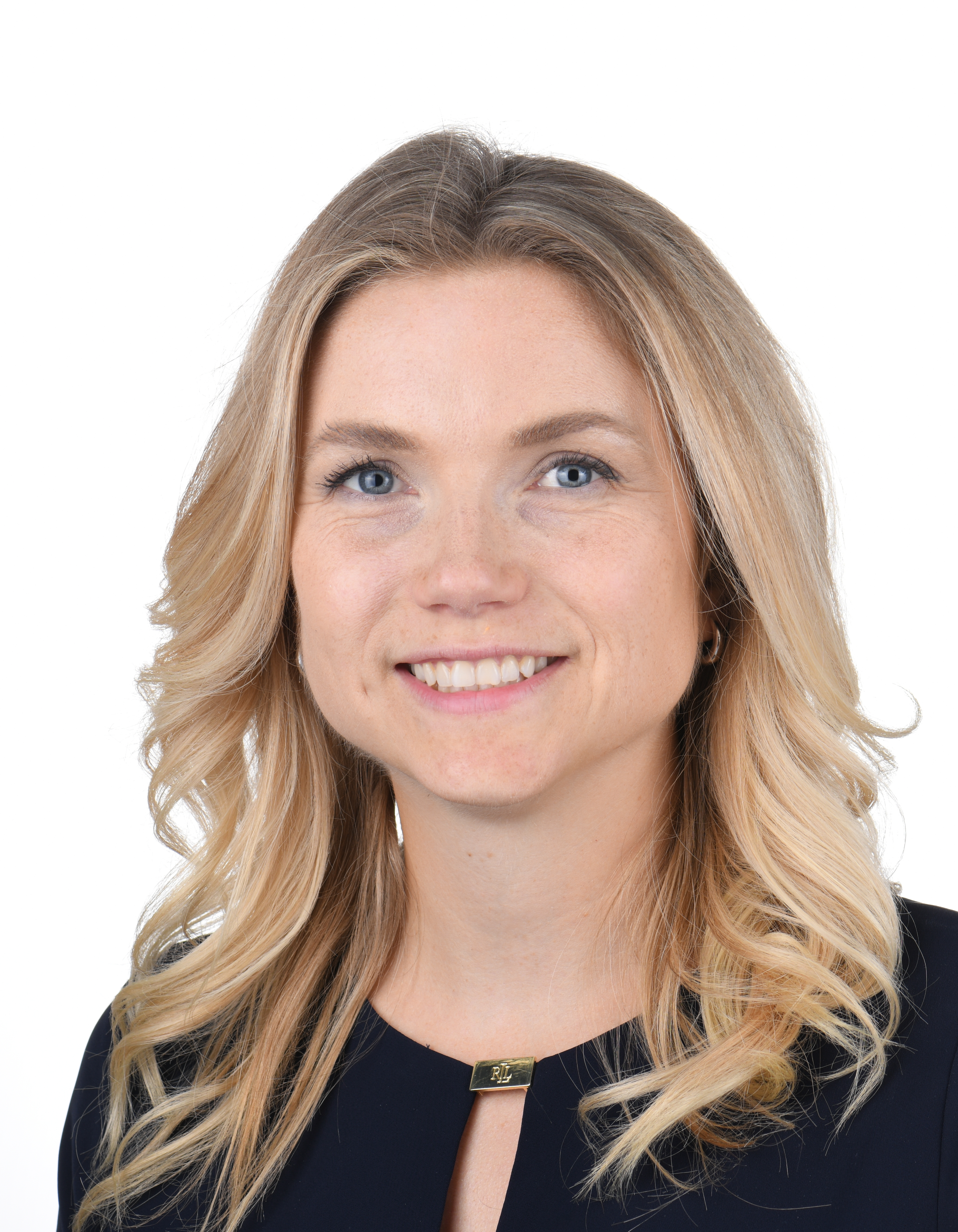

Member of the European Parliament
- Incumbent
- Assumed office 16 July 2024
- Constituency: Sweden

Member of the Riksdag
- In office 26 September 2022 – 15 July 2024
- Constituency: Stockholm County

Personal details
- Born: 12 May 1989 (age 37) Järfälla, Sweden
- Party: Sweden Democrats (2018-)
- Other political affiliations: Moderate Party (until 2018)
- Education: KTH Royal Institute of Technology
- Occupation: Engineer

Beatrice Rugland Timgren (born 12 May 1989) is a Swedish politician of the Sweden Democrats. She is a Member of European Parliament for Sweden since July 2024, having been elected in the 2024 European election.

She was a member of the Riksdag from 2022 to 2024, representing Stockholm County.

== Biography ==
Timgren was born in Järfälla and grew up in Stockholm and graduated with a degree in engineering from the KTH Royal Institute of Technology. She then worked as an engineering technician and a manager in the automotive industry. She currently resides in Ekerö with her husband and three children.

She was previously a member of the Moderate Party and sympathized with the Christian Democrats for a period before joining the Sweden Democrats in 2018, citing her concerns on terrorism, illegal immigration and gang activity in Sweden and Europe. She unsuccessfully stood for the SD during the 2019 European Parliament election. She has also served as a county councilor and an executive on the local party committee for the SD in Ekerö. For the 2022 Swedish general election, she contested the Riksdag constituency list of Stockholm County and was successful at winning a seat.

== See also ==
- List of members of the Riksdag, 2022–2026
