= Eva Johansson (politician) =

Swedish politician (born 1947)

Eva Johansson S

Member of the Swedish Parliament for Stockholm County
- In office 1985–2002

Personal details
- Born: Eva Margareta Johansson; 18 April 1947 (age 79) Karlskoga
- Party: Social Democrat
- Profession: Politician

Eva Margareta Johansson (born 18 April 1947 in Karlskoga) is a Swedish politician from the Swedish Social Democratic Party who between 1985 (ordinary from 1988) and 2002 was a member of the Riksdag for the Stockholm County constituency.

== See also ==
- List of former members of the Riksdag
