= Alexandra Anstrell =

Swedish politician (born 1974)

Member of the Riksdag
- Incumbent
- Assumed office 2014
- Constituency: Stockholm County

Personal details
- Born: Anna Maria Alexandra Anstrell; 18 December 1974 (age 51)
- Party: Moderate Party

Anna Maria Alexandra Anstrell (born 18 December 1974) is a Swedish politician from the Moderate Party. Since 2018, she has been a member of the Riksdag for Stockholm County.

She was also elected as a Member of the Riksdag in September 2022.

== See also ==
- List of members of the Riksdag, 2022–2026
