= Cinnika Beiming =

Swedish politician (born 1972)

Member of the Riksdag
- In office 5 October 1998 – 2 October 2006
- Constituency: Stockholm County

Personal details
- Born: 1972 (age 53–54)
- Party: Social Democratic Party

Ann Cinnika Beiming (born 1972) is a Swedish politician and former member of the Riksdag, the national legislature. A member of the Social Democratic Party, she represented Stockholm County between October 1998 and October 2006. She was also a substitute member of the Riksdag for Pär Nuder between February 1997 and October 1998.
