= Mats Arkhem =

Swedish politician (born 1966)

Member of the Riksdag
- Incumbent
- Assumed office 26 September 2022
- Constituency: Stockholm County

Personal details
- Born: 1966 (age 59–60)
- Party: Sweden Democrats

Mats Arkhem (born 1966) is a Swedish politician. He was elected as Member of the Riksdag in September 2022. He represents the constituency of Stockholm County. He is affiliated with the Sweden Democrats.
