= Maria Stockhaus =

Swedish politician (born 1963)

Member of the Riksdag
- Incumbent
- Assumed office 2014
- Constituency: Stockholm County

Personal details
- Born: 15 May 1963 (age 63) Stockholm, Sweden
- Party: Moderate Party

Maria Viktoria Stockhaus (born 15 May 1963) is a Swedish politician from the Moderate Party who was elected a member of parliament for 2014, 2018 and 2022. She is a member of the Committee on Transport and Communications.

== See also ==
- List of members of the Riksdag, 2014–2018
- List of members of the Riksdag, 2018–2022
- List of members of the Riksdag, 2022–2026
- List of members of the Riksdag, 2026–2030
