= Anna Lasses =

Swedish politician (born 1977)

Member of the Riksdag
- Incumbent
- Assumed office 26 September 2022
- Constituency: Stockholm County

Personal details
- Born: 1977 (age 48–49)
- Party: Centre Party

Anna Lasses (born 1977) is a Swedish politician. Since September 2022, she serves as Member of the Riksdag representing the constituency of Stockholm County. She is affiliated with the Centre Party.
