= Leonid Yurkovskiy =

Swedish politician (born 1995)

Member of the Riksdag
- Incumbent
- Assumed office 26 September 2022
- Constituency: Stockholm County

Personal details
- Born: 22 November 1995 (age 30) Russia
- Party: Sweden Democrats

Leonid Yurkovskiy (born 22 November 1995) is a Swedish-Russian politician affiliated with the Sweden Democrats.

Yurkovskiy was born in Russia before moving to Sweden and states his emigrating from Russia to the West shaped his political outlook. He served as a municipal councilor for the SD in Stockholm. He was elected as Member of the Riksdag in September 2022. He represents the constituency of Stockholm County.
