= Katarina Berggren =

Swedish politician (born 1968)

Member of the Riksdag
- Incumbent
- Assumed office 28 September 2026
- Constituency: Stockholm County

Personal details
- Born: 1 June 1968 (age 58) Farsta, Stockholm, Sweden
- Party: Swedish Social Democratic Party
- Education: Stockholm University

Eva Katarina Berggren (born 1 June 1968) is a Swedish trade union ombudsman and politician from the Social Democratic Party. She has been a member of the Riksdag since 2026, elected for the constituency of Stockholm County. She was chairwoman of the municipal board of Botkyrka Municipality between 2004 and 2015.

== Early life and education ==
Katarina Berggren was born in Farsta in 1968. She studied at Stockholm University, where she graduated in administration in 1993.

== Political career ==
Katarina Berggren was the chairwoman of the municipal board in Botkyrka between 2004 and 2015. Notable achievements include the Cirkus Cirkör and the Subtopia cultural center which developed their operations in the municipality during these years.

After her time as chairwoman of the municipal board, Berggren became deputy party secretary for the Swedish Social Democratic Party, a position she held from January 2016. On 4 September 2017, she took up a new position at the trade union Kommunal, where she was appointed election leader for both the autumn 2017 church elections and for the union's election campaign for the 2018 parliamentary election. The assignment included the strategic responsibility for organizing and leading Kommunal's election work. Since then, Berggren has continued to be employed at Kommunal as a trade union-political ombudsman.

In the 2026 Swedish general election, she was elected to the Riksdag.

== Other activities ==
Katarina Berggren has been on AIK's board of directors since 2019, and on the board of the Social Democrats in Botkyrka Municipality.

== See also ==
- List of members of the Riksdag, 2026–2030
