= Ludvig Aspling =

Swedish politician

Member of the Riksdag
- Incumbent
- Assumed office 2018
- Constituency: Stockholm County

Personal details
- Born: 15 June 1983 (age 43) Sollentuna, Sweden
- Party: Sweden Democrats
- Education: Dalarna University; Stockholm University

Erik Oskar Ludvig Aspling is a Swedish politician who has been a member of the Riksdag for the Sweden Democrats party since 2018, representing the constituency of Stockholm County. Since 2021, he has served as the SD's spokesman on immigration and is the SD delegation leader for the social affairs committee in parliament.

== Biography ==
=== Early career ===
Aspling studied Mandarin and Japanese at Dalarna University and subsequently worked abroad as a teacher in Thailand and China. He then completed a law degree at Stockholm University. In 2015, he began working as a political secretary to the Sweden Democrats.

=== Political work ===
Aspling currently represents the Stockholm County constituency and holds seat 319. In the Riksdag he sits on the EU Committee and is a deputy on the parliamentary Committee on Foreign Affairs.

Aspling has spoken against EU legislation and proposals by Swedish Prime Minister Stefan Löven to roll out a common European minimum wage, arguing that the EU's legal structures are different to that of Sweden's social policies and that such a measure would undermine Sweden's ability to set its own wages. Along with Sweden Democrats MEP Charlie Weimers, Aspling has played a role in criticising the EU's common asylum and migration policies, claiming "there is no discussion of how to deal with the different fundamentally illiberal, dysfunctional and often anti-Western ideologies, beliefs and religions that accompanies many migrants to Europe." He also states that the EU needs to do more in addressing human trafficking across the Mediterranean. Aspling has also called on the Swedish government not to invest money in the Chinese Belt and Road Initiative (BRI), claiming that the BRI is a front for the Chinese state and that Sweden should not deal with the BRI on grounds of human rights abuses in China and that economic partnership with BRI will lead to unfair competition with European workers.
