= Adam Reuterskiöld =

Swedish politician (born 1966)

Member of the Riksdag
- Incumbent
- Assumed office 18 October 2022
- Preceded by: Niklas Wykman
- Constituency: Stockholm County

Personal details
- Born: 3 February 1966 (age 60)
- Party: Moderate Party

Adam Reuterskiöld (born 3 February 1966) is a Swedish politician serving as a member of the Riksdag since 2022. From 2015 to 2022, he served as mayor of Ekerö.
