= Ingela Nylund Watz =

Swedish politician (born 1962)

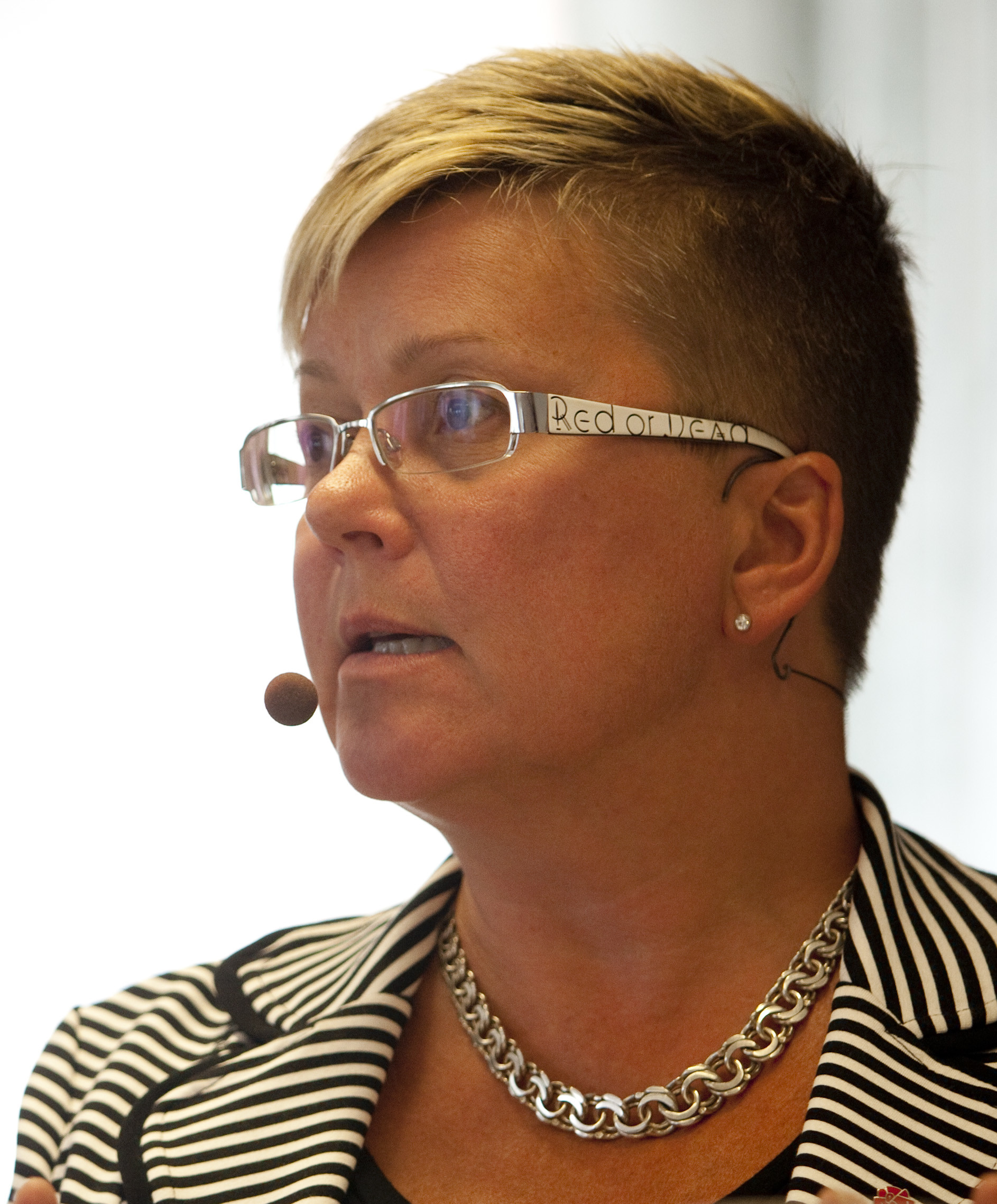
- Born: 1962 (age 63–64)
- Occupation: Politician
- Known for: Member of the Riksdag

Ingela Nylund Watz (born 1962) is a Swedish Social Democratic Party politician.

She was elected member of the Riksdag for the period 2010–2026, from the Stockholm County constituency.
