= Andrea Andersson-Tay =

Swedish politician (born 1988)

Member of the Riksdag
- Incumbent
- Assumed office 26 September 2022
- Constituency: Stockholm County

Personal details
- Born: 1988 (age 37–38)
- Party: Left Party

Andrea Andersson-Tay (born 1988) is a Swedish politician. She was elected as Member of the Riksdag in September 2022. She represents the constituency of Stockholm County. She is affiliated with the Left Party. She is the party's environmental policy spokesperson.
