= Sandra Sönnergren =

Swedish politician (born 1990)

Member of the Riksdag
- Incumbent
- Assumed office 28 September 2026
- Constituency: Stockholm County

Personal details
- Born: Sandra Elisabeth Lindström; 8 December 1990 (age 35)
- Party: Left Party

Sandra Elisabeth Sönnergren (née Lindström; born 8 December 1990) is a Swedish politician for the Left Party. She has been a member of the Riksdag since 2026, elected for the Stockholm County. Sönnergren was previously a municipal councillor in Solna and had been the library manager in Håbo Municipality since March 2026. From 2023 to 2026, she was the chairwoman of the culture and leisure committee and is also the Left Party's group leader in the municipal executive and municipal council in Solna. During the years 2018–2022, Sandra Sönnergren was an opposition councillor and group leader for the Left Party in Solna.

Sandra Sönnergren is the chairwoman of the Committee for Culture and Leisure at the Swedish Association of Local Authorities and Regions. She was also previously the first deputy in the regional council and deputy in the cultural committee in Region Stockholm.

Sandra Sönnergren is a trained folk high school teacher and has worked as a folk high school teacher on the general course at Jakobsbergs folkhögskola. She also has a master's degree in industrial economics.

== See also ==
- List of members of the Riksdag, 2026–2030
