= Inga Lantz =

Swedish politician (1943–2017)

- In office 3 October 1976 – 2 October 1988

Member of the Riksdag
- Constituency: Stockholm County

Personal details
- Born: 1 February 1943
- Died: 28 July 2017 (aged 74)
- Party: Left Party–Communists

Inga Lantz (1 February 1943 – 28 July 2017) was a Swedish politician. She served on the Riksdag from 1973 to 1988 as a member of the Left Party–Communists.
