= Eva Arvidsson =

Swedish politician (born 1948)

Member of the Riksdag
- In office 23 March 1996 – 2 October 2006
- Preceded by: Ingvar Carlsson
- Constituency: Stockholm County

Personal details
- Born: 1948 (age 77–78)
- Party: Social Democratic Party

Eva Birgitta Arvidsson (born 1948) is a Swedish politician and former member of the Riksdag, the national legislature. A member of the Social Democratic Party, she represented Stockholm County between March 1996 and October 2006. She was also a substitute member of the Riksdag for Ingela Thalén between October 1994 and March 1996.
