= Annika Hirvonen =

Swedish politician (born 1989)

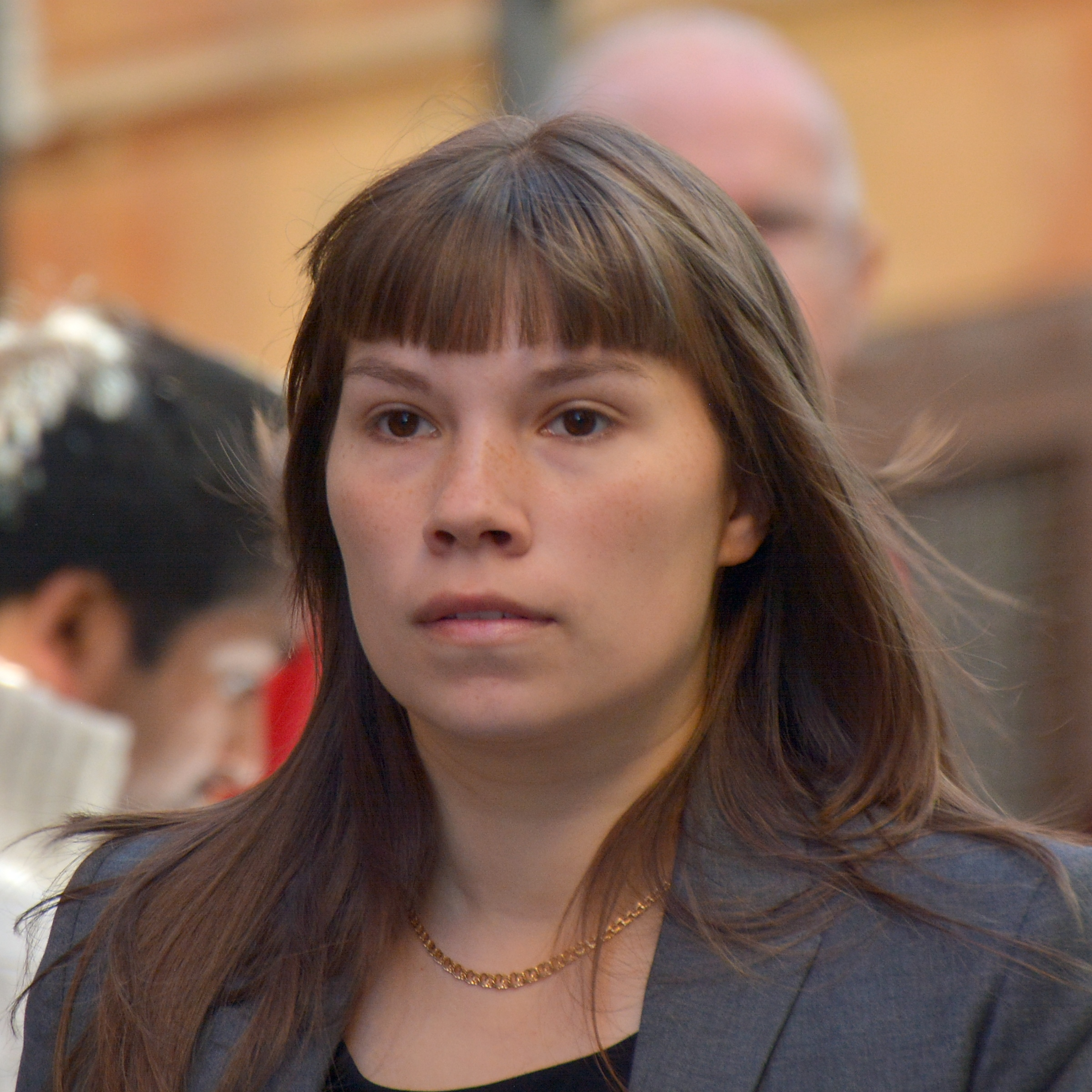
- Hirvonen in 2014

Member of the Riksdag
- Incumbent
- Assumed office 19 June 2019
- Constituency: Stockholm County

Member of the Riksdag
- In office 24 June 2014 – 24 September 2018
- Constituency: Stockholm County

Personal details
- Born: 2 June 1989 (age 37) Stockholm, Sweden
- Party: Green Party

Annika Hirvonen (born 2 June 1989) is a Swedish politician. She represents the constituency of Stockholm County in the Riksdag. She served as Member of the Riksdag from 24 June 2014 to 24 September 2018. She serves as Member of the Riksdag since 19 June 2019 after Alice Bah Kuhnke left to become Member of the European Parliament. She is affiliated with the Green Party.

Hirvonen was again elected as Member of the Riksdag in September 2022.
