= Louise Minnhagen =

Swedish politician (born 1969)

Member of the Riksdag
- Incumbent
- Assumed office 28 September 2026
- Constituency: Stockholm County

Personal details
- Born: 1969 (age 56–57) Sundelin, Stockholm County, Sweden
- Party: Liberals
- Education: Gävle University College; University of Skövde

Louise Minnhagen (born 1969) is a Swedish politician from the Liberals. She has been a serving deputy in the Riksdag since 2026, elected for the Stockholm County constituency.

== Education and professional life ==
Minnhagen trained as an air traffic controller at SATSA 1992–1994 and worked as an air traffic controller at the Swedish Civil Aviation Administration 1994–2001. She has since held several management and project management positions within Swedish air traffic control, including as a team manager at the Swedish Civil Aviation Administration and in operational support at NUAC. In 2019, she took up the position of manager of the Swedish Civil Aviation Administration's Remote Tower Centre Stockholm.

She studied management science at the Swedish Defence University in 2013 and took courses in decision and risk analysis at the University of Gävle and project management at the University of Skövde in 2012–2013.

== Political career ==
Minnhagen has been chairman of the Liberal Party in Bromma and the party's group leader in the Bromma district council. She has also been a member of the council's social delegation and a juror in the administrative court and district court.

In 2024 she moved to Rindö in Vaxholm Municipality. She is the chairwoman of the Liberal Party in Vaxholm and has held positions as a member of the urban planning committee and the climate and environment committee, as well as a substitute member of the committee for technology, leisure and culture.

She is also the chairwoman of Liberal Women in Stockholm County.

On 29 September 2026, Minnhagen began serving as a deputy member in the Riksdag for the Stockholm County constituency.

== See also ==
- List of members of the Riksdag, 2026–2030
