= Yusuf Aydin (politician) =

Swedish politician (born 1982)

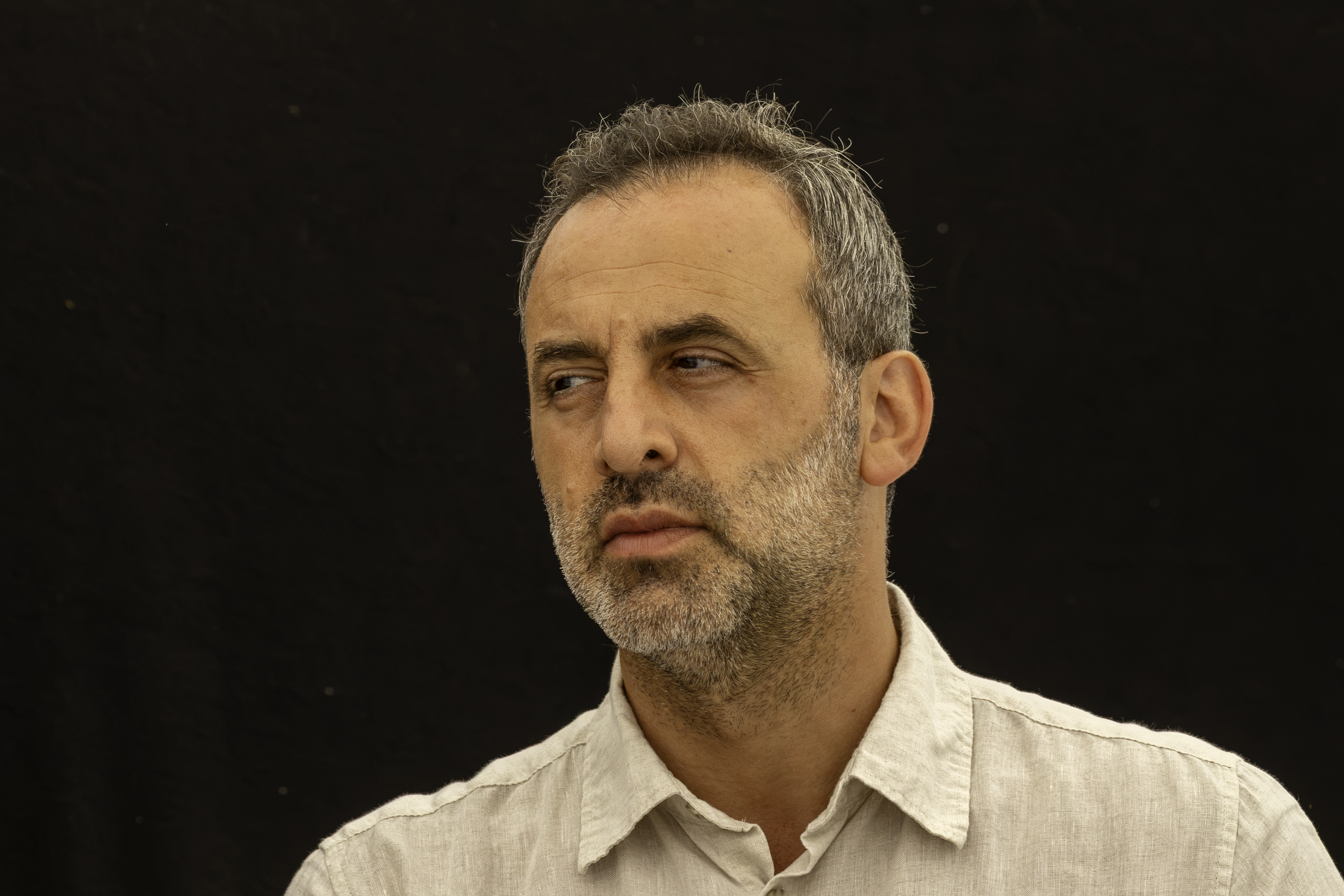

Member of the Riksdag
- Incumbent
- Assumed office 8 November 2022
- Preceded by: Jakob Forssmed
- Constituency: Stockholm County

Personal details
- Born: 19 February 1982 (age 44)
- Party: Christian Democrats

Yusuf Aydin (born 19 February 1982) is a Swedish politician serving as a member of the Riksdag since 2022. He has been a member of the municipal council of Botkyrka since 2014.
