= Leif Nysmed =

Swedish politician (born 1970)

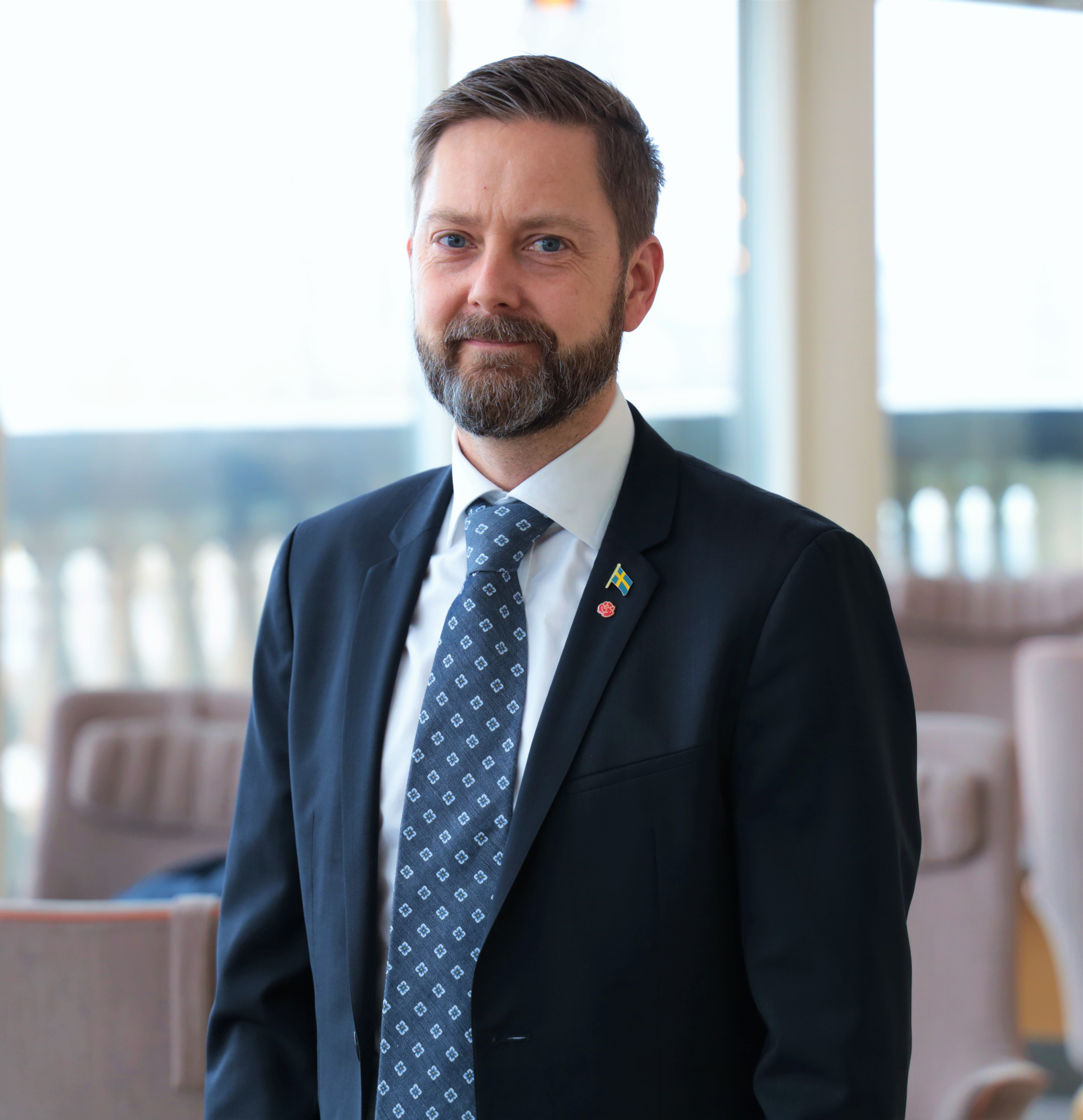
- Nysmed in February 2021

Member of the Riksdag
- Incumbent
- Assumed office 29 September 2014
- Constituency: Stockholm County

Personal details
- Born: 1970 (age 55–56)
- Party: Social Democratic Party

Leif Georg Nysmed (born 1970) is a Swedish politician and member of the Riksdag, the national legislature. A member of the Social Democratic Party, he has represented Stockholm County since September 2014.

Nysmed is the son of Jan Nyberg and Ann-Britt Nyberg Östergaard. He was educated in Långholmen.
