= Jonas Lindberg (politician) =

Swedish politician (born 1983)

Member of the Riksdag
- Incumbent
- Assumed office 28 September 2026
- Constituency: Stockholm County

Personal details
- Born: 1983 (age 42–43) Gothenburg, Sweden
- Party: Left Party

Jonas Lindberg (born 1983) is a Swedish nurse and politician for the Left Party. He has been a member of the Riksdag since 2026, elected for the Stockholm County constituency.

== Biography ==
Lindberg is a trained specialist nurse in intensive care. He has worked as a specialist nurse in intensive care at Karolinska University Hospital in Solna and in the emergency department at Södersjukhuset. He has also been a union representative in the Swedish Healthcare Federation (Vårdförbundet), including in emergency and intensive care and at Ersta Hospital.

=== Political career ===
Lindberg joined the Left Party and the Young Left in 1998 and has been a political representative for the Left Party since 2014.

He was a substitute member of the Stockholm County Council from 2015 to 2018 and became a full member in 2018. After the county council was transformed into the Region Stockholm, he continued as a member of the regional council.

After the 2022 elections, Lindberg became an opposition regional councillor in the Stockholm Region. He has been responsible for the Left Party's healthcare policy in the region and has been a member of the regional council and the health and medical care committee, as well as first vice-chairman of the primary care committee.

Lindberg was elected to the Left Party's board of directors in 2024. In February 2025, he was elected to the party's executive committee. At the Left Party's congress in Örebro in April 2026, he was re-elected to the party board.

In the 2026 Swedish general election, Lindberg ran for the Left Party in the Stockholm County constituency and was elected as a member of parliament for the 2026–2030 term.

== See also ==
- List of members of the Riksdag, 2026–2030
