= Emil Högberg =

Swedish politician (born 1976)

Member of the Riksdag
- Incumbent
- Assumed office 28 September 2026
- Constituency: Stockholm County

Personal details
- Born: 23 July 1976 (age 50) Stockholm, Sweden
- Party: Social Democratic Party
- Education: Stockholm University

Emil Tobias Högberg (born 23 July 1976) is a Swedish politician and Member of the Riksdag. A member of the Social Democratic Party, he has represented Stockholm County since September 2026.

Högberg was born on 23 July 1976 in Stockholm. He has a Master of Laws degree from Stockholm University (2001) and trained to be a lawyer. He has held various political and non-political roles in the Government Offices of Sweden and was a state secretary (statssekreterare) for five years. He was state secretary to government ministers Ibrahim Baylan (2017–2022) and Karl-Petter Thorwaldsson (2022).

Högberg has been an active member of the Social Democratic Party since 1995. He was a member of the municipal council and municipal commission (kommunalråd) in Huddinge. He was elected to the Riksdag at the 2026 general election.

Högberg is married to Erika Ullberg.
