= Knut Billing =

Swedish politician (1939–2007)

Knut Billing M

Member of the Swedish Parliament for Stockholm County
- In office 1 October 1979 – 30 September 2002

Member of the Swedish delegation to the Council of Europe
- In office 7 October 1993 – 31 December 2002

Personal details
- Born: 25 January 1939 Skellefteå, Västerbotten County, Sweden
- Died: 31 May 2007 (aged 68) Stockholm, Sweden
- Party: Moderate Party; Later Independent
- Profession: Politician

Knut Billing (15 January 1939 – 31 May 2007) was a Swedish politician, member of the Swedish Riksdag 1979–2002. He was a member of the Committee on Housing in 1983, and later in 1994 until 2002 as Speaker for the committee. He was also a member of the Swedish delegation to the Council of Europe from October 1993 until December 2002. He was also a member of Sweden's Nominating Committee from February 1992 until September 2002. During his time in the Riksdag, Billing was serving the constituency of Stockholm County.
