= Erik Ottoson =

Swedish politician (born 1989)

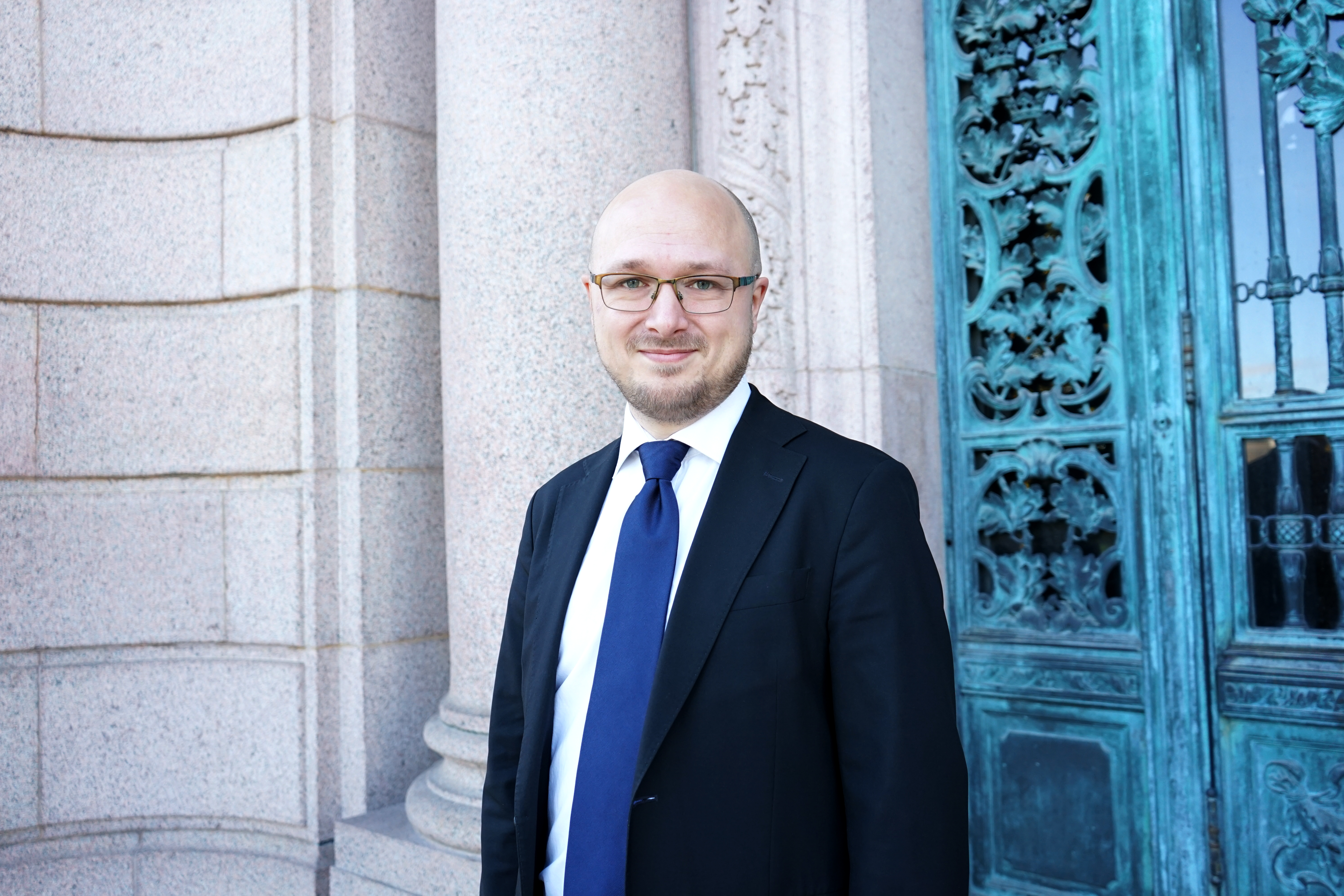
- Ottoson in 2022

Member of the Riksdag
- Incumbent
- Assumed office 20 January 2015
- Preceded by: Hillevi Engström
- Constituency: Stockholm County
- In office 29 September 2014 – 3 October 2014
- Succeeded by: Ewa Björling
- Constituency: Stockholm County

Personal details
- Born: 17 December 1989 (age 36)
- Party: Moderate Party

Erik Ottoson (born 17 December 1989) is a Swedish politician. He has been a member of the Riksdag since 2015, having previously served from September to October 2014. Since 2024, he has served as chairman of the Committee on European Union Affairs.
