= Sarkis Khatchadourian =

Swedish politician (born 1997)

Member of the Riksdag
- Incumbent
- Assumed office 28 September 2026
- Constituency: Stockholm County

Personal details
- Born: 4 September 1997 (age 29)
- Party: Social Democratic Party

Sarkis Johannes Khatchadourian (born 4 September 1997) is a Swedish politician who was elected member of the Riksdag in 2026. He has been a municipal councillor of Södertälje since 2020.
