= Catharina Hagen (politician) =

Swedish politician

Catharina Hagen S

Member of the Swedish Parliament for Stockholm County
- In office 1998–2002

Personal details
- Born: Barbro Catharina Bertilsson; 21 September 1948 (age 77) Stockholm County
- Party: Moderate Party
- Profession: Politician

Barbro Catharina Hagen (née Bertilsson; born 21 September 1948) is a Swedish economist and politician from the Moderate Party. She was a member of the Riksdag from 1998 to 2002, elected for the Stockholm County constituency.

In the Riksdag, she was a member of the Committee on Taxation from 1999 to 2002 (previously a deputy member of the committee from 1998) and a deputy member of the Committee on Finance from 1998 to 2002.
