= Lars Tobisson =

Swedish politician (born 1938)

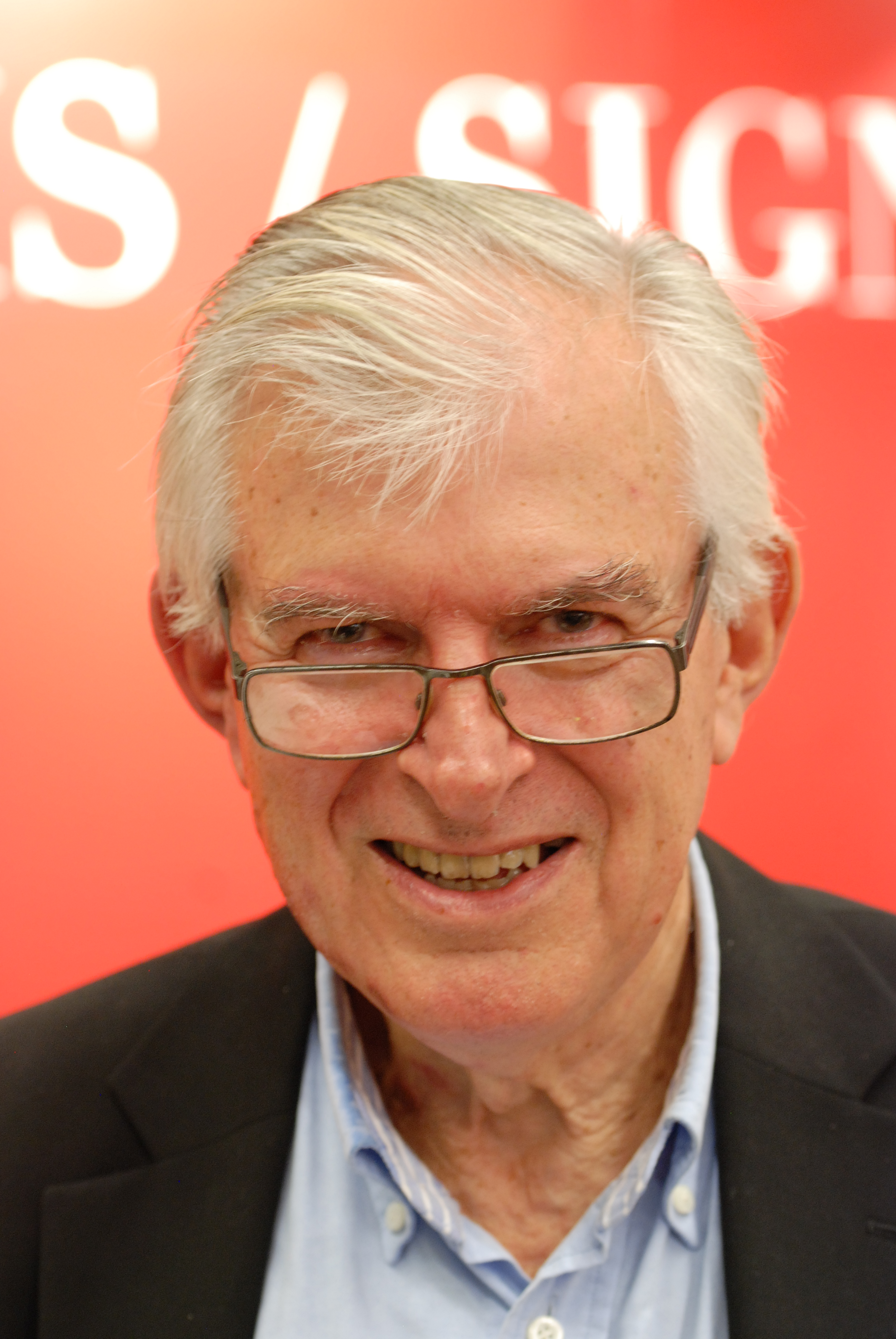
- Lars Tobisson in 2013

Party secretary of the Moderate Party
- In office 1974–1981
- Party chairman: Gösta Bohman
- Preceded by: Bertil af Ugglas
- Succeeded by: Georg Danell

Personal details
- Born: 19 November 1938 (age 87) Gothenburg, Sweden
- Party: Moderate

Lars Tobisson (born 19 November 1938) is a Swedish former Moderate politician.

Tobisson was a Member of Parliament in Sweden from 1979 to 2001 also serving as leader of the Finance Committee. From 1974 to 1981, he was Party Secretary within the Moderate Party and from 1981 to 1999 he served as Deputy Party Leader. When Moderate Party was in Government between 1991 and 1994 he was also leader of the Moderate Party in the Riksdag. Tobisson has a background as a military in the Swedish Army, earning the degree of Captain in 1972.
