= Marietta de Pourbaix-Lundin =

Swedish politician (born 1951)

Marietta de Pourbaix-Lundin (born 1951) is a Swedish politician of the Moderate Party, member of the Riksdag since 1995.

As member of the Parliamentary Assembly of the Council of Europe (PACE) from 2007 to 2014, De Pourbaix-Lundin served as co-rapporteur on the honouring of obligations and commitments by Ukraine. In late September 2014, she and fellow parliamentarian Mailis Reps of Estonia assessed the reform agenda initiated by President Petro Poroshenko of Ukraine, reviewed the state of the armed insurgency in the east of Ukraine, and evaluated ethnic tensions in Odesa following the fire of 2 May.

In 2015, news media reported that Pourbaix-Lundin was included in a Russian blacklist of prominent people from the European Union who are not allowed to enter the country.
