= Christina Zedell =

Swedish politician (born 1960)

Christina Zedell (born 1960) is a Swedish social democratic politician and ombudsman. She has been a member of the Riksdag since 2006. Among the assignments Zendell has had within the Riksdag are commissioner of Committee on Cultural Affairs between 2010 and 2014.
