= Helena Bargholtz =

Swedish politician (born 1942)

Helena Bargholtz (born 1942 in Lidingö, Stockholm County) is a Swedish Liberal People's Party politician. She was a member of the Riksdag from 1998 to 2006, and from 2009 onwards, although she threatened to leave her party over the controversy of the prostitution laws started by fellow Liberal MP Camilla Lindberg. She was the Chair of the Liberal women in 1997–2006.
