= Fredrik Lindahl (politician) =

Swedish politician (born 1987)

Member of the Riksdag
- Incumbent
- Assumed office 2018
- Constituency: Stockholm County

Personal details
- Born: 22 May 1987 (age 39) Täby, Sweden
- Party: Sweden Democrats

Fredrik Lindahl (born 22 May 1987) is a Swedish politician of the Sweden Democrats party who has been a member of the Riksdag since 2018.

Lindahl represents the constituency of Stockholm County and holds seat number 321 in parliament. He is a member of the Constitution Committee and a deputy for the Riksdag's Council for the National Audit Office. Lindahl has also been the district chairman in Stockholm County for the Sweden Democrats.
