= Anti Avsan =

Swedish politician (born 1958)

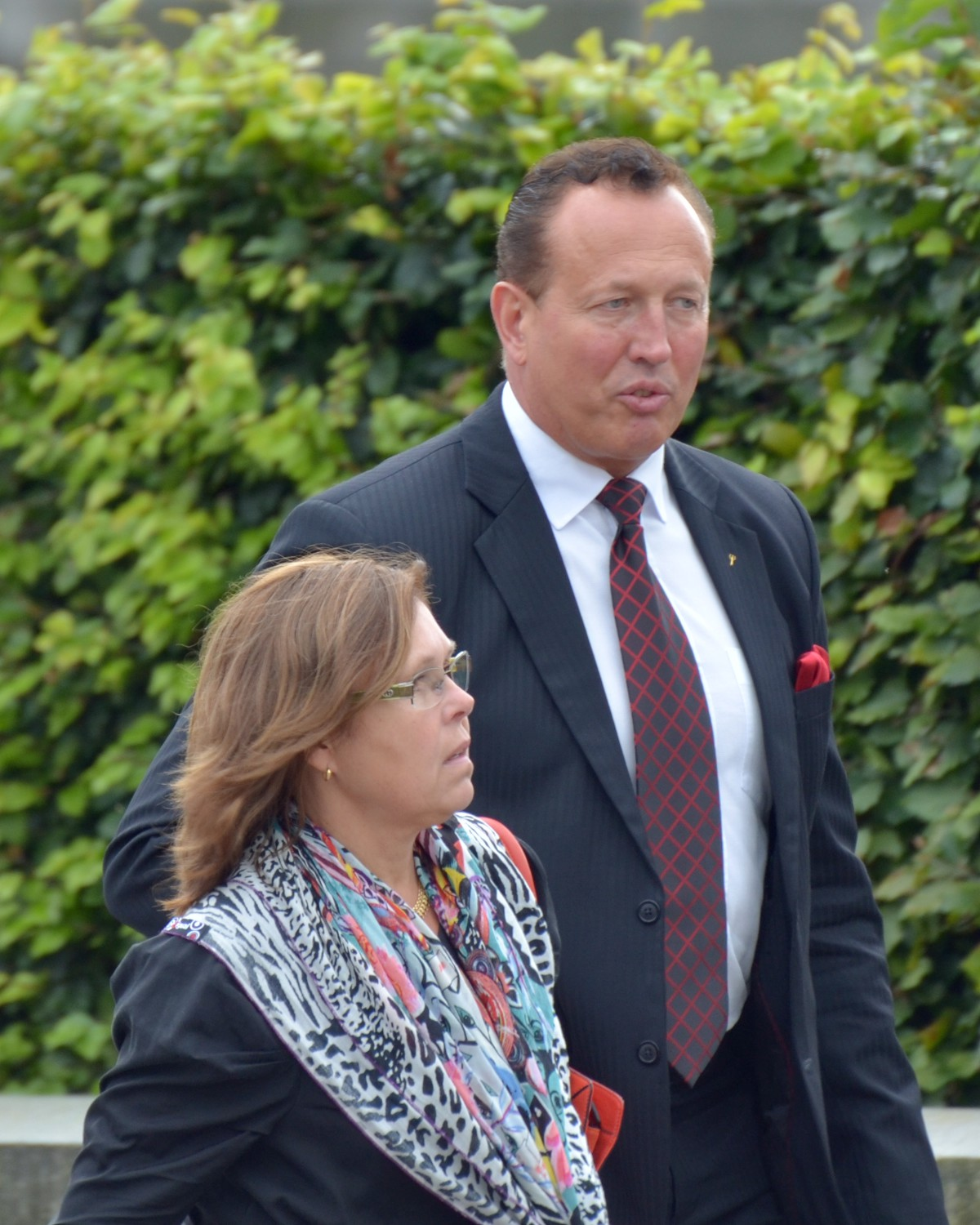
Anti Avsan with his wife Ellinor Avsan.

Anti Avsan (born 1958) is a Swedish politician of the Moderate Party. He was member of the Riksdag from 2006 to 2018.

Avsan is a former policeman. Due to his political engagements he is on leave from his current job as a judge in Stockholm.
