= Gudrun Lindvall =

Swedish politician and schoolteacher

- Born: 1948 (age 77–78)
- Occupations: Politician and schoolteacher
- Known for: Member of the Riksdag

Gudrun Lindvall (born 14 August 1948) is a Swedish Green Party politician and schoolteacher. She served as a member of the Riksdag from 1994 to 2002.

While serving in the Riksdag, she was a member of the Committee on Taxation, the Committee on the Constitution, the Committee on Environment and Agriculture, the Committee on Civil-Law Legislation, and the Committee on Finance.
