= Göran Pettersson =

Swedish politician

Göran Pettersson at the Gothenburg Book Fair 2011.

Göran Pettersson (born 1960) is a Swedish politician of the Moderate Party. He is a former officer of the Swedish army, with the rank of lieutenant-colonel, and was member of the Riksdag from 2006 to 2018.

== Education and career ==
Born in Stockholm, Sweden, Gören Pettersson graduated from the Swedish Military Academy, the Swedish Army's General staff and War College, and holds a Master of Science in Electronic Warfare from the United States Naval Postgraduate School. His most recent active duty position in the Armed Forces is general staff officer and military assistant to the Supreme Commander.

He is a fellow of the Royal Swedish Academy of War Sciences, was a member of Sveriges Riksdag (the Swedish Parliament) for the Moderate Party since 2006 part of the Committee on Finance, the Swedish government disciplinary and offence Board, and the Parliamentary board of the Swedish National Audit Office.] He is also the leader of the Swedish-American Parliamentary network in the Swedish Parliament and of the network on OECD in the Swedish Parliament.
