= Lars Ångström =

Swedish politician (born 1955)

Lars Ångström (born March 30, 1955) is a Swedish Green Party politician, member of the Riksdag 1998–2006.

Lars Ångström was president of the Swedish Peace and Arbitration Society 1985–1995, and head of the Swedish Greenpeace organisation 1995–1996.

== See also ==
- Politics of Sweden
