= Gunnar Andrén =

Swedish politician (born 1946)

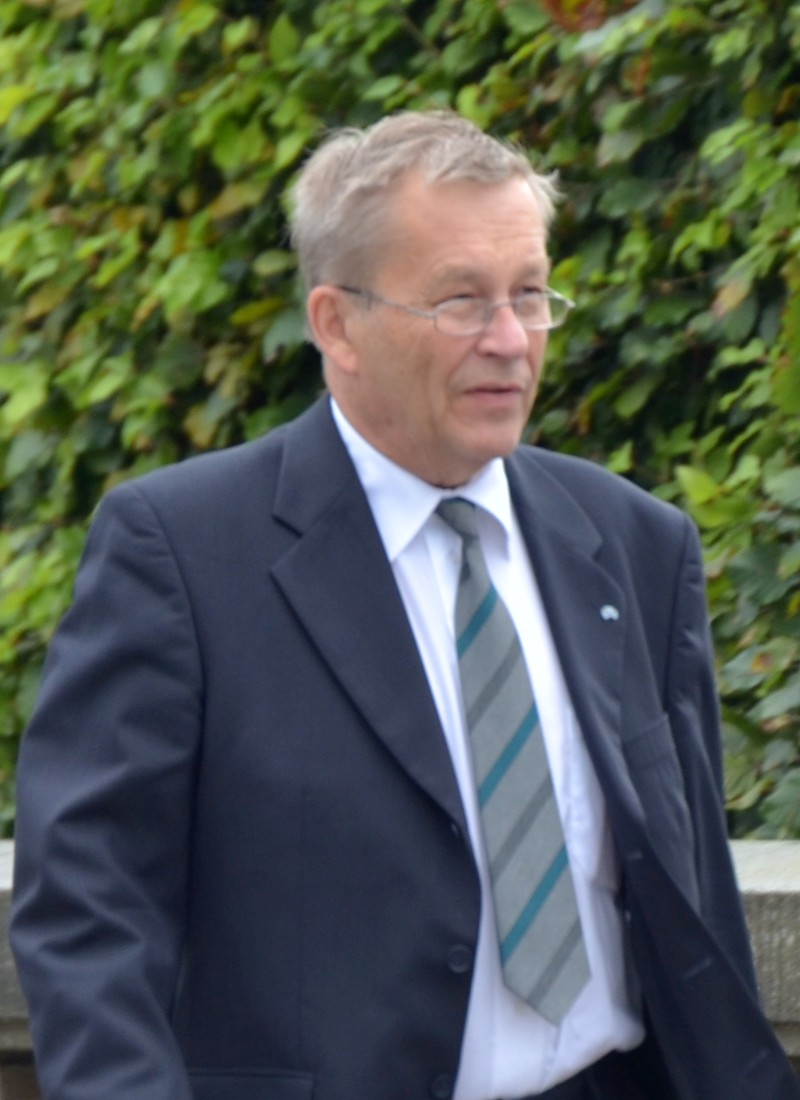
Gunnar Andrén

Gunnar Andrén (born 9 January 1946, in Eksjö), is a Swedish Liberal People's Party politician, and a member of the Riksdag since 2002.
