= Ola Rask =

Swedish politician (1940–2023)

Ola Rask (20 June 1940 – 30 August 2023) was a Swedish Social Democratic Party politician who was a member of the Riksdag between 1994 and 2006. Rask died on 30 August 2023, at the age of 83.
