= Yilmaz Kerimo =

Swedish politician (born 1963)

Member of the Riksdag
- In office 1998–2018

Personal details
- Born: 1962
- Political party: Swedish Social Democratic Party

Yilmaz Kerimo (born 1963) is a Swedish-Assyrian member of the Riksdag (the Swedish Parliament) and a member of the Swedish Social Democratic Party. He was first elected in the Swedish parliament in 1998 and was re-elected in 2006.
