= Ingvar Svensson (politician) =

Swedish politician (born 1944)

Ingvar Svensson (born 1944) is a Swedish Christian democratic politician, member of the Riksdag since 1998.
