= Nina Lundström =

Swedish politician (born 1961)

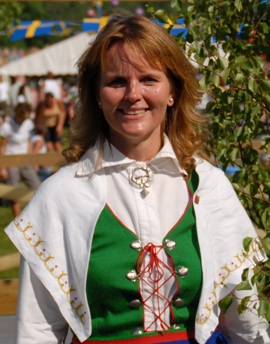
Nina Lundström

Nina Lundström (born 26 October 1961) is a Swedish Liberal People's Party politician of Finnish origin. Born in Savonlinna, Finland, she was a member of the Riksdag from 2002 to 2006. From 2006 she is a municipal commissioner in Sundbyberg Municipality.
