= Pär Granstedt =

Swedish politician (born 1945)

Pär Granstedt (born 1945) is a Swedish politician and former member of the Parliament of Sweden for the Centre Party from 1973 to 1994. He is a founding member of AWEPA, Association of European Parliamentarians with Africa. He has served the organization since the foundation as member of the Executive and Council, Vice President and Treasurer and was elected its Secretary General in December 2006. He is currently a member of the AWEPA Governing Council.

He was born in Stockholm 1945 and is educated at the Stockholm University (Masters, Political Science). He was elected member of the Swedish Parliament 1973. He remained a member of parliament until 1994 and served i. a. as vice chairman of the standing committees for Education and for Foreign Affairs, as chairman of the Parliamentary OSCE-delegation and as member of the Parliamentary Assembly of the Council of Europe. 1995-1999 he was advisor to the Swedish Government on security policy and international relations. 1999-2005 he worked as Director and Political Advisor for the Federation of Swedish Farmers. He was Vice President of the World Federation of UN Associations 1995-2000.

Mr Granstedt has also published a number of books and articles on international relations, sustainable development and democracy.
