= Elvy Olsson =

Swedish politician (1923–2022)

Elvy Olsson (1923-2022) was a Swedish politician of the Centre Party.

She was MP of the Parliament of Sweden in 1964–1980.

She served as Minister for Housing in 1976–1979.

She served as County Governor of Örebro County in 1980-1989.
