= Gunnar Nilsson (trade unionist) =

Swedish trade unionist (1922–1997)

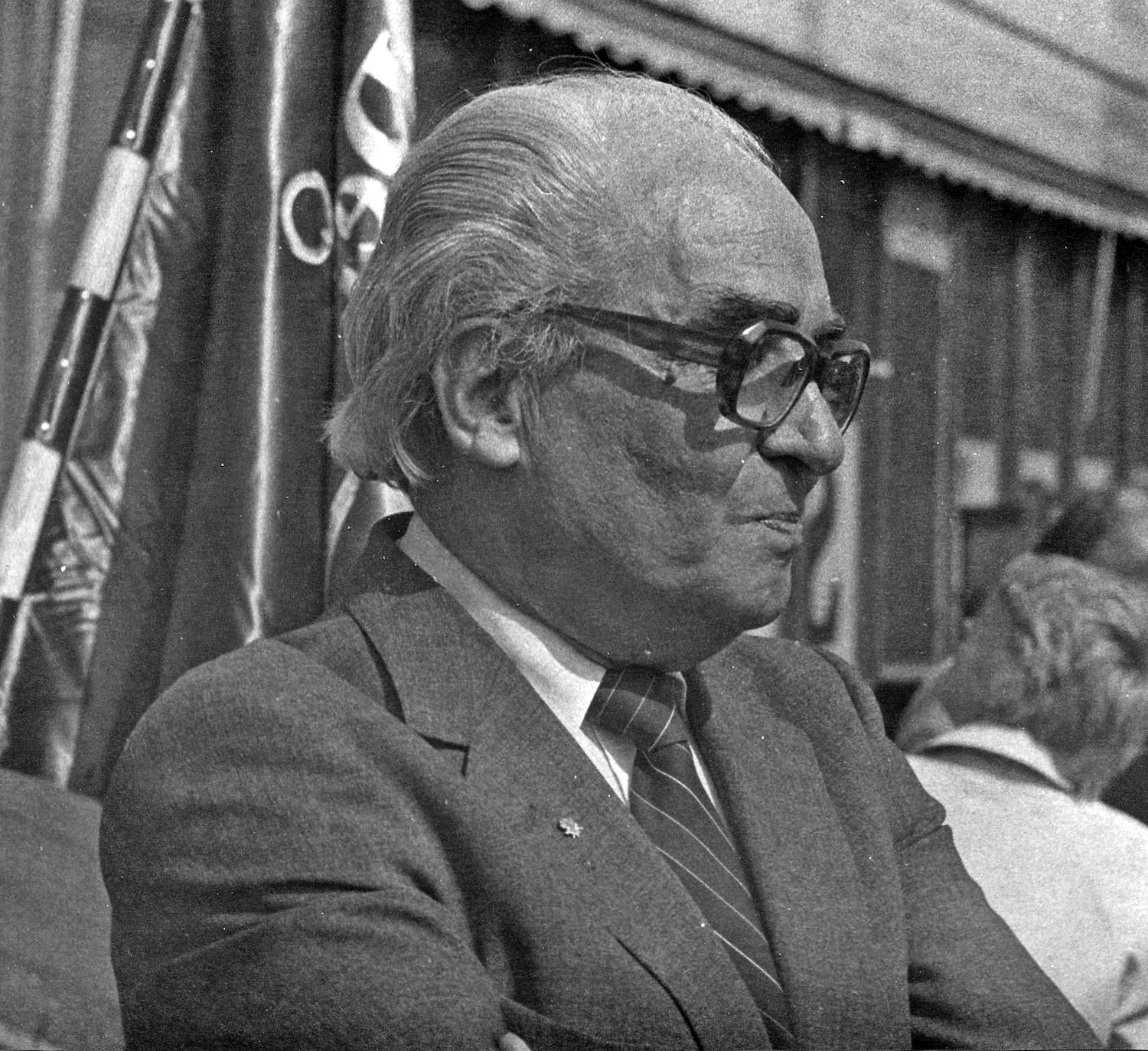
- Gunnar Nilsson in Örebro, Sweden on 1 May Day 1984
- Born: Gunnar Erling Nilsson; 31 December 1922; Mönsterås, Småland, Sweden
- Died: 13 May 1997 (aged 74); Stockholm, Sweden

Gunnar Erling Nilsson (1922–1997) was a Swedish trade union organiser. Originally a glass-blower by profession, he belonged to the Swedish Wood Industry Workers' Union. Nilsson was the chairman of the Swedish Trade Union Confederation 1973–1983.
