= Rasmus Elfström =

Swedish politician (born 1997)

- Elfström in 2022

Member of the Riksdag
- Incumbent
- Assumed office 28 September 2026
- Constituency: Stockholm County

Personal details
- Born: 8 January 1997 (age 29)
- Party: Centre Party

Rasmus Erik Johan Elfström (born 8 January 1997) is a Swedish politician who was elected member of the Riksdag in 2026. He has served as chairman of Centerstudenter since 2023.
