= Anita Johansson (politician) =

Swedish politician (born 1944)

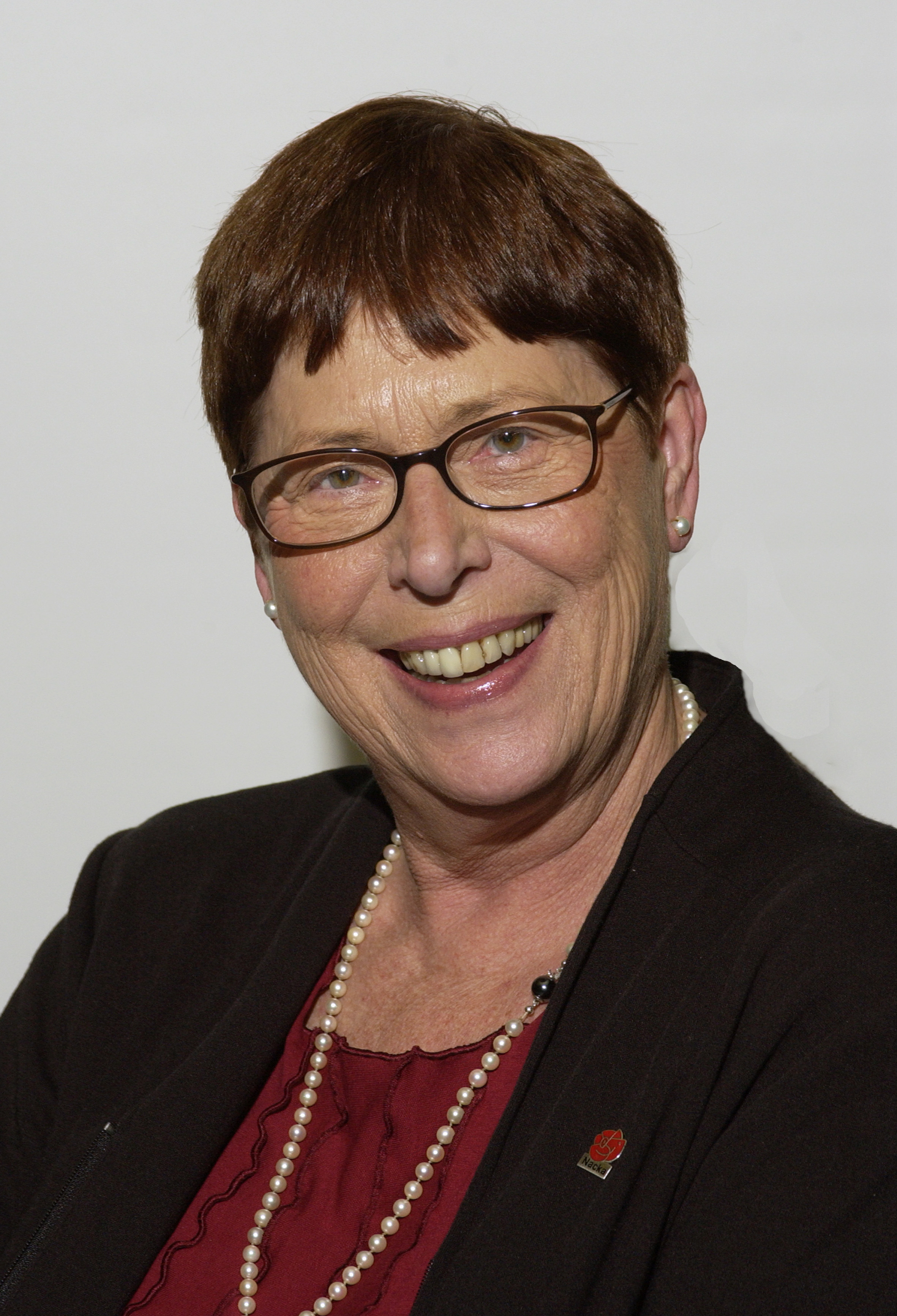
Anita Johansson

Anita Johansson, born 1944, is a Swedish social democratic politician. She was a member of the Riksdag from 1979 to 2006.
