= Tommy Waidelich =

Swedish politician (born 1963)

Tommy Waidelich (born 13 September 1963, in Stockholm) is a Swedish former social democratic politician.

He has studied economics (nationalekonomi) and geography (kulturgeografi) at Stockholm University. He was a member of the Riksdag from 1994 to 2014, with an exception for 1995-1998 when he was a member of the European Parliament.

The newly elected party chairman Håkan Juholt on 29 March 2011 appointed Waidelich as the party's spokesperson on economic politics, succeeding Thomas Östros in that role. He was succeeded by Magdalena Andersson in February 2012.
