= Mats Gerdau =

Swedish politician

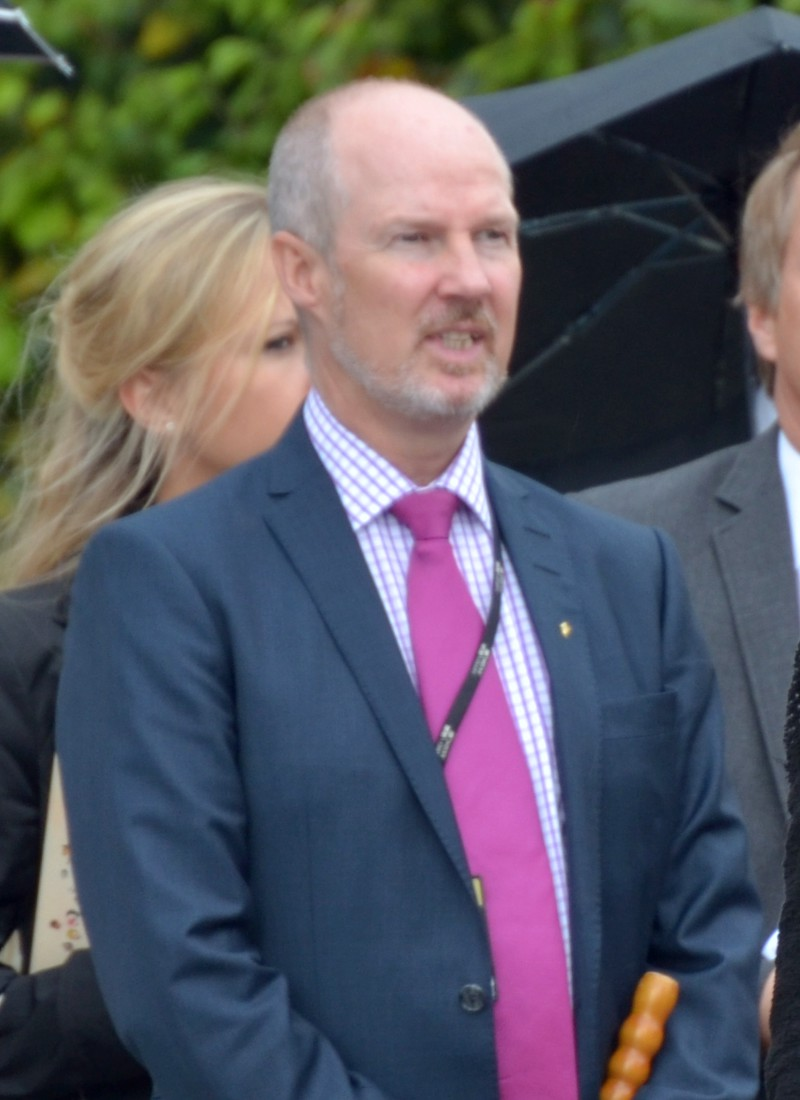
Mats Gerdau

Mats Gerdau (born 1964), is a Swedish politician of the Moderate Party. He was a member of the Riksdag from 2006 to 2012 and has been Mayor of Nacka Municipality since then.
