= Maryam Yazdanfar =

Swedish politician (born 1980)

Maryam Yazdanfar (Persian: مریم یزدانفر; born 1980) is an Iranian-Swedish social democratic politician. She was a member of the Riksdag from 2006 to 2013.
