= Gunnar Biörck =

Swedish politician (1916–1996)

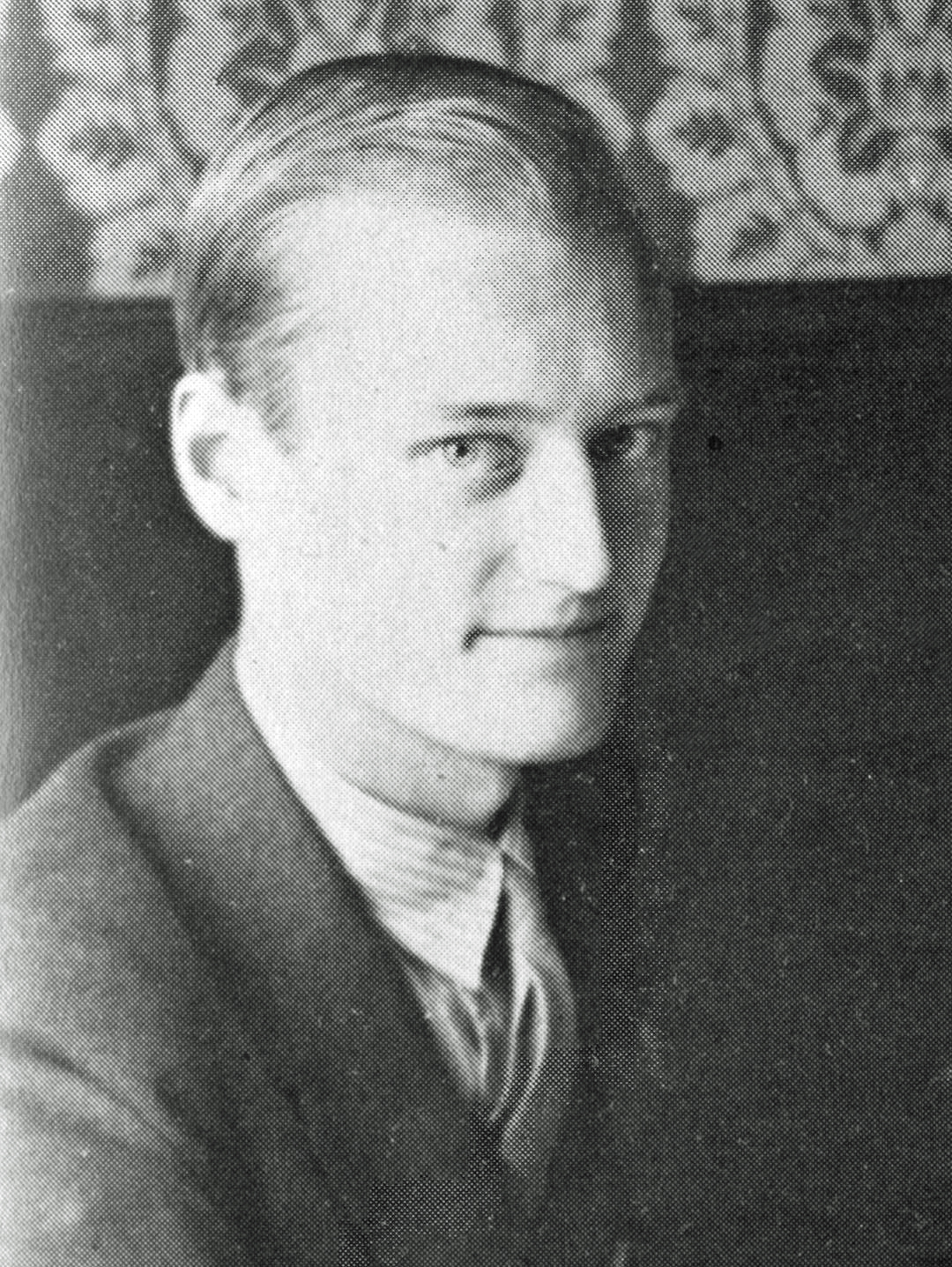
- Biörck in 1938
- Born: 4 April 1916; Gothenburg, Sweden
- Died: 28 October 1996 (aged 80); Stockholm
- Occupations: medical doctor, politician
- Family: Gilbert Kaplan (son-in-law)

Gunnar Biörck (4 April 1916 – 28 October 1996) was a Swedish physician, a specialist in cardiology, professor of medicine, personal physician for the Swedish Royal family, and member of the Riksdag (the Swedish parliament).

He was born in Gothenburg to Wilhelm Biörck and Lizzie Petterson, and was married to Margareta Lundberg in 1944. He was appointed professor of medicine at the Karolinska Institute from 1958. He was elected to the Riksdag in 1976, representing the Moderate Party, and stayed as a member until 1987. He died in October 1996.

His daughter, Lena M. Biörck, married American financier and conductor Gilbert Kaplan.
