= Ida Drougge =

Swedish politician (born 1990)

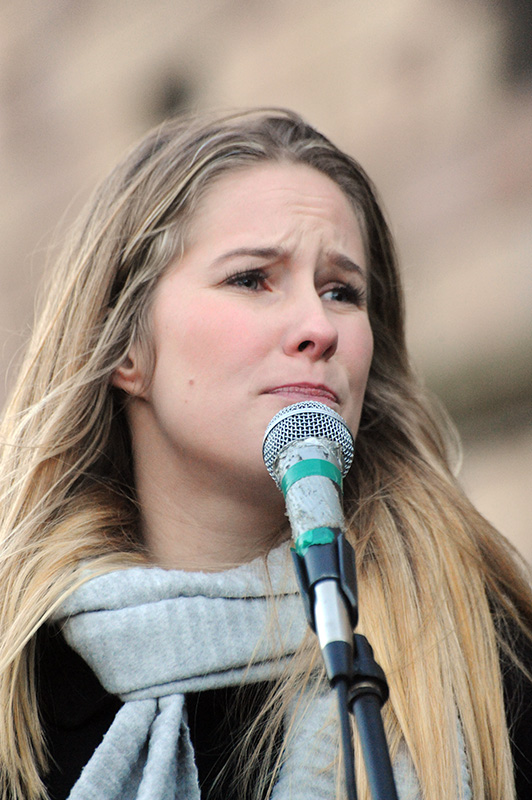
Ida Drougge

Ida Christina Drougge (born 15 August 1990), is a Swedish politician for the Moderate Party. She has been a member of the Riksdag for Stockholm since 2014. She has also worked as a production manager and filmproducer for Martin Borgs. She has also worked at the Lidingö Municipality, at the City council.
