= Bertil af Ugglas =

Swedish politician (1934–1977)

Gustaf Samuel Bertil Oscarsson baron af Ugglas (3 July 1934 – 7 July 1977) was Party Secretary of the Swedish Moderate Party between 1969 and 1974 and a member of the Swedish Riksdag.

== Early life ==
af Ugglas was born on 3 July 1934 in Stockholm, Sweden, the son of Commander baron Oscar af Ugglas and his wife Ingeborg (née countess Lewenhaupt). He graduated from Stockholm School of Economics in 1957.

== Career ==
af Ugglas worked for Wifstavarfs AB from 1958 to 1961 and Stockholms Enskilda Bank from 1961 to 1969. He served as Party Secretary of the Moderate Party from 1969 to 1974 and as member of the Riksdag from 1974. af Ugglas was a member of the Employment Inquiry (Sysselsättningsutredningen) and served as a board member of Försäkrings AB Skandia and the Bank of Sweden Tercentenary Foundation.

== Personal life ==
In 1966, af Ugglas married Margaretha Stenbeck, older sister of businessman Jan Stenbeck and Swedish minister for foreign affairs 1991–94).

== Death ==
af Ugglas traveled in mid-June 1977 to the United States to seek specialist care. He underwent surgery and died after the surgery in a Los Angeles hospital on 7 July 1977. The funeral service took place on 20 July 1977 in Kungsängen Church in Kungsängen, northwest of Stockholm.
