= Uppsala County (Riksdag constituency) =

Constituency of the Riksdag, the national legislature of Sweden

- Uppsala Län
- Constituency for the Riksdag
- Location of Uppsala County within Sweden
- County: Uppsala
- Population: 410,572 (2025)
- Electorate: 309,503 (2026)
- Area: 8,654 km^{2} (2026)

Current constituency
- Created: 1970
- Seats: List (Note: Constituency seats only.): 12 (2022–present); 11 (2006–2022); 10 (1994–2006); 9 (1976–1994); 8 (1970–1976)
- Member of the Riksdag: List: Fredrik Ahlstedt (M); Åsa Andersson (S); Catarina Deremar (C); Emil Eneblad (SD); Gustaf Lantz (S); Lina Nordquist (L); Stefan Olsson (M); Mikael Oscarsson (KD); David Perez (SD); Jacob Risberg (MP); Ardalan Shekarabi (S); Tobias Smedberg (V); Ylva Stadell (S)
- Created from: Uppsala County

Uppsala County (Swedish: Uppsala Län) is one of the 29 multi-member constituencies of the Riksdag, the national legislature of Sweden. The constituency was established in 1970 when the Riksdag changed from a bicameral legislature to a unicameral legislature. It is conterminous with the county of Uppsala. The constituency currently elects 12 of the 349 members of the Riksdag using the open party-list proportional representation electoral system. At the 2026 general election it had 309,503 registered electors.

== Electoral system ==
Uppsala County currently elects 12 of the 349 members of the Riksdag using the open party-list proportional representation electoral system. Constituency seats are allocated using the modified Sainte-Laguë method. Only parties that reach the 4% national threshold and parties that receive at least 12% of the vote in the constituency compete for constituency seats. Supplementary levelling seats may also be allocated at the constituency level to parties that reach the 4% national threshold.

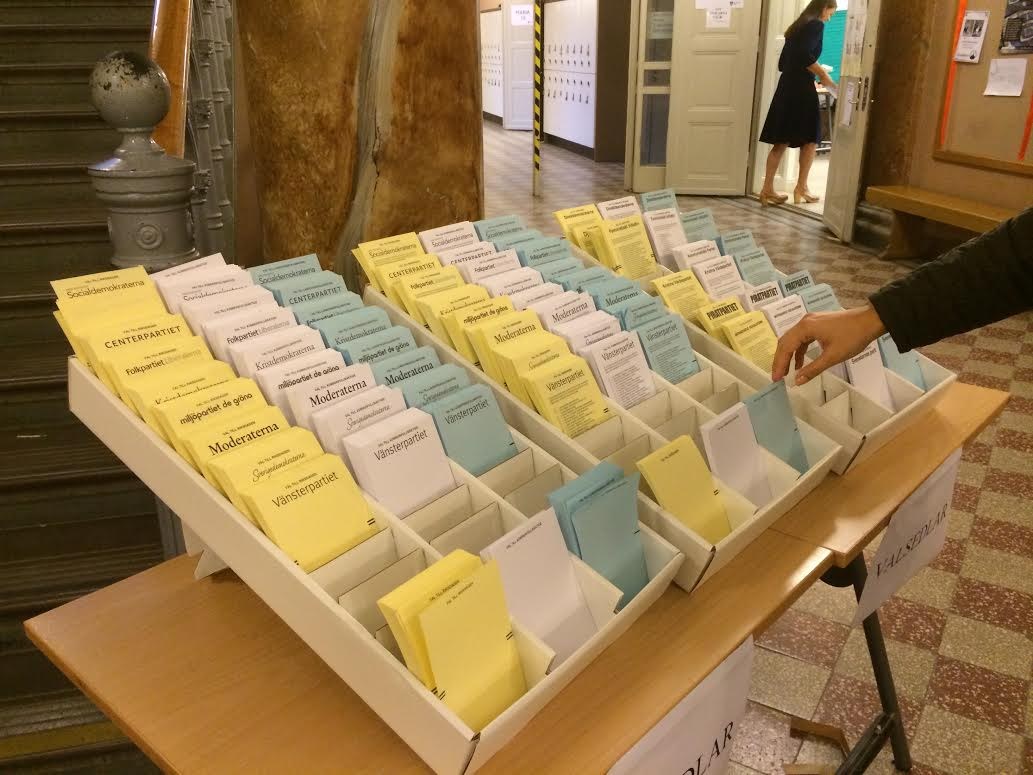
A selection of ballot papers available for voters at the 2014 general election in Stockholm - yellow for the Riksdag, blue for the regional council and white for the municipal council

Prior to 1997 voters could cast any ballot paper they wanted though, it had to contain the name of a party and the name of at least one candidate nominated by that party in the constituency. It was common for parties to hand out ballot papers with their name and list of candidates at the entrance of polling stations. Voters could delete the names of candidates or write-in the names of other candidates but in practice these options weren't used enough by voters to have any significant impact on the results and consequently elections operated as a closed system.

Since 1997, elections in Sweden follow the French model in having separate ballot papers for each party/list in a constituency. There are two ballot papers for each party - a party ballot paper (partivalsedel) with just the name of the party and a name ballot paper (namnvalsedel) with the name of the party and its list of candidates. There are also blank ballot papers (blank valsedel). Voters can initially pick as many ballot papers as they wish and then, in the secrecy of the voting booth, they select a single ballot paper of their choice. If they chose a name ballot paper they have the option of casting a preferential vote for one of their chosen party's candidates. If they chose a blank ballot paper they can write the name of any party including unregistered parties and, optionally, they can write the name of any person as their preferred candidate, even one that does not belong to their chosen party. They then place their chosen ballot paper in an envelope which is placed in the ballot box, discarding all other ballot papers they picked.

Seats won by each party/list in a constituency are allocated to its candidates in order of preference votes (a personal mandate), provided that the candidate has received at least 8% of votes cast for their party in the constituency (5% since January 2011). Any unfilled seats are then allocated to the party's remaining candidates in the order they appear on the party list (a party mandate).

== Election results ==
=== Summary ===
Election	Left V / VPK			Social Democrats S			Greens MP			Centre C			Liberals L / FP / F			Moderates M			Christian Democrats KD / KDS			Sweden Democrats SD		
Election	Votes	%	Seats	Votes	%	Seats	Votes	%	Seats	Votes	%	Seats	Votes	%	Seats	Votes	%	Seats	Votes	%	Seats	Votes	%	Seats
2026	25,773	9.69%	1	72,015	27.07%	3	22,199	8.35%	1	20,548	7.73%	1	13,246	4.98%	1	48,826	18.36%	2	17,672	6.64%	1	41,523	15.61%	2
2022	19,543	7.85%	1	72,499	29.13%	3	16,750	6.73%	1	18,040	7.25%	1	12,465	5.01%	1	45,457	18.26%	2	14,766	5.93%	1	45,237	18.18%	2
2018	21,102	8.74%	1	65,168	26.99%	3	13,404	5.55%	0	22,246	9.21%	1	15,071	6.24%	1	45,790	18.96%	2	16,661	6.90%	1	37,297	15.44%	2
2014	14,363	6.29%	1	65,926	28.87%	3	19,080	8.36%	1	15,827	6.93%	1	14,141	6.19%	1	52,071	22.80%	3	10,776	4.72%	0	24,091	10.55%	1
2010	11,845	5.51%	0	58,862	27.37%	3	18,993	8.83%	1	17,838	8.30%	1	16,878	7.85%	1	64,750	30.11%	4	12,265	5.70%	1	10,003	4.65%	0
2006	11,240	5.72%	0	60,674	30.89%	4	12,312	6.27%	1	19,340	9.85%	1	17,929	9.13%	1	52,016	26.49%	3	12,976	6.61%	1	4,483	2.28%	0
2002	14,372	8.15%	1	66,035	37.43%	4	10,062	5.70%	0	12,002	6.80%	0	27,594	15.64%	2	26,482	15.01%	2	15,646	8.87%	1	2,423	1.37%	0
1998	18,620	10.95%	1	58,503	34.39%	4	9,658	5.68%	0	9,855	5.79%	0	10,616	6.24%	1	40,546	23.84%	3	18,135	10.66%	1			
1994	10,333	5.85%	0	75,620	42.85%	5	10,816	6.13%	0	13,895	7.87%	1	15,803	8.95%	1	39,479	22.37%	3	6,743	3.82%	0			
1991	7,560	4.52%	0	58,981	35.26%	4	7,257	4.34%	0	15,107	9.03%	1	18,771	11.22%	1	36,878	22.05%	2	9,633	5.76%	0			
1988	10,022	6.24%	0	65,580	40.82%	5	9,148	5.69%	0	19,765	12.30%	1	21,854	13.60%	1	29,516	18.37%	2	3,224	2.01%	0			
1985	9,070	5.57%	0	70,602	43.32%	4	2,850	1.75%	0	20,629	12.66%	1	25,133	15.42%	2	33,377	20.48%	2	with C					
1982	9,777	6.11%	0	71,368	44.58%	5	3,248	2.03%	0	27,027	16.88%	2	10,086	6.30%	0	35,693	22.30%	2	2,353	1.47%	0			
1979	10,156	6.60%	0	65,153	42.34%	4				30,614	19.90%	2	16,415	10.67%	1	28,863	18.76%	2	1,756	1.14%	0			
1976	8,037	5.38%	0	63,017	42.20%	4				37,407	25.05%	3	16,807	11.26%	1	21,392	14.33%	1	1,818	1.22%	0			
1973	7,677	5.49%	0	60,090	42.96%	4				37,581	26.87%	2	13,318	9.52%	1	18,037	12.90%	1	2,257	1.61%	0			
1970	4,726	3.60%	0	60,182	45.84%	4				29,501	22.47%	2	19,319	14.72%	1	14,120	10.76%	1	2,554	1.95%	0			

(Excludes levelling seats. Figures in italics represent alliances/joint lists.)

=== Detailed ===
Party has received at least 4% of the vote nationally and is entitled to compete for constituency seats.

==== 2020s ====
===== 2026 =====
Results of the 2026 general election held on 13 September 2026:

Party		Votes per municipality								Total votes	%	Seats		
Party		Älvkar- leby	En- köping	Håbo	Heby	Knivsta	Öst- hammar	Tierp	Uppsala	Total votes	%	Con.	Lev.	Tot.
Swedish Social Democratic Party	S	1,986	8,029	3,204	2,340	3,056	4,222	4,178	45,000	72,015	27.07%	3	1	4
Moderate Party	M	1,043	6,815	3,603	1,546	2,801	2,846	2,254	27,918	48,826	18.36%	2	0	2
Sweden Democrats	SD	1,693	6,963	3,621	2,396	2,241	3,488	3,270	17,851	41,523	15.61%	2	0	2
Left Party	V	384	1,937	689	483	866	595	786	20,033	25,773	9.69%	1	0	1
Green Party	MP	192	1,219	498	347	974	499	594	17,876	22,199	8.35%	1	0	1
Centre Party	C	204	1,879	712	688	1,189	922	789	14,165	20,548	7.73%	1	0	1
Christian Democrats	KD	370	2,303	1,039	755	1,237	1,299	977	9,692	17,672	6.64%	1	0	1
Liberals	L	215	1,368	799	367	855	657	518	8,467	13,246	4.98%	1	0	1
Örebro Party	ÖP	66	237	92	107	84	120	148	680	1,534	0.58%	0	0	0
Alternative for Sweden	AfS	30	118	93	38	61	68	64	511	983	0.37%	0	0	0
Christian Values Party	KrVP	5	35	12	28	18	18	31	283	430	0.16%	0	0	0
Pirate Party	PP	7	26	9	6	18	8	12	286	372	0.14%	0	0	0
Ambition Sweden	AS	15	23	11	14	11	42	12	97	225	0.08%	0	0	0
Citizens' Coalition	MED	4	24	7	7	9	7	6	94	158	0.06%	0	0	0
Human Rights and Democracy	MoD	4	10	14	8	8	9	12	64	129	0.05%	0	0	0
Communist Party of Sweden	SKP	1	9	7	4	2	2	2	68	95	0.04%	0	0	0
United Voice	ER	0	3	1	0	3	7	0	53	67	0.03%	0	0	0
Direct Democrats	DD	0	2	2	0	4	0	2	20	30	0.01%	0	0	0
RegleraAI.nu		0	0	1	0	0	3	0	26	30	0.01%	0	0	0
Independent Rural Party	LPo	0	1	1	0	0	2	1	13	18	0.01%	0	0	0
New Allance		0	0	0	0	0	0	0	18	18	0.01%	0	0	0
Nordic Resistance Movement	NMR	0	2	2	1	0	0	2	11	18	0.01%	0	0	0
Classical Liberal Party	KLP	0	0	0	0	1	0	0	9	10	0.00%	0	0	0
Unity	ENH	1	0	2	1	1	0	1	4	10	0.00%	0	0	0
The Push Buttons	Kn	0	1	1	0	1	0	3	3	9	0.00%	0	0	0
Architecture Uprising Party		0	2	0	0	0	0	0	6	8	0.00%	0	0	0
Nuance Party	PNy	0	0	1	0	0	0	0	7	8	0.00%	0	0	0
Turning Point Party	PV	0	0	0	0	1	0	1	5	7	0.00%	0	0	0
Volt Sweden	Volt	0	0	0	0	2	0	0	5	7	0.00%	0	0	0
Donald Duck Party		0	0	0	0	0	0	0	3	3	0.00%	0	0	0
United Sweden		0	0	0	0	0	0	0	3	3	0.00%	0	0	0
AI Party		0	1	0	0	0	0	0	1	2	0.00%	0	0	0
Communist Party	K	0	0	0	0	0	0	0	2	2	0.00%	0	0	0
Pax		0	0	0	0	0	0	0	2	2	0.00%	0	0	0
Sweden's Intellectual Democrats		0	0	0	0	0	0	0	2	2	0.00%	0	0	0
99 Black Balloons		0	0	0	0	0	0	0	1	1	0.00%	0	0	0
A Good Sweden		0	0	0	0	0	0	0	1	1	0.00%	0	0	0
Democracy, People and Religion	DFR	0	0	0	0	0	0	1	0	1	0.00%	0	0	0
For the Good of All		0	0	0	0	0	0	0	1	1	0.00%	0	0	0
Peace Team		0	0	0	0	0	0	0	1	1	0.00%	0	0	0
Pensioners' Party		0	0	0	0	0	0	0	1	1	0.00%	0	0	0
Presidency		0	0	0	0	0	0	0	1	1	0.00%	0	0	0
Progress		0	0	0	0	0	1	0	0	1	0.00%	0	0	0
Responsible Intelligence in Politics		0	0	0	0	0	0	0	1	1	0.00%	0	0	0
The Anarchists		0	0	0	1	0	0	0	0	1	0.00%	0	0	0
Valid votes		6,220	31,007	14,421	9,137	13,443	14,815	13,664	163,285	265,992	100.00%	12	1	13
Blank votes		58	314	120	134	102	179	138	1,207	2,252	0.84%			
Rejected votes – unregistered parties		0	5	16	3	3	1	4	47	79	0.03%			
Rejected votes – other		2	32	11	7	8	11	11	143	225	0.08%			
Total polled		6,280	31,358	14,568	9,281	13,556	15,006	13,817	164,682	268,548	86.77%			
Registered electors		7,437	36,821	17,117	11,041	15,318	17,626	16,315	187,828	309,503				
Turnout		84.44%	85.16%	85.11%	84.06%	88.50%	85.14%	84.69%	87.68%	86.77%				

The following candidates were elected:

- Constituency seats (personal mandates) - Mikael Oscarsson (KD), 1,079 votes.
- Constituency seats (party mandates) - Fredrik Ahlstedt (M), 835 votes; Catarina Deremar (C), 613 votes; Emil Eneblad (SD), 13 votes; Gustaf Lantz (S), 699 votes; Lina Nordquist (L), 625 votes; Stefan Olsson (M), 1,701 votes; David Perez (SD), 126 votes; Jacob Risberg (MP), 665 votes; Ardalan Shekarabi (S), 3,371 votes; Tobias Smedberg (V), 1,254 votes; and Ylva Stadell (S), 943 votes.
- Levelling seats (party mandates) - Åsa Andersson (S), 657 votes.

===== 2022 =====
Results of the 2022 general election held on 11 September 2022:

Party		Votes per municipality								Total votes	%	Seats		
Party		Älvkar- leby	En- köping	Håbo	Heby	Knivsta	Öst- hammar	Tierp	Uppsala	Total votes	%	Con.	Lev.	Tot.
Swedish Social Democratic Party	S	2,164	8,146	3,432	2,528	3,020	4,450	4,641	44,118	72,499	29.13%	3	1	4
Moderate Party	M	881	6,325	3,330	1,355	2,542	2,714	1,953	26,357	45,457	18.26%	2	0	2
Sweden Democrats	SD	1,887	7,206	3,968	2,710	2,358	3,964	3,624	19,520	45,237	18.18%	2	0	2
Left Party	V	283	1,232	538	448	562	544	642	15,294	19,543	7.85%	1	0	1
Centre Party	C	203	1,954	731	726	939	789	969	11,729	18,040	7.25%	1	0	1
Green Party	MP	174	978	387	264	748	388	445	13,366	16,750	6.73%	1	0	1
Christian Democrats	KD	264	1,858	837	751	1,025	1,166	805	8,060	14,766	5.93%	1	0	1
Liberals	L	148	1,065	609	220	680	491	347	8,905	12,465	5.01%	1	0	1
Nuance Party	PNy	11	133	12	2	23	1	6	744	932	0.37%	0	0	0
Alternative for Sweden	AfS	18	75	51	24	51	42	48	321	630	0.25%	0	0	0
Citizens' Coalition	MED	1	66	25	24	33	20	11	407	587	0.24%	0	0	0
Pirate Party	PP	13	21	14	7	19	8	7	295	384	0.15%	0	0	0
Christian Values Party	KrVP	4	18	2	18	16	7	7	185	257	0.10%	0	0	0
The Push Buttons	Kn	19	34	9	31	11	24	22	74	224	0.09%	0	0	0
Independent Rural Party	LPo	3	4	1	10	1	15	30	138	202	0.08%	0	0	0
Human Rights and Democracy	MoD	7	22	18	11	12	13	9	74	166	0.07%	0	0	0
Feminist Initiative	FI	1	10	2	4	11	3	12	103	146	0.06%	0	0	0
Socialist Welfare Party	S-V	0	0	0	0	0	0	2	122	124	0.05%	0	0	0
Communist Party of Sweden	SKP	3	15	6	3	3	3	5	69	107	0.04%	0	0	0
Direct Democrats	DD	3	12	7	4	3	0	4	59	92	0.04%	0	0	0
Climate Alliance	KA	1	2	1	2	3	4	1	50	64	0.03%	0	0	0
Unity	ENH	0	8	3	4	2	1	3	22	43	0.02%	0	0	0
Nordic Resistance Movement	NMR	0	3	7	0	0	4	4	22	40	0.02%	0	0	0
Basic Income Party	BASIP	0	0	1	1	0	1	2	33	38	0.02%	0	0	0
Turning Point Party	PV	0	2	0	2	1	1	0	30	36	0.01%	0	0	0
Donald Duck Party		0	2	0	0	1	0	0	9	12	0.00%	0	0	0
Classical Liberal Party	KLP	0	0	0	0	1	0	0	10	11	0.00%	0	0	0
Hard Line Sweden		0	0	0	0	0	2	0	8	10	0.00%	0	0	0
Freedom Party		0	1	0	0	0	1	0	5	7	0.00%	0	0	0
Volt Sweden	Volt	0	0	0	0	0	0	0	4	4	0.00%	0	0	0
Sweden Out of the EU/ Free Justice Party		0	1	1	0	0	0	0	1	3	0.00%	0	0	0
Free Choice		0	0	0	0	0	0	0	2	2	0.00%	0	0	0
National Law of Sweden		0	0	0	0	0	0	0	2	2	0.00%	0	0	0
Change Party Revolution		0	0	0	0	0	0	0	1	1	0.00%	0	0	0
Electoral Cooperation Party		0	0	0	0	0	0	0	1	1	0.00%	0	0	0
Evil Chicken Party	OKP	0	0	0	0	0	1	0	0	1	0.00%	0	0	0
Freedom of the Family		0	0	0	0	0	0	1	0	1	0.00%	0	0	0
Green Democrats		0	0	0	0	0	0	0	1	1	0.00%	0	0	0
KSP		0	0	0	0	0	0	0	1	1	0.00%	0	0	0
The Anarchists		0	0	0	0	0	0	0	1	1	0.00%	0	0	0
The Least Bad Party		0	0	0	0	0	0	0	1	1	0.00%	0	0	0
Valid votes		6,088	29,193	13,992	9,149	12,065	14,657	13,600	150,144	248,888	100.00%	12	1	13
Blank votes		65	304	130	125	77	190	187	1,087	2,165	0.86%			
Rejected votes – unregistered parties		0	6	2	1	3	4	8	31	55	0.02%			
Rejected votes – other		3	21	2	5	7	14	18	120	190	0.08%			
Total polled		6,156	29,524	14,126	9,280	12,152	14,865	13,813	151,382	251,298	85.99%			
Registered electors		7,312	34,998	16,323	10,903	13,626	17,497	16,185	175,411	292,255				
Turnout		84.19%	84.36%	86.54%	85.11%	89.18%	84.96%	85.34%	86.30%	85.99%				

The following candidates were elected:

- Constituency seats (personal mandates) - Lina Nordquist (L), 732 votes; Mikael Oscarsson (KD), 1,306 votes; and Ilona Szatmári Waldau (V), 1,087 votes.
- Constituency seats (party mandates) - Catarina Deremar (C), 636 votes; Gustaf Lantz (S), 916 votes; Sanne Lennström (S), 1,301 votes; Stefan Olsson (M), 689 votes; David Perez (SD), 157 votes; Jacob Risberg (MP), 648 votes; Jessika Roswall (M), 1,874 votes; Ardalan Shekarabi (S), 3,157 votes; and Lars Wistedt (SD), 36 votes.
- Levelling seats (party mandates) - Inga-Lill Sjöblom (S), 304 votes.

Permanent substitutions:

- Jessika Roswall (M) resigned on 29 August 2024 and was replaced by Fredrik Ahlstedt (M) on the same day.
- Lars Wistedt (SD) died on 25 November 2024 and was replaced by Kent Kumpula (SD) on 26 November 2024.

==== 2010s ====
===== 2018 =====
Results of the 2018 general election held on 9 September 2018:

Party		Votes per municipality								Total votes	%	Seats		
Party		Älvkar- leby	En- köping	Håbo	Heby	Knivsta	Öst- hammar	Tierp	Uppsala	Total votes	%	Con.	Lev.	Tot.
Swedish Social Democratic Party	S	2,360	7,422	2,831	2,641	2,349	4,579	4,676	38,310	65,168	26.99%	3	1	4
Moderate Party	M	700	6,523	3,558	1,249	2,628	2,580	1,903	26,649	45,790	18.96%	2	0	2
Sweden Democrats	SD	1,607	5,791	3,237	2,074	1,908	3,128	2,890	16,662	37,297	15.44%	2	0	2
Centre Party	C	265	2,843	951	1,196	1,207	1,306	1,565	12,913	22,246	9.21%	1	0	1
Left Party	V	410	1,343	696	502	611	749	912	15,879	21,102	8.74%	1	0	1
Christian Democrats	KD	257	1,869	872	726	964	1,250	747	9,976	16,661	6.90%	1	0	1
Liberals	L	206	1,304	717	270	816	604	430	10,724	15,071	6.24%	1	0	1
Green Party	MP	133	885	375	213	613	378	376	10,431	13,404	5.55%	0	1	1
Feminist Initiative	FI	15	107	23	54	58	44	59	1,096	1,456	0.60%	0	0	0
Alternative for Sweden	AfS	20	110	34	40	37	51	65	502	859	0.36%	0	0	0
Independent Rural Party	LPo	4	64	4	41	7	72	90	339	621	0.26%	0	0	0
Citizens' Coalition	MED	2	59	22	16	29	14	21	389	552	0.23%	0	0	0
Pirate Party	PP	3	44	9	12	15	11	14	183	291	0.12%	0	0	0
Direct Democrats	DD	9	30	11	8	8	16	14	149	245	0.10%	0	0	0
Unity	ENH	6	29	25	11	6	14	18	86	195	0.08%	0	0	0
Christian Values Party	KrVP	2	9	5	3	5	6	6	101	137	0.06%	0	0	0
Nordic Resistance Movement	NMR	6	11	13	2	4	2	6	43	87	0.04%	0	0	0
Classical Liberal Party	KLP	1	4	2	0	4	1	2	67	81	0.03%	0	0	0
Communist Party of Sweden	SKP	0	7	0	0	0	1	0	69	77	0.03%	0	0	0
Animal Party	DjuP	3	3	4	5	5	4	5	45	74	0.03%	0	0	0
Initiative	INI	0	3	0	1	0	1	0	15	20	0.01%	0	0	0
Basic Income Party	BASIP	0	0	3	0	0	0	1	14	18	0.01%	0	0	0
Freedom of the Justice Party	S-FRP	0	0	1	0	0	0	0	2	3	0.00%	0	0	0
European Workers Party	EAP	0	0	0	0	1	0	0	1	2	0.00%	0	0	0
Security Party	TRP	0	0	0	0	0	0	0	1	1	0.00%	0	0	0
Parties not on the ballot		0	2	2	0	1	3	2	21	31	0.01%	0	0	0
Valid votes		6,009	28,462	13,395	9,064	11,276	14,814	13,802	144,667	241,489	100.00%	11	2	13
Blank votes		73	225	124	127	70	147	139	882	1,787	0.73%			
Rejected votes – unregistered parties		0	9	2	3	4	4	7	43	72	0.03%			
Rejected votes – other		5	19	9	4	3	4	3	49	96	0.04%			
Total polled		6,087	28,715	13,530	9,198	11,353	14,969	13,951	145,641	243,444	88.88%			
Registered electors		6,955	32,735	15,185	10,607	12,429	17,275	15,945	162,767	273,898				
Turnout		87.52%	87.72%	89.10%	86.72%	91.34%	86.65%	87.49%	89.48%	88.88%				

The following candidates were elected:

- Constituency seats (personal mandates) - Lina Nordquist (L), 1,023 votes; Mikael Oscarsson (KD), 1,486 votes; and Ilona Szatmári Waldau (V), 1,255 votes.
- Constituency seats (party mandates) - Paula Bieler (SD), 390 votes; Marlene Burwick (S), 1,466 votes; Pyry Niemi (S), 472 votes; Marta Obminska (M), 1,582 votes; Jessika Roswall (M), 1,264 votes; Michael Rubbestad (SD), 65 votes; Ardalan Shekarabi (S), 3,104 votes; and Solveig Zander (C), 942 votes.
- Levelling seats (party mandates) - Maria Gardfjell (MP), 924 votes; and Sanne Lennström (S), 864 votes.

Permanent substitutions:

- Paula Bieler (SD) resigned on 28 February 2020 and was replaced by David Perez (SD) on 29 February 2020.
- Solveig Zander (C) resigned on 31 December 2020 and was replaced by Catarina Deremar (C) on 1 January 2021.

===== 2014 =====
Results of the 2014 general election held on 14 September 2014:

Party		Votes per municipality								Total votes	%	Seats		
Party		Älvkar- leby	En- köping	Håbo	Heby	Knivsta	Öst- hammar	Tierp	Uppsala	Total votes	%	Con.	Lev.	Tot.
Swedish Social Democratic Party	S	2,840	8,067	3,247	3,132	2,111	5,478	5,669	35,382	65,926	28.87%	3	0	3
Moderate Party	M	774	7,068	4,262	1,443	2,977	3,017	2,010	30,520	52,071	22.80%	3	0	3
Sweden Democrats	SD	1,198	3,607	1,874	1,454	1,048	1,894	1,898	11,118	24,091	10.55%	1	0	1
Green Party	MP	229	1,462	707	315	774	527	553	14,513	19,080	8.36%	1	0	1
Centre Party	C	187	2,380	613	1,156	777	1,285	1,294	8,135	15,827	6.93%	1	0	1
Left Party	V	375	985	423	408	383	611	680	10,498	14,363	6.29%	1	0	1
Liberal People's Party	FP	171	1,329	613	237	630	601	380	10,180	14,141	6.19%	1	0	1
Christian Democrats	KD	132	1,071	537	427	653	458	390	7,108	10,776	4.72%	0	1	1
Feminist Initiative	FI	85	464	197	162	254	278	259	7,618	9,317	4.08%	0	0	0
Pirate Party	PP	31	149	62	47	51	43	72	859	1,314	0.58%	0	0	0
Independent Rural Party	LPo	0	22	0	15	12	103	43	314	509	0.22%	0	0	0
Unity	ENH	3	23	43	13	18	11	15	125	251	0.11%	0	0	0
Party of the Swedes	SVP	6	24	18	5	7	4	15	91	170	0.07%	0	0	0
Animal Party	DjuP	2	8	8	6	5	5	11	98	143	0.06%	0	0	0
Christian Values Party	KrVP	0	8	5	1	6	10	5	95	130	0.06%	0	0	0
Classical Liberal Party	KLP	1	8	0	0	2	1	3	46	61	0.03%	0	0	0
Direct Democrats	DD	0	5	1	1	0	11	4	33	55	0.02%	0	0	0
Health Party		0	0	2	0	2	0	0	3	7	0.00%	0	0	0
Communist Party of Sweden	SKP	0	1	0	0	0	0	0	4	5	0.00%	0	0	0
European Workers Party	EAP	0	0	0	0	1	0	0	2	3	0.00%	0	0	0
Socialist Justice Party	RS	0	2	0	0	0	0	0	1	3	0.00%	0	0	0
Swedish Senior Citizen Interest Party	SPI	1	0	0	0	0	0	0	2	3	0.00%	0	0	0
Human Democrats	HumDe	0	0	0	0	0	0	0	2	2	0.00%	0	0	0
Freedom of the Justice Party	S-FRP	0	0	0	0	0	0	0	1	1	0.00%	0	0	0
Peace Democrats	FD	0	0	0	0	0	0	0	1	1	0.00%	0	0	0
Progressive Party		0	0	0	0	0	0	0	1	1	0.00%	0	0	0
Parties not on the ballot		1	15	4	2	5	6	7	60	100	0.04%	0	0	0
Valid votes		6,036	26,698	12,616	8,824	9,716	14,343	13,308	136,810	228,351	100.00%	11	1	12
Blank votes		58	307	136	141	109	173	166	927	2,017	0.88%			
Rejected votes – other		2	12	6	3	4	9	3	33	72	0.03%			
Total polled		6,096	27,017	12,758	8,968	9,829	14,525	13,477	137,770	230,440	87.39%			
Registered electors		7,035	31,416	14,561	10,545	11,041	17,053	15,750	156,279	263,680				
Turnout		86.65%	86.00%	87.62%	85.05%	89.02%	85.18%	85.57%	88.16%	87.39%				

The following candidates were elected:

- Constituency seats (personal mandates) - Emma Wallrup (V), 1,060 votes; Maria Weimer (FP), 1,123 votes; and Solveig Zander (C), 1,024 votes.
- Constituency seats (party mandates) - Per Bill (M), 1,016 votes; Josef Fransson (SD), 14 votes; Agneta Gille (S), 2,476 votes; Ulrika Karlsson (M), 2,182 votes; Niclas Malmberg (MP), 586 votes; Pyry Niemi (S), 643 votes; Ardalan Shekarabi (S), 2,936 votes; and Jessika Vilhelmsson (M), 1,459 votes.
- Levelling seats (personal mandates) - Mikael Oscarsson (KD), 1,756 votes.

Permanent substitutions:

- Per Bill (M) resigned on 27 August 2015 and was replaced by Marta Obminska (M) on the same day.
- Emma Wallrup (V) resigned on 7 June 2018 and was replaced by Jeannette Escanilla (V) on the same day.

===== 2010 =====
Results of the 2010 general election held on 19 September 2010:

Party		Votes per municipality								Total votes	%	Seats		
Party		Älvkar- leby	En- köping	Håbo	Heby	Knivsta	Öst- hammar	Tierp	Uppsala	Total votes	%	Con.	Lev.	Tot.
Moderate Party	M	1,136	8,755	5,097	1,979	3,435	3,888	2,658	37,802	64,750	30.11%	4	0	4
Swedish Social Democratic Party	S	2,875	7,325	2,983	2,818	1,720	4,861	5,536	30,744	58,862	27.37%	3	0	3
Green Party	MP	304	1,511	653	354	664	610	606	14,291	18,993	8.83%	1	0	1
Centre Party	C	189	2,527	601	1,197	830	1,469	1,344	9,681	17,838	8.30%	1	0	1
Liberal People's Party	FP	296	1,330	860	429	856	803	588	11,716	16,878	7.85%	1	0	1
Christian Democrats	KD	149	1,164	564	460	636	573	471	8,248	12,265	5.70%	1	0	1
Left Party	V	401	896	368	402	311	619	690	8,158	11,845	5.51%	0	1	1
Sweden Democrats	SD	466	1,370	701	578	399	763	810	4,916	10,003	4.65%	0	1	1
Pirate Party	PP	38	184	101	58	85	80	85	1,239	1,870	0.87%	0	0	0
Feminist Initiative	FI	12	65	25	34	42	31	34	1,077	1,320	0.61%	0	0	0
Rural Democrats		3	1	0	10	0	61	77	37	189	0.09%	0	0	0
Classical Liberal Party	KLP	0	2	0	0	1	1	1	26	31	0.01%	0	0	0
Freedom Party		0	5	3	0	0	0	1	21	30	0.01%	0	0	0
National Democrats	ND	0	6	0	0	0	1	2	11	20	0.01%	0	0	0
Party of the Swedes	SVP	0	2	1	0	1	1	1	8	14	0.01%	0	0	0
Unity	ENH	0	5	0	0	0	2	1	6	14	0.01%	0	0	0
Swedish Senior Citizen Interest Party	SPI	2	0	0	1	0	2	0	8	13	0.01%	0	0	0
Communist Party of Sweden	SKP	0	1	0	0	0	1	0	9	11	0.01%	0	0	0
Socialist Justice Party	RS	0	3	0	0	0	0	0	8	11	0.01%	0	0	0
Health Care Party	Sjvåp	0	0	0	0	0	0	0	8	8	0.00%	0	0	0
Spirits Party		0	1	1	0	1	1	0	2	6	0.00%	0	0	0
Active Democracy		0	0	0	0	0	0	0	4	4	0.00%	0	0	0
European Workers Party	EAP	0	0	0	0	0	0	0	4	4	0.00%	0	0	0
Norrländska Coalition	NorrS	1	1	0	0	0	0	0	2	4	0.00%	0	0	0
Alliance Party / Citizen's Voice	ALP	0	0	0	0	0	0	0	1	1	0.00%	0	0	0
Parties not on the ballot		2	7	1	2	0	0	2	32	46	0.02%	0	0	0
Valid votes		5,874	25,161	11,959	8,322	8,981	13,767	12,907	128,059	215,030	100.00%	11	2	13
Blank votes		84	357	146	155	76	204	183	1,276	2,481	1.14%			
Rejected votes – other		2	9	7	3	2	7	24	30	84	0.04%			
Total polled		5,960	25,527	12,112	8,480	9,059	13,978	13,114	129,365	217,595	85.75%			
Registered electors		7,030	30,281	14,062	10,385	10,256	16,819	15,616	149,316	253,765				
Turnout		84.78%	84.30%	86.13%	81.66%	88.33%	83.11%	83.98%	86.64%	85.75%				

The following candidates were elected:

- Constituency seats (personal mandates) - Mikael Oscarsson (KD), 2,009 votes; and Thomas Östros (S), 5,218 votes.
- Constituency seats (party mandates) - Per Bill (M), 1,463 votes; Agneta Gille (S), 1,435 votes; Ismail Kamil (FP), 760 votes; Ulrika Karlsson (M), 3,676 votes; Helena Leander (MP), 1,230 votes; Pyry Niemi (S), 596 votes; Marta Obminska (M), 477 votes; Jessika Vilhelmsson (M), 1,970 votes; and Solveig Zander (C), 1,344 votes.
- Levelling seats (party mandates) - Lars Isovaara (SD), 6 votes; and Jacob Johnson (V), 630 votes.

Permanent substitutions:

- Thomas Östros (S) resigned on 31 July 2012 and was replaced by Lena Sommestad (S) on 1 August 2012.
- Lars Isovaara (SD) resigned on 3 December 2012 and was replaced by Markus Wiechel (SD) on the same day.
- Lena Sommestad (S) resigned on 28 February 2014 and was replaced by Roger Lamell (S) on 1 March 2014.

==== 2000s ====
===== 2006 =====
Results of the 2006 general election held on 17 September 2006:

Party		Votes per municipality								Total votes	%	Seats		
Party		Älvkar- leby	En- köping	Håbo	Heby	Knivsta	Öst- hammar	Tierp	Uppsala	Total votes	%	Con.	Lev.	Tot.
Swedish Social Democratic Party	S	3,022	7,866	3,091	2,946	1,923	5,094	5,495	31,237	60,674	30.89%	4	0	4
Moderate Party	M	813	6,688	4,254	1,520	2,688	3,037	1,764	31,252	52,016	26.49%	3	0	3
Centre Party	C	254	2,874	639	1,360	796	1,693	1,722	10,002	19,340	9.85%	1	0	1
Liberal People's Party	FP	276	1,202	735	404	786	781	666	13,079	17,929	9.13%	1	0	1
Christian Democrats	KD	206	1,363	677	573	629	707	656	8,165	12,976	6.61%	1	0	1
Green Party	MP	192	1,007	424	251	437	473	431	9,097	12,312	6.27%	1	0	1
Left Party	V	423	874	385	474	283	568	656	7,577	11,240	5.72%	0	1	1
Sweden Democrats	SD	209	517	252	305	202	302	377	2,319	4,483	2.28%	0	0	0
Feminist Initiative	FI	31	91	52	37	48	57	58	1,416	1,790	0.91%	0	0	0
Pirate Party	PP	47	142	100	45	59	63	59	1,060	1,575	0.80%	0	0	0
June List		50	105	62	75	35	86	79	421	913	0.46%	0	0	0
Swedish Senior Citizen Interest Party	SPI	5	171	12	15	12	12	6	164	397	0.20%	0	0	0
Health Care Party	Sjvåp	24	57	1	14	6	26	18	247	393	0.20%	0	0	0
National Democrats	ND	1	38	47	1	6	5	2	40	140	0.07%	0	0	0
Unity	ENH	4	5	8	0	3	6	6	30	62	0.03%	0	0	0
New Future	NYF	0	1	0	0	0	1	5	20	27	0.01%	0	0	0
National Socialist Front		0	4	0	1	0	0	2	15	22	0.01%	0	0	0
Freedom of the Justice Party	S-FRP	0	0	1	0	0	0	0	9	10	0.01%	0	0	0
People's Will		0	2	1	0	0	0	0	6	9	0.00%	0	0	0
The Communists	KOMM	0	0	0	0	0	0	1	5	6	0.00%	0	0	0
Classical Liberal Party	KLP	0	2	0	0	0	1	0	2	5	0.00%	0	0	0
Socialist Justice Party	RS	0	3	0	0	0	0	0	2	5	0.00%	0	0	0
European Workers Party	EAP	0	0	0	1	0	0	0	3	4	0.00%	0	0	0
Kvinnokraft		0	0	0	0	0	0	0	2	2	0.00%	0	0	0
Partiet.se		0	0	0	0	0	0	1	1	2	0.00%	0	0	0
Active Democracy		0	0	0	0	0	0	0	1	1	0.00%	0	0	0
Unique Party		0	1	0	0	0	0	0	0	1	0.00%	0	0	0
Other parties		1	7	5	1	2	2	2	35	55	0.03%	0	0	0
Valid votes		5,558	23,020	10,746	8,023	7,915	12,914	12,006	116,207	196,389	100.00%	11	1	12
Blank votes		118	534	161	210	127	294	249	1,798	3,491	1.75%			
Rejected votes – other		4	17	25	1	1	3	1	31	83	0.04%			
Total polled		5,680	23,571	10,932	8,234	8,043	13,211	12,256	118,036	199,963	82.87%			
Registered electors		6,888	29,043	13,088	10,342	9,361	16,630	15,358	140,588	241,298				
Turnout		82.46%	81.16%	83.53%	79.62%	85.92%	79.44%	79.80%	83.96%	82.87%				

The following candidates were elected:

- Constituency seats (personal mandates) - Mikael Oscarsson (KD), 1,777 votes; and Cecilia Wikström (FP), 2,013 votes.
- Constituency seats (party mandates) - Mats Berglind (S), 391 votes; Per Bill (M), 2,252 votes; Agneta Gille (S), 834 votes; Lennart Hedquist (M), 1,254 votes; Ulrika Karlsson (M), 1,254 votes; Helena Leander (MP), 618 votes; Thomas Östros (S), 3,130 votes; Tone Tingsgård (S), 176 votes; and Solveig Zander (C), 1,294 votes.
- Levelling seats (party mandates) - Jacob Johnson (V), 338 votes.

Permanent substitutions:

- Cecilia Wikström (FP) resigned on 13 July 2009 upon being elected to the European Parliament and was replaced by Erik Ullenhag (FP) on 14 July 2009.

===== 2002 =====
Results of the 2002 general election held on 15 September 2002:

Party		Votes per municipality							Total votes	%	Seats		
Party		Älvkar- leby	En- köping	Håbo	Knivsta	Öst- hammar	Tierp	Uppsala	Total votes	%	Con.	Lev.	Tot.
Swedish Social Democratic Party	S	3,255	8,686	3,585	2,279	5,799	6,061	36,370	66,035	37.43%	4	0	4
Liberal People's Party	FP	434	2,345	1,365	1,281	1,097	962	20,110	27,594	15.64%	2	0	2
Moderate Party	M	359	3,550	2,287	1,436	1,633	981	16,236	26,482	15.01%	2	0	2
Christian Democrats	KD	257	2,088	1,068	755	1,002	914	9,562	15,646	8.87%	1	0	1
Left Party	V	534	1,167	493	391	823	878	10,086	14,372	8.15%	1	0	1
Centre Party	C	168	2,479	396	485	1,534	1,490	5,450	12,002	6.80%	0	1	1
Green Party	MP	184	766	374	361	496	442	7,439	10,062	5.70%	0	1	1
Sweden Democrats	SD	120	169	98	117	150	175	1,594	2,423	1.37%	0	0	0
Swedish Senior Citizen Interest Party	SPI	3	387	62	16	37	18	574	1,097	0.62%	0	0	0
New Future	NYF	0	21	7	10	7	11	82	138	0.08%	0	0	0
New Democracy	NyD	1	16	5	7	14	1	62	106	0.06%	0	0	0
Socialist Party	SOC.P	0	0	0	0	0	1	67	68	0.04%	0	0	0
Unity	ENH	0	1	0	4	1	0	6	12	0.01%	0	0	0
The Communists	KOMM	0	1	1	0	1	0	8	11	0.01%	0	0	0
European Workers Party	EAP	0	0	2	0	0	0	5	7	0.00%	0	0	0
Socialist Justice Party	RS	0	0	0	0	0	0	2	2	0.00%	0	0	0
Other parties		2	40	59	20	22	13	189	345	0.20%	0	0	0
Valid votes		5,317	21,716	9,802	7,162	12,616	11,947	107,842	176,402	100.00%	10	2	12
Rejected votes		74	423	198	113	230	198	1,714	2,950	1.64%			
Total polled		5,391	22,139	10,000	7,275	12,846	12,145	109,556	179,352	80.85%			
Registered electors		6,779	27,955	12,357	8,772	16,420	15,394	134,154	221,831				
Turnout		79.53%	79.20%	80.93%	82.93%	78.23%	78.89%	81.66%	80.85%				

The following candidates were elected:

- Constituency seats (personal mandates) - Mikael Oscarsson (KD), 1,710 votes.
- Constituency seats (party mandates) - Mats Berglind (S), 593 votes; Per Bill (M), 1,930 votes; Ingrid Burman (V), 710 votes; Agneta Gille (S), 876 votes; Lennart Hedquist (M), 659 votes; Thomas Östros (S), 4,798 votes; Tone Tingsgård (S), 401 votes; Erik Ullenhag (FP), 2,137 votes; and Cecilia Wikström (FP), 1,657 votes.
- Levelling seats (personal mandates) - Åsa Domeij (MP), 1,471 votes; and Rigmor Stenmark (C), 1,008 votes.

==== 1990s ====
===== 1998 =====
Results of the 1998 general election held on 20 September 1998:

Party		Votes per municipality						Total votes	%	Seats		
Party		Älvkar- leby	En- köping	Håbo	Öst- hammar	Tierp	Uppsala	Total votes	%	Con.	Lev.	Tot.
Swedish Social Democratic Party	S	3,104	7,758	3,217	5,371	5,857	33,196	58,503	34.39%	4	0	4
Moderate Party	M	568	5,420	3,242	2,325	1,498	27,493	40,546	23.84%	3	0	3
Left Party	V	917	1,720	714	1,329	1,267	12,673	18,620	10.95%	1	0	1
Christian Democrats	KD	307	2,501	1,104	1,115	1,123	11,985	18,135	10.66%	1	0	1
Liberal People's Party	FP	181	691	347	414	369	8,614	10,616	6.24%	1	0	1
Centre Party	C	118	2,064	304	1,244	1,310	4,815	9,855	5.79%	0	1	1
Green Party	MP	179	908	370	524	473	7,204	9,658	5.68%	0	1	1
Other parties		86	258	205	319	199	3,096	4,163	2.45%	0	0	0
Valid votes		5,460	21,320	9,503	12,641	12,096	109,076	170,096	100.00%	10	2	12
Rejected votes		113	564	216	374	300	2,675	4,242	2.43%			
Total polled		5,573	21,884	9,719	13,015	12,396	111,751	174,338	81.87%			
Registered electors		6,820	26,826	11,944	16,259	15,251	135,843	212,943				
Turnout		81.72%	81.58%	81.37%	80.05%	81.28%	82.26%	81.87%				

The following candidates were elected:

- Constituency seats (personal mandates) - Per Bill (M), 3,581 votes; Birgitta Dahl (S), 5,945 votes; Harald Nordlund (FP), 1,178 votes; and Mikael Oscarsson (KD), 1,509 votes.
- Constituency seats (party mandates) - Barbro Andersson (S), 691 votes; Mats Berglind (S), 567 votes; Ingrid Burman (V), 1,269 votes; Gustaf von Essen (M), 1,707 votes; Lennart Hedquist (M), 1,076 votes; and Thomas Östros (S), 2,121 votes.
- Levelling seats (personal mandates) - Rigmor Ahlstedt (C), 1,472 votes.
- Levelling seats (party mandates) - Gunnar Goude (MP), 537 votes.

===== 1994 =====
Results of the 1994 general election held on 18 September 1994:

Party		Votes per municipality						Total votes	%	Seats		
Party		Älvkar- leby	En- köping	Håbo	Öst- hammar	Tierp	Uppsala	Total votes	%	Con.	Lev.	Tot.
Swedish Social Democratic Party	S	4,373	9,870	3,915	6,944	7,605	42,913	75,620	42.85%	5	0	5
Moderate Party	M	536	5,037	3,346	2,405	1,531	26,624	39,479	22.37%	3	0	3
Liberal People's Party	FP	291	1,330	657	659	702	12,164	15,803	8.95%	1	0	1
Centre Party	C	172	2,765	458	1,746	1,768	6,986	13,895	7.87%	1	0	1
Green Party	MP	186	1,051	398	728	491	7,962	10,816	6.13%	0	1	1
Left Party	V	377	868	436	637	587	7,428	10,333	5.85%	0	1	1
Christian Democratic Unity	KDS	72	719	278	281	381	5,012	6,743	3.82%	0	0	0
New Democracy	NyD	57	339	175	206	143	1,230	2,150	1.22%	0	0	0
Other parties		44	137	138	116	101	1,119	1,655	0.94%	0	0	0
Valid votes		6,108	22,116	9,801	13,722	13,309	111,438	176,494	100.00%	10	2	12
Rejected votes		60	403	218	242	182	1,750	2,855	1.59%			
Total polled		6,168	22,519	10,019	13,964	13,491	113,188	179,349	87.38%			
Registered electors		6,951	26,686	11,418	16,329	15,342	128,524	205,250				
Turnout		88.74%	84.39%	87.75%	85.52%	87.94%	88.07%	87.38%				

The following candidates were elected: Rigmor Ahlstedt (C); Barbro Andersson (S); Ingrid Andersson (S); Per Bill (M); Ingrid Burman (V); Birgitta Dahl (S); Gustaf von Essen (M); Gunnar Goude (MP); Lennart Hedquist (M); Håkan Holmberg (FP); Björn Kaaling (S); and Thomas Östros (S).

Permanent substitutions:

- Håkan Holmberg (FP) resigned on 15 September 1997 and was replaced by Ann-Kristin Føsker (FP) on 16 September 1997.

===== 1991 =====
Results of the 1991 general election held on 15 September 1991:

Party		Votes per municipality						Total votes	%	Seats		
Party		Älvkar- leby	En- köping	Håbo	Öst- hammar	Tierp	Uppsala	Total votes	%	Con.	Lev.	Tot.
Swedish Social Democratic Party	S	3,841	8,001	2,741	5,628	6,690	32,080	58,981	35.26%	4	0	4
Moderate Party	M	511	4,955	3,076	2,266	1,419	24,651	36,878	22.05%	2	0	2
Liberal People's Party	FP	412	1,846	816	1,010	917	13,770	18,771	11.22%	1	0	1
Centre Party	C	246	2,982	457	2,012	2,029	7,381	15,107	9.03%	1	0	1
New Democracy	NyD	393	1,588	997	1,050	834	7,634	12,496	7.47%	1	0	1
Christian Democratic Unity	KDS	181	1,330	399	593	683	6,447	9,633	5.76%	0	1	1
Left Party	V	306	587	274	445	383	5,565	7,560	4.52%	0	1	1
Green Party	MP	109	608	186	363	292	5,699	7,257	4.34%	0	0	0
Other parties		44	51	25	65	37	378	600	0.36%	0	0	0
Valid votes		6,043	21,948	8,971	13,432	13,284	103,605	167,283	100.00%	9	2	11
Rejected votes		82	485	160	258	204	1,895	3,084	1.81%			
Total polled		6,125	22,433	9,131	13,690	13,488	105,500	170,367	86.95%			
Registered electors		6,949	26,144	10,359	16,012	15,446	121,018	195,928				
Turnout		88.14%	85.81%	88.15%	85.50%	87.32%	87.18%	86.95%				

The following candidates were elected: Ingrid Andersson (S); Birgitta Dahl (S); Berith Eriksson (V); Gustaf von Essen (M); Håkan Holmberg (FP); Robert Juosma (NyD); Björn Kaaling (S); Rosa Östh (C); Lars Svensk (KDS); Gunnar Thollander (S); and Ingegerd Troedsson (M).

==== 1980s ====
===== 1988 =====
Results of the 1988 general election held on 18 September 1988:

Party		Votes per municipality						Total votes	%	Seats		
Party		Älvkar- leby	En- köping	Håbo	Öst- hammar	Tierp	Uppsala	Total votes	%	Con.	Lev.	Tot.
Swedish Social Democratic Party	S	4,171	8,679	3,190	5,920	7,280	36,340	65,580	40.82%	5	0	5
Moderate Party	M	386	3,682	2,332	1,717	1,064	20,335	29,516	18.37%	2	0	2
Liberal People's Party	FP	510	2,432	1,121	1,222	1,153	15,416	21,854	13.60%	1	1	2
Centre Party	C	361	3,804	648	2,506	2,515	9,931	19,765	12.30%	1	0	1
Left Party – Communists	VPK	385	696	372	618	397	7,554	10,022	6.24%	0	1	1
Green Party	MP	194	899	334	542	451	6,728	9,148	5.69%	0	1	1
Christian Democratic Unity	KDS	68	355	121	221	296	2,163	3,224	2.01%	0	0	0
Other parties		21	178	42	133	108	1,084	1,566	0.97%	0	0	0
Valid votes		6,096	20,725	8,160	12,879	13,264	99,551	160,675	100.00%	9	3	12
Rejected votes		55	306	146	168	148	1,386	2,209	1.36%			
Total polled		6,151	21,031	8,306	13,047	13,412	100,937	162,884	86.29%			
Registered electors		6,957	24,881	9,557	15,438	15,288	116,648	188,769				
Turnout		88.41%	84.53%	86.91%	84.51%	87.73%	86.53%	86.29%				

The following candidates were elected: Lars Ahlmark (M); Ingrid Andersson (S); Paul Ciszuk (MP); Birgitta Dahl (S); Berith Eriksson (VPK); Arne Gadd (S); Håkan Holmberg (FP); Rosa Östh (C); Gustav Persson (S); Barbro Sandberg (FP); Gunnar Thollander (S); and Ingegerd Troedsson (M).

Permanent substitutions:

- Arne Gadd (S) resigned on 3 October 1989 and was replaced by Barbro Andersson (S) on the same day.

===== 1985 =====
Results of the 1985 general election held on 15 September 1985:

Party		Votes per municipality						Total votes	%	Seats		
Party		Älvkar- leby	En- köping	Håbo	Öst- hammar	Tierp	Uppsala	Total votes	%	Con.	Lev.	Tot.
Swedish Social Democratic Party	S	4,719	9,213	3,242	6,437	7,747	39,244	70,602	43.32%	4	1	5
Moderate Party	M	506	4,419	2,449	2,123	1,386	22,494	33,377	20.48%	2	0	2
Liberal People's Party	FP	526	2,746	1,136	1,480	1,443	17,802	25,133	15.42%	2	0	2
Centre Party	C	376	3,990	627	2,641	2,703	10,292	20,629	12.66%	1	0	1
Left Party – Communists	VPK	310	624	314	488	387	6,947	9,070	5.57%	0	1	1
Green Party	MP	64	293	82	214	118	2,079	2,850	1.75%	0	0	0
Other parties		6	60	19	61	47	1,125	1,318	0.81%	0	0	0
Valid votes		6,507	21,345	7,869	13,444	13,831	99,983	162,979	100.00%	9	2	11
Rejected votes		31	236	66	135	126	956	1,550	0.94%			
Total polled		6,538	21,581	7,935	13,579	13,957	100,939	164,529	90.16%			
Registered electors		7,098	24,202	8,704	15,300	15,399	111,784	182,487				
Turnout		92.11%	89.17%	91.16%	88.75%	90.64%	90.30%	90.16%				

The following candidates were elected: Lars Ahlmark (M); Ingrid Andersson (S); Birgitta Dahl (S); Arne Gadd (S); Rosa Östh (C); Gustav Persson (S); Barbro Sandberg (FP); Oswald Söderqvist (VPK); Gunnar Thollander (S); Ingegerd Troedsson (M); and Jörgen Ullenhag (FP).

Permanent substitutions:

- Jörgen Ullenhag (FP) resigned on 30 November 1985 and was replaced by Per Arne Aglert (FP) on 1 December 1985.

===== 1982 =====
Results of the 1982 general election held on 19 September 1982:

Party		Votes per municipality						Total votes	%	Seats		
Party		Älvkar- leby	En- köping	Håbo	Öst- hammar	Tierp	Uppsala	Total votes	%	Con.	Lev.	Tot.
Swedish Social Democratic Party	S	4,843	9,408	3,169	6,496	7,894	39,558	71,368	44.58%	5	0	5
Moderate Party	M	589	4,763	2,416	2,159	1,498	24,268	35,693	22.30%	2	0	2
Centre Party	C	573	4,825	941	3,268	3,234	14,186	27,027	16.88%	2	0	2
Liberal People's Party	FP	219	940	330	608	776	7,213	10,086	6.30%	0	1	1
Left Party – Communists	VPK	309	686	334	491	387	7,570	9,777	6.11%	0	1	1
Green Party	MP	61	308	99	242	153	2,385	3,248	2.03%	0	0	0
Christian Democratic Unity	KDS	48	251	71	211	271	1,501	2,353	1.47%	0	0	0
K-Party	K-P	1	4	2	9	7	53	76	0.05%	0	0	0
Other parties		7	20	7	3	14	394	445	0.28%	0	0	0
Valid votes		6,650	21,205	7,369	13,487	14,234	97,128	160,073	100.00%	9	2	11
Rejected votes		40	249	93	123	116	1,197	1,818	1.12%			
Total polled		6,690	21,454	7,462	13,610	14,350	98,325	161,891	91.71%			
Registered electors		7,159	23,663	7,992	15,064	15,547	107,104	176,529				
Turnout		93.45%	90.66%	93.37%	90.35%	92.30%	91.80%	91.71%				

The following candidates were elected: Lars Ahlmark (M); Ingrid Andersson (S); Birgitta Dahl (S); Arne Gadd (S); Sture Korpås (C); Rosa Östh (C); Gustav Persson (S); Oswald Söderqvist (VPK); Gunnar Thollander (S); Ingegerd Troedsson (M); and Jörgen Ullenhag (FP).

==== 1970s ====
===== 1979 =====
Results of the 1979 general election held on 16 September 1979:

Party		Votes per municipality						Total votes	%	Seats		
Party		Älvkar- leby	En- köping	Håbo	Öst- hammar	Tierp	Uppsala	Total votes	%	Con.	Lev.	Tot.
Swedish Social Democratic Party	S	4,742	8,554	2,720	6,091	7,628	35,418	65,153	42.34%	4	0	4
Centre Party	C	697	5,401	1,150	3,552	3,596	16,218	30,614	19.90%	2	0	2
Moderate Party	M	429	3,794	1,760	1,708	1,234	19,938	28,863	18.76%	2	0	2
Liberal People's Party	FP	436	1,632	715	934	1,202	11,496	16,415	10.67%	1	0	1
Left Party – Communists	VPK	319	570	309	474	337	8,147	10,156	6.60%	0	1	1
Christian Democratic Unity	KDS	41	207	48	149	261	1,050	1,756	1.14%	0	0	0
Communist Party of Sweden	SKP	0	41	8	8	2	283	342	0.22%	0	0	0
Workers' Party – The Communists	APK	0	5	7	32	2	175	221	0.14%	0	0	0
Other parties		2	38	17	15	11	263	346	0.22%	0	0	0
Valid votes		6,666	20,242	6,734	12,963	14,273	92,988	153,866	100.00%	9	1	10
Rejected votes		20	135	29	78	46	740	1,048	0.68%			
Total polled		6,686	20,377	6,763	13,041	14,319	93,728	154,914	90.72%			
Registered electors		7,200	22,727	7,284	14,476	15,529	103,542	170,758				
Turnout		92.86%	89.66%	92.85%	90.09%	92.21%	90.52%	90.72%				

The following candidates were elected: Lars Ahlmark (M); Sven Eric Åkerfeldt (C); Hans Alsén (S); Birgitta Dahl (S); Arne Gadd (S); Nils Hjorth (S); Sture Korpås (C); Oswald Söderqvist (VPK); Ingegerd Troedsson (M); and Jörgen Ullenhag (FP).

===== 1976 =====
Results of the 1976 general election held on 19 September 1976:

Party		Votes per municipality						Total votes	%	Seats		
Party		Älvkar- leby	En- köping	Håbo	Öst- hammar	Tierp	Uppsala	Total votes	%	Con.	Lev.	Tot.
Swedish Social Democratic Party	S	4,819	8,306	2,177	5,796	7,579	34,340	63,017	42.20%	4	0	4
Centre Party	C	880	6,568	1,404	3,873	3,908	20,774	37,407	25.05%	3	0	3
Moderate Party	M	325	2,875	979	1,294	1,022	14,897	21,392	14.33%	1	0	1
People's Party	F	391	1,630	638	856	1,244	12,048	16,807	11.26%	1	0	1
Left Party – Communists	VPK	266	529	204	428	292	6,318	8,037	5.38%	0	1	1
Christian Democratic Unity	KDS	41	219	34	170	302	1,052	1,818	1.22%	0	0	0
Communist Party of Sweden	SKP	5	27	8	13	7	581	641	0.43%	0	0	0
Other parties		0	6	0	0	1	199	206	0.14%	0	0	0
Valid votes		6,727	20,160	5,444	12,430	14,355	90,209	149,325	100.00%	9	1	10
Rejected votes		15	62	15	23	26	499	640	0.43%			
Total polled		6,742	20,222	5,459	12,453	14,381	90,708	149,965	91.28%			
Registered electors		7,169	22,306	5,891	13,722	15,482	99,728	164,298				
Turnout		94.04%	90.66%	92.67%	90.75%	92.89%	90.96%	91.28%				

The following candidates were elected: Sven Eric Åkerfeldt (C); Hans Alsén (S); Birgitta Dahl (S); Arne Gadd (S); Nils Hjorth (S); Sture Korpås (C); Oswald Söderqvist (VPK); Ingegerd Troedsson (M); Jörgen Ullenhag (F); and Britt Wigenfeldt (C).

===== 1973 =====
Results of the 1973 general election held on 16 September 1973:

Party		Votes per municipality						Total votes	%	Seats		
Party		Älvkar- leby	En- köping	Håbo	Öst- hammar	Tierp	Uppsala	Total votes	%	Con.	Lev.	Tot.
Swedish Social Democratic Party	S	4,681	8,139	1,752	5,282	7,445	32,791	60,090	42.96%	4	0	4
Centre Party	C	917	6,447	1,205	3,697	3,934	21,381	37,581	26.87%	2	1	3
Moderate Party	M	245	2,371	563	1,057	785	13,016	18,037	12.90%	1	0	1
People's Party	F	299	1,351	400	634	1,059	9,575	13,318	9.52%	1	0	1
Left Party – Communists	VPK	337	569	215	474	365	5,717	7,677	5.49%	0	0	0
Christian Democratic Unity	KDS	34	282	25	233	396	1,287	2,257	1.61%	0	0	0
Communist Party of Sweden	SKP	8	20	8	23	12	585	656	0.47%	0	0	0
Communist League Marxist–Leninists (the revolutionaries)	KFML(r)	3	4	0	4	4	165	180	0.13%	0	0	0
Other parties		1	2	0	0	0	75	78	0.06%	0	0	0
Valid votes		6,525	19,185	4,168	11,404	14,000	84,592	139,874	100.00%	8	1	9
Rejected votes		5	28	9	14	10	161	227	0.16%			
Total polled		6,530	19,213	4,177	11,418	14,010	84,753	140,101	90.36%			
Registered electors		7,040	21,462	4,500	12,699	15,166	94,176	155,043				
Turnout		92.76%	89.52%	92.82%	89.91%	92.38%	89.99%	90.36%				

The following candidates were elected: Sven Eric Åkerfeldt (C); Hans Alsén (S); Birgitta Dahl (S); Arne Gadd (S); Nils Hjorth (S); Sture Korpås (C); Ola Nyquist (F); Ingegerd Troedsson (M); and Britt Wigenfeldt (C).

===== 1970 =====
Results of the 1970 general election held on 20 September 1970:

Party		Votes per municipality															Total votes	%	Seats		
Party		Älvkar- leby	Danne- mora	En- köping	Håbo	Hällnäs	Öland	Öster- lovsta	Öst- hammar	Söder- fors	Tierp	Tierps- bygden	Uppsala	Väst- land	Vendel	Postal votes	Total votes	%	Con.	Lev.	Tot.
Swedish Social Democratic Party	S	4,361	1,224	7,530	1,327	498	2,055	555	2,026	1,231	1,637	834	27,997	917	1,328	6,662	60,182	45.84%	4	0	4
Centre Party	C	593	551	4,891	590	347	1,658	396	1,621	150	478	752	13,309	420	649	3,096	29,501	22.47%	2	0	2
People's Party	F	364	155	1,682	347	227	351	105	501	102	274	131	10,584	82	266	4,148	19,319	14.72%	1	0	1
Moderate Party	M	130	94	1,429	214	25	438	75	447	46	138	89	6,642	30	146	4,177	14,120	10.76%	1	0	1
Left Party – Communists	VPK	210	179	313	84	7	100	18	111	64	54	35	2,874	45	44	588	4,726	3.60%	0	0	0
Christian Democratic Unity	KDS	41	79	199	16	56	82	94	76	22	55	52	1,089	61	74	558	2,554	1.95%	0	0	0
Communist League Marxists-Leninists	KFML	26	1	31	3	0	11	1	10	6	3	1	563	8	2	192	858	0.65%	0	0	0
Other parties		0	0	0	0	0	0	0	0	0	1	0	3	0	0	18	22	0.02%	0	0	0
Valid votes		5,725	2,283	16,075	2,581	1,160	4,695	1,244	4,792	1,621	2,640	1,894	63,061	1,563	2,509	19,439	131,282	100.00%	8	0	8
Rejected votes		9	1	13	3	0	3	1	6	1	1	1	100	0	1	91	231	0.18%			
Total polled exc. postal votes		5,734	2,284	16,088	2,584	1,160	4,698	1,245	4,798	1,622	2,641	1,895	63,161	1,563	2,510	19,530	131,513				
Postal votes		734	237	2,573	314	67	414	149	474	246	383	134	13,400	154	261	-19,530	10				
Total polled inc. postal votes		6,468	2,521	18,661	2,898	1,227	5,112	1,394	5,272	1,868	3,024	2,029	76,561	1,717	2,771	0	131,523	87.71%			
Registered electors		7,092	2,717	21,456	3,267	1,312	5,895	1,533	6,245	1,994	3,327	2,353	87,822	1,848	3,088		149,949				
Turnout		91.20%	92.79%	86.97%	88.71%	93.52%	86.72%	90.93%	84.42%	93.68%	90.89%	86.23%	87.18%	92.91%	89.73%		87.71%				

The following candidates were elected: Sven Eric Åkerfeldt (C); Birgitta Dahl (S); Arne Gadd (S); Nils Hjorth (S); Sture Korpås (C); Blenda Ljungberg (M); John Lundberg (S); and Erik Tobé (F).
