= Emma Wallrup =

Swedish politician (born 1971)

Member of the Riksdag
- In office 1 July 2014 – 7 June 2018
- Preceded by: Jacob Johnson
- Succeeded by: Jeannette Escanilla
- Constituency: Uppsala County

Personal details
- Born: Emma Maria Wallrup; 1971 (age 54–55)
- Education: Swedish University of Agricultural Sciences

Emma Maria Wallrup (born 1971) is a Swedish politician and former member of the Riksdag, the national legislature. A former member of the Left Party, she represented Uppsala County between July 2014 and June 2018. She had previously been a substitute member of the Riksdag for Jacob Johnson between January 2012 and April 2012.

Wallrup is the daughter of theologian Inga Wallrup. She has a biology degree from the Swedish University of Agricultural Sciences (SLU). She worked for the Swedish Botanical Association (Svenska Botaniska Föreningen) from 2005 to 2007. From 2007 to 2009 she was a project manager for the Swedish Society for Nature Conservation's climate change campaign in Uppsala County. She worked at Swedish Society for Nature Conservation's Biotopia museum in Uppsala from 2009 to 2010. She was a summer guide at the University of Uppsala Botanical Garden from 2000 to 2012. She was a member of the municipal council in Uppsala Municipality between 2006 and 2010.

In February 2018, it was revealed that Left Party MP Jens Holm had reported Wallrup to the police for harassing him since 2012. Prosecutors however declined to investigate Holm's complaint as the evidence from the statute of limitations period - the previous two years - did not indicate any criminal offence had taken place. The Left Party leadership nevertheless excluded Wallrup from the party group in the Riksdag and forbade her from entering the party's offices in the Riksdag. Wallrup resigned from the Riksdag and the Left Party in June 2018 after party's Uppsala County branch voted to remove her from the top position on the party's list for the 2018 Swedish general election.
