= Kent Kumpula =

Swedish politician (born 1975)

Member of the Riksdag
- Incumbent
- Assumed office 26 November 2024
- Preceded by: Lars Wistedt
- Constituency: Uppsala County
- In office 1 April 2024 – 19 August 2024
- Preceded by: David Perez
- Succeeded by: David Perez
- Constituency: Uppsala County

Personal details
- Born: 12 August 1975 (age 50)
- Party: Sweden Democrats

Kent Kristian Kumpula (born 12 August 1975) is a Swedish politician serving as a member of the Riksdag since 2024. From 2022 to 2024, he served as chairman of the Sweden Democrats in the municipal council of Uppsala.
