= Ulrika Karlsson =

Ulrika Karlsson may refer to:

- Ulrika Karlsson (footballer)
- Ulrika Karlsson (politician)
