= Catarina Deremar =

Swedish politician (born 1965)

Member of the Riksdag
- Incumbent
- Assumed office 1 January 2021
- Constituency: Uppsala County

Personal details
- Born: 1965 (age 60–61)
- Party: Centre Party

Catarina Deremar (born 1965) is a Swedish politician. Since January 2021, she serves as a Member of the Riksdag representing the constituency of Uppsala County for the Centre Party. She became a member after Solveig Zander retired.

She was also elected as a Member of the Riksdag in September 2022.
