= Smedberg =

Smedberg or Smedburg may refer to:

== People ==
- Martin Smedberg (born 1984), Swedish football midfielder
- Jane Renwick Smedburg (1827–1913), American nurse and philanthropist
- Tobias Smedberg (born 1978), Swedish politician

== Education ==
- T.R. Smedberg Middle School, Sacramento, California
