= Stefan Olsson (politician) =

Swedish politician (born 1968)

Member of the Riksdag
- Incumbent
- Assumed office 2022
- Constituency: Uppsala County

Personal details
- Born: 16 August 1968 (age 58) Stockholm County, Sweden
- Party: Moderate Party
- Education: Uppsala University

Stefan Olsson (born 16 August 1968) is a Swedish political scientist, writer and moderate politician.

== Career ==
Olsson studied and received his doctorate in political science at Uppsala University.

He was active at the Swedish Defence Research Institute (FOI) and at the think tank Frivärld from 2012.

He became a county councillor (opposition councillor) in the county council of Uppsala County in February 2016.

In March 2017, he became group leader and regional councilor for the Moderate Party in the Uppsala Region and between November 2018 and June 2019, he was chairman of the regional board, when he was on sick leave.

Since the 2022 election, he has been a member of parliament for the Moderate Party in Uppsala County.

== Work ==
Olsson's scientific work has dealt with:

- Sweden's democratization and the role of the right-wing party during this period.
- Legal certainty in crisis management and Russian disinformation.
- Children's political rights.
- The European Union's crisis management system.
- Conservative ideological debate from a liberal-conservative perspective.

Alongside his scientific work, Olsson also works as a freelance writer. He is affiliated with Norrköpings Tidningar and Nya Wermlands-Tidningen.

== Bibliography ==
- 2000 – Den svenska högerns anpassning till demokratin. Skrifter utgivna av Statsvetenskapliga föreningen i Uppsala, n 136, Uppsala.
- 2002 – Att genomskåda världen: Metod och retorik hos Alvin Toffler och Manuel Castells. Santérus förlag, Stockholm.
- 2009 – Crisis Management in the European Union. Cooperation in the Face of Emergencies. Springer Verlag, Heidelberg.
- 2011 – Handbok i konservatism. Bokförlaget Atlantis, Stockholm.
- 2016 – Vilseledning. Kriget i Ukraina i svenska medier. Timbro, Stockholm.
- 2016 – Vapenexport för fred. Exilium, Storholmen.

== See also ==
- List of members of the Riksdag, 2022–2026
