= Markus Wiechel =

Swedish politician (born 1988)

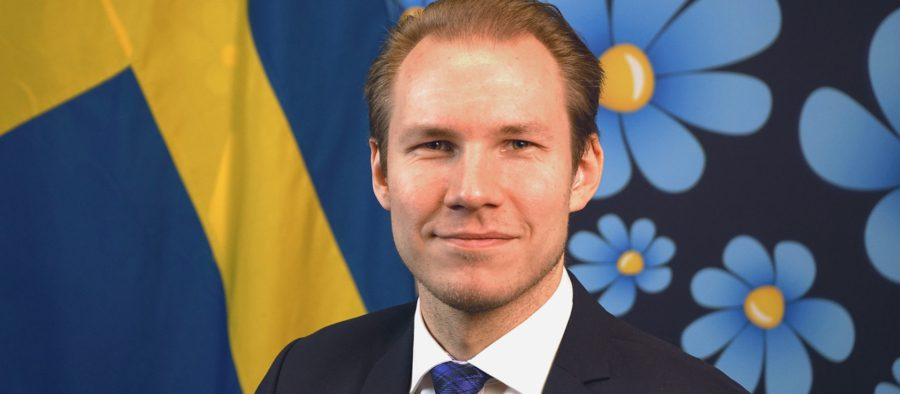
- Wiechel in a press photo

Member of the Riksdag
- Preceded by: Lars Isovaara
- Constituency: Västra Götaland North

Personal details
- Born: Gustaf Markus Wiechel; 15 April 1988 (age 38) Linköping, Sweden
- Party: Sweden Democrats (since 2007)
- Education: Linköping University
- Profession: Politician
- Awards: Medal of Honour of the National Assembly of Armenia Certificate of Appreciation by Taipei Mission in Sweden Award by Abdirahman Dahir Adam, Minister of Foreign Affairs and International Cooperation of Somaliland Riksdag Medal of the Twelfth Size by Swedish Speaker Andreas Norlén

Markus Wiechel (born 15 April 1988) is a Swedish politician of the Sweden Democrats. He has been a Member of Parliament (MP) of Sweden following the resignation of Lars Isovaara on 29 November 2012. He's currently serving as member for the Committee on Foreign Affairs as well as Deputy for the Committee on European Union Affairs. Wiechel is currently part of three international parliamentary delegations: NATO-PA as a deputy member, the OSCE-PA and the Parliamentary Assembly of the Council of Europe (PACE). Wiechel is the chairman of the Swedish PACE-delegation and holds the seat as vice president of the Assembly.

== Biography ==
Markus Wiechel graduated from Hickman High School (Columbia, Missouri) in 2007 and moved to his native Sweden to study Social Services at the University of Linköping but later graduated in Political Science. He is the son of Swedish author and ophthalmology expert Kristina Narfström who is a professor at the University of Missouri and the cousin of Swedish Social Democrats politician Björn Wiechel.

== Political life ==
Wiechel joined the Sweden Democrats shortly after moving back to Sweden. Wiechel was elected chairman of the Sweden Democrats in the city of Norrköping as well as the regional board in Östergötland in 2009. He left the local board in 2012 and the regional board in 2015, but was a member of the national board from 2011 to 2019.

In the elections of 2010 Wiechel was elected as a Member of Norrköping City Council where he worked as a Political Secretary and City Council Group Leader for the local Parliamentary group until 2013. He stayed as a member of the municipal Assembly in Norrköping until 2018 when he moved to Stockholm. Wiechel returned to local politics in 2023 when he entered as a deputy member of Nacka Municipal Assembly.

Following the resignation of Lars Isovaara on 29 November 2012, Wiechel assumed office as a regular member of parliament. In the Riksdag, Wiechel has been civil and housing policy spokesperson 2013–2014, migration and citizenship policy spokesperson 2014–2017 and foreign policy spokesperson 2016–2021. He has been a member of the Civil Affairs Committee (2013-2014), the Social Security Committee (2014-2016) and the Foreign Affairs Committee (since 2016). Aside from this he has served in several international delegations and holds, among other things, the position of chairman of the Swedish delegation to the Parliamentary Assembly of the Council of Europe since 2022. He was elected as a deputy in the Advisory Council on Foreign Affairs 2018–2022 and since 2022 is a member of the War Delegation.

After the successful results for the Sweden Democrats in the election of 2022, Wiechel became the first ever Sweden Democrat Chairman of the Swedish Delegation to the Parliamentary Assembly of the Council of Europe. He was also elected as vice president of the whole Parliamentary Assembly in January 2023.

On 17 July 2021 Wiechel was awarded the Medal of Honour of the National Assembly of Armenia presented by the Armenian ambassador to Sweden Alexander Arzoumanian. Wiechel was awarded the medal for his work on diplomatic relations between Armenia and Sweden.

== International delegations ==
Markus Wiechel has been a member of a couple of international delegations within the Swedish Parliament. In 2013-2014, he was a member of the Swedish delegation to the Nordic Council. In 2016, he took part as a member of the Swedish delegation to the Parliamentary Assembly of the Council of Europe (PACE), first as a deputy (2016-2018) and since 2018 as an ordinary member. Since 2022, he is the chairman of the Swedish PACE-delegation, first ever as a politician of the Sweden Democrats and in January 2023 he was elected vice president of the whole Assembly.

Aside from this, Wiechel is a deputy member of the Swedish delegation to NATO-PA and an ordinary member to the Swedish delegation to the OSCE-PA.

== Distinctions ==
- Medal of Honour of the National Assembly of Armenia, (Armenia).
- Certificate of Appreciation by the Taipei Mission in Sweden, (Taiwan)
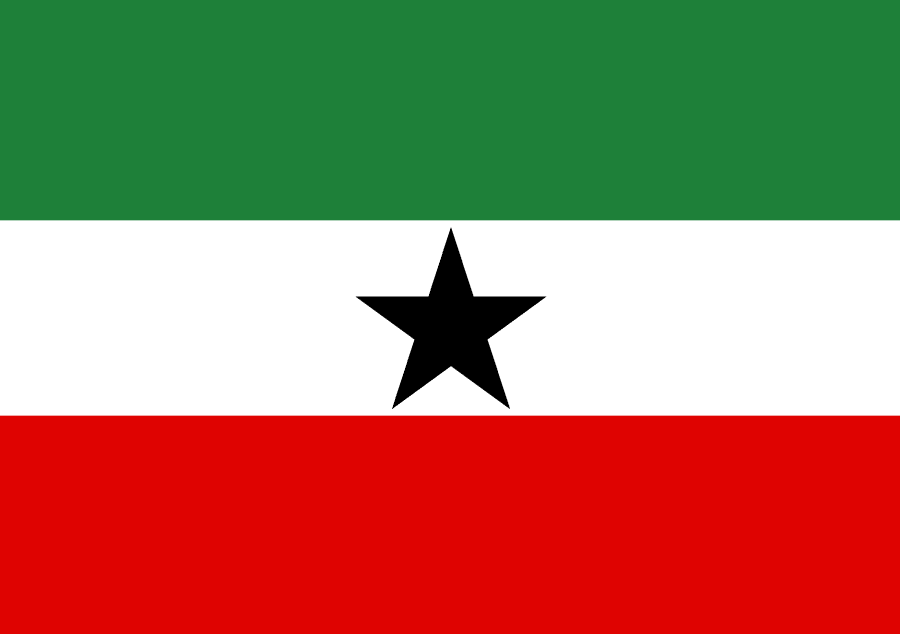
- Award by Abdirahman Dahir Adam, Minister of Foreign Affairs and International Cooperation of Somaliland (Somaliland)
- Riksdag Medal of the Twelfth Size by Swedish Speaker Andreas Norlén (Sweden)

== External pages ==
- Markus Wiechel Parliament of Sweden
