= Jeannette Escanilla =

Swedish politician (born 1961)

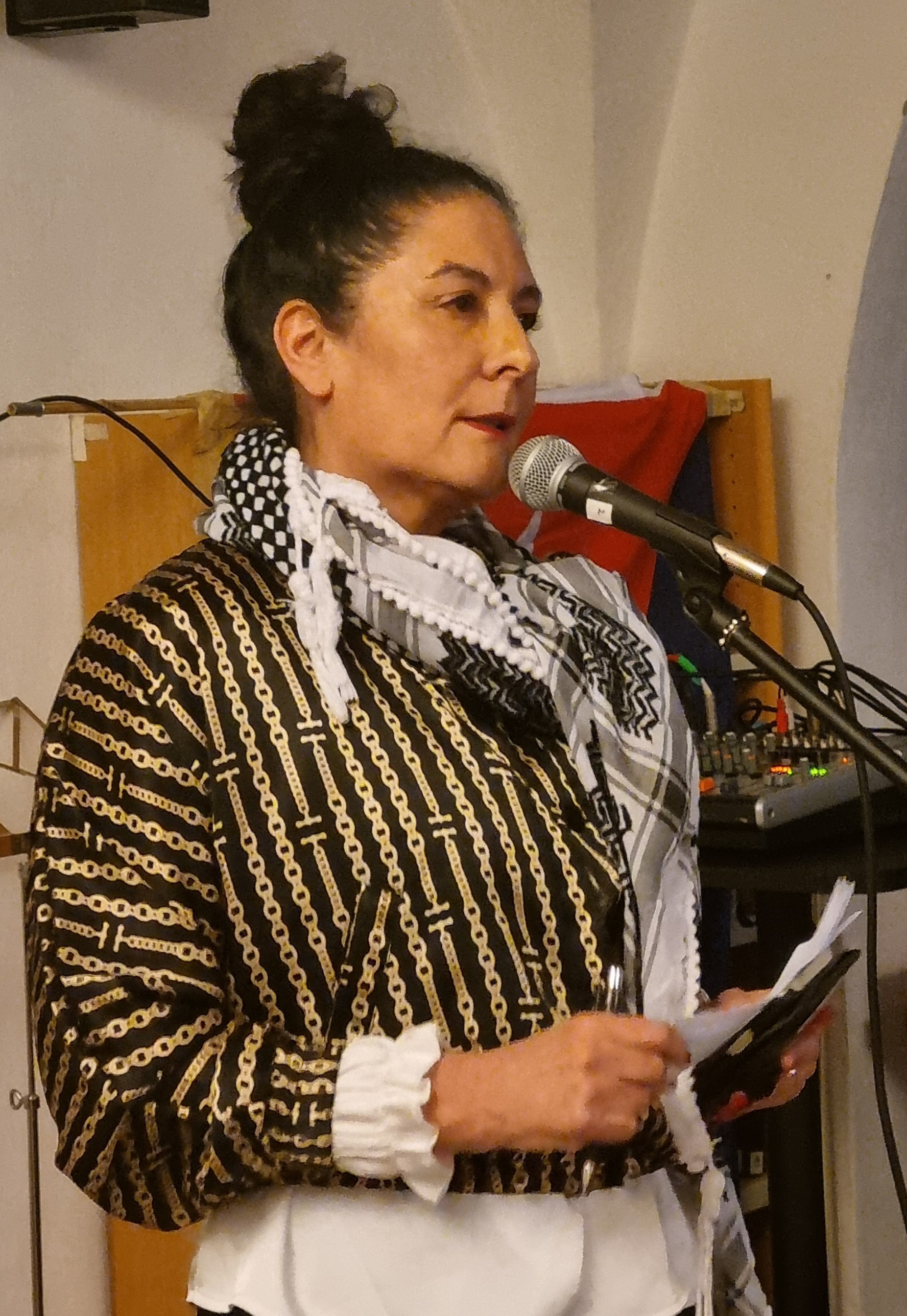
- Escanilla In March 2024

Member of the Riksdag
- In office 7 June 2018 – 24 September 2018
- Preceded by: Emma Wallrup
- Constituency: Uppsala County

Personal details
- Born: 1961 (age 64–65)
- Party: Left Party

Jeannette Escanilla Diaz (born 1961) is a Swedish politician and former member of the Riksdag, the national legislature. A member of the Left Party, she represented Uppsala County between June 2018 and September 2018.

Escanilla was president of the Ship to Gaza foundation. She was part of the Women's Boat to Gaza crew aboard the Zaytouna-Olivia that tried to break the Israeli naval blockade of the Gaza Strip in October 2016 but were intercepted by the Israelis in international waters and taken to Ashdod in Israel before being deported.
