= Gustaf Lantz =

Swedish politician (born 1981)

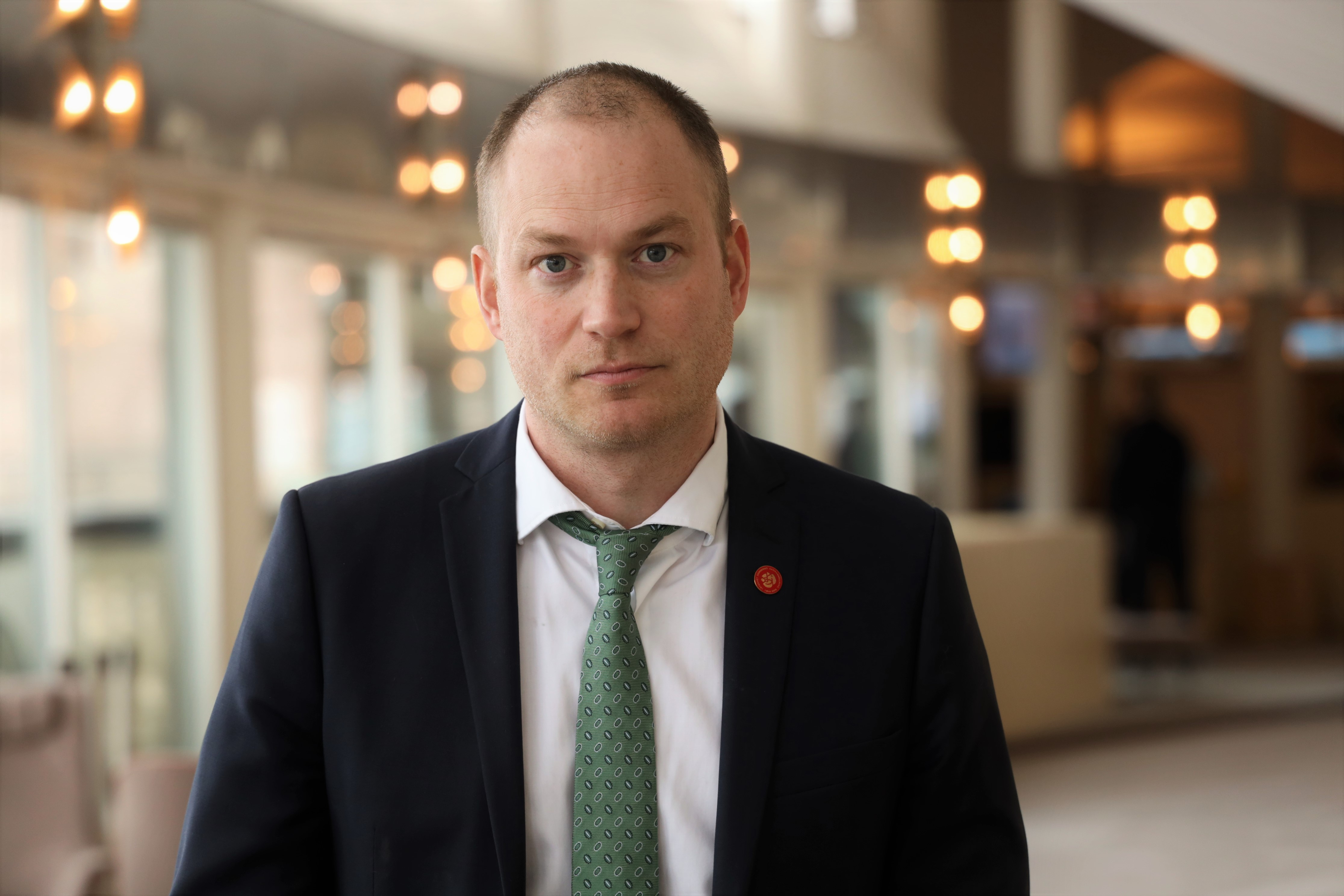
- Lantz in 2022

Member of the Riksdag
- Incumbent
- Assumed office 26 September 2022
- Constituency: Uppsala County

Personal details
- Born: Lars Gustaf Oscar Lantz; 1981 (age 44–45)
- Party: Social Democratic Party

Lars Gustaf Oscar Lantz (born 1981) is a Swedish politician and member of the Riksdag, the national legislature. A member of the Social Democratic Party, he has represented Uppsala County since September 2022. He had previously been a substitute member of the Riksdag for Ardalan Shekarabi three times: April 2017 to December 2017; September 2018 to August 2020; and December 2020 to September 2022.
