= Maria Weimer =

German-born Swedish politician (1979–2024)

Member of the Riksdag for Uppsala County
- In office 29 September 2014 – 24 September 2018

Personal details
- Born: Maria Eva Margareta Weimer; 25 June 1979 Landau, Rhineland-Palatinate, West Germany
- Died: 5 October 2024 (aged 45) Sveg, Sweden
- Party: L
- Education: Uppsala University
- Occupation: Diplomat

Maria Eva Maragareta Weimer (25 June 1979 – 5 October 2024) was a West German-born Swedish diplomat and politician. A member of the Liberals, she served in the Riksdag from 2014 to 2018.

Weimer died in Sveg in October 2024, at the age of 45.
