= Hugo E. G. Hamilton =

Swedish politician (1849–1928)

Count Hugo Hamilton RoKKMO
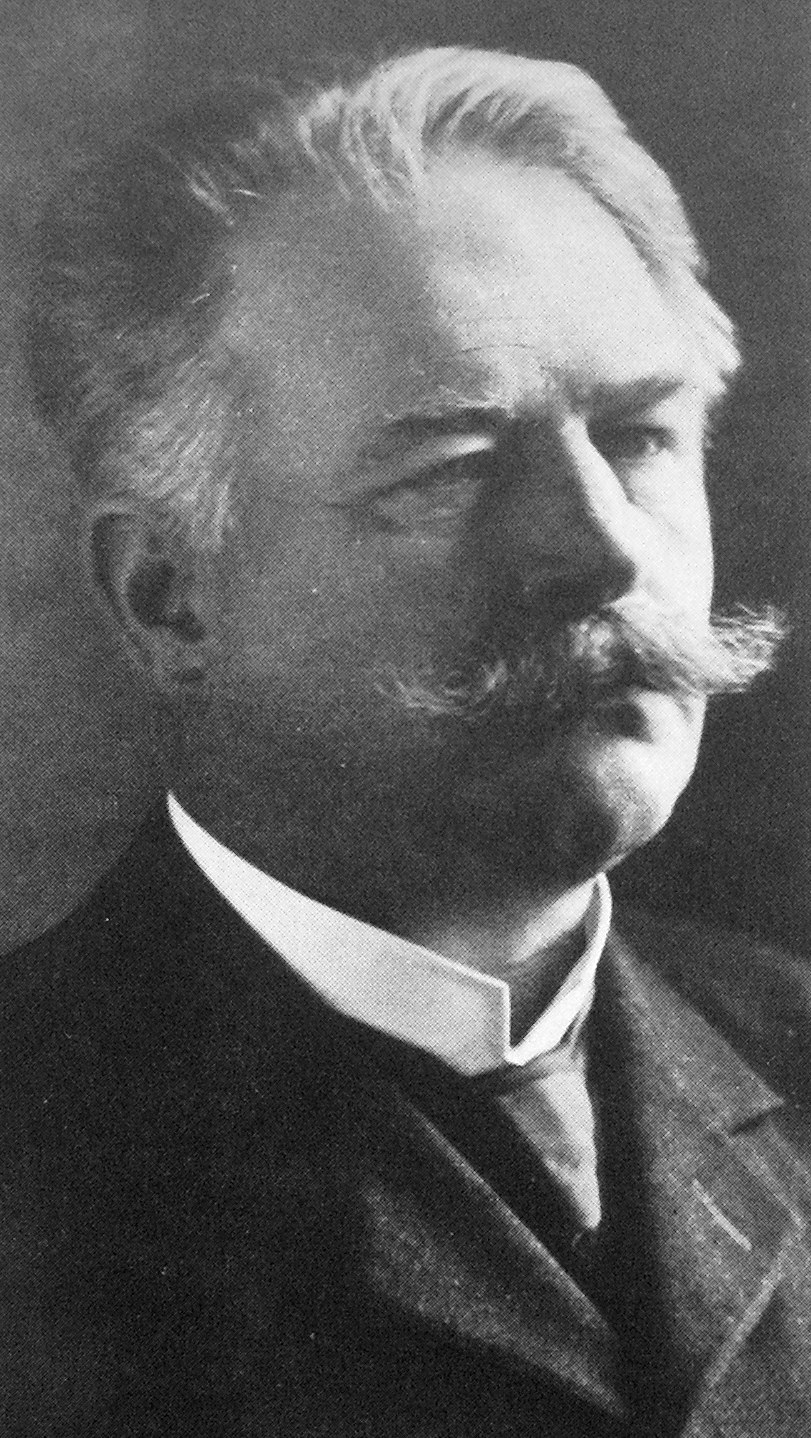

Minister for Civil Service Affairs
- In office 1907–1911
- Prime Minister: Gustaf V
- Preceded by: Julius Juhlin
- Succeeded by: Axel Schotte

Speaker of Första kammaren
- In office 1916–1928
- Monarch: Gustaf V
- Preceded by: Ivar Afzelius
- Succeeded by: Axel Vennersten

Governor of Gävleborg County
- In office 31 March 1900 – 18 September 1918
- Preceded by: Theodor Odelberg
- Succeeded by: Carl Mathias Ström (acting)

Member of Andra kammaren for City of Stockholm
- In office 1891–1893
- In office 1897–1901

Member of Första kammaren for City of Gävle and Älvsborg County
- In office 1900–1928

Personal details
- Born: Hugo Erik Gustaf Hamilton; 21 August 1849 Blomberg Husaby, Sweden
- Died: 27 January 1928 (aged 78) Karbenning, Sweden
- Party: Moderate Party of the Upper House; National Party
- Spouse: Elvine Åkerhielm af Blombacka
- Education: Uppsala University

Count Hugo Erik Gustaf Hamilton RoKKMO (21 August 1849 – 27 January 1928) was a Swedish politician, Minister for Civil Service Affairs between 1907–1921 and the eight Speaker of Första kammaren of the Riksdag.

== Biography ==
Hugo Erik Gustaf Hamilton was born on 21 August 1849 on Blomberg, Husaby, Skaraborg County to county governor count Adolf Ludvig Hamilton and Johanna Ulrika Agnes Geijer. He took his jurist grade from Uppsala University in 1878. He was a member of the city council of City of Stockholm in 1888—1893 and 1896—1900 Hamilton was a member of Andra kammaren in 1891–1893 and 1897–1901. On 31 March 1900, he became Governor of Gävleborg County, which he was until 18 September 1918. Between 4 December 1907 and 7 October 1911, Hamilton was Minister for Civil Service Affairs in Sweden. Hamilton became a member of Första kammaren in 1908. Speaker of Första kammaren of the Riksdag from 1916 to his death in 1928. Hamilton died on 27 January 1928 on Högfors bruk, Karbenning, Värmland County.

== Family ==
On 8 September 1881 in Högfors, Hamilton married countess Elvine Åkerhielm af Blombacka, daughter of county governor count Hans Samuel Knut Åkerhielm af Blombacka and Maria Ulrika Josefina Björkman.
