= Pyry Niemi =

Swedish politician (born 1965)

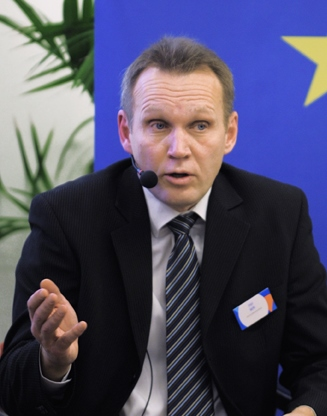

Member of the Riksdag
- Incumbent
- Assumed office 4 October 2010
- Constituency: Uppsala County

Personal details
- Born: 1965 (age 60–61)
- Party: Social Democrats

Pyry Niemi (born 1965) is a Swedish politician. As of 4 October 2010, he serves as Member of the Riksdag representing the constituency of Uppsala County. He is of Finnish descent and is fluent in Finnish.

He serves as the President of the Baltic Sea Parliamentary Conference 2020-2021.

He previously worked as a sales manager.
