= Mikael Oscarsson =

Swedish politician (born 1967)

Mikael Oscarsson KD
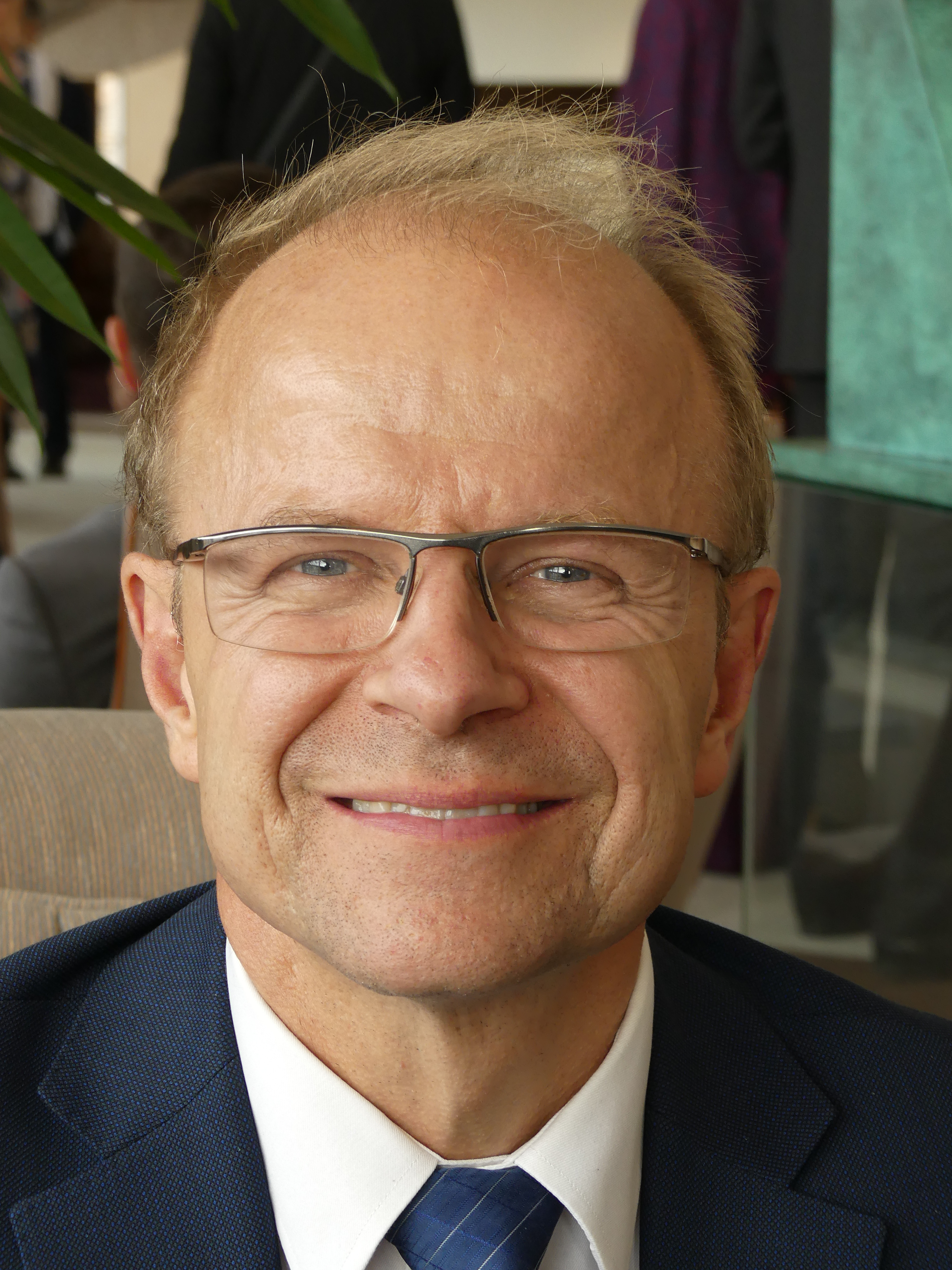
- Oscarsson in 2016

Member of the Swedish Parliament for Uppsala County
- Incumbent
- Assumed office 1998

Personal details
- Born: 22 April 1967 (age 59) Ödeshög, Ödeshög Municipality, Östergötland County, Sweden
- Party: Christian Democrats
- Spouse: Natalie Serko (m. 2020)
- Children: 4
- Profession: Politician, project leader

Carl Robert Mikael Oscarsson, (born April 22, 1967) in Ödeshög in Östergötland County, is a Swedish politician for the Christian Democratic party. He's been a member for the Swedish Riksdag since 1998, taking up the number 28 seat for Uppsala County constituency.

== Career ==
Oscarsson lives in Almunge outside Uppsala. Besides his role as an MP of the Riksdag, Oscarsson is district chairman for the Christian Democrats for Uppsala County. Among his committee assignments in the Riksdag, he has been a member of the Committee on Defence since 2010 and, a member of the Committee on Industry and Trade between the years of 2006 and 2010. Oscarsson studied economics and attended an American high school.

In 1991, Oscarsson founded the organization Ja till Livet (Yes to life) to which he was the president for from 1991 and 1997. Ja till Livet was primarily focused on enforcing abortion laws. In addition, for many years, Oscarsson has been a member of Livets Ord (Word of Life). He was voted into the Riksdag by an open list vote in the 1998 general election. His presidency for Ja till Livet was noticed in 1998, and he was asked to resign as president by the leader of the Christian Democratic leader Alf Svensson, which he also chose to do. Today he is the vice-president in the Riksdag association Forum för familj och människovärde (Forum for family and human dignity), board member in the Swedish Evangelical Alliance, and he was the chairman for Almunge IK for six years.

During his in the Riksdag, Oscarsson has among many other things, worked on strengthening the defense and worked for increased state aid purchases from the defense industry and claimed that the Alliance government's politics would lead to "a winding up of the Swedish defense industry".

He has profiled himself in family and human rights issues. He has engaged himself in questions surrounding custody allowance, right to deduct for gifts to non-profit organizations, and rural issues. He has been very forth pushing to institute Raoul Wallenberg's day as a memorial day. He began the Motion in 2001, and 2013 the day was celebrated for the first time. He is the president of the association "The memory of the Holocaust" which, each year, holds a memorial day of the Holocaust in the Riksdag.

== Private life ==
Oscarsson has been married with Natalie Oscarsson (her maiden name is Serko) since August 8, 2020. He had four children with his first wife who died in 2017. His brother, Magnus Oscarsson is also a Member of the Riksdag for the Christian Democrats.
