= Mats Berglind =

Swedish politician (1952–2016)

Member of the Riksdag
- In office 5 October 1998 – 4 October 2010
- Constituency: Uppsala County

Personal details
- Born: 1952
- Died: 23 September 2016 (aged 64)
- Party: Social Democratic Party

Mats Berglind (1952 – 23 September 2016) was a Swedish politician and member of the Riksdag, the national legislature. A member of the Social Democratic Party, he represented Uppsala County between October 1998 and October 2010. He was also a substitute member of the Riksdag for Thomas Östros between March 1996 and October 1998. He died on 23 September 2016 aged 64.
