= Ylva Stadell =

Swedish politician (born 1982)

Member of the Riksdag
- Incumbent
- Assumed office 28 September 2026
- Constituency: Uppsala County

Personal details
- Born: 1982 (age 43–44) Uppsala, Sweden
- Party: Social Democratic Party

Ylva Stadell (born 1982) is a Swedish politician and Member of the Riksdag. A member of the Social Democratic Party, she has represented Uppsala County since September 2026.

Stadell was born in 1982 in Uppsala. She is a trade union representative.

Stadell was a member of the municipal council in Uppsala . She was elected to the Riksdag at the 2026 general election.
