= Per Bill =

Swedish politician of the Moderate Party

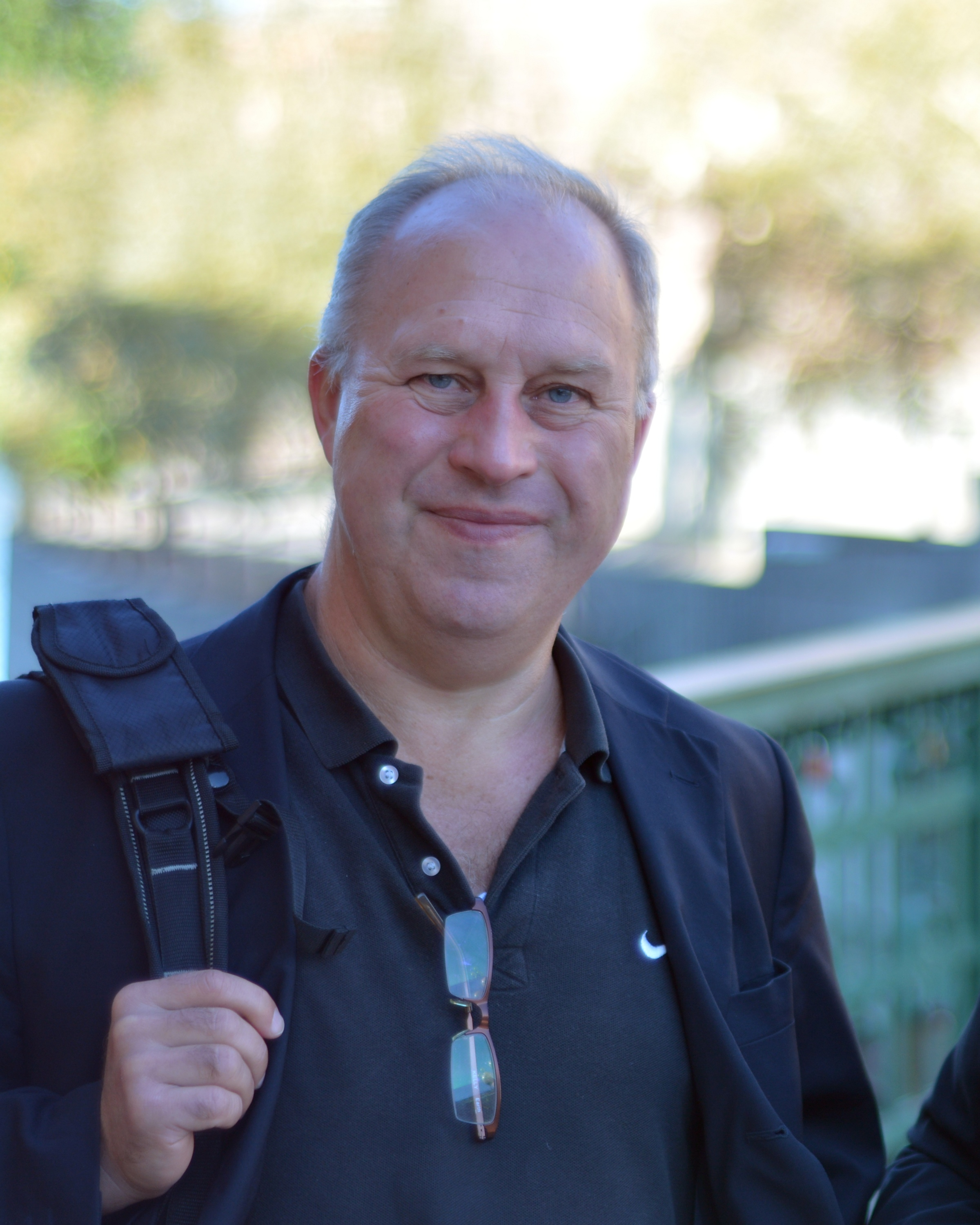

Governor of Gävleborg County
- In office 1 August 2015 – 31 July 2024
- Appointed by: Stefan Löfven
- Preceded by: Barbro Holmberg
- Succeeded by: Veronica Lauritzsen (acting)

Member of the Riksdag
- In office 3 October 1994 – 31 July 2015
- Constituency: Uppsala County

Personal details
- Born: 13 February 1958 (age 68) Stockholm, Sweden
- Party: Moderate Party
- Relations: Karin Enström (sister-in-law); Henrik Landerholm (brother-in-law)
- Education: Stockholm University; Stockholm School of Economics
- Occupation: Politician, Major

Per Anders Otto Bill (born 13 February 1958) is a Swedish politician of the Moderate Party who served as Governor of Gävleborg County from 2015 to 2024. He was a member of the Riksdag from 1994 to 2015. Eisenhower Fellowships selected Per Bill in 1999 to represent Sweden. He is brother-in-law of Karin Enström, the former Minister for Defence, and Henrik Landerholm, the former National Security Advisor to the Government of Sweden.
