= David Perez (Swedish politician) =

Swedish politician (born 1990)

Member of the Swedish Riksdag for Uppsala
- Incumbent
- Assumed office 1 March 2021

Personal details
- Born: 26 June 1990 (age 36) Täby, Sweden
- Party: Sweden Democrats
- Education: University of Groningen

David Alexander Perez (born 26 June 1990) is a Swedish politician. He is currently a Sweden Democratic member of the Swedish Riksdag for Uppsala.

== Biography ==
Perez was born in 1990. He spent part of his upbringing in Spain where he attended the Scandinavian School in Madrid before graduating with a degree in economics from Uppsala University and business administration at the University of Groningen in the Netherlands. After graduating he worked as an IT consultant.

Perez was a political secretary for the Sweden Democrats in Uppsala. In 2020, he was appointed to the Riksdag to take over from Paula Bieler but went on leave for a year following a dispute with the Swedish Tax Agency but was able to take his seat a year later. In the Riksdag, he is a member of the Business Committee, the Tax Committee, and the Traffic Committee.
