= Jacob Risberg =

Swedish politician (born 1972)

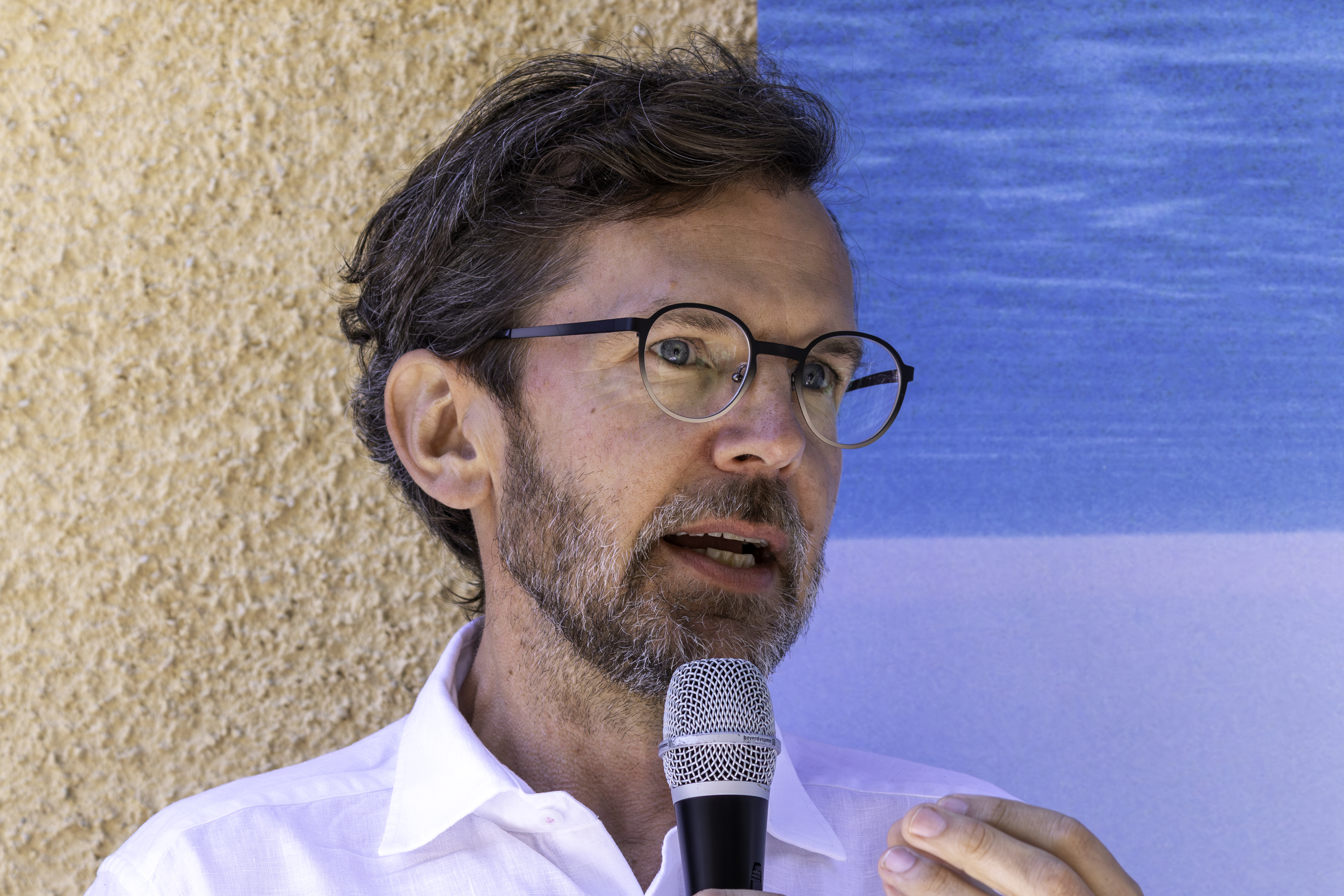
- Jacob Risberg in 2026

Member of the Riksdag
- Incumbent
- Assumed office 26 September 2022
- Constituency: Uppsala County

Personal details
- Born: 1972 (age 53–54)
- Party: Green Party

Jacob Risberg (born 1972) is a Swedish politician. He was elected as Member of the Riksdag in September 2022. He represents the constituency of Uppsala County. He is affiliated with the Green Party.
