= Ilona Szatmári Waldau =

Swedish politician (born 1962)

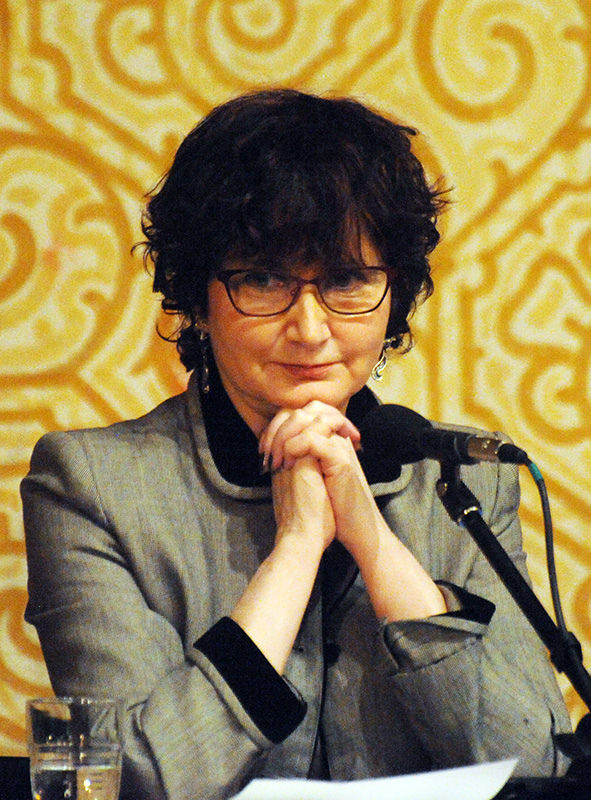
- Szatmári Waldau in 2015

Member of the Riksdag
- Incumbent
- Assumed office 24 September 2018
- Constituency: Uppsala County

Personal details
- Born: 1962 (age 63–64)
- Party: Left Party

Ilona Szatmári Waldau (born 1962) is a Swedish politician. Since September 2018, she serves as Member of the Riksdag representing the constituency of Uppsala County. She was also elected as Member of the Riksdag in September 2022. She is affiliated with the Left Party.
