= List of governors of Gävleborg County =

List of Swedish officials

Governor of Gävleborg County
- Landshövding i Gävleborgs län
- Coat of arms of Gävleborg County.

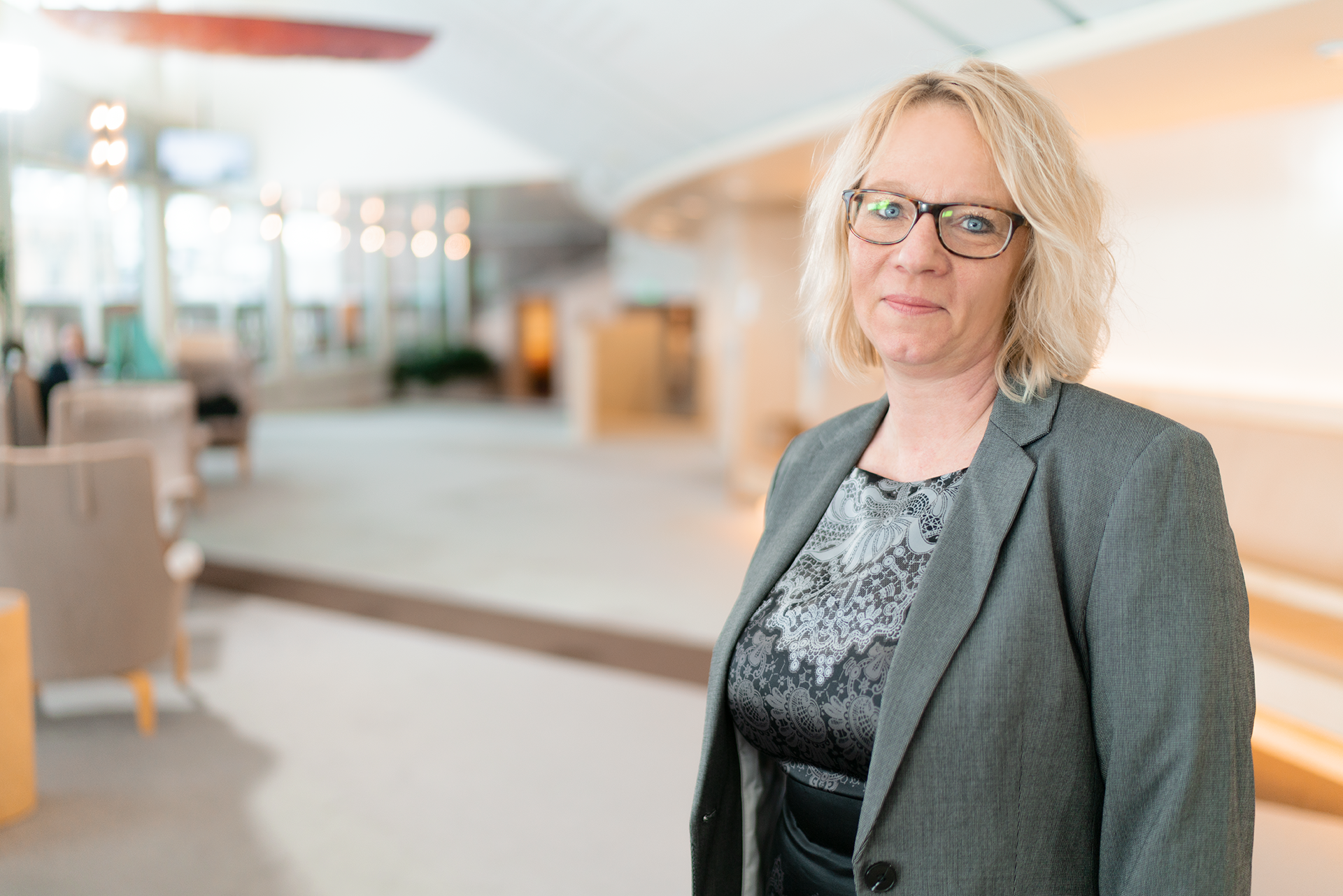
- Incumbent; Carina Ståhl Herrstedt since 1 March 2025
- Gävleborg County Administrative Board
- Residence: Gävle Castle, Gävle
- Appointer: Government of Sweden
- Term length: Six years (Note: The governor is often appointed for a six-year mandate. It can be extended if the person has not reached retirement age.)
- Formation: 1762
- First holder: Fredrik Henrik Sparre
- Deputy: County Director (Länsrådet)
- Salary: SEK 97,800/month (2017)
- Website: Governor Per Bill

This is a list of governors for Gävleborg County of Sweden, from 1762 to present.

1. Fredrik Henrik Sparre (1762–1763)
2. Carl Sparre (1763–1772)
3. Nils Philip Gyldenstolpe (1773–1781)
4. Fredrik Adolf Ulrik Cronstedt (1781–1812)
5. Salomon von Rajalin (1812–1813)
6. Erik Samuel Sparre (1813–1843)
7. Lars Magnus Lagerheim (1843–1853)
8. Lars Adolf Prytz (1853–1861)
9. Gustaf Ferdinand Asker (1861–1883)
10. Carl Adolf Theodor Björkman (1883–1899)
11. Albrecht Theodor Odelberg (1899–1900)
12. Hugo Erik Gustaf Hamilton (1900–1918)
13. August Robert Hagen (1918–1922)
14. Sven Edvard Julius Lübeck (1922–1941)
15. Rickard Sandler (1941–1950)
16. Elon Andersson (1950–1954)
17. John Lingman (1954–1962)
18. Jarl Hjalmarson (1962–1971)
19. Hans Hagnell (1971–1986)
20. Lars Ivar Hising (1986–1992)
21. Lars Eric Ericsson (1992–2002)
22. Christer Eirefelt (2003–2008)
23. Barbro Holmberg (2008–2015)
24. Per Bill (2015–2024)
25. Veronica Lauritzsen (acting; 2024–2025)
26. Carina Ståhl Herrstedt (2025–present)
