= Lars Wistedt =

Swedish politician (1964–2024)

Member of the Riksdag
- In office 11 September 2022 – 25 November 2024
- Succeeded by: Kent Kumpula
- Constituency: Uppsala County

Personal details
- Born: Lars Magnus Wistedt; 3 March 1964 Hässelby Strand, Sweden
- Died: 25 November 2024 (aged 60) Canada
- Party: Sweden Democrats
- Education: Swedish Defence University

Military service
- Allegiance: Sweden
- Branch: Swedish Army
- Unit: Command and Control Regiment

Lars Magnus Wistedt (3 March 1964 – 25 November 2024) was a Swedish military officer, security specialist and politician of the Sweden Democrats party who was a member of the Riksdag between 2022 and 2024 representing the Uppsala County constituency.

== Life and career ==
Wistedt was born on 3 March 1964. He was a graduate of the Swedish Defence University after which he joined the Royal Swedish Army as an officer. He subsequently served as an intelligence officer with the Command and Control Regiment specialising in foreign operations. After leaving the military, he worked as a security consultant in various countries including Africa and the Middle East.

He first became active for the SD in Haga where he sat on the party's executive board and focused on matters related to tax and education. For the 2022 Swedish general election, Wistedt stood as a candidate for the party in the Uppsala County constituency and was elected to the Riksdag. He held Seat 287 in parliament. In the Riksdag he served on the committees for defense, education and the constitution.

Wistedt died on 25 November 2024, at the age of 60, while traveling with a NATO delegation in Canada. His Riksdag seat was taken over by Kent Kumpula.

== See also ==
- List of members of the Riksdag, 2022–2026
