= Åsa Andersson =

Swedish politician (born 1971)

Member of the Riksdag
- Incumbent
- Assumed office 28 September 2026
- Constituency: Uppsala County

Personal details
- Born: 1971 (age 54–55) Uppsala, Sweden
- Party: Social Democratic Party

Åsa Carina Andersson (born 1971) is a Swedish politician and Member of the Riksdag. A member of the Social Democratic Party, she has represented Uppsala County since September 2026.

Andersson was born in 1971 in Uppsala. She trained as a childcare worker and worked in the disability services sector since 2010. She is a trade union representative for the Swedish Municipal Workers' Union (Kommunal).

Andersson was a member of the municipal council in Enköping. She was elected to the Riksdag at the 2026 general election.
