= Hans Alsén =

Swedish politician (1926–2023)

Member of the Riksdag for Uppsala County
- In office 10 January 1974 – 4 October 1982

Governor of Uppsala County
- In office 1986–1992
- Preceded by: Ingemar Mundebo
- Succeeded by: Jan-Erik Wikström

Personal details
- Born: Hans Olof Alsén; 16 August 1926 Enköping parish, Uppsala County, Sweden
- Died: 1 February 2023 (aged 96) Uppsala domkyrkodistrikt, Uppsala County, Sweden
- Party: S

Hans Olof Alsén (16 August 1926 – 1 February 2023) was a Swedish politician. A member of the Social Democratic Party, he served in the Riksdag from 1974 to 1982 and was Governor of Uppsala County from 1986 to 1992.

Alsén died in Uppsala Municipality on 1 February 2023, at the age of 96.
