= Fredrik Ahlstedt (politician) =

Swedish politician

Member of the Riksdag
- Incumbent
- Assumed office 2022
- Constituency: Uppsala County

Personal details
- Born: 17 February 1968 (age 58) Örebro, Sweden
- Party: Moderate Party

Sven Fredrik Arnold Ahlstedt (born 17 February 1968) is a Swedish politician from the Moderate Party, who has been a member of the Riksdag since 2022. He was raised in Enköping and has lived in Uppsala since 2004.

Ahlstedt was a municipal councilor and first deputy chairman of the municipal board in Enköping Municipality between 1998 and 2002. He was then a municipal councilor in Uppsala Municipality between 2012 and 2022, and chairman of the municipal board from 2012 to 2014. He succeeded Gunnar Hedberg.

Ahlstedt did not stand for re-election in the 2022 municipal elections, but instead ran for the Riksdag in the 2022 Swedish general election. He was not elected, but was appointed as a substitute minister when Jessika Roswall became Minister for EU Affairs in October 2022. Since August 2024, he has been a regular member. In the Riksdag, he is a member of the Committee on Taxation.

== See also ==
- List of members of the Riksdag, 2022–2026
