= Tobias Smedberg =

Swedish politician (born 1978)

Member of the Riksdag
- Incumbent
- Assumed office 28 September 2026
- Constituency: Uppsala County

Personal details
- Born: 1978 (age 47–48)
- Party: Left Party

Tobias Björn Mikael Smedberg (born 1978) is a Swedish politician for the Left Party. He has been a member of the Riksdag since 2026, elected for the Uppsala County constituency. He was a municipal councilor for the Left Party in Uppsala Municipality since 2018.

Since the 2022 elections, when the Left Party achieved a record-breaking election result in the municipal elections in Uppsala Municipality he has been First Deputy Chairman of the Municipal Executive Board In the red-green board of the municipality, he is a municipal councilor with responsibility for social policy, sports issues, national minorities and housing and social issues. He is also chairman of Uppsala Municipality's elderly committee, gender equality council and municipal pensioners' council.

Smedberg is the chairman of the committee for primary care and elderly care at the Swedish Association of Local Authorities and Regions, SKR, for the 2022–2026 term.

Before Smedberg became a full-time politician in 2018, he was a consultant at the values-driven public relations agency that he co-founded in 2007.

Smedberg was chairman of the Umeå Student Union in 2002–2003 and of the Swedish National Union of Students (SFS) in 2004–2005.

In the 2026 Swedish general election, Smedberg was elected to the Riksdag for the Uppsala County constituency.

== See also ==
- List of members of the Riksdag, 2026–2030
