= Jacob Johnson (Swedish politician) =

Swedish politician (born 1948)

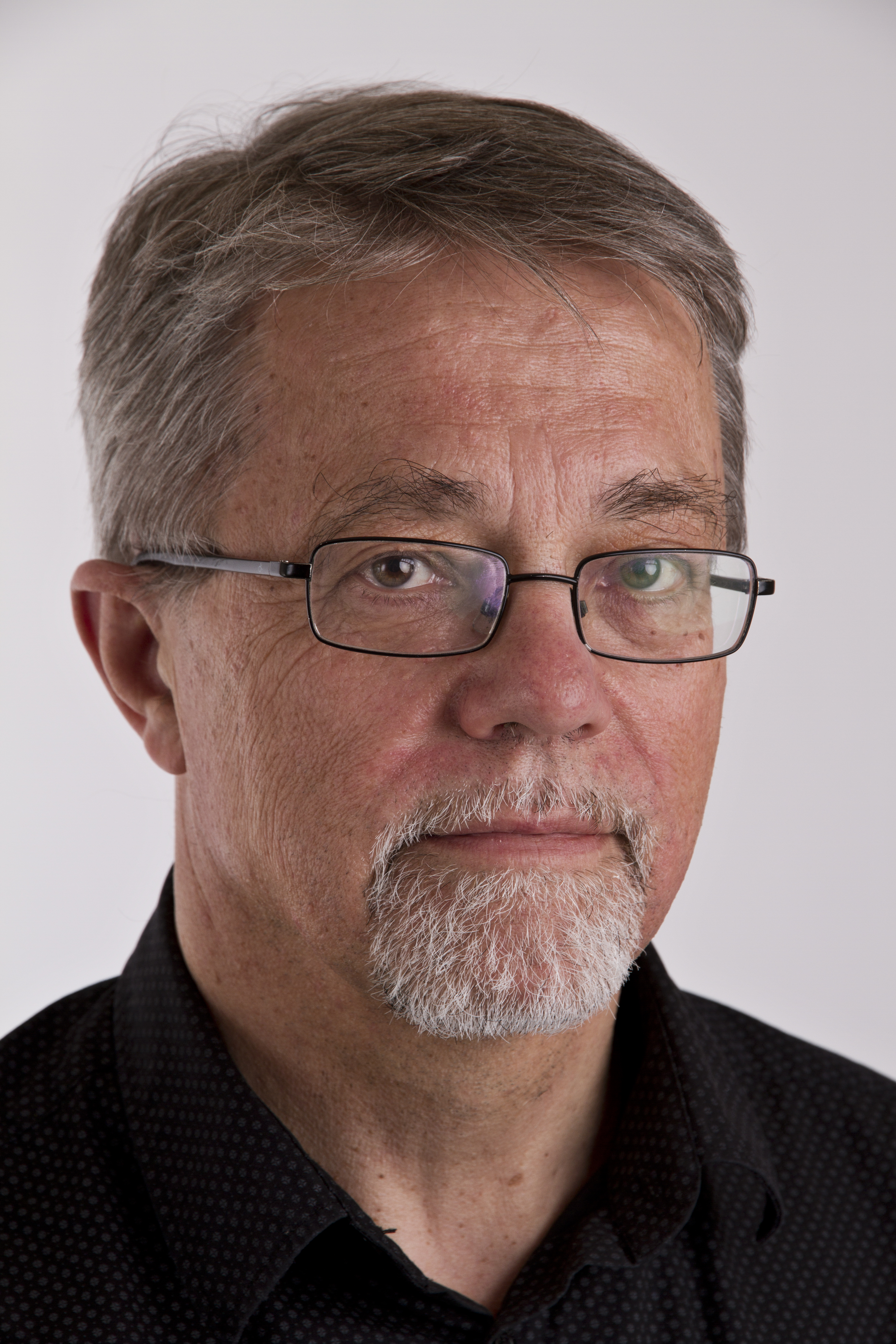
- Johnson in May 2010

Member of the Riksdag
- In office 2 October 2006 – 30 June 2014
- Constituency: Uppsala County

Personal details
- Born: 1948 (age 77–78)
- Party: Left Party

Axel Jacob Vigen Johnson (born 1948) is a Swedish politician and former member of the Riksdag, the national legislature. A member of the Left Party, he represented Uppsala County between October 2006 and June 2014.
