= Solveig Zander =

Swedish politician (born 1955)

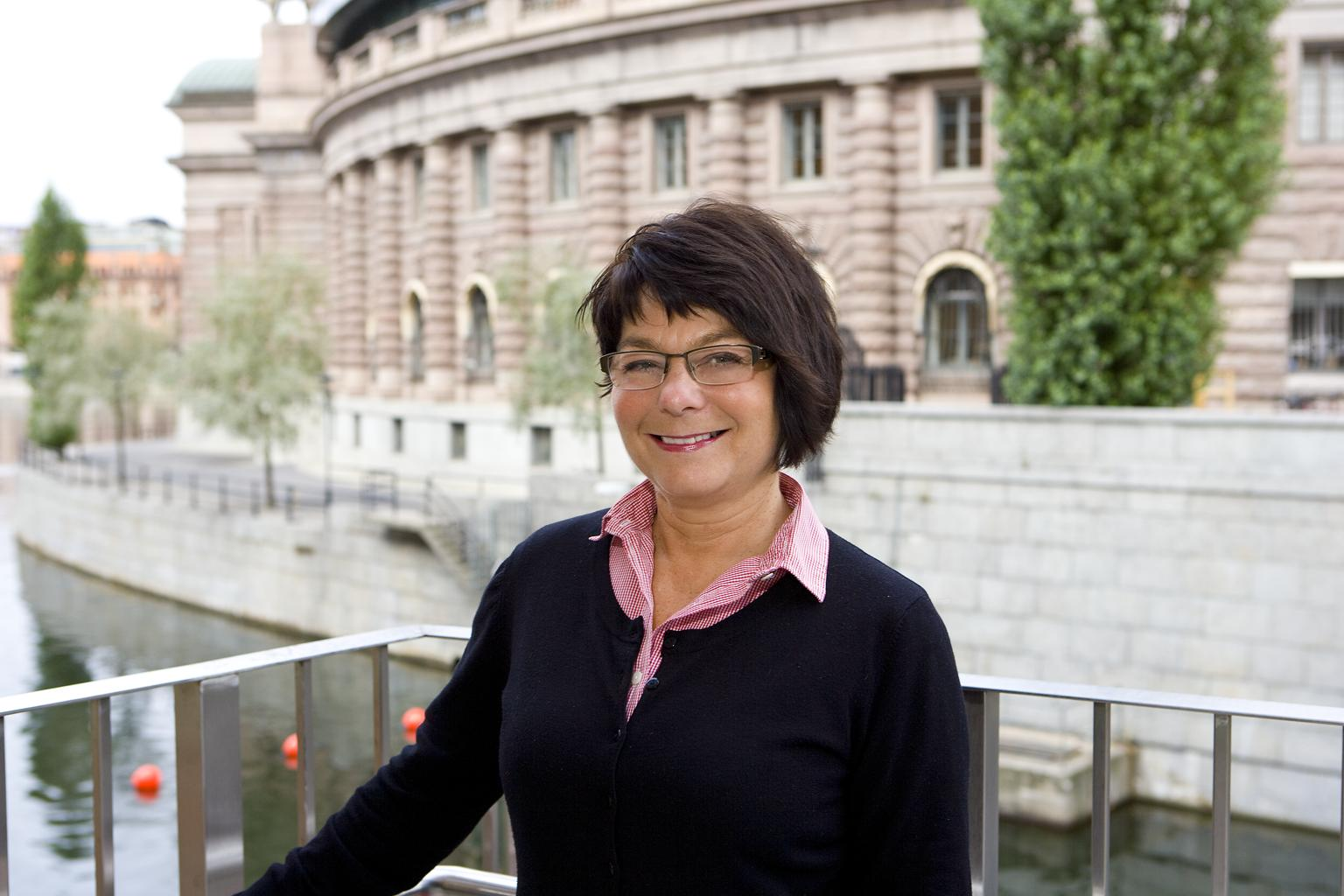

Member of the Swedish Parliament for Uppsala County
- In office 2006–2020

Personal details
- Born: 15 February 1955 (age 71)
- Party: Centre Party

Solveig Zander (born 1955) is a Swedish Centre Party politician. She served as a member of the Riksdag from 2006 to 2020.
