= Ingegerd Troedsson =

Swedish politician (1929–2012)

Ingegerd Troedsson (5 June 1929 – 3 November 2012) was a Swedish Moderate Party politician. She served as the first female Speaker of the Riksdag, in 1991. She was deputy chairman of the party until 1993.

== Life ==
She was born in Vaxholm and grew up around Stockhholm, moving around as her father was an officer. She graduated from school in Saltsjöbaden in 1947, and gained a master's degree in political science at Stockholm högskola (later Stockholm University). Troedsson married Tryggve Troedsson in 1949, he went on to become a professor of forestry. They had six children together, and Troedsson stayed at home to look after them for fifteen years. Her experience with how the tax system discouraged her from working outside the home gave her an enduring interest in issues and policies affecting women. In 1954, she set up a women's association in Norra Trögd, of which she was chair until 1991.

Troedsson was elected to the Riksdag in 1974. She was a Swedish Moderate Party politician. She had a junior role in the non-socialist government of 1976, as deputy Minister for Social Affairs 1976–78. In 1979 she was elected vice speaker of the Riksdag, a post she held until 1991 when, after the Moderate election victory, she was elected the first female speaker of the Swedish Riksdag.

She was a candidate for party leader in 1986 – after Ulf Adelsohn had resigned – but lost to Carl Bildt. Instead, she was elected deputy chairman – a position she held until 1993.

Troedsson died in 2012 and is buried in the Hacksta cemetery.

Political offices
Preceded by Thage G. Peterson	Speaker of the Riksdag; 1991–1994	Succeeded by Birgitta Dahl
