= Agneta Gille =

Swedish politician (born 1956)

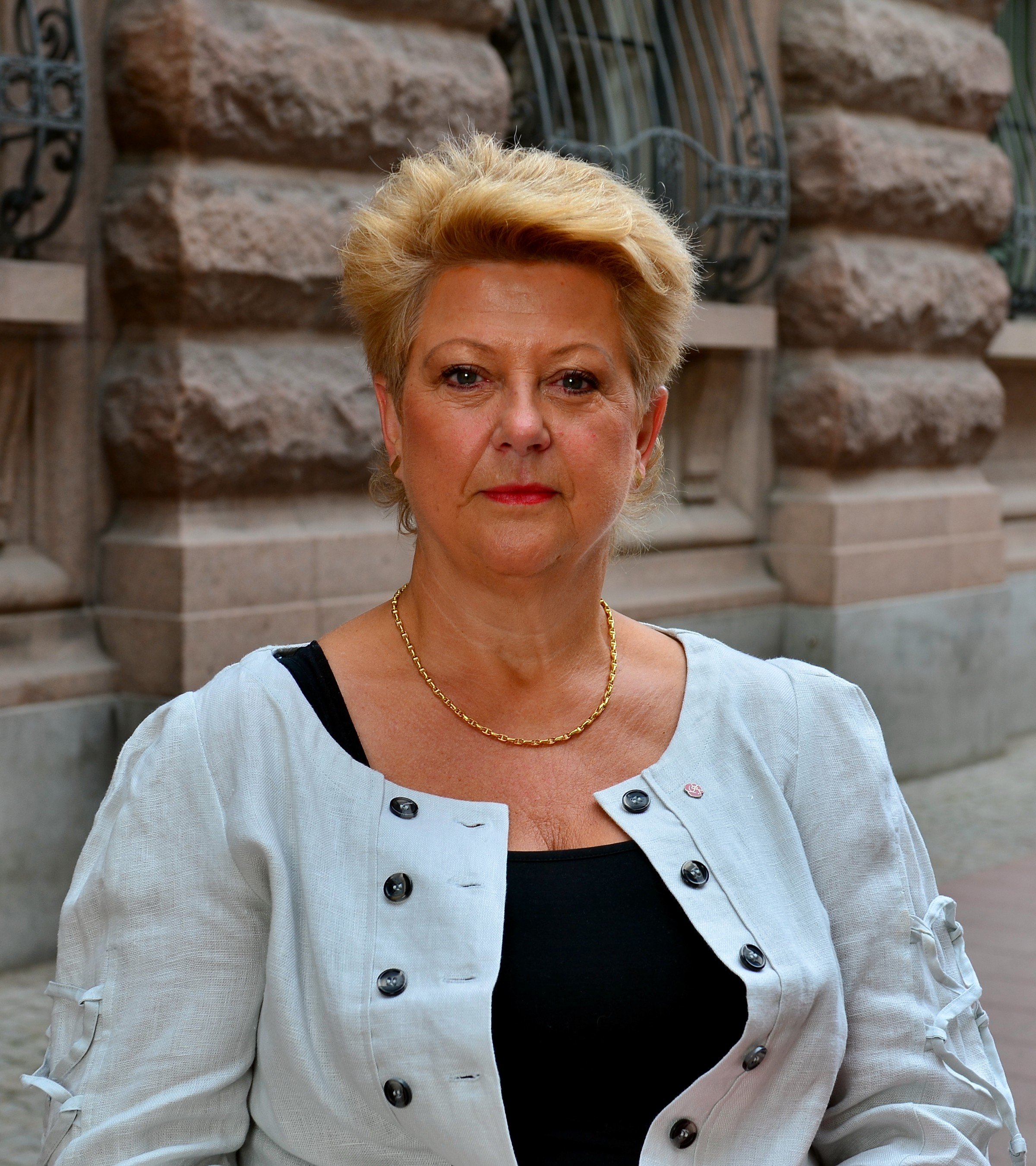

member of the Riksdag
- In office 2002–2018

Personal details
- Political party: Social Democratic

Agneta Gille (born 1956 in Österbybruk) is a Swedish Social Democratic politician. She was a member of the Riksdag 2002–2018.
