= Lars Isovaara =

Swedish civil engineer and politician

Member of the Riksdag for Uppsala County
- In office 4 October 2010 – 29 November 2012

Personal details
- Born: 23 January 1959 (age 67) Vittangi, Sweden
- Party: Sweden Democrats
- Spouse: Christina Degerstedt
- Profession: Civil engineer

Lars Anders Isovaara (born 23 January 1959 in Vittangi, Norrbotten County) is a Swedish civil engineer and former politician of the nationalist Sweden Democrats. He lives in Skellefteå, Sweden.

Isovaara was district chairman of the Sweden Democrats district North, covering Norrbotten County and Västerbotten County. He was also a member of the party's executive board and was criminal policy spokesperson until 2012. Isovaara became the first wheelchair user in the Riksdag. and assumed office in 2010. He left the Riksdag on 29 November 2012 after an incident where he was drunk and first accused two people of foreign origin of stealing his bag and then verbally abused a guard, who also has a foreign background. The bag, however, had been left at a restaurant and had been submitted to the Riksdag Security Unit.

He served as a member of the parliamentary Committee on Industry and Trade (Näringsutskottet) until his resignation.
