= Helena Leander =

Swedish politician (born 1982)

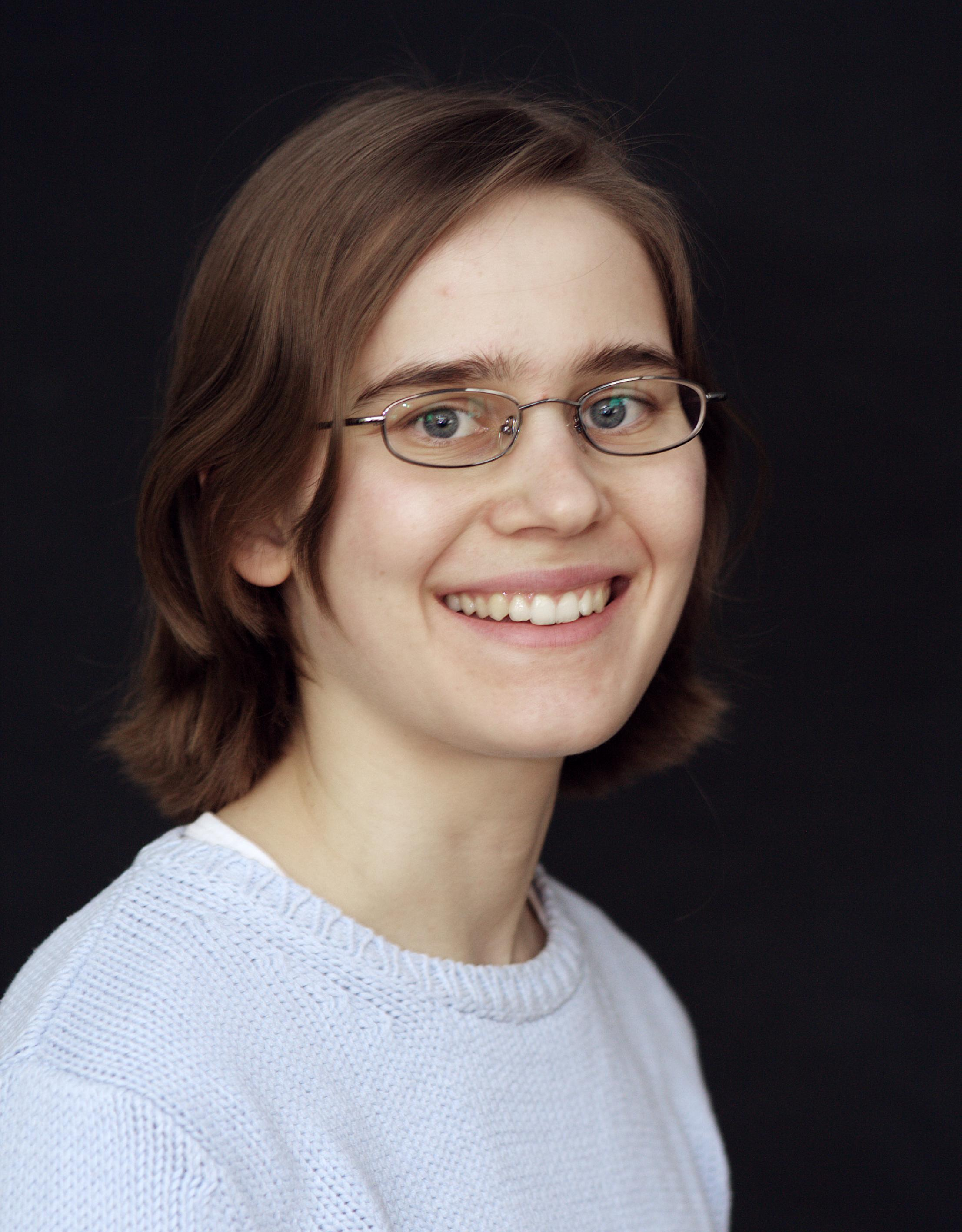
Helena Leander

Helena Leander (born 1982) is a Swedish Green Party politician. She has been a member of the Riksdag since 2006.
