= Gunnar Thollander =

Swedish politician (born 1933)

Gunnar Thollander (born 1933) is a Swedish Social Democratic politician who from 1982 to 1994 was member of the Parliament of Sweden for the Uppsala County constituency. He was Deputy of the Defence Committee from October 8, 1991, to October 2, 1994.
