= Lennart Hedquist =

Swedish politician (born 1943)

Lennart Hedquist (born 1943) is a Swedish politician of the Moderate Party. He has been a member of the Riksdag since 1994 and a replacement member of the Riksdag between 1991 and 1994.
