= Rigmor Stenmark =

Swedish politician (born 1940)

Rigmor Stenmark (born 1940) is a Swedish Centre Party politician, member of the Riksdag 1994–2006. She was elected to the Riksdag from Uppsala County constituency and had a seat of 71. During her time in the Riksdag, Stenmark was a member in residential Committee 1995 - 2006 and during different periods alternate member of the Defense Committee, the Agriculture Committee, the Committee on Justice, Legal Affairs Committee and Social Committee.
