= Ulrika Karlsson (politician) =

Swedish politician (born 1973)

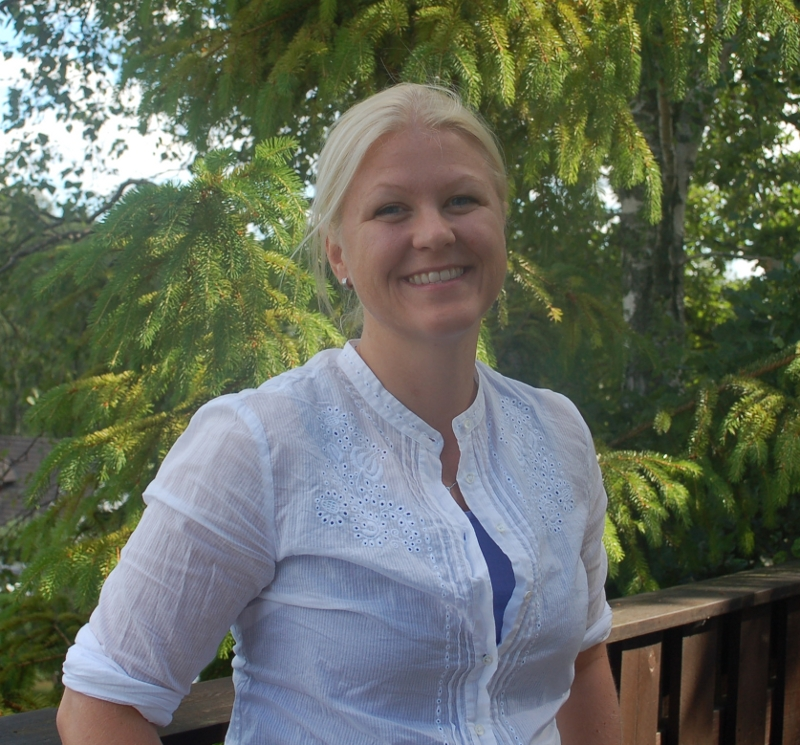
Ulrika Karlsson.

Ulrika Karlsson (born 1973) is a Swedish politician of the Moderate Party. She was member of the Riksdag from 2006 to 2018 and a replacement member of the Riksdag in 2004.
