= Paula Bieler =

Swedish politician (born 1988)

Paula Bieler Eriksson
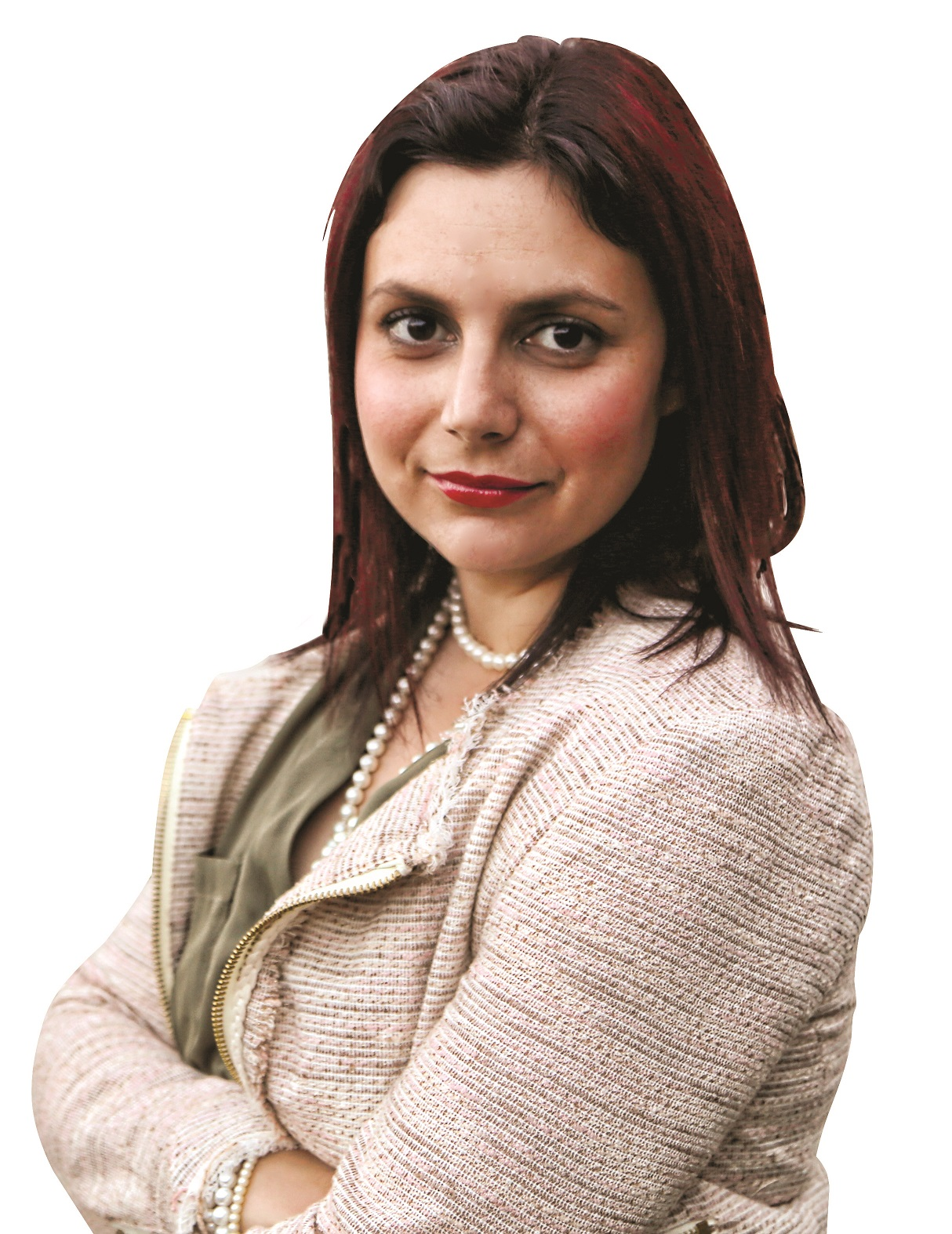

Member of the Riksdag
- In office 2014–2018
- Constituency: Kalmar County

Personal details
- Born: Paula Bieler; 31 March 1988 (age 38) Västerås, Västmanland County, Sweden
- Party: Sweden Democrats (2009–2020)
- Education: Stockholm University; Uppsala University

Paula Bieler Eriksson (née Bieler; born 31 March 1988) is a Swedish former politician for the Sweden Democrats (SD) party. She became a member of the party in 2009. In November 2013 Bieler became an elected member of Sweden Democrats party council. In the 2014 Swedish general election, Bieler was the party's number six national candidate for the Riksdag, and was elected a member of the Riksdag. Since April 2014 Bieler has also been the party's official political spokesman on gender and gay rights. On 11 February 2020, Bieler revealed that she was leaving the Riksdag in an interview with the Swedish tabloid Expressen. Shortly afterwards the podcast Lögnarnas tempel revealed that she has also left the Sweden Democrats.

Bieler's reasons for leaving the SD was partly a dislike of the SD joining a conservative bloc together with the Moderates and the Christian Democrats (and eventually the Liberals), erasing the differences between parties. She also disliked that the SD had campaigned against the Social Democrats after calling themselves heirs (arvtagare) to the Social Democrats. She also disliked some policy positions the party had changed, and the processes and arguments used by the SD leadership to change them. One example is abortion law, where Bieler supported lowering the gestational limit from 18 weeks to 12 weeks.

It was widely reported that a fellow SD member used an antisemitic slur against Bieler, who then was an active politician, during a party meeting.

== Early life ==
Paula Bieler was born on 31 March 1988 in Västerås, Västmanland, but grew up in Täby. Both of Bieler's parents are from Poland. Bieler's father was Jewish, the son of a high ranking Communist politician who had to escape Poland due to an antisemitic campaign by the government. Bieler married Tim Eriksson on 29 February 2020.

=== Political career ===
On 11 February 2020, Paula Bieler announced that she was leaving the Riksdag and all her political posts with immediate effect. She said that the decision had developed over a long period and cited disagreements with the party leadership over policy changes and decision-making. In particular, she mentioned the party's decision to accept Sweden's existing abortion legislation.
