= Gävleborg County (Riksdag constituency) =

Constituency of the Riksdag, the national legislature of Sweden

- Gävleborgs Län
- Constituency for the Riksdag
- Location of Gävleborg County within Sweden
- County: Gävleborg
- Population: 283,449 (2025)
- Electorate: 222,363 (2026)
- Area: 19,728 km^{2} (2026)

Current constituency
- Created: 1970
- Seats: List (Note: Constituency seats only.): 9 (2014–present); 10 (1998–2014); 11 (1979–1998); 12 (1970–1979)
- Member of the Riksdag: List: Lili André (KD); Sanna Backeskog (S); Lars Beckman (M); Mattias Eriksson Falk (SD); Samuel Gonzalez Westling (V); Roger Hedlund (SD); Kristoffer Lindberg (S); Patrik Lundqvist (S); Caroline Schmidt (C); Viktor Wärnick (M)
- Created from: Gävleborg County

Gävleborg County (Swedish: Gävleborgs Län) is one of the 29 multi-member constituencies of the Riksdag, the national legislature of Sweden. The constituency was established in 1970 when the Riksdag changed from a bicameral legislature to a unicameral legislature. It is conterminous with the county of Gävleborg. The constituency currently elects nine of the 349 members of the Riksdag using the open party-list proportional representation electoral system. At the 2026 general election it had 222,363 registered electors.

== Electoral system ==
Gävleborg County currently elects nine of the 349 members of the Riksdag using the open party-list proportional representation electoral system. Constituency seats are allocated using the modified Sainte-Laguë method. Only parties that reach the 4% national threshold and parties that receive at least 12% of the vote in the constituency compete for constituency seats. Supplementary levelling seats may also be allocated at the constituency level to parties that reach the 4% national threshold.

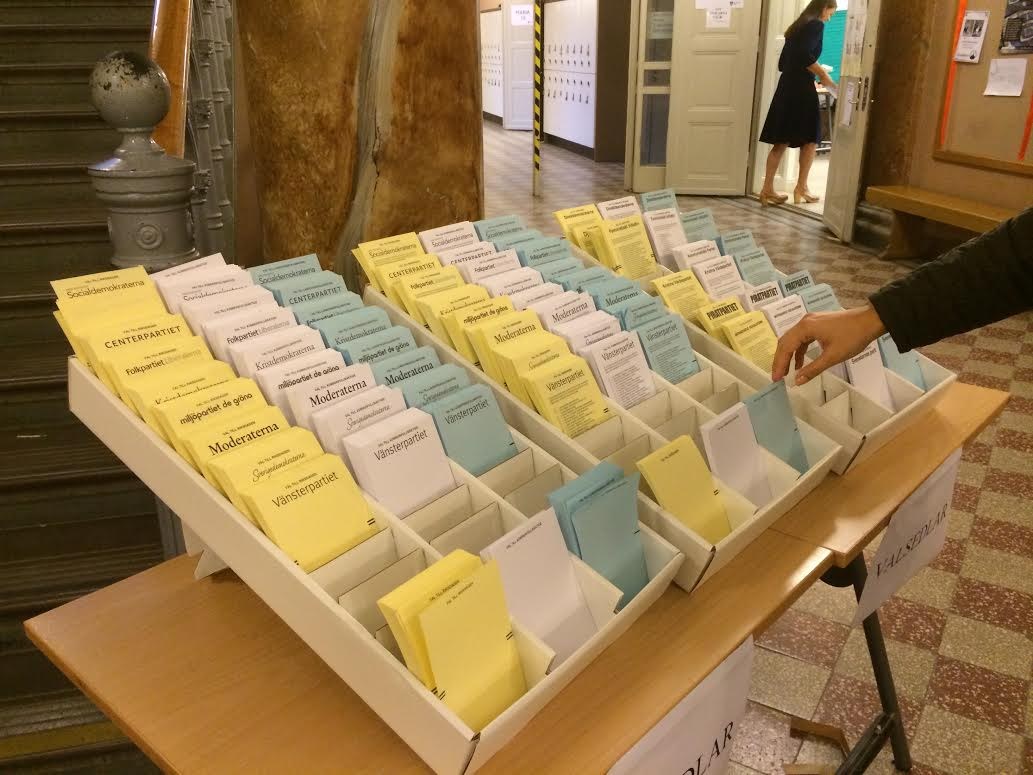
A selection of ballot papers available for voters at the 2014 general election in Stockholm - yellow for the Riksdag, blue for the regional council and white for the municipal council

Prior to 1997 voters could cast any ballot paper they wanted, though it had to contain the name of a party and the name of at least one candidate nominated by that party in the constituency. It was common for parties to hand out ballot papers with their name and list of candidates at the entrance of polling stations. Voters could delete the names of candidates or write-in the names of other candidates but in practice these options weren't used enough by voters to have any significant impact on the results and consequently elections operated as a closed system.

Since 1997, elections in Sweden follow the French model in having separate ballot papers for each party/list in a constituency. There are two ballot papers for each party - a party ballot paper (partivalsedel) with just the name of the party and a name ballot paper (namnvalsedel) with the name of the party and its list of candidates. There are also blank ballot papers (blank valsedel). Voters can initially pick as many ballot papers as they wish and then, in the secrecy of the voting booth, they select a single ballot paper of their choice. If they chose a name ballot paper they have the option of casting a preferential vote for one of their chosen party's candidates. If they chose a blank ballot paper they can write the name of any party including unregistered parties and, optionally, they can write the name of any person as their preferred candidate, even one that does not belong to their chosen party. They then place their chosen ballot paper in an envelope which is placed in the ballot box, discarding all other ballot papers they picked.

Seats won by each party/list in a constituency are allocated to its candidates in order of preference votes (a personal mandate), provided that the candidate has received at least 8% of votes cast for their party in the constituency (5% since January 2011). Any unfilled seats are then allocated to the party's remaining candidates in the order they appear on the party list (a party mandate).

== Election results ==
=== Summary ===
Election	Left V / VPK			Social Democrats S			Greens MP			Centre C			Liberals L / FP / F			Moderates M			Christian Democrats KD / KDS			Sweden Democrats SD		
Election	Votes	%	Seats	Votes	%	Seats	Votes	%	Seats	Votes	%	Seats	Votes	%	Seats	Votes	%	Seats	Votes	%	Seats	Votes	%	Seats
2026	12,469	6.76%	1	58,720	31.82%	3	7,780	4.22%	0	11,180	6.06%	0	7,434	4.03%	0	32,717	17.73%	2	11,411	6.18%	1	39,727	21.53%	2
2022	10,783	5.91%	0	63,415	34.73%	4	6,308	3.45%	0	11,405	6.25%	1	5,462	2.99%	0	29,661	16.24%	2	9,303	5.10%	0	43,994	24.09%	2
2018	15,483	8.35%	1	63,232	34.10%	3	5,661	3.05%	0	16,825	9.07%	1	7,441	4.01%	0	28,334	15.28%	2	9,782	5.28%	0	36,330	19.59%	2
2014	12,054	6.57%	0	70,150	38.23%	4	9,238	5.03%	0	12,244	6.67%	1	6,840	3.73%	0	31,911	17.39%	2	5,931	3.23%	0	29,329	15.98%	2
2010	12,814	7.23%	1	67,893	38.30%	4	10,918	6.16%	0	12,982	7.32%	1	9,444	5.33%	0	41,009	23.14%	3	7,235	4.08%	0	12,616	7.12%	1
2006	13,314	7.94%	1	69,959	41.71%	5	7,275	4.34%	0	18,675	11.13%	1	8,947	5.33%	1	30,923	18.44%	2	8,600	5.13%	0	5,017	2.99%	0
2002	18,412	11.16%	1	74,155	44.96%	5	7,451	4.52%	0	17,187	10.42%	1	16,548	10.03%	1	15,480	9.39%	1	12,230	7.42%	1	1,704	1.03%	0
1998	28,220	16.59%	2	72,374	42.54%	5	8,635	5.08%	0	11,877	6.98%	1	6,009	3.53%	0	23,700	13.93%	1	16,515	9.71%	1			
1994	14,681	7.85%	1	100,293	53.64%	6	10,296	5.51%	0	17,019	9.10%	1	10,906	5.83%	1	24,688	13.21%	2	5,921	3.17%	0			
1991	10,940	5.82%	0	88,175	46.90%	6	6,343	3.37%	0	20,145	10.71%	1	14,763	7.85%	1	23,992	12.76%	1	11,458	6.09%	1			
1988	13,524	7.22%	1	97,147	51.88%	6	9,520	5.08%	0	24,730	13.21%	2	18,256	9.75%	1	17,939	9.58%	1	5,059	2.70%	0			
1985	13,372	6.74%	1	106,413	53.60%	6	3,214	1.62%	0	27,496	13.85%	2	22,142	11.15%	1	25,253	12.72%	1	with C					
1982	13,627	6.75%	1	109,831	54.37%	6	3,564	1.76%	0	4,193	16.93%	2	8,982	4.45%	0	328,033	13.88%	2	3,346	1.66%	0			
1979	13,344	6.72%	1	103,713	52.25%	6				40,546	20.43%	2	15,683	7.90%	1	21,311	10.74%	1	2,712	1.37%	0			
1976	12,495	6.28%	1	101,254	50.89%	6				51,470	25.87%	3	15,740	7.91%	1	14,773	7.43%	1	2,413	1.21%	0			
1973	15,461	8.17%	1	94,781	50.09%	6				49,216	26.01%	3	12,707	6.72%	1	13,250	7.00%	1	2,945	1.56%	0			
1970	14,774	8.04%	1	95,603	52.03%	6				39,843	21.69%	3	19,680	10.71%	1	10,444	5.68%	1	2,568	1.40%	0			

(Excludes levelling seats. Figures in italics represent alliances/joint lists.)

=== Detailed ===
Party has received at least 4% of the vote nationally and is entitled to compete for constituency seats.

==== 2020s ====
===== 2026 =====
Results of the 2026 general election held on 13 September 2026:

Party		Votes per municipality										Total votes	%	Seats		
Party		Boll- näs	Gävle	Hofors	Hudiks- vall	Ljus- dal	Nordan- stig	Ockel- bo	Ovanå- ker	Sand- viken	Söder- hamn	Total votes	%	Con.	Lev.	Tot.
Swedish Social Democratic Party	S	5,397	21,394	1,845	8,023	3,393	1,757	1,205	2,143	8,122	5,441	58,720	31.82%	3	0	3
Sweden Democrats	SD	3,669	13,292	1,542	4,708	2,948	1,513	959	1,709	5,807	3,580	39,727	21.53%	2	0	2
Moderate Party	M	2,664	13,496	907	4,205	2,082	920	571	1,139	4,259	2,474	32,717	17.73%	2	0	2
Left Party	V	1,033	5,407	489	1,537	560	305	165	308	1,692	973	12,469	6.76%	1	0	1
Christian Democrats	KD	1,186	3,847	417	1,343	760	382	322	888	1,325	941	11,411	6.18%	1	0	1
Centre Party	C	1,225	3,312	244	2,130	935	428	276	629	1,070	931	11,180	6.06%	0	1	1
Green Party	MP	687	3,168	138	1,297	547	226	171	199	813	534	7,780	4.22%	0	0	0
Liberals	L	636	3,029	176	911	562	201	149	269	943	558	7,434	4.03%	0	0	0
Örebro Party	ÖP	131	405	39	224	106	55	20	19	195	135	1,329	0.72%	0	0	0
Alternative for Sweden	AfS	62	259	31	109	57	31	38	26	100	46	759	0.41%	0	0	0
Christian Values Party	KrVP	8	78	9	31	2	21	11	17	35	10	222	0.12%	0	0	0
Ambition Sweden	AS	23	68	8	37	18	16	4	18	18	11	221	0.12%	0	0	0
Pirate Party	PP	9	75	9	16	3	4	5	4	20	16	161	0.09%	0	0	0
Independent Rural Party	LPo	2	1	0	31	17	5	5	1	2	33	97	0.05%	0	0	0
Citizens' Coalition	MED	0	36	8	9	12	5	2	1	11	2	86	0.05%	0	0	0
Human Rights and Democracy	MoD	7	23	0	9	5	1	1	0	7	5	58	0.03%	0	0	0
Communist Party of Sweden	SKP	0	12	0	6	8	2	0	0	6	2	36	0.02%	0	0	0
United Voice	ER	8	6	0	6	2	1	0	0	8	1	32	0.02%	0	0	0
Direct Democrats	DD	1	12	0	1	3	1	0	0	5	4	27	0.01%	0	0	0
Nordic Resistance Movement	NMR	0	3	1	2	0	0	1	0	2	2	11	0.01%	0	0	0
Unity	ENH	0	3	0	2	0	1	0	0	1	1	8	0.00%	0	0	0
The Push Buttons	Kn	0	3	0	1	0	1	0	1	1	0	7	0.00%	0	0	0
Classical Liberal Party	KLP	2	2	0	0	0	1	0	0	1	0	6	0.00%	0	0	0
Communist Party	K	1	1	0	0	2	1	0	1	0	0	6	0.00%	0	0	0
RegleraAI.nu		0	2	1	1	0	1	0	0	0	1	6	0.00%	0	0	0
John Party with Extra Moose		0	2	0	1	0	2	0	0	0	0	5	0.00%	0	0	0
Donald Duck Party		1	1	0	0	0	1	0	0	0	0	3	0.00%	0	0	0
Volt Sweden	Volt	0	2	1	0	0	0	0	0	0	0	3	0.00%	0	0	0
Jesus		0	0	0	0	0	1	0	0	0	1	2	0.00%	0	0	0
Nuance Party	PNy	0	2	0	0	0	0	0	0	0	0	2	0.00%	0	0	0
A Good Sweden		0	0	0	0	0	1	0	0	0	0	1	0.00%	0	0	0
Common Sense in Sweden	CSIS	0	0	0	0	0	0	0	0	0	1	1	0.00%	0	0	0
Elbira Party		1	0	0	0	0	0	0	0	0	0	1	0.00%	0	0	0
Electoral Cooperation Party		0	0	0	0	0	0	0	0	1	0	1	0.00%	0	0	0
Faith in the Future	FT	0	0	0	1	0	0	0	0	0	0	1	0.00%	0	0	0
Naturist Party		0	0	0	1	0	0	0	0	0	0	1	0.00%	0	0	0
Pensioners' Party		0	0	0	0	0	0	0	0	1	0	1	0.00%	0	0	0
Secular Humanist Party		0	0	0	1	0	0	0	0	0	0	1	0.00%	0	0	0
Sensible Party		0	0	0	1	0	0	0	0	0	0	1	0.00%	0	0	0
Squirrel Party		0	1	0	0	0	0	0	0	0	0	1	0.00%	0	0	0
Turning Point Party	PV	0	0	0	0	0	0	0	0	0	1	1	0.00%	0	0	0
United Sweden		0	0	0	0	0	0	0	0	1	0	1	0.00%	0	0	0
Valid votes		16,753	67,942	5,865	24,644	12,022	5,884	3,905	7,372	24,446	15,704	184,537	100.00%	9	1	10
Blank votes		182	604	67	289	175	65	49	93	256	184	1,964	1.05%			
Rejected votes – unregistered parties		2	9	1	5	3	3	0	0	2	1	26	0.01%			
Rejected votes – other		4	88	2	27	16	2	2	8	13	13	175	0.09%			
Total polled		16,941	68,643	5,935	24,965	12,216	5,954	3,956	7,473	24,717	15,902	186,702	83.96%			
Registered electors		20,575	80,625	7,242	29,851	14,732	7,232	4,611	8,918	29,348	19,229	222,363				
Turnout		82.34%	85.14%	81.95%	83.63%	82.92%	82.33%	85.79%	83.80%	84.22%	82.70%	83.96%				

The following candidates were elected:

- Constituency seats (personal mandates) - Samuel Gonzalez Westling (V), 722 votes.
- Constituency seats (party mandates) - Lili André (KD), 201 votes; Sanna Backeskog (S), 1,045 votes; Lars Beckman (M), 882 votes; Mattias Eriksson Falk (SD), 128 votes; Roger Hedlund (SD), 169 votes; Kristoffer Lindberg (S), 1,151 votes; Patrik Lundqvist (S), 1,317 votes; Viktor Wärnick (M), 1,119 votes;
- Levelling seats (personal mandates) - Caroline Schmidt (C), 667 votes.

===== 2022 =====
Results of the 2022 general election held on 11 September 2022:

Party		Votes per municipality										Total votes	%	Seats		
Party		Boll- näs	Gävle	Hofors	Hudiks- vall	Ljus- dal	Nordan- stig	Ockel- bo	Ovanå- ker	Sand- viken	Söder- hamn	Total votes	%	Con.	Lev.	Tot.
Swedish Social Democratic Party	S	6,100	21,861	2,188	8,887	3,861	1,902	1,260	2,363	9,034	5,959	63,415	34.73%	4	0	4
Sweden Democrats	SD	4,170	14,794	1,671	5,172	3,156	1,746	1,170	1,820	6,333	3,962	43,994	24.09%	2	0	2
Moderate Party	M	2,358	12,560	814	3,560	1,925	787	466	1,043	3,798	2,350	29,661	16.24%	2	0	2
Centre Party	C	1,264	3,287	236	2,042	958	427	276	747	1,167	1,001	11,405	6.25%	1	0	1
Left Party	V	870	4,251	499	1,542	553	373	199	271	1,413	812	10,783	5.91%	0	1	1
Christian Democrats	KD	1,047	2,806	265	1,294	672	390	190	864	1,000	775	9,303	5.10%	0	1	1
Green Party	MP	512	2,627	129	1,044	423	175	130	185	627	456	6,308	3.45%	0	0	0
Liberals	L	443	2,464	139	601	363	133	71	154	722	372	5,462	2.99%	0	0	0
Alternative for Sweden	AfS	56	174	19	59	39	25	14	13	59	40	498	0.27%	0	0	0
Nuance Party	PNy	6	270	12	16	3	0	3	1	50	16	377	0.21%	0	0	0
Citizens' Coalition	MED	30	108	5	38	14	16	2	13	36	18	280	0.15%	0	0	0
Pirate Party	PP	2	72	9	29	9	2	2	4	35	20	184	0.10%	0	0	0
Human Rights and Democracy	MoD	18	56	3	37	18	3	3	2	14	24	178	0.10%	0	0	0
The Push Buttons	Kn	19	50	3	33	11	14	1	6	21	19	177	0.10%	0	0	0
Independent Rural Party	LPo	12	11	3	25	18	6	0	4	16	36	131	0.07%	0	0	0
Christian Values Party	KrVP	6	36	1	14	2	11	10	17	16	8	121	0.07%	0	0	0
Feminist Initiative	FI	7	24	2	8	4	1	1	0	5	3	55	0.03%	0	0	0
Direct Democrats	DD	1	22	2	11	4	0	0	0	6	1	47	0.03%	0	0	0
Turning Point Party	PV	5	20	0	1	0	0	0	0	1	14	41	0.02%	0	0	0
Unity	ENH	4	12	1	12	3	0	1	1	3	2	39	0.02%	0	0	0
Socialist Welfare Party	S-V	0	23	0	0	0	1	0	0	2	0	26	0.01%	0	0	0
Climate Alliance	KA	5	8	1	5	0	0	0	0	3	0	22	0.01%	0	0	0
Communist Party of Sweden	SKP	0	7	0	1	4	1	0	0	5	3	21	0.01%	0	0	0
Nordic Resistance Movement	NMR	1	2	3	5	0	0	0	0	5	4	20	0.01%	0	0	0
Basic Income Party	BASIP	1	3	0	3	2	2	0	0	0	1	12	0.01%	0	0	0
Classical Liberal Party	KLP	2	5	0	0	0	1	0	0	2	1	11	0.01%	0	0	0
Common Sense in Sweden	CSIS	0	0	1	0	0	0	1	2	1	1	6	0.00%	0	0	0
Donald Duck Party		0	3	0	0	1	0	0	0	0	0	4	0.00%	0	0	0
Hard Line Sweden		0	1	0	0	0	0	0	0	0	1	2	0.00%	0	0	0
Freedom Party		0	0	0	1	0	0	0	0	0	0	1	0.00%	0	0	0
Naturist Party		0	0	0	1	0	0	0	0	0	0	1	0.00%	0	0	0
Volt Sweden	Volt	0	0	0	0	0	1	0	0	0	0	1	0.00%	0	0	0
Yggdrasil		0	1	0	0	0	0	0	0	0	0	1	0.00%	0	0	0
Valid votes		16,939	65,558	6,006	24,441	12,043	6,017	3,800	7,510	24,374	15,899	182,587	100.00%	9	2	11
Blank votes		197	601	58	308	188	77	52	89	245	145	1,960	1.06%			
Rejected votes – unregistered parties		15	9	1	10	1	3	0	0	8	2	49	0.03%			
Rejected votes – other		15	68	4	33	12	5	0	5	22	10	174	0.09%			
Total polled		17,166	66,236	6,069	24,792	12,244	6,102	3,852	7,604	24,649	16,056	184,770	83.46%			
Registered electors		20,585	78,868	7,375	29,561	14,791	7,393	4,549	9,015	29,612	19,646	221,395				
Turnout		83.39%	83.98%	82.29%	83.87%	82.78%	82.54%	84.68%	84.35%	83.24%	81.73%	83.46%				

The following candidates were elected:

- Constituency seats (personal mandates) - Anders W. Jonsson (C), 854 votes.
- Constituency seats (party mandates) - Sanna Backeskog (S), 916 votes; Lars Beckman (M), 1,387 votes; Roger Hedlund (SD), 187 votes; Kristoffer Lindberg (S), 1,349 votes; Patrik Lundqvist (S), 1,065 votes; Daniel Persson (SD), 16 votes; Viktor Wärnick (M), 630 votes; and Linnéa Wickman (S), 479 votes.
- Levelling seats (party mandates) - Lili André (KD), 234 votes; and Samuel Gonzalez Westling (V), 446 votes.

==== 2010s ====
===== 2018 =====
Results of the 2018 general election held on 9 September 2018:

Party		Votes per municipality										Total votes	%	Seats		
Party		Boll- näs	Gävle	Hofors	Hudiks- vall	Ljus- dal	Nordan- stig	Ockel- bo	Ovanå- ker	Sand- viken	Söder- hamn	Total votes	%	Con.	Lev.	Tot.
Swedish Social Democratic Party	S	5,942	21,258	2,408	8,569	4,101	1,978	1,212	2,472	9,164	6,128	63,232	34.10%	3	0	3
Sweden Democrats	SD	3,361	12,893	1,336	4,024	2,409	1,307	1,042	1,362	5,311	3,285	36,330	19.59%	2	0	2
Moderate Party	M	2,400	12,033	691	3,406	1,739	713	431	955	3,559	2,407	28,334	15.28%	2	0	2
Centre Party	C	1,948	4,189	320	3,116	1,480	717	435	1,297	1,661	1,662	16,825	9.07%	1	0	1
Left Party	V	1,313	5,609	721	2,302	833	586	286	367	2,080	1,386	15,483	8.35%	1	0	1
Christian Democrats	KD	1,016	3,257	243	1,319	616	418	189	770	1,110	844	9,782	5.28%	0	0	0
Liberals	L	585	3,551	215	686	405	152	75	206	1,066	500	7,441	4.01%	0	0	0
Green Party	MP	430	2,573	117	888	332	117	108	135	559	402	5,661	3.05%	0	0	0
Feminist Initiative	FI	38	273	16	96	49	12	6	15	55	32	592	0.32%	0	0	0
Alternative for Sweden	AfS	36	203	10	73	21	21	9	12	73	38	496	0.27%	0	0	0
Independent Rural Party	LPo	28	27	11	51	41	31	8	15	46	16	274	0.15%	0	0	0
Citizens' Coalition	MED	16	88	1	27	13	14	3	7	18	12	199	0.11%	0	0	0
Unity	ENH	17	57	4	32	9	8	5	3	43	19	197	0.11%	0	0	0
Direct Democrats	DD	17	70	8	19	8	1	1	3	13	15	155	0.08%	0	0	0
Pirate Party	PP	10	73	6	19	3	2	4	9	17	11	154	0.08%	0	0	0
Animal Party	DjuP	3	19	1	33	1	0	0	2	8	5	72	0.04%	0	0	0
Nordic Resistance Movement	NMR	4	13	4	23		2	1	1	2	3	53	0.03%	0	0	0
Classical Liberal Party	KLP	2	21	0	5	1	0	1	3	3	2	38	0.02%	0	0	0
Christian Values Party	KrVP	2	12	2	1	0	1	0	6	0	0	24	0.01%	0	0	0
Common Sense in Sweden	CSIS	1	2	1	3	0	2	0	1	0	5	15	0.01%	0	0	0
Scania Party	SKÅ	1	8	0	0	3	0	0	0	1	0	13	0.01%	0	0	0
Basic Income Party	BASIP	2	6	1	1	0	1	0	1	0	0	12	0.01%	0	0	0
Initiative	INI	0	0	0	0	0	0	2	0	0	0	2	0.00%	0	0	0
Security Party	TRP	0	2	0	0	0	0	0	0	0	0	2	0.00%	0	0	0
Welfare State Sweden	FHS	0	0	0	2	0	0	0	0	0	0	2	0.00%	0	0	0
European Workers Party	EAP	0	1	0	0	0	0	0	0	0	0	1	0.00%	0	0	0
Parties not on the ballot		1	3	2	4	1	1	0	3	5	4	24	0.01%	0	0	0
Valid votes		17,173	66,241	6,118	24,699	12,065	6,084	3,818	7,645	24,794	16,776	185,413	100.00%	9	0	9
Blank votes		153	586	75	243	153	63	52	85	238	161	1,809	0.97%			
Rejected votes – unregistered parties		6	28	4	6	3	1	0	0	18	7	73	0.04%			
Rejected votes – other		19	48	8	21	12	6	6	1	15	14	150	0.08%			
Total polled		17,351	66,903	6,205	24,969	12,233	6,154	3,876	7,731	25,065	16,958	187,445	86.29%			
Registered electors		20,306	76,433	7,333	29,182	14,622	7,363	4,499	8,968	28,827	19,702	217,235				
Turnout		85.45%	87.53%	84.62%	85.56%	83.66%	83.58%	86.15%	86.21%	86.95%	86.07%	86.29%				

The following candidates were elected:

- Constituency seats (personal mandates) - Ulla Andersson (V), 1,103 votes; Lars Beckman (M), 1,502 votes; and Anders W. Jonsson (C), 951 votes.
- Constituency seats (party mandates) - Roger Hedlund (SD), 279 votes; Åsa Lindestam (S), 1,156 votes; Elin Lundgren (S), 1,213 votes; Patrik Lundqvist (S), 924 votes; Thomas Morell (SD), 13 votes; and Viktor Wärnick (M), 489 votes.

===== 2014 =====
Results of the 2014 general election held on 14 September 2014:

Party		Votes per municipality										Total votes	%	Seats		
Party		Boll- näs	Gävle	Hofors	Hudiks- vall	Ljus- dal	Nordan- stig	Ockel- bo	Ovanå- ker	Sand- viken	Söder- hamn	Total votes	%	Con.	Lev.	Tot.
Swedish Social Democratic Party	S	6,672	21,915	2,893	9,352	4,420	2,398	1,489	2,802	10,816	7,393	70,150	38.23%	4	0	4
Moderate Party	M	2,612	13,500	681	3,940	2,278	907	502	1,108	3,830	2,553	31,911	17.39%	2	0	2
Sweden Democrats	SD	3,191	10,170	975	3,349	2,009	1,127	804	1,228	3,789	2,687	29,329	15.98%	2	0	2
Centre Party	C	1,444	2,753	274	2,233	1,041	583	440	1,028	1,273	1,175	12,244	6.67%	1	0	1
Left Party	V	1,012	4,310	660	1,698	676	357	229	291	1,763	1,058	12,054	6.57%	0	1	1
Green Party	MP	720	3,991	182	1,461	592	228	142	270	961	691	9,238	5.03%	0	1	1
Liberal People's Party	FP	526	3,248	171	687	383	212	83	167	921	442	6,840	3.73%	0	0	0
Christian Democrats	KD	546	2,087	106	809	291	227	86	632	677	470	5,931	3.23%	0	0	0
Feminist Initiative	FI	338	1,685	95	597	319	109	79	86	456	289	4,053	2.21%	0	0	0
Pirate Party	PP	64	371	28	94	38	10	6	33	120	63	827	0.45%	0	0	0
Unity	ENH	12	76	5	73	9	10	1	8	32	33	259	0.14%	0	0	0
Independent Rural Party	LPo	15	30	9	14	45	18	15	15	77	4	242	0.13%	0	0	0
Animal Party	DjuP	5	60	1	4	6	0	0	0	3	26	105	0.06%	0	0	0
Christian Values Party	KrVP	0	43	2	8	0	6	2	9	1	4	75	0.04%	0	0	0
Swedish Senior Citizen Interest Party	SPI	0	1	0	2	0	0	1	0	0	67	71	0.04%	0	0	0
Party of the Swedes	SVP	9	19	4	10	1	2	1	0	4	5	55	0.03%	0	0	0
Classical Liberal Party	KLP	2	5	0	4	3	1	1	1	6	1	24	0.01%	0	0	0
Communist Party of Sweden	SKP	0	10	1	0	3	1	0	1	3	0	19	0.01%	0	0	0
Direct Democrats	DD	0	11	1	2	0	0	0	1	1	0	16	0.01%	0	0	0
European Workers Party	EAP	0	0	0	0	1	0	0	0	2	1	4	0.00%	0	0	0
Progressive Party		0	0	3	0	0	0	0	0	0	0	3	0.00%	0	0	0
Socialist Justice Party	RS	0	0	0	1	0	0	0	0	0	1	2	0.00%	0	0	0
Crossroads		0	0	1	0	0	0	0	0	0	0	1	0.00%	0	0	0
Freedom of the Justice Party		0	0	0	0	1	0	0	0	0	0	1	0.00%	0	0	0
Health Party		0	0	0	0	0	1	0	0	0	0	1	0.00%	0	0	0
Parties not on the ballot		2	14	8	12	3	7	0	4	6	4	60	0.03%	0	0	0
Valid votes		17,170	64,299	6,100	24,350	12,119	6,204	3,881	7,684	24,741	16,967	183,515	100.00%	9	2	11
Blank votes		154	552	66	234	133	76	35	78	214	153	1,695	0.91%			
Rejected votes		7	24	3	8	2	1	2	0	10	6	63	0.03%			
Total polled		17,331	64,875	6,169	24,592	12,254	6,281	3,918	7,762	24,965	17,126	185,273	85.40%			
Registered electors		20,669	74,732	7,332	29,090	14,771	7,411	4,598	9,117	28,988	20,241	216,949				
Turnout		83.85%	86.81%	84.14%	84.54%	82.96%	84.75%	85.21%	85.14%	86.12%	84.61%	85.40%				

The following candidates were elected:

- Constituency seats (personal mandates) - Anders W. Jonsson (C), 1,215 votes; and Tomas Tobé (M), 2,589 votes.
- Constituency seats (party mandates) - Mikael Eskilandersson (SD), 0 votes; Mikael Jansson (SD), 6 votes; Margareta Kjellin (M), 484 votes; Åsa Lindestam (S), 1,179 votes; Elin Lundgren (S), 1,256 votes; Patrik Lundqvist (S), 890 votes; and Raimo Pärssinen (S), 2,406 votes.
- Levelling seats (personal mandates) - Ulla Andersson (V), 1,103 votes.
- Levelling seats (party mandates)s - Anders Schröder (MP), 341 votes.

Permanent substitutions:

- Margareta Kjellin (M) died on 14 February 2017 and was replaced by Lars Beckman (M) on 15 February 2017.

===== 2010 =====
Results of the 2010 general election held on 19 September 2010:

Party		Votes per municipality										Total votes	%	Seats		
Party		Boll- näs	Gävle	Hofors	Hudiks- vall	Ljus- dal	Nordan- stig	Ockel- bo	Ovanå- ker	Sand- viken	Söder- hamn	Total votes	%	Con.	Lev.	Tot.
Swedish Social Democratic Party	S	6,063	21,208	3,089	8,677	4,336	2,292	1,589	2,785	10,536	7,318	67,893	38.30%	4	0	4
Moderate Party	M	3,676	16,677	967	5,126	2,822	1,144	766	1,392	5,039	3,400	41,009	23.14%	3	0	3
Centre Party	C	1,574	2,827	250	2,376	1,114	692	484	1,159	1,348	1,158	12,982	7.32%	1	0	1
Left Party	V	1,123	4,186	684	1,905	870	427	236	269	1,931	1,183	12,814	7.23%	1	0	1
Sweden Democrats	SD	1,386	4,566	458	1,337	813	515	302	387	1,438	1,414	12,616	7.12%	1	0	1
Green Party	MP	880	4,600	262	1,680	605	278	211	308	1,223	871	10,918	6.16%	0	1	1
Liberal People's Party	FP	888	4,189	308	953	516	339	133	265	1,194	659	9,444	5.33%	0	1	1
Christian Democrats	KD	700	2,349	123	1,040	424	298	113	739	897	552	7,235	4.08%	0	0	0
Pirate Party	PP	68	383	26	126	58	15	19	23	130	76	924	0.52%	0	0	0
Feminist Initiative	FI	42	194	16	61	31	11	10	5	49	19	438	0.25%	0	0	0
Norrland Coalition Party	NorrS	17	18	0	149	72	44	0	6	6	23	335	0.19%	0	0	0
Rural Democrats		31	32	11	11	42	16	6	32	52	12	245	0.14%	0	0	0
Swedish Senior Citizen Interest Party	SPI	1	4	3	5	5	0	2	0	2	149	171	0.10%	0	0	0
Population Party		0	32	0	0	0	0	1	0	2	0	35	0.02%	0	0	0
Classical Liberal Party	KLP	2	7	0	8	2	0	0	1	9	0	29	0.02%	0	0	0
National Democrats	ND	4	3	17	3	1	0	0	0	1	0	29	0.02%	0	0	0
Unity	ENH	2	7	0	6	3	0	0	0	1	4	23	0.01%	0	0	0
Communist Party of Sweden	SKP	0	10	1	0	1	1	0	0	5	0	18	0.01%	0	0	0
Freedom Party		2	1	0	4	0	1	0	1	4	1	14	0.01%	0	0	0
Party of the Swedes	SVP	2	3	1	0	0	1	0	0	2	3	12	0.01%	0	0	0
Spirits Party		1	6	1	0	1	1	0	0	2	0	12	0.01%	0	0	0
Li Yu Chen Andersson Party		0	2	0	0	0	0	0	0	2	0	4	0.00%	0	0	0
Active Democracy		0	0	0	0	1	0	0	0	1	0	2	0.00%	0	0	0
European Workers Party	EAP	0	1	0	0	0	0	0	0	1	0	2	0.00%	0	0	0
Alliance Party / Citizen's Voice	ALP	0	1	0	0	0	0	0	0	0	0	1	0.00%	0	0	0
Socialist Justice Party	RS	1	0	0	0	0	0	0	0	0	0	1	0.00%	0	0	0
Parties not on the ballot		3	17	3	5	4	3	0	0	4	3	42	0.02%	0	0	0
Valid votes		16,466	61,323	6,220	23,472	11,721	6,078	3,872	7,372	23,879	16,845	177,248	100.00%	10	2	12
Blank votes		223	707	83	353	204	88	57	134	312	198	2,359	1.31%			
Rejected votes		13	40	1	16	4	4	1	6	11	8	104	0.06%			
Total polled		16,702	62,070	6,304	23,841	11,929	6,170	3,930	7,512	24,202	17,051	179,711	82.76%			
Registered electors		20,912	73,244	7,580	29,124	15,086	7,639	4,808	9,286	28,867	20,606	217,152				
Turnout		79.87%	84.74%	83.17%	81.86%	79.07%	80.77%	81.74%	80.90%	83.84%	82.75%	82.76%				

The following candidates were elected:

- Constituency seats (personal mandates) - Tomas Tobé (M), 4,070 votes.
- Constituency seats (party mandates) - Ulla Andersson (V), 979 votes; Lars Beckman (M), 739 votes; Richard Jomshof (SD), 15 votes; Anders W. Jonsson (C), 1,008 votes; Margareta Kjellin (M), 1,154 votes; Åsa Lindestam (S), 1,662 votes; Elin Lundgren (S), 1,063 votes; Raimo Pärssinen (S), 2,711 votes; and Per Svedberg (S), 887 votes.
- Levelling seats (party mandates) - Hans Backman (FP), 446 votes; and Bodil Ceballos (MP), 629 votes.

==== 2000s ====
===== 2006 =====
Results of the 2006 general election held on 17 September 2006:

Party		Votes per municipality										Total votes	%	Seats		
Party		Boll- näs	Gävle	Hofors	Hudiks- vall	Ljus- dal	Nordan- stig	Ockel- bo	Ovanå- ker	Sand- viken	Söder- hamn	Total votes	%	Con.	Lev.	Tot.
Swedish Social Democratic Party	S	6,046	23,058	3,065	8,629	4,340	2,230	1,642	2,728	10,835	7,386	69,959	41.71%	5	0	5
Moderate Party	M	2,671	12,600	821	3,883	2,147	829	549	968	4,000	2,455	30,923	18.44%	2	0	2
Centre Party	C	2,664	3,524	352	3,513	1,623	1,133	621	1,690	1,781	1,774	18,675	11.13%	1	0	1
Left Party	V	1,051	4,230	685	1,875	938	415	339	304	2,021	1,456	13,314	7.94%	1	0	1
Liberal People's Party	FP	752	4,036	325	809	491	289	113	327	1,144	661	8,947	5.33%	1	0	1
Christian Democrats	KD	893	2,773	171	1,098	553	302	148	839	1,023	800	8,600	5.13%	0	0	0
Green Party	MP	589	3,055	190	1,176	434	201	119	198	759	554	7,275	4.34%	0	1	1
Sweden Democrats	SD	476	1,888	239	500	351	213	74	145	547	584	5,017	2.99%	0	0	0
June List		86	402	57	208	92	67	25	27	222	85	1,271	0.76%	0	0	0
Health Care Party	Sjvåp	267	232	36	53	72	22	20	84	163	130	1,079	0.64%	0	0	0
Pirate Party	PP	91	425	31	126	49	29	15	38	162	91	1,057	0.63%	0	0	0
Feminist Initiative	FI	65	362	26	177	53	36	4	5	83	69	880	0.52%	0	0	0
Swedish Senior Citizen Interest Party	SPI	11	61	6	16	15	8	9	11	20	148	305	0.18%	0	0	0
New Future	NYF	13	14	0	28	4	38	1	6	4	5	113	0.07%	0	0	0
Unity	ENH	12	39	1	15	5	2	1	1	14	6	96	0.06%	0	0	0
September List		1	2	0	37	1	6	0	1	0	3	51	0.03%	0	0	0
National Socialist Front		6	22	0	0	1	0	0	2	0	2	33	0.02%	0	0	0
People's Will		1	8	0	1	1	1	4	0	3	6	25	0.01%	0	0	0
Active Democracy		0	16	0	0	0	0	1	0	1	0	18	0.01%	0	0	0
National Democrats	ND	3	4	0	0	2	0	0	1	1	0	11	0.01%	0	0	0
Classical Liberal Party	KLP	0	3	0	2	1	0	0	0	2	0	8	0.00%	0	0	0
The Communists	KOMM	1	2	0	0	1	1	0	0	2	0	7	0.00%	0	0	0
Socialist Justice Party	RS	1	2	0	0	0	0	1	0	0	1	5	0.00%	0	0	0
Unique Party		0	1	0	2	0	0	0	0	0	0	3	0.00%	0	0	0
Nordic Union		0	0	0	0	0	1	0	0	0	0	1	0.00%	0	0	0
Other parties		1	7	0	5	2	1	0	2	35	2	55	0.03%	0	0	0
Valid votes		15,701	56,766	6,005	22,153	11,176	5,824	3,686	7,377	22,822	16,218	167,728	100.00%	10	1	11
Blank votes		331	1,029	125	507	278	148	98	160	364	329	3,369	1.97%			
Rejected votes		6	26	2	20	5	4	1	1	4	6	75	0.04%			
Total polled		16,038	57,821	6,132	22,680	11,459	5,976	3,785	7,538	23,190	16,553	171,172	79.26%			
Registered electors		20,839	71,543	7,799	28,968	15,222	7,743	4,838	9,432	28,700	20,891	215,975				
Turnout		76.96%	80.82%	78.63%	78.29%	75.28%	77.18%	78.23%	79.92%	80.80%	79.24%	79.26%				

The following candidates were elected:

- Constituency seats (personal mandates) - Sven Bergström (C), 2,411 votes; and Ulrica Messing (S), 7,836 votes.
- Constituency seats (party mandates) - Ulla Andersson (V), 729 votes; Hans Backman (FP), 460 votes; Sinikka Bohlin (S), 222 votes; Margareta Kjellin (M), 934 votes; Åsa Lindestam (S), 569 votes; Raimo Pärssinen (S), 982 votes; Per Svedberg (S), 485 votes; and Tomas Tobé (M), 2,470 votes.
- Levelling seats (party mandates) - Bodil Ceballos (MP), 400 votes.

Permanent substitutions:

- Ulrica Messing (S) resigned on 18 September 2007 and was replaced by Roland Bäckman (S) on the same day.

===== 2002 =====
Results of the 2002 general election held on 15 September 2002:

Party		Votes per municipality										Total votes	%	Seats		
Party		Boll- näs	Gävle	Hofors	Hudiks- vall	Ljus- dal	Nordan- stig	Ockel- bo	Ovanå- ker	Sand- viken	Söder- hamn	Total votes	%	Con.	Lev.	Tot.
Swedish Social Democratic Party	S	6,085	25,303	3,380	9,108	4,628	2,252	1,681	2,736	11,622	7,360	74,155	44.96%	5	0	5
Left Party	V	1,495	5,425	922	2,514	1,432	528	481	524	2,640	2,451	18,412	11.16%	1	0	1
Centre Party	C	2,961	2,372	306	3,211	1,612	1,144	554	1,780	1,463	1,784	17,187	10.42%	1	0	1
Liberal People's Party	FP	1,868	7,013	461	1,661	994	453	237	617	1,907	1,337	16,548	10.03%	1	0	1
Moderate Party	M	1,577	6,393	387	1,723	909	402	240	569	2,034	1,246	15,480	9.39%	1	0	1
Christian Democrats	KD	1,232	4,050	257	1,512	815	489	212	1,056	1,466	1,141	12,230	7.42%	1	0	1
Green Party	MP	784	2,694	197	1,202	491	256	100	287	835	605	7,451	4.52%	0	1	1
Sweden Democrats	SD	138	795	72	134	96	40	30	25	251	123	1,704	1.03%	0	0	0
New Future	NYF	154	184	2	207	49	118	32	49	140	195	1,130	0.69%	0	0	0
Swedish Senior Citizen Interest Party	SPI	11	69	4	20	14	20	6	6	46	28	224	0.14%	0	0	0
The Communists	KOMM	2	10	0	0	2	1	0	0	2	6	23	0.01%	0	0	0
Unity	ENH	0	2	0	7	0	0	4	0	2	0	15	0.01%	0	0	0
Populist Party	Pop	0	1	0	7	0	0	0	0	0	0	8	0.00%	0	0	0
Socialist Party	SOC.P	0	6	1	1	0	0	0	0	0	0	8	0.00%	0	0	0
Socialist Justice Party	RS	0	4	0	0	0	0	0	0	1	0	5	0.00%	0	0	0
Other parties		52	75	3	57	27	14	9	21	45	51	354	0.21%	0	0	0
Valid votes		16,359	54,396	5,992	21,364	11,069	5,717	3,586	7,670	22,454	16,327	164,934	100.00%	10	1	11
Rejected votes		282	956	79	388	178	75	57	115	365	345	2,840	1.69%			
Total polled		16,641	55,352	6,071	21,752	11,247	5,792	3,643	7,785	22,819	16,672	167,774	77.65%			
Registered electors		20,889	70,232	7,929	28,845	15,642	7,796	4,788	9,635	28,854	21,442	216,052				
Turnout		79.66%	78.81%	76.57%	75.41%	71.90%	74.29%	76.09%	80.80%	79.08%	77.75%	77.65%				

The following candidates were elected:

- Constituency seats (personal mandates) - Sven Bergström (C), 2,728 votes; Ragnwi Marcelind (KD), 1,372 votes; Ulrica Messing (S), 7,965 votes; and Patrik Norinder (M), 1,267 votes.
- Constituency seats (party mandates) - Hans Backman (FP), 570 votes; Sinikka Bohlin (S), 410 votes; Owe Hellberg (V), 702 votes; Åsa Lindestam (S), 453 votes; Raimo Pärssinen (S), 1,428 votes; and Per-Olof Svensson (S), 786 votes.
- Levelling seats (party mandates) - Lotta Nilsson-Hedström (MP), 589 votes.

==== 1990s ====
===== 1998 =====
Results of the 1998 general election held on 20 September 1998:

Party		Votes per municipality										Total votes	%	Seats		
Party		Boll- näs	Gävle	Hofors	Hudiks- vall	Ljus- dal	Nordan- stig	Ockel- bo	Ovanå- ker	Sand- viken	Söder- hamn	Total votes	%	Con.	Lev.	Tot.
Swedish Social Democratic Party	S	6,392	23,255	3,366	8,559	4,676	2,244	1,577	3,013	11,486	7,806	72,374	42.54%	5	0	5
Left Party	V	2,712	7,942	1,381	3,936	2,241	1,038	818	901	4,032	3,219	28,220	16.59%	2	0	2
Moderate Party	M	2,165	9,620	636	2,652	1,514	557	418	863	3,270	2,005	23,700	13.93%	1	1	2
Christian Democrats	KD	1,895	5,379	404	2,214	1,087	676	330	1,267	1,890	1,373	16,515	9.71%	1	0	1
Centre Party	C	1,559	1,719	248	2,439	1,122	900	439	1,190	1,135	1,126	11,877	6.98%	1	0	1
Green Party	MP	984	2,817	229	1,560	513	367	135	398	888	744	8,635	5.08%	0	1	1
Liberal People's Party	FP	552	2,618	153	590	454	202	61	272	732	375	6,009	3.53%	0	0	0
Other parties		245	785	63	447	176	221	27	87	249	498	2,798	1.64%	0	0	0
Valid votes		16,504	54,135	6,480	22,397	11,783	6,205	3,805	7,991	23,682	17,146	170,128	100.00%	10	2	12
Rejected votes		394	1,216	127	462	211	132	81	127	468	339	3,557	2.05%			
Total polled		16,898	55,351	6,607	22,859	11,994	6,337	3,886	8,118	24,150	17,485	173,685	79.37%			
Registered electors		21,480	68,964	8,326	29,136	15,992	8,245	4,905	9,959	29,730	22,089	218,826				
Turnout		78.67%	80.26%	79.35%	78.46%	75.00%	76.86%	79.23%	81.51%	81.23%	79.16%	79.37%				

The following candidates were elected:

- Constituency seats (personal mandates) - Erik Åsbrink (S), 5,969 votes; Sven Bergström (C), 2,562 votes; and Patrik Norinder (M), 2,536 votes.
- Constituency seats (party mandates) - Sinikka Bohlin (S), 498 votes; Owe Hellberg (V), 1,898 votes; Ragnwi Marcelind (KD), 865 votes; Ulrica Messing (S), 4,544 votes; Yvonne Oscarsson (V), 1,196 votes; Raimo Pärssinen (S), 764 votes; and Per-Olof Svensson (S), 1,021 votes.
- Levelling seats (personal mandates) - Thomas Julin (MP), 691 votes.
- Levelling seats (party mandates) - Anne-Katrine Dunker (M), 926 votes;

Permanent substitutions:

- Erik Åsbrink (S) resigned on 14 September 1999 and was replaced by Agneta Brendt (S) on the same day.

===== 1994 =====
Results of the 1994 general election held on 18 September 1994:

Party		Votes per municipality										Total votes	%	Seats		
Party		Boll- näs	Gävle	Hofors	Hudiks- vall	Ljus- dal	Nordan- stig	Ockel- bo	Ovanå- ker	Sand- viken	Söder- hamn	Total votes	%	Con.	Lev.	Tot.
Swedish Social Democratic Party	S	9,222	31,456	4,646	11,643	6,861	3,226	2,209	4,003	15,623	11,404	100,293	53.64%	6	0	6
Moderate Party	M	2,227	9,623	752	2,870	1,732	646	454	877	3,352	2,155	24,688	13.21%	2	0	2
Centre Party	C	2,242	2,566	395	3,338	1,656	1,278	617	1,663	1,750	1,514	17,019	9.10%	1	0	1
Left Party	V	1,423	3,969	823	2,260	1,116	570	321	422	2,038	1,739	14,681	7.85%	1	0	1
Liberal People's Party	FP	1,000	4,723	271	1,039	751	307	141	469	1,358	847	10,906	5.83%	1	0	1
Green Party	MP	1,134	3,113	273	1,822	704	545	168	471	1,077	989	10,296	5.51%	0	1	1
Christian Democratic Unity	KDS	603	1,651	109	882	336	338	122	776	652	452	5,921	3.17%	0	0	0
New Democracy	NyD	120	816	50	314	119	101	36	46	260	215	2,077	1.11%	0	0	0
Other parties		181	343	35	155	41	41	21	40	80	141	1,078	0.58%	0	0	0
Valid votes		18,152	58,260	7,354	24,323	13,316	7,052	4,089	8,767	26,190	19,456	186,959	100.00%	11	1	12
Rejected votes		254	883	95	306	156	100	66	141	369	252	2,622	1.38%			
Total polled		18,406	59,143	7,449	24,629	13,472	7,152	4,155	8,908	26,559	19,708	189,581	85.28%			
Registered electors		21,732	68,864	8,661	29,467	16,488	8,589	4,951	10,221	30,399	22,932	222,304				
Turnout		84.70%	85.88%	86.01%	83.58%	81.71%	83.27%	83.92%	87.15%	87.37%	85.94%	85.28%				

The following candidates were elected: Axel Andersson (S); Widar Andersson (S); Sinikka Bohlin (S); Sigrid Bolkéus (S); Rolf Dahlberg (M); Karl Hagström (S); Owe Hellberg (V); Thomas Julin (MP); Ulrica Messing (S); Patrik Norinder (M); Lennart Rohdin (FP); and Karin Starrin (C).

Permanent substitutions:

- Karin Starrin (C) resigned on 30 April 1997 upon being appointed Governor of Halland County and was replaced by Sven Bergström (C) on 1 May 1997.

===== 1991 =====
Results of the 1991 general election held on 15 September 1991:

Party		Votes per municipality										Total votes	%	Seats		
Party		Boll- näs	Gävle	Hofors	Hudiks- vall	Ljus- dal	Nordan- stig	Ockel- bo	Ovanå- ker	Sand- viken	Söder- hamn	Total votes	%	Con.	Lev.	Tot.
Swedish Social Democratic Party	S	7,576	27,448	4,597	9,613	5,868	2,826	1,998	3,433	14,353	10,463	88,175	46.90%	6	0	6
Moderate Party	M	2,334	9,399	685	2,791	1,500	648	475	869	3,149	2,142	23,992	12.76%	1	1	2
Centre Party	C	2,655	3,024	445	4,026	2,030	1,587	727	1,866	1,931	1,854	20,145	10.71%	1	0	1
Liberal People's Party	FP	1,386	6,068	418	1,558	1,064	448	191	589	1,828	1,213	14,763	7.85%	1	0	1
Christian Democratic Unity	KDS	1,225	3,263	251	1,773	834	617	249	1,125	1,201	920	11,458	6.09%	1	0	1
New Democracy	NyD	1,073	3,734	259	1,571	800	416	225	443	1,748	971	11,240	5.98%	1	0	1
Left Party	V	1,135	2,896	693	1,580	891	392	224	321	1,554	1,254	10,940	5.82%	0	1	1
Green Party	MP	715	1,991	166	1,119	377	325	114	270	703	563	6,343	3.37%	0	0	0
Other parties		100	419	51	73	33	14	16	27	108	114	955	0.51%	0	0	0
Valid votes		18,199	58,242	7,565	24,104	13,397	7,273	4,219	8,943	26,575	19,494	188,011	100.00%	11	2	13
Rejected votes		298	975	127	381	202	126	63	137	396	260	2,965	1.55%			
Total polled		18,497	59,217	7,692	24,485	13,599	7,399	4,282	9,080	26,971	19,754	190,976	85.30%			
Registered electors		21,769	68,874	8,960	29,322	16,629	8,832	5,047	10,417	30,901	23,145	223,896				
Turnout		84.97%	85.98%	85.85%	83.50%	81.78%	83.77%	84.84%	87.17%	87.28%	85.35%	85.30%				

The following candidates were elected: Axel Andersson (S); Widar Andersson (S); Gunnar Björk (C); Sinikka Bohlin (S); Sigrid Bolkéus (S); Rolf Dahlberg (M); Ulf C. Eriksson (NyD); Karl Hagström (S); Hans Lindblad (FP); Bertil Måbrink (V); Ulrica Messing (S); Patrik Norinder (M); and Pontus Wiklund (KDS).

Permanent substitutions:

- Gunnar Björk (C) resigned on 30 June 1992 upon being appointed Governor of Kopparberg County and was replaced by Karin Starrin (C) on 1 July 1992.
- Hans Lindblad (FP) resigned on 11 January 1993 and was replaced by Lennart Rohdin (FP) on 12 January 1993.

==== 1980s ====
===== 1988 =====
Results of the 1988 general election held on 18 September 1988:

Party		Votes per municipality										Total votes	%	Seats		
Party		Boll- näs	Gävle	Hofors	Hudiks- vall	Ljus- dal	Nordan- stig	Ockel- bo	Ovanå- ker	Sand- viken	Söder- hamn	Total votes	%	Con.	Lev.	Tot.
Swedish Social Democratic Party	S	8,612	29,989	5,033	10,574	6,522	3,181	2,176	3,873	15,628	11,559	97,147	51.88%	6	0	6
Centre Party	C	3,007	4,230	621	4,736	2,349	1,825	894	2,271	2,603	2,194	24,730	13.21%	2	0	2
Liberal People's Party	FP	1,857	7,438	493	1,948	1,246	523	268	836	2,284	1,363	18,256	9.75%	1	0	1
Moderate Party	M	1,632	7,190	521	2,011	1,122	444	295	649	2,586	1,489	17,939	9.58%	1	0	1
Left Party – Communists	VPK	1,231	3,694	848	1,951	1,030	472	257	297	2,000	1,744	13,524	7.22%	1	0	1
Green Party	MP	953	3,145	294	1,559	577	481	201	453	1,019	838	9,520	5.08%	0	1	1
Christian Democratic Unity	KDS	539	1,285	77	837	361	382	97	523	564	394	5,059	2.70%	0	0	0
Other parties		85	398	64	42	103	2	4	8	226	138	1,070	0.57%	0	0	0
Valid votes		17,916	57,369	7,951	23,658	13,310	7,310	4,192	8,910	26,910	19,719	187,245	100.00%	11	1	12
Rejected votes		173	604	37	241	91	71	42	89	230	217	1,795	0.95%			
Total polled		18,089	57,973	7,988	23,899	13,401	7,381	4,234	8,999	27,140	19,936	189,040	84.62%			
Registered electors		21,645	68,322	9,270	28,914	16,620	8,823	5,073	10,359	31,059	23,301	223,386				
Turnout		83.57%	84.85%	86.17%	82.66%	80.63%	83.66%	83.46%	86.87%	87.38%	85.56%	84.62%				

The following candidates were elected: Axel Andersson (S); Gunnar Björk (C); Sinikka Bohlin (S); Sigrid Bolkéus (S); Rolf Dahlberg (M); Karl Hagström (S); Hans Lindblad (FP); Bertil Måbrink (VPK); Iris Mårtensson (S); Olle Östrand (S); Inger Schörling (MP); and Karin Starrin (C).

===== 1985 =====
Results of the 1985 general election held on 15 September 1985:

Party		Votes per municipality										Total votes	%	Seats		
Party		Boll- näs	Gävle	Hofors	Hudiks- vall	Ljus- dal	Nordan- stig	Ockel- bo	Ovanå- ker	Sand- viken	Söder- hamn	Total votes	%	Con.	Lev.	Tot.
Swedish Social Democratic Party	S	9,464	32,898	5,622	11,809	6,755	3,502	2,370	4,201	16,838	12,954	106,413	53.60%	6	1	7
Centre Party	C	3,331	4,552	642	5,201	2,781	2,225	981	2,542	2,918	2,323	27,496	13.85%	2	0	2
Moderate Party	M	2,346	9,544	731	3,037	1,628	711	460	1,028	3,580	2,188	25,253	12.72%	1	1	2
Liberal People's Party	FP	2,234	8,387	637	2,569	1,589	683	350	1,133	2,741	1,819	22,142	11.15%	1	0	1
Left Party – Communists	VPK	1,273	3,795	829	1,842	1,209	467	253	259	1,823	1,622	13,372	6.74%	1	0	1
Green Party	MP	326	1,028	61	525	260	200	54	222	293	245	3,214	1.62%	0	0	0
Other parties		16	175	10	33	22	7	9	27	312	29	640	0.32%	0	0	0
Valid votes		18,990	60,379	8,532	25,016	14,244	7,795	4,477	9,412	28,505	21,180	198,530	100.00%	11	2	13
Rejected votes		163	448	60	215	99	56	22	74	165	140	1,442	0.72%			
Total polled		19,153	60,827	8,592	25,231	14,343	7,851	4,499	9,486	28,670	21,320	199,972	88.77%			
Registered electors		21,807	68,228	9,506	28,993	16,897	8,982	5,156	10,469	31,445	23,791	225,274				
Turnout		87.83%	89.15%	90.39%	87.02%	84.88%	87.41%	87.26%	90.61%	91.18%	89.61%	88.77%				

The following candidates were elected: Axel Andersson (S); Gunnar Björk (C); Wivi-Anne Cederqvist (S); Rolf Dahlberg (M); Ing-Marie Hansson (S); Lennart Holmsten (S); Gunnel Jonäng (C); Hans Lindblad (FP); Bertil Måbrink (VPK); Iris Mårtensson (S); Olle Östrand (S); Håkan Stjernlöf (M); and Olle Westberg (S).

===== 1982 =====
Results of the 1982 general election held on 19 September 1982:

Party		Votes per municipality										Total votes	%	Seats		
Party		Boll- näs	Gävle	Hofors	Hudiks- vall	Ljus- dal	Nordan- stig	Ockel- bo	Ovanå- ker	Sand- viken	Söder- hamn	Total votes	%	Con.	Lev.	Tot.
Swedish Social Democratic Party	S	9,599	33,876	5,915	11,842	7,152	3,578	2,510	4,206	17,840	13,313	109,831	54.37%	6	1	7
Centre Party	C	4,085	6,532	851	6,211	3,369	2,481	1,166	2,732	3,723	3,043	34,193	16.93%	2	0	2
Moderate Party	M	2,445	10,941	857	3,262	1,811	745	497	1,008	4,098	2,369	28,033	13.88%	2	0	2
Left Party – Communists	VPK	1,385	3,589	861	1,903	1,244	542	229	271	1,805	1,798	13,627	6.75%	1	0	1
Liberal People's Party	FP	986	3,356	288	854	569	321	140	654	1,103	711	8,982	4.45%	0	0	0
Green Party	MP	338	1,062	86	555	276	174	67	298	390	318	3,564	1.76%	0	0	0
Christian Democratic Unity	KDS	354	808	50	577	231	290	66	386	325	259	3,346	1.66%	0	0	0
K-Party	K-P	11	34	13	24	17	6	0	5	21	75	206	0.10%	0	0	0
Other parties		10	101	8	17	2	2	0	6	80	14	240	0.12%	0	0	0
Valid votes		19,213	60,299	8,929	25,245	14,671	8,139	4,675	9,566	29,385	21,900	202,022	100.00%	11	1	12
Rejected votes		139	496	48	219	136	59	34	58	184	145	1,518	0.75%			
Total polled		19,352	60,795	8,977	25,464	14,807	8,198	4,709	9,624	29,569	22,045	203,540	90.75%			
Registered electors		21,595	66,989	9,704	28,590	16,945	9,125	5,223	10,422	31,835	23,861	224,289				
Turnout		89.61%	90.75%	92.51%	89.07%	87.38%	89.84%	90.16%	92.34%	92.88%	92.39%	90.75%				

The following candidates were elected: Stig Alftin (S); Axel Andersson (S); Gunnar Björk (C); Wivi-Anne Cederqvist (S); Rolf Dahlberg (M); Ing-Marie Hansson (S); Gunnel Jonäng (C); Bertil Måbrink (VPK); Iris Mårtensson (S); Olle Östrand (S); Håkan Stjernlöf (M); and Olle Westberg (S).

==== 1970s ====
===== 1979 =====
Results of the 1979 general election held on 16 September 1979:

Party		Votes per municipality										Total votes	%	Seats		
Party		Boll- näs	Gävle	Hofors	Hudiks- vall	Ljus- dal	Nordan- stig	Ockel- bo	Ovanå- ker	Sand- viken	Söder- hamn	Total votes	%	Con.	Lev.	Tot.
Swedish Social Democratic Party	S	8,681	31,689	5,826	11,125	6,731	3,372	2,409	4,008	17,062	12,810	103,713	52.25%	6	1	7
Centre Party	C	4,792	7,872	1,067	7,448	3,868	2,815	1,377	3,126	4,481	3,700	40,546	20.43%	2	1	3
Moderate Party	M	1,804	8,561	635	2,383	1,319	510	340	853	3,096	1,810	21,311	10.74%	1	0	1
Liberal People's Party	FP	1,599	6,125	511	1,453	1,000	495	225	871	2,136	1,268	15,683	7.90%	1	0	1
Left Party – Communists	VPK	1,382	3,433	883	1,910	1,287	540	199	254	1,775	1,681	13,344	6.72%	1	0	1
Christian Democratic Unity	KDS	319	664	47	339	224	249	39	313	310	208	2,712	1.37%	0	0	0
Communist Party of Sweden	SKP	28	204	48	57	4	8	13	1	68	20	451	0.23%	0	0	0
Workers' Party – The Communists	APK	44	10	12	64	47	0	0	12	24	103	316	0.16%	0	0	0
Other parties		56	136	8	61	9	7	6	17	65	67	432	0.22%	0	0	0
Valid votes		18,705	58,694	9,037	24,840	14,489	7,996	4,608	9,455	29,017	21,667	198,508	100.00%	11	2	13
Rejected votes		80	291	26	120	67	45	16	47	116	75	883	0.44%			
Total polled		18,785	58,985	9,063	24,960	14,556	8,041	4,624	9,502	29,133	21,742	199,391	89.78%			
Registered electors		21,191	65,749	9,958	28,158	16,925	8,996	5,125	10,322	31,829	23,844	222,097				
Turnout		88.65%	89.71%	91.01%	88.64%	86.00%	89.38%	90.22%	92.06%	91.53%	91.18%	89.78%				

The following candidates were elected: Stig Alftin (S); Axel Andersson (S); Gunnar Björk (C); Wivi-Anne Cederqvist (S); Rolf Dahlberg (M); Ing-Marie Hansson (S); Gunnel Jonäng (C); Hans Lindblad (FP); Bertil Måbrink (VPK); Iris Mårtensson (S); Johan A. Olsson (C); Olle Östrand (S); and Olle Westberg (S).

===== 1976 =====
Results of the 1976 general election held on 19 September 1976:

Party		Votes per municipality										Total votes	%	Seats		
Party		Boll- näs	Gävle	Hofors	Hudiks- vall	Ljus- dal	Nordan- stig	Ockel- bo	Ovanå- ker	Sand- viken	Söder- hamn	Total votes	%	Con.	Lev.	Tot.
Swedish Social Democratic Party	S	8,549	31,056	5,672	10,605	6,647	3,177	2,368	3,732	16,784	12,664	101,254	50.89%	6	1	7
Centre Party	C	5,815	11,432	1,441	8,718	4,887	3,232	1,498	3,647	5,997	4,803	51,470	25.87%	3	0	3
People's Party	F	1,673	6,194	503	1,544	965	503	231	880	1,985	1,262	15,740	7.91%	1	0	1
Moderate Party	M	1,181	5,908	494	1,589	807	305	262	555	2,278	1,394	14,773	7.43%	1	0	1
Left Party – Communists	VPK	1,285	2,811	1,028	1,783	1,235	531	129	229	1,691	1,773	12,495	6.28%	1	0	1
Christian Democratic Unity	KDS	307	667	55	265	242	173	31	253	260	160	2,413	1.21%	0	0	0
Communist Party of Sweden	SKP	82	227	33	77	46	32	13	21	63	54	648	0.33%	0	0	0
Other parties		11	62	0	30	5	2	3	0	9	34	156	0.08%	0	0	0
Valid votes		18,903	58,357	9,226	24,611	14,834	7,955	4,535	9,317	29,067	22,144	198,949	100.00%	12	1	13
Rejected votes		52	118	24	75	32	20	7	33	81	65	507	0.25%			
Total polled		18,955	58,475	9,250	24,686	14,866	7,975	4,542	9,350	29,148	22,209	199,456	90.52%			
Registered electors		21,090	64,711	10,201	27,557	17,005	8,859	5,027	10,151	31,668	24,082	220,351				
Turnout		89.88%	90.36%	90.68%	89.58%	87.42%	90.02%	90.35%	92.11%	92.04%	92.22%	90.52%				

The following candidates were elected: Stig Alftin (S); Axel Andersson (S); Gunnar Björk (C); Wivi-Anne Cederqvist (S); Rolf Dahlberg (M); Åke Gillström (S); Gunnel Jonäng (C); Hans Lindblad (F); Bertil Måbrink (VPK); Iris Mårtensson (S); Johan A. Olsson (C); Olle Östrand (S); and Olle Westberg (S).

===== 1973 =====
Results of the 1973 general election held on 16 September 1973:

Party		Votes per municipality										Total votes	%	Seats		
Party		Boll- näs	Gävle	Hofors	Hudiks- vall	Ljus- dal	Nordan- stig	Ockel- bo	Ovanå- ker	Sand- viken	Söder- hamn	Total votes	%	Con.	Lev.	Tot.
Swedish Social Democratic Party	S	9,339	28,543	5,376	9,839	6,279	3,081	2,309	2,348	15,855	11,812	94,781	50.09%	6	1	7
Centre Party	C	7,237	11,064	1,549	8,240	4,491	3,092	1,452	1,737	5,899	4,455	49,216	26.01%	3	0	3
Left Party – Communists	VPK	1,606	3,322	1,273	2,233	1,651	569	188	204	2,179	2,236	15,461	8.17%	1	0	1
Moderate Party	M	1,186	5,098	489	1,447	729	267	239	275	2,059	1,461	13,250	7.00%	1	0	1
People's Party	F	1,818	4,624	397	1,118	942	497	208	525	1,578	1,000	12,707	6.72%	1	0	1
Christian Democratic Unity	KDS	448	811	60	424	240	196	52	183	319	212	2,945	1.56%	0	0	0
Communist Party of Sweden	SKP	114	134	8	114	27	26	6	2	19	71	521	0.28%	0	0	0
Communist League Marxist–Leninists (the revolutionaries)	KFML(r)	8	121	45	23	34	1	1	0	80	4	317	0.17%	0	0	0
Other parties		3	7	0	4	4	1	0	0	4	0	23	0.01%	0	0	0
Valid votes		21,759	53,724	9,197	23,442	14,397	7,730	4,455	5,274	27,992	21,251	189,221	100.00%	12	1	13
Rejected votes		39	73	6	29	11	10	0	4	39	21	232	0.12%			
Total polled		21,798	53,797	9,203	23,471	14,408	7,740	4,455	5,278	28,031	21,272	189,453	89.68%			
Registered electors		24,286	60,544	10,160	26,437	16,653	8,621	4,974	5,782	30,654	23,145	211,256				
Turnout		89.76%	88.86%	90.58%	88.78%	86.52%	89.78%	89.57%	91.28%	91.44%	91.91%	89.68%				

The following candidates were elected: Gunnar Björk (C); Sven Ekström (S); John Eriksson (C); Åke Gillström (S); Anders Haglund (S); Gunnel Jonäng (C); Bertil Löfberg (S); Bertil Måbrink (VPK); Hans Nordgren (M); Olle Östrand (S); Gunbjörg Thunvall (S); Olle Westberg (S); and Olle Westberg (F).

Permanent substitutions:

- John Eriksson (C) died on 6 March 1974 and was replaced by Johan A. Olsson (C) on 12 March 1974.
- Bertil Löfberg (S) resigned on 19 May 1975 upon being appointed Governor of Västernorrland County and was replaced by Stig Alftin (S) on 20 May 1975.

===== 1970 =====
Results of the 1970 general election held on 20 September 1970:

Party		Votes per municipality																		Total votes	%	Seats		
Party		Alfta	Arbrå	Bergs- jö	Boll- näs	Gävle	Gnarp	Hane- bo	Harmån- ger	Has- sela	Hofors	Hudiks- vall	Ljus- dal	Ockel- bo	Ovanå- ker	Rengs- jö	Sand- viken	Söder- hamn	Postal votes	Total votes	%	Con.	Lev.	Tot.
Swedish Social Democratic Party	S	1,244	1,232	601	4,331	25,189	620	1,220	1,200	501	5,016	8,661	5,907	2,267	2,355	327	14,385	10,449	10,098	95,603	52.03%	6	1	7
Centre Party	C	1,281	764	752	2,339	6,890	534	806	1,001	273	1,209	6,665	3,454	1,178	1,260	325	4,366	3,068	3,678	39,843	21.69%	3	0	3
People's Party	F	383	445	132	1,059	6,100	186	167	164	78	581	1,365	1,112	301	573	46	2,146	1,143	3,699	19,680	10.71%	1	0	1
Left Party – Communists	VPK	136	294	175	812	2,647	72	222	201	91	1,204	1,964	1,572	153	204	136	1,858	1,882	1,151	14,774	8.04%	1	0	1
Moderate Party	M	137	131	52	386	2,566	34	59	83	17	352	881	427	182	237	31	1,154	951	2,764	10,444	5.68%	1	0	1
Christian Democratic Unity	KDS	78	54	43	130	606	45	20	76	20	65	283	178	37	154	6	245	156	372	2,568	1.40%	0	0	0
Communist League Marxists-Leninists	KFML	2	10	4	36	283	1	9	3	2	16	25	41	8	3	6	124	65	170	808	0.44%	0	0	0
Other parties		0	0	0	0	0	0	0	0	0	0	0	0	0	0	0	0	0	11	11	0.01%	0	0	0
Valid votes		3,261	2,930	1,759	9,093	44,281	1,492	2,503	2,728	982	8,443	19,844	12,691	4,126	4,786	877	24,278	17,714	21,943	183,731	100.00%	12	1	13
Rejected votes		8	2	2	9	32	2	2	4	0	1	13	8	2	4	0	17	10	78	194	0.11%			
Total polled exc. postal votes		3,269	2,932	1,761	9,102	44,313	1,494	2,505	2,732	982	8,444	19,857	12,699	4,128	4,790	877	24,295	17,724	22,021	183,925				
Postal votes		229	449	155	1,511	7,247	120	255	284	75	880	2,464	1,475	310	373	77	2,936	3,137	-22,021	-44				
Total polled inc. postal votes		3,498	3,381	1,916	10,613	51,560	1,614	2,760	3,016	1,057	9,324	22,321	14,174	4,438	5,163	954	27,231	20,861	0	183,881	86.59%			
Registered electors		3,884	3,902	2,244	12,579	60,151	1,906	3,060	3,381	1,198	10,667	26,289	16,975	5,181	5,785	1,075	30,695	23,397		212,369				
Turnout		90.06%	86.65%	85.38%	84.37%	85.72%	84.68%	90.20%	89.20%	88.23%	87.41%	84.91%	83.50%	85.66%	89.25%	88.74%	88.71%	89.16%		86.59%				

The following candidates were elected: Gunnar Björk (C); Sven Ekström (S); John Eriksson (C); Anders Haglund (S); Gunnel Jonäng (C); Bertil Löfberg (S); Bertil Måbrink (VPK); Yngve Möller (S); Hans Nordgren (M); Erik Svedberg (S); Gunbjörg Thunvall (S); Olle Westberg (S); and Olle Westberg (F).

Permanent substitutions:

- Yngve Möller (S) resigned upon being appointed ambassador to Norway and was replaced by Olle Östrand (S) in January 1973.
