= List of members of the Riksdag, 2010–2014 =

This is a list of members of the Swedish parliament for the term 2010–2014. The MPs were elected in the general election held on 19 September 2010 and took office on 4 October 2010. The next general election, when a new parliament is elected, took place in 2014.

== Composition ==
Composition of the Swedish parliament.

Parties currently in the government are marked in bold.

Party/bloc	Seats	Party leader(s)	Parliamentary group leader(s)
Social Democrats	112	Stefan Löfven	Mikael Damberg
**Moderate**	107	Fredrik Reinfeldt	Anna Kinberg Batra
Green	25	Åsa Romson, Gustav Fridolin (spokespersons)	Mehmet Kaplan, Gunvor G Ericson
**Liberals**	24	Jan Björklund	Johan Pehrson
**Centre**	23	Annie Lööf	Anders W Jonsson
Sweden Democrats	20	Jimmie Åkesson	Björn Söder
Left	19	Jonas Sjöstedt	Hans Linde
**Christian Democrats**	19	Göran Hägglund	Emma Henriksson
**The Alliance** (Moderate, Liberals, Centre, Christian Democrats)	173		
Red-Greens (Social Democrats, Green, Left)	156		
Total	349		
Government minority	2		

== List of elected MPs ==
Seat	Member of Parliament	Party	Constituency
188	Erik A. Eriksson	Centre	Värmland County
23	Maria Abrahamsson	Moderate	Stockholm Municipality
213	Christer Adelsbo	Social Democrats	Skåne County North and East
24	Lena Adelsohn Liljeroth	Moderate	Stockholm Municipality
2	Carina Adolfsson Elgestam	Social Democrats	Kronoberg County
19	Ann-Christin Ahlberg	Social Democrats	Västra Götaland County South
156	Urban Ahlin	Social Democrats	Västra Götaland County East
39	Christer Akej	Moderate	Skåne County North and East
256	Thoralf Alfsson	Sweden Democrats	Östergötland County
152	Erik Almqvist	Sweden Democrats	Västra Götaland County North
327	Jabar Amin	Green	Västerbotten County
TBA	Anders Andersson	Christian Democrats	Kalmar County
TBA	Jan R. Andersson	Moderate	Kalmar County
TBA	Johan Andersson	Social Democrats	Östergötland County
TBA	Jörgen Andersson	Moderate	Kalmar County
TBA	Magdalena Andersson	Moderate	Jönköping County
TBA	Phia Andersson	Social Democrats	Västra Götaland County South
TBA	Ulla Andersson	Left	Gävleborg County
TBA	Yvonne Andersson	Christian Democrats	Östergötland County
TBA	Staffan Anger	Moderate	Västmanland County
TBA	Sofia Arkelsten	Moderate	Stockholm Municipality
TBA	Ann Arleklo	Social Democrats	Skåne County West
TBA	Beatrice Ask	Moderate	Stockholm Municipality
TBA	Lena Asplund	Moderate	Västernorrland County
TBA	Stefan Attefall	Christian Democrats	Jönköping County
TBA	Anti Avsan	Moderate	Stockholm County
TBA	Lennart Axelsson	Social Democrats	Örebro County
TBA	Gunnar Axén	Moderate	Östergötland County
TBA	Margareta B. Kjellin	Moderate	Gävleborg County
TBA	Hans Backman	Liberals	Gävleborg County
TBA	Hanif Bali	Moderate	Stockholm County
TBA	Ibrahim Baylan	Social Democrats	Västerbotten County
TBA	Lars Beckman	Moderate	Gävleborg County
TBA	Eva Bengtson Skogsberg	Moderate	Kalmar County
TBA	Finn Bengtsson	Moderate	Östergötland County
TBA	Bengt Berg	Left	Värmland County
TBA	Marianne Berg	Left	Malmö Municipality
TBA	Ulf Berg	Moderate	Dalarna County
TBA	Sten Bergheden	Moderate	Västra Götaland County East
TBA	Håkan Bergman	Social Democrats	Örebro County
TBA	Hannah Bergstedt	Social Democrats	Norrbotten County
TBA	Stina Bergström	Green	Värmland County
TBA	Bo Bernhardsson	Social Democrats	Skåne County South
TBA	Per Bill	Moderate	Uppsala County
TBA	Tobias Billström	Moderate	Malmö Municipality
TBA	Patrik Björck	Social Democrats	Västra Götaland County East
TBA	Jan Björklund	Liberals	Stockholm County
TBA	Ewa Björling	Moderate	Stockholm County
TBA	Torbjörn Björlund	Left	Östergötland County
TBA	Elisabeth Björnsdotter Rahm	Moderate	Västerbotten County
TBA	Gustav Blix	Moderate	Stockholm Municipality
TBA	Thomas Bodström	Social Democrats	Stockholm County
TBA	Carl-Oskar Bohlin	Moderate	Dalarna County
TBA	Helena Bouveng	Moderate	Jönköping County
TBA	Josefin Brink	Left	Stockholm Municipality
TBA	Anita Brodén	Liberals	Västra Götaland County North
TBA	Anne Marie Brodén	Moderate	Halland County
TBA	Catharina Bråkenhielm	Social Democrats	Västra Götaland County West
TBA	Katarina Brännström	Moderate	Kronoberg County
TBA	Sven-Erik Bucht	Social Democrats	Norrbotten County
TBA	Agneta Börjesson	Green	Halland County
TBA	Stefan Caplan	Moderate	Västra Götaland County West
TBA	Andreas Carlgren	Centre	Stockholm Municipality
TBA	Clas-Göran Carlsson	Social Democrats	Kronoberg County
TBA	Gunilla Carlsson	Moderate	Östergötland County
TBA	Gunilla Carlsson (in Hisings Backa)	Social Democrats	Göteborg Municipality
TBA	Ulrika Carlsson (in Skövde)	Centre	Västra Götaland County East
TBA	Bodil Ceballos	Green	Gävleborg County
TBA	Mikael Cederbratt	Moderate	Västra Götaland County North
TBA	Åsa Coenraads	Moderate	Västmanland County
TBA	Mikael Damberg	Social Democrats	Stockholm County
TBA	Staffan Danielsson	Centre	Östergötland County
TBA	Marietta de Pourbaix-Lundin	Moderate	Stockholm County
TBA	Adnan Dibrani	Social Democrats	Halland County
TBA	Rossana Dinamarca	Left	Västra Götaland County North
TBA	Esabelle Dingizian	Green	Stockholm County
TBA	Susanne Eberstein	Social Democrats	Västernorrland County
TBA	Annika Eclund	Christian Democrats	Västra Götaland County East
TBA	Tina Ehn	Green	Västra Götaland County West
TBA	Magnus Ehrencrona	Green	Skåne County West
TBA	Kent Ekeroth	Sweden Democrats	Stockholm County
TBA	Hans Ekström	Social Democrats	Södermanland County
TBA	Lars Elinderson	Moderate	Västra Götaland County East
TBA	Tomas Eneroth	Social Democrats	Kronoberg County
TBA	Annicka Engblom	Moderate	Blekinge County
TBA	Christer Engelhardt	Social Democrats	Gotland County
TBA	Kerstin Engle	Social Democrats	Skåne County North and East
TBA	Hillevi Engström	Moderate	Stockholm County
TBA	Annelie Enochson	Christian Democrats	Göteborg Municipality
TBA	Karin Enström	Moderate	Stockholm County
TBA	Gunvor G. Ericson	Green	Södermanland County
TBA	Jan Ericson	Moderate	Västra Götaland County South
TBA	Jonas Eriksson	Green	Örebro County
TBA	Peter Eriksson	Green	Stockholm County
TBA	Eskil Erlandsson	Centre	Kronoberg County
TBA	Matilda Ernkrans	Social Democrats	Örebro County
TBA	Jan Ertsborn	Liberals	Halland County
TBA	Fredrick Federley	Centre	Stockholm Municipality
TBA	Maria Ferm	Green	Malmö Municipality
TBA	Thomas Finnborg	Moderate	Skåne County West
TBA	Lotta Finstorp	Moderate	Södermanland County
TBA	Anders Flanking	Centre	Göteborg Municipality
TBA	Eva Flyborg	Liberals	Göteborg Municipality
TBA	Johan Forssell	Moderate	Stockholm Municipality
TBA	Josef Fransson	Sweden Democrats	Malmö Municipality
TBA	Gustav Fridolin	Green	Skåne County North and East
TBA	Isak From	Social Democrats	Västerbotten County
TBA	Kenneth G. Forslund	Social Democrats	Västra Götaland County West
TBA	Mats Gerdau	Moderate	Stockholm County
TBA	Agneta Gille	Social Democrats	Uppsala County
TBA	Karin Granbom Ellison	Liberals	Östergötland County
TBA	Marie Granlund	Social Democrats	Malmö Municipality
TBA	Monica Green	Social Democrats	Västra Götaland County East
TBA	Roza Güclü Hedin	Social Democrats	Dalarna County
TBA	Jonas Gunnarsson	Social Democrats	Värmland County
TBA	Penilla Gunther	Christian Democrats	Västra Götaland County North
TBA	Billy Gustafsson	Social Democrats	Östergötland County
TBA	Lars Gustafsson	Christian Democrats	Halland County
TBA	Walburga Habsburg Douglas	Moderate	Södermanland County
TBA	Susanna Haby	Moderate	Göteborg Municipality
TBA	Roger Haddad	Liberals	Västmanland County
TBA	Liselott Hagberg	Liberals	Södermanland County
TBA	Kerstin Haglö	Social Democrats	Blekinge County
TBA	Robert Halef	Christian Democrats	Stockholm Municipality
TBA	Lena Hallengren	Social Democrats	Kalmar County
TBA	Pia Hallström	Moderate	Värmland County
TBA	Arhe Hamednaca	Social Democrats	Stockholm Municipality
TBA	Carl B. Hamilton	Liberals	Stockholm Municipality
TBA	Ann-Charlotte Hammar Johnsson	Moderate	Skåne County West
TBA	Krister Hammarbergh	Moderate	Norrbotten County
TBA	Anders Hansson	Moderate	Skåne County South
TBA	Jörgen Hellman	Social Democrats	Västra Götaland County North
TBA	Caroline Helmersson Olsson	Social Democrats	Södermanland County
TBA	Emma Henriksson	Christian Democrats	Stockholm County
TBA	Carina Herrstedt	Sweden Democrats	Södermanland County
TBA	Shadiye Heydari	Social Democrats	Göteborg Municipality
TBA	Lars Hjälmered	Moderate	Göteborg Municipality
TBA	Hans Hoff	Social Democrats	Halland County
TBA	Gustaf Hoffstedt	Moderate	Gotland County
TBA	Christian Holm	Moderate	Värmland County
TBA	Jens Holm	Left	Stockholm Municipality
TBA	Ulf Holm	Green	Skåne County South
TBA	Siv Holma	Left	Norrbotten County
TBA	Johan Hultberg	Moderate	Kronoberg County
TBA	Peter Hultqvist	Social Democrats	Dalarna County
TBA	Cristina Husmark Pehrsson	Moderate	Skåne County West
TBA	Carina Hägg	Social Democrats	Jönköping County
TBA	Göran Hägglund	Christian Democrats	Stockholm Municipality
TBA	Kent Härstedt	Social Democrats	Skåne County West
TBA	Berit Högman	Social Democrats	Värmland County
TBA	Christina Höj Larsen	Left	Västernorrland County
TBA	Lars Isovaara	Sweden Democrats	Uppsala County
TBA	Jonas Jacobsson	Moderate	Skåne County West
TBA	Leif Jakobsson	Social Democrats	Malmö Municipality
TBA	Eva-Lena Jansson	Social Democrats	Örebro County
TBA	Mikael Jansson	Sweden Democrats	Halland County
TBA	Peter Jeppsson	Social Democrats	Blekinge County
TBA	Isabella Jernbeck	Moderate	Stockholm County
TBA	Ann-Kristine Johansson	Social Democrats	Värmland County
TBA	Annie Johansson	Centre	Jönköping County
TBA	Bengt-Anders Johansson	Moderate	Jönköping County
TBA	Kenneth Johansson	Centre	Dalarna County
TBA	Lars Johansson	Social Democrats	Göteborg Municipality
TBA	Mats Johansson	Moderate	Stockholm Municipality
TBA	Morgan Johansson	Social Democrats	Skåne County South
TBA	Ola Johansson	Centre	Halland County
TBA	Wiwi Anne Johansson	Left	Västra Götaland County West
TBA	Ylva Johansson	Social Democrats	Stockholm Municipality
TBA	Jacob Johnson	Left	Uppsala County
TBA	Per-Ingvar Johnsson	Centre	Skåne County North and East
TBA	Peter Johnsson	Social Democrats	Västra Götaland County North
TBA	Richard Jomshof	Sweden Democrats	Gävleborg County
TBA	Mattias Jonsson	Social Democrats	Göteborg Municipality
TBA	Håkan Juholt	Social Democrats	Kalmar County
TBA	Ellen Juntti	Moderate	Västra Götaland County West
TBA	Christine Jönsson	Moderate	Skåne County South
TBA	Amineh Kakabaveh	Left	Stockholm County
TBA	Ismail Kamil	Liberals	Uppsala County
TBA	Mehmet Kaplan	Green	Stockholm Municipality
TBA	Anders Karlsson	Social Democrats	Skåne County West
TBA	Annelie Karlsson	Social Democrats	Skåne County North and East
TBA	Christina Karlsson	Social Democrats	Västernorrland County
TBA	Mattias Karlsson	Sweden Democrats	Skåne County North and East
TBA	Sara Karlsson	Social Democrats	Södermanland County
TBA	Ulrika Karlsson (in Uppsala)	Moderate	Uppsala County
TBA	Anna Kinberg Batra	Moderate	Stockholm County
TBA	Tobias Krantz	Liberals	Jönköping County
TBA	Julia Kronlid	Sweden Democrats	Skåne County South
TBA	Kurt Kvarnström	Social Democrats	Dalarna County
TBA	Emil Källström	Centre	Västernorrland County
TBA	Katarina Köhler	Social Democrats	Västerbotten County
TBA	Anna König Jerlmyr	Moderate	Stockholm Municipality
TBA	Hillevi Larsson	Social Democrats	Malmö Municipality
TBA	Jan-Olof Larsson	Social Democrats	Västra Götaland County West
TBA	Lars Mejern Larsson	Social Democrats	Värmland County
TBA	Maria Larsson	Christian Democrats	Jönköping County
TBA	Nina Larsson	Liberals	Värmland County
TBA	Olof Lavesson	Moderate	Malmö Municipality
TBA	Helena Leander	Green	Uppsala County
TBA	Désirée Liljevall	Social Democrats	Kalmar County
TBA	Annika Lillemets	Green	Östergötland County
TBA	Johan Linander	Centre	Skåne County South
TBA	Hans Linde	Left	Göteborg Municipality
TBA	Åsa Lindestam	Social Democrats	Gävleborg County
TBA	Jan Lindholm	Green	Dalarna County
TBA	Per Lodenius	Centre	Stockholm County
TBA	Eva Lohman	Moderate	Västernorrland County
TBA	Elin Lundgren	Social Democrats	Gävleborg County
TBA	Kerstin Lundgren	Centre	Stockholm County
TBA	Fredrik Lundh Sammeli	Social Democrats	Norrbotten County
TBA	Nina Lundström	Liberals	Stockholm County
TBA	Agneta Luttropp	Green	Västmanland County
TBA	David Lång	Sweden Democrats	Stockholm Municipality
TBA	Malin Löfsjögård	Moderate	Stockholm County
TBA	Johan Löfstrand	Social Democrats	Östergötland County
TBA	Cecilia Magnusson	Moderate	Göteborg Municipality
TBA	Louise Malmström	Social Democrats	Östergötland County
TBA	Carina Moberg	Social Democrats	Stockholm County
TBA	Göran Montan	Moderate	Skåne County North and East
TBA	Valter Mutt	Green	Göteborg Municipality
TBA	Pyry Niemi	Social Democrats	Uppsala County
TBA	Gustav Nilsson	Moderate	Blekinge County
TBA	Ingemar Nilsson	Social Democrats	Västernorrland County
TBA	Jennie Nilsson	Social Democrats	Halland County
TBA	Kerstin Nilsson	Social Democrats	Skåne County South
TBA	Pia Nilsson	Social Democrats	Västmanland County
TBA	Ulf Nilsson	Liberals	Skåne County South
TBA	Ulrik Nilsson	Moderate	Västra Götaland County South
TBA	Lars-Axel Nordell	Christian Democrats	Örebro County
TBA	Marie Nordén	Social Democrats	Jämtland County
TBA	Gunilla Nordgren	Moderate	Skåne County South
TBA	Lise Nordin	Green	Göteborg Municipality
TBA	Kew Nordqvist	Green	Jönköping County
TBA	Andreas Norlén	Moderate	Östergötland County
TBA	Christer Nylander	Liberals	Skåne County North and East
TBA	Ingela Nylund Watz	Social Democrats	Stockholm County
TBA	Marta Obminska	Moderate	Uppsala County
TBA	Mats Odell	Christian Democrats	Stockholm County
TBA	Birgitta Ohlsson	Liberals	Stockholm Municipality
TBA	Carina Ohlsson	Social Democrats	Västra Götaland County East
TBA	Lars Ohly	Left	Stockholm County
TBA	Eva Olofsson	Left	Göteborg Municipality
TBA	Maud Olofsson	Centre	Västerbotten County
TBA	Fredrik Olovsson	Social Democrats	Södermanland County
TBA	Hans Olsson	Social Democrats	Västra Götaland County South
TBA	Lena Olsson	Left	Dalarna County
TBA	Jasenko Omanovic	Social Democrats	Västernorrland County
TBA	Mikael Oscarsson	Christian Democrats	Uppsala County
TBA	Christina Oskarsson	Social Democrats	Västra Götaland County North
TBA	Leif Pagrotsky	Social Democrats	Göteborg Municipality
TBA	Veronica Palm	Social Democrats	Stockholm Municipality
TBA	Johan Pehrson	Liberals	Örebro County
TBA	Kent Persson	Left	Västmanland County
TBA	Peter Persson	Social Democrats	Jönköping County
TBA	Jenny Petersson	Moderate	Halland County
TBA	Helene Petersson (in Stockaryd)	Social Democrats	Jönköping County
TBA	Désirée Pethrus Engström	Christian Democrats	Stockholm County
TBA	Göran Pettersson	Moderate	Stockholm County
TBA	Leif Pettersson	Social Democrats	Norrbotten County
TBA	Helén Pettersson (in Umeå)	Social Democrats	Västerbotten County
TBA	William Petzäll	Sweden Democrats	Dalarna County
TBA	Maria Plass	Moderate	Västra Götaland County West
TBA	Jessica Polfjärd	Moderate	Västmanland County
TBA	Margareta Pålsson	Moderate	Skåne County North and East
TBA	Raimo Pärssinen	Social Democrats	Gävleborg County
TBA	Annika Qarlsson	Centre	Västra Götaland County North
TBA	Saila Quicklund	Moderate	Jämtland County
TBA	Per Ramhorn	Sweden Democrats	Örebro County
TBA	Fredrik Reinfeldt	Moderate	Stockholm Municipality
TBA	Patrick Reslow	Moderate	Malmö Municipality
TBA	Edward Riedl	Moderate	Västerbotten County
TBA	Henrik Ripa	Moderate	Västra Götaland County North
TBA	Åsa Romson	Green	Stockholm Municipality
TBA	Eliza Roszkowska Öberg	Moderate	Stockholm County
TBA	Hans Rothenberg	Moderate	Göteborg Municipality
TBA	Carin Runeson	Social Democrats	Dalarna County
TBA	Peter Rådberg	Green	Västra Götaland County North
TBA	Jan-Evert Rådhström	Moderate	Värmland County
TBA	Nyamko Sabuni	Liberals	Stockholm County
TBA	Mona Sahlin	Social Democrats	Stockholm Municipality
TBA	Gunnar Sandberg	Social Democrats	Jämtland County
TBA	Margareta Sandstedt	Sweden Democrats	Västmanland County
TBA	Mikael Sandström	Moderate	Stockholm County
TBA	Fredrik Schulte	Moderate	Stockholm County
TBA	Anders Sellström	Christian Democrats	Västerbotten County
TBA	Karl Sigfrid	Moderate	Stockholm County
TBA	Jonas Sjöstedt	Left	Västerbotten County
TBA	Johnny Skalin	Sweden Democrats	Västra Götaland County West
TBA	Tuve Skånberg	Christian Democrats	Skåne County North and East
TBA	Eva Sonidsson	Social Democrats	Västernorrland County
TBA	Lars-Arne Staxäng	Moderate	Västra Götaland County West
TBA	Maria Stenberg	Social Democrats	Norrbotten County
TBA	Thomas Strand	Social Democrats	Jönköping County
TBA	Torkild Strandberg	Liberals	Skåne County West
TBA	Elisabeth Svantesson	Moderate	Örebro County
TBA	Gunilla Svantorp	Social Democrats	Värmland County
TBA	Per Svedberg	Social Democrats	Gävleborg County
TBA	Michael Svensson	Moderate	Halland County
TBA	Suzanne Svensson	Social Democrats	Blekinge County
TBA	Mia Sydow Mölleby	Left	Örebro County
TBA	Sven-Olof Sällström	Sweden Democrats	Göteborg Municipality
TBA	Björn Söder	Sweden Democrats	Stockholm County
TBA	Anna-Lena Sörenson	Social Democrats	Östergötland County
TBA	Cecilie Tenfjord-Toftby	Moderate	Västra Götaland County South
TBA	Ewa Thalén Finné	Moderate	Skåne County South
TBA	Olle Thorell	Social Democrats	Västmanland County
TBA	Roger Tiefensee	Centre	Södermanland County
TBA	Tomas Tobé	Moderate	Gävleborg County
TBA	Sten Tolgfors	Moderate	Örebro County
TBA	Åsa Torstensson	Centre	Västra Götaland County West
TBA	Lars Tysklind	Liberals	Västra Götaland County West
TBA	Roland Utbult	Christian Democrats	Västra Götaland County West
TBA	Anders W. Jonsson	Centre	Gävleborg County
TBA	Abdirizak Waberi	Moderate	Göteborg Municipality
TBA	Tommy Waidelich	Social Democrats	Stockholm County
TBA	Anna Wallén	Social Democrats	Västmanland County
TBA	Hans Wallmark	Moderate	Skåne County North and East
TBA	Mikaela Valtersson	Green	Stockholm County
TBA	Camilla Waltersson Grönvall	Moderate	Västra Götaland County North
TBA	H. G. Wessberg	Moderate	Stockholm Municipality
TBA	Per Westerberg	Moderate	Södermanland County
TBA	Barbro Westerholm	Liberals	Stockholm Municipality
TBA	Börje Vestlund	Social Democrats	Stockholm Municipality
TBA	Maria Wetterstrand	Green	Stockholm Municipality
TBA	Cecilia Widegren	Moderate	Västra Götaland County East
TBA	Allan Widman	Liberals	Malmö Municipality
TBA	Tony Wiklander	Sweden Democrats	Skåne County West
TBA	Jessika Vilhelmsson	Moderate	Uppsala County
TBA	Christer Winbäck	Liberals	Västra Götaland County East
TBA	Otto von Arnold	Christian Democrats	Skåne County South
TBA	Björn von Sydow	Social Democrats	Stockholm County
TBA	Henrik von Sydow	Moderate	Halland County
TBA	Maryam Yazdanfar	Social Democrats	Stockholm County
TBA	Anders Ygeman	Social Democrats	Stockholm Municipality
TBA	Solveig Zander	Centre	Uppsala County
TBA	Christina Zedell	Social Democrats	Stockholm County
TBA	Boriana Åberg	Moderate	Skåne County South
TBA	Åsa Ågren Wikström	Moderate	Norrbotten County
TBA	Jonas Åkerlund	Sweden Democrats	Blekinge County
TBA	Anders Åkesson	Centre	Kalmar County
TBA	Jimmie Åkesson	Sweden Democrats	Jönköping County
TBA	Ann-Britt Åsebol	Moderate	Dalarna County
TBA	Per Åsling	Centre	Jämtland County
TBA	Karin Åström	Social Democrats	Norrbotten County
TBA	Oskar Öholm	Moderate	Örebro County
TBA	Krister Örnfjäder	Social Democrats	Kalmar County
TBA	Sven-Erik Österberg	Social Democrats	Västmanland County
TBA	Thomas Östros	Social Democrats	Uppsala County

== Facts about the elected MPs ==
- Youngest MP: William Petzäll (born 1988).
- Oldest MP: Barbro Westerholm (born 1933).
- Longest serving MP: Per Westerberg (since 1977).
- Gender balance: 192 (55%) men and 157 (45%) women.
- Number of MPs who have never served in the parliament before: 106.
- Number of MPs who served in the parliament during the previous term: 233.
- Number of MPs have who served as MPs or substitutes during any other previous terms: 10.
