= Roger Hedlund =

Roger Hedlund may refer to:

- Roger E. Hedlund (born 1935), American pastor
- Roger Hedlund (politician) (born 1979), Swedish politician
