= John Erickson =

John Erickson may refer to:

- John E. Erickson (Montana politician) (1863–1946), American politician from Montana
- John E. Erickson (basketball) (1927–2020), American basketball coach and executive, Wisconsin politician
- John P. Erickson (1826–1907), American Civil War sailor and Medal of Honor recipient
- John Erickson (golfer) (born 1964), American golfer
- John Erickson (historian) (1929–2002), British historian and defence expert
- John R. Erickson (born 1943), author of the Hank the Cowdog book series
- John C. Erickson, founder of Erickson Retirement Communities
- John H. Erickson, dean of Saint Vladimir's Orthodox Theological Seminary in the United States
- John Erickson (Oregon politician), former Oregon Superintendent of Public Instruction

== See also ==
- Jon Erickson (disambiguation)
- John Ericson (born 1926), German-American actor
- John Ericsson (1803–1889), inventor
- John Ericsson (actor)
- John Eriksen (1957–2002), Danish footballer
- John Eriksson (footballer) (1929–2020), Swedish footballer
- John Eriksson (mycologist) (1921–1995), Swedish mycologist
- John Eriksson (musician) (born 1974), Swedish musician, member of Peter Bjorn and John
- John Eriksson i Bäckmora (1915–1974), Swedish politician
- Jon Erikson (1955–2014), American swimmer
