= Kristoffer Lindberg =

Swedish politician (born 1992)

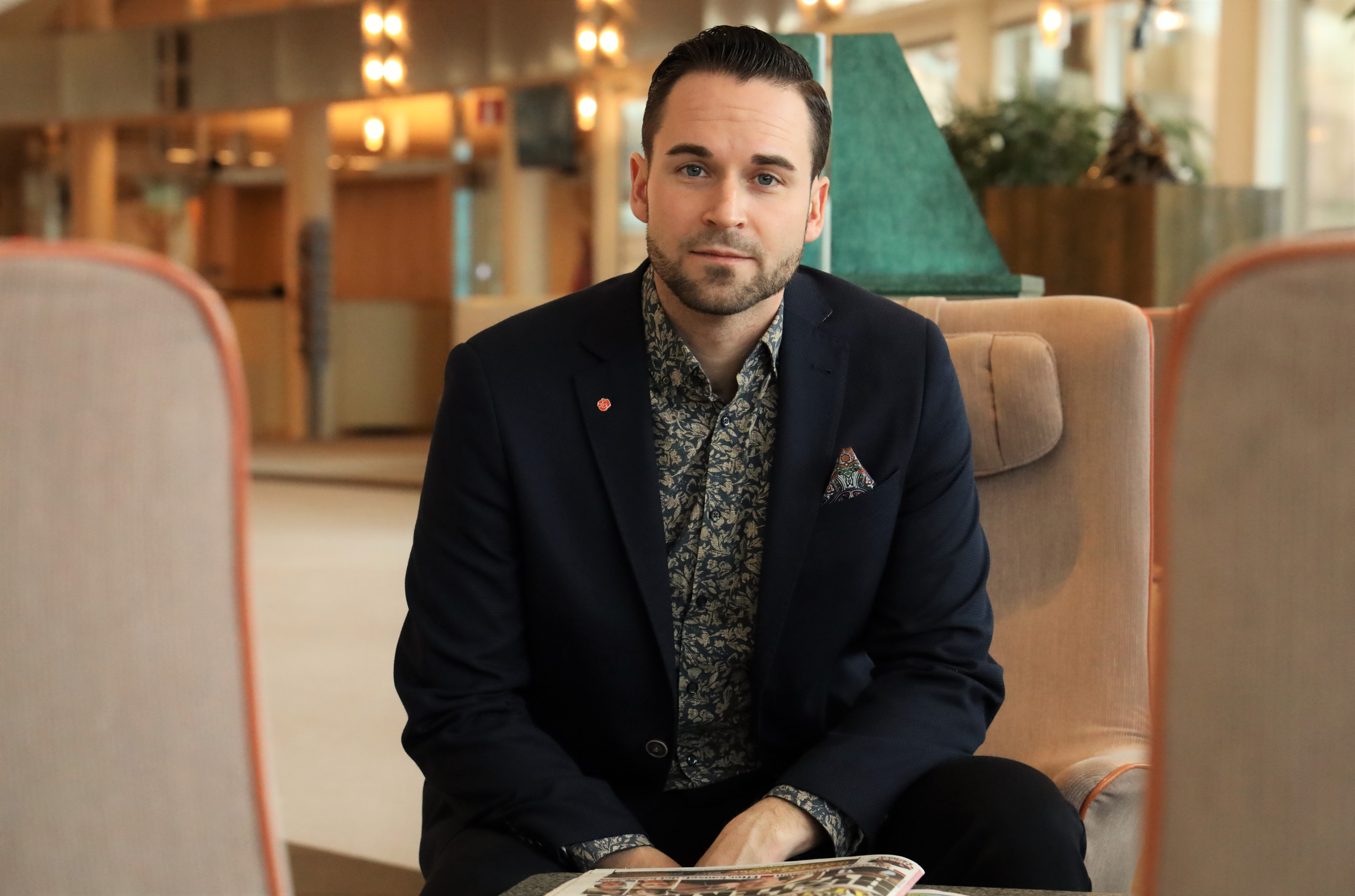
- Lindberg in 2022

Member of the Riksdag
- Incumbent
- Assumed office 26 September 2022
- Constituency: Gävleborg County

Personal details
- Born: Kristoffer Lindberg; 1992 (age 33–34)
- Party: Social Democratic Party

Kristoffer Lindberg (born 1992) is a Swedish politician and member of the Riksdag, the national legislature. A member of the Social Democratic Party, he has represented Gävleborg County since September 2022. He had previously been a substitute member of the Riksdag for Patrik Lundqvist between November 2021 to December 2021.
