= Lili André =

Swedish politician (born 1970)

Member of the Riksdag
- Incumbent
- Assumed office 2022
- Constituency: Gävleborg County

Personal details
- Born: 1970 (age 55–56) Gävle, Gävleborg County, Sweden
- Party: Christian Democrats
- Education: Gävle University College

Lili Helena André (born 1970) is a Swedish politician from the Christian Democrats. She has been a member of the Riksdag since 2022, elected for the Gävleborg County constituency.

== Biography ==
Lili André has a bachelor's degree in electronics from the University of Gävle, where she has also been a teacher.

André has previously been a process manager in innovation and digitalization. She is the chairwoman of KD Gävleborg and since 2017 André has been elected to the Christian Democrats' party board. André competed as a challenger in the Gladiators in 2002. The competition was held in Västerås.

== See also ==
- List of members of the Riksdag, 2022–2026
