= Caroline Schmidt =

Swedish politician (born 1960)

Member of the Riksdag
- Incumbent
- Assumed office 28 September 2026
- Constituency: Gävleborg County

Personal details
- Born: 1960 (age 65–66)
- Party: Centre Party

Sara Caroline Schmidt Johnsson (born 1960) is a Swedish politician for the Centre Party. She has been a member of the Riksdag since 2026, elected for the Gävleborg County constituency. Caroline Schmidt was the chairwoman of the municipal board in Hudiksvall Municipality during the term of office 2010–2014. She has been an opposition councilor and second vice chairwoman of the municipal board since 2014.

== See also ==
- List of members of the Riksdag, 2026–2030
