= Viktor Wärnick =

Swedish politician (born 1991)

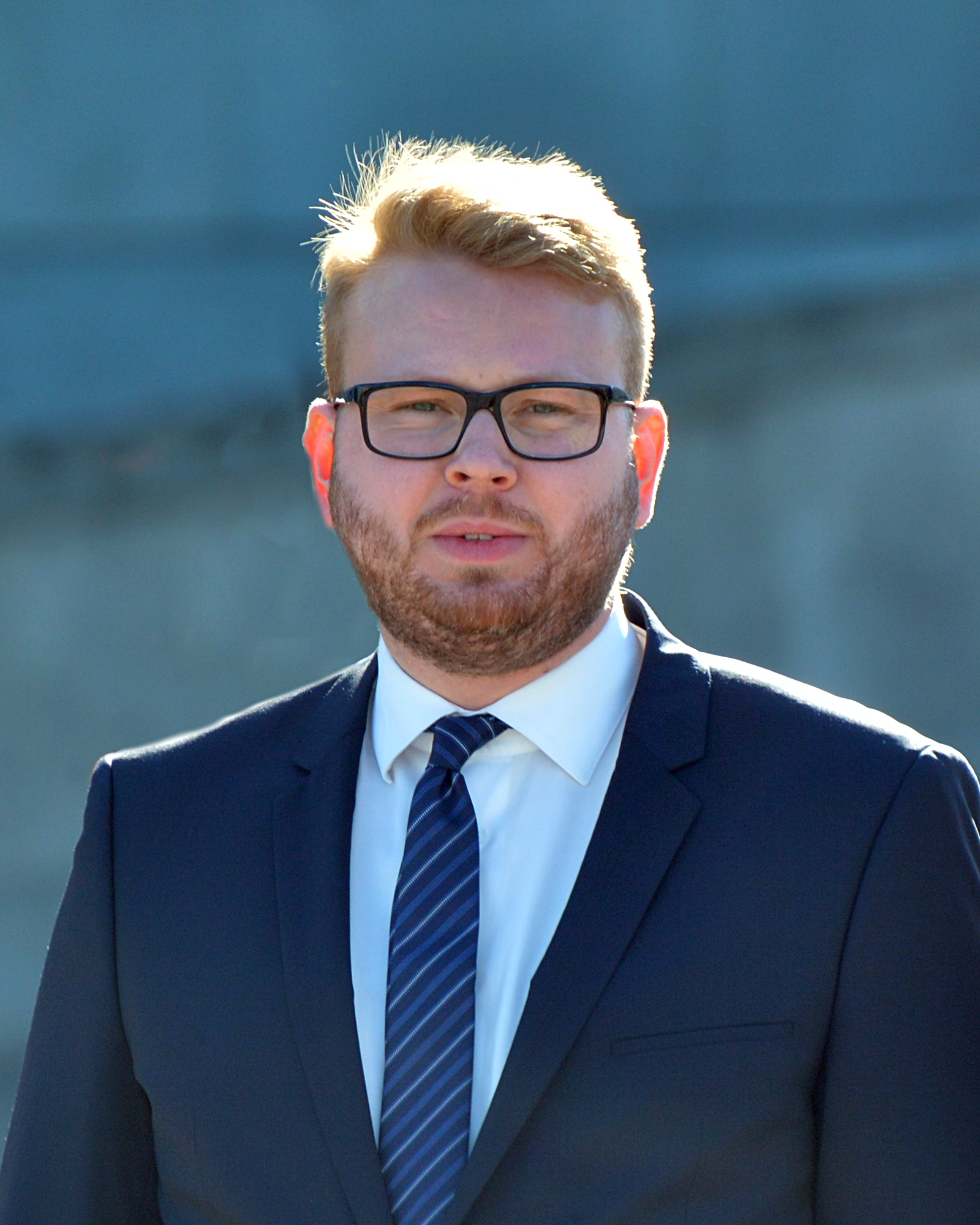

Member of the Riksdag
- Incumbent
- Assumed office 24 September 2018
- Constituency: Gävleborg County

Personal details
- Born: 1991 (age 34–35)
- Party: Moderate Party

Viktor Wärnick (born 1991) is a Swedish politician. Since September 2018, he serves as Member of the Riksdag representing the constituency of Gävleborg County.

He was also elected as Member of the Riksdag in September 2022.
