= Jon Erickson =

Jon Erickson may refer to:

- Jon David Erickson (born 1969), ecological economist
- Jon Erickson, author of Hacking: The Art of Exploitation

== See also ==
- John Erickson (disambiguation)
- John Ericson (born 1926), German-American actor
