= Anders Schröder =

Swedish politician

Member of the Swedish Parliament for Gävleborg
- In office 2014–2018

Personal details
- Born: 1990 (age 34–35)
- Party: Miljöpartiet

Anders Erik Johannes Schröder (born 1990) is a Swedish politician representing the Swedish Green Party. He was a member of parliament for Gävleborg and in that position he was suppleant in the Committee on Transport and Communications, Committee on Environment and Agriculture, and Committee on Justice.
