= Sanna Backeskog =

Swedish politician (born 1985)

Member of the Riksdag
- Incumbent
- Assumed office 26 September 2022
- Constituency: Gävleborg County

Personal details
- Born: 1985 (age 40–41)
- Party: Social Democrats

Sanna Backeskog (born 1985) is a Swedish politician. She was elected as Member of the Riksdag in September 2022. She represents the constituency of Gävleborg County. She is affiliated with the Social Democrats.
