= Samuel Gonzalez Westling =

Swedish politician (born 1983)

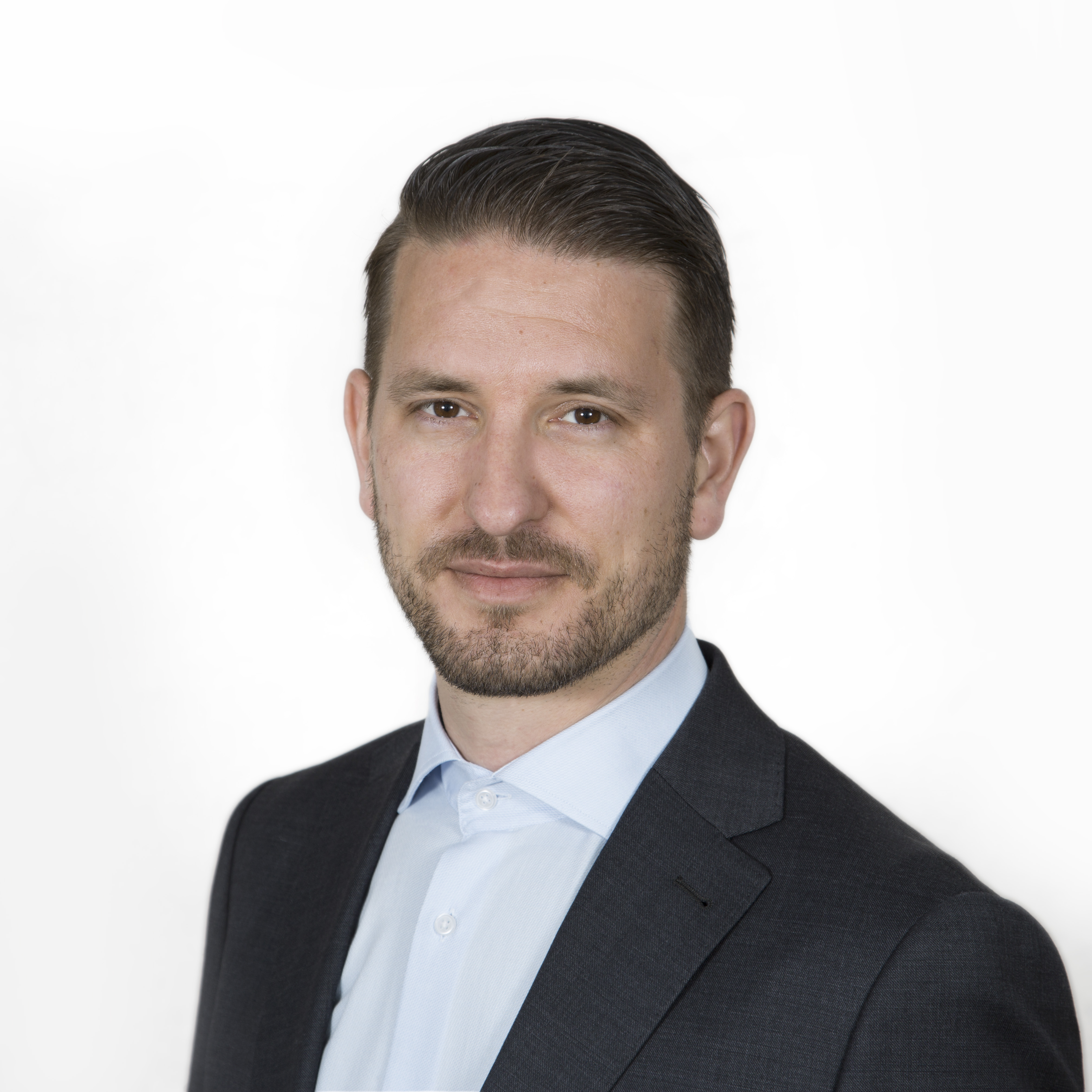
- Samuel Gonzalez Westling (2022)

Member of the Riksdag
- Incumbent
- Assumed office 26 September 2022
- Constituency: Gävleborg County

Personal details
- Born: January 14, 1983 (age 43)
- Party: Left Party

Samuel Gonzalez Westling (born 1983) is a Swedish politician. He was elected as Member of the Riksdag in September 2022. He represents the constituency of Gävleborg County. He is affiliated with the Left Party.
