= Mattias Eriksson Falk =

Swedish politician (born 1990)

Member of the Riksdag
- Incumbent
- Assumed office 26 September 2022
- Constituency: Södermanland County

Personal details
- Born: 1990 (age 35–36) Bomhus, Sweden
- Party: Sweden Democrats

Mattias Eriksson Falk (born 1990) is a Swedish politician of the Sweden Democrats party who has been a Member of the Riksdag since 2022 representing Södermanland County.

Falk grew up in Bomhus and worked as a bus driver after leaving school. He was elected as a county councilor for the Sweden Democrats in Gävleborg and was appointed regional chairman and group leader of the SD in Gävleborg in 2019, holding the post until his election to the Riksdag in 2022. In the Riksdag, Falk sits on the committees for finance and the labour market. He takes parliamentary seat 117.
