= Per-Olof Svensson =

Swedish politician

Per‑Olof Svensson

Member of the Riksdag
- In office 1998–2006
- Constituency: Gävleborg County

Municipal Commissioner of Ljusdal Municipality
- In office January 1992 – December 1998

Chair of the Board, Region Gävleborg
- Incumbent
- Assumed office February 2007

Chair of the Board, Almi Invest N. Sweden AB
- Incumbent
- Assumed office 2008

Personal details
- Born: January 13, 1942 Ytterlännäs Parish, Västernorrland County, Sweden
- Died: October 12, 2012 (aged 70) Ljusdal‑Ramsjö Parish, Sweden
- Party: Social Democrats
- Occupation: Politician

Per‑Olof Svensson (13 January 1942 – 12 October 2012) was a Swedish Social Democratic politician.

== Political career ==
Svensson served as Municipal Commissioner in Ljusdal Municipality from January 1992 to December 1998. He then represented the Gävleborg County constituency as a Member of the Riksdag from 1998 to 2006.

During his time in the Riksdag, he was a member of the Committee on Taxation (2002–2006), the Committee on European Union Affairs (2002–2004), and served as a deputy member of both the EU Committee and the Committee on Finance.

He became Chair of the Board of Region Gävleborg in February 2007 and Chair of the Board of Almi Invest N. Sweden AB in 2008. He also chaired the boards of Ljusdals Energi AB, Ljusdals Elnät AB, Ljusdals Vatten AB, Ljusdals Renhållning AB, and Ljusnet AB.

== Other roles ==
He was a board member (1998–2002) and vice chair (2002–2007) of The Premium Pension Authority ("Premiepensionsmyndigheten"), and served on the board of the Riksgälden from 1999 to 2007. From 1999 to 2004, he was a member of OSEK – the Public Access and Secrecy Committee.

== Personal life and legacy ==
Born in Ytterlännäs Parish, Västernorrland County, he died in Ljusdal‑Ramsjö Parish on 12 October 2012. He is buried at Ljusdal's southern cemetery.
