= Gunnel Jonäng =

Swedish politician (1921–2008)

Gunnel Jonäng (1921–2008) was a Swedish politician. She was a member of the Centre Party. Jonäng was a member of parliament's second chamber, 1969–1988, elected in Gävleborg County constituency. She was the Chair of the Center women in 1981–1986. During the 1990s Jonäng was President of the Swedish Pensioners' Association. She was married to Bernt-Olof Jonäng.
