= Patrik Lundqvist =

Swedish politician (born 1984)

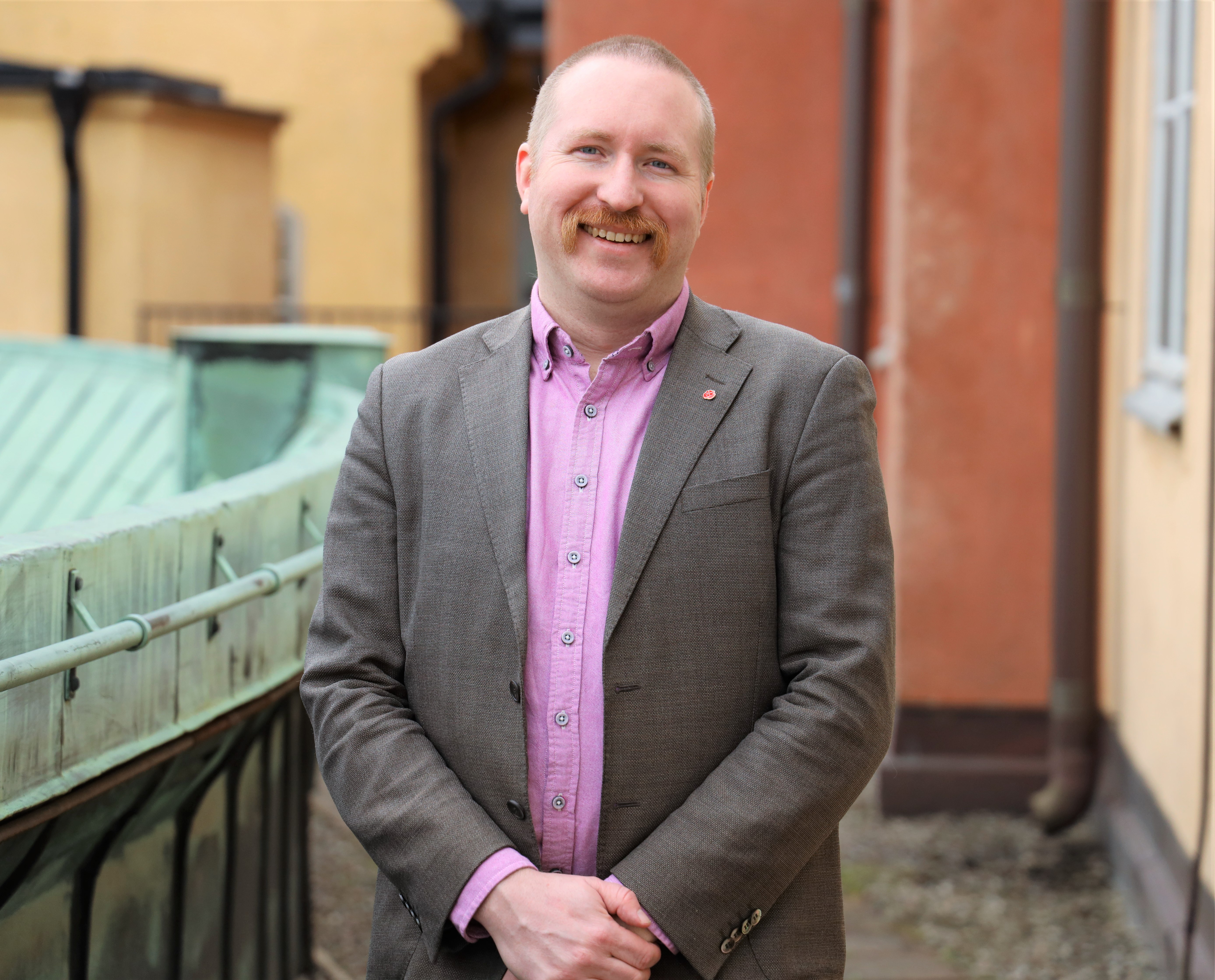
- Lundqvist in April 2021

Member of the Riksdag
- Incumbent
- Assumed office 29 September 2014
- Constituency: Gävleborg County

Personal details
- Born: Axel Patrik Lundqvist; 1984 (age 41–42)
- Party: Social Democratic Party

Axel Patrik Lundqvist (born 1984) is a Swedish politician and member of the Riksdag, the national legislature. A member of the Social Democratic Party, he has represented Gävleborg County since September 2014.

Lundqvist is the son of Per Lundqvist and personnel manager Lena Jernberg. He was educated in Sandviken. He has been a mechanic/crane inspector at Sandvik SMT since 2006. He has been a member of the municipal council in Sandviken Municipality since 2010.
