= Sinikka Bohlin =

Swedish politician (born 1947)

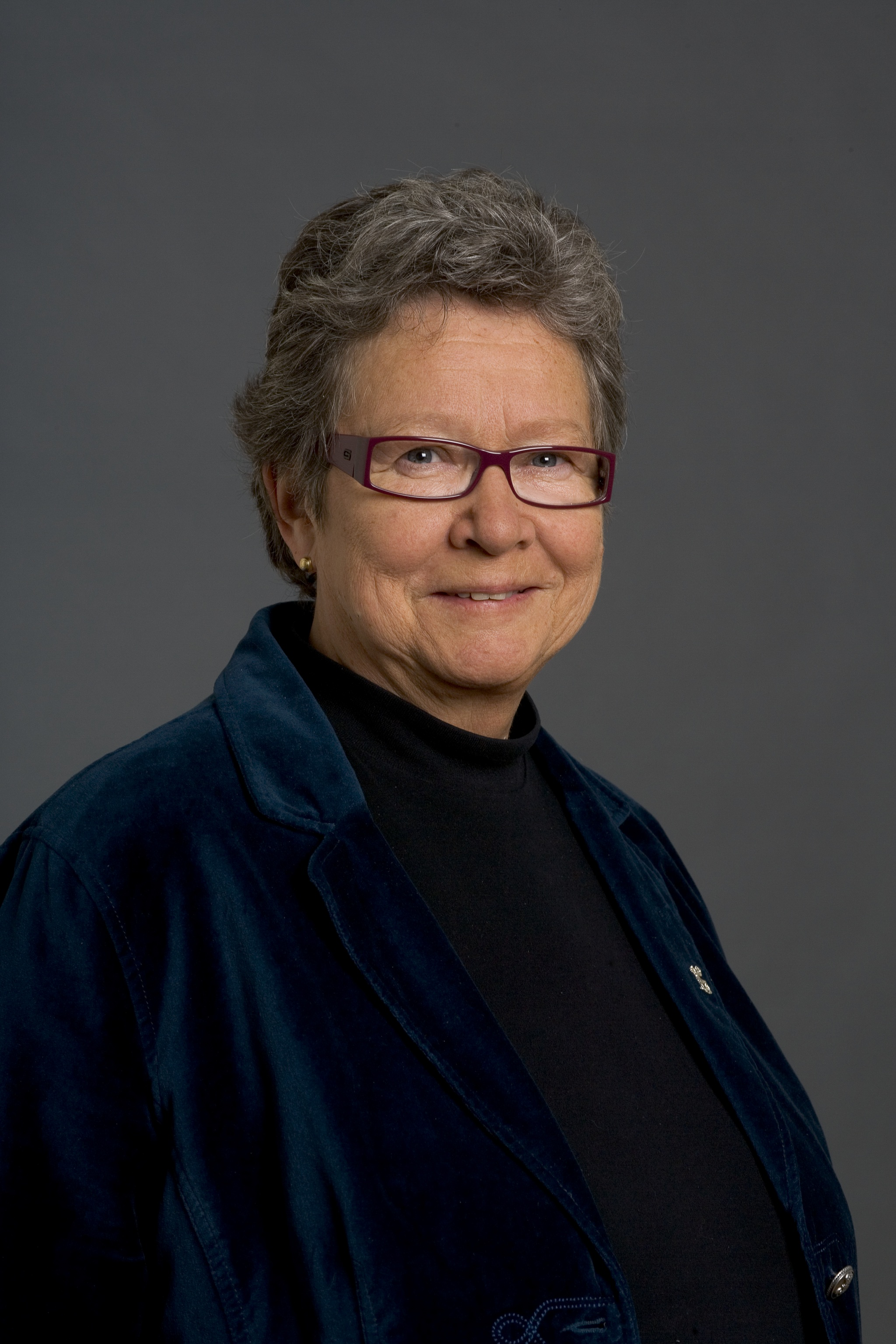
Sinikka Bohlin in 2007

Sinikka Bohlin (born 1947), is a Swedish Social Democratic politician who has been a member of the Riksdag in 1988–2010. She served as President of the Nordic Council in 2009.

Bohlin was born in Finland to a Finnish father and a Karelian-Belarusian mother, and moved to Sweden in 1968.
