= Margareta Kjellin =

Swedish politician (1948–2017)

Margareta Kjellin (3 September 1948 – 15 February 2017) was a Swedish politician of the Moderate Party. She was a member of the Riksdag for the Gävleborg County constituency from 2006 until her death on 15 February 2017. She was a nurse, had worked as a care teacher, and was the Moderate Party's spokesperson on elderly policy.
