= Owe Hellberg =

Swedish politician (born 1953)

Owe Hellberg (born 1953), is a Swedish Left Party politician, member of the Riksdag 1994–2006.
