= John Eriksson i Bäckmora =

Swedish politician

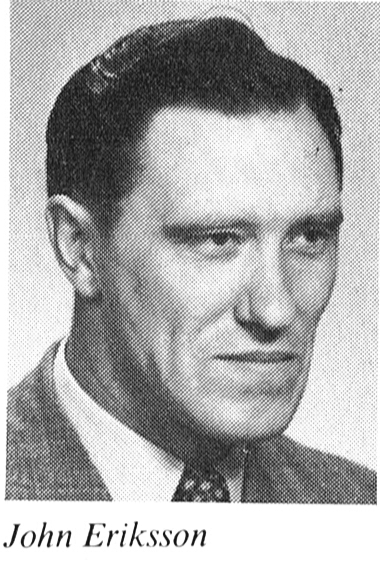

Member of the Riksdag
- In office 1957–1974

Personal details
- Born: 7 September 1915 Enånger, Sweden
- Died: 6 March 1974 (aged 58) Enånger, Sweden
- Party: Centre Party
- Occupation: farmer

John Eriksson (in the parliament known as John Eriksson i Bäckmora) (7 September 1915 – 6 March 1974) was a Swedish farmer and politician. He was a member of the Centre Party.

Eriksson was a Member of Parliament from 1957 to 1974 (until 1970 in the Lower House). He was elected in the Gävleborg County constituency. Because of his common last name, he was in parliament referred to as "Eriksson i Bäckmora" (Eriksson of Bäckmora)
