= Roger Hedlund (politician) =

Swedish politician (born 1979)

Member of the Riksdag
- Incumbent
- Assumed office 2014
- Constituency: Gävleborg County

Personal details
- Born: 6 November 1979 (age 46) Valbo
- Party: Sweden Democrats

Roger Karl Hedlund (born 6 November 1979) is a Swedish politician and member of the Riksdag for the Sweden Democrats party since 2014.

Hedlund grew up in Gävle and worked as an industrial engineer. He was a member of the city council in Gävle and has been the Sweden Democrats' district chairman in Gävleborg since 2003. He was elected to the Riksdag during the 2014 Swedish general election. Hedlund sits on the EU Committee in parliament and has campaigned against Swedish financial contributions to the EU in this role.
