= Bodil Valero =

Swedish politician

Bodil Valero MEP
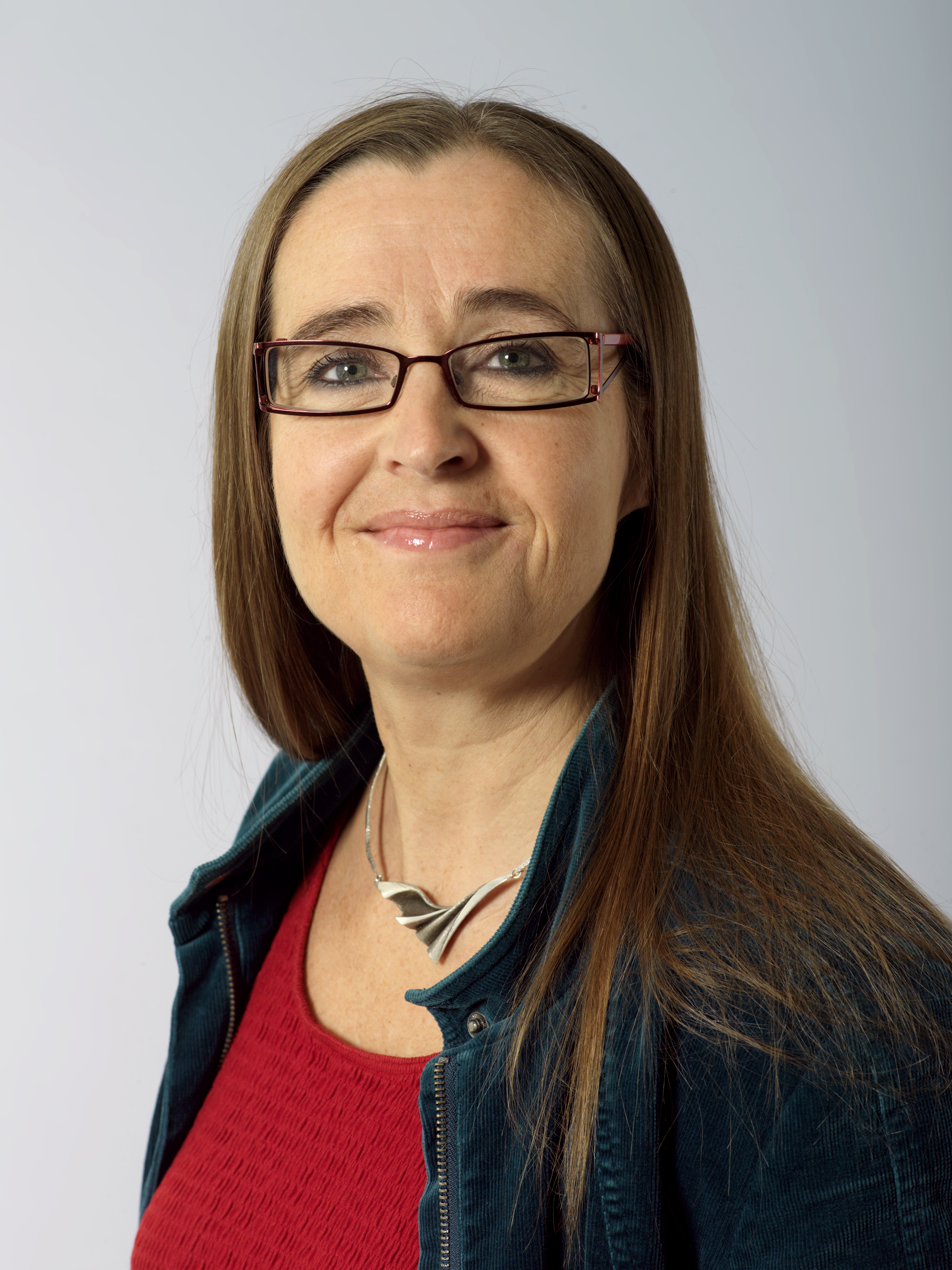

Co-Convener of the Global Greens
- Incumbent
- Assumed office 2023 Serving with Frank Habineza
- Preceded by: Bob Hale and Gloria Polanco

Member of the European Parliament
- In office 2014–2019
- Constituency: Sweden

Member of the Swedish Parliament
- In office 2006–2014
- Constituency: Gävleborg

Personal details
- Born: Bodil Lundström; 14 May 1958 (age 68) Jönköping, Sweden
- Party: Swedish; Green Party; EU; European Green Party
- Education: Uppsala University
- Website: Official website

Bodil Valero (born as Bodil Lundström, 14 May 1958, before June 2015 Bodil Ceballos) is a Swedish politician who served as a Member of the European Parliament (MEP) from 2014 until 2019. She is a member of the Green Party, part of the European Green Party. In parliament, Valero served as the green coordinator in the Security and Defence Committee (SEDE).

She also served as a member of the Committee on Civil Liberties, Justice and Home Affairs (LIBE) and the Delegation to the ACP-EU Joint Parliamentary Assembly (DACP) and as substitute in the Committee on Foreign Affairs (AFET), the Delegation for relations with the countries of Central America (DCAM) and the Delegation to the Euro-Latin American Parliamentary Assembly (DLAT)

In addition to her committee assignments, Valero served as vice-chairwoman of the European Parliament Intergroup on the Western Sahara.

== Profile issues ==
Valero works with the rights of refugees and migrants and for legal rights in the EU. She advocates an open and humane migration policy and has criticized the EU's Migration Policy Agreement with Turkey, in favor of Member States sharing responsibility for refugee reception.

Valero has been committed to minority rights, including Kurds, Assyrians / Syrians and Romans.

From 2014, she was the Green representative in the negotiations on the European Parliament's annual report on Turkey's accession negotiations.

As a reporter for the European Parliament's Annual Report on Arms Export.
