= Elin Lundgren =

Swedish politician (born 1978)

- Born: 1978 (age 47–48)
- Occupation: Politician
- Known for: Member of the Riksdag

Elin Lundgren (born 1978) is a Swedish Social Democratic Party politician.

She was elected member of the Riksdag for the period 2010–2022, from the Gävleborg County constituency.
