= Per Svedberg =

Swedish politician (born 1965)

Member of the Riksdag
- Incumbent
- Assumed office 2006
- Constituency: Gävleborg County

Personal details
- Born: 1965 (age 60–61)
- Party: Social Democrats
- Children: Five
- Occupation: junior-level teacher
- Website: Socialdemokraterna (Per Svedberg)

Per Svedberg (born 1965) is a Swedish social democratic politician, member of the Riksdag since the 2006 Swedish general election. He is as of 2007 living in the village of Norrbo in Gävleborg County with his partner Monica and their children. He enjoys rallying and "julefest".
