= Patrik Norinder =

Swedish politician (born 1941)

Patrik Norinder (born 1941) is a Swedish politician of the Moderate Party, member of the Riksdag 1991–2006.
