= Sven Bergström =

Swedish politician (born 1951)

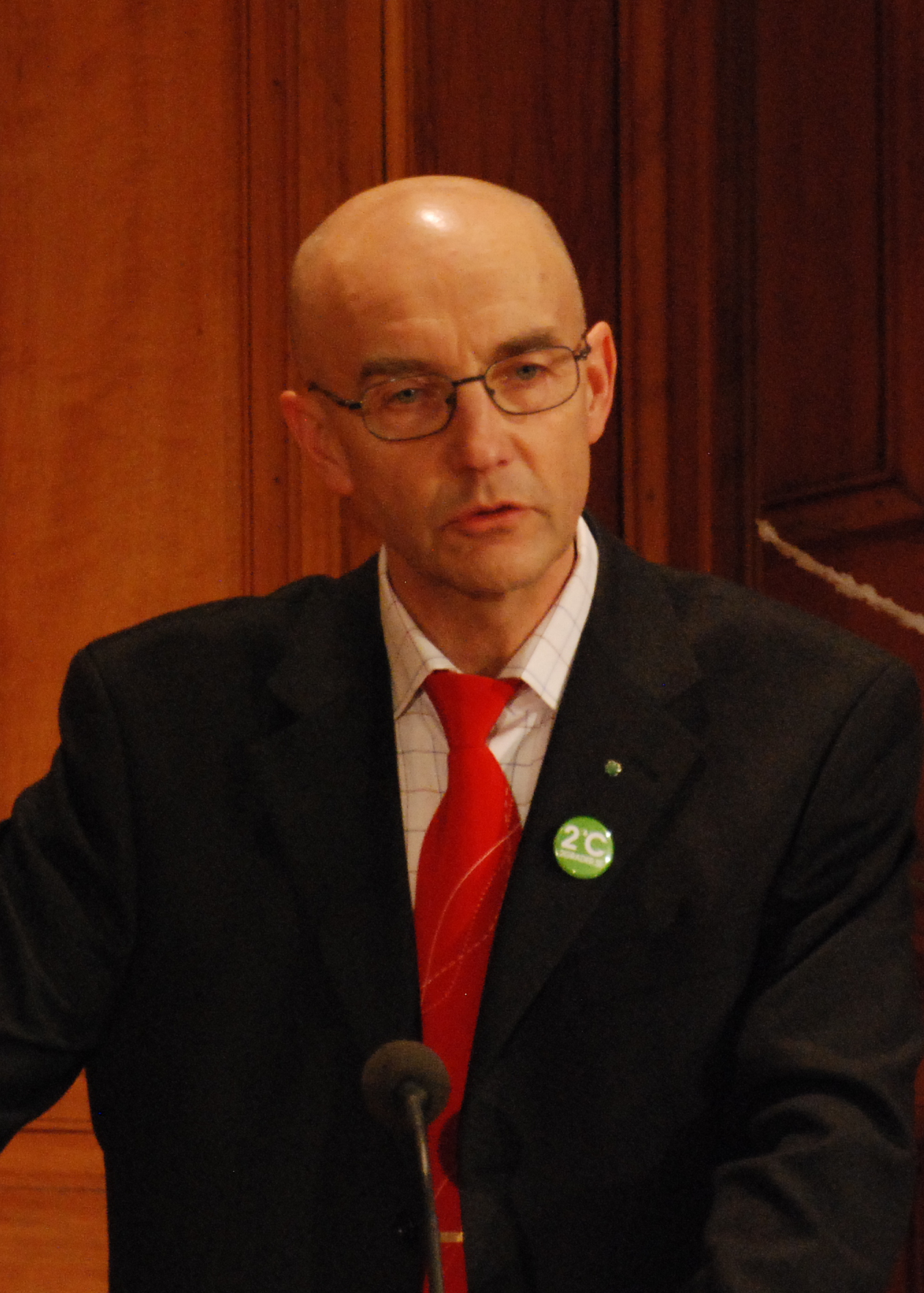
Sven Bergström

Sven Bergström (born 1951) is a Swedish Centre Party politician who served in the Riksdag from 1997 until 2010.
