= Bomhus =

Urban area in Gävle, Sweden

Coordinates: 60°41′N 17°13′E

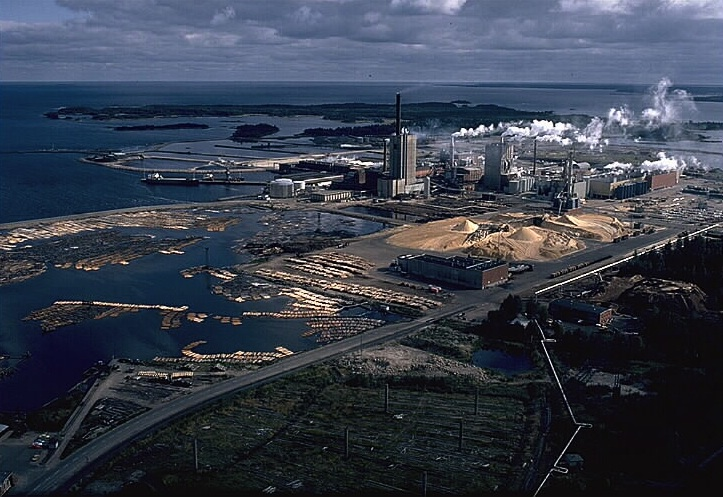
Billerud Korsnäs

Bomhus is a district of Gävle, Sweden. It began to grow as an urban area after the sawmill Korsnäs AB moved from Korsnäs, Falun to the coast near Gävle in 1899. Korsnäs AB became a pulp and paper manufacturer in 1910. In 2012 it fused with Billerud AB forming BillerudKorsnäs.

Bomhus is home to a football club called IK Huge.

Several Bronze Age cairns can be found in Bomhus, especially in the nature reserve area Signalberget.
