= Lars Beckman =

Swedish politician (born 1967)

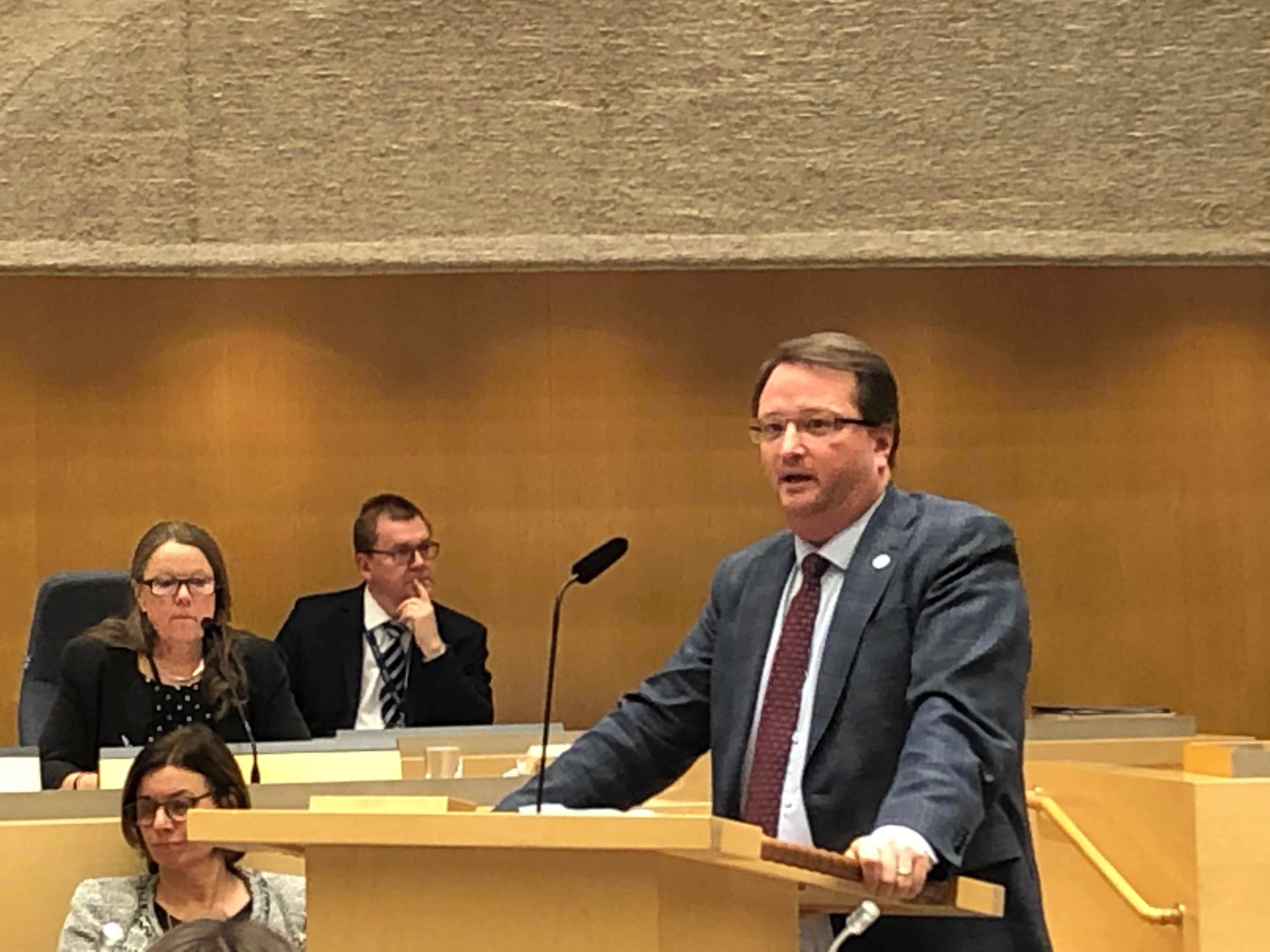
Lars Beckman in 2019

Lars Erik Peter Beckman (born 19 September 1967 in Överluleå parish, Norrbotten County) is a Swedish politician from the Moderate Party. He has served as a member of the Riksdag from 2010 to 2014 and again since 2017, elected for the Gävleborg County constituency.
