= Åsa Lindestam =

Swedish politician (born 1956)

Åsa Lindestam S
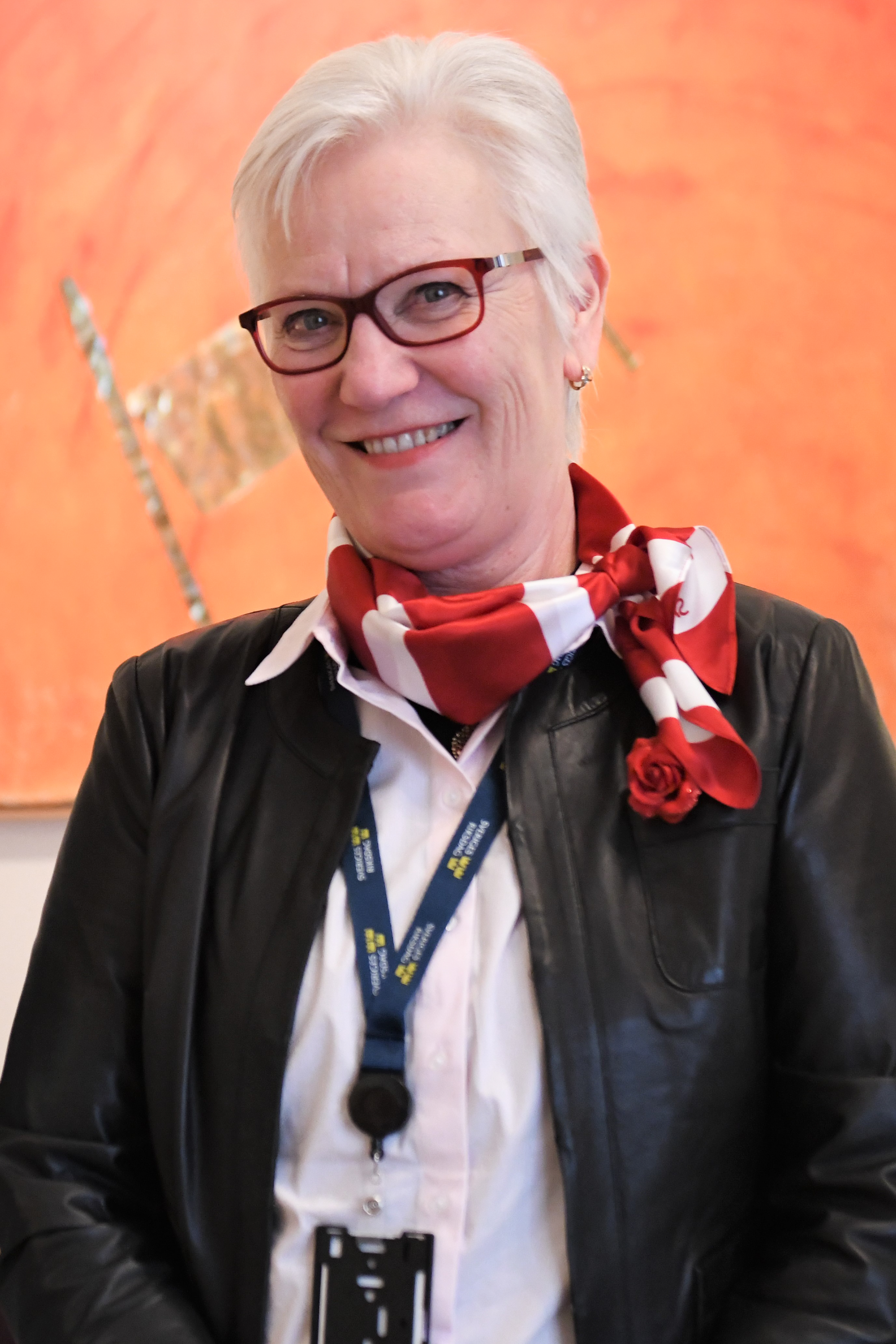

First Deputy Speaker of the Riksdag
- In office 24 September 2018 – 26 September 2022
- Monarch: Carl XVI Gustaf
- Preceded by: Ewa Thalén Finné
- Succeeded by: Kenneth G. Forslund

Member of the Riksdag
- In office 30 September 2002 – 26 September 2022
- Constituency: Gävleborg County

Personal details
- Born: 24 April 1956 (age 69) Sweden
- Party: Social Democratic

Åsa Lindestam (born 24 April 1956) is a Swedish social democratic politician. She was a member of the Riksdag from 2002 to 2022 and deputy speaker from 2018 to 2022. She is a member of the Committee on Defence and a Swedish member of the Organization for Security and Co-operation in Europe.
