= Ulla Andersson (politician) =

Swedish politician (born 1963)

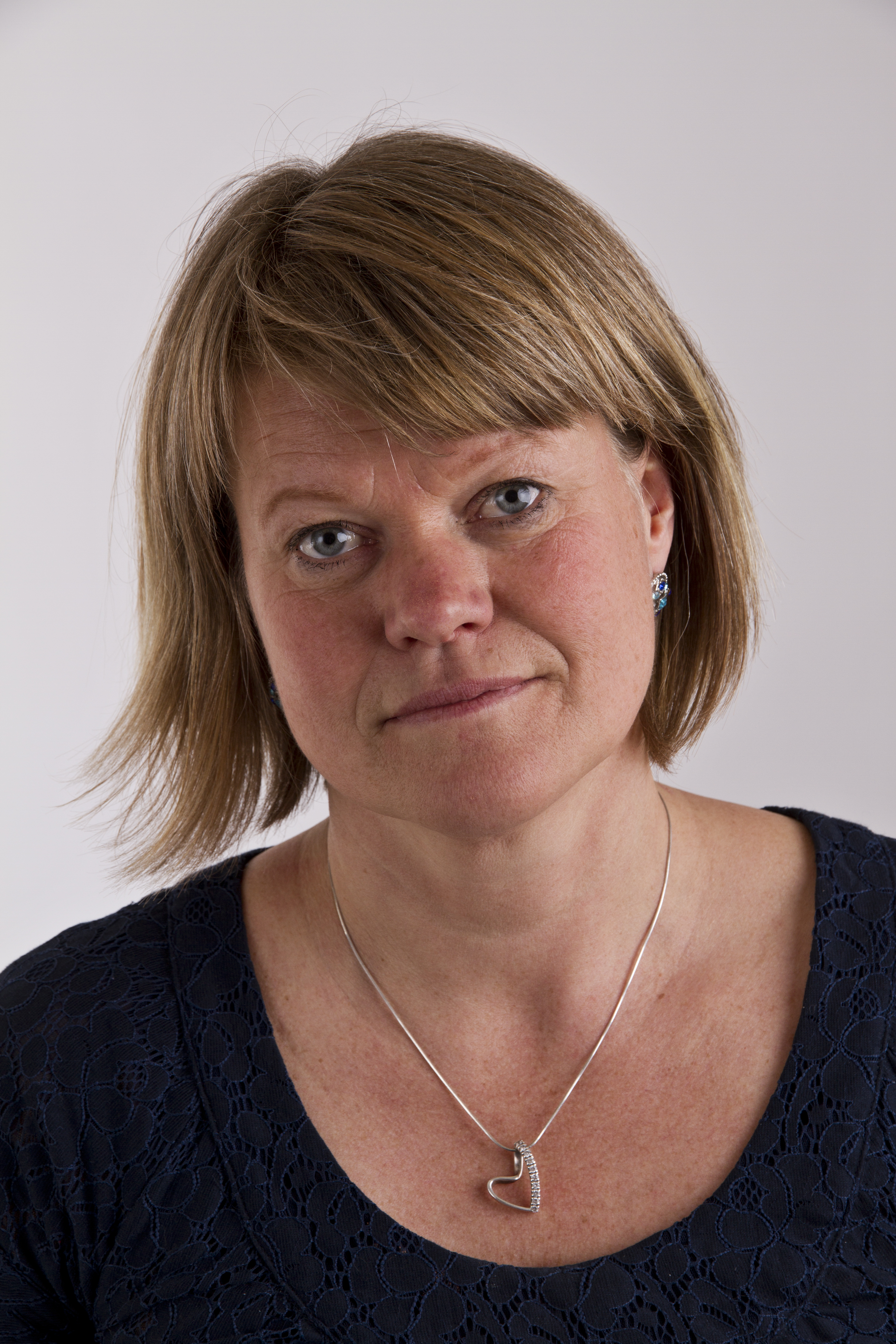

Personal details
- Born: 4 January 1963 (age 62)
- Party: Left Party (Sweden)

Ulla Andersson (born 1963) is a Swedish politician of the Left Party. She was a member of parliament from 2006 to 2022.
