= Hans Backman =

Swedish politician (born 1963)

Hans Backman (born 1963) is a Swedish Liberal People's Party politician, who was a member of the Riksdag from 2002 to 2014.
