= Raimo Pärssinen =

Swedish politician

Raimo Tapio Pärssinen (born 5 April 1956) is a Swedish Social Democratic politician, who has been a member of the Riksdag since 1998. He is of Finnish descent.
