= Kenneth G. Forslund =

Swedish politician (born 1967)

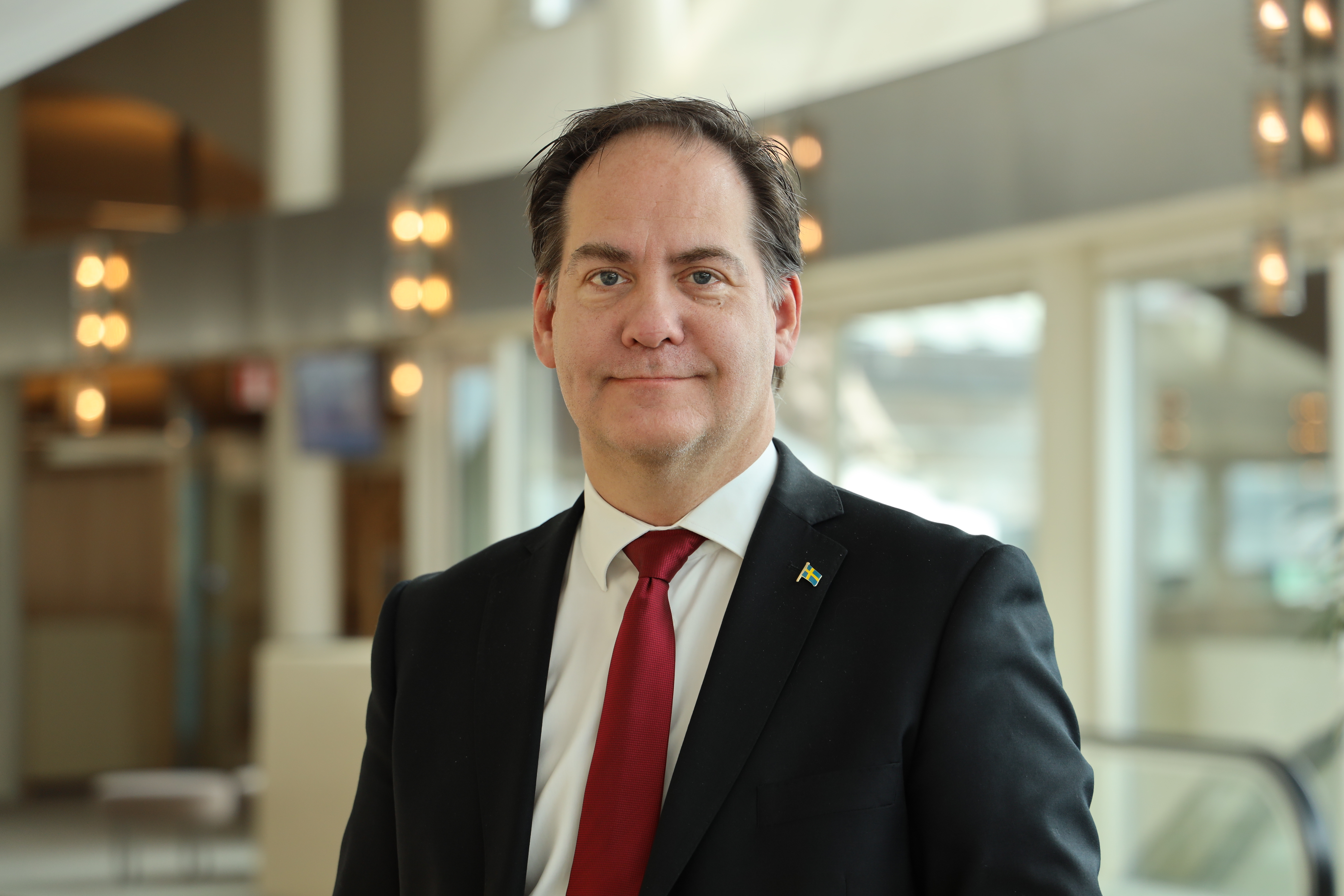

First Deputy Speaker of the Riksdag
- In office 26 September 2022 – 28 September 2026
- Speaker: Andreas Norlén
- Preceded by: Åsa Lindestam
- Succeeded by: Johanna Haraldsson

Member of the Riksdag
- In office 30 September 2002 – 28 September 2026
- Constituency: Västra Götaland County West

Personal details
- Born: Kenneth Gustaf Forslund; 14 May 1967 (age 59) Kungälv, Sweden
- Party: Social Democrats

Kenneth Gustaf Forslund (14 May 1967) is a Swedish politician who served in the Riksdag for Västra Götaland County West as a member of the Swedish Social Democratic Party (SAP) from 2002 to 2026, and was First Deputy Speaker of the Riksdag from 2022 to 2026. A member of the SAP since 1980, Forslund was chair of the party and its youth league in Kungälv and Bohuslän.

== Early life ==
Kenneth Gustaf Forslund was born in Kungälv, Sweden, on 14 May 1967.

== Career ==
Forslund is a member of the Swedish Social Democratic Party (SAP) and joined the party's youth league in 1980. He chaired the SAP in Bohuslän from 2007 to 2017. He was chair of the SAP's youth league in Bohuslän and Kungälv from 2009 to 2017. He was a member of Kungälv's municipal council.

In the 2002 election Forslund was elected to the Riksdag for Västra Götaland County West. In 2022, he was selected as First Deputy Speaker of the Riksdag. During his tenure in the Riksdag he has served as chair of the Foreign Affairs committee from 2014 to 2022, Deputy member of the EU Affairs committee from 2011 to 2012, and since 2022, and Deputy member of the Defence committee since 2022. He was the SAP's spokesman on development aid policy from 2011 to 2014.

Forslund is a member of the Olof Palme International Center's board.

== Personal life ==
Forslund is the father of three children.

== Political positions ==
Forslund was opposed to the reparation of 33 people to Turkey in order for Turkey to drop its opposition to Sweden's admission to NATO. He worked for the yes campaign during the referendum to join the European Union in 1994.

== Works cited ==
=== News ===
- Sjogren, Anna; Dawod, Nivette (26 September 2022). "Andreas Norlén (M) återvald till riksdagens talman". Aftonbladet. Archived from the original on 22 June 2025.
- Spicer, Jonathan; Pamuk, Humeyra; Emmott, Robin (18 May 2022). "How Turkey spoiled NATO's historic moment with Finland, Sweden". Reuters.

=== Web ===
- "CV". Kenneth G. Forslund. Archived from the original on 22 June 2025.
- "CV Curriculum Vitae" (PDF). Riksdag. Archived (PDF) from the original on 4 August 2024.

Political offices
Preceded by Sofia Arkelsten	Chairman of the Foreign Affairs Committee; 2014–2018	Succeeded by Hans Wallmark
Preceded by Hans Wallmark	Chairman of the Foreign Affairs Committee; 2019–2022	Succeeded by Aron Emilsson
Preceded by Åsa Lindestam	First Deputy Speaker of the Riksdag; 2022–2026	Succeeded by Johanna Haraldsson
