= Jan Ertsborn =

Swedish politician (born 1944)

Jan Ertsbon
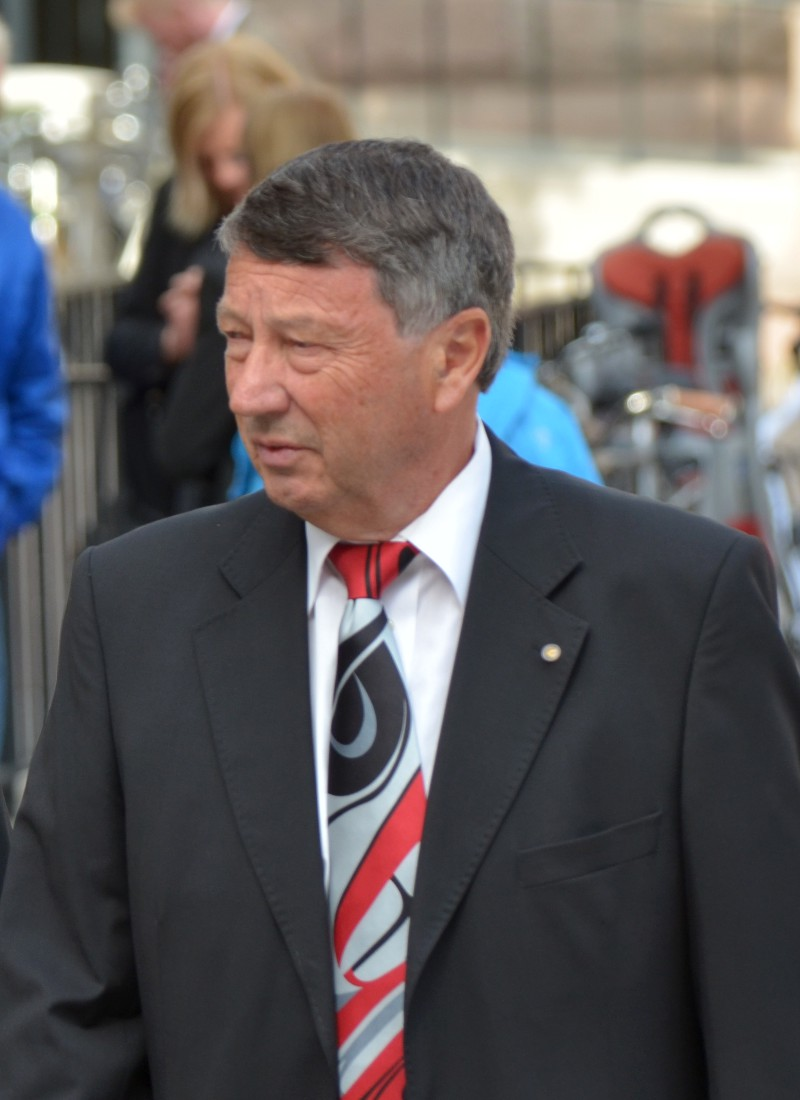

Third Deputy Speaker of the Riksdag
- In office 2012–2014
- Preceded by: Liselott Hagberg
- Succeeded by: Esabelle Dingizian

Member of the Riksdag
- Incumbent
- Assumed office 2002

Personal details
- Born: 1944 (age 81–82)
- Party: Liberal People's Party

Jan Ertsborn (born 1944) is a Swedish Liberal People's Party politician. He has been a member of the Riksdag since 2002.

In October 2007, Jan Ertsborn called for the Swedish government to make bestiality illegal in the country, believing the cause for it to be legal to be unjustified. From 2012 to 2014 he was the Third Deputy Speaker of the Riksdag. He was succeeded by Esabelle Dingizian.
