= List of deputy speakers of the Riksdag =

The speaker of the Riksdag is assisted by three deputy speakers who are also elected by a vote in the chamber.

Traditionally, the second, third and fourth largest parties gets to name one of their members for these offices. There is some disagreement whether the largest party or the leader of the largest party bloc should hold the Speakership. Unlike the Speaker (and cabinet ministers), the deputy speakers are not replaced by an alternate and remain members of the Riksdag with voting rights.

== List of deputy speakers ==
This is a list of deputy speakers of the Riksdag, since it became a unicameral body 1971.

=== First deputy speaker ===
Name	Term	Political Party
Torsten Bengtson	1971–1979	Centre Party
Ingegerd Troedsson	1979–1991	Moderate Party
Stig Alemyr	1991–1994	Social Democrats
Anders Björck	1994–2003	Moderate Party
Per Westerberg	2003–2006	Moderate Party
Jan Björkman	2006–2010	Social Democrats
Susanne Eberstein	2010–2014	Social Democrats
Tobias Billström	2014–2017	Moderate Party
Ewa Thalén Finné	2017–2018	Moderate Party
Åsa Lindestam	2018–2022	Social Democrats
Kenneth G. Forslund	2022–2026	Social Democrats
Johanna Haraldsson	2026–	Social Democrats

=== Second deputy speaker ===
Name	Term	Political Party
Cecilia Nettelbrandt	1971–1973	People's Party
Ivar Virgin	1973–1976	Moderate Party
Tage Magnusson	1976–1979	Moderate Party
Thorsten Larsson	1979–1982	Centre Party
Anders Dahlgren	1982–1985	Centre Party
Karl Erik Eriksson	1985–1988	People's Party
Christer Eirefelt	1988–1994	People's Party
Görel Thurdin	1994–1998	Centre Party
Eva Zetterberg	1998–2002	Left Party
Kerstin Heinemann	2002–2006	Liberal People's Party
Birgitta Sellén	2006–2010	Centre Party
Ulf Holm	2010–2014	Green Party
Björn Söder	2014–2018	Sweden Democrats
Lotta Johnsson Fornarve	2018–2022	Left Party
Julia Kronlid	2022–	Sweden Democrats

=== Third deputy speaker ===
Name	Term	Political Party
Ivar Virgin	1971–1973	Moderate Party
Cecilia Nettelbrandt	1973–1976	People's Party
Karl Erik Eriksson	1976–1985	People's Party
Anders Dahlgren	1985–1986	Centre Party
Bertil Fiskesjö	1986–1994	Centre Party
Christer Eirefelt	1994–1998	People's Party
Rose-Marie Frebran	1998–2002	Christian Democrats
Helena Höij	2002–2006	Christian Democrats
Liselott Hagberg	2006–2012	Liberal People's Party
Jan Ertsborn	2012–2014	Liberal People's Party
Esabelle Dingizian	2014–2018	Green Party
Kerstin Lundgren	2018–	Centre Party
