= Julia Kronlid =

Swedish politician (born 1980)

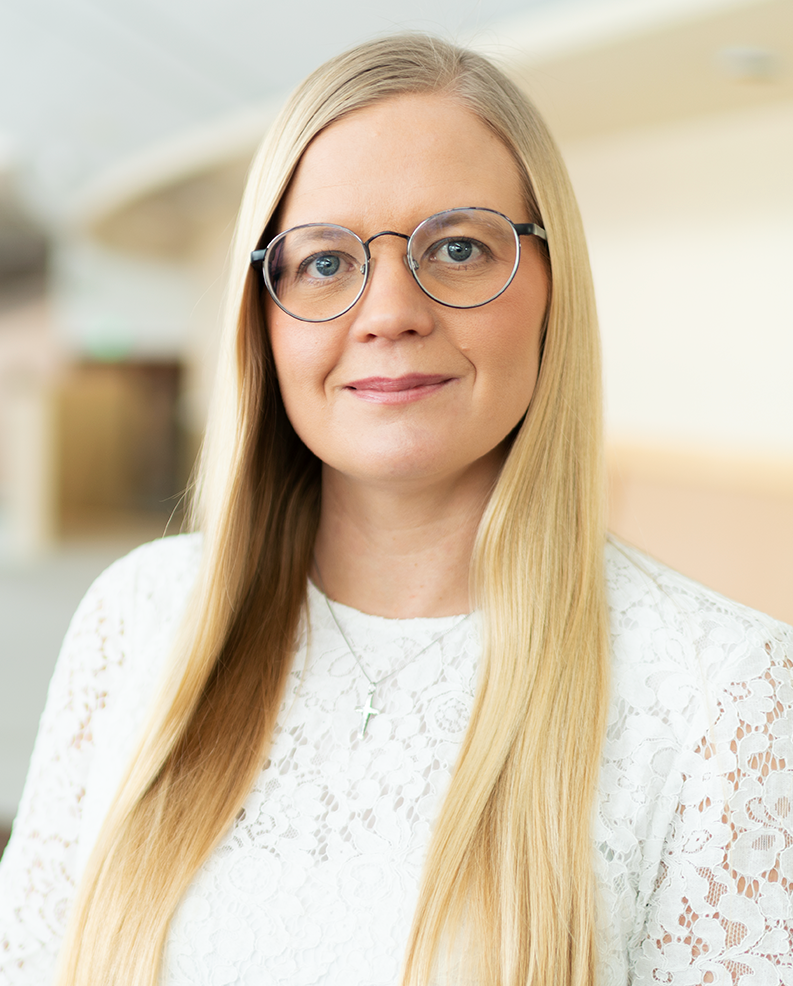
- Julia Kronlid in 2022

Second Deputy Speaker of the Riksdag
- Incumbent
- Assumed office 26 September 2022
- Speaker: Andreas Norlén
- Preceded by: Lotta Johnsson Fornarve

Member of the Riksdag
- Incumbent
- Assumed office 19 October 2010
- Constituency: Stockholm County (2014– ) Skåne County (2010–2014)

Personal details
- Born: 16 July 1980 (age 46)
- Party: Sweden Democrats

Julia Maria Kronlid (born 16 July 1980) is a Swedish politician and the second deputy of the Sweden Democrats. A member of the Riksdagen since the 2010 general election, she represents the Stockholm County electorate.

== Biography ==
=== Early life and career ===
Kronlid is the daughter of toolmaker and seamstress. She grew up in Myresjö where her family were free church members.

She completed a degree in nursing followed by a degree in social care and pedagogical treatment at Örebro University. After graduating she worked for the general psychiatry department at Örebro County Council and as a volunteer nurse for the Pingstmission – a Pentecostal Evangelical development work at a hospital clinic in Papua New Guinea.

=== Political career ===
Kronlid joined the Sweden Democrats in 2006 after previously supporting the Christian Democrats. In the 2010 Swedish general election, she was elected to the Riksdag as a member of the party.

From 12 October 2010, Kronlid took maternity leave and was replaced temporarily by Stellan Bojerud. She returned to the Riksdagen on 18 April 2011. Since 2013, she has been a chairman of the Sweden Democrats party board.

Kronlid currently sits on the Riksdagen Committee on Foreign Affairs specializing in foreign politics and humanitarian assistance politics for other countries. She said during the Sweden Democrats annual party congress in 2009 that she thought her party should help refugees in the area of the crisis.

In 2015, she proposed a motion in the Riksdag to lower the abortion limit in Sweden from 18 weeks to 12 weeks.

After the 2022 Swedish general election, she was named Second Deputy Speaker of the Riksdag.

== Views ==
In an article in Svenska Dagbladet in December 2015, Kronlid criticized that 30% of Swedish foreign aid was used to finance immigration into Sweden. She stated that after she had been visiting refugee camps in both Jordan and Lebanon, she thought it was obvious that more aid was needed to the immediate area of the crisis and not for immigration costs for Sweden.

Kronlid has a strong Christian faith and believes that human evolution should not be the only theory taught to children in schools. She has further stated that she rejects the scientific consensus that humans and apes evolved from a common ancestor, and that she doesn't know if the Earth is older than 6000 years.

== Personal life ==
She resides in Glanshammar and is married to local politician David Kronlid; the couple has two children together: a daughter and a son.

Party political offices
Preceded by Jonas Åkerlund	First Deputy Leader of the Sweden Democrats; 2015–2019	Succeeded by Henrik Vinge
Preceded by Carina Ståhl Herrstedt	Second Deputy Leader of the Sweden Democrats; 2019–	Incumbent
Political offices
Preceded by Lotta Johnsson Fornarve	Second Deputy Speaker of the Riksdag; 2022–present	Incumbent
