= Leif Cassel =

Swedish politician (1906–1988)

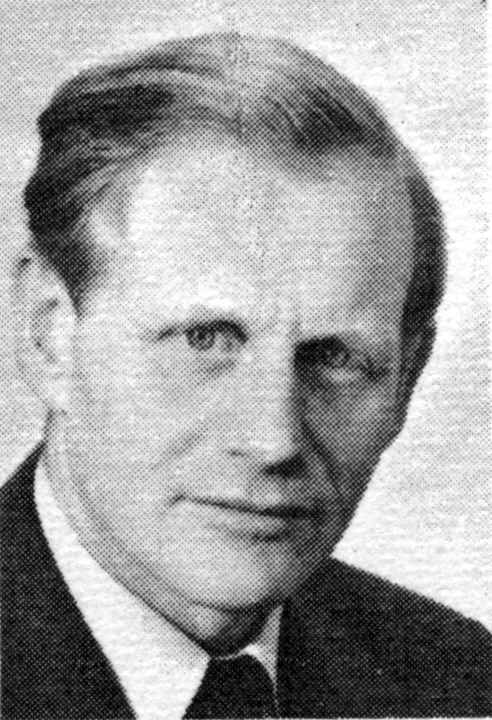
Cassel in 1960

Leif Delling Cassel (8 December 1906 – 24 December 1988) was a Swedish politician and lawyer. He served as a Member of Parliament from 1950 to 1970, first as a member of the upper house from 1950 to 1952 and then as a member of the lower house from 1953 to 1970. He was Second Vice President of the lower house from 1965 to 1970. He was President of the Nordic Council in 1969. Cassel was also Vice President of the Moderate Party from 1956 to 1965.
