= Esabelle Dingizian =

Swedish Green Party politician

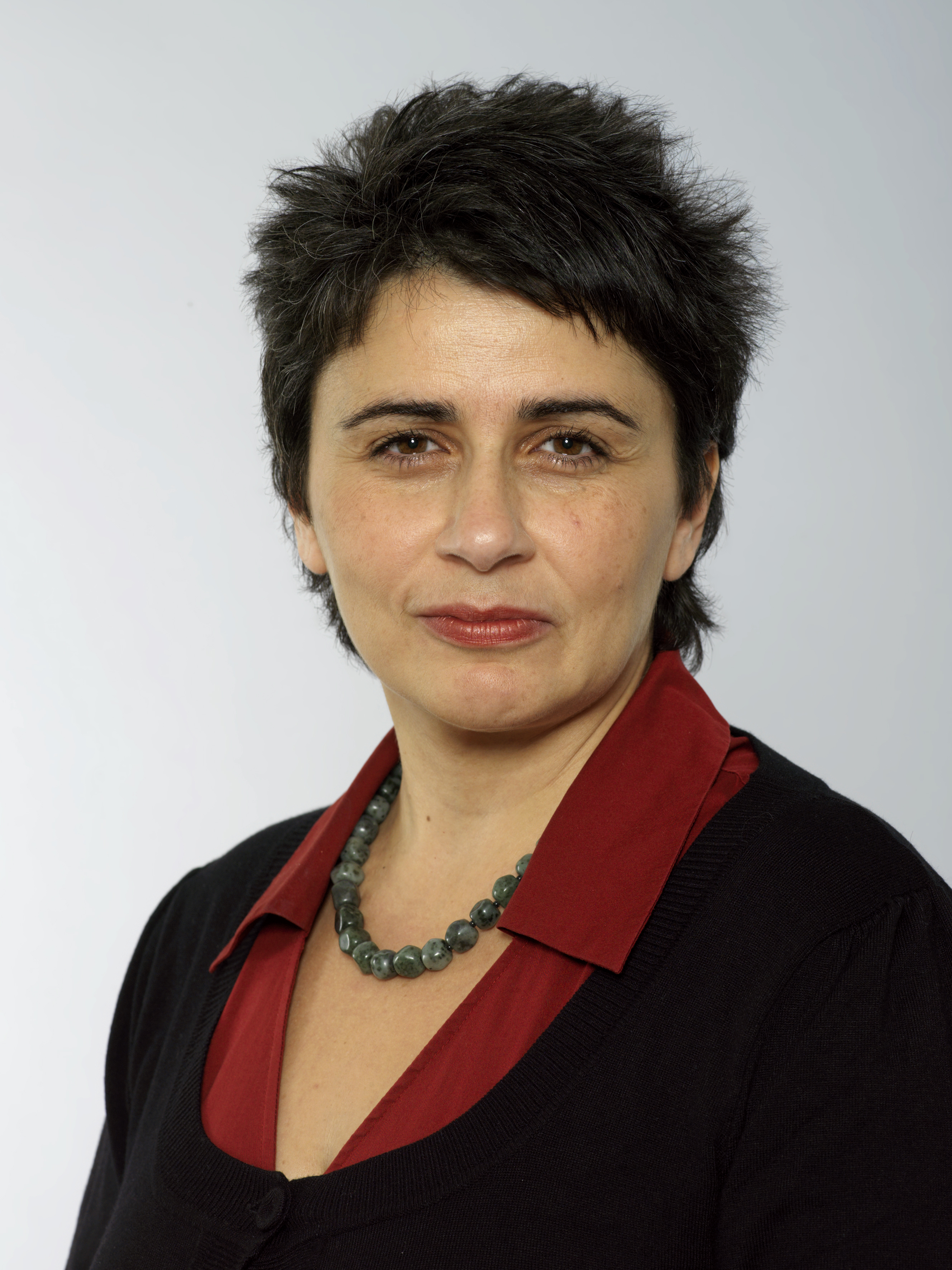

Third Deputy Speaker of the Riksdag
- In office 29 September 2014 – 24 September 2018
- Monarch: Carl XVI Gustaf
- Preceded by: Jan Ertsborn
- Succeeded by: Kerstin Lundgren

Personal details
- Born: 16 September 1962 (age 62); Baghdad, Iraq
- Political party: Green Party
- Website: mp.se/esabelle

Esabelle Dingizian (Armenian: Իզապէլ Տինկիզեան; born 16 September 1962) is a Swedish Green Party politician. She has been a member of the Riksdag since 2006. She served as Third Deputy Speaker of the Riksdag from 2014 to 2018.

== Early life ==
Dingizian was born in Baghdad, Iraq to Armenian parents on 16 September 1962. Her grandmother was a survivor of the Armenian genocide and eventually moved to Iraq. Her family moved to Sweden in 1965 due to her father's career. She grew up in Malmö.

== Political career ==
Esabelle Dingizian entered politics in the late 1990s. In 1998 she was elected a member of the Botkyrka Municipality council. She became a member of the Riksdag in 2006 as the representative of the Stockholm County Council constituency. Dingizian became a member of the Committee on Cultural Affairs. She also worked with the Committee on the Labour Market and the Committee on Education. In 2014, Dingizian was elected the Third Deputy Speaker of the Swedish Parliament.

== Personal life ==
Besides Swedish, she speaks Armenian and Arabic. Till March 2008 she was known as Esabelle Reshdouni.
