= Tomas Tobé =

Swedish politician (born 1978)

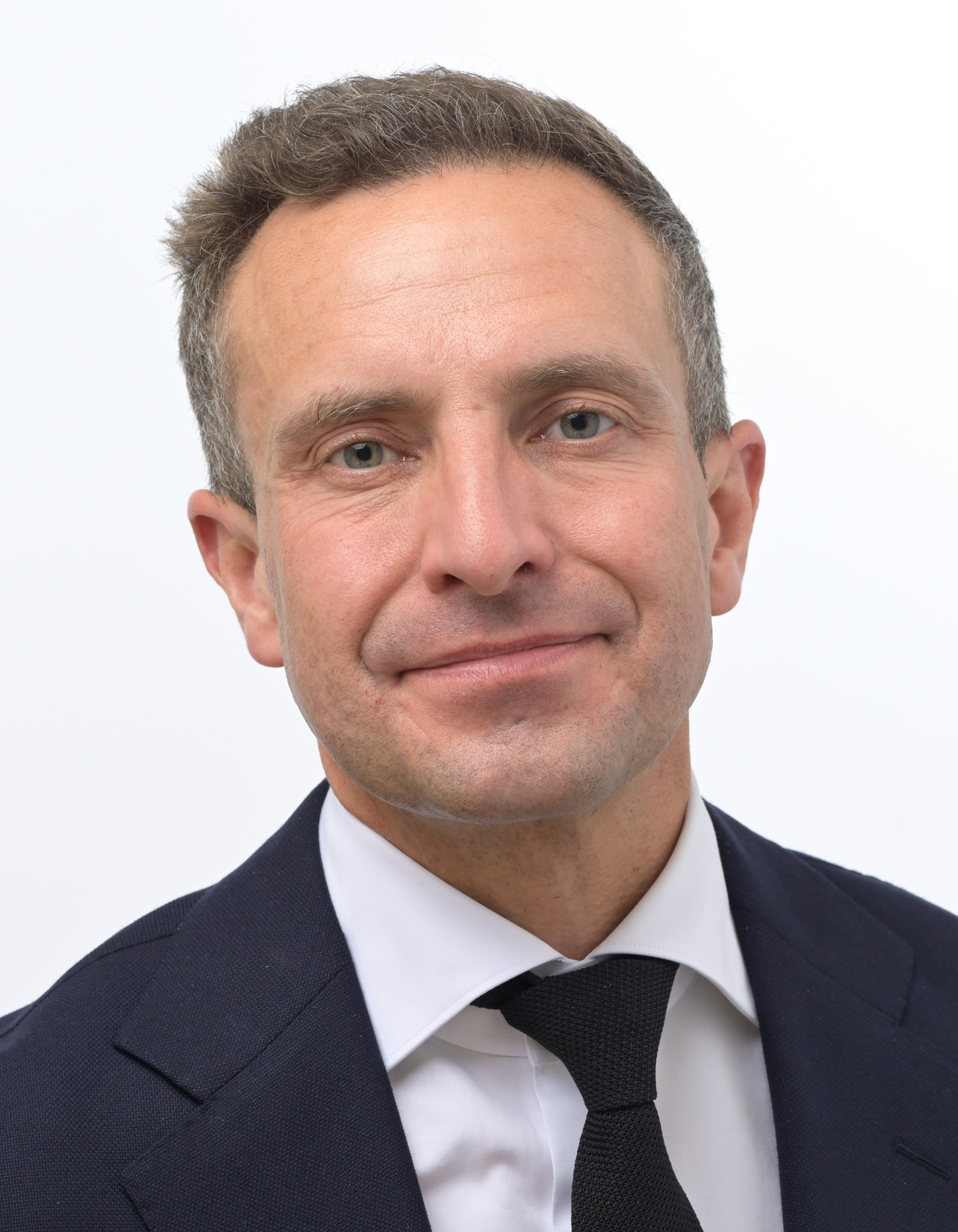
- Official portrait, 2024

Vice-Chair of the European People's Party in the European Parliament
- Incumbent
- Assumed office 19 June 2024
- Chair: Manfred Weber
- Serving alongside: François-Xavier Bellamy; Andrzej Halicki; Jeroen Lenaers; Dolors Montserrat; Siegfried Mureșan; Lídia Pereira; Massimiliano Salini; Romana Tomc; Željana Zovko
- Preceded by: See list: Arnaud Danjean; Frances Fitzgerald; Rasa Juknevičienė; Jeroen Lenaers; Vangelis Meimarakis; Dolors Montserrat; Siegfried Mureşan; Jan Olbrycht; Željana Zovko; Lídia Pereira

Member of the European Parliament
- Incumbent
- Assumed office 2 July 2019
- Constituency: Sweden

Secretary-General of the Moderate Party
- In office 10 January 2015 – 2 June 2017
- Party chairman: Anna Kinberg Batra
- Preceded by: Kent Persson
- Succeeded by: Anders Edholm

Member of the Riksdag
- In office 24 September 2018 – 1 July 2019
- Constituency: Stockholm County
- In office 2 October 2006 – 24 September 2018
- Constituency: Gävleborg County

Personal details
- Born: 16 February 1978 (age 48) Gävle, Sweden
- Party: Moderate
- Spouse: Markus Tobé
- Children: 2
- Occupation: Businessman, politician

Tomas Gunnar Tobé (born 16 February 1978) is a Swedish politician who has served as a Member of the European Parliament since the 2019 European Parliament election in Sweden.

In the European Parliament, Tobé is a Vice-Chair of the European People's Party since 2024 and Chair of the Parliament's Committee on Development since 2019. He was Secretary-General of the Moderate Party from 2015 to 2017.

== Political career ==
=== Career in national politics ===
Tobé was elected to the Swedish Riksdag in the 2006 general election. During his parliament, he served as chair of its Committee on Employment from 2010 to 2012; the Committee on Education from 2012 to 2014; and the Committee on Legal Affairs from 2018 to 2019. He was mentioned as possible successor for the party leadership after Fredrik Reinfeldt, but declined and supported Anna Kinberg Batra.

In March 2017 there was controversy around Tobé after it was revealed that he had used public funds for wine purchases and personal trips. On 2 June 2017, he was removed from his position as Secretary-General by party leader Anna Kinberg Batra and appointed Shadow Minister for Justice and Chairman of the Parliament's Committee on Justice.

=== Member of the European Parliament ===
Since the 2019 European Parliament election, Tobé has been serving as chairman of the Committee on Development. In this capacity, he co-chairs (alongside David McAllister) the Democracy Support and Election Coordination Group (DEG), which oversees the Parliament’s election observation missions.

Tobé is also a member of the Committee on Civil Liberties, Justice and Home Affairs. On the committee, he has been serving as rapporteur on asylum and migration since 2020.

In addition to his committee assignments, Tobé is part of the Parliament’s delegations for relations to Israel and to the Parliamentary Assembly of the Union for the Mediterranean. He also belongs to the European Parliament Intergroup on LGBT Rights and the European Parliament Intergroup on Children’s Rights.

After the 2022 Russian invasion of Ukraine, Tobé supported Swedish membership in NATO.

In March 2024, Tobé was one of twenty MEPs to be given a "Rising Star" award at The Parliament Magazine's annual MEP Awards

He was re-elected in the 2024 European Parliament election in Sweden.

== Personal life ==
Tobé is married to Markus Tobé with whom he has twins born via surrogacy.

Political offices
Preceded by Linda McAvan	Chair of the European Parliament's; Committee on Development; 2019–2024	Succeeded by Barry Andrews
Party political offices
Preceded by Kent Persson	Secretary-General of the Moderate Party; 2015–2017	Succeeded by Anders Edholm
Preceded by See list: Arnaud Danjean; Frances Fitzgerald; Rasa Juknevičienė; Jeroen Lenaers; Vangelis Meimarakis; Dolors Montserrat; Siegfried Mureşan; Jan Olbrycht; Željana Zovko; Lídia Pereira	Vice-Chair of the European People's Party in the European Parliament; 2024–	Incumbent
