= Per Schlingmann =

Swedish politician (born 1970)

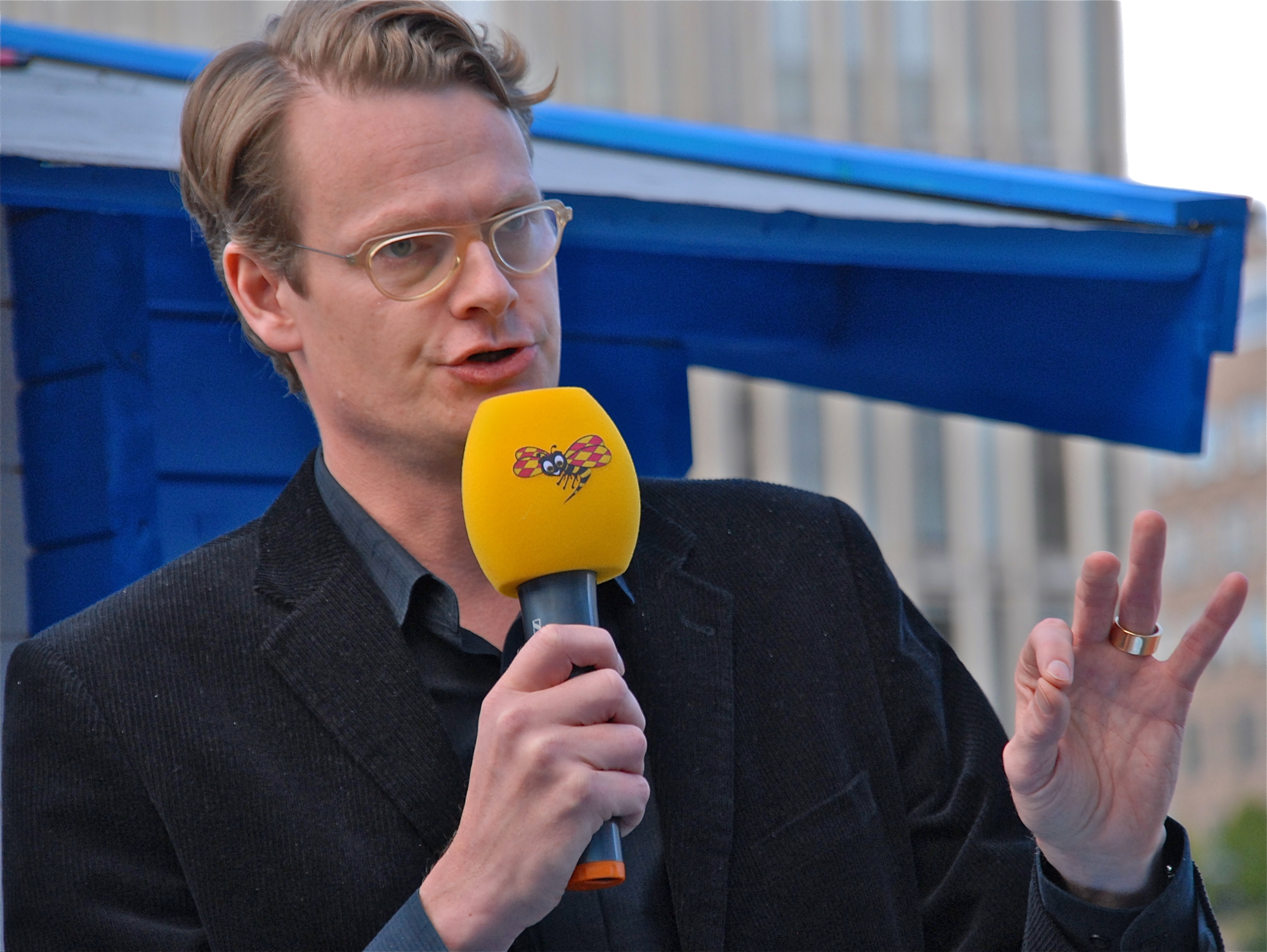
- Per Schlingmann in 2010

State Secretary at the Prime Minister's Office
- In office 11 October 2010 – 24 May 2012
- Prime Minister: Fredrik Reinfeldt

Party secretary of the Moderate Party
- In office 26 September 2006 – 1 October 2010
- Party leader: Fredrik Reinfeldt
- Preceded by: Sven Otto Littorin
- Succeeded by: Sofia Arkelsten

Personal details
- Born: 16 October 1970 (age 55) Borås, Sweden
- Party: Moderate Party
- Occupation: Politician

Per Schlingmann (Swedish pronunciation: [ˈpæːr ˈʂlɪ̌ŋːman]; born 16 October 1970 in Borås) was the party secretary of the Swedish Moderate Party between 28 September 2006 and 1 October 2010 (succeeding Sven Otto Littorin), and a prominent figure in its political reorientation following the 2002 election defeat and leading to its 2006 election success.

From 11 October 2010 to 24 May 2012, Sclingmann served as State Secretary for Communications to the Prime Minister.

Party political offices
Preceded by Sven-Otto Littorin	Party secretary of the Moderate Party; 2006–2010	Succeeded by Sofia Arkelsten
Preceded by Established	State Secretary of the Prime Minister for Communications; 2010-2012	Succeeded by Abolished
