= Anders Dahlgren =

Swedish politician (1925–1986)

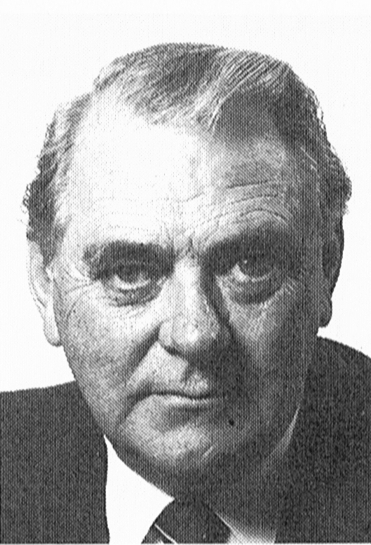
image of Anders Dahlgren

Anders Dahlgren (23 December 1925 – 24 March 1986) was a Swedish politician. He was a member of the Centre Party. He served at the Riksdag (lower chamber) 1961–1970, and of the unicameral Riksdag 1970 to his death in 1986. From 1982 to 1985 he was the Second Deputy Speaker of the Riksdag, and from 1985 to 1986 the Third Deputy Speaker.

He was minister for agriculture in the Government of Sweden from 8 October 1976, to 18 October 1978, and from 12 October 1979 to 8 October 1982. He was also acting minister for defence between 5 May 1981 and 22 May 1981.

Dahlberg was one of the board members of the Knut and Alice Wallenberg Foundation between 1983 and 1986.
