= Lotta Johnsson Fornarve =

Swedish politician for the Left Party

Lotta Johnsson Fornarve V
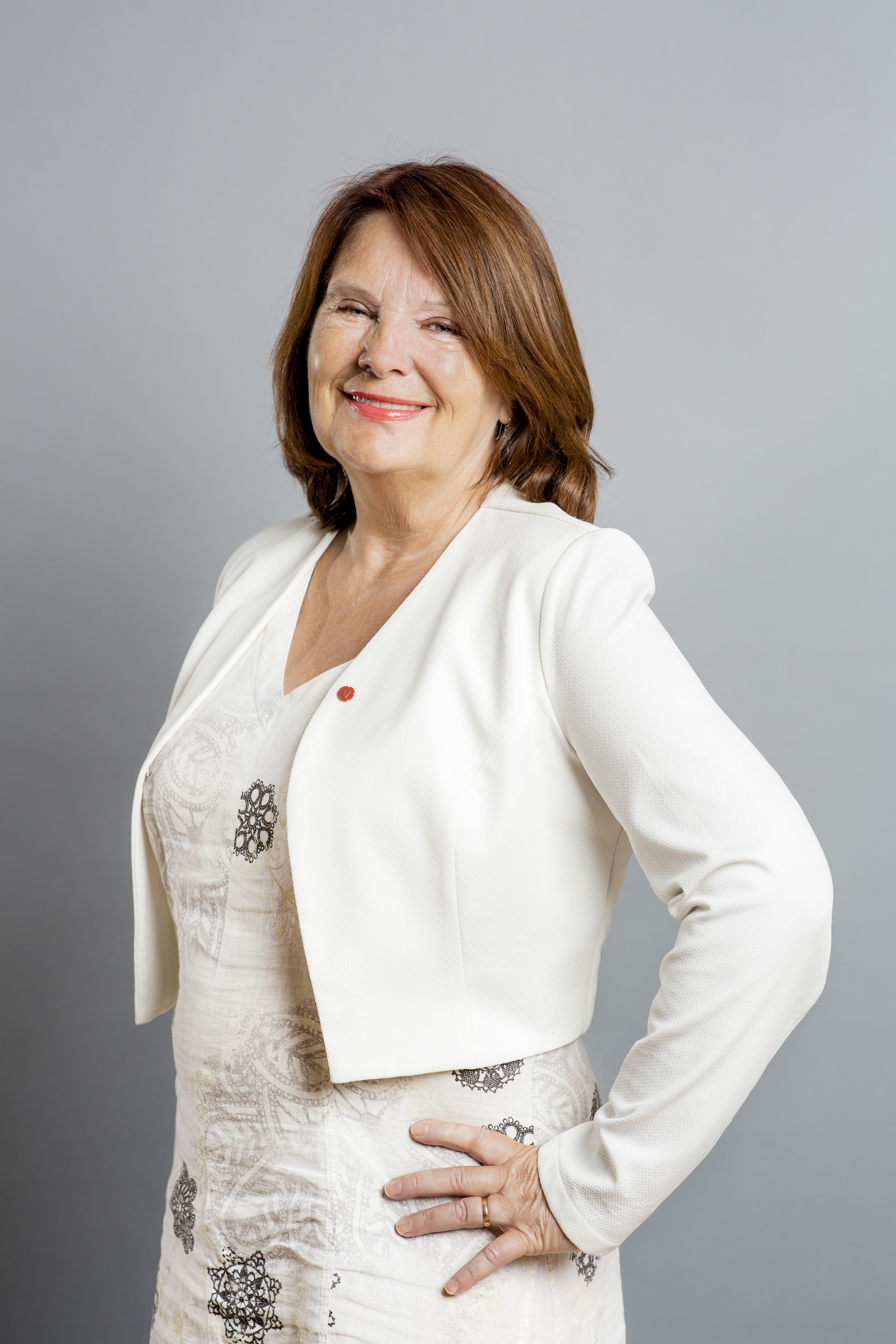
- Lotta Johnsson Fornarve in 2018

Second Deputy Speaker of the Riksdag
- In office 24 September 2018 – 26 September 2022
- Monarch: Carl XVI Gustaf
- Preceded by: Björn Söder
- Succeeded by: Julia Kronlid

Member of the Riksdag for Södermanland
- Incumbent
- Assumed office 2014

Personal details
- Born: 13 April 1956 (age 70) Flen, Sweden
- Party: Left Party
- Education: Stockholm University; Linköping University
- Profession: Teacher

Lotta Johnsson Fornarve (born Lise-Lotte Kristina Jonsson Fornarve on 13 April 1956) is a Swedish politician for the Left Party. She was elected to the Riksdag after the 2014 general election, taking up the number 2 seat for Södermanland County constituency. On September 24, 2018, after the election of the Speaker of the Riksdag Andreas Norlén, she was elected as Second Deputy Speaker of the Riksdag. She is a former member of the municipal council in Linköping Municipality and Oxelösund Municipality.

== Biography ==
=== Education ===
Lotta Johnsson Fornarve studied at Stockholm Institute of Education. She has a BA in Social anthropology from Linköping University.

=== Working career ===
Johnsson Fornarve is a high school teacher and a Swedish For Immigrants (SFI) teacher. Between 1976 and 1994, she was the international secretary of Isolera Sydafrika-Kommittén (Isolate the South Africa Committee (ISAK)). She worked as a SFI teacher in Norrköping Municipality and Nyköping Municipality until 2014.

=== Assosiactions ===
Johnsson Fornarve is a board member for Vänsterns internationella forum (VIF) and was the district president for the Left Party in Södermanland between 2006 and 2012. She has also been a member of the Left party's board of directors between the years of 2010 to 2016.

=== Political career ===
Johnsson Fornarve has held several political positions, including being a member of the Linköping municipal council between 1998 and 2002 and of the Oxelösund municipal council between 2006 and 2014. Between 2010 and 2014 she was the chairman of the municipality board for culture and leisure in Oxelösund. She was elected into the Swedish Riksdag after the 2014 general election.

She took over as the left party's defense-political spokesperson in 2017 after Stig Henriksson resigned. She kept her post until the 2018 general election.

She was elected Second Deputy Speaker of the Riksdag in 2018.

She is a member of the Defence Committee and Joint Committee for Defence and Foreign affairs. She is an alternate for the Civil Committee, Foreign Affairs Committee, Education Committee, and Swedish Council of Europe delegation.

Political offices
Preceded by Björn Söder	Second Deputy Speaker of the Riksdag; 2018–2022	Succeeded by Julia Kronlid
