= Moderate Women's League of Sweden =

The Moderate Women's League of Sweden (Swedish: Sveriges Moderata Kvinnoförbund) was a right-wing conservative women's organization in Sweden. SMKF was founded in 1915. It published Medborgarinnan 1922–1930. In 1937, SMKF ceased to function as an independent organization, as it merged with the Central Women's Council of the General Electoral Union (AVF).
