= Committee on Foreign Affairs (Sweden) =

Swedish parliamentary committee

The (Parliamentary) Committee on Foreign Affairs (Swedish: Utrikesutskottet, UU) is a parliamentary committee in the Swedish Riksdag. The committee prepares matters concerning the state's relationship to and agreements with other states and international organizations, assistance to other countries' development, representing the Swedish state abroad, as well as helping with diplomatic situations abroad. The committee also handles matters concerning foreign trade and international economic cooperation. They also handle matters that non of the other seventeen other parliamentary committees handle.

The Committee on Foreign Affairs should not be confused with the Advisory Council on Foreign Affairs, which is a forum for the Government to discuss and seek support for its foreign policy with the Riksdag. The Advisory Council on Foreign Affairs is chaired by the Swedish king.

Since 2022, the Speaker of the committee is Aron Emilsson for the Sweden Democrats along with the vice-Speaker of the committee Morgan Johansson for the Social Democratic Party.

== List of speakers for the committee ==
| Name | Period | Political party |
|---|---|---|
| Östen Undén | 1938-1945 | Social Democratic Party |
| Rickard Sandler | 1946–1964 | Social Democratic Party |
| Bengt Elmgren | 1965–1966 | Social Democratic Party |
| Arne Geijer | 1967–1976 | Social Democratic Party |
| Allan Hernelius | 1976-1982 | Moderate Party |
| Stig Alemyr | 1982-1991 | Social Democratic Party |
| Daniel Tarschys | 1991–1994 | People's Party |
| Karl-Göran Biörsmark | 1994 | Liberal People's Party |
| Maj-Lis Lööw | 1994–1995 | Social Democratic Party |
| Viola Furubjelke | 1995–2002 | Social Democratic Party |
| Urban Ahlin | 2002–2006 | Social Democratic Party |
| Sten Tolgfors | 2006 | Moderate Party |
| Göran Lennmarker | 2006–2010 | Moderate Party |
| Karin Enström | 2010–2012 | Moderate Party |
| Sofia Arkelsten | 2012–2014 | Moderate Party |
| Kenneth G. Forslund | 2014–2018 | Social Democratic Party |
| Hans Wallmark | 2018-2019 | Moderate Party |
| Kenneth G. Forslund | 2019–2022 | Social Democratic Party |
| Aron Emilsson | 2022– | Sweden Democrats |

== List of vice-speakers for the committee ==
| Name | Period | Political party |
|---|---|---|
| Pär Granstedt | 1988–1991 | Center Party |
| Pierre Schori | 1991–1994 | Social Democratic Party |
| Margaretha af Ugglas | 1994–1995 | Moderate Party |
| Göran Lennmarker | 1995-2003 | Moderate Party |
| Gunilla Carlsson | 2003–2006 | Moderate Party |
| Urban Ahlin | 2006–2014 | Social Democratic Party |
| Karin Enström | 2014–2017 | Moderate Party |
| Jonas Jacobsson Gjörtler | 2017-2018 | Moderate Party |
| Kenneth G. Forslund | 2018–2019 | Social Democratic Party |
| Hans Wallmark | 2019–2022 | Moderate Party |
| Olle Thorell | 2022 | Social Democratic Party |
| Morgan Johansson | 2022– | Social Democratic Party |
