= Kerstin Lundgren =

Swedish politician (born 1955)

Kerstin Lundgren C
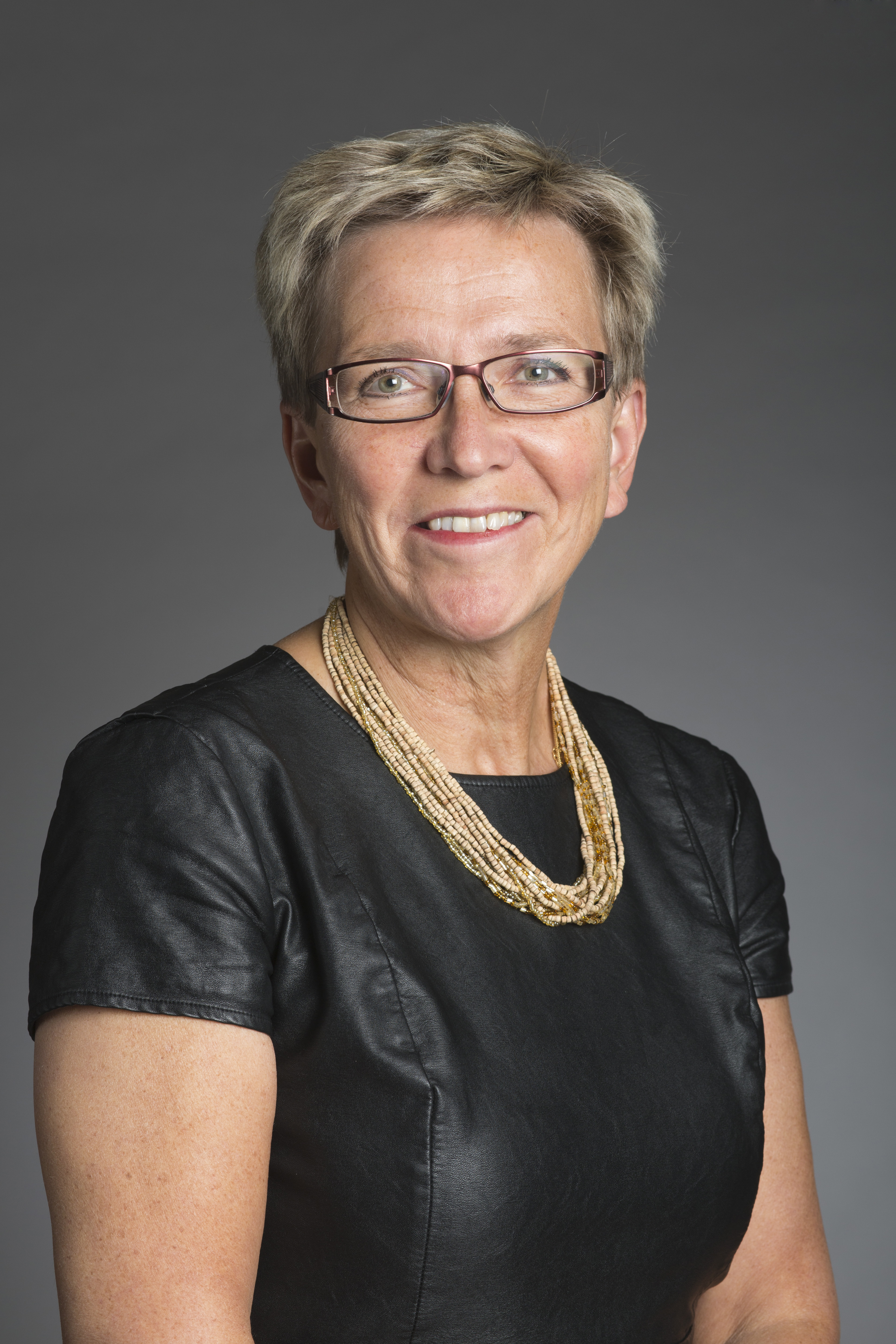
- Kerstin Lundgren in October 2013

Third Deputy Speaker of the Riksdag
- Incumbent
- Assumed office 24 September 2018
- Speaker: Andreas Norlén
- Preceded by: Esabelle Dingizian

Member of the Riksdag
- Incumbent
- Assumed office 2002
- Constituency: Stockholm County

Personal details
- Born: 14 January 1955 (age 71) Kramfors, Sweden
- Party: Centre Party
- Education: Uppsala University

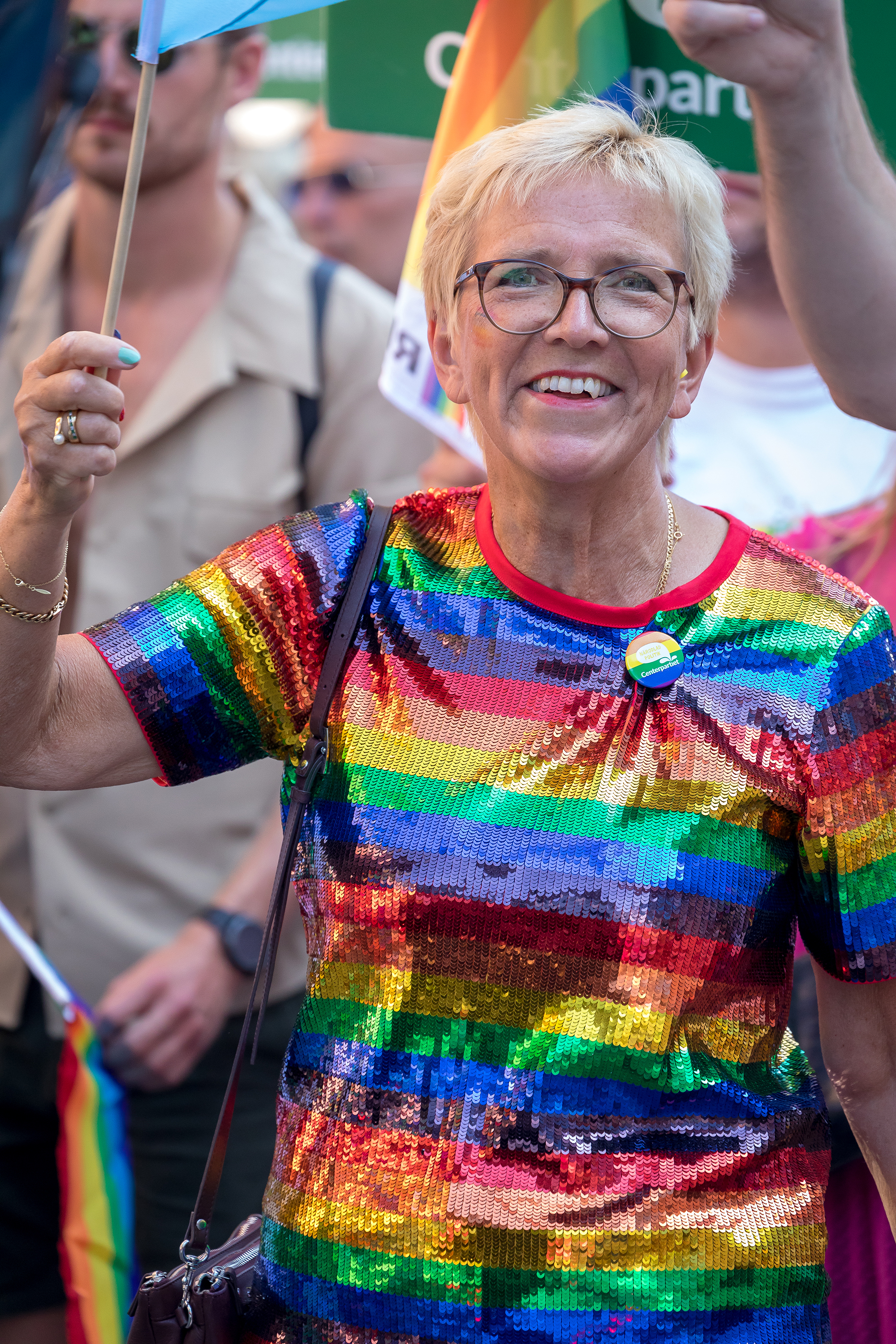
Kerstin Lundgren at Stockholm Pride 2019

Kerstin Margareta Lundgren (born 14 January 1955) is a Swedish Centre Party politician. She has been a member of the Riksdag since 2002, taking up seat number 2 for Stockholm County's constituency. Since the September 24, 2018, Speaker of the Riksdag election, Lundgren was elected as third deputy speaker and serving as the current Third Deputy Speaker of the Riksdag. She is also a member of the AWEPA Governing Council.

== Political career ==
In the Swedish parliament, Lundgren has been serving on the Constitution Committee from 2002 to 2006, on Foreign Affairs since 2006. She is also a member of the War-delegation since 2018. She is currently the foreign policy spokesperson of the Centre Party.

In addition to her role in parliament, Lundgren has been serving as a member of the Swedish delegation to the Parliamentary Assembly of the Council of Europe since 2007. As a member of the Centre Party, she is part of the Alliance of Liberals and Democrats for Europe group. She is currently the vice-chairwoman of the Assembly's Sub-Committee on the Middle East and the Arab World; a member of the Committee on Legal Affairs and Human Rights; and a member of the Committee on the Honouring of Obligations and Commitments by Member States of the Council of Europe (Monitoring Committee). Alongside Boris Tsilevitch of Latvia (2015–2017) and later Titus Corlățean of Romania (since 2018), she serves as the Assembly's co-rapporteur on Georgia. Prior to that mandate, she was the rapporteur on the impact of the Lisbon Treaty on the Council of Europe.

In 2020, Lundgren joined the Inter-Parliamentary Alliance on China.
