= Sofia Arkelsten =

Swedish politician of the Moderate Party

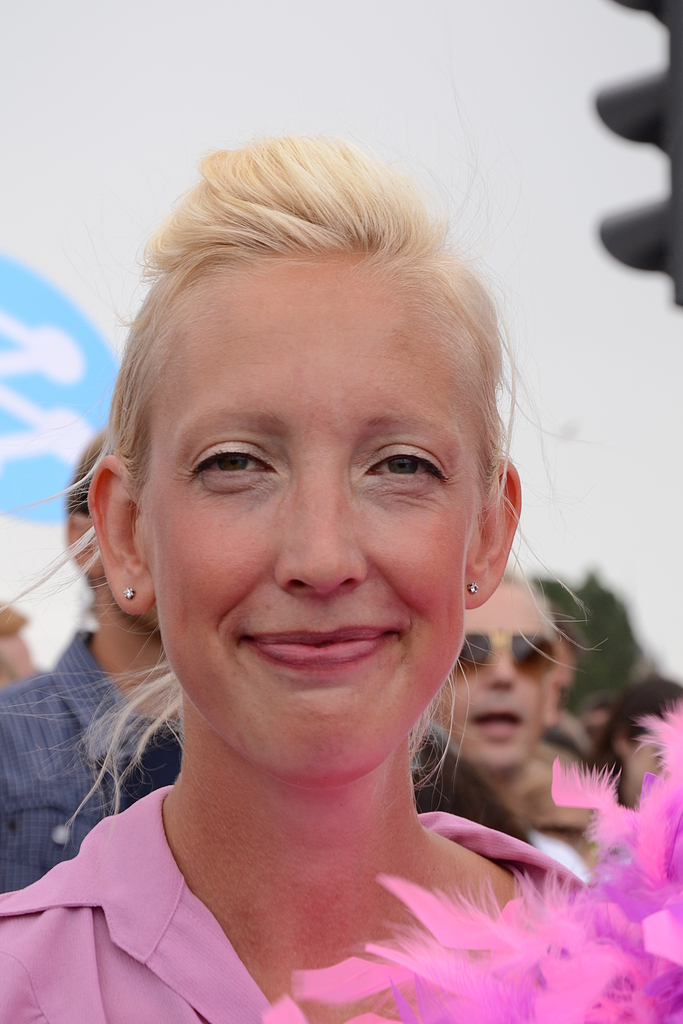

Member of the Swedish Riksdag for Stockholm Municipality
- In office 6 October 2006 – 24 September 2018

Secretary of the Moderate Party
- In office 1 October 2010 – 20 April 2012
- Party leader: Fredrik Reinfeldt
- Preceded by: Per Schlingmann
- Succeeded by: Kent Persson

Personal details
- Born: 6 December 1976 (age 49) Stockholm, Sweden
- Party: Moderate Party
- Occupation: Politician

Hanna Sofia Margareta Arkelsten (born 6 December 1976) is a Swedish politician of the Moderate Party. She served as member of the Swedish Riksdag from 2006 to 2018, representing her home constituency of Stockholm Municipality.

Arkelsten served as Secretary of the Moderate Party from 2010 to 2012 and Chairman of the Committee on Foreign Affairs in 2012 and again from 2013 to 2014.

== Career ==
=== Early career ===
Arkelsten previously worked on Svensk Handel and on ICA Sweden as director of communications.

She was previously active in municipal politics in Stockholm, including the Environment and Health Committee, Maria-Gamla Stan District and the City Council.

== Parliament ==
Upon joining parliament in 2006 she was a deputy to Beatrice Ask then deputy for Prime Minister Fredrik Reinfeldt a month later in November. She was not a regular member of parliament until 17 September 2007, when she stopped being deputy. From 26 April 2012 to 18 November 2012, she was Chairman of the Committee on Foreign Affairs, repeating this role from 1 April 2013 to 29 September 2014.

She officially left parliament on 24 September 2018.

=== Party Secretary ===
On 1 October 2010 she replaced Per Schlingmann as party-Secretary of the Moderate Party. On 20 April 2012 she resigned of her own accord.

== Personal life ==
Sofia Arkelsten was born in Stockholm. In April 2011 she married Olof Torvestig and she is an outspoken vegetarian. Her first child, a daughter, was born on 25 November 2012. On 16 October 2014, Arkelsten told a newspaper that she had been diagnosed with chronic disease multiple sclerosis (MS). She said the prognosis was good although the disease was chronic.

Party political offices
Preceded by Per Schlingmann	Secretary of the Moderate Party; 2010–2012	Succeeded by Kent Persson
Political offices
Preceded by Karin Enström	Chairman of the Foreign Affairs Committee; 2012, 2013-2014	Succeeded by Kenneth G. Forslund
