= Kent Persson (politician) =

Swedish politician

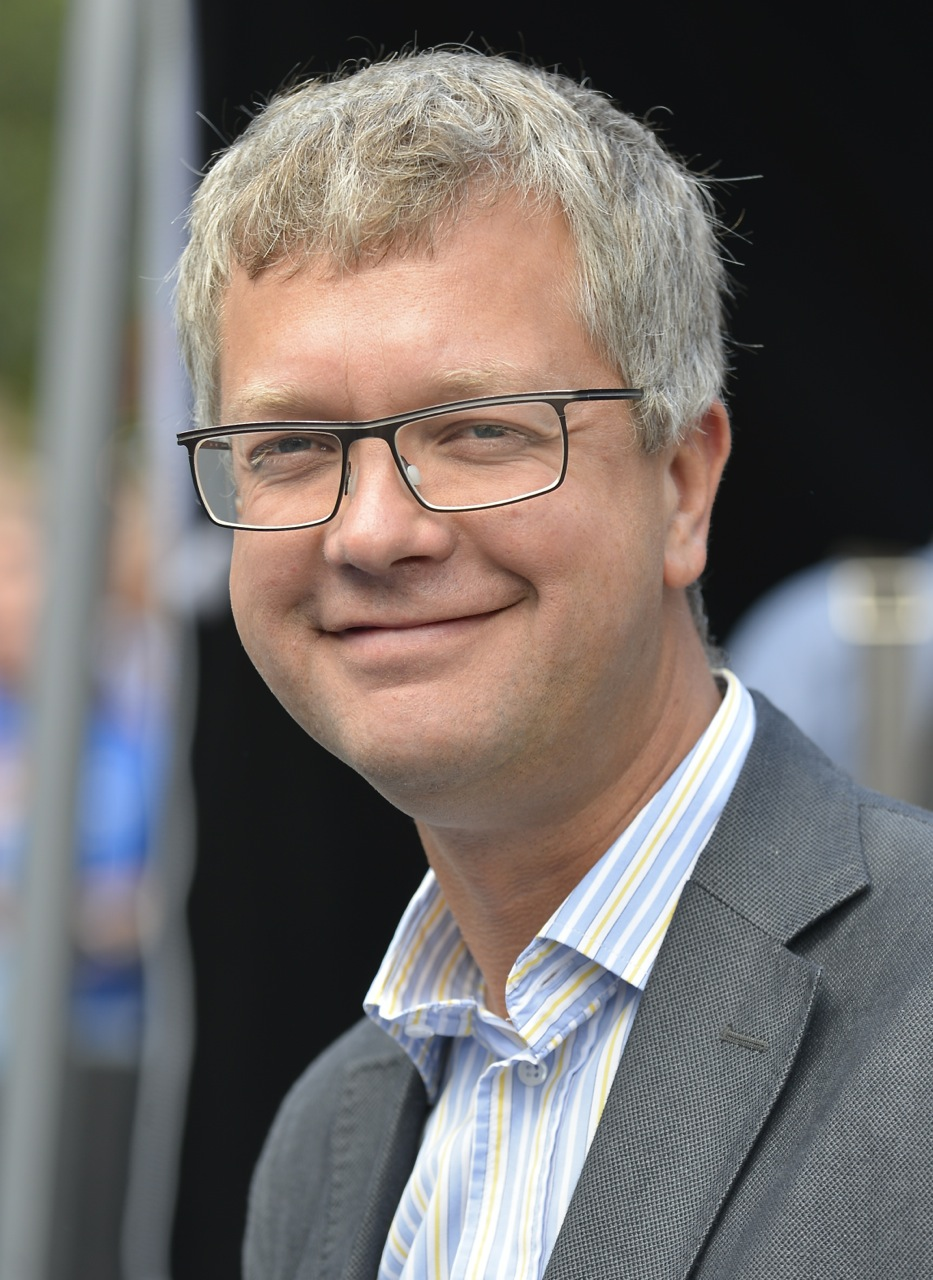

Party secretary of the Moderate Party
- In office 20 April 2012 – 10 January 2015
- Party leader: Fredrik Reinfeldt
- Preceded by: Sofia Arkelsten
- Succeeded by: Tomas Tobé

Personal details
- Born: 3 March 1971 (age 55) Örebro, Sweden
- Party: Moderate Party
- Spouse: Anna-Karin Persson
- Children: 2
- Occupation: Politician

Kent Fredrik Persson (born 3 March 1971) is a Swedish politician who was party secretary of the Moderate Party from 2012 to 2015. On 18 December 2014, Persson announced his resignation as party secretary following the party's leadership election on 10 January 2015, and to leave the political arena.

From 2011 to 2012, Persson was the opposition leader in Örebro Municipality and was earlier opposition leader for Örebro County Council. He was also provincial chairman of the Moderate Party in Örebro County until 2012 and was a member of the executive board of the Moderate Party from 2011 to 2015.

Kent Persson is married and has two children. He is a teetotaler.
