= Liselott Hagberg =

Swedish politician (born 1958)

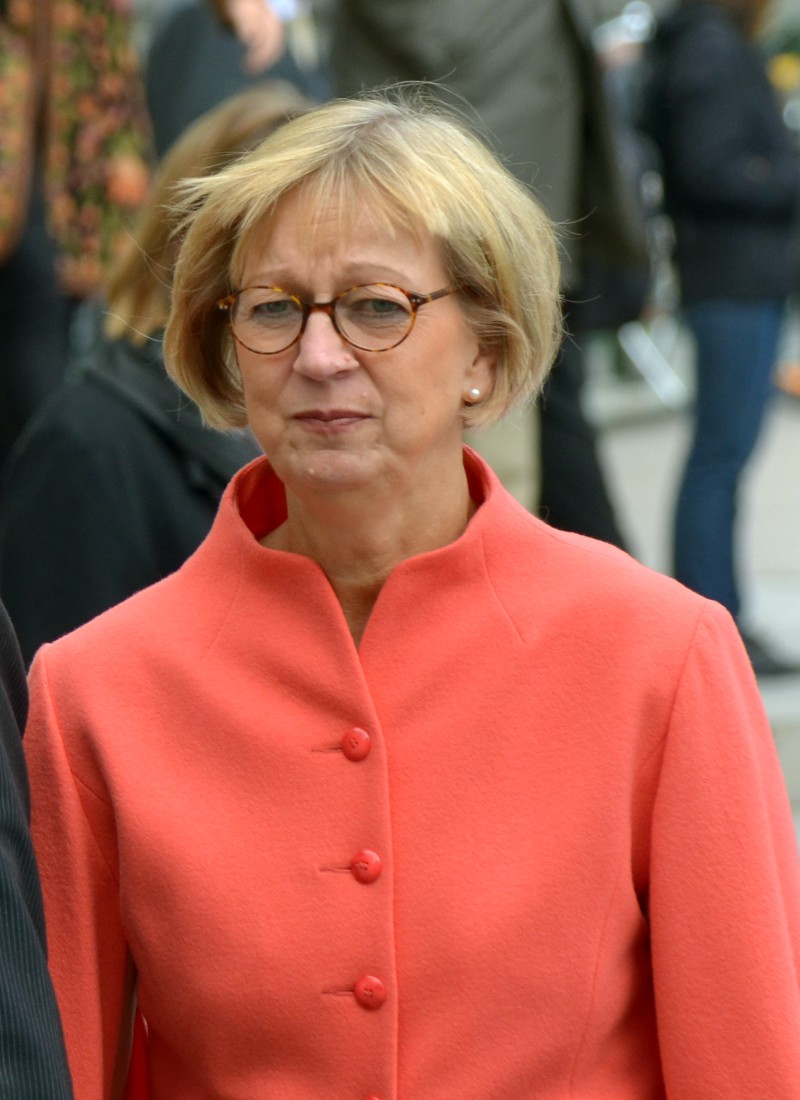

Governor of Södermanland County
- In office 2012 – 31 December 2019
- Preceded by: Bo Könberg
- Succeeded by: Beatrice Ask

Member of the Riksdag
- In office 2002–2012
- Constituency: Södermanland County

Personal details
- Born: 1958 (age 67–68) Uddevalla, Sweden
- Spouse: Göran
- Children: 3

Liselott Hagberg (born 1958) is a Swedish Liberal politician who was a member of the Riksdag between 2002 and 2012. She was the Third Deputy Speaker of the Riksdag 2006–2012. In October 2012, Hagberg became Governor of Södermanland County. She served until the end of her extended term, on 31 December 2019.

== Awards ==
- Commander's Cross of the Order of Merit of the Republic of Poland (2010)
