= Aron Emilsson =

Swedish politician (born 1990)

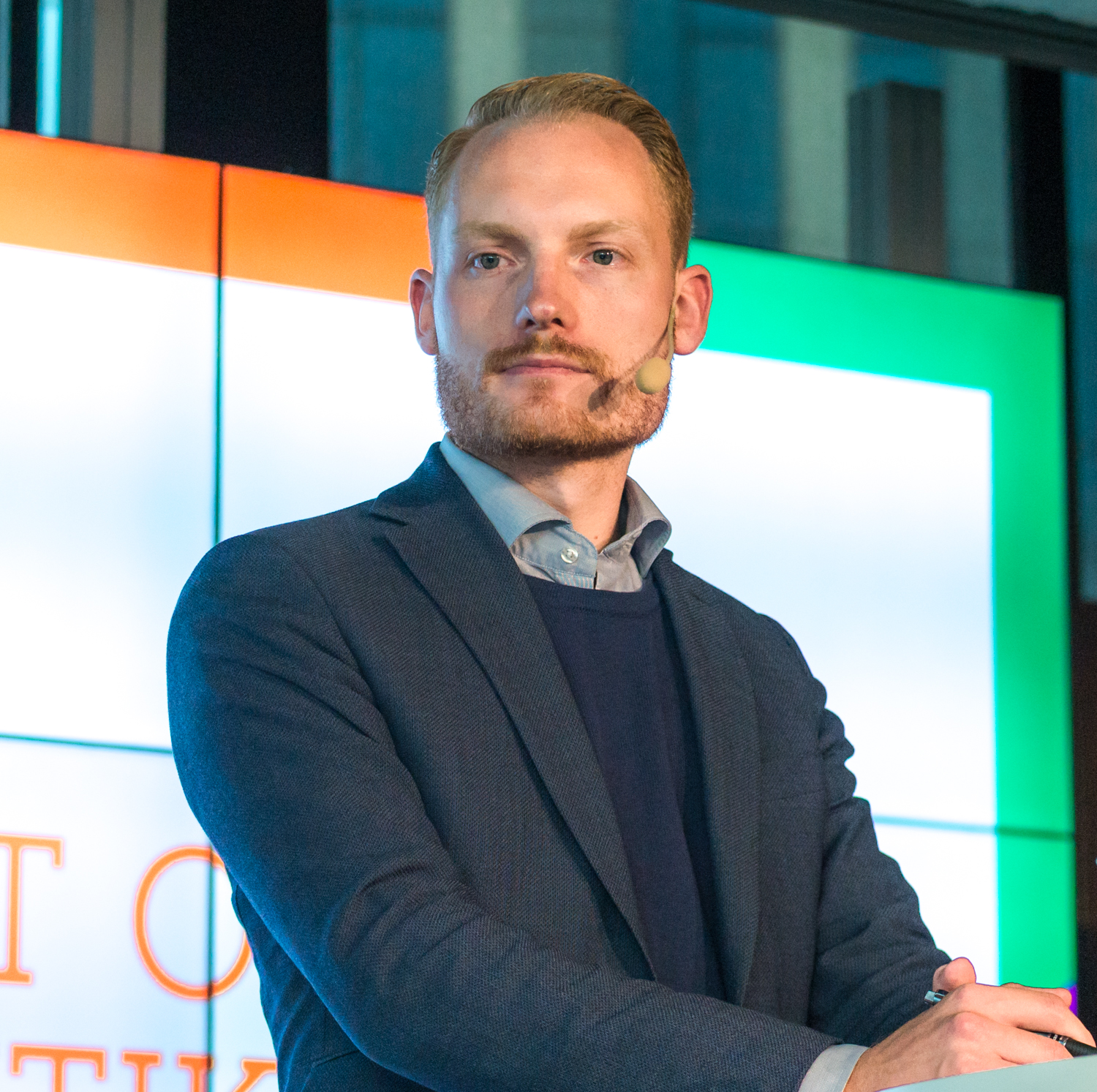
- Aron Emilsson during a political debate inside the Stockholm Culture House in August 2018

Member of the Riksdag
- Incumbent
- Assumed office 2014
- Constituency: Östergötland County

Personal details
- Born: 20 February 1990 (age 36) Älvsborg County
- Party: Sweden Democrats
- Education: University of Gothenburg

Robert Aron Emilsson (born 20 February 1990) is a Swedish politician and member of the Riksdag for the Sweden Democrats party. He represents the Östergötland County constituency. He also serves as the SD's spokesman on foreign policy.

In parliament he has sat on the Social Affairs Committee, the Foreign Affairs committee and the Committee on Culture. Since 2022, he has also served as chairman of the Committee on Foreign Affairs.

== Biography ==
Emilsson acquired a bachelor's degree at the University of Gothenburg.

He was elected to the Riksdag during the 2014 Swedish general election.

=== Member of Parliament ===
In 2014, he was elected to Sweden's Riksdag, where he was a member of the culture committee, a deputy in the environment and agriculture committee and a member of the Nordic Council's Swedish delegation. Since 20 October 2021, he is a member of the Foreign Affairs Committee.
