= Moderate Party =

Political party in Sweden

Moderate Party Moderata samlingspartiet
- Abbreviation: M
- Chairperson: Ulf Kristersson
- Secretary: Karin Enström
- Parliamentary group leader: Mattias Karlsson
- Founded: 17 October 1904; 122 years ago
- Headquarters: Blasieholmsgatan 4 A, Norrmalm, Stockholm
- Student wing: Moderate Students (official); Confederation of Swedish Conservative and Liberal Students (unofficial)
- Youth wing: Moderate Youth League
- LGBT wing: Open Moderates
- Membership (2025): ▲48,688
- Ideology: Liberal conservatism Pro-Europeanism
- Political position: Centre-right
- European affiliation: European People's Party
- European Parliament group: European People's Party Group
- International affiliation: International Democracy Union
- Nordic affiliation: Conservative Group
- Colours: Dark blue (official) (Note: Since 2019); Light blue; Sky blue (customary)
- Slogan: För ett rättvisare Sverige ('For a fairer Sweden')
- Riksdag: 70 / 349
- European Parliament: 4 / 21
- County councils: 328 / 1,720 (19%)
- Municipal councils: 2,584 / 12,614 (20%)

Website
- moderaterna.se

The Moderate Party (Swedish: Moderata samlingspartiet [mʊdɛˈrɑ̌ːta ˈsâmːlɪŋspaˌʈiːɛt], lit. 'Moderate Coalition Party', M), commonly referred to as the Moderates (Swedish: Moderaterna [mʊdɛˈrɑ̌ːtɛɳa]), is a liberal-conservative political party in Sweden. The party generally supports tax cuts, the free market, civil liberties and economic liberalism. Globally, it is a full member of the International Democracy Union and the European People's Party.

The party was founded in 1904 as the General Electoral League (Allmänna valmansförbundet [ˈâlːmɛnːa ˈvɑ̂ːlmansfœrˌbɵndɛt]) by a group of conservatives in the Riksdag, the Swedish parliament. The party was later known as The Right (Högern [ˈhø̌ːɡɛɳ]; 1938–1952) and The Right Party (Högerpartiet [ˈhø̂ːɡɛrpaˌʈiːɛt]; 1952–1969). During this time, the party was usually called the Conservative Party and adhered to a purely conservative and nationalistic ideologies, whereas today its ideology combines conservative and liberal ideas.

After holding minor posts in centre-right governments, the Moderates eventually became the leading opposition party to the Swedish Social Democratic Party and since then those two parties have dominated Swedish politics. After the 1991 Swedish general election, party leader Carl Bildt formed a minority government, the first administration since 1930 to be headed by a member of the party, which lasted three years. The party returned to government under leader and Prime Minister Fredrik Reinfeldt, after the 2006 and 2010 general elections. In 2010, the party was the leading member of the Alliance, a centre-right coalition, along with the Centre Party (C), the Christian Democrats (KD) and the Liberal People's Party (FP), and obtained its best result ever (30.1%), despite the coalition not being able to obtain majority.

The current chairman of the party, Ulf Kristersson, was elected at a special party congress on 1 October 2017, following Anna Kinberg Batra's sudden resignation. Kinberg Batra had replaced Reinfeldt, Prime Minister from 2006 to 2014. Under Reinfeldt's leadership, the party moved more towards the centre. Under Kristersson's leadership, the party moved back to the right and opened up to the Sweden Democrats (SD) following the 2018 Swedish general election. Having formed in late 2021 an informal right-wing alliance with SD and two former Alliance members, KD and L, with Kristersson as the prime ministerial candidate, this right-wing bloc obtained a narrow win in the 2022 Swedish general election and formed the Kristersson cabinet.

== History ==
=== General Electoral League (1904–1938) ===
The party was founded on 17 October 1904 in a restaurant called Runan in Stockholm. The intention was to start a campaign organization in support of the group of Conservatives which had emerged in the Riksdag. During the 19th century conservatives had organised themselves in the Riksdag but there was no party to support them. The Swedish right was also threatened by the rise of the Swedish Social Democratic Party (founded in 1889) and the Liberals (1902). The party was called the General Electoral League (Swedish: Allmänna valmansförbundet). The founders of the party initially held a principled opposition to the concept of political parties, viewing political agitation as a source of national division and instability. However, the organization was established out of a perceived necessity among conservatives to counter the growing the influence of the Social Democrats and the radical left.

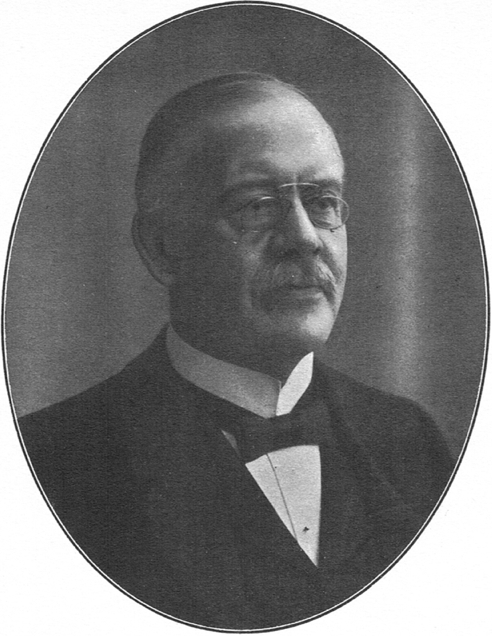
Gustaf Fredrik Östberg, was the first chairman of the party.

At first, the party was clearly nationalist and staunchly conservative. The importance of a strong defence was underlined and other societal institutions embraced by the party were the monarchy and the state of law. The party initially held a protectionist view towards the economy; tariffs were widely supported as well as interventionist economical measures such as agricultural subsidies. In the defence policy crisis in 1914 (which overturned the parliamentary Liberal government), the party sided with King Gustaf V but stopped short of accepting a right-wing government by royal appointment, instead opting for an independent-conservative "war cabinet" under Hjalmar Hammarskjöld which was eventually overturned in favour of a Liberal-Social Democratic majority coalition government and thus the breakthrough of parliamentary rule, albeit reluctantly embraced by the right.

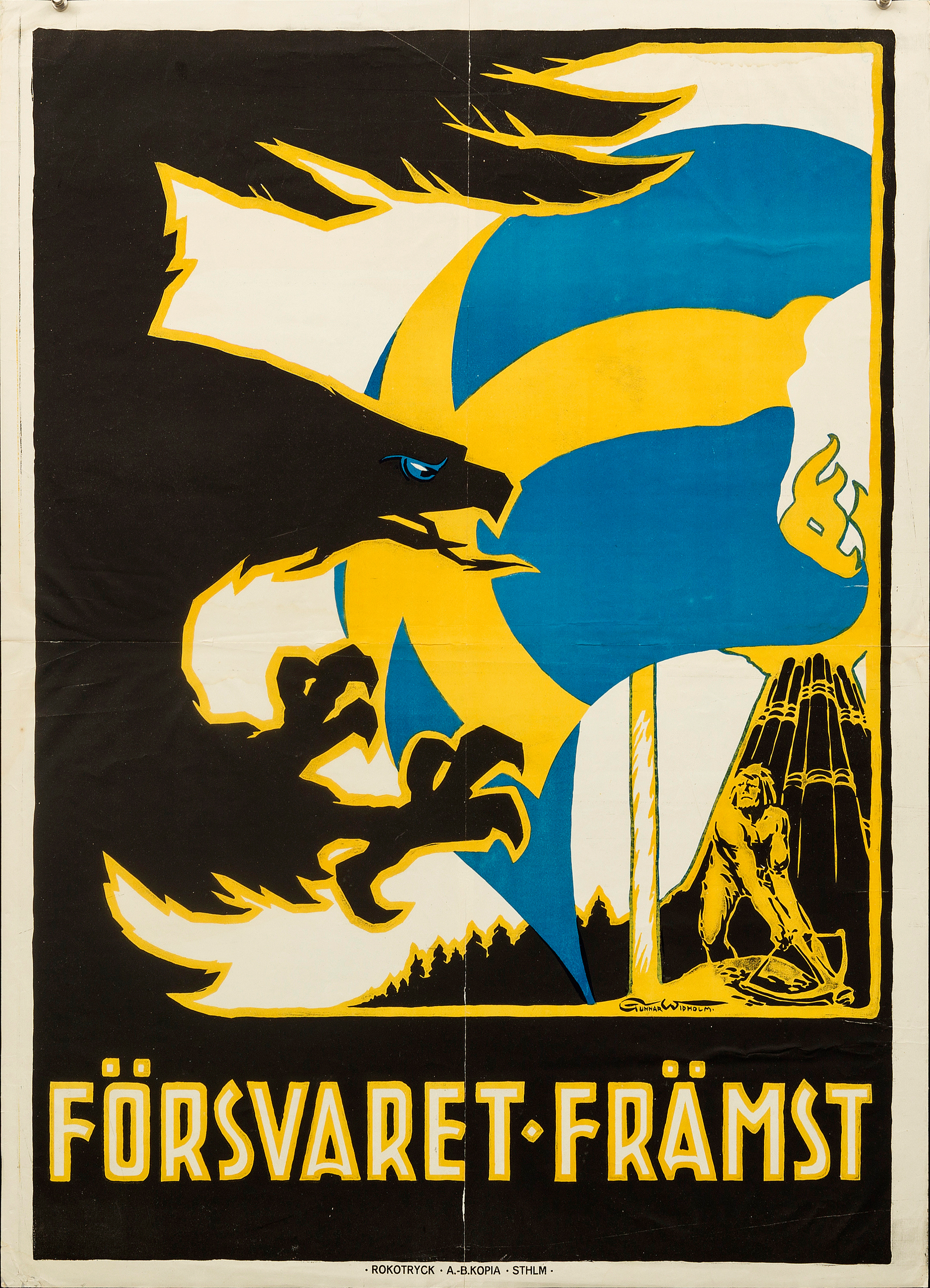
An election poster from the party in 1914 stating that military defense comes first.

Arvid Lindman (often called "The Admiral") became influential in the party and served two terms as Prime Minister of Sweden, before and after the enactment of universal suffrage. In 1907, he proposed universal male suffrage to the parliament and in 1912 he was formally elected leader. But the party voted against universal suffrage and the party again voted against women's right to vote. It was only because the party was in the minority that Sweden was able to grant the right to vote for all, pushed through by the Liberals and the Social Democrats (the left), against the objections of the right. Although not one of the founders of the party and not a prominent ideologist, Lindman and his achievements as a leader are often appreciated as being of great importance to the new party. His leadership was marked by a consolidation of the Swedish right, and by transforming the party into a modern, effective, political movement. Lindman was a very pragmatic politician, but without losing his principles. He was a formidable negotiator and peace broker. For this, he was widely respected, even by his fiercest political opponents and when he resigned and left the parliament in 1935, the leader of the Social Democrats, Per Albin Hansson, expressed his "honest thanks over the battle lines".

From the beginning of the 20th century, social democracy and the labour movement rose to replace liberalism as the major political force for radical reforms. The Moderate Party intensified its opposition to socialism during the leadership of Lindman—the importance of continuance and strengthening national business were cornerstones. But at the same time, recent social issues gained significant political attention; by appeasing the working class, the party also hoped to reduce the threat of revolutionary tendencies. During the governments led by Lindman, several reforms for social progress were made, and it was his first government that initiated the public state pension.

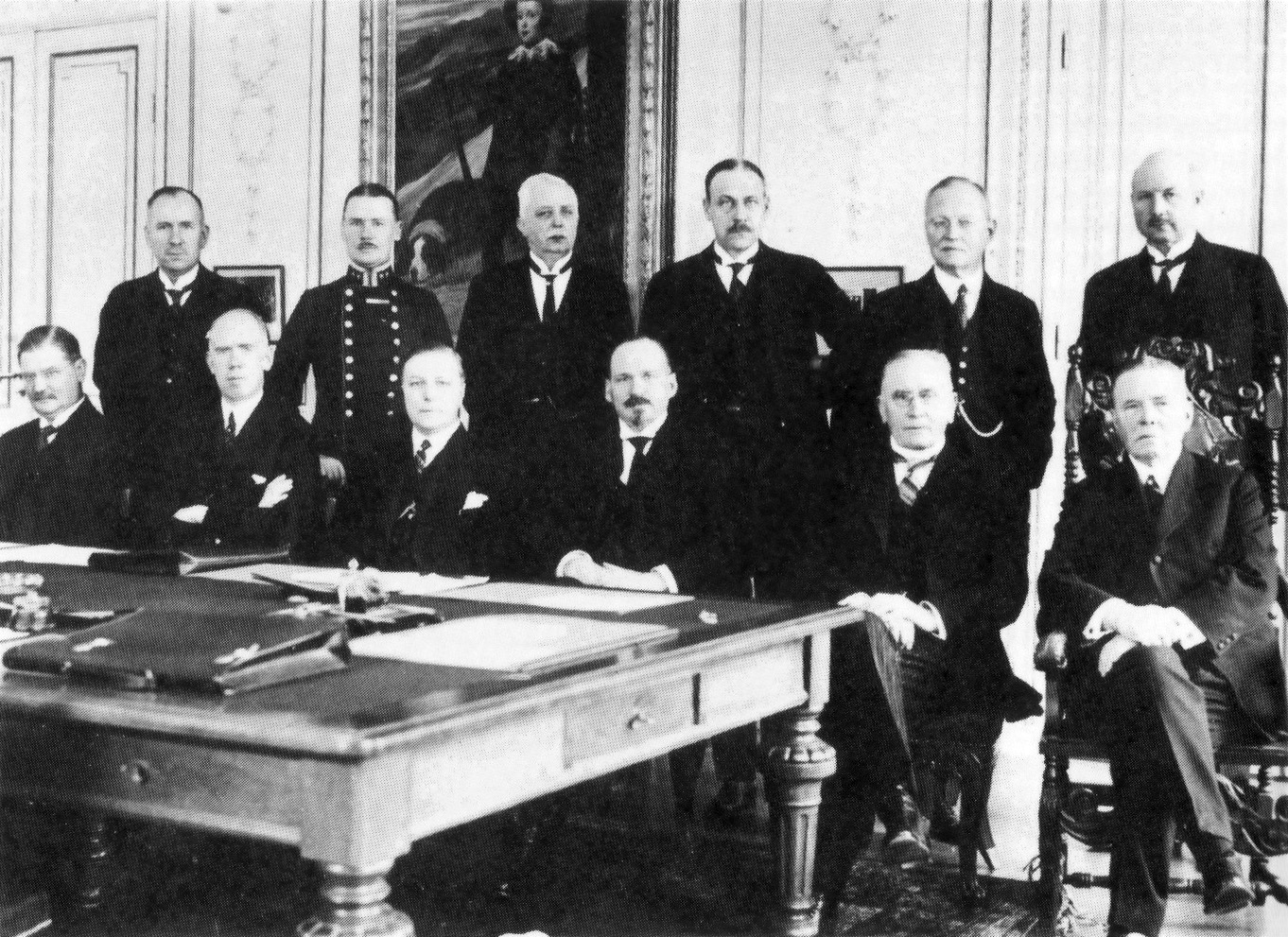
The second cabinet of Arvid Lindman in 1928.

In the 1920s, the Swedish right slowly started to move towards a classical liberal view on economic issues, mainly under the influence of the liberal economist Gustav Cassel, but the economic downturn following the Great Depression frustrated the possible liberal transition of their economic policy. Before that occurred the party gained its greatest success yet with 29.4% in the general election of 1928, often called the Cossack Election, on a clearly anti-socialist programme. The government later formed by the party did not accept the concept of the market economy but continued the protectionist policy by generous financial aid. The government also began complete regulation of agriculture. Production associations, with the objective to administer the regulations and running monopolies on imports, were also established during the period. All this made for a corporate control of the Swedish economy unsurpassed since the popularisation of liberalism at the end of the 19th century. The government of Lindman fell in 1930 after the Social Democrats and the Freeminded People's Party had blocked a proposition for a raised customs duty on grain.

The 1930s saw the party in conflict over how to relate to the rising threat of National Socialism and Fascism. Its loosely affiliated youth organisation, the National Youth League of Sweden (Swedish: Sveriges Nationella Ungdomsförbund) increasingly adopted anti-democratic positions, was openly pro-Nazi and set up uniformed "fighting groups" to combat political enemies on the streets. The mother party did not like this development, with Lindman clearly stating that pro-Nazi views were not to be accepted in the party, and in 1933 the National Youth League was separated from the party. While the party set up a new youth league in 1934, called The Young Swedes (known since 1969 as the Moderate Youth League), the core of the old one (in spite of some districts, such as Young Swedes-Gothenburg joining the new one) set up its own party—the National League of Sweden—taking with them three of the mother party's MPs and unsuccessfully fighting elections as a radical conservative and openly pro-Nazi party.

=== National Organization of the Right (1938–1952) ===
The party participated in the third cabinet of Per Albin Hansson during the Second World War. It was a grand coalition including all major parties, only excluding the Communist Party and the pro-Nazi Socialist Party, both parties being members of the parliament at this time.

In 1934, the Social Democrats formed a new government, and except for the World War II era, would stay in power until 1976. From having been a ruling party, the General Electoral League turned into a bastion of right-wing opposition, and in 1938 it was renamed the National Organization of the Right (Swedish: Högerns riksorganisation [ˈhøːɡɛɳʂ ˈrɪ̂ksɔrɡanɪsaˌɧuːn]), a name that would stay until 1952. Outside Sweden, the party was typically called the Conservative Party.

After the Second World War, the party gradually lost support and the Liberals rose to become the second most popular party after the Social Democrats.

=== Conservative Party (1952–1969) ===
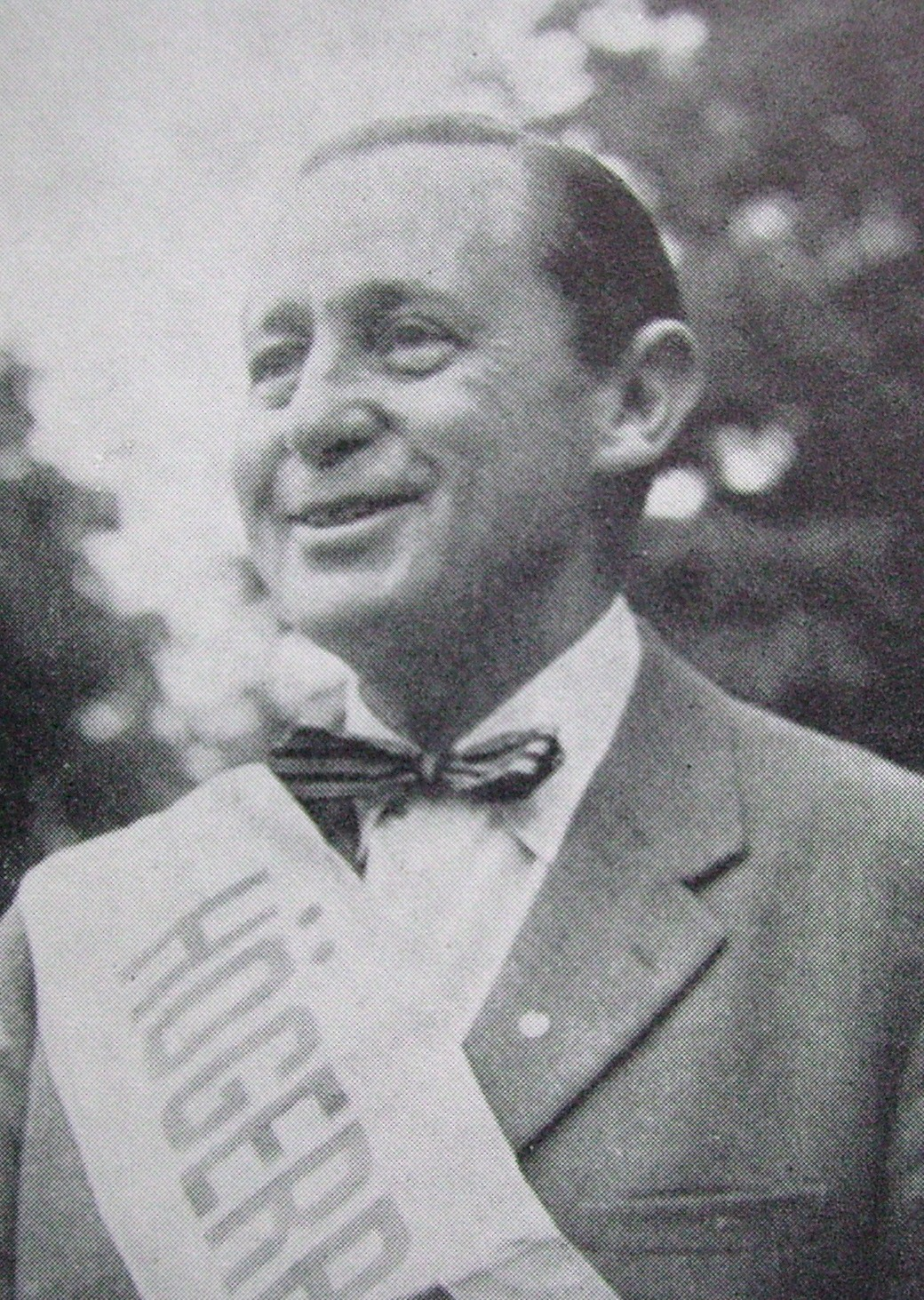
Jarl Hjalmarsson, leader of the party between 1950 and 1961.

At the beginning of the 1950s, the party re-emerged after being renamed the Rightist Party (Swedish: Högerpartiet); its name outside Sweden remained Conservative Party. Under the leadership of Jarl Hjalmarson (1950–1961) the party became a prominent voice against the rising levels of taxation and a defender of private ownership from, what the party saw as, the growing tendencies of state centralization.

The party had significant success in the elections during the 1950s and became the largest party of the opposition in 1958. However, the next decade brought changes to the political climate of Sweden. The election of 1968 gave the Social Democrats an absolute majority in the parliament and made the Rightist Party into the smallest party of the opposition.

=== Moderate Party (1969–present) ===
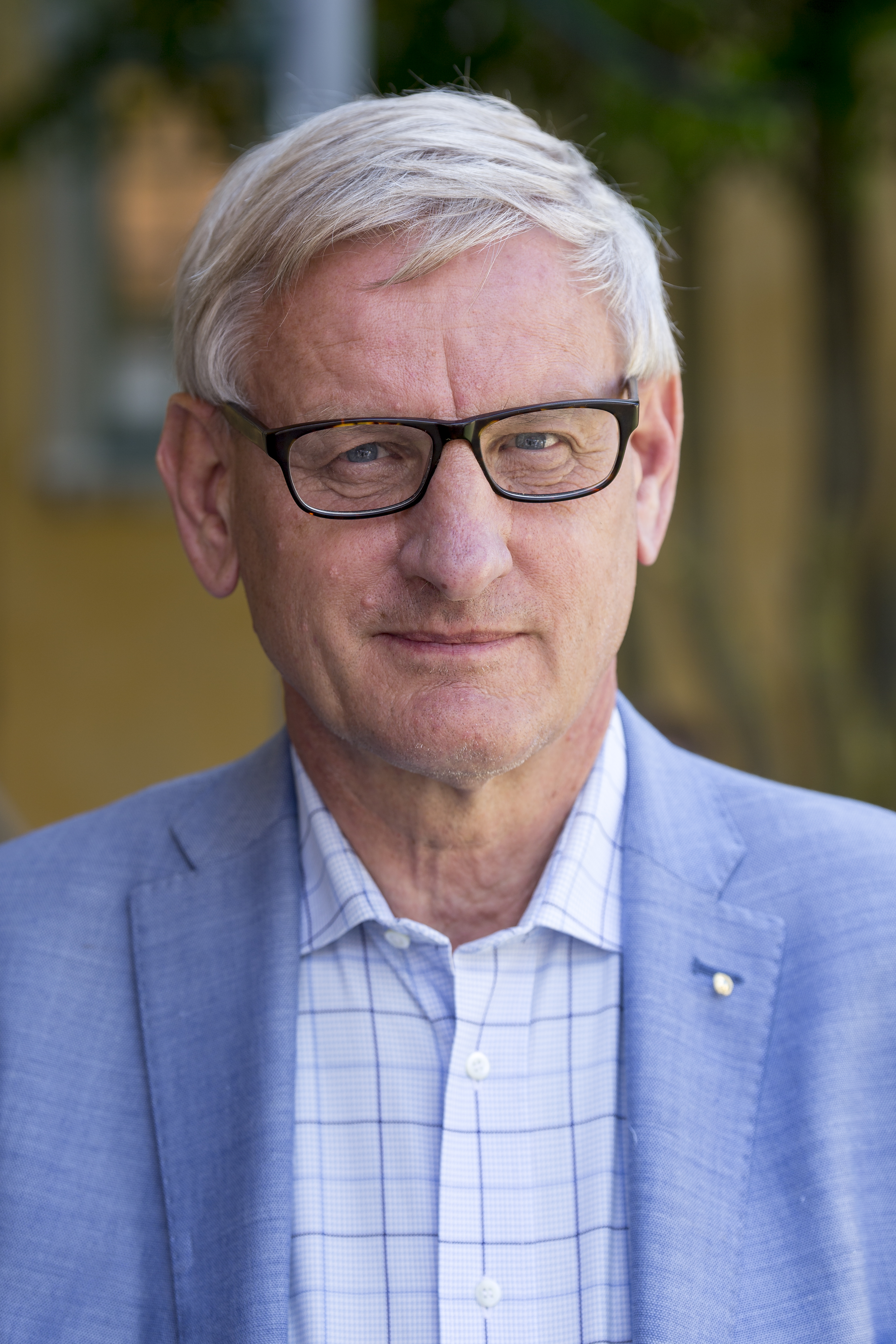
Carl Bildt, leader of the party between 1986 and 1999, was Prime Minister between 1991 and 1994. In addition he was Foreign Minister between 2006 and 2014.

By 1968, the dominance of the Social Democratic Party and 24 years of trailing the liberal People's Party among the opposition bloc had pushed the party to the edge of political relevance. Seeking to shed its conservative image, in 1969, the party changed its name to the Moderate Coalition Party (Swedish: Moderata samlingspartiet, generally just referred to as Moderaterna) or just the Moderate Party.

In 1970, Gösta Bohman was elected leader of the Moderate Party. During his leadership the party continued its gradual movement from nationalist traditionalist conservatism towards internationalist liberal conservatism, calling for Swedish membership in the EEC since the 1960s and in practice adopting most policies affiliated with classical liberalism. It also adopted a much more liberal social outlook, which was seen as a key factor in the foundation of the Christian Democratic Gathering in 1964, a socially conservative party. Bohman proved a successful leader, and helped lead the non-socialist opposition to victory in the 1976 election.

The Moderate Party joined the government under Thorbjörn Fälldin, with Gösta Bohman as Minister of Economy. The non-socialist parties managed to remain in power until 1982 in different constellations, but the election of 1979 again made the Moderate Party become the second most popular after the Social Democrats, a position it held between then and 2022. Gösta Bohman was in 1981 replaced by Ulf Adelsohn.

In 1986, Carl Bildt was elected leader of the party. A son-in-law of Bohman, he managed to lead the party to an election victory in 1991. The Moderate Party led a center-right coalition between 1991 and 1994, with Bildt serving as the first conservative Prime Minister since Arvid Lindman. The cabinet of Carl Bildt did much to reform the Swedish government: they cut taxes, cut public spending, introduced voucher schools, made it possible for counties to privatize health care, liberalised markets for telecommunications and energy, and privatised former publicly owned companies (further deregulations and privatisations were carried out by the following Social Democratic Cabinet of Göran Persson). The negotiations for membership with the European Union were also finalized.

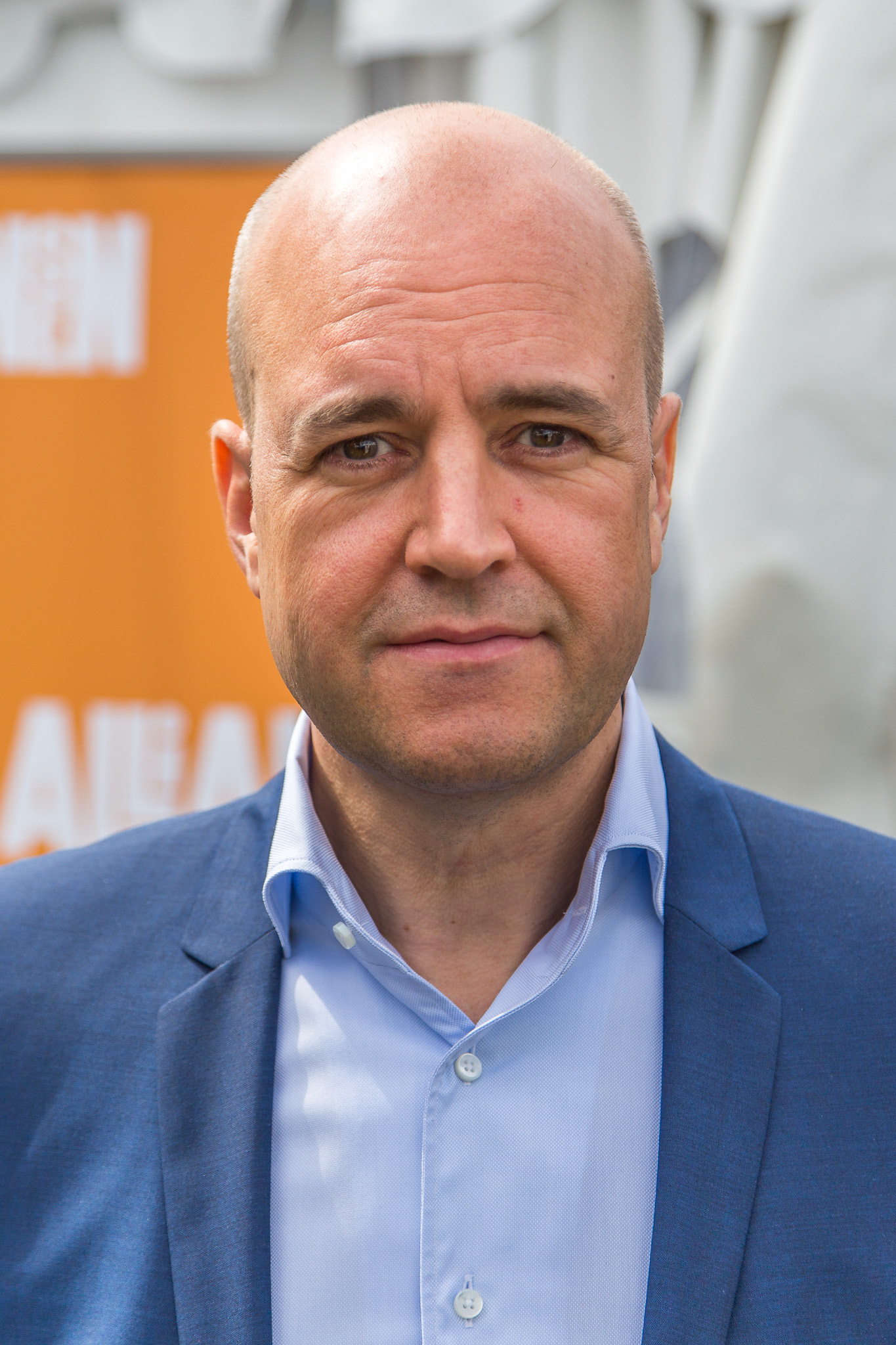
Fredrik Reinfeldt, leader of the party between 2003 and 2015.

The party gained votes in 1994, but the governing coalition lost its majority. While Bildt stayed on as the Moderate Party leader, failing to unite with the Greens, the non-socialist parties failed to return to government after the election in 1998 as well. Bo Lundgren replaced him and led the party in the disastrous general election of 2002, much owed to his alleged neoliberal stances, for which Lundgren continued to receive praise from younger members. Former head of the Moderate Youth Fredrik Reinfeldt was elected as the new party leader in 2003.

Prior to the 2006 general election, the Moderate Party adjusted its position in the political spectrum, moving towards the centre-right. To reflect these changes, the party's unofficial name was altered to The New Moderates (Swedish: De Nya Moderaterna [dɔm ˈnŷːa mʊdɛˈrɑ̌ːtɛɳa]). This has included focus on proactive measures against unemployment, lower taxes combined with reforms to strengthen the Swedish welfare state. The Moderate Party has since 2006 used the slogan "the Swedish Workers' Party", a slogan formerly synonymous with the Social Democrats.

In the 2006 general election, the Moderate Party enjoyed its best result since 1928 with 26.2% of the votes. The Moderate Party had formed the Alliance for Sweden, a political and electoral alliance, along with the Centre Party, the Liberal People's Party and the Christian Democrats prior to this election. After the election, the Alliance for Sweden was able to form a coalition government. Party leader Fredrik Reinfeldt took office as Prime Minister of Sweden on 6 October 2006 along with his cabinet. In the 2010 general election, the Moderate Party performed their best results, since the introduction of universal suffrage in 1919, with 30.1% of the votes. However, the minor parties in the Alliance performed relatively poorly, and the Reinfeldt cabinet continued in office as a minority government.

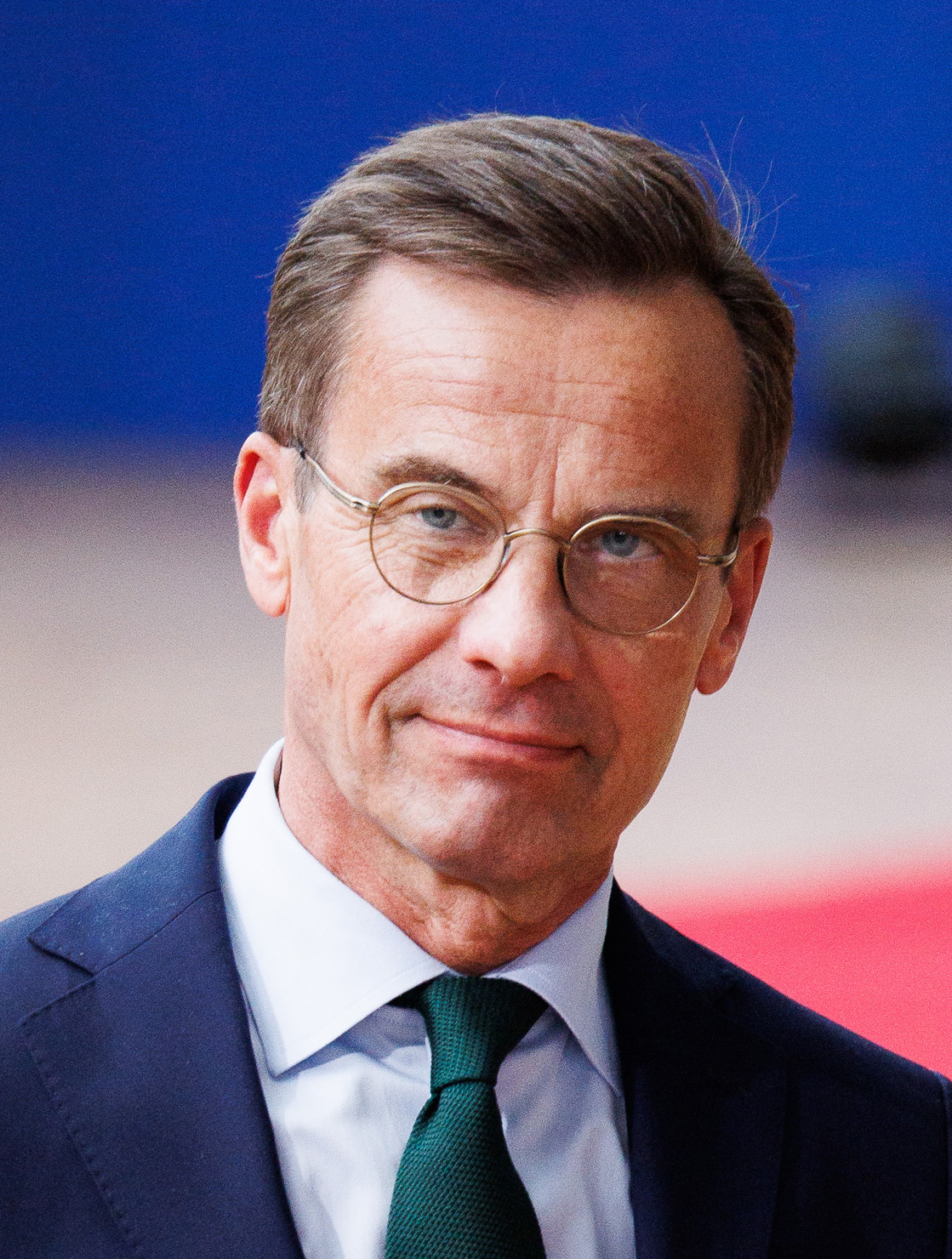
Ulf Kristersson, the current leader of the party since 2017.

He is the longest-serving non–Social Democrat Prime Minister since Erik Gustaf Boström who left office in 1900.

In the 2014 European elections, the Moderate Party came in third place nationally with 13.6% of the vote, returning three MEPs.

In the 2014 general election, the Red-Green coalition outpolled Reinfeldt's incumbent Alliance coalition, prompting its resignation. The Social Democrat Stefan Löfven became Prime Minister on 3 October 2014. The Moderate Party performed reasonably well also in the 2014 election, making Reinfeldt its most successful leader with three of their four best election results since 1932. Anna Kinberg Batra was elected to succeed Reinfeldt as party leader on 10 January 2015. Ulf Kristersson succeeded Kinberg-Batra on 1 October 2017.

The Moderate Party made its worst election result since 2002 in the 2018 general election. Ulf Kristersson announced that the party would "create a new Swedish Model" at the Moderate Party Congress on 5 April 2019 and also that the party would be phasing out the New Moderates name. The party also presented its new logo, the old M logo which was used between 1972 and 2006 was adopted again. The change in logo was seen by analysts as a way to show that the party breaks with Reinfeldt's policies. Ulf Kristersson has also been critical of multiculturalism.

Kristersson held a meeting in December 2019 with Jimmie Åkesson, leader of the Sweden Democrats, and said that he would cooperate with them in parliament. The anti-immigration party had previously been subject to a cordon sanitaire by all other parties, with Kristersson himself ruling out dialogue with them ahead of the 2018 elections. According to Ann-Cathrine Jungar of Södertörn University, this put Sweden in line with several other European countries in which the centre-right and nationalist-right parties cooperate.

In October 2022, the Tidö Agreement was formed, which led to the formation of the Kristersson Cabinet as Sweden's government. On 18 October 2022, Ulf Kristersson became the new Prime Minister of Sweden. The Moderates formed a centre-right coalition with the Christian Democrats and the Liberals, backed by the Sweden Democrats. Soon after his appointment as foreign minister, Tobias Billström of the Moderate Party, announced that Sweden will renounce "feminist foreign policy", implemented by the previous left-wing government.

In 2024, new laws proposed by the Kristersson Cabinet to combat Sweden's criminality crisis took in effect including harder penalties against weapons offences, breach of the permit obligation for explosive goods, arms smuggling and smuggling of explosive goods. Other laws gave increased opportunities to the police to use covert means of coercion to prevent and investigate serious crime, tougher border controls and extended power to security guards. On 20 February 2024, the Kristersson cabinet sent the largest military support package to Ukraine. During Kristerssons Premiership, Sweden ended longstanding neutrality to become a NATO member on 7 March.

== Ideology and political positions ==
The Moderate Party states that its ideology is a mix of liberalism and conservatism, and corresponds to what is called liberal conservatism. As is common in European centre-right and conservative parties, the term liberalism in Sweden refers to the traditional meaning of classical liberalism rather than progressivism or social liberalism in countries such as the United States.

The party supports free markets and personal freedom and has historically been the essential force for privatisation, deregulation, lowering tax rates, and a reduction of the public-sector growth rate. Other issues emphasized by the party are such as actions against violent crime and sex crime, increasing and promoting the value of working, and quality in the educational system. The party supports same-sex marriage in Sweden and Sweden's membership in the European Union. The Moderate Party considers itself as a "green-right" party.

The party campaigned for changing currency to the euro in the 2003 referendum. As of 2013, the party was still in favor of the euro, but it expressed that the issue of a membership of the Economic and Monetary Union of the European Union and the eurozone would not be relevant until the member states have met certain strict requirements set up by the party in regard to budget deficits. In the 2024 EU elections, the Moderate Party proposed making abortion constitutionally protected in Europe.

After Fredrik Reinfeldt became leader, the party slowly moved further towards the political centre and also adopted pragmatic views. The party abandoned several of its old key features such as a proportional income tax and increased military spending. Criticism of the labour laws, its former characteristic which was neoliberal, was changed towards conserving the Swedish model and a careful embracing of balance on the labour market.

With the ascension of Anna Kinberg Batra as party leader, the party adjusted its position in the political spectrum and moved back towards the political right. The party abandoned its previously liberal stance on immigration, notably manifested by Fredrik Reinfeldt's summer speech in 2014 in which he appealed for "open hearts" to meet the expected migrant waves. The party supports border controls and tougher rules for immigrants, including temporary residence permits, stricter requirements for family reunification and cuts in welfare benefits. Swedish values was a recurring subject in Anna Kindberg Batra's speech at the Almedalen Week in 2016, and she said that immigrants should make efforts to learn the Swedish language and take part of Swedish societal orientation, or risk getting reduced benefits and harder to get permanent residence permits. Since 2015, the party has taken up its demand for increased military spending, and has supported the re-introduction of mandatory military service, inactivated in Sweden under Fredrik Reinfeldt in 2010.

The party was in favour of Swedish membership of NATO and supported Sweden's application for membership and later accession to the alliance. The party expressed a wish that a membership was applied for together with Finland which is what happened in May 2022.

== Voter base ==
=== Statistical changes in voter base ===
Socio-economic group and gender of voters	Percentage of which voting for the Moderates						
Groups/Gender	2002	2006	2010	2014	2018	2022	2026
Age 18–21	13	27	23	21	24	26	30
Age 22–30	14	26	23	22	22	24	22
Age 31–64	13	28	31	24	20	19	19
Age 65+	15	25	28	24	17	16	17
Blue-collar workers	7	16	19	13	14	14	15
White-collar workers	21	32	34	26	22	21	22
Businessmen and farmers	25	44	38	35	29	25	23
Male	16	31	32	25	21	21	21
Female	11	23	26	22	19	17	18

== Election results ==
=== Riksdag ===
Election	Leader	Votes	%	Seats	+/–	Status
1911	Gustaf Fredrik Östberg	188,691	31.1 (#2)	65 / 230		Opposition
Mar 1914	Arvid Lindman	286,250	37.7 (#1)	86 / 230	▲21	Opposition
Sep 1914	Arvid Lindman	268,631	36.7 (#1)	86 / 230	Steady	Opposition (1914–1917)
Sep 1914	Arvid Lindman	268,631	36.7 (#1)	86 / 230	Steady	Minority (1917)
1917	Arvid Lindman	182,070	24.7 (#3)	59 / 230	▼27	Opposition
1920	Arvid Lindman	183,019	27.9 (#2)	70 / 230	▲11	Opposition
1921	Arvid Lindman	449,257	25.8 (#2)	62 / 230	▼8	Opposition (1921–1923)
1921	Arvid Lindman	449,257	25.8 (#2)	62 / 230	▼8	Minority (1923–1924)
1924	Arvid Lindman	461,257	26.1 (#2)	65 / 230	▲3	Opposition
1928	Arvid Lindman	692,434	29.4 (#2)	73 / 230	▲8	Minority (1928–1930)
1928	Arvid Lindman	692,434	29.4 (#2)	73 / 230	▲8	Opposition (1930–1932)
1932	Arvid Lindman	576,053	23.1 (#2)	58 / 230	▼15	Opposition
1936	Gösta Bagge	512,781	17.6 (#2)	44 / 230	▼9	Opposition (1936–1939)
1936	Gösta Bagge	512,781	17.6 (#2)	44 / 230	▼9	Coalition (1939–1940)
1940	Gösta Bagge	518,346	18.0 (#2)	42 / 230	▼2	Coalition
1944	Gösta Bagge	488,921	15.8 (#2)	39 / 230	▼3	Coalition (1944–1945)
1944	Gösta Bagge	488,921	15.8 (#2)	39 / 230	▼3	Opposition (1945–1948)
1948	Fritiof Domö	478,779	12.3 (#2)	23 / 230	▼16	Opposition
1952	Jarl Hjalmarson	543,825	14.4 (#3)	31 / 230	▲8	Opposition
1956	Jarl Hjalmarson	663,693	17.1 (#3)	42 / 231	▲11	Opposition
1958	Jarl Hjalmarson	750,332	19.5 (#2)	45 / 233	▲3	Opposition
1960	Jarl Hjalmarson	704,365	16.6 (#3)	39 / 233	▼6	Opposition
1964	Gunnar Heckscher	582,609	13.7 (#4)	33 / 233	▼6	Opposition
1968	Yngve Holmberg	621,031	12.9 (#4)	32 / 233	▼1	Opposition
1970	Yngve Holmberg	573,812	11.5 (#4)	41 / 350	▲9	Opposition
1973	Gösta Bohman	737,584	14.3 (#3)	51 / 350	▲10	Opposition
1976	Gösta Bohman	847,672	15.6 (#3)	55 / 349	▲4	Coalition (1976–1978)
1976	Gösta Bohman	847,672	15.6 (#3)	55 / 349	▲4	Opposition (1978–1979)
1979	Gösta Bohman	1,108,406	20.3 (#2)	73 / 349	▲18	Coalition (1979–1981)
1979	Gösta Bohman	1,108,406	20.3 (#2)	73 / 349	▲18	External support (1981–1982)
1982	Ulf Adelsohn	1,313,337	23.6 (#2)	86 / 349	▲13	Opposition
1985	Ulf Adelsohn	1,187,335	21.3 (#2)	76 / 349	▼10	Opposition
1988	Carl Bildt	983,226	18.3 (#2)	66 / 349	▼10	Opposition
1991	Carl Bildt	1,199,394	21.9 (#2)	80 / 349	▲14	Coalition
1994	Carl Bildt	1,243,253	22.4 (#2)	80 / 349	Steady	Opposition
1998	Carl Bildt	1,204,926	22.9 (#2)	82 / 349	▲2	Opposition
2002	Bo Lundgren	791,660	15.1 (#2)	55 / 349	▼27	Opposition
2006	Fredrik Reinfeldt	1,456,014	26.2 (#2)	97 / 349	▲42	Coalition
2010	Fredrik Reinfeldt	1,791,766	30.1 (#2)	107 / 349	▲10	Coalition
2014	Fredrik Reinfeldt	1,403,630	23.3 (#2)	84 / 349	▼23	Opposition
2018	Ulf Kristersson	1,284,698	19.8 (#2)	70 / 349	▼14	Opposition
2022	Ulf Kristersson	1,237,428	19.10 (#3)	68 / 349	▼2	Coalition
2026	Ulf Kristersson	1,343,448	19.85 (#2)	70 / 349	▲2	

=== European Parliament ===
Election	List leader	Votes	%	Seats	+/–	EP Group
1995	Staffan Burenstam Linder	621,568	23.17 (#2)	5 / 22	New	EPP
1999	Staffan Burenstam Linder	524,755	20.75 (#2)	5 / 22	Steady	EPP-ED
2004	Gunnar Hökmark	458,398	18.25 (#2)	4 / 19	▼1	EPP-ED
2009	Gunnar Hökmark	596,710	18.83 (#2)	4 / 18 4 / 20	Steady	EPP
2014	Gunnar Hökmark	507,488	13.65 (#3)	3 / 20	▼1	EPP
2019	Tomas Tobé	698,770	16.83 (#2)	4 / 20	▲1	EPP
2024	Tomas Tobé	736,079	17.53 (#2)	4 / 21	Steady	EPP

== Organization ==
The party is organised on national, county and municipal level. Currently the party has around 600 local party associations and 26 county or city associations Each county or city association sends delegates to the party congress, which is held every third year. The 200 congress delegates elect a party chairman, two deputy party chairmen, and members of the party board. The party board appoints a party secretary.

In February 2022, the party's reported membership is 49,768 people, the second largest membership count after the Social Democrats.

=== Affiliated organizations ===
The Moderate Party has the following affiliated groups and organizations:

- Moderate Youth League (Moderata ungdomsförbundet, abbr. MUF), organizes students and young members.
- Moderate Seniors (Moderata seniorer [mʊdɛˈrɑ̌ːta sɛnɪˈǒːrɛr]), organizes senior members.
- Moderate Women (Moderatkvinnorna), organizes female members.
- Open Moderates (Öppna moderater Swedish pronunciation: [ˈœ̂pːna mʊdɛˈrɑ̌ːtɛr]), organizes queer members.
- Confederation of Swedish Conservative and Liberal Students (Fria Moderata Studentförbundet) has historic ties to the Moderates, without being a member organisation as such.

== Leaders ==
=== Chairpersons ===
- Gustaf Fredrik Östberg, 1904–1905
- Axel G. Svedelius, 1905–1906
- Hugo Tamm, 1907
- Gustaf Fredrik Östberg, 1908–1912
- Arvid Lindman, 1912–1935
- Gösta Bagge, 1935–1944
- Fritiof Domö, 1944–1950
- Jarl Hjalmarson, 1950–1961
- Gunnar Heckscher, 1961–1965
- Yngve Holmberg, 1965–1970
- Gösta Bohman, 1970–1981
- Ulf Adelsohn, 1981–1986
- Carl Bildt, 1986–1999
- Bo Lundgren, 1999–2003
- Fredrik Reinfeldt, 2003–2015
- Anna Kinberg Batra, 2015–2017
- Ulf Kristersson, 2017–present

=== First deputy party chairpersons (since 1935) ===
- Bernhard Johansson, 1935
- Martin Skoglund, 1935–1956
- Leif Cassel, 1956–1965
- Gösta Bohman, 1965–1970
- Staffan Burenstam Linder, 1970–1981
- Lars Tobisson, 1981–1999
- Chris Heister, 1999–2003
- Gunilla Carlsson, 2003–2015
- Peter Danielsson, 2015–2019
- Elisabeth Svantesson, 2019–present

=== Second deputy party chairpersons (since 1935) ===
- Karl Magnusson, 1935
- Fritiof Domö, 1935–1944
- Jarl Hjalmarson, 1944–1950
- Knut Ewerlöf, 1950–1958
- Gunnar Heckscher, 1958–1961
- Rolf Eliasson, 1961–1965
- Yngve Nilsson, 1965–1970
- Eric Krönmark, 1970–1981
- Ella Tengbom-Velander, 1981–1986
- Ingegerd Troedsson, 1986–1993
- Gun Hellsvik, 1993–1999
- Gunilla Carlsson, 1999–2003
- Kristina Axén Olin, 2003–2009
- Beatrice Ask, 2009–2015
- Elisabeth Svantesson, 2015–2019
- Anna Tenje, 2019–present

=== Party secretaries (since 1949) ===
- Gunnar Svärd, 1949–1961
- Yngve Holmberg, 1961–1965
- Sam Nilsson, 1965–1969
- Bertil af Ugglas, 1969–1974
- Lars Tobisson, 1974–1981
- Georg Danell, 1981–1986
- Per Unckel, 1986–1991
- Gunnar Hökmark, 1991–1999
- Johnny Magnusson, 1999–2003
- Sven Otto Littorin, 2003–2006
- Per Schlingmann, 2006–2010
- Sofia Arkelsten, 2010–2012
- Kent Persson, 2012–2015
- Tomas Tobé, 2015–2017
- Anders Edholm, 2017
- Gunnar Strömmer, 2017–2022
- Karin Enström, 2022–present

=== National ombudsmen (1909–1965) ===
- Gustaf Gustafsson, 1909–1913
- Karl Hammarberg, 1913–1915
- Jonas Folcker, 1915–1920
- Lennart Kolmodin, 1920–1949
- Nils Hellström, 1949–1965

=== Prime Ministers ===
- Christian Lundeberg, 1905
- Arvid Lindman, 1906–1911
- Carl Swartz, 1917
- Ernst Trygger, 1923–1924
- Arvid Lindman, 1928–1930
- Carl Bildt, 1991–1994
- Fredrik Reinfeldt, 2006–2014
- Ulf Kristersson, 2022–present

== See also ==
- Alliance for Sweden
- Elections in Sweden
- Government of Sweden
- Moderate conservatism
- Moderate Women's League of Sweden
- Parliament of Sweden
- Politics of Sweden
- Prime Minister of Sweden
