= Halland County (Riksdag constituency) =

Constituency of the national legislature of Sweden

- Hallands Län
- Constituency for the Riksdag
- Location of Halland County within Sweden
- County: Halland
- Population: 346,087 (2025)
- Electorate: 268,141 (2026)
- Area: 5,714 km^{2} (2026)

Current constituency
- Created: 1970
- Seats: List (Note: Constituency seats only.): 10 (1998–present); 9 (1979–1998); 8 (1973–1979); 7 (1970–1973)
- Member of the Riksdag: List: Andreas Ahlqvist (SD); Christofer Bergenblock (C); Aida Birinxhiku (S); Sara Fladje (M); Arbër Gashi (S); Agnes Hultén (V); Patrik Jönsson (SD); Hanna Netterberg (M); Jennie Nilsson (S); Niclas Nilsson (M); Jan Riise (MP); Hanna Schölander (L); Larry Söder (KD)
- Created from: Halland County

Halland County (Swedish: Hallands Län) is one of the 29 multi-member constituencies of the Riksdag, the national legislature of Sweden. The constituency was established in 1970 when the Riksdag changed from a bicameral legislature to a unicameral legislature. It is conterminous with the county of Halland. The constituency currently elects 10 of the 349 members of the Riksdag using the open party-list proportional representation electoral system. At the 2026 general election it had 268,141 registered electors.

== Electoral system ==
Halland County currently elects 10 of the 349 members of the Riksdag using the open party-list proportional representation electoral system. Constituency seats are allocated using the modified Sainte-Laguë method. Only parties that reach the 4% national threshold and parties that receive at least 12% of the vote in the constituency compete for constituency seats. Supplementary levelling seats may also be allocated at the constituency level to parties that reach the 4% national threshold.

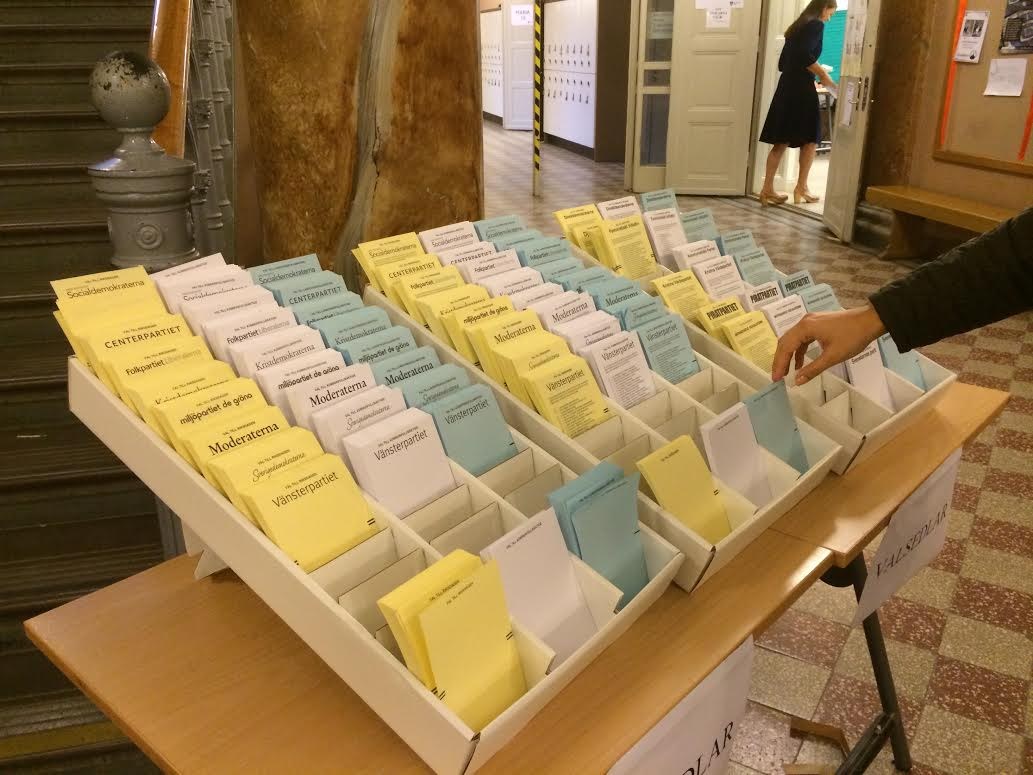
A selection of ballot papers available for voters at the 2014 general election in Stockholm - yellow for the Riksdag, blue for the regional council and white for the municipal council

Prior to 1997 voters could cast any ballot paper they wanted, though it had to contain the name of a party and the name of at least one candidate nominated by that party in the constituency. It was common for parties to hand out ballot papers with their name and list of candidates at the entrance of polling stations. Voters could delete the names of candidates or write-in the names of other candidates but in practice these options weren't used enough by voters to have any significant impact on the results and consequently elections operated as a closed system.

Since 1997, elections in Sweden follow the French model in having separate ballot papers for each party/list in a constituency. There are two ballot papers for each party - a party ballot paper (partivalsedel) with just the name of the party and a name ballot paper (namnvalsedel) with the name of the party and its list of candidates. There are also blank ballot papers (blank valsedel). Voters can initially pick as many ballot papers as they wish and then, in the secrecy of the voting booth, they select a single ballot paper of their choice. If they chose a name ballot paper they have the option of casting a preferential vote for one of their chosen party's candidates. If they chose a blank ballot paper they can write the name of any party including unregistered parties and, optionally, they can write the name of any person as their preferred candidate, even one that does not belong to their chosen party. They then place their chosen ballot paper in an envelope which is placed in the ballot box, discarding all other ballot papers they picked.

Seats won by each party/list in a constituency are allocated to its candidates in order of preference votes (a personal mandate), provided that the candidate has received at least 8% of votes cast for their party in the constituency (5% since January 2011). Any unfilled seats are then allocated to the party's remaining candidates in the order they appear on the party list (a party mandate).

== Election results ==
=== Summary ===
| Election | Left V / VPK | | | Social Democrats S | | | Greens MP | | | Centre C | | | Liberals L / FP / F | | | Moderates M | | | Christian Democrats KD / KDS | | | Sweden Democrats SD | | |
| Election | Votes | % | Seats | Votes | % | Seats | Votes | % | Seats | Votes | % | Seats | Votes | % | Seats | Votes | % | Seats | Votes | % | Seats | Votes | % | Seats |
|---|---|---|---|---|---|---|---|---|---|---|---|---|---|---|---|---|---|---|---|---|---|---|---|---|
| 2026 | 12,095 | 5.25% | 0 | 58,887 | 25.58% | 3 | 10,124 | 4.40% | 0 | 17,369 | 7.54% | 1 | 13,695 | 5.95% | 1 | 53,723 | 23.33% | 2 | 16,228 | 7.05% | 1 | 45,064 | 19.57% | 2 |
| 2022 | 8,963 | 4.04% | 0 | 62,666 | 28.27% | 3 | 7,963 | 3.59% | 0 | 15,590 | 7.03% | 1 | 10,739 | 4.84% | 0 | 49,810 | 22.47% | 2 | 13,328 | 6.01% | 1 | 50,046 | 22.58% | 3 |
| 2018 | 10,498 | 4.84% | 0 | 56,021 | 25.82% | 3 | 7,690 | 3.54% | 0 | 21,960 | 10.12% | 1 | 12,444 | 5.74% | 1 | 49,630 | 22.87% | 2 | 15,415 | 7.10% | 1 | 40,392 | 18.62% | 2 |
| 2014 | 7,785 | 3.77% | 0 | 58,562 | 28.35% | 3 | 12,184 | 5.90% | 1 | 17,367 | 8.41% | 1 | 11,807 | 5.72% | 0 | 57,261 | 27.72% | 3 | 8,988 | 4.35% | 0 | 26,555 | 12.86% | 2 |
| 2010 | 6,904 | 3.53% | 0 | 52,319 | 26.75% | 3 | 11,568 | 5.92% | 1 | 17,178 | 8.78% | 1 | 15,286 | 7.82% | 1 | 67,878 | 34.71% | 4 | 10,994 | 5.62% | 0 | 10,507 | 5.37% | 0 |
| 2006 | 7,110 | 3.96% | 0 | 56,747 | 31.62% | 4 | 7,236 | 4.03% | 0 | 18,589 | 10.36% | 1 | 13,798 | 7.69% | 1 | 53,257 | 29.67% | 3 | 11,987 | 6.68% | 1 | 5,223 | 2.91% | 0 |
| 2002 | 9,995 | 5.94% | 0 | 60,295 | 35.84% | 4 | 6,578 | 3.91% | 0 | 15,908 | 9.46% | 1 | 23,415 | 13.92% | 2 | 29,264 | 17.39% | 2 | 16,720 | 9.94% | 1 | 1,759 | 1.05% | 0 |
| 1998 | 14,042 | 8.56% | 1 | 52,185 | 31.81% | 4 | 6,479 | 3.95% | 0 | 13,748 | 8.38% | 1 | 7,088 | 4.32% | 0 | 40,510 | 24.69% | 3 | 21,038 | 12.82% | 1 | | | |
| 1994 | 7,255 | 4.25% | 0 | 68,924 | 40.37% | 4 | 7,971 | 4.67% | 0 | 21,595 | 12.65% | 1 | 11,371 | 6.66% | 1 | 43,405 | 25.42% | 3 | 6,343 | 3.71% | 0 | | | |
| 1991 | 4,316 | 2.62% | 0 | 52,920 | 32.13% | 3 | 5,299 | 3.22% | 0 | 22,554 | 13.69% | 1 | 15,004 | 9.11% | 1 | 39,975 | 24.27% | 2 | 11,540 | 7.01% | 1 | | | |
| 1988 | 5,434 | 3.45% | 0 | 59,882 | 37.97% | 4 | 9,046 | 5.74% | 0 | 28,225 | 17.89% | 2 | 20,709 | 13.13% | 1 | 30,781 | 19.52% | 2 | 3,307 | 2.10% | 0 | | | |
| 1985 | 4,599 | 2.88% | 0 | 61,291 | 38.43% | 4 | 2,705 | 1.70% | 0 | 29,510 | 18.50% | 2 | 24,877 | 15.60% | 1 | 36,273 | 22.74% | 2 | with C | | | | | |
| 1982 | 5,013 | 3.22% | 0 | 58,925 | 37.80% | 4 | 2,707 | 1.74% | 0 | 37,239 | 23.89% | 2 | 9,181 | 5.89% | 0 | 40,628 | 26.06% | 3 | 2,025 | 1.30% | 0 | | | |
| 1979 | 4,490 | 2.99% | 0 | 53,792 | 35.78% | 3 | | | | 41,436 | 27.56% | 3 | 15,521 | 10.33% | 1 | 33,385 | 22.21% | 2 | 1,229 | 0.82% | 0 | | | |
| 1976 | 3,448 | 2.36% | 0 | 51,762 | 35.36% | 3 | | | | 51,393 | 35.11% | 3 | 15,084 | 10.31% | 1 | 23,325 | 15.94% | 1 | 1,073 | 0.73% | 0 | | | |
| 1973 | 3,533 | 2.63% | 0 | 49,103 | 36.62% | 3 | | | | 50,137 | 37.39% | 3 | 10,220 | 7.62% | 1 | 19,459 | 14.51% | 1 | 1,252 | 0.93% | 0 | | | |
| 1970 | 2,838 | 2.37% | 0 | 45,193 | 37.67% | 3 | | | | 40,237 | 33.54% | 2 | 15,667 | 13.06% | 1 | 14,169 | 11.81% | 1 | 1,177 | 0.98% | 0 | | | |

(Excludes levelling seats. Figures in italics represent alliances/joint lists.)

=== Detailed ===
Party has received at least 4% of the vote nationally and is entitled to compete for constituency seats.

==== 2020s ====
===== 2026 =====
Results of the 2026 general election held on 13 September 2026:

| Party | | Votes per municipality | | | | | | Total votes | % | Seats | | |
| Party | | Falken- berg | Halm- stad | Hylte | Kungs- backa | Laholm | Var- berg | Total votes | % | Con. | Lev. | Tot. |
|---|---|---|---|---|---|---|---|---|---|---|---|---|
| Swedish Social Democratic Party | S | 8,728 | 20,239 | 1,576 | 10,792 | 4,001 | 13,551 | 58,887 | 25.58% | 3 | 0 | 3 |
| Moderate Party | M | 6,456 | 14,548 | 948 | 17,761 | 3,525 | 10,485 | 53,723 | 23.33% | 2 | 1 | 3 |
| Sweden Democrats | SD | 5,965 | 12,802 | 1,539 | 11,510 | 4,630 | 8,618 | 45,064 | 19.57% | 2 | 0 | 2 |
| Centre Party | C | 2,714 | 4,384 | 497 | 4,613 | 1,282 | 3,879 | 17,369 | 7.54% | 1 | 0 | 1 |
| Christian Democrats | KD | 1,969 | 4,451 | 503 | 4,492 | 1,487 | 3,326 | 16,228 | 7.05% | 1 | 0 | 1 |
| Liberals | L | 1,582 | 3,513 | 195 | 4,895 | 848 | 2,662 | 13,695 | 5.95% | 1 | 0 | 1 |
| Left Party | V | 1,862 | 4,869 | 465 | 1,895 | 802 | 2,202 | 12,095 | 5.25% | 0 | 1 | 1 |
| Green Party | MP | 1,338 | 2,964 | 178 | 2,725 | 557 | 2,362 | 10,124 | 4.40% | 0 | 1 | 1 |
| Örebro Party | ÖP | 109 | 310 | 35 | 285 | 48 | 152 | 939 | 0.41% | 0 | 0 | 0 |
| Alternative for Sweden | AfS | 146 | 262 | 27 | 259 | 64 | 159 | 917 | 0.40% | 0 | 0 | 0 |
| Ambition Sweden | AS | 37 | 81 | 10 | 65 | 19 | 81 | 293 | 0.13% | 0 | 0 | 0 |
| Christian Values Party | KrVP | 17 | 69 | 3 | 55 | 17 | 34 | 195 | 0.08% | 0 | 0 | 0 |
| Pirate Party | PP | 26 | 66 | 4 | 43 | 6 | 48 | 193 | 0.08% | 0 | 0 | 0 |
| Citizens' Coalition | MED | 11 | 30 | 2 | 54 | 71 | 24 | 192 | 0.08% | 0 | 0 | 0 |
| Human Rights and Democracy | MoD | 20 | 45 | 1 | 38 | 10 | 27 | 141 | 0.06% | 0 | 0 | 0 |
| Communist Party of Sweden | SKP | 6 | 13 | 0 | 2 | 1 | 19 | 41 | 0.02% | 0 | 0 | 0 |
| Direct Democrats | DD | 5 | 7 | 0 | 8 | 3 | 9 | 32 | 0.01% | 0 | 0 | 0 |
| United Voice | ER | 5 | 14 | 0 | 6 | 3 | 4 | 32 | 0.01% | 0 | 0 | 0 |
| RegleraAI.nu | | 4 | 0 | 0 | 3 | 0 | 1 | 8 | 0.00% | 0 | 0 | 0 |
| Donald Duck Party | | 3 | 2 | 0 | 2 | 0 | 0 | 7 | 0.00% | 0 | 0 | 0 |
| Nuance Party | Pny | 2 | 2 | 0 | 1 | 1 | 1 | 7 | 0.00% | 0 | 0 | 0 |
| Security Party | TRP | 0 | 7 | 0 | 0 | 0 | 0 | 7 | 0.00% | 0 | 0 | 0 |
| The Push Buttons | Kn | 0 | 0 | 1 | 3 | 1 | 2 | 7 | 0.00% | 0 | 0 | 0 |
| Independent Rural Party | LPo | 2 | 2 | 0 | 1 | 1 | 0 | 6 | 0.00% | 0 | 0 | 0 |
| Communist Party | K | 0 | 2 | 0 | 1 | 0 | 1 | 4 | 0.00% | 0 | 0 | 0 |
| Unity | ENH | 2 | 1 | 0 | 0 | 1 | 0 | 4 | 0.00% | 0 | 0 | 0 |
| John Party with Extra Moose | | 0 | 0 | 2 | 1 | 0 | 0 | 3 | 0.00% | 0 | 0 | 0 |
| Nordic Resistance Movement | NMR | 0 | 1 | 0 | 1 | 0 | 1 | 3 | 0.00% | 0 | 0 | 0 |
| United Sweden | | 0 | 1 | 0 | 0 | 0 | 2 | 3 | 0.00% | 0 | 0 | 0 |
| Viking | | 0 | 0 | 0 | 0 | 0 | 3 | 3 | 0.00% | 0 | 0 | 0 |
| Volt Sweden | Volt | 0 | 1 | 0 | 1 | 0 | 1 | 3 | 0.00% | 0 | 0 | 0 |
| A Good Sweden | | 0 | 0 | 0 | 0 | 1 | 1 | 2 | 0.00% | 0 | 0 | 0 |
| Turning Point Party | PV | 0 | 0 | 0 | 0 | 0 | 2 | 2 | 0.00% | 0 | 0 | 0 |
| 99 Black Balloons | | 0 | 0 | 0 | 0 | 0 | 1 | 1 | 0.00% | 0 | 0 | 0 |
| Animal Lovers' Party | | 0 | 0 | 0 | 1 | 0 | 0 | 1 | 0.00% | 0 | 0 | 0 |
| Classical Liberal Party | KLP | 0 | 0 | 0 | 0 | 0 | 1 | 1 | 0.00% | 0 | 0 | 0 |
| Lovely | | 0 | 1 | 0 | 0 | 0 | 0 | 1 | 0.00% | 0 | 0 | 0 |
| People's List | | 1 | 0 | 0 | 0 | 0 | 0 | 1 | 0.00% | 0 | 0 | 0 |
| Secular Humanist Party | | 0 | 0 | 0 | 1 | 0 | 0 | 1 | 0.00% | 0 | 0 | 0 |
| Valid votes | | 31,010 | 68,687 | 5,986 | 59,514 | 17,379 | 47,659 | 230,235 | 100.00% | 10 | 3 | 13 |
| Blank votes | | 343 | 686 | 73 | 376 | 183 | 467 | 2,128 | 0.91% | | | |
| Rejected votes – unregistered parties | | 2 | 8 | 4 | 5 | 2 | 10 | 31 | 0.01% | | | |
| Rejected votes – other | | 41 | 62 | 1 | 42 | 7 | 52 | 205 | 0.09% | | | |
| Total polled | | 31,396 | 69,443 | 6,064 | 59,937 | 17,571 | 48,188 | 232,599 | 86.75% | | | |
| Registered electors | | 36,900 | 82,261 | 7,388 | 66,543 | 20,527 | 54,522 | 268,141 | | | | |
| Turnout | | 85.08% | 84.42% | 82.08% | 90.07% | 85.60% | 88.38% | 86.75% | | | | |

The following candidates were elected:

- Constituency seats (personal mandates) - Christofer Bergenblock (C), 994 votes.
- Constituency seats (party mandates) - Andreas Ahlqvist (SD), 221 votes; Aida Birinxhiku (S), 2,396 votes; Arbër Gashi (S), 1,912 votes; Patrik Jönsson (SD), 2 votes; Hanna Netterberg (M), 809 votes; Jennie Nilsson (S), 1,769 votes; Hanna Schölander (L), 563 votes; Larry Söder (KD), 75 votes; and Helena Storckenfeldt (M), 1,627 votes.
- Levelling seats (personal mandates) - Agnes Hultén (V), 666 votes.
- Levelling seats (party mandates) - Lars Püss (M), 357 votes; and Jan Riise (MP), 222 votes.

Permanent substitutions:

- Lars Püss (M) resigned on 14 October 2026 and was replaced by Niclas Nilsson (M) on 15 October 2026.

===== 2022 =====
Results of the 2022 general election held on 11 September 2022:

| Party | | Votes per municipality | | | | | | Total votes | % | Seats | | |
| Party | | Falken- berg | Halm- stad | Hylte | Kungs- backa | Laholm | Var- berg | Total votes | % | Con. | Lev. | Tot. |
|---|---|---|---|---|---|---|---|---|---|---|---|---|
| Swedish Social Democratic Party | S | 9,547 | 20,708 | 1,828 | 12,191 | 4,250 | 14,142 | 62,666 | 28.27% | 3 | 0 | 3 |
| Sweden Democrats | SD | 6,572 | 14,214 | 1,839 | 12,993 | 5,236 | 9,192 | 50,046 | 22.58% | 3 | 0 | 3 |
| Moderate Party | M | 6,107 | 13,611 | 886 | 16,704 | 3,130 | 9,372 | 49,810 | 22.47% | 2 | 0 | 2 |
| Centre Party | C | 2,568 | 3,996 | 463 | 3,809 | 1,247 | 3,507 | 15,590 | 7.03% | 1 | 0 | 1 |
| Christian Democrats | KD | 1,663 | 3,619 | 432 | 3,705 | 1,227 | 2,682 | 13,328 | 6.01% | 1 | 0 | 1 |
| Liberals | L | 1,216 | 2,883 | 161 | 3,676 | 662 | 2,141 | 10,739 | 4.84% | 0 | 1 | 1 |
| Left Party | V | 1,282 | 3,191 | 220 | 1,752 | 516 | 2,002 | 8,963 | 4.04% | 0 | 0 | 0 |
| Green Party | MP | 1,055 | 2,366 | 152 | 2,175 | 468 | 1,747 | 7,963 | 3.59% | 0 | 1 | 1 |
| Alternative for Sweden | AfS | 81 | 140 | 7 | 165 | 34 | 121 | 548 | 0.25% | 0 | 0 | 0 |
| Citizens' Coalition | MED | 48 | 92 | 10 | 134 | 39 | 105 | 428 | 0.19% | 0 | 0 | 0 |
| Nuance Party | PNy | 29 | 304 | 11 | 16 | 15 | 30 | 405 | 0.18% | 0 | 0 | 0 |
| Human Rights and Democracy | MoD | 36 | 92 | 5 | 84 | 25 | 50 | 292 | 0.13% | 0 | 0 | 0 |
| Christian Values Party | KrVP | 11 | 74 | 1 | 49 | 12 | 29 | 176 | 0.08% | 0 | 0 | 0 |
| The Push Buttons | Kn | 34 | 52 | 8 | 25 | 21 | 34 | 174 | 0.08% | 0 | 0 | 0 |
| Pirate Party | PP | 17 | 41 | 1 | 52 | 8 | 31 | 150 | 0.07% | 0 | 0 | 0 |
| Direct Democrats | DD | 7 | 49 | 2 | 9 | 4 | 9 | 80 | 0.04% | 0 | 0 | 0 |
| Independent Rural Party | LPo | 9 | 22 | 4 | 8 | 20 | 6 | 69 | 0.03% | 0 | 0 | 0 |
| Feminist Initiative | FI | 8 | 24 | 1 | 12 | 2 | 18 | 65 | 0.03% | 0 | 0 | 0 |
| Climate Alliance | KA | 12 | 25 | 1 | 12 | 1 | 8 | 59 | 0.03% | 0 | 0 | 0 |
| Unity | ENH | 11 | 13 | 0 | 9 | 2 | 13 | 48 | 0.02% | 0 | 0 | 0 |
| Communist Party of Sweden | SKP | 1 | 19 | 0 | 3 | 0 | 0 | 23 | 0.01% | 0 | 0 | 0 |
| Nordic Resistance Movement | NMR | 2 | 3 | 2 | 3 | 0 | 1 | 11 | 0.00% | 0 | 0 | 0 |
| Classical Liberal Party | KLP | 0 | 2 | 0 | 3 | 0 | 1 | 6 | 0.00% | 0 | 0 | 0 |
| Hard Line Sweden | | 0 | 2 | 1 | 0 | 2 | 1 | 6 | 0.00% | 0 | 0 | 0 |
| Donald Duck Party | | 1 | 1 | 0 | 1 | 0 | 1 | 4 | 0.00% | 0 | 0 | 0 |
| Socialist Welfare Party | S-V | 1 | 0 | 0 | 1 | 0 | 2 | 4 | 0.00% | 0 | 0 | 0 |
| Basic Income Party | BASIP | 0 | 1 | 0 | 1 | 1 | 0 | 3 | 0.00% | 0 | 0 | 0 |
| Sweden Out of the EU/ Free Justice Party | | 0 | 0 | 0 | 3 | 0 | 0 | 3 | 0.00% | 0 | 0 | 0 |
| Turning Point Party | PV | 0 | 0 | 0 | 2 | 0 | 1 | 3 | 0.00% | 0 | 0 | 0 |
| Volt Sweden | Volt | 0 | 0 | 0 | 2 | 0 | 1 | 3 | 0.00% | 0 | 0 | 0 |
| Freedom Party | | 0 | 1 | 0 | 1 | 0 | 0 | 2 | 0.00% | 0 | 0 | 0 |
| Naturist Party | | 0 | 1 | 0 | 0 | 0 | 1 | 2 | 0.00% | 0 | 0 | 0 |
| Political Shift | | 0 | 0 | 0 | 2 | 0 | 0 | 2 | 0.00% | 0 | 0 | 0 |
| Change Party Revolution | | 0 | 0 | 1 | 0 | 0 | 0 | 1 | 0.00% | 0 | 0 | 0 |
| Evil Chicken Party | OKP | 0 | 0 | 0 | 1 | 0 | 0 | 1 | 0.00% | 0 | 0 | 0 |
| Free Wermland | | 0 | 1 | 0 | 0 | 0 | 0 | 1 | 0.00% | 0 | 0 | 0 |
| Security Party | TRP | 0 | 1 | 0 | 0 | 0 | 0 | 1 | 0.00% | 0 | 0 | 0 |
| Valid votes | | 30,318 | 65,548 | 6,036 | 57,603 | 16,922 | 45,248 | 221,675 | 100.00% | 10 | 2 | 12 |
| Blank votes | | 354 | 723 | 65 | 396 | 209 | 496 | 2,243 | 1.00% | | | |
| Rejected votes – unregistered parties | | 4 | 10 | 3 | 9 | 2 | 13 | 41 | 0.02% | | | |
| Rejected votes – other | | 31 | 70 | 9 | 55 | 9 | 50 | 224 | 0.10% | | | |
| Total polled | | 30,707 | 66,351 | 6,113 | 58,063 | 17,142 | 45,807 | 224,183 | 86.63% | | | |
| Registered electors | | 35,872 | 79,133 | 7,442 | 64,298 | 20,080 | 51,969 | 258,794 | | | | |
| Turnout | | 85.60% | 83.85% | 82.14% | 90.30% | 85.37% | 88.14% | 86.63% | | | | |

The following candidates were elected:

- Constituency seats (personal mandates) - Christofer Bergenblock (C), 868 votes.
- Constituency seats (party mandates) - Aida Birinxhiku (S), 1,465 votes; Sara-Lena Bjälkö (SD), 58 votes; Carita Boulwén (SD), 235 votes; Adnan Dibrani (S), 1,994 votes; Erik Hellsborn (SD), 51 votes; Jennie Nilsson (S), 2,037 votes; Lars Püss (M), 1,213 votes; Larry Söder (KD), 153 votes; and Helena Storckenfeldt (M), 954 votes.
- Levelling seats (party mandates) - Jan Riise (MP), 171 votes; and Cecilia Rönn (L), 494 votes.

Permanent substitutions:

- Adnan Dibrani (S) resigned on 15 July 2024 upon being elected to the European Parliament and was replaced by Arbër Gashi (S) on 16 July 2024.

==== 2010s ====
===== 2018 =====
Results of the 2018 general election held on 9 September 2018:

| Party | | Votes per municipality | | | | | | Total votes | % | Seats | | |
| Party | | Falken- berg | Halm- stad | Hylte | Kungs- backa | Laholm | Var- berg | Total votes | % | Con. | Lev. | Tot. |
|---|---|---|---|---|---|---|---|---|---|---|---|---|
| Swedish Social Democratic Party | S | 8,905 | 19,929 | 1,889 | 9,149 | 3,837 | 12,312 | 56,021 | 25.82% | 3 | 0 | 3 |
| Moderate Party | M | 5,550 | 13,953 | 873 | 17,156 | 3,105 | 8,993 | 49,630 | 22.87% | 2 | 1 | 3 |
| Sweden Democrats | SD | 5,172 | 11,598 | 1,562 | 10,824 | 4,223 | 7,013 | 40,392 | 18.62% | 2 | 0 | 2 |
| Centre Party | C | 3,624 | 5,398 | 706 | 5,464 | 1,930 | 4,838 | 21,960 | 10.12% | 1 | 0 | 1 |
| Christian Democrats | KD | 2,048 | 4,083 | 398 | 4,382 | 1,247 | 3,257 | 15,415 | 7.10% | 1 | 0 | 1 |
| Liberals | L | 1,270 | 3,475 | 200 | 4,255 | 733 | 2,511 | 12,444 | 5.74% | 1 | 0 | 1 |
| Left Party | V | 1,503 | 3,613 | 239 | 2,074 | 643 | 2,426 | 10,498 | 4.84% | 0 | 1 | 1 |
| Green Party | MP | 1,009 | 2,420 | 116 | 2,050 | 492 | 1,603 | 7,690 | 3.54% | 0 | 1 | 1 |
| Feminist Initiative | FI | 121 | 269 | 16 | 157 | 40 | 112 | 715 | 0.33% | 0 | 0 | 0 |
| Alternative for Sweden | AfS | 88 | 150 | 22 | 150 | 40 | 121 | 571 | 0.26% | 0 | 0 | 0 |
| Citizens' Coalition | MED | 38 | 122 | 10 | 118 | 46 | 65 | 399 | 0.18% | 0 | 0 | 0 |
| Animal Party | DjuP | 17 | 104 | 1 | 73 | 2 | 63 | 260 | 0.12% | 0 | 0 | 0 |
| Pirate Party | PP | 29 | 89 | 3 | 55 | 14 | 39 | 229 | 0.11% | 0 | 0 | 0 |
| Direct Democrats | DD | 34 | 88 | 3 | 36 | 7 | 25 | 193 | 0.09% | 0 | 0 | 0 |
| Unity | ENH | 13 | 37 | 2 | 38 | 13 | 36 | 139 | 0.06% | 0 | 0 | 0 |
| Independent Rural Party | LPo | 28 | 21 | 7 | 10 | 23 | 25 | 114 | 0.05% | 0 | 0 | 0 |
| Security Party | TRP | 0 | 71 | 0 | 0 | 38 | 0 | 109 | 0.05% | 0 | 0 | 0 |
| Christian Values Party | KrVP | 7 | 26 | 0 | 27 | 2 | 5 | 67 | 0.03% | 0 | 0 | 0 |
| Nordic Resistance Movement | NMR | 6 | 8 | 4 | 10 | 1 | 11 | 40 | 0.02% | 0 | 0 | 0 |
| Classical Liberal Party | KLP | 3 | 21 | 0 | 5 | 0 | 4 | 33 | 0.02% | 0 | 0 | 0 |
| Basic Income Party | BASIP | 1 | 3 | 0 | 5 | 0 | 4 | 13 | 0.01% | 0 | 0 | 0 |
| Communist Party of Sweden | SKP | 0 | 10 | 0 | 0 | 0 | 0 | 10 | 0.00% | 0 | 0 | 0 |
| Initiative | INI | 1 | 1 | 0 | 1 | 0 | 0 | 3 | 0.00% | 0 | 0 | 0 |
| NY Reform | | 0 | 0 | 0 | 2 | 0 | 0 | 2 | 0.00% | 0 | 0 | 0 |
| Freedom of the Justice Party | | 0 | 0 | 1 | 0 | 0 | 0 | 1 | 0.00% | 0 | 0 | 0 |
| Parties not on the ballot | | 5 | 9 | 4 | 8 | 2 | 6 | 34 | 0.02% | 0 | 0 | 0 |
| Valid votes | | 29,472 | 65,498 | 6,056 | 56,049 | 16,438 | 43,469 | 216,982 | 100.00% | 10 | 3 | 13 |
| Blank votes | | 256 | 575 | 64 | 408 | 177 | 371 | 1,851 | 0.85% | | | |
| Rejected votes – unregistered parties | | 7 | 22 | 3 | 12 | 5 | 9 | 58 | 0.03% | | | |
| Rejected votes – other | | 18 | 23 | 5 | 21 | 5 | 25 | 97 | 0.04% | | | |
| Total polled | | 29,753 | 66,118 | 6,128 | 56,490 | 16,625 | 43,874 | 218,988 | 89.02% | | | |
| Registered electors | | 33,924 | 75,693 | 7,210 | 61,538 | 18,896 | 48,730 | 245,991 | | | | |
| Turnout | | 87.70% | 87.35% | 84.99% | 91.80% | 87.98% | 90.03% | 89.02% | | | | |

The following candidates were elected:

- Constituency seats (personal mandates) - Adnan Dibrani (S), 3,313 votes; Ola Johansson (C), 1,253 votes; and Jörgen Warborn (M), 2,717 votes.
- Constituency seats (party mandates) - Staffan Eklöf (SD), 1 votes; Bengt Eliasson (L), 422 votes; Hans Hoff (S), 1,106 votes; Ulrika Jörgensen (M), 1,142 votes; Jennie Nilsson (S), 1,516 votes; Larry Söder (KD), 482 votes; and Eric Westroth (SD), 4 votes.
- Levelling seats (party mandates) - Elisabeth Falkhaven (MP), 212 votes; Lars Püss (M), 829 votes; and Jon Thorbjörnson (V), 435 votes.

Permanent substitutions:

- Jörgen Warborn (M) resigned on 1 July 2019 upon being elected to the European Parliament and was replaced by Helena Antoni (M) on 2 July 2019.

===== 2014 =====
Results of the 2014 general election held on 14 September 2014:

| Party | | Votes per municipality | | | | | | Total votes | % | Seats | | |
| Party | | Falken- berg | Halm- stad | Hylte | Kungs- backa | Laholm | Var- berg | Total votes | % | Con. | Lev. | Tot. |
|---|---|---|---|---|---|---|---|---|---|---|---|---|
| Swedish Social Democratic Party | S | 9,158 | 21,043 | 2,244 | 8,936 | 4,234 | 12,947 | 58,562 | 28.35% | 3 | 0 | 3 |
| Moderate Party | M | 6,516 | 15,501 | 1,061 | 19,909 | 3,882 | 10,392 | 57,261 | 27.72% | 3 | 0 | 3 |
| Sweden Democrats | SD | 3,666 | 7,824 | 1,135 | 6,281 | 2,867 | 4,782 | 26,555 | 12.86% | 2 | 0 | 2 |
| Centre Party | C | 3,177 | 3,940 | 739 | 3,975 | 1,764 | 3,772 | 17,367 | 8.41% | 1 | 0 | 1 |
| Green Party | MP | 1,615 | 3,926 | 175 | 3,160 | 793 | 2,515 | 12,184 | 5.90% | 1 | 0 | 1 |
| Liberal People's Party | FP | 1,137 | 3,379 | 258 | 4,254 | 612 | 2,167 | 11,807 | 5.72% | 0 | 1 | 1 |
| Christian Democrats | KD | 1,104 | 2,454 | 200 | 2,884 | 607 | 1,739 | 8,988 | 4.35% | 0 | 1 | 1 |
| Left Party | V | 1,094 | 2,816 | 176 | 1,506 | 468 | 1,725 | 7,785 | 3.77% | 0 | 0 | 0 |
| Feminist Initiative | FI | 466 | 1,132 | 66 | 1,042 | 231 | 829 | 3,766 | 1.82% | 0 | 0 | 0 |
| Swedish Senior Citizen Interest Party | SPI | 4 | 522 | 25 | 91 | 97 | 154 | 893 | 0.43% | 0 | 0 | 0 |
| Pirate Party | PP | 75 | 234 | 23 | 150 | 46 | 139 | 667 | 0.32% | 0 | 0 | 0 |
| Unity | ENH | 32 | 51 | 1 | 65 | 22 | 46 | 217 | 0.11% | 0 | 0 | 0 |
| Animal Party | DjuP | 8 | 27 | 3 | 40 | 3 | 32 | 113 | 0.05% | 0 | 0 | 0 |
| Party of the Swedes | SVP | 15 | 36 | 2 | 20 | 1 | 18 | 92 | 0.04% | 0 | 0 | 0 |
| Christian Values Party | KrVP | 3 | 47 | 0 | 17 | 6 | 9 | 82 | 0.04% | 0 | 0 | 0 |
| Independent Rural Party | LPo | 9 | 14 | 9 | 0 | 18 | 5 | 55 | 0.03% | 0 | 0 | 0 |
| Direct Democrats | DD | 3 | 13 | 1 | 7 | 2 | 5 | 31 | 0.02% | 0 | 0 | 0 |
| Classical Liberal Party | KLP | 5 | 6 | 0 | 9 | 0 | 1 | 21 | 0.01% | 0 | 0 | 0 |
| Crossroads | | 0 | 0 | 0 | 11 | 0 | 1 | 12 | 0.01% | 0 | 0 | 0 |
| Health Party | | 0 | 2 | 0 | 8 | 0 | 0 | 10 | 0.00% | 0 | 0 | 0 |
| Communist Party of Sweden | SKP | 1 | 2 | 0 | 0 | 1 | 1 | 5 | 0.00% | 0 | 0 | 0 |
| European Workers Party | EAP | 0 | 3 | 0 | 0 | 1 | 0 | 4 | 0.00% | 0 | 0 | 0 |
| Freedom of the Justice Party | | 0 | 1 | 0 | 0 | 0 | 0 | 1 | 0.00% | 0 | 0 | 0 |
| Peace Democrats | FD | 1 | 0 | 0 | 0 | 0 | 0 | 1 | 0.00% | 0 | 0 | 0 |
| Progressive Party | | 0 | 0 | 0 | 1 | 0 | 0 | 1 | 0.00% | 0 | 0 | 0 |
| Parties not on the ballot | | 10 | 26 | 5 | 20 | 6 | 12 | 79 | 0.04% | 0 | 0 | 0 |
| Valid votes | | 28,099 | 62,999 | 6,123 | 52,386 | 15,661 | 41,291 | 206,559 | 100.00% | 10 | 2 | 12 |
| Blank votes | | 310 | 627 | 45 | 420 | 193 | 444 | 2,039 | 0.98% | | | |
| Rejected votes – other | | 10 | 17 | 1 | 22 | 1 | 9 | 60 | 0.03% | | | |
| Total polled | | 28,419 | 63,643 | 6,169 | 52,828 | 15,855 | 41,744 | 208,658 | 87.52% | | | |
| Registered electors | | 32,975 | 74,040 | 7,322 | 58,477 | 18,430 | 47,158 | 238,402 | | | | |
| Turnout | | 86.18% | 85.96% | 84.25% | 90.34% | 86.03% | 88.52% | 87.52% | | | | |

The following candidates were elected:

- Constituency seats (personal mandates) - Adnan Dibrani (S), 3,226 votes; Ola Johansson (C), 1,163 votes; and Jörgen Warborn (M), 3,163 votes.
- Constituency seats (party mandates) - Jeff Ahl (SD); Agneta Börjesson (MP), 555 votes; Hans Hoff (S), 2,346 votes; Jennie Nilsson (S), 1,649 votes; Jenny Petersson (M), 1,733 votes; Johnny Skalin (SD), 4 votes; and Michael Svensson (M), 1,415 votes.
- Levelling seats (personal mandates) - Göran Hägglund (KD), 1,423 votes.
- Levelling seats (party mandates) - Bengt Eliasson (FP), 565 votes.

Permanent substitutions:

- Göran Hägglund (KD) resigned on 24 April 2015 and was replaced by Larry Söder (KD) on 25 April 2015.

===== 2010 =====
Results of the 2010 general election held on 19 September 2010:

| Party | | Votes per municipality | | | | | | Total votes | % | Seats | | |
| Party | | Falken- berg | Halm- stad | Hylte | Kungs- backa | Laholm | Var- berg | Total votes | % | Con. | Lev. | Tot. |
|---|---|---|---|---|---|---|---|---|---|---|---|---|
| Moderate Party | M | 7,675 | 18,910 | 1,558 | 22,404 | 5,058 | 12,273 | 67,878 | 34.71% | 4 | 0 | 4 |
| Swedish Social Democratic Party | S | 7,964 | 19,424 | 2,108 | 7,797 | 3,822 | 11,204 | 52,319 | 26.75% | 3 | 0 | 3 |
| Centre Party | C | 3,358 | 3,641 | 773 | 3,630 | 1,956 | 3,820 | 17,178 | 8.78% | 1 | 0 | 1 |
| Liberal People's Party | FP | 1,820 | 4,534 | 403 | 4,789 | 869 | 2,871 | 15,286 | 7.82% | 1 | 0 | 1 |
| Green Party | MP | 1,587 | 3,849 | 232 | 2,799 | 690 | 2,411 | 11,568 | 5.92% | 1 | 0 | 1 |
| Christian Democrats | KD | 1,285 | 3,043 | 311 | 3,611 | 710 | 2,034 | 10,994 | 5.62% | 0 | 1 | 1 |
| Sweden Democrats | SD | 1,536 | 3,150 | 423 | 2,241 | 1,321 | 1,836 | 10,507 | 5.37% | 0 | 1 | 1 |
| Left Party | V | 974 | 2,370 | 195 | 1,261 | 476 | 1,628 | 6,904 | 3.53% | 0 | 0 | 0 |
| Swedish Senior Citizen Interest Party | SPI | 173 | 525 | 36 | 153 | 123 | 239 | 1,249 | 0.64% | 0 | 0 | 0 |
| Pirate Party | PP | 128 | 321 | 42 | 293 | 77 | 207 | 1,068 | 0.55% | 0 | 0 | 0 |
| Feminist Initiative | FI | 45 | 104 | 1 | 172 | 17 | 85 | 424 | 0.22% | 0 | 0 | 0 |
| Rural Democrats | | 5 | 16 | 16 | 1 | 4 | 3 | 45 | 0.02% | 0 | 0 | 0 |
| Freedom Party | | 4 | 10 | 0 | 7 | 2 | 2 | 25 | 0.01% | 0 | 0 | 0 |
| Unity | ENH | 2 | 4 | 0 | 6 | 1 | 4 | 17 | 0.01% | 0 | 0 | 0 |
| Classical Liberal Party | KLP | 3 | 5 | 1 | 3 | 0 | 4 | 16 | 0.01% | 0 | 0 | 0 |
| National Democrats | ND | 5 | 3 | 0 | 6 | 1 | 1 | 16 | 0.01% | 0 | 0 | 0 |
| Spirits Party | | 1 | 6 | 0 | 1 | 0 | 1 | 9 | 0.00% | 0 | 0 | 0 |
| Communist Party of Sweden | SKP | 0 | 0 | 0 | 0 | 0 | 3 | 3 | 0.00% | 0 | 0 | 0 |
| Party of the Swedes | SVP | 0 | 2 | 0 | 1 | 0 | 0 | 3 | 0.00% | 0 | 0 | 0 |
| European Workers Party | EAP | 0 | 1 | 0 | 0 | 1 | 0 | 2 | 0.00% | 0 | 0 | 0 |
| Active Democracy | | 0 | 0 | 0 | 0 | 1 | 0 | 1 | 0.00% | 0 | 0 | 0 |
| Nordic Union | | 0 | 0 | 0 | 1 | 0 | 0 | 1 | 0.00% | 0 | 0 | 0 |
| Parties not on the ballot | | 7 | 18 | 4 | 11 | 6 | 6 | 52 | 0.03% | 0 | 0 | 0 |
| Valid votes | | 26,572 | 59,936 | 6,103 | 49,187 | 15,135 | 38,632 | 195,565 | 100.00% | 10 | 2 | 12 |
| Blank votes | | 398 | 725 | 77 | 447 | 192 | 619 | 2,458 | 1.24% | | | |
| Rejected votes – other | | 15 | 19 | 3 | 10 | 4 | 10 | 61 | 0.03% | | | |
| Total polled | | 26,985 | 60,680 | 6,183 | 49,644 | 15,331 | 39,261 | 198,084 | 86.16% | | | |
| Registered electors | | 31,772 | 71,620 | 7,471 | 55,587 | 18,256 | 45,185 | 229,891 | | | | |
| Turnout | | 84.93% | 84.72% | 82.76% | 89.31% | 83.98% | 86.89% | 86.16% | | | | |

The following candidates were elected:

- Constituency seats (party mandates) - Agneta Börjesson (MP), 433 votes; Anne Marie Brodén (M), 1,053 votes; Adnan Dibrani (S), 2,602 votes; Jan Ertsborn (FP), 924 votes; Hans Hoff (S), 2,350 votes; Ola Johansson (C), 1,087 votes; Jennie Nilsson (S), 1,626 votes; Jenny Petersson (M), 926 votes; Michael Svensson (M), 659 votes; and Henrik von Sydow (M), 5,045 votes.
- Levelling seats (party mandates) - Lars Gustafsson (KD), 551 votes; and Mikael Jansson (SD), 108 votes.

==== 2000s ====
===== 2006 =====
Results of the 2006 general election held on 17 September 2006:

| Party | | Votes per municipality | | | | | | Total votes | % | Seats | | |
| Party | | Falken- berg | Halm- stad | Hylte | Kungs- backa | Laholm | Var- berg | Total votes | % | Con. | Lev. | Tot. |
|---|---|---|---|---|---|---|---|---|---|---|---|---|
| Swedish Social Democratic Party | S | 8,590 | 20,045 | 2,294 | 9,584 | 4,076 | 12,158 | 56,747 | 31.62% | 4 | 0 | 4 |
| Moderate Party | M | 6,018 | 15,383 | 1,292 | 17,630 | 3,958 | 8,976 | 53,257 | 29.67% | 3 | 0 | 3 |
| Centre Party | C | 3,632 | 3,755 | 938 | 3,716 | 2,247 | 4,301 | 18,589 | 10.36% | 1 | 0 | 1 |
| Liberal People's Party | FP | 1,649 | 4,327 | 306 | 4,379 | 783 | 2,354 | 13,798 | 7.69% | 1 | 0 | 1 |
| Christian Democrats | KD | 1,396 | 3,398 | 407 | 3,715 | 906 | 2,165 | 11,987 | 6.68% | 1 | 0 | 1 |
| Green Party | MP | 961 | 2,410 | 169 | 1,690 | 487 | 1,519 | 7,236 | 4.03% | 0 | 0 | 0 |
| Left Party | V | 920 | 2,445 | 196 | 1,373 | 523 | 1,653 | 7,110 | 3.96% | 0 | 0 | 0 |
| Sweden Democrats | SD | 733 | 1,439 | 245 | 950 | 867 | 989 | 5,223 | 2.91% | 0 | 0 | 0 |
| Swedish Senior Citizen Interest Party | SPI | 254 | 1,381 | 27 | 525 | 150 | 310 | 2,647 | 1.47% | 0 | 0 | 0 |
| Pirate Party | PP | 80 | 328 | 49 | 270 | 36 | 153 | 916 | 0.51% | 0 | 0 | 0 |
| Feminist Initiative | FI | 80 | 245 | 6 | 272 | 34 | 162 | 799 | 0.45% | 0 | 0 | 0 |
| June List | | 102 | 237 | 28 | 160 | 84 | 155 | 766 | 0.43% | 0 | 0 | 0 |
| Unity | ENH | 8 | 34 | 1 | 17 | 14 | 29 | 103 | 0.06% | 0 | 0 | 0 |
| Health Care Party | Sjvåp | 4 | 35 | 1 | 17 | 3 | 12 | 72 | 0.04% | 0 | 0 | 0 |
| National Democrats | ND | 7 | 8 | 0 | 39 | 3 | 4 | 61 | 0.03% | 0 | 0 | 0 |
| Unique Party | | 22 | 1 | 0 | 0 | 0 | 3 | 26 | 0.01% | 0 | 0 | 0 |
| National Socialist Front | | 7 | 11 | 0 | 3 | 0 | 3 | 24 | 0.01% | 0 | 0 | 0 |
| People's Will | | 5 | 5 | 1 | 4 | 1 | 7 | 23 | 0.01% | 0 | 0 | 0 |
| New Future | NYF | 1 | 7 | 4 | 0 | 3 | 0 | 15 | 0.01% | 0 | 0 | 0 |
| Kvinnokraft | | 0 | 0 | 0 | 1 | 0 | 13 | 14 | 0.01% | 0 | 0 | 0 |
| Miata Partiet | | 6 | 1 | 0 | 0 | 0 | 0 | 7 | 0.00% | 0 | 0 | 0 |
| Socialist Justice Party | RS | 0 | 1 | 0 | 1 | 0 | 4 | 6 | 0.00% | 0 | 0 | 0 |
| Partiet.se | | 2 | 0 | 0 | 0 | 0 | 1 | 3 | 0.00% | 0 | 0 | 0 |
| Classical Liberal Party | KLP | 0 | 0 | 0 | 2 | 0 | 0 | 2 | 0.00% | 0 | 0 | 0 |
| The Communists | KOMM | 2 | 0 | 0 | 0 | 0 | 0 | 2 | 0.00% | 0 | 0 | 0 |
| Freedom of the Justice Party | | 0 | 1 | 0 | 1 | 0 | 0 | 2 | 0.00% | 0 | 0 | 0 |
| Nordic Union | | 0 | 0 | 0 | 0 | 1 | 0 | 1 | 0.00% | 0 | 0 | 0 |
| Rikshushållarna | | 1 | 0 | 0 | 0 | 0 | 0 | 1 | 0.00% | 0 | 0 | 0 |
| Other parties | | 5 | 12 | 1 | 7 | 4 | 4 | 33 | 0.02% | 0 | 0 | 0 |
| Valid votes | | 24,485 | 55,509 | 5,965 | 44,356 | 14,180 | 34,975 | 179,470 | 100.00% | 10 | 0 | 10 |
| Blank votes | | 603 | 1,125 | 112 | 612 | 311 | 925 | 3,688 | 2.01% | | | |
| Rejected votes – other | | 6 | 15 | 4 | 17 | 4 | 12 | 58 | 0.03% | | | |
| Total polled | | 25,094 | 56,649 | 6,081 | 44,985 | 14,495 | 35,912 | 183,216 | 83.50% | | | |
| Registered electors | | 30,566 | 68,826 | 7,589 | 51,800 | 17,817 | 42,814 | 219,412 | | | | |
| Turnout | | 82.10% | 82.31% | 80.13% | 86.84% | 81.35% | 83.88% | 83.50% | | | | |

The following candidates were elected:

- Constituency seats (personal mandates) - Henrik von Sydow (M), 4,365 votes.
- Constituency seats (party mandates) - Jan Andersson (C), 1,079 votes; Anne Marie Brodén (M), 936 votes; Alf Eriksson (S), 1,272 votes; Jan Ertsborn (FP), 818 votes; Lars Gustafsson (KD), 497 votes; Hans Hoff (S), 2,115 votes; Marianne Kierkemann (M), 1,816 votes; Jennie Nilsson (S), 2,039 votes; and Magdalena Streijffert (S), 1,114 votes.

===== 2002 =====
Results of the 2002 general election held on 15 September 2002:

| Party | | Votes per municipality | | | | | | Total votes | % | Seats | | |
| Party | | Falken- berg | Halm- stad | Hylte | Kungs- backa | Laholm | Var- berg | Total votes | % | Con. | Lev. | Tot. |
|---|---|---|---|---|---|---|---|---|---|---|---|---|
| Swedish Social Democratic Party | S | 8,601 | 21,403 | 2,528 | 10,594 | 4,423 | 12,746 | 60,295 | 35.84% | 4 | 0 | 4 |
| Moderate Party | M | 3,357 | 8,562 | 691 | 9,905 | 2,230 | 4,519 | 29,264 | 17.39% | 2 | 0 | 2 |
| Liberal People's Party | FP | 2,637 | 7,266 | 536 | 7,992 | 1,373 | 3,611 | 23,415 | 13.92% | 2 | 0 | 2 |
| Christian Democrats | KD | 2,117 | 4,444 | 521 | 4,876 | 1,536 | 3,226 | 16,720 | 9.94% | 1 | 0 | 1 |
| Centre Party | C | 3,515 | 3,038 | 1,035 | 2,405 | 2,194 | 3,721 | 15,908 | 9.46% | 1 | 0 | 1 |
| Left Party | V | 1,284 | 3,591 | 275 | 1,908 | 642 | 2,295 | 9,995 | 5.94% | 0 | 1 | 1 |
| Green Party | MP | 892 | 2,200 | 174 | 1,521 | 478 | 1,313 | 6,578 | 3.91% | 0 | 0 | 0 |
| Swedish Senior Citizen Interest Party | SPI | 604 | 1,202 | 140 | 676 | 280 | 785 | 3,687 | 2.19% | 0 | 0 | 0 |
| Sweden Democrats | SD | 289 | 346 | 64 | 474 | 165 | 421 | 1,759 | 1.05% | 0 | 0 | 0 |
| New Future | NYF | 1 | 60 | 1 | 11 | 9 | 1 | 83 | 0.05% | 0 | 0 | 0 |
| Unity | ENH | 0 | 5 | 1 | 5 | 0 | 0 | 11 | 0.01% | 0 | 0 | 0 |
| European Workers Party | EAP | 0 | 4 | 0 | 1 | 4 | 0 | 9 | 0.01% | 0 | 0 | 0 |
| Norrbotten Party | NBP | 0 | 1 | 1 | 2 | 2 | 1 | 7 | 0.00% | 0 | 0 | 0 |
| Socialist Party | SOC.P | 1 | 1 | 2 | 2 | 1 | 0 | 7 | 0.00% | 0 | 0 | 0 |
| The Communists | KOMM | 0 | 5 | 0 | 0 | 0 | 0 | 5 | 0.00% | 0 | 0 | 0 |
| Crisis | | 0 | 1 | 0 | 0 | 0 | 0 | 1 | 0.00% | 0 | 0 | 0 |
| Dust-Online | | 0 | 1 | 0 | 0 | 0 | 0 | 1 | 0.00% | 0 | 0 | 0 |
| Socialist Justice Party | RS | 1 | 0 | 0 | 0 | 0 | 0 | 1 | 0.00% | 0 | 0 | 0 |
| Other parties | | 98 | 212 | 14 | 67 | 67 | 43 | 501 | 0.30% | 0 | 0 | 0 |
| Valid votes | | 23,397 | 52,342 | 5,983 | 40,439 | 13,404 | 32,682 | 168,247 | 100.00% | 10 | 1 | 11 |
| Rejected votes | | 405 | 1,028 | 125 | 553 | 289 | 621 | 3,021 | 1.76% | | | |
| Total polled | | 23,802 | 53,370 | 6,108 | 40,992 | 13,693 | 33,303 | 171,268 | 81.51% | | | |
| Registered electors | | 29,307 | 66,542 | 7,660 | 48,603 | 17,313 | 40,703 | 210,128 | | | | |
| Turnout | | 81.22% | 80.20% | 79.74% | 84.34% | 79.09% | 81.82% | 81.51% | | | | |

The following candidates were elected:

- Constituency seats (personal mandates) - Jan Andersson (C), 1,932 votes; Lennart Kollmats (FP), 2,112 votes; and Henrik von Sydow (M), 3,033 votes.
- Constituency seats (party mandates) - Anne Marie Brodén (M), 1,350 votes; Alf Eriksson (S), 2,664 votes; Jan Ertsborn (FP), 1,480 votes; Lars Gustafsson (KD), 935 votes; Hans Hoff (S), 2,109 votes; Pär Axel Sahlberg (S), 1,241 votes; and Majléne Westerlund Panke (S), 1,790 votes.
- Levelling seats (party mandates) - Kjell-Erik Karlsson (V), 780 votes.

==== 1990s ====
===== 1998 =====
Results of the 1998 general election held on 20 September 1998:

| Party | | Votes per municipality | | | | | | Total votes | % | Seats | | |
| Party | | Falken- berg | Halm- stad | Hylte | Kungs- backa | Laholm | Var- berg | Total votes | % | Con. | Lev. | Tot. |
|---|---|---|---|---|---|---|---|---|---|---|---|---|
| Swedish Social Democratic Party | S | 7,793 | 18,117 | 2,418 | 9,302 | 3,892 | 10,663 | 52,185 | 31.81% | 4 | 0 | 4 |
| Moderate Party | M | 4,591 | 12,059 | 984 | 13,198 | 3,173 | 6,505 | 40,510 | 24.69% | 3 | 0 | 3 |
| Christian Democrats | KD | 2,721 | 5,446 | 772 | 6,061 | 1,850 | 4,188 | 21,038 | 12.82% | 1 | 1 | 2 |
| Left Party | V | 1,916 | 4,884 | 467 | 2,663 | 961 | 3,151 | 14,042 | 8.56% | 1 | 0 | 1 |
| Centre Party | C | 3,244 | 2,326 | 842 | 2,060 | 1,801 | 3,475 | 13,748 | 8.38% | 1 | 0 | 1 |
| Liberal People's Party | FP | 839 | 2,250 | 194 | 2,258 | 399 | 1,148 | 7,088 | 4.32% | 0 | 1 | 1 |
| Green Party | MP | 942 | 2,131 | 203 | 1,518 | 561 | 1,124 | 6,479 | 3.95% | 0 | 0 | 0 |
| Other parties | | 1,524 | 3,280 | 242 | 1,498 | 907 | 1,508 | 8,959 | 5.46% | 0 | 0 | 0 |
| Valid votes | | 23,570 | 50,493 | 6,122 | 38,558 | 13,544 | 31,762 | 164,049 | 100.00% | 10 | 2 | 12 |
| Rejected votes | | 579 | 1,413 | 151 | 827 | 414 | 944 | 4,328 | 2.57% | | | |
| Total polled | | 24,149 | 51,906 | 6,273 | 39,385 | 13,958 | 32,706 | 168,377 | 82.83% | | | |
| Registered electors | | 29,037 | 63,814 | 7,769 | 46,056 | 17,215 | 39,398 | 203,289 | | | | |
| Turnout | | 83.17% | 81.34% | 80.74% | 85.52% | 81.08% | 83.01% | 82.83% | | | | |

The following candidates were elected:

- Constituency seats (personal mandates) - Carl Fredrik Graf (M), 4,660 votes; Kjell-Erik Karlsson (V), 1,664 votes; and Rolf Kenneryd (C), 1,828 votes.
- Constituency seats (party mandates) - Jörgen Andersson (S), 3,883 votes; Alf Eriksson (S), 1,090 votes; Lars Gustafsson (KD), 367 votes; Hans Hjortzberg-Nordlund (M), 698 votes; Ingegerd Sahlström (S), 2,622 votes; Liselotte Wågö (M), 1,244 votes; and Majléne Westerlund Panke (S), 384 votes.
- Levelling seats (personal mandates) - Lennart Kollmats (FP), 743 votes.
- Levelling seats (party mandates) - Ester Lindstedt-Staaf (KD), 273 votes.

Permanent substitutions:

- Ingegerd Sahlström (S) resigned on 31 March 1999 and was replaced by Pär Axel Sahlberg (S) on 1 April 1999.
- Jörgen Andersson (S) resigned on 15 October 1999 and was replaced by Hans Hoff (S) on the same day.

===== 1994 =====
Results of the 1994 general election held on 18 September 1994:

| Party | | Votes per municipality | | | | | | Total votes | % | Seats | | |
| Party | | Falken- berg | Halm- stad | Hylte | Kungs- backa | Laholm | Var- berg | Total votes | % | Con. | Lev. | Tot. |
|---|---|---|---|---|---|---|---|---|---|---|---|---|
| Swedish Social Democratic Party | S | 9,953 | 24,785 | 3,125 | 11,874 | 5,076 | 14,111 | 68,924 | 40.37% | 4 | 0 | 4 |
| Moderate Party | M | 5,207 | 13,293 | 1,099 | 13,595 | 3,442 | 6,769 | 43,405 | 25.42% | 3 | 0 | 3 |
| Centre Party | C | 4,632 | 4,017 | 1,412 | 3,464 | 3,081 | 4,989 | 21,595 | 12.65% | 1 | 0 | 1 |
| Liberal People's Party | FP | 1,189 | 3,618 | 357 | 3,700 | 636 | 1,871 | 11,371 | 6.66% | 1 | 0 | 1 |
| Green Party | MP | 1,241 | 2,441 | 268 | 1,817 | 765 | 1,439 | 7,971 | 4.67% | 0 | 0 | 0 |
| Left Party | V | 973 | 2,481 | 188 | 1,377 | 508 | 1,728 | 7,255 | 4.25% | 0 | 0 | 0 |
| Christian Democratic Unity | KDS | 909 | 1,703 | 236 | 1,684 | 522 | 1,289 | 6,343 | 3.71% | 0 | 0 | 0 |
| New Democracy | NyD | 341 | 802 | 86 | 692 | 264 | 353 | 2,538 | 1.49% | 0 | 0 | 0 |
| Other parties | | 270 | 463 | 38 | 170 | 150 | 248 | 1,339 | 0.78% | 0 | 0 | 0 |
| Valid votes | | 24,715 | 53,603 | 6,809 | 38,373 | 14,444 | 32,797 | 170,741 | 100.00% | 9 | 0 | 9 |
| Rejected votes | | 396 | 829 | 90 | 597 | 269 | 702 | 2,883 | 1.66% | | | |
| Total polled | | 25,111 | 54,432 | 6,899 | 38,970 | 14,713 | 33,499 | 173,624 | 88.01% | | | |
| Registered electors | | 28,470 | 62,248 | 7,997 | 43,387 | 17,121 | 38,055 | 197,278 | | | | |
| Turnout | | 88.20% | 87.44% | 86.27% | 89.82% | 85.94% | 88.03% | 88.01% | | | | |

The following candidates were elected: Christer Eirefelt (FP); Alf Eriksson (S); Carl Fredrik Graf (M); Hans Hjortzberg-Nordlund (M); Rolf Kenneryd (C); Pär Axel Sahlberg (S); Ingegerd Sahlström (S); Liselotte Wågö (M); and Majléne Westerlund Panke (S).

===== 1991 =====
Results of the 1991 general election held on 15 September 1991:

| Party | | Votes per municipality | | | | | | Total votes | % | Seats | | |
| Party | | Falken- berg | Halm- stad | Hylte | Kungs- backa | Laholm | Var- berg | Total votes | % | Con. | Lev. | Tot. |
|---|---|---|---|---|---|---|---|---|---|---|---|---|
| Swedish Social Democratic Party | S | 7,906 | 19,847 | 2,579 | 7,873 | 3,854 | 10,861 | 52,920 | 32.13% | 3 | 0 | 3 |
| Moderate Party | M | 4,836 | 12,322 | 1,061 | 12,161 | 3,244 | 6,351 | 39,975 | 24.27% | 2 | 1 | 3 |
| Centre Party | C | 4,949 | 4,306 | 1,488 | 3,359 | 3,144 | 5,308 | 22,554 | 13.69% | 1 | 0 | 1 |
| Liberal People's Party | FP | 1,650 | 4,772 | 445 | 4,655 | 917 | 2,565 | 15,004 | 9.11% | 1 | 0 | 1 |
| New Democracy | NyD | 1,689 | 3,437 | 393 | 3,335 | 1,227 | 2,119 | 12,200 | 7.41% | 1 | 0 | 1 |
| Christian Democratic Unity | KDS | 1,822 | 3,320 | 606 | 2,440 | 932 | 2,420 | 11,540 | 7.01% | 1 | 0 | 1 |
| Green Party | MP | 785 | 1,779 | 239 | 1,076 | 486 | 934 | 5,299 | 3.22% | 0 | 0 | 0 |
| Left Party | V | 592 | 1,651 | 112 | 766 | 264 | 931 | 4,316 | 2.62% | 0 | 0 | 0 |
| Other parties | | 106 | 383 | 29 | 143 | 135 | 115 | 911 | 0.55% | 0 | 0 | 0 |
| Valid votes | | 24,335 | 51,817 | 6,952 | 35,808 | 14,203 | 31,604 | 164,719 | 100.00% | 9 | 1 | 10 |
| Rejected votes | | 503 | 938 | 102 | 505 | 268 | 830 | 3,146 | 1.87% | | | |
| Total polled | | 24,838 | 52,755 | 7,054 | 36,313 | 14,471 | 32,434 | 167,865 | 88.21% | | | |
| Registered electors | | 28,143 | 60,328 | 8,183 | 39,995 | 16,799 | 36,849 | 190,297 | | | | |
| Turnout | | 88.26% | 87.45% | 86.20% | 90.79% | 86.14% | 88.02% | 88.21% | | | | |

The following candidates were elected: Ulla-Britt Åbark (S); Owe Andréasson (S); Bengt Dalström (NyD); Christer Eirefelt (FP); Ivar Franzén (C); Carl Fredrik Graf (M); Nic Grönvall (M); Ingegerd Sahlström (S); Harry Staaf (KDS); and Liselotte Wågö (M).

Permanent substitutions:

- Ulla-Britt Åbark (S) died on 20 May 1992 and was replaced by Alf Eriksson (S) on 22 May 1992.
- Nic Grönvall (M) resigned on 4 October 1993 and was replaced by Hans Hjortzberg-Nordlund (M) on 5 October 1993.

==== 1980s ====
===== 1988 =====
Results of the 1988 general election held on 18 September 1988:

| Party | | Votes per municipality | | | | | | Total votes | % | Seats | | |
| Party | | Falken- berg | Halm- stad | Hylte | Kungs- backa | Laholm | Var- berg | Total votes | % | Con. | Lev. | Tot. |
|---|---|---|---|---|---|---|---|---|---|---|---|---|
| Swedish Social Democratic Party | S | 8,935 | 22,412 | 2,898 | 8,981 | 4,395 | 12,261 | 59,882 | 37.97% | 4 | 0 | 4 |
| Moderate Party | M | 3,738 | 9,858 | 830 | 9,027 | 2,503 | 4,825 | 30,781 | 19.52% | 2 | 0 | 2 |
| Centre Party | C | 5,903 | 5,569 | 1,872 | 4,389 | 4,094 | 6,398 | 28,225 | 17.89% | 2 | 0 | 2 |
| Liberal People's Party | FP | 2,243 | 6,648 | 635 | 6,554 | 1,290 | 3,339 | 20,709 | 13.13% | 1 | 1 | 2 |
| Green Party | MP | 1,322 | 2,930 | 369 | 2,053 | 772 | 1,600 | 9,046 | 5.74% | 0 | 1 | 1 |
| Left Party – Communists | VPK | 671 | 2,206 | 117 | 993 | 336 | 1,111 | 5,434 | 3.45% | 0 | 0 | 0 |
| Christian Democratic Unity | KDS | 491 | 955 | 163 | 603 | 258 | 837 | 3,307 | 2.10% | 0 | 0 | 0 |
| Other parties | | 34 | 152 | 6 | 91 | 18 | 44 | 345 | 0.22% | 0 | 0 | 0 |
| Valid votes | | 23,337 | 50,730 | 6,890 | 32,691 | 13,666 | 30,415 | 157,729 | 100.00% | 9 | 2 | 11 |
| Rejected votes | | 376 | 598 | 70 | 346 | 207 | 532 | 2,129 | 1.33% | | | |
| Total polled | | 23,713 | 51,328 | 6,960 | 33,037 | 13,873 | 30,947 | 159,858 | 87.26% | | | |
| Registered electors | | 27,135 | 59,038 | 8,075 | 37,342 | 16,156 | 35,443 | 183,189 | | | | |
| Turnout | | 87.39% | 86.94% | 86.19% | 88.47% | 85.87% | 87.31% | 87.26% | | | | |

The following candidates were elected: Ulla-Britt Åbark (S); Owe Andréasson (S); Christer Eirefelt (FP); Margareta Fogelberg (FP); Ivar Franzén (C); Nic Grönvall (M); Rolf Kenneryd (C); Hans Leghammar (MP); Sven Eric Lorentzon (M); Ingegerd Sahlström (S); and Lars Svensson (S).

===== 1985 =====
Results of the 1985 general election held on 15 September 1985:

| Party | | Votes per municipality | | | | | | Total votes | % | Seats | | |
| Party | | Falken- berg | Halm- stad | Hylte | Kungs- backa | Laholm | Var- berg | Total votes | % | Con. | Lev. | Tot. |
|---|---|---|---|---|---|---|---|---|---|---|---|---|
| Swedish Social Democratic Party | S | 9,008 | 23,420 | 2,958 | 8,976 | 4,386 | 12,543 | 61,291 | 38.43% | 4 | 0 | 4 |
| Moderate Party | M | 4,664 | 11,679 | 1,059 | 9,874 | 3,222 | 5,775 | 36,273 | 22.74% | 2 | 0 | 2 |
| Centre Party | C | 6,199 | 5,769 | 2,172 | 4,318 | 4,376 | 6,676 | 29,510 | 18.50% | 2 | 0 | 2 |
| Liberal People's Party | FP | 3,081 | 8,035 | 828 | 6,975 | 1,605 | 4,353 | 24,877 | 15.60% | 1 | 1 | 2 |
| Left Party – Communists | VPK | 581 | 1,939 | 104 | 787 | 270 | 918 | 4,599 | 2.88% | 0 | 0 | 0 |
| Green Party | MP | 384 | 1,022 | 116 | 505 | 238 | 440 | 2,705 | 1.70% | 0 | 0 | 0 |
| Other parties | | 34 | 84 | 8 | 54 | 11 | 48 | 239 | 0.15% | 0 | 0 | 0 |
| Valid votes | | 23,951 | 51,948 | 7,245 | 31,489 | 14,108 | 30,753 | 159,494 | 100.00% | 9 | 1 | 10 |
| Rejected votes | | 249 | 464 | 64 | 209 | 139 | 348 | 1,473 | 0.92% | | | |
| Total polled | | 24,200 | 52,412 | 7,309 | 31,698 | 14,247 | 31,101 | 160,967 | 90.91% | | | |
| Registered electors | | 26,615 | 57,812 | 8,106 | 34,431 | 15,893 | 34,199 | 177,056 | | | | |
| Turnout | | 90.93% | 90.66% | 90.17% | 92.06% | 89.64% | 90.94% | 90.91% | | | | |

The following candidates were elected: Owe Andréasson (S); Ingemund Bengtsson (S); Christer Eirefelt (FP); Margareta Fogelberg (FP); Ivar Franzén (C); Nic Grönvall (M); Evert Hedberg (S); Rolf Kenneryd (C); Sven Eric Lorentzon (M); and Lars Svensson (S).

===== 1982 =====
Results of the 1982 general election held on 19 September 1982:

| Party | | Votes per municipality | | | | | | Total votes | % | Seats | | |
| Party | | Falken- berg | Halm- stad | Hylte | Kungs- backa | Laholm | Var- berg | Total votes | % | Con. | Lev. | Tot. |
|---|---|---|---|---|---|---|---|---|---|---|---|---|
| Swedish Social Democratic Party | S | 8,734 | 23,253 | 2,980 | 8,154 | 4,308 | 11,496 | 58,925 | 37.80% | 4 | 0 | 4 |
| Moderate Party | M | 5,383 | 13,364 | 1,303 | 10,732 | 3,310 | 6,536 | 40,628 | 26.06% | 3 | 0 | 3 |
| Centre Party | C | 7,365 | 7,945 | 2,435 | 5,730 | 5,337 | 8,427 | 37,239 | 23.89% | 2 | 0 | 2 |
| Liberal People's Party | FP | 1,153 | 2,913 | 326 | 2,496 | 613 | 1,680 | 9,181 | 5.89% | 0 | 1 | 1 |
| Left Party – Communists | VPK | 557 | 2,210 | 135 | 795 | 306 | 1,010 | 5,013 | 3.22% | 0 | 0 | 0 |
| Green Party | MP | 385 | 1,045 | 112 | 546 | 217 | 402 | 2,707 | 1.74% | 0 | 0 | 0 |
| Christian Democratic Unity | KDS | 331 | 709 | 130 | 284 | 173 | 398 | 2,025 | 1.30% | 0 | 0 | 0 |
| Other parties | | 7 | 58 | 5 | 45 | 6 | 45 | 166 | 0.11% | 0 | 0 | 0 |
| Valid votes | | 23,915 | 51,497 | 7,426 | 28,782 | 14,270 | 29,994 | 155,884 | 100.00% | 9 | 1 | 10 |
| Rejected votes | | 278 | 589 | 77 | 199 | 149 | 391 | 1,683 | 1.07% | | | |
| Total polled | | 24,193 | 52,086 | 7,503 | 28,981 | 14,419 | 30,385 | 157,567 | 92.46% | | | |
| Registered electors | | 26,003 | 56,484 | 8,113 | 31,098 | 15,742 | 32,971 | 170,411 | | | | |
| Turnout | | 93.04% | 92.21% | 92.48% | 93.19% | 91.60% | 92.16% | 92.46% | | | | |

The following candidates were elected: Rolf Andersson (C); Owe Andréasson (S); Ingemund Bengtsson (S); Christer Eirefelt (FP); Ivar Franzén (C); Nic Grönvall (M); Evert Hedberg (S); Sven Eric Lorentzon (M); Lars Svensson (S); and Inger Wickzén (M).

Permanent substitutions:

- Rolf Andersson (C) resigned on 18 February 1984 and was replaced by Ella Johnsson (C) on 19 February 1984.

==== 1970s ====
===== 1979 =====
Results of the 1979 general election held on 16 September 1979:

| Party | | Votes per municipality | | | | | | Total votes | % | Seats | | |
| Party | | Falken- berg | Halm- stad | Hylte | Kungs- backa | Laholm | Var- berg | Total votes | % | Con. | Lev. | Tot. |
|---|---|---|---|---|---|---|---|---|---|---|---|---|
| Swedish Social Democratic Party | S | 8,157 | 21,267 | 2,770 | 7,049 | 3,941 | 10,608 | 53,792 | 35.78% | 3 | 1 | 4 |
| Centre Party | C | 8,111 | 9,323 | 2,697 | 6,430 | 5,852 | 9,023 | 41,436 | 27.56% | 3 | 0 | 3 |
| Moderate Party | M | 4,325 | 11,264 | 1,155 | 8,410 | 2,851 | 5,380 | 33,385 | 22.21% | 2 | 0 | 2 |
| Liberal People's Party | FP | 1,899 | 5,460 | 599 | 3,771 | 1,085 | 2,707 | 15,521 | 10.33% | 1 | 0 | 1 |
| Left Party – Communists | VPK | 487 | 1,979 | 113 | 777 | 274 | 860 | 4,490 | 2.99% | 0 | 0 | 0 |
| Christian Democratic Unity | KDS | 187 | 485 | 56 | 150 | 69 | 282 | 1,229 | 0.82% | 0 | 0 | 0 |
| Communist Party of Sweden | SKP | 1 | 67 | 0 | 3 | 0 | 65 | 136 | 0.09% | 0 | 0 | 0 |
| Other parties | | 21 | 139 | 19 | 56 | 31 | 67 | 333 | 0.22% | 0 | 0 | 0 |
| Valid votes | | 23,188 | 49,984 | 7,409 | 26,646 | 14,103 | 28,992 | 150,322 | 100.00% | 9 | 1 | 10 |
| Rejected votes | | 146 | 331 | 29 | 131 | 81 | 207 | 925 | 0.61% | | | |
| Total polled | | 23,334 | 50,315 | 7,438 | 26,777 | 14,184 | 29,199 | 151,247 | 91.80% | | | |
| Registered electors | | 25,263 | 55,095 | 8,048 | 28,939 | 15,502 | 31,915 | 164,762 | | | | |
| Turnout | | 92.36% | 91.32% | 92.42% | 92.53% | 91.50% | 91.49% | 91.80% | | | | |

The following candidates were elected: Rolf Andersson (C); Owe Andréasson (S); Ingemund Bengtsson (S); Christer Eirefelt (FP); Ivar Franzén (C); Evert Hedberg (S); Ella Johnsson (C); Sven Eric Lorentzon (M); Maja Ohlin (S); and Gunnar Oscarson (M).

Permanent substitutions:

- Maja Ohlin (S) died in April 1981 and was replaced by Lars Svensson (S) on 29 April 1981.

===== 1976 =====
Results of the 1976 general election held on 19 September 1976:

| Party | | Votes per municipality | | | | | | Total votes | % | Seats | | |
| Party | | Falken- berg | Halm- stad | Hylte | Kungs- backa | Laholm | Var- berg | Total votes | % | Con. | Lev. | Tot. |
|---|---|---|---|---|---|---|---|---|---|---|---|---|
| Swedish Social Democratic Party | S | 7,738 | 20,814 | 2,675 | 6,501 | 3,698 | 10,336 | 51,762 | 35.36% | 3 | 0 | 3 |
| Centre Party | C | 9,578 | 12,467 | 3,325 | 8,169 | 7,045 | 10,809 | 51,393 | 35.11% | 3 | 0 | 3 |
| Moderate Party | M | 3,186 | 8,262 | 891 | 5,347 | 1,819 | 3,820 | 23,325 | 15.94% | 1 | 1 | 2 |
| People's Party | F | 1,669 | 5,361 | 496 | 3,861 | 990 | 2,707 | 15,084 | 10.31% | 1 | 0 | 1 |
| Left Party – Communists | VPK | 294 | 1,750 | 99 | 536 | 161 | 608 | 3,448 | 2.36% | 0 | 0 | 0 |
| Christian Democratic Unity | KDS | 169 | 422 | 56 | 117 | 66 | 243 | 1,073 | 0.73% | 0 | 0 | 0 |
| Communist Party of Sweden | SKP | 14 | 88 | 18 | 22 | 11 | 101 | 254 | 0.17% | 0 | 0 | 0 |
| Other parties | | 5 | 3 | 0 | 4 | 2 | 18 | 32 | 0.02% | 0 | 0 | 0 |
| Valid votes | | 22,653 | 49,167 | 7,560 | 24,557 | 13,792 | 28,642 | 146,371 | 100.00% | 8 | 1 | 9 |
| Rejected votes | | 96 | 161 | 19 | 61 | 27 | 91 | 455 | 0.31% | | | |
| Total polled | | 22,749 | 49,328 | 7,579 | 24,618 | 13,819 | 28,733 | 146,826 | 92.78% | | | |
| Registered electors | | 24,399 | 53,613 | 8,053 | 26,283 | 14,933 | 30,979 | 158,260 | | | | |
| Turnout | | 93.24% | 92.01% | 94.11% | 93.67% | 92.54% | 92.75% | 92.78% | | | | |

The following candidates were elected: Alvar Andersson (C); Owe Andréasson (S); Johannes Antonsson (C); Ingemund Bengtsson (S); Karl Bengtsson (F); Evert Hedberg (S); Ella Johnsson (C); Sven Eric Lorentzon (M); and Gunnar Oscarson (M).

Permanent substitutions:

- Johannes Antonsson (C) resigned in February 1979 and was replaced by Axel Kristiansson (C).

===== 1973 =====
Results of the 1973 general election held on 16 September 1973:

| Party | | Votes per municipality | | | | | | Total votes | % | Seats | | |
| Party | | Falken- berg | Halm- stad | Hylte | Kungs- backa | Laholm | Var- berg | Total votes | % | Con. | Lev. | Tot. |
|---|---|---|---|---|---|---|---|---|---|---|---|---|
| Centre Party | C | 9,414 | 12,516 | 3,247 | 7,425 | 6,879 | 10,656 | 50,137 | 37.39% | 3 | 0 | 3 |
| Swedish Social Democratic Party | S | 7,290 | 20,809 | 2,710 | 5,492 | 3,485 | 9,317 | 49,103 | 36.62% | 3 | 0 | 3 |
| Moderate Party | M | 2,809 | 6,694 | 874 | 4,194 | 1,468 | 3,420 | 19,459 | 14.51% | 1 | 0 | 1 |
| People's Party | F | 1,236 | 3,580 | 339 | 2,590 | 635 | 1,840 | 10,220 | 7.62% | 1 | 0 | 1 |
| Left Party – Communists | VPK | 328 | 1,945 | 82 | 439 | 151 | 588 | 3,533 | 2.63% | 0 | 0 | 0 |
| Christian Democratic Unity | KDS | 147 | 536 | 62 | 150 | 82 | 275 | 1,252 | 0.93% | 0 | 0 | 0 |
| Communist Party of Sweden | SKP | 19 | 62 | 23 | 24 | 7 | 86 | 221 | 0.16% | 0 | 0 | 0 |
| Communist League Marxist–Leninists (the revolutionaries) | KFML(r) | 9 | 67 | 1 | 18 | 6 | 32 | 133 | 0.10% | 0 | 0 | 0 |
| Other parties | | 0 | 3 | 0 | 6 | 1 | 18 | 28 | 0.02% | 0 | 0 | 0 |
| Valid votes | | 21,252 | 46,212 | 7,338 | 20,338 | 12,714 | 26,232 | 134,086 | 100.00% | 8 | 0 | 8 |
| Rejected votes | | 43 | 66 | 4 | 38 | 27 | 31 | 209 | 0.16% | | | |
| Total polled | | 21,295 | 46,278 | 7,342 | 20,376 | 12,741 | 26,263 | 134,295 | 91.93% | | | |
| Registered electors | | 22,908 | 50,657 | 7,815 | 21,987 | 13,856 | 28,857 | 146,080 | | | | |
| Turnout | | 92.96% | 91.36% | 93.95% | 92.67% | 91.95% | 91.01% | 91.93% | | | | |

The following candidates were elected: Alvar Andersson (C); Owe Andréasson (S); Johannes Antonsson (C); Ingemund Bengtsson (S); Karl Bengtsson (F); Evert Hedberg (S); Axel Kristiansson (C); and Gunnar Oscarson (M).

===== 1970 =====
Results of the 1970 general election held on 20 September 1970:

| Party | | Votes per municipality | | | | | | | | | | | | | | | | | | | | | Total votes | % | Seats | | |
| Party | | Elds- berga | Enslöv | Falken- berg | Fjärås | Get- inge | Halm- stad | Harp- linge | His- hult | Knäred | Kungs- backa | Kvi- bille | Laholm | Löfta- dalen | Onsala | Oskar- ström | Rännes- löv | Sön- drum | Torup | Var- berg | Veinge | Postal votes | Total votes | % | Con. | Lev. | Tot. |
|---|---|---|---|---|---|---|---|---|---|---|---|---|---|---|---|---|---|---|---|---|---|---|---|---|---|---|---|
| Swedish Social Democratic Party | S | 641 | 572 | 6,647 | 611 | 689 | 13,259 | 800 | 153 | 249 | 2,850 | 513 | 1,815 | 342 | 410 | 1,177 | 385 | 1,447 | 991 | 7,465 | 570 | 3,607 | 45,193 | 37.67% | 3 | 0 | 3 |
| Centre Party | C | 663 | 720 | 8,285 | 1,232 | 469 | 4,450 | 749 | 515 | 734 | 2,171 | 741 | 2,681 | 1,200 | 368 | 217 | 1,135 | 572 | 957 | 8,538 | 953 | 2,887 | 40,237 | 33.54% | 2 | 1 | 3 |
| People's Party | F | 172 | 97 | 1,566 | 169 | 62 | 3,822 | 112 | 74 | 88 | 2,300 | 89 | 536 | 170 | 348 | 167 | 52 | 561 | 217 | 2,271 | 94 | 2,700 | 15,667 | 13.06% | 1 | 0 | 1 |
| Moderate Party | M | 142 | 72 | 1,846 | 204 | 141 | 2,276 | 190 | 111 | 116 | 1,199 | 140 | 511 | 149 | 223 | 87 | 157 | 644 | 252 | 2,449 | 140 | 3,120 | 14,169 | 11.81% | 1 | 0 | 1 |
| Left Party – Communists | VPK | 16 | 39 | 266 | 18 | 13 | 1,306 | 45 | 17 | 4 | 174 | 17 | 47 | 3 | 34 | 82 | 6 | 85 | 13 | 403 | 23 | 227 | 2,838 | 2.37% | 0 | 0 | 0 |
| Christian Democratic Unity | KDS | 5 | 21 | 124 | 13 | 3 | 316 | 15 | 22 | 28 | 55 | 18 | 33 | 44 | 5 | 20 | 9 | 23 | 19 | 216 | 8 | 180 | 1,177 | 0.98% | 0 | 0 | 0 |
| Communist League Marxists-Leninists | KFML | 5 | 3 | 22 | 0 | 1 | 79 | 4 | 0 | 1 | 21 | 1 | 8 | 1 | 0 | 2 | 2 | 3 | 3 | 31 | 1 | 72 | 260 | 0.22% | 0 | 0 | 0 |
| Other parties | | 0 | 0 | 0 | 0 | 0 | 1 | 0 | 0 | 0 | 0 | 0 | 0 | 0 | 0 | 0 | 0 | 0 | 0 | 402 | 0 | 28 | 431 | 0.36% | 0 | 0 | 0 |
| Valid votes | | 1,644 | 1,524 | 18,756 | 2,247 | 1,378 | 25,509 | 1,915 | 892 | 1,220 | 8,770 | 1,519 | 5,631 | 1,909 | 1,388 | 1,752 | 1,746 | 3,335 | 2,452 | 21,775 | 1,789 | 12,821 | 119,972 | 100.00% | 7 | 1 | 8 |
| Rejected votes | | 2 | 1 | 20 | 2 | 1 | 25 | 4 | 0 | 2 | 13 | 0 | 12 | 2 | 1 | 0 | 3 | 11 | 4 | 20 | 1 | 56 | 180 | 0.15% | | | |
| Total polled exc. postal votes | | 1,646 | 1,525 | 18,776 | 2,249 | 1,379 | 25,534 | 1,919 | 892 | 1,222 | 8,783 | 1,519 | 5,643 | 1,911 | 1,389 | 1,752 | 1,749 | 3,346 | 2,456 | 21,795 | 1,790 | 12,877 | 120,152 | | | | |
| Postal votes | | 160 | 104 | 1,939 | 164 | 133 | 3,902 | 232 | 50 | 78 | 1,561 | 119 | 615 | 196 | 241 | 215 | 112 | 625 | 173 | 2,029 | 197 | -12,877 | -32 | | | | |
| Total polled inc. postal votes | | 1,806 | 1,629 | 20,715 | 2,413 | 1,512 | 29,436 | 2,151 | 942 | 1,300 | 10,344 | 1,638 | 6,258 | 2,107 | 1,630 | 1,967 | 1,861 | 3,971 | 2,629 | 23,824 | 1,987 | 0 | 120,120 | 89.89% | | | |
| Registered electors | | 1,954 | 1,765 | 22,644 | 2,651 | 1,593 | 33,488 | 2,349 | 1,084 | 1,470 | 11,561 | 1,789 | 6,990 | 2,300 | 1,803 | 2,148 | 2,046 | 4,193 | 2,877 | 26,734 | 2,187 | | 133,626 | | | | |
| Turnout | | 92.43% | 92.29% | 91.48% | 91.02% | 94.92% | 87.90% | 91.57% | 86.90% | 88.44% | 89.47% | 91.56% | 89.53% | 91.61% | 90.40% | 91.57% | 90.96% | 94.71% | 91.38% | 89.11% | 90.86% | | 89.89% | | | | |

The following candidates were elected: Alvar Andersson (C); Johannes Antonsson (C); Ingemund Bengtsson (S); Karl Bengtsson (F); Gösta Josefsson (S); Axel Kristiansson (C); Eric Mossberger (S); and Gunnar Oscarson (M).

Permanent substitutions:

- Gösta Josefsson (S) resigned in October 1973 and was replaced by Lars Svensson (S).
