= Sara Fladje =

Swedish politician (born 2005)

Member of the Riksdag
- Incumbent
- Assumed office 15 October 2026
- Preceded by: Helena Storckenfeldt
- Constituency: Halland County

Personal details
- Born: 8 October 2005 (age 21)
- Party: Moderate Party

Sara Elisabeth Fladje (born 8 October 2005) is a Swedish politician serving as a member of the Riksdag since 2026. She has served as chairwoman of the Moderate Youth League in Halland County since 2024.

== See also ==
- List of members of the Riksdag, 2026–2030
