= Arbër Gashi =

Swedish politician (born 1994)

Arbër Gashi S

Member of the Riksdag
- Incumbent
- Assumed office 16 July 2024
- Constituency: Halland County

Personal details
- Born: 28 December 1994 (age 31) Hultsfred, Sweden
- Party: Swedish Social Democratic Party

Arbër Gashi (born 28 December 1994) is a Swedish politician of the Swedish Social Democratic Party who has served as a member of the Riksdag for Halland County since July 2024.

== Political career ==
Before entering national politics, Gashi was active in local government in Halmstad Municipality, where he served as chairman of the committee for children and youth.

He became a member of the Riksdag on 16 July 2024 during the 2022–2026 parliamentary term, succeeding Adnan Dibrani.

== Parliamentary work ==
In the Riksdag, Gashi serves as a member of parliament and as a deputy member of the Committee on Social Insurance.

In 2025, he raised concerns regarding working conditions in the recycling sector following media reports and submitted a formal question to the Swedish government.
