= Cecilia Rönn =

Swedish politician (born 1980)

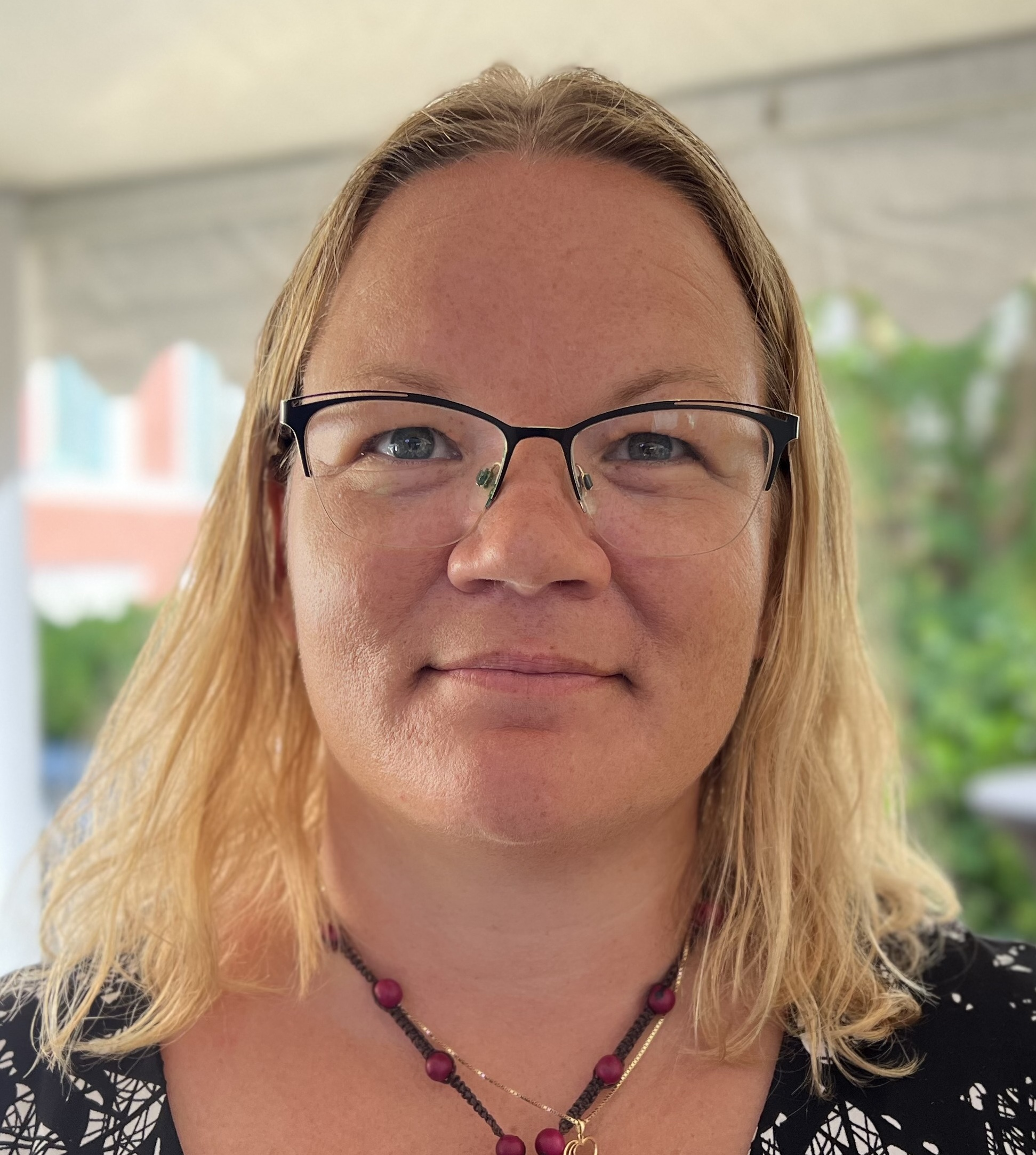
- Rönn in 2023

Member of the Riksdag
- Incumbent
- Assumed office 26 September 2022
- Constituency: Halland County

Personal details
- Born: 6 May 1980 (age 46) Varberg, Sweden
- Party: Liberal Party
- Spouse: Ulf-Björn Rönn
- Children: 3
- Education: Halmstad University

Cecilia Rönn (born 6 May 1980) is a Swedish politician. A member of the Liberals, she was elected to the Riksdag in 2022. She represents the constituency of Halland County.

She was born in Varberg and trained as a mechanical engineer at Halmstad University. She worked in business for several years before becoming involved in politics, joining the Liberal Party in 2015. She worked with the school board and municipal council. She also became chairwoman of the Liberal Party in Varberg before her election to the Riksdag. Her term began on 26 September 2022. She is a member of the Finance Committee and her party's spokesperson for economic policy.

== Early life and education ==
She was born on 6 May 1980 in Varberg, Sweden. She was raised in Väröbacka and Veddige. She studied mechanical engineering at Halmstad University.

== Career ==
=== Business ===
In 2006, she began working as an engineer at Carlsberg in Falkenberg. In 2010, she became a site manager at Ramlösa in Helsingborg, also a part of the Carlsberg Group.

=== Politics ===
She joined the Liberals in 2015, and became involved in the school board and municipal council. She advocated for the Liberal Party to cooperate with the Sweden Democrats on certain issues. In 2020, she was chairwoman of both the Liberal Party in Varberg and the board of Varberg Energi. In the latter role, she spoke out about sexual harassment issues that had been raised by the workers there; she also advocated for an investigation of the problems.

In 2021, she was ranked first in the list of potential Riksdag candidates by the Liberals in Halland County. She was ultimately elected, and her term began on 26 September 2022.

In August 2023, she took over from Carl B. Hamilton as her party's economic policy spokesperson. She also joined the Finance Committee as a full member.

== Personal life ==
She is married to Ulf-Björn Rönn. They have three children.
