= Agneta Börjesson =

Swedish politician (born 1957)

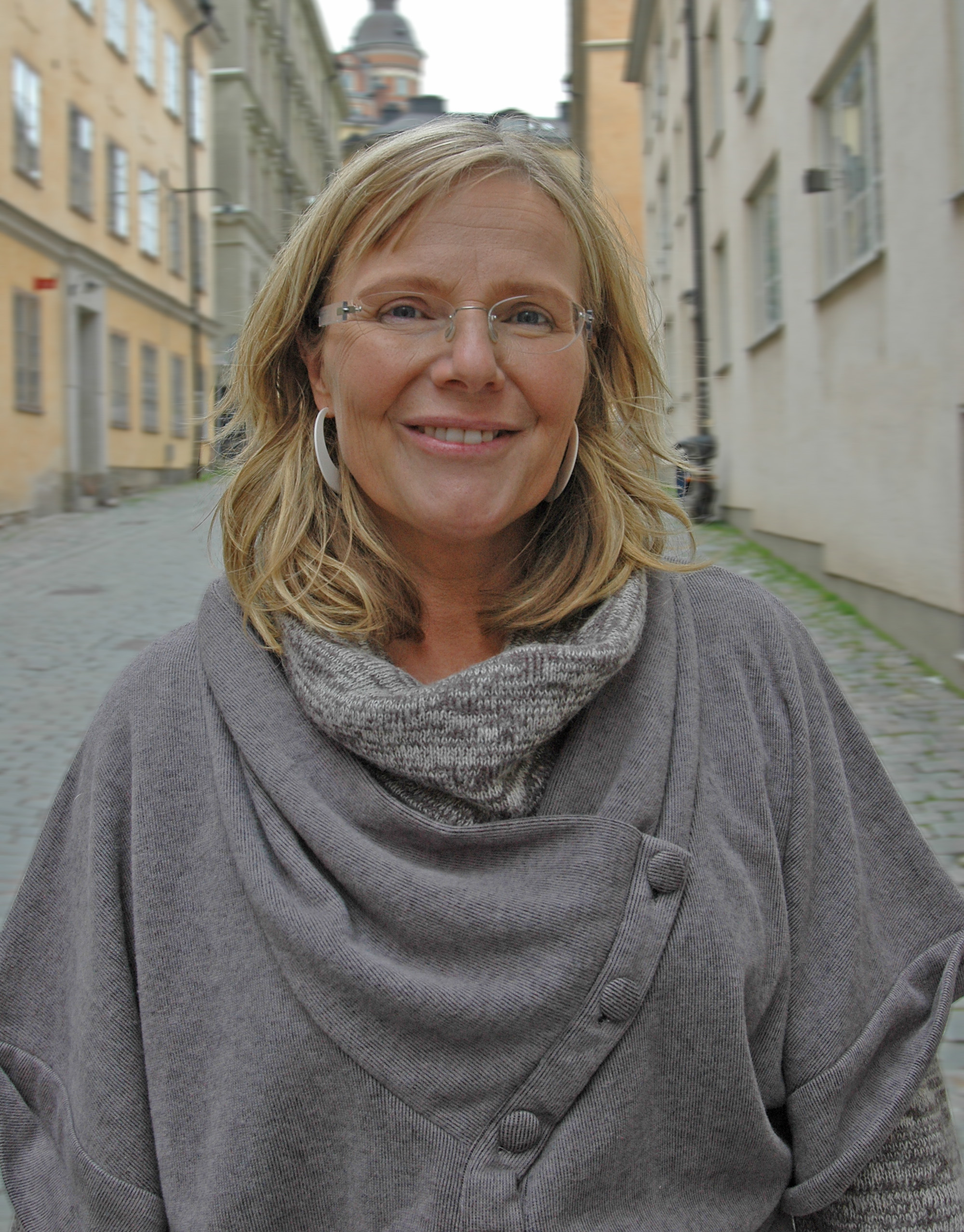
- Börjesson in September 2008

Member of the Riksdag
- In office 4 October 2010 – 24 September 2018
- Constituency: Halland County

Personal details
- Born: Karin Agneta Börjesson; 1957 (age 68–69)
- Party: Green Party

Karin Agneta Börjesson (born 1957) is a Swedish politician and former member of the Riksdag, the national legislature. A member of the Green Party, she represented Halland County between October 2010 and September 2018.

Börjesson is the daughter of merchants Karl-Gustav Börjesson and Ingeborg Börjesson (née Johansson). She was educated in Kungsbacka and Mira Costa High School in the USA. She studied at the Chalmers University of Technology and the Nordic College for Public Health. She was head of planning at the Ministry of Finance from 2002 to 2006 during the second Persson government. She was a member of the municipal council in Kungsbacka Municipality between 1988 and 1991; in 2002; and between 2006 and 2007. She was a member of the county council in Halland County from 1988 to 1998 and of the regional council in Halland County from 2006 to 2007. She was secretary of the Green Party from 2007 to 2011.
