= Hanna Netterberg =

Swedish politician (born 1983)

Member of the Riksdag
- Incumbent
- Assumed office 28 September 2026
- Constituency: Halland County

Personal details
- Born: 25 July 1983 (age 43) Sweden
- Party: Moderate Party

Hanna Netterberg (born 25 July 1983) is a Swedish politician from the Moderate Party. She has been a member of the Riksdag since 2026, elected for the Halland County constituency.

== Biography ==
Netterberg was born in Derome and lives in Varberg. She has post-secondary education and has held political positions for the Moderate Party since 2014.

In the 2026 Swedish general election, Netterberg was elected as a member of parliament for the Moderate Party in the Halland County constituency. She took office as a member of parliament on 28 September 2026.

== See also ==
- List of members of the Riksdag, 2026–2030
