= Majléne Westerlund Panke =

Swedish politician (born 1946)

Member of the Riksdag
- In office 3 October 1994 – 2 October 2006
- Constituency: Halland County

Personal details
- Born: 1946 (age 79–80)
- Party: Social Democratic Party

Majléne Lilian Westerlund Panke (born 1946) is a Swedish politician and former member of the Riksdag, the national legislature. A member of the Social Democratic Party, she represented Halland County between October 1994 and October 2006.
