= Bengt Eliasson =

Swedish politician (born 1961)

Bengt Eliasson L
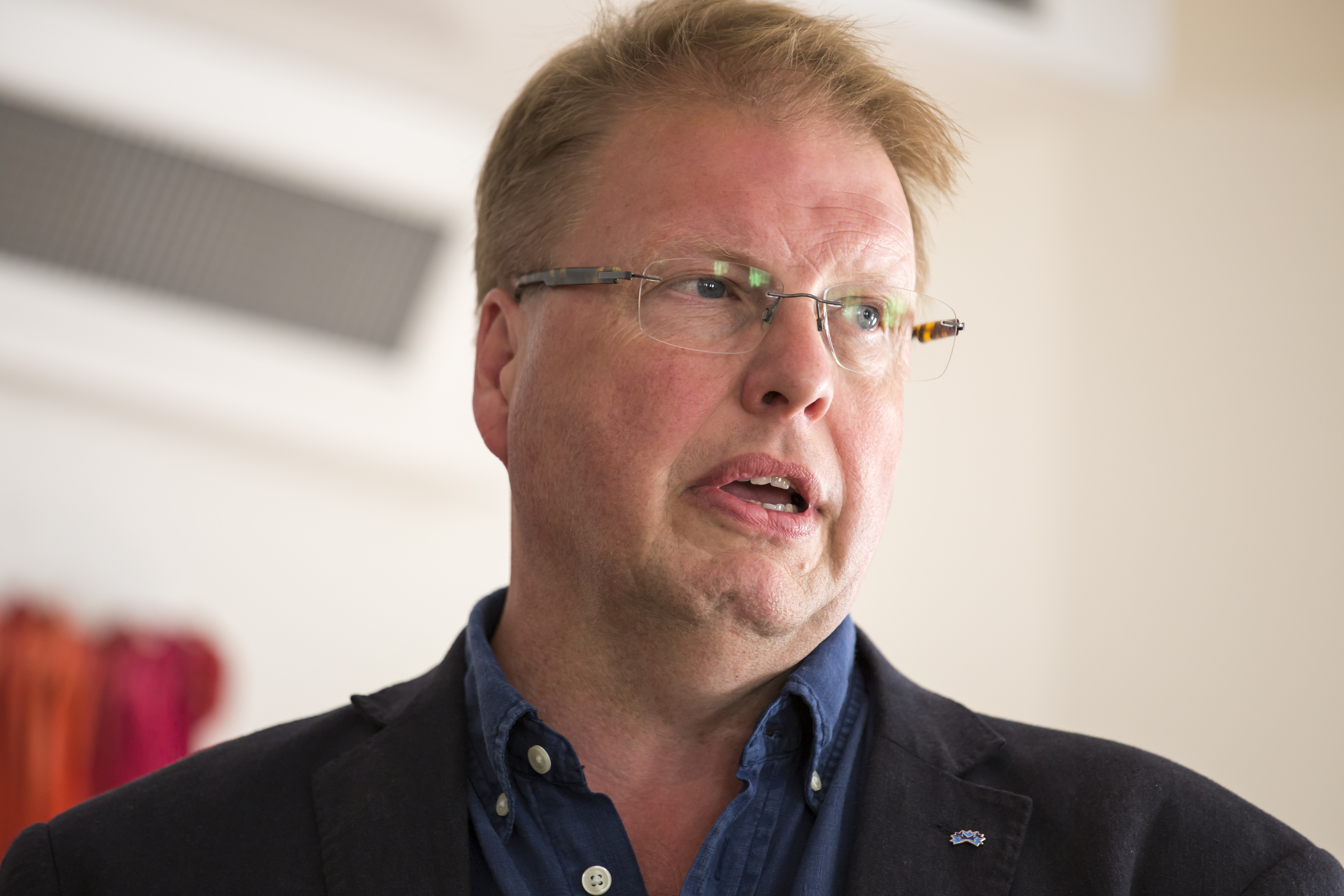

Member of the Swedish Parliament for Halland County
- Incumbent
- Assumed office 29 September 2014

Personal details
- Born: 7 August 1961 (age 64)
- Party: Liberals
- Parents: Filip Eliasson; Maj-Britt Eliasson
- Profession: Politician, community assistant
- Website: liberalerna.se/bengt-eliasson/

Bengt Eliasson (born 7 August 1961) is a Swedish politician and member of the Riksdag for the Liberals. He joined the Riksdag after the 2014 general elections, he currently holds seat number 41 in the Riksdag for the constituency of Halland County.

He was a candidate to the Riksdag on Halland County's ballot at place number 1 out of 22 during the 2014 general election. During the 2018 general election he campaigned at place number 1 for the Riksdag.

According to a statement given to Sveriges Television his three most important reasons for being involved in politics are 'The forgotten Sweden', equality, and infrastructure and communication.

He is a member of the Committee on Social Insurance since October 2019, he had previously served in other committees such as the Committee on Cultural Affairs from 2014 until 2018, and the Committee on the Constitution for a short period between September 2018 until October 2019.

Eliasson is also the spokesperson for the Liberals on Lagen om stöd och service till vissa funktionshindrade (LSS).
