= Alvar Andersson =

Swedish politician (1913–1999)

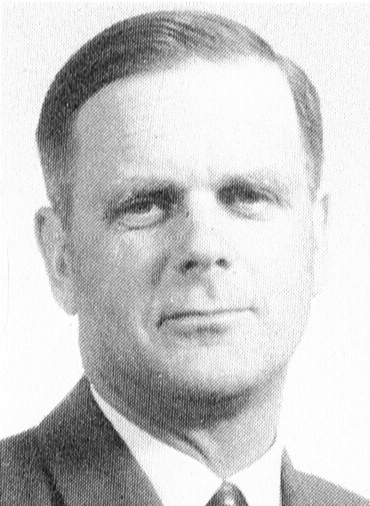
Martin Alvar Andersson 1913 SPA (cropped).jpg

Alvar Andersson (27 October 1913 – 11 December 1999) was a Swedish politician, born in Knäred. He was a member of the Centre Party, and a member of both houses of the bicameral Swedish parliament. He represented Kronoberg County and Halland County in the upper house from 1954 to 1958, and Halland County in the lower house between 1961 and 1964, and again in 1969–1970. When the bicameral parliament had been abolished, he was a member of the unicameral parliament from 1971 to 1979.

Andersson was also active in the Federation of Swedish Farmers, and in the temperance movement IOGT-NTO.
