= Carita Boulwén =

Swedish politician (born 1967)

Carita Veronica Boulwén

Member of the Riksdag
- Incumbent
- Assumed office 11 September 2022
- Constituency: Halland County

Personal details
- Born: 6 September 1967 (age 58) Sweden
- Party: Sweden Democrats
- Occupation: Nurse, politician

Carita Veronica Boulwén (born 6 September 1967) is a Swedish politician of the Sweden Democrats party who has been a member of the Riksdag since 2022, representing the Halland County constituency.

Boulwén has served as the spokeswoman for the Sweden Democrats in Kungsbacka, where she is also municipal councilor and the group leader for the party on the municipal council. She has also served as the local spokeswoman on health, child care and labour issues for the SD. For the 2022 Swedish general election, she was selected by the SD to lead the party's Riksdag candidate list for the Halland county electoral list. During her campaign, she focused on increasing the number of police officers in the constituency and for changes to Sweden's asylum system, arguing that aid should be given to refugee camps near war zones rather than maintaining a policy which she claims encourages refugees to migrate illegally to Sweden. Boulwén was subsequently elected to the Riksdag, taking a seat from the Left Party.

== See also ==
- List of members of the Riksdag, 2022–2026
