= Agnes Hultén =

Swedish politician (born 1973)

Member of the Riksdag
- Incumbent
- Assumed office 28 September 2026
- Constituency: Halland County

Personal details
- Born: 1973 (age 52–53) Gothenburg, Sweden
- Party: Left Party

Agnes Nathalie Hultén (born 1973) is a Swedish politician and Member of the Riksdag. A member of the Left Party, she has represented Halland County since September 2026.

Hultén was born in 1973 in Gothenburg. She grew up in the Linnéstaden area of the city and was educated at Schillerska gymnasiet. She has a Bachelor of Arts degree in sociology and is a qualified intranet developer. She moved to Varberg in 1997. She worked for AstraZeneca for 14 years.

Hultén joined the Left Party in 1998. She is a member of the municipal council in Varberg and the regional council (regionfullmäktige) in Halland. She was elected to the Riksdag at the 2026 general election.

Hultén is married and has two children. She lives in Sibbarp.
