= Jan Riise =

Swedish politician (born 1957)

Member of the Riksdag
- Incumbent
- Assumed office 26 September 2022
- Constituency: Halland County

Personal details
- Born: 1957 (age 68–69)
- Party: Green Party

Jan Riise (born 1957) is a Swedish politician. He was elected a Member of the Riksdag in September 2022. He represents the constituency of Halland County. He is affiliated with the Green Party.
