= Ola Johansson (politician) =

Politician and Member of the parliament of Sweden

Ola Johansson C
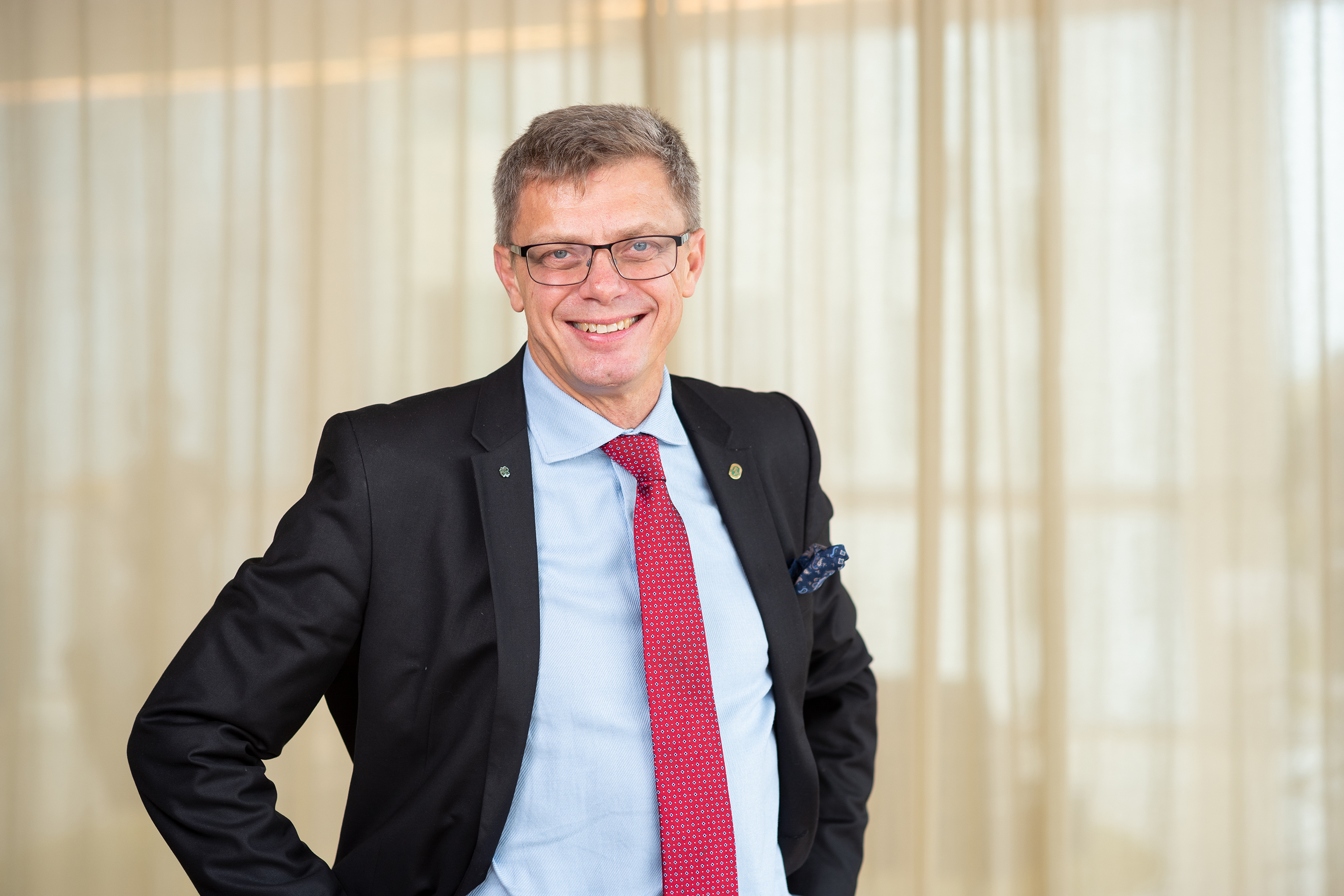

Member of the Swedish Parliament for Halland County
- Incumbent
- Assumed office 4 October 2010

Personal details
- Born: 1964 (age 61–62)
- Party: Center Party
- Education: Berghs School of Communication
- Profession: Politician, Key Account Manager
- Website: centerpartiet.se

Ola Johansson (born 1960) is a Swedish politician and member of the Riksdag for the Centre Party. He joined the Riksdag after the 2010 general elections, he is currently taking up seat number 39 in the Riksdag for the constituency of Halland County.

He was a candidate to the Riksdag on Halland County's ballot at place number 1 out of 30 on and at place number 1 for the Municipal Council election. During the 2014 general election he campaigned at place number 1 for the Riksdag but switched to place number 4 for the municipal council election. During the 2018 general election he still campaigned at place number 1 on the county's ballot, but he did not appear to run for the municipal council election of that year. His political interests are priority those regarding policies regarding housing, along with climate change, and the environment. He is a member of the Committee on Civil Affairs, he also serves as an alternate in the Riksdag for the Committee on the Labour Market and the Committee on Health and Welfare.

Johansson is also the spokesperson for Bygdegårdarnas riksförbund
