= Hans Hoff (politician) =

Swedish politician (born 1963)

Hans Hoff S

Member of the Swedish Parliament for Halland County
- Incumbent
- Assumed office 15 October 1999

Personal details
- Born: 9 April 1963 (age 63) Sweden
- Party: Social Democratic Party
- Profession: Politician

Hans Harald Hoff (born 9 April 1963) is a Swedish Social Democratic Party politician who has been a member of the Riksdag since 1999. He takes up seat number 17 for Halland County's constituency.

== Career ==
Hoff joined the Riksdag in 1995 after one of his colleagues left the Riksdag, he served from 1995 to 1998. He was later elected in 1999 as a member of the Social Democratic Party, serving the constituency of Halland County. He has been a member of several Parliamentary committees in the Riksdag notably, the Committee for Finance between 2002 and 2010, the Constitutional Committee (2010-2014), and the Health and Welfare Committee (2014-2018). He is currently a member of the Committee for Culture since assuming office in 2018. He is also a member for the Inter-Parliamentary Union of the Riksdag and serves a board member for the Bank of Sweden Tercentenary Foundation.

Hoff has also been an industry-worker and ombudsman for the Social Democrats in Halland. He is a board member and serves as president for the local faction of the Social Democrats in Halland.
