= Pär Axel Sahlberg =

Swedish politician (born 1954)

Member of the Riksdag
- In office 1 April 1999 – 2 October 2006
- Preceded by: Ingegerd Sahlström
- Constituency: Halland County
- In office 3 October 1994 – 5 October 1998
- Constituency: Halland County

Personal details
- Born: 1954 (age 71–72)
- Party: Social Democratic Party

Pär Axel Sahlberg (born 1954) is a Swedish pastor, politician and former member of the Riksdag, the national legislature. A member of the Social Democratic Party, he represented Halland County between October 1994 and October 1998; and between April 1999 and October 2006. He was also a substitute member of the Riksdag twice: October 1998 (for Jörgen Andersson); and between October 1998 and March 1999 (for Ingegerd Sahlström). He is a Methodist pastor and was president of the International League of Religious Socialists.
