= Erik Hellsborn =

Swedish politician (born 1984)

Member of the Riksdag
- Incumbent
- Assumed office 26 September 2022
- Constituency: Halland County

Personal details
- Born: 1984 (age 41–42)
- Party: Sweden Democrats

Erik Hellsborn (born 1984) is a Swedish politician affiliated with the Sweden Democrats. He was elected as Member of the Riksdag in September 2022 representing the Halland County constituency.
