= Christofer Bergenblock =

Swedish politician (born 1974)

Member of the Riksdag
- Incumbent
- Assumed office 26 September 2022
- Constituency: Halland County

Personal details
- Born: 1974 (age 51–52)
- Party: Centre Party

Christofer Bergenblock (born 1974) is a Swedish politician. Since September 2022, he serves as Member of the Riksdag representing the constituency of Halland County. He is affiliated with the Centre Party.
