= Larry Söder =

Swedish politician (born 1969)

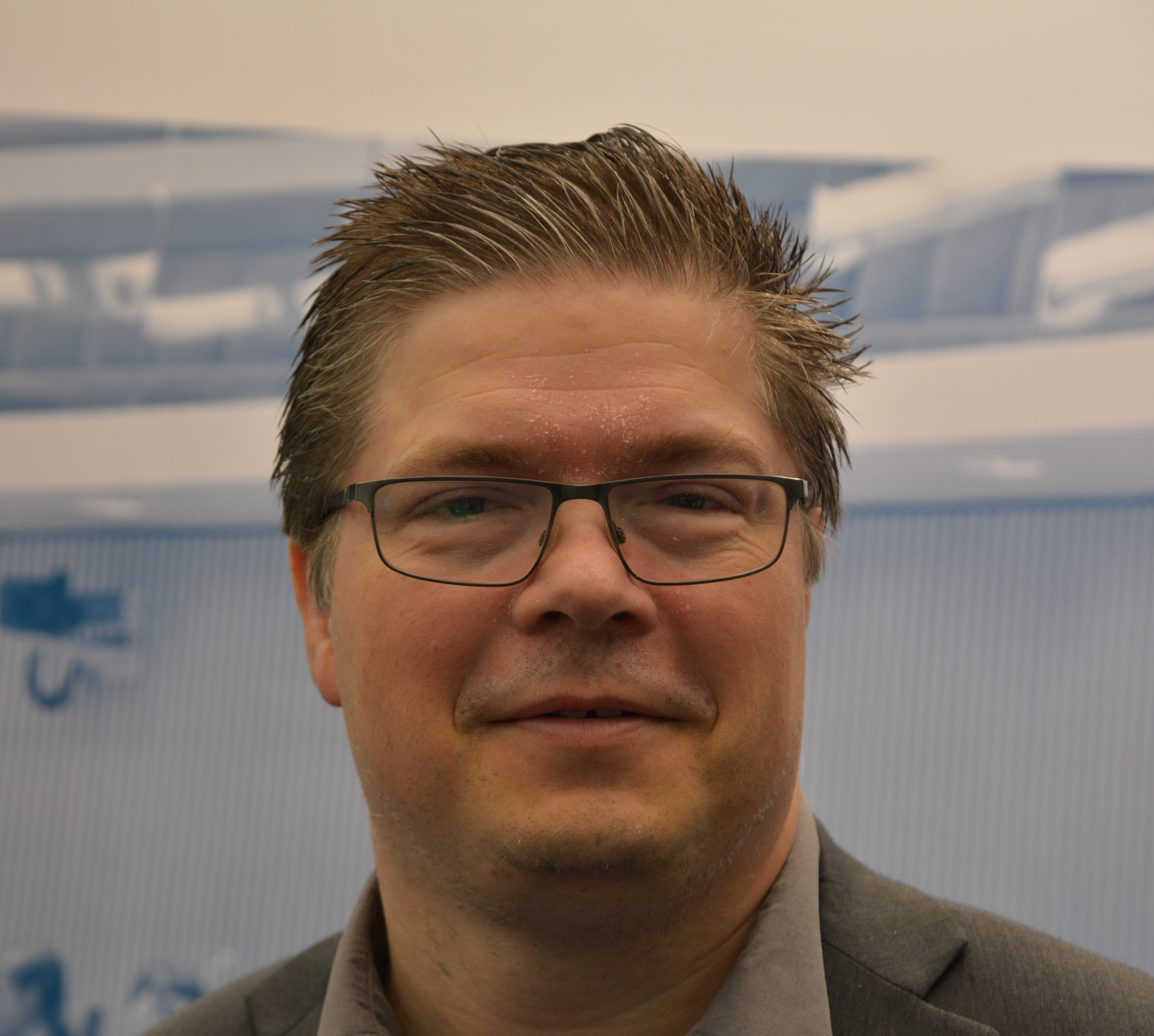

Member of the Riksdag
- Incumbent
- Assumed office 2014
- Constituency: Halland County

Personal details
- Born: 1969 (age 56–57)
- Party: Christian Democrats

Larry Inge Söder (born 1969) is a Swedish politician from the Christian Democrats. He has been a member of the Riksdag since 2014. He was re-elected in 2018 and 2022. He is a member of the Committee on Civil Affairs. He is the housing policy spokesperson for his party.

== See also ==
- List of members of the Riksdag, 2014–2018
- List of members of the Riksdag, 2018–2022
- List of members of the Riksdag, 2022–2026
