= Aida Birinxhiku =

Swedish politician (born 1999)

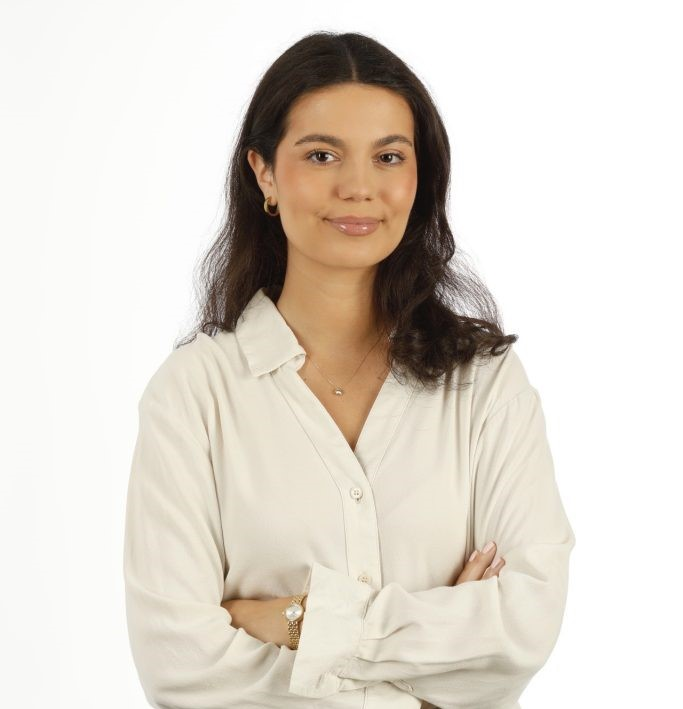

Member of the Riksdag
- Incumbent
- Assumed office 26 September 2022
- Constituency: Halland County

Personal details
- Born: 1999 (age 26–27)
- Party: Social Democrats
- Education: Lund University

Aida Birinxhiku (born 1999) is a Swedish politician. She was elected as Member of the Riksdag in September 2022. She represents the constituency of Halland County. She is affiliated with the Social Democrats.

She was born to Albanian parents who came to Sweden in 1998 and graduated from Lund University after completing her high school studies.
