= Hanna Schölander =

Swedish politician (born 1979)

Member of the Riksdag
- Incumbent
- Assumed office 28 September 2026
- Constituency: Halland County

Personal details
- Born: 1979 (age 46–47)
- Party: Liberals
- Education: Linköping University

Hanna Schölander (born 1979) is a Swedish politician of the Liberals. She has been a member of the Riksdag, representing Halland County, since September 2026.

== Education and professional career ==
Schölander studied social and cultural analysis at Linköping University. She has worked in management positions in the voluntary sector and in municipal administration. In 2022, she was head of "Ung i Kungsbacka", a municipal youth service. Her professional background includes work with adult education associations and organisations for children and young people.

== Political career ==
Schölander served on Kungsbacka Municipal Council from November 2002 to July 2005, representing the Liberal People's Party, subsequently renamed the Liberals.

In Region Halland, she has served as a member of the regional assembly, deputy leader of the Liberal group and chair of the committee responsible for culture and education. She has also chaired the cultural committee of Regionsamverkan Sydsverige, a cooperation body for southern Swedish regions, and served on the advisory council of the National Library of Sweden.

Schölander stood in the 2024 European Parliament election in Sweden, occupying 39th place on the Liberals' candidate list.

In April 2026, she became the lead candidate on the Liberals' parliamentary list in Halland County ahead of the 2026 Swedish general election. She was elected to the Riksdag and took office on 28 September 2026. On 6 October 2026, she became a member of the Committee on Health and Welfare and a substitute member of the Committee on Cultural Affairs.
