= Lars Gustafsson (politician) =

Swedish politician (born 1951)

Lars Gustafsson (born 1951) is a Swedish Christian democratic politician and member of the Riksdag since 1998.
