= Lennart Kollmats =

Swedish politician (1943–2025)

Lennart Kollmats (10 May 1943 – 1 January 2025) was a Swedish Liberal People's Party politician, member of the Riksdag 1998–2006.
