= Henrik von Sydow =

Swedish politician

Henrik von Sydow (born 20 March 1976) is a Swedish politician of the Moderate Party, member of the Riksdag from 2002 to 2014.
