= Alf Eriksson =

Swedish politician (born 1948)

Alf Eriksson (born 1948) is a Swedish Social Democratic politician who has been a member of the Riksdag since 1992.
