= Ivar Franzén =

Swedish politician (1932–2004)

Ivar Franzén (1932–2004) was a farmer and a Swedish politician. He was a member of the Centre Party.
