= Ester Lindstedt-Staaf =

Swedish politician (born 1943)

- Born: 1943 (age 82–83)
- Occupations: Politician and physician
- Known for: Member of the Riksdag

Ester Lindstedt-Staaf (born 1943) is a Swedish Christian Democrat politician and physician. She was a member of the Riksdag from the constituency Hallands län from 1998 to 2002.
