= Helena Storckenfeldt =

Swedish politician (born 1995)

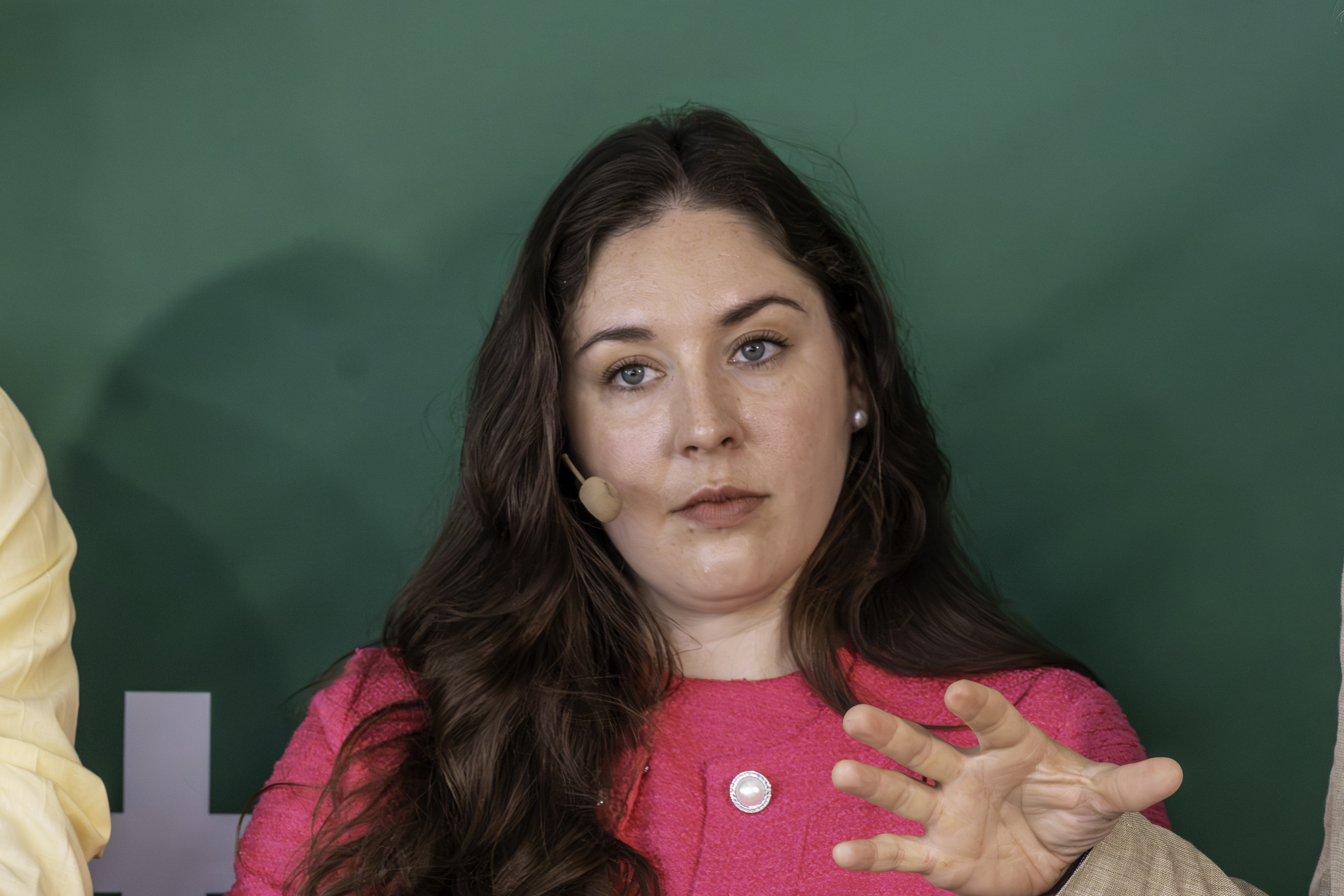
- Photo of Helena Storckenfeldt

Member of the Riksdag
- Incumbent
- Assumed office 2 July 2019
- Preceded by: Jörgen Warborn
- Constituency: Halland County

Personal details
- Born: 28 March 1995 (age 31)
- Party: Moderate Party

Helena Storckenfeldt (née Antoni; born 28 March 1995) is a Swedish politician serving as a member of the Riksdag since 2019. She has been a member of the Parliamentary Assembly of the Organization for Security and Co-operation in Europe since 2023.
