= Nordic College for Public Health =

Coordinates: 57.6838°N 11.8926°E

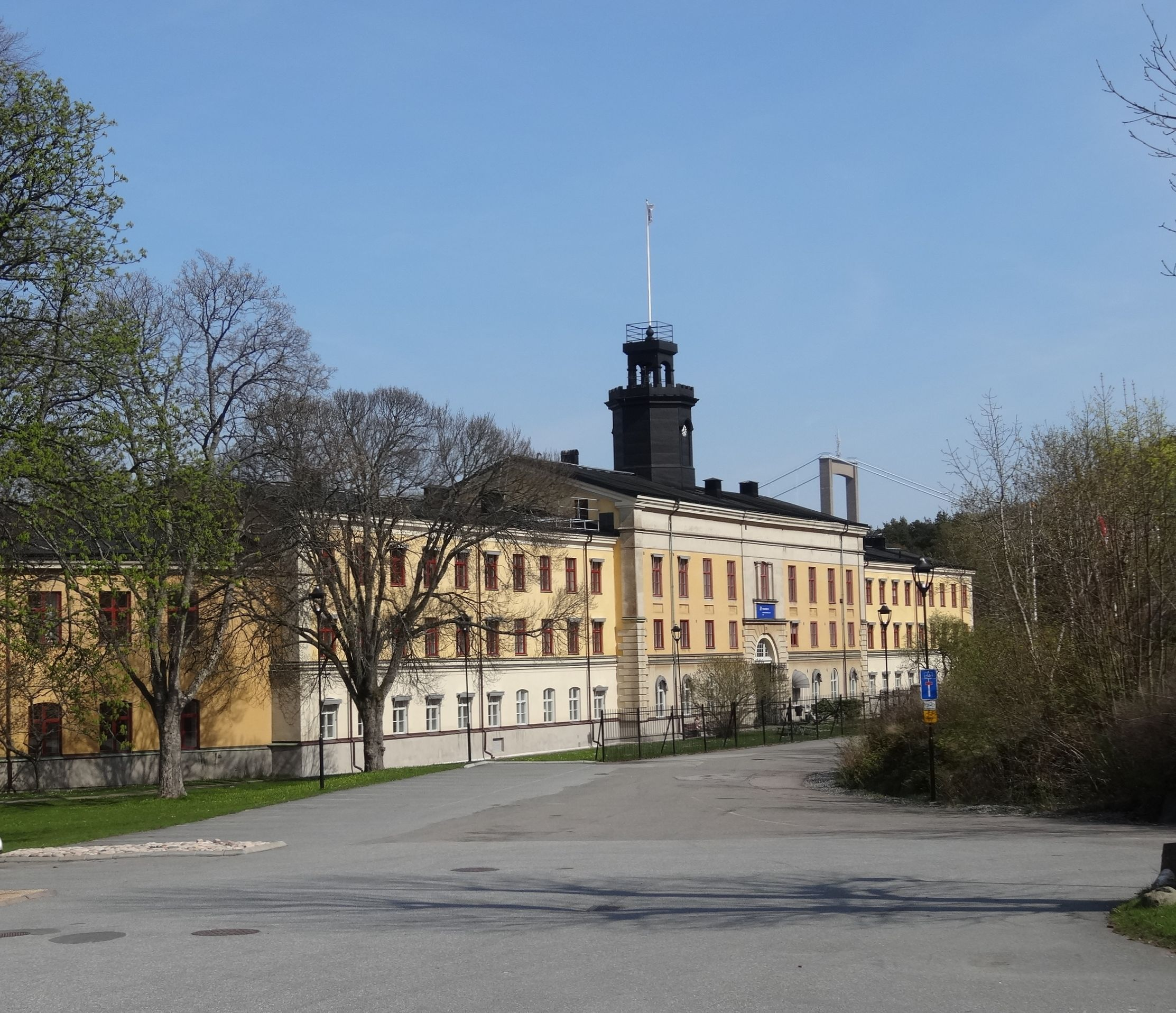
Main building of former NHV

The Nordic College for Public Health (Swedish: Nordiska högskolan för folkhälsovetenskap, NHV) was a shared Nordic educational institution in Gothenburg, Sweden, which educates health personnel on Master's and Doctorate level in addition to doing broader research work. They are financed through the Swedish Department of Health and Social Security and the Nordic Council.

NHV was founded in 1953, started its programmes on Master's level in 1978 and on doctorate level in 1987.

In June 2013, the Nordic Council of Ministers decided to close down the university, which then ceased as an academic institution on 31 December 2014.
