= Axel Kristiansson =

Swedish politician

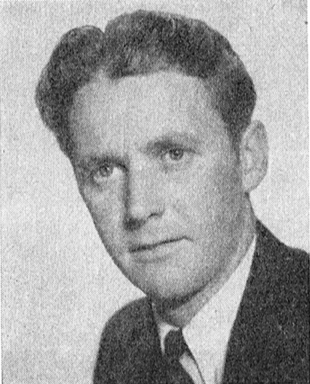
Axel Kristiansson

Axel Kristiansson (1914–1999) was a Swedish politician. He was a member of the Centre Party.
