= Adnan Dibrani =

Swedish politician (born 1985)

Adnan Dibrani MEP
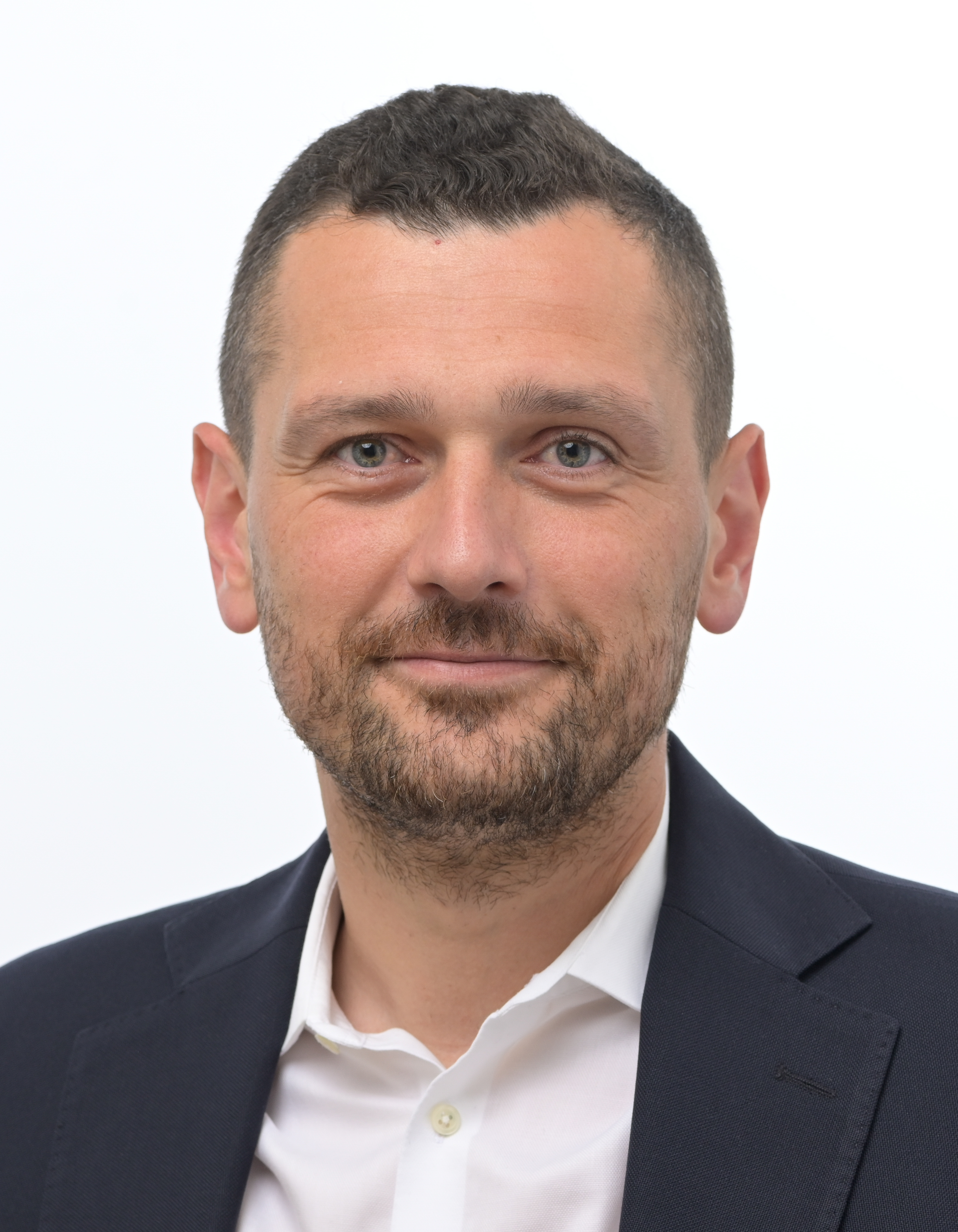

Member of the European Parliament for Sweden
- Incumbent
- Assumed office 16 July 2024

Personal details
- Born: 12 February 1985 (age 41) Titova Mitrovica, SFR Yugoslavia

Adnan Dibrani (born 12 February 1985) is a Swedish politician. He was a Member of the Riksdag for the Social Democrats for 14 years. He was elected by, and represents the Halland constituency. In 2024, he was elected to the European Parliament. Adnan represents west Sweden in the European Parliament. He is a member in the Committee on the Internal Market and Consumer Protection and Delegation to the EU-Albania Stabilisation and Association Parliamentary Committee. Adnan is also a substitute member in the Committee on Budgets, Committee on Economic and Monetary Affairs, Delegation to the EU-Türkiye Joint Parliamentary Committee and Delegation for relations with Bosnia and Herzegovina and Kosovo, including the EU-Bosnia and Herzegovina Stabilisation and Association Parliamentary Committee and the EU-Kosovo Stabilisation and Association Parliamentary Committee.

He has studied economics and prior to going into politics was a bank clerk. In politics he has engaged himself in reforming the taxation system. He came to Sweden from Mitrovica, Kosovo in 1992 as a 7-year-old refugee.
