= Anne Marie Brodén =

Swedish politician (born 1956)

Brodén presenting herself at the Gothenburg Book Fair 2012.

Anne Marie Brodén (born 1956) is a Swedish politician of the Moderate Party. She has been a member of the Riksdag since 2002.
