= Halmstad University, Sweden =

Higher education institution

Halmstad University
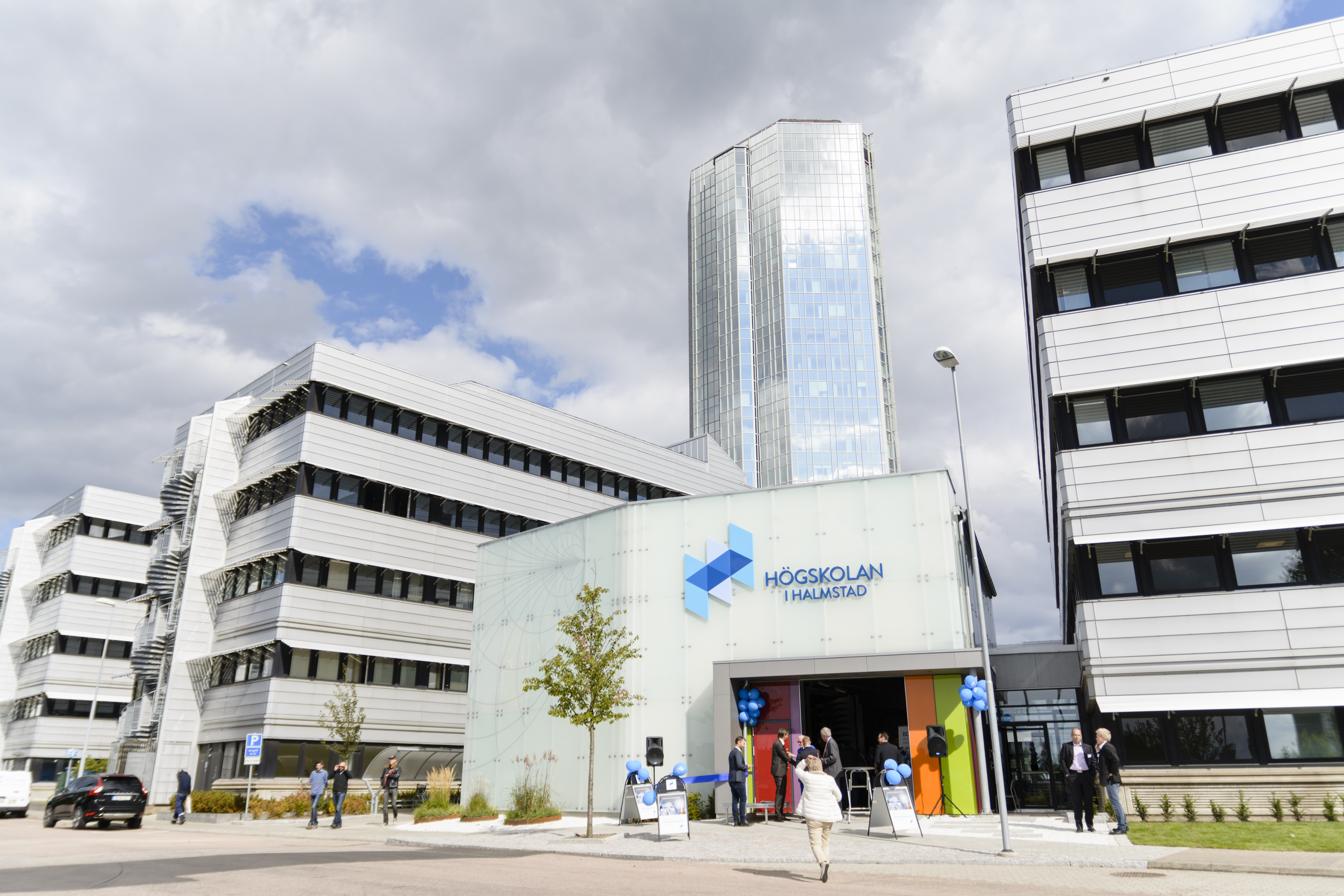
- Type: Public University
- Established: 1983; 42 years ago
- Vice-Chancellor: Susanna Öhman
- Academic staff: 430 (2023)
- Administrative staff: 289 (2023)
- Students: 12,371 (2023)
- Doctoral students: 103 (2023)
- Location: Halmstad, Sweden; 56°39′51″N 12°52′43″E
- Affiliations: EUA, SUHF, NUAS
- Website: www.hh.se

Halmstad University (Swedish: Högskolan i Halmstad) is a university college (Swedish: högskola) in Halmstad, Sweden. It was established in 1983. Halmstad University is a public higher education institution offering bachelor's and master's programmes in various fields of studies. In addition, it conducts PhD programmes in the three fields Information Technology, Innovation Science, and Health and Lifestyle.

During 2022 Halmstad University had 11,831 students, 66 professors and 92 PhD-students. The study programmes and courses include more than 50 programmes and 200 single subject courses.

== History ==
It became an independent university in 1983.

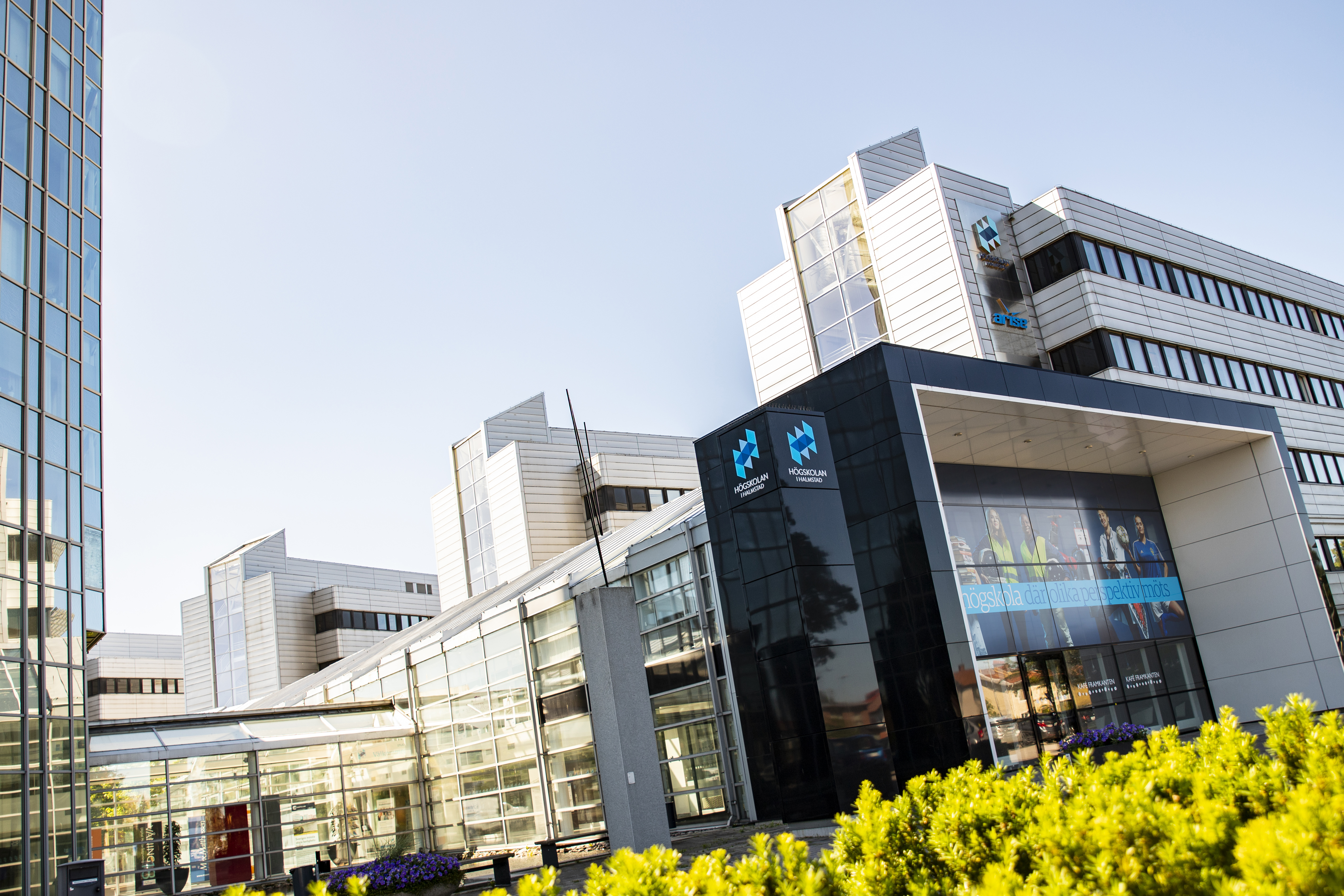
Main entrance to Halmstad University

== Campus ==
Most university institutions are gathered on the main campus, two kilometres south of the city centre and the river Nissan. The area has been named Bærtling Quarters after the in Sweden well-known painter Olle Bærtling, who was born nearby. The university also conducts education at Campus Varberg, in the city of that name, 70 km north of Halmstad.

== Education ==
Halmstad University conducts education within a broad field, but three profile areas are prominent: Health and Lifestyle, Information Technology, and Innovation Sciences. These areas make a base for the university's activities, and it is also in these that the university offers education up to master and PhD-level.

The fields of education include Business, Engineering, Health, Humanities, Social Sciences and Teacher's Education. Bachelor's, Master's, and advanced professional degrees like Master of Science in Business and Economics (Swedish: Civilekonom) and Master of Science and Engineering (Swedish: Civilingenjör) are awarded. As is often the case in the newer universities in Sweden, education is largely applied and often includes project work in collaboration with industry and society. Each year several hundred international degree-seeking students start one of the twelve master's programmes offered in English, and several hundred exchange students follow courses within bachelor-level programmes. PhD-education has been offered since 2010 in the two areas of Information Technology and Innovation Sciences and since 2013 also in Health and Society.

== Research ==
The research is largely conducted multidisciplinary within the university's two focus areas:

- Health Innovation
- Smart Cities and Communities.

== Collaboration with society ==
Cooperation with society is done both through teaching and research. Industry and organisations are involved in study programmes, courses are offered for professionals or commissioned by industry and organisations. Some of the arenas at the university for this cooperation are

- Digital Laboratory Centre
- Electronics Centre in Halmstad
- Fab Lab
- Health Data Centre
- Health Lab
- Leap for Life
- Rydberg Laboratory

== Organisation ==
The University Governing Board is Halmstad University's highest decision-making body. The board consists of eight society representatives appointed by the Swedish government, one of whom is the chairman, Harald Castler, vice-chancellor Susanna Öhman, three representatives elected within the faculty (university teachers) and three student union representatives.

Operations are led by the university management, consisting of the Vice-Chancellor, Pro Vice-Chancellor, Deputy Vice-Chancellors, and the University Director who is in charge of administration. Research and teaching take place within four schools. These are each managed by a dean and a school board.

- School of Business, Innovation and Sustainability
- School of Education, Humanities and Social Sciences
- School of Health and Welfare
- School of Information Technology

== Vice-Chacellors ==
- SvenOve Johansson (1983–1997)
- Lars Fredén (1998–2000)
- Romulo Enmark (2000–2010)
- Mikael Alexandersson (2011–2017)
- Stephen Hwang (2017–2023)
- Susanna Öhman (2023–)

== See also ==
- List of universities in Sweden
