= Knäred =

Swedish locality

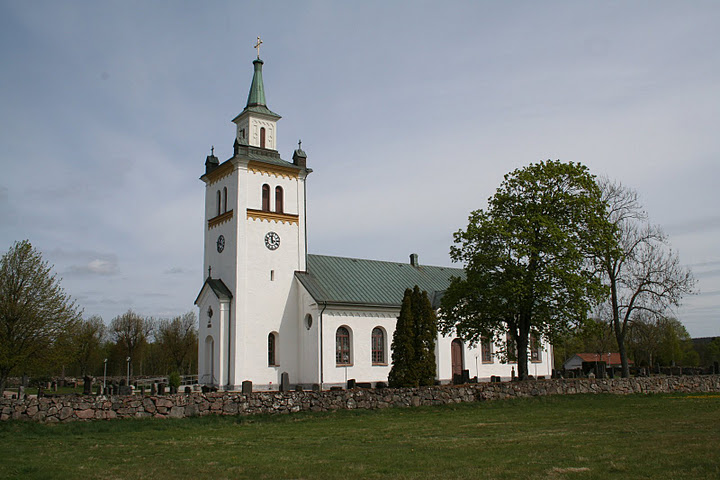

- Location within Halland Location within Sweden
- Coordinates: 56°31′N 13°19′E
- Country: Sweden
- Province: Halland
- County: Halland County
- Municipality: Laholm Municipality

Area
  - Total: 2.26 km^{2} (0.87 sq mi)

Population (31 December 2010)
  - Total: 1,088
  - Density: 482/km^{2} (1,250/sq mi)
- Time zone: UTC+1 (CET)
  - Summer (DST): UTC+2 (CEST)

Knäred (Swedish pronunciation: [ˈknæ̌ːrɛd]) is a locality situated in Laholm Municipality, Halland County, Sweden with 1,088 inhabitants in 2010. The Treaty of Knäred was signed there in 1613, when the province of Halland was still part of Denmark.
