= List of members of the Riksdag, 2022–2026 =

This is a list of members of the Riksdag, elected in the 2022 Swedish general election, for the term 2022–2026. The opening of the new Riksdag session took place on 27 September 2022.

The sitting ended before the 2026 Swedish general election.

== Composition ==
Party	Votes	%	Seats	+/–
Swedish Social Democratic Party	1,964,474	30.33	107	+7
Sweden Democrats	1,330,325	20.54	73	+11
Moderate Party	1,237,428	19.10	68	−2
Left Party	437,050	6.75	24	−4
Centre Party	434,945	6.71	24	−7
Christian Democrats	345,712	5.34	19	−3
Green Party	329,242	5.08	18	+2
Liberals	298,542	4.61	16	−4
Other (Note: Includes political parties that received less than 4% of the popular vote)	100,076	1.54	0	0
Total	6,477,794	100.00	349	0
Valid votes	6,477,794	98.93		
Invalid/blank votes	69,831	1.07		
Total votes	6,547,625	100.00		
Registered voters/turnout	7,775,390	84.21		
Source: Swedish Election Authority

== List of elected MPs ==
No.	Member	Party	Constituency
101	Ann-Sofie Alm	Moderate Party	Västra Götaland County North
177	Alexandra Anstrell	Moderate Party	Stockholm County
111	Kristina Axén Olin	Moderate Party	Stockholm Municipality
48	Lars Beckman	Moderate Party	Gävleborg County
45	Sten Bergheden	Moderate Party	Västra Götaland County East
275	Jörgen Berglund	Moderate Party	Västernorrland County
8	Tobias Billström	Moderate Party	Stockholm County
46	Carl-Oskar Bohlin	Moderate Party	Dalarna County
10	Helena Bouveng	Moderate Party	Jönköping County
221	Camilla Brunsberg	Moderate Party	Blekinge County
5	Margareta Cederfelt	Moderate Party	Stockholm Municipality
273	Mikael Damsgaard	Moderate Party	Västmanland County
112	Ida Drougge	Moderate Party	Stockholm County
328	Lars Engsund	Moderate Party	Kalmar County
6	Karin Enström	Moderate Party	Stockholm County
160	Jan Ericson	Moderate Party	Västra Götaland County South
25	Johan Forssell	Moderate Party	Stockholm Municipality
60	Mats Green	Moderate Party	Jönköping County
265	Gustaf Göthberg	Moderate Party	Gothenburg Municipality
186	Ann-Charlotte Hammar Johnsson	Moderate Party	Skåne Western
259	Ulrika Heindorff	Moderate Party	Skåne Western
19	Johan Hultberg	Moderate Party	Västra Götaland County North
99	Marie-Louise Hänel Sandström	Moderate Party	Gothenburg Municipality
104	Malin Höglund	Moderate Party	Dalarna County
309	Caroline Högström	Moderate Party	Västernorrland County
211	Kjell Jansson	Moderate Party	Stockholm County
233	Pål Jonson	Moderate Party	Värmland County
128	David Josefsson	Moderate Party	Gothenburg Municipality
298	Ellen Juntti	Moderate Party	Västra Götaland County West
172	Arin Karapet	Moderate Party	Stockholm Municipality
139	Mattias Karlsson	Moderate Party	Norrbotten County
30	Ulf Kristersson	Moderate Party	Södermanland County
314	Fredrik Kärrholm	Moderate Party	Stockholm Municipality
59	Ann-Sofie Lifvenhage	Moderate Party	Södermanland County
269	Marléne Lund Kopparklint	Moderate Party	Värmland County
65	Maria Malmer Stenergard	Moderate Party	Skåne Northern and Eastern
246	Josefin Malmqvist	Moderate Party	Stockholm County
63	Noria Manouchi	Moderate Party	Malmö Municipality
225	Louise Meijer	Moderate Party	Skåne Southern
329	Marie Nicholson	Moderate Party	Kalmar County
231	Ulrik Nilsson	Moderate Party	Västra Götaland County South
132	Charlotte Nordström	Moderate Party	Västra Götaland County East
89	Andreas Norlén	Moderate Party	Östergötland County
93	Peter Ollén	Moderate Party	Malmö Municipality
322	Stefan Olsson	Moderate Party	Uppsala County
174	Erik Ottoson	Moderate Party	Stockholm County
127	Lars Püss	Moderate Party	Halland County
202	Saila Quicklund	Moderate Party	Jämtland County
290	Thomas Ragnarsson	Moderate Party	Kronoberg County
337	Johanna Rantsi	Moderate Party	Västra Götaland County West
241	Edward Riedl	Moderate Party	Västerbotten County
26	Jessica Rosencrantz	Moderate Party	Stockholm Municipality
291	Oliver Rosengren	Moderate Party	Kronoberg County
146	Jessika Roswall	Moderate Party	Uppsala County
248	Magdalena Schröder	Moderate Party	Stockholm County
12	Jesper Skalberg Karlsson	Moderate Party	Gotland County
332	Christian Sonesson	Moderate Party	Skåne Southern
52	Maria Stockhaus	Moderate Party	Stockholm County
157	Helena Storckenfeldt	Moderate Party	Halland County
234	Elisabeth Svantesson	Moderate Party	Örebro County
343	Oskar Svärd	Moderate Party	Örebro County
15	Hans Wallmark	Moderate Party	Skåne Northern and Eastern
299	Camilla Waltersson Grönvall	Moderate Party	Västra Götaland County West
325	John Weinerhall	Moderate Party	Östergötland County
252	John Widegren	Moderate Party	Östergötland County
82	Niklas Wykman	Moderate Party	Stockholm County
77	Viktor Wärnick	Moderate Party	Gävleborg County
125	Boriana Åberg	Moderate Party	Skåne Southern
212	Alireza Akhondi	Centre Party	Stockholm County
226	Christofer Bergenblock	Centre Party	Halland County
209	Malin Björk	Centre Party	Stockholm Municipality
163	Daniel Bäckström	Centre Party	Värmland County
331	Jonny Cato	Centre Party	Skåne Western
326	Muharrem Demirok	Centre Party	Östergötland County
251	Catarina Deremar	Centre Party	Uppsala County
44	Ulrika Heie	Centre Party	Västra Götaland County East
58	Martina Johansson	Centre Party	Södermanland County
23	Anders W. Jonsson	Centre Party	Gävleborg County
230	Mikael Larsson	Centre Party	Västra Götaland County South
260	Stina Larsson	Centre Party	Skåne Southern
285	Anna Lasses	Centre Party	Stockholm County
134	Ulrika Liljeberg	Centre Party	Dalarna County
240	Helena Lindahl	Centre Party	Västerbotten County
3	Kerstin Lundgren	Centre Party	Stockholm County
33	Annie Lööf	Centre Party	Jönköping County
40	Rickard Nordin	Centre Party	Gothenburg Municipality
62	Niels Paarup-Petersen	Centre Party	Malmö Municipality
311	Anne-Li Sjölund	Centre Party	Västernorrland County
278	Elisabeth Thand Ringqvist	Centre Party	Stockholm Municipality
235	Helena Vilhelmsson	Centre Party	Örebro County
338	Anders Ådahl	Centre Party	Västra Götaland County West
140	Martin Ådahl	Centre Party	Stockholm Municipality
175	Gulan Avci	Liberals	Stockholm County
253	Juno Blom	Liberals	Östergötland County
207	Malin Danielsson	Liberals	Stockholm Municipality
122	Louise Eklund	Liberals	Malmö Municipality
206	Joar Forssell	Liberals	Stockholm Municipality
301	Helena Gellerman	Liberals	Västra Götaland County West
69	Robert Hannah	Liberals	Gothenburg Municipality
27	Fredrik Malm	Liberals	Stockholm County
215	Lina Nordquist	Liberals	Uppsala County
151	Jakob Olofsgård	Liberals	Jönköping County
198	Johan Pehrson	Liberals	Örebro County
154	Mats Persson	Liberals	Skåne Southern
316	Romina Pourmokhtari	Liberals	Stockholm Municipality
258	Mauricio Rojas	Liberals	Skåne Western
227	Cecilia Rönn	Liberals	Halland County
283	Anna Starbrink	Liberals	Stockholm Municipality
91	Acko Ankarberg Johansson	Christian Democrats	Jönköping County
107	Lili André	Christian Democrats	Gävleborg County
165	Mathias Bengtsson	Christian Democrats	Dalarna County
193	Magnus Berntsson	Christian Democrats	Gothenburg Municipality
170	Camilla Brodin	Christian Democrats	Stockholm Municipality
293	Gudrun Brunegård	Christian Democrats	Kalmar County
102	Ebba Busch	Christian Democrats	Västra Götaland County East
249	Christian Carlsson	Christian Democrats	Stockholm Municipality
270	Hans Eklind	Christian Democrats	Örebro County
95	Torsten Elofsson	Christian Democrats	Skåne Northern and Eastern
261	Cecilia Engström	Christian Democrats	Skåne Southern
29	Jakob Forssmed	Christian Democrats	Stockholm County
71	Magnus Jacobsson	Christian Democrats	Västra Götaland County North
195	Ingemar Kihlström	Christian Democrats	Västra Götaland County South
148	Magnus Oscarsson	Christian Democrats	Östergötland County
116	Mikael Oscarsson	Christian Democrats	Uppsala County
304	Kjell-Arne Ottosson	Christian Democrats	Värmland County
126	Larry Söder	Christian Democrats	Halland County
264	Roland Utbult	Christian Democrats	Västra Götaland County West
86	Sofia Amloh	Social Democrats	Södermanland County
118	Johan Andersson	Social Democrats	Östergötland County
53	Magdalena Andersson	Social Democrats	Stockholm County
166	Sanna Backeskog	Social Democrats	Gävleborg County
271	Denis Begic	Social Democrats	Örebro County
263	Aida Birinxhiku	Social Democrats	Halland County
21	Patrik Björck	Social Democrats	Västra Götaland County East
346	Peder Björk	Social Democrats	Västernorrland County
184	Heléne Björklund	Social Democrats	Blekinge County
223	Yasmine Bladelius	Social Democrats	Skåne Western
68	Johan Büser	Social Democrats	Gothenburg Municipality
17	Gunilla Carlsson	Social Democrats	Gothenburg Municipality
92	Rose-Marie Carlsson	Social Democrats	Malmö Municipality
181	Teresa Carvalho	Social Democrats	Östergötland County
228	Dzenan Cisija	Social Democrats	Gothenburg Municipality
197	Mikael Dahlqvist	Social Democrats	Värmland County
7	Mikael Damberg	Social Democrats	Stockholm County
182	Ilan De Basso	Social Democrats	Jönköping County
97	Adnan Dibrani	Social Democrats	Halland County
32	Hans Ekström	Social Democrats	Södermanland County
35	Jamal El-Haj	Social Democrats	Malmö Municipality
218	Tomas Eneroth	Social Democrats	Kronoberg County
75	Sofie Eriksson	Social Democrats	Dalarna County
236	Åsa Eriksson	Social Democrats	Västmanland County
199	Matilda Ernkrans	Social Democrats	Örebro County
172	Erik Ezelius	Social Democrats	Västra Götaland County East
336	Aylin Fazelian	Social Democrats	Västra Götaland County West
1	Kenneth G. Forslund	Social Democrats	Västra Götaland County West
205	Isak From	Social Democrats	Västerbotten County
155	Marianne Fundahn	Social Democrats	Skåne Southern
281	Jytte Guteland	Social Democrats	Stockholm Municipality
254	Monica Haider	Social Democrats	Kronoberg County
220	Lena Hallengren	Social Democrats	Kalmar County
61	Johanna Haraldsson	Social Democrats	Jönköping County
348	Peter Hedberg	Social Democrats	Västernorrland County
31	Caroline Helmersson Olsson	Social Democrats	Södermanland County
70	Paula Holmqvist	Social Democrats	Västra Götaland County North
22	Peter Hultqvist	Social Democrats	Dalarna County
38	Per-Arne Håkansson	Social Democrats	Skåne Northern and Eastern
135	Lars Isaksson	Social Democrats	Dalarna County
308	Lena Johansson	Social Democrats	Västmanland County
124	Morgan Johansson	Social Democrats	Skåne Southern
18	Mattias Jonsson	Social Democrats	Gothenburg Municipality
302	Joakim Järrebring	Social Democrats	Västra Götaland County West
279	Markus Kallifatides	Social Democrats	Stockholm Municipality
108	Ida Karkiainen	Social Democrats	Norrbotten County
222	Niklas Karlsson	Social Democrats	Skåne Western
277	Åsa Karlsson	Social Democrats	Västerbotten County
208	Kadir Kasirga	Social Democrats	Stockholm Municipality
292	Tomas Kronståhl	Social Democrats	Kalmar County
143	Serkan Köse	Social Democrats	Stockholm County
179	Gustaf Lantz	Social Democrats	Uppsala County
133	Lars Mejern Larsson	Social Democrats	Värmland County
310	Malin Larsson	Social Democrats	Västernorrland County
169	Zara Leghissa	Social Democrats	Norrbotten County
178	Sanne Lennström	Social Democrats	Uppsala County
106	Kristoffer Lindberg	Social Democrats	Gävleborg County
271	Eva Lindh	Social Democrats	Östergötland County
78	Fredrik Lundh Sammeli	Social Democrats	Norrbotten County
76	Patrik Lundqvist	Social Democrats	Gävleborg County
161	Petter Löberg	Social Democrats	Västra Götaland County South
88	Johan Löfstrand	Social Democrats	Östergötland County
333	Adrian Magnusson	Social Democrats	Skåne Southern
153	Magnus Manhammar	Social Democrats	Blekinge County
330	Ola Möller	Social Democrats	Skåne Western
257	Laila Naraghi	Social Democrats	Kalmar County
96	Jennie Nilsson	Social Democrats	Halland County
28	Ingela Nylund Watz	Social Democrats	Stockholm County
54	Leif Nysmed	Social Democrats	Stockholm County
20	Carina Ohlsson	Social Democrats	Västra Götaland County East
9	Fredrik Olovsson	Social Democrats	Södermanland County
239	Kalle Olsson	Social Democrats	Jämtland County
149	Mattias Ottosson	Social Democrats	Östergötland County
204	Amalia Rud Pedersen	Social Democrats	Gothenburg Municipality
229	Helén Pettersson	Social Democrats	Västerbotten County
94	Ewa Pihl Krabbe	Social Democrats	Skåne Northern and Eastern
81	Lawen Redar	Social Democrats	Stockholm Municipality
267	Jessica Rodén	Social Democrats	Västra Götaland County South
115	Azadeh Rojhan Gustafsson	Social Democrats	Stockholm County
243	Mirja Räihä	Social Democrats	Stockholm Municipality
37	Joakim Sandell	Social Democrats	Malmö Municipality
210	Markus Selin	Social Democrats	Stockholm County
147	Ardalan Shekarabi	Social Democrats	Uppsala County
183	Niklas Sigvardsson	Social Democrats	Jönköping County
286	Inga-Lill Sjöblom	Social Democrats	Uppsala County
109	Linus Sköld	Social Democrats	Norrbotten County
305	Sofia Skönnbrink	Social Democrats	Värmland County
142	Annika Strandhäll	Social Democrats	Stockholm Municipality
344	Anna-Belle Strömberg	Social Democrats	Västernorrland County
341	Karin Sundin	Social Democrats	Örebro County
162	Gunilla Svantorp	Social Democrats	Värmland County
238	Anna-Caren Sätherberg	Social Democrats	Jämtland County
144	Mathias Tegnér	Social Democrats	Stockholm County
200	Olle Thorell	Social Democrats	Västmanland County
131	Louise Thunström	Social Democrats	Västra Götaland County North
315	Daniel Vencu Velasquez Castro	Social Democrats	Stockholm Municipality
110	Mattias Vepsä	Social Democrats	Stockholm Municipality
176	Anna Vikström	Social Democrats	Stockholm County
85	Alexandra Völker	Social Democrats	Stockholm County
66	Anna Wallentheim	Social Democrats	Skåne Northern and Eastern
11	Hanna Westerén	Social Democrats	Gotland County
55	Åsa Westlund	Social Democrats	Stockholm County
167	Linnéa Wickman	Social Democrats	Gävleborg County
276	Björn Wiechel	Social Democrats	Västerbotten County
100	Mats Wiking	Social Democrats	Västra Götaland County North
4	Anders Ygeman	Social Democrats	Stockholm Municipality
90	Carina Ödebrink	Social Democrats	Jönköping County
319	Andrea Andersson-Tay	Left Party	Stockholm County
342	Nadja Awad	Left Party	Örebro County
84	Nooshi Dadgostar	Left Party	Stockholm County
141	Lorena Delgado Varas	Left Party	Stockholm Municipality
50	Ali Esbati	Left Party	Stockholm Municipality
105	Kajsa Fredholm	Left Party	Dalarna County
171	Ida Gabrielsson	Left Party	Stockholm Municipality
137	Samuel Gonzalez Westling	Left Party	Gävleborg County
189	Hanna Gunnarsson	Left Party	Skåne Southern
158	Tony Haddou	Left Party	Gothenburg Municipality
36	Momodou Malcolm Jallow	Left Party	Malmö Municipality
57	Lotta Johnsson Fornarve	Left Party	Södermanland County
42	Maj Karlsson	Left Party	Gothenburg Municipality
79	Birger Lahti	Left Party	Norrbotten County
347	Isabell Mixter	Left Party	Västernorrland County
312	Gudrun Nordborg	Left Party	Västerbotten County
113	Daniel Riazat	Left Party	Stockholm County
51	Karin Rågsjö	Left Party	Stockholm Municipality
232	Håkan Svenneling	Left Party	Värmland County
214	Ilona Szatmári Waldau	Left Party	Uppsala County
237	Vasiliki Tsouplaki	Left Party	Västmanland County
150	Ciczie Weidby	Left Party	Jönköping County
180	Linda Westerlund Snecker	Left Party	Östergötland County
334	Jessica Wetterling	Left Party	Västra Götaland County West
129	Leila Ali Elmi	Green Party	Gothenburg Municipality
300	Janine Alm Ericson	Green Party	Västra Götaland County West
224	Emma Berginger	Green Party	Skåne Southern
24	Per Bolund	Green Party	Stockholm Municipality
320	Camilla Hansén	Green Party	Örebro County
244	Daniel Helldén	Green Party	Stockholm Municipality
145	Annika Hirvonen	Green Party	Stockholm County
87	Linus Lakso	Green Party	Södermanland County
324	Rebecka Le Moine	Green Party	Östergötland County
318	Amanda Lind	Green Party	Stockholm County
242	Åsa Lindhagen	Green Party	Stockholm Municipality
14	Rasmus Ling	Green Party	Malmö Municipality
159	Emma Nohrén	Green Party	Gothenburg Municipality
190	Jan Riise	Green Party	Halland County
323	Jacob Risberg	Green Party	Uppsala County
284	Märta Stenevi	Green Party	Stockholm County
349	Elin Söderberg	Green Party	Västerbotten County
280	Ulrika Westerlund	Green Party	Stockholm Municipality
34	Jimmie Åkesson	Sweden Democrats	Jönköping County
266	Anders Alftberg	Sweden Democrats	Västra Götaland County South
289	Jonas Andersson	Sweden Democrats	Östergötland County
188	Lars Andersson	Sweden Democrats	Skåne Southern
313	Pontus Andersson	Sweden Democrats	Västerbotten County
103	Tobias Andersson	Sweden Democrats	Västra Götaland County East
288	Clara Aranda	Sweden Democrats	Östergötland County
282	Mats Arkhem	Sweden Democrats	Stockholm County
213	Ludvig Aspling	Sweden Democrats	Stockholm County
80	Angelika Bengtsson	Sweden Democrats	Stockholm Municipality
156	Sara-Lena Bjälkö	Sweden Democrats	Halland County
164	Anna-Lena Blomkvist	Sweden Democrats	Dalarna County
191	Carita Boulwén	Sweden Democrats	Halland County
294	Bo Broman	Sweden Democrats	Skåne Western
256	Mattias Bäckström Johansson	Sweden Democrats	Kalmar County
303	Alexander Christiansson	Sweden Democrats	Västra Götaland County West
98	Dennis Dioukarev	Sweden Democrats	Gothenburg Municipality
120	Staffan Eklöf	Sweden Democrats	Jönköping County
216	Aron Emilsson	Sweden Democrats	Östergötland County
130	Matheus Enholm	Sweden Democrats	Västra Götaland County North
335	Yasmine Eriksson	Sweden Democrats	Västra Götaland County West
117	Mattias Eriksson Falk	Sweden Democrats	Södermanland County
64	Mikael Eskilandersson	Sweden Democrats	Skåne Northern and Eastern
339	Rashid Farivar	Sweden Democrats	Västra Götaland County West
196	Runar Filper	Sweden Democrats	Värmland County
203	Josef Fransson	Sweden Democrats	Blekinge County
185	Ann-Christine From Utterstedt	Sweden Democrats	Jämtland County
123	Nima Gholam Ali Pour	Sweden Democrats	Malmö Municipality
74	Sara Gille	Sweden Democrats	Dalarna County
73	Jörgen Grubb	Sweden Democrats	Västra Götaland County East
49	Roger Hedlund	Sweden Democrats	Gävleborg County
262	Erik Hellsborn	Sweden Democrats	Halland County
152	Richard Jomshof	Sweden Democrats	Blekinge County
194	Patrik Jönsson	Sweden Democrats	Västra Götaland County South
219	Mattias Karlsson i Norrhult	Sweden Democrats	Kronoberg County
83	Martin Kinnunen	Sweden Democrats	Stockholm County
2	Julia Kronlid	Sweden Democrats	Stockholm County
317	Gabriel Kroon	Sweden Democrats	Stockholm Municipality
247	Fredrik Lindahl	Sweden Democrats	Stockholm County
295	Linda Lindberg	Sweden Democrats	Skåne Western
345	Ulf Lindholm	Sweden Democrats	Västernorrland County
272	Angelica Lundberg	Sweden Democrats	Västmanland County
274	Mats Hellhoff	Sweden Democrats	Västernorrland County
56	Adam Marttinen	Sweden Democrats	Södermanland County
67	Thomas Morell	Sweden Democrats	Skåne Northern and Eastern
47	Mats Nordberg	Sweden Democrats	Dalarna County
255	Katja Nyberg	Sweden Democrats	Kronoberg County
327	Mona Olin	Sweden Democrats	Kalmar County
138	Eric Palmqvist	Sweden Democrats	Norrbotten County
250	David Perez	Sweden Democrats	Uppsala County
136	Daniel Persson	Sweden Democrats	Gävleborg County
39	Magnus Persson	Sweden Democrats	Skåne Northern and Eastern
268	Charlotte Quensel	Sweden Democrats	Värmland County
13	Patrick Reslow	Sweden Democrats	Malmö Municipality
306	Michael Rubbestad	Sweden Democrats	Örebro County
201	Oscar Sjöstedt	Sweden Democrats	Västmanland County
297	Jessica Stegrud	Sweden Democrats	Skåne Southern
114	Robert Stenkvist	Sweden Democrats	Stockholm County
41	Jimmy Ståhl	Sweden Democrats	Gothenburg Municipality
187	Carina Ståhl Herrstedt	Sweden Democrats	Skåne Western
168	Johnny Svedin	Sweden Democrats	Norrbotten County
119	Sven-Olof Sällström	Sweden Democrats	Östergötland County
16	Björn Söder	Sweden Democrats	Skåne Northern and Eastern
307	Per Söderlund	Sweden Democrats	Örebro County
296	Victoria Tiblom	Sweden Democrats	Skåne Southern
192	Björn Tidland	Sweden Democrats	Gothenburg Municipality
320	Beatrice Timgren	Sweden Democrats	Stockholm County
173	Henrik Vinge	Sweden Democrats	Stockholm Municipality
121	Eric Westroth	Sweden Democrats	Jönköping County
245	Elsa Widding	Sweden Democrats	Stockholm Municipality
43	Markus Wiechel	Sweden Democrats	Västra Götaland County North
287	Kent Kumpula	Sweden Democrats	Uppsala County
321	Leonid Yurkovskiy	Sweden Democrats	Stockholm County

== Members who resigned and their successors ==
Seat	Member of Parliament	From	To	Party	Constituency	Successor
20	Carina Ohlsson	26 September 2022	26 September 2022	Social Democrats	Västra Götaland County East	Ida Ekeroth Clausson
182	Ilan de Basso	26 September 2022	26 September 2022	Social Democrats	Jönköping County	Azra Muranovic
332	Christian Sonesson	26 September 2022	11 October 2022	Moderate	Skåne Southern	Emma Ahlström Köster
317	Gabriel Kroon	26 September 2022	12 October 2022	Sweden Democrats	Stockholm Municipality	Martin Westmont
242	Åsa Lindhagen	26 September 2022	18 October 2022	Green	Stockholm Municipality	Katarina Luhr
47	Mats Nordberg (Note: Mats Nordberg died 15 January 2023)	26 September 2022	15 January 2023	Sweden Democrats	Dalarna County	Rasmus Giertz
33	Annie Lööf	26 September 2022	19 February 2023	Centre	Jönköping County	Anders Karlsson
24	Per Bolund	26 September 2022	31 December 2023	Green	Stockholm Municipality	Mats Berglund
50	Ali Esbati	26 September 2022	7 January 2024	Left	Stockholm Municipality	Andreas Lennkvist Manriquez
253	Juno Blom	26 September 2022	29 February 2024	Liberals	Östergötland County	Patrik Karlsson
70	Paula Holmqvist	26 September 2022	3 March 2024	Social Democrats	Västra Götaland County North	Jonathan Svensson
119	Sven-Olof Sällström (Note: Sven-Olof Sällström died 14 March 2024)	26 September 2022	14 March 2024	Sweden Democrats	Östergötland County	Göran Hargestam
274	David Lång	26 September 2022	19 June 2024	Sweden Democrats	Västernorrland County	Mats Hellhoff
320	Beatrice Timgren	26 September 2022	15 July 2024	Sweden Democrats	Stockholm County	Mściwoj Swigon
75	Sofie Eriksson	26 September 2022	15 July 2024	Social Democrats	Dalarna County	Marie Olsson
97	Adnan Dibrani	26 September 2022	15 July 2024	Social Democrats	Halland County	Arbër Gashi
97	Lars Wistedt (Note: Lars Wistedt died 25 November 2024)	26 September 2022	25 November 2024	Sweden Democrats	Uppsala County	Kent Kumpula

== Substitutes ==
Below are substitutes who served for regular members.

Seat	Member of Parliament	From	To	Party	Constituency	Substituting for
53	Christopher Lindvall	26 September 2022	18 October 2022	Social Democrats	Stockholm County	Magdalena Andersson
7	Solange Olame Bayibsa	26 September 2022	18 October 2022	Social Democrats	Stockholm County	Mikael Damberg
218	Robert Olesen	26 September 2022	18 October 2022	Social Democrats	Kronoberg County	Tomas Eneroth
199	Daniel Andersson	26 September 2022	18 October 2022	Social Democrats	Örebro County	Matilda Ernkrans
220	Björn Petersson	26 September 2022	6 October 2022	Social Democrats	Kalmar County	Lena Hallengren
22	Roza Güclü Hedin	26 September 2022	18 October 2022	Social Democrats	Dalarna County	Peter Hultqvist
124	Elin Gustafsson	26 September 2022	18 October 2022	Social Democrats	Skåne Southern	Morgan Johansson
108	Louise Mörk	26 September 2022	18 October 2022	Social Democrats	Norrbotten County	Ida Karkiainen
147	Marcus Wennerström	26 September 2022	18 October 2022	Social Democrats	Stockholm County	Ardalan Shekarabi
142	Sultan Kayhan	26 September 2022	18 October 2022	Social Democrats	Stockholm Municipality	Annika Strandhäll
238	Lena Bäckelin	26 September 2022	18 October 2022	Social Democrats	Jämtland County	Anna-Caren Sätherberg
4	Elsemarie Bjellqvist	26 September 2022	18 October 2022	Social Democrats	Stockholm Municipality	Anders Ygeman
74	Rasmus Giertz	26 September 2022	17 January 2023	Sweden Democrats	Dalarna County	Sara Gille
89	Susanne Nordström	26 September 2022	present	Moderate	Östergötland County	Andreas Norlén
9	Alexander Wasberg	26 September 2022	17 October 2022	Social Democrats	Södermanland County	Fredrik Olovsson
153	Annette Rydell	5 October 2022	31 July 2023	Social Democrats	Blekinge County	Magnus Manhammar
91	Camilla Rinaldo Miller	18 October 2022	present	Christian Democrats	Jönköping County	Acko Ankarberg Johansson
8	Johanna Hornberger	18 October 2022	present	Moderate	Stockholm County	Tobias Billström
46	Crister Carlsson	18 October 2022	present	Moderate	Dalarna County	Carl-Oskar Bohlin
102	Dan Hovskär	18 October 2022	present	Christian Democrats	Västra Götaland County East	Ebba Busch
25	Carl Nordblom	18 October 2022	present	Moderate	Stockholm Municipality	Johan Forssell
29	Nike Örbrink	18 October 2022	7 November 2022	Christian Democrats	Stockholm County	Jakob Forssmed
233	Magnus Resare	18 October 2022	present	Moderate	Värmland County	Pål Jonson
30	Anna af Sillén	18 October 2022	present	Moderate	Södermanland County	Ulf Kristersson
65	Lars Johnsson	18 October 2022	present	Moderate	Skåne Northern and Eastern	Maria Malmer Stenergard
198	Elin Nilsson	18 October 2022	present	Liberals	Örebro County	Johan Pehrson
154	Camilla Mårtensen	18 October 2022	present	Liberals	Skåne Southern	Mats Persson
316	Carl B. Hamilton	18 October 2022	21 July 2023	Liberals	Stockholm Municipality	Romina Pourmokhtari
146	Fredrik Ahlstedt	18 October 2022	present	Moderate	Uppsala County	Jessika Roswall
234	Katarina Tolgfors	18 October 2022	present	Moderate	Örebro County	Elisabeth Svantesson
82	Adam Reuterskiöld	18 October 2022	present	Moderate	Stockholm County	Niklas Wykman
299	Jennie Wernäng	25 October 2022	present	Moderate	Västra Götaland County West	Camilla Waltersson Grönvall
206	Martin Melin	31 October 2022	30 April 2023	Liberals	Stockholm Municipality	Joar Forssell
76	Jim Svensk Larm	1 November 2022	29 October 2023	Social Democrats	Gävleborg County	Patrik Lindqvist
87	Marielle Lahti	1 November 2022	25 June 2023	Green	Södermanland County	Linus Lakso
14	Bassem Nasr	7 November 2022	9 April 2023	Green	Malmö Municipality	Rasmus Ling
29	Yusuf Aydin	8 November 2022	present	Christian Democrats	Stockholm County	Jakob Forssmed
129	Niklas Attefjord	11 November 2022	14 December 2022	Green	Gothenburg Municipality	Leila Ali Elmi
203	Anette Rangdag	12 November 2022	12 December 2022	Sweden Democrats	Jämtland County	Josef Fransson
72	Marcus Andersson	14 November 2022	14 May 2023	Social Democrats	Västra Götaland County East	Erik Ezelius
158	Frida Tånghag	9 January 2023	14 May 2023	Left	Gothenburg Municipality	Tony Haddou
224	Ulf Holm	12 January 2023	25 February 2023	Green	Skåne Southern	Emma Berginger
239	Lena Bäckelin	15 January 2023	24 February 2023	Social Democrats	Jämtland County	Kalle Olsson
26	Merit Frost Lindberg	16 January 2023	13 August 2023	Moderate	Stockholm Municipality	Jessica Rosencrantz
74	Daniel Lönn	18 January 2023	31 March 2023	Sweden Democrats	Dalarna County	Sara Gille
246	Joanna Lewerentz	30 January 2023	21 May 2023	Moderate	Stockholm County	Josefin Malmqvist
248	Fredrik Saweståhl	1 March 2023	31 May 2023	Moderate	Stockholm County	Magdalena Thuresson
224	Ulf Holm	4 March 2023	7 April 2023	Green	Skåne Southern	Emma Berginger
37	Zinaida Kajevic	6 March 2023	7 August 2023	Social Democrats	Malmö Municipality	Joakim Sandell
276	Fredrik Stenberg	1 April 2023	24 September 2023	Social Democrats	Västerbotten County	Björn Wiechel
203	Anette Rangdag	10 April 2023	12 May 2023	Sweden Democrats	Jämtland County	Josef Fransson
14	Malte Roos	10 April 2023	7 May 2023	Green	Malmö Municipality	Rasmus Ling
258	Amir Jawad	22 May 2023	13 July 2023	Liberals	Skåne Western	Mauricio Rojas
92	Arwin Sohrabi	22 May 2023	16 July 2023	Social Democrats	Malmö Municipality	Rose-Marie Carlsson
316	Martin Melin	22 August 2023	present	Liberals	Stockholm Municipality	Romina Pourmokhtari
179	Marcus Wennerström	28 August 2023	30 April 2024	Social Democrats	Uppsala County	Gustaf Lantz
70	Jonathan Svensson	28 August 2023	3 March 2024	Social Democrats	Västra Götaland County North	Paula Holmqvist
330	Agneta Nilsson	14 October 2023	13 November 2023	Social Democrats	Skåne Western	Ola Möller
239	Lena Bäckelin	16 October 2023	1 May 2024	Social Democrats	Jämtland County	Kalle Olsson
92	Zinaida Kajevic	27 November 2023	30 January 2024	Social Democrats	Malmö Municipality	Rose-Marie Carlsson
163	Mona Smedman	1 January 2024	31 May 2024	Centre	Värmland County	Daniel Bäckström
229	Mariya Voyvodova	8 January 2024	12 June 2024	Social Democrats	Gothenburg Municipality	Amalia Rud Stenlöf
62	Emelie Nyman	10 January 2024	23 June 2024	Centre	Malmö Municipality	Niels Paarup-Petersen
298	Anna Vedin	15 January 2024	12 April 2024	Moderate	Västra Götaland County West	Ellen Juntti
80	Unni Björnerfors	16 January 2024	present	Sweden Democrats	Stockholm Municipality	Angelika Bengtsson
203	Anette Rangdag	26 January 2024	31 March 2024	Sweden Democrats	Värmland County	Josef Fransson
336	Paula Örn	30 January 2024	present	Social Democrats	Västra Götaland County West	Aylin Nouri
220	Björn Petersson	21 February 2024	24 March 2024	Social Democrats	Kalmar County	Lena Hallengren
43	Ulf Rexefjord	26 February 2024	26 March 2024	Sweden Democrats	Västra Götaland County North	Markus Wiechel
309	Eleonore Lundkvist	25 March 2024	present	Moderate	Västmanland County	Caroline Högström
250	Kent Kumpula	1 April 2024	27 November 2024	Sweden Democrats	Uppsala County	David Perez
203	Anette Rangdag	2 April 2024	30 June 2024	Sweden Democrats	Värmland County	Josef Fransson
249	Liza-Maria Norlin	2 April 2024	16 June 2024	Christian Democrats	Stockholm County	Christian Carlsson
284	Amanda Palmstierna	18 April 2024	31 May 2024	Green	Stockholm County	Märta Stenevi
248	Joanna Lewerentz	22 April 2024	present	Moderate	Stockholm County	Magdalena Thuresson
