= Anders W. Jonsson =

Swedish politician (born 1961)

Anders W. Jonsson C
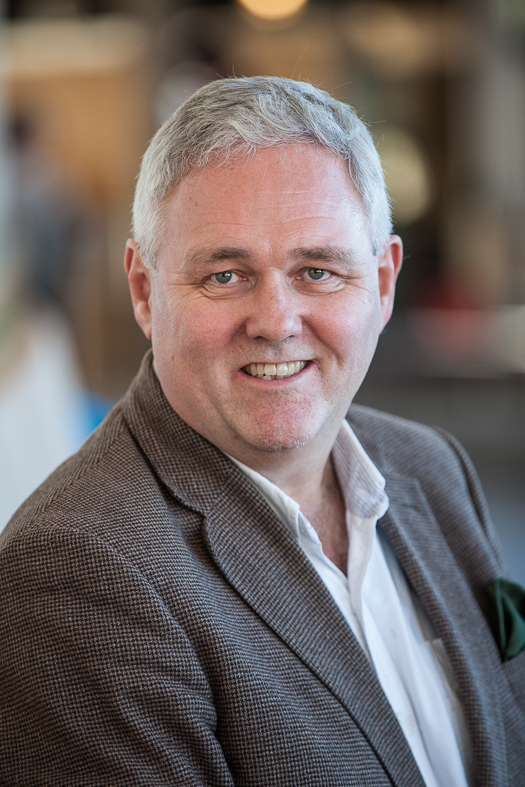
- Oscarsson in 2015

Parliamentary leader of the Center Party
- In office 11 October 2011 – 26 September 2022
- Preceded by: Roger Tiefensee
- Succeeded by: Daniel Bäckström

Member of the Riksdag
- Incumbent
- Assumed office 10 October 2010
- Preceded by: Sven Bergström
- Constituency: Gävleborg County

Personal details
- Born: 24 June 1961 (age 65) Svegs Parish, Härjedalen Municipality, Härjedalen, Jämtland County, Sweden
- Party: Center Party
- Parents: Erland Jonsson; Elisabet Jonsson, (né Persson)
- Profession: Politician, paediatrician

Olof Anders Wedin Jonsson, (born Jonsson 24 June 1961 in Svegs Parish, Härjedalen Municipality, Härjedalen, Jämtland County), is a Swedish politician and member of the Riksdag for the constituency Gävleborg County and the parliamentary leader of the Center Party. He takes up seat number 239 in the Riksdag and has been a member of the War Delegation since October 2014. Jonsson grew up in the village of Kälarne in eastern Jämtland, where he began his involvement in the Centre Party's youth organization, Centre Party Youth (CUF). Since September 2011, he has also been the first deputy chairman of the Center Party and its parliamentary leader in the Riksdag. At the beginning of 2020 he was the substitute leader of the Center Party, substituting for Annie Lööf during her parental leave.

== Biography ==
Anders W. Jonsson was born in Svegs Parish, Härjedalen, Jämtland County, and grew up in Kälarne and lives since the early 1990s on a farm in Hedesunda, in the southernmost part of Gävle Municipality, with his wife and two daughters.

During the 1990s, Jonsson trained as a pediatrician. During a 4-year-period he was director of the pediatric clinic in Gävle. Since 2006, he has been on leave as the chief physician at the same clinic in Gävle. He works approximately one weekend per month as a pediatrician.

During his teenaged years, he was active in the Center Party's Youth Organisation (CUF). The issues he considered most important at the time were the fight against apartheid and the opposition to nuclear power and the Social Democrats' relocation policy. He ended his time at CUF by being the union's first vice president between 1987 and 1989.

During the period 1989–1993, Jonsson was chairman of the National Council of Swedish Youth Organizations, LSU (Landsrådet för Sveriges Ungdomsorganisationer). Jonsson's political involvement then continued in the Center Party as a member of the municipal council and for nine years as district chairman in Gävleborg County.

== Tasks in the Riksdag ==
At the Center Party's party meeting in Åre, Anders W. Jonsson was appointed the party's 1st vice-chairman. In October 2011, Anders W. Jonsson was appointed group leader in the Riksdag. He succeeded Roger Tiefensee.

During the term of office 2006–2010, Jonsson worked as a negotiator at the Center Party's Coordination Office at the Prime Minister's Office. He was responsible for the Ministry of Social Affairs' issues and worked with issues dealt with by Minister of Social Affairs Göran Hägglund, Minister of the Elderly and Public Health Maria Larsson, and Minister of Social Insurance Cristina Husmark Pehrsson. In the 2010 parliamentary elections, Jonsson was elected to the Swedish Parliament and took a seat on the Riksdag's Health and Welfare Committee. He is also a member of the National Audit Office's board and a deputy on the Social Insurance Committee. His political interests mainly concern entrepreneurship, child policy, and healthcare.

Since the 2010 election, Jonsson has been a member of the Center Party's election analysis group, which, led by Annie Lööf, analyzed the previous term, the election movement, and the Center Party's election results in 2010. He was also chairman of the renewal group tasked with working on a renewed welfare policy.

== Term of office 2010–2014 ==
Jonsson was one out of three main candidates to take over the position as the party leader of the Center Party during the party meeting in Åre in September 2011. On 31 December 2011 Annie Lööf was nominated, and Jonsson took back his candidacy. At the meeting he was elected as vice-party leader.

== Term of office 2018–2022 ==
Jonsson has since the beginning of 2020 been a substitute for Annie Lööf as party leader since she is on parental leave. When Annie Lööf came back from her leave Jonsson continues his work as a regular member of the Riksdag and as the Parliamentary leader of the Center Party.

Party political offices
New title	First Deputy Leader of the Centre Party; 2011–2021	Succeeded by Linda Modig
Preceded by Roger Tiefensee	Parliamentary Leader of the Centre Party in the Riksdag; 2011–2022	Succeeded by Daniel Bäckström
