= War Delegation =

The War Delegation (Swedish: Krigsdelegationen, KD) is a standing committee of the Riksdag, with its functions enumerated in the Instrument of Government and the Riksdag Act, with the purpose of replacing the Riksdag as a whole whenever Sweden is at war or is otherwise exposed to a serious threat or crisis.

The War Delegation is chaired by the Speaker of the Riksdag and has fifty members who are elected following each general election, for a total of 51 members. The Delegation has roughly the same powers as the Riksdag, but may not call snap elections or suspend ordinary elections.

If Sweden is at war the members of the Advisory Council on Foreign Affairs can, if possible after consultation with the Prime minister of Sweden, enact that the delegation will take the place of the Riksdag. If the Advisory Council on Foreign Affairs is hindered to meet the Government of Sweden can decide the same. Since it is the member of the Advisory Council that makes the decision, the King of Sweden who is the president of the advisory council, does not partake in the decision.

If Sweden is in danger of war the decision to call the War Delegation is decided in unison between the Advisory Council on Foreign Affairs and the Prime minister. In order for it to have effect the Prime minister and at least 6 of the members of the Advisory Council must vote in its favor.

== Members ==
the Speaker of the Riksdag serves as the chair plus 50 other members, elected for the parliamentary electoral period.

For the current 2022–2026 electoral period, the 50 elected members are:

=== Leadership ===
- Andreas Norlén (M) — Chair
- Morgan Johansson (S) — First Deputy Chair
- Julia Kronlid (SD) — Second Deputy Chair
- Kerstin Lundgren (C) — Third Deputy Chair

=== Members ===
- Jimmie Åkesson (SD)
- Magdalena Andersson (S)
- Ulf Kristersson (M)
- Peter Hultqvist (S)
- Lena Hallengren (S)
- Tobias Billström (M)
- Mattias Bäckström Johansson (SD)
- Matilda Ernkrans (S)
- Elisabeth Svantesson (M)
- Mikael Damberg (S)
- Ebba Busch (KD)
- Anna-Caren Sätherberg (S)
- Henrik Vinge (SD)
- Niklas Karlsson (S)
- Hans Wallmark (M)
- Gunilla Svantorp (S)
- Johan Pehrson (L)
- Ardalan Shekarabi (S)
- Aron Emilsson (SD)
- Ida Karkiainen (S)
- Jessika Roswall (M)
- Fredrik Lundh Sammeli (S)
- Sven-Olof Sällström (SD)
- Jennie Nilsson (S)
- Pål Jonson (M)
- Alexander Wasberg (S)
- Oscar Sjöstedt (SD)
- Anders Ygeman (S)
- Karin Enström (M)
- Nooshi Dadgostar (V)
- Jakob Forssmed (KD)
- Ida Gabrielsson (V)
- Matheus Enholm (SD)
- Samuel Gonzalez Westling (V)
- Maria Malmer Stenergard (M)
- Vasiliki Tsouplaki (V)
- Markus Wiechel (SD)
- Annie Lööf (C)
- Mats Persson (L)
- Daniel Bäckström (C)
- Margareta Cederfelt (M)
- Ulrika Heie (C)
- Björn Söder (SD)
- Jan Ericson (M)
- Per Bolund (MP)
- Dennis Dioukarev (SD)
- Märta Stenevi (MP)

== See also ==
- Government of Sweden
- Monarchy of Sweden
- Elverum Authorization (Declaration of the Storting in Norway during World War II)
