= Gellerman =

Gellerman is a surname. Notable people with the surname include:

- Helena Gellerman (born 1960), Swedish politician
- Kerstin Gellerman (1926–1987), Swedish politician

== See also ==
- Gellermann
- Gillerman
