= Daniel Lönn =

Swedish politician (born 2001)

Member of the Riksdag
- In office 18 January 2023 – 31 March 2023
- Preceded by: Mats Nordberg
- Succeeded by: Sara Gille
- Constituency: Dalarna County

Personal details
- Born: Carl Daniel Hardy Lönn; 18 August 2001 (age 25) Borlänge, Sweden
- Party: Sweden Democrats

Carl Daniel Hardy Lönn (born 18 August 2001) is a Swedish politician of the Sweden Democrats party who was substitute Member of the Riksdag in 2023, serving due to parental leave of Sara Gille. He represented the Dalarna County constituency.

Lönn was born in Borlänge. He worked for one year as a school teacher before becoming a local authority worker and later a parliamentary assistant to SD representative Mats Nordberg. He is chairman of the Young Swedes SDU in Dalarna and is a member of the regional council of Borlänge. In 2023, Lönn was appointed to the Riksdag following the death of Mats Nordberg. However, he was allocated to take Sara Gille's seat due to the latter being on maternity leave while Rasmus Giertz would take Nordberg's seat.

== See also ==
- List of members of the Riksdag, 2022–2026
- Baby of the house
