= Mariya Voyvodova =

Bulgarian-born Swedish politician (born 1978)

Member of the Riksdag
- In office 8 January 2024 – 12 June 2024
- Succeeded by: Amalia Rud Pedersen
- Constituency: Gothenburg Municipality

Personal details
- Born: 13 August 1978 (age 47) Bulgaria
- Party: Social Democratic Party

Mariya Voyvodova (born 13 August 1978) is a Bulgarian-born Swedish politician from the Swedish Social Democratic Party. She was briefly a member of parliament in 2024.

She was a deputy mayor for the city of Gothenburg.

== See also ==
- List of members of the Riksdag, 2022–2026
