= Lewerentz =

Lewerentz is a surname with German roots. Other spelling includes "Leverentz".

== People with the surname ==
- Joanna Lewerentz (born 1992), Swedish politician
- Sigurd Lewerentz (1885–1975), Swedish architect

== See also ==
- Lewerenz, Steven
