= Mona Smedman =

Swedish politician (born 1975)

Member of the Riksdag
- Incumbent
- Assumed office 1 January 2024
- Constituency: Värmland County

Personal details
- Born: Gun Mona Maria Jonasson; 7 July 1975 (age 51) Säffle, Sweden
- Party: Centre Party

Gun Mona Maria Smedman (nee Jonasson; born 7 July 1975) is a Swedish politician from the Centre Party. She has been a member of the Riksdag since 1 January 2024.

Smedman has a background in municipal and regional politics.

She was a candidate in the 2022 Swedish general election and became a substitute. She served as a substitute for Daniel Bäckström from 1 January to 31 May 2024.

In the Riksdag, Smedman is a deputy member of the Committee on Health and Welfare and the Committee on Education. In April 2026, she resigned her local position in Arvika.

== See also ==
- List of members of the Riksdag, 2022–2026
