= Frida Tånghag =

Swedish politician (born 1989)

Member of the Riksdag
- Incumbent
- Assumed office 28 September 2026
- Constituency: Gothenburg Municipality
- In office 9 January 2023 – 14 May 2023

Personal details
- Born: 15 January 1989 (age 37) Gothenburg, Sweden
- Party: Left Party

Frida Kristin Maria Tånghag (born 15 January 1989) is a Swedish politician for the Left Party. She has been a member of the Riksdag since 2026, elected for the Gothenburg Municipality constituency.

Tånghag ran as a candidate for the 2022 Swedish general election and became a substitute, and acted as an acting substitute for Tony Haddou in 2023. In the Riksdag, Tånghag was a deputy member of the Committee on Foreign Affairs and an additional deputy member of the Committee on the Labour Market and the Committee on Social Insurance.

== Biography ==
Tånghag was born in 1989 in Gothenburg and grew up in Majorna. She has also lived in England and Stockholm.

=== Professional life and union involvement ===
Tånghag has worked as a chef. In 2020, she worked as a chef at Gothia Towers in Gothenburg and was also involved in the workplace's club within the Swedish Hotel and Restaurant Workers' Union.

== Political career ==
Tånghag became politically active in the Left Party during the 2010s. She was appointed as a member of the Gothenburg City Council in 2018, succeeding Helen Edenryd. She later held positions in the Socialnämnd Nordost. During the 2022–2026 term, Tånghag was a substitute member of the Gothenburg City Council. She is also the first vice-chairman of the board of the municipal company Liseberg.

=== Riksdag ===
Tånghag was the first deputy for the Left Party in the Gothenburg municipality constituency after the 2022 Swedish general election. On 9 January 2023, she began serving as a member of parliament as a substitute for Tony Haddou, who had taken paternity leave, until 14 May 2023. During her time in the Riksdag, Tånghag was a deputy member of the Committee on Foreign Affairs and an additional deputy member of the Committee on the Labour Market and the Committee on Social Insurance. She participated, among other things, in the Riksdag's consideration of issues regarding immigration and foreign workers.

== See also ==
- List of members of the Riksdag, 2022–2026
- List of members of the Riksdag, 2026–2030
