= Marielle Lahti =

Swedish politician (born 1969)

Member of the Riksdag for Södermanland County
- Incumbent
- Assumed office 1 November 2022
- Preceded by: Linus Lakso

Personal details
- Born: 5 February 1969 (age 56)
- Party: Green Party

Karin Marielle Lahti (born 5 February 1969) is a Swedish politician from the Green Party.

== See also ==
- List of members of the Riksdag, 2022–2026
