= Anette Rangdag =

Swedish politician (born 1962)

Member of the Riksdag for Jämtland County
- In office 12 November 2022 – 12 December 2022
- Preceded by: Josef Fransson
- Succeeded by: Josef Fransson

Personal details
- Born: Anette Mari Regina Rangdag; 19 April 1962 (age 64) Boo Parish, Stockholm County, Sweden
- Party: Sweden Democrats

Anette Mari Regina Rangdag (born 19 April 1962) is a Swedish politician from the Sweden Democrats.

== See also ==
- List of members of the Riksdag, 2022–2026
