= Lars Püss =

Swedish politician

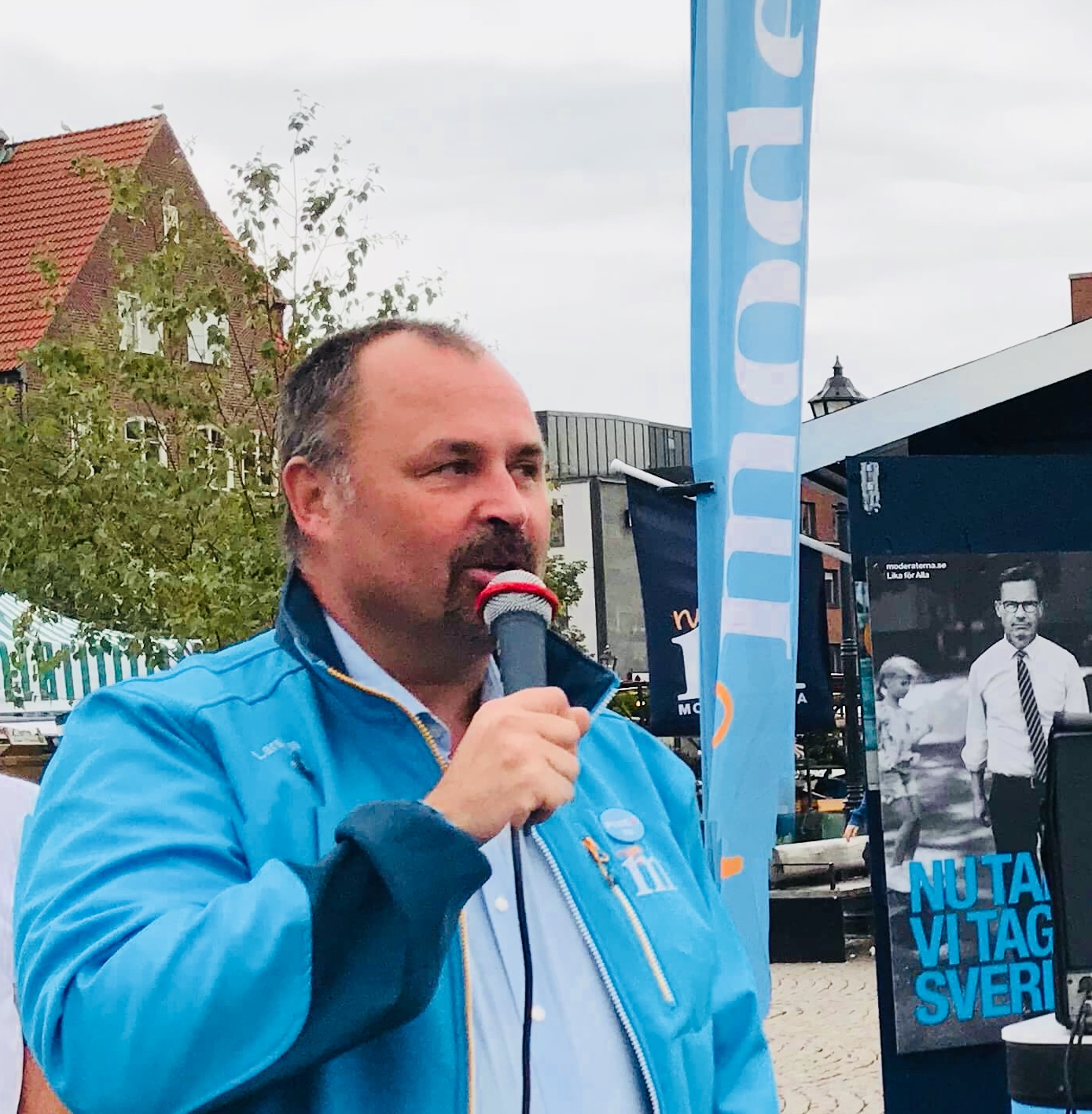
- Lars Püss in 2018

Member of the Riksdag
- In office 24 September 2018 – 14 October 2026
- Constituency: Halland County

Personal details
- Born: 15 February 1966 (age 60) Malmöhus County, Sweden
- Party: Moderate Party

Lars Peeter Püss (born 15 February 1966) is a Swedish politician from the Moderate Party, who was a member of the Riksdag from 2018 to 2026, elected for the Halland County constituency. Püss is a graduate in economics. Since 2021, Püss has been the county union chairman of the Moderates in Halland.

== Biography ==
Püss previously worked in the financial industry at Handelsbanken, Swedbank and Nordea as an institutional broker and asset manager in Stockholm and Luxembourg, but also as a technical salesperson in the IT industry in Stockholm and London. He has been a municipal politician in Halmstad and a regional politician in Halland since 2006 and has, among other things, been chairman of the environmental committee, the technology & leisure committee, Halmstads Rådhus AB and vice chairman of the municipal board's urban planning committee.

During the 2014–2018 term of office, Püss served as a substitute in the Riksdag on two occasions, and was then a deputy member of the Committee on the Labour Market, the Committee on Defence, and the Committee on Health and Welfare. From the 2018 election, he served as a deputy member of the Defense Committee. Since 2019, he has also been a member of the War Delegation and the Swedish Radiation Safety Authority's Transparency Council. In December 2019, Püss switched from the Defense Committee to the Committee on Education. In May 2020, Püss took a seat on the Transparency Council of the Swedish Schools Inspectorate. In January 2022, Püss switched from the Education Committee to the Committee on Civil Affairs. He has been a member of the Committee on Defence. He has been a member of the Export Control Council under the National Inspectorate of Strategic Products and the Swedish Customs and Excise Authority's Transparency Council since 2023.

== See also ==
- List of members of the Riksdag, 2018–2022
- List of members of the Riksdag, 2022–2026
