= Eleonore Lundkvist =

Swedish politician (born 1988)

Member of the Riksdag
- In office 25 March 2024 – 12 August 2024
- Constituency: Västmanland County

Personal details
- Born: 1988 (age 37–38) Västernorrland County, Sweden
- Party: Moderate Party

Lilian Eleonore Lundkvist (born 1988) is a Swedish politician from the Moderate Party who was a member of the Riksdag.

She specialises in education policy. She chairs the Moderates in Västerås.

== See also ==
- List of members of the Riksdag, 2022–2026
