= Louise Mörk =

Swedish politician (born 1993)

Member of the Riksdag
- In office 26 September 2022 – 18 October 2022
- Constituency: Norrbotten County

Personal details
- Born: 1993 (age 32–33) Norrbotten County, Sweden
- Party: Social Democrats

Åse Louise Mörk (née Fredriksson; born 1993) is a Swedish politician from the Social Democrats who was a member of the Riksdag.

She and her husband have one child. She was chairwoman of the children and youth committee in Piteå.

== See also ==
- List of members of the Riksdag, 2022–2026
