= Committee on Social Insurance =

Swedish parliamentary committee

The (Parliamentary) Committee on Social Insurance (Swedish: Socialförsäkringsutskottet, SfU) is a parliamentary committee in the Swedish Riksdag. The committee's areas of responsibility concern health insurance, pensions, policies on families, asylum, human migration, integration policies for newly arrived migrants, along with Swedish citizenship.

The Speaker of the committee is Viktor Wärnick from the Moderate Party and the vice-Speaker is Tony Haddou from the Left Party.

== List of speakers for the committee ==
Name	Period	Political party
Sven Aspling	1976-1985	Social Democratic Party
Doris Håvik	1985–1991	Social Democratic Party
Gullan Lindblad	1991–1994	Moderate Party
Maj-Inger Klingvall	1994–1996	Social Democratic Party
Börje Nilsson	1996–1998	Social Democratic Party
Berit Andnor	1998–2002	Social Democratic Party
Tomas Eneroth	2002–2006	Social Democratic Party
Gunnar Axén	2006-2014	Moderate Party
Fredrik Lundh Sammeli	2014–2018	Social Democratic Party
Johan Forssell	2018–2019	Moderate Party
Maria Malmer Stenergard	2019–2022	Moderate Party
Jessica Rosencrantz	2022–2023	Moderate Party
Viktor Wärnick	2023	Moderate Party
Jessica Rosencrantz	2023–2024	Moderate Party
Viktor Wärnick	2024–	Moderate Party

== List of vice-speakers for the committee ==
Name	Period	Political party
Gullan Lindblad	1994-1998	Moderate Party
Bo Könberg	1998–2002	Liberal People's Party
Sven Brus	2002–2006	Christian Democrats
Tomas Eneroth	2006–2008	Social Democratic Party
Veronica Palm	2008–2010	Social Democratic Party
Tomas Eneroth	2010–2014	Social Democratic Party
Elisabeth Svantesson	2014	Moderate Party
Johan Forssell	2014–2018	Moderate Party
Rikard Larsson	2018–2022	Social Democratic Party
Ida Gabrielsson	2022–2024	Left Party
Tony Haddou	2024–	Left Party
