= Jennie Wernäng =

Swedish politician (born 1985)

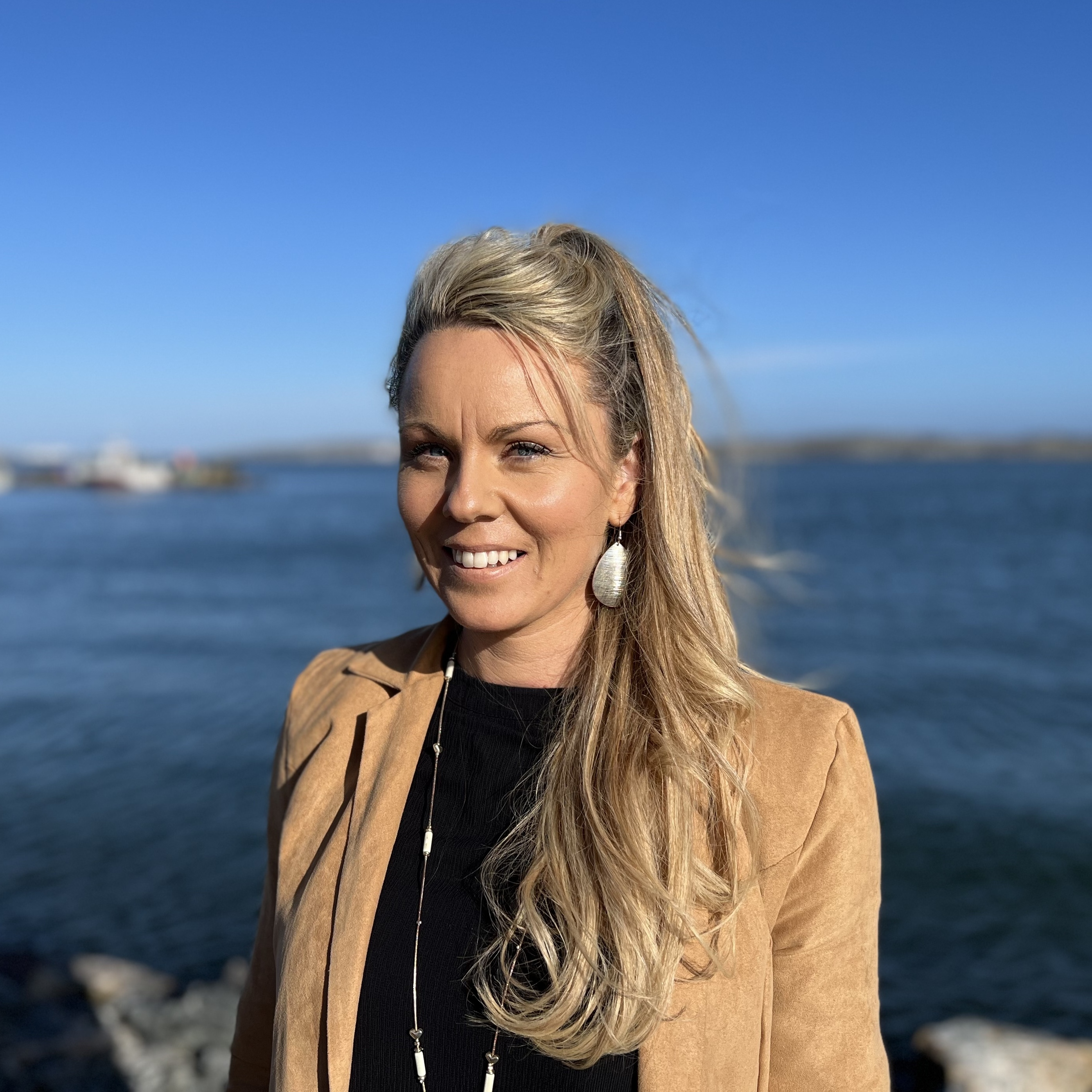

Member of the Riksdag
- In office 2022–2026
- Constituency: Västra Götaland County West

Personal details
- Born: 18 April 1985 (age 41)
- Party: Moderate Party

Jennie Lisbeth Wernäng (born 1985) is a Swedish politician from the Moderate Party. She was a member of the Riksdag from 2022 to 2026.

She was a candidate in the 2018 Swedish local elections.

== See also ==
- List of members of the Riksdag, 2022–2026
