= Susanne Nordström =

Swedish politician (born 1963)

Member of the Riksdag
- Incumbent
- Assumed office 2022
- Constituency: Östergötland County

Personal details
- Born: 16 April 1963 (age 63) Eskilstuna, Sweden
- Party: Moderate Party

Susanne Christina Nordström (born 16 April 1963) is a Swedish politician from the Moderate Party. She has been a member of the Riksdag since the 2022 general election.

== See also ==
- List of members of the Riksdag, 2022–2026
