= Mattias Bäckström Johansson =

Swedish politician (born 1985)

Mattias Bäckström Johansson SD
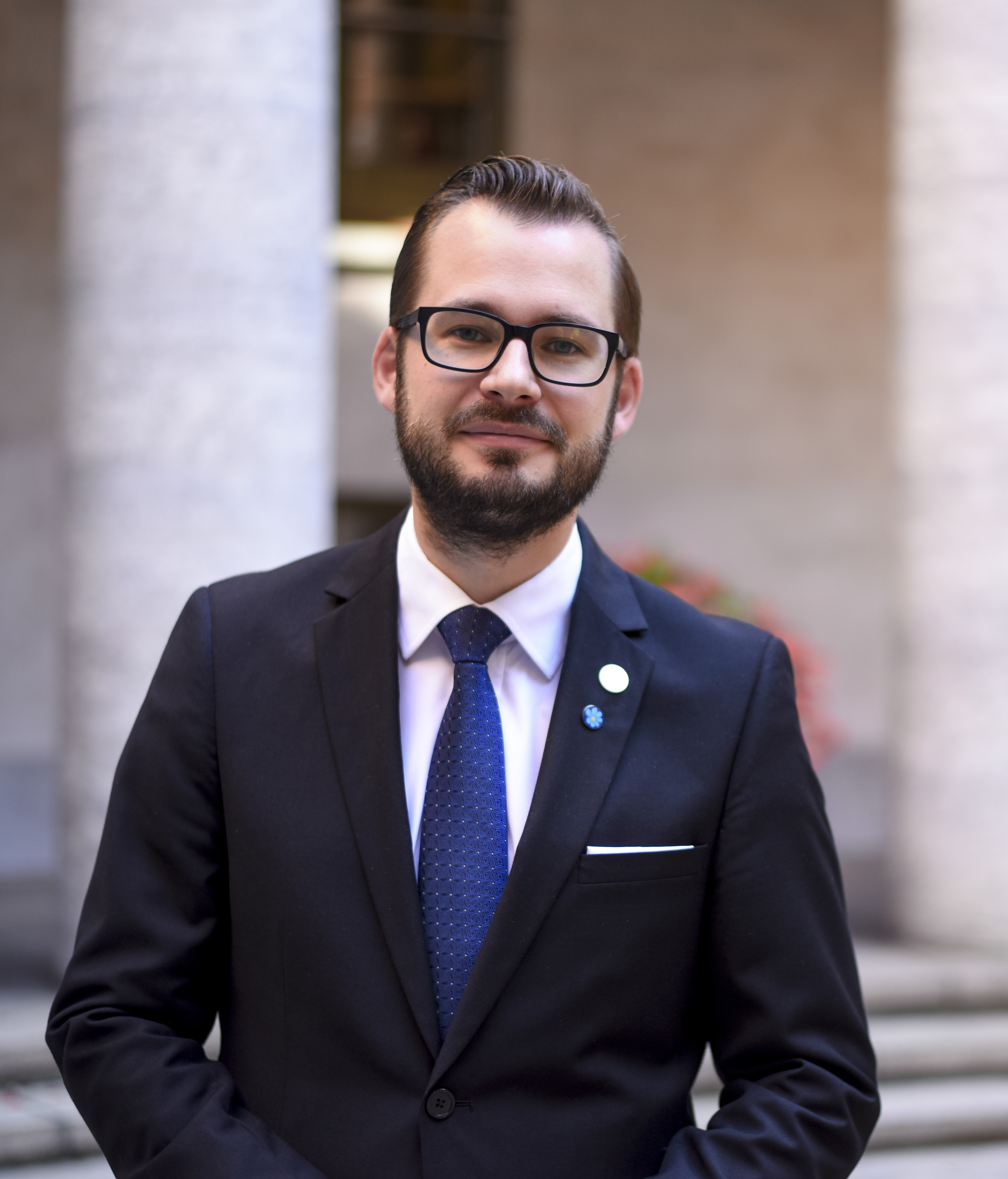

Secretary-General of the Sweden Democrats
- Incumbent
- Assumed office 17 October 2022
- Party Leader: Jimmie Åkesson
- Preceded by: Richard Jomshof

Deputy Leader of the Sweden Democrats in the Riksdag
- In office 25 November 2019 – 25 October 2022
- Party Leader: Jimmie Åkesson
- Riksdag Leader: Henrik Vinge
- Preceded by: Henrik Vinge
- Succeeded by: Linda Lindberg

Member of the Riksdag
- Incumbent
- Assumed office 29 September 2014
- Constituency: Kalmar County (2018– ) Västernorrland County (2014–2018)

Personal details
- Born: Anders Torleif Mattias Bäckström Johansson; 25 July 1985 (age 41) Järfälla, Sweden
- Party: Sweden Democrats
- Other political affiliations: Moderate Party (until 2000)
- Spouse: Rebecka Fallenkvist
- Parents: Torleif Johansson; Cecilia Bäckström
- Education: Kalmar Maritime University (Linnaeus University)
- Occupation: Reactor operator

Anders Torleif Mattias Bäckström Johansson (born 25 July 1985) is a Swedish politician of the Sweden Democrats. He has served as Secretary-General of the Sweden Democrats since 2022, having previously served as Deputy Leader of the Sweden Democrats in the Riksdag from 2019 to 2022. He has been Member of the Riksdag since September 2014, representing Västernorrland County from 2014 to 2018, and Kalmar County from 2018 onwards. He currently takes up seat number 256 in the Riksdag.

== Biography ==
Bäckström Johansson was born in 1985 in Oskarshamn. He studied marine engineering at the Kalmar Maritime University (a branch of Linnaeus University) and worked as a power station reactor operator at the Oskarshamn Nuclear Power Plant until his election to the Riksdag.

He has two children from a previous marriage and according to a profile in Aftonbladet has been in a relationship with media personality Rebecka Fallenkvist since 2023.

== Political career ==
Bäckström Johansson was a member of the Moderate Youth League, the youth-wing of the Moderate Party until 2000 and then joined the Sweden Democratic Youth in 2002. He is a member of the municipal council for Oskarshamn Municipality for the Sweden Democrats, having first been elected in 2006. From 2010 until 2014 Bäckström Johansson was also a member of the regional council for Kalmar County.

He was first elected to the Riksdag during the 2014 Swedish general election and has been a member of the Industry and Trade Committee since. He is also a member of War Delegation since April 2020, and a member of the Valprövningsnämnden (The Election Review Board) since March 2019, a position he was previously an alternate for.

Party political offices
Preceded by Henrik Vinge	Deputy Leader of the Sweden Democrats in the Riksdag; 2019–2022	Succeeded by Linda Lindberg
Preceded by Richard Jomshof	Secretary-General of the Sweden Democrats; 2022–	Incumbent
