= Lena Bäckelin =

Swedish politician (born 1964)

Member of the Riksdag
- In office 26 September 2022 – 18 October 2022
- Succeeded by: Anna-Caren Sätherberg
- Constituency: Jämtland County

Personal details
- Born: 1964 (age 61–62) Stockholm, Sweden
- Party: Social Democratic

Lena Bäckelin (born 1964) is a Swedish politician from the Swedish Social Democratic Party. She was a member of the parliament in 2022.

== See also ==
- List of members of the Riksdag, 2022–2026
