= Paula Örn =

Swedish politician (born 1978)

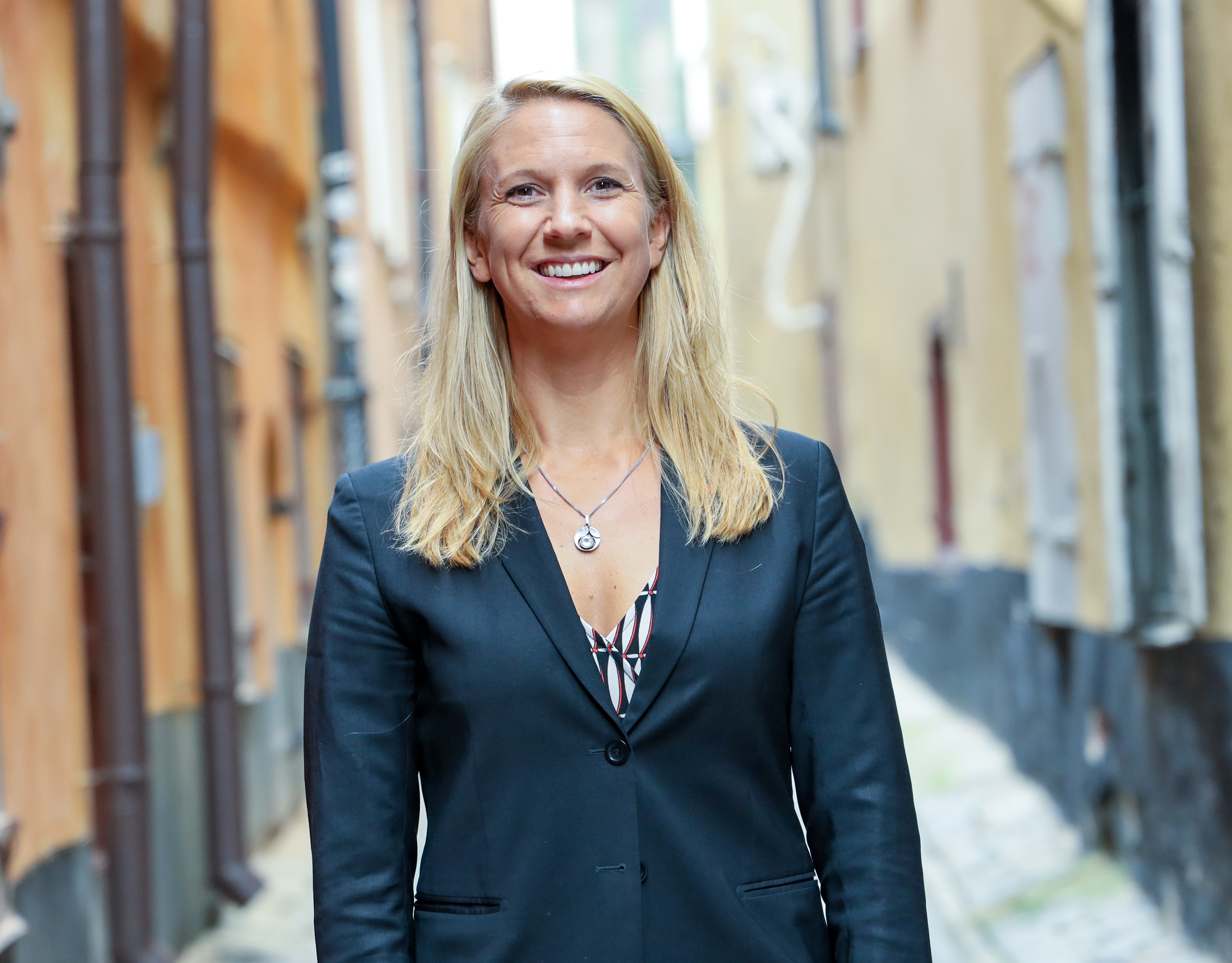
- Örn in 2022

Member of the Riksdag
- In office 30 January 2024 – 29 November 2024
- Preceded by: Aylin Fazelian
- Succeeded by: Aylin Fazelian
- Constituency: Västra Götaland County West
- In office 1 July 2021 – 17 December 2021
- Preceded by: Aylin Fazelian
- Succeeded by: Aylin Fazelian
- Constituency: Västra Götaland County West

Personal details
- Born: 25 August 1978 (age 47)
- Party: Social Democratic Party

Sara Paula Charlotta Örn (born 25 August 1978) is a Swedish politician. She was a member of the Riksdag in 2021 and 2024. From 2014 to 2018, she served as mayor of Ale.
