= Martin Westmont =

Swedish politician (born 1978)

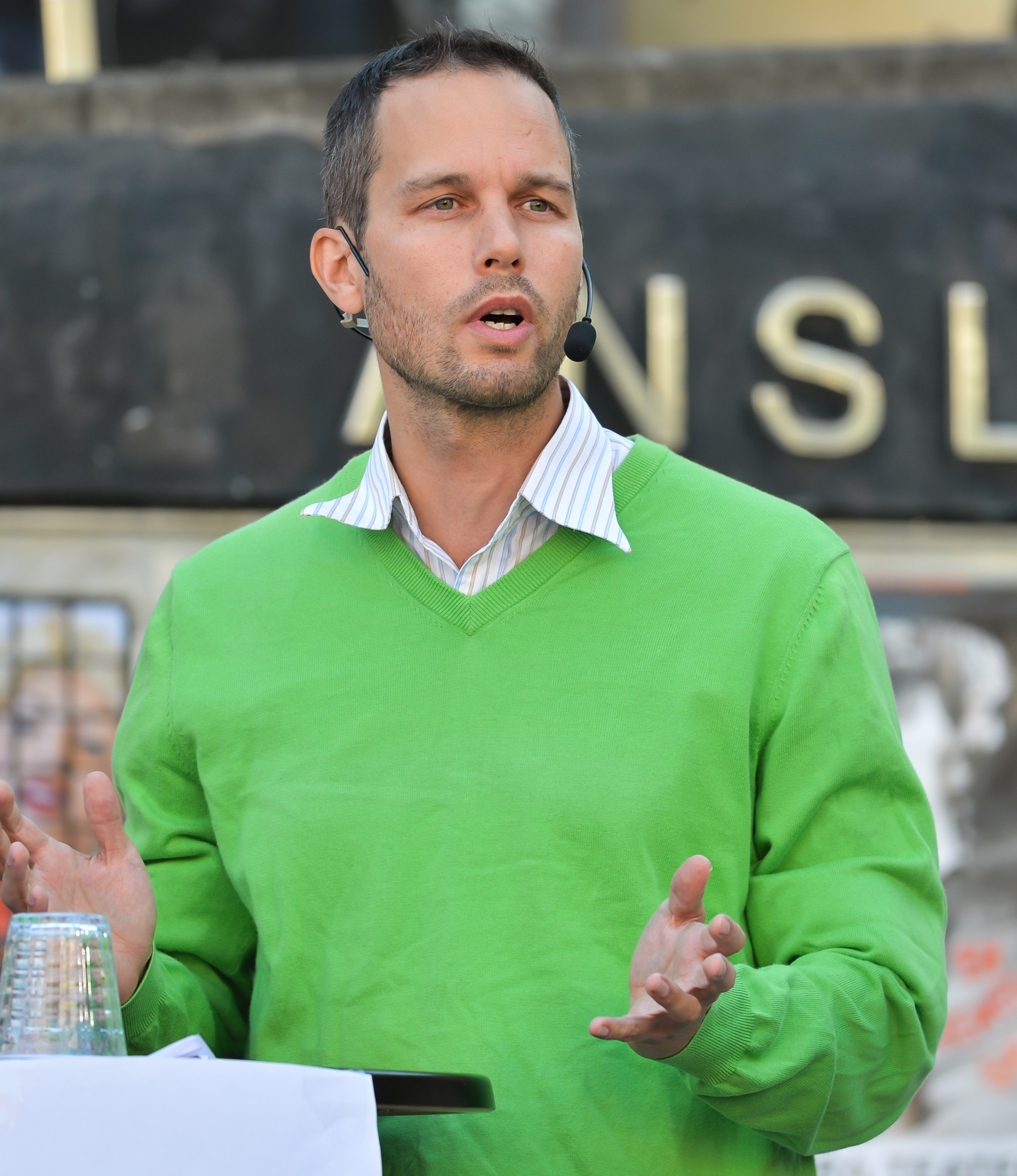
- Westmont at Stockholm City Hall
- Incumbent
- Assumed office 2017

Regional Councilor for Stockholm County

Member of the Riksdag
- Incumbent
- Assumed office 12 October 2022
- Preceded by: Gabriel Kroon
- Constituency: Stockholm Municipality

Personal details
- Born: 30 October 1978 (age 47) Västerhaninge, Stockholm County, Sweden
- Party: Sweden Democrats

Martin Westmont (born 30 October 1978) is a Swedish politician and former school teacher who has served as a Member of the Riksdag for the Sweden Democrats party since 2022. He represents the Stockholm Municipality constituency.

Westmont stood for the Sweden Democrats in the 2022 Swedish general election but was not elected, and instead served as a substitute to Gabriel Kroon. In October 2022, he was appointed to the Riksdag after Kroon resigned to focus on his leadership of the SD chapter in Stockholm. In the Riksdag, Westmont serves as a member of the civil and EU committees. He is also a regional councilor in Stockholm County where he serves on the board of education.

== See also ==
- List of members of the Riksdag, 2022–2026
