= Gabriel Kroon =

Swedish politician (born 1996)

Gabriel Eugen Kroon
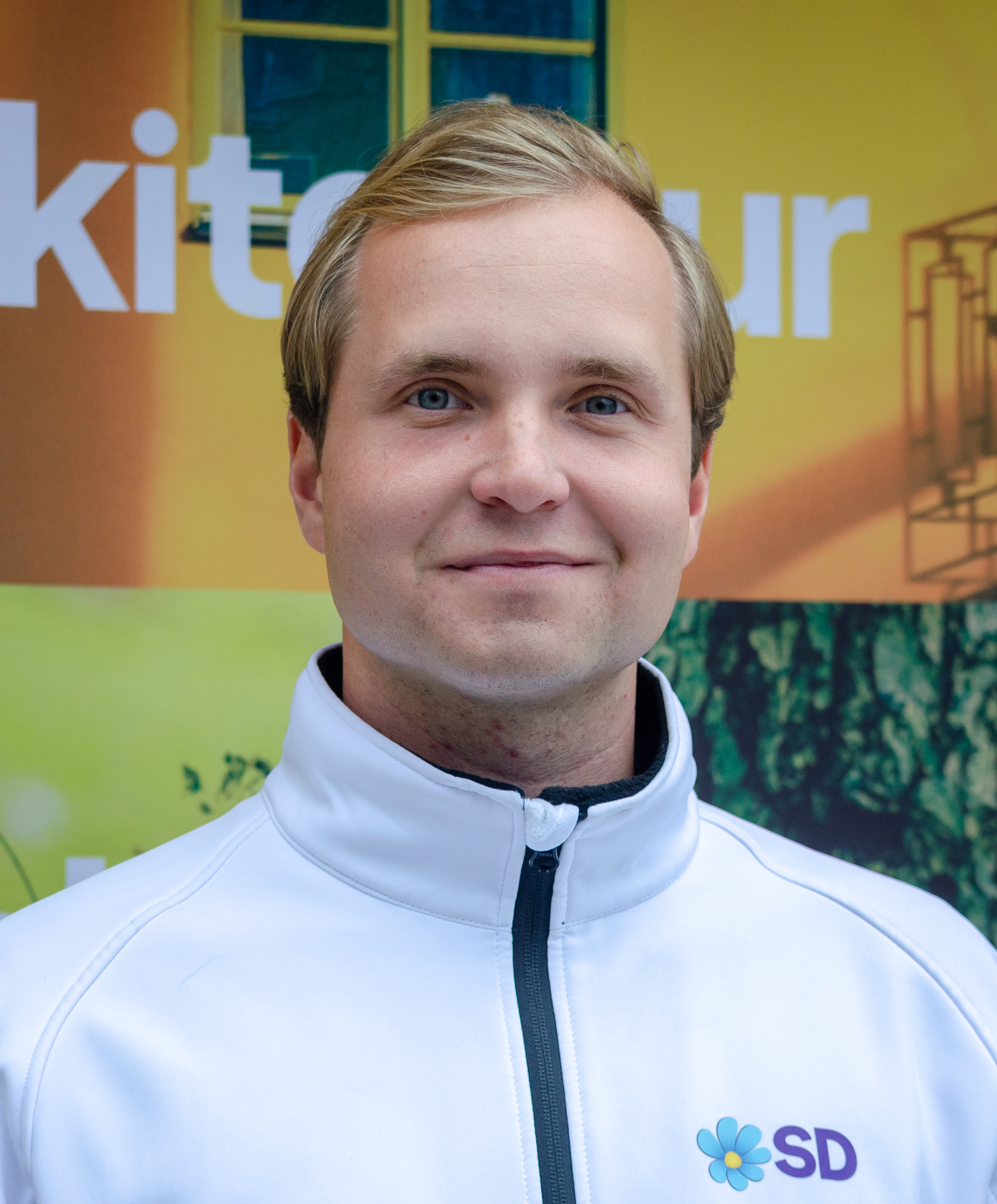
- Incumbent
- Assumed office 2018

Group leader of the Sweden Democrats on Stockholm Municipal Council

Member of the Riksdag
- In office 26 September 2022 – 12 October 2022
- Succeeded by: Martin Westmont
- Constituency: Stockholm Municipality

Personal details
- Born: 11 July 1996 (age 30) Finland
- Party: Sweden Democrats
- Education: King's College London; Karolinska Institute

Gabriel Eugen Kroon (born 7 November 1996 in Finland) is a Swedish politician representing the Sweden Democrats party, who served as member of the Riksdag for the Stockholm Municipality constituency in 2022.

== Biography ==
Kroon was born in 1996 in Finland and grew up in the Östermalm area of Stockholm. Kroon's parents emigrated from the Soviet Union to Sweden in the 1980s. He holds a master's degree in international politics from King's College London and a degree in health and policy management from the Karolinska Institutet. He also studied part-time for a diploma in economics at the EU Business School while living and working in Munich. After graduating, he worked as a civil servant in the Riksdag Chancellory for the Ministry of Finance Kroon's younger brother Julian Kroon is the chairman of the Konservativa Förbundet (Conservative Union) student organisation.

In 2018, he was elected to Stockholm county council and served on the regional health board. In 2022, he was appointed the SD's leader and spokesman on Stockholm Municipal Council. For the 2022 Swedish general election, Kroon stood as a candidate in the constituency of Stockholm Municipality and was elected to the Riksdag. After his election, Kroon stated that he would not take up his seat in order to focus entirely on his leadership of the SD in Stockholm. He turned his seat over to Martin Westmont.

Kroon is together with his father and other relatives active as owner or board member in a large number of businesses in Switzerland, Sweden and Finland. Kroon himself can be linked to 18 companies during recent years, in industries ranging from construction to sales of electric vehicles and publishing.

== See also ==
- List of members of the Riksdag, 2022–2026
