= Fredrik Saweståhl =

Swedish politician (born 1977)

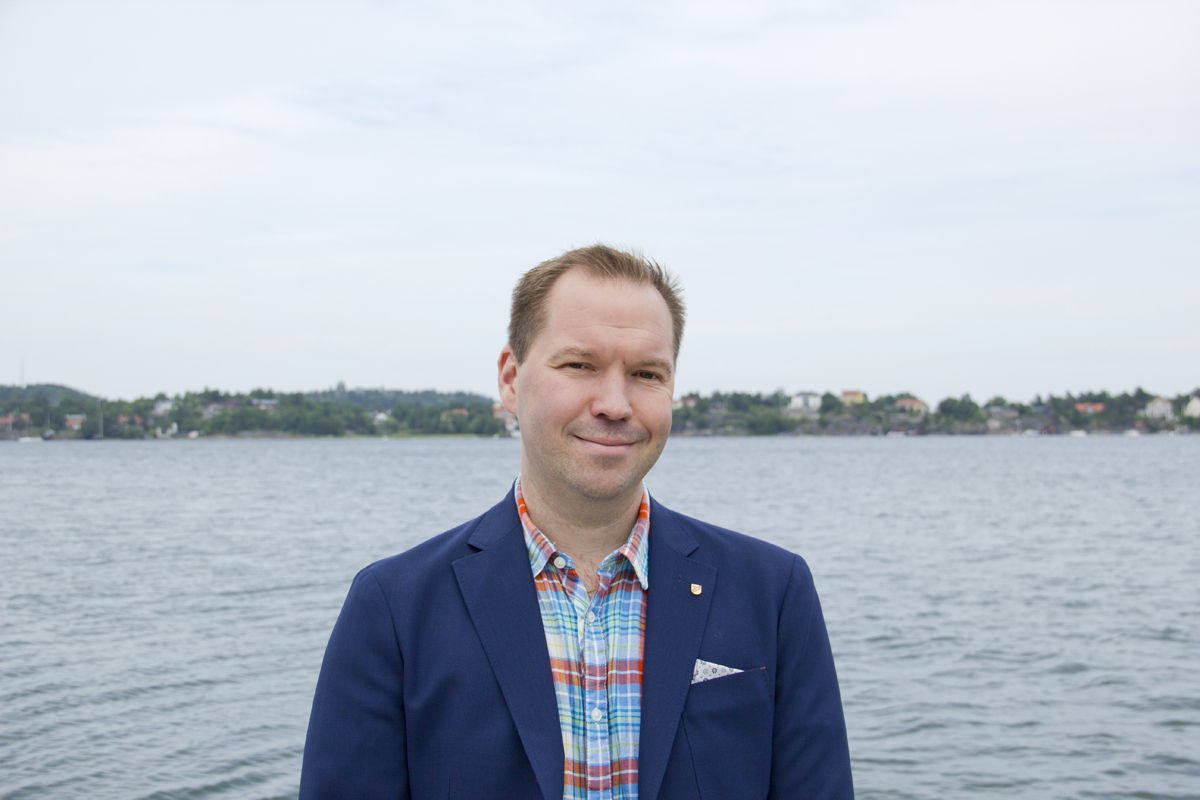
- Saweståhl in 2016

Member of the Riksdag
- Incumbent
- Assumed office 6 September 2024
- Preceded by: Magdalena Schröder
- Constituency: Stockholm County
- In office 1 March 2023 – 31 May 2023
- Preceded by: Magdalena Schröder
- Succeeded by: Magdalena Schröder
- Constituency: Stockholm County

Personal details
- Born: 13 September 1977 (age 48)
- Party: Moderate Party

Fredrik Saweståhl (born 13 September 1977) is a Swedish politician. He has been a member of the Riksdag since 2024, having previously served from March to May in 2023. From 2009 to 2018, he served as mayor of Tyresö.
