= Roger Tiefensee =

Swedish politician (born 1967)

Roger Tiefensee (born 1967) is a Swedish Centre Party politician, member of the Riksdag since 2002. After the 2006 Swedish general election, he was named the Centre Party's parliamentary group leader.
