= Mats Nordberg =

Swedish politician (1958–2023)

Member of the Riksdag
- In office 2018–2023
- Constituency: Dalarna County

Personal details
- Born: 14 April 1958 Falun, Sweden
- Died: 15 January 2023 (aged 64)
- Party: Sweden Democrats
- Occupation: Politician, tree surgeon.

Mats Nordberg (14 April 1958 – 15 January 2023) was a Swedish politician and member of the Riksdag representing the Sweden Democrats party for the constituency of Dalarna County. Nordberg also worked as a tree surgeon and in forestry. He served on Committee on the Environment, Public Health and Consumer Policy in the Swedish parliament.

Nordberg died in office on 15 January 2023, at the age of 64 after a period of illness. His Riksdag seat was taken over by Daniel Lönn and later Rasmus Giertz.
