= Tony Haddou =

Swedish politician (born 1989)

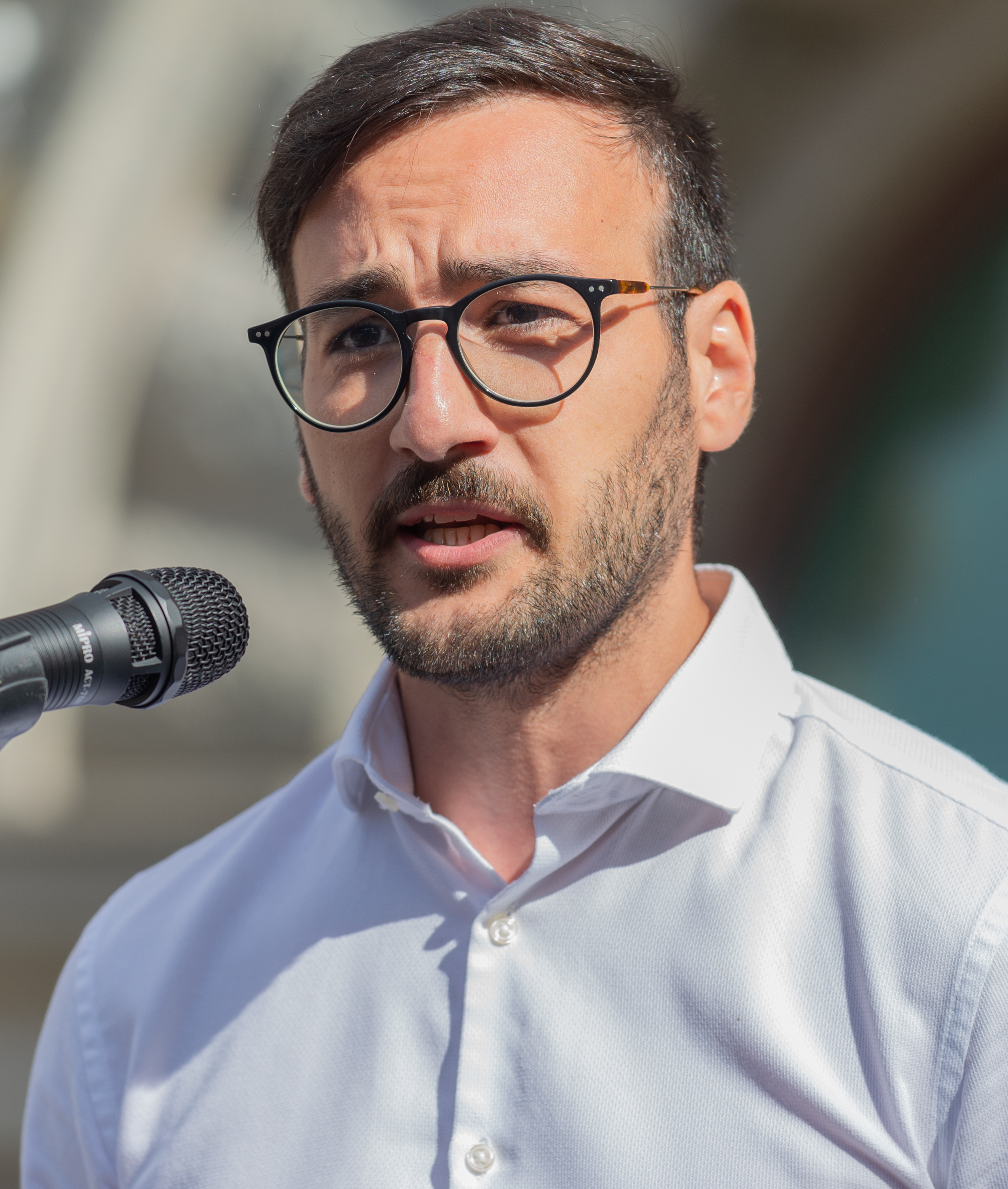

Member of the Riksdag
- In office 24 September 2018 – 2026
- Constituency: Gothenburg Municipality

Personal details
- Born: 1989 (age 36–37)
- Party: Left Party

Tony Haddou (born 1989) is a Swedish politician. In the 2018 Swedish general election he was elected as a member of the Riksdag representing the constituency of Gothenburg Municipality. He was re-elected at the 2022 Swedish general election. In 2023, Haddou took paternity leave and was replaced by substitute Frida Tånghag.

== See also ==
- List of members of the Riksdag, 2018–2022
- List of members of the Riksdag, 2022–2026
