= Lou Gellermann =

American collegiate athlete, coach, and announcer

- Born: August 18, 1936
- Died: April 13, 2016 (aged 79)
- Education: Washington (1958)
- Occupation: Public address announcer

Lou Gellermann (18 August 1936 – 13 May 2016) was a collegiate athlete, coach, and public address announcer for the University of Washington (UW) Huskies from 1985 until 2007. Gellermann welcomed Husky Stadium fans with his signature greeting "Hello, Dawg fans!", to which the fans responded "Hello, Lou!"

A Husky Hall of Fame rower (Inducted 2013), he rowed for all four of his undergraduate years, and was a member of the Huskies crew team that rowed at the Henley Royal Regatta in England, in 1958, as well as competing in Moscow, where the Huskies attained one of the greatest rowing victories in UW history.

That same year, he graduated with a communications degree. He went to the United States Naval Academy to coach the crew team before coming back to UW to coach the freshman in 1968.
