= Joanna Lewerentz =

Swedish politician (born 1992)

Member of the Riksdag
- In office 30 January 2023 – 22 April 2024
- Constituency: Stockholm County

Personal details
- Born: 19 November 1992 (age 33)
- Party: Moderate Party

Joanna Solveig Elisabeth Lewerentz Lundgren (born 19 November 1992) is a Swedish politician from the Moderate Party. She briefly served as Member of the Riksdag from 2023 to 2024.

== See also ==
- List of members of the Riksdag, 2022–2026
