= Michael Rubbestad =

Swedish politician (born 1980)

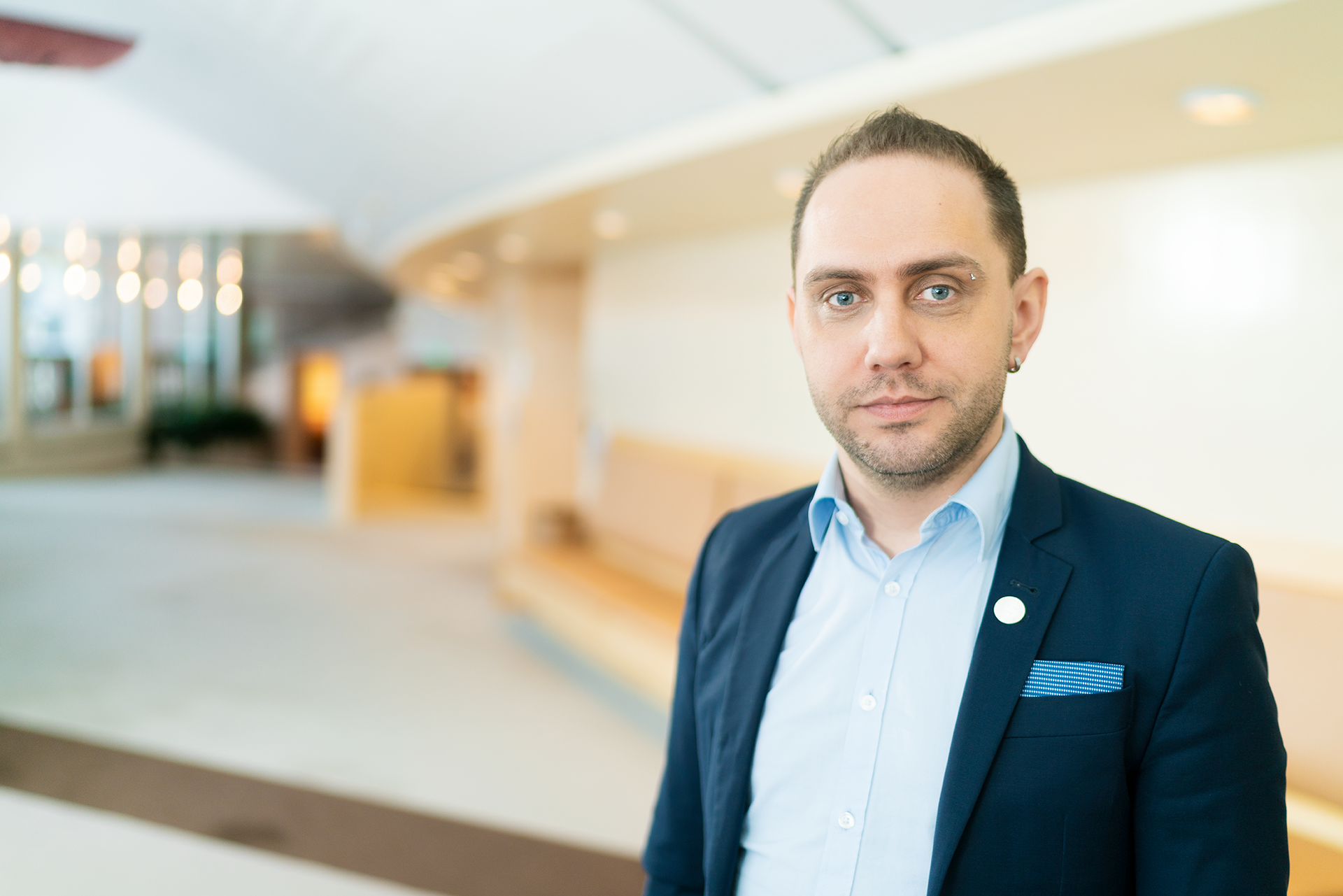

Deputy Leader of the Sweden Democrats in the Riksdag
- In office 26 April 2023 – 2 June 2026
- Party Leader: Jimmie Åkesson
- Riksdag Leader: Linda Lindberg
- Preceded by: Linda Lindberg
- Succeeded by: Matheus Enholm

Member of the Riksdag
- In office 24 September 2018 – 2 June 2026
- Constituency: Uppsala County

Personal details
- Born: 16 October 1980 (age 45) Stockholm
- Party: Sweden Democrats

Michael Per Axel Rubbestad (born 16 October 1980) is a Swedish politician and former musician who was elected as a member of the Riksdag in 2018 for the Sweden Democrats party. He resigned from his position on 2 June 2026 when he was investigated for crimes relating to child sexual abuse material.

== Biography ==
Rubbestad is a councilor in Håbo Municipality, and the Riksdag serves on the Committee on Cultural Affairs. In addition to politics, Rubbestad has worked as an actor.
