= Johanna Hornberger =

Swedish politician (born 1975)

Member of the Riksdag
- In office 18 October 2022 – 5 September 2024
- Preceded by: Tobias Billström
- Succeeded by: Tobias Billström
- Constituency: Stockholm County

Personal details
- Born: 28 March 1975 (age 51)
- Party: Moderate Party

Christina Johanna Hornberger (née Söderström; born 28 March 1975) is a Swedish politician serving as mayor of Danderyd since 2024. From 2022 to 2024, she was a member of the Riksdag.
