= Doris Håvik =

Swedish politician (1924–2009)

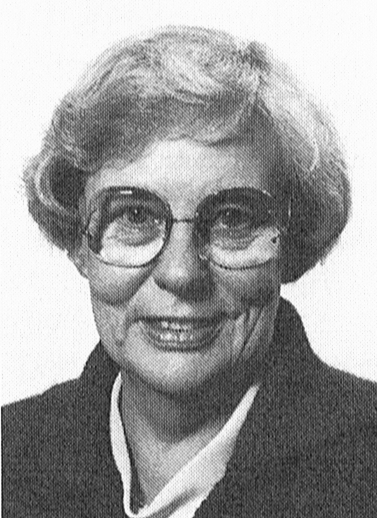
Doris Håvik

Inga Doris Helena Håvik (née Jansson; 1924–2009) was a working-class Swedish politician from Gothenburg. Representing the Swedish Social Democratic Party, from 1969 to 1994 she was a member of the Riksdag. Taking a special interest in social welfare, she was also active internationally, participating in meetings of the Nordic Council, the Council of Europe and the United Nations. Her awards included the Seraphim Blue Ribbon.

== Early life and family ==
Born on 20 October 1924 in the Majorna district of Gothenburg, Inga Doris Helena Jansson was the daughter of the tramway worker and unionist Oscar Jansson and his wife Ida Kristina. She completed her schooling following a teacher training programme at Majorna Elementary Training College for Girls (Majornas elementarläroverk för flickor). In 1945, she married Ingemar Håvik who was active politically and as a trade unionist. Together they had a son Malte (1950). Doris Håvik took a correspondence course in social work while she was on maternity leave.

== Career ==
From 1946, Håvik worked at the Swedish Social Insurance Agency. In the 1950s, she became a member of the agency's union (Försäkringskassans förbund) and joined the Social Democratic Party. Her duties included participating in work on child welfare and social welfare at the local level. She also took part in meetings of women's organizations, union groups and municipal gatherings where in particular she explained changes made in the social insurance programme. As a result, she gained popularity and was invited to stand for the 1968 election. Representing Gothenburg, she gained a seat initially in the lower house until 1970. She was subsequently directly elected to the Riksdag in 1971, 1974, 1976, 1979, 1982, 1985, 1988 and 1991. She thus served continuously from 1968 until 1994.

An active parliamentarian, she consistently sought to work towards better conditions for oppressed and poverty-stricken women but she also put forward proposals on improvements to life in Gothenburg. From 1982 to 1994, she contributed to the work of the Council of Europe where she also fought for minimum levels of support for the poor and for improved women's rights. Håvik was also Sweden's delegate to the United Nations in New York from 1976 to 1981 where she was a member of the social welfare committee.

Doris Håvid died in Gothenburg on 21 September 2009. She is buried in Värö's churchyard.

== Awards ==
In 1987, University of Gothenburg presented her their "Pro Arte et Scientia" award which in 1989 was followed by the City of Gothenburg Order of Merit (Göteborgs Stads förtjänsttecken) in 1989. In 1995, she was honoured with the Seraphim Blue Ribbon.
