= Kerstin Gellerman =

Kerstin Gellerman S

Member of the Swedish Parliament for Västra Götaland County North
- In office 1985–1987

Personal details
- Born: 5 June 1926 Skellefteå, Sweden
- Died: 10 August 1987 (aged 61) Skallsjö parish
- Party: Liberals
- Children: Helena Gellerman
- Profession: Politician

Kerstin Ingegerd Gellerman (née Lagerkvist; 5 June 1926 – 10 August 1987) was a Swedish pharmacist and politician (People's Party member). She married the researcher and editor Olle Gellerman in 1950. Their daughter Helena Gellerman became a Liberal member of the Riksdag in 2018.

Kerstin Gellerman, who was the daughter of the power plant director Emil Lagerkvist, graduated with a Bachelor of Pharmacy degree in 1948. She was a member of the Skallsjö municipal council from 1967 to 1968 and then (after the municipal merger) of the Lerum municipal council from 1969 to 1987, including as the council's second vice-chairman from 1983 to 1985.

She was a member of parliament for the constituency of Västra Götaland County North from 1985 to 1987. In the Riksdag, she was a member of the Agriculture Committee. She was primarily involved in issues of environmental protection and animal welfare. After her death, she was replaced in the Riksdag by Anders Castberger.

== See also ==
- List of former members of the Riksdag

== Sources ==
- Enkammarriksdagen 1971–1993/94. Ledamöter och valkretsar, band 2 (Sveriges riksdag 1996), s. 166–167
