= Linda Lindberg =

Swedish politician (born 1974)

Leader of the Sweden Democrats in the Riksdag
- Incumbent
- Assumed office 26 April 2023
- Leader: Jimmie Åkesson
- Preceded by: Henrik Vinge

Deputy Leader of the Sweden Democrats in the Riksdag
- In office 25 October 2022 – 26 April 2023
- Party Leader: Jimmie Åkesson
- Riksdag Leader: Henrik Vinge
- Preceded by: Mattias Bäckström Johansson
- Succeeded by: Michael Rubbestad

Member of the Riksdag
- Incumbent
- Assumed office 24 September 2018
- Constituency: Skåne County Western

Personal details
- Born: Linda Margaretha Nilsson; 2 November 1974 (age 51) Malmö, Sweden
- Party: Sweden Democrats
- Occupation: Politician, florist

Linda Margaretha Lindberg (née Nilsson; born 2 November 1974) is a Swedish politician of the Sweden Democrats and Member of the Riksdag since 2018. She has served as leader of the Sweden Democrats in the Riksdag since 2023.

== Biography ==
Lindberg ran a floristry business in Kågeröd. She currently lives in Helsingborg and is a mother of two. She has been active in the Sweden Democrats since 2012 and was elected to the party's national board in 2015. Between 2014 and 2018, she served as a municipal councilor in Svalöv Municipality. She also serves as the chairwoman of SD-women, the women's wing of the Sweden Democrats. Lindberg was elected to the Riksdag in 2018 and sits on the Committees of the EU, Foreign Affairs and Civil Affairs.

== Political work ==
In her role on the Riksdag Committee for the European Union, Lindberg has campaigned against EU pension system, EU influence over childcare policies in Sweden and called for the EU's power over member states to be "minimized."

She has stated that her interest in politics came about due to her disappointment in the Swedish Social Democrats and the Moderate Party. Lindberg has cited SD leader Jimmie Akesson as her political role model. and replaced Akesson as the official representative and speaker for the Sweden Democrats during Almedalen Week in 2023.

Party political offices
Preceded by Mattias Bäckström Johansson	Deputy Leader of the Sweden Democrats in the Riksdag; 2022–2023	Succeeded by Michael Rubbestad
Preceded by Henrik Vinge	Leader of the Sweden Democrats in the Riksdag; 2023–	Incumbent
