= Helena Gellerman =

Swedish politician

Helena Gellerman S
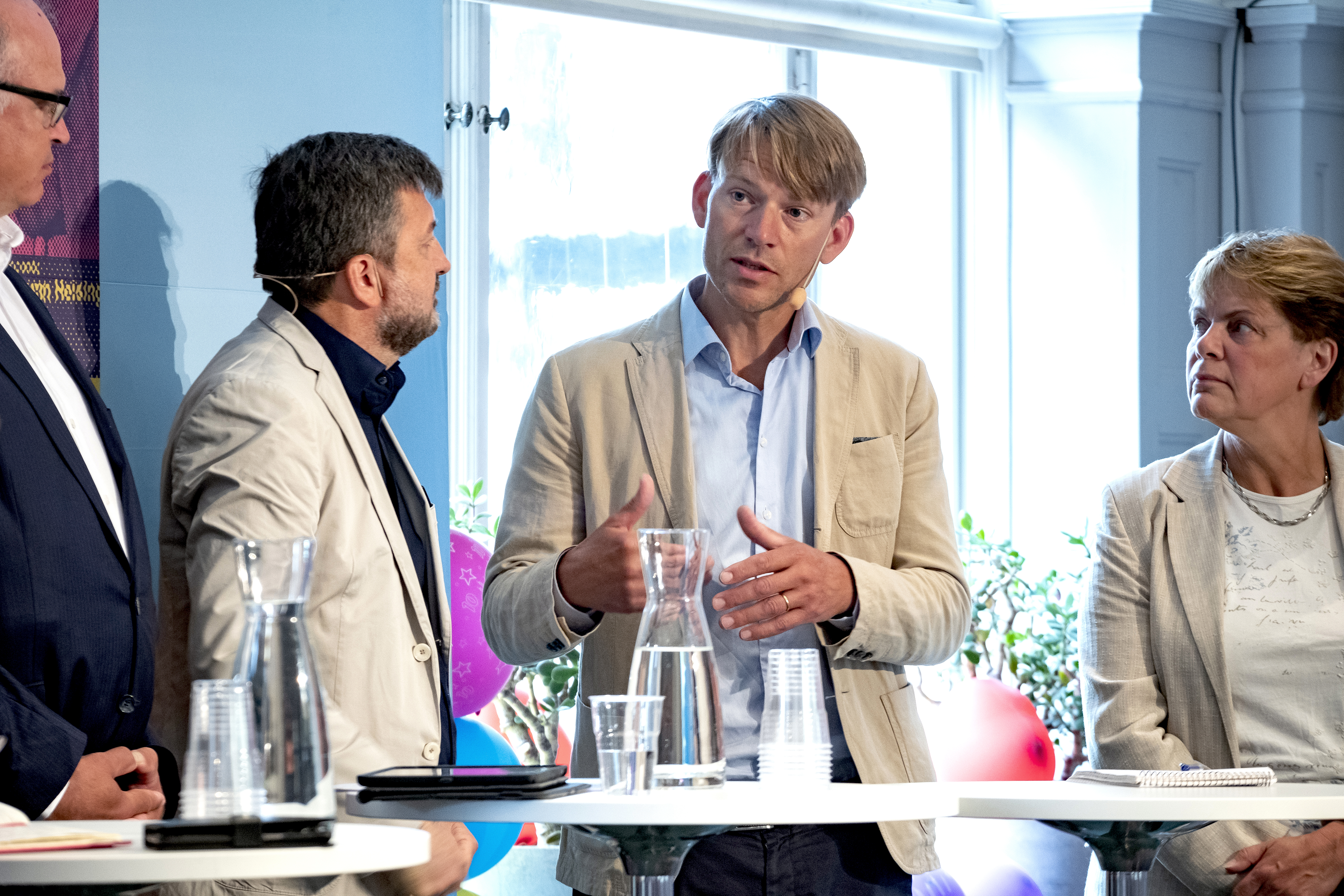
- Helena Gellerman (on right) in 2018

Member of the Swedish Parliament for Västra Götaland County West
- Incumbent
- Assumed office 2018

Personal details
- Born: 29 August 1960 (age 65)
- Party: Liberals
- Profession: Politician

Eva Helena Birgitta Gellerman (born 29 August 1960) is a Swedish politician from the Liberals. She has been a member of the Riksdag since 2018, elected in the Västra Götaland County Western constituency.

== Background ==
Helena Gellerman was born in Örgryte parish in Gothenburg.

She is the daughter of newspaperman Olle Gellerman and member of parliament Kerstin Gellerman. Her maternal grandfather Emil Lagerkvist was a liberal politician in the First Chamber from 1916 to 1919. Gellerman is a civil engineer and has worked in the automotive industry.

== Political career ==
Since September 2018, she has been a member of parliament for the Liberal Party. She has also been a member of the municipal council of Lerum Municipality since 2006. She is one of the Liberal Party's climate policy spokespersons with responsibility for restructuring the transport system.

== See also ==
- List of members of the Riksdag, 2018–2022
- List of members of the Riksdag, 2022–2026
