= National Council of Swedish Children and Youth Organisations =

- Landsrådet för Sveriges Ungdomsorganisationer
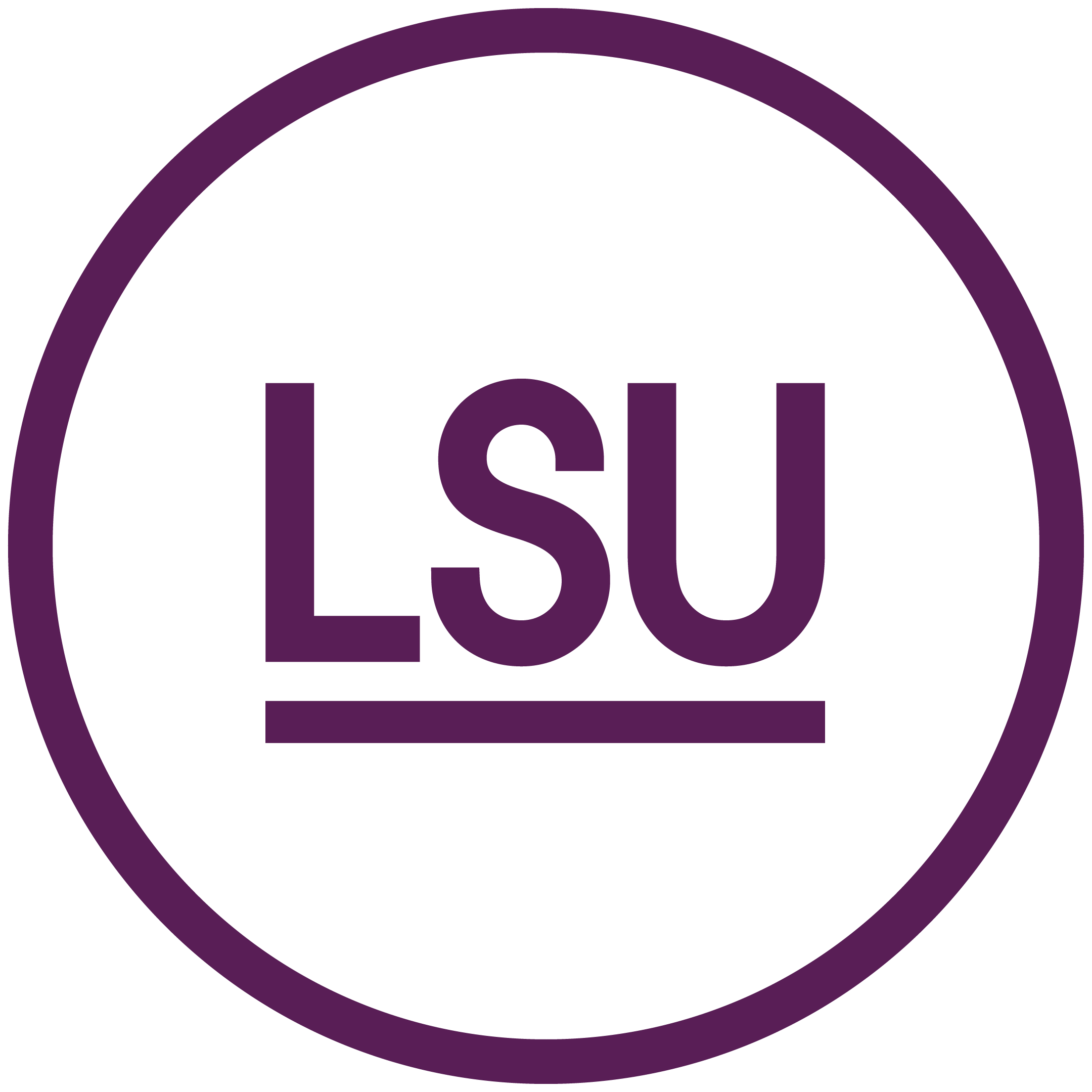
- Formation: 1942
- Founder: Prince Gustaf Adolf, Duke of Västerbotten
- Website: lsu.se

The National Council of Swedish Children and Youth Organisations (Swedish: Landsrådet för Sveriges Ungdomsorganisationer) is a major umbrella organization for Swedish children's and youth organizations. It has 83 member organizations. It was founded as the Sveriges Ungdomsberedskap in 1942 with Prince Gustaf Adolf, Duke of Västerbotten as its first president. It includes organizations such as Scouterna, the Red Cross Youth, organizations for students and pupils and many others.
