= Rebecka Fallenkvist =

Swedish TV presenter and politician

Personal details
- Born: Rebecka Neagu; 2 May 1996 (age 29) Ivetofta, Sweden
- Party: Sweden Democrats
- Occupation: TV presenter, politician

Rebecka Leila Fallenkvist (née Neagu; born 2 May 1996) is a Swedish media personality and politician for the Sweden Democrats.

== Early life and education ==
Fallenkvist grew up in Kristianstad. Her parents were refugees from Romania who immigrated to Sweden in the 1980s. She has a bachelor's degree in international business administration from Linnaeus University.

== Career ==
In 2018, she became active in Young Swedes SDU, the youth wing of the Sweden Democrats, and has since held several positions of trust within the party, including as national ombudswoman and economic policy spokesperson.

Since 2020, she has been recurring presenter of a news program on the YouTube channel of the Sweden Democrats' channel Riks. Since the regional elections in Sweden in 2022, she has been elected as a Sweden Democrat member in the Stockholm Regional Council. In 2022, she started working for Sweden Democrats' financial department.

=== Controversies ===
After the 2022 election night, Fallenkvist received media attention when, in a video published on Swedish blog Samnytt (the successor of Avpixlat), she extended her left arm and said "Helg seger" ("Weekend victory"), something that was seen as a possible allusion to Sieg heil (the Nazi salute "Hail victory", translated as "Hell seger" in Swedish).

On 15 October of the same year, Fallenkvist was removed from her position at Riks by the party leadership, as the day before she had, in a post on Instagram, described her impression of Anne Frank's diary as follows: "50 pages in, and so far Anne Frank has only struck me as depraved. Horniness personified." The statement was criticized by, among others, the Jewish Central Council, the Jewish Youth Federation and Israel's ambassador to Sweden. In a statement to Expressen, Fallenkvist explained that through her comment she "wanted to highlight the good and human nature of Anne - not to minimize the evil she was subjected to".
