= Rasmus Giertz =

Swedish politician (born 1994)

Member of the Riksdag
- In office 26 September 2022 – 12 November 2026
- Preceded by: Sara Gille
- Constituency: Dalarna County

Personal details
- Born: 3 June 1994 (age 32) Enköping, Sweden
- Party: Sweden Democrats

Rasmus Giertz (born 3 June 1994 in Enköping) is a Swedish politician of the Sweden Democrats party who has served as a Member of the Riksdag for the Dalarna County constituency since September 2022.

== Biography ==
Giertz was elected regional leader of the Young Swedes SDU (the youth wing of the SD) in Dalarna in 2018. He later became the regional chairman for the SD in Dalarna in 2022 and stood for the party during the 2022 Swedish general election in the Dalarna County constituency, but was not elected and instead designated as a substitute for Sara Gille. Following the election, Giertz was appointed to the seat after Gille went on maternity leave. He serves as a member of the foreign affairs committee in the Riksdag.

In 2022, Giertz was appointed as a full member of the Riksdag to fill in for Mats Nordberg who died in office.

In 2018, Giertz became the source of some controversy during a public debate when he suggested foreign rapists should be deported while Swedish rapists should "stretch yourself, get a gym card and stop raping women." Giertz later claimed his comments had been taken out of context but were "clumsily worded."

In December 2022, Giertz was reported to the police and initially suspected of assault following an incident outside a pub in Borlänge. Three days later, he filed a counter-report, claiming he had been verbally and physically attacked by a group of men. The case was referred to the Special Prosecutor's Chamber, which handles investigations involving elected officials, judges, and other high-ranking public figures.

In September 2022, Giertz reported that two men had followed and threatened him outside of his home in Falun. A man in his 20s was later charged with harassment against Giertz. In response to the incident, Swedish National Council for Crime Prevention included Giertz's name on a report discussing threats against politicians which found younger elected officials were more likely to be victims of threats.
