= Alexander Wasberg =

Swedish politician (born 1994)

Member of the Riksdag
- In office 26 September 2022 – 17 October 2022
- Succeeded by: Fredrik Olovsson
- Constituency: Södermanland County

Personal details
- Born: 19 July 1994 (age 31)
- Party: Swedish Social Democratic Party

Alexander Wasberg (born 19 July 1994) is a Swedish politician. He was a member of the Riksdag from September to October 2022, as the substitute of Fredrik Olovsson.
