= Josef Fransson =

Swedish politician (born 1978)

Terry Josef Natanael Fransson

Member of the Riksdag
- Incumbent
- Assumed office 2010
- Constituency: Malmö Municipality

Personal details
- Born: 25 September 1978 (age 48) Skaraborg County, Sweden
- Party: Sweden Democrats
- Education: Örebro University

Josef Fransson (born 25 September 1978) is a Swedish politician who has served as an MP in the Riksdag for the Sweden Democrats party since 2010.

Fransson graduated from Örebro University in 2003 with a degree in engineering. In 2010, Fransson was elected to parliament for the Malmö constituency. In the Riksdag, he has served as a member of the committees on Environment and Agriculture and traffic.
