= Sara Gille =

Swedish politician (born 1981)

Member of the Riksdag
- Incumbent
- Assumed office 2018
- Constituency: Malmö Municipality

Personal details
- Born: 8 September 1981 (age 45)
- Party: Sweden Democrats

Medine Sara Borita Gille formerly Seppälä (born 8 September 1981) is a Swedish politician and a member of the Riksdag for Sweden Democrats party.

== Biography ==
Gille was born in Sweden, her mother is Swedish while her father is Turkish (of Kurdish origin), but she was mostly raised in foster care. She graduated with a degree in medicine and worked as a nurse in a hospital and an assisted living facility.

She has been active in politics since 2014. She has described honour violence and forced marriages as issues which inspired her to take an interest in becoming a politician, having relatives who were subjected to both and has called for both practices to be outlawed in Sweden.

During the 2018 Swedish general election, she was elected to the Riksdag for the seat of Malmö Municipality. In parliament, she has served on the Committee on Foreign Affairs and Committee on Education. She was reelected during the 2022 Swedish general election but for the Dalarna county constituency. She took parental leave after her election and was replaced by Rasmus Giertz as a member of parliament.

Outside of politics she lives in Dorotea with her family and cites skiing and riding snowmobiles as her main interests.
