= Henrik Vinge =

Swedish politician (born 1988)

Henrik Vinge SD
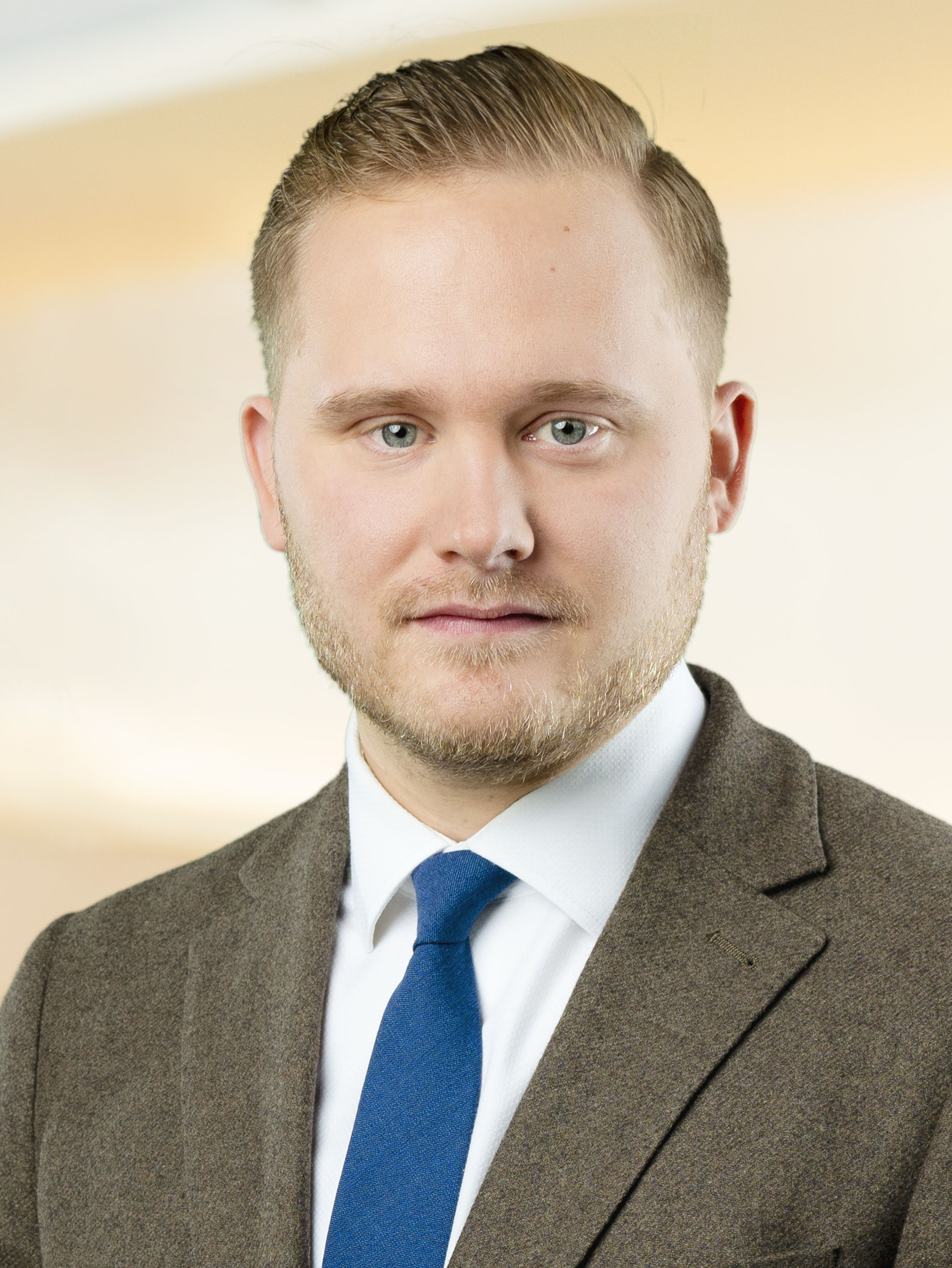
- Henrik Vinge's official portrait Picture: Sveriges riksdag

Leader of the Sweden Democrats in the Riksdag
- In office 25 November 2019 – 26 April 2023
- Leader: Jimmie Åkesson
- Preceded by: Mattias Karlsson
- Succeeded by: Linda Lindberg

Deputy Leader of the Sweden Democrats in the Riksdag
- In office 1 April 2019 – 25 November 2019
- Party Leader: Jimmie Åkesson
- Riksdag Leader: Mattias Karlsson
- Succeeded by: Mattias Bäckström Johansson

Member of the Riksdag
- Incumbent
- Assumed office 24 September 2018
- Constituency: Stockholm Municipality

Personal details
- Born: Henrik Olof Vinge; 10 August 1988 (age 38) Järfälla, Sweden
- Party: Sweden Democrats
- Spouse: Linnéa Vinge
- Education: Stockholm University

Henrik Olof Vinge (born 10 August 1988) is a Swedish lawyer and politician serving as first deputy leader of the Sweden Democrats (SD) since 2019. As a member of the Riksdag (MP) for Stockholm Municipality since 2018, he has served as chairman of the Justice Committee since 2025. He previously served as his party’s parliamentary leader from 2019 to 2023.

== Biography ==
Vinge was born in 1988 in Järfälla. He obtained a law degree from Stockholm University and began training as a lawyer in 2017. During his studies he worked as a volunteer legal advisor for the non-profit online service Lawline. He has also worked as a prison guard at the Swedish Prison and Probation Service and as a recruitment consultant in the education sector. After graduating in 2014, he started a legal firm called Näthatjuristerna, which specializes in investigating criminal violations on the internet.

He became a press manager for the Sweden Democrats in March 2015 and was appointed integration policy spokesperson for the party in August 2018. Vinge has been Member of the Riksdag for Stockholm Municipality since September 2018.

He married 2017 Stockholm Ungsvenskarna politician Linnéa Vinge, formerly Cortés.

Party political offices
| Preceded by Mattias Karlsson | Leader of the Sweden Democrats in the Riksdag; 2019–2023 | Succeeded by Linda Lindberg |
| Preceded by Julia Kronlid | First Deputy Leader of the Sweden Democrats; 2019– | Incumbent |
