= Magdalena Schröder =

Swedish politician (born 1990)

Magdalena Schröder S

Member of the Swedish Parliament for Stockholm
- Incumbent
- Assumed office 9 September 2018

Personal details
- Born: 20 September 1990 (age 35) Stockholm, Stockholm County, Sweden
- Party: Moderate Party
- Profession: Politician

Magdalena Schröder (born 20 September 1990) is a Swedish Moderate Party politician who was a Member of the Riksdag from 2018 until 2022.

== Family ==
She is the granddaughter of the former Member of Parliament Margó Ingvardsson, who sat in the Riksdag for the then Left Party Communists between the years 1983 and 1991.
