= Amalia Rud Pedersen =

Swedish politician (born 1993)

Member of the Riksdag
- Incumbent
- Assumed office 26 September 2022
- Constituency: Gothenburg Municipality

Personal details
- Born: 1993 (age 32–33)
- Party: Social Democrats

Amalia Rud Stenlöf (formerly Pedersen; born 1993) is a Swedish politician. She was elected as Member of the Riksdag in September 2022. She represents the constituency of Gothenburg Municipality. She is affiliated with the Social Democrats.
