= Aylin Fazelian =

Swedish politician (born 1992)

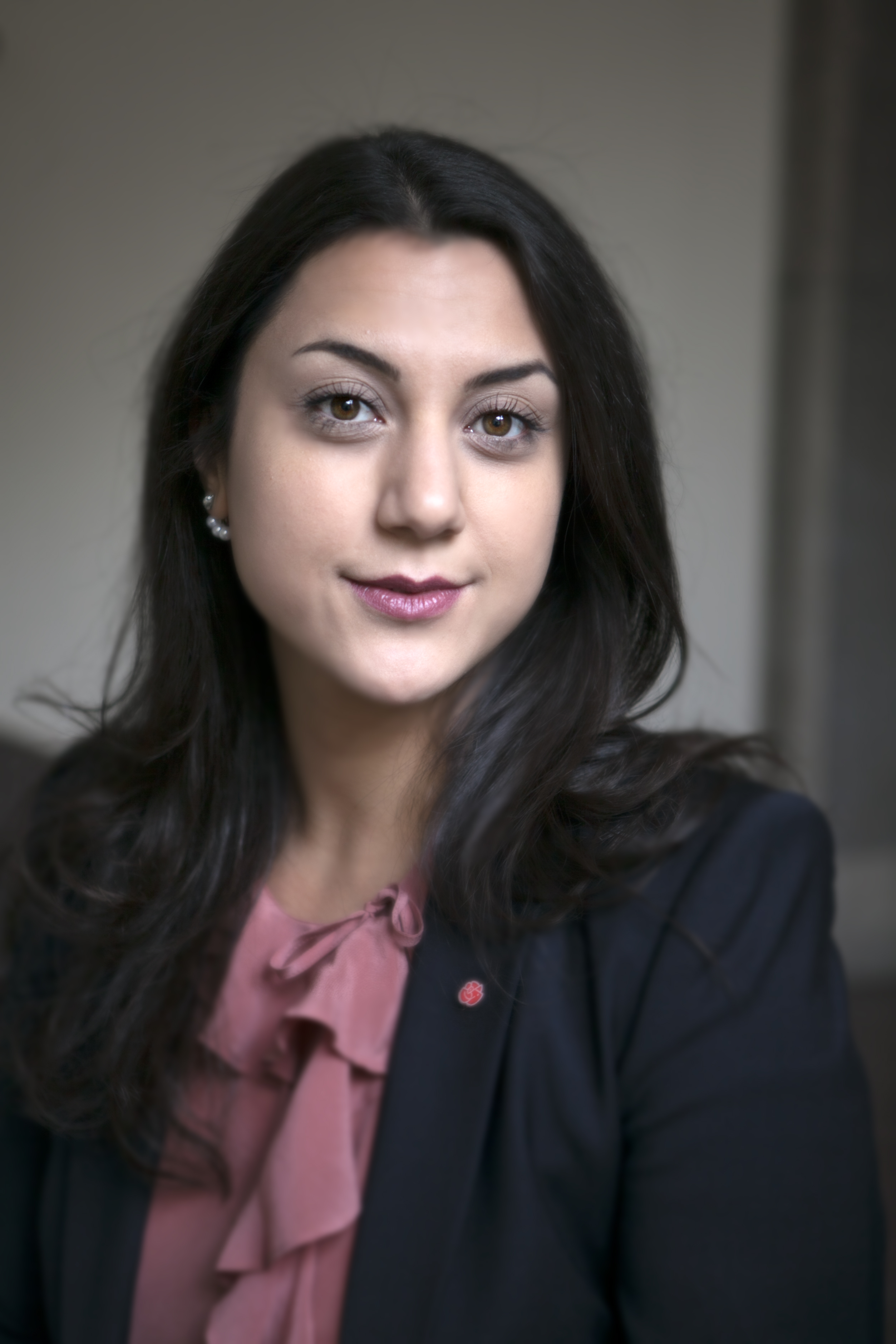

Member of the Riksdag
- Incumbent
- Assumed office 24 September 2018
- Constituency: Västra Götaland County West

Personal details
- Born: 1992 (age 33–34)
- Party: Social Democrats

Aylin Fazelian (born 1992) is an Azerbaijani-Swedish politician. Since September 2018, she serves as Member of the Riksdag representing the constituency of Västra Götaland County West.

She was also elected as Member of the Riksdag in September 2022.

== Personal life ==
Fazelian was born to Azerbaijani parents from Azerbaijan.
