= Margareta Cederfelt =

Swedish politician (born 1959)

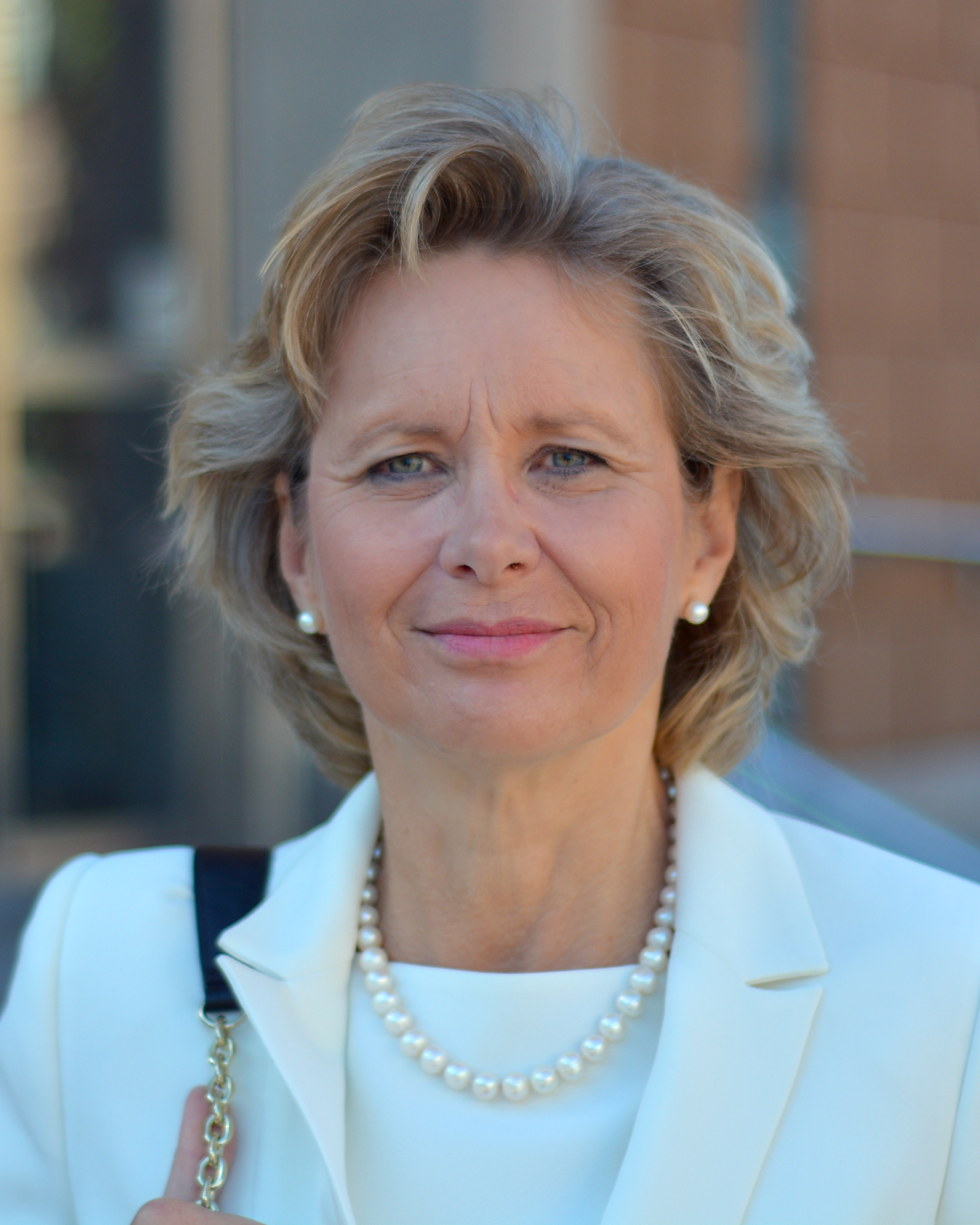

Member of the Riksdag
- In office 1999–2002, 2006–

Member of the Committee on Transport and Communications
- In office 2006–2008

Member of the Committee on the Constitution
- In office 2008–2010

Member of the Committee on Civil Affairs
- In office 2010–2014

Member of the Committee on Foreign Affairs
- In office 2014–

Personal details
- Born: 19 December 1959 (age 66)
- Party: Moderate Party

Margareta Cederfelt (born in 1959 in Limhamn, Sweden) is a Swedish politician of the Moderate Party. She was a member of the Riksdag from 2000 to 2002, and a replacement member of the Riksdag from 1999 to 2000. Since 2006, she has again been a replacement member. In that role, Cederfelt has been substituting since May 2008 for Fredrik Reinfeldt, who served as Prime Minister of Sweden from 2006 to 2014.
