= Linus Lakso =

Swedish politician (born 1983)

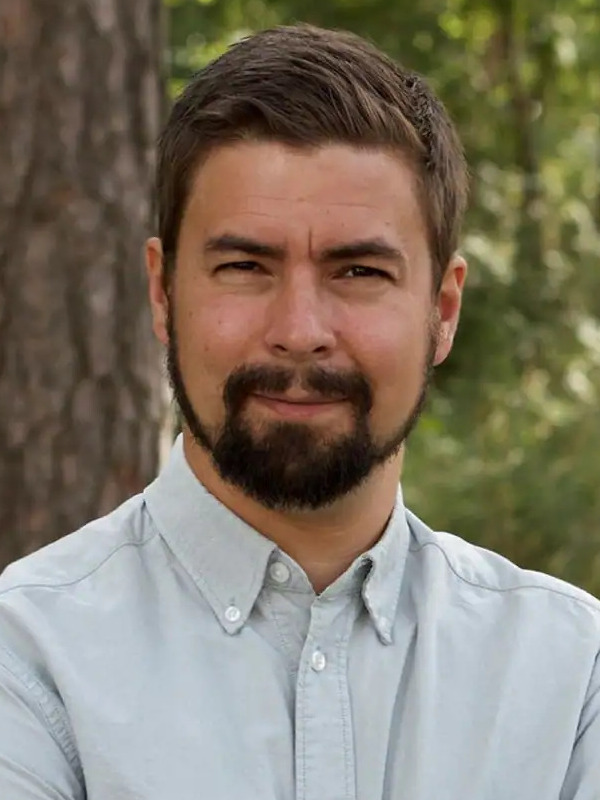

Member of the Riksdag
- Incumbent
- Assumed office 26 September 2022
- Constituency: Södermanland County

Personal details
- Born: 1983 (age 42–43)
- Party: Green Party

Linus Lakso (born 1983) is a Swedish politician. He was elected as Member of the Riksdag in September 2022. He represents the constituency of Södermanland County. He is affiliated with the Green Party.
