= Daniel Bäckström (politician) =

Swedish politician (born 1975)

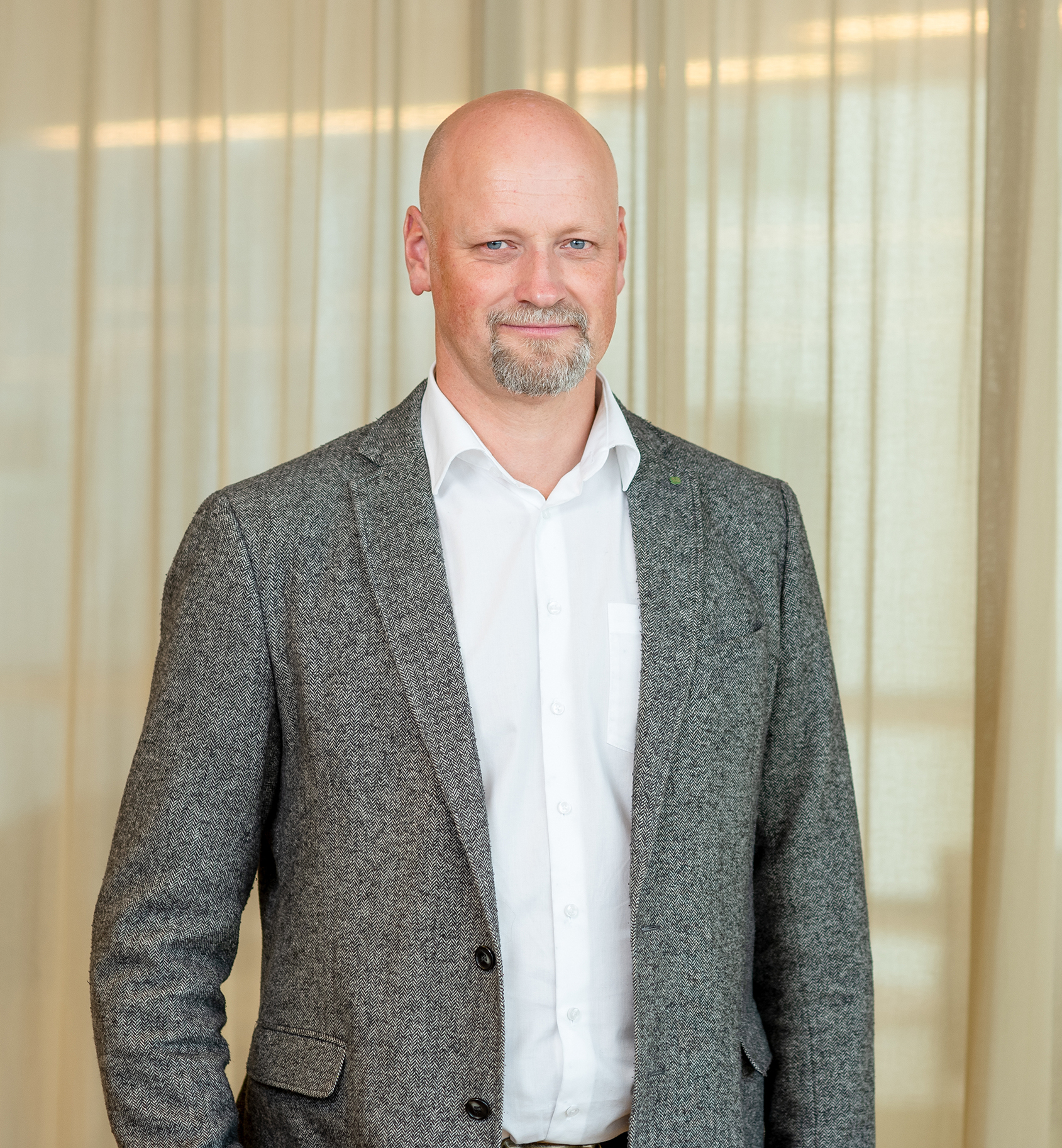
- Daniel Bäckström in September 2019

Member of the Riksdag
- Incumbent
- Assumed office 29 September 2014
- Constituency: Värmland County

Personal details
- Born: 18 November 1975 (age 50)
- Party: Centre

Daniel Bäckström (born 18 November 1975) is a Swedish politician. Since September 2014, he serves as Member of the Riksdag representing the constituency of Värmland County for the Centre Party.

He was also elected as Member of the Riksdag in September 2018 and September 2022.

Party political offices
| Preceded by Linda Modig | First Deputy Leader of the Centre Party; 2023–2025 | Succeeded by Rickard Nordin |
