= 2026 Swedish general election =

- 13 September 2026

All 349 seats to the Riksdag 175 seats needed for a majority
- Opinion polls
- Registered: 8,051,355 ▲3.5%
- Turnout: 6,834,413 (84.9% ▲0.7pp)
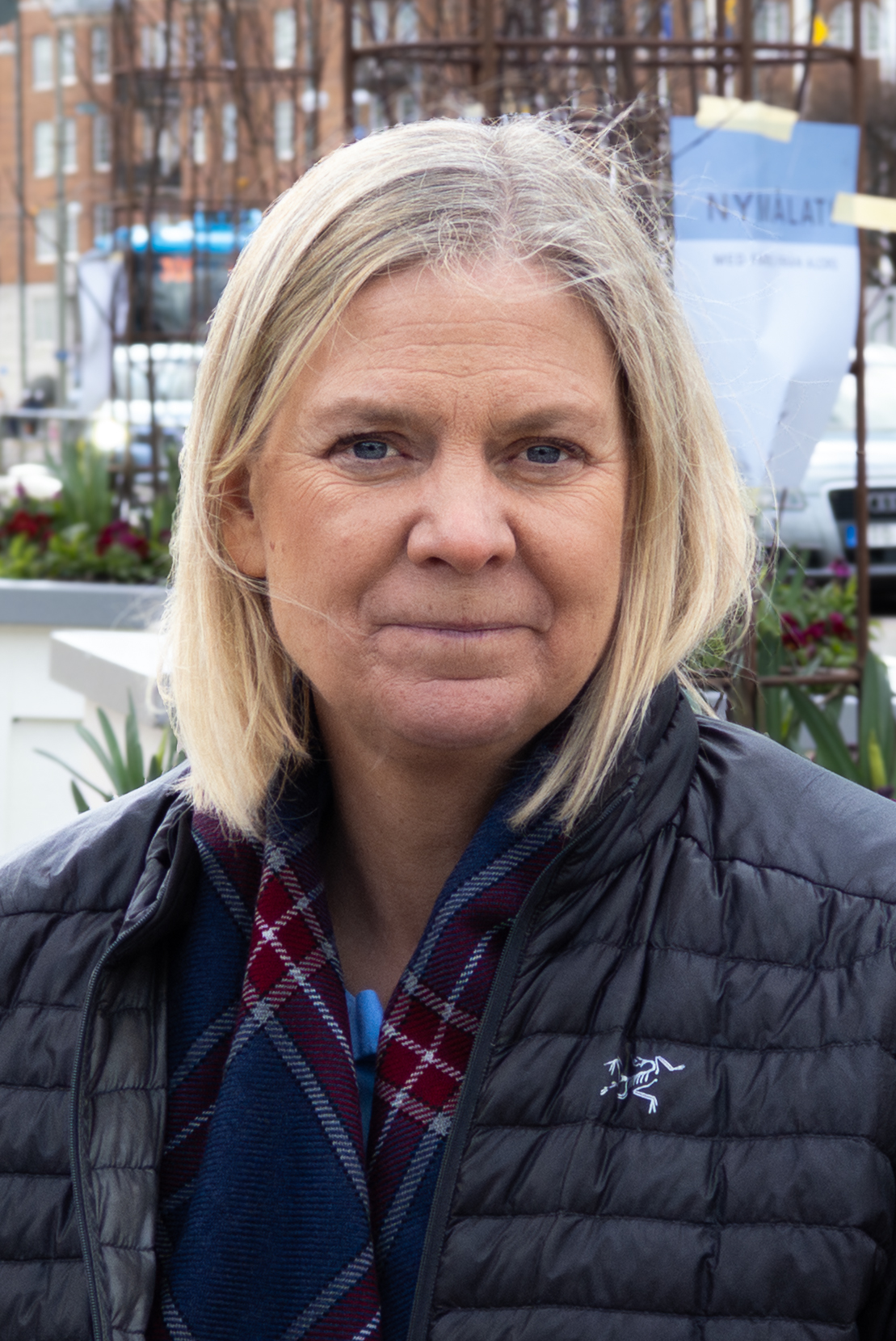

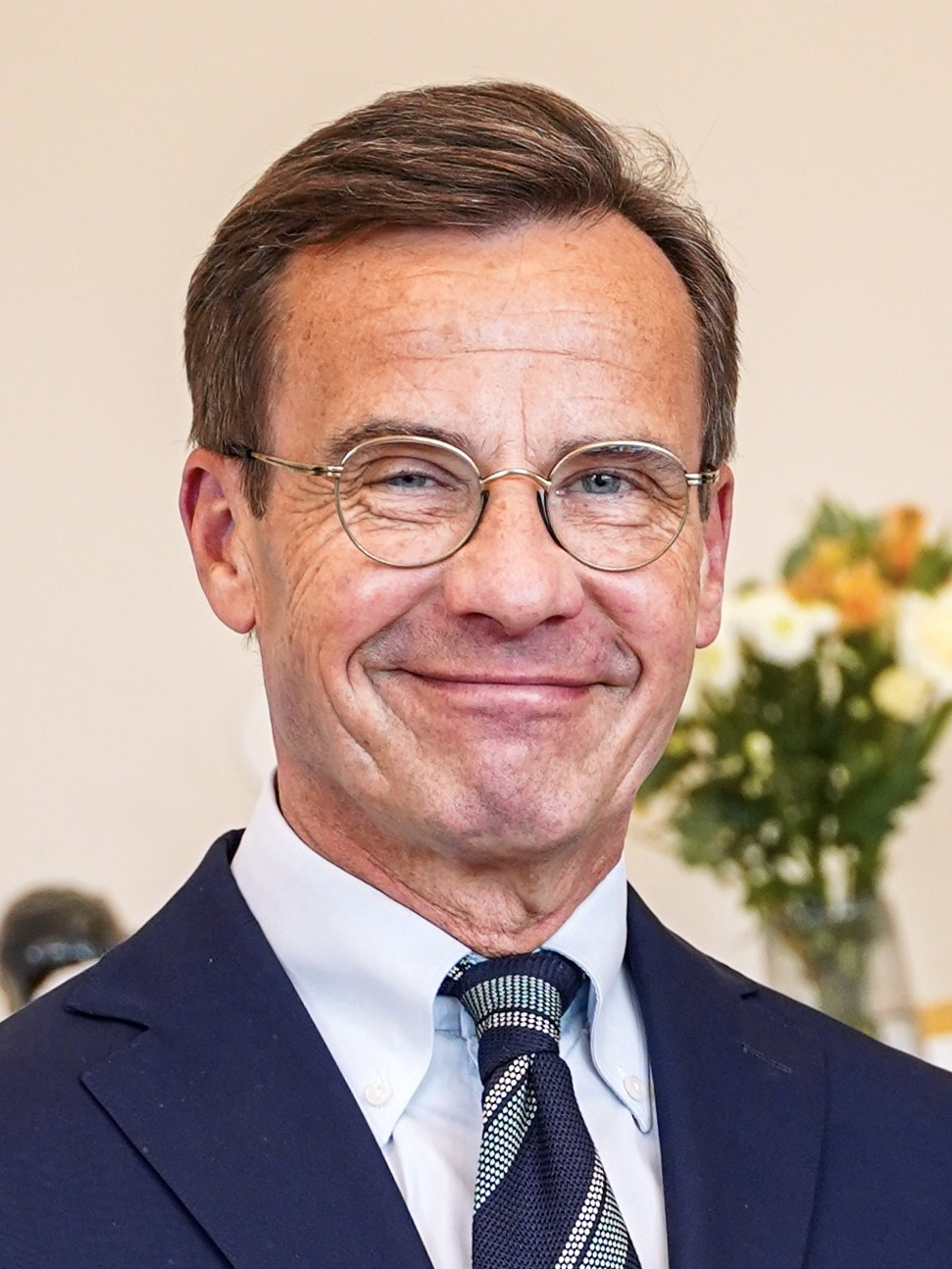

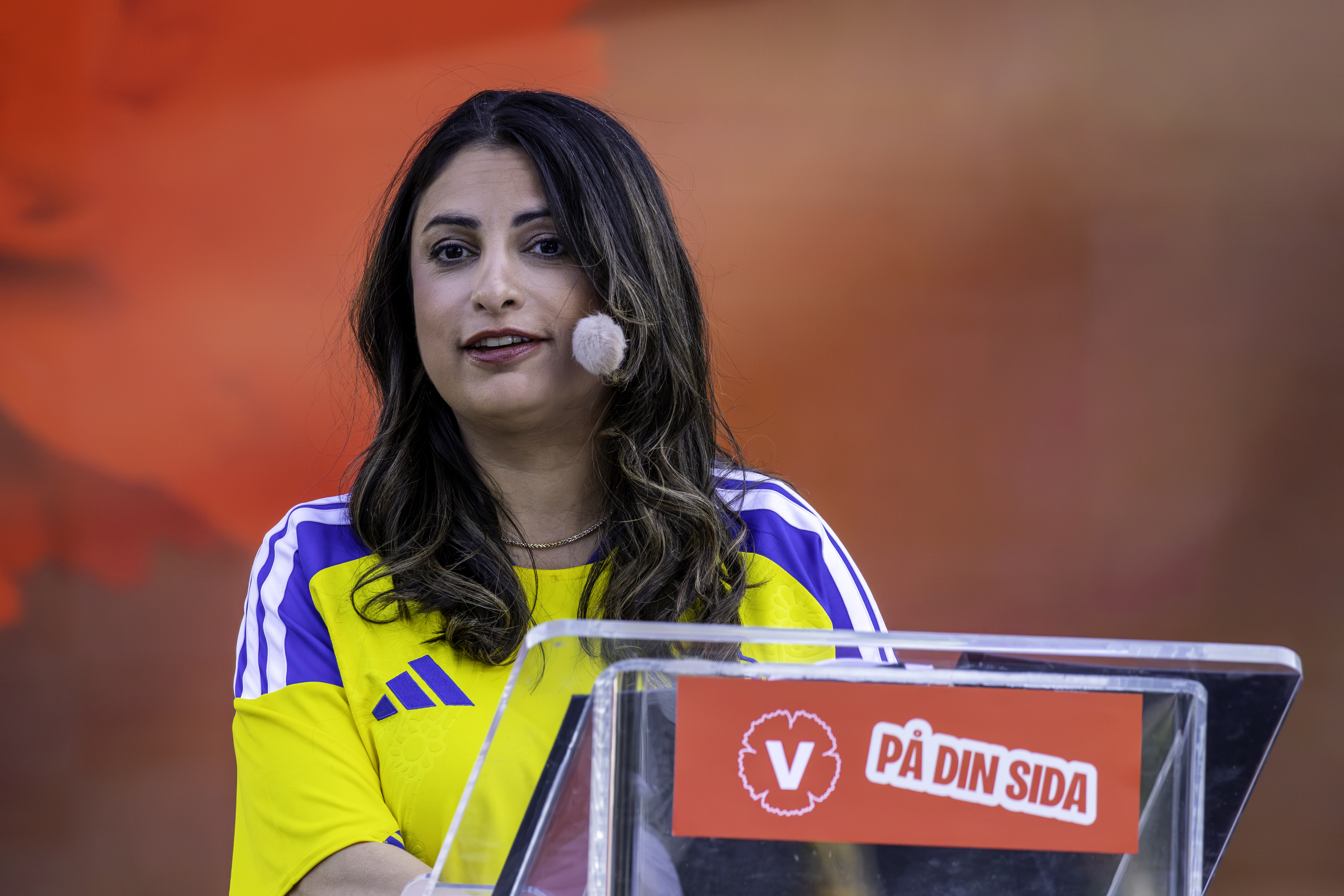

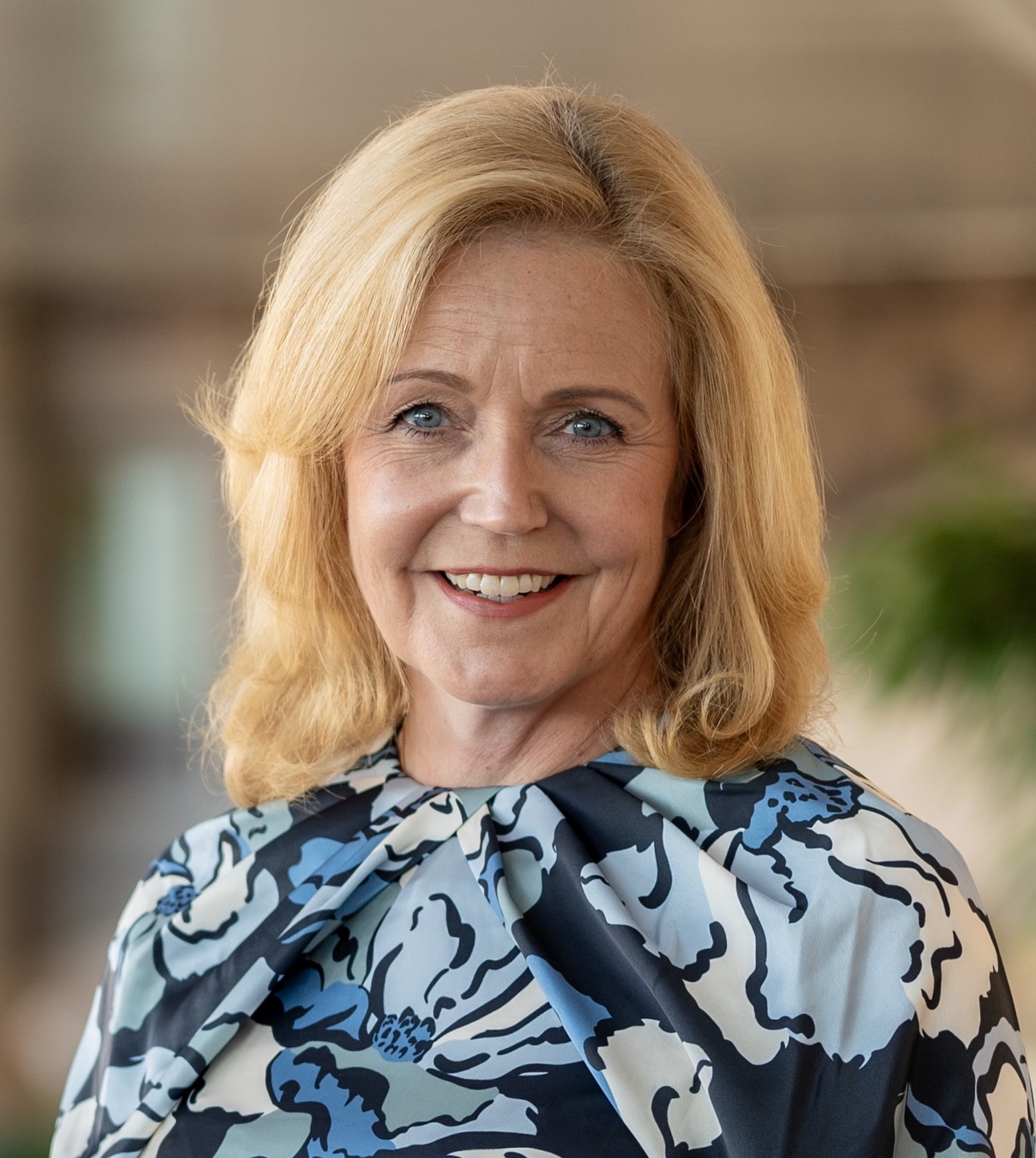

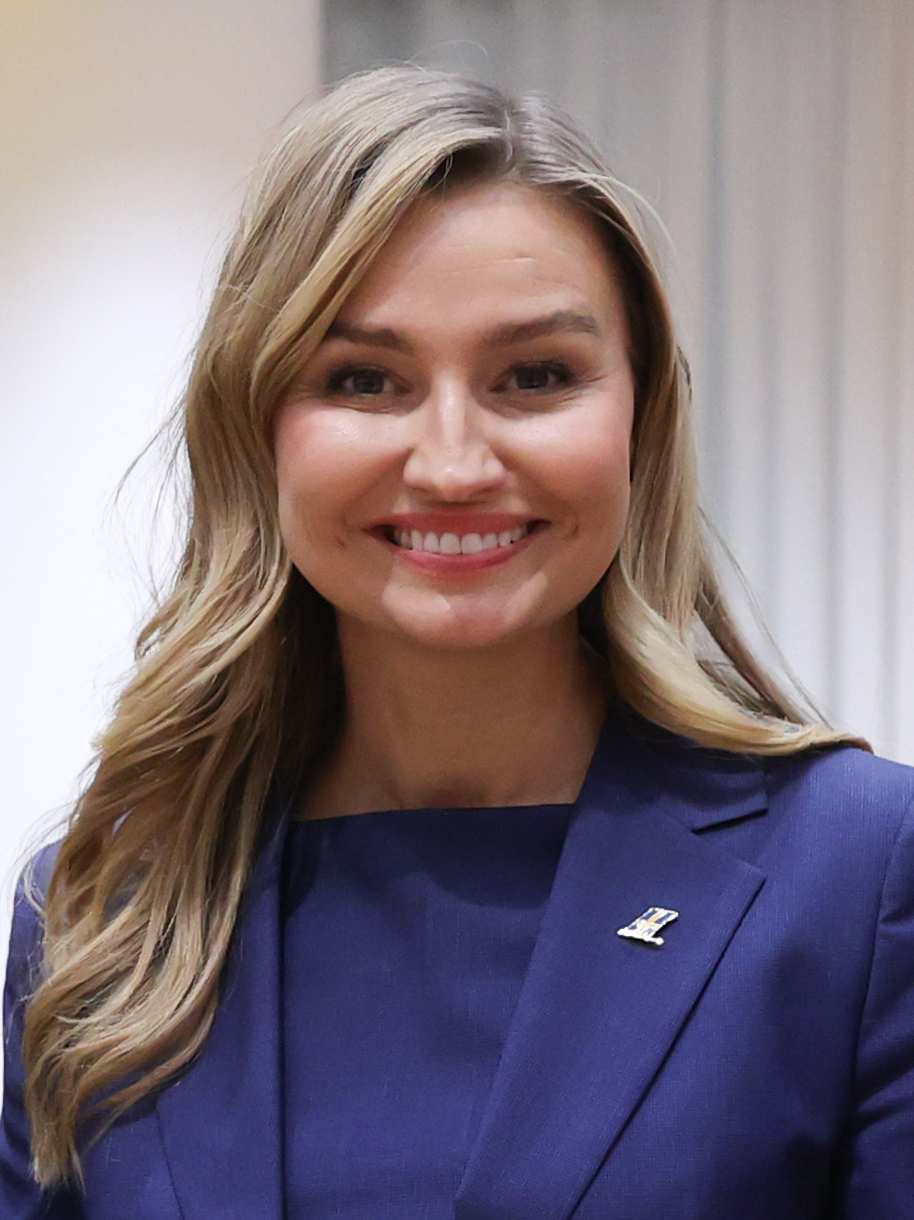

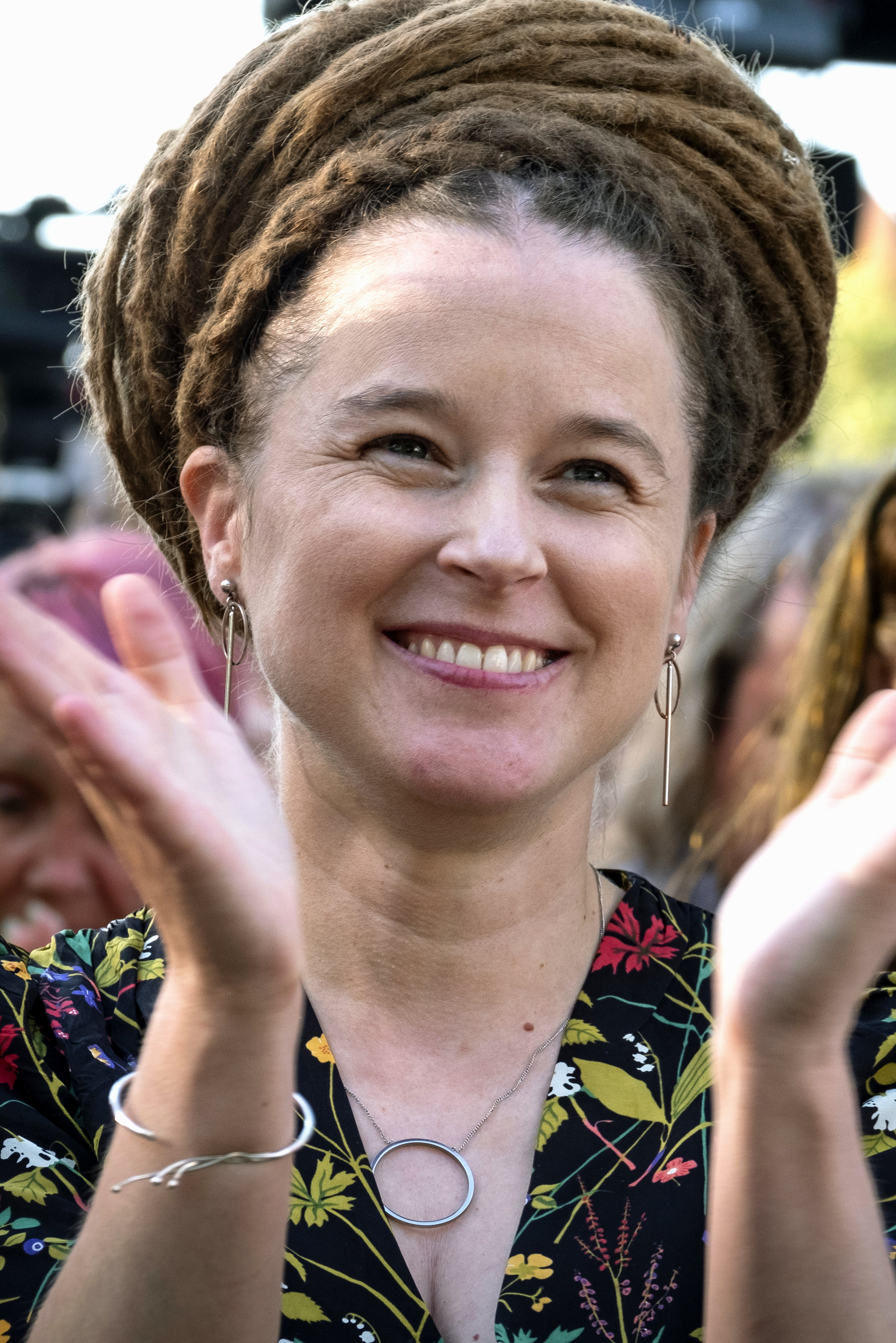

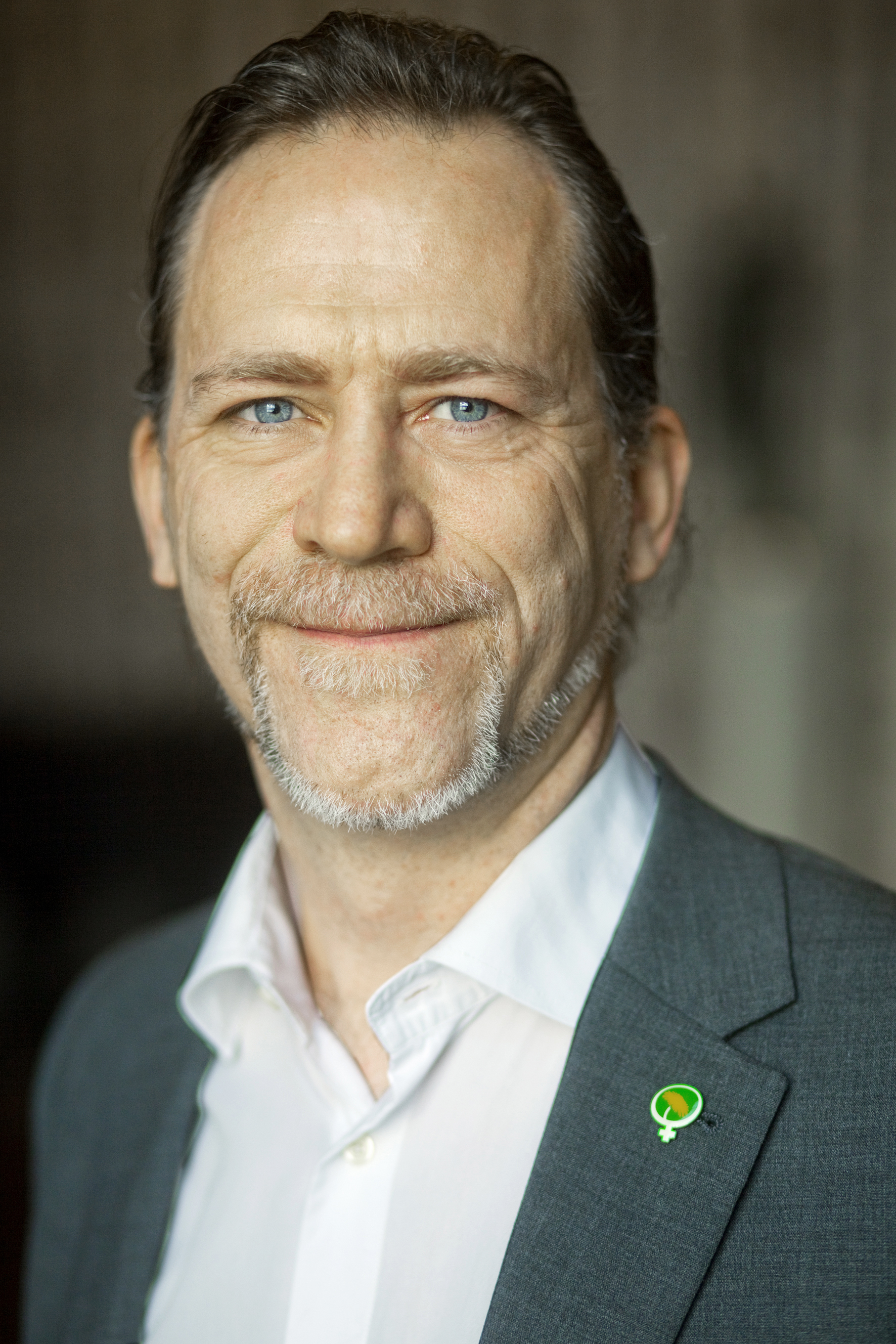

	First party	Second party	Third party
Leader	Magdalena Andersson	Ulf Kristersson	Jimmie Åkesson
Party	Social Democrats	Moderate	Sweden Democrats
Alliance		Tidö	Tidö
Leader's seat	Stockholm County	Södermanland County	Jönköping County
Last election	107 seats, 30.3%	68 seats, 19.1%	73 seats, 20.5%
Seats before	106	66	70
Seats won	99	70	62
Seat change	▼8	▲2	▼11
Popular vote	1,895,989	1,343,438	1,183,248
Percentage	28.02%	19.85%	17.48%
Swing	▼2.31 pp	▲0.75 pp	▼3.05 pp
	Fourth party	Fifth party	Sixth party
Leader	Nooshi Dadgostar	Elisabeth Thand Ringqvist	Ebba Busch
Party	Left	Centre	Christian Democrats
Alliance			Tidö
Leader's seat	Stockholm County	Stockholm Municipality	Västra Götaland County East
Last election	24 seats, 6.8%	24 seats, 6.7%	19 seats, 5.3%
Seats before	21	24	19
Seats won	30	25	22
Seat change	▲6	▲1	▲3
Popular vote	568,781	475,780	417,790
Percentage	8.40%	7.03%	6.17%
Swing	▲1.66 pp	▲0.32 pp	▲0.83 pp
	Seventh party	Eighth party
Leader	Amanda Lind; Daniel Helldén	Simona Mohamsson
Party	Green	Liberals
Alliance		Tidö
Leader's seat	Stockholm County; Stockholm Municipality	Västra Götaland County North
Last election	18 seats, 5.1%	16 seats, 4.6%
Seats before	18	16
Seats won	22	19
Seat change	▲4	▲3
Popular vote	414,307	361,187
Percentage	6.12%	5.34%
Swing	▲1.04 pp	▲0.73 pp
- Distribution of constituency and levelling seats and largest political bloc by constituency
Prime Minister before election
Ulf Kristersson
Moderate
Prime Minister after election
TBD

General elections were held in Sweden on 13 September 2026 to elect the 349 members of the Riksdag, alongside municipal and regional elections. The incumbent Ulf Kristersson cabinet was a coalition minority between the Moderate Party (M), the Christian Democrats (KD), and the Liberals (L), with external support from the Sweden Democrats (SD) under the Tidö Agreement. It was the first general election since Sweden joined NATO in 2024 and resulted in the left-leaning opposition winning a narrow parliamentary majority.

The main parties contested the election within two broad political blocs. The governing Tidö parties consisted of M, KD, L, and SD, while the opposition was led by the Social Democrats (S) under Magdalena Andersson, together with the Left Party (V), Centre Party (C), and Green Party (MP). The campaign focused heavily on immigration and integration, crime and law and order, the economy, healthcare, education, climate change, and energy policy. SD sought a formal role in government after supporting the Tidö government from outside the cabinet during the previous parliamentary term, making its potential entry into government one of the central issues of the campaign.

Opinion polls gave the red-green opposition a clear advantage throughout the campaign. As the election came closer, the opposition's lead narrowed in the opinion polls and the difference between the two blocs started to even out. However, the opposition still generally held an advantage in the final weeks, with several polls placing the four opposition parties above 50% of the vote. Exit polls initially indicated a wider opposition victory than the final result, with the first projections giving the opposition a clearer parliamentary advantage. The election nevertheless remained close until the final votes were counted, with the outcome ultimately determined by a small difference in support between the two blocs. The opposition primarily gained ground in the bigger cities and won unprecedented landslides in the four largest cities. The opposition also reduced deficits in much of the south and the outer county surrounding Stockholm, whereas the Tidö coalition made big gains in central and northern Sweden. This notably resulted in the Tidö coalition winning historically socialist counties Gävleborg and Värmland against the national trend. Many municipalities in former socialist strongholds likewise voted for the right for the first time in a national election, resulting in a very polarised map.

The opposition parties won a narrow parliamentary majority, securing 176 of the Riksdag's 349 seats, compared with 173 for the Tidö parties. Social Democrats remained the largest party with 28.0% of the vote and 99 seats, while Moderates overtook Sweden Democrats to become the second-largest party with 19.9% and 70 seats, as Sweden Democrats fell to third place with 17.5% and 62 seats. The result marked the first decline in support for Sweden Democrats at a general election and Social Democrats recorded their lowest vote and seat share since 1911. Following the result, Kristersson announced his resignation as prime minister and Andersson began negotiations with the opposition parties over the formation of a new government.

== Background ==
After the 2022 Swedish general election, a right-wing bloc consisting of the Moderates (M), Christian Democrats (KD), Liberals (L), and Sweden Democrats (SD) secured a narrow majority of seats in the Riksdag. One month of negotiations between them followed, leading to the Tidö Agreement that allowed the M party leader Ulf Kristersson to become prime minister and lead the Kristersson cabinet. It was a minority government of M, KD, and L with confidence and supply from SD. During the following term, the four parties became known as the Tidö parties.

The 2026 general election was the first parliamentary election in Sweden since the country acceded to NATO on 7 March 2024, which ended Swedish neutrality after more than 200 years of military non-alignment. Sweden applied for NATO membership together with Finland in 2022, following the February 2022 Russian invasion of Ukraine.

== Electoral system ==
The Riksdag is made up of 349 seats elected by open lists and proportional representation, with an electoral threshold of 4% of the national vote or alternatively 12% within a single constituency. Of the 349 seats, 310 are elected from 29 constituencies ranging in size from 2 to 41 seats, while the other 39 seats are apportioned nationally as levelling seats to ensure parties that passed the 4% national threshold hold a proportional number of seats; these levelling seats are allocated to particular districts. If a party wins more constituency seats than it is entitled to overall, a redistribution of constituency seats may occur to reduce the number of constituency seats won by that party.

General elections are held on a fixed date, the second Sunday of September, at the same time as the municipal and regional elections. If early elections are called, the newly elected legislature only serves out the remainder of the four-year term begun by the previous legislature. Polls opened for Swedish citizens who resided abroad on 30 July 2026.

== Political parties ==
The table below lists political parties represented in the Riksdag after the 2022 general election.

Abbr.	Name	Ideology	Political position	Leader	2022 result		Pre-election
Abbr.	Name	Ideology	Political position	Leader	Votes (%)	Seats	
S	Swedish Social Democratic Party; Socialdemokraterna	Social democracy	Centre-left	Magdalena Andersson	30.3%	107 / 349	106 / 349
SD	Sweden Democrats; Sverigedemokraterna	Right-wing populism	Right-wing to far-right	Jimmie Åkesson	20.5%	73 / 349	72 / 349
M	Moderate Party; Moderaterna	Liberal conservatism	Centre-right	Ulf Kristersson	19.1%	68 / 349	66 / 349
V	Left Party; Vänsterpartiet	Socialism	Left-wing	Nooshi Dadgostar	6.8%	24 / 349	21 / 349
C	Centre Party; Centerpartiet	Liberalism; Nordic agrarianism	Centre to centre-right	Elisabeth Thand Ringqvist	6.7%	24 / 349	24 / 349
KD	Christian Democrats; Kristdemokraterna	Christian democracy	Right-wing	Ebba Busch	5.3%	19 / 349	19 / 349
MP	Green Party; Miljöpartiet	Green politics	Centre-left	Amanda Lind Daniel Helldén	5.1%	18 / 349	18 / 349
L	Liberals; Liberalerna	Conservative liberalism	Centre-right	Simona Mohamsson	4.6%	16 / 349	16 / 349
—N/a	Independents	—N/a					7 / 349

=== Independents ===
Going into the 2026 election, a record nine members of parliament resigned from the parties on which they were elected while remaining in parliament – they are commonly referred to as politiska vildar (lit. 'political savages'). Although elections take place on a by-party-basis, such members cannot be forced to resign from the Riksdag, as the mandates won in elections are personal.

Member	Party		Ref.
Member	From	To	Ref.
Jamal El-Haj	Social Democrats	Unity Party	
Arin Karapet	Moderate Party	Sweden Democrats	
Marléne Lund Kopparklint	Moderate Party	Sweden Democrats	
Elsa Widding	Sweden Democrats	Ambition Sweden	
Katja Nyberg	Sweden Democrats	Ambition Sweden	
Sara-Lena Bjälkö	Sweden Democrats	Christian Democrats	
Lorena Delgado Varas	Left Party	Future Left	
Daniel Riazat	Left Party	Future Left	
Momodou Malcolm Jallow	Left Party	Future Left	

== Campaign ==
A ballot for the Riksdag election, enclosed in an envelope, being dropped into a sealed ballot box by a voting official at Stångenässkolan, Brastad, Sweden.

According to an August 2026 Novus poll, voters considered the ten most important political areas—ranked from most to least important—to be healthcare, education, law and order, immigration/integration, elderly care, the economy, employment, the climate, taxes, and energy policy. Following the Fagersta school attack on 21 August 2026, several party leaders cancelled planned speeches ahead of the election. On the morning after the attack, more than 70 people, including party leaders Ulf Kristersson, Magdalena Andersson, Simona Mohamsson, and Elisabeth Thand Ringqvist gathered at a memorial site for the victims of the attack carrying flowers and lighting candles.

=== Potential governments ===
The 2010s and 2020s have seen an increased difficulty for Swedish parties to reach agreements on government formation, keeping with a broader European trend of increased political fragmentation.

==== Tidö Agreement ====
During the 2022–2026 Riksdag term, the government has been formed by the Moderates (M), Christian Democrats (KD), and Liberals (L), with the support and co-operation of the Sweden Democrats (SD), outside of the government but intimately involved in policy decisions, as regulated by the Tidö Agreement. This group is referred to as the "Tidö parties" or the "blue-yellow" alliance. In 2025, the Tidö parties announced their intention to continue their cooperation after the 2026 election. How they were going to cooperate was unclear, as SD said they would vote against any government which did not grant them cabinet positions, while L said they would continue to block SD from receiving cabinet positions.

On 13 March 2026, L and SD announced an agreement ("The Sweden Promise"), which would give SD cabinet positions if the Tidö coalition received a majority of seats. The pre-election agreement also included policy goals they would cooperate on, including a national referendum on adopting the euro as currency, coinciding with the 2030 general election. For most of the period 2022–2026, support for L had been below the Riksdag's 4% electoral threshold according to opinion polls. This was a concern for the Tidö parties' ability to maintain power and caused some in-fighting, with for example SD's Jimmie Åkesson telling Tidö supporters not to consider lending their vote to L unless they reach at least 3.5% in polls by 3 September.

==== Opposition ====
The opposition to a renewed Tidö coalition government consisted as of September 2026 of the left-leaning red-green bloc, consisting of the Social Democrats (S), Greens (MP) and Left Party (V), alongside the liberal and economically right-wing Center Party (C). The Center Party were in a coalition with the Moderates, Christian Democrats and Liberals from 2004 up until the 2019 January Agreement, but unlike their former allies were not a part of the Tidö Agreement following the 2022 election, opposing entering into any coalition with the Sweden Democrats and any government reliant on their support. During the campaigning for the election, the Center Party, although maintaining that their ideal government would be themselves, M, KD and L, reaffirmed their total opposition to working with SD; however, they also campaigned on a promise to oppose any government that included the Left Party. The Left Party, meanwhile, campaigned on a promise to refuse to act as a support party for a government led by the Social Democrats, as the party has for much of its history, stating that they would oppose any government that they were not a part of. During the campaign, the contradictory positions of C and V raised questions over the feasibility of a left-wing government, with opinion polling showing that all four parties would very likely be needed for the opposition to command a majority.

==== Centrist government ====
A third possible government that has received media attention following the 2026 election is a centrist government containing S, MP, C, and KD. This is a preferred option for C, but MP are skeptical of the idea. Despite some prior "flirting" between Andersson (S) and Busch (KD), which had drawn criticism from Åkesson (SD), Busch said on 2 September that KD would vote against Andersson even if it would trigger a new election.

=== Returning politicians ===
Former minister and contender for the leadership of the Liberals Birgitta Ohlsson announced on 18 March 2026 that she would be a parliamentary candidate for the Centre party. On 20 March, former Liberal leader (1997–2007) Lars Leijonborg announced his return to politics as a parliamentary candidate for the Liberals. Approximately a quarter of members of the Riksdag did not seek reelection, including half of the Liberal representatives.

=== Debates ===
2026 Swedish general election debates
Date	Time (CEST)	Organizers	Moderator	P Present I Invitee N Non-invitee								Ref.
Date	Time (CEST)	Organizers	Moderator	S	M	SD	C	V	KD	L	MP	Ref.
17 Aug	20:00–22:00	Expressen; Dagens industri	Ylva Johansson; Viktor Barth-Kron	P Magdalena Andersson	P Ulf Kristersson	P Jimmie Åkesson	P Elisabeth Thand Ringqvist	P Nooshi Dadgostar	P Ebba Busch	P Simona Mohamsson	P Amanda Lind	
4 Sep	16:00–17:45	SR	Johar Bendjelloul Mikael Sjödell	P Magdalena Andersson	P Ulf Kristersson	P Jimmie Åkesson	P Elisabeth Thand Ringqvist	P Nooshi Dadgostar	P Ebba Busch	P Simona Mohamsson	P Daniel Helldén	
9 Sep	20:00–21:30	SVT	Elisabeth Marmorstein; Fouad Youcefi	P Magdalena Andersson	P Ulf Kristersson	N	N	N	N	N	N	
10 Sep	20:00–22:00	TV4	Ann Tiberg; Jenny Strömstedt	P Magdalena Andersson	P Ulf Kristersson	P Jimmie Åkesson	P Elisabeth Thand Ringqvist	P Nooshi Dadgostar	P Ebba Busch	P Simona Mohamsson	P Amanda Lind	
11 Sep	20:00–22:00	SVT	Elisabeth Marmorstein; Fouad Youcefi	P Magdalena Andersson	P Ulf Kristersson	P Jimmie Åkesson	P Elisabeth Thand Ringqvist	P Nooshi Dadgostar	P Ebba Busch	P Simona Mohamsson	P Amanda Lind	
12 Sep	20:00–22:00	TV4	Anders Pihlblad; Ann Tiberg	P Magdalena Andersson	P Ulf Kristersson	N	N	N	N	N	N	

== Opinion polls ==
=== Graphical summary ===
S SD M V C KD MP L

== Results ==

Graphical summary of the election results

In the preliminary result, only the votes of the eight parties that are represented in the Riksdag are reported separately. The votes cast for all other parties are reported collectively. The preliminary count on election night indicated that the opposition left-leaning parties were leading by three seats against the right-leaning government parties and the Sweden Democrats.

With 80% of the votes counted, the opposition parties led by the Social Democrats and Andersson held 175 seats against 174 for the governing Tidö parties led by Prime Minister Kristersson. As counting continued, the opposition's lead increased to three seats, with 176 seats against 173 for the Tidö parties, although around 30,000 votes separated the blocs and a substantial number of advance votes remained to be counted. The final result was therefore not yet clear, with the remaining postal and late advance votes potentially affecting the distribution of seats.

The result remained subject to formal certification by the Swedish Election Authority, but the last votes cast from abroad and late-arriving early votes confirmed the opposition victory, and the completion of the count also confirmed the three-seat difference between the two blocs. By 17 September, the vote count had been completed, with the opposition parties (49.6%) securing 176 of the Riksdag's 349 seats and the Tidö parties (48.8%) the remaining 173 seats.

Party	Votes	%	Seats	+/–
By party
Social Democrats	1,895,989	28.02	99	–8
Moderate Party	1,343,448	19.85	70	+2
Sweden Democrats	1,183,248	17.48	62	–11
Left Party	568,781	8.40	30	+6
Centre Party	475,780	7.03	25	+1
Christian Democrats	417,490	6.17	22	+3
Green Party	414,307	6.12	22	+4
Liberals	361,187	5.34	19	+3
Örebro Party	39,644	0.59	0	New
Alternative for Sweden	26,729	0.39	0	0
Christian Values Party	9,017	0.13	0	0
Ambition Sweden	7,679	0.11	0	New
Pirate Party	7,464	0.11	0	0
Citizens' Coalition	4,118	0.06	0	0
Human Rights and Democracy	3,556	0.05	0	0
Communist Party of Sweden	2,167	0.03	0	0
Enad Röst	1,286	0.02	0	0
Nuance Party	1,069	0.02	0	0
Other parties (fewer than 1,000 votes)	4,470	0.07	–	–
Total	6,767,429	100.00	349	0
Valid votes	6,767,429	99.02		
Invalid votes	7,427	0.11		
Blank votes	59,557	0.87		
Total votes	6,834,413	100.00		
Registered voters/turnout	8,051,355	84.89		
Source: Election Authority
Graph of the party split among 349 seats.
By bloc
Andersson's Bloc (S+MP+V+C)	3,354,857	49.57	176	+3
Kristersson's Bloc (M+SD+KD+L)	3,305,373	48.84	173	–3
Others	107,199	1.58	0	0
Total	6,767,429	100.00	349	0
Valid votes	6,767,429	99.02		
Invalid votes	7,427	0.11		
Blank votes	59,557	0.87		
Total votes	6,834,413	100.00		
Registered voters/turnout	8,051,355	84.89		
Source: Election Authority

=== Results by constituency ===
Constituency	Turnout	Valid votes	S	M	SD	V	C	KD	MP	L	Other	Opp.	Tidö
Constituency	Turnout	Valid votes	%	%	%	%	%	%	%	%	%	%	%
Stockholm Municipality	85.6	654,686	26.3	19.1	8.3	13.0	9.8	3.9	11.2	7.1	1.2	60.3	38.5
Stockholm County	83.5	890,992	25.8	23.8	14.9	8.1	7.8	5.7	5.7	6.6	1.5	47.5	51.1
Uppsala	86.4	267,397	27.1	18.4	15.6	9.7	7.7	6.6	8.4	5.0	1.6	52.9	45.6
Södermanland	83.7	192,220	30.6	19.6	20.2	7.3	5.6	5.7	4.9	4.5	1.6	48.3	50.0
Östergötland	85.3	312,978	28.4	20.5	18.4	7.0	6.8	6.6	5.6	4.9	1.6	47.9	50.5
Jönköping	85.3	237,923	26.6	19.8	20.6	5.9	7.0	10.2	3.8	4.6	1.5	43.4	55.2
Kronoberg	85.2	129,194	27.7	20.0	20.3	7.6	6.3	8.0	4.4	4.4	1.3	46.0	52.7
Kalmar	85.3	162,919	29.0	18.7	21.4	6.1	6.4	8.4	4.1	4.2	1.5	45.7	52.7
Gotland	86.5	41,893	31.1	18.3	13.5	6.7	10.7	5.2	7.9	5.3	1.2	56.4	42.3
Blekinge	85.1	104,980	28.6	18.3	24.4	5.9	5.5	7.3	3.8	4.9	1.4	43.8	54.9
Malmö Municipality	79.9	213,883	29.0	16.5	13.1	17.2	5.9	3.3	9.3	4.6	1.2	61.3	37.5
Skåne W	82.1	202,175	26.1	20.1	24.0	7.8	5.3	5.2	4.4	5.7	1.3	43.6	55.1
Skåne S	87.2	272,960	22.8	23.3	19.8	6.0	8.0	5.3	7.3	6.5	1.1	44.0	54.9
Skåne NE	83.5	207,754	23.2	20.8	27.2	6.0	5.3	6.9	3.7	5.5	1.4	38.1	60.5
Halland	86.4	231,580	25.5	23.3	19.6	5.2	7.6	7.1	4.4	6.0	1.3	42.7	55.9
Göteborg Municipality	82.6	382,202	27.1	18.2	11.8	15.1	6.5	4.9	9.1	5.9	1.4	57.8	40.8
Västra Götaland W	87.6	260,409	25.3	21.5	18.2	6.3	7.4	7.2	6.3	6.3	1.4	45.3	53.2
Västra Götaland N	84.6	177,819	28.6	19.1	21.6	7.1	5.8	6.9	4.5	4.9	1.5	46.0	53.5
Västra Götaland S	84.5	147,181	27.3	19.6	20.7	7.1	6.7	7.9	4.3	4.7	1.7	45.3	53.2
Västra Götaland E	85.9	180,409	28.1	20.0	21.4	5.8	6.5	8.0	4.1	4.4	1.7	44.5	53.8
Värmland	84.9	186,269	31.0	20.1	19.7	5.8	6.1	6.9	4.4	4.5	1.6	47.3	51.1
Örebro	85.6	204,220	30.4	17.6	17.8	7.8	5.7	6.2	4.9	4.4	5.1	48.8	46.1
Västmanland	83.2	177,873	30.5	19.7	20.4	8.0	5.3	5.6	3.7	5.0	1.8	47.5	50.8
Dalarna	84.5	189,064	29.5	18.3	22.2	5.8	6.5	7.1	4.7	4.0	1.8	46.6	51.6
Gävleborg	83.6	185,731	31.8	17.7	21.5	6.8	6.1	6.2	4.2	4.0	1.7	48.9	49.4
Västernorrland	84.3	159,810	34.4	16.2	19.1	6.3	6.9	7.0	4.6	3.7	1.7	52.2	46.1
Jämtland	84.7	87,454	31.5	17.4	17.5	6.0	10.1	5.5	6.7	3.6	1.7	54.3	44.0
Västerbotten	85.3	182,272	36.9	15.4	12.7	9.3	7.2	5.9	7.5	3.5	1.5	61.0	37.5
Norrbotten	83.5	161,300	37.5	16.4	18.1	6.9	5.1	6.5	4.6	3.3	1.7	54.1	44.3
Total	84.8	6,735,557	28.0	19.8	17.5	8.4	7.0	6.2	6.1	5.3	1.6	49.6	48.8
Source: Sweden's Election Authority

=== Maps ===
Blocs' result by county

M's and SD's results by county

Coalition results, red (S, V, C, MP) to blue (M, SD, KD, L), shaded by strength

Largest party by municipality and constituency

==== By electoral district and collection district ====
Social Democrats

Moderate Party

Sweden Democrats

Left Party

Centre Party

Christian Democrats

Green Party

Liberals

Largest party by electoral district

Largest coalition by electoral district

=== Voter demographics ===
Sveriges Television exit polling (VALU) suggested the following demographic breakdown based on preliminary results to the nearest integer.

Cohort	Percentage of cohort voting for										
Cohort	S	M	SD	V	C	KD	MP	L	Oth	Opp.	Tidö
Gender
Women	33	18	13	9	7	6	8	5	1	57	42
Men	23	21	22	7	7	6	4	6	4	41	55
Age
18–21 years old	20	30	15	13	7	4	7	2	2	47	51
22–30 years old	23	22	17	14	6	5	7	3	3	50	47
31–64 years old	27	19	19	8	7	7	6	6	1	48	51
65 years old and older	36	17	15	4	7	6	5	7	3	52	45
Occupation
Blue-collar workers	31	15	25	10	4	6	4	3	2	49	49
White-collar workers	28	22	12	7	9	7	7	7	1	51	48
Entrepreneurs and farmers	15	23	23	6	11	6	6	8	2	38	60
Area type
Urban	27	20	15	9	8	5	8	6	2	52	46
Rural	28	20	20	7	7	7	5	5	1	47	52
Background
Swedish background	27	20	18	7	8	7	6	6	1	48	51
European background	29	19	14	10	7	6	7	5	3	53	44
Non-European background	37	13	10	21	4	4	5	2	4	67	29
Source: Sveriges Television (SVT Valu).

== Analysis ==
The result of the election marked a change in the balance within the two main blocs. The Sweden Democrats remained a major parliamentary force, but their decline to 17.5% and 62 seats represented their first fall in support at a general election after reaching 20.5% in 2022. At the same time, the Moderates consolidated their position as the second-largest party, while the Social Democrats remained the largest party despite a decline in their vote share, in what was its lowest since 1911. The Social Democrats received 28.0% of the vote, followed by the Moderates on 19.9%, the Sweden Democrats on 17.5%, the Left Party on 8.4%, the Centre Party on 7%, the Christian Democrats on 6.2%, the Green Party on 6.1%, and the Liberals on 5.3%.

The Social Democrats won every county, performing best in the northern Norrbotten County with 37.5% of the vote. However, the opposition bloc won just nine counties out of twenty one: Norrbotten, Västerbotten, Västernorrland, Jämtland, Västra Götaland, Örebro, Uppsala, and Gotland, as well as the capital, Stockholm. The latter saw the strongest result for the Left Party at 10.0% and the weakest for Sweden Democrats and Christian Democrats at 12.2% and 5.0%, respectively. Conversely, the right-wing bloc led by the Moderates prevailed in twelve counties; the party recorded its strongest result in Halland, where they also performed the best in regional elections. Overall, the Moderates improved to reach second place, while the Sweden Democrats fell to third, recording the first time the party's support declined. Nonetheless, the Sweden Democrats outran the Moderates in nine Tidö-won counties, performing well in Dalarna, Gävleborg, Västmanland, Södermanland, Kronoberg, Skåne, Kalmar, and Blekinge.

In respect to the constituencies, the Social Democrats won in 27 out of 29 districts, slipping behind the Moderates in Skåne S and ceding ground to the Sweden Democrats in Skåne NE. Overall, the left-wing bloc won in ten constituencies, performing strongest in the Malmö Municipality with 61.3% of the vote behind a very strong performance for the Left Party; having earned 17.2% of the vote, it beat out both the Moderates and the Sweden Democrats. Similarly, the party performed well in the Gothenburg and Stockholm Municipalities.

The narrow parliamentary majority of the opposition parties contrasted with the stronger position suggested by the final opinion polls as several surveys placed the four opposition parties above 50% of the vote, although their lead had narrowed in the final days of the campaign. The exit polls initially pointed to a wider opposition advantage, with SVT's Valu projecting 51.3% for the opposition against 46.8% for the Tidö parties and the Sweden Democrats, although the subsequent count produced a considerably closer result. As a result, the narrow parliamentary majority of the opposition left-leaning parties resulted less from a decisive shift toward one bloc than from changes in the relative strength of individual parties within both alliances.

The outcome left the opposition with a potentially difficult governing task. Although the four opposition parties together held 176 seats, differences between the Social Democrats, Left Party, Greens, and Centre Party could complicate the formation of a stable government. The result also disrupted the Sweden Democrats' previously expected path towards a formal role in government, which would have marked the first time that a far-right party entered the Swedish government, although the party remained influential within the broader right-wing bloc. Coalition negotiations consequently became central to the post-election process, with both blocs seeking to secure a workable parliamentary majority.

== Aftermath and government formation ==
=== Speaker election and government formation attempts ===
On 17 September, with the vote count completed, Prime Minister Kristersson announced that he had handed in his resignation to the speaker to allow the process of forming a new government to begin, with his government assuming a care-taker role pending the completion of the process. On 18 September and again on 2 October, Speaker Andreas Norlén formally gave Magdalena Andersson the assignment of forming a new government, but neither attempt has as yet been successful.

After Magdalena Andersson was tasked with forming a new government, a week passed by without any success in beginning talks. A new mandate period began on 28 September, and the election of a speaker and vice-speakers were also held on that day. The Social Democrats sought to have Johanna Haraldsson of their party become speaker, which received the support of the Greens and Centre Party; however, the Left Party supported Andreas Norlén of the Moderates, who had held the position since 2018, and Norlén was re-elected as speaker, providing him with formal oversight of the Prime Minister selection process.

Andersson announced on 13 Oct that the left-wing coalition had failed for a second time to form a government. The agreement stems from left-wing parties demanding inclusion of their members in the government's cabinet. Analysts have said Ulf Kristersson and the centre-right are hopeful to make a coalition with the Centre Party if negotiations continue to fail. Four failed attempts at government formation are allowed before new elections are called.

=== Electoral fraud investigations ===
On 21 September, Dagens industri reported that a preliminary investigation into potential electoral fraud in Borlänge, Dalarna, was underway. At the centre of the investigation was the election of Mohamed Abdukardir Ali to the Riksdag and Ahmed Abas Omar to the municipal council of Borlänge. Both managed to get elected ahead of candidates with higher positions on the Left Party lists by virtue of personal votes. Ali, a relatively unknown politician who had been a member of the Left Party for less than a year and a citizen since February, having immigrated from Somalia, received 648 personal votes, enough to take the Riksdag seat of Left Party's national climate spokesperson Kajsa Fredholm, who received about half as many.

Police began surveillance of suspicious activities during early voting in Borlänge in August, following an anonymous tip. People were observed attempting to get early voters to use Left Party ballots that had been pre-marked with personal votes. Aftonbladet reported that police had documented a person withdrawing money from an ATM and later handing out both money and ballots to voters, while SVT Nyheter reported that they had received information about financial transactions being involved in the investigation, but could not confirm allegations of vote-buying. It was also reported that the police observed a car driving voters to and from the early election locales; according to Expressen, the driver was a man of Somalian origin with a known criminal background, and according to SVT Nyheter the police noticed that rides were being given to voting locales when they were surveilling persons of interests in other criminal investigations. Dagens Nyheter reported that the activities suspected to be fraudulent targeted Somalian immigrants of three groups – women, men who did not intend on voting and men struggling with substance abuse.

The police reported their findings to the Swedish Prosecution Authority on 1 September. The investigation was halted on 8 September after the Prosecution Authority deemed there was insufficient evidence to move forward with it. A separate criminal complaint was filed by Dalarna's county administrative board on 13 September after they received reports of electoral fraud. The Prosecution Authority resumed the investigation after the election, which according to prosecutor Edvard Oskarsson was because new evidence had become available.

Ali denied having any involvement in the alleged incidents, stating that he was shocked when informed of the investigation. On 22 September, after nearly a full day of declining to comment, the Left Party went out with a statement saying that Ali had agreed to take a "time out" from politics while the investigation was ongoing. Ahmed Abas Omar stated that he would do the same. Ali later criticized the media reporting on the investigation for focusing on his Somalian background, economic situation (Note: He was previously denied Swedish citizenship in 2024 for having large debts, and was undergoing debt sanitation at the time of the election.) and for portraying him as not having participated in the Left Party's campaigning for the election, which he stated was incorrect. Party leader Nooshi Dadgostar continued to refuse to give comment until 24 September, attributing the delay to a need to investigate first. She stated that the allegations were serious but that the Left Party would wait for the investigation to finish, and that the situation would not affect their position on government formation.

On 24 September, Svenska Dagbladet published an editorial alleging improprieties in the election in Järva, Solna Municipality, based on anonymous sources. The following day, Swedish police announced that they were opening investigations into five separate complaints of electoral fraud in Stockholm County, including one in Järva, one in Nacka, two in Sigtuna and one covering several locations across the entire country.

As of 29 September 2026, the Election Review Board had received 15,000 appeals against the election, a large increase from the 700 and 400 appeals of 2018 and 2022 respectively, and vastly more than seen in any previous election.

== See also ==
- 1911 Swedish general election
- 2010 Swedish general election
- 2024 European Parliament election in Sweden
- 2026 elections in the European Union
- 2026 Swedish local elections
- Basic Laws of Sweden
- History of Sweden (1991–present)
- Politics of Sweden
