= 2030 Swedish general election =

2030 election for the Swedish parliament

- 8 September 2030

All 349 seats to the Riksdag 175 seats needed for a majority
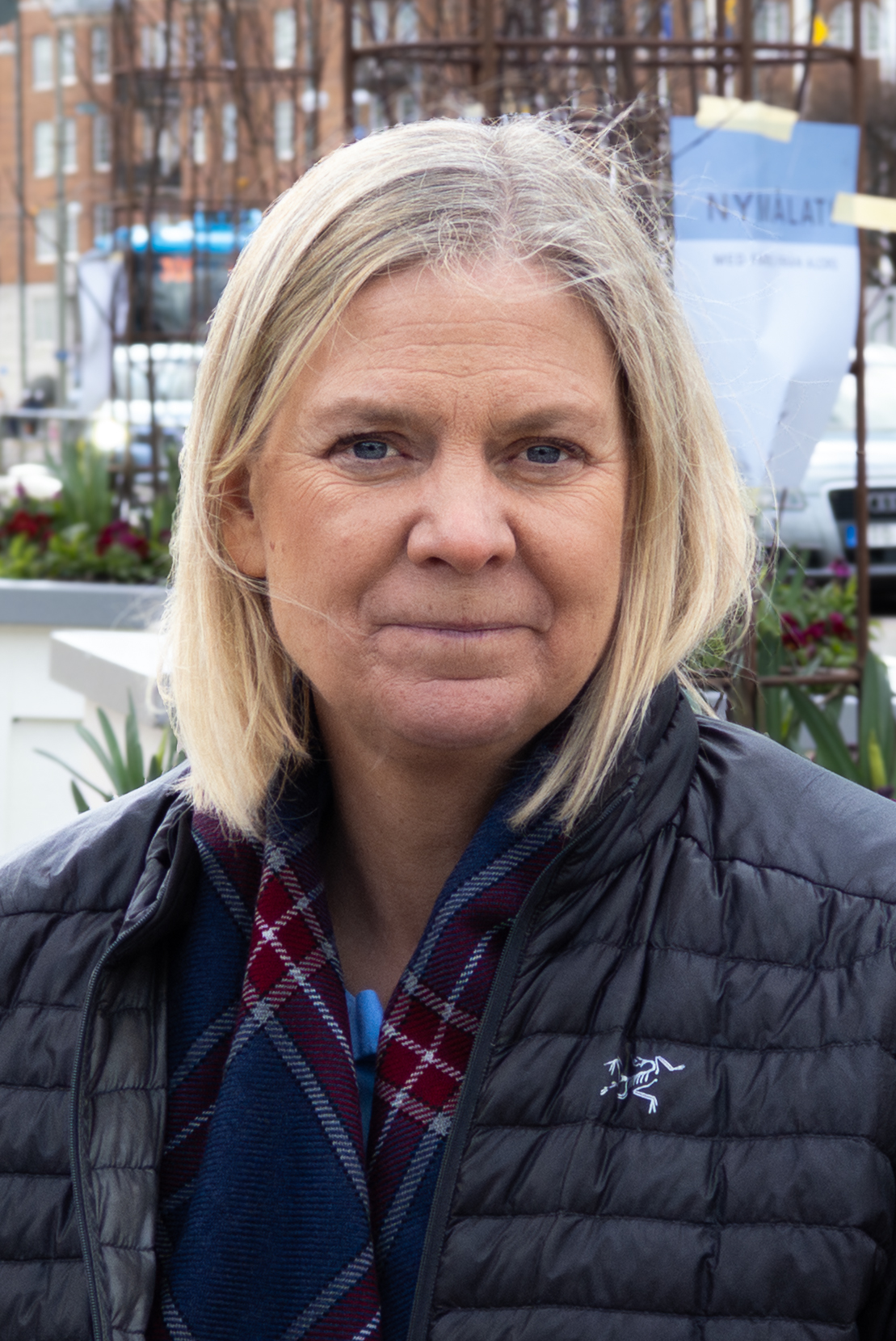

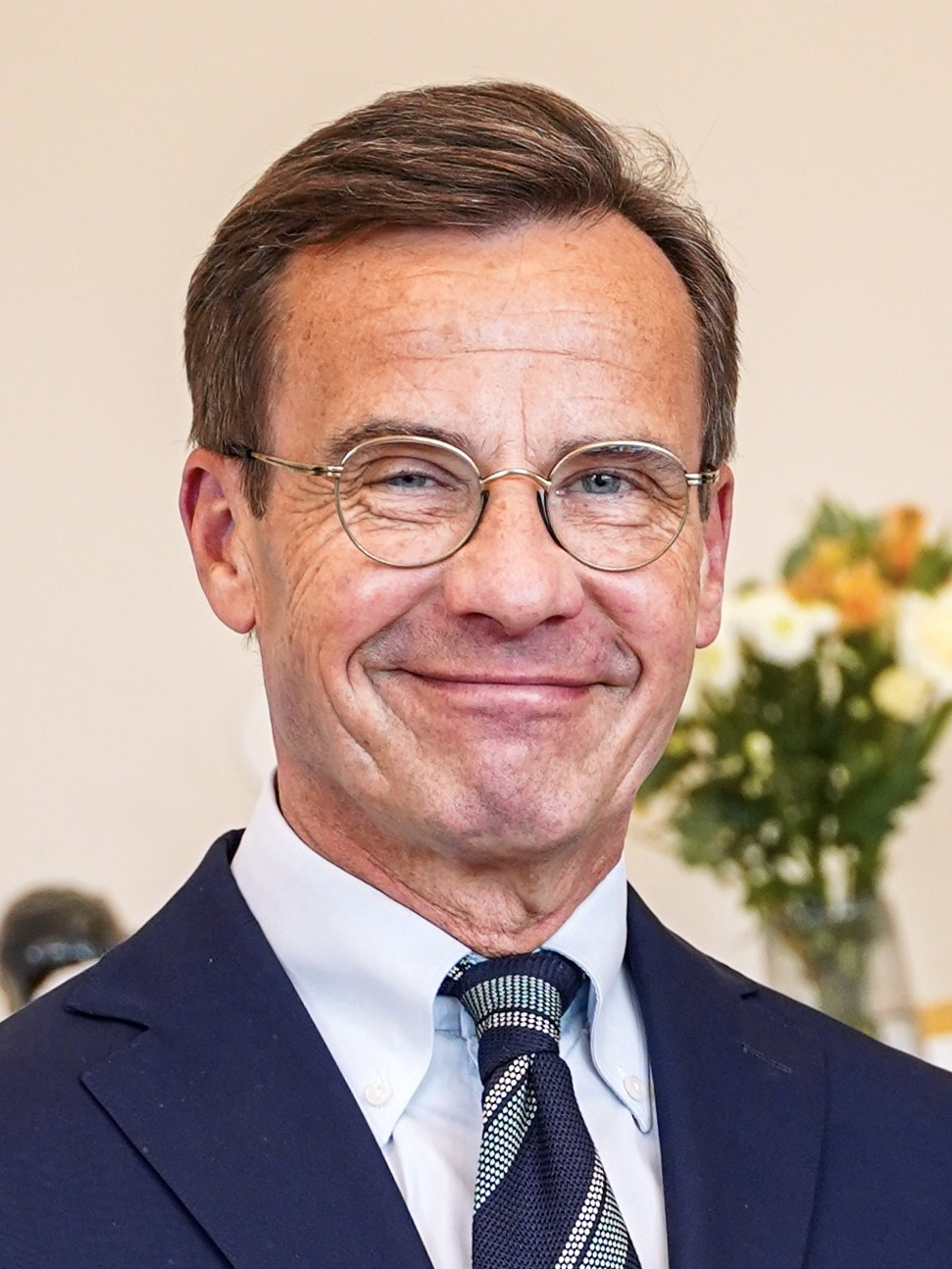

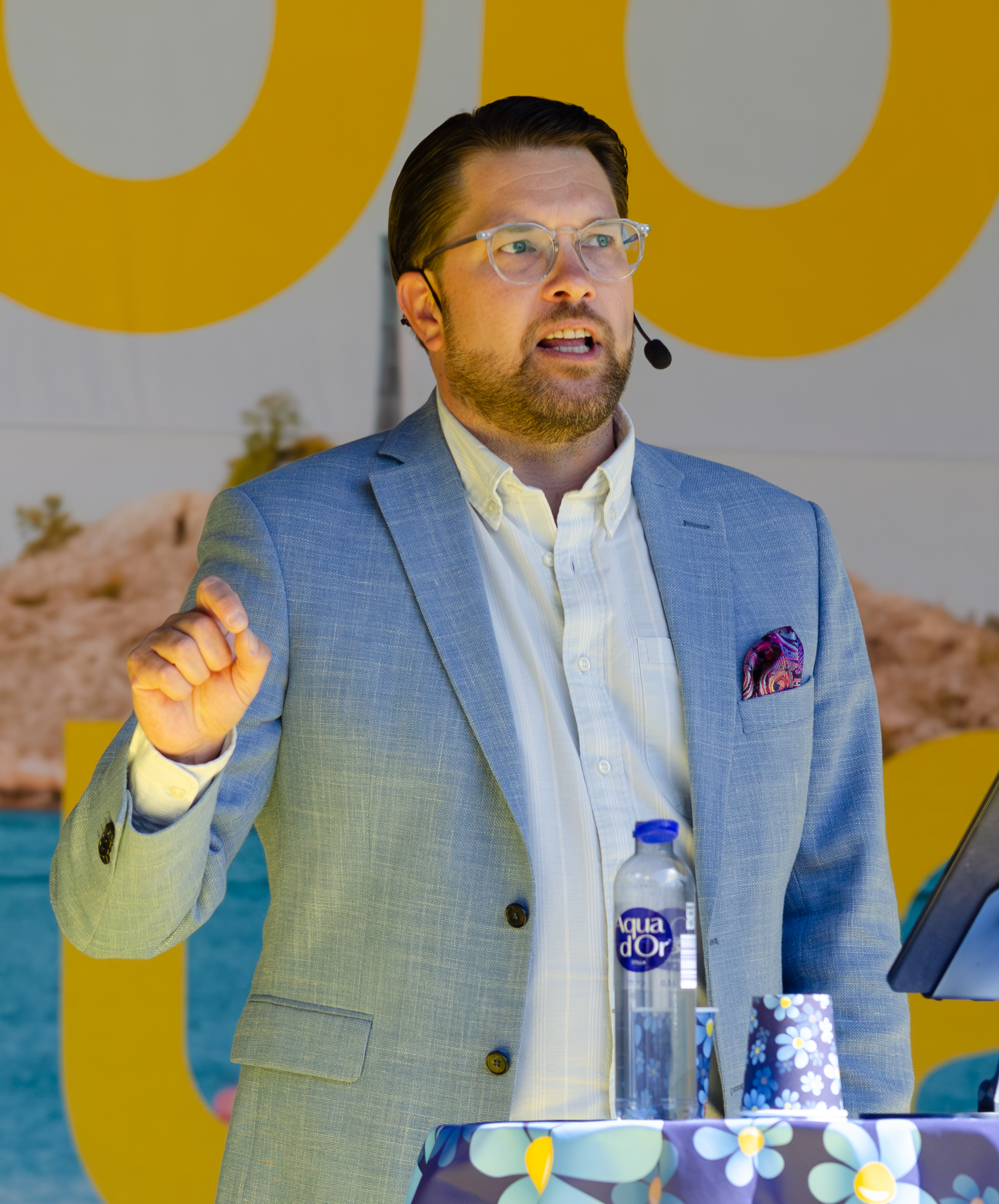

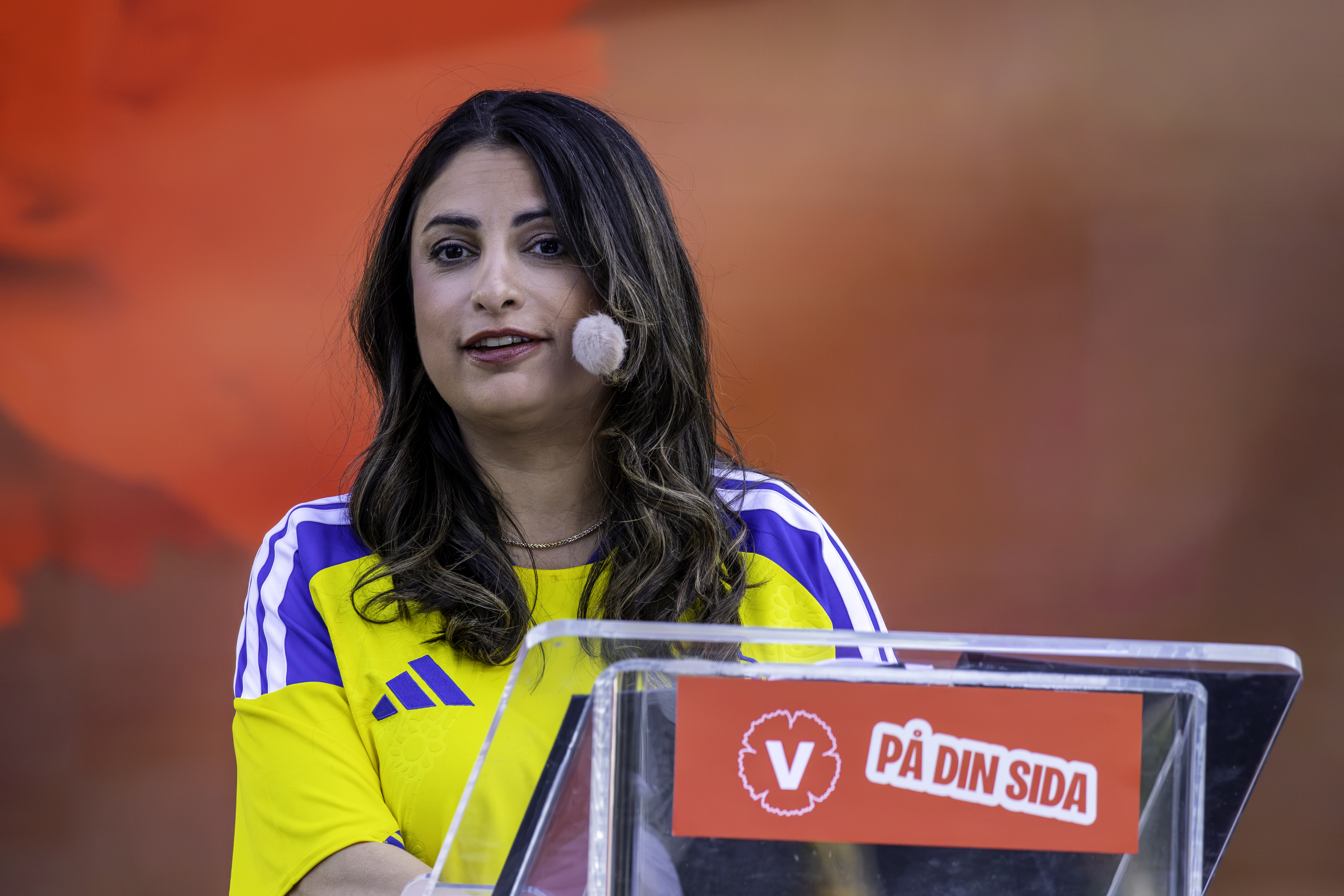

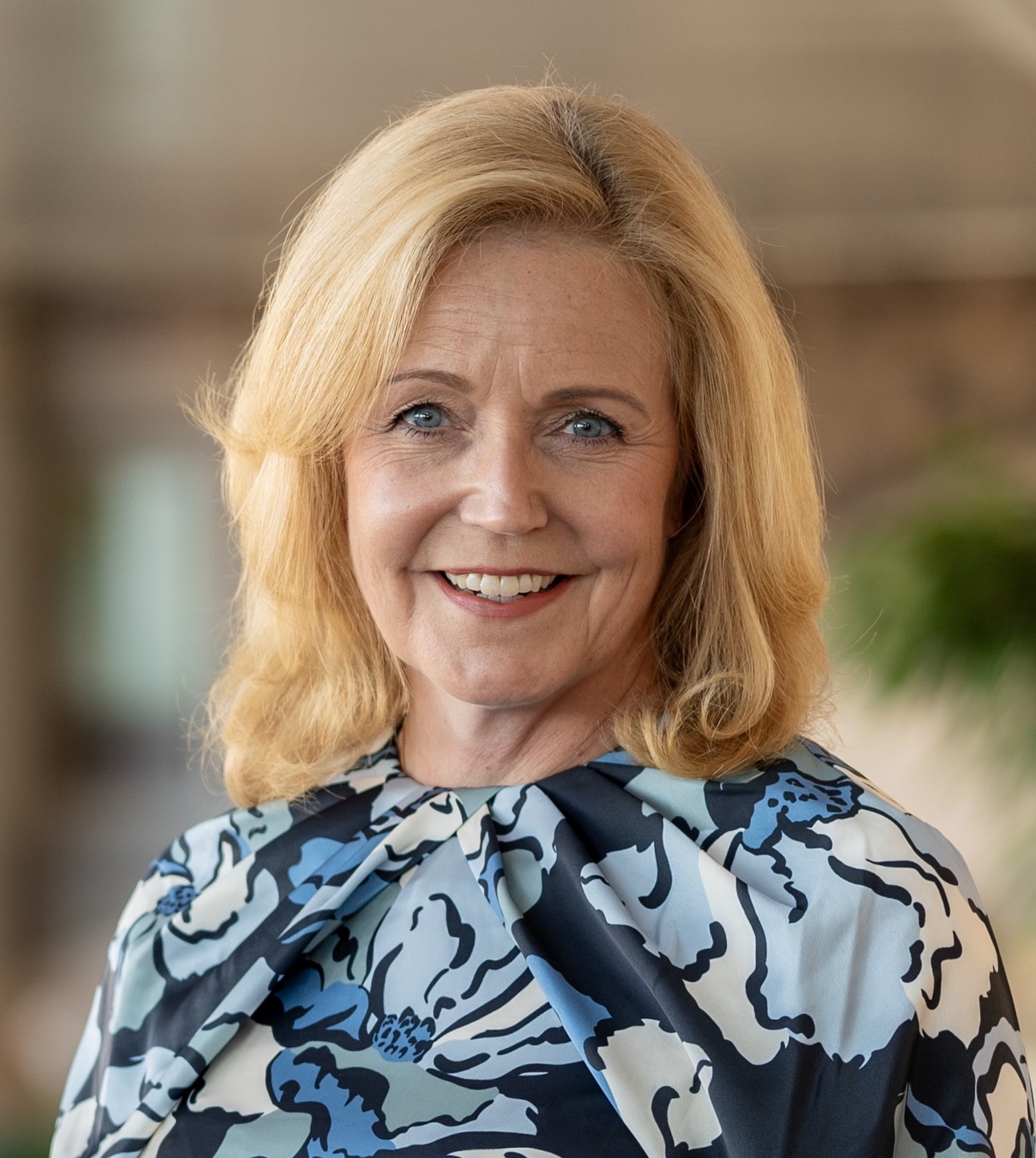

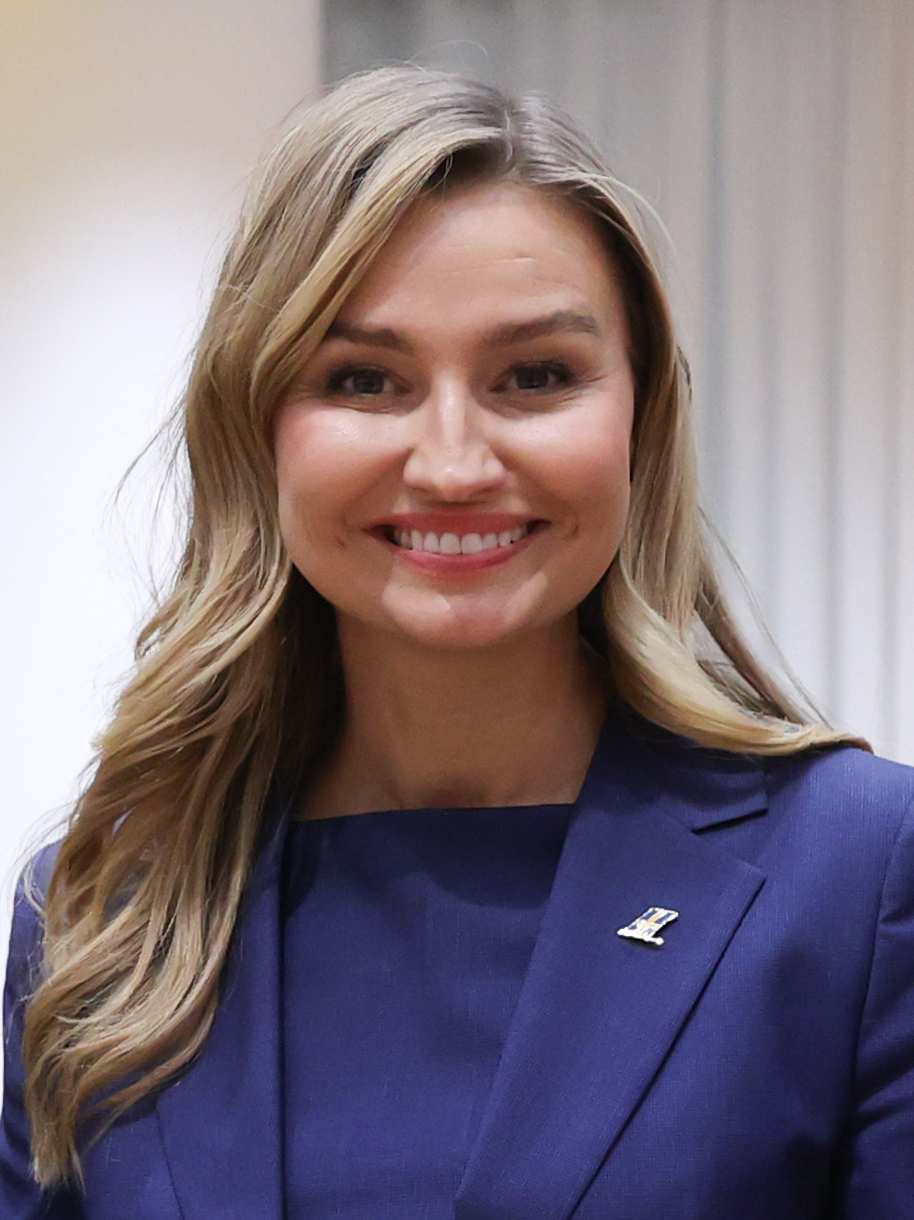

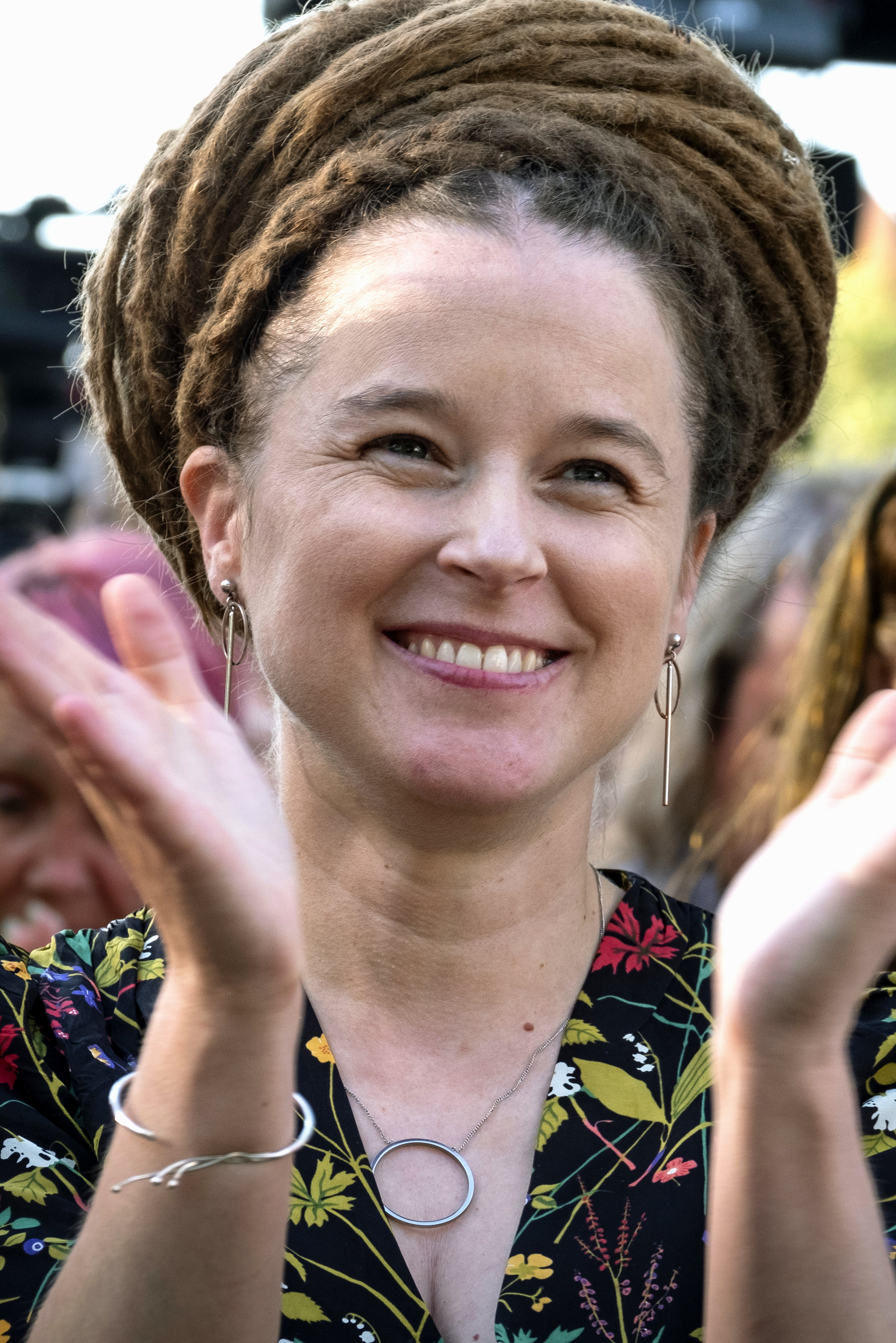

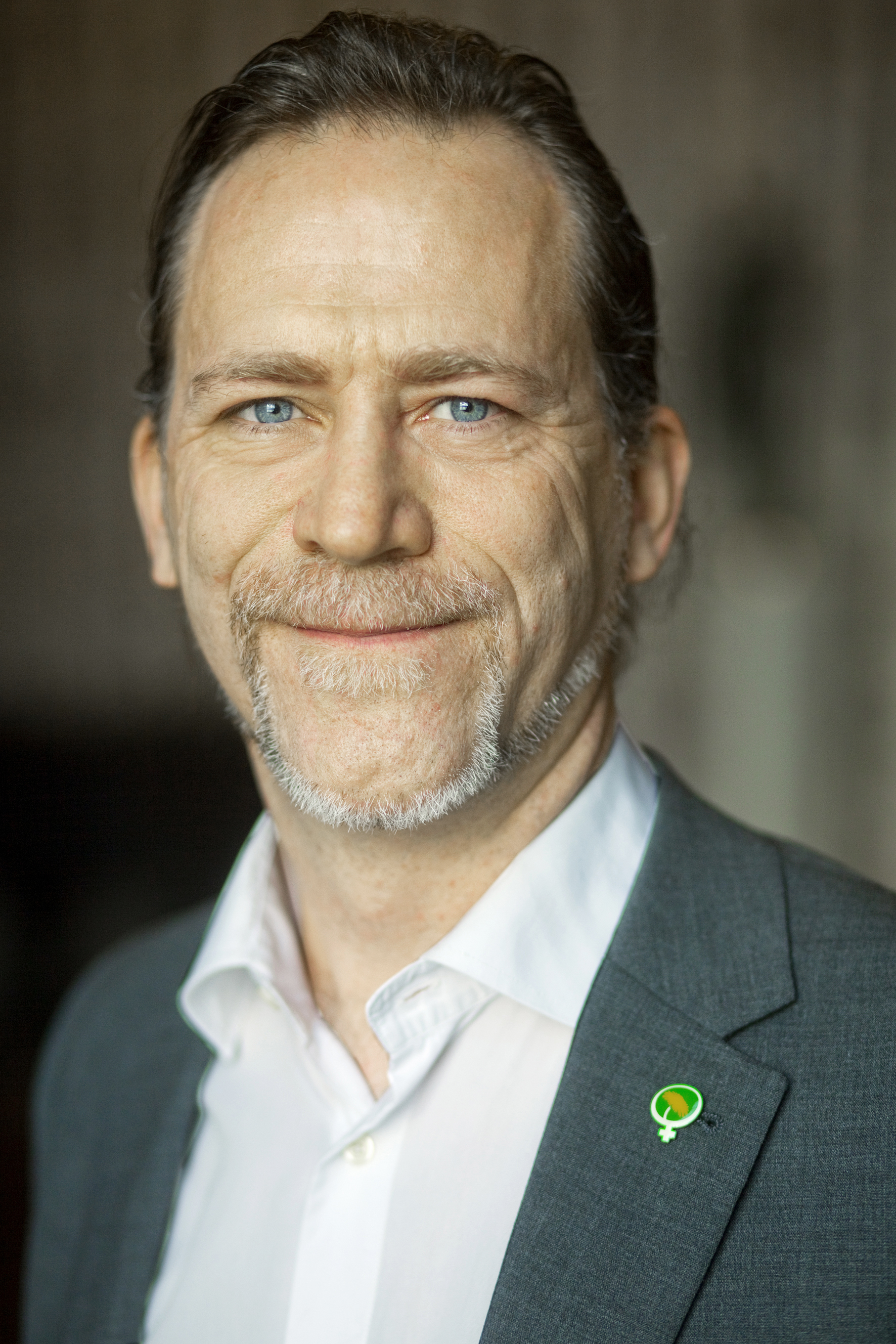

	First party	Second party	Third party
Leader	Magdalena Andersson	Ulf Kristersson	Jimmie Åkesson
Party	Social Democrats	Moderate	Sweden Democrats
Leader's seat	Stockholm County	Södermanland County	Örebro County
Last election	28.0%, 99 seats	19.9%, 70 seats	17.5%, 62 seats
	Fourth party	Fifth party	Sixth party
Leader	Nooshi Dadgostar	Elisabeth Thand Ringqvist	Ebba Busch
Party	Left	Centre	Christian Democrats
Leader's seat	Stockholm County	Stockholm Municipality	Örebro County
Last election	8.4%, 30 seats	7.0%, 25 seats	6.2%, 22 seats
	Seventh party	Eighth party
Leader	Amanda Lind; Daniel Helldén	Simona Mohamsson
Party	Green	Liberals
Leader's seat	Stockholm County; Stockholm Municipality	Göteborg Municipality
Last election	6.1%, 22 seats	5.3%, 19 seats
Prime Minister before election
TBD
Prime Minister after election
TBD

A general election will be held in Sweden on 8 September 2030 to elect the 349 members of the Riksdag, alongside municipal and regional elections. They in turn will elect the prime minister. In case of a snap election, the parliamentary term would not be reset and the election would still be held in September 2030.

== Electoral system ==
The Riksdag is made up of 349 seats elected by open lists and proportional representation, with an electoral threshold of 4% of the national vote or alternatively 12% within a single constituency. Of the 349 seats, 310 are elected from 29 constituencies ranging in size from 2 to 41 seats, while the other 39 seats are apportioned nationally as levelling seats to ensure parties that passed the 4% national threshold hold a proportional number of seats; these levelling seats are allocated to particular districts. If a party wins more constituency seats than it is entitled to overall, a redistribution of constituency seats may occur to reduce the number of constituency seats won by that party.

General elections are held on a fixed date, the second Sunday of September, at the same time as the municipal and regional elections. If early elections are called, the newly elected legislature only serves out the remainder of the four-year term begun by the previous legislature.

== Political parties ==
The table below lists political parties represented in the Riksdag after the 2026 general election.

Abbr.	Name	Ideology	Political position	Leader	2026 result		Pre-election
Abbr.	Name	Ideology	Political position	Leader	Votes (%)	Seats	
S	Swedish Social Democratic Party; Socialdemokraterna	Social democracy	Centre-left	Magdalena Andersson	28.0%	99 / 349	99 / 349
M	Moderate Party; Moderaterna	Liberal conservatism	Centre-right	Ulf Kristersson	19.9%	70 / 349	70 / 349
SD	Sweden Democrats; Sverigedemokraterna	Right-wing populism	Right-wing to far-right	Jimmie Åkesson	17.5%	62 / 349	62 / 349
V	Left Party; Vänsterpartiet	Socialism	Left-wing	Nooshi Dadgostar	8.4%	30 / 349	30 / 349
C	Centre Party; Centerpartiet	Liberalism; Nordic agrarianism	Centre to centre-right	Elisabeth Thand Ringqvist	7.0%	25 / 349	25 / 349
KD	Christian Democrats; Kristdemokraterna	Christian democracy	Right-wing	Ebba Busch	6.2%	22 / 349	22 / 349
MP	Green Party; Miljöpartiet	Green politics	Centre-left	Amanda Lind Daniel Helldén	6.1%	22 / 349	22 / 349
L	Liberals; Liberalerna	Conservative liberalism	Centre-right	Simona Mohamsson	5.3%	19 / 349	19 / 349

== Opinion polls ==
=== Graphical summary ===
S M SD V C KD MP L

=== 2026 ===
Polling execution			Parties										Blocs		
Polling firm	Fieldwork date	Sample size	V	S	MP	C	L	M	KD	SD	Others	Lead	Red-Green	Blue-Yellow	Lead
Novus	6–15 Nov 2026	2,387	7.2	24.9	7.3	6.6	3.6	26.5	4.9	17.3	1.7	1.6	46.0	52.3	6.3
Verian	26 Oct–8 Nov 2026	3,000	8.5	26.1	7.5	5.7	4.1	23.3	6.3	16.9	1.6	2.8	47.8	50.6	2.8
Indikator	7–25 Oct 2026	4,000	7.6	27.0	7.3	5.8	3.8	26.3	4.8	16.3	1.1	0.7	47.7	51.2	3.5
Ipsos	13–25 Oct 2026	1,589	8.0	27.0	6.0	6.0	4.0	24.0	5.0	19.0	1.0	3.0	48.0	52.0	4.0
Novus	5–11 Oct 2026	2,512	7.2	25.9	6.5	6.7	3.9	23.9	6.4	18.0	1.5	2.0	46.3	52.2	5.9
Verian	28 Sep–11 Oct 2026	3,000	7.8	28.5	7.1	6.3	3.7	22.3	5.9	17.2	1.2	6.2	49.7	49.1	0.6
Ipsos	15–27 Sep 2026	1,694	8.0	28.0	6.0	7.0	4.0	22.0	6.0	17.0	2.0	6.0	49.0	49.0	Tie
Sentio	21–25 Sep 2026	1,000	10.0	25.7	5.7	5.4	4.1	22.7	5.6	19.4	1.4	3.0	46.8	51.8	5.0
2026 election result		–	8.4	28.0	6.1	7.0	5.3	19.9	6.2	17.5	1.6	8.1	49.6	48.8	0.8

=== Seat projections ===
Polling execution			Parties										Blocs		
Polling firm	Fieldwork date	Sample size	V	S	MP	C	L	M	KD	SD	Others	Lead	Red-Green	Blue-Yellow	Lead
Verian	26 Oct–8 Nov 2026	3,000	30	92	27	20	15	83	22	60	0	9	169	180	11
Indikator	7–25 Oct 2026	4,000	28	99	27	21	0	96	18	60	0	3	175	174	1
Verian	28 Sep–11 Oct 2026	3,000	29	104	26	23	0	82	22	63	0	22	182	167	15
2026 election result		–	30	99	22	25	19	70	22	62	0	29	176	173	3
