= Fredrik Kärrholm =

Swedish politician (born 1985)

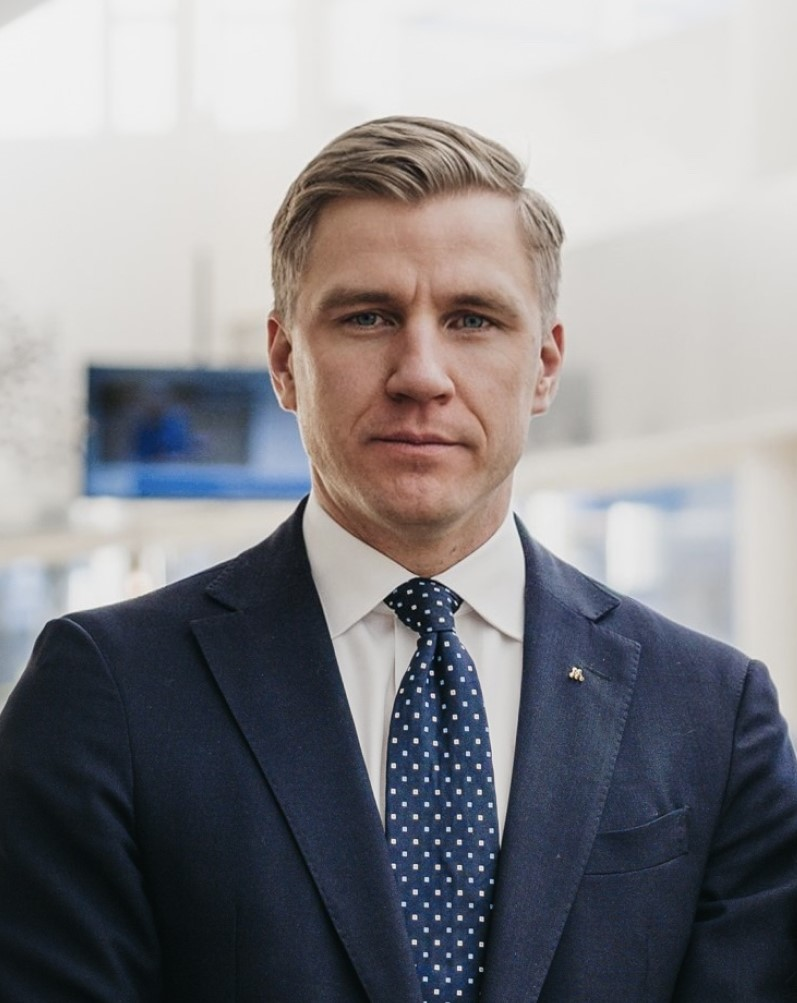
- Fredrik Kärrholm (2023)

Member of the Riksdag
- Incumbent
- Assumed office 26 September 2022
- Constituency: Stockholm Municipality

Personal details
- Born: 1985 (age 40–41)
- Party: Moderate Party

Fredrik Kärrholm (born 1985) is a Swedish politician of the Moderate Party, author and former police officer. Since September 2022, he serves as Member of the Riksdag representing the constituency of Stockholm Municipality. He is affiliated with the Moderate Party.

== Biography ==
=== Education and career ===
Kärrholm holds a police degree from Stockholm Police Academy, a bachelor's degree in criminology from Stockholm University and a master's degree in criminology from Cambridge University. He attended Timbro's Sture Academy in 2010 and has a degree in writing from the TT News Agency's journalism school.

Kärrholm worked as a police officer from 2009 to 2021 in various different positions. He was a criminal inspector in Rinkeby, a strategic analyst for the Swedish Police Authority and head of analysis at the police's national intelligence unit. From 2021 to 2022, he was security expert in the business sector and CEO of Svensk Bakkundersanalys.

=== Written and political work ===
Kärrholm wrote an article for Dagens Nyheter in 2009 criticising the Swedish Police Authority for unfair hiring practices and using positive discrimination quotas in police recruitment. The Swedish Police Authority later admitted the quotas existed and in 2015 were forced to pay damages to those affected. He has also worked as a columnist for Svenska Dagbladet since 2012.

In 2020, Kärrholm published the book Gangstervåld (Gangster Violence) documenting the rise of violent crime in Sweden within the past few years which he followed up with an article in Dagens Nyheter about the need for tougher prison sentences. In 2024, he published Lag & Ordning (Law & Order) in which Kärrholm attempts to take a holistic approach to crime with causal analyses, measures and balancing of interests, with a liberal conservative starting point. In the book, he outlines how criminal policy should develop in the long term.

=== Politician ===
For the 2022 Swedish general election, Kärrholm was elected as a Member of the Riksdag for the Moderate Party to represent the Stockholm Municipality. He is a member of the Justice Committee, Social Insurance Committee and the Civil Affairs Committee and takes up Seat 314 in the Riksdag.

In politics, Kärrholm has argued for stronger policies on crime and for patriotism to be more positively embraced in Swedish society.

In 2024, he wrote in defense of chairman of the Justice Committee and Sweden Democrats politician Richard Jomshof after the latter got into a dispute with Left Party parliamentarian Daniel Riazat, arguing that Riazat had refused to participate in a Riksdag custom of shaking hands with opposition politicians after a debate.

=== El-Haj affair ===
Following the October 7 attacks, Kärrholm claimed that Social Democratic Party member of parliament Jamal El-Haj was a security risk and had connections to Hamas and urged Social Democratic leader Magdalena Andersson to expel him from the party during an interview with Svenska Dagbladet and posts on Twitter. El-Haj accused Kärrholm of "spreading outright lies" and reported him to the police for defamation. In a counter-article, Kärrholm declined to apologize and maintained that El-Haj was unsuitable as a member of parliament and a security risk due to his alleged connections with Islamist groups. In 2024, El-Haj was subsequently expelled from the Social Democrats after using his position in parliament to secretly block the deportation of an extremist imam to Egypt.
