= Unity Party (Sweden) =

Unity Party Enighetspartiet
- President: Jamal El-Haj
- Vice President: Ana Sarmiento Sánchez
- Founder: Jamal El-Haj; Ana Sarmiento Sánchez
- Founded: 12 August 2025
- Split from: Swedish Social Democratic Party
- Headquarters: Malmö
- Ideology: Pro-immigration; Multiculturalism
- Political position: Left-wing
- Colours: Blue; Yellow; Red
- Riksdag: 1 / 349
- European Parliament: 0 / 21

Website
- enighetspartiet.se

The Unity Party (Swedish: Enighetspartiet) is a Swedish political party founded by independent member of the Riksdag, Jamal El-Haj in the summer of 2025, a year after his expulsion from the Swedish Social Democratic Party. The party describes itself as pro-immigration.

== History ==
=== Background ===
Jamal El-Haj has been a member of the Riksdag for the Social Democratic Party since 2018, being re-elected in 2022. In the spring of 2023, El-Haj caused a controversy when, despite his party's advice, he participated in a Palestine conference with links to the Hamas movement.

On 7 February 2024, a leaked document revealed El-Haj's attempt to use his position in the Riksdag to influence the Swedish Migration Agency regarding the asylum application of a controversial conservative Muslim Egyptian imam. Furthermore, it was revealed that he had asked the agency to conceal his attempts to influence the decision. Following widespread public outcry, on 9 February 2024, the Social Democratic Party declared a loss of confidence in El-Haj and demanded his resignation from Riksdag. El-Haj left the party but retained his seat as an independent.

In early 2024, El-Haj rejected an attempt to recruit him from the Nuance Party.

In July 2025, it was reported that El-Haj had gathered associations and imams in support of the Unity Party, which had already submitted an application to the Election Authority in mid-June. One of the meetings Jamal El-Haj held was with the Iraq Turkmen Peace Association in Malmö. The party was co-founded by Ana Sarmiento Sánchez, a doctor who describes herself as "dissatisfied with the current party politics." It was reported that about 100 people from different cultural and religious backgrounds participated in the creation of the party.

=== Formation ===
On 30 August 2025, the Swedish Arabic-language newspaper Alkompis reported that Jamal El-Haj publicly announced the launch of his Unity Party in Malmö at a meeting attended by approximately 80 people. Earlier, on 12 August 2025, the Election Authority registered notice of participation of the Unity Party in the 2026 Swedish general election, the 2029 European Parliament election, as well as 2026 regional and local elections. The party published its 17-point program on Instagram and announced its participation in the 2026 elections.

On 18 February 2026, El-Haj announced on his Facebook page that the Unity Party would not participate in the 2026 elections at any level. He stated that in recent months, many party members had been "exposed to repeated attacks and questioning that have damaged both us and the democratic conversation." According to El-Haj, he will remain in Riksdag until the end of his term in September, and that the Unity Party will aim for the next EU and 2030 general elections.

== Ideology ==
According to the party program, it has four core values: international solidarity, humanism, economic equality and climate responsibility. The Unity Party describes itself as pro-immigration, stating that "Sweden needs more immigration - not less". The party also highlights one of its goals as combating the hatred directed against Muslims, "a situation that is often overlooked." According to the party's co-founder and vice president Ana Sarmiento Sánchez, the party's core values are human rights, equality and social justice, sustainable development and environmental responsibility, international solidarity and global cooperation, democracy and openness, economic justice and equality. Sánchez stated that the Unity Party stands as a counterpoint to the right-wing populist wave in Sweden, as in the rest of the Western world.
