= Future Left (Sweden) =

Socialist political party in Sweden

Future Left Framtidens Vänster
- Abbreviation: FV
- Leaders: Daniel Riazat; Lorena Delgado Varas
- Founded: 5 December 2025; 9 months ago
- Split from: Left Party
- Ideology: Socialism; Feminism; Anti-militarism
- European affiliation: Party of the European Left
- Colours: Red; Purple
- Riksdag: 2 / 349
- European Parliament: 0 / 21
- County councils: 0 / 1,720
- Municipal councils: 1 / 12,614

Website
- framtidensvanster.se

Future Left (Swedish: Framtidens Vänster, FV) is a socialist political party and movement in Sweden launched on 5 December 2025 by members of Parliament (MP) Daniel Riazat and Lorena Delgado Varas. Both founders left the Left Party earlier in 2025 following internal conflicts and the initiation of expulsion procedures against them.

== History ==
In 2025, the leadership of the Left Party initiated expulsion procedures against both Lorena Delgado Varas and Daniel Riazat. In Delgado Varas' case, the dispute partly concerned a social media post that some internal critics claimed was antisemitic, which Delgado Varas denied.

Riazat stated publicly that the expulsion processes against both him and Delgado Varas were rooted in deeper political and organisational disagreements within the Left Party, including disputes over foreign policy, the question of Palestine, and internal democracy. Both MPs left the Left Party in August 2025 and continued to sit in the Riksdag as independent members.

Future Left was launched formally in December 2025. At the launch, the founders stated that the project aimed to build a broad grassroots movement and argued that established left-wing parties no longer represented a sufficiently radical or internationally solidaristic political line. For the 2026 Swedish general election, their focus is on local elections of municipalities and regions, and not the Riksdag.

Future Left joined the Party of the European Left during its 8th Congress on 17 April 2026.

== Ideology ==
Top priorities for the party include housing, the climate, feminism, international solidarity and equal opportunity. It is critical towards the arms industry, including Sweden's military aid to Ukraine.

== See also ==
- Politics of Sweden
