= Daniel Riazat =

Swedish politician (born 1991)

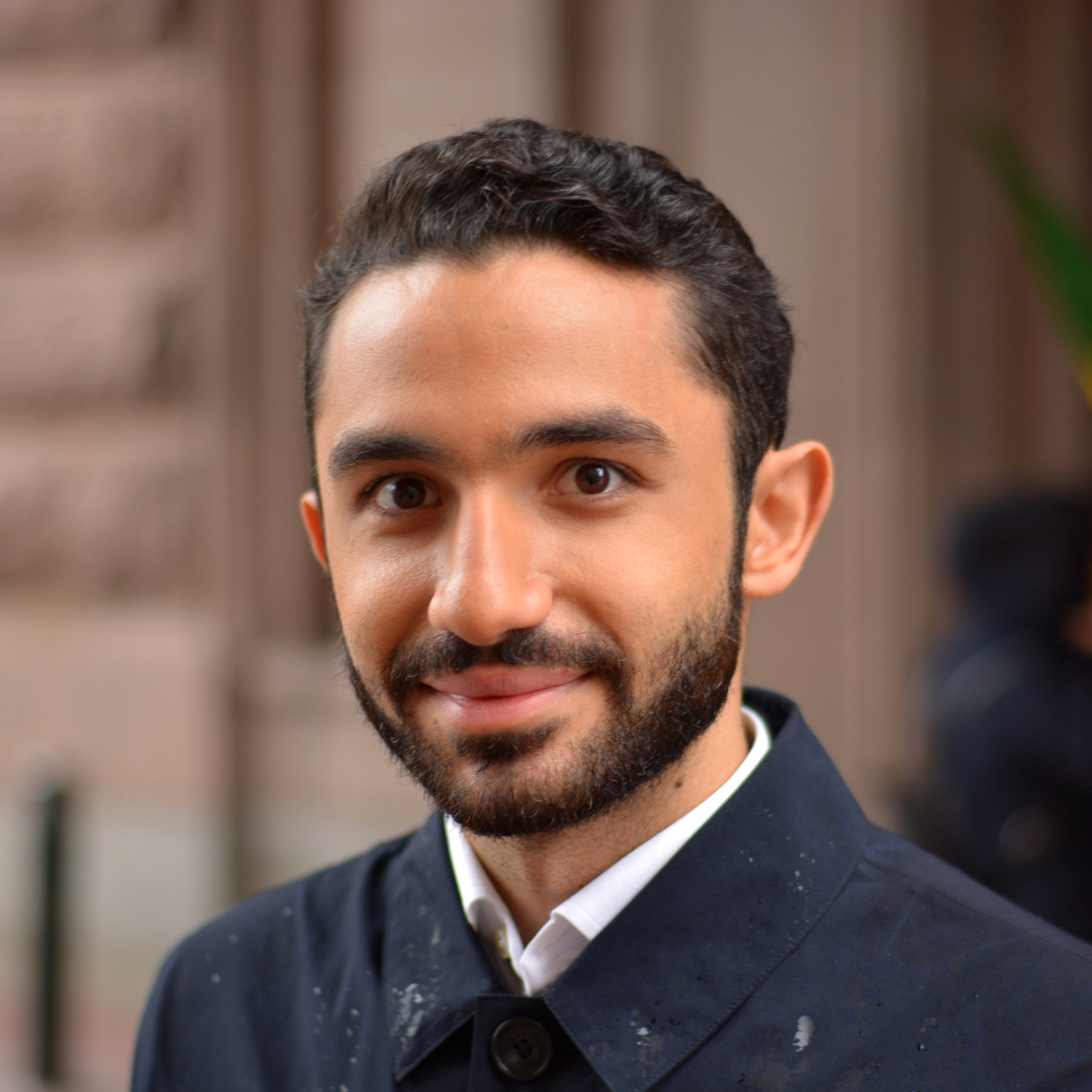
- Riazat in 2015

Member of the Riksdag
- Incumbent
- Assumed office 29 September 2014
- Constituency: Stockholm County (2022–present); Dalarna County (2014–2022)

Personal details
- Born: 10 March 1991 (age 35) Teheran, Iran
- Party: Future Left (since 2025)
- Other political affiliations: Left Party (until 2025)

Daniel Riazat (born 10 March 1991) is a Swedish politician who serves as member of Parliament since 29 September 2014. Formerly part of the Left Party, he represented the constituency of Dalarna County from 2014 to 2022 and since 2022 he represents Stockholm County.

== Early life and career ==
Riazat was born in Tehran in 1991. His parents were both active in the communist movement and decided to flee Iran after visits from the security services. Riazat initially came to Sweden in 2000 with his mother and sister. They were given a deportation order in 2004 but later granted residency after they were joined by Riazat's father. He began studying for a degree in political science but dropped out before completing it. In 2012, Riazat was involved in an altercation with neo-Nazis during an anti-racism meeting in Ludvika in which he was physically assaulted. Three people were arrested in connection with the assault.

== Member of the Riksdag ==
Riazat was elected as member of the Riksdag in September 2018 and September 2022. He has also served as a municipal councilor in Falun since 2010. During Almedalen Week in 2022, Riazat posed with the Kurdish PKK's flag while speaking at a rally for the Left Party; this caused a stir since the PKK is classified as a terrorist group in Sweden.

In 2024, Riazat came under criticism from Moderate Party politician Fredrik Kärrholm for allegedly refusing to shake a hands with opposition politicians after a debate in the Riksdag, which is often customary. That same year, he also came into conflict with Richard Jomshof. The row started after Riazat said that he wanted to move out of an apartment building allocated to Riksdag members after discovering Mattias Karlsson lived in the building and called the Sweden Democrats a neo-Nazi party. Jomshof responded on Twitter ("Daniel Riazat thus wanted to move away from Mattias Karlsson. Personally, I think he should move from Sweden") and Riazat later claimed Jomshof's comment led to racist abuse on social media.

In 2025, Riazat announced he was leaving the Left Party and becoming an independent politician in the Riksdag after he and Lorena Delgado Varas had party exclusion cases initiated against them. Together, they founded the Future Left party. Riazat claimed that the Left Party was becoming a "doormat for the Social Democrats" under leader Nooshi Dadgostar.
