= Richard Jomshof =

Swedish politician (born 1969)

Richard Jomshof SD
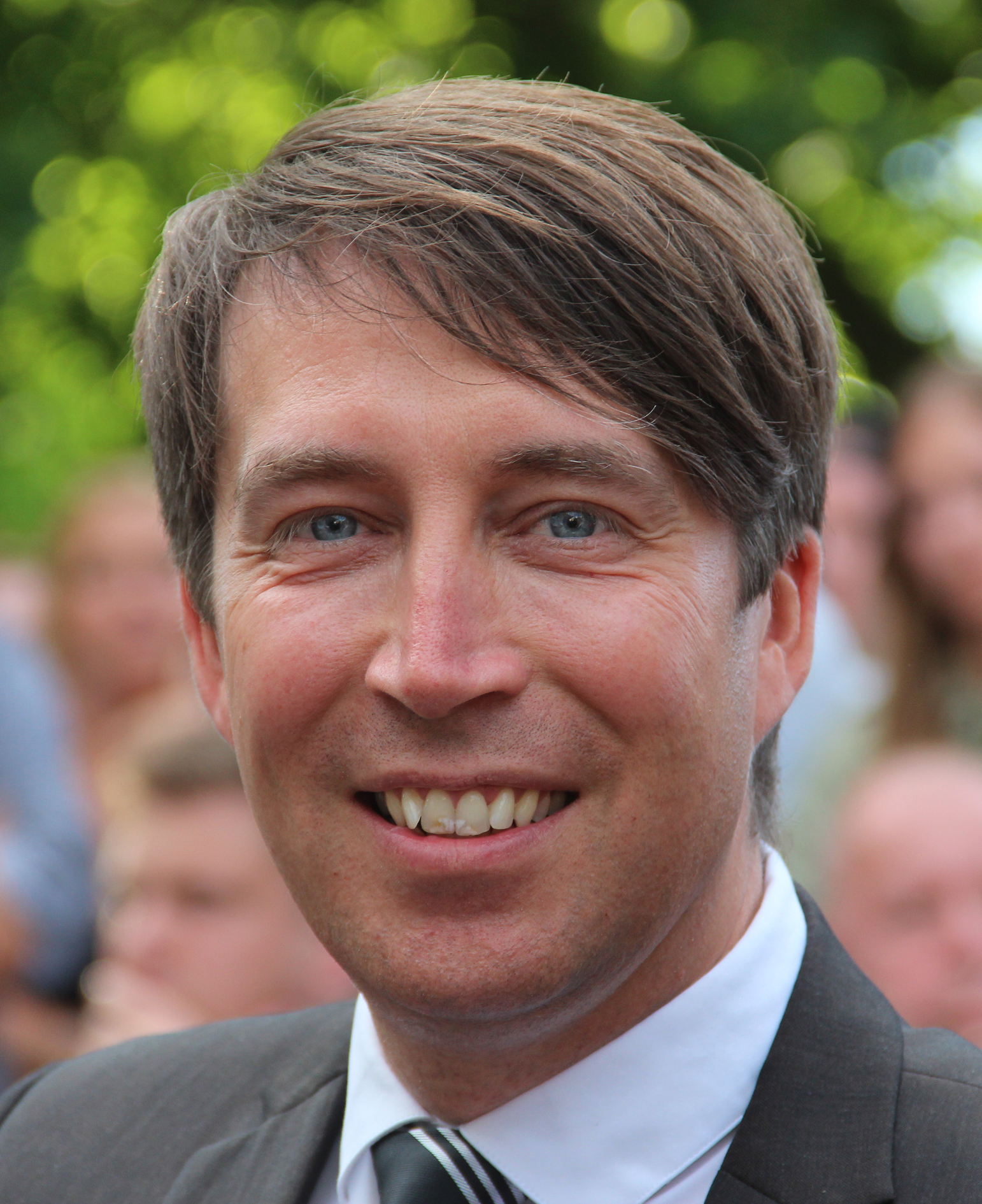
- Richard Jomshof during the Almedalen Week in July 2016

Secretary-General of the Sweden Democrats
- In office 11 January 2015 – 17 October 2022
- Leader: Jimmie Åkesson
- Preceded by: Björn Söder
- Succeeded by: Mattias Bäckström Johansson

Member of the Riksdag
- Incumbent
- Assumed office 19 September 2010
- Constituency: Blekinge County (2014-present); Gävleborg County (2010-2014)

Personal details
- Born: Richard Johannes Lohikoski; 6 July 1969 (age 57) Helsingborg, Sweden
- Party: Sweden Democrats
- Spouse: Linda Jomshof
- Education: Malmö University; Lund University

Richard Johannes Jomshof, né Lohikoski, (born 6 July 1969 in Helsingborg) is a Swedish politician affiliated with the Sweden Democrats (SD) party and former pop musician. He worked as a teacher and was active in the music industry before he was elected as a Member of the Riksdag in September 2010. He served as Secretary-General of the Sweden Democrats from 2015 to 2022. In 2022, he was appointed as chairman of the Justice Committee in the Riksdag and held the position until 2025.

== Biography ==
=== Education and early career ===
Jomshof was born in 1969 in Helsingborg to a Swedish mother and a Finnish father. He studied history and social studies at Malmö University before attending the university's affiliated teacher training college and subsequently worked as a secondary school geography and history teacher. Jomshof was according to himself dismissed from two teaching jobs for being part of Sweden Democrats.

=== Music career ===
After his teaching studies, Jomshof became a musician and was active in the Swedish music scene, co-founding and playing in the Swedish synthpop band Elegant Machinery. The group proved successful in Sweden before disbanding in 1999. They reformed in 2001 before Jomshof departed the group in 2011. Jomshof disputed rumours that this was due to his involvement with the Sweden Democrats and said the group split for personal reasons. In a 2013 interview with Side-Line, he spoke about his involvement in SD and what effect it has had on Elegant Machinery. When asked what he thought had improved in Sweden the latest 20 years in a 2020 interview, he said it was the music.

== Political career ==
Jomshof's original political background was in the Moderate Youth League, and he had also previously voted for the Swedish Social Democratic Party. He first became active in SD in the late 1990s. During the 2009 European Parliament election, Jomshof stood on the SD's list but was not elected. Since the 2010 Swedish general election, Jomshof represents the Gävleborg constituency in the Riksdag. He was also responsible for drafting the SD's education policies in the party manifesto ahead of the 2010 election.

In 2012, he succeeded Kent Ekeroth as SD's spokesman on legal affairs, and in January 2015 he was elected as party secretary, succeeding Björn Söder. In 2021, he was appointed the SD's spokesman on education policy.

Following the 2022 Swedish general election, Jomshof was appointed chairman of the Justice Committee in the Riksdag. In September 2024, he temporarily stepped down as chair of the Justice Committee after Swedish police announced an investigation into whether Jomshof republishing two image posts on X – from an account run by Indian satirist Imtiaz Mahmood which depicted caricatures of Muslim and Pakistani refugees as villains – constituted a hate crime following complaints from members of the justice committee. The Social Democrats, Left Party, Centre Party and Green Party all demanded Jomshof's resignation from the post. In his defense, Jomshof said that he had tweeted the cartoons as satire rather than to provoke hate. Jomshof was later reinstated as chairman of the justice committee after the preliminary investigation was dropped. The prosecutor in charge of the investigation – Joakim Zander – said the cartoons were not an "incitement against an ethnic group".

In February 2025, Jomshof announced he would step down as chairman of the Justice Committee after citing his personal opposition to new restrictions on AR-15 rifles introduced by the Swedish government following the 2025 Risbergska school shooting. The Sweden Democrat leadership announced the party would vote in favour of new laws favouring restrictions on semi-automatic weapon ownership whereas Jomshof and other leading SD parliamentarians said they were opposed to the new restrictions citing the impact it could have on hunters and farmers. He was replaced by Henrik Vinge.

== Political beliefs ==
=== Personal beliefs ===
Jomshof has cited Winston Churchill, Carl Gustaf Emil Mannerheim, Per Albin Hansson and the Dalai Lama as his political role models. He has stated that his most important issues in politics are harsher punishments for serious crimes, more restrictions on immigration, expanding nuclear power, reforms to Sweden's education system, an exit from the EU and creating a Nordic defense alliance. He is also an atheist.

=== Domestic politics ===
Jomshof has served as the SD's policy spokesman on school policies. He has called for teachers to take on non-pedagogical tasks while increasing the number of nurses and mental health councilors working with schools. He also believes Swedish should remain the official language within the state school system. Jomshof also said that he previously was a political liberal and supported open borders, but much of his current beliefs and decision to join the SD were formed after working in Swedish schools in the late 1980s and stating that he was already witnessing issues surrounding discipline, language and cultural segregation between immigrants and Swedes. Jomshof has called for a more restrictive immigration policy.

=== Foreign policy ===
Jomshof is a supporter of Israeli politics and has visited the country and posed with the Israeli flag on several occasions. On 31 October 2023, he wished IDF "good hunting" in its war against Hamas, which sparked criticism in Swedish media.

=== Opinions on Islam ===
Jomshof has received media attention for his statements about Islam and Muslim immigration to Sweden and has been accused of Islamophobia by political opponents, but has claimed he is not opposed to immigrants.

During a speech in the Swedish parliament in 2013, Jomshof said that Islam, unlike Christianity, is immoral and violent. During the same speech he compared Islam to Nazism and claimed that they both have no place in Western society. In 2021, Jomshof appeared on a Swedish TV show Sverige möts, where he allegedly called Islam a "disgusting religion." His remarks drew media attention and he was subsequently criticized by Moderate leader Ulf Kristersson and former Swedish prime minister Stefan Löfven. Jomshof later stated that his comments had been misinterpreted and taken out of context. In 2023, in response to a call by the Muslim Association of Sweden for dialogue over the 2023 Quran burnings in Sweden, Jomshof controversially tweeted that there was a need for dialogue over "how we democratise the Muslim world," calling Islam an "antidemocratic, violence-promoting and misogynistic religion/ideology" and calling Muhammad a "warlord, mass-murderer, slave trader and bandit."

In January 2024, Jomshof ignited controversy in Sweden by proposing the prohibition of the Islamic star and crescent. He drew parallels to the ban on the Swastika, claiming that both symbols represent something dangerous.

=== Opinions on other politicians ===
Jomshof was involved in a controversial polemic against MP Daniel Riazat of the (Left Party) in 2024. The incident started when Riazat stated that he did not want an apartment allocated to Riksdag members in the same building as SD politician Mattias Karlsson and referred to the SD as "Nazis" on Twitter. At the time, Riazat had also come under criticism from Moderate Party parliamentarian Fredrik Kärrholm for refusing to shake hands with opposition politicians following a Riksdag debate, which is often the custom. Jomshof responded by stating "Daniel Riazat thus wanted to move away from Mattias Karlsson. Personally, I think he should move from Sweden" and called him "a disgrace to the Iranian diaspora." Riazat responded by saying Jomshof's comments led to a wave of racist insults against him on social media.

== Sources ==
- BBC news with Jomshof's comments on how a member of the Swedish government shut down the SD Courier web site
- Elegant Machinery band members biography at elegantmachinery.de
- Article in Swedish newspaper Sydsvenskan about Jomshof losing his work because of his political views
