= Lorena Delgado Varas =

Swedish politician (born 1974)

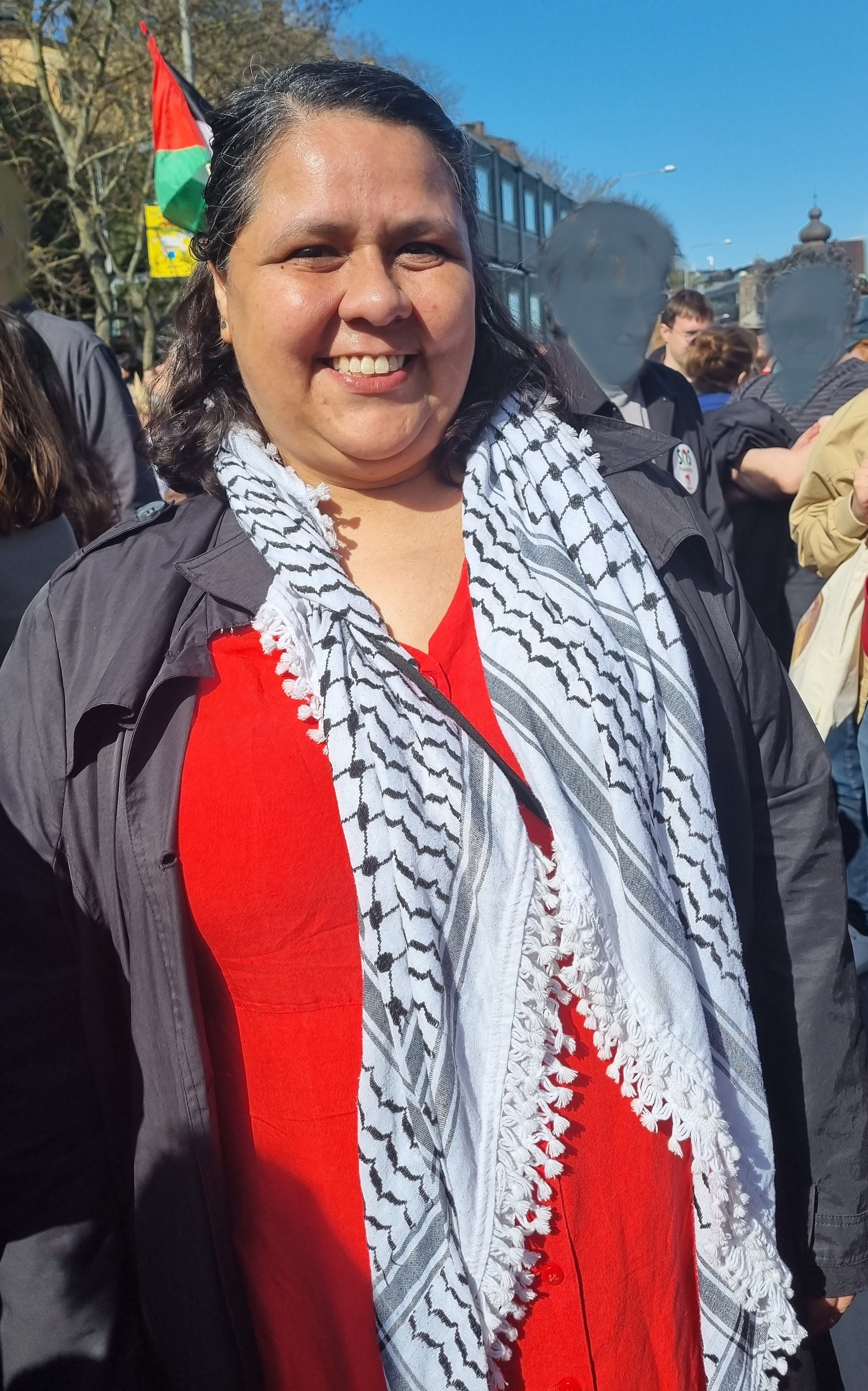
- Delgado Varas in May 2024

Member of the Riksdag
- Incumbent
- Assumed office 24 September 2018
- Constituency: Stockholm Municipality

Personal details
- Born: Lorena Olivia Delgado Varas; 1974 (age 51–52)
- Party: Future Left (since 2025)
- Other political affiliations: Left Party (until 2025)
- Education: KTH Royal Institute of Technology

Lorena Olivia Delgado Varas (born 1974) is a Swedish politician and member of the Riksdag. Formerly a member of the Left Party, she has represented Stockholm Municipality since September 2018.

== Early life and education ==
Delgado Varas is the daughter of mechanical engineer Daniel Delgado and preschool teacher Olivia Varas Acosta. She was educated in Temuco in Chile and studied chemical engineering at KTH Royal Institute of Technology. She was quality assistant at Fresenius Kabi in 2010 and has been a quality engineer at AstraZeneca since 2011.

== Political career ==
Delgado Varas began her political career as a member of the municipal council in Stockholm Municipality between 2014 and 2018. In the 2018 Swedish general election, she was elected to the Riksdag, Sweden's parliament and national legislature, in the Stockholm Municipality constituency. She was re-elected in the 2022 Swedish general election. Delgado Varas was excluded by the Left Party's parliamentary group in 2025 after she shared an allegedly antisemitic picture and refused to resign as Member of the Riksdag, and instead resigned as a member of the party. Her resignation coincided with the exclusion of Daniel Riazat.
