= Jamal El-Haj (politician) =

Swedish politician (born 1960)

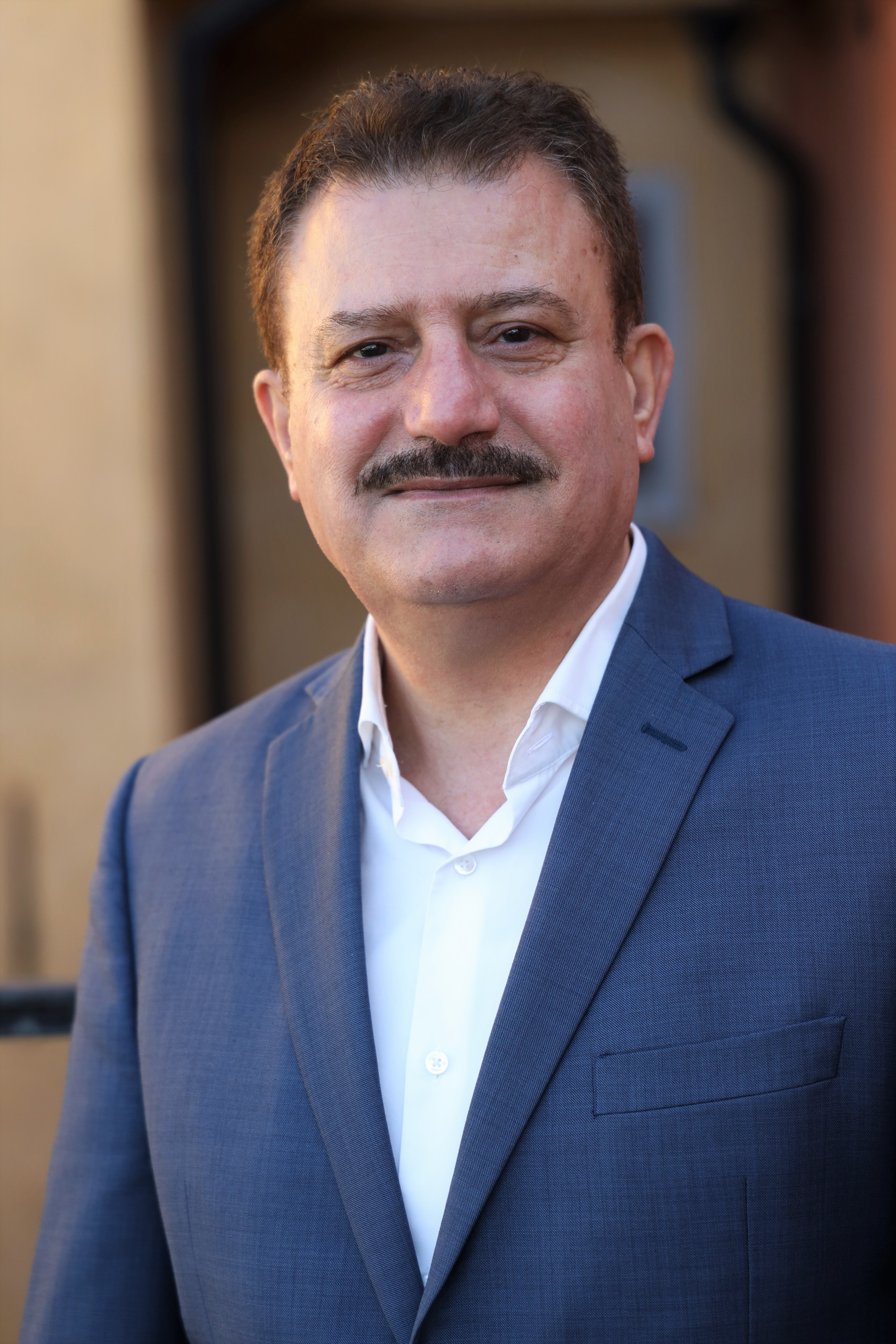
- El-Haj in March 2021

Member of the Riksdag
- In office 24 September 2018 – 28 september 2026
- Constituency: Malmö Municipality

Personal details
- Born: Jamal El-Haj; 1960 (age 65–66)
- Party: Unity Party
- Education: Lebanese University

Jamal El-Haj (Arabic: جَمَال الْحَاجّ; born 1960) is a Swedish politician, trade unionist and former member of the Riksdag. A former member of the Social Democratic Party, he represented Malmö Municipality between September 2018 and September 2026. He had previously been a substitute member of the Riksdag for Leif Jakobsson between June 2016 and September 2018.

El-Haj was educated in Tripoli, Lebanon and has a degree in sociology from the Lebanese University. He has held various roles at the IF Metall trade union. He was a member of the municipal council in Malmö Municipality from 2002 to 2014.

== Alleged links to Hamas ==
In March 2023, El-Haj attended a conference hosted by the European Palestinians Conference, seen together with a known activist for the Islamist movement Hamas, Amin Abu Rashid, who was later arrested for financing terrorism linked to the organization. A number of Swedish politicians immediately demanded his resignation. In May 2023, it was announced that El-Haj had been temporarily dismissed from his position in the Swedish parliament.

After the Hamas-led October 7 attacks, Jamal El-Haj was approached by Swedish media for a comment. El-Haj chose not to participate in the interview. This decision was interpreted in various ways. After having received widespread criticism from both Riksdag members and various media platforms, he later publicly affirmed his decision to distance himself from Hamas.

== Corruption scandal ==
On February 7, 2024, a leaked document revealed El-Haj's attempt to leverage his Riksdag position to influence the Swedish Migration Agency concerning the asylum application of a controversial Muslim religious leader. Additionally, it came to light that he had requested the agency to conceal his efforts to sway the decision. As a result of widespread criticism among the Swedish public, the Social Democrats declared on 9 February 2024 that they had lost confidence in El-Haj and asked him to resign. He subsequently left the party, but retained his seat in the Riksdag as an independent MP.

== Unity Party ==
In July–August 2025, El-Haj founded the Unity Party, which describes itself as pro-immigration.
