= Simona Mohamsson =

Swedish politician (born 1994)

- Mohamsson in 2026

Minister for Education
- Incumbent
- Assumed office 28 June 2025
- Monarch: Carl XVI Gustaf
- Prime Minister: Ulf Kristersson
- Preceded by: Johan Pehrson

Minister for Integration
- Incumbent
- Assumed office 28 June 2025
- Monarch: Carl XVI Gustaf
- Prime Minister: Ulf Kristersson
- Preceded by: Mats Persson

Leader of the Liberals
- Incumbent
- Assumed office 24 June 2025
- Preceded by: Johan Pehrson

Member of the Riksdag
- Incumbent
- Assumed office 28 September 2026
- Constituency: Gothenburg Municipality

Secretary of the Liberals
- In office 4 April 2025 – 24 June 2025
- Preceded by: Jakob Olofsgård
- Succeeded by: Fredrik Brange

Member of the Hisingen Municipal Council
- In office 2020 – December 2024

Personal details
- Born: Simona Mohammed; 27 December 1994 (age 31) Hamburg, Germany
- Citizenship: Sweden
- Party: Liberals (since 2010)
- Education: University of Gothenburg

Simona Mohamsson (born 27 December 1994) is a Swedish politician serving as Minister for Education and Minister for Integration in the Kristersson cabinet since 2025. She has been the leader of the Liberals since 24 June 2025.

== Biography ==
Mohamsson was born in Hamburg, Germany; her father is a Palestinian (born in Haifa, Israel) and her mother is a Lebanese Shia Muslim (born in Tripoli). The family moved from Hamburg to Sweden when she was eight, upon doing which they changed their last name from Mohammed to Mohamsson. She has stated that she is an atheist. She has studied at Göteborg University.

She has been vice-chairman of the Liberal Youth of Sweden (LUF). Mohamsson published the book Hongkong RIP in 2021, about the democracy movement in Hong Kong. She has previously supported giving military and economic help to Ukraine. She also profiled herself as an opponent of the far-right and promised that she would never let the Sweden Democrats participate in a government comprising the Liberals.

On 13 March 2026, she announced that the Liberals would allow the Sweden Democrats to participate in a future government. The announcement came at a joint press conference where she publicly embraced SD leader Jimmie Åkesson, symbolizing the agreement. This marked a major shift from the Liberals' previous opposition to SD ministers and sparked criticism within the party and among its voters. This announcement led to much criticism, with several prominent Liberals leaving the party. Subsequently, there were calls for Mohamsson to resign, whereupon Liberal ministers claimed they would resign if she had to resign.

In August 2026, Mohamsson wore a Star of David necklace during a televised debate, in order to draw attention to, and take a stance against, rising antisemitism in Sweden, saying that she wore it for children who did not dare to do so themselves in a solidarity act with Swedish Jews. The gesture sparked controversy and prompted hostile reactions on social media.

Party political offices
Preceded by Johan Pehrson	Leader of the Liberals; 2025–	Incumbent
Political offices
Preceded by Johan Pehrson	Minister for Education; 2025–	Incumbent
Preceded by Mats Persson	Minister for Integration; 2025–	Incumbent
