= Nooshi Dadgostar =

Swedish politician (born 1985)

- Dadgostar in 2026

Leader of the Left Party
- Incumbent
- Assumed office 31 October 2020
- Preceded by: Jonas Sjöstedt

Member of the Riksdag
- Incumbent
- Assumed office 30 September 2014
- Constituency: Stockholm County

Personal details
- Born: Mehrnoosh Dadgostar; 20 June 1985 (age 41) Ängelholm, Sweden
- Party: Left Party
- Domestic partner: Martin Westergren (2015–present)
- Children: 1
- Education: Stockholm University (attended)

Mehrnoosh "Nooshi" Dadgostar (born 20 June 1985) is a Swedish politician, a member of the Riksdag since 2014, deputy chair of the Left Party from 2018 to 2020, and the chair since October 2020.

== Early life and education ==
Mehrnoosh Dadgostar was born 20 June 1985 in Ängelholm, Skåne. Her parents moved to Sweden as refugees from Iran to escape persecution in the early 1980s, arriving to live in an asylum centre. She grew up in Gothenburg and attended Schillerska gymnasiet. She became involved in the Young Left in 1999, at age 14. From 2004 to 2006 Dadgostar worked as a care assistant for the City of Gothenburg.

Dadgostar enrolled at Stockholm University in 2009 to study law, but did not complete a degree.

== Political career ==
She served as deputy chairperson of the Young Left and a member of the municipal council of Botkyrka.

She was elected to the Riksdag (Swedish parliament) in 2014 for Stockholm County, and in 2018 became deputy chairperson of the Left Party.

On 3 February 2020, Dadgostar announced that she would be running for leader of her party following the resignation of Jonas Sjöstedt. In late September 2020, Dadgostar was officially nominated as the party's new leader, and on 31 October she was elected leader of the Left Party.

In mid-June 2021, she threatened to seek a vote of no-confidence in Stefan Löfven's premiership after the government announced its intention to relax rent control laws in Sweden. On 15 June, she issued a 48-hour ultimatum to the government to either withdraw its plans or have the Left Party withdraw from the governing coalition. Dadgostar followed through, resulting in a chamber vote where the Riksdag voted Löfven out of power (see 2021 Swedish government crisis).

== Personal life ==
Dadgostar has been in a relationship with philosopher Martin Westergren since 2015, with whom she has one daughter. The family lives in Stockholm.

Party political offices
Preceded by Jonas Sjöstedt	Leader of the Left Party; 2020–present	Incumbent
