= Malmö Municipality (Riksdag constituency) =

Constituency of the Riksdag, the national legislature of Sweden

- Malmö Kommun
- Constituency for the Riksdag
- Location of Malmö Municipality within Sweden
- Municipality: Malmö
- County: Skåne
- Population: 367,924 (2025)
- Electorate: 268,096 (2026)
- Area: 159 km^{2} (2026)

Current constituency
- Created: 1994
- Seats: List (Note: Constituency seats only.): 10 (2014–present); 9 (1998–2014); 8 (1994–1998)
- Member of the Riksdag: List: Zinaida Kajevic (S); Lars Leijonborg (L); Anfal Mahdi (V); Banesa Martinez Roldan (V); Bassem Nasr (MP); Peter Ollén (M); Niels Paarup-Petersen (C); Tony Rahm (M); Patrick Reslow (SD); Joakim Sandell (S); Arwin Sohrabi (S)
- Created from: Fyrstadskretsen

Malmö Municipality (Swedish: Malmö Kommun) is one of the 29 multi-member constituencies of the Riksdag, the national legislature of Sweden. The constituency was established in 1994 from parts of Fyrstadskretsen following the reorganisation of the constituencies in Malmöhus County. It is conterminous with the municipality of Malmö. The constituency currently elects 10 of the 349 members of the Riksdag using the open party-list proportional representation electoral system. At the 2026 general election it had 268,096 registered electors.

== Electoral system ==
Malmö Municipality currently elects 10 of the 349 members of the Riksdag using the open party-list proportional representation electoral system. Constituency seats are allocated using the modified Sainte-Laguë method. Only parties that reach the 4% national threshold and parties that receive at least 12% of the vote in the constituency compete for constituency seats. Supplementary levelling seats may also be allocated at the constituency level to parties that reach the 4% national threshold.

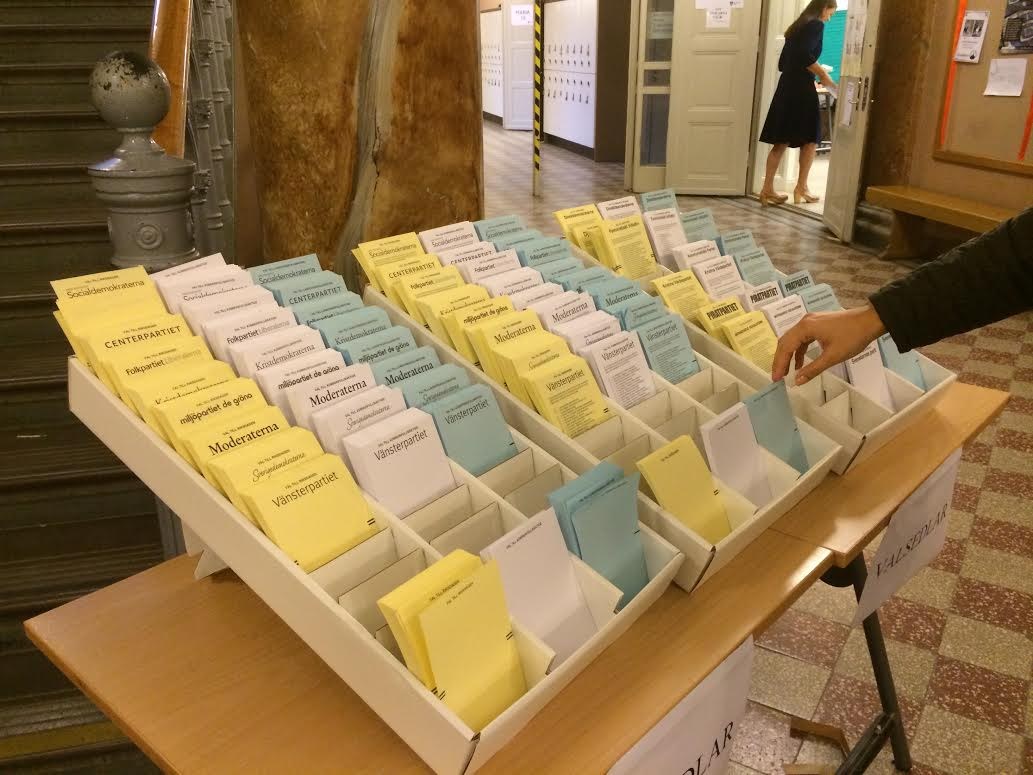
A selection of ballot papers available for voters at the 2014 general election in Stockholm - yellow for the Riksdag, blue for the regional council and white for the municipal council

Prior to 1997 voters could cast any ballot paper they wanted, though it had to contain the name of a party and the name of at least one candidate nominated by that party in the constituency. It was common for parties to hand out ballot papers with their name and list of candidates at the entrance of polling stations. Voters could delete the names of candidates or write-in the names of other candidates but in practice these options weren't used enough by voters to have any significant impact on the results and consequently elections operated as a closed system.

Since 1997, elections in Sweden follow the French model in having separate ballot papers for each party/list in a constituency. There are two ballot papers for each party - a party ballot paper (partivalsedel) with just the name of the party and a name ballot paper (namnvalsedel) with the name of the party and its list of candidates. There are also blank ballot papers (blank valsedel). Voters can initially pick as many ballot papers as they wish and then, in the secrecy of the voting booth, they select a single ballot paper of their choice. If they chose a name ballot paper they have the option of casting a preferential vote for one of their chosen party's candidates. If they chose a blank ballot paper they can write the name of any party including unregistered parties and, optionally, they can write the name of any person as their preferred candidate, even one that does not belong to their chosen party. They then place their chosen ballot paper in an envelope which is placed in the ballot box, discarding all other ballot papers they picked.

Seats won by each party/list in a constituency are allocated to its candidates in order of preference votes (a personal mandate), provided that the candidate has received at least 8% of votes cast for their party in the constituency (5% since January 2011). Any unfilled seats are then allocated to the party's remaining candidates in the order they appear on the party list (a party mandate).

== Election results ==
=== Summary ===
Election	Left V / VPK			Social Democrats S			Greens MP			Centre C			Liberals L / FP / F			Moderates M			Christian Democrats KD / KDS			Sweden Democrats SD		
Election	Votes	%	Seats	Votes	%	Seats	Votes	%	Seats	Votes	%	Seats	Votes	%	Seats	Votes	%	Seats	Votes	%	Seats	Votes	%	Seats
2026	36,572	17.17%	2	61,724	28.98%	3	19,754	9.28%	1	12,475	5.86%	1	9,820	4.61%	0	35,076	16.47%	2	6,927	3.25%	0	28,110	13.20%	1
2022	23,986	12.49%	1	56,789	29.57%	3	14,386	7.49%	1	10,546	5.49%	1	8,706	4.53%	0	34,313	17.87%	2	5,753	3.00%	0	31,433	16.37%	2
2018	23,021	11.91%	1	56,248	29.10%	3	10,783	5.58%	0	11,003	5.69%	1	10,812	5.59%	1	37,645	19.48%	2	7,426	3.84%	0	32,480	16.80%	2
2014	13,598	7.59%	1	52,460	29.29%	3	15,367	8.58%	1	4,850	2.71%	0	10,000	5.58%	0	41,510	23.18%	3	4,620	2.58%	0	24,171	13.50%	2
2010	10,118	5.98%	0	48,450	28.65%	3	14,861	8.79%	1	4,795	2.84%	0	11,768	6.96%	1	55,160	32.62%	3	5,274	3.12%	0	13,256	7.84%	1
2006	8,468	5.45%	0	54,732	35.24%	4	9,425	6.07%	1	4,475	2.88%	0	13,769	8.87%	1	44,232	28.48%	3	5,373	3.46%	0	7,708	4.96%	0
2002	11,172	7.59%	1	62,338	42.37%	5	6,310	4.29%	0	1,701	1.16%	0	20,322	13.81%	1	24,235	16.47%	2	7,793	5.30%	0	5,538	3.76%	0
1998	12,071	8.58%	1	58,979	41.94%	4	4,989	3.55%	0	1,498	1.07%	0	4,988	3.55%	0	38,930	27.68%	3	10,752	7.65%	1			
1994	6,513	4.45%	0	71,442	48.76%	5	5,364	3.66%	0	2,933	2.00%	0	8,350	5.70%	0	40,454	27.61%	3	3,621	2.47%	0			

(Excludes levelling seats. Figures in italics represent alliances/joint lists.)

=== Detailed ===
Party has received at least 4% of the vote nationally and is entitled to compete for constituency seats.

==== 2020s ====
===== 2026 =====
Results of the 2026 general election held on 13 September 2026:

Party		Votes per municipal electoral district		Total votes	%	Seats		
Party		Östra	Västra	Total votes	%	Con.	Lev.	Tot.
Swedish Social Democratic Party	S	33,823	27,901	61,724	28.98%	3	0	3
Left Party	V	20,302	16,270	36,572	17.17%	2	0	2
Moderate Party	M	14,630	20,446	35,076	16.47%	2	0	2
Sweden Democrats	SD	13,294	14,816	28,110	13.20%	1	0	1
Green Party	MP	8,710	11,044	19,754	9.28%	1	0	1
Centre Party	C	5,100	7,375	12,475	5.86%	1	0	1
Liberals	L	3,858	5,962	9,820	4.61%	0	1	1
Christian Democrats	KD	2,698	4,229	6,927	3.25%	0	0	0
Örebro Party	ÖP	299	325	624	0.29%	0	0	0
Alternative for Sweden	AfS	287	326	613	0.29%	0	0	0
Pirate Party	PP	170	125	295	0.14%	0	0	0
Ambition Sweden	AS	87	78	165	0.08%	0	0	0
Communist Party of Sweden	SKP	65	79	144	0.07%	0	0	0
Christian Values Party	KrVP	54	65	119	0.06%	0	0	0
Human Rights and Democracy	MoD	46	56	102	0.05%	0	0	0
United Voice	ER	51	47	98	0.05%	0	0	0
Citizens' Coalition	MED	44	40	84	0.04%	0	0	0
Nuance Party	PNy	52	22	74	0.03%	0	0	0
Security Party	TRP	19	17	36	0.02%	0	0	0
Sweden's National Democratic Party	SNDP	19	13	32	0.02%	0	0	0
Direct Democrats	DD	10	16	26	0.01%	0	0	0
Anti-Authoritarian Action Party		6	12	18	0.01%	0	0	0
Turning Point Party	PV	3	6	9	0.00%	0	0	0
Independent Rural Party	LPo	3	4	7	0.00%	0	0	0
Unity	ENH	4	3	7	0.00%	0	0	0
Volt Sweden	Volt	5	2	7	0.00%	0	0	0
A Good Sweden		5	0	5	0.00%	0	0	0
Donald Duck Party		2	3	5	0.00%	0	0	0
Vision Party		4	1	5	0.00%	0	0	0
AI Party		1	3	4	0.00%	0	0	0
Classical Liberal Party	KLP	0	4	4	0.00%	0	0	0
Evelina's Party		0	4	4	0.00%	0	0	0
Communist Party	K	1	2	3	0.00%	0	0	0
The Push Buttons	Kn	2	1	3	0.00%	0	0	0
RegleraAI.nu		1	1	2	0.00%	0	0	0
Animal Lovers' Party		1	0	1	0.00%	0	0	0
Architecture Uprising Party		0	1	1	0.00%	0	0	0
For the Good of All		0	1	1	0.00%	0	0	0
Free Party		0	1	1	0.00%	0	0	0
Jesus		0	1	1	0.00%	0	0	0
New Allance		1	0	1	0.00%	0	0	0
Nordic Resistance Movement	NMR	0	1	1	0.00%	0	0	0
Peace Team		0	1	1	0.00%	0	0	0
People's List		0	1	1	0.00%	0	0	0
Proxy Party		1	0	1	0.00%	0	0	0
Secular Humanist Party		0	1	1	0.00%	0	0	0
Star Party Sweden		0	1	1	0.00%	0	0	0
Valid votes		103,658	109,307	212,965	100.00%	10	1	11
Blank votes		785	803	1,588	0.74%			
Rejected votes – unregistered parties		28	24	52	0.02%			
Rejected votes – other		93	104	197	0.09%			
Total polled		104,564	110,238	214,802	80.12%			
Registered electors		135,435	132,661	268,096				
Turnout		77.21%	83.10%	80.12%				

The following candidates were elected:

- Constituency seats (personal mandates) - Anfal Mahdi (V), 2,960 votes; Noria Manouchi (M), 1,788 votes; Banesa Martinez Roldan (V), 1,871 votes; Bassem Nasr (MP), 1,163 votes; Niels Paarup-Petersen (C), 1,328 votes; and Joakim Sandell (S), 4,135 votes.
- Constituency seats (party mandates) - Rose-Marie Carlsson (S), 1,396 votes; Peter Ollén (M), 791 votes; Patrick Reslow (SD), 90 votes; and Arwin Sohrabi (S), 202 votes.
- Levelling seats (party mandates) - Lars Leijonborg (L), 31 votes.

===== 2022 =====
Results of the 2022 general election held on 11 September 2022:

Party		Votes per municipal electoral district		Total votes	%	Seats		
Party		Östra	Västra	Total votes	%	Con.	Lev.	Tot.
Swedish Social Democratic Party	S	30,114	26,675	56,789	29.57%	3	0	3
Moderate Party	M	14,837	19,476	34,313	17.87%	2	0	2
Sweden Democrats	SD	15,016	16,417	31,433	16.37%	2	0	2
Left Party	V	11,764	12,222	23,986	12.49%	1	0	1
Green Party	MP	6,715	7,671	14,386	7.49%	1	0	1
Centre Party	C	4,759	5,787	10,546	5.49%	1	0	1
Liberals	L	3,511	5,195	8,706	4.53%	0	1	1
Christian Democrats	KD	2,456	3,297	5,753	3.00%	0	0	0
Nuance Party	PNy	2,971	1,058	4,029	2.10%	0	0	0
Citizens' Coalition	MED	204	179	383	0.20%	0	0	0
Alternative for Sweden	AfS	172	186	358	0.19%	0	0	0
Pirate Party	PP	186	160	346	0.18%	0	0	0
Scania Party	SKÅ	94	68	162	0.08%	0	0	0
Human Rights and Democracy	MoD	68	83	151	0.08%	0	0	0
Feminist Initiative	FI	65	76	141	0.07%	0	0	0
The Push Buttons	Kn	59	48	107	0.06%	0	0	0
Communist Party of Sweden	SKP	46	32	78	0.04%	0	0	0
Climate Alliance	KA	32	43	75	0.04%	0	0	0
Security Party	TRP	31	28	59	0.03%	0	0	0
Christian Values Party	KrVP	27	21	48	0.02%	0	0	0
Direct Democrats	DD	20	23	43	0.02%	0	0	0
Unity	ENH	12	25	37	0.02%	0	0	0
Basic Income Party	BASIP	8	9	17	0.01%	0	0	0
Socialist Welfare Party	S-V	4	11	15	0.01%	0	0	0
Hard Line Sweden		9	4	13	0.01%	0	0	0
Turning Point Party	PV	5	8	13	0.01%	0	0	0
Classical Liberal Party	KLP	8	3	11	0.01%	0	0	0
Nordic Resistance Movement	NMR	8	2	10	0.01%	0	0	0
Donald Duck Party		5	3	8	0.00%	0	0	0
Independent Rural Party	LPo	2	4	6	0.00%	0	0	0
Volt Sweden	Volt	1	3	4	0.00%	0	0	0
Common Sense in Sweden	CSIS	0	2	2	0.00%	0	0	0
National Law of Sweden		1	1	2	0.00%	0	0	0
Change Party Revolution		0	1	1	0.00%	0	0	0
Electoral Cooperation Party		1	0	1	0.00%	0	0	0
Evil Chicken Party	OKP	1	0	1	0.00%	0	0	0
Freedom Party		1	0	1	0.00%	0	0	0
John Mikkonen		1	0	1	0.00%	0	0	0
Love		0	1	1	0.00%	0	0	0
My Sweden		1	0	1	0.00%	0	0	0
My Voice		1	0	1	0.00%	0	0	0
Pax		1	0	1	0.00%	0	0	0
Political Shift		0	1	1	0.00%	0	0	0
Sweden Party		1	0	1	0.00%	0	0	0
The Monists		0	1	1	0.00%	0	0	0
United Democratic Party		1	0	1	0.00%	0	0	0
Valid votes		93,219	98,824	192,043	100.00%	10	1	11
Blank votes		854	833	1,687	0.87%			
Rejected votes – unregistered parties		24	12	36	0.02%			
Rejected votes – other		109	83	192	0.10%			
Total polled		94,206	99,752	193,958	77.22%			
Registered electors				251,172				
Turnout				77.22%				

The following candidates were elected:

- Constituency seats (personal mandates) - Malcolm Jallow (V), 1,840 votes; Noria Manouchi (M), 1,819 votes; and Joakim Sandell (S), 3,047 votes.
- Constituency seats (party mandates) - Rose-Marie Carlsson (S), 639 votes; Jamal El-Haj (S), 1,417 votes; Nima Gholam Ali Pour (SD), 44 votes; Rasmus Ling (MP), 383 votes; Peter Ollén (M), 360 votes; Niels Paarup-Petersen (C), 318 votes; and Patrick Reslow (SD), 90 votes.
- Levelling seats (party mandates) - Louise Eklund (L), 398 votes.

Permanent substitutions:

- Rasmus Ling (MP) resigned on 9 February 2025 and was replaced by Malte Tängmark Roos (MP) on 10 February 2025.

==== 2010s ====
===== 2018 =====
Results of the 2018 general election held on 9 September 2018:

Party		Votes per municipal electoral district		Total votes	%	Seats		
Party		Östra	Västra	Total votes	%	Con.	Lev.	Tot.
Swedish Social Democratic Party	S	32,380	23,868	56,248	29.10%	3	0	3
Moderate Party	M	16,201	21,444	37,645	19.48%	2	0	2
Sweden Democrats	SD	15,915	16,565	32,480	16.80%	2	0	2
Left Party	V	10,921	12,100	23,021	11.91%	1	0	1
Centre Party	C	4,852	6,151	11,003	5.69%	1	0	1
Liberals	L	4,451	6,361	10,812	5.59%	1	0	1
Green Party	MP	5,045	5,738	10,783	5.58%	0	1	1
Christian Democrats	KD	2,914	4,512	7,426	3.84%	0	0	0
Feminist Initiative	FI	694	817	1,511	0.78%	0	0	0
Alternative for Sweden	AfS	278	251	529	0.27%	0	0	0
Citizens' Coalition	MED	207	207	414	0.21%	0	0	0
Pirate Party	PP	172	184	356	0.18%	0	0	0
Scania Party	SKÅ	118	126	244	0.13%	0	0	0
Animal Party	DjuP	80	69	149	0.08%	0	0	0
Unity	ENH	55	78	133	0.07%	0	0	0
Direct Democrats	DD	60	70	130	0.07%	0	0	0
Security Party	TRP	56	67	123	0.06%	0	0	0
Communist Party of Sweden	SKP	57	30	87	0.05%	0	0	0
Christian Values Party	KrVP	21	35	56	0.03%	0	0	0
Classical Liberal Party	KLP	19	26	45	0.02%	0	0	0
Initiative	INI	12	21	33	0.02%	0	0	0
Nordic Resistance Movement	NMR	18	11	29	0.02%	0	0	0
Basic Income Party	BASIP	9	13	22	0.01%	0	0	0
Independent Rural Party	LPo	1	5	6	0.00%	0	0	0
European Workers Party	EAP	3	0	3	0.00%	0	0	0
Gula Party	Gup	0	1	1	0.00%	0	0	0
Parties not on the ballot		7	2	9	0.00%	0	0	0
Valid votes		94,546	98,752	193,298	100.00%	10	1	11
Blank votes		718	705	1,423	0.73%			
Rejected votes – unregistered parties		50	30	80	0.04%			
Rejected votes – other		72	58	130	0.07%			
Total polled		95,386	99,545	194,931	82.01%			
Registered electors		121,019	116,672	237,691				
Turnout		78.82%	85.32%	82.01%				

The following candidates were elected:

- Constituency seats (personal mandates) - Tobias Billström (M), 2,774 votes; Jamal El-Haj (S), 3,360 votes; and Malcolm Jallow (V), 1,560 votes.
- Constituency seats (party mandates) - Hillevi Larsson (S), 1,607 votes; Noria Manouchi (M), 505 votes; Niels Paarup-Petersen (C), 222 votes; Per Ramhorn (SD), 95 votes; Joakim Sandell (S), 2,198 votes; Sara Seppälä (SD), 3 votes; and Allan Widman (L), 448 votes.
- Levelling seats (party mandates) - Rasmus Ling (MP), 298 votes.

===== 2014 =====
Results of the 2014 general election held on 14 September 2014:

Party		Votes per municipal electoral district		Total votes	%	Seats		
Party		Östra	Västra	Total votes	%	Con.	Lev.	Tot.
Swedish Social Democratic Party	S	30,415	22,045	52,460	29.29%	3	0	3
Moderate Party	M	17,595	23,915	41,510	23.18%	3	0	3
Sweden Democrats	SD	12,190	11,981	24,171	13.50%	2	0	2
Green Party	MP	7,295	8,072	15,367	8.58%	1	0	1
Left Party	V	6,876	6,722	13,598	7.59%	1	0	1
Liberal People's Party	FP	4,098	5,902	10,000	5.58%	0	1	1
Feminist Initiative	FI	4,352	5,647	9,999	5.58%	0	0	0
Centre Party	C	2,043	2,807	4,850	2.71%	0	0	0
Christian Democrats	KD	1,746	2,874	4,620	2.58%	0	0	0
Pirate Party	PP	484	369	853	0.48%	0	0	0
Swedish Senior Citizen Interest Party	SPI	355	480	835	0.47%	0	0	0
Animal Party	DjuP	83	79	162	0.09%	0	0	0
Unity	ENH	68	84	152	0.08%	0	0	0
Christian Values Party	KrVP	47	55	102	0.06%	0	0	0
Party of the Swedes	SVP	38	56	94	0.05%	0	0	0
Communist Party of Sweden	SKP	48	24	72	0.04%	0	0	0
Direct Democrats	DD	22	28	50	0.03%	0	0	0
Classical Liberal Party	KLP	22	25	47	0.03%	0	0	0
Gula Party	Gup	19	16	35	0.02%	0	0	0
Scania Party	SKÅ	3	8	11	0.01%	0	0	0
Progressive Party		8	2	10	0.01%	0	0	0
Health Party		4	2	6	0.00%	0	0	0
Republicans		5	0	5	0.00%	0	0	0
Socialist Justice Party	RS	3	1	4	0.00%	0	0	0
European Workers Party	EAP	1	0	1	0.00%	0	0	0
Independent Rural Party	LPo	0	1	1	0.00%	0	0	0
Peace Democrats	FD	0	1	1	0.00%	0	0	0
Reformist Neutral Party	RNP	1	0	1	1.16%	0	0	0
Parties not on the ballot		43	43	86	0.05%	0	0	0
Valid votes		87,864	91,239	179,103	101.16%	10	1	11
Blank votes		757	792	1,549	0.86%			
Rejected votes – other		36	19	55	0.03%			
Total polled		88,657	92,050	180,707	79.73%			
Registered electors		115,613	111,038	226,651				
Turnout		76.68%	82.90%	79.73%				

The following candidates were elected:

- Constituency seats (personal mandates) - Daniel Sestrajcic (V), 1,058 votes.
- Constituency seats (party mandates) - Jennie Åfeldt (SD), 1 vote; Tobias Billström (M), 2,026 votes; Anders Forsberg (SD), 5 votes; Marie Granlund (S), 2,520 votes; Leif Jakobsson (S), 955 votes; Hillevi Larsson (S), 1,247 votes; Olof Lavesson (M), 409 votes; Rasmus Ling (MP), 569 votes; and Patrick Reslow (M), 711 votes.
- Levelling seats (personal mandates) - Allan Widman (FP), 635 votes.

Permanent substitutions:

- Anders Forsberg (SD) resigned on 1 June 2017 and was replaced by Heidi Karlsson (SD) on 2 June 2017.
- Daniel Sestrajcic (V) resigned on 31 August 2017 and was replaced by Malcolm Jallow (V) on the same day.

===== 2010 =====
Results of the 2010 general election held on 19 September 2010:

Party		Votes per municipal electoral district		Total votes	%	Seats		
Party		Östra	Västra	Total votes	%	Con.	Lev.	Tot.
Moderate Party	M	23,635	31,525	55,160	32.62%	3	0	3
Swedish Social Democratic Party	S	28,687	19,763	48,450	28.65%	3	0	3
Green Party	MP	6,800	8,061	14,861	8.79%	1	0	1
Sweden Democrats	SD	6,930	6,326	13,256	7.84%	1	0	1
Liberal People's Party	FP	5,050	6,718	11,768	6.96%	1	0	1
Left Party	V	4,871	5,247	10,118	5.98%	0	1	1
Christian Democrats	KD	1,967	3,307	5,274	3.12%	0	0	0
Centre Party	C	2,050	2,745	4,795	2.84%	0	0	0
Swedish Senior Citizen Interest Party	SPI	1,311	1,466	2,777	1.64%	0	0	0
Feminist Initiative	FI	505	754	1,259	0.74%	0	0	0
Pirate Party	PP	587	514	1,101	0.65%	0	0	0
Communist Party of Sweden	SKP	43	29	72	0.04%	0	0	0
Classical Liberal Party	KLP	16	22	38	0.02%	0	0	0
Sweden's National Democratic Party	SNDP	21	10	31	0.02%	0	0	0
Alliance Party/The Voice of the Citizen	ALP	22	5	27	0.02%	0	0	0
National Democrats	ND	10	6	16	0.01%	0	0	0
Freedom Party		7	6	13	0.01%	0	0	0
Party of the Swedes	SVP	3	6	9	0.01%	0	0	0
Unity	ENH	3	5	8	0.00%	0	0	0
Republicans		5	2	7	0.00%	0	0	0
Scania Party	SKÅ	2	5	7	0.00%	0	0	0
European Workers Party	EAP	3	3	6	0.00%	0	0	0
Active Democracy		2	2	4	0.00%	0	0	0
Communist League	KommF	0	4	4	0.00%	0	0	0
Spirits Party		4	0	4	0.00%	0	0	0
Health Care Party	Sjvåp	1	1	2	0.00%	0	0	0
Alexander's List	Alex	1	0	1	0.00%	0	0	0
Socialist Justice Party	RS	1	0	1	0.00%	0	0	0
Parties not on the ballot		22	17	39	0.02%	0	0	0
Valid votes		82,559	86,549	169,108	100.00%	9	1	10
Blank votes		723	779	1,502	0.88%			
Rejected votes – other		36	21	57	0.03%			
Total polled		83,318	87,349	170,667	79.63%			
Registered electors		108,266	106,060	214,326				
Turnout		76.96%	82.36%	79.63%				

The following candidates were elected:

- Constituency seats (personal mandates) - Maria Ferm (MP), 1,199 votes.
- Constituency seats (party mandates) - Tobias Billström (M), 3,801 votes; Josef Fransson (SD), 1 vote; Marie Granlund (S), 3,100 votes; Leif Jakobsson (S), 858 votes; Hillevi Larsson (S), 1,239 votes; Olof Lavesson (M), 554 votes; Patrick Reslow (M), 728 votes; and Allan Widman (FP), 702 votes.
- Levelling seats (party mandates) - Marianne Berg (V), 451 votes.

==== 2000s ====
===== 2006 =====
Results of the 2006 general election held on 17 September 2006:

Party		Votes per municipal electoral district		Total votes	%	Seats		
Party		Östra	Västra	Total votes	%	Con.	Lev.	Tot.
Swedish Social Democratic Party	S	30,409	24,323	54,732	35.24%	4	0	4
Moderate Party	M	18,234	25,998	44,232	28.48%	3	0	3
Liberal People's Party	FP	5,988	7,781	13,769	8.87%	1	0	1
Green Party	MP	4,632	4,793	9,425	6.07%	1	0	1
Left Party	V	4,357	4,111	8,468	5.45%	0	1	1
Sweden Democrats	SD	4,086	3,622	7,708	4.96%	0	0	0
Christian Democrats	KD	2,115	3,258	5,373	3.46%	0	0	0
Centre Party	C	2,098	2,377	4,475	2.88%	0	0	0
Swedish Senior Citizen Interest Party	SPI	1,579	1,917	3,496	2.25%	0	0	0
Feminist Initiative	FI	848	986	1,834	1.18%	0	0	0
Pirate Party	PP	509	442	951	0.61%	0	0	0
June List		186	184	370	0.24%	0	0	0
The Communists	KOMM	70	63	133	0.09%	0	0	0
Health Care Party	Sjvåp	32	56	88	0.06%	0	0	0
Unity	ENH	30	30	60	0.04%	0	0	0
Alliance Party	ALP	6	25	31	0.02%	0	0	0
Sweden's National Democratic Party	SNDP	18	13	31	0.02%	0	0	0
National Socialist Front		18	9	27	0.02%	0	0	0
National Democrats	ND	12	7	19	0.01%	0	0	0
Scania Party	SKÅ	4	7	11	0.01%	0	0	0
Classical Liberal Party	KLP	4	5	9	0.01%	0	0	0
Palmes Party		5	0	5	0.00%	0	0	0
Socialist Justice Party	RS	0	5	5	0.00%	0	0	0
Active Democracy		3	1	4	0.00%	0	0	0
Communist League	KommF	2	2	4	0.00%	0	0	0
People's Will		3	1	4	0.00%	0	0	0
Kvinnokraft		2	1	3	0.00%	0	0	0
New Future	NYF	1	2	3	0.00%	0	0	0
European Workers Party	EAP	0	2	2	0.00%	0	0	0
Partiet.se		2	0	2	0.00%	0	0	0
Republicans		2	0	2	0.00%	0	0	0
Unique Party		1	0	1	0.00%	0	0	0
Viking Party		0	1	1	0.00%	0	0	0
Other parties		13	11	24	0.02%	0	0	0
Valid votes		75,269	80,033	155,302	100.00%	9	1	10
Blank votes		1,177	1,139	2,316	1.47%			
Rejected votes – other		30	43	73	0.05%			
Total polled		76,476	81,215	157,691	77.56%			
Registered electors		101,692	101,616	203,308				
Turnout		75.20%	79.92%	77.56%				

The following candidates were elected:

- Constituency seats (party mandates) - Luciano Astudillo (S), 1,743 votes; Tobias Billström (M), 2,482 votes; Inge Garstedt (M), 899 votes; Marie Granlund (S), 3,061 votes; Leif Jakobsson (S), 1,156 votes; Hillevi Larsson (S), 799 votes; Olof Lavesson (M), 307 votes; Karin Svensson Smith (MP), 472 votes; and Allan Widman (FP), 742 votes.
- Levelling seats (party mandates) - Marianne Berg (V), 369 votes.

===== 2002 =====
Results of the 2002 general election held on 15 September 2002:

Party		Votes per municipal electoral district			Total votes	%	Seats		
Party		Östra	Västra	Not Counted	Total votes	%	Con.	Lev.	Tot.
Swedish Social Democratic Party	S	33,082	28,672	584	62,338	42.37%	5	0	5
Moderate Party	M	9,541	14,070	624	24,235	16.47%	2	0	2
Liberal People's Party	FP	8,437	11,543	342	20,322	13.81%	1	0	1
Left Party	V	5,673	5,280	219	11,172	7.59%	1	0	1
Christian Democrats	KD	3,031	4,630	132	7,793	5.30%	0	0	0
Green Party	MP	2,942	3,224	144	6,310	4.29%	0	0	0
Sweden Democrats	SD	2,723	2,790	25	5,538	3.76%	0	0	0
Swedish Senior Citizen Interest Party	SPI	1,978	2,527	30	4,535	3.08%	0	0	0
Scania Party	SKÅ	1,382	1,286	10	2,678	1.82%	0	0	0
Centre Party	C	818	847	36	1,701	1.16%	0	0	0
The Communists	KOMM	46	52	0	98	0.07%	0	0	0
Sweden's National Democratic Party	SNDP	45	36	0	81	0.06%	0	0	0
Socialist Party	SOC.P	20	7	1	28	0.02%	0	0	0
Scania Federalists		6	9	0	15	0.01%	0	0	0
Republicans		6	5	0	11	0.01%	0	0	0
Kalle Anka Party		4	3	3	10	0.01%	0	0	0
Unity	ENH	2	6	0	8	0.01%	0	0	0
Socialist Justice Party	RS	4	2	0	6	0.00%	0	0	0
Blank Votes Party		3	2	0	5	0.00%	0	0	0
Communist League	KommF	2	2	0	4	0.00%	0	0	0
New Future	NYF	0	4	0	4	0.00%	0	0	0
Pensions and Widow Pensions Party		4	0	0	4	0.00%	0	0	0
Alliance Party	ALP	2	1	0	3	0.00%	0	0	0
Animal Welfare Party		2	1	0	3	0.00%	0	0	0
Cloning No Thank You Party		1	2	0	3	0.00%	0	0	0
God, Troll, Witches, Being and Cosmic Forces Party		1	2	0	3	0.00%	0	0	0
European Workers Party	EAP	2	0	0	2	0.00%	0	0	0
Shaman's Individual Party		2	0	0	2	0.00%	0	0	0
The Dog Party		0	2	0	2	0.00%	0	0	0
Viking Party		1	1	0	2	0.00%	0	0	0
Football Party		1	0	0	1	0.00%	0	0	0
Santa Party		1	0	0	1	0.00%	0	0	0
Single Party		0	1	0	1	0.00%	0	0	0
The Cooked Frog Dance Party		1	0	0	1	0.00%	0	0	0
The Country We Inherited Party		1	0	0	1	0.00%	0	0	0
The Dentist High Cost Party		1	0	0	1	0.00%	0	0	0
Other parties		123	87	2	212	0.14%	0	0	0
Valid votes		69,888	75,094	2,152	147,134	100.00%	9	0	9
Rejected votes		1,135	1,066	49	2,250	1.51%			
Total polled		71,023	76,160	2,201	149,384	76.09%			
Registered electors		97,943	98,395		196,338				
Turnout		72.51%	77.40%		76.09%				

The following candidates were elected:

- Constituency seats (personal mandates) - Göran Persson (S), 17,444 votes.
- Constituency seats (party mandates) - Tobias Billström (M), 1,669 votes; Marie Granlund (S), 176 votes; Leif Jakobsson (S), 65 votes; Britt-Marie Lindkvist (S), 131 votes; Lars-Erik Lövdén (S), 143 votes; Sten Lundström (V), 655 votes; Carl-Axel Roslund (M), 1,199 votes; and Allan Widman (FP), 1,112 votes.

Permanent substitutions:

- Lars-Erik Lövdén (S) resigned on 31 October 2004 and was replaced by Hillevi Larsson (S) on 1 November 2004.

==== 1990s ====
===== 1998 =====
Results of the 1998 general election held on 20 September 1998:

Party		Votes	%	Seats		
Party		Votes	%	Con.	Lev.	Tot.
Swedish Social Democratic Party	S	58,979	41.94%	4	0	4
Moderate Party	M	38,930	27.68%	3	0	3
Left Party	V	12,071	8.58%	1	0	1
Christian Democrats	KD	10,752	7.65%	1	0	1
Green Party	MP	4,989	3.55%	0	0	0
Liberal People's Party	FP	4,988	3.55%	0	0	0
Centre Party	C	1,498	1.07%	0	0	0
Other parties		8,428	5.99%	0	0	0
Valid votes		140,635	100.00%	9	0	9
Rejected votes		3,150	2.19%			
Total polled		143,785	77.29%			
Registered electors		186,036				

The following candidates were elected:

- Constituency seats (personal mandates) - Göran Persson (S), 15,117 votes.
- Constituency seats (party mandates) - Sten Andersson (M), 2,479 votes; Margit Gennser (M), 1,258 votes; Marie Granlund (S), 458 votes; Britt-Marie Lindkvist (S), 239 votes; Lars-Erik Lövdén (S), 323 votes; Sten Lundström (V), 693 votes; Bertil Persson (M), 519 votes; and Maj-Britt Wallhorn (KD), 2 votes.

Permanent substitutions:

- Maj-Britt Wallhorn (KD) resigned on 15 October 1999 and was replaced by Magda Ayoub (KD) on the same day.

===== 1994 =====
Results of the 1994 general election held on 18 September 1994:

Party		Votes	%	Seats		
Party		Votes	%	Con.	Lev.	Tot.
Swedish Social Democratic Party	S	71,442	48.76%	5	0	5
Moderate Party	M	40,454	27.61%	3	0	3
Liberal People's Party	FP	8,350	5.70%	0	0	0
Left Party	V	6,513	4.45%	0	0	0
Green Party	MP	5,364	3.66%	0	0	0
Christian Democratic Unity	KDS	3,621	2.47%	0	0	0
New Democracy	NyD	2,940	2.01%	0	0	0
Centre Party	C	2,933	2.00%	0	0	0
Other parties		4,892	3.34%	0	0	0
Valid votes		146,509	100.00%	8	0	8
Rejected votes		2,973	1.99%			
Total polled		149,482	84.46%			
Registered electors		176,976				

The following candidates were elected: Sten Andersson (M); Margit Gennser (M); Marie Granlund (S); Kurt Ove Johansson (S); Lars-Erik Lövdén (S); Bertil Persson (M); Birthe Sörestedt (S); and Nils T. Svensson (S).
