= 1994 in Sweden =

- Decades: 1970s; 1980s; 1990s; 2000s; 2010s
- See also: Other events of 1994; Timeline of Swedish history

Events from the year 1994 in Sweden

== Incumbents ==
- Monarch – Carl XVI Gustaf
- Prime Minister – Carl Bildt, Ingvar Carlsson

== Events ==
=== May ===
- 9 May – Sweden has joined NATO's Partnership for Peace programme.

=== September ===
- 18 September – The 1994 Swedish general election.
- 28 September – Sinking of the MS Estonia: the car ferry MS Estonia sank in the Baltic Sea, killing 852.

== Popular culture ==
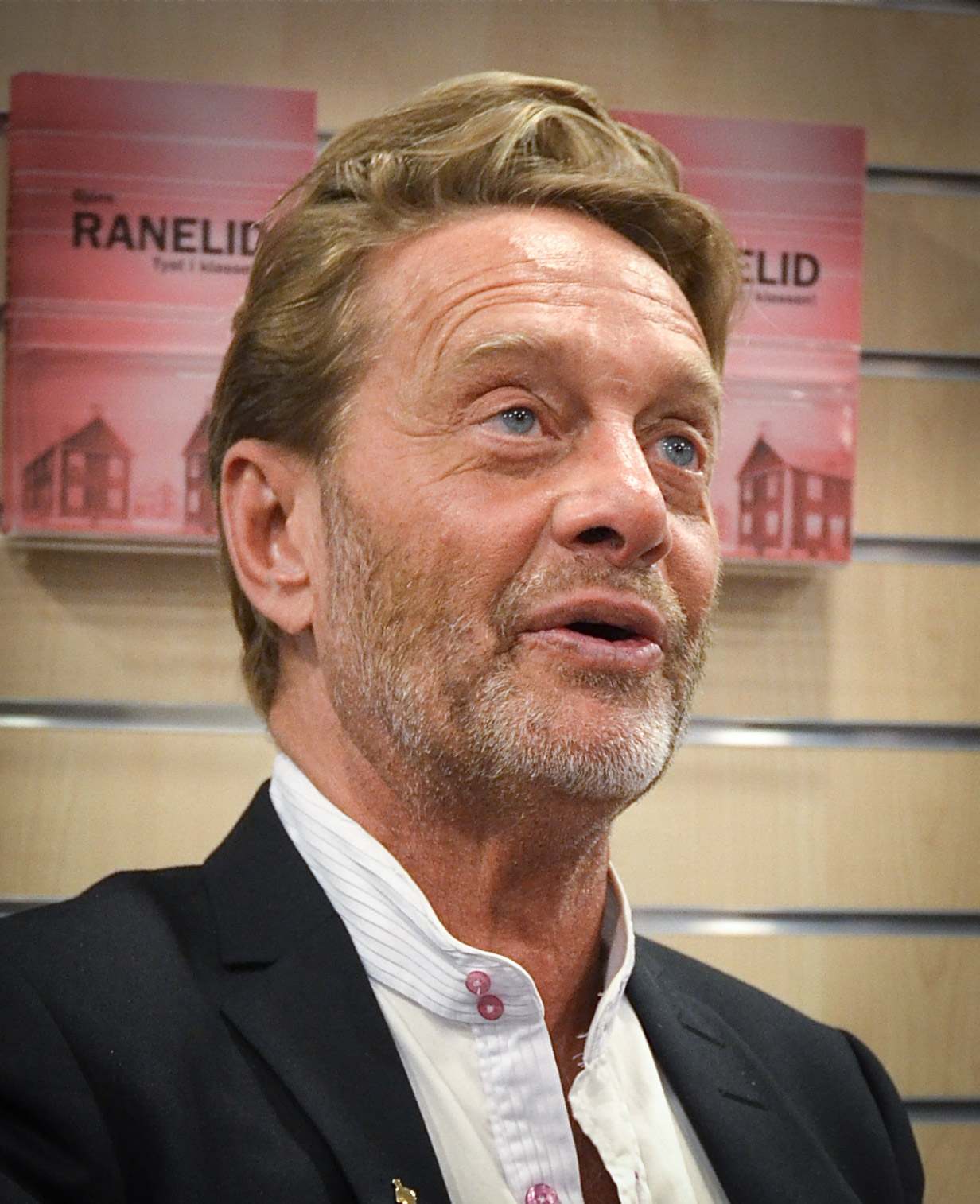
Björn Ranelid, winner of the August Prize in 1994.

=== Literature ===
- Synden, novel by Björn Ranelid, winner of the August Prize.

=== Sports ===
- 84 athletes competed for Sweden at the 1994 Winter Olympics
- The 1994 Allsvenskan was won by IFK Göteborg

== Births ==
- 27 February – Max Örnskog, ice hockey player.
- 3 June – Andreas Lennkvist Manriquez, politician
- 6 June – Moa Lignell, singer
- 20 June – Malte Tängmark Roos, politician
- Unknown date – Arwin Sohrabi, politician

== Deaths ==
- 5 July – Lennart Klingström, canoer (born 1916).

== See also ==
- 1994 in Swedish television
