= Lars-Erik Lövdén =

Swedish politician (born 1950)

Governor of Halland County
- In office January 2005 – January 2014
- Preceded by: Karin Starrin
- Succeeded by: Lena Sommestad

Minister for Housing and Local Government
- In office 16 November 1998 – 21 October 2004
- Preceded by: Lars Engqvist
- Succeeded by: Mona Sahlin

Minister of the Interior
- In office 16 November 1998 – 31 December 1998
- Preceded by: Lars Engqvist

Member of the Riksdag
- In office 10 January 1980 – 31 October 2004
- Preceded by: Arne Pettersson
- Succeeded by: Hillevi Larsson
- Constituency: Malmö Municipality

Personal details
- Born: Lars-Erik Lövdén; 1950 (age 75–76) Malmö, Sweden
- Party: Social Democratic Party
- Education: Lund University

Lars-Erik Lövdén (born 1950) is a Swedish politician, former government minister and former member of the Riksdag, the national legislature. A member of the Social Democratic Party, he represented Malmö Municipality between January 1980 and October 2004. He was also a substitute member of the Riksdag twice: between October 1979 and November 1979 (for Grethe Lundblad); and between November 1979 and December 1979 (for Eric Holmqvist).

Lövdén was born in Malmö. He is the son of Sten Lövdén and Inga Lövdén (née Roslind). He has a Bachelor of Laws degree from Lund University (1975).

Lövdén was Minister for Housing and Local Government between November 1998 and October 2004 and Minister of the Interior between November 1998 and December 1998. He was Governor of Halland County between January 2005 and January 2014. He is currently president of MKB Fastighets AB, the local municipal housing company in Malmö.
