= Ollén =

Ollén is a Swedish surname.

== People with the surname ==
- Bengt Ollén (born 1950), Swedish choral conductor
- Peter Ollén (born 1959), Swedish politician

== See also ==
- Ollé
