= Zinaida Kajevic =

Swedish politician (born 1979)

Member of the Riksdag
- Incumbent
- Assumed office 28 September 2026
- Constituency: Malmö Municipality
- In office 27 November 2023 – 30 January 2024
- In office 6 March 2023 – 7 August 2023

Personal details
- Born: 1979 (age 46–47) Yugoslavia
- Party: Swedish Social Democratic Party

Zinaida Kajevic (born 1979) is a Swedish politician for the Swedish Social Democratic Party. She has been a member of the Riksdag since 2023.

Kajevic ran in the 2022 Swedish general election and became a substitute. She was a serving substitute in the Riksdag for Joakim Sandell during the period from 6 March to 7 August 2023, and for Rose-Marie Carlsson during the period from 27 November 2023 to 30 January 2024. In the Riksdag, Kajevic was an additional substitute in the Committee on Finance, the Committee on Defence, and the Committee on Education.

== See also ==
- List of members of the Riksdag, 2022–2026
- List of members of the Riksdag, 2026–2030
