= Kajevic =

Kajevic or Kajević is a surname.

== People with the surname ==
- Asmir Kajević (born 1990), Montenegrin professional footballer
- Zinaida Kajevic (born 1979), Swedish politician

== See also ==
- Kajkavian
