= Bassem Nasr =

Swedish politician

Member of the Riksdag
- In office 7 November 2022 – 9 April 2023
- Preceded by: Rasmus Ling
- Constituency: Malmö Municipality

Personal details
- Born: 27 March 1981 (age 45) Lebanon
- Party: Green Party

Bassem Nasr (born 27 March 1981) is a Lebanese-born Swedish politician from the Green Party. He was a Member of Parliament (acting substitute) from November 2022 to April 2023 for the Malmö municipality constituency.

Nasr ran in the 2022 Swedish general election and became a substitute. He was the acting substitute in the Riksdag for Rasmus Ling from 7 November 2022 to 9 April 2023. In the Riksdag, Nasr was a substitute member of the EU Committee, the Constitutional Committee and the Social Insurance Committee , and an additional substitute member of the Committee on Justice.

== See also ==
- List of members of the Riksdag, 2022–2026
- List of members of the Riksdag, 2026–2030
