= Anfal Mahdi =

Swedish politician (born 1989)

- Mahdi in 2024

Member of the Riksdag
- Incumbent
- Assumed office 28 September 2026
- Constituency: Malmö Municipality

Personal details
- Born: 15 April 1989 (age 37)
- Party: Left Party

Anfal Mahdi (born 15 April 1989) is an Iraqi-born Swedish politician who was elected member of the Riksdag in 2026. She has been a municipal councillor of Malmö since 2022.
