= Patrick Reslow =

Swedish politician (born 1970)

Patrick Reslow SD M
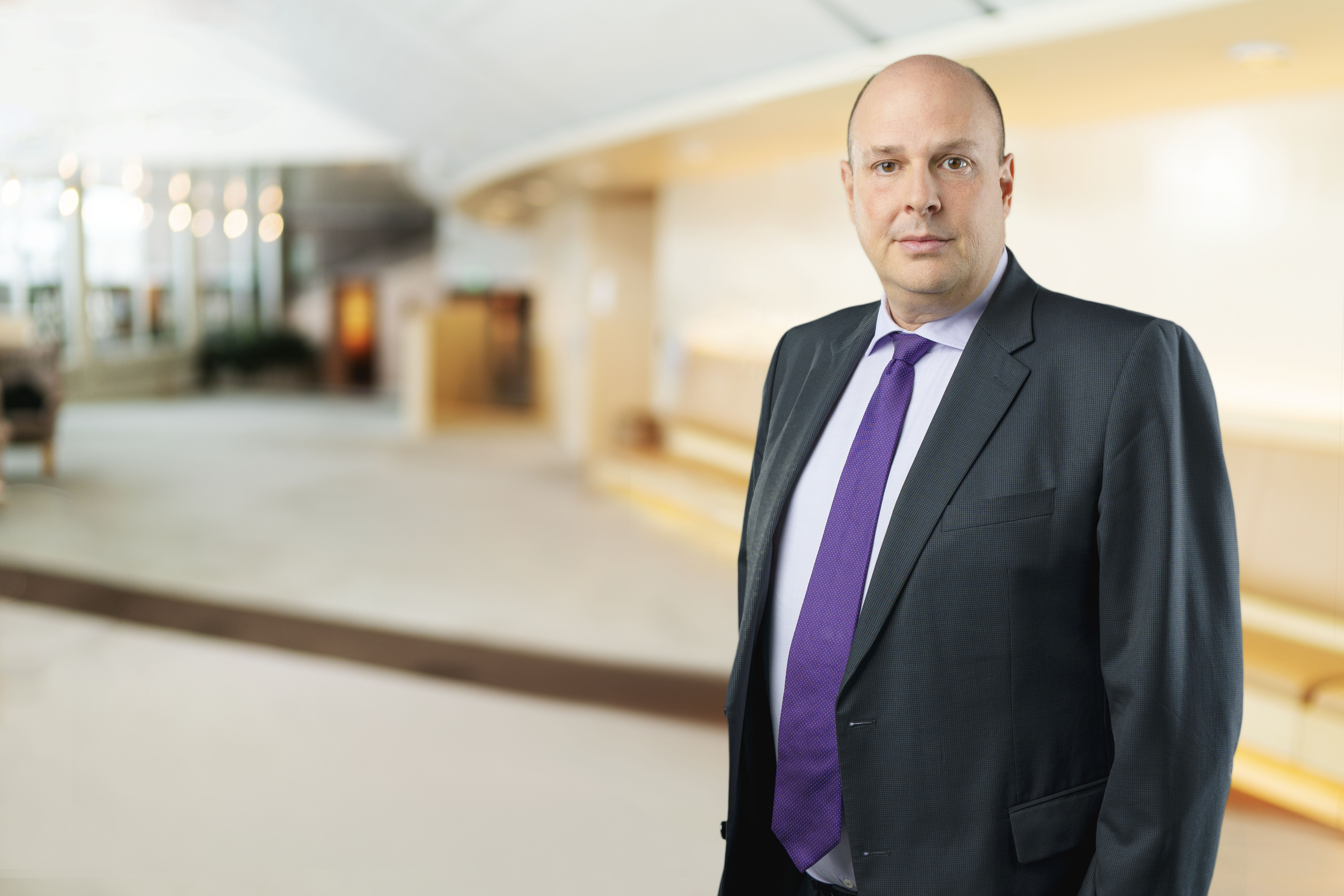
- Patrick Reslow's official portrait Picture: Sveriges riksdag

Member of the Riksdag for Malmö Municipality constituency
- In office 19 September 2010 – 8 September 2018

Member of the Riksdag for Värmland County constituency
- Incumbent
- Assumed office 24 September 2018

Personal details
- Born: 28 May 1970 (age 56) Malmö, Skåne County, Sweden
- Party: Sweden Democrats (2017–present); Independent (from 17 May 2017); Moderate Party (2010–2017)
- Education: Lund University
- Occupation: Politician

Bert Patrick Reslow (born 28 May 1970 in Malmö) is a Swedish politician and lawyer who has been a member of the Riksdag since 2010 representing the constituency of Malmö Municipality from 2010 until 2018, during the 2018 general elections he was elected to represent the constituency of Värmland County. He was first elected as an MP for the Moderate Party but defected to the Sweden Democrats in 2017. He is currently taking up seat number 45 in the Riksdag.

When Reslow first joined the Riksdag he was a member of the Justice Committee from October 2010 until September 2014. After the 2014 general election he left the Justice Committee and became a member of the Constitutioninal Committee from October 2014 until June 2017. After the 2018 general elections, he became a member of the Committee on Education in October 2018.

== Early life and education ==
Reslow was born in Malmö in 1970. He spent part of his upbringing in the United States where he attended Wooster High School in Ohio before returning to Sweden. He went on to study at Lund University and the University of Trier in Germany between 1990 and 1998, completing a bachelor's degree in law before graduating with a Master's degree in political science. From 2006 to 2010 he was a research fellow in the law faculty at Lund while working as a political secretary for the mayor's office in Malmo. He subsequently graduated with a PhD in law in 2010.

== Political career ==
Reslow became a member of parliament for the Moderate Party in the 2010 election and subsequently served on the Justice Committee in the Riksdag. In 2017, Reslow announced he was joining the Sweden Democrats, motivated by concerns over immigration and personal opposition to the December Agreement, which the Moderates had made to prevent the Sweden Democrats from voting down a budget from the Social Democrats. He was re-elected in the 2018 election, representing the Sweden Democrats, and again in the 2022 election.
