= Marianne Berg =

Swedish politician (born 1954)

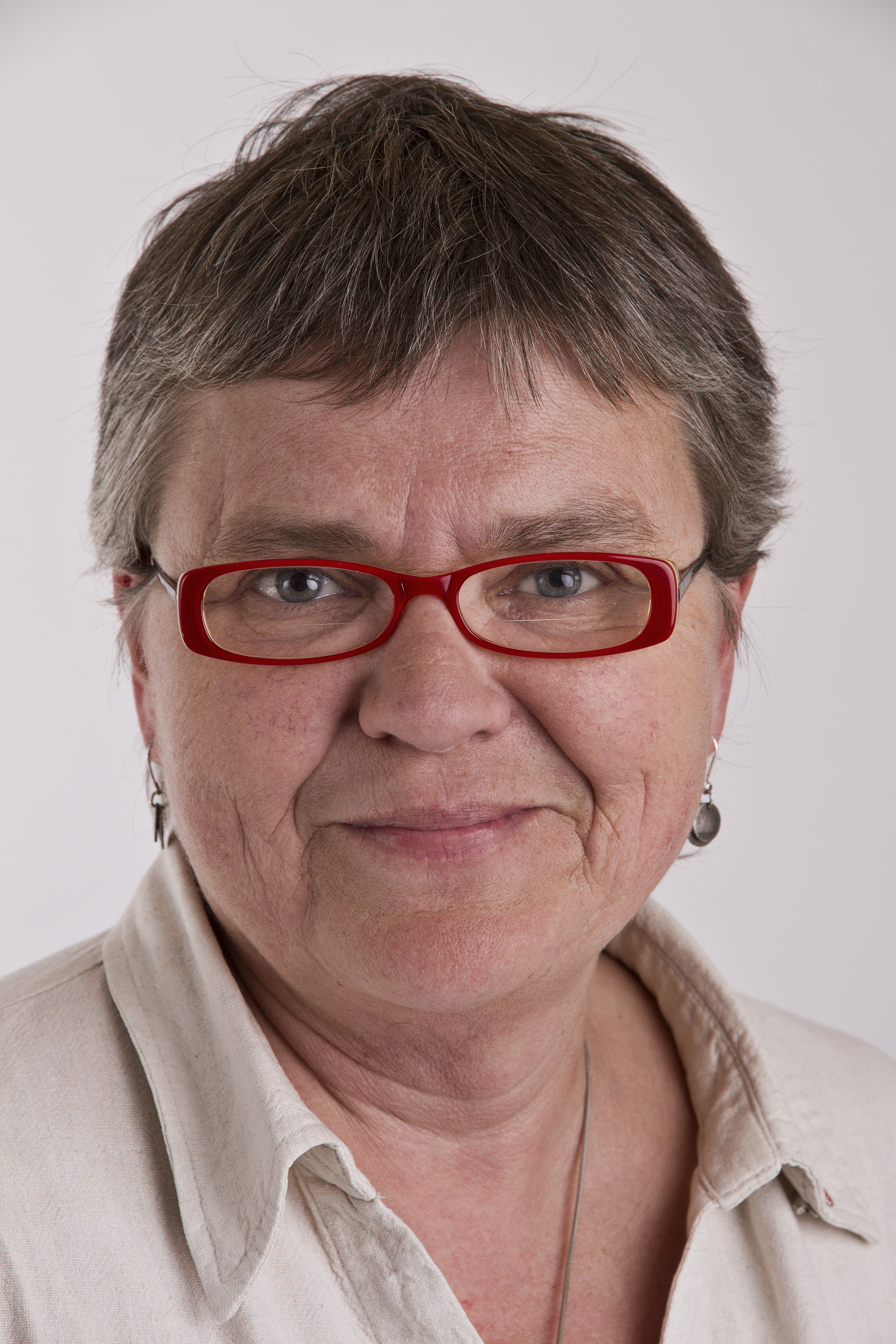

Member of the Swedish Parliament for Malmö
- Incumbent
- Assumed office 2006

Personal details
- Born: 1954 (age 70–71)
- Party: Left Party

Marianne Berg (born 1954) is a Swedish Left Party politician. She has been a member of the Riksdag since 2006 representing Malmö. She is openly lesbian.
