= Niels Paarup-Petersen =

Swedish politician (born 1978)

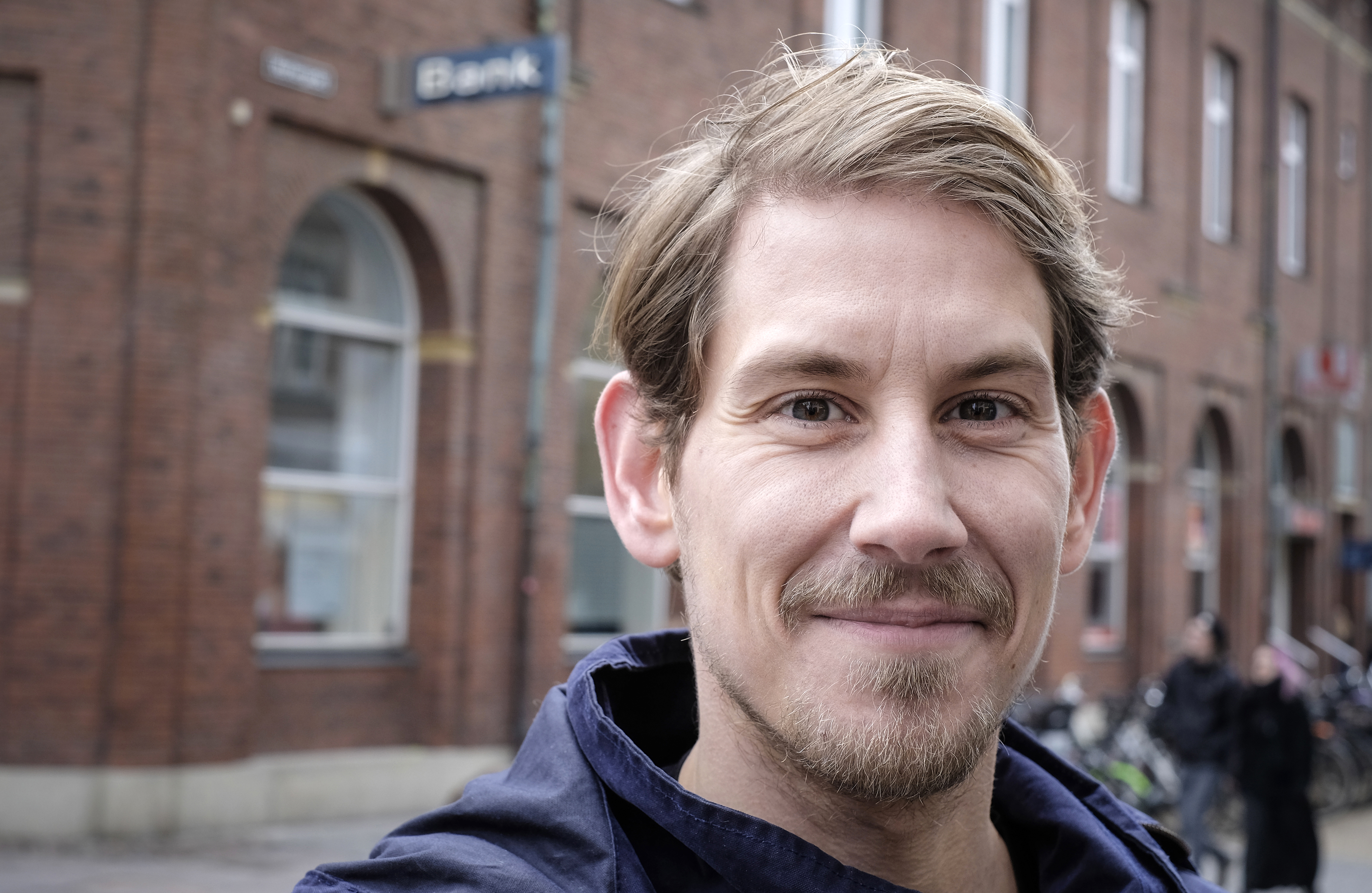
- Paarup-Petersen in 2016

Member of the Riksdag
- Incumbent
- Assumed office 24 September 2018
- Constituency: Malmö Municipality

Personal details
- Born: 1978 (age 47–48)
- Party: Centre

Niels Paarup-Petersen (born 1978) is a Swedish politician. Since September 2018, he serves as Member of the Riksdag representing the constituency of Malmö Municipality. He was also elected as Member of the Riksdag in September 2022. He is affiliated with the Centre Party.
