= Luciano Astudillo =

Swedish politician (born 1972)

Luciano Astudillo (born 1972) is an ordinary member of the Swedish Riksdag. He is a member of the Social Democratic party and represents the City of Malmö. Elected in 2006 he is currently a member of the Labour committee. Prior to 2006 he worked in Deputy Prime Minister's office as a substitute.
