= Daniel Sestrajcic =

Swedish politician (born 1976)

Member of the Riksdag
- In office 29 September 2014 – 31 August 2017
- Succeeded by: Momodou Malcolm Jallow
- Constituency: Malmö Municipality

Personal details
- Born: 1976 (age 49–50)
- Party: Left Party

Daniel Sestrajcic (born 1976) is a Swedish politician and former member of the Riksdag, the national legislature. A member of the Left Party, he represented Malmö Municipality between September 2014 and August 2017.

Sestrajcic has been a member of the municipal council in Malmö Municipality since 2019. He was amongst a group of protestors who, on 8 October 2015, tried to prevent the police from removing a camp set-up outside the Swedish Migration Agency's offices in Malmö by Palestinian refugees. He was convicted of disobeying law enforcement and fined SEK 25,000.

In 2015, he was a passenger on the Freedom Flotilla III, the fourth attempt to break the Israeli blockade associated with the Swedish Ship to Gaza group. The vessel Sestrajcic had boarded in Gothenburg was intercepted in international waters by the Israeli navy on 29 June 2015.
