= Nima Gholam Ali Pour =

Iranian-born Swedish author (born 1981)

Member of the Riksdag
- Incumbent
- Assumed office 26 September 2022
- Constituency: Malmö Municipality

Personal details
- Born: 29 November 1981 (age 44) Iran
- Party: Sweden Democrats (2013-present); Swedish Social Democrats (before 2013).
- Occupation: Politician, author, activist

Nima Gholam Ali Pour (born 29 November 1981) is an Iranian-born Swedish politician, author, activist, political commentator and journalist. Since the 2022 Swedish general election, he has been a member of the Riksdag representing the Sweden Democrats party for the Malmö Municipality constituency.

== Early life ==
Ali Pour was born in Iran in 1981. His family fled the country after his mother was charged with sheltering left-wing activists opposing the Iranian regime. They were admitted into Sweden as refugees in 1987. His parents ran a library in Iran and then worked at a pre-school in Sweden. As an adult, Pour trained as a teacher and attended Malmö Högskola where he graduated with a master's degree in International Migration and Ethnic Relations.

== Career ==
Pour is a co-founder and spokesman for Perspective On Israel, a Swedish organization founded in 2013 that claims to seek to counteract negative or biased perceptions against Israel in Swedish politics and the media. Ali Pour has written articles for The Local, The Jerusalem Post, Ynet, Gatestone Institute, Expressen and Frontpage Magazine. In 2015, Pour published the book Why Multiculturalism is Oppression taken from a collection of his blogs and articles. The book argues multiculturalism defines the individual's complex identity through simple external attributes, and has been a cause of antisemitism and Islamic extremism in Europe. In 2018, Pour accused Malmö city council of using taxpayer's money to help fund antisemitic groups.

Pour was a member of the Swedish Social Democrats but resigned from the party in 2013 after it appointed former Sveriges Unga Muslimer and Islamic Association of Sweden leader Omar Mustafa to the party's executive board. Pour subsequently joined the Sweden Democrats, arguing that Sweden needed tougher policies on immigration and integration. He serves as on the SD's executive board in Malmö and is a group leader in Malmö primary school board.

During the 2022 general election in Sweden, he stood for the Sweden Democrats in the Malmö Municipality and was elected.

In 2023, Pour gained media attention for referring to Swedish mosques as "nests of evil".

== Works ==
- 2015 - Därför är mångkultur förtryck (Why Multiculturalism is Oppression) (2015) ISBN 9789163794452
- 2017 - Allah bestämmer inte i Sverige (Allah does not rule in Sweden: on Islam and other uncomfortable issues in Sweden today) Middle Eastern Forum (2017) ISBN 9789163944246

== See also ==
- List of members of the Riksdag, 2022–2026
