= Malte Tängmark Roos =

Swedish politician (born 1994)

Member of the Riksdag
- In office 10 February 2025 – 28 September 2026
- Preceded by: Rasmus Ling
- Constituency: Malmö Municipality

Personal details
- Born: Carl Malte Roos; 20 June 1994 (age 32) Halmstad, Sweden
- Party: Green Party

Carl Malte Tängmark Roos (born 20 June 1994) is a Swedish politician and former Member of the Riksdag. A member of the Green Party, he has represented Malmö Municipality from February 2025 to September 2026.

Tängmark Roos was born on 20 June 1994 in Halmstad. He is the son of Christine Hellman Roos and Michael Roos. He has one brother and grew up in the Nyatorp suburb of Halmstad. He was a student at Sannarpsgymnasiet. He has lived in Malmö, where he studied and worked, since 2013. He was an intern for Afrikagrupperna and was later an organisational secretary.

Tängmark Roos joined the Green Party when he was 17-years old and was a member of Young Greens. He was a spokesperson for Gröna studenter. He was a member of Malmö City Council and the local school board. He was appointed to the Riksdag in February 2025 following the resignation of Rasmus Ling. He was the Green Party's spokesperson on social insurance policy.

Electoral history of Malte Tängmark Roos
Election	Constituency	Party	List no.	Votes	%	Result
2018 general	Malmö Municipality	Green Party	9	59	0.55%	Not elected
2018 local	Malmö Municipality	Green Party	20	55	0.51%	Not elected
2019 European	Sweden	Green Party	24	520	0.11%	Not elected
2022 general	Malmö Municipality	Green Party	5	77	0.54%	Not elected
2022 local	Malmö Municipality	Green Party	6	82	0.76%	Not elected
2026 general	Malmö Municipality	Green Party	3	179	0.91%	Not elected
