= 1994 in Swedish television =

This is a list of Swedish television related events from 1994.

== Events ==
- Unknown - The first season of Sikta mot stjärnorna was won by Olle Nilsson performing as John Lennon.
- 7 September - Long running Australian soap opera Prisoner: Cell Block H is transmitted on television screens and homes across Sweden for the first time ever. The series will begin airing on TV4.

== Debuts ==
=== Domestic ===
- 9 September - Sikta mot stjärnorna (1994-2002), a series hosted by Lasse Holm in which members of the public impersonate their favourite singers.

=== International ===
- 7 September - (Australia) Prisoner: Cell Block H (1979-1986) (TV4)

=== Changes of network affiliation ===
Shows	Moved from	Moved to
(United Kingdom) Emmerdale	SVT2	TV4

== Television series ==
- 1 October-17 December - Bert
- 1–24 December - Håll huvudet kallt

== Channels ==
Launches:

- 3 May: TV6

== Deaths ==
Date	Name	Age	Cinematic Credibility
21 October	Thore Ehrling	81	Swedish composer

== See also ==
- 1994 in Sweden
