= Noria Manouchi =

Swedish politician (born 1991)

Noria Manouchi (born 1991) is a Swedish politician from the Moderate Party. Since the 2018 general election, she has served as Member of the Riksdag representing the constituency of Malmö.

She was also elected as Member of the Riksdag in September 2022.
