= Banesa Martinez Roldán =

Swedish politician (born 1982)

Banesa Martinez Roldan

Member of the Riksdag
- Incumbent
- Assumed office 28 September 2026
- Constituency: Malmö Municipality

Personal details
- Born: 1982 (age 43–44) Uruguay
- Party: Left Party

Banesa Martinez Roldán (born 1982) is a Uruguayan-born Swedish politician for the Left Party. She has been a member of the Riksdag since 2026, elected for the Malmö Municipality constituency.

== Biography ==
Martinez Roldán works as a communicator in social administration and has a post-secondary education of less than three years.

She has been politically active for the Left Party in Region Skåne, where she has been a member of the regional council and the patient committee.

Ahead of the 2026 Swedish general election, Martinez Roldán was put in first place on the Left Party's parliamentary list in Malmö Municipality. She was elected to the parliament for the Malmö municipality constituency.

== See also ==
- List of members of the Riksdag, 2026–2030
