= Louise Eklund (politician) =

Swedish politician (born 1979)

Member of the Riksdag
- Incumbent
- Assumed office 26 September 2022
- Constituency: Malmö Municipality

Personal details
- Born: 1979 (age 46–47) Malmöhus County, Sweden
- Party: Liberal

Louise Eleonor Eklund (formerly Bergström; born 1979) is a Swedish politician from the Liberals who was elected a member of parliament in 2022.

== See also ==
- List of members of the Riksdag, 2022–2026
