= Arwin Sohrabi =

Swedish politician (born 1994)

Member of the Riksdag
- Incumbent
- Assumed office 28 September 2026
- Constituency: Malmö Municipality

Personal details
- Born: 1994 (age 31–32) Malmö, Sweden
- Party: Social Democratic Party

Sam Arwin Sohrabi Nejad (born 1994) is a Swedish politician and Member of the Riksdag. A member of the Social Democratic Party, he has represented Malmö Municipality since September 2026.

Sohrabi was born in 1994 in Malmö. He is a project manager.

Sohrabi was a member of Malmö City Council. He was a candidate in the 2024 European election in Sweden. He was a substitute member of the Riksdag for Rose-Marie Carlsson between May 2023 and July 2023. He was elected to the Riksdag at the 2026 general election.
