= Momodou Malcolm Jallow =

Swedish politician (born 1975)

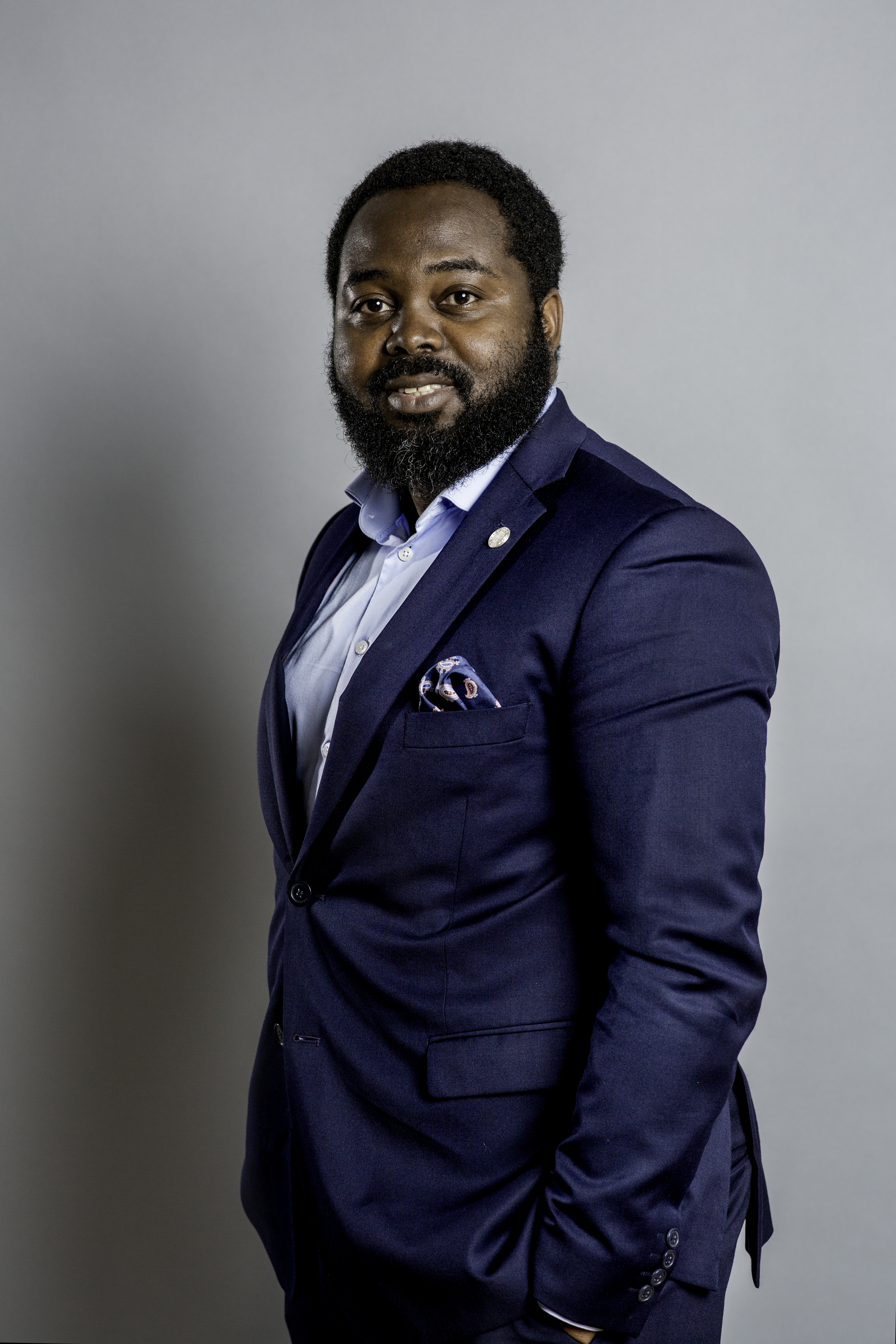
- Jallow in 2018.

Member of the Riksdag for Malmö City
- In office 31 August 2017 – 12 September 2022

Personal details
- Born: 11 October 1975 (age 50) Bakau, The Gambia
- Party: Future Left (since 2026)
- Other political affiliations: Left (2017–2026)

Momodou Malcolm Jallow (born 11 October 1975) is a Gambian-born Swedish politician. He has been a regular Member of Parliament since 2017, elected for Malmö Municipality constituency.

== Early life and activism ==
Jallow was born in Bakau in 1975. He moved to Sweden when he was a teenager, eventually settling in Malmö and becoming involved in social activism. In 2010, he faced a series of threats after criticising a mock slave auction on the grounds of Lund University. In 2014, Jallow was the defendant in a case that resulted in the first guilty verdict in a racist hate crime case in Sweden.

In 2018, Jallow filed a complaint against the state of Denmark before the UN Committee on the Elimination of Racial Discrimination. The case alleged that an art exhibit in the Folketing had constituted a hate crime against Jallow, as one of the artworks depicted Jallow being hung and another referred to him as a racial slur. The case was resolved in his favor in 2023, with the committee requiring a public apology and compensation to be paid to Jallow.

== Career ==
He became a Member of the Riksdag for the Left Party in 2017, replacing Daniel Sestrajcic. Jallow was elected as Member of the Riksdag in September 2018 and September 2022. In 2025, he became chair of the Riksdag's Civil Affairs Committee, the first person of African descent to do so.

In April 2026, Jallow split from the Left Party and became a political independent in the Riksdag.
