= Max Örnskog =

Swedish ice hockey player

- Born: 27 February 1994 (age 32) Jönköping, Sweden
- Height: 5 ft 11 in (180 cm)
- Weight: 159 lb (72 kg; 11 st 5 lb)
- Position: Centre
- Shot: Left
- Played for: HV71; Tranås AIF; Skövde IK; HC Dalen
- NHL draft: Undrafted
- Playing career: 2012–2017

Max Örnskog (born 27 February 1994) is a Swedish ice hockey player. He made his Elitserien debut playing with HV71 during the 2012–13 Elitserien season.

== Career statistics ==
			Regular season					Playoffs
Season	Team	League	GP	G	A	Pts	PIM	GP	G	A	Pts	PIM
2009–10	HV71 U16	U16 SM	3	1	4	5	0	—	—	—	—	—
2009–10	HV71 J18	J18 Elit	7	0	0	0	2	—	—	—	—	—
2009–10	HV71 J18	J18 Allsvenskan	11	0	0	0	2	—	—	—	—	—
2009–10	HV71 J20	J20 SuperElit	3	0	0	0	0	—	—	—	—	—
2010–11	HV71 J18	J18 Elit	19	12	17	29	8	—	—	—	—	—
2010–11	HV71 J18	J18 Allsvenskan	18	4	4	8	6	—	—	—	—	—
2010–11	HV71 J20	J20 SuperElit	3	0	0	0	0	—	—	—	—	—
2011–12	HV71 J18	J18 Elit	5	4	3	7	2	—	—	—	—	—
2011–12	HV71 J18	J18 Allsvenskan	11	9	9	18	6	3	3	0	3	2
2011–12	HV71 J20	J20 SuperElit	32	4	4	8	6	—	—	—	—	—
2012–13	HV71 J20	J20 SuperElit	42	9	13	22	45	7	1	1	2	0
2012–13	HV71	Elitserien	3	0	0	0	0	—	—	—	—	—
2013–14	HV71 J20	J20 SuperElit	44	9	14	23	20	7	2	2	4	2
2013–14	Tranås AIF	Hockeyettan	3	3	1	4	6	—	—	—	—	—
2014–15	Skövde IK	Hockeyettan	36	9	13	22	12	—	—	—	—	—
2015–16	Skövde IK	Hockeyettan	36	5	9	14	14	2	0	1	1	0
2016–17	HC Dalen	Hockeyettan	35	2	14	16	6	—	—	—	—	—
Elitserien totals			3	0	0	0	0	—	—	—	—	—
Hockeyettan totals			110	19	37	56	38	2	0	1	1	0
