= Leif Jakobsson =

Swedish politician (born 1955)

member of the Riksdag
- In office 1998–2018

Personal details
- Political party: Social Democratic

Leif Jakobsson (born August 24, 1955) is a Swedish Social Democratic politician who was a member of the Riksdag from 1998 to 2018.
