= Olof Lavesson =

Swedish politician (born 1976)

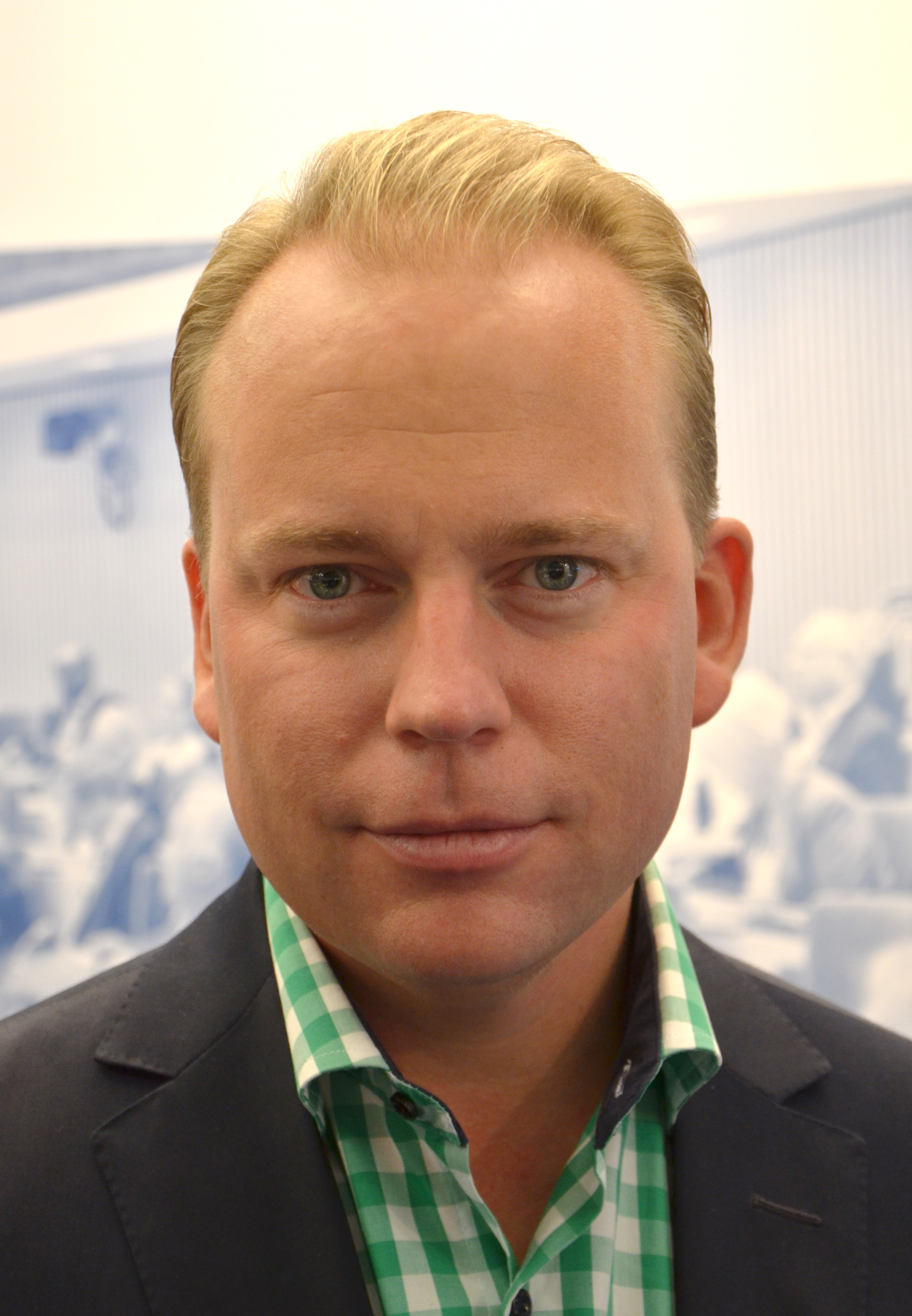

member of the Riksdag
- In office 2006–2018

Personal details
- Political party: Moderate Party

Olof Lavesson, born in 1976, is a Swedish politician of the Moderate Party. He was member of the Riksdag from 2006 to 2018. He is gay.
