= Joakim Sandell =

Swedish politician (born 1975)

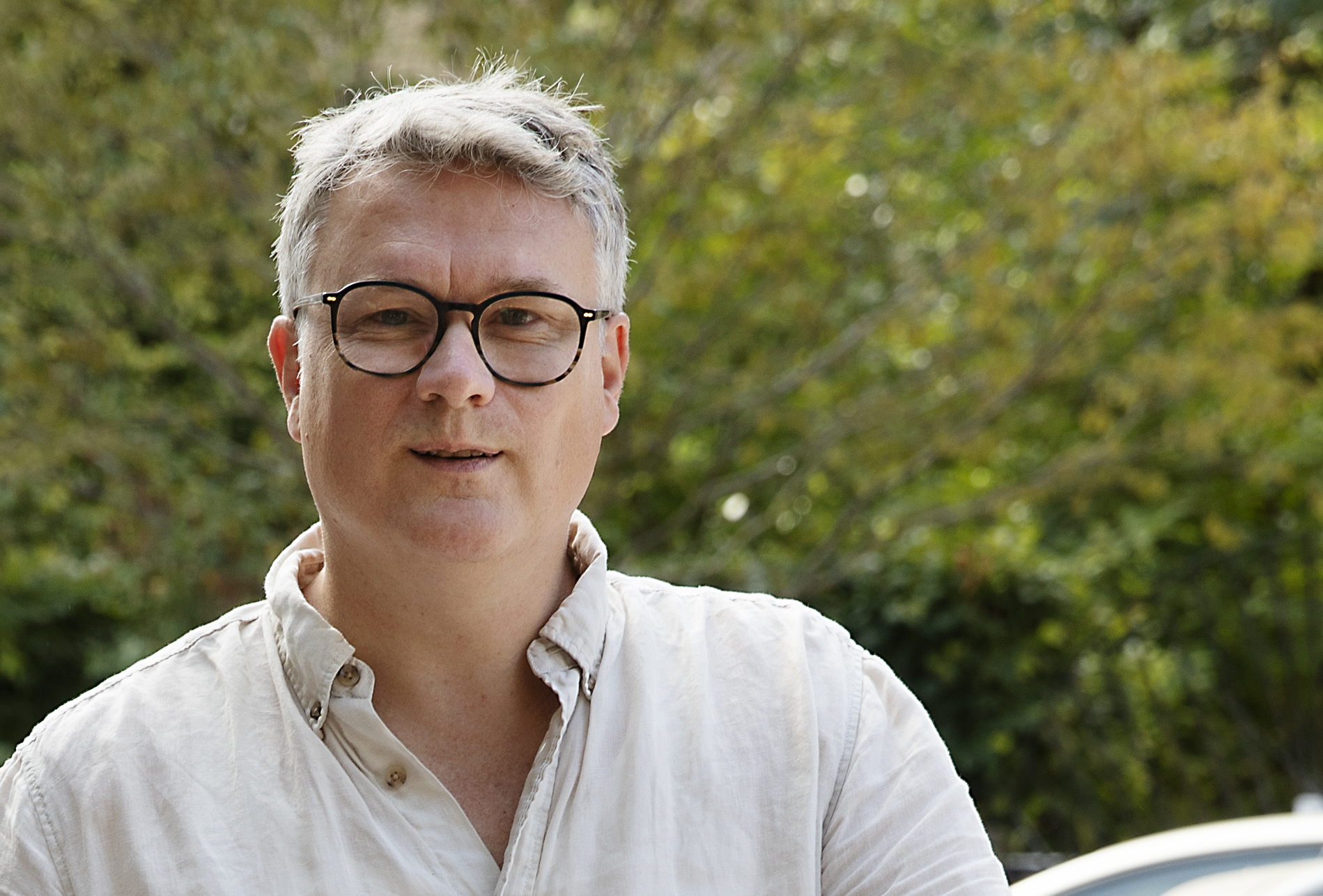
- Sandell in August 2022

Member of the Riksdag
- Incumbent
- Assumed office 24 September 2018
- Constituency: Malmö Municipality

Personal details
- Born: Joakim Reinhold Sandell; 1975 (age 50–51)
- Party: Social Democratic Party

Joakim Reinhold Sandell (born 1975) is a Swedish politician, journalist and member of the Riksdag, the national legislature. A member of the Social Democratic Party, he has represented Malmö Municipality since September 2018.

Sandell is the son of mason Bengt-Göran Sandell and crown inspector Ingerd Sandell (née Eklundh). He was educated in Växjö. He studied at Linnaeus University, Lund University and Malmö University. He was a teacher in Ystad. He was a member of the regional council in Skåne County from 2014 to 2018.
