= Peter Ollén =

Swedish politician (born 1959)

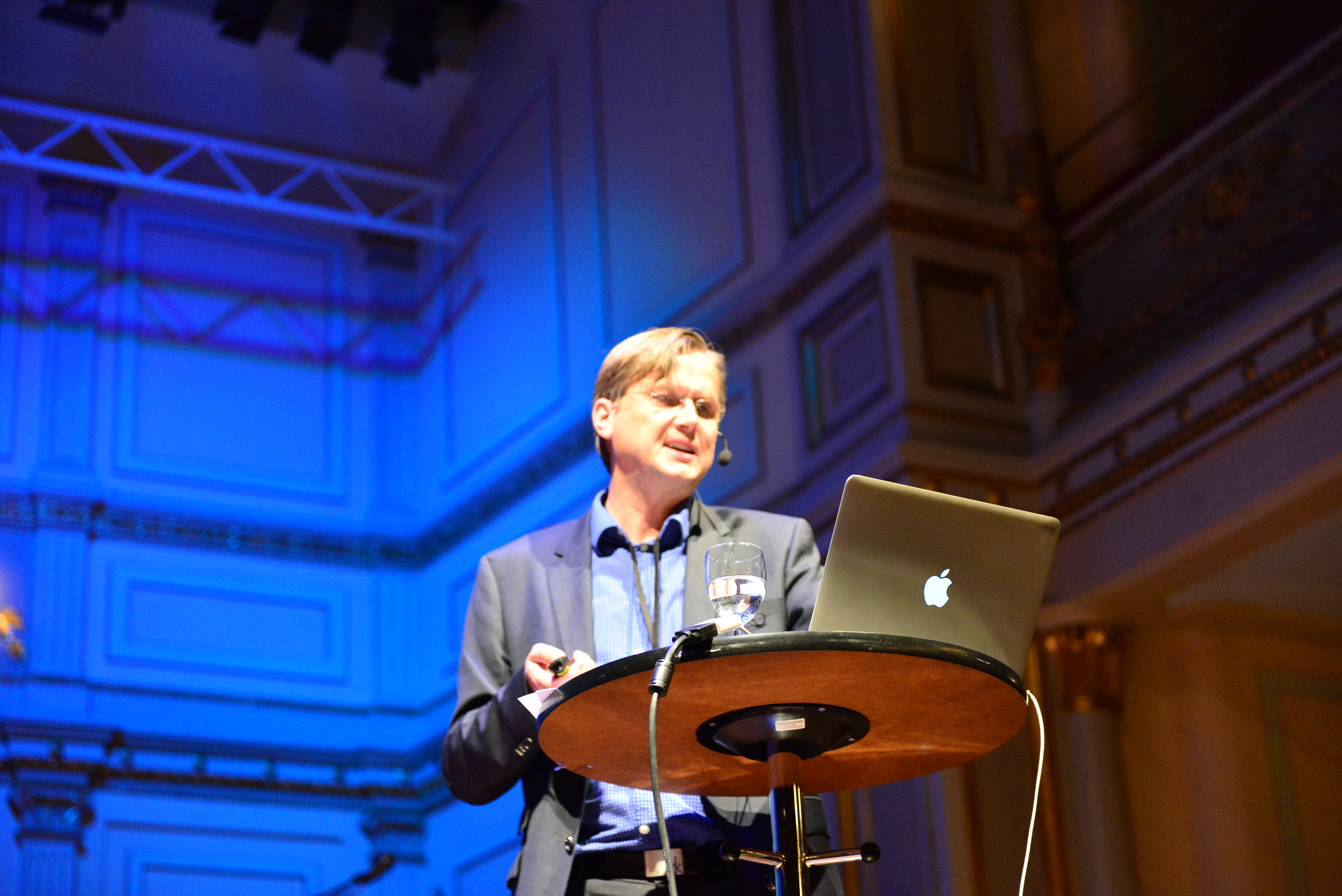
- Peter Ollén in 2013

Member of the Riksdag
- Incumbent
- Assumed office 2022
- Constituency: Malmö Municipality

Personal details
- Born: 27 June 1959 (age 67) Malmöhus County, Sweden
- Party: Moderate Party

Peter Gunnar Ollén (born 27 June 1959) is a Swedish politician from the Moderate Party. He was elected as a member of the Riksdag in the 2022 Swedish general election.

He was elected chairman of the Moderate Party in Malmö in 2017. He was a member of the Malmö City Council for the 2018–2022 term.

Ollén is the editor-in-chief of the magazines Sign&Print and CAP&Design and has written several books on graphic technology. Peter Ollén is the son of Strindberg connoisseur and radio director Gunnar Ollén and brother of, among others, former politician and director general Joakim Ollén and theatre critic Theresa Benér.

== Writings ==
- Praktiska försök på bildbehandlingsutrustning (1986)
- Grafisk teknik i dataåldern (1987, i norsk översättning 1988)
- Håndbog i elektronisk tekst- og billedbehandling (1988, översatt till danska av Joan Alberti)
- Intelligent samarbete kring reklamtryck (1988, med Jørgen Vester och Eivind Winsløw)
- Professionell desktopteknik : grundkunskaper för text- och bildbehandling (1993)
- Digital skrift (1995, med Henrik Holmegaard)
- Framtidstankar : grafisk industri i Sverige (1997, red. Peter Ollén)
