= Marie Granlund =

Swedish politician (born 1962)

Marie Granlund (born 1962) is a Swedish Social Democratic Party politician who was a member of the Riksdag from 1994 to 2018.
