= Rasmus Ling =

Swedish politician (born 1984)

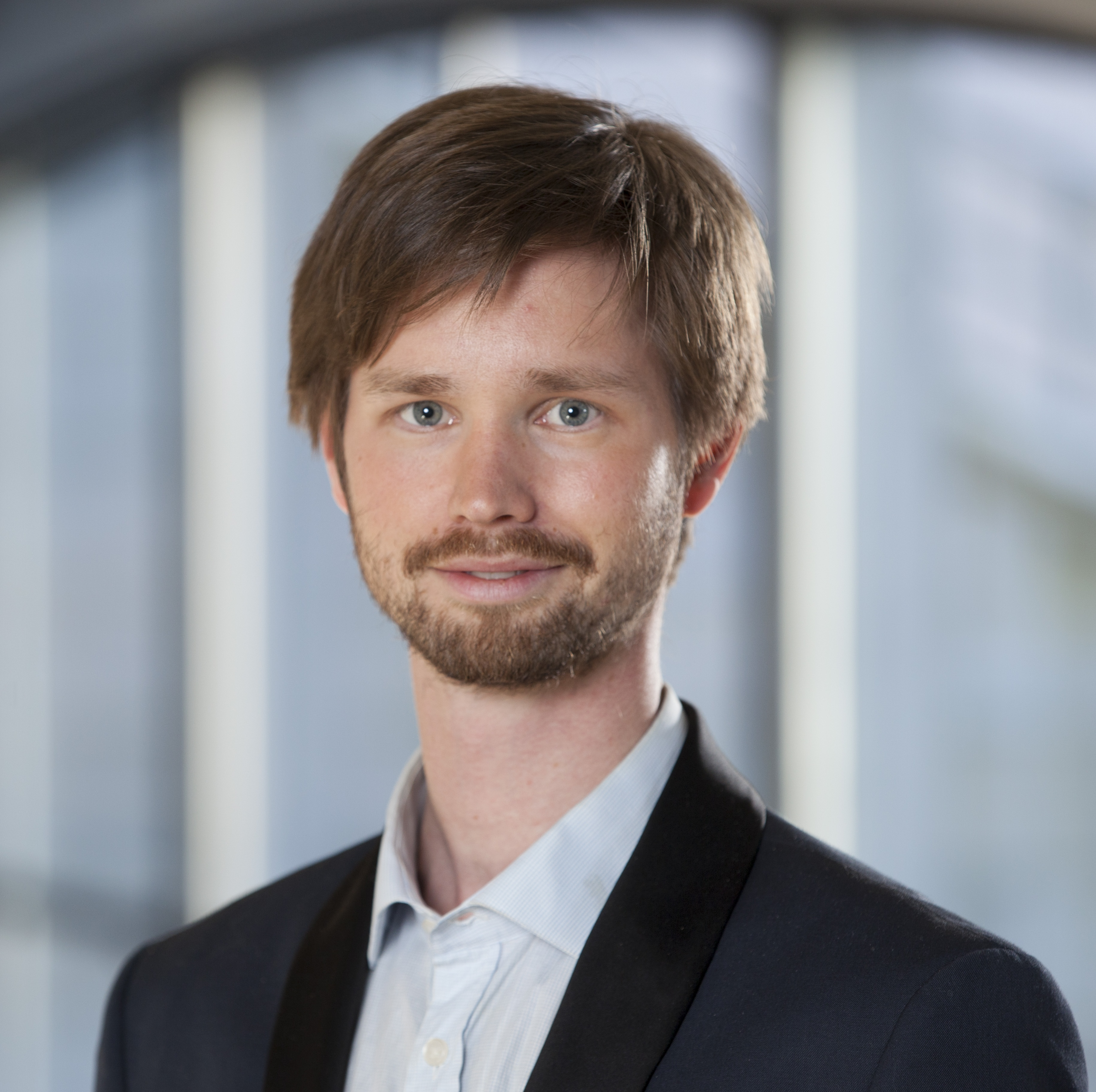
- Ling in 2014

Member of the Riksdag
- Incumbent
- Assumed office 29 September 2014
- Constituency: Malmö Municipality

Personal details
- Born: 1984 (age 41–42) Östersund, Sweden
- Party: Green Party

Rasmus Ling (born 1984) is a Swedish politician. Since September 2014, he serves as Member of the Riksdag. He represents the constituency of Malmö Municipality. He is affiliated with the Green Party.

He was also elected as Member of the Riksdag in September 2022.
