= Hillevi Larsson =

Swedish politician (born 1974)

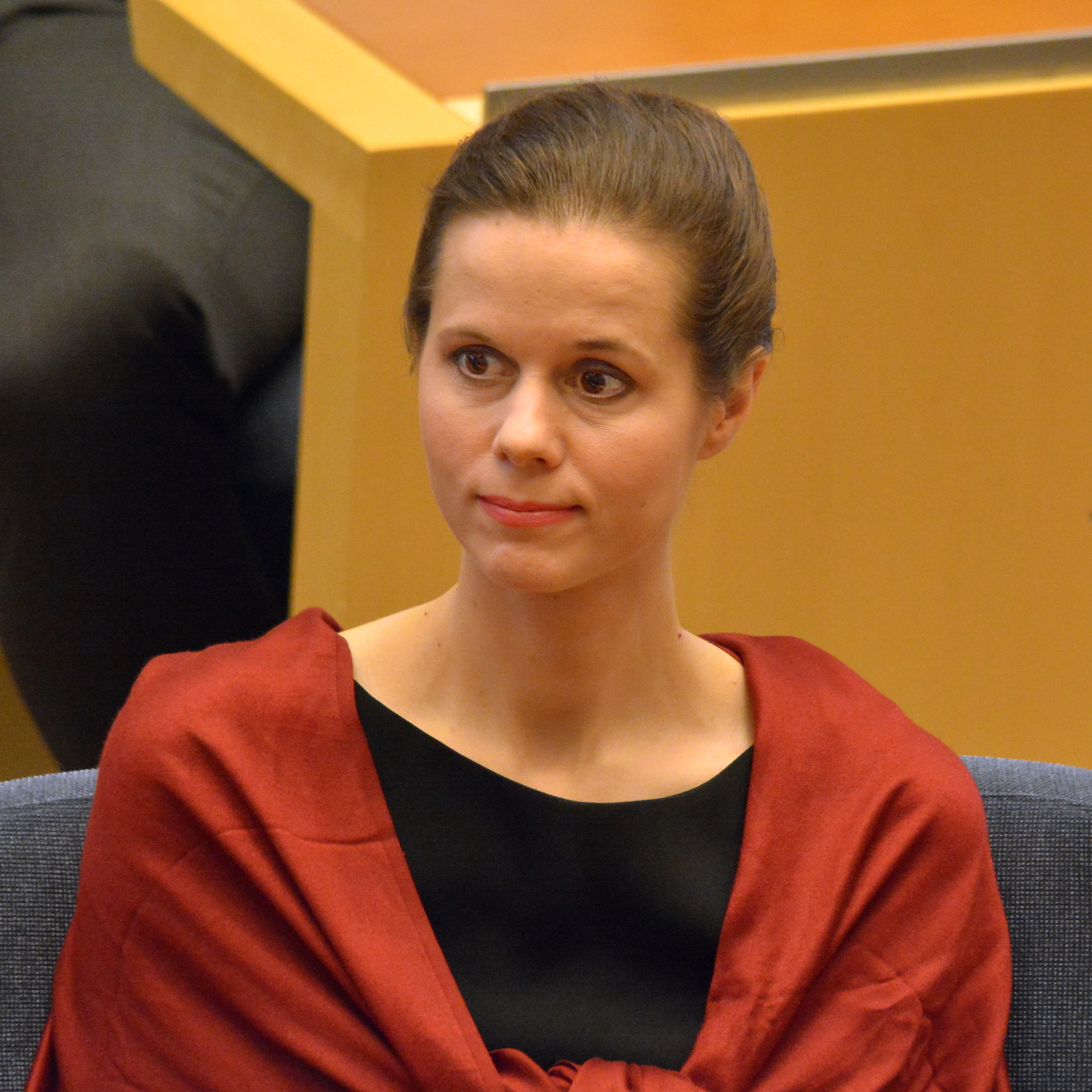

Personal details
- Born: 3 September 1974 (age 51)
- Citizenship: Sweden
- Party: Social democratic

Hillevi Larsson (born 3 September 1974) is a Swedish social democratic politician who has been a member of the Riksdag since 2004.
