= Rose-Marie Carlsson =

Swedish politician (born 1954)

Rose-Marie Carlsson S

Member of the Riksdag
- Incumbent
- Assumed office 2022
- In office 2008–2009

Personal details
- Born: 1954 (age 71–72)
- Party: Swedish Social Democratic Party
- Profession: Politician

Rose-Marie Carlsson (born 1954) is a Swedish politician from the Social Democrats who served as a Member of the Riksdag from 2008 to 2009. She returned to the Riksdag in the 2022 Swedish general election.

In the Riksdag, she served as a member of the housing committee in 1994–2002, and as a vice chairman of this committee in 2002–2006. She was also a deputy in the business committee (1995–1998) and the social insurance committee (1994–1995).
