= Östergötland County (Riksdag constituency) =

Constituency of the Riksdag, the national legislature of Sweden

- Östergötlands Län
- Constituency for the Riksdag
- Location of Östergötland County within Sweden
- County: Östergötland
- Population: 472,530 (2025)
- Electorate: 367,216 (2026)
- Area: 12,280 km^{2} (2026)

Current constituency
- Created: 1970
- Seats: List (Note: Constituency seats only.): 14 (2006–present); 15 (1970–2006)
- Member of the Riksdag: List: Elias Aguirre (S); Johan Andersson (S); Jonas Andersson (SD); Clara Aranda (SD); Teresa Carvalho (S); Muharrem Demirok (C); Matilda Ekeblad (M); Aron Emilsson (SD); Magdalena Hermelin (M); Patrik Karlson (L); Rebecka Le Moine (MP); Eva Lindh (S); Magnus Oscarsson (KD); Malin Östh (V); John Weinerhall (M)
- Created from: Östergötland County

Östergötland County (Swedish: Östergötlands Län) is one of the 29 multi-member constituencies of the Riksdag, the national legislature of Sweden. The constituency was established in 1970 when the Riksdag changed from a bicameral legislature to a unicameral legislature. It is conterminous with the county of Östergötland. The constituency currently elects 14 of the 349 members of the Riksdag using the open party-list proportional representation electoral system. At the 2026 general election it had 367,216 registered electors.

== Electoral system ==
Östergötland County currently elects 14 of the 349 members of the Riksdag using the open party-list proportional representation electoral system. Constituency seats are allocated using the modified Sainte-Laguë method. Only parties that reach the 4% national threshold and parties that receive at least 12% of the vote in the constituency compete for constituency seats. Supplementary levelling seats may also be allocated at the constituency level to parties that reach the 4% national threshold.

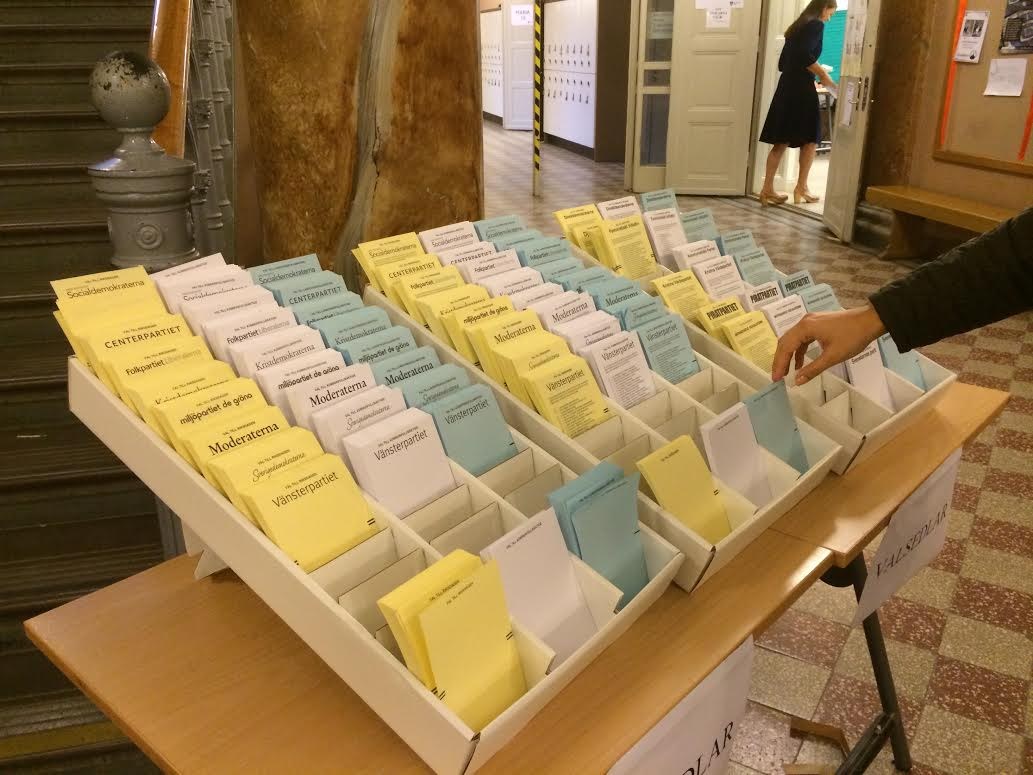
A selection of ballot papers available for voters at the 2014 general election in Stockholm - yellow for the Riksdag, blue for the regional council and white for the municipal council

Prior to 1997 voters could cast any ballot paper they wanted, though it had to contain the name of a party and the name of at least one candidate nominated by that party in the constituency. It was common for parties to hand out ballot papers with their name and list of candidates at the entrance of polling stations. Voters could delete the names of candidates or write-in the names of other candidates but in practice these options weren't used enough by voters to have any significant impact on the results and consequently elections operated as a closed system.

Since 1997, elections in Sweden follow the French model in having separate ballot papers for each party/list in a constituency. There are two ballot papers for each party - a party ballot paper (partivalsedel) with just the name of the party and a name ballot paper (namnvalsedel) with the name of the party and its list of candidates. There are also blank ballot papers (blank valsedel). Voters can initially pick as many ballot papers as they wish and then, in the secrecy of the voting booth, they select a single ballot paper of their choice. If they chose a name ballot paper they have the option of casting a preferential vote for one of their chosen party's candidates. If they chose a blank ballot paper they can write the name of any party including unregistered parties and, optionally, they can write the name of any person as their preferred candidate, even one that does not belong to their chosen party. They then place their chosen ballot paper in an envelope which is placed in the ballot box, discarding all other ballot papers they picked.

Seats won by each party/list in a constituency are allocated to its candidates in order of preference votes (a personal mandate), provided that the candidate has received at least 8% of votes cast for their party in the constituency (5% since January 2011). Any unfilled seats are then allocated to the party's remaining candidates in the order they appear on the party list (a party mandate).

== Election results ==
=== Summary ===
| Election | Left V / VPK | | | Social Democrats S | | | Greens MP | | | Centre C | | | Liberals L / FP / F | | | Moderates M | | | Christian Democrats KD / KDS | | | Sweden Democrats SD | | |
| Election | Votes | % | Seats | Votes | % | Seats | Votes | % | Seats | Votes | % | Seats | Votes | % | Seats | Votes | % | Seats | Votes | % | Seats | Votes | % | Seats |
|---|---|---|---|---|---|---|---|---|---|---|---|---|---|---|---|---|---|---|---|---|---|---|---|---|
| 2026 | 21,957 | 7.06% | 1 | 88,267 | 28.36% | 4 | 17,510 | 5.63% | 1 | 21,213 | 6.82% | 1 | 15,308 | 4.92% | 1 | 63,956 | 20.55% | 3 | 20,539 | 6.60% | 1 | 57,496 | 18.48% | 2 |
| 2022 | 16,884 | 5.62% | 1 | 91,837 | 30.55% | 4 | 13,917 | 4.63% | 1 | 19,479 | 6.48% | 1 | 13,271 | 4.41% | 0 | 59,623 | 19.83% | 3 | 17,943 | 5.97% | 1 | 63,733 | 21.20% | 3 |
| 2018 | 20,352 | 6.77% | 1 | 87,450 | 29.07% | 4 | 12,595 | 4.19% | 0 | 25,162 | 8.37% | 1 | 16,082 | 5.35% | 1 | 61,354 | 20.40% | 3 | 20,065 | 6.67% | 1 | 53,017 | 17.63% | 3 |
| 2014 | 14,011 | 4.81% | 0 | 94,909 | 32.56% | 5 | 19,218 | 6.59% | 1 | 17,443 | 5.98% | 1 | 14,860 | 5.10% | 1 | 64,877 | 22.26% | 3 | 14,752 | 5.06% | 1 | 41,953 | 14.39% | 2 |
| 2010 | 14,242 | 5.09% | 0 | 92,164 | 32.95% | 5 | 21,225 | 7.59% | 1 | 17,561 | 6.28% | 1 | 19,017 | 6.80% | 1 | 80,141 | 28.65% | 4 | 16,357 | 5.85% | 1 | 14,862 | 5.31% | 1 |
| 2006 | 13,628 | 5.20% | 1 | 98,062 | 37.40% | 5 | 13,402 | 5.11% | 1 | 19,884 | 7.58% | 1 | 17,117 | 6.53% | 1 | 65,037 | 24.81% | 4 | 18,831 | 7.18% | 1 | 6,088 | 2.32% | 0 |
| 2002 | 18,222 | 7.26% | 1 | 105,943 | 42.22% | 6 | 12,046 | 4.80% | 1 | 15,254 | 6.08% | 1 | 29,654 | 11.82% | 2 | 36,927 | 14.72% | 2 | 25,784 | 10.28% | 2 | 2,157 | 0.86% | 0 |
| 1998 | 27,767 | 11.12% | 2 | 92,795 | 37.15% | 6 | 11,949 | 4.78% | 1 | 12,842 | 5.14% | 1 | 9,536 | 3.82% | 0 | 54,967 | 22.01% | 3 | 32,821 | 13.14% | 2 | | | |
| 1994 | 14,673 | 5.51% | 1 | 122,703 | 46.05% | 7 | 13,531 | 5.08% | 1 | 20,464 | 7.68% | 1 | 17,769 | 6.67% | 1 | 57,753 | 21.67% | 3 | 12,791 | 4.80% | 1 | | | |
| 1991 | 10,350 | 3.96% | 0 | 101,464 | 38.82% | 7 | 7,775 | 2.97% | 0 | 21,738 | 8.32% | 1 | 21,695 | 8.30% | 1 | 55,196 | 21.12% | 4 | 23,057 | 8.82% | 1 | | | |
| 1988 | 13,009 | 5.07% | 1 | 117,090 | 45.61% | 7 | 13,290 | 5.18% | 1 | 30,374 | 11.83% | 2 | 28,085 | 10.94% | 2 | 44,818 | 17.46% | 2 | 9,143 | 3.56% | 0 | | | |
| 1985 | 11,672 | 4.38% | 0 | 126,695 | 47.53% | 8 | 3,465 | 1.30% | 0 | 34,573 | 12.97% | 2 | 34,348 | 12.89% | 2 | 54,916 | 20.60% | 3 | with C | | | | | |
| 1982 | 12,331 | 4.65% | 1 | 128,217 | 48.36% | 7 | 3,630 | 1.37% | 0 | 39,856 | 15.03% | 2 | 13,521 | 5.10% | 1 | 60,657 | 22.88% | 4 | 6,537 | 2.47% | 0 | | | |
| 1979 | 11,678 | 4.47% | 1 | 121,830 | 46.65% | 7 | | | | 44,815 | 17.16% | 3 | 24,437 | 9.36% | 1 | 51,628 | 19.77% | 3 | 4,886 | 1.87% | 0 | | | |
| 1976 | 9,096 | 3.49% | 0 | 120,385 | 46.19% | 7 | | | | 60,585 | 23.25% | 4 | 24,521 | 9.41% | 2 | 39,985 | 15.34% | 2 | 5,227 | 2.01% | 0 | | | |
| 1973 | 9,951 | 4.02% | 0 | 117,052 | 47.32% | 8 | | | | 60,522 | 24.47% | 4 | 17,889 | 7.23% | 1 | 34,442 | 13.92% | 2 | 6,510 | 2.63% | 0 | | | |
| 1970 | 8,607 | 3.59% | 0 | 118,830 | 49.52% | 8 | | | | 46,477 | 19.37% | 3 | 32,319 | 13.47% | 2 | 26,988 | 11.25% | 2 | 5,924 | 2.47% | 0 | | | |

(Excludes levelling seats. Figures in italics represent alliances/joint lists.)

=== Detailed ===
Party has received at least 4% of the vote nationally and is entitled to compete for constituency seats.

==== 2020s ====
===== 2026 =====
Results of the 2026 general election held on 13 September 2026:

| Party | | Votes per municipality | | | | | | | | | | | | | Total votes | % | Seats | | |
| Party | | Åtvida- berg | Box- holm | Fins- pång | Kinda | Lin- köping | Mjölby | Motala | Norr- köping | Ödes- hög | Söder- köping | Vad- stena | Valdem- arsvik | Ydre | Total votes | % | Con. | Lev. | Tot. |
|---|---|---|---|---|---|---|---|---|---|---|---|---|---|---|---|---|---|---|---|
| Swedish Social Democratic Party | S | 2,395 | 1,127 | 4,450 | 1,737 | 31,535 | 5,347 | 8,902 | 26,296 | 838 | 2,265 | 1,448 | 1,366 | 561 | 88,267 | 28.36% | 4 | 0 | 4 |
| Moderate Party | M | 1,494 | 610 | 2,270 | 1,310 | 24,255 | 4,130 | 5,481 | 18,931 | 718 | 2,156 | 1,203 | 936 | 462 | 63,956 | 20.55% | 3 | 0 | 3 |
| Sweden Democrats | SD | 1,821 | 893 | 3,321 | 1,491 | 15,402 | 4,174 | 6,187 | 18,061 | 814 | 2,485 | 944 | 1,348 | 555 | 57,496 | 18.48% | 2 | 1 | 3 |
| Left Party | V | 308 | 206 | 888 | 298 | 8,893 | 975 | 1,627 | 7,673 | 127 | 348 | 282 | 243 | 89 | 21,957 | 7.06% | 1 | 0 | 1 |
| Centre Party | C | 483 | 260 | 696 | 583 | 9,888 | 1,051 | 1,488 | 4,713 | 211 | 777 | 386 | 355 | 322 | 21,213 | 6.82% | 1 | 0 | 1 |
| Christian Democrats | KD | 566 | 254 | 884 | 533 | 6,962 | 1,274 | 1,750 | 5,993 | 448 | 803 | 374 | 411 | 287 | 20,539 | 6.60% | 1 | 0 | 1 |
| Green Party | MP | 275 | 130 | 524 | 375 | 8,471 | 666 | 930 | 4,844 | 161 | 498 | 375 | 128 | 133 | 17,510 | 5.63% | 1 | 0 | 1 |
| Liberals | L | 323 | 163 | 584 | 288 | 6,155 | 916 | 1,322 | 4,245 | 130 | 549 | 281 | 245 | 107 | 15,308 | 4.92% | 1 | 0 | 1 |
| Örebro Party | ÖP | 65 | 24 | 89 | 41 | 426 | 148 | 258 | 640 | 29 | 64 | 31 | 30 | 15 | 1,860 | 0.60% | 0 | 0 | 0 |
| Alternative for Sweden | AfS | 27 | 35 | 49 | 24 | 404 | 82 | 120 | 344 | 12 | 39 | 18 | 23 | 8 | 1,185 | 0.38% | 0 | 0 | 0 |
| Christian Values Party | KrVP | 12 | 4 | 13 | 7 | 182 | 17 | 41 | 128 | 4 | 11 | 7 | 7 | 9 | 442 | 0.14% | 0 | 0 | 0 |
| Pirate Party | PP | 4 | 1 | 5 | 6 | 274 | 7 | 21 | 64 | 5 | 5 | 5 | 2 | 1 | 400 | 0.13% | 0 | 0 | 0 |
| Ambition Sweden | AS | 11 | 5 | 18 | 12 | 88 | 12 | 30 | 100 | 12 | 11 | 8 | 8 | 6 | 321 | 0.10% | 0 | 0 | 0 |
| Human Rights and Democracy | MoD | 1 | 2 | 5 | 2 | 43 | 9 | 5 | 87 | 2 | 7 | 7 | 1 | 3 | 174 | 0.06% | 0 | 0 | 0 |
| Citizens' Coalition | MED | 1 | 4 | 7 | 2 | 83 | 0 | 8 | 51 | 2 | 2 | 2 | 3 | 3 | 168 | 0.05% | 0 | 0 | 0 |
| United Voice | ER | 0 | 0 | 0 | 0 | 66 | 3 | 0 | 27 | 0 | 4 | 0 | 0 | 0 | 100 | 0.03% | 0 | 0 | 0 |
| Communist Party of Sweden | SKP | 0 | 0 | 3 | 1 | 34 | 5 | 12 | 18 | 0 | 1 | 0 | 1 | 1 | 76 | 0.02% | 0 | 0 | 0 |
| Direct Democrats | DD | 1 | 0 | 1 | 1 | 26 | 1 | 4 | 12 | 0 | 3 | 3 | 0 | 0 | 52 | 0.02% | 0 | 0 | 0 |
| Independent Rural Party | LPo | 0 | 1 | 0 | 28 | 4 | 1 | 0 | 4 | 1 | 0 | 1 | 6 | 0 | 46 | 0.01% | 0 | 0 | 0 |
| Classical Liberal Party | KLP | 0 | 0 | 1 | 0 | 1 | 0 | 0 | 19 | 0 | 0 | 0 | 0 | 0 | 21 | 0.01% | 0 | 0 | 0 |
| Nordic Resistance Movement | NMR | 2 | 0 | 1 | 0 | 2 | 0 | 1 | 4 | 1 | 0 | 0 | 2 | 0 | 13 | 0.00% | 0 | 0 | 0 |
| Tidö | | 0 | 0 | 0 | 0 | 5 | 0 | 0 | 8 | 0 | 0 | 0 | 0 | 0 | 13 | 0.00% | 0 | 0 | 0 |
| RegleraAI.nu | | 0 | 0 | 0 | 0 | 4 | 3 | 1 | 2 | 0 | 1 | 0 | 0 | 0 | 11 | 0.00% | 0 | 0 | 0 |
| Unity | ENH | 1 | 0 | 1 | 0 | 2 | 0 | 0 | 6 | 0 | 0 | 1 | 0 | 0 | 11 | 0.00% | 0 | 0 | 0 |
| Volt Sweden | Volt | 0 | 0 | 0 | 0 | 4 | 1 | 0 | 5 | 0 | 1 | 0 | 0 | 0 | 11 | 0.00% | 0 | 0 | 0 |
| Turning Point Party | PV | 0 | 0 | 0 | 0 | 5 | 0 | 0 | 5 | 0 | 0 | 0 | 0 | 0 | 10 | 0.00% | 0 | 0 | 0 |
| Nuance Party | PNy | 0 | 0 | 1 | 0 | 4 | 0 | 0 | 0 | 0 | 0 | 0 | 0 | 0 | 5 | 0.00% | 0 | 0 | 0 |
| United Sweden | | 0 | 0 | 0 | 0 | 1 | 1 | 0 | 3 | 0 | 0 | 0 | 0 | 0 | 5 | 0.00% | 0 | 0 | 0 |
| Communist Party | K | 0 | 0 | 0 | 0 | 0 | 3 | 0 | 0 | 0 | 1 | 0 | 0 | 0 | 4 | 0.00% | 0 | 0 | 0 |
| Donald Duck Party | | 0 | 0 | 0 | 0 | 1 | 0 | 2 | 0 | 0 | 0 | 1 | 0 | 0 | 4 | 0.00% | 0 | 0 | 0 |
| Pax | | 0 | 0 | 1 | 0 | 2 | 0 | 1 | 0 | 0 | 0 | 0 | 0 | 0 | 4 | 0.00% | 0 | 0 | 0 |
| The Push Buttons | Kn | 0 | 0 | 1 | 0 | 1 | 0 | 0 | 2 | 0 | 0 | 0 | 0 | 0 | 4 | 0.00% | 0 | 0 | 0 |
| A Good Sweden | | 0 | 0 | 0 | 0 | 1 | 0 | 0 | 2 | 0 | 0 | 0 | 0 | 0 | 3 | 0.00% | 0 | 0 | 0 |
| 99 Black Balloons | | 0 | 0 | 0 | 0 | 1 | 0 | 0 | 1 | 0 | 0 | 0 | 0 | 0 | 2 | 0.00% | 0 | 0 | 0 |
| Jesus | | 0 | 0 | 0 | 0 | 1 | 0 | 0 | 1 | 0 | 0 | 0 | 0 | 0 | 2 | 0.00% | 0 | 0 | 0 |
| Sweden's Intellectual Democrats | | 0 | 0 | 0 | 0 | 2 | 0 | 0 | 0 | 0 | 0 | 0 | 0 | 0 | 2 | 0.00% | 0 | 0 | 0 |
| Animal Lovers' Party | | 0 | 0 | 0 | 0 | 1 | 0 | 0 | 0 | 0 | 0 | 0 | 0 | 0 | 1 | 0.00% | 0 | 0 | 0 |
| Common Sense in Sweden | CSIS | 0 | 0 | 0 | 0 | 0 | 0 | 1 | 0 | 0 | 0 | 0 | 0 | 0 | 1 | 0.00% | 0 | 0 | 0 |
| Conservative Party | | 0 | 0 | 0 | 0 | 1 | 0 | 0 | 0 | 0 | 0 | 0 | 0 | 0 | 1 | 0.00% | 0 | 0 | 0 |
| Electoral Cooperation Party | | 0 | 0 | 0 | 0 | 1 | 0 | 0 | 0 | 0 | 0 | 0 | 0 | 0 | 1 | 0.00% | 0 | 0 | 0 |
| Faith in the Future | FT | 0 | 0 | 0 | 0 | 0 | 0 | 0 | 1 | 0 | 0 | 0 | 0 | 0 | 1 | 0.00% | 0 | 0 | 0 |
| Jonathan Hemph | | 0 | 0 | 0 | 0 | 1 | 0 | 0 | 0 | 0 | 0 | 0 | 0 | 0 | 1 | 0.00% | 0 | 0 | 0 |
| Knowledge-Democratic Party | | 0 | 0 | 0 | 0 | 0 | 0 | 0 | 1 | 0 | 0 | 0 | 0 | 0 | 1 | 0.00% | 0 | 0 | 0 |
| Naturist Party | | 0 | 0 | 0 | 0 | 0 | 0 | 0 | 1 | 0 | 0 | 0 | 0 | 0 | 1 | 0.00% | 0 | 0 | 0 |
| NY Reform | NR | 0 | 0 | 0 | 0 | 0 | 0 | 0 | 1 | 0 | 0 | 0 | 0 | 0 | 1 | 0.00% | 0 | 0 | 0 |
| Secular Humanist Party | | 0 | 0 | 0 | 0 | 1 | 0 | 0 | 0 | 0 | 0 | 0 | 0 | 0 | 1 | 0.00% | 0 | 0 | 0 |
| Viking | | 0 | 0 | 0 | 0 | 0 | 0 | 0 | 1 | 0 | 0 | 0 | 0 | 0 | 1 | 0.00% | 0 | 0 | 0 |
| Vision Party | | 0 | 0 | 0 | 0 | 0 | 0 | 0 | 1 | 0 | 0 | 0 | 0 | 0 | 1 | 0.00% | 0 | 0 | 0 |
| Valid votes | | 7,790 | 3,719 | 13,813 | 6,739 | 113,233 | 18,826 | 28,192 | 92,295 | 3,515 | 10,031 | 5,377 | 5,115 | 2,562 | 311,207 | 100.00% | 14 | 1 | 15 |
| Blank votes | | 96 | 51 | 157 | 74 | 872 | 202 | 269 | 821 | 31 | 92 | 61 | 60 | 17 | 2,803 | 0.89% | | | |
| Rejected votes – unregistered parties | | 1 | 0 | 1 | 1 | 20 | 2 | 2 | 14 | 1 | 0 | 0 | 1 | 1 | 44 | 0.01% | | | |
| Rejected votes – other | | 2 | 3 | 18 | 6 | 82 | 14 | 36 | 132 | 4 | 6 | 3 | 2 | 2 | 310 | 0.10% | | | |
| Total polled | | 7,889 | 3,773 | 13,989 | 6,820 | 114,207 | 19,044 | 28,499 | 93,262 | 3,551 | 10,129 | 5,441 | 5,178 | 2,582 | 314,364 | 85.61% | | | |
| Registered electors | | 9,088 | 4,288 | 16,587 | 7,769 | 130,944 | 22,048 | 33,713 | 111,995 | 4,118 | 11,471 | 6,176 | 6,140 | 2,879 | 367,216 | | | | |
| Turnout | | 86.81% | 87.99% | 84.34% | 87.78% | 87.22% | 86.38% | 84.53% | 83.27% | 86.23% | 88.30% | 88.10% | 84.33% | 89.68% | 85.61% | | | | |

The following candidates were elected:

- Constituency seats (personal mandates) - Muharrem Demirok (C), 1,380 votes; Rebecka Le Moine (MP), 1,439 votes; Andreas Norlén (M), 5,731 votes;
- Constituency seats (party mandates) - Elias Aguirre (S), 887 votes; Johan Andersson (S), 896 votes; Jonas Andersson (SD), 128 votes; Clara Aranda (SD), 257 votes; Teresa Carvalho (S), 3,826 votes; Matilda Ekeblad (M), 678 votes; Patrik Karlson (L), 211 votes; Eva Lindh (S), 1,316 votes; Magnus Oscarsson (KD), 627 votes; Malin Östh (V), 1,090 votes; John Weinerhall (M), 553 votes;
- Levelling seats (party mandates) - Aron Emilsson (SD), 50 votes.

===== 2022 =====
Results of the 2022 general election held on 11 September 2022:

| Party | | Votes per municipality | | | | | | | | | | | | | Total votes | % | Seats | | |
| Party | | Åtvida- berg | Box- holm | Fins- pång | Kinda | Lin- köping | Mjölby | Motala | Norr- köping | Ödes- hög | Söder- köping | Vad- stena | Valdem- arsvik | Ydre | Total votes | % | Con. | Lev. | Tot. |
|---|---|---|---|---|---|---|---|---|---|---|---|---|---|---|---|---|---|---|---|
| Swedish Social Democratic Party | S | 2,734 | 1,347 | 4,965 | 2,012 | 31,997 | 5,840 | 9,611 | 26,056 | 861 | 2,450 | 1,721 | 1,576 | 667 | 91,837 | 30.55% | 4 | 1 | 5 |
| Sweden Democrats | SD | 2,025 | 999 | 3,656 | 1,712 | 16,882 | 4,496 | 6,989 | 20,093 | 952 | 2,675 | 1,080 | 1,543 | 631 | 63,733 | 21.20% | 3 | 1 | 4 |
| Moderate Party | M | 1,275 | 558 | 2,129 | 1,116 | 22,217 | 3,709 | 5,259 | 18,122 | 619 | 2,149 | 1,151 | 903 | 416 | 59,623 | 19.83% | 3 | 0 | 3 |
| Centre Party | C | 484 | 222 | 673 | 541 | 8,572 | 1,056 | 1,433 | 4,509 | 277 | 715 | 369 | 339 | 289 | 19,479 | 6.48% | 1 | 0 | 1 |
| Christian Democrats | KD | 495 | 226 | 774 | 554 | 5,673 | 1,114 | 1,547 | 5,389 | 455 | 708 | 342 | 388 | 278 | 17,943 | 5.97% | 1 | 0 | 1 |
| Left Party | V | 287 | 154 | 752 | 266 | 6,333 | 731 | 1,245 | 6,068 | 98 | 410 | 247 | 218 | 75 | 16,884 | 5.62% | 1 | 0 | 1 |
| Green Party | MP | 241 | 98 | 401 | 304 | 6,722 | 518 | 762 | 3,875 | 137 | 369 | 279 | 108 | 103 | 13,917 | 4.63% | 1 | 0 | 1 |
| Liberals | L | 237 | 93 | 443 | 171 | 6,328 | 738 | 988 | 3,321 | 76 | 440 | 211 | 141 | 84 | 13,271 | 4.41% | 0 | 1 | 1 |
| Alternative for Sweden | AfS | 28 | 10 | 48 | 25 | 223 | 45 | 63 | 232 | 19 | 19 | 5 | 20 | 12 | 749 | 0.25% | 0 | 0 | 0 |
| Citizens' Coalition | MED | 5 | 9 | 27 | 6 | 355 | 23 | 36 | 132 | 5 | 16 | 7 | 5 | 4 | 630 | 0.21% | 0 | 0 | 0 |
| Nuance Party | PNy | 4 | 8 | 24 | 3 | 248 | 31 | 30 | 220 | 5 | 4 | 0 | 5 | 0 | 582 | 0.19% | 0 | 0 | 0 |
| Pirate Party | PP | 1 | 3 | 11 | 6 | 296 | 21 | 17 | 133 | 5 | 2 | 1 | 5 | 2 | 503 | 0.17% | 0 | 0 | 0 |
| Knapptryckarna | Kn | 8 | 2 | 26 | 6 | 60 | 13 | 39 | 54 | 6 | 23 | 9 | 2 | 1 | 249 | 0.08% | 0 | 0 | 0 |
| Human Rights and Democracy | MoD | 4 | 8 | 20 | 3 | 51 | 12 | 14 | 82 | 8 | 18 | 7 | 7 | 3 | 237 | 0.08% | 0 | 0 | 0 |
| Christian Values Party | KrVP | 1 | 4 | 10 | 1 | 90 | 6 | 24 | 34 | 3 | 4 | 1 | 3 | 5 | 186 | 0.06% | 0 | 0 | 0 |
| Independent Rural Party | LPo | 5 | 2 | 15 | 45 | 21 | 1 | 9 | 56 | 3 | 11 | 1 | 15 | 2 | 186 | 0.06% | 0 | 0 | 0 |
| Feminist Initiative | FI | 3 | 1 | 7 | 1 | 43 | 5 | 9 | 38 | 1 | 3 | 1 | 0 | 0 | 112 | 0.04% | 0 | 0 | 0 |
| Climate Alliance | KA | 1 | 0 | 4 | 1 | 39 | 3 | 6 | 29 | 1 | 3 | 0 | 3 | 1 | 91 | 0.03% | 0 | 0 | 0 |
| Unity | ENH | 2 | 1 | 5 | 3 | 22 | 5 | 11 | 32 | 2 | 2 | 1 | 1 | 1 | 88 | 0.03% | 0 | 0 | 0 |
| Direct Democrats | DD | 1 | 0 | 0 | 1 | 40 | 4 | 6 | 27 | 0 | 1 | 1 | 1 | 0 | 82 | 0.03% | 0 | 0 | 0 |
| Socialist Welfare Party | S-V | 0 | 0 | 1 | 0 | 4 | 0 | 0 | 45 | 0 | 2 | 0 | 0 | 0 | 52 | 0.02% | 0 | 0 | 0 |
| United Democratic Party | | 0 | 0 | 0 | 0 | 0 | 0 | 0 | 42 | 0 | 0 | 0 | 0 | 0 | 42 | 0.01% | 0 | 0 | 0 |
| Nordic Resistance Movement | NMR | 0 | 2 | 4 | 0 | 7 | 2 | 3 | 7 | 2 | 0 | 0 | 1 | 0 | 28 | 0.01% | 0 | 0 | 0 |
| Communist Party of Sweden | SKP | 1 | 1 | 2 | 0 | 6 | 0 | 1 | 9 | 0 | 1 | 0 | 0 | 0 | 21 | 0.01% | 0 | 0 | 0 |
| Turning Point Party | PV | 0 | 0 | 0 | 0 | 12 | 0 | 0 | 3 | 0 | 0 | 0 | 1 | 0 | 16 | 0.01% | 0 | 0 | 0 |
| Classical Liberal Party | KLP | 1 | 0 | 2 | 0 | 8 | 0 | 0 | 4 | 0 | 0 | 0 | 0 | 0 | 15 | 0.00% | 0 | 0 | 0 |
| Basic Income Party | BASIP | 2 | 0 | 0 | 0 | 4 | 2 | 1 | 3 | 0 | 0 | 0 | 0 | 0 | 12 | 0.00% | 0 | 0 | 0 |
| Donald Duck Party | | 0 | 0 | 0 | 1 | 3 | 0 | 1 | 2 | 0 | 0 | 0 | 0 | 0 | 7 | 0.00% | 0 | 0 | 0 |
| Sweden Out of the EU/ Free Justice Party | | 4 | 1 | 0 | 0 | 0 | 0 | 0 | 0 | 0 | 0 | 0 | 0 | 0 | 5 | 0.00% | 0 | 0 | 0 |
| Hard Line Sweden | | 0 | 0 | 0 | 0 | 2 | 1 | 0 | 1 | 0 | 0 | 0 | 0 | 0 | 4 | 0.00% | 0 | 0 | 0 |
| Volt Sweden | Volt | 3 | 0 | 0 | 0 | 1 | 0 | 0 | 0 | 0 | 0 | 0 | 0 | 0 | 4 | 0.00% | 0 | 0 | 0 |
| Freedom Party | | 0 | 0 | 0 | 0 | 1 | 1 | 0 | 1 | 0 | 0 | 0 | 0 | 0 | 3 | 0.00% | 0 | 0 | 0 |
| Bjorn Party | | 0 | 0 | 0 | 0 | 0 | 1 | 0 | 1 | 0 | 0 | 0 | 0 | 0 | 2 | 0.00% | 0 | 0 | 0 |
| Common Sense in Sweden | CSIS | 0 | 0 | 0 | 0 | 1 | 0 | 0 | 0 | 0 | 0 | 0 | 0 | 0 | 1 | 0.00% | 0 | 0 | 0 |
| Evil Chicken Party | OKP | 0 | 0 | 0 | 0 | 1 | 0 | 0 | 0 | 0 | 0 | 0 | 0 | 0 | 1 | 0.00% | 0 | 0 | 0 |
| Freedom Movement | | 0 | 0 | 0 | 0 | 1 | 0 | 0 | 0 | 0 | 0 | 0 | 0 | 0 | 1 | 0.00% | 0 | 0 | 0 |
| Love | | 0 | 0 | 0 | 0 | 0 | 0 | 0 | 0 | 0 | 1 | 0 | 0 | 0 | 1 | 0.00% | 0 | 0 | 0 |
| Swexit Party | | 0 | 0 | 0 | 0 | 1 | 0 | 0 | 0 | 0 | 0 | 0 | 0 | 0 | 1 | 0.00% | 0 | 0 | 0 |
| The Anarchists | | 0 | 0 | 0 | 0 | 0 | 0 | 0 | 1 | 0 | 0 | 0 | 0 | 0 | 1 | 0.00% | 0 | 0 | 0 |
| The Least Bad Party | | 0 | 0 | 0 | 0 | 0 | 0 | 0 | 1 | 0 | 0 | 0 | 0 | 0 | 1 | 0.00% | 0 | 0 | 0 |
| Valid votes | | 7,852 | 3,749 | 13,999 | 6,778 | 106,264 | 18,378 | 28,104 | 88,622 | 3,535 | 10,026 | 5,434 | 5,285 | 2,574 | 300,600 | 100.00% | 14 | 3 | 17 |
| Blank votes | | 106 | 36 | 204 | 58 | 915 | 198 | 319 | 917 | 41 | 99 | 54 | 48 | 25 | 3,020 | 0.99% | | | |
| Rejected votes – unregistered parties | | 2 | 0 | 2 | 0 | 14 | 2 | 8 | 21 | 0 | 1 | 0 | 0 | 1 | 51 | 0.02% | | | |
| Rejected votes – other | | 2 | 4 | 9 | 4 | 68 | 12 | 18 | 95 | 1 | 12 | 5 | 4 | 1 | 235 | 0.08% | | | |
| Total polled | | 7,962 | 3,789 | 14,214 | 6,840 | 107,261 | 18,590 | 28,449 | 89,655 | 3,577 | 10,138 | 5,493 | 5,337 | 2,601 | 303,906 | 85.32% | | | |
| Registered electors | | 9,075 | 4,307 | 16,657 | 7,765 | 124,369 | 21,414 | 33,347 | 108,530 | 4,109 | 11,419 | 6,185 | 6,130 | 2,903 | 356,210 | | | | |
| Turnout | | 87.74% | 87.97% | 85.33% | 88.09% | 86.24% | 86.81% | 85.31% | 82.61% | 87.05% | 88.78% | 88.81% | 87.06% | 89.60% | 85.32% | | | | |

The following candidates were elected:

- Constituency seats (personal mandates) - Muharrem Demirok (C), 1,158 votes; Rebecka Le Moine (MP), 1,199 votes; Andreas Norlén (M), 5,208 votes; and Linda Westerlund Snecker (V), 1,188 votes.
- Constituency seats (party mandates) - Johan Andersson (S), 1,761 votes; Jonas Andersson (SD), 151 votes; Clara Aranda (SD), 232 votes; Teresa Carvalho (S), 2,521 votes; Eva Lindh (S), 819 votes; Johan Löfstrand (S), 857 votes; Magnus Oscarsson (KD), 883 votes; Sven-Olof Sällström (SD), 1 vote; John Weinerhall (M), 500 votes; and John Widegren (M), 727 votes.
- Levelling seats (personal mandates) - Juno Blom (L), 740 votes.
- Levelling seats (party mandates) - Aron Emilsson (SD), 40 votes; and Mattias Ottosson (S), 606 votes.

Permanent substitutions:

- Juno Blom (L) resigned on 1 March 2024 and was replaced by Patrik Karlson (L) on the same day.
- Sven-Olof Sällström (SD) died on 14 March 2024 and was replaced by Göran Hargestam (SD) on 14 March 2024.
- Linda Westerlund Snecker (V) resigned on 8 September 2024 and was replaced by Malin Östh (V) on 9 September 2024.
- Göran Hargestam (SD) resigned on 8 December 2025 and was replaced by Chris Dahlqvist (SD) on the same day.

==== 2010s ====
===== 2018 =====
Results of the 2018 general election held on 9 September 2018:

| Party | | Votes per municipality | | | | | | | | | | | | | Total votes | % | Seats | | |
| Party | | Åtvida- berg | Box- holm | Fins- pång | Kinda | Lin- köping | Mjölby | Motala | Norr- köping | Ödes- hög | Söder- köping | Vad- stena | Valdem- arsvik | Ydre | Total votes | % | Con. | Lev. | Tot. |
|---|---|---|---|---|---|---|---|---|---|---|---|---|---|---|---|---|---|---|---|
| Swedish Social Democratic Party | S | 2,678 | 1,396 | 5,239 | 1,831 | 29,108 | 5,743 | 9,295 | 25,235 | 928 | 2,232 | 1,549 | 1,618 | 598 | 87,450 | 29.07% | 4 | 1 | 5 |
| Moderate Party | M | 1,327 | 557 | 2,162 | 1,125 | 23,444 | 3,674 | 5,550 | 18,220 | 592 | 2,158 | 1,200 | 931 | 414 | 61,354 | 20.40% | 3 | 0 | 3 |
| Sweden Democrats | SD | 1,705 | 729 | 2,928 | 1,373 | 13,918 | 3,517 | 5,781 | 17,459 | 742 | 2,179 | 898 | 1,252 | 536 | 53,017 | 17.63% | 3 | 0 | 3 |
| Centre Party | C | 778 | 354 | 923 | 812 | 10,194 | 1,480 | 1,933 | 5,784 | 365 | 1,086 | 493 | 570 | 390 | 25,162 | 8.37% | 1 | 0 | 1 |
| Left Party | V | 400 | 183 | 1,061 | 396 | 6,795 | 1,029 | 1,806 | 7,237 | 147 | 550 | 315 | 290 | 143 | 20,352 | 6.77% | 1 | 0 | 1 |
| Christian Democrats | KD | 475 | 214 | 895 | 532 | 6,862 | 1,161 | 1,772 | 5,736 | 536 | 780 | 391 | 387 | 324 | 20,065 | 6.67% | 1 | 0 | 1 |
| Liberals | L | 324 | 101 | 492 | 238 | 7,562 | 803 | 1,260 | 4,286 | 82 | 495 | 199 | 145 | 95 | 16,082 | 5.35% | 1 | 0 | 1 |
| Green Party | MP | 230 | 93 | 354 | 250 | 5,963 | 512 | 760 | 3,597 | 92 | 348 | 209 | 109 | 78 | 12,595 | 4.19% | 0 | 1 | 1 |
| Feminist Initiative | FI | 23 | 12 | 47 | 14 | 461 | 51 | 89 | 418 | 23 | 23 | 29 | 8 | 12 | 1,210 | 0.40% | 0 | 0 | 0 |
| Alternative for Sweden | AfS | 16 | 12 | 51 | 11 | 341 | 46 | 56 | 283 | 19 | 25 | 14 | 11 | 5 | 890 | 0.30% | 0 | 0 | 0 |
| Citizens' Coalition | MED | 12 | 4 | 32 | 3 | 357 | 27 | 37 | 187 | 2 | 14 | 4 | 8 | 2 | 689 | 0.23% | 0 | 0 | 0 |
| Independent Rural Party | LPo | 24 | 9 | 25 | 45 | 48 | 13 | 25 | 121 | 4 | 25 | 5 | 26 | 11 | 381 | 0.13% | 0 | 0 | 0 |
| Pirate Party | PP | 5 | 8 | 13 | 10 | 187 | 9 | 10 | 88 | 3 | 5 | 5 | 6 | 3 | 352 | 0.12% | 0 | 0 | 0 |
| Direct Democrats | DD | 3 | 7 | 10 | 4 | 144 | 11 | 10 | 72 | 3 | 7 | 3 | 2 | 0 | 276 | 0.09% | 0 | 0 | 0 |
| Unity | ENH | 6 | 9 | 9 | 13 | 54 | 9 | 15 | 77 | 8 | 16 | 4 | 4 | 3 | 227 | 0.08% | 0 | 0 | 0 |
| Animal Party | DjuP | 0 | 2 | 20 | 2 | 72 | 13 | 8 | 66 | 2 | 2 | 3 | 2 | 0 | 192 | 0.06% | 0 | 0 | 0 |
| Christian Values Party | KrVP | 1 | 0 | 8 | 0 | 38 | 7 | 2 | 46 | 0 | 2 | 3 | 4 | 1 | 112 | 0.04% | 0 | 0 | 0 |
| Classical Liberal Party | KLP | 1 | 0 | 5 | 1 | 48 | 3 | 3 | 45 | 1 | 1 | 0 | 0 | 0 | 108 | 0.04% | 0 | 0 | 0 |
| Nordic Resistance Movement | NMR | 3 | 1 | 4 | 1 | 18 | 5 | 13 | 31 | 1 | 1 | 1 | 2 | 1 | 82 | 0.03% | 0 | 0 | 0 |
| Security Party | | 0 | 0 | 2 | 0 | 28 | 2 | 16 | 19 | 4 | 2 | 1 | 2 | 0 | 76 | 0.03% | 0 | 0 | 0 |
| Basic Income Party | BASIP | 2 | 13 | 2 | 2 | 6 | 2 | 4 | 13 | 0 | 2 | 1 | 0 | 0 | 47 | 0.02% | 0 | 0 | 0 |
| Communist Party of Sweden | SKP | 0 | 0 | 0 | 0 | 3 | 0 | 0 | 12 | 0 | 0 | 0 | 0 | 0 | 15 | 0.00% | 0 | 0 | 0 |
| Initiative | INI | 0 | 0 | 0 | 1 | 5 | 1 | 1 | 3 | 0 | 2 | 0 | 1 | 0 | 14 | 0.00% | 0 | 0 | 0 |
| Common Sense in Sweden | CSIS | 0 | 0 | 1 | 0 | 0 | 0 | 0 | 0 | 0 | 0 | 0 | 0 | 0 | 1 | 0.00% | 0 | 0 | 0 |
| European Workers Party | EAP | 0 | 1 | 0 | 0 | 0 | 0 | 0 | 0 | 0 | 0 | 0 | 0 | 0 | 1 | 0.00% | 0 | 0 | 0 |
| NY Reform | | 0 | 0 | 0 | 0 | 0 | 0 | 0 | 1 | 0 | 0 | 0 | 0 | 0 | 1 | 0.00% | 0 | 0 | 0 |
| Parties not on the ballot | | 0 | 0 | 2 | 0 | 8 | 1 | 4 | 9 | 2 | 0 | 0 | 1 | 0 | 27 | 0.01% | 0 | 0 | 0 |
| Valid votes | | 8,013 | 3,705 | 14,285 | 6,664 | 105,664 | 18,119 | 28,450 | 89,045 | 3,556 | 9,955 | 5,327 | 5,379 | 2,616 | 300,778 | 100.00% | 14 | 2 | 16 |
| Blank votes | | 84 | 46 | 147 | 68 | 791 | 196 | 301 | 739 | 25 | 91 | 40 | 62 | 12 | 2,602 | 0.86% | | | |
| Rejected votes – unregistered parties | | 2 | 1 | 6 | 0 | 32 | 3 | 7 | 28 | 0 | 0 | 5 | 1 | 1 | 86 | 0.03% | | | |
| Rejected votes – other | | 2 | 0 | 7 | 2 | 47 | 8 | 17 | 48 | 1 | 5 | 3 | 1 | 0 | 141 | 0.05% | | | |
| Total polled | | 8,101 | 3,752 | 14,445 | 6,734 | 106,534 | 18,326 | 28,775 | 89,860 | 3,582 | 10,051 | 5,375 | 5,443 | 2,629 | 303,607 | 88.16% | | | |
| Registered electors | | 9,074 | 4,212 | 16,450 | 7,556 | 119,438 | 20,677 | 32,611 | 104,100 | 4,031 | 11,183 | 6,026 | 6,157 | 2,881 | 344,396 | | | | |
| Turnout | | 89.28% | 89.08% | 87.81% | 89.12% | 89.20% | 88.63% | 88.24% | 86.32% | 88.86% | 89.88% | 89.20% | 88.40% | 91.25% | 88.16% | | | | |

The following candidates were elected:

- Constituency seats (personal mandates) - Juno Blom (L), 1,350 votes; Andreas Norlén (M), 3,154 votes; Magnus Oscarsson (KD), 1,233 votes; and Linda Westerlund Snecker (V), 1,232 votes.
- Constituency seats (party mandates) - Johan Andersson (S), 2,110 votes; Jonas Andersson (SD), 132 votes; Teresa Carvalho (S), 2,911 votes; Magnus Ek (C), 1,135 votes; Jörgen Grubb (SD); Eva Lindh (S), 1,235 votes; Johan Löfstrand (S), 1,482 votes; Betty Malmberg (M), 317 votes; John Weinerhall (M), 592 votes; and Markus Wiechel (SD), 52 votes.
- Levelling seats (personal mandates) - Rebecka Le Moine (MP), 1,063 votes.
- Levelling seats (party mandates) - Mattias Ottosson (S), 786 votes.

===== 2014 =====
Results of the 2014 general election held on 14 September 2014:

| Party | | Votes per municipality | | | | | | | | | | | | | Total votes | % | Seats | | |
| Party | | Åtvida- berg | Box- holm | Fins- pång | Kinda | Lin- köping | Mjölby | Motala | Norr- köping | Ödes- hög | Söder- köping | Vad- stena | Valdem- arsvik | Ydre | Total votes | % | Con. | Lev. | Tot. |
|---|---|---|---|---|---|---|---|---|---|---|---|---|---|---|---|---|---|---|---|
| Swedish Social Democratic Party | S | 3,129 | 1,626 | 6,029 | 2,119 | 29,210 | 6,685 | 11,268 | 26,680 | 1,113 | 2,651 | 1,752 | 1,900 | 747 | 94,909 | 32.56% | 5 | 0 | 5 |
| Moderate Party | M | 1,446 | 545 | 2,247 | 1,285 | 24,281 | 3,726 | 5,285 | 19,995 | 652 | 2,555 | 1,332 | 1,075 | 453 | 64,877 | 22.26% | 3 | 0 | 3 |
| Sweden Democrats | SD | 1,354 | 576 | 2,146 | 1,113 | 11,214 | 2,644 | 4,601 | 14,045 | 615 | 1,624 | 657 | 997 | 367 | 41,953 | 14.39% | 2 | 0 | 2 |
| Green Party | MP | 353 | 156 | 642 | 331 | 8,268 | 770 | 1,377 | 5,963 | 174 | 571 | 326 | 177 | 110 | 19,218 | 6.59% | 1 | 0 | 1 |
| Centre Party | C | 623 | 305 | 714 | 698 | 6,157 | 1,135 | 1,423 | 3,856 | 332 | 856 | 357 | 565 | 422 | 17,443 | 5.98% | 1 | 0 | 1 |
| Liberal People's Party | FP | 220 | 101 | 461 | 211 | 6,988 | 756 | 1,257 | 3,912 | 94 | 425 | 198 | 149 | 88 | 14,860 | 5.10% | 1 | 0 | 1 |
| Christian Democrats | KD | 300 | 164 | 635 | 420 | 5,790 | 846 | 1,069 | 3,937 | 354 | 494 | 305 | 190 | 248 | 14,752 | 5.06% | 1 | 0 | 1 |
| Left Party | V | 304 | 158 | 734 | 306 | 4,709 | 771 | 1,366 | 4,706 | 106 | 372 | 198 | 198 | 83 | 14,011 | 4.81% | 0 | 1 | 1 |
| Feminist Initiative | FI | 96 | 33 | 252 | 121 | 2,599 | 258 | 400 | 2,317 | 68 | 182 | 117 | 66 | 36 | 6,545 | 2.25% | 0 | 0 | 0 |
| Pirate Party | PP | 19 | 6 | 43 | 17 | 719 | 48 | 80 | 438 | 5 | 42 | 12 | 9 | 2 | 1,440 | 0.49% | 0 | 0 | 0 |
| Unity | ENH | 10 | 4 | 16 | 15 | 69 | 15 | 24 | 118 | 9 | 18 | 6 | 9 | 3 | 316 | 0.11% | 0 | 0 | 0 |
| Independent Rural Party | LPo | 8 | 4 | 16 | 41 | 42 | 16 | 22 | 35 | 4 | 17 | 1 | 33 | 6 | 245 | 0.08% | 0 | 0 | 0 |
| Animal Party | DjuP | 0 | 2 | 19 | 1 | 52 | 7 | 24 | 69 | 2 | 4 | 2 | 3 | 0 | 185 | 0.06% | 0 | 0 | 0 |
| Swedish Senior Citizen Interest Party | SPI | 2 | 1 | 0 | 0 | 35 | 40 | 71 | 28 | 0 | 0 | 6 | 0 | 0 | 183 | 0.06% | 0 | 0 | 0 |
| Christian Values Party | KrVP | 2 | 0 | 4 | 2 | 58 | 1 | 7 | 57 | 0 | 6 | 2 | 2 | 0 | 141 | 0.05% | 0 | 0 | 0 |
| Party of the Swedes | SVP | 0 | 0 | 3 | 1 | 50 | 2 | 23 | 34 | 6 | 4 | 2 | 2 | 0 | 127 | 0.04% | 0 | 0 | 0 |
| Direct Democrats | DD | 0 | 4 | 2 | 0 | 40 | 1 | 7 | 11 | 1 | 0 | 1 | 1 | 0 | 68 | 0.02% | 0 | 0 | 0 |
| Classical Liberal Party | KLP | 1 | 1 | 0 | 0 | 43 | 3 | 3 | 9 | 0 | 2 | 0 | 0 | 0 | 62 | 0.02% | 0 | 0 | 0 |
| Communist Party of Sweden | SKP | 0 | 0 | 3 | 0 | 6 | 1 | 1 | 3 | 0 | 0 | 0 | 0 | 0 | 14 | 0.00% | 0 | 0 | 0 |
| Progressive Party | | 0 | 0 | 0 | 0 | 0 | 1 | 9 | 0 | 0 | 0 | 1 | 0 | 0 | 11 | 0.00% | 0 | 0 | 0 |
| Socialist Justice Party | RS | 0 | 0 | 0 | 0 | 1 | 0 | 0 | 8 | 0 | 0 | 1 | 0 | 0 | 10 | 0.00% | 0 | 0 | 0 |
| Health Party | | 3 | 0 | 0 | 0 | 1 | 0 | 0 | 2 | 0 | 0 | 0 | 1 | 0 | 7 | 0.00% | 0 | 0 | 0 |
| European Workers Party | EAP | 0 | 0 | 0 | 0 | 0 | 1 | 0 | 1 | 0 | 0 | 0 | 0 | 0 | 2 | 0.00% | 0 | 0 | 0 |
| Peace Democrats | FD | 1 | 0 | 0 | 0 | 1 | 0 | 0 | 0 | 0 | 0 | 0 | 0 | 0 | 2 | 0.00% | 0 | 0 | 0 |
| Parties not on the ballot | | 1 | 1 | 5 | 1 | 39 | 5 | 10 | 34 | 1 | 3 | 1 | 1 | 1 | 103 | 0.04% | 0 | 0 | 0 |
| Valid votes | | 7,872 | 3,687 | 13,971 | 6,682 | 100,372 | 17,732 | 28,327 | 86,258 | 3,536 | 9,826 | 5,277 | 5,378 | 2,566 | 291,484 | 100.00% | 14 | 1 | 15 |
| Blank votes | | 100 | 33 | 168 | 58 | 1,046 | 218 | 298 | 844 | 33 | 80 | 58 | 55 | 23 | 3,014 | 1.02% | | | |
| Rejected votes – other | | 1 | 0 | 3 | 1 | 41 | 5 | 8 | 21 | 0 | 3 | 2 | 0 | 0 | 85 | 0.03% | | | |
| Total polled | | 7,973 | 3,720 | 14,142 | 6,741 | 101,459 | 17,955 | 28,633 | 87,123 | 3,569 | 9,909 | 5,337 | 5,433 | 2,589 | 294,583 | 86.98% | | | |
| Registered electors | | 9,080 | 4,168 | 16,372 | 7,658 | 115,263 | 20,638 | 32,910 | 102,109 | 4,082 | 11,217 | 6,056 | 6,241 | 2,870 | 338,664 | | | | |
| Turnout | | 87.81% | 89.25% | 86.38% | 88.03% | 88.02% | 87.00% | 87.00% | 85.32% | 87.43% | 88.34% | 88.13% | 87.05% | 90.21% | 86.98% | | | | |

The following candidates were elected:

- Constituency seats (personal mandates) - Lena Ek (C), 1,560 votes; Magnus Oscarsson (KD), 926 votes; and Mathias Sundin (FP), 768 votes.
- Constituency seats (party mandates) - Johan Andersson (S), 2,699 votes; Finn Bengtsson (M), 1,448 votes; Teresa Carvalho (S), 3,207 votes; Runar Filper (SD), 2 votes; Annika Lillemets (MP), 821 votes; Johan Löfstrand (S), 1,437 votes; Peter Lundgren (SD), 28 votes; Betty Malmberg (M), 494 votes; Andreas Norlén (M), 2,152 votes; Mattias Ottosson (S), 871 votes; and Anna-Lena Sörenson (S), 702 votes.
- Levelling seats (personal mandates) - Linda Snecker (V), 705 votes.

Permanent substitutions:

- Peter Lundgren (SD) resigned on 29 September 2014 and was replaced by Cassandra Sundin (SD) on 30 September 2014.
- Lena Ek (C) resigned on 31 July 2015 and was replaced by Staffan Danielsson (C) on 1 August 2015.

===== 2010 =====
Results of the 2010 general election held on 19 September 2010:

| Party | | Votes per municipality | | | | | | | | | | | | | Total votes | % | Seats | | |
| Party | | Åtvida- berg | Box- holm | Fins- pång | Kinda | Lin- köping | Mjölby | Motala | Norr- köping | Ödes- hög | Söder- köping | Vad- stena | Valdem- arsvik | Ydre | Total votes | % | Con. | Lev. | Tot. |
|---|---|---|---|---|---|---|---|---|---|---|---|---|---|---|---|---|---|---|---|
| Swedish Social Democratic Party | S | 3,164 | 1,616 | 6,042 | 2,094 | 26,419 | 6,440 | 11,902 | 26,550 | 1,085 | 2,450 | 1,708 | 1,971 | 723 | 92,164 | 32.95% | 5 | 0 | 5 |
| Moderate Party | M | 1,924 | 720 | 3,048 | 1,634 | 29,359 | 4,430 | 6,645 | 24,647 | 924 | 3,143 | 1,615 | 1,396 | 656 | 80,141 | 28.65% | 4 | 0 | 4 |
| Green Party | MP | 397 | 176 | 800 | 410 | 8,966 | 980 | 1,448 | 6,478 | 205 | 663 | 341 | 235 | 126 | 21,225 | 7.59% | 1 | 0 | 1 |
| Liberal People's Party | FP | 369 | 131 | 634 | 326 | 8,439 | 1,085 | 1,726 | 4,920 | 132 | 549 | 351 | 223 | 132 | 19,017 | 6.80% | 1 | 0 | 1 |
| Centre Party | C | 630 | 323 | 771 | 864 | 6,084 | 1,161 | 1,285 | 3,806 | 335 | 933 | 324 | 635 | 410 | 17,561 | 6.28% | 1 | 0 | 1 |
| Christian Democrats | KD | 392 | 182 | 803 | 435 | 6,098 | 963 | 1,274 | 4,249 | 431 | 614 | 349 | 278 | 289 | 16,357 | 5.85% | 1 | 0 | 1 |
| Sweden Democrats | SD | 385 | 193 | 723 | 408 | 4,323 | 823 | 1,580 | 5,000 | 207 | 470 | 259 | 342 | 149 | 14,862 | 5.31% | 1 | 0 | 1 |
| Left Party | V | 335 | 204 | 839 | 309 | 4,522 | 862 | 1,520 | 4,625 | 133 | 396 | 204 | 219 | 74 | 14,242 | 5.09% | 0 | 1 | 1 |
| Pirate Party | PP | 30 | 10 | 52 | 35 | 942 | 100 | 118 | 596 | 16 | 40 | 24 | 12 | 7 | 1,982 | 0.71% | 0 | 0 | 0 |
| Swedish Senior Citizen Interest Party | SPI | 1 | 0 | 1 | 0 | 270 | 149 | 145 | 424 | 0 | 27 | 3 | 8 | 0 | 1,028 | 0.37% | 0 | 0 | 0 |
| Feminist Initiative | FI | 10 | 1 | 33 | 10 | 347 | 17 | 40 | 322 | 11 | 36 | 15 | 7 | 1 | 850 | 0.30% | 0 | 0 | 0 |
| Freedom Party | | 0 | 0 | 5 | 0 | 6 | 2 | 8 | 32 | 1 | 1 | 0 | 0 | 0 | 55 | 0.02% | 0 | 0 | 0 |
| Party of the Swedes | SVP | 0 | 0 | 0 | 0 | 7 | 1 | 39 | 5 | 0 | 1 | 0 | 0 | 0 | 53 | 0.02% | 0 | 0 | 0 |
| Unity | ENH | 2 | 0 | 3 | 0 | 6 | 4 | 1 | 13 | 0 | 8 | 2 | 3 | 0 | 42 | 0.02% | 0 | 0 | 0 |
| Classical Liberal Party | KLP | 1 | 0 | 0 | 0 | 15 | 1 | 0 | 9 | 0 | 2 | 0 | 0 | 0 | 28 | 0.01% | 0 | 0 | 0 |
| Rural Democrats | | 0 | 7 | 2 | 0 | 1 | 0 | 1 | 14 | 1 | 0 | 0 | 1 | 0 | 27 | 0.01% | 0 | 0 | 0 |
| National Democrats | ND | 0 | 0 | 2 | 0 | 8 | 1 | 1 | 14 | 0 | 0 | 0 | 0 | 0 | 26 | 0.01% | 0 | 0 | 0 |
| Spirits Party | | 0 | 0 | 0 | 2 | 4 | 0 | 1 | 4 | 0 | 1 | 0 | 0 | 0 | 12 | 0.00% | 0 | 0 | 0 |
| Communist Party of Sweden | SKP | 1 | 0 | 0 | 0 | 2 | 0 | 0 | 2 | 0 | 0 | 0 | 1 | 0 | 6 | 0.00% | 0 | 0 | 0 |
| Norrländska Coalition | NorrS | 0 | 0 | 1 | 0 | 1 | 0 | 0 | 3 | 0 | 0 | 0 | 0 | 0 | 5 | 0.00% | 0 | 0 | 0 |
| Active Democracy | | 0 | 0 | 0 | 0 | 4 | 0 | 0 | 0 | 0 | 0 | 0 | 0 | 0 | 4 | 0.00% | 0 | 0 | 0 |
| European Workers Party | EAP | 0 | 0 | 0 | 0 | 0 | 0 | 0 | 3 | 0 | 0 | 0 | 0 | 0 | 3 | 0.00% | 0 | 0 | 0 |
| Socialist Justice Party | RS | 0 | 0 | 1 | 0 | 2 | 0 | 0 | 0 | 0 | 0 | 0 | 0 | 0 | 3 | 0.00% | 0 | 0 | 0 |
| Health Care Party | Sjvåp | 0 | 0 | 0 | 0 | 0 | 0 | 0 | 1 | 0 | 0 | 0 | 0 | 0 | 1 | 0.00% | 0 | 0 | 0 |
| Parties not on the ballot | | 1 | 0 | 0 | 0 | 19 | 3 | 4 | 14 | 1 | 2 | 2 | 0 | 1 | 47 | 0.02% | 0 | 0 | 0 |
| Valid votes | | 7,642 | 3,563 | 13,760 | 6,527 | 95,844 | 17,022 | 27,738 | 81,731 | 3,482 | 9,336 | 5,197 | 5,331 | 2,568 | 279,741 | 100.00% | 14 | 1 | 15 |
| Blank votes | | 119 | 62 | 186 | 97 | 997 | 211 | 299 | 942 | 64 | 123 | 72 | 62 | 33 | 3,267 | 1.15% | | | |
| Rejected votes – other | | 2 | 0 | 7 | 0 | 37 | 11 | 12 | 43 | 2 | 1 | 3 | 4 | 1 | 123 | 0.04% | | | |
| Total polled | | 7,763 | 3,625 | 13,953 | 6,624 | 96,878 | 17,244 | 28,049 | 82,716 | 3,548 | 9,460 | 5,272 | 5,397 | 2,602 | 283,131 | 85.79% | | | |
| Registered electors | | 9,006 | 4,154 | 16,373 | 7,642 | 111,013 | 20,104 | 32,615 | 98,651 | 4,152 | 11,026 | 5,990 | 6,352 | 2,932 | 330,010 | | | | |
| Turnout | | 86.20% | 87.27% | 85.22% | 86.68% | 87.27% | 85.77% | 86.00% | 83.85% | 85.45% | 85.80% | 88.01% | 84.97% | 88.74% | 85.79% | | | | |

The following candidates were elected:

- Constituency seats (personal mandates) - Staffan Danielsson (C), 1,660 votes.
- Constituency seats (party mandates) - Thoralf Alfsson (SD), 16 votes; Johan Andersson (S), 1,741 votes; Yvonne Andersson (KD), 1,096 votes; Gunnar Axén (M), 1,369 votes; Finn Bengtsson (M), 1,351 votes; Gunilla Carlsson (M), 4,559 votes; Karin Granbom Ellison (FP), 847 votes; Billy Gustafsson (S), 630 votes; Annika Lillemets (MP), 1,057 votes; Johan Löfstrand (S), 2,410 votes; Louise Malmström (S), 2,626 votes; Andreas Norlén (M), 904 votes; and Anna-Lena Sörenson (S), 696 votes.
- Levelling seats (party mandates) - Torbjörn Björlund (V), 385 votes.

Permanent substitutions:

- Gunilla Carlsson (M) resigned on 18 September 2013 and was replaced by Betty Malmberg (M) on the same day.

==== 2000s ====
===== 2006 =====
Results of the 2006 general election held on 17 September 2006:

| Party | | Votes per municipality | | | | | | | | | | | | | Total votes | % | Seats | | |
| Party | | Åtvida- berg | Box- holm | Fins- pång | Kinda | Lin- köping | Mjölby | Motala | Norr- köping | Ödes- hög | Söder- köping | Vad- stena | Valdem- arsvik | Ydre | Total votes | % | Con. | Lev. | Tot. |
|---|---|---|---|---|---|---|---|---|---|---|---|---|---|---|---|---|---|---|---|
| Swedish Social Democratic Party | S | 3,441 | 1,686 | 6,265 | 2,383 | 29,196 | 6,813 | 11,413 | 28,252 | 1,215 | 2,744 | 1,788 | 2,094 | 772 | 98,062 | 37.40% | 5 | 1 | 6 |
| Moderate Party | M | 1,466 | 452 | 2,397 | 1,306 | 24,321 | 3,411 | 5,419 | 19,924 | 709 | 2,542 | 1,389 | 1,193 | 508 | 65,037 | 24.81% | 4 | 0 | 4 |
| Centre Party | C | 762 | 373 | 937 | 1,020 | 6,401 | 1,369 | 1,594 | 4,303 | 436 | 1,039 | 405 | 768 | 477 | 19,884 | 7.58% | 1 | 0 | 1 |
| Christian Democrats | KD | 519 | 268 | 931 | 527 | 6,805 | 1,142 | 1,530 | 4,867 | 464 | 677 | 397 | 343 | 361 | 18,831 | 7.18% | 1 | 0 | 1 |
| Liberal People's Party | FP | 311 | 97 | 622 | 230 | 7,656 | 869 | 1,575 | 4,553 | 136 | 475 | 269 | 217 | 107 | 17,117 | 6.53% | 1 | 0 | 1 |
| Left Party | V | 345 | 183 | 881 | 262 | 4,226 | 733 | 1,512 | 4,454 | 131 | 392 | 213 | 206 | 90 | 13,628 | 5.20% | 1 | 0 | 1 |
| Green Party | MP | 230 | 100 | 544 | 249 | 5,492 | 510 | 1,032 | 4,200 | 129 | 467 | 211 | 142 | 96 | 13,402 | 5.11% | 1 | 0 | 1 |
| Sweden Democrats | SD | 160 | 85 | 355 | 156 | 1,509 | 311 | 684 | 2,165 | 97 | 242 | 130 | 130 | 64 | 6,088 | 2.32% | 0 | 0 | 0 |
| Swedish Senior Citizen Interest Party | SPI | 38 | 40 | 73 | 24 | 946 | 406 | 579 | 1,352 | 31 | 77 | 77 | 38 | 1 | 3,682 | 1.40% | 0 | 0 | 0 |
| Pirate Party | PP | 43 | 12 | 59 | 41 | 932 | 126 | 208 | 515 | 13 | 52 | 16 | 13 | 8 | 2,038 | 0.78% | 0 | 0 | 0 |
| June List | | 42 | 22 | 128 | 51 | 528 | 93 | 125 | 625 | 22 | 91 | 41 | 35 | 16 | 1,819 | 0.69% | 0 | 0 | 0 |
| Feminist Initiative | FI | 28 | 14 | 60 | 23 | 682 | 61 | 109 | 425 | 13 | 31 | 27 | 12 | 2 | 1,487 | 0.57% | 0 | 0 | 0 |
| Health Care Party | Sjvåp | 15 | 1 | 22 | 5 | 49 | 18 | 33 | 142 | 5 | 24 | 0 | 7 | 1 | 322 | 0.12% | 0 | 0 | 0 |
| National Democrats | ND | 1 | 0 | 11 | 0 | 18 | 2 | 13 | 235 | 0 | 1 | 0 | 0 | 0 | 281 | 0.11% | 0 | 0 | 0 |
| Unity | ENH | 7 | 6 | 9 | 1 | 47 | 3 | 10 | 91 | 6 | 35 | 6 | 12 | 1 | 234 | 0.09% | 0 | 0 | 0 |
| National Socialist Front | | 1 | 0 | 3 | 1 | 66 | 3 | 6 | 41 | 0 | 1 | 2 | 2 | 0 | 126 | 0.05% | 0 | 0 | 0 |
| People's Will | | 0 | 1 | 1 | 0 | 9 | 3 | 4 | 18 | 0 | 0 | 1 | 0 | 1 | 38 | 0.01% | 0 | 0 | 0 |
| Classical Liberal Party | KLP | 0 | 0 | 0 | 0 | 9 | 0 | 2 | 7 | 0 | 0 | 0 | 0 | 0 | 18 | 0.01% | 0 | 0 | 0 |
| Socialist Justice Party | RS | 0 | 0 | 0 | 0 | 7 | 0 | 1 | 2 | 0 | 0 | 0 | 0 | 0 | 10 | 0.00% | 0 | 0 | 0 |
| The Communists | KOMM | 1 | 0 | 2 | 0 | 3 | 0 | 0 | 2 | 0 | 0 | 0 | 0 | 0 | 8 | 0.00% | 0 | 0 | 0 |
| New Future | NYF | 0 | 0 | 0 | 0 | 0 | 0 | 2 | 1 | 0 | 0 | 1 | 1 | 0 | 5 | 0.00% | 0 | 0 | 0 |
| Active Democracy | | 0 | 0 | 0 | 0 | 1 | 0 | 1 | 2 | 0 | 0 | 0 | 0 | 0 | 4 | 0.00% | 0 | 0 | 0 |
| Unique Party | | 0 | 0 | 0 | 0 | 1 | 0 | 1 | 0 | 0 | 0 | 0 | 0 | 0 | 2 | 0.00% | 0 | 0 | 0 |
| Kvinnokraft | | 0 | 0 | 0 | 0 | 1 | 0 | 0 | 0 | 0 | 0 | 0 | 0 | 0 | 1 | 0.00% | 0 | 0 | 0 |
| Other parties | | 1 | 0 | 1 | 0 | 15 | 0 | 6 | 19 | 0 | 0 | 0 | 1 | 1 | 44 | 0.02% | 0 | 0 | 0 |
| Valid votes | | 7,411 | 3,340 | 13,301 | 6,279 | 88,920 | 15,873 | 25,859 | 76,195 | 3,407 | 8,890 | 4,973 | 5,214 | 2,506 | 262,168 | 100.00% | 14 | 1 | 15 |
| Blank votes | | 184 | 85 | 234 | 129 | 1,668 | 388 | 602 | 1,455 | 61 | 158 | 76 | 72 | 65 | 5,177 | 1.94% | | | |
| Rejected votes – other | | 2 | 0 | 4 | 3 | 37 | 7 | 12 | 54 | 2 | 6 | 1 | 3 | 1 | 132 | 0.05% | | | |
| Total polled | | 7,597 | 3,425 | 13,539 | 6,411 | 90,625 | 16,268 | 26,473 | 77,704 | 3,470 | 9,054 | 5,050 | 5,289 | 2,572 | 267,477 | 83.35% | | | |
| Registered electors | | 9,045 | 4,070 | 16,174 | 7,611 | 106,616 | 19,552 | 32,147 | 95,334 | 4,189 | 10,767 | 5,988 | 6,409 | 3,006 | 320,908 | | | | |
| Turnout | | 83.99% | 84.15% | 83.71% | 84.23% | 85.00% | 83.20% | 82.35% | 81.51% | 82.84% | 84.09% | 84.34% | 82.52% | 85.56% | 83.35% | | | | |

The following candidates were elected:

- Constituency seats (personal mandates) - Peter Eriksson (MP), 1,215 votes.
- Constituency seats (party mandates) - Yvonne Andersson (KD), 1,301 votes; Gunnar Axén (M), 2,367 votes; Torbjörn Björlund (V), 349 votes; Gunilla Carlsson (M), 2,306 votes; Staffan Danielsson (C), 1,510 votes; Karin Granbom (FP), 780 votes; Billy Gustafsson (S), 1,245 votes; Sonia Karlsson (S), 1,595 votes; Johan Löfstrand (S), 1,696 votes; Anne Ludvigsson (S), 713 votes; Betty Malmberg (M), 414 votes; Louise Malmström (S), 2,220 votes; and Andreas Norlén (M), 1,096 votes.
- Levelling seats (party mandates) - Aleksander Gabelic (S), 581 votes.

===== 2002 =====
Results of the 2002 general election held on 15 September 2002:

| Party | | Votes per municipality | | | | | | | | | | | | | Total votes | % | Seats | | |
| Party | | Åtvida- berg | Box- holm | Fins- pång | Kinda | Lin- köping | Mjölby | Motala | Norr- köping | Ödes- hög | Söder- köping | Vad- stena | Valdem- arsvik | Ydre | Total votes | % | Con. | Lev. | Tot. |
|---|---|---|---|---|---|---|---|---|---|---|---|---|---|---|---|---|---|---|---|
| Swedish Social Democratic Party | S | 3,623 | 1,761 | 6,844 | 2,352 | 32,093 | 7,125 | 12,338 | 30,469 | 1,298 | 3,007 | 1,963 | 2,225 | 845 | 105,943 | 42.22% | 6 | 1 | 7 |
| Moderate Party | M | 810 | 244 | 1,284 | 680 | 13,410 | 1,943 | 2,693 | 12,043 | 416 | 1,620 | 806 | 711 | 267 | 36,927 | 14.72% | 2 | 1 | 3 |
| Liberal People's Party | FP | 566 | 194 | 1,097 | 494 | 12,678 | 1,516 | 2,560 | 8,371 | 202 | 874 | 493 | 396 | 213 | 29,654 | 11.82% | 2 | 0 | 2 |
| Christian Democrats | KD | 749 | 323 | 1,274 | 879 | 9,011 | 1,551 | 2,247 | 6,553 | 626 | 977 | 580 | 466 | 548 | 25,784 | 10.28% | 2 | 0 | 2 |
| Left Party | V | 497 | 249 | 1,258 | 352 | 5,891 | 1,101 | 1,896 | 5,635 | 188 | 490 | 257 | 297 | 111 | 18,222 | 7.26% | 1 | 0 | 1 |
| Centre Party | C | 717 | 377 | 762 | 997 | 4,255 | 1,227 | 1,276 | 2,725 | 476 | 886 | 329 | 793 | 434 | 15,254 | 6.08% | 1 | 0 | 1 |
| Green Party | MP | 271 | 107 | 535 | 258 | 4,514 | 518 | 1,020 | 3,682 | 156 | 458 | 230 | 174 | 123 | 12,046 | 4.80% | 1 | 0 | 1 |
| Swedish Senior Citizen Interest Party | SPI | 84 | 15 | 59 | 19 | 936 | 280 | 679 | 1,197 | 26 | 56 | 121 | 30 | 13 | 3,515 | 1.40% | 0 | 0 | 0 |
| Sweden Democrats | SD | 49 | 19 | 125 | 62 | 569 | 50 | 107 | 1,006 | 10 | 109 | 31 | 19 | 1 | 2,157 | 0.86% | 0 | 0 | 0 |
| Socialist Party | SOC.P | 0 | 0 | 0 | 1 | 240 | 1 | 1 | 6 | 1 | 0 | 0 | 0 | 2 | 252 | 0.10% | 0 | 0 | 0 |
| New Future | NYF | 0 | 1 | 0 | 0 | 15 | 14 | 0 | 70 | 4 | 21 | 1 | 0 | 2 | 128 | 0.05% | 0 | 0 | 0 |
| Socialist Justice Party | RS | 0 | 0 | 0 | 0 | 2 | 0 | 1 | 68 | 0 | 1 | 0 | 0 | 0 | 72 | 0.03% | 0 | 0 | 0 |
| Unity | ENH | 1 | 1 | 0 | 0 | 10 | 0 | 0 | 3 | 0 | 0 | 0 | 1 | 0 | 16 | 0.01% | 0 | 0 | 0 |
| Norrbotten Party | NBP | 0 | 0 | 2 | 0 | 1 | 0 | 0 | 2 | 1 | 0 | 1 | 0 | 0 | 7 | 0.00% | 0 | 0 | 0 |
| The Communists | KOMM | 0 | 0 | 1 | 0 | 0 | 0 | 0 | 0 | 0 | 0 | | 0 | 0 | 1 | 0.00% | 0 | 0 | 0 |
| Other parties | | 22 | 9 | 12 | 11 | 418 | 25 | 176 | 224 | 7 | 15 | 14 | 11 | 4 | 948 | 0.38% | 0 | 0 | 0 |
| Valid votes | | 7,389 | 3,300 | 13,253 | 6,105 | 84,043 | 15,351 | 24,994 | 72,054 | 3,411 | 8,514 | 4,826 | 5,123 | 2,563 | 250,926 | 100.00% | 15 | 2 | 17 |
| Rejected votes | | 149 | 66 | 243 | 99 | 1,638 | 284 | 427 | 1,306 | 46 | 153 | 83 | 84 | 41 | 4,619 | 1.81% | | | |
| Total polled | | 7,538 | 3,366 | 13,496 | 6,204 | 85,681 | 15,635 | 25,421 | 73,360 | 3,457 | 8,667 | 4,909 | 5,207 | 2,604 | 255,545 | 81.16% | | | |
| Registered electors | | 9,054 | 4,056 | 16,260 | 7,660 | 103,297 | 19,331 | 31,828 | 93,034 | 4,282 | 10,546 | 5,982 | 6,455 | 3,073 | 314,858 | | | | |
| Turnout | | 83.26% | 82.99% | 83.00% | 80.99% | 82.95% | 80.88% | 79.87% | 78.85% | 80.73% | 82.18% | 82.06% | 80.67% | 84.74% | 81.16% | | | | |

The following candidates were elected:

- Constituency seats (personal mandates) - Lena Ek (C), 2,220 votes.
- Constituency seats (party mandates) - Yvonne Andersson (KD), 1,682 votes; Sven Brus (KD), 1,142 votes; Britt-Marie Danestig (V), 720 votes; Linnéa Darell (FP), 1,287 votes; Karin Granbom (FP), 1,281 votes; Helena Hillar Rosenqvist (MP), 235 votes; Sonia Karlsson (S), 1,737 votes; Anna Lindgren (M), 2,424 votes; Johan Löfstrand (S), 1,105 votes; Anne Ludvigsson (S), 635 votes; Louise Malmström (S), 2,917 votes; Conny Öhman (S), 1,349 votes; Berndt Sköldestig (S), 1,890 votes; and Per Unckel (M), 2,687 votes.
- Levelling seats (party mandates) - Gunnar Axén (M), 1,248 votes; and Billy Gustafsson (S), 585 votes.

Permanent substitutions:

- Per Unckel (M) resigned on 31 December 2002 and was replaced by Stefan Hagfeldt (M) on 1 January 2003.
- Lena Ek (C) resigned on 19 July 2004 upon being elected to the European Parliament and was replaced by Staffan Danielsson (C) on 20 July 2004.
- Berndt Sköldestig (S) died on 13 April 2006 and was replaced by Britt Olauson (S) on 18 April 2006.

==== 1990s ====
===== 1998 =====
Results of the 1998 general election held on 20 September 1998:

| Party | | Votes per municipality | | | | | | | | | | | | | Total votes | % | Seats | | |
| Party | | Åtvida- berg | Box- holm | Fins- pång | Kinda | Lin- köping | Mjölby | Motala | Norr- köping | Ödes- hög | Söder- köping | Vad- stena | Valdem- arsvik | Ydre | Total votes | % | Con. | Lev. | Tot. |
|---|---|---|---|---|---|---|---|---|---|---|---|---|---|---|---|---|---|---|---|
| Swedish Social Democratic Party | S | 3,448 | 1,514 | 6,394 | 2,163 | 26,732 | 6,416 | 11,152 | 26,487 | 1,194 | 2,644 | 1,796 | 2,096 | 759 | 92,795 | 37.15% | 6 | 0 | 6 |
| Moderate Party | M | 1,167 | 382 | 2,061 | 1,000 | 20,977 | 2,939 | 4,176 | 17,017 | 615 | 2,198 | 1,057 | 976 | 402 | 54,967 | 22.01% | 3 | 1 | 4 |
| Christian Democrats | KD | 947 | 445 | 1,583 | 1,139 | 11,702 | 2,084 | 3,016 | 7,994 | 695 | 1,152 | 759 | 615 | 690 | 32,821 | 13.14% | 2 | 0 | 2 |
| Left Party | V | 874 | 482 | 2,011 | 587 | 8,217 | 1,861 | 3,292 | 8,228 | 308 | 746 | 475 | 489 | 197 | 27,767 | 11.12% | 2 | 0 | 2 |
| Centre Party | C | 575 | 337 | 604 | 823 | 3,392 | 1,036 | 1,115 | 2,302 | 427 | 793 | 312 | 745 | 381 | 12,842 | 5.14% | 1 | 0 | 1 |
| Green Party | MP | 296 | 132 | 551 | 254 | 4,146 | 586 | 1,162 | 3,664 | 171 | 414 | 251 | 196 | 126 | 11,949 | 4.78% | 1 | 0 | 1 |
| Liberal People's Party | FP | 185 | 69 | 402 | 169 | 4,535 | 485 | 840 | 2,182 | 94 | 223 | 183 | 90 | 79 | 9,536 | 3.82% | 0 | 1 | 1 |
| Other parties | | 147 | 35 | 224 | 104 | 2,131 | 266 | 453 | 3,222 | 57 | 192 | 103 | 99 | 47 | 7,080 | 2.83% | 0 | 0 | 0 |
| Valid votes | | 7,639 | 3,396 | 13,830 | 6,239 | 81,832 | 15,673 | 25,206 | 71,096 | 3,561 | 8,362 | 4,936 | 5,306 | 2,681 | 249,757 | 100.00% | 15 | 2 | 17 |
| Rejected votes | | 219 | 111 | 271 | 145 | 2,201 | 416 | 705 | 1,577 | 65 | 169 | 112 | 96 | 38 | 6,125 | 2.39% | | | |
| Total polled | | 7,858 | 3,507 | 14,101 | 6,384 | 84,033 | 16,089 | 25,911 | 72,673 | 3,626 | 8,531 | 5,048 | 5,402 | 2,719 | 255,882 | 82.42% | | | |
| Registered electors | | 9,304 | 4,174 | 16,724 | 7,714 | 100,264 | 19,534 | 31,685 | 90,693 | 4,343 | 10,263 | 6,000 | 6,600 | 3,151 | 310,449 | | | | |
| Turnout | | 84.46% | 84.02% | 84.32% | 82.76% | 83.81% | 82.36% | 81.78% | 80.13% | 83.49% | 83.12% | 84.13% | 81.85% | 86.29% | 82.42% | | | | |

The following candidates were elected:

- Constituency seats (personal mandates) - Lena Ek (C), 2,206 votes.
- Constituency seats (party mandates) - Yvonne Andersson (KD), 670 votes; Gunnar Axén (M), 1,455 votes; Inge Carlsson (S), 810 votes; Britt-Marie Danestig (V), 1,302 votes; Dan Ericsson (KD), 575 votes; Viola Furubjelke (S), 880 votes; Stefan Hagfeldt (M), 3,783 votes; Helena Hillar Rosenqvist (MP), 197 votes; Sonia Karlsson (S), 2,453 votes; Maj-Inger Klingvall (S), 2,891 votes; Conny Öhman (S), 1,916 votes; Berndt Sköldestig (S), 826 votes; Per Unckel (M), 3,742 votes; and Carlinge Wisberg (V), 648 votes.
- Levelling seats (personal mandates) - Karl-Göran Biörsmark (FP), 792 votes.
- Levelling seats (party mandates) - Carl G. Nilsson (M), 1,156 votes.

Permanent substitutions:

- Dan Ericsson (KD) resigned on 3 September 2000 and was replaced by Sven Brus (KD) on 4 September 2000.
- Viola Furubjelke (S) resigned on 1 January 2002 and was replaced by Anne Ludvigsson (S) on the same day.

===== 1994 =====
Results of the 1994 general election held on 18 September 1994:

| Party | | Votes per municipality | | | | | | | | | | | | | Total votes | % | Seats | | |
| Party | | Åtvida- berg | Box- holm | Fins- pång | Kinda | Lin- köping | Mjölby | Motala | Norr- köping | Ödes- hög | Söder- köping | Vad- stena | Valdem- arsvik | Ydre | Total votes | % | Con. | Lev. | Tot. |
|---|---|---|---|---|---|---|---|---|---|---|---|---|---|---|---|---|---|---|---|
| Swedish Social Democratic Party | S | 4,601 | 2,037 | 8,309 | 2,663 | 34,504 | 8,423 | 15,088 | 35,942 | 1,600 | 3,369 | 2,451 | 2,781 | 935 | 122,703 | 46.05% | 7 | 0 | 7 |
| Moderate Party | M | 1,282 | 412 | 2,122 | 1,169 | 21,117 | 3,083 | 4,393 | 18,558 | 754 | 2,231 | 1,121 | 1,049 | 462 | 57,753 | 21.67% | 3 | 0 | 3 |
| Centre Party | C | 912 | 494 | 1,041 | 1,331 | 5,569 | 1,736 | 1,769 | 3,678 | 650 | 1,209 | 527 | 894 | 654 | 20,464 | 7.68% | 1 | 0 | 1 |
| Liberal People's Party | FP | 408 | 140 | 743 | 302 | 8,305 | 961 | 1,634 | 4,038 | 166 | 408 | 342 | 167 | 155 | 17,769 | 6.67% | 1 | 0 | 1 |
| Left Party | V | 389 | 252 | 1,109 | 260 | 4,675 | 936 | 1,590 | 4,493 | 134 | 328 | 201 | 209 | 97 | 14,673 | 5.51% | 1 | 0 | 1 |
| Green Party | MP | 375 | 176 | 655 | 381 | 4,580 | 714 | 1,295 | 3,897 | 217 | 515 | 292 | 272 | 162 | 13,531 | 5.08% | 1 | 0 | 1 |
| Christian Democratic Unity | KDS | 359 | 190 | 785 | 522 | 4,708 | 779 | 1,019 | 2,911 | 308 | 395 | 257 | 264 | 294 | 12,791 | 4.80% | 1 | 0 | 1 |
| New Democracy | NyD | 61 | 34 | 174 | 77 | 1,185 | 183 | 268 | 1,467 | 37 | 154 | 46 | 87 | 20 | 3,793 | 1.42% | 0 | 0 | 0 |
| Other parties | | 90 | 23 | 143 | 37 | 876 | 97 | 128 | 1,315 | 31 | 102 | 22 | 94 | 21 | 2,979 | 1.12% | 0 | 0 | 0 |
| Valid votes | | 8,477 | 3,758 | 15,081 | 6,742 | 85,519 | 16,912 | 27,184 | 76,299 | 3,897 | 8,711 | 5,259 | 5,817 | 2,800 | 266,456 | 100.00% | 15 | 0 | 15 |
| Rejected votes | | 96 | 65 | 199 | 123 | 1,559 | 306 | 418 | 1,172 | 51 | 132 | 86 | 66 | 41 | 4,314 | 1.59% | | | |
| Total polled | | 8,573 | 3,823 | 15,280 | 6,865 | 87,078 | 17,218 | 27,602 | 77,471 | 3,948 | 8,843 | 5,345 | 5,883 | 2,841 | 270,770 | 87.67% | | | |
| Registered electors | | 9,578 | 4,266 | 17,111 | 7,928 | 98,155 | 19,692 | 31,569 | 90,190 | 4,443 | 10,111 | 5,943 | 6,691 | 3,182 | 308,859 | | | | |
| Turnout | | 89.51% | 89.62% | 89.30% | 86.59% | 88.71% | 87.44% | 87.43% | 85.90% | 88.86% | 87.46% | 89.94% | 87.92% | 89.28% | 87.67% | | | | |

The following candidates were elected: Karl-Göran Biörsmark (FP); Inge Carlsson (S); Britt-Marie Danestig-Olofsson (V); Dan Ericsson (KDS); Viola Furubjelke (S); Birger Hagård (M); Sonia Karlsson (S); Maj-Inger Klingvall (S); Roland Larsson (C); Berit Löfstedt (S); Carl G. Nilsson (M); Conny Öhman (S); Birger Schlaug (MP); Lars Stjernkvist (S); and Per Unckel (M).

Permanent substitutions:

- Lars Stjernkvist (S) resigned on 31 May 1998 and was replaced by Berndt Sköldestig (S) on 1 June 1998.

===== 1991 =====
Results of the 1991 general election held on 15 September 1991:

| Party | | Votes per municipality | | | | | | | | | | | | | Total votes | % | Seats | | |
| Party | | Åtvida- berg | Box- holm | Fins- pång | Kinda | Lin- köping | Mjölby | Motala | Norr- köping | Ödes- hög | Söder- köping | Vad- stena | Valdem- arsvik | Ydre | Total votes | % | Con. | Lev. | Tot. |
|---|---|---|---|---|---|---|---|---|---|---|---|---|---|---|---|---|---|---|---|
| Swedish Social Democratic Party | S | 3,859 | 1,872 | 7,650 | 2,159 | 26,815 | 7,088 | 12,862 | 30,092 | 1,307 | 2,542 | 2,065 | 2,397 | 756 | 101,464 | 38.82% | 7 | 0 | 7 |
| Moderate Party | M | 1,253 | 382 | 1,855 | 1,081 | 20,286 | 3,020 | 4,327 | 17,949 | 642 | 1,957 | 1,060 | 960 | 424 | 55,196 | 21.12% | 4 | 0 | 4 |
| Christian Democratic Unity | KDS | 762 | 319 | 1,254 | 893 | 7,999 | 1,581 | 1,916 | 5,660 | 614 | 700 | 486 | 388 | 485 | 23,057 | 8.82% | 1 | 0 | 1 |
| Centre Party | C | 969 | 540 | 1,135 | 1,367 | 5,623 | 1,753 | 1,895 | 4,314 | 656 | 1,322 | 572 | 943 | 649 | 21,738 | 8.32% | 1 | 0 | 1 |
| Liberal People's Party | FP | 543 | 149 | 991 | 382 | 8,835 | 1,208 | 2,195 | 5,772 | 201 | 569 | 404 | 272 | 174 | 21,695 | 8.30% | 1 | 0 | 1 |
| New Democracy | NyD | 502 | 188 | 969 | 425 | 5,024 | 1,217 | 1,617 | 5,449 | 253 | 734 | 327 | 408 | 192 | 17,305 | 6.62% | 1 | 0 | 1 |
| Left Party | V | 256 | 180 | 767 | 197 | 3,288 | 584 | 1,094 | 3,318 | 85 | 216 | 125 | 168 | 72 | 10,350 | 3.96% | 0 | 1 | 1 |
| Green Party | MP | 203 | 84 | 416 | 170 | 2,829 | 362 | 683 | 2,241 | 133 | 317 | 126 | 124 | 87 | 7,775 | 2.97% | 0 | 0 | 0 |
| Other parties | | 42 | 13 | 58 | 24 | 855 | 95 | 246 | 1,241 | 27 | 98 | 15 | 76 | 17 | 2,807 | 1.07% | 0 | 0 | 0 |
| Valid votes | | 8,389 | 3,727 | 15,095 | 6,698 | 81,554 | 16,908 | 26,835 | 76,036 | 3,918 | 8,455 | 5,180 | 5,736 | 2,856 | 261,387 | 100.00% | 15 | 1 | 16 |
| Rejected votes | | 168 | 97 | 213 | 142 | 1,792 | 380 | 484 | 1,372 | 69 | 174 | 106 | 68 | 40 | 5,105 | 1.92% | | | |
| Total polled | | 8,557 | 3,824 | 15,308 | 6,840 | 83,346 | 17,288 | 27,319 | 77,408 | 3,987 | 8,629 | 5,286 | 5,804 | 2,896 | 266,492 | 87.28% | | | |
| Registered electors | | 9,627 | 4,339 | 17,174 | 7,942 | 94,389 | 19,902 | 31,469 | 90,360 | 4,497 | 9,844 | 5,926 | 6,635 | 3,234 | 305,338 | | | | |
| Turnout | | 88.89% | 88.13% | 89.13% | 86.12% | 88.30% | 86.87% | 86.81% | 85.67% | 88.66% | 87.66% | 89.20% | 87.48% | 89.55% | 87.28% | | | | |

The following candidates were elected: Karl-Göran Biörsmark (FP); Ingvar Björk (S); Inge Carlsson (S); Dan Ericsson (KDS); Viola Furubjelke (S); Birger Hagård (M); Bert Karlsson (NyD); Sonia Karlsson (S); Maj-Inger Klingvall (S); Roland Larsson (C); Pehr Löfgreen (M); Berit Löfstedt (S); Carl G. Nilsson (M); Elisabeth Persson (V); Mona Saint Cyr (M); and Lars Stjernkvist (S).

==== 1980s ====
===== 1988 =====
Results of the 1988 general election held on 18 September 1988:

| Party | | Votes per municipality | | | | | | | | | | | | | Total votes | % | Seats | | |
| Party | | Åtvida- berg | Box- holm | Fins- pång | Kinda | Lin- köping | Mjölby | Motala | Norr- köping | Ödes- hög | Söder- köping | Vad- stena | Valdem- arsvik | Ydre | Total votes | % | Con. | Lev. | Tot. |
|---|---|---|---|---|---|---|---|---|---|---|---|---|---|---|---|---|---|---|---|
| Swedish Social Democratic Party | S | 4,585 | 2,068 | 8,519 | 2,421 | 32,118 | 8,091 | 14,065 | 35,040 | 1,533 | 2,882 | 2,253 | 2,709 | 806 | 117,090 | 45.61% | 7 | 1 | 8 |
| Moderate Party | M | 976 | 309 | 1,601 | 947 | 15,895 | 2,390 | 3,294 | 15,167 | 579 | 1,496 | 959 | 833 | 372 | 44,818 | 17.46% | 2 | 1 | 3 |
| Centre Party | C | 1,269 | 670 | 1,564 | 1,748 | 8,270 | 2,559 | 2,741 | 6,150 | 887 | 1,722 | 764 | 1,181 | 849 | 30,374 | 11.83% | 2 | 0 | 2 |
| Liberal People's Party | FP | 667 | 199 | 1,271 | 616 | 10,199 | 1,584 | 2,981 | 8,237 | 307 | 779 | 516 | 391 | 338 | 28,085 | 10.94% | 2 | 0 | 2 |
| Green Party | MP | 369 | 148 | 744 | 292 | 4,651 | 550 | 1,277 | 3,909 | 162 | 545 | 243 | 230 | 170 | 13,290 | 5.18% | 1 | 0 | 1 |
| Left Party – Communists | VPK | 229 | 224 | 841 | 183 | 4,336 | 756 | 1,418 | 4,246 | 113 | 244 | 169 | 189 | 61 | 13,009 | 5.07% | 1 | 0 | 1 |
| Christian Democratic Unity | KDS | 304 | 125 | 624 | 401 | 3,137 | 606 | 774 | 2,048 | 302 | 260 | 188 | 144 | 230 | 9,143 | 3.56% | 0 | 0 | 0 |
| Other parties | | 10 | 5 | 26 | 11 | 545 | 29 | 60 | 218 | 4 | 5 | 4 | 7 | 2 | 926 | 0.36% | 0 | 0 | 0 |
| Valid votes | | 8,409 | 3,748 | 15,190 | 6,619 | 79,151 | 16,565 | 26,610 | 75,015 | 3,887 | 7,933 | 5,096 | 5,684 | 2,828 | 256,735 | 100.00% | 15 | 2 | 17 |
| Rejected votes | | 79 | 48 | 135 | 89 | 1,009 | 261 | 353 | 981 | 38 | 82 | 73 | 59 | 39 | 3,246 | 1.25% | | | |
| Total polled | | 8,488 | 3,796 | 15,325 | 6,708 | 80,160 | 16,826 | 26,963 | 75,996 | 3,925 | 8,015 | 5,169 | 5,743 | 2,867 | 259,981 | 86.54% | | | |
| Registered electors | | 9,526 | 4,274 | 17,307 | 7,699 | 91,479 | 19,520 | 31,178 | 90,052 | 4,440 | 9,290 | 5,849 | 6,576 | 3,237 | 300,427 | | | | |
| Turnout | | 89.10% | 88.82% | 88.55% | 87.13% | 87.63% | 86.20% | 86.48% | 84.39% | 88.40% | 86.28% | 88.37% | 87.33% | 88.57% | 86.54% | | | | |

The following candidates were elected: Karl-Göran Biörsmark (FP); Ingvar Björk (S); Lola Björkquist (FP); Inge Carlsson (S); Viola Furubjelke (S); Birger Hagård (M); Torsten A. Karlsson (S); Maj-Inger Klingvall (S); Roland Larsson (C); Berit Löfstedt (S); Christer Nilsson (S); Carl G. Nilsson (M); Lars Norberg (MP); Elisabeth Persson (VPK); Mona Saint Cyr (M); Sture Thun (S); and Anna Wohlin Andersson (C).

Permanent substitutions:

- Anna Wohlin Andersson (C) died on 8 May 1989 and was replaced by Hugo Andersson (C) on 10 May 1989.

===== 1985 =====
Results of the 1985 general election held on 15 September 1985:

| Party | | Votes per municipality | | | | | | | | | | | | | Total votes | % | Seats | | |
| Party | | Åtvida- berg | Box- holm | Fins- pång | Kinda | Lin- köping | Mjölby | Motala | Norr- köping | Ödes- hög | Söder- köping | Vad- stena | Valdem- arsvik | Ydre | Total votes | % | Con. | Lev. | Tot. |
|---|---|---|---|---|---|---|---|---|---|---|---|---|---|---|---|---|---|---|---|
| Swedish Social Democratic Party | S | 4,748 | 2,215 | 9,307 | 2,521 | 34,450 | 8,463 | 14,941 | 39,309 | 1,657 | 2,905 | 2,394 | 2,903 | 882 | 126,695 | 47.53% | 8 | 0 | 8 |
| Moderate Party | M | 1,320 | 410 | 2,173 | 1,299 | 18,918 | 3,060 | 4,352 | 18,114 | 730 | 1,872 | 1,069 | 1,068 | 531 | 54,916 | 20.60% | 3 | 0 | 3 |
| Centre Party | C | 1,493 | 792 | 2,006 | 2,149 | 8,945 | 2,933 | 3,110 | 6,917 | 1,153 | 1,888 | 846 | 1,280 | 1,061 | 34,573 | 12.97% | 2 | 0 | 2 |
| Liberal People's Party | FP | 852 | 313 | 1,540 | 727 | 12,374 | 1,953 | 3,684 | 9,898 | 405 | 943 | 676 | 526 | 457 | 34,348 | 12.89% | 2 | 0 | 2 |
| Left Party – Communists | VPK | 238 | 214 | 735 | 153 | 3,998 | 616 | 1,268 | 3,739 | 108 | 198 | 147 | 207 | 51 | 11,672 | 4.38% | 0 | 1 | 1 |
| Green Party | MP | 106 | 24 | 222 | 80 | 1,190 | 164 | 304 | 1,001 | 41 | 170 | 69 | 52 | 42 | 3,465 | 1.30% | 0 | 0 | 0 |
| Other parties | | 11 | 8 | 18 | 10 | 626 | 38 | 37 | 103 | 9 | 2 | 17 | 11 | 0 | 890 | 0.33% | 0 | 0 | 0 |
| Valid votes | | 8,768 | 3,976 | 16,001 | 6,939 | 80,501 | 17,227 | 27,696 | 79,081 | 4,103 | 7,978 | 5,218 | 6,047 | 3,024 | 266,559 | 100.00% | 15 | 1 | 16 |
| Rejected votes | | 85 | 34 | 127 | 69 | 775 | 202 | 217 | 625 | 30 | 67 | 62 | 39 | 19 | 2,351 | 0.87% | | | |
| Total polled | | 8,853 | 4,010 | 16,128 | 7,008 | 81,276 | 17,429 | 27,913 | 79,706 | 4,133 | 8,045 | 5,280 | 6,086 | 3,043 | 268,910 | 90.56% | | | |
| Registered electors | | 9,642 | 4,362 | 17,492 | 7,746 | 89,024 | 19,338 | 30,852 | 89,353 | 4,538 | 8,904 | 5,743 | 6,636 | 3,314 | 296,944 | | | | |
| Turnout | | 91.82% | 91.93% | 92.20% | 90.47% | 91.30% | 90.13% | 90.47% | 89.20% | 91.08% | 90.35% | 91.94% | 91.71% | 91.82% | 90.56% | | | | |

The following candidates were elected: Nils Berndtson (VPK); Karl-Göran Biörsmark (FP); Ingvar Björk (S); Inge Carlsson (S); Anders Dahlgren (C); Viola Furubjelke (S); Birger Hagård (M); Marianne Karlsson (C); Torsten A. Karlsson (S); Maj-Lis Landberg (S); Berit Löfstedt (S); Christer Nilsson (S); Börje Stensson (FP); Per-Olof Strindberg (M); Sture Thun (S); and Per Unckel (M).

Permanent substitutions:

- Anders Dahlgren (C) died on 24 March 1986 and was replaced by Anna Wohlin Andersson (C) on 25 March 1986.
- Per Unckel (M) resigned on 8 October 1986 and was replaced by Mona Saint Cyr (M) on the same day.

===== 1982 =====
Results of the 1982 general election held on 19 September 1982:

| Party | | Votes per municipality | | | | | | | | | | | | | Total votes | % | Seats | | |
| Party | | Åtvida- berg | Box- holm | Fins- pång | Kinda | Lin- köping | Mjölby | Motala | Norr- köping | Ödes- hög | Söder- köping | Vad- stena | Valdem- arsvik | Ydre | Total votes | % | Con. | Lev. | Tot. |
|---|---|---|---|---|---|---|---|---|---|---|---|---|---|---|---|---|---|---|---|
| Swedish Social Democratic Party | S | 4,839 | 2,239 | 9,542 | 2,575 | 34,343 | 8,645 | 15,296 | 39,908 | 1,710 | 2,836 | 2,457 | 2,955 | 872 | 128,217 | 48.36% | 7 | 1 | 8 |
| Moderate Party | M | 1,473 | 492 | 2,404 | 1,450 | 21,064 | 3,416 | 4,922 | 19,746 | 819 | 1,960 | 1,169 | 1,136 | 606 | 60,657 | 22.88% | 4 | 0 | 4 |
| Centre Party | C | 1,607 | 870 | 2,126 | 2,212 | 10,344 | 3,221 | 3,814 | 8,932 | 1,138 | 2,111 | 993 | 1,424 | 1,064 | 39,856 | 15.03% | 2 | 1 | 3 |
| Liberal People's Party | FP | 286 | 115 | 677 | 335 | 4,780 | 752 | 1,574 | 3,602 | 165 | 342 | 364 | 242 | 287 | 13,521 | 5.10% | 1 | 0 | 1 |
| Left Party – Communists | VPK | 266 | 191 | 686 | 143 | 4,457 | 680 | 1,200 | 3,972 | 104 | 230 | 130 | 218 | 54 | 12,331 | 4.65% | 1 | 0 | 1 |
| Christian Democratic Unity | KDS | 237 | 100 | 455 | 309 | 2,196 | 424 | 585 | 1,498 | 168 | 153 | 126 | 125 | 161 | 6,537 | 2.47% | 0 | 0 | 0 |
| Green Party | MP | 95 | 29 | 221 | 63 | 1,290 | 194 | 313 | 1,070 | 44 | 117 | 72 | 81 | 41 | 3,630 | 1.37% | 0 | 0 | 0 |
| Other parties | | 8 | 4 | 10 | 8 | 213 | 27 | 31 | 84 | 2 | 0 | 1 | 6 | 4 | 398 | 0.15% | 0 | 0 | 0 |
| Valid votes | | 8,811 | 4,040 | 16,121 | 7,095 | 78,687 | 17,359 | 27,735 | 78,812 | 4,150 | 7,749 | 5,312 | 6,187 | 3,089 | 265,147 | 100.00% | 15 | 2 | 17 |
| Rejected votes | | 87 | 25 | 130 | 65 | 990 | 213 | 294 | 799 | 28 | 67 | 62 | 39 | 18 | 2,817 | 1.05% | | | |
| Total polled | | 8,898 | 4,065 | 16,251 | 7,160 | 79,677 | 17,572 | 28,029 | 79,611 | 4,178 | 7,816 | 5,374 | 6,226 | 3,107 | 267,964 | 91.98% | | | |
| Registered electors | | 9,558 | 4,371 | 17,401 | 7,805 | 86,183 | 19,072 | 30,456 | 87,674 | 4,543 | 8,486 | 5,765 | 6,701 | 3,329 | 291,344 | | | | |
| Turnout | | 93.09% | 93.00% | 93.39% | 91.74% | 92.45% | 92.14% | 92.03% | 90.80% | 91.97% | 92.10% | 93.22% | 92.91% | 93.33% | 91.98% | | | | |

The following candidates were elected: Nils Berndtson (VPK); Ingvar Björk (S); Inge Carlsson (S); Anders Dahlgren (C); Birger Hagård (M); Marianne Karlsson (C); Torsten A. Karlsson (S); Maria Lagergren (S); Maj-Lis Landberg (S); Christer Nilsson (S); Mona Saint Cyr (M); Börje Stensson (FP); Per-Olof Strindberg (M); Sture Thun (S); Per Unckel (M); Erik Wärnberg (S); and Anna Wohlin Andersson (C).

Permanent substitutions:

- Erik Wärnberg (S) died on 27 May 1983 and was replaced by Berit Löfstedt (S) on 31 May 1983.

==== 1970s ====
===== 1979 =====
Results of the 1979 general election held on 16 September 1979:

| Party | | Votes per municipality | | | | | | | | | | | | | Total votes | % | Seats | | |
| Party | | Åtvida- berg | Box- holm | Fins- pång | Kinda | Lin- köping | Mjölby | Motala | Norr- köping | Ödes- hög | Söder- köping | Vad- stena | Valdem- arsvik | Ydre | Total votes | % | Con. | Lev. | Tot. |
|---|---|---|---|---|---|---|---|---|---|---|---|---|---|---|---|---|---|---|---|
| Swedish Social Democratic Party | S | 4,773 | 2,170 | 9,075 | 2,518 | 33,043 | 8,199 | 14,626 | 37,325 | 1,560 | 2,468 | 2,356 | 2,951 | 766 | 121,830 | 46.65% | 7 | 1 | 8 |
| Moderate Party | M | 1,187 | 376 | 2,100 | 1,324 | 17,579 | 2,886 | 4,219 | 17,203 | 695 | 1,603 | 971 | 959 | 526 | 51,628 | 19.77% | 3 | 0 | 3 |
| Centre Party | C | 1,793 | 990 | 2,367 | 2,540 | 11,389 | 3,643 | 4,212 | 10,365 | 1,327 | 2,285 | 1,078 | 1,648 | 1,178 | 44,815 | 17.16% | 3 | 0 | 3 |
| Liberal People's Party | FP | 601 | 235 | 1,322 | 441 | 8,169 | 1,439 | 2,601 | 7,529 | 302 | 550 | 515 | 356 | 377 | 24,437 | 9.36% | 1 | 1 | 2 |
| Left Party – Communists | VPK | 222 | 197 | 724 | 124 | 4,239 | 589 | 1,128 | 3,762 | 102 | 186 | 124 | 220 | 61 | 11,678 | 4.47% | 1 | 0 | 1 |
| Christian Democratic Unity | KDS | 182 | 64 | 413 | 241 | 1,521 | 343 | 461 | 1,049 | 151 | 129 | 113 | 102 | 117 | 4,886 | 1.87% | 0 | 0 | 0 |
| Communist Party of Sweden | SKP | 5 | 3 | 25 | 0 | 204 | 17 | 66 | 169 | 2 | 2 | 35 | 4 | 0 | 532 | 0.20% | 0 | 0 | 0 |
| Workers' Party – The Communists | APK | 0 | 9 | 9 | 12 | 7 | 21 | 33 | 45 | 0 | 10 | 0 | 4 | 16 | 166 | 0.06% | 0 | 0 | 0 |
| Other parties | | 7 | 12 | 43 | 19 | 495 | 17 | 43 | 424 | 11 | 39 | 20 | 45 | 13 | 1,188 | 0.45% | 0 | 0 | 0 |
| Valid votes | | 8,770 | 4,056 | 16,078 | 7,219 | 76,646 | 17,154 | 27,389 | 77,871 | 4,150 | 7,272 | 5,212 | 6,289 | 3,054 | 261,160 | 100.00% | 15 | 2 | 17 |
| Rejected votes | | 27 | 22 | 87 | 41 | 534 | 96 | 167 | 392 | 18 | 28 | 27 | 17 | 9 | 1,465 | 0.56% | | | |
| Total polled | | 8,797 | 4,078 | 16,165 | 7,260 | 77,180 | 17,250 | 27,556 | 78,263 | 4,168 | 7,300 | 5,239 | 6,306 | 3,063 | 262,625 | 91.22% | | | |
| Registered electors | | 9,484 | 4,391 | 17,381 | 7,875 | 84,154 | 18,826 | 30,144 | 87,365 | 4,537 | 7,970 | 5,729 | 6,802 | 3,247 | 287,905 | | | | |
| Turnout | | 92.76% | 92.87% | 93.00% | 92.19% | 91.71% | 91.63% | 91.41% | 89.58% | 91.87% | 91.59% | 91.45% | 92.71% | 94.33% | 91.22% | | | | |

The following candidates were elected: Nils Berndtson (VPK); Anders Dahlgren (C); Lars Henrikson (S); Marianne Karlsson (C); Torsten A. Karlsson (S); Maria Lagergren (S); Maj-Lis Landberg (S); Carl Lidbom (S); Christer Nilsson (S); Åke Polstam (C); Mona Saint Cyr (M); Börje Stensson (FP); Per-Olof Strindberg (M); Kersti Swartz (FP); Sture Thun (S); Per Unckel (M); and Erik Wärnberg (S).

Permanent substitutions:

- Carl Lidbom (S) resigned on 1 May 1982 and was replaced by Inge Carlsson (S) on the same day.

===== 1976 =====
Results of the 1976 general election held on 19 September 1976:

| Party | | Votes per municipality | | | | | | | | | | | | Total votes | % | Seats | | |
| Party | | Åtvida- berg | Box- holm | Fins- pång | Kinda | Lin- köping | Mjölby | Motala | Norr- köping | Ödes- hög | Söder- köping | Valdem- arsvik | Ydre | Total votes | % | Con. | Lev. | Tot. |
|---|---|---|---|---|---|---|---|---|---|---|---|---|---|---|---|---|---|---|
| Swedish Social Democratic Party | S | 4,832 | 2,233 | 8,917 | 2,525 | 32,516 | 7,967 | 16,658 | 37,243 | 1,495 | 2,311 | 2,906 | 782 | 120,385 | 46.19% | 7 | 1 | 8 |
| Centre Party | C | 2,184 | 1,146 | 3,124 | 2,967 | 16,063 | 4,816 | 7,070 | 15,783 | 1,567 | 2,603 | 1,891 | 1,371 | 60,585 | 23.25% | 4 | 0 | 4 |
| Moderate Party | M | 936 | 326 | 1,651 | 1,087 | 13,130 | 2,136 | 4,014 | 13,811 | 541 | 1,203 | 809 | 341 | 39,985 | 15.34% | 2 | 1 | 3 |
| People's Party | F | 546 | 192 | 1,298 | 457 | 8,565 | 1,312 | 3,112 | 7,439 | 312 | 574 | 328 | 386 | 24,521 | 9.41% | 2 | 0 | 2 |
| Left Party – Communists | VPK | 155 | 174 | 534 | 123 | 3,315 | 527 | 1,104 | 2,751 | 76 | 120 | 173 | 44 | 9,096 | 3.49% | 0 | 1 | 1 |
| Christian Democratic Unity | KDS | 202 | 53 | 395 | 250 | 1,627 | 345 | 612 | 1,239 | 149 | 135 | 116 | 104 | 5,227 | 2.01% | 0 | 0 | 0 |
| Communist Party of Sweden | SKP | 6 | 9 | 58 | 1 | 252 | 23 | 60 | 287 | 3 | 8 | 5 | 3 | 715 | 0.27% | 0 | 0 | 0 |
| Other parties | | 1 | 1 | 4 | 2 | 52 | 2 | 14 | 11 | 0 | 0 | 1 | 0 | 88 | 0.03% | 0 | 0 | 0 |
| Valid votes | | 8,862 | 4,134 | 15,981 | 7,412 | 75,520 | 17,128 | 32,644 | 78,564 | 4,143 | 6,954 | 6,229 | 3,031 | 260,602 | 100.00% | 15 | 3 | 18 |
| Rejected votes | | 25 | 9 | 41 | 23 | 317 | 59 | 115 | 245 | 3 | 16 | 17 | 3 | 873 | 0.33% | | | |
| Total polled | | 8,887 | 4,143 | 16,022 | 7,435 | 75,837 | 17,187 | 32,759 | 78,809 | 4,146 | 6,970 | 6,246 | 3,034 | 261,475 | 92.31% | | | |
| Registered electors | | 9,463 | 4,436 | 17,005 | 7,970 | 81,825 | 18,608 | 35,501 | 86,534 | 4,488 | 7,524 | 6,674 | 3,235 | 283,263 | | | | |
| Turnout | | 93.91% | 93.39% | 94.22% | 93.29% | 92.68% | 92.36% | 92.28% | 91.07% | 92.38% | 92.64% | 93.59% | 93.79% | 92.31% | | | | |

The following candidates were elected: Gillis Augustsson (S); Nils Berndtson (VPK); Anders Dahlgren (C); Erik Glimnér (C); Lars Henrikson (S); Marianne Karlsson (C); Torsten A. Karlsson (S); Maj-Lis Landberg (S); Ingemar Leander (S); Carl Lidbom (S); Christer Nilsson (S); Åke Polstam (C); Kurt Söderström (M); Börje Stensson (F); Per-Olof Strindberg (M); Kersti Swartz (F); Per Unckel (M); and Erik Wärnberg (S).

===== 1973 =====
Results of the 1973 general election held on 16 September 1973:

| Party | | Votes per municipality | | | | | | | | | | | | Total votes | % | Seats | | |
| Party | | Åtvida- berg | Box- holm | Fins- pång | Kinda | Lin- köping | Mjölby | Motala | Norr- köping | Ödes- hög | Söder- köping | Valdem- arsvik | Ydre | Total votes | % | Con. | Lev. | Tot. |
|---|---|---|---|---|---|---|---|---|---|---|---|---|---|---|---|---|---|---|
| Swedish Social Democratic Party | S | 4,713 | 2,118 | 8,732 | 2,348 | 31,064 | 7,608 | 16,221 | 36,955 | 1,477 | 2,284 | 2,782 | 750 | 117,052 | 47.32% | 8 | 0 | 8 |
| Centre Party | C | 2,110 | 1,113 | 3,152 | 2,886 | 16,541 | 4,755 | 7,116 | 15,842 | 1,472 | 2,453 | 1,847 | 1,235 | 60,522 | 24.47% | 4 | 0 | 4 |
| Moderate Party | M | 834 | 281 | 1,422 | 978 | 11,260 | 1,749 | 3,483 | 12,003 | 480 | 988 | 660 | 304 | 34,442 | 13.92% | 2 | 0 | 2 |
| People's Party | F | 478 | 146 | 936 | 383 | 6,023 | 951 | 2,196 | 5,455 | 260 | 388 | 317 | 356 | 17,889 | 7.23% | 1 | 0 | 1 |
| Left Party – Communists | VPK | 171 | 259 | 592 | 115 | 3,169 | 569 | 1,237 | 3,350 | 69 | 138 | 231 | 51 | 9,951 | 4.02% | 0 | 1 | 1 |
| Christian Democratic Unity | KDS | 252 | 85 | 448 | 279 | 2,020 | 439 | 759 | 1,589 | 166 | 191 | 129 | 153 | 6,510 | 2.63% | 0 | 0 | 0 |
| Communist Party of Sweden | SKP | 14 | 2 | 48 | 7 | 231 | 37 | 101 | 370 | 6 | 14 | 8 | 2 | 840 | 0.34% | 0 | 0 | 0 |
| Communist League Marxist–Leninists (the revolutionaries) | KFML(r) | 0 | 0 | 2 | 4 | 57 | 8 | 5 | 64 | 2 | 1 | 8 | 0 | 151 | 0.06% | 0 | 0 | 0 |
| Other parties | | 0 | 2 | 1 | 0 | 6 | 4 | 3 | 2 | 0 | 0 | 0 | 0 | 18 | 0.01% | 0 | 0 | 0 |
| Valid votes | | 8,572 | 4,006 | 15,333 | 7,000 | 70,371 | 16,120 | 31,121 | 75,630 | 3,932 | 6,457 | 5,982 | 2,851 | 247,375 | 100.00% | 15 | 1 | 16 |
| Rejected votes | | 10 | 6 | 20 | 9 | 115 | 41 | 44 | 104 | 3 | 6 | 12 | 2 | 372 | 0.15% | | | |
| Total polled | | 8,582 | 4,012 | 15,353 | 7,009 | 70,486 | 16,161 | 31,165 | 75,734 | 3,935 | 6,463 | 5,994 | 2,853 | 247,747 | 91.30% | | | |
| Registered electors | | 9,228 | 4,374 | 16,379 | 7,650 | 76,642 | 17,762 | 34,131 | 84,365 | 4,294 | 6,998 | 6,458 | 3,078 | 271,359 | | | | |
| Turnout | | 93.00% | 91.72% | 93.74% | 91.62% | 91.97% | 90.99% | 91.31% | 89.77% | 91.64% | 92.35% | 92.82% | 92.69% | 91.30% | | | | |

The following candidates were elected: Gillis Augustsson (S); Nils Berndtson (VPK); Anders Dahlgren (C); Oscar Franzén (S); Erik Glimnér (C); Lars Henrikson (S); Marianne Karlsson (C); Maj-Lis Landberg (S); Ingemar Leander (S); Carl Lidbom (S); Christer Nilsson (S); Åke Polstam (C); Kurt Söderström (M); Per-Olof Strindberg (M); Kersti Swartz (F); and Erik Wärnberg (S).

===== 1970 =====
Results of the 1970 general election held on 20 September 1970:

| Party | | Votes per municipality | | | | | | | | | | | | | | | | | | | | Total votes | % | Seats | | |
| Party | | Aska | Åtvida- berg | Box- holm | Fins- pång | Lin- köping | Mjölby | Motala | Norra Kinda | Norr- köping | Ödes- hög | Söder- köping | Södra Kinda | Stege- borg | Tjällmo | Vad- stena | Valdem- arsvik | Västra Kinda | Vikbo- landet | Ydre | Postal votes | Total votes | % | Con. | Lev. | Tot. |
|---|---|---|---|---|---|---|---|---|---|---|---|---|---|---|---|---|---|---|---|---|---|---|---|---|---|---|
| Swedish Social Democratic Party | S | 598 | 4,587 | 1,999 | 8,008 | 27,947 | 6,882 | 12,066 | 632 | 33,212 | 1,441 | 1,821 | 333 | 280 | 376 | 1,997 | 2,668 | 1,286 | 962 | 722 | 11,013 | 118,830 | 49.52% | 8 | 1 | 9 |
| Centre Party | C | 522 | 1,590 | 956 | 2,194 | 10,920 | 3,492 | 3,183 | 645 | 8,079 | 1,260 | 1,262 | 730 | 561 | 281 | 847 | 1,612 | 1,093 | 1,495 | 1,083 | 4,672 | 46,477 | 19.37% | 3 | 0 | 3 |
| People's Party | F | 135 | 646 | 212 | 1,274 | 9,140 | 1,351 | 2,748 | 189 | 7,910 | 362 | 434 | 45 | 85 | 43 | 411 | 395 | 256 | 239 | 424 | 6,020 | 32,319 | 13.47% | 2 | 0 | 2 |
| Moderate Party | M | 123 | 531 | 223 | 808 | 6,016 | 1,098 | 1,424 | 196 | 6,461 | 339 | 569 | 108 | 125 | 77 | 350 | 499 | 466 | 463 | 251 | 6,861 | 26,988 | 11.25% | 2 | 0 | 2 |
| Left Party – Communists | VPK | 44 | 152 | 260 | 441 | 2,488 | 472 | 905 | 25 | 2,389 | 65 | 64 | 13 | 16 | 8 | 71 | 167 | 43 | 60 | 53 | 871 | 8,607 | 3.59% | 0 | 1 | 1 |
| Christian Democratic Unity | KDS | 25 | 244 | 80 | 317 | 1,577 | 349 | 383 | 89 | 1,019 | 141 | 129 | 66 | 32 | 32 | 109 | 96 | 92 | 136 | 145 | 863 | 5,924 | 2.47% | 0 | 0 | 0 |
| Communist League Marxists-Leninists | KFML | 0 | 5 | 0 | 16 | 57 | 10 | 44 | 0 | 437 | 1 | 7 | 0 | 0 | 0 | 2 | 7 | 10 | 0 | 1 | 166 | 763 | 0.32% | 0 | 0 | 0 |
| Other parties | | 0 | 2 | 1 | 0 | 22 | 1 | 3 | 0 | 0 | 0 | 0 | 0 | 0 | 0 | 0 | 0 | 0 | 0 | 0 | 19 | 48 | 0.02% | 0 | 0 | 0 |
| Valid votes | | 1,447 | 7,757 | 3,731 | 13,058 | 58,167 | 13,655 | 20,756 | 1,776 | 59,507 | 3,609 | 4,286 | 1,295 | 1,099 | 817 | 3,787 | 5,444 | 3,246 | 3,355 | 2,679 | 30,485 | 239,956 | 100.00% | 15 | 2 | 17 |
| Rejected votes | | 1 | 6 | 5 | 12 | 65 | 16 | 32 | 3 | 70 | 3 | 3 | 0 | 0 | 1 | 3 | 7 | 5 | 2 | 1 | 112 | 347 | 0.14% | | | |
| Total polled exc. postal votes | | 1,448 | 7,763 | 3,736 | 13,070 | 58,232 | 13,671 | 20,788 | 1,779 | 59,577 | 3,612 | 4,289 | 1,295 | 1,099 | 818 | 3,790 | 5,451 | 3,251 | 3,357 | 2,680 | 30,597 | 240,303 | | | | |
| Postal votes | | 109 | 654 | 432 | 1,756 | 8,417 | 1,644 | 2,537 | 173 | 10,932 | 353 | 618 | 94 | 139 | 46 | 973 | 697 | 366 | 351 | 253 | -30,597 | -53 | | | | |
| Total polled inc. postal votes | | 1,557 | 8,417 | 4,168 | 14,826 | 66,649 | 15,315 | 23,325 | 1,952 | 70,509 | 3,965 | 4,907 | 1,389 | 1,238 | 864 | 4,763 | 6,148 | 3,617 | 3,708 | 2,933 | 0 | 240,250 | 89.11% | | | |
| Registered electors | | 1,776 | 9,212 | 4,645 | 16,183 | 74,200 | 17,304 | 26,182 | 2,155 | 80,683 | 4,488 | 5,423 | 1,546 | 1,429 | 928 | 5,294 | 6,771 | 4,055 | 4,074 | 3,256 | | 269,604 | | | | |
| Turnout | | 87.67% | 91.37% | 89.73% | 91.61% | 89.82% | 88.51% | 89.09% | 90.58% | 87.39% | 88.35% | 90.48% | 89.84% | 86.63% | 93.10% | 89.97% | 90.80% | 89.20% | 91.02% | 90.08% | | 89.11% | | | | |

The following candidates were elected: Gillis Augustsson (S); Astrid Bergegren (S); Nils Berndtson (VPK); Anders Dahlgren (C); Gunnar Ericsson (F); Oscar Franzén (S); Erik Glimnér (C); Lars Henrikson (S); Rune Johansson (S); Lars Larsson (S); Ingemar Leander (S); Sven Persson (S); Åke Polstam (C); Sigvard Rimås (F); Kurt Söderström (M); Per-Olof Strindberg (M); and Erik Wärnberg (S).

Permanent substitutions:

- Lars Larsson (S) died on 30 April 1971 and was replaced by Börje Runesson (S) in May 1971.
- Sigvard Rimås (F) died on 29 October 1972 and was replaced by Eric Peterson (F) in November 1972.
- Gunnar Ericsson (F) resigned in January 1973 and was replaced by Kersti Swartz (F) in January 1973.
- Rune Johansson (S) resigned in January 1973 and was replaced by Christer Nilsson (S) in January 1973.
