= Britt Olauson =

Swedish politician (born 1945)

Member of the Riksdag
- In office 18 April 2006 – 2 October 2006
- Preceded by: Berndt Sköldestig
- Constituency: Östergötland County

Personal details
- Born: 1945 (age 80–81)
- Party: Social Democratic Party

Britt Eila Maria Olauson (born 1945) is a Swedish politician and former member of the Riksdag, the national legislature. A member of the Social Democratic Party, she represented Östergötland County between April 2006 and October 2006.
