= Göran Hargestam =

Swedish businessman and politician

Thord Göran Hargestam

Member of the Riksdag
- Incumbent
- Assumed office 15 March 2024
- Preceded by: Sven-Olof Sällström
- Constituency: Östergötland County

Personal details
- Born: 26 June 1966 (age 59) Kumla, Örebro County, Sweden
- Party: Sweden Democrats
- Occupation: Businessman, politician

Thord Göran Hargestam (born 26 June 1966 in Kumla) is a Swedish businessman and politician affiliated to the Sweden Democrats who has served as a member of the Riksdag since 2024.

== Biography ==
Hargestam was born in 1966. He was the owner of a construction company before entering politics full time. He was elected as a municipal councilor in Valdemarsvik for the Sweden Democrats and in 2018 became a regional councilor and district chairman for the party in Östergötland.

He stood during the SD during the 2022 Swedish general election but was not elected and instead designated as a substitute member of the Riksdag. He became a full member of parliament to replace Sven-Olof Sällström who died in office and takes Seat 119. Hargestam is a member of the Riksdag Defense Committee and the Swedish-Taiwanese Parliamentarian Association (STPA). In this role, he took part in a visit to Taiwan in 2024 with representatives from other parties in the Riksdag to meet with officials from the Taiwanese government.

Hargestam left his seat from the Swedish parliament on 4 December 2025 after a scandal where Nazi memorabilia, and artefacts (including copies of Mein Kampf, Nazi helmets, and idol pictures of Adolf Hitler) were found stashed in an office building rented by him in Valdemarsvik.
