= Karin Granbom Ellison =

Swedish politician (born 1977)

Member of the Riksdag
- In office 2002–2014
- Constituency: Östergötland County

Personal details
- Born: Karin Maria Granbom Ellison; 9 April 1977 (age 49) Lund, Sweden
- Party: Liberal

Karin Maria Granbom Ellison (born 9 April 1977) is a Swedish Liberal People's Party politician. She was a member of the Riksdag between 2002 and 2014.
