= Mattias Ottosson =

Swedish politician (born 1971)

Member of the Riksdag
- Incumbent
- Assumed office 29 September 2014
- Constituency: Östergötland County

Personal details
- Born: 1971 (age 54–55)
- Party: Social Democrats

Mattias Ottosson (born 1971) is a Swedish politician. Since September 2014, he serves as Member of the Riksdag representing the constituency of Östergötland County.
