= Magnus Oscarsson =

Swedish politician (born 1970)

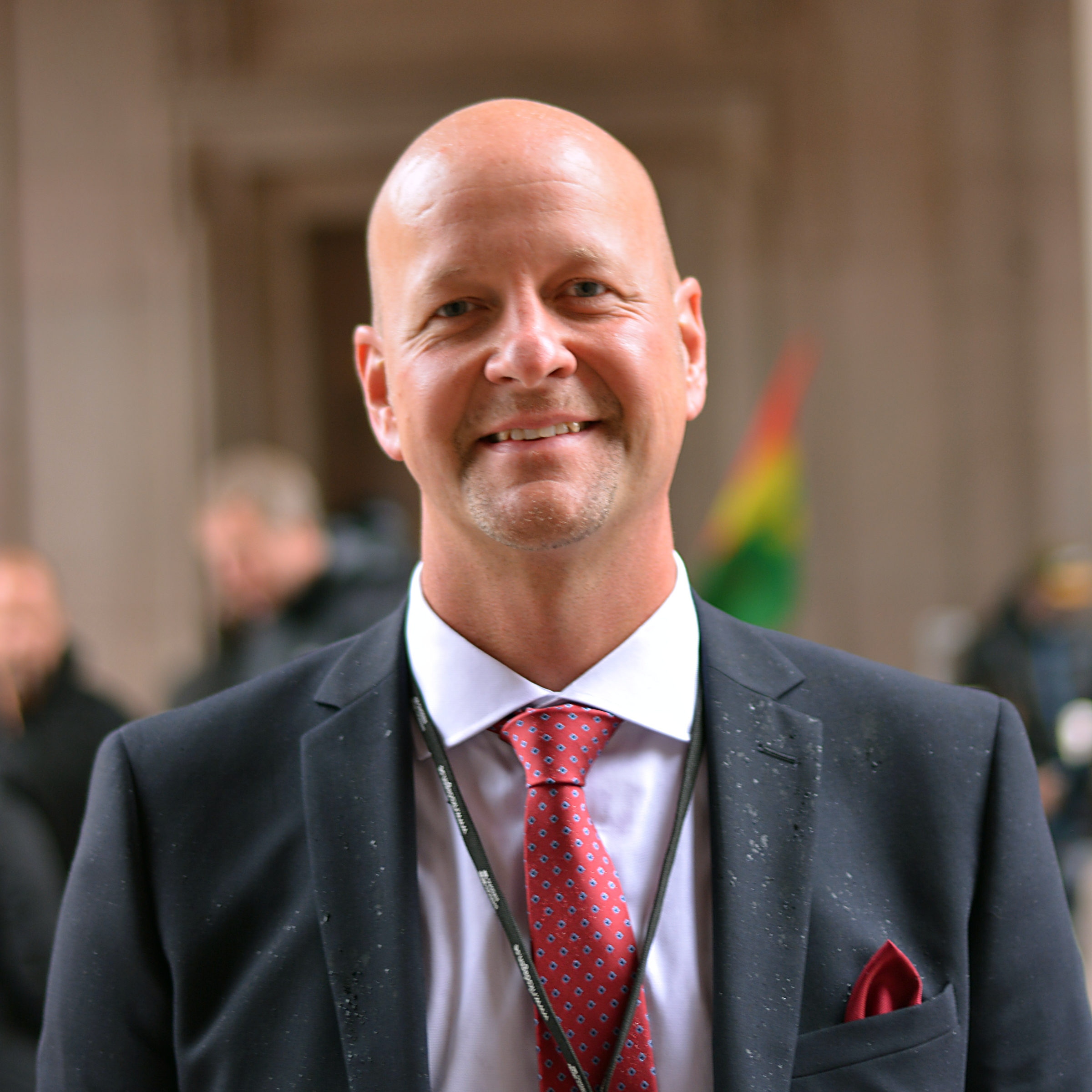

Member of the Riksdag
- Incumbent
- Assumed office 29 September 2014
- Constituency: Östergötland County

Personal details
- Born: 1970 (age 55–56)
- Party: Christian Democrats

Magnus Oscarsson (born 1970) is a Swedish politician. Since September 2014, he has served as Member of the Riksdag representing the constituency of Östergötland County.
