= Conny Öhman =

Swedish politician (1950–2010)

Member of the Riksdag
- In office 3 October 1994 – 2 October 2006
- Constituency: Östergötland County

Personal details
- Born: 19 December 1950
- Died: September 2010 (aged 59)
- Party: Social Democratic Party

Conny Öhman (19 December 1950 – September 2010) was a Swedish politician and member of the Riksdag, the national legislature. A member of the Social Democratic Party, he represented Östergötland County between October 1994 and October 2006. He was a member of the county council in Östergötland County from 1976 to 1994. He died in September 2010 aged 59.
