= Linda Westerlund Snecker =

Swedish politician (born 1983)

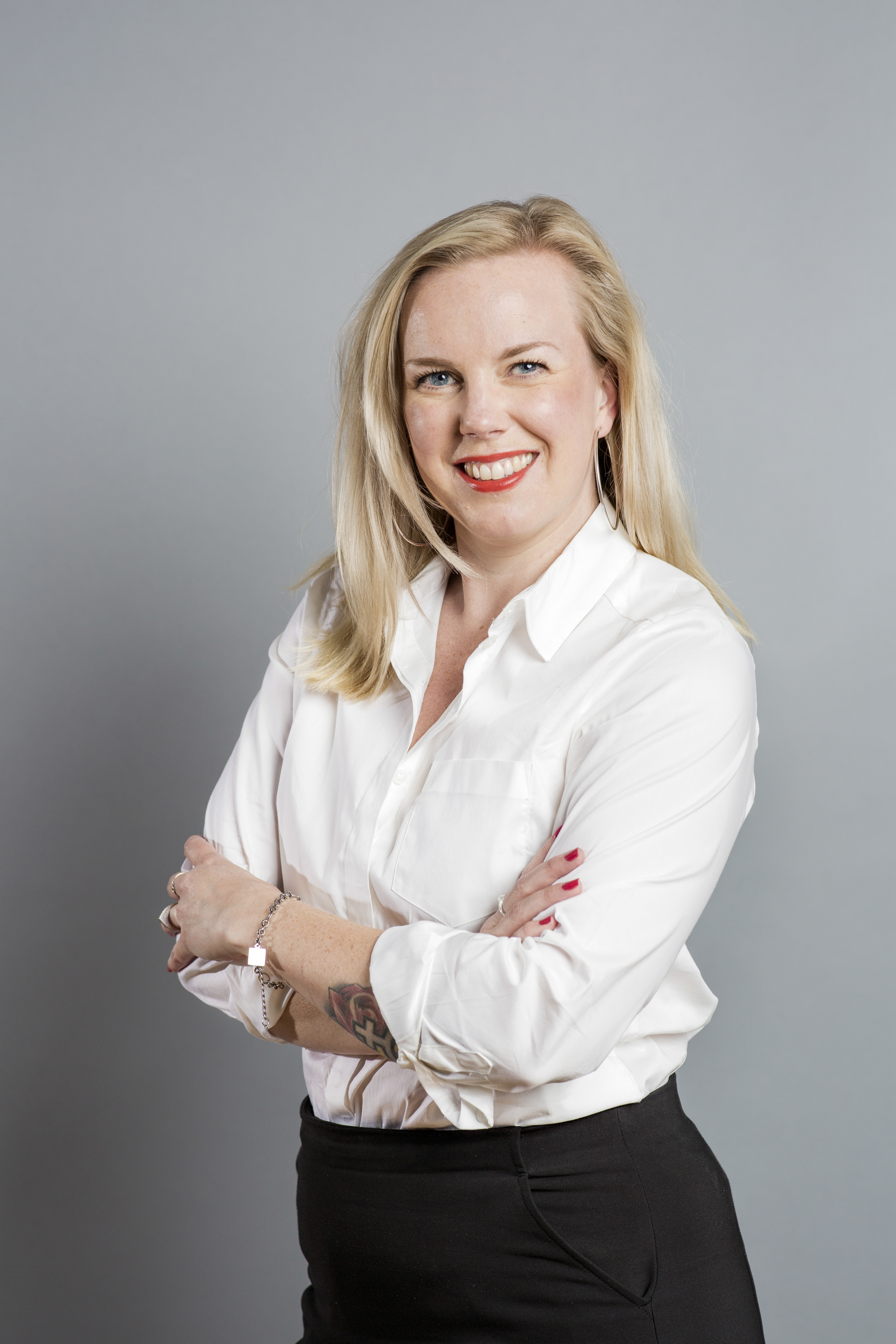
- Snecker in May 2018

Member of the Riksdag
- Incumbent
- Assumed office 29 September 2014
- Constituency: Östergötland County

Personal details
- Born: 3 February 1983 (age 43)
- Party: Left Party

Linda Westerlund Snecker (born 3 February 1983) is a Swedish politician. Since September 2014, she serves as Member of the Riksdag representing the constituency of Östergötland County. She is affiliated with the Left Party.

She was also elected as Member of the Riksdag in September 2018 and September 2022.
