= Eva Lindh =

Swedish politician (born 1971)

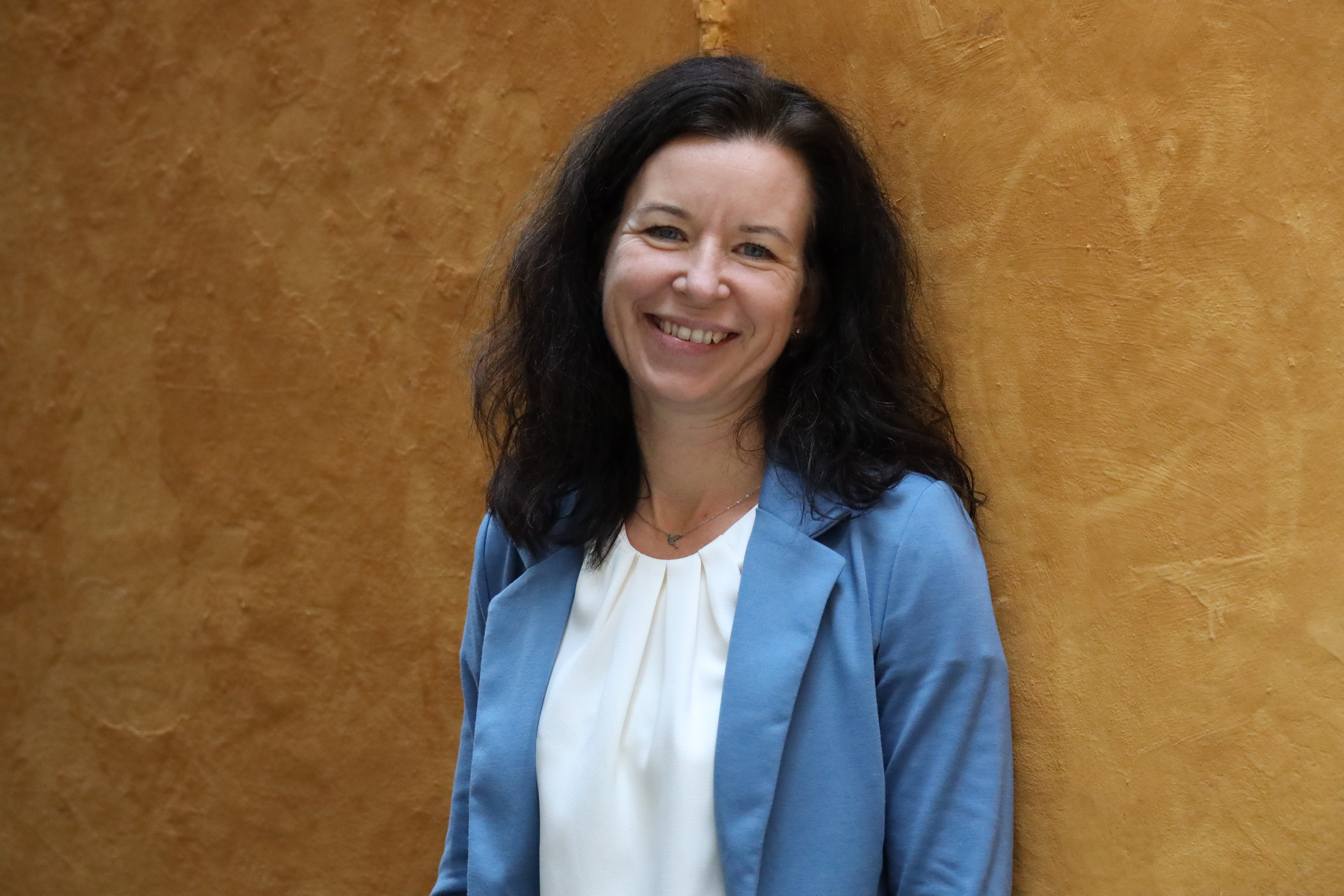

Member of the Riksdag
- Incumbent
- Assumed office 24 September 2018
- Constituency: Östergötland County

Personal details
- Born: 24 December 1971 (age 54)
- Party: Social Democrats

Eva Lindh (born 24 December 1971) is a Swedish politician. As of 24 September 2018, she serves as Member of the Riksdag representing the constituency of Östergötland County.

She served as substitute member of the Riksdag when both Johan Löfstrand and Teresa Carvalho were on parental leave.

She was also elected as Member of the Riksdag in September 2022.
