= Anna-Lena Sörenson =

Swedish politician (born 1954)

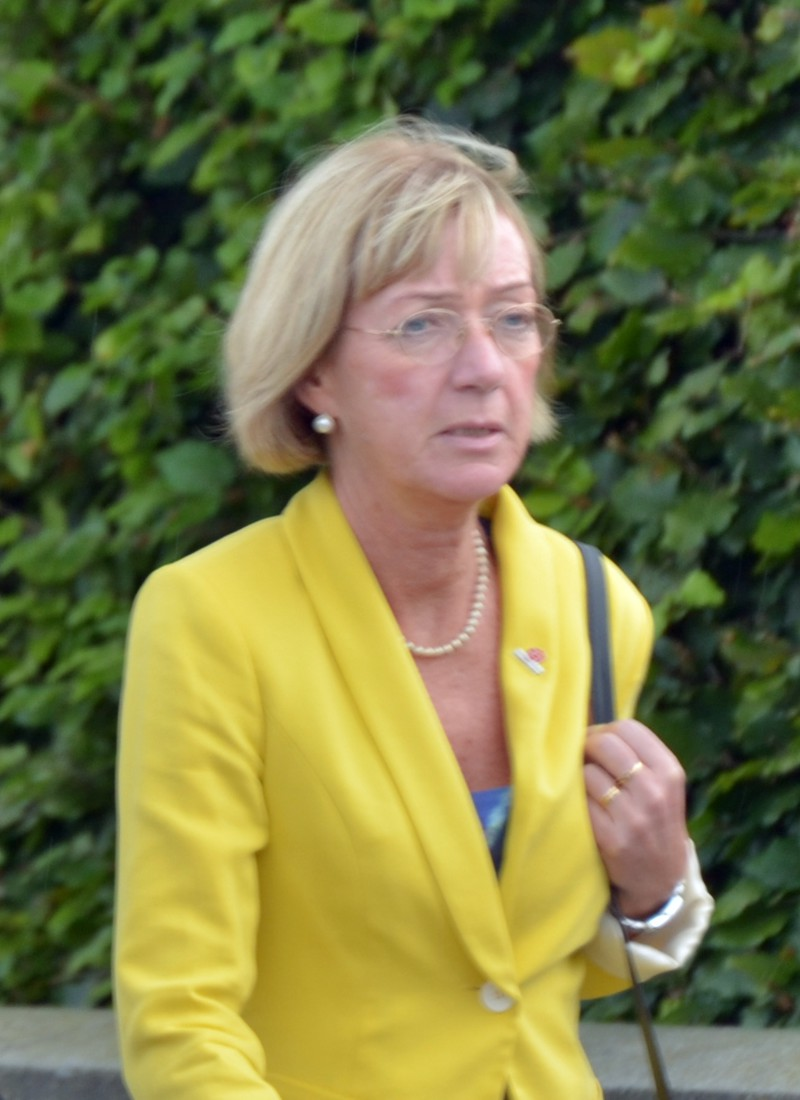

Member of the Riksdag
- In office 4 October 2010 – 24 September 2018
- Constituency: Östergötland County

Personal details
- Born: 1954 (age 71–72)
- Party: Social Democrats

Anna-Lena Sörenson (born 1954) is a Swedish politician. She served as member of the Riksdag from 4 October 2010 to 24 September 2018, representing the constituency of Östergötland County.

She was the head of the Sweden-Kurdistan Parliamentary Network and visited Turkey in 2015 within a delegation of other Swedish politicians and attempted to convince Turkey and the Kurdistan Workers' Party (PKK) to return to the peace process which broke down.

After serving in parliament, she led the Swedish Gambling Market Commission to investigate regulations and measures for online gambling advertising.
