= Clara Aranda =

Swedish politician (born 1988)

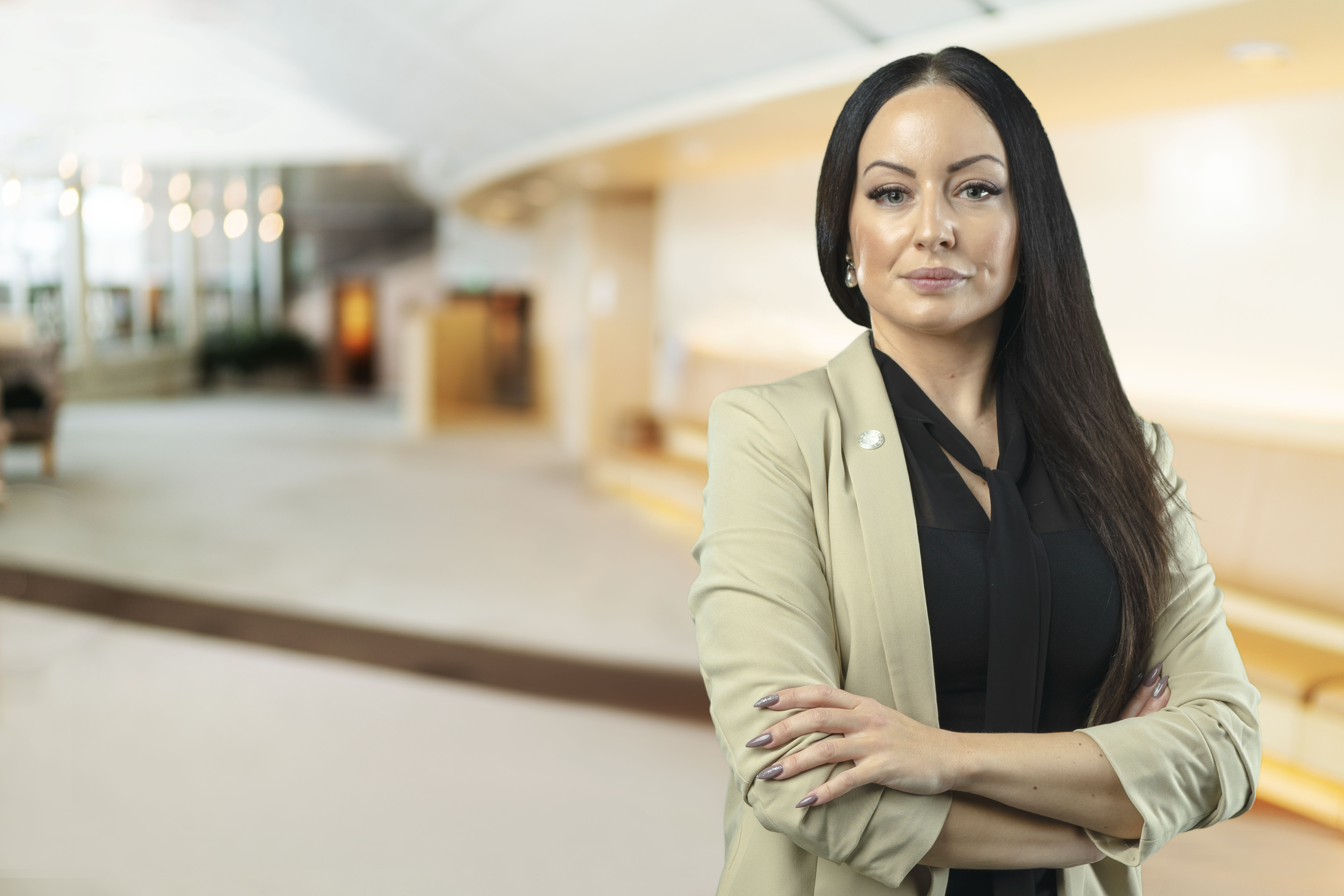

Member of the Riksdag
- Incumbent
- Assumed office 2018
- Constituency: Skåne County

Personal details
- Born: 2 April 1988 (age 38) Norrköping, Sweden
- Party: Sweden Democrats

Clara Félicia Aranda (born 2 April 1988) is a Swedish politician and a member of the Riksdag for the Sweden Democrats party.

Aranda was elected to the Riksdag during the 2018 Swedish general election representing the constituency of Skåne County. She has also served as a councilor for the Sweden Democrats in Östergötland where she was the SD's group leader. Aranda is also the SD's spokeswoman on mental health issues and serves on the education committee in parliament.
