= Erik Glimnér =

Swedish politician (1914–1999)

John Erik Glimnér
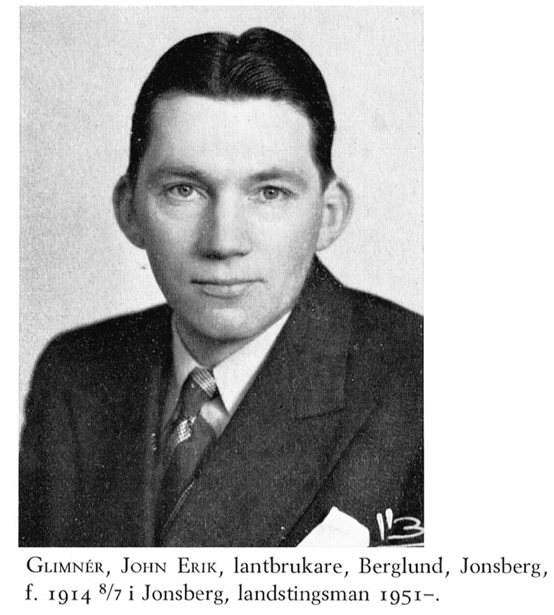

John Erik Glimnér (8 July 1914 – 15 January 1999) was a Swedish politician. He was a member of the Centre Party.
