= Britt-Marie Danestig =

Swedish politician (born 1940)

Britt-Marie Danestig (born 1940) is a Swedish Left Party politician. She was a member of the Riksdag from 1994 until 2006.
