= Helena Hillar Rosenqvist =

Swedish politician (born 1946)

Helena Hillar Rosenqvist (born 1946) is a Swedish Green Party politician. She was a member of the Riksdag from 1998 until 2006. In the Riksdag, she was a member of the housing committee 1998–2006. She was also deputy in the justice committee, the culture committee, the social affairs committee and the traffic committee.
