= Thoralf Alfsson =

Swedish politician

Member of the Riksdag
- In office 2010–2014
- Constituency: Östergötland County

Personal details
- Born: 13 October 1957 (age 68)
- Party: Sweden Democrats (until 2018)

Ola Thoralf Alfsson (born 13 October 1957) is a Swedish blogger and former politician of the Sweden Democrats party who served as a member of the Riksdag.

On the Riksdag website, Alfsson listed his occupation as an automotive consultant before entering politics. Alfsson was elected to the Riksdag in the 2010 Swedish general election for the Sweden Democrats party and represented the Östergötland County constituency. He was also involved in writing some of the party's manifesto ahead of the election. In the Riksdag, he focused on matters related to energy policy, criminal policy, immigration and cultural issues. He also supported a measure by the Swedish police to compile a public register of Romani people in Sweden. Alfsson was a councilor for the Sweden Democrats in Kalmar.

In 2011, a local Social Democratic politician in Östergötland was convicted of defamation and fined after he posted a photoshopped picture of Alfsson in a Nazi uniform on social media.

In November 2018, Alfsson got into a heated dispute with members of the public on Facebook and wrote comments that were deemed inappropriate. Alfsson initially defended the messages, arguing that he was reacting with the same language used by "trolls" who had left posts on the official Facebook page for the Sweden Democrats Kalmar County chapter. However, the deputy leader of SD, Mattias Bäckström Johansson deemed Alfsson's posts as "unacceptable." Alfsson was subsequently expelled from the SD as a result of the Facebook dispute and a series of controversial blog posts he had made.

Since leaving politics, Alfsson has worked as an author and blogger.
