= Yvonne Andersson =

Swedish politician (born 1951)

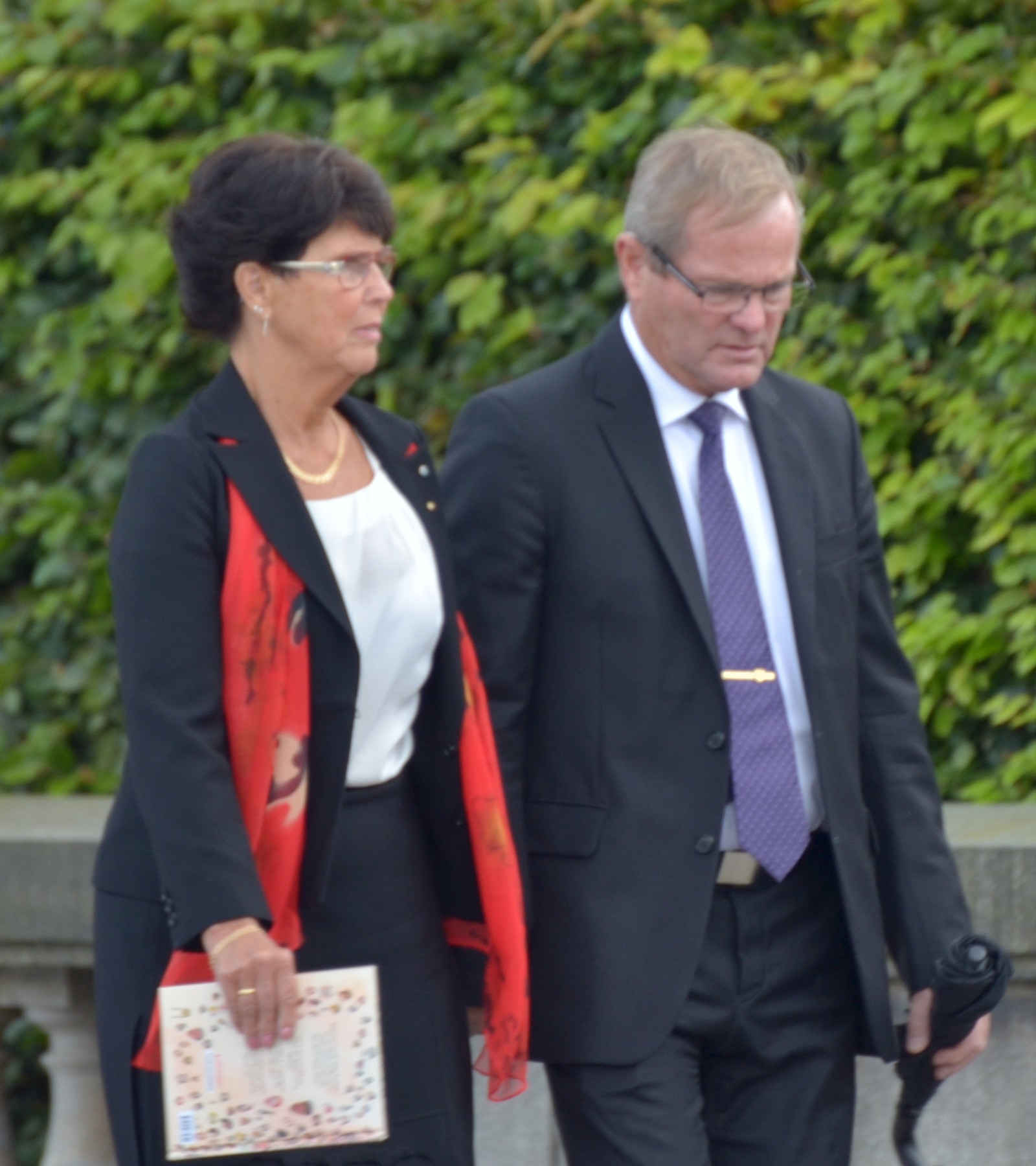
A picture of Yvonne Andersson

Yvonne Andersson, born 1951, is a Swedish Christian democratic politician. She was especially active in academic debates. She has been a member of the Riksdag from 1998 to 2014.
