= Sonia Karlsson =

Swedish politician (born 1946)

Sonia Karlsson (born 1946) is a Swedish social democratic politician who has been a member of the Riksdag since 1988.
