= Berndt Sköldestig =

Swedish politician (1944–2006)

Berndt Sköldestig (1944–2006) is a Swedish social democratic politician, member of the Riksdag 1998–2006.
