= 2021 Swedish government formation =

Formation of Swedish government

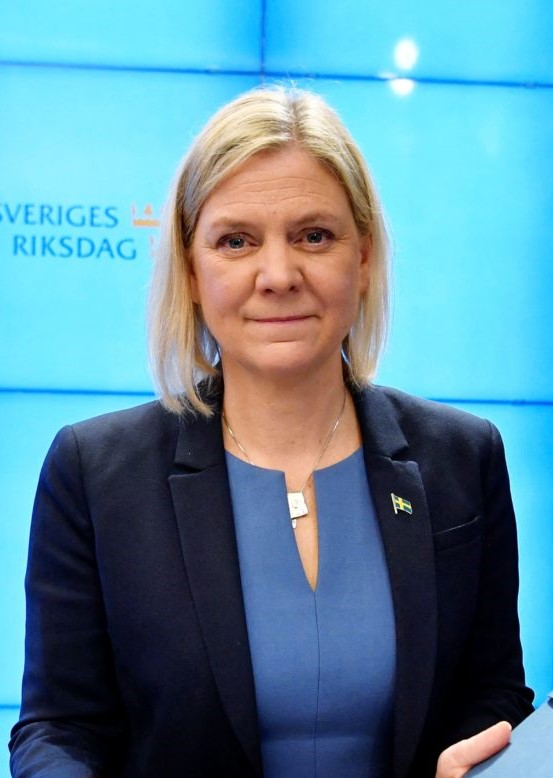
- Elected Prime Minister Magdalena Andersson
- Date: 11–30 November 2021
- Type: Parliamentary government formation
- Cause: Resignation of Prime Minister Stefan Löfven
- Participants: Social Democrats (S); Moderate Party (M); Sweden Democrats (SD); Centre Party (C); Left Party (V); Christian Democrats (KD); Liberals (L); Green Party (MP)
- Outcome: Magdalena Andersson is elected prime minister for an S–MP government tolerated by C and V; M, SD, and KD's 2022 budget passes; MP leaves the government; Andersson resigns; The Riksdag elects Andersson as prime minister again; Andersson forms the S Andersson cabinet tolerated by C, V, and MP and takes office

Prime Minister Stefan Löfven tendered his resignation on 10 November 2021, leaving the Löfven III cabinet in place as a caretaker government until a new prime minister was elected by the Riksdag. Government formation talks commenced the following day with Magdalena Andersson, the newly-elected head of the Social Democrats, offering to lead a government. She was formally nominated to form a government by the Speaker of the Riksdag, Andreas Norlén, later the same day. This was the third government formation process since the 2018 general election, the first one taking a record 134 days before the formation of the Löfven II cabinet and the second one taking place just four months before this one, as a result of the 2021 government crisis. This government formation process took place just 10 months ahead of the 2022 general election.

Andersson was elected Prime Minister the first time on 24 November and was expected to have appointed the ministers of a Social Democratic and Green coalition government by 26 November. The same day, however, the government-authored budget was voted down in the Riksdag, with the right-wing opposition's proposal passing instead. This led to the Green Party leaving the government and Andersson resigning as Prime Minister before taking office. She was elected a second time on 29 November and formed the Social Democratic single-party Andersson cabinet the day after.

== Constitutional context ==
=== Election of Prime Minister ===
The Swedish constitution creates a system known as "negative parliamentarianism", wherein "a prime ministerial candidate does not need to have the support of a majority, they only need to show that they do not have a majority of parliament (175 members) against them." In other words, the vote of confidence in Sweden is in practice a vote of no confidence, wherein the burden of proof is on the opposition. Political parties can symbolically "abstain" from the vote, which in practice acts as a yes vote and shows that the party tolerates, or tacitly approves, a government formation without the obligations that come with outright support. Thus, the status quo is to seek a government agreement that is tolerable by a majority of the parties, rather than a polarizing agreement that is liked by one side and hated by the other.

Speaker Andreas Norlén had given Magdalena Andersson the sonderingsuppdrag, which effectively meant that she was tasked with examining the possibility of forming a government led by herself. She was given a one-week (extendable) deadline to return with a result. If viable, the Speaker may then opt to formally nominate her as the prime ministerial candidate and a vote in the Riksdag will commence. If Andersson was unable to form a government, the Speaker may give the task to another Member of Parliament (the norm is to pick one of the party leaders). The Speaker may propose four Prime Ministerial candidates before a mandatory snap election is called.

=== Budget vote ===
In conjunction with the government formation process, the state budget for 2022 was set to be decided on by the Riksdag. During a budget vote, the budget proposals with the least amount of expected support are put forward against the budget of the government, if both fail, the government's budget will be put up against the budget with the greatest support, in this case the proposal of the opposition. Negative parliamentarism is not applied in this case, a simple majority is sufficient for a budget proposal to pass. Until 2014, the norm had been to abstain at the vote of the final proposal, but this practice has fallen out of use, since.

== Parliamentary situation ==
=== Background ===
In the September 2018 Swedish general election, no political group or party won an outright majority, resulting in a hung parliament. The centre-left Red-Greens, led by incumbent Prime Minister Stefan Löfven's Social Democrats, held 144 seats in the Riksdag, while the centre-right Alliance led by Ulf Kristersson's Moderate Party held 143. The right-wing populist party Sweden Democrats, led by Jimmie Åkesson, came in third. As a result, protracted negotiations were required before a new government could be formed. Eventually, the January Agreement was reached between the Social Democrats, Centre Party, Liberals, and Green Party. In January 2019, Löfven was re-elected as prime minister and formed the Social Democratic and Green Löfven II cabinet tolerated by the Centre Party, Left Party, and Liberals.

Two and a half years later, Löfven was ousted in a motion of no confidence over a January Agreement bill that would liberalise the rent control system, causing the summer of 2021 Swedish government crisis. The crisis resulted in the Centre Party abandoning their demand to end rent control, the Liberals leaving the basis for the Löfven II cabinet, and Löfven being re-elected as prime minister for the Social Democratic and Green Löfven III cabinet, now tolerated only by the Centre Party and Left Party.

Less than two months later, in August 2021, Löfven announced that he planned to step down as party leader and prime minister. At that point, he had been party leader for 10 years and prime minister for seven. He had originally planned to lead the Social Democrats through the 2022 general election, but decided it was best for his party if it entered the election campaign with a leader the voters knew would stay for a long time. On 4 November, Magdalena Andersson was elected new leader of the Social Democrats. On 10 November, Löfven tendered his resignation as prime minister and the Löfven III cabinet became a caretaker government. The next day, Andersson began talks to form a new government.

=== Distribution of seats in the Riksdag ===
The table below lists the parties' representation in the Riksdag as of 11 November 2021, when the government formation began.

Name		Leader	Seats
S	Social Democrats; Socialdemokraterna	Magdalena Andersson	100
M	Moderate Party; Moderaterna	Ulf Kristersson	70
SD	Sweden Democrats; Sverigedemokraterna	Jimmie Åkesson	62
C	Centre Party; Centerpartiet	Annie Lööf	31
V	Left Party; Vänsterpartiet	Nooshi Dadgostar	27
KD	Christian Democrats; Kristdemokraterna	Ebba Busch	22
L	Liberals; Liberalerna	Nyamko Sabuni	20
MP	Green Party; Miljöpartiet	Per Bolund; Märta Stenevi	16
–	Independent	–	1

== Formation process ==
=== Formation talks ===
The leader of the opposition, Moderate leader Ulf Kristersson did not find a right-wing government led by himself feasible, but his party would vote against a Social Democratic-led government. As would the Christian Democrats and the Sweden Democrats.

A recent change in policy within the Liberals to support only a right-wing government alternative, even one that relies on the support of the Sweden Democrats, ruled out the possibility of Liberal support for Andersson. The only possibilities for cooperation for the Social Democrats and Green Party lied with the Centre Party and the Left Party. Support from both parties would be required in order to elect Andersson and pass a budget.

Annie Lööf, the leader of the Centre Party, had already expressed her party's willingness to tolerate a government led by Andersson. Nooshi Dadgostar of the Left Party had demanded negotiations regarding increased pensions before tolerating an Andersson-led government.

On 22 November, Speaker Norlén officially nominated Andersson as prime minister, with a confirmation vote scheduled for two days later. On the evening of 23 November, the day before the vote on Andersson, the intended coalition parties of an Andersson-led government Social Democrats and Green Party struck a deal with the Left Party to increase the lower limit of the guaranteed pension for the unemployed. The new rules were expected to start in September 2022, if the proposal was approved by the Riksdag. The deal also resulted in a statement that the Left Party would act confidence and supply to the potential new government and support their budget.

=== First Riksdag vote ===
In the Riksdag, as long as the Speaker's proposal for a new prime minister is not opposed by half of its members, the proposal is carried. Andersson was elected with only a slim minority voting against her (174 'no' votes out of 349 members). This made her the first female prime minister in Swedish history. One member of the Riksdag from the Left Party was absent during the vote.

24 November 2021 vote in the Riksdag
Party	Votes for	Votes against	Abstained	Absent
Social Democrats	100: Ann-Christin Ahlberg; Daniel Andersson; Johan Andersson; Denis Begic; Hannah Bergstedt; Patrik Björck; Heléne Björklund; Yasmine Bladelius; Marlene Burwick; Johan Büser; ClasGöran Carlsson; Gunilla Carlsson; Teresa Carvalho; Mikael Dahlqvist; Adnan Dibrani; Hans Ekström; Jamal El-Haj; Patrik Engström; Åsa Eriksson; Erik Ezelius; Kenneth G Forslund; Isak From; Marianne Fundahn; Roza Güclü Hedin; Elin Gustafsson; Monica Haider; Abraham Halef; Thomas Hammarberg; Johanna Haraldsson; Jörgen Hellman; Caroline Helmersson Olsson; Hans Hoff; Paula Holmqvist; Per-Arne Håkansson; Anna Johansson; Mattias Jonsson; Joakim Järrebring; Ida Karkiainen; Annelie Karlsson; Niklas Karlsson; Åsa Karlsson; Sultan Kayhan; Tomas Kronståhl; Serkan Köse; Diana Laitinen Carlsson; Gustaf Lantz; Dag Larsson; Hillevi Larsson; Lars Mejern Larsson; Malin Larsson; Rikard Larsson; Sanne Lennström; Teres Lindberg; Åsa Lindestam; Eva Lindh; Elin Lundgren; Fredrik Lundh Sammeli; Patrik Lundqvist; Petter Löberg; Johan Löfstrand; Magnus Manhammar; Ola Möller; Laila Naraghi; Pyry Niemi; Ingemar Nilsson; Jennie Nilsson; Kristina Nilsson; Pia Nilsson; Ingela Nylund Watz; Leif Nysmed; Carina Ohlsson; Solange Olame Bayibsa; Kalle Olsson; Jasenko Omanovic; Mattias Ottosson; Björn Petersson; Helén Pettersson; Lawen Redar; Azadeh Rojhan Gustafsson; Lena Rådström Baastad; Joakim Sandell; Markus Selin; Linus Sköld; Annika Strandhäll; Maria Strömkvist; Inge Ståhlgren; Gunilla Svantorp; Anna-Caren Sätherberg; Mathias Tegnér; Olle Thorell; Mattias Vepsä; Anna Vikström; Anna Wallentheim; Hanna Westerén; Åsa Westlund; Björn Wiechel; Mats Wiking; Carina Ödebrink; Paula Örn; Anders Österberg	0	0	0
Moderate Party	0	70: Ann-Sofie Alm; Jan R. Andersson; Alexandra Anstrell; Helena Antoni; Kristina Axén Olin; Hanif Bali; Lars Beckman; Sten Bergheden; Jörgen Berglund; Tobias Billström; Elisabeth Björnsdotter Rahm; Carl-Oskar Bohlin; Helena Bouveng; Katarina Brännström; Margareta Cederfelt; Åsa Coenraads; Mikael Damsgaard; Ida Drougge; Annicka Engblom; Karin Enström; Jan Ericson; Johan Forssell; Mats Green; Ann-Charlotte Hammar Johnsson; Anders Hansson; Ulrika Heindorff; Lars Hjälmered; Johan Hultberg; Marie-Louise Hänel Sandström; Kjell Jansson; Lars Jilmstad; Pål Jonson; David Josefsson; Ellen Juntti; Ulrika Jörgensen; Arin Karapet; Mattias Karlsson (i Luleå); Ulrika Karlsson; Ulf Kristersson; Ann-Sofie Lifvenhage; Marléne Lund Kopparklint; Betty Malmberg; Maria Malmer Stenergard; Josefin Malmqvist; Noria Manouchi; Louise Meijer; Lotta Olsson; Erik Ottoson; Lars Püss; Saila Quicklund; Edward Riedl; Jessica Rosencrantz; Jessika Roswall; Hans Rothenberg; Magdalena Schröder; Fredrik Schulte; Maria Stockhaus; Magnus Stuart; Elisabeth Svantesson; Cecilie Tenfjord Toftby; Hans Wallmark; Camilla Waltersson Grönvall; John Weinerhall; Sofia Westergren; Cecilia Widegren; John Widegren; Niklas Wykman; Viktor Wärnick; Boriana Åberg; Ann-Britt Åsebol	0	0
Sweden Democrats	0	62: Jonas Andersson i Linghem; Jonas Andersson i Skellefteå; Lars Andersson; Tobias Andersson; Clara Aranda; Ludvig Aspling; Angelika Bengtsson; Bo Broman; Mattias Bäckström Johansson; Alexander Christiansson; Dennis Dioukarev; Staffan Eklöf; Aron Emilsson; Matheus Enholm; Yasmine Eriksson; Mikael Eskilandersson; Runar Filper; Josef Fransson; Ann-Christine From Utterstedt; Sara Gille; Jörgen Grubb; Roger Hedlund; Ebba Hermansson; Richard Jomshof; Patrik Jönsson; Mattias Karlsson (i Norrhult); Martin Kinnunen; Julia Kronlid; Fredrik Lindahl; Linda Lindberg; Angelica Lundberg; David Lång; Adam Marttinen; Thomas Morell; Mats Nordberg; Caroline Nordengrip; Katja Nyberg; Anne Oskarsson; Eric Palmqvist; David Perez; Magnus Persson; Charlotte Quensel; Per Ramhorn; Patrick Reslow; Roger Richthoff; Michael Rubbestad; Oscar Sjöstedt; Johnny Skalin; Robert Stenkvist; Mikael Strandman; Carina Ståhl Herrstedt; Jimmy Ståhl; Cassandra Sundin; Sven-Olof Sällström; Björn Söder; Per Söderlund; Henrik Vinge; Eric Westroth; Markus Wiechel; Jennie Åfeldt; Jimmie Åkesson; Christina Östberg	0	0
Centre Party	0	0	31: Alireza Akhondi; Daniel Bäckström; Jonny Cato; Fredrik Christensson; Catarina Deremar; Magnus Ek; Johan Hedin; Ulrika Heie; Peter Helander; Martina Johansson; Ola Johansson; Anders W. Jonsson; Johanna Jönsson; Emil Källström; Mikael Larsson; Helena Lindahl; Per Lodenius; Kerstin Lundgren; Annie Lööf; Linda Modig; Sofia Nilsson; Rickard Nordin; Niels Paarup-Petersen; Annika Qarlsson; Per Schöldberg; Lars Thomsson; Helena Vilhelmsson; Kristina Yngwe; Martin Ådahl; Anders Åkesson; Per Åsling	0
Left Party	0	0	26: Ulla Andersson; Nooshi Dadgostar; Lorena Delgado Varas; Ali Esbati; Ida Gabrielsson; Hanna Gunnarsson; Tony Haddou; Jens Holm; Christina Höj Larsen; Momodou Malcolm Jallow; Lotta Johnsson Fornarve; Maj Karlsson; Birger Lahti; Gudrun Nordborg; Yasmine Posio; Daniel Riazat; Karin Rågsjö; Elin Segerlind; Mia Sydow Mölleby; Ilona Szatmari Waldau; Jon Thorbjörnson; Jessica Thunander; Vasiliki Tsouplaki; Ciczie Weidby; Linda Westerlund Snecker; Jessica Wetterling	1: Håkan Svenneling
Christian Democrats	0	22: Lars Adaktusson; Michael Anefur; Acko Ankarberg Johansson; Camilla Brodin; Gudrun Brunegård; Ebba Busch; Andreas Carlson; Christian Carlsson; Sofia Damm; Hans Eklind; Jakob Forssmed; Hampus Hagman; Robert Halef; Magnus Jacobsson; Ingemar Kihlström; Magnus Oscarsson; Mikael Oscarsson; Kjell-Arne Ottosson; Tuve Skånberg; Pia Steensland; Larry Söder; Roland Utbult	0	0
Liberals	0	20: Tina Acketoft; Gulan Avci; Juno Blom; Malin Danielsson; Bengt Eliasson; Joar Forssell; Helena Gellerman; Roger Haddad; Robert Hannah; Fredrik Malm; Maria Nilsson; Lina Nordquist; Christer Nylander; Johan Pehrson; Mats Persson; Arman Teimouri; Barbro Westerholm; Allan Widman; Nina Lundström; Jakob Olofsgård	0	0
Green Party	16: Leila Ali-Elmi; Nicklas Attefjord; Emma Berginger; Mats Berglund; Elisabeth Falkhaven; Maria Gardfjell; Camilla Hansén; Annika Hirvonen; Emma Hult; Rebecka Le Moine; Rasmus Ling; Amanda Palmstierna; Anna Sibinska; Karolina Skog; Pernilla Stålhammar; Lorentz Tovatt	0	0	0
Independent	1: Amineh Kakabaveh	0	0	0
Total	117	174	57	1

=== Budget vote ===
Following the agreement between the Left Party and Andersson, the Centre Party announced that they would not be supporting the government's budget proposal at the budget vote on 24 November. As expected, the government-authored budget proposal was voted down in the Riksdag. The 2022 budget was based on the joint proposal of the right-wing opposition parties: the Moderates, Sweden Democrats and the Christian Democrats. Andersson had stated that she would be willing to govern despite an opposition-authored budget. Unwilling to help implement policy negotiated by the Sweden Democrats, the Green Party announced that they would leave the government cooperation shortly after the budget vote. With the Greens no longer a part of Andersson's proposed coalition, a new vote to elect a Prime Minister would likely have to be held.

The opposition's budget proposal was a modified version of the government's that includes lower taxes for working people and retirees, lower fuel taxes, increased salaries for police employees and the cutting of the government's proposed funding for a family week, forest protection and housing subsidies.

24 November 2021 opposition budget vote in the Riksdag
Party	Votes for	Votes against	Abstained	Absent
Social Democrats	0	100: Ann-Christin Ahlberg; Daniel Andersson; Johan Andersson; Denis Begic; Hannah Bergstedt; Patrik Björck; Heléne Björklund; Yasmine Bladelius; Marlene Burwick; Johan Büser; ClasGöran Carlsson; Gunilla Carlsson; Teresa Carvalho; Mikael Dahlqvist; Adnan Dibrani; Hans Ekström; Jamal El-Haj; Patrik Engström; Åsa Eriksson; Erik Ezelius; Kenneth G Forslund; Isak From; Marianne Fundahn; Roza Güclü Hedin; Elin Gustafsson; Monica Haider; Abraham Halef; Thomas Hammarberg; Johanna Haraldsson; Jörgen Hellman; Caroline Helmersson Olsson; Hans Hoff; Paula Holmqvist; Per-Arne Håkansson; Anna Johansson; Mattias Jonsson; Joakim Järrebring; Ida Karkiainen; Annelie Karlsson; Niklas Karlsson; Åsa Karlsson; Sultan Kayhan; Tomas Kronståhl; Serkan Köse; Diana Laitinen Carlsson; Gustaf Lantz; Dag Larsson; Hillevi Larsson; Lars Mejern Larsson; Malin Larsson; Rikard Larsson; Sanne Lennström; Teres Lindberg; Åsa Lindestam; Eva Lindh; Elin Lundgren; Fredrik Lundh Sammeli; Patrik Lundqvist; Petter Löberg; Johan Löfstrand; Magnus Manhammar; Ola Möller; Laila Naraghi; Pyry Niemi; Ingemar Nilsson; Jennie Nilsson; Kristina Nilsson; Pia Nilsson; Ingela Nylund Watz; Leif Nysmed; Carina Ohlsson; Solange Olame Bayibsa; Kalle Olsson; Jasenko Omanovic; Mattias Ottosson; Björn Petersson; Helén Pettersson; Lawen Redar; Azadeh Rojhan Gustafsson; Lena Rådström Baastad; Joakim Sandell; Markus Selin; Linus Sköld; Annika Strandhäll; Maria Strömkvist; Inge Ståhlgren; Gunilla Svantorp; Anna-Caren Sätherberg; Mathias Tegnér; Olle Thorell; Mattias Vepsä; Anna Vikström; Anna Wallentheim; Hanna Westerén; Åsa Westlund; Björn Wiechel; Mats Wiking; Carina Ödebrink; Paula Örn; Anders Österberg	0	0
Moderate Party	70: Ann-Sofie Alm; Jan R. Andersson; Alexandra Anstrell; Helena Antoni; Kristina Axén Olin; Hanif Bali; Lars Beckman; Sten Bergheden; Jörgen Berglund; Tobias Billström; Elisabeth Björnsdotter Rahm; Carl-Oskar Bohlin; Helena Bouveng; Katarina Brännström; Margareta Cederfelt; Åsa Coenraads; Mikael Damsgaard; Ida Drougge; Annicka Engblom; Karin Enström; Jan Ericson; Johan Forssell; Mats Green; Ann-Charlotte Hammar Johnsson; Anders Hansson; Ulrika Heindorff; Lars Hjälmered; Johan Hultberg; Marie-Louise Hänel Sandström; Kjell Jansson; Lars Jilmstad; Pål Jonson; David Josefsson; Ellen Juntti; Ulrika Jörgensen; Arin Karapet; Mattias Karlsson (i Luleå); Ulrika Karlsson; Ulf Kristersson; Ann-Sofie Lifvenhage; Marléne Lund Kopparklint; Betty Malmberg; Maria Malmer Stenergard; Josefin Malmqvist; Noria Manouchi; Louise Meijer; Lotta Olsson; Erik Ottoson; Lars Püss; Saila Quicklund; Edward Riedl; Jessica Rosencrantz; Jessika Roswall; Hans Rothenberg; Magdalena Schröder; Fredrik Schulte; Maria Stockhaus; Magnus Stuart; Elisabeth Svantesson; Cecilie Tenfjord Toftby; Hans Wallmark; Camilla Waltersson Grönvall; John Weinerhall; Sofia Westergren; Cecilia Widegren; John Widegren; Niklas Wykman; Viktor Wärnick; Boriana Åberg; Ann-Britt Åsebol	0	0	0
Sweden Democrats	62: Jonas Andersson i Linghem; Jonas Andersson i Skellefteå; Lars Andersson; Tobias Andersson; Clara Aranda; Ludvig Aspling; Angelika Bengtsson; Bo Broman; Mattias Bäckström Johansson; Alexander Christiansson; Dennis Dioukarev; Staffan Eklöf; Aron Emilsson; Matheus Enholm; Yasmine Eriksson; Mikael Eskilandersson; Runar Filper; Josef Fransson; Ann-Christine From Utterstedt; Sara Gille; Jörgen Grubb; Roger Hedlund; Ebba Hermansson; Richard Jomshof; Patrik Jönsson; Mattias Karlsson (i Norrhult); Martin Kinnunen; Julia Kronlid; Fredrik Lindahl; Linda Lindberg; Angelica Lundberg; David Lång; Adam Marttinen; Thomas Morell; Mats Nordberg; Caroline Nordengrip; Katja Nyberg; Anne Oskarsson; Eric Palmqvist; David Perez; Magnus Persson; Charlotte Quensel; Per Ramhorn; Patrick Reslow; Roger Richthoff; Michael Rubbestad; Oscar Sjöstedt; Johnny Skalin; Robert Stenkvist; Mikael Strandman; Carina Ståhl Herrstedt; Jimmy Ståhl; Cassandra Sundin; Sven-Olof Sällström; Björn Söder; Per Söderlund; Henrik Vinge; Eric Westroth; Markus Wiechel; Jennie Åfeldt; Jimmie Åkesson; Christina Östberg	0	0	0
Centre Party	0	0	31: Alireza Akhondi; Daniel Bäckström; Jonny Cato; Fredrik Christensson; Catarina Deremar; Magnus Ek; Johan Hedin; Ulrika Heie; Peter Helander; Martina Johansson; Ola Johansson; Anders W. Jonsson; Johanna Jönsson; Emil Källström; Mikael Larsson; Helena Lindahl; Per Lodenius; Kerstin Lundgren; Annie Lööf; Linda Modig; Sofia Nilsson; Rickard Nordin; Niels Paarup-Petersen; Annika Qarlsson; Per Schöldberg; Lars Thomsson; Helena Vilhelmsson; Kristina Yngwe; Martin Ådahl; Anders Åkesson; Per Åsling	0
Left Party	0	26: Ulla Andersson; Nooshi Dadgostar; Lorena Delgado Varas; Ali Esbati; Ida Gabrielsson; Hanna Gunnarsson; Tony Haddou; Jens Holm; Christina Höj Larsen; Momodou Malcolm Jallow; Lotta Johnsson Fornarve; Maj Karlsson; Birger Lahti; Gudrun Nordborg; Yasmine Posio; Daniel Riazat; Karin Rågsjö; Elin Segerlind; Mia Sydow Mölleby; Ilona Szatmari Waldau; Jon Thorbjörnson; Jessica Thunander; Vasiliki Tsouplaki; Ciczie Weidby; Linda Westerlund Snecker; Jessica Wetterling	0	1: Håkan Svenneling
Christian Democrats	22: Lars Adaktusson; Michael Anefur; Acko Ankarberg Johansson; Camilla Brodin; Gudrun Brunegård; Ebba Busch; Andreas Carlson; Christian Carlsson; Sofia Damm; Hans Eklind; Jakob Forssmed; Hampus Hagman; Robert Halef; Magnus Jacobsson; Ingemar Kihlström; Magnus Oscarsson; Mikael Oscarsson; Kjell-Arne Ottosson; Tuve Skånberg; Pia Steensland; Larry Söder; Roland Utbult	0	0	0
Liberals	0	0	20: Tina Acketoft; Gulan Avci; Juno Blom; Malin Danielsson; Bengt Eliasson; Joar Forssell; Helena Gellerman; Roger Haddad; Robert Hannah; Fredrik Malm; Maria Nilsson; Lina Nordquist; Christer Nylander; Johan Pehrson; Mats Persson; Arman Teimouri; Barbro Westerholm; Allan Widman; Nina Lundström; Jakob Olofsgård	0
Green Party	0	16: Leila Ali-Elmi; Nicklas Attefjord; Emma Berginger; Mats Berglund; Elisabeth Falkhaven; Maria Gardfjell; Camilla Hansén; Annika Hirvonen; Emma Hult; Rebecka Le Moine; Rasmus Ling; Amanda Palmstierna; Anna Sibinska; Karolina Skog; Pernilla Stålhammar; Lorentz Tovatt	0	0
Independent	0	1: Amineh Kakabaveh	0	0
Total	154	143	51	1

=== Andersson's resignation ===
After losing the support of the Green Party in government, Andersson asked to resign her post as prime minister, just seven hours after being elected and before taking office. Stefan Löfven remained in office until a replacement could take office.

On the evening of 24 November, the Green Party, the Left Party and the Centre Party had all publicly said they would abstain from voting against a single-party Andersson cabinet, in a potential upcoming vote in the Riksdag. Together with the support of independent parliament member Amineh Kakabaveh, Andersson was re-elected Prime Minister. In Sweden, a proposal is approved as long as less than half of the parliament members vote against it.

=== Second Riksdag vote ===
Andersson was finally elected on 29 November with 101 voting yes, 75 abstaining and 173 voting no; of the 349 total.

29 November 2021 vote in the Riksdag
Party	Votes for	Votes against	Abstained	Absent
Social Democrats	100: Ann-Christin Ahlberg; Daniel Andersson; Johan Andersson; Denis Begic; Hannah Bergstedt; Patrik Björck; Heléne Björklund; Yasmine Bladelius; Marlene Burwick; Johan Büser; ClasGöran Carlsson; Gunilla Carlsson; Teresa Carvalho; Mikael Dahlqvist; Adnan Dibrani; Hans Ekström; Jamal El-Haj; Patrik Engström; Åsa Eriksson; Erik Ezelius; Kenneth G Forslund; Isak From; Marianne Fundahn; Roza Güclü Hedin; Elin Gustafsson; Monica Haider; Abraham Halef; Thomas Hammarberg; Johanna Haraldsson; Jörgen Hellman; Caroline Helmersson Olsson; Hans Hoff; Paula Holmqvist; Per-Arne Håkansson; Anna Johansson; Mattias Jonsson; Joakim Järrebring; Ida Karkiainen; Annelie Karlsson; Niklas Karlsson; Åsa Karlsson; Sultan Kayhan; Tomas Kronståhl; Serkan Köse; Diana Laitinen Carlsson; Gustaf Lantz; Dag Larsson; Hillevi Larsson; Lars Mejern Larsson; Malin Larsson; Rikard Larsson; Sanne Lennström; Teres Lindberg; Åsa Lindestam; Eva Lindh; Elin Lundgren; Fredrik Lundh Sammeli; Patrik Lundqvist; Petter Löberg; Johan Löfstrand; Magnus Manhammar; Ola Möller; Laila Naraghi; Pyry Niemi; Ingemar Nilsson; Jennie Nilsson; Kristina Nilsson; Pia Nilsson; Ingela Nylund Watz; Leif Nysmed; Carina Ohlsson; Solange Olame Bayibsa; Kalle Olsson; Jasenko Omanovic; Mattias Ottosson; Björn Petersson; Helén Pettersson; Lawen Redar; Azadeh Rojhan Gustafsson; Lena Rådström Baastad; Joakim Sandell; Markus Selin; Linus Sköld; Annika Strandhäll; Maria Strömkvist; Inge Ståhlgren; Gunilla Svantorp; Anna-Caren Sätherberg; Mathias Tegnér; Olle Thorell; Mattias Vepsä; Anna Vikström; Anna Wallentheim; Hanna Westerén; Åsa Westlund; Björn Wiechel; Mats Wiking; Carina Ödebrink; Paula Örn; Anders Österberg	0	0	0
Moderate Party	0	70: Ann-Sofie Alm; Jan R. Andersson; Alexandra Anstrell; Helena Antoni; Kristina Axén Olin; Hanif Bali; Lars Beckman; Sten Bergheden; Jörgen Berglund; Tobias Billström; Elisabeth Björnsdotter Rahm; Carl-Oskar Bohlin; Helena Bouveng; Katarina Brännström; Margareta Cederfelt; Åsa Coenraads; Mikael Damsgaard; Ida Drougge; Annicka Engblom; Karin Enström; Jan Ericson; Johan Forssell; Mats Green; Ann-Charlotte Hammar Johnsson; Anders Hansson; Ulrika Heindorff; Lars Hjälmered; Johan Hultberg; Marie-Louise Hänel Sandström; Kjell Jansson; Lars Jilmstad; Pål Jonson; David Josefsson; Ellen Juntti; Ulrika Jörgensen; Arin Karapet; Mattias Karlsson (i Luleå); Ulrika Karlsson; Ulf Kristersson; Ann-Sofie Lifvenhage; Marléne Lund Kopparklint; Betty Malmberg; Maria Malmer Stenergard; Josefin Malmqvist; Noria Manouchi; Louise Meijer; Lotta Olsson; Erik Ottoson; Lars Püss; Saila Quicklund; Edward Riedl; Jessica Rosencrantz; Jessika Roswall; Hans Rothenberg; Magdalena Schröder; Fredrik Schulte; Maria Stockhaus; Magnus Stuart; Elisabeth Svantesson; Cecilie Tenfjord Toftby; Hans Wallmark; Camilla Waltersson Grönvall; John Weinerhall; Sofia Westergren; Cecilia Widegren; John Widegren; Niklas Wykman; Viktor Wärnick; Boriana Åberg; Ann-Britt Åsebol	0	0
Sweden Democrats	0	62: Jonas Andersson i Linghem; Jonas Andersson i Skellefteå; Lars Andersson; Tobias Andersson; Clara Aranda; Ludvig Aspling; Angelika Bengtsson; Bo Broman; Mattias Bäckström Johansson; Alexander Christiansson; Dennis Dioukarev; Staffan Eklöf; Aron Emilsson; Matheus Enholm; Yasmine Eriksson; Mikael Eskilandersson; Runar Filper; Josef Fransson; Ann-Christine From Utterstedt; Sara Gille; Jörgen Grubb; Roger Hedlund; Ebba Hermansson; Richard Jomshof; Patrik Jönsson; Mattias Karlsson (i Norrhult); Martin Kinnunen; Julia Kronlid; Fredrik Lindahl; Linda Lindberg; Angelica Lundberg; David Lång; Adam Marttinen; Thomas Morell; Mats Nordberg; Caroline Nordengrip; Katja Nyberg; Anne Oskarsson; Eric Palmqvist; David Perez; Magnus Persson; Charlotte Quensel; Per Ramhorn; Patrick Reslow; Roger Richthoff; Michael Rubbestad; Oscar Sjöstedt; Johnny Skalin; Robert Stenkvist; Mikael Strandman; Carina Ståhl Herrstedt; Jimmy Ståhl; Cassandra Sundin; Sven-Olof Sällström; Björn Söder; Per Söderlund; Henrik Vinge; Eric Westroth; Markus Wiechel; Jennie Åfeldt; Jimmie Åkesson; Christina Östberg	0	0
Centre Party	0	0	31: Alireza Akhondi; Daniel Bäckström; Jonny Cato; Fredrik Christensson; Catarina Deremar; Magnus Ek; Johan Hedin; Ulrika Heie; Peter Helander; Martina Johansson; Ola Johansson; Anders W. Jonsson; Johanna Jönsson; Emil Källström; Mikael Larsson; Helena Lindahl; Per Lodenius; Kerstin Lundgren; Annie Lööf; Linda Modig; Sofia Nilsson; Rickard Nordin; Niels Paarup-Petersen; Annika Qarlsson; Per Schöldberg; Lars Thomsson; Helena Vilhelmsson; Kristina Yngwe; Martin Ådahl; Anders Åkesson; Per Åsling	0
Left Party	0	0	27: Ulla Andersson; Nooshi Dadgostar; Lorena Delgado Varas; Ali Esbati; Ida Gabrielsson; Hanna Gunnarsson; Tony Haddou; Jens Holm; Christina Höj Larsen; Momodou Malcolm Jallow; Lotta Johnsson Fornarve; Maj Karlsson; Birger Lahti; Gudrun Nordborg; Yasmine Posio; Daniel Riazat; Karin Rågsjö; Elin Segerlind; Mia Sydow Mölleby; Ilona Szatmari Waldau; Jon Thorbjörnson; Jessica Thunander; Vasiliki Tsouplaki; Ciczie Weidby; Linda Westerlund Snecker; Jessica Wetterling; Håkan Svenneling	0
Christian Democrats	0	22: Lars Adaktusson; Michael Anefur; Acko Ankarberg Johansson; Camilla Brodin; Gudrun Brunegård; Ebba Busch; Andreas Carlson; Christian Carlsson; Sofia Damm; Hans Eklind; Jakob Forssmed; Hampus Hagman; Robert Halef; Magnus Jacobsson; Ingemar Kihlström; Magnus Oscarsson; Mikael Oscarsson; Kjell-Arne Ottosson; Tuve Skånberg; Pia Steensland; Larry Söder; Roland Utbult	0	0
Liberals	0	19: Tina Acketoft; Gulan Avci; Juno Blom; Malin Danielsson; Bengt Eliasson; Joar Forssell; Helena Gellerman; Roger Haddad; Robert Hannah; Fredrik Malm; Maria Nilsson; Lina Nordquist; Christer Nylander; Johan Pehrson; Mats Persson; Arman Teimouri; Barbro Westerholm; Allan Widman; Jakob Olofsgård	1: Nina Lundström	0
Green Party	0	0	16: Leila Ali-Elmi; Nicklas Attefjord; Emma Berginger; Mats Berglund; Elisabeth Falkhaven; Maria Gardfjell; Camilla Hansén; Annika Hirvonen; Emma Hult; Rebecka Le Moine; Rasmus Ling; Amanda Palmstierna; Anna Sibinska; Karolina Skog; Pernilla Stålhammar; Lorentz Tovatt	0
Independent	1: Amineh Kakabaveh	0	0	0
Total	101	173	75	0
Total	28.94%	49.57%	21.49%	0.00%

== See also ==
- 2018–2019 Swedish government formation
- 2021 Swedish government crisis
- 2026 Swedish government formation
