= Swedish government formation =

Swedish government formation may refer to:

- 2018–2019 Swedish government formation
- 2021 Swedish government formation
