= Eric Westroth =

Swedish politician (born 1971)

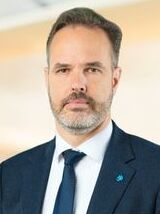

Member of the Riksdag
- Incumbent
- Assumed office 2018
- Constituency: Halland County

Personal details
- Born: 31 March 1971 (age 55) Älghult, Sweden
- Party: Sweden Democrats
- Education: Swedish Air Force Flying School
- Occupation: Entrepreneur, politician

Eric Westroth (born 1971) is a Swedish business entrepreneur and politician for the Sweden Democrats who has served as a member of the Riksdag since 2018.

== Biography ==
=== Early life ===
Westroth was born in Älghult in 1971. He graduated with qualifications in engineering from the Technical High School in Gislaved and the Swedish Air Force Flying School School of Engineering. He became an entrepreneur and the owner of a furniture manufacturing company Westroth AB in Kulltorp.

=== Political career ===
Westroth is a member of the Sweden Democrats district board and the party finance officer in Jönköping County. Westroth was elected to the Riksdag in 2018 and takes seat 126 for the Halland County constituency. In parliament, he serves as a deputy on the EU Committee and was the spokesman for both the Sweden Democrats and the European Conservatives and Reformists group at the Stability, Economic Coordination and Governance in the European Union in Berlin 2020.
