= Jennie Åfeldt =

Swedish politician (born 1974)

Member of the Riksdag
- In office 26 September 2014 – 9 September 2018
- Constituency: Malmö Municipality
- Incumbent
- Assumed office 9 September 2018
- Constituency: Skåne Southern

Personal details
- Born: 30 August 1974 (age 51) Bromölla, Skåne County, Sweden
- Party: Sweden Democrats

Jennie Linda Marie Åfeldt (born 30 August 1974) is a Swedish politician who has served in the Riksdag since 2014 as a member of the Sweden Democrats.

In parliament, Åfeldt has sat on the Committee on the Environment, Public Health and Consumer Policy and the Social Affairs Committee. Along with fellow SD politician Christina Östberg, she has campaigned for drug reform and tough policies against substance addiction. In 2015, Åfeldt was a victim of identity theft and compromised parliamentary security when a perpetrator broke into her hotel room in Malmö and stole all of her identification documents.
