= Thomas Morell (politician) =

Swedish politician (born 1957)

Thomas Morell SD M
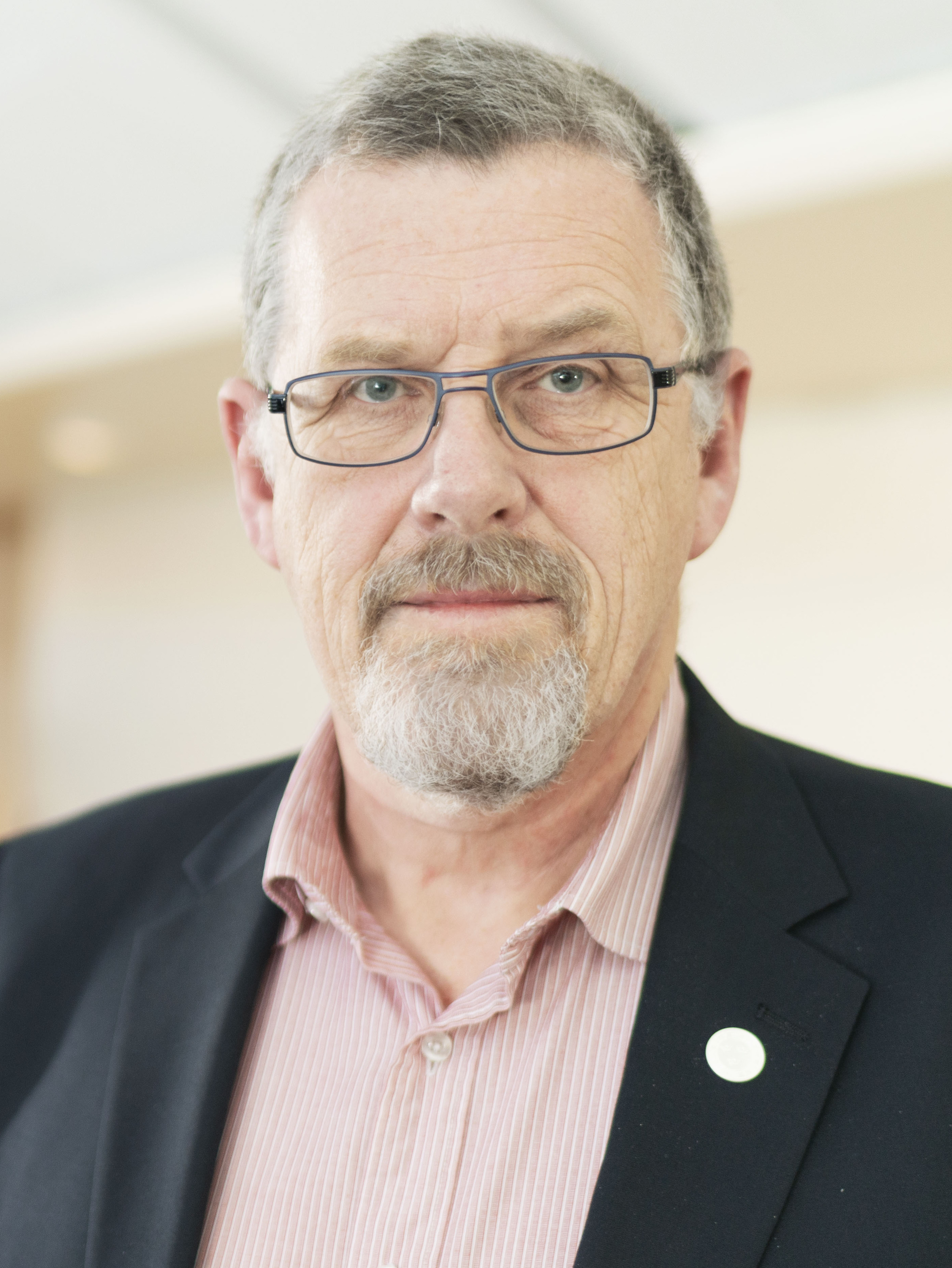

Member of the Riksdag for Gävleborg County constituency
- Incumbent
- Assumed office 2018

Personal details
- Born: 1957 (age 68–69)
- Party: Sweden Democrats (2017–present); Moderate Party (before 2017)
- Occupation: Politician

Thomas Morell (born 1957) is a Swedish politician and member of the Riksdag for the Sweden Democrats.

Morell worked for the Swedish Police Authority in traffic regulation before joining the Swedish Association of Road Transport Companies as a regional manager. He was a member and supporter of the Moderate Party before switching allegiances to the Sweden Democrats in 2017. During the 2018 Swedish general election, Morell was elected to parliament for the Gävleborg County constituency and takes seat 346. He sits on the Transport and Industry Committees in the Riksdag. In parliament, Morell also focuses on matters related to illegal commercial traffic such as weapons and drugs smuggling.
