= Yasmine Posio =

Swedish politician (born 1974)

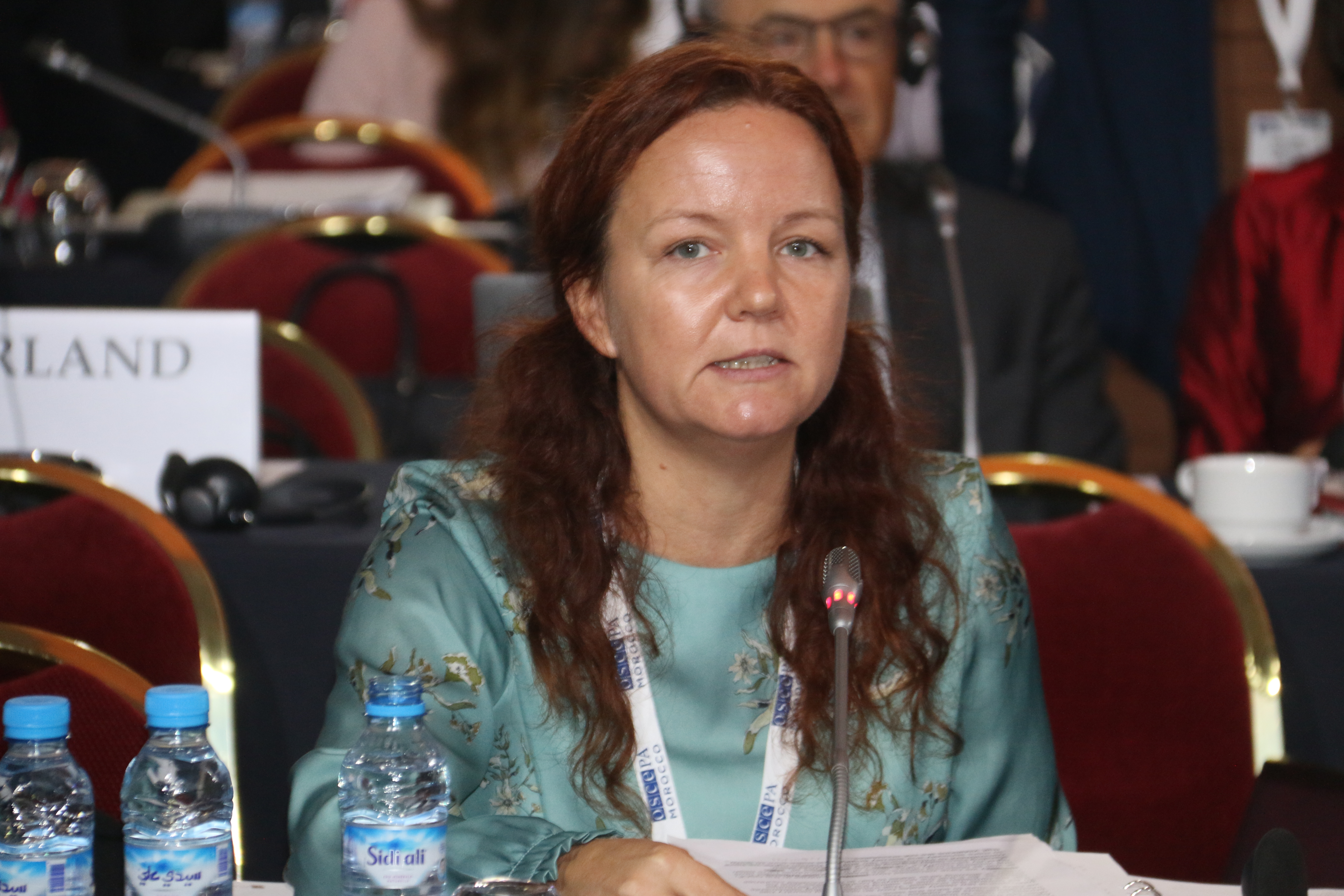
- Posio in October 2019

Member of the Riksdag
- In office 7 June 2017 – 26 September 2022
- Preceded by: Hans Linde
- Constituency: Gothenburg Municipality

Personal details
- Born: 1974 (age 51–52)
- Party: Left Party

Linda Yasmine Posio (born 1974) is a Swedish politician and former member of the Riksdag, the national legislature. A member of the Left Party, she represented Gothenburg Municipality between June 2017 and September 2022.

Posio is the daughter of carpenter Esa Mertala and administrator Marja-Leena Posio. She trained to be a teacher. She has held numerous jobs including caretaker, kitchen assistant, au-pair, warehouse worker, truck driver and teacher. She was a member of the municipal council in Gothenburg Municipality from 2014 to 2017.
