= Marlene Burwick =

Swedish politician (born 1971)

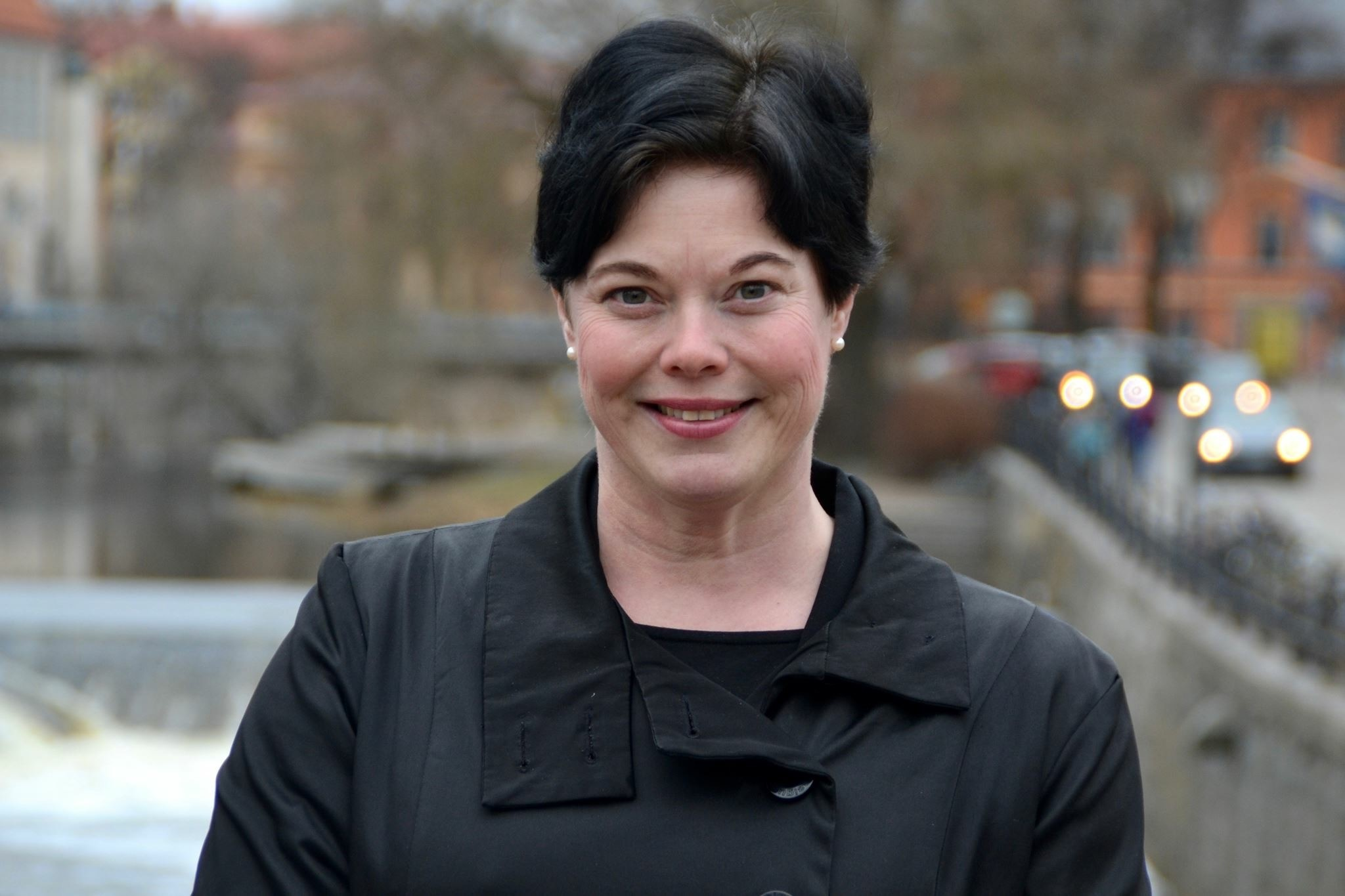

Member of the Riksdag
- In office 24 September 2018 – 26 September 2022
- Constituency: Uppsala County

Personal details
- Born: 23 June 1971 (age 54)
- Party: Social Democrats

Marlene Kristina Burwick (born 23 June 1971) is a Swedish politician. From September 2018 to September 2022, she served as a Member of the Riksdag representing the constituency of Uppsala County. She is a trained chemist by profession.
