= John Widegren =

Swedish politician (born 1980)

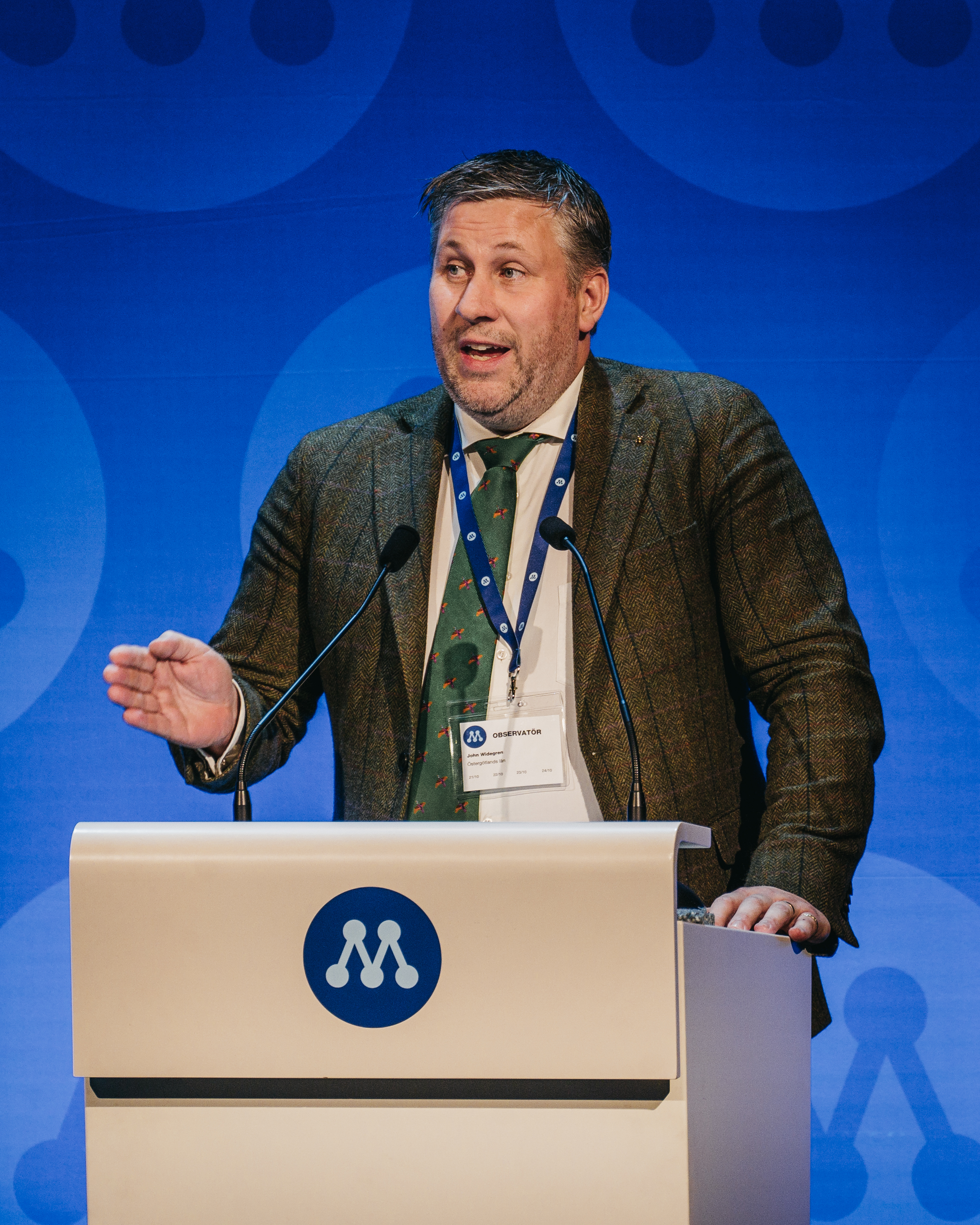
- John Widegren in 2021

Member of the Riksdag
- Incumbent
- Assumed office 9 September 2018
- Constituency: Östergötland County

Personal details
- Born: 4 February 1980 (age 46) Östergötland County, Sweden
- Party: Moderate Party
- Relations: Cecilia Widegren (cousin)

John Erik Tommy Widegren (born 4 February 1980) is a Swedish politician from the Moderate Party who was elected a member of parliament for Östergötland County in 2018 and 2022. He is retiring at the 2026 Swedish general election.

== See also ==
- List of members of the Riksdag, 2018–2022
- List of members of the Riksdag, 2022–2026
