= Serkan Köse =

Swedish politician (born 1976)

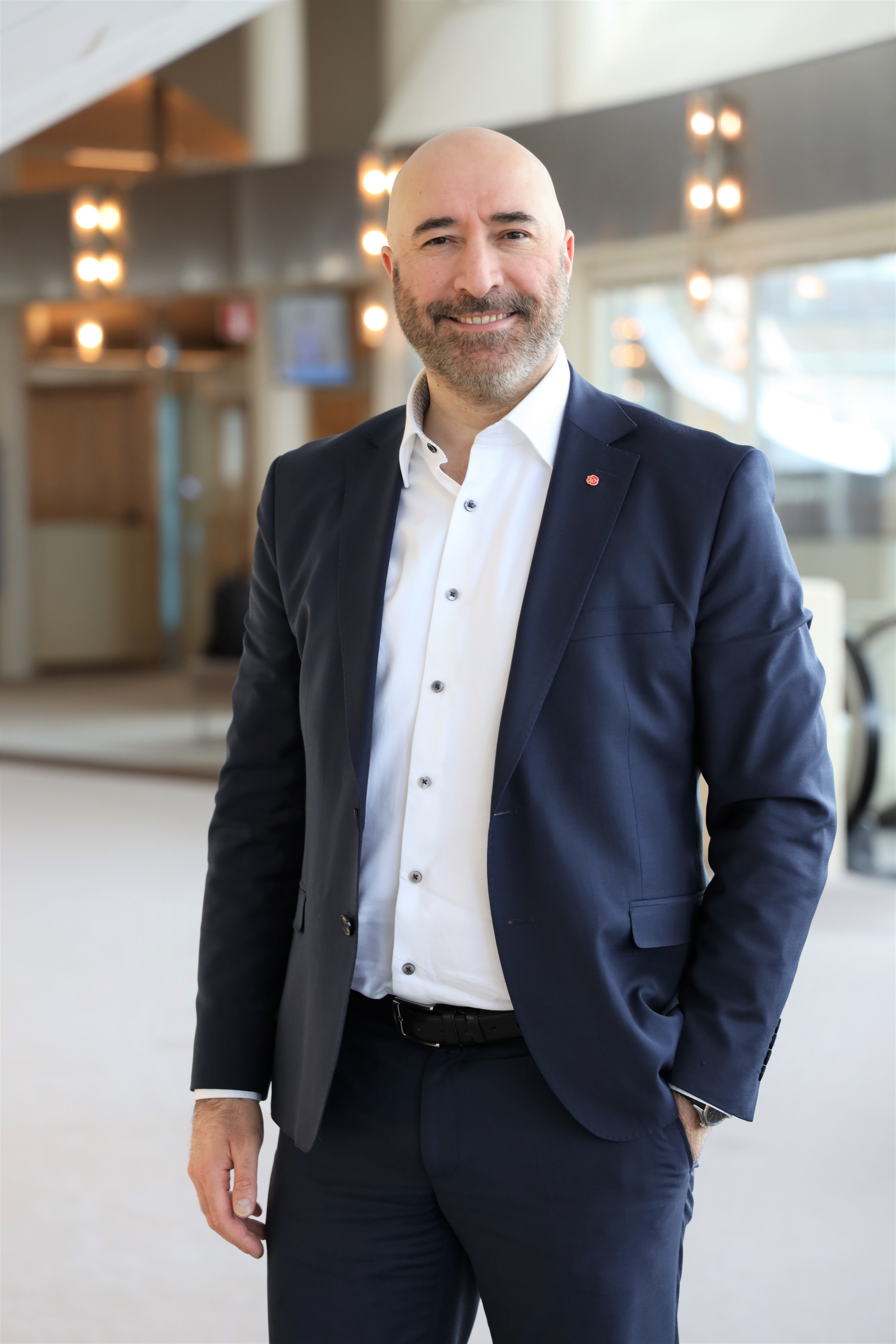
- Köse in April 2021

Member of the Riksdag
- Incumbent
- Assumed office 24 September 2018
- Constituency: Stockholm County

Personal details
- Born: Serkan Köse; 1976 (age 49–50)
- Party: Social Democratic Party
- Education: Stockholm University

Serkan Köse (born 1976) is a Swedish politician and member of the Riksdag, the national legislature. A member of the Social Democratic Party, he has represented Stockholm County since September 2018. He had previously been a substitute member of the Riksdag for Magdalena Andersson twice: October 2014 to March 2017; and September 2017 to September 2018.

Köse is the son of Mehmet Köse and Ayse Köse. He is of Kurdish descent. He was educated in Botkyrka Municipality and studied at Stockholm University from where he has a Doctor of Philosophy degree in political science. He has been a member of the municipal council in Botkyrka Municipality since 2014.
