= Angelica Lundberg =

Swedish politician (born 1981)

Member of the Riksdag
- Incumbent
- Assumed office 2018
- Constituency: Jönköping County

Personal details
- Born: 1981 (age 44–45) Norrahammar
- Party: Sweden Democrats

Angelica Lundberg (born 1981) is a Swedish politician of the Sweden Democrats party who has been a member of the Riksdag since 2018. Lundberg was elected to represent Jönköping County. In parliament she sits on the Committee on Industry and the Social Insurance Committee.
