= Jonas Andersson (politician, born 1972) =

Swedish politician from Skellefteå

Jonas Andersson Member of the Riksdag

Member of the Riksdag
- In office 2018–2022
- Constituency: Västerbotten County

Personal details
- Born: 10 February 1972 (age 54) Skellefteå, Sweden
- Party: Sweden Democrats

Jonas Andersson (born 10 February 1972) is a Swedish politician. He was a member of the Riksdag for the Sweden Democrats party.

Andersson is a youth support worker, in particular working with adopted minors of immigrant backgrounds, and was also a lecturer in leisure studies at a community college in Skellefteå. He was elected as a member of the Riksdag during the 2018 Swedish general election. He is sometimes referred to as Jonas Andersson i Skellefteå to distinguish him from Jonas Andersson i Linghem (born 1989), another member of the Riksdag for the same party.

He stood down in the 2022 Swedish general election.
