= Elin Gustafsson =

Swedish politician (born 1989)

Elin Gustafsson S
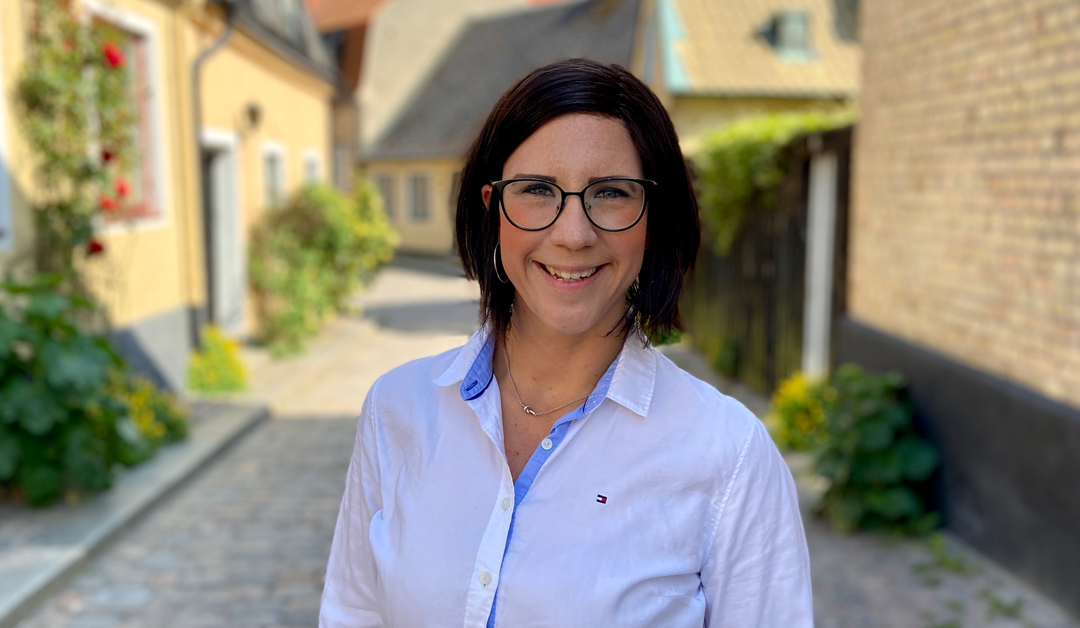

Member of the Swedish Parliament for Skåne County South
- In office 24 September 2018 – 18 October 2022

Personal details
- Born: 1 January 1989 (age 37) Alvesta, Sweden
- Party: Swedish Social Democratic Party
- Profession: Politician

Elin Gustafsson (born 1989) is a Swedish Social Democratic politician who has been a Member of the Riksdag since 2018.
