= Per Schöldberg =

Swedish politician (born 1962)

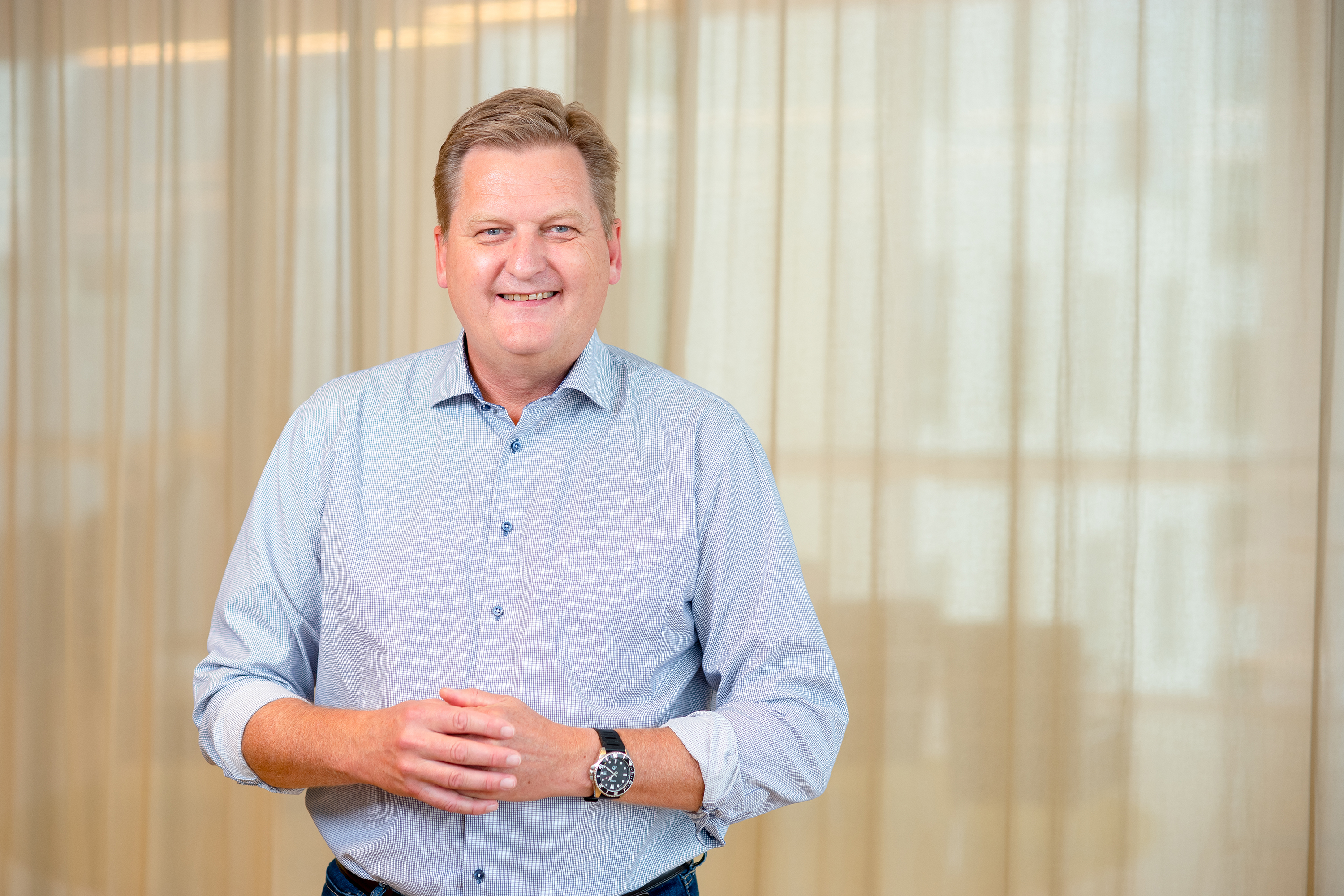
- Per Schöldberg (2019)

Member of the Riksdag
- In office 12 March 2019 – 26 September 2022
- Constituency: Kronoberg County

Personal details
- Born: 1962 (age 63–64)
- Party: Centre Party

Per Schöldberg (born 1962) is a Swedish politician. From March 2019 to September 2022, he served as Member of the Riksdag representing the constituency of Kronoberg County. He became a member after Eskil Erlandsson resigned.
