= Kristina Yngwe =

Swedish politician (born 1983)

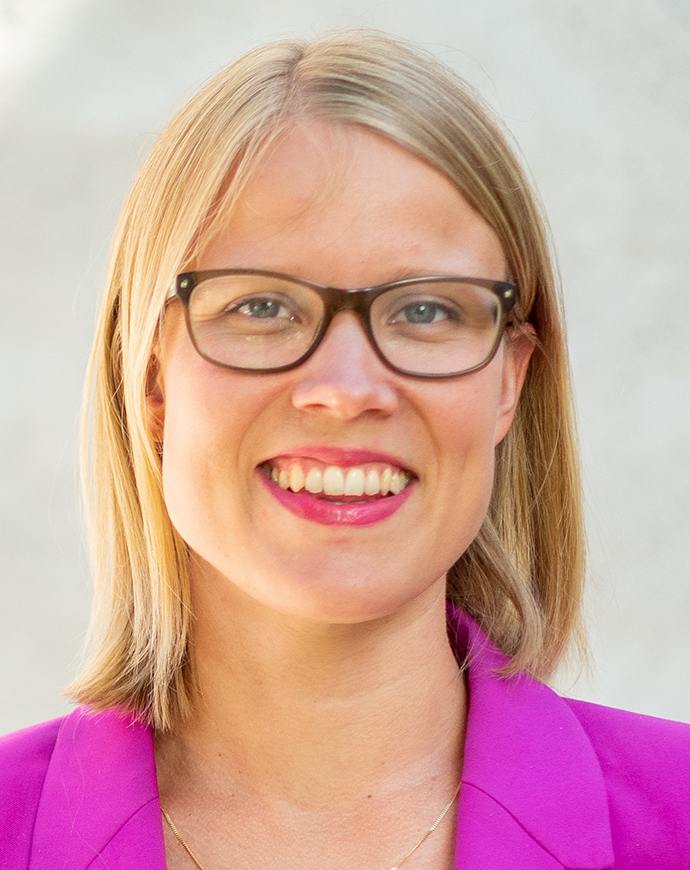

MP for Skåne County Southern
- Incumbent
- Assumed office 2014

Personal details
- Born: 14 July 1983 (age 43)
- Party: Centre Party

Kristina Yngwe (born 14 July 1983) is a Swedish Centre Party politician. She has been a member of the Riksdag since 2014.
