= Johan Hultberg =

Swedish politician (born 1985)

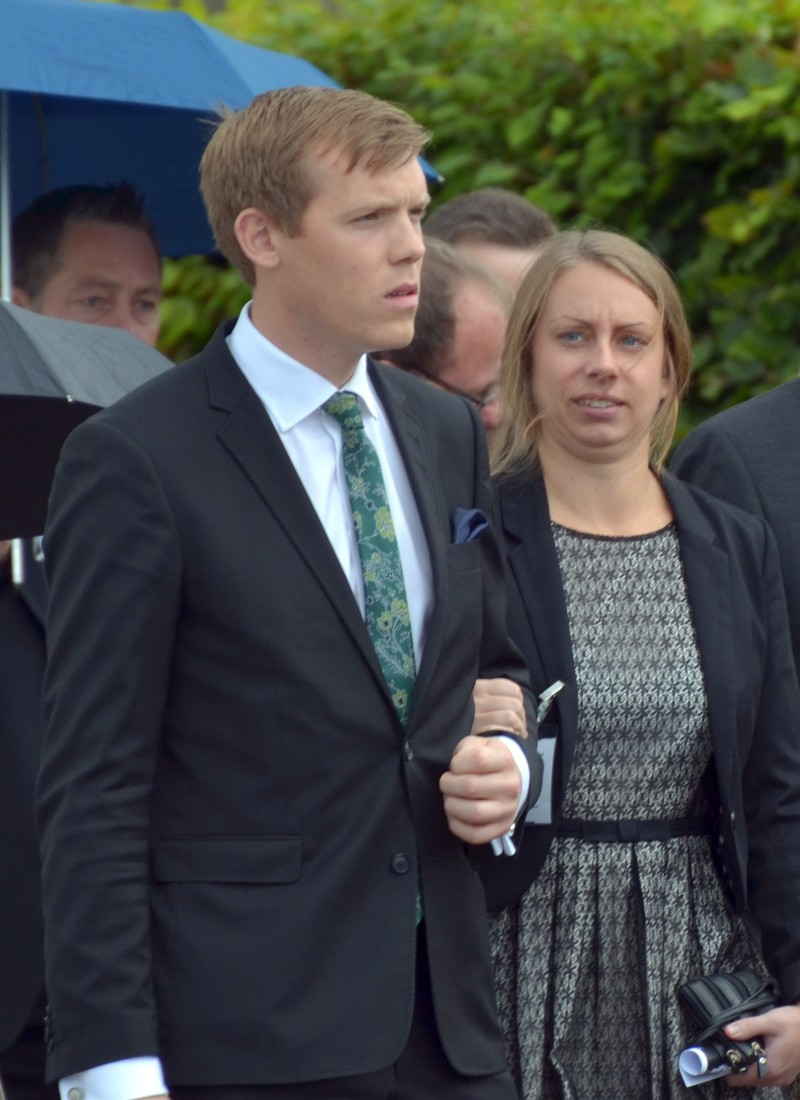

member of the Riksdag
- Incumbent
- Assumed office 2010

Personal details
- Political party: Moderate Party

Johan Hultberg (born 1985) is a Swedish politician of the Moderate Party. He has been a member of the Riksdag since 2010.
