= Anna Vikström =

Swedish politician (born 1957)

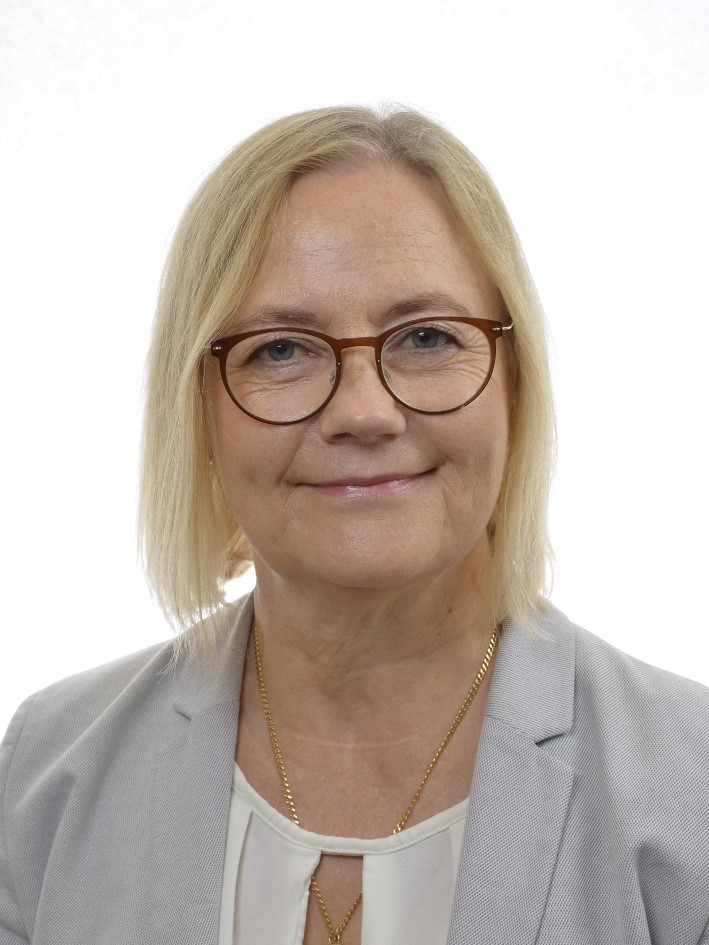
- Born: 1957 (age 68–69)
- Occupation: Politician
- Known for: Member of the Riksdag
- Political party: Social Democratic Party

Anna Vikström (born 1957) is a Swedish Social Democratic Party politician.

Having served as substitute during various periods since 2015, she is a permanent member of the Riksdag from 2020, representing the Stockholm County constituency.

She was also elected as Member of the Riksdag in September 2022.
