= Rickard Nordin =

Swedish politician (born 1983)

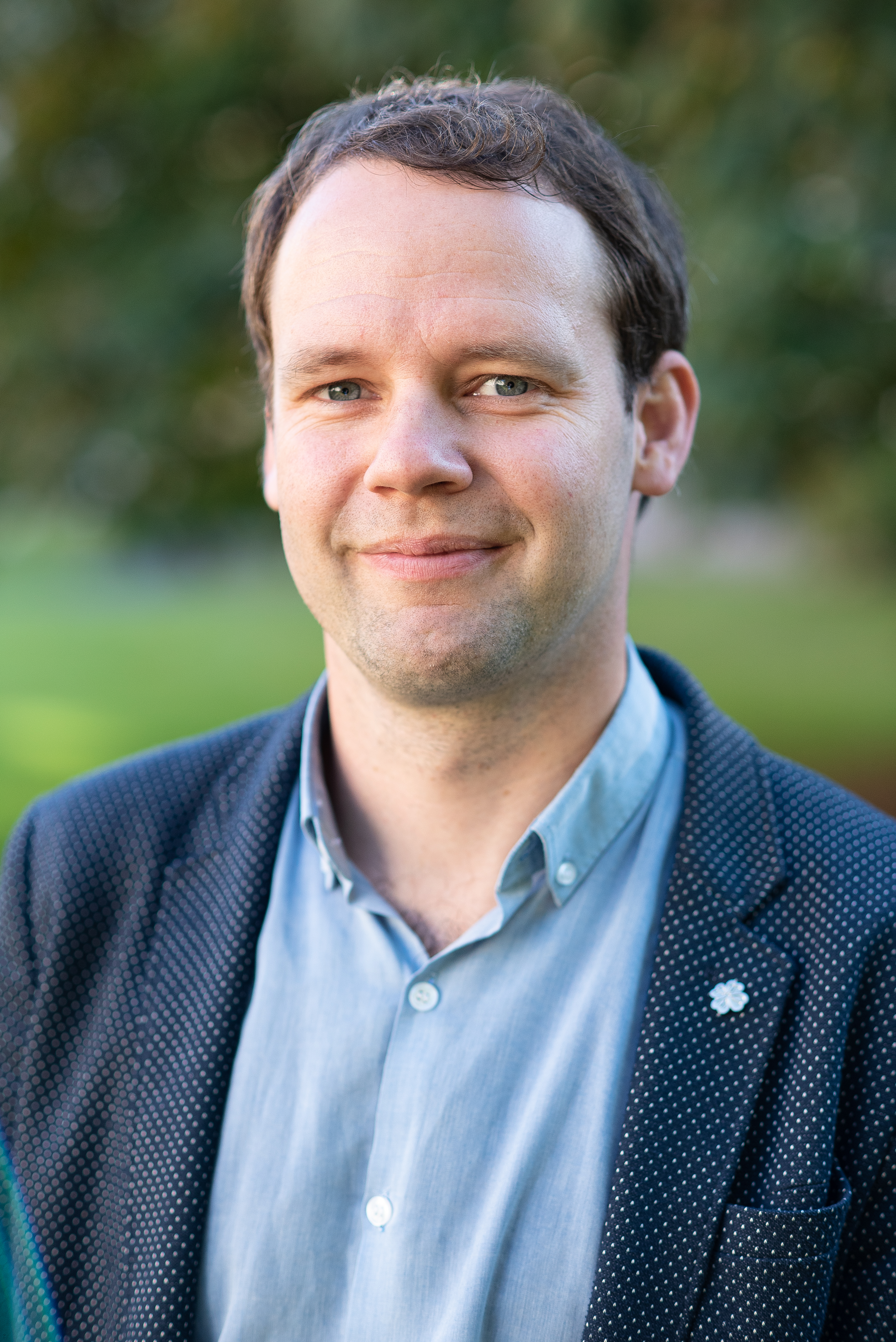
- Nordin in 2020

Member of the Riksdag
- Incumbent
- Assumed office 4 April 2014
- Preceded by: Karin Östring Bergman
- Constituency: Gothenburg Municipality
- In office 21 December 2013 – 2 March 2014
- Preceded by: Karin Östring Bergman
- Succeeded by: Karin Östring Bergman
- Constituency: Gothenburg Municipality
- In office 12 October 2011 – 20 October 2013
- Preceded by: Anders Flanking
- Succeeded by: Karin Östring Bergman
- Constituency: Gothenburg Municipality

Personal details
- Born: 6 May 1983 (age 43)
- Party: Centre Party

Rickard Nordin (born 6 May 1983) is a Swedish politician. He has been a member of the Riksdag since 2014, having previously served from 2011 to 2013 and from 2013 to 2014. He has served as deputy leader of the Centre Party since 2025.
