= Jessica Thunander =

Swedish politician (born 1973)

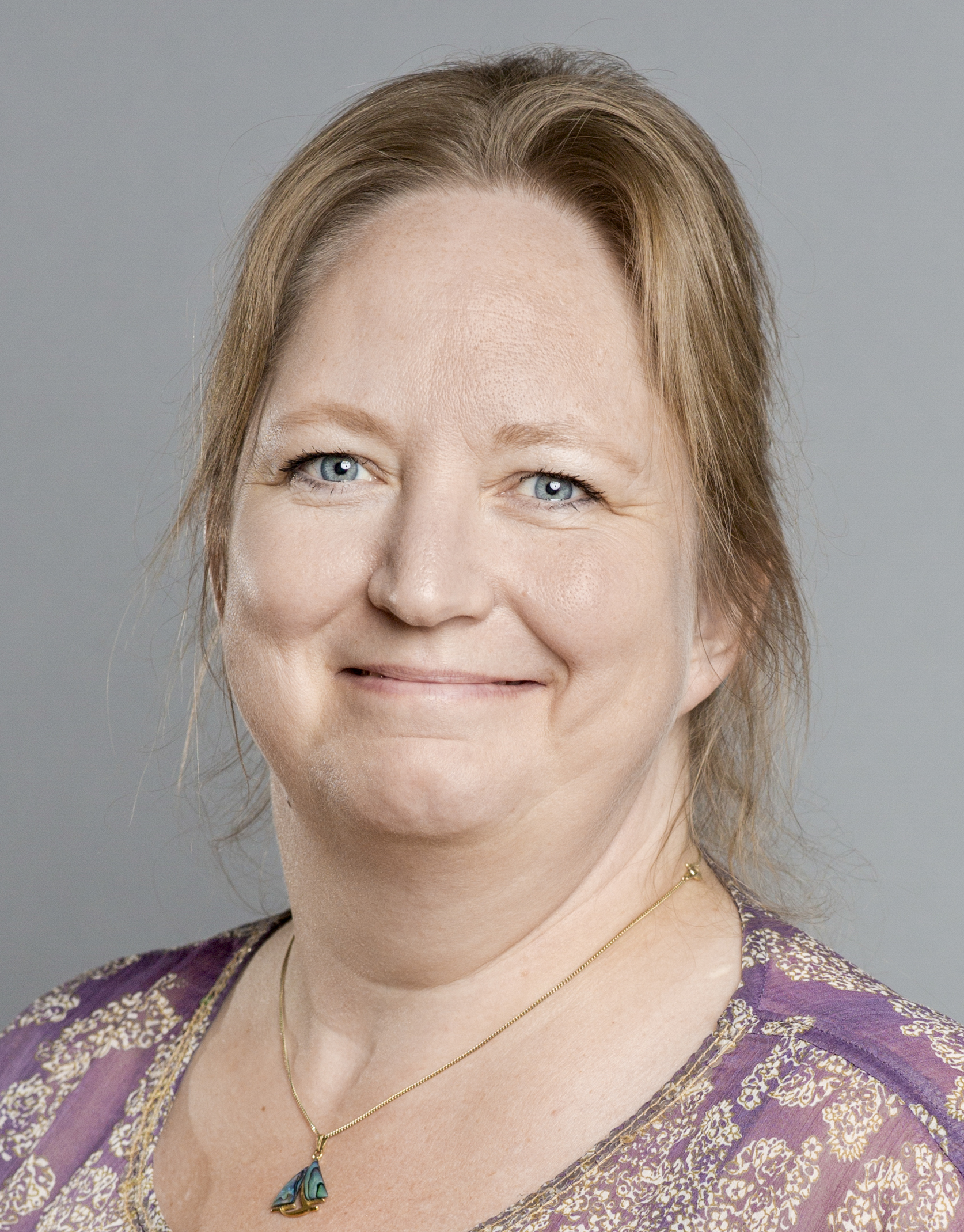
- Thunander in 2018

Member of the Riksdag
- In office 24 September 2018 – 26 September 2022
- Constituency: Västra Götaland County East

Personal details
- Born: 1973 (age 52–53) Gothenburg, Sweden
- Party: Left Party

Jessica Thunander (born 1973 in Gothenburg) is a Swedish politician for the Left Party and a member of the Riksdagen for 2018–2022. There she represents Västra Götaland County East constituency. Thunander grew up and lives in Falköping, before becoming a politician she worked as a teacher in Swedish. She has also worked for the railway SJ.
