= John Weinerhall =

Swedish politician (born 1995)

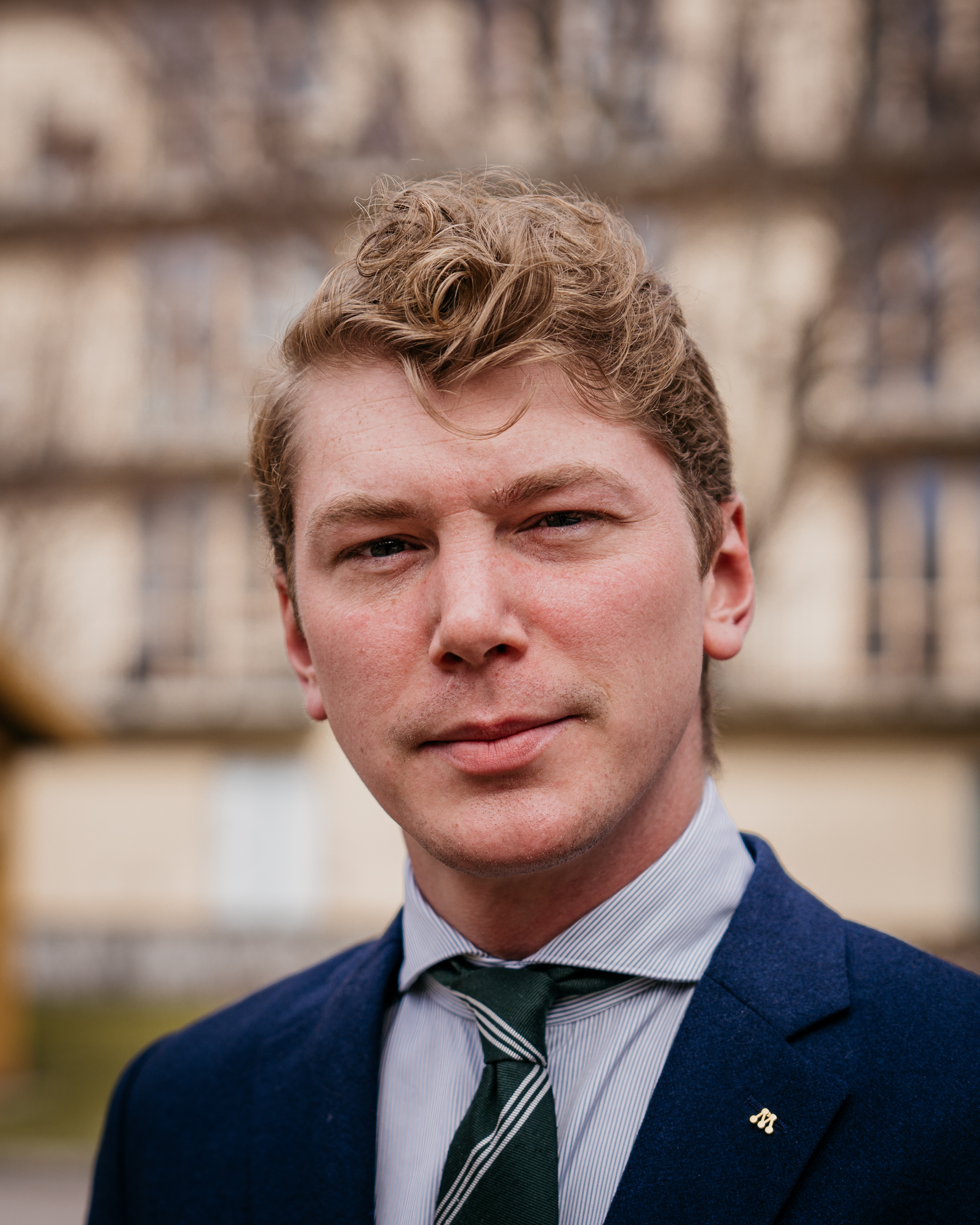
- John Weinerhall's official portrait Picture: Sveriges riksdag

Member of the Riksdag
- Incumbent
- Assumed office 30 September 2018
- Constituency: Östergötland County

Personal details
- Born: 19 April 1995 (age 31) Oxelösund, Sweden
- Party: Moderate Party

John Weinerhall (born 19 April 1995) is a Swedish politician of the Moderate Party. He has been a member of the Riksdag since 2018.

He is the son of the musician and entrepreneur Erik Simons Eriksson. Weinerhall is an Estonian Swede, on his maternal side he descends from the Stavas and Engman families from Odensholm and Rickul/Nuckö. Through this maternal line, he is also related to Lennart Meri, the first president of Estonia after the restoration of independence.

Weinerhall has been a Member of Parliament for the Östergötland County constituency since the 2018 general election. He served as the Moderate Party’s spokesperson on gambling policy from 2018 to 2022. Following the 2022 general election, he was re-elected and, from that year, has been a member of the Committee on Foreign Affairs

He began his political career within the Moderate Youth League and was, among other things, district chairman in Östergötland from 2015 to 2018. He is a member of the regional council in the Östergötland region since the 2014 election, where he worked with health and medical issues.

Beyond his party-political engagement, he has also contributed to public debate; for example, he is co-author of the book Diagnos Sverige: En antologi om framtidens hälsa (Diagnosis Sweden: An Anthology on the Future of Health) alongside researchers, party leaders, opinion leaders, and various other politicians.

Weinerhall served as Second Deputy National Chair of the Moderate Youth League between 2018 and 2020.
