= Rebecka Le Moine =

Swedish politician (born 1990)

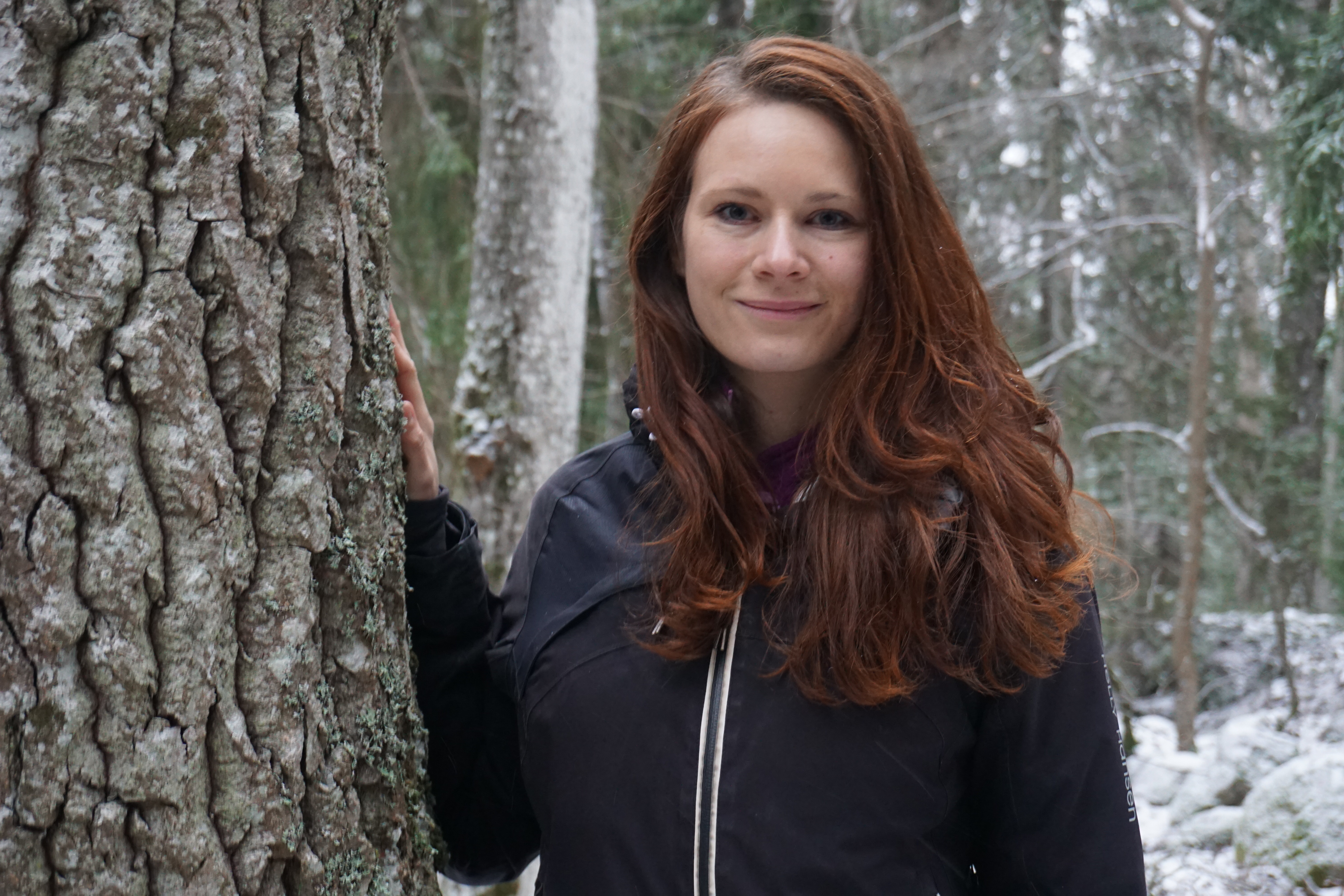

Member of the Riksdag
- Incumbent
- Assumed office 24 September 2018
- Constituency: Östergötland County

Personal details
- Born: 1 August 1990 (age 36)
- Party: Green Party
- Education: Linköping University

Rebecka Le Moine (born 1 August 1990) is a Swedish politician. Since September 2018, she serves as Member of the Riksdag representing the constituency of Östergötland County. She is affiliated with the Green Party.

She was also elected as Member of the Riksdag in September 2022.

She has a bachelor's degree in biology of Linköping University. She also has a master's degree in biology, ecology and nature conservation of the same university.
