= Yasmine Eriksson =

Swedish politician (born 1989)

Member of the Riksdag
- Incumbent
- Assumed office 2018

Personal details
- Born: 1989 (age 36–37) Partille
- Party: Sweden Democrats

Yasmine Eriksson (born 1989) is a Swedish politician and a member of the Sweden Democrats party who has been an MP in the Riksdag since 2018.

== Biography ==
Eriksson was born in Partille. She has summed up her early life as being a "working class kid with a single mother and younger siblings" and of a foreign background. She has claimed that concerns over violent crime in her local area and integration for immigrants were what motivated her to take an interest in politics and join the Sweden Democrats. Eriksson supports stricter assimilation and compulsory language tests for migrants in Sweden, but has also expressed a desire to help to change the public's perception of the Sweden Democrats. Eriksson was the treasurer and secretary of the local SD association in Norrköping and vice chairwoman of the SD's youth wing in the district. She also worked as SD leader Jimmie Akesson's press secretary. Eriksson was elected to the Riksdag at the 2018 Swedish general election. In parliament, she has served on the Committee on the Environment and Agriculture. In 2020, she supported a motion calling for stricter penalties against animal cruelty.
