= Anna Sibinska =

Swedish politician (born 1963)

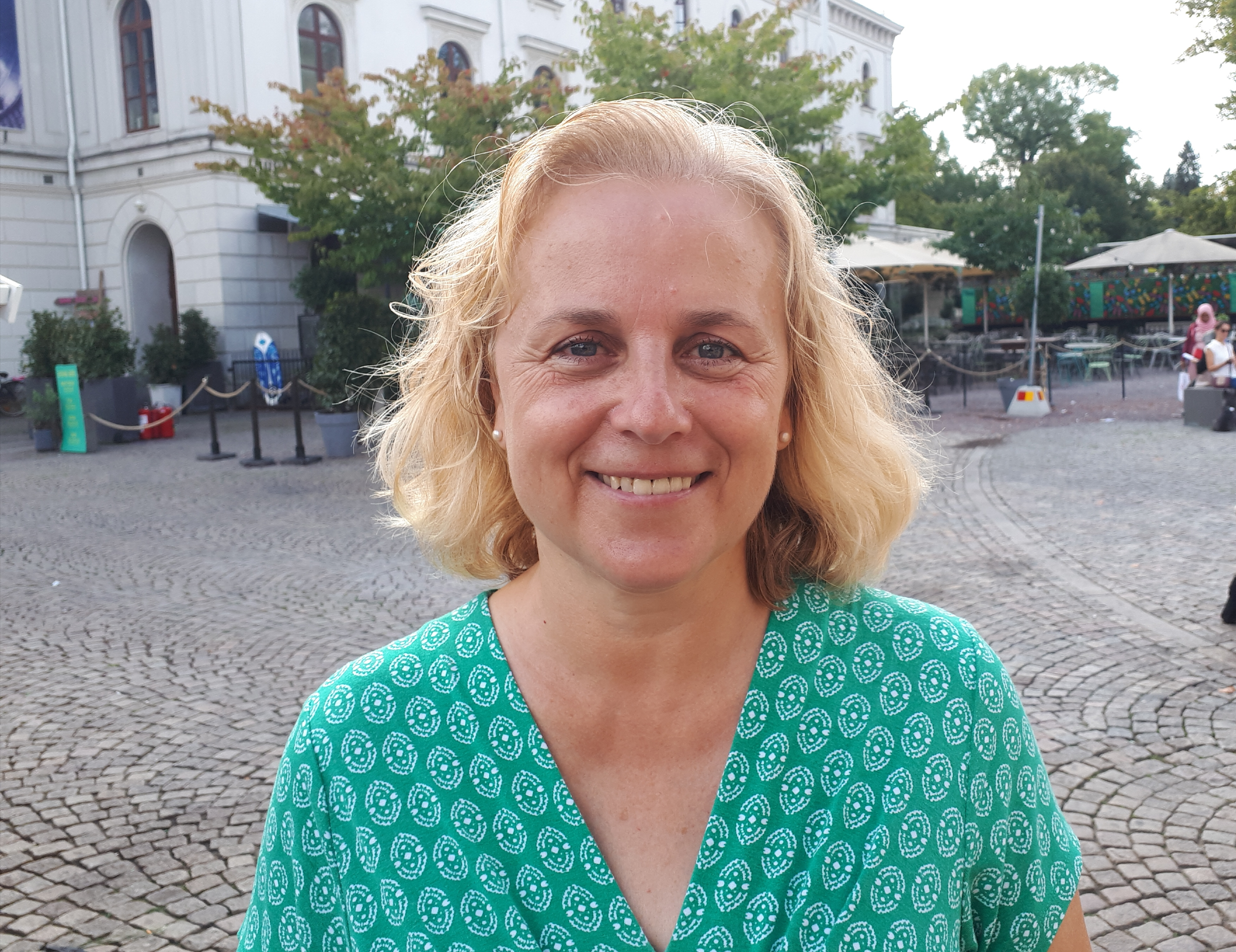
- Sibinska in 2018

Member of the Riksdag
- In office 24 September 2018 – 26 September 2022
- Constituency: Gothenburg Municipality

Personal details
- Born: 1963 (age 62–63)
- Party: Green Party

Anna Sibinska (born 1963) is a Swedish politician. From September 2018 to September 2022, she served as Member of the Riksdag representing the constituency of Gothenburg Municipality.
