= Ann-Christine From Utterstedt =

Swedish politician (born 1972)

Member of the Riksdag
- Incumbent
- Assumed office 2018
- Constituency: Västmanland County

Personal details
- Born: 1972 (age 53–54)
- Party: Sweden Democrats

Ann-Christine From Utterstedt (born 1972) is a Swedish politician for the Sweden Democrats party and has been an MP in the Riksdag since 2018.

From Utterstedt worked as a nursing assistant in a care facility and was a councilor for the Sweden Democrats in Västerås. She was elected to parliament in 2018 representing the Västmanland County constituency and takes seat 165 in the Riksdag. She serves on the Social Affairs Committee and the Committee on the Environment, Public Health and Consumer Policy in the Riksdag. Utterstedt is also the SD's spokesperson on issues concerning the elderly. In this role, she has argued that nursing home staff must be subjected to a Swedish language skills test before being certified to work. In 2020, she was also the party spokesperson on COVID-19 policy.
