= Älghult =

- Location within Kronoberg Location within Sweden
- Coordinates: 57°01′N 15°34′E
- Country: Sweden
- Province: Småland
- County: Kronoberg County
- Municipality: Uppvidinge Municipality

Area
  - Total: 0.94 km^{2} (0.36 sq mi)

Population (31 December 2010)
  - Total: 446
  - Density: 477/km^{2} (1,240/sq mi)
- Time zone: UTC+1 (CET)
  - Summer (DST): UTC+2 (CEST)

Älghult is a locality situated in Uppvidinge Municipality, Kronoberg County, Sweden with 446 inhabitants in 2010.
