= Magnus Stuart =

Swedish politician (born 1952)

Member of the Riksdag
- In office 1 February 2021 – 26 September 2022
- Constituency: Södermanland County

Personal details
- Born: 1952 (age 73–74)
- Party: Moderate

Magnus Stuart (born 1952) is a Swedish politician. From February 2021 to September 2022, he served as Member of the Riksdag representing the constituency of Södermanland County. He became a member after Lotta Finstorp resigned.
