= Jimmy Ståhl =

Swedish politician

Jimmy Rickard Ståhl

Member of the Riksdag
- Incumbent
- Assumed office 2014
- Constituency: Gothenburg Municipality

Personal details
- Born: 27 September 1975 (age 50) Backa, Gothenburg
- Party: Sweden Democrats
- Spouse: Carina Ståhl Herrstedt (2017–present)

Jimmy Rickard Ståhl is a Swedish politician for the Sweden Democrats party. He has been a member of the Riksdag (Sweden's parliament) since 2014 and represents the Gothenburg Municipality constituency.

== Biography ==
Ståhl was born in Gothenburg. He was a dock worker after leaving school and later worked for the Swedish Maritime Administration based at the Port of Gothenburg. He is also an ombudsman for the Swedish dock workers' union. Ståhl has described himself as coming from a Swedish Social Democrats supporting background before joining the Sweden Democrats.

Ståhl was first elected to the Riksdag in 2014 to represent the constituency of Västra Götaland County before switching to represent Gothenburg Municipality after the 2018 general election. In parliament, he sits on the Committee on Industry, Transport Committee and Labor Market Committee. He has focused on opposing increased petrol prices.

He has been married to fellow politician and Sweden Democrats MP Carina Ståhl Herrstedt since 2017.
