= Cassandra Sundin =

Swedish politician (born 1991)

Member of the Riksdag
- Incumbent
- Assumed office 2014

Personal details
- Born: 4 September 1991 (age 35)
- Party: Sweden Democrats
- Education: Uppsala University

Cassandra Helena Margareta Sundin (born 1991), is a Swedish politician who has been a member of the Riksdag since 2014 representing the Sweden Democrats party.

Sundin studied political science, gender studies and sociology at Uppsala University. She was chairwoman of the Sweden Democratic Youth (SDU) in Västernorrland County prior to the SDU's disbanding. She was elected to the Riksdag during the 2014 Swedish general election. She was re-elected at the 2018 general election but retired from the Riksdag at the 2022 Swedish general election to take up a post with the Nordic Council.
