= Sofia Westergren =

Swedish politician (born 1974)

Member of the Riksdag
- In office 24 September 2018 – 26 September 2022
- Constituency: Västra Götaland County West

Personal details
- Born: 1974 (age 51–52)
- Party: Moderate Party

Sofia Westergren (born 1974) is a Swedish politician. From September 2018 to 2022, she served as Member of the Riksdag representing the constituency of Västra Götaland County West.
