= Caroline Nordengrip =

Swedish politician (born 1980)

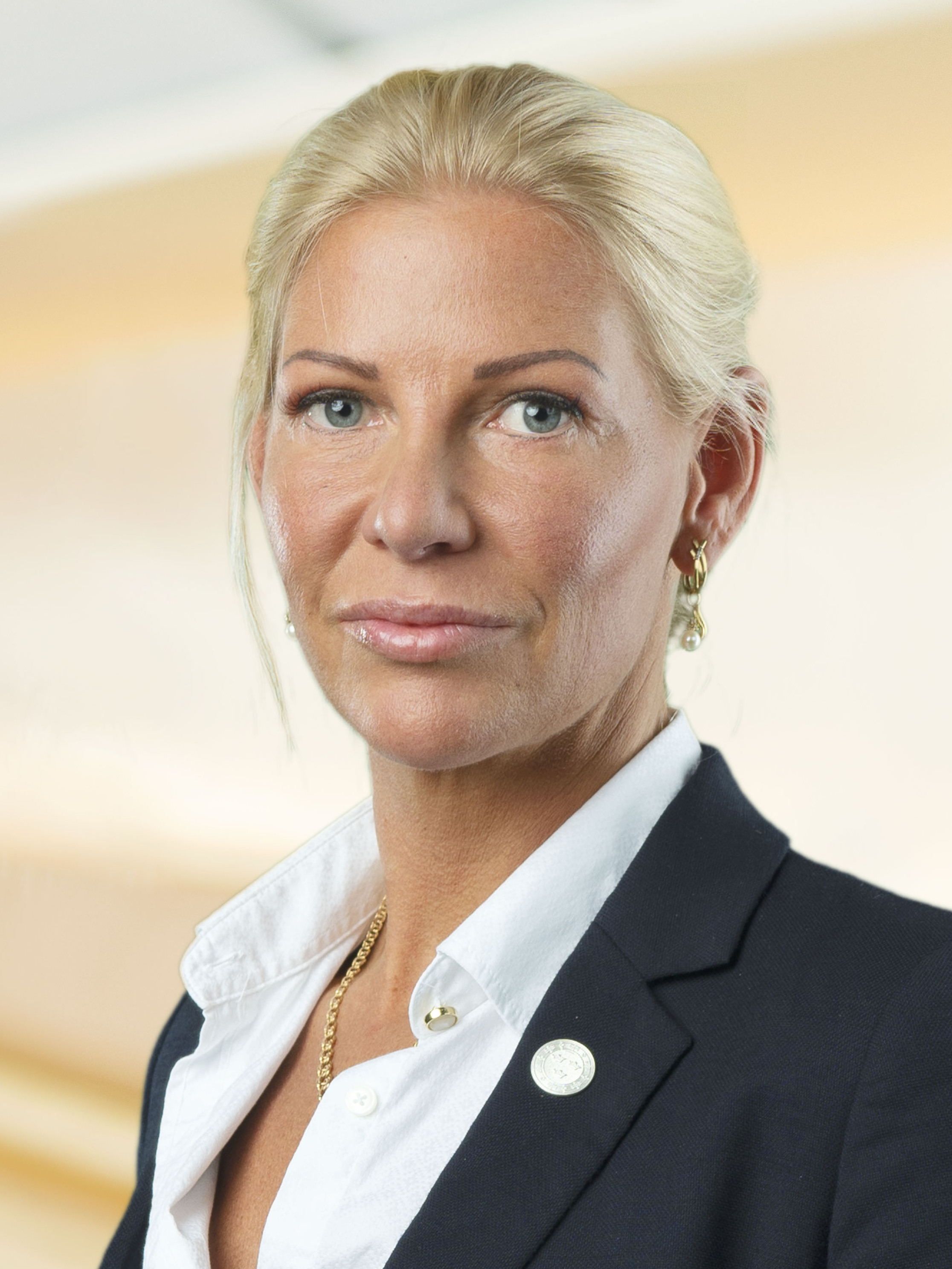

Member of the Riksdag
- In office 2018–2022
- Constituency: Västra Götaland County South

Personal details
- Born: 1980 (age 45–46) Bollebygd, Västra Götaland County, Sweden
- Party: Sweden Democrats
- Military career
- Allegiance: Ukraine
- Branch: Ukrainian Ground Forces: 47th Mechanized Brigade
- Service years: 2023–present
- Rank: Sergeant
- Conflicts: Russo-Ukrainian War; Russian invasion of Ukraine

Caroline Nordengrip (born 1980) is a Swedish politician and former member of the Riksdag from 2018 to 2022 for the Sweden Democrats. She represents the constituency of Västra Götaland County. In 2023, she joined the Armed Forces of Ukraine as a soldier following the Russian invasion of Ukraine.

== Biography ==
=== Politics ===
Nordengrip is a native of Bollebygd. She served in the Swedish Army after leaving school before working as a lorry driver. She has sat on the local council for the SD in Bollebygd and has also served as the party's national ombudsman. She has cited concerns about security, transport and the countryside as her main reasons for getting involved in politics. While in parliament, Nordengrip called for harsher penalties against convicted child molesters, including chemical castration.

=== Ukraine ===
In April 2023, responding to the Russian invasion of Ukraine, Nordengrip announced she would not seek another term in the Riksdag for the 2022 election and enlisted in the Armed Forces of Ukraine's 47th Mechanized Brigade. She had visited Ukraine during her political career. She first announced the decision on her Instagram page and stated that she was motivated to do so after listening to a speech from the Ukrainian ambassador to Sweden and hearing reports of the Bucha massacre. She also elaborated "It is easy to get peace if you give up, but you will then lose freedom. Without freedom, we have no democracy." Her decision was supported by the Sweden Democrats and MPs from other parties.
