= Elisabeth Falkhaven =

Swedish politician (born 1955)

Member of the Riksdag
- Incumbent
- Assumed office 24 September 2018
- Constituency: Halland County

Personal details
- Born: 1955 (age 70–71)
- Party: Green Party

Elisabeth Falkhaven (born 12 September 1955) is a Swedish politician from the Green Party. She has been a Member of the Riksdag from Halland County since 2018 to 2022.

On 23 June 2021 she undertook godparenthood for Aliaksandr Kardziukou, the witness of the killing of Hienadz Shutau and a Belarusian political prisoner.

== See also ==
- List of members of the Riksdag, 2018–2022
