= Betty Malmberg =

Swedish politician

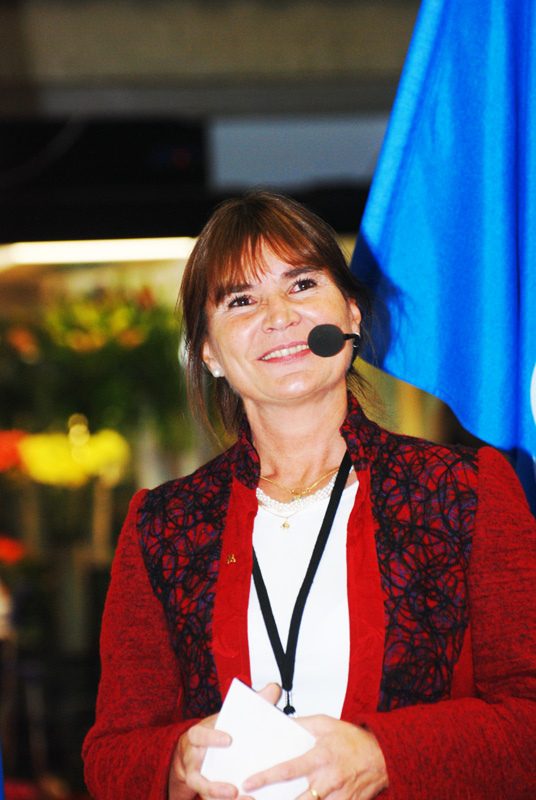
- Betty Malmberg in October 2012

Member of the Swedish Parliament for Östergötland County
- In office 2 October 2006 – 26 September 2022

Personal details
- Born: 3 May 1958 (age 67) Spånga, Stockholm, Sweden
- Party: Moderate Party
- Profession: Agronomist, politician

Karin Betty Kristina Malmberg (née Schotte; born 3 May 1958 in Spånga, Stockholm) is a Swedish agronomist and politician from Ödeshög in Östergötland County. She was member of the Riksdag from 2006 to 2022.

Betty Malmberg was elected during the 2006 general election, and sat as a regular member from 2006 to 2010. From 2010 to 2013, she was a deputy in the Riksdag, and in 2013 became a regular member again.
