= Lars Thomsson =

Politician and Member of the parliament of Sweden

Lars Thomsson C
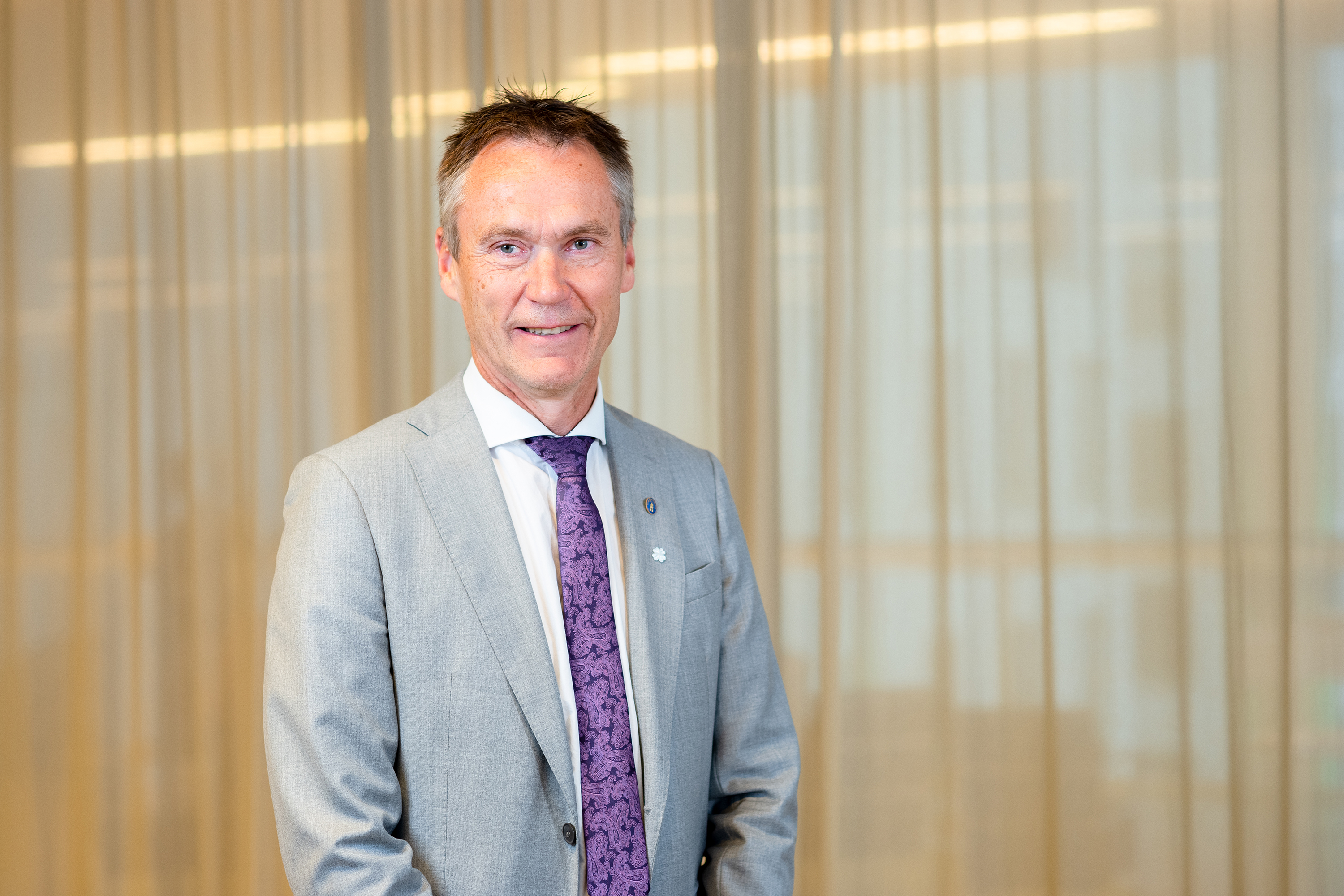

Member of the Swedish Parliament for Gotland County
- Incumbent
- Assumed office 9 September 2018

Personal details
- Born: 24 April 1964 (age 61)
- Party: Center Party
- Parents: Thomas Thomsson; Elsa Thomsson (née Josefsson Knutas)
- Profession: Politician, company owner
- Website: centerpartiet.se

Lars Thomsson (born 1964) is a Swedish politician and member of the Riksdag for the Centre Party. He joined the Riksdag after the 2018 general elections, he is currently taking up seat number 14 in the Riksdag for the constituency of Gotland County. He is a member of the Swedish delegation to the OSCE, and he serves as an alternate in the Riksdag for the Committee on Finance, Committee on Defence, and the Committee on Justice.

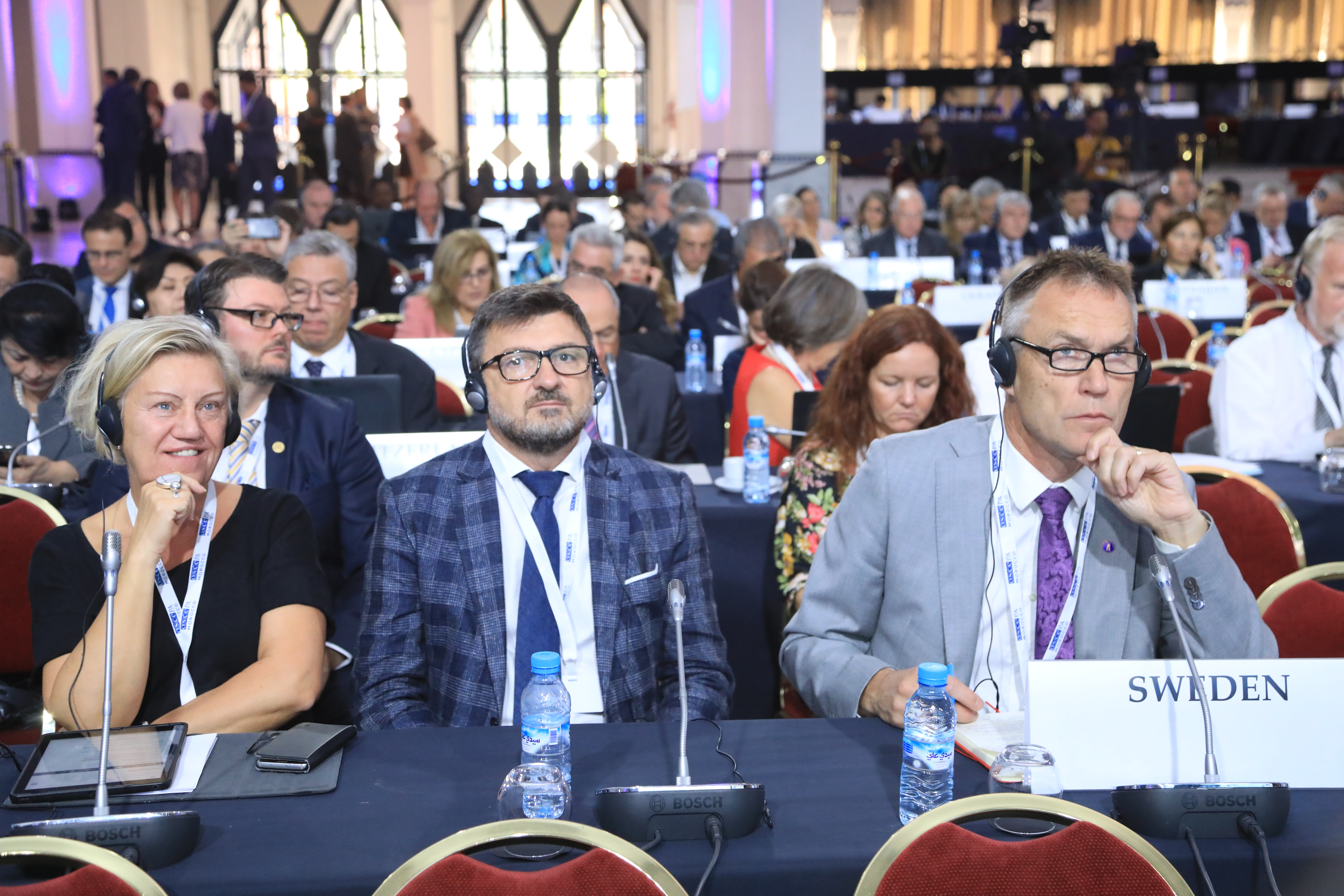
(left) Carina Ödebrink (center) Jasenko Omanović (right) Lars Thomsson at the OSCE Autumn Meeting in October 2019.
