= Jörgen Grubb =

Swedish politician (born 1962)

Member of the Riksdag
- Incumbent
- Assumed office 24 September 2018
- Constituency: Östergötland County

Personal details
- Born: 1962 (age 63–64)
- Party: Sweden Democrats

Jörgen Grubb (born 1962) is a Swedish politician. Since September 2018, he serves as Member of the Riksdag representing the constituency of Östergötland County.

Grubb worked as a project manager for various business ventures before becoming a political organizer for the SD in Malmö. He previously served as the regional chairman for the SD in Malmö. In the Riksdag he is the member of the Finance Committee, the Justice Committee, the Constitution Committee, the Tax Committee, the Traffic Committee and the Education Committee.
