= Per Ramhorn =

Swedish politician (born 1967)

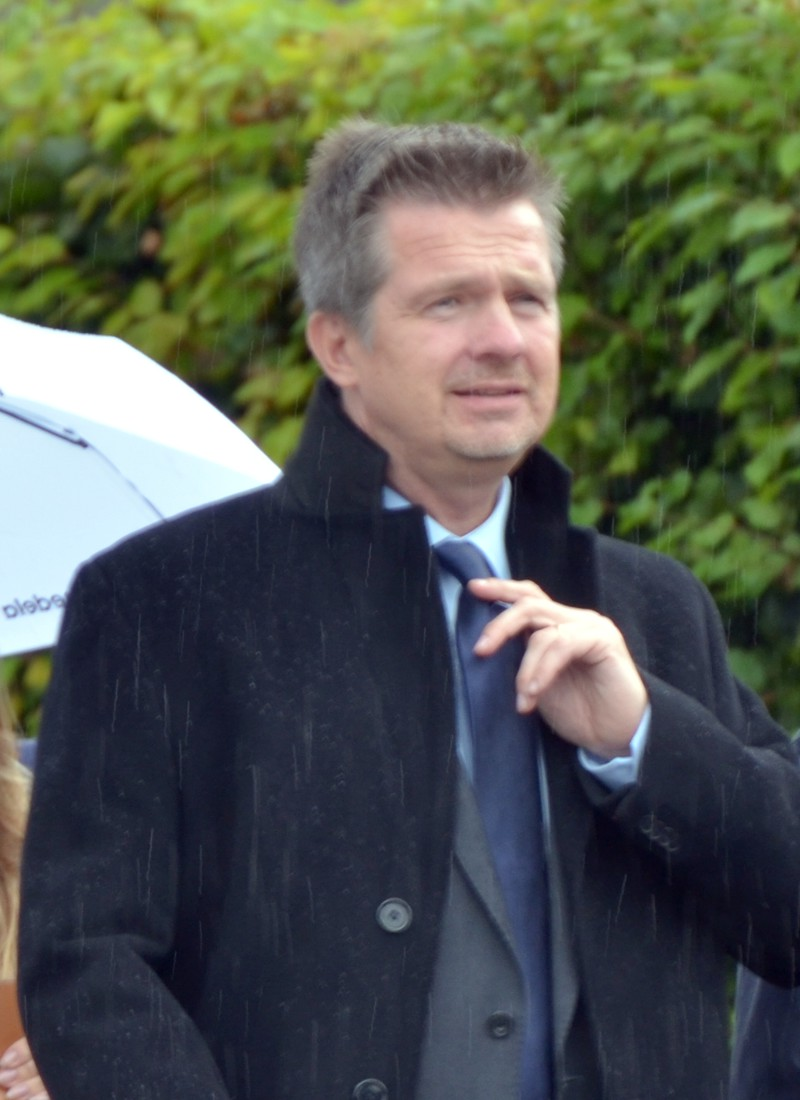

member of the Riksdag
- In office 2010–2022

Personal details
- Born: 3 November 1967 (age 58) Fosie
- Political party: Sweden Democrats

Per Håkan Ramhorn (born 3 November 1967 in Fosie) is a Swedish politician for the Sweden Democrats, and a member of the Riksdag from 2010 to 2022.
