= Linda Modig =

Swedish politician

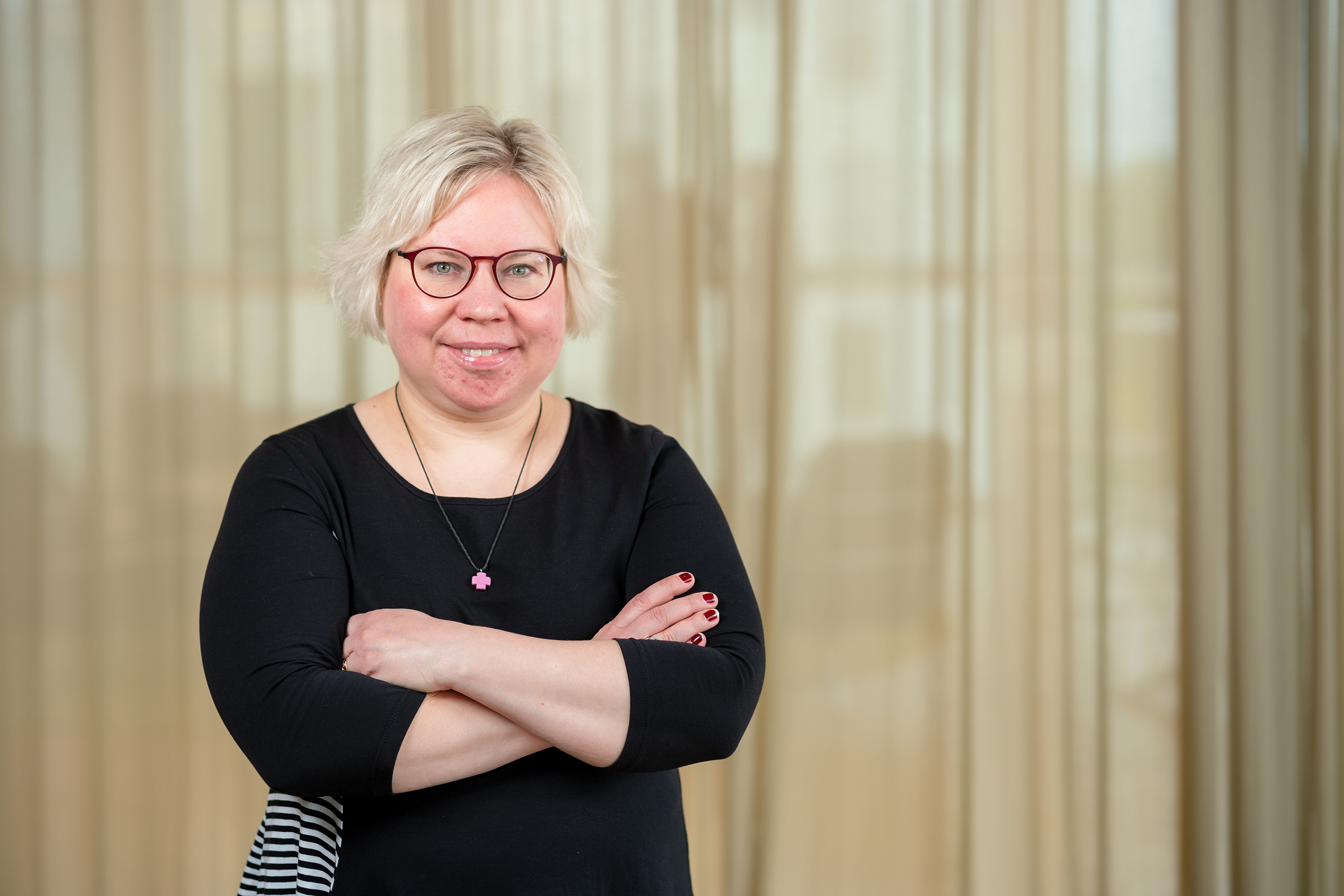
- Born: Linda Ylivainio; 1975 (age 50–51)
- Occupation: Politician

Linda Modig, née Ylivainio, (born 1975) is a Swedish Centre Party politician. In the 2018 parliamentary election, she was elected Member of Parliament for Norrbotten County constituency.

Modig has been involved in the Center Party since 1988. In 2008, she became Övertorneå's first female municipal councillor. Modig has worked as a political expert for Maud Olofsson and as chief of staff for the Centre Party leader Annie Lööf. In 2013, she took a break from her political assignments to study to become a priest, but in 2017, she returned to politics and was elected to the Center Party Party Board.

Modig lives in Övre Kuivakangas in Övertorneå and is a trained jurist.

Party political offices
| Preceded by Anders W. Jonsson | First Deputy Leader of the Centre Party; 2021–2023 | Succeeded by Daniel Bäckström |
