= Pernilla Stålhammar =

Swedish politician (born 1971)

Member of the Riksdag
- In office 15 July 2017 – 24 September 2018
- Preceded by: Åsa Romson
- Constituency: Stockholm Municipality

Personal details
- Born: Eva Karin Pernilla Johansson; 1971 (age 54–55)
- Party: Green Party

Eva Karin Pernilla Stålhammar (née Johansson; born 1971) is a Swedish politician and former member of the Riksdag, the national legislature. A member of the Green Party, she represented Stockholm Municipality between July 2017 and September 2018. She had been a substitute member of the Riksdag three times: October 2014 to June 2016 (for Åsa Romson); June 2016 and July 2017 (for Per Bolund); and January 2019 to November 2021 (for Per Bolund).

Stålhammar is the daughter of psychologist Stefan Johansson and the museum curator Barbara Johansson. She was educated at Linköping. She has a master's degree in economics from Växjö University. She also studied economics at the University of Dundee, French at the University of Nice Sophia Antipolis and journalism at Stockholm University's Journalisthögskolan i Stockholm (JMK).

Stålhammar was a national economist at the Swedish International Development Cooperation Agency (Sida) (1994–1995) and in charge of Sida's development work with Palestine and involvement in the Middle East peace process (1995–1998). She was a Swedish representative at the African Development Bank in Abidjan, Ivory Coast (1999–2001). She worked for the Ministry for Foreign Affairs (2001–2003) and for the International Task Force on Global Public Goods (2003–2005). She was Sida's Ethiopia country co-ordinator (2007–2009).
