= Kjell Jansson =

Swedish politician (born 1959)

Member of the Riksdag
- Incumbent
- Assumed office 2018
- Constituency: Stockholm County

Personal details
- Born: 3 December 1959 (age 66) Stockholm County, Sweden
- Party: Moderate Party

Kjell Gösta Jansson (born 3 December 1959) is a Swedish politician from the Moderate Party who was elected a member of parliament for Stockholm County in 2018 and 2022. He has been a municipal councillor in Norrtälje Municipality.

== See also ==
- List of members of the Riksdag, 2018–2022
- List of members of the Riksdag, 2022–2026
