= Mikael Strandman =

Swedish politician (born 1966)

Member of the Riksdag
- Incumbent
- Assumed office 2018
- Constituency: Stockholm County

Personal details
- Born: 1966 (age 59–60) Danderyd
- Party: Sweden Democrats
- Education: KTH Royal Institute of Technology

Mikael Strandman (born 1966) is a Swedish politician who is a member of the Riksdag representing the Sweden Democrats.

Strandman graduated from the KTH Royal Institute of Technology with a Master's degree in engineering and worked as a civil engineer. He was elected to the Riksdag in 2018, representing Stockholm County and takes seat 246 in parliament. Strandman is also the local chairman of the Sweden Democrats in Norrtälje.

== See also ==
- Politics of Sweden
- List of political parties in Sweden
