= Jonas Andersson (politician, born 1989) =

Swedish politician

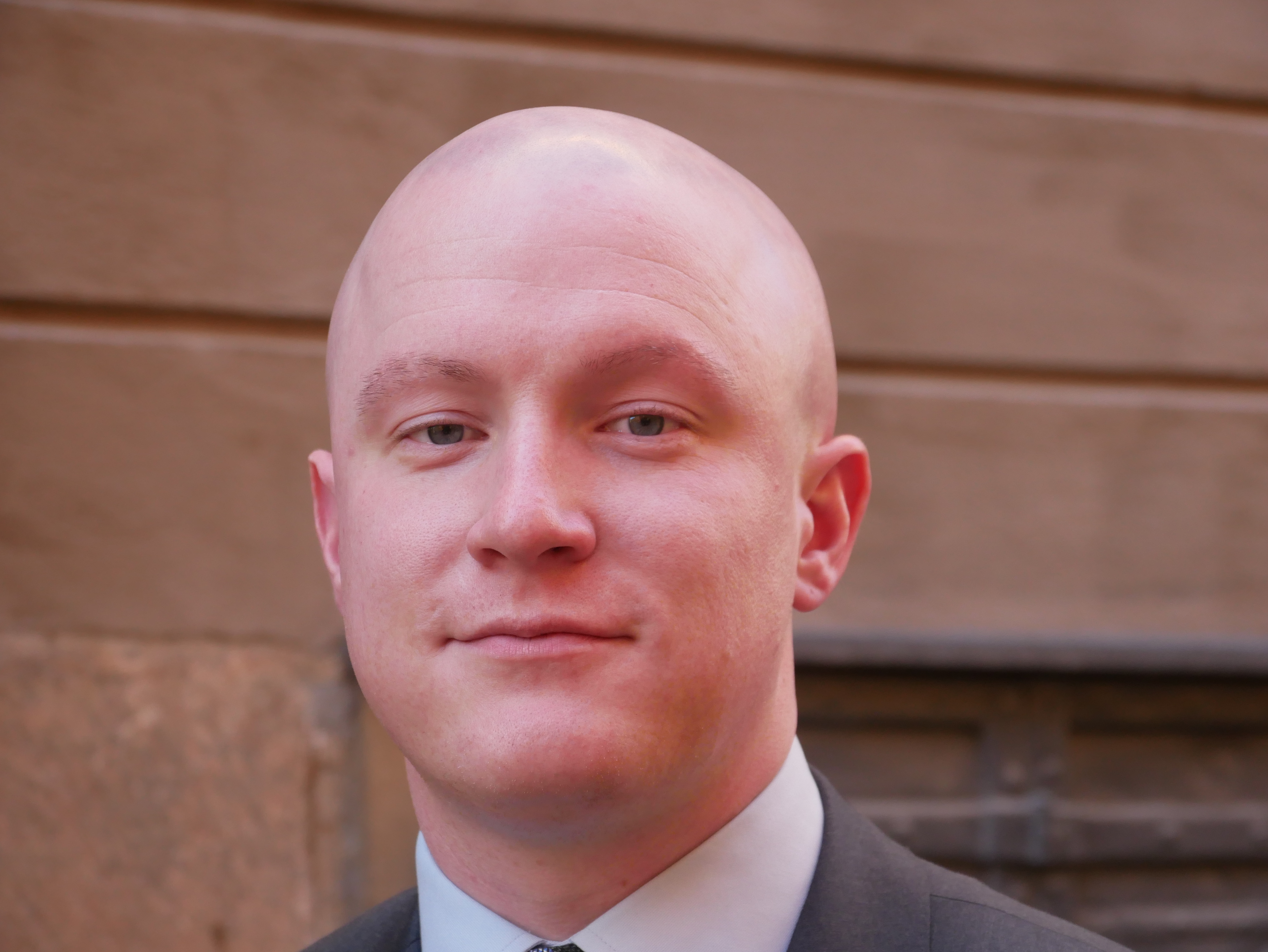

Member of the Riksdag
- Incumbent
- Assumed office 2018
- Constituency: Östergötland County

Personal details
- Born: 4 October 1989 (age 36) Eskilstuna, Sweden
- Party: Sweden Democrats
- Education: Linköping University

Jonas Peter Andersson (born 4 October 1989) is a Swedish politician. He has been a member of the Riksdag for the Sweden Democrats since 2018.

He is referred to as Jonas Andersson i Linghem or Jonas Andersson i Linköping to distinguish him from Jonas Andersson i Skellefteå (born 1972), another member of the Riksdag.

Andersson was born in Eskilstuna and holds a PhD in political science from Linköping University. He is chairman of the Sweden Democrats in Linköping and has been a member of Linköping City Council since 2010 and a member of the regional council in the Östergötland region. In the 2018 Swedish general election, Andersson was elected to the Swedish Parliament. In October 2018, Expressen revealed that Andersson had expressed controversial comments that were deemed racist on the Swedish blogsite Politically Incorrect in 2010. The SD's leadership held talks with Andersson, who expressed regret and publicly apologized.
