= Lars Andersson (politician) =

Swedish politician (born 1964)

Member of the Riksdag
- Incumbent
- Assumed office 2018
- Constituency: Skåne Southern

Personal details
- Born: 1964 (age 61–62) Södertälje
- Party: Sweden Democrats
- Education: Oklahoma State University

Lars Andersson (born 1964) is a Swedish politician and MP in the Riksdag for the Sweden Democrats party.

Andersson graduated with a degree in business administration from Oklahoma State University in 1984. He then lived and worked in the United States for an export company before returning to Sweden in 2009 to work for an IT firm. Andersson was elected to the Riksdag in 2018 for the Skåne County constituency and takes seat 154 in parliament. He serves on the Committee on Industry and Finance Committee.
