= Maria Gardfjell =

Swedish politician (born 1965)

Member of the Riksdag
- Incumbent
- Assumed office 24 September 2018
- Constituency: Uppsala County

Personal details
- Born: 1965 (age 60–61)
- Party: Green Party

Maria Gardfjell (born 1965) is a Swedish politician. From 2018 to 2022 she served as Member of the Riksdag representing the constituency of Uppsala County.

She is a biologist and geoscientist.
