= Elin Segerlind =

Swedish politician (born 1985)

Member of the Riksdag
- In office 24 September 2018 – 26 September 2022
- Constituency: Västra Götaland County North

Personal details
- Born: Elin Maria Segerlind; 1985 (age 40–41)
- Party: Left Party
- Education: Umeå University

Elin Maria Segerlind (born 1985) is a Swedish politician and former member of the Riksdag, the national legislature. A member of the Left Party, she represented Västra Götaland County North between September 2018 and September 2022.

Segerlind is the daughter of shop worker Dennis Segerlind and nurse Carina Segerlind. She was educated in Nödinge and studied literature and cultural studies at Umeå University. She studied journalism at a folk high school in Vara. She was a reported for Sveriges Radio between 2011 and 2013.
