= Staffan Eklöf =

Swedish politician (born 1965)

Staffan Eklöf Dr

Member of the Riksdag
- Incumbent
- Assumed office 2018
- Constituency: Jönköping County

Personal details
- Born: 1965 (age 60–61) Uppsala
- Party: Sweden Democrats
- Education: Umeå University

Staffan Eklöf (born 1965 in Vaksala, Uppsala County) is a Swedish politician and member of the Riksdag for the Sweden Democrats.

Eklöf graduated with a PhD in cell and molecular biology from Umeå University and worked at the Swedish Board of Agriculture (SBA). He was elected to the Riksdag in 2018, taking seat 96 for the Halland County constituency. In parliament, he has been a member of the Environment and Agriculture Committee since 2021. He is also a municipal councilor for the Sweden Democrats in Jönköping. He has been a member of the Nordic Council since 2020.
