= Johan Löfstrand =

Swedish politician (born 1976)

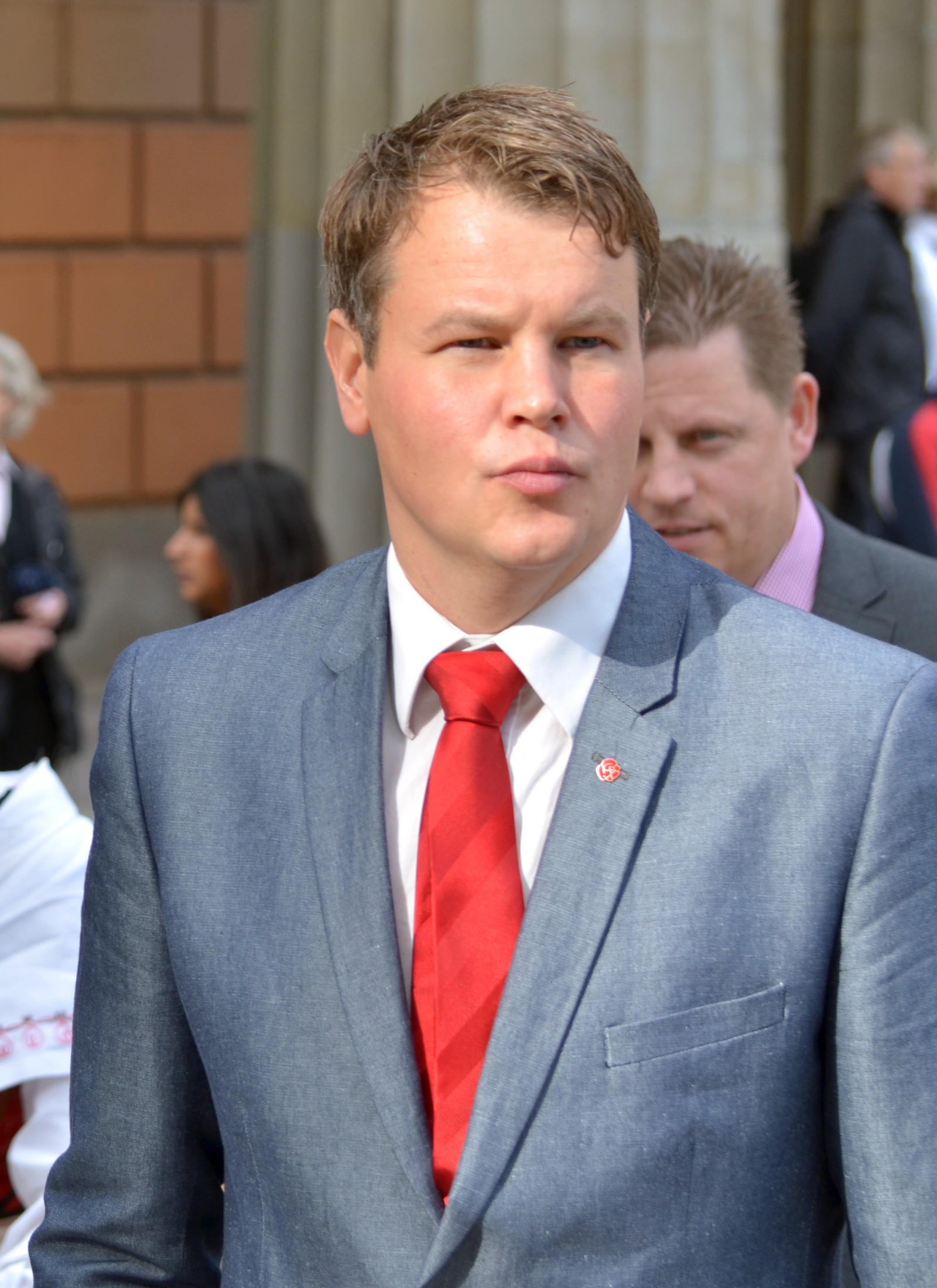
Johan Löfstrand.

Johan Löfstrand (born 3 August 1976) is a Swedish social democratic politician who has been a member of the Riksdag since 2002.
