= Alexander Christiansson =

Swedish politician (born 1981)

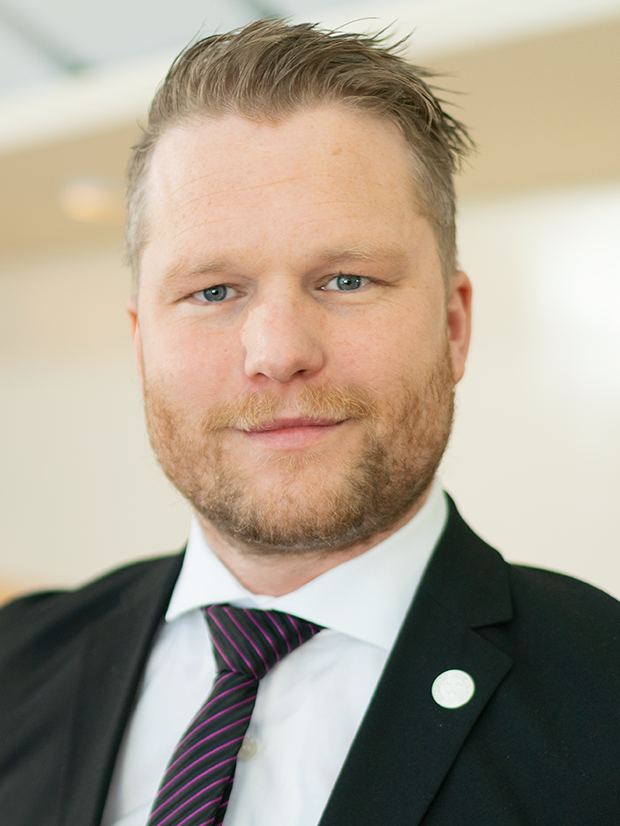

Member of the Riksdag
- Incumbent
- Assumed office 2018
- Constituency: Gothenburg Municipality

Personal details
- Born: 1981 (age 44–45) Lerum
- Party: Sweden Democrats

Alexander Christiansson (born 1981) is a Swedish politician and member of the Riksdag for the Sweden Democrats party.

Christiansson is the son of musician Ulf Christiansson who founded the Swedish rock band Jerusalem.

He worked as an accounts manager for Scandinavian Airlines and Eniro before founding a business called Aspit Sverige AB. He was the Sweden Democrats candidate for the diocese of Gothenburg during the 2017 Swedish church elections. Following the 2018 Swedish general election, Christiansson was elected to the Gothenburg Municipality constituency and takes seat 263 in the Riksdag. He serves on the EU Committee in parliament and is a Swedish delegation member to the Council of Europe.

In 2018, Christiansson proposed a motion in the Riksdag to move the Swedish embassy in Israel from Tel Aviv to Jerusalem.
