= Sofia Nilsson (politician) =

Swedish politician (born 1982)

Sofia Nilsson S
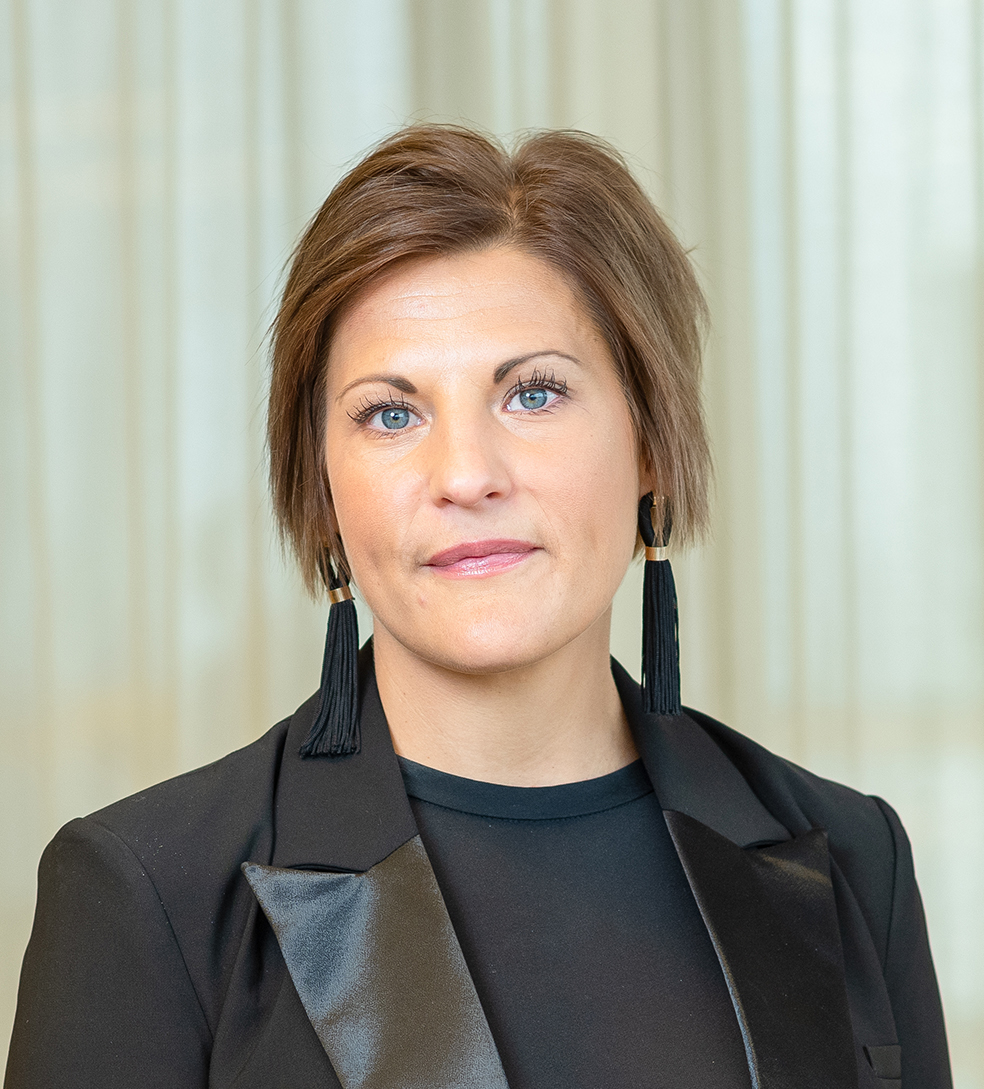

Member of the Swedish Parliament for Skåne Northern and Eastern
- In office 2018–2022

Personal details
- Born: 3 March 1982 (age 44)
- Party: Centre Party
- Profession: Politician

Ingrid Sofia Nilsson (born 3 March 1982) is a Swedish Centre Party politician who has been a Member of the Riksdag for Skåne County North and East since 2018.
