= Charlotte Quensel =

Swedish politician (born 1961)

Member of the Riksdag
- Incumbent
- Assumed office 2018
- Constituency: Västra Götaland County

Personal details
- Born: 23 October 1961 (age 64) Stockholm
- Party: Sweden Democrats

Anna Charlotte Quensel (born 1961) is a Swedish economist and politician of the Sweden Democrats party and a member of the Riksdag since 2018.

== Biography ==
Quensel was born in 1961 in Stockholm. She is the granddaughter of Swedish lawyer and politician Nils Quensel. She has been a member of the Riksdag since 2018, and takes seat 303 for the constituency of Västra Götaland County. She sits on the Finance and EU Committees.

In her role on the Finance Committee, Quensel has played a role in calling for changes in the laws over public sector procurement in response to reports of Swedish governments agencies working with companies blacklisted by the World Bank.
