= Jon Thorbjörnson =

Swedish politician (born 1976)

Member of the Riksdag
- In office 24 September 2018 – 26 September 2022
- Constituency: Halland County

Personal details
- Born: Jon Andreas Thorbjörnson; 1976 (age 49–50)
- Party: Left Party

Jon Andreas Thorbjörnson (born 1976) is a Swedish politician, teacher and former member of the Riksdag, the national legislature. A member of the Left Party, he represented Halland County between September 2018 and September 2022.

Thorbjörnson is the son of carpet installer Hans Olof Thorbjörnson and dentist Christina Thorbjörnson (née Bohlin). He has a teaching degree and was a teacher in Kungsbacka Municipality from 2003 to 2018. He was a member of the municipal council in Kungsbacka Municipality from 2014 to 2018.
