= Anne Oskarsson =

Swedish politician (born 1946)

Member of the Riksdag
- Incumbent
- Assumed office 2018
- Constituency: Kalmar County

Personal details
- Born: 1946 (age 79–80)
- Party: Sweden Democrats
- Education: Faculty of Engineering (LTH), Lund University
- Occupation: Civil Engineering

Anne Oskarsson (born 1946) is a Swedish politician for the Sweden Democrats party and a member of the Riksdag since 2018.

Oskarsson graduated with a Master's degree in scientific engineering and worked as a civil engineer, making her one of five Sweden Democrats MPs to come from an engineering background to be elected to parliament in 2018. Oskarsson is a municipal councilor in Borgholm and serves as the SD group leader in Borgholm. She currently represents the constituency of Kalmar County and takes seat 60 in the Riksdag.
