= Christina Östberg =

Swedish politician (born 1968)

Member of the Riksdag
- Incumbent
- Assumed office 2014
- Constituency: Kalmar County

Personal details
- Born: 10 May 1968 (age 57) Edefors, Sweden
- Party: Sweden Democrats

Christina Elisabeth Östberg (born 10 May 1968) is a Swedish politician and a member of the Riksdag for the Sweden Democrats party. She was first elected in 2014 and has served on the Social Affairs Committee and Education Committee in parliament. In parliament, Östberg has called for tougher laws against substance and drug abuse.
