= List of members of the Riksdag, 2018–2022 =

This is a list of members of the Riksdag, elected in the 2018 Swedish general election, for the term 2018–2022.

== List of MPs ==
Incumbent MPs, including alternates for serving ministers (listed in cursive) and their current party affiliations, as of 5 February 2022:

Seat	Member of Parliament	Party	Constituency
1	Åsa Lindestam	Social Democrats	Gävleborg County
2	Lotta Johnsson Fornarve	Left	Södermanland County
3	Kerstin Lundgren	Centre	Stockholm County
4	Lars Jilmstad	Moderate	Stockholm Municipality
5	Elsemarie Bjellqvist	Social Democrats	Stockholm Municipality
6	Barbro Westerholm	Liberals	Stockholm County
7	Karin Enström	Moderate	Stockholm County
8	Mikael Oscarsson	Christian Democrats	Uppsala County
9	Johan Löfstrand	Social Democrats	Östergötland County
10	Betty Malmberg	Moderate	Östergötland County
11	Anders Åkesson	Centre	Kalmar County
12	Jan R. Andersson	Moderate	Kalmar County
13	Hanna Westerén	Social Democrats	Gotland County
14	Lars Thomsson	Centre	Gotland County
15	Elin Gustafsson	Social Democrats	Skåne County South
16	Anders Hansson	Moderate	Skåne County South
17	Hans Hoff	Social Democrats	Halland County
18	Jennie Nilsson	Social Democrats	Halland County
19	Ann-Christin Ahlberg	Social Democrats	Västra Götaland County South
20	Jan Ericson	Moderate	Västra Götaland County South
21	Lars Mejern Larsson	Social Democrats	Värmland County
22	Gunilla Svantorp	Social Democrats	Värmland County
23	Pia Nilsson	Social Democrats	Västmanland County
24	Mattias Vepsä	Social Democrats	Stockholm Municipality
25	Margareta Cederfelt	Moderate	Stockholm Municipality
26	Markus Selin	Social Democrats	Stockholm County
27	Amanda Palmstierna	Green	Stockholm County
28	Jan Björklund	Liberals	Stockholm County
29	Per Lodenius	Centre	Stockholm County
30	Solveig Zander	Centre	Uppsala County
31	John Widegren	Moderate	Östergötland County
32	Johan Andersson	Social Democrats	Östergötland County
33	Björn Petersson	Social Democrats	Kalmar County
34	Mattias Bäckström Johansson	Sweden Democrats	Kalmar County
35	Laila Naraghi	Social Democrats	Kalmar County
36	Annicka Engblom	Moderate	Blekinge County
37	Richard Jomshof	Sweden Democrats	Blekinge County
38	Boriana Åberg	Moderate	Skåne County South
39	Ola Johansson	Centre	Halland County
40	Adnan Dibrani	Social Democrats	Halland County
41	Bengt Eliasson	Liberals	Halland County
42	Cecilie Tenfjord-Toftby	Moderate	Västra Götaland County South
43	Petter Löberg	Social Democrats	Västra Götaland County South
44	Patrik Jönsson	Sweden Democrats	Västra Götaland County South
45	Patrick Reslow	Sweden Democrats	Värmland County
46	Daniel Bäckström	Centre	Värmland County
47	Olle Thorell	Social Democrats	Västmanland County
48	Per Åsling	Centre	Jämtland County
49	Saila Quicklund	Moderate	Jämtland County
50	Ulf Kristersson	Moderate	Stockholm Municipality
51	Fredrik Malm	Liberals	Stockholm Municipality
52	Abraham Halef	Social Democrats	Stockholm County
53	Fredrik Schulte	Moderate	Stockholm County
54	Amineh Kakabaveh	Independent	Stockholm County
55	Ingela Nylund Watz	Social Democrats	Stockholm County
56	Pyry Niemi	Social Democrats	Uppsala County
57	Jessika Roswall	Moderate	Uppsala County
58	Markus Wiechel	Sweden Democrats	Östergötland County
59	Magnus Oscarsson	Christian Democrats	Östergötland County
60	Anne Oskarsson	Sweden Democrats	Kalmar County
61	Tomas Kronståhl	Social Democrats	Kalmar County
62	Magnus Manhammar	Social Democrats	Blekinge County
63	Angelika Bengtsson	Sweden Democrats	Blekinge County
64	Rikard Larsson	Social Democrats	Skåne County South
65	Jennie Åfeldt	Sweden Democrats	Skåne County South
66	Helena Storckenfeldt	Moderate	Halland County
67	Larry Söder	Christian Democrats	Halland County
68	Lars Püss	Moderate	Halland County
69	Elisabeth Falkhaven	Green	Halland County
70	Ingemar Kihlström	Christian Democrats	Västra Götaland County South
71	Caroline Nordengrip	Sweden Democrats	Västra Götaland County South
72	Runar Filper	Sweden Democrats	Värmland County
73	Mikael Dahlqvist	Social Democrats	Värmland County
74	Mikael Damsgaard	Moderate	Västmanland County
75	Roger Haddad	Liberals	Västmanland County
76	Jasenko Omanovic	Social Democrats	Västernorrland County
77	Kristina Nilsson	Social Democrats	Västernorrland County
78	Anders Frimert	Social Democrats	Jämtland County
79	Kalle Olsson	Social Democrats	Jämtland County
80	Per Bolund	Green	Stockholm Municipality
81	Johan Forssell	Moderate	Stockholm Municipality
82	Robert Halef	Christian Democrats	Stockholm County
83	Julia Kronlid	Sweden Democrats	Stockholm County
84	Hanif Bali	Moderate	Stockholm County
85	Jakob Forssmed	Christian Democrats	Stockholm County
86	Marta Obminska	Moderate	Uppsala County
87	Gustaf Lantz	Social Democrats	Uppsala County
88	Mattias Ottosson	Social Democrats	Östergötland County
89	Linda Westerlund Snecker	Left	Östergötland County
90	Per Schöldberg	Centre	Kronoberg County
91	Gudrun Björnegård	Christian Democrats	Kalmar County
92	Hillevi Larsson	Social Democrats	Malmö Municipality
93	Heléne Björklund	Social Democrats	Blekinge County
94	Sofia Damm	Christian Democrats	Skåne County South
95	Mats Persson	Liberals	Skåne County South
96	Staffan Eklöf	Sweden Democrats	Halland County
97	Ulrika Jörgensen	Moderate	Halland County
98	Gunilla Carlsson	Social Democrats	Gothenburg Municipality
99	Hans Rothenberg	Moderate	Gothenburg Municipality
100	Jörgen Hellman	Social Democrats	Västra Götaland County North
101	Mikael Larsson	Centre	Västra Götaland County South
102	Håkan Svenneling	Left	Värmland County
103	Pål Jonson	Moderate	Värmland County
104	Åsa Coenraads	Moderate	Västmanland County
105	Oscar Sjöstedt	Sweden Democrats	Västmanland County
106	Christina Höj Larsen	Left	Västernorrland County
107	Johnny Skalin	Sweden Democrats	Västernorrland County
108	Cassandra Sundin	Sweden Democrats	Jämtland County
109	Helén Pettersson	Social Democrats	Västerbotten County
110	Jens Holm	Left	Stockholm Municipality
111	Christian Carlsson	Christian Democrats	Stockholm Municipality
112	Maria Arnholm	Liberals	Stockholm County
113	Maria Stockhaus	Moderate	Stockholm County
114	Azadeh Rojhan Hedin	Social Democrats	Stockholm County
115	Leif Nysmed	Social Democrats	Stockholm County
116	Paula Bieler	Sweden Democrats	Uppsala County
117	Sanne Lennström	Social Democrats	Uppsala County
118	Teresa Carvalho	Social Democrats	Östergötland County
119	Eva Lindh	Social Democrats	Östergötland County
120	ClasGöran Carlsson	Social Democrats	Kronoberg County
121	Katarina Brännström	Moderate	Kronoberg County
122	Allan Widman	Liberals	Malmö Municipality
123	Tobias Billström	Moderate	Malmö Municipality
124	Kristina Yngwe	Centre	Skåne County South
125	Marianne Pettersson	Social Democrats	Skåne County South
126	Eric Westroth	Sweden Democrats	Halland County
127	Jon Thorbjörnson	Left	Halland County
128	Lars Hjälmered	Moderate	Gothenburg Municipality
129	Mattias Jonsson	Social Democrats	Gothenburg Municipality
130	Johan Hultberg	Moderate	Västra Götaland County North
131	Magnus Jacobsson	Christian Democrats	Västra Götaland County North
132	Marléne Lund Kopparklint	Moderate	Värmland County
133	Kjell-Arne Ottosson	Christian Democrats	Värmland County
134	Åsa Eriksson	Social Democrats	Västmanland County
135	Vasiliki Tsouplaki	Left	Västmanland County
136	Emil Källström	Centre	Västernorrland County
137	Anna-Belle Strömberg	Social Democrats	Västernorrland County
138	Jonas Sjöstedt	Left	Västerbotten County
139	Isak From	Social Democrats	Västerbotten County
140	Maria Ferm	Green	Stockholm Municipality
141	Jessica Rosencrantz	Moderate	Stockholm Municipality
142	Magdalena Schröder	Moderate	Stockholm County
143	Åsa Westlund	Social Democrats	Stockholm County
144	Niklas Wykman	Moderate	Stockholm County
145	Martin Kinnunen	Sweden Democrats	Stockholm County
146	Ilona Szatmari Waldau	Left	Uppsala County
147	Maria Gardfjell	Green	Uppsala County
148	Jörgen Grubb	Sweden Democrats	Östergötland County
149	Juno Blom	Liberals	Östergötland County
150	Sven-Olof Sällström	Sweden Democrats	Kronoberg County
151	Mattias Karlsson in Norrhult	Sweden Democrats	Kronoberg County
152	Per Ramhorn	Sweden Democrats	Malmö Municipality
153	Johanna Öfverbeck	Green	Malmö Municipality
154	Lars Andersson	Sweden Democrats	Skåne County South
155	Hanna Gunnarsson	Left	Skåne County South
156	Tuve Skånberg	Christian Democrats	Skåne County North and East
157	Rickard Nordin	Centre	Gothenburg Municipality
158	Anna Johansson	Social Democrats	Gothenburg Municipality
159	Maj Karlsson	Left	Gothenburg Municipality
160	Paula Holmqvist	Social Democrats	Västra Götaland County North
161	Jimmy Ståhl	Sweden Democrats	Västra Götaland County North
162	Arman Teimouri	Liberals	Värmland County
163	Johan Pehrson	Liberals	Örebro County
164	Eva-Lena Jansson	Social Democrats	Örebro County
165	Ann-Christine From Utterstedt	Sweden Democrats	Västmanland County
166	Jörgen Berglund	Moderate	Västernorrland County
167	Malin Larsson	Social Democrats	Västernorrland County
168	Helena Lindahl	Centre	Västerbotten County
169	Edward Riedl	Moderate	Västerbotten County
170	Teres Lindberg	Social Democrats	Stockholm Municipality
171	Ali Esbati	Left	Stockholm Municipality
172	Johan Hedin	Centre	Stockholm Municipality
173	Karin Rågsjö	Left	Stockholm Municipality
174	Solange Olame Bayibsa	Social Democrats	Stockholm County
175	Ida Drougge	Moderate	Stockholm County
176	Robert Stenkvist	Sweden Democrats	Stockholm County
177	Serkan Köse	Social Democrats	Stockholm County
178	Marlene Burwick	Social Democrats	Uppsala County
179	Lina Nordquist	Liberals	Uppsala County
180	Jonas Andersson i Linghem	Sweden Democrats	Östergötland County
181	Margareta Fransson	Green	Östergötland County
182	Monica Haider	Social Democrats	Kronoberg County
183	Helena Bouveng	Moderate	Jönköping County
184	Jamal El-Haj	Social Democrats	Malmö Municipality
185	Momodou Malcolm Jallow	Left	Malmö Municipality
186	Axel Hallberg	Green	Skåne County South
187	Clara Aranda	Sweden Democrats	Skåne County South
188	Christer Nylander	Liberals	Skåne County North and East
189	Hans Wallmark	Moderate	Skåne County North and East
190	Johan Büser	Social Democrats	Gothenburg Municipality
191	Robert Hannah	Liberals	Gothenburg Municipality
192	Dennis Dioukarev	Sweden Democrats	Gothenburg Municipality
193	Yasmine Posio	Left	Gothenburg Municipality
194	Fredrik Christensson	Centre	Västra Götaland County North
195	Mats Wiking	Social Democrats	Västra Götaland County North
196	Carina Ohlsson	Social Democrats	Västra Götaland County East
197	Cecilia Widegren	Moderate	Västra Götaland County East
198	Elisabeth Svantesson	Moderate	Örebro County
199	Mia Sydow Mölleby	Left	Örebro County
200	Sofie Eriksson	Social Democrats	Dalarna County
201	Carl-Oskar Bohlin	Moderate	Dalarna County
202	Elisabeth Björnsdotter Rahm	Moderate	Västerbotten County
203	Björn Wiechel	Social Democrats	Västerbotten County
204	Jonas Andersson i Skellefteå	Sweden Democrats	Västerbotten County
205	Åsa Karlsson	Social Democrats	Västerbotten County
206	Johanna Jönsson	Centre	Stockholm Municipality
207	Nooshi Dadgostar	Left	Stockholm Municipality
208	Lawen Redar	Social Democrats	Stockholm Municipality
209	Anders Österberg	Social Democrats	Stockholm Municipality
210	Mathias Tegnér	Social Democrats	Stockholm County
211	Erik Ottoson	Moderate	Stockholm County
212	Alexandra Anstrell	Moderate	Stockholm County
213	Kjell Jansson	Moderate	Stockholm County
214	Michael Rubbestad	Sweden Democrats	Uppsala County
215	Sofia Amloh	Social Democrats	Södermanland County
216	Magnus Ek	Centre	Östergötland County
217	John Weinerhall	Moderate	Östergötland County
218	Annie Lööf	Centre	Jönköping County
219	Jakob Olofsgård	Liberals	Jönköping County
220	Joakim Sandell	Social Democrats	Malmö Municipality
221	Niels Paarup-Petersen	Centre	Malmö Municipality
222	Louise Meijer	Moderate	Skåne County South
223	Ann-Charlotte Hammar Johnsson	Moderate	Skåne County West
224	Annelie Karlsson	Social Democrats	Skåne County North and East
225	Björn Söder	Sweden Democrats	Skåne County North and East
226	Anna Sibinska	Green	Gothenburg Municipality
227	Marie-Louise Hänel Sandström	Moderate	Gothenburg Municipality
228	Annika Qarlsson	Centre	Västra Götaland County West
229	Ann-Sofie Alm	Moderate	Västra Götaland County North
230	Matheus Enholm	Sweden Democrats	Västra Götaland County North
231	Elin Segerlind	Left	Västra Götaland County North
232	Patrik Björck	Social Democrats	Västra Götaland County East
233	Ulrika Heie	Centre	Västra Götaland County East
234	Jonas Eriksson	Green	Örebro County
235	David Lång	Sweden Democrats	Örebro County
236	Ann-Britt Åsebol	Moderate	Dalarna County
237	Maria Strömkvist	Social Democrats	Dalarna County
238	Ulla Andersson	Left	Gävleborg County
239	Anders W. Jonsson	Centre	Gävleborg County
240	Fredrik Lundh Sammeli	Social Democrats	Norrbotten County
241	Linus Sköld	Social Democrats	Norrbotten County
242	Gulan Avci	Liberals	Stockholm County
243	Dag Larsson	Social Democrats	Stockholm Municipality
244	Kristina Axén Olin	Moderate	Stockholm Municipality
245	Lorentz Tovatt	Green	Stockholm Municipality
246	Mikael Strandman	Sweden Democrats	Stockholm County
247	Bo Broman	Sweden Democrats	Stockholm County
248	Anna Vikström	Social Democrats	Stockholm County
249	Annika Hirvonen	Green	Stockholm County
250	Caroline Helmersson Olsson	Social Democrats	Södermanland County
251	Hans Ekström	Social Democrats	Södermanland County
252	Peter Persson	Social Democrats	Jönköping County
253	Jimmie Åkesson	Sweden Democrats	Jönköping County
254	Andreas Carlson	Christian Democrats	Jönköping County
255	Mats Green	Moderate	Jönköping County
256	Stefan Plath	Sweden Democrats	Malmö Municipality
257	Noria Manouchi	Moderate	Malmö Municipality
258	Carina Ståhl Herrstedt	Sweden Democrats	Skåne County West
259	Tina Acketoft	Liberals	Skåne County West
260	Per-Arne Håkansson	Social Democrats	Skåne County North and East
261	Christina Östberg	Sweden Democrats	Skåne County North and East
262	Maria Nilsson	Liberals	Gothenburg Municipality
263	Alexander Christiansson	Sweden Democrats	Gothenburg Municipality
264	Kenneth G. Forslund	Social Democrats	Västra Götaland County West
265	Roland Utbult	Christian Democrats	Västra Götaland County West
266	Ellen Juntti	Moderate	Västra Götaland County West
267	Camilla Waltersson Grönvall	Moderate	Västra Götaland County West
268	Sten Bergheden	Moderate	Västra Götaland County East
269	Josef Fransson	Sweden Democrats	Västra Götaland County East
270	Lotta Olsson	Moderate	Örebro County
271	Per Söderlund	Sweden Democrats	Örebro County
272	Magnus Persson	Sweden Democrats	Dalarna County
273	Daniel Riazat	Left	Dalarna County
274	Elin Lundgren	Social Democrats	Gävleborg County
275	Lars Beckman	Moderate	Gävleborg County
276	Birger Lahti	Left	Norrbotten County
277	Emilia Töyrä	Social Democrats	Norrbotten County
278	Martin Ådahl	Centre	Stockholm Municipality
279	Katja Nyberg	Sweden Democrats	Stockholm Municipality
280	Kadir Kasirga	Social Democrats	Stockholm Municipality
281	Alexander Ojanne	Social Democrats	Stockholm Municipality
282	Lorena Delgado Varas	Left	Stockholm County
283	Martin Marmgren	Green	Stockholm County
284	Camilla Brodin	Christian Democrats	Stockholm County
285	Alireza Akhondi	Centre	Stockholm County
286	Lotta Finstorp	Moderate	Södermanland County
287	Adam Marttinen	Sweden Democrats	Södermanland County
288	Johanna Haraldsson	Social Democrats	Jönköping County
289	Emma Hult	Green	Jönköping County
290	Carina Ödebrink	Social Democrats	Jönköping County
291	Acko Ankarberg Johansson	Christian Democrats	Jönköping County
292	Niklas Karlsson	Social Democrats	Skåne County West
293	Yasmine Bladelius	Social Democrats	Skåne County West
294	Michael Anefur	Christian Democrats	Skåne County West
295	Ulrika Heindorff	Moderate	Skåne County West
296	Mikael Eskilandersson	Sweden Democrats	Skåne County North and East
297	Maria Malmer Stenergard	Moderate	Skåne County North and East
298	Åsa Hartzell	Moderate	Gothenburg Municipality
299	Hampus Hagman	Christian Democrats	Gothenburg Municipality
300	Janine Alm Ericson	Green	Västra Götaland County West
301	Aron Emilsson	Sweden Democrats	Västra Götaland County West
302	Helena Gellerman	Liberals	Västra Götaland County West
303	Charlotte Quensel	Sweden Democrats	Västra Götaland County West
304	Erik Ezelius	Social Democrats	Västra Götaland County East
305	Jessica Thunander	Left	Västra Götaland County East
306	Helena Vilhelmsson	Centre	Örebro County
307	Hans Eklind	Christian Democrats	Örebro County
308	Roza Güclü Hedin	Social Democrats	Dalarna County
309	Peter Helander	Centre	Dalarna County
310	Roger Hedlund	Sweden Democrats	Gävleborg County
311	Patrik Lundqvist	Social Democrats	Gävleborg County
312	Hannah Bergstedt	Social Democrats	Norrbotten County
313	Eric Palmqvist	Sweden Democrats	Norrbotten County
314	Arin Karapet	Moderate	Stockholm Municipality
315	Henrik Vinge	Sweden Democrats	Stockholm Municipality
316	Yasmine Eriksson	Sweden Democrats	Stockholm Municipality
317	Joar Forssell	Liberals	Stockholm Municipality
318	Ida Gabrielsson	Left	Stockholm County
319	Ludvig Aspling	Sweden Democrats	Stockholm County
320	Josefin Malmqvist	Moderate	Stockholm County
321	Fredrik Lindahl	Sweden Democrats	Stockholm County
322	Ann-Sofie Lifvenhage	Moderate	Södermanland County
323	Roger Richtoff	Sweden Democrats	Södermanland County
324	Pia Steensland	Christian Democrats	Södermanland County
325	Martina Johansson	Centre	Södermanland County
326	Ciczie Weidby	Left	Jönköping County
327	Angelica Lundberg	Sweden Democrats	Jönköping County
328	Linda Lindberg	Sweden Democrats	Skåne County West
329	Ola Möller	Social Democrats	Skåne County West
330	Jonny Cato Hansson	Centre	Skåne County West
331	Ebba Hermansson	Sweden Democrats	Skåne County West
332	Anna Wallentheim	Social Democrats	Skåne County North and East
333	Sofia Nilsson	Centre	Skåne County North and East
334	Leila Ali Elmi	Green	Gothenburg Municipality
335	Tony Haddou	Left	Gothenburg Municipality
336	Sofia Westergren	Moderate	Västra Götaland County West
337	Joakim Järrebring	Social Democrats	Västra Götaland County West
338	Jessica Wetterling	Left	Västra Götaland County West
339	Paula Örn	Social Democrats	Västra Götaland County West
340	Ebba Busch	Christian Democrats	Uppsala County
341	Tobias Andersson	Sweden Democrats	Västra Götaland County East
342	Denis Begic	Social Democrats	Örebro County
343	Lena Rådström Baastad	Social Democrats	Örebro County
344	Lars Adaktusson	Christian Democrats	Dalarna County
345	Mats Nordberg	Sweden Democrats	Gävleborg County
346	Thomas Morell	Sweden Democrats	Gävleborg County
347	Viktor Wärnick	Moderate	Gävleborg County
348	Mattias Karlsson in Luleå	Moderate	Norrbotten County
349	Linda Modig	Centre	Norrbotten County

== List of elected MPs ==
Members originally elected in the 2018 general election:

Seat	Member of Parliament	Party	Constituency
1	Åsa Lindestam	Social Democrats	Gävleborg County
2	Lotta Johnsson Fornarve	Left	Södermanland County
3	Kerstin Lundgren	Centre	Stockholm County
4	Beatrice Ask	Moderate	Stockholm Municipality
5	Anders Ygeman	Social Democrats	Stockholm Municipality
6	Barbro Westerholm	Liberals	Stockholm County
7	Karin Enström	Moderate	Stockholm County
8	Mikael Oscarsson	Christian Democrats	Uppsala County
9	Johan Löfstrand	Social Democrats	Östergötland County
10	Betty Malmberg	Moderate	Östergötland County
11	Anders Åkesson	Centre	Kalmar County
12	Jan R. Andersson	Moderate	Kalmar County
13	Hanna Westerén	Social Democrats	Gotland County
14	Lars Thomsson	Centre	Gotland County
15	Morgan Johansson	Social Democrats	Skåne County South
16	Anders Hansson	Moderate	Skåne County South
17	Hans Hoff	Social Democrats	Halland County
18	Jennie Nilsson	Social Democrats	Halland County
19	Ann-Christin Ahlberg	Social Democrats	Västra Götaland County South
20	Jan Ericson	Moderate	Västra Götaland County South
21	Lars Mejern Larsson	Social Democrats	Värmland County
22	Gunilla Svantorp	Social Democrats	Värmland County
23	Pia Nilsson	Social Democrats	Västmanland County
24	Ylva Johansson	Social Democrats	Stockholm Municipality
25	Margareta Cederfelt	Moderate	Stockholm Municipality
26	Mikael Damberg	Social Democrats	Stockholm County
27	Gustav Fridolin	Green	Stockholm County
28	Jan Björklund	Liberals	Stockholm County
29	Per Lodenius	Centre	Stockholm County
30	Solveig Zander	Centre	Uppsala County
31	Andreas Norlén	Moderate	Östergötland County
32	Johan Andersson	Social Democrats	Östergötland County
33	Lena Hallengren	Social Democrats	Kalmar County
34	Mattias Bäckström Johansson	Sweden Democrats	Kalmar County
35	Laila Naraghi	Social Democrats	Kalmar County
36	Annicka Engblom	Moderate	Blekinge County
37	Richard Jomshof	Sweden Democrats	Blekinge County
38	Boriana Åberg	Moderate	Skåne County South
39	Ola Johansson	Centre	Halland County
40	Adnan Dibrani	Social Democrats	Halland County
41	Bengt Eliasson	Liberals	Halland County
42	Cecilie Tenfjord-Toftby	Moderate	Västra Götaland County South
43	Petter Löberg	Social Democrats	Västra Götaland County South
44	Patrik Jönsson	Sweden Democrats	Västra Götaland County South
45	Patrick Reslow	Sweden Democrats	Värmland County
46	Daniel Bäckström	Centre	Värmland County
47	Olle Thorell	Social Democrats	Västmanland County
48	Per Åsling	Centre	Jämtland County
49	Saila Quicklund	Moderate	Jämtland County
50	Ulf Kristersson	Moderate	Stockholm Municipality
51	Fredrik Malm	Liberals	Stockholm Municipality
52	Ibrahim Baylan	Social Democrats	Stockholm County
53	Tomas Tobé	Moderate	Stockholm County
54	Amineh Kakabaveh	Left	Stockholm County
55	Ingela Nylund Watz	Social Democrats	Stockholm County
56	Pyry Niemi	Social Democrats	Uppsala County
57	Jessika Roswall	Moderate	Uppsala County
58	Markus Wiechel	Sweden Democrats	Östergötland County
59	Magnus Oscarsson	Christian Democrats	Östergötland County
60	Anne Oskarsson	Sweden Democrats	Kalmar County
61	Tomas Kronståhl	Social Democrats	Kalmar County
62	Magnus Manhammar	Social Democrats	Blekinge County
63	Angelika Bengtsson	Sweden Democrats	Blekinge County
64	Rikard Larsson	Social Democrats	Skåne County South
65	Jennie Åfeldt	Sweden Democrats	Skåne County South
66	Jörgen Warborn	Moderate	Halland County
67	Larry Söder	Christian Democrats	Halland County
68	Lars Püss	Moderate	Halland County
69	Elisabeth Falkhaven	Green	Halland County
70	Ingemar Kihlström	Christian Democrats	Västra Götaland County South
71	Caroline Nordengrip	Sweden Democrats	Västra Götaland County South
72	Runar Filper	Sweden Democrats	Värmland County
73	Mikael Dahlqvist	Social Democrats	Värmland County
74	Jessica Polfjärd	Moderate	Västmanland County
75	Roger Haddad	Liberals	Västmanland County
76	Ingemar Nilsson	Social Democrats	Västernorrland County
77	Kristina Nilsson	Social Democrats	Västernorrland County
78	Anna-Caren Sätherberg	Social Democrats	Jämtland County
79	Kalle Olsson	Social Democrats	Jämtland County
80	Per Bolund	Green	Stockholm Municipality
81	Johan Forssell	Moderate	Stockholm Municipality
82	Robert Halef	Christian Democrats	Stockholm County
83	Julia Kronlid	Sweden Democrats	Stockholm County
84	Hanif Bali	Moderate	Stockholm County
85	Jakob Forssmed	Christian Democrats	Stockholm County
86	Marta Obminska	Moderate	Uppsala County
87	Ardalan Shekarabi	Social Democrats	Uppsala County
88	Mattias Ottosson	Social Democrats	Östergötland County
89	Linda Westerlund Snecker	Left	Östergötland County
90	Eskil Erlandsson	Centre	Kronoberg County
91	Jimmy Loord	Christian Democrats	Kalmar County
92	Hillevi Larsson	Social Democrats	Malmö Municipality
93	Heléne Björklund	Social Democrats	Blekinge County
94	Sofia Damm	Christian Democrats	Skåne County South
95	Mats Persson	Liberals	Skåne County South
96	Staffan Eklöf	Sweden Democrats	Halland County
97	Ulrika Jörgensen	Moderate	Halland County
98	Gunilla Carlsson	Social Democrats	Gothenburg Municipality
99	Hans Rothenberg	Moderate	Gothenburg Municipality
100	Jörgen Hellman	Social Democrats	Västra Götaland County North
101	Mikael Larsson	Centre	Västra Götaland County South
102	Håkan Svenneling	Left	Värmland County
103	Pål Jonson	Moderate	Värmland County
104	Åsa Coenraads	Moderate	Västmanland County
105	Oscar Sjöstedt	Sweden Democrats	Västmanland County
106	Christina Höj Larsen	Left	Västernorrland County
107	Johnny Skalin	Sweden Democrats	Västernorrland County
108	Cassandra Sundin	Sweden Democrats	Jämtland County
109	Helén Pettersson	Social Democrats	Västerbotten County
110	Jens Holm	Left	Stockholm Municipality
111	Caroline Szyber	Christian Democrats	Stockholm Municipality
112	Maria Arnholm	Liberals	Stockholm County
113	Maria Stockhaus	Moderate	Stockholm County
114	Magdalena Andersson	Social Democrats	Stockholm County
115	Leif Nysmed	Social Democrats	Stockholm County
116	Paula Bieler	Sweden Democrats	Uppsala County
117	Sanne Lennström	Social Democrats	Uppsala County
118	Teresa Carvalho	Social Democrats	Östergötland County
119	Eva Lindh	Social Democrats	Östergötland County
120	Tomas Eneroth	Social Democrats	Kronoberg County
121	Katarina Brännström	Moderate	Kronoberg County
122	Allan Widman	Liberals	Malmö Municipality
123	Tobias Billström	Moderate	Malmö Municipality
124	Kristina Yngwe	Centre	Skåne County South
125	Marianne Pettersson	Social Democrats	Skåne County South
126	Eric Westroth	Sweden Democrats	Halland County
127	Jon Thorbjörnson	Left	Halland County
128	Lars Hjälmered	Moderate	Gothenburg Municipality
129	Mattias Jonsson	Social Democrats	Gothenburg Municipality
130	Johan Hultberg	Moderate	Västra Götaland County North
131	Magnus Jacobsson	Christian Democrats	Västra Götaland County North
132	Marléne Lund Kopparklint	Moderate	Värmland County
133	Kjell-Arne Ottosson	Christian Democrats	Värmland County
134	Åsa Eriksson	Social Democrats	Västmanland County
135	Vasiliki Tsouplaki	Left	Västmanland County
136	Emil Källström	Centre	Västernorrland County
137	Stefan Löfven	Social Democrats	Västernorrland County
138	Jonas Sjöstedt	Left	Västerbotten County
139	Isak From	Social Democrats	Västerbotten County
140	Maria Ferm	Green	Stockholm Municipality
141	Jessica Rosencrantz	Moderate	Stockholm Municipality
142	Erik Andersson	Moderate	Stockholm County
143	Åsa Westlund	Social Democrats	Stockholm County
144	Niklas Wykman	Moderate	Stockholm County
145	Martin Kinnunen	Sweden Democrats	Stockholm County
146	Ilona Szatmari Waldau	Left	Uppsala County
147	Maria Gardfjell	Green	Uppsala County
148	Jörgen Grubb	Sweden Democrats	Östergötland County
149	Juno Blom	Liberals	Östergötland County
150	Sven-Olof Sällström	Sweden Democrats	Kronoberg County
151	Mattias Karlsson in Norrhult	Sweden Democrats	Kronoberg County
152	Per Ramhorn	Sweden Democrats	Malmö Municipality
153	Johanna Öfverbeck	Green	Malmö Municipality
154	Lars Andersson	Sweden Democrats	Skåne County South
155	Hanna Gunnarsson	Left	Skåne County South
156	Tuve Skånberg	Christian Democrats	Skåne County North and East
157	Rickard Nordin	Centre	Gothenburg Municipality
158	Anna Johansson	Social Democrats	Gothenburg Municipality
159	Maj Karlsson	Left	Gothenburg Municipality
160	Paula Holmqvist	Social Democrats	Västra Götaland County North
161	Jimmy Ståhl	Sweden Democrats	Västra Götaland County North
162	Arman Teimouri	Liberals	Värmland County
163	Johan Pehrson	Liberals	Örebro County
164	Matilda Ernkrans	Social Democrats	Örebro County
165	Ann-Christine From Utterstedt	Sweden Democrats	Västmanland County
166	Jörgen Berglund	Moderate	Västernorrland County
167	Malin Larsson	Social Democrats	Västernorrland County
168	Helena Lindahl	Centre	Västerbotten County
169	Edward Riedl	Moderate	Västerbotten County
170	Teres Lindberg	Social Democrats	Stockholm Municipality
171	Ali Esbati	Left	Stockholm Municipality
172	Johan Hedin	Centre	Stockholm Municipality
173	Karin Rågsjö	Left	Stockholm Municipality
174	Alexandra Völker	Social Democrats	Stockholm County
175	Ida Drougge	Moderate	Stockholm County
176	Robert Stenkvist	Sweden Democrats	Stockholm County
177	Serkan Köse	Social Democrats	Stockholm County
178	Marlene Burwick	Social Democrats	Uppsala County
179	Lina Nordquist	Liberals	Uppsala County
180	Jonas Andersson i Linköping	Sweden Democrats	Östergötland County
181	Rebecka Le Moine	Green	Östergötland County
182	Monica Haider	Social Democrats	Kronoberg County
183	Helena Bouveng	Moderate	Jönköping County
184	Jamal El-Haj	Social Democrats	Malmö Municipality
185	Momodou Malcolm Jallow	Left	Malmö Municipality
186	Emma Berginger	Green	Skåne County South
187	Clara Aranda	Sweden Democrats	Skåne County South
188	Christer Nylander	Liberals	Skåne County North and East
189	Hans Wallmark	Moderate	Skåne County North and East
190	Johan Büser	Social Democrats	Gothenburg Municipality
191	Robert Hannah	Liberals	Gothenburg Municipality
192	Dennis Dioukarev	Sweden Democrats	Gothenburg Municipality
193	Yasmine Posio	Left	Gothenburg Municipality
194	Fredrik Christensson	Centre	Västra Götaland County North
195	Mats Wiking	Social Democrats	Västra Götaland County North
196	Carina Ohlsson	Social Democrats	Västra Götaland County East
197	Cecilia Widegren	Moderate	Västra Götaland County East
198	Elisabeth Svantesson	Moderate	Örebro County
199	Mia Sydow Mölleby	Left	Örebro County
200	Peter Hultqvist	Social Democrats	Dalarna County
201	Carl-Oskar Bohlin	Moderate	Dalarna County
202	Elisabeth Björnsdotter Rahm	Moderate	Västerbotten County
203	Björn Wiechel	Social Democrats	Västerbotten County
204	Jonas Andersson i Skellefteå	Sweden Democrats	Västerbotten County
205	Åsa Karlsson	Social Democrats	Västerbotten County
206	Johanna Jönsson	Centre	Stockholm Municipality
207	Nooshi Dadgostar	Left	Stockholm Municipality
208	Lawen Redar	Social Democrats	Stockholm Municipality
209	Anders Österberg	Social Democrats	Stockholm Municipality
210	Mathias Tegnér	Social Democrats	Stockholm County
211	Erik Ottoson	Moderate	Stockholm County
212	Alexandra Anstrell	Moderate	Stockholm County
213	Kjell Jansson	Moderate	Stockholm County
214	Michael Rubbestad	Sweden Democrats	Uppsala County
215	Fredrik Olovsson	Social Democrats	Södermanland County
216	Magnus Ek	Centre	Östergötland County
217	John Weinerhall	Moderate	Östergötland County
218	Annie Lööf	Centre	Jönköping County
219	Emma Carlsson Löfdahl	Liberals	Jönköping County
220	Joakim Sandell	Social Democrats	Malmö Municipality
221	Niels Paarup-Petersen	Centre	Malmö Municipality
222	Louise Meijer	Moderate	Skåne County South
223	Ann-Charlotte Hammar Johnsson	Moderate	Skåne County West
224	Annelie Karlsson	Social Democrats	Skåne County North and East
225	Björn Söder	Sweden Democrats	Skåne County North and East
226	Anna Sibinska	Green	Gothenburg Municipality
227	Marie-Louise Hänel Sandström	Moderate	Gothenburg Municipality
228	Annika Qarlsson	Centre	Västra Götaland County West
229	Ann-Sofie Alm	Moderate	Västra Götaland County North
230	Matheus Enholm	Sweden Democrats	Västra Götaland County North
231	Elin Segerlind	Left	Västra Götaland County North
232	Patrik Björck	Social Democrats	Västra Götaland County East
233	Ulrika Heie	Centre	Västra Götaland County East
234	Jonas Eriksson	Green	Örebro County
235	David Lång	Sweden Democrats	Örebro County
236	Ann-Britt Åsebol	Moderate	Dalarna County
237	Maria Strömkvist	Social Democrats	Dalarna County
238	Ulla Andersson	Left	Gävleborg County
239	Anders W. Jonsson	Centre	Gävleborg County
240	Fredrik Lundh Sammeli	Social Democrats	Norrbotten County
241	Sven-Erik Bucht	Social Democrats	Norrbotten County
242	Gulan Avci	Liberals	Stockholm County
243	Dag Larsson	Social Democrats	Stockholm Municipality
244	Kristina Axén Olin	Moderate	Stockholm Municipality
245	Isabella Lövin	Green	Stockholm Municipality
246	Mikael Strandman	Sweden Democrats	Stockholm County
247	Bo Broman	Sweden Democrats	Stockholm County
248	Helene Hellmark Knutsson	Social Democrats	Stockholm County
249	Alice Bah Kuhnke	Green	Stockholm County
250	Caroline Helmersson Olsson	Social Democrats	Södermanland County
251	Hans Ekström	Social Democrats	Södermanland County
252	Peter Persson	Social Democrats	Jönköping County
253	Jimmie Åkesson	Sweden Democrats	Jönköping County
254	Andreas Carlson	Christian Democrats	Jönköping County
255	Mats Green	Moderate	Jönköping County
256	Sara Gille	Sweden Democrats	Malmö Municipality
257	Noria Manouchi	Moderate	Malmö Municipality
258	Carina Ståhl Herrstedt	Sweden Democrats	Skåne County West
259	Torkild Strandberg	Liberals	Skåne County West
260	Per-Arne Håkansson	Social Democrats	Skåne County North and East
261	Christina Östberg	Sweden Democrats	Skåne County North and East
262	Maria Nilsson	Liberals	Gothenburg Municipality
263	Alexander Christiansson	Sweden Democrats	Gothenburg Municipality
264	Kenneth G. Forslund	Social Democrats	Västra Götaland County West
265	Roland Utbult	Christian Democrats	Västra Götaland County West
266	Ellen Juntti	Moderate	Västra Götaland County West
267	Camilla Waltersson Grönvall	Moderate	Västra Götaland County West
268	Sten Bergheden	Moderate	Västra Götaland County East
269	Josef Fransson	Sweden Democrats	Västra Götaland County East
270	Lotta Olsson	Moderate	Örebro County
271	Jonas Millard	Sweden Democrats	Örebro County
272	Magnus Persson	Sweden Democrats	Dalarna County
273	Daniel Riazat	Left	Dalarna County
274	Elin Lundgren	Social Democrats	Gävleborg County
275	Lars Beckman	Moderate	Gävleborg County
276	Birger Lahti	Left	Norrbotten County
277	Emilia Töyrä	Social Democrats	Norrbotten County
278	Martin Ådahl	Centre	Stockholm Municipality
279	Katja Nyberg	Sweden Democrats	Stockholm Municipality
280	Kadir Kasirga	Social Democrats	Stockholm Municipality
281	Annika Strandhäll	Social Democrats	Stockholm Municipality
282	Lorena Delgado Varas	Left	Stockholm County
283	Karolina Skog	Green	Stockholm County
284	Camilla Brodin	Christian Democrats	Stockholm County
285	Alireza Akhondi	Centre	Stockholm County
286	Lotta Finstorp	Moderate	Södermanland County
287	Adam Marttinen	Sweden Democrats	Södermanland County
288	Johanna Haraldsson	Social Democrats	Jönköping County
289	Emma Hult	Green	Jönköping County
290	Carina Ödebrink	Social Democrats	Jönköping County
291	Acko Ankarberg Johansson	Christian Democrats	Jönköping County
292	Niklas Karlsson	Social Democrats	Skåne County West
293	Yasmine Bladelius	Social Democrats	Skåne County West
294	Michael Anefur	Christian Democrats	Skåne County West
295	Ulrika Heindorff	Moderate	Skåne County West
296	Mikael Eskilandersson	Sweden Democrats	Skåne County North and East
297	Maria Malmer Stenergard	Moderate	Skåne County North and East
298	David Josefsson	Moderate	Gothenburg Municipality
299	Hampus Hagman	Christian Democrats	Gothenburg Municipality
300	Janine Alm Ericson	Green	Västra Götaland County West
301	Aron Emilsson	Sweden Democrats	Västra Götaland County West
302	Helena Gellerman	Liberals	Västra Götaland County West
303	Charlotte Quensel	Sweden Democrats	Västra Götaland County West
304	Erik Ezelius	Social Democrats	Västra Götaland County East
305	Jessica Thunander	Left	Västra Götaland County East
306	Helena Vilhelmsson	Centre	Örebro County
307	Hans Eklind	Christian Democrats	Örebro County
308	Patrik Engström	Social Democrats	Dalarna County
309	Peter Helander	Centre	Dalarna County
310	Roger Hedlund	Sweden Democrats	Gävleborg County
311	Patrik Lundqvist	Social Democrats	Gävleborg County
312	Ida Karkiainen	Social Democrats	Norrbotten County
313	Eric Palmqvist	Sweden Democrats	Norrbotten County
314	Arin Karapet	Moderate	Stockholm Municipality
315	Henrik Vinge	Sweden Democrats	Stockholm Municipality
316	Yasmine Eriksson	Sweden Democrats	Stockholm Municipality
317	Joar Forssell	Liberals	Stockholm Municipality
318	Ida Gabrielsson	Left	Stockholm County
319	Ludvig Aspling	Sweden Democrats	Stockholm County
320	Josefin Malmqvist	Moderate	Stockholm County
321	Fredrik Lindahl	Sweden Democrats	Stockholm County
322	Erik Bengtzboe	Moderate	Södermanland County
323	Roger Richtoff	Independent	Södermanland County
324	Pia Steensland	Christian Democrats	Södermanland County
325	Martina Johansson	Centre	Södermanland County
326	Ciczie Weidby	Left	Jönköping County
327	Angelica Lundberg	Sweden Democrats	Jönköping County
328	Linda Lindberg	Sweden Democrats	Skåne County West
329	Ola Möller	Social Democrats	Skåne County West
330	Jonny Cato Hansson	Centre	Skåne County West
331	Ebba Hermansson	Sweden Democrats	Skåne County West
332	Anna Wallentheim	Social Democrats	Skåne County North and East
333	Sofia Nilsson	Centre	Skåne County North and East
334	Leila Ali Elmi	Green	Gothenburg Municipality
335	Tony Haddou	Left	Gothenburg Municipality
336	Sofia Westergren	Moderate	Västra Götaland County West
337	Joakim Järrebring	Social Democrats	Västra Götaland County West
338	Jessica Wetterling	Left	Västra Götaland County West
339	Aylin Fazelian	Social Democrats	Västra Götaland County West
340	Ebba Busch Thor	Christian Democrats	Uppsala County
341	Tobias Andersson	Sweden Democrats	Västra Götaland County East
342	Denis Begic	Social Democrats	Örebro County
343	Lena Rådström Baastad	Social Democrats	Örebro County
344	Lars Adaktusson	Christian Democrats	Dalarna County
345	Mats Nordberg	Sweden Democrats	Gävleborg County
346	Thomas Morell	Sweden Democrats	Gävleborg County
347	Viktor Wärnick	Moderate	Gävleborg County
348	Mattias Karlsson in Luleå	Moderate	Norrbotten County
349	Linda Modig	Centre	Norrbotten County

== Members who resigned and their successors ==
Below are listed members who resigned and their subsequent successors.

Seat	Member of Parliament	From	To	Party	Constituency	Successor
111	Caroline Szyber	24 September 2018	24 September 2018	Christian Democrats	Stockholm Municipality	Désirée Pethrus
259	Torkild Strandberg	24 September 2018	25 September 2018	Liberals	Skåne County West	Tina Acketoft
142	Erik Andersson	24 September 2018	11 November 2018	Moderate	Stockholm County	Magdalena Schröder
241	Sven-Erik Bucht	24 September 2018	30 January 2019	Social Democrats	Norrbotten County	Linus Sköld
271	Jonas Millard	24 September 2018	31 January 2019	Sweden Democrats	Örebro County	Per Söderlund
90	Eskil Erlandsson	24 September 2018	12 March 2019	Centre	Kronoberg County	Per Schöldberg
91	Jimmy Loord	24 September 2018	31 March 2019	Christian Democrats	Kalmar County	Gudrun Brunegård
322	Erik Bengtzboe	24 September 2018	26 April 2019	Moderate	Södermanland County	Jari Puustinen
322	Jari Puustinen	26 April 2019	2 May 2019	Moderate	Södermanland County	Ann-Sofie Lifvenhage
249	Alice Bah Kuhnke	24 September 2018	18 June 2019	Green	Stockholm County	Annika Hirvonen Falk
66	Jörgen Warborn	24 September 2018	1 July 2019	Moderate	Halland County	Helena Antoni
74	Jessica Polfjärd	24 September 2018	1 July 2019	Moderate	Västmanland County	Mikael Damsgaard
53	Tomas Tobé	24 September 2018	1 July 2019	Moderate	Stockholm County	Fredrik Schulte
24	Ylva Johansson	24 September 2018	5 September 2019	Social Democrats	Stockholm Municipality	Thomas Hammarberg
27	Gustav Fridolin	24 September 2018	30 September 2019	Green	Stockholm County	Amanda Palmstierna
28	Jan Björklund	24 September 2018	31 October 2019	Liberals	Stockholm County	Nina Lundström
234	Jonas Eriksson	24 September 2018	3 November 2019	Green	Örebro County	Camilla Hansén
4	Beatrice Ask	24 September 2018	31 December 2019	Moderate	Stockholm Municipality	Lars Jilmstad
112	Maria Arnholm	24 September 2018	31 January 2020	Liberals	Stockholm County	Malin Danielsson
116	Paula Bieler	24 September 2018	2 February 2020	Sweden Democrats	Uppsala County	David Perez
180	Kadir Kasirga	24 September 2018	8 March 2020	Social Democrats	Stockholm Municipality	Sultan Kayhan
248	Helene Hellmark Knutsson	24 September 2018	31 July 2020	Social Democrats	Stockholm County	Anna Vikström
252	Peter Persson	24 September 2018	31 August 2020	Social Democrats	Jönköping County	Thomas Strand
252	Thomas Strand	1 September 2020	1 September 2020	Social Democrats	Jönköping County	Diana Laitinen Carlsson
138	Jonas Sjöstedt	24 September 2018	3 November 2020	Left	Västerbotten County	Gudrun Nordborg
30	Solveig Zander	24 September 2018	31 December 2020	Centre	Uppsala County	Catarina Deremar
245	Isabella Lövin	24 September 2018	31 January 2021	Green	Stockholm Municipality	Lorentz Tovatt
286	Lotta Finstorp	24 September 2018	31 January 2021	Moderate	Södermanland County	Magnus Stuart
111	Désirée Pethrus	24 September 2018	11 February 2021	Christian Democrats	Stockholm Municipality	Christian Carlsson
219	Emma Carlsson Löfdahl	24 September 2018	31 July 2021	Independent	Jönköping County	Jakob Olofsgård
76	Ingemar Nilsson	24 September 2018	31 August 2021	Social Democrats	Västernorrland County	Jasenko Omanović
206	Johanna Jönsson	24 September 2018	2 September 2021	Centre	Stockholm Municipality	Malin Björk
343	Lena Rådström Baastad	24 September 2018	2 September 2021	Social Democrats	Örebro County	Daniel Andersson
136	Emil Källström	24 September 2018	13 September 2021	Centre	Västernorrland County	Anne-Li Sjölund
29	Per Lodenius	24 September 2018	30 September 2021	Centre	Stockholm County	Aphram Melki
137	Stefan Löfven	24 September 2018	16 November 2021	Social Democrats	Västernorrland County	Anna-Belle Strömberg
331	Ebba Hermansson	24 September 2018	16 December 2021	Sweden Democrats	Skåne County West	Pontus Andersson
308	Patrik Engström	24 September 2018	9 January 2022	Social Democrats	Dalarna County	Roza Güclü Hedin
283	Karolina Skog	24 September 2018	10 January 2022	Green	Stockholm County	Martin Marmgren
24	Thomas Hammarberg	5 September 2019	31 January 2022	Social Democrats	Stockholm Municipality	Mattias Vepsä
53	Fredrik Schulte	2 July 2019	22 March 2022	Moderate	Stockholm County	Richard Herrey
243	Dag Larsson	24 September 2018	7 June 2022	Social Democrats	Stockholm Municipality	Elsemarie Bjellqvist
100	Jörgen Hellman	24 September 2018	10 June 2022	Social Democrats	Västra Götaland County North	Karin Engdahl
52	Ibrahim Baylan	24 September 2018	28 June 2022	Social Democrats	Stockholm County	Azadeh Rojhan Gustafsson

== Substitutes ==
Below are substitutes who served for regular members.

Seat	Member of Parliament	From	To	Party	Constituency	Substituting for
120	ClasGöran Carlsson	24 September 2018	26 September 2022	Social Democrats	Stockholm County	Tomas Eneroth
15	Elin Gustafsson	24 September 2018	26 September 2022	Social Democrats	Skåne County South	Morgan Johansson
200	Roza Güclü Hedin	24 September 2018	9 January 2022	Social Democrats	Dalarna County	Peter Hultqvist
24	Thomas Hammarberg	24 September 2018	4 September 2019	Social Democrats	Stockholm Municipality	Ylva Johansson
249	Annika Hirvonen Falk	24 September 2018	21 January 2019	Green	Stockholm County	Alice Bah Kuhnke
283	Annica Hjerling	24 September 2018	21 January 2019	Green	Stockholm County	Karolina Skog
281	Sultan Kayhan	24 September 2018	5 September 2019	Social Democrats	Stockholm Municipality	Annika Strandhäll
87	Gustaf Lantz	24 September 2018	23 August 2020	Social Democrats	Uppsala County	Ardalan Shekarabi
80	Åsa Lindhagen	24 September 2018	21 January 2019	Green	Stockholm Municipality	Per Bolund
26	Anders Lönnberg	24 September 2018	21 January 2019	Social Democrats	Stockholm County	Mikael Damberg
137	Jasenko Omanović	24 September 2018	31 August 2021	Social Democrats	Västernorrland County	Stefan Löfven
27	Amanda Palmstierna	24 September 2018	21 January 2019	Green	Stockholm County	Gustav Fridolin
33	Björn Petersson	24 September 2018	26 September 2022	Social Democrats	Kalmar County	Lena Hallengren
248	Azadeh Rojhan Gustafsson	24 September 2018	21 January 2019	Social Democrats	Stockholm County	Helene Hellmark Knutsson
52	Markus Selin	24 September 2018	21 January 2019	Social Democrats	Stockholm County	Ibrahim Baylan
241	Linus Sköld	24 September 2018	21 January 2019	Social Democrats	Norrbotten County	Sven-Erik Bucht
245	Lorentz Tovatt	24 September 2018	31 January 2021	Green	Stockholm Municipality	Isabella Lövin
114	Anna Vikström	24 September 2018	31 July 2020	Social Democrats	Stockholm County	Magdalena Andersson
31	John Widegren	24 September 2018	26 September 2022	Moderate	Östergötland County	Andreas Norlén
111	Christian Carlsson	24 September 2018	31 December 2018	Christian Democrats	Stockholm Municipality	Désirée Pethrus
291	Mattias Ingeson	24 September 2018	22 October 2018	Christian Democrats	Jönköping County	Acko Ankarberg Johansson
174	Marie Axelsson	15 October 2018	21 January 2019	Social Democrats	Stockholm County	Alexandra Völker
293	Lena Emilsson	25 November 2018	31 May 2019	Social Democrats	Skåne Western	Yasmine Bladelius
203	Fredrik Stenberg	1 December 2018	1 January 2019	Social Democrats	Västerbotten County	Björn Wiechel
79	Maria Jacobsson	13 December 2018	13 January 2019	Social Democrats	Jämtland County	Kalle Olsson
172	Abir Al-Sahlani	14 January 2019	19 June 2019	Centre	Stockholm Municipality	Johan Hedin
35	Nermina Mizimovic	22 January 2019	7 May 2019	Social Democrats	Kalmar County	Laila Naraghi
174	Markus Selin	22 January 2019	31 January 2019	Social Democrats	Stockholm County	Alexandra Völker
164	Daniel Andersson	22 January 2019	2 September 2021	Social Democrats	Örebro County	Matilda Ernkrans
18	Sara Heikkinen Breitholtz	22 January 2019	30 June 2021	Social Democrats	Halland County	Jennie Nilsson
52	Azadeh Rojhan Gustafsson	22 January 2019	31 January 2019	Social Democrats	Stockholm County	Ibrahim Baylan
80	Pernilla Stålhammar	22 January 2019	30 November 2021	Green	Stockholm Municipality	Per Bolund
5	Mattias Vepsä	22 January 2019	14 July 2019	Social Democrats	Stockholm Municipality	Anders Ygeman
140	Mats Berglund	23 January 2019	30 November 2021	Green	Stockholm Municipality	Maria Ferm
26	Azadeh Rojhan Gustafsson	1 February 2019	31 July 2020	Social Democrats	Stockholm County	Mikael Damberg
52	Markus Selin	1 February 2019	31 July 2020	Social Democrats	Stockholm County	Ibrahim Baylan
174	Marie Axelsson	1 February 2019	31 July 2019	Social Democrats	Stockholm County	Alexandra Völker
118	Erica Nådin	11 February 2019	30 November 2019	Social Democrats	Östergötland County	Teresa Carvalho
175	Fredrik Schulte	11 February 2019	1 July 2019	Moderate	Stockholm County	Ida Drougge
266	Johanna Rantsi	18 February 2019	11 April 2019	Moderate	Västra Götaland County West	Ellen Juntti
128	Åsa Hartzell	25 February 2019	10 May 2019	Moderate	Gothenburg Municipality	Lars Hjälmered
277	Hannah Bergstedt	26 February 2019	30 November 2019	Social Democrats	Norrbotten County	Emilia Töyrä
191	Henrik Edin	13 March 2019	17 May 2019	Liberals	Gothenburg Municipality	Robert Hannah
319	Katarina Olofsson	28 May 2019	27 June 2019	Sweden Democrats	Stockholm County	Ludvig Aspling
175	Richard Herrey	2 July 2019	9 September 2019	Moderate	Stockholm County	Ida Drougge
5	Elsemarie Bjellqvist	15 July 2019	4 September 2019	Social Democrats	Stockholm Municipality	Anders Ygeman
207	Andreas Lennkvist Manriquez	19 August 2019	29 February 2020	Left	Stockholm Municipality	Nooshi Dadgostar
141	Lars Jilmstad	26 August 2019	31 December 2019	Moderate	Stockholm Municipality	Jessica Rosencrantz
5	Sultan Kayhan	5 September 2019	8 March 2020	Social Democrats	Stockholm Municipality	Anders Ygeman
281	Elsemarie Bjellqvist	5 September 2019	1 October 2019	Social Democrats	Stockholm Municipality	Annika Strandhäll
130	Lars-Arne Staxäng	9 September 2019	1 March 2020	Moderate	Västra Götaland County North	Johan Hultberg
329	Lena Emilsson	4 October 2019	3 November 2019	Social Democrats	Skåne Western	Ola Möller
117	Inga-Lill Sjöblom	21 October 2019	17 May 2020	Social Democrats	Uppsala County	Sanne Lennström
35	Nermina Mizimovic	11 November 2019	14 February 2020	Social Democrats	Kalmar County	Laila Naraghi
218	Göran Lindell	13 December 2019	31 August 2020	Centre	Jönköping County	Annie Lööf
203	Fredrik Stenberg	20 December 2019	9 August 2020	Social Democrats	Västerbotten County	Björn Wiechel
141	Amir Adan	1 January 2020	3 May 2020	Moderate	Stockholm Municipality	Jessica Rosencrantz
85	Marcus Jonsson	14 January 2020	20 February 2020	Christian Democrats	Stockholm County	Jakob Forssmed
294	Cecilia Engström	14 January 2020	30 August 2020	Christian Democrats	Skåne Western	Michael Anefur
254	Mattias Ingeson	16 January 2020	18 March 2020	Christian Democrats	Jönköping County	Andreas Carlson
116	Monika Lövgren	29 February 2020	28 February 2021	Sweden Democrats	Uppsala County	David Perez
12	Harald Hjalmarsson	9 March 2020	21 June 2020	Moderate	Kalmar County	Jan R.Andersson
5	Mattias Vepsä	9 March 2020	31 January 2022	Social Democrats	Stockholm Municipality	Anders Ygeman
124	Stina Larsson	7 April 2020	29 November 2020	Centre	Skåne Western	Kristina Yngwe
153	Johanna Öfverbeck	4 May 2020	31 December 2020	Green	Malmö Municipality	Rasmus Ling
114	Azadeh Rojhan Gustafsson	1 August 2020	27 June 2022	Social Democrats	Stockholm County	Magdalena Andersson
26	Markus Selin	1 August 2020	27 June 2022	Social Democrats	Stockholm County	Mikael Damberg
52	Abraham Halef	1 August 2020	30 November 2021	Social Democrats	Stockholm County	Ibrahim Baylan
87	Inga-Lill Sjöblom	24 August 2020	15 December 2020	Social Democrats	Uppsala County	Ardalan Shekarabi
201	Malin Höglund	31 August 2020	1 February 2021	Moderate	Dalarna County	Carl-Oskar Bohlin
293	Lena Emilsson	1 September 2020	30 April 2021	Social Democrats	Skåne Western	Yasmine Bladelius
61	Nermina Mizimovic	8 September 2020	1 December 2020	Social Democrats	Kalmar County	Thomas Kronståhl
136	Anne-Li Sjölund	22 September 2020	31 March 2021	Centre	Västernorrland County	Emil Källström
215	Inge Ståhlgren	2 October 2020	8 September 2021	Social Democrats	Södermanland County	Fredrik Olovsson
295	Mats Sander	2 November 2020	2 May 2021	Moderate	Skåne Western	Ulrika Heindorff
210	Solange Olame Bayibsa	1 December 2020	31 May 2021	Social Democrats	Stockholm County	Mathias Tegnér
211	Richard Herrey	8 December 2020	31 January 2021	Moderate	Stockholm County	Erik Ottoson
87	Gustaf Lantz	16 December 2020	26 September 2022	Social Democrats	Uppsala County	Ardalan Shekarabi
172	Hannes Hervieu	1 January 2021	28 February 2021	Centre	Stockholm Municipality	Johan Hedin
222	Emma Ahlström Köster	1 January 2021	23 May 2021	Moderate	Skåne County South	Louise Meijer
300	Nicklas Attefjord	9 February 2021	30 November 2021	Green	Västra Götaland County West	Janine Alm Ericson
277	Hannah Bergstedt	15 March 2021	27 August 2021	Social Democrats	Norrbotten County	Emilia Töyrä
86	Ulrika Karlsson	26 April 2021	8 April 2022	Moderate	Uppsala County	Marta Obminska
174	Daniel Färm	10 May 2021	31 May 2021	Social Democrats	Stockholm County	Alexandra Völker
174	Solange Olame Bayibsa	1 June 2021	30 November 2021	Social Democrats	Stockholm County	Alexandra Völker
339	Paula Örn	1 July 2021	17 December 2021	Social Democrats	Västra Götaland County West	Aylin Fazelian
137	Anna-Belle Strömberg	1 September 2021	15 November 2021	Social Democrats	Västernorrland County	Stefan Löfven
298	Åsa Hartzell	1 September 2021	30 November 2021	Moderate	Gothenburg Municipality	David Josefsson
164	Eva-Lena Jansson	3 September 2021	26 September 2022	Social Democrats	Örebro County	Matilda Ernkrans
215	Sofia Amloh	8 September 2021	26 September 2022	Social Democrats	Södermanland County	Fredrik Olovsson
181	Margareta Fransson	19 September 2021	15 May 2022	Green	Östergötland County	Rebecka Le Moine
186	Axel Hallberg	20 September 2021	19 May 2022	Green	Skåne County South	Emma Berginger
256	Stefan Plath	27 September 2021	26 September 2022	Sweden Democrats	Malmö Municipality	Sara Gille
58	Christina Nilsson	20 October 2021	24 November 2021	Sweden Democrats	Östergötland County	Markus Wiechel
92	Marie Granlund	20 October 2021	26 September 2022	Social Democrats	Malmö Municipality	Hillevi Larsson
311	Kristoffer Lindberg	1 November 2021	19 December 2021	Social Democrats	Gävleborg County	Patrik Lundqvist
111	Ulf Lönnberg	15 November 2021	28 January 2022	Christian Democrats	Stockholm Municipality	Christian Carlsson
312	Hannah Bergstedt	30 November 2021	26 September 2022	Social Democrats	Norrbotten County	Ida Karkiainen
281	Elsemarie Bjellqvist	30 November 2021	31 January 2022	Social Democrats	Stockholm Municipality	Annika Strandhäll
78	Anders Frimert	30 November 2021	26 September 2022	Social Democrats	Jämtland County	Anna-Caren Sätherberg
174	Abraham Halef	30 November 2021	6 February 2022	Social Democrats	Stockholm County	Alexandra Völker
201	Ulrik Bergman	2 December 2021	13 February 2022	Moderate	Dalarna County	Carl-Oskar Bohlin
142	Richard Herrey	10 December 2021	22 March 2022	Moderate	Stockholm County	Magdalena Schröder
200	Sofie Eriksson	10 January 2022	26 September 2022	Social Democrats	Dalarna County	Peter Hultqvist
5	Elsemarie Bjellqvist	1 February 2022	7 June 2022	Social Democrats	Stockholm Municipality	Anders Ygeman
281	Alexander Ojanne	1 February 2022	7 June 2022	Social Democrats	Stockholm Municipality	Annika Strandhäll
295	Mats Sander	14 March 2022	29 May 2022	Moderate	Skåne Western	Ulrika Heindorff
142	Jasmin Farid	23 March 2022	1 August 2022	Moderate	Stockholm County	Magdalena Schröder
62	Suzanne Svensson	28 March 2022	15 May 2022	Social Democrats	Blekinge County	Magnus Manhammar
48	Hanna Wagenius	4 April 2022	6 May 2022	Centre	Jämtland County	Per Åsling
220	Mubarik Mohamed Abdirahman	19 April 2022	22 May 2022	Social Democrats	Malmö Municipality	Joakim Sandell
344	Lennart Sacrédeus	5 May 2022	23 June 2022	Christian Democrats	Dalarna County	Lars Adaktusson
86	Ulrika Karlsson	6 May 2022	30 June 2022	Moderate	Uppsala County	Marta Obminska
5	Alexander Ojanne	8 June 2022	26 September 2022	Social Democrats	Stockholm Municipality	Anders Ygeman
281	Andrea Törnestam	8 June 2022	26 September 2022	Social Democrats	Stockholm Municipality	Annika Strandhäll
114	Markus Selin	28 June 2022	26 September 2022	Social Democrats	Stockholm County	Magdalena Andersson
26	Abraham Halef	28 June 2022	26 September 2022	Social Democrats	Stockholm County	Mikael Damberg
