= Christina Nilsson (disambiguation) =

Christina Nilsson (1843–1921) was a Swedish operatic soprano.

Christina Nilsson may also refer to:

- Christina Nilsson (soprano, born 1990), Swedish operatic soprano
- Christina Nilsson (shipwreck), schooner that sank in Lake Michigan in 1884
- Christina Nilsson (politician) (born 1956), Swedish politician of the Sweden Democrats
- Kristina Nilsson (politician) (born 1965), Swedish politician of the Social Democratic Party
