= Solange Olame Bayibsa =

Swedish politician (born 1987)

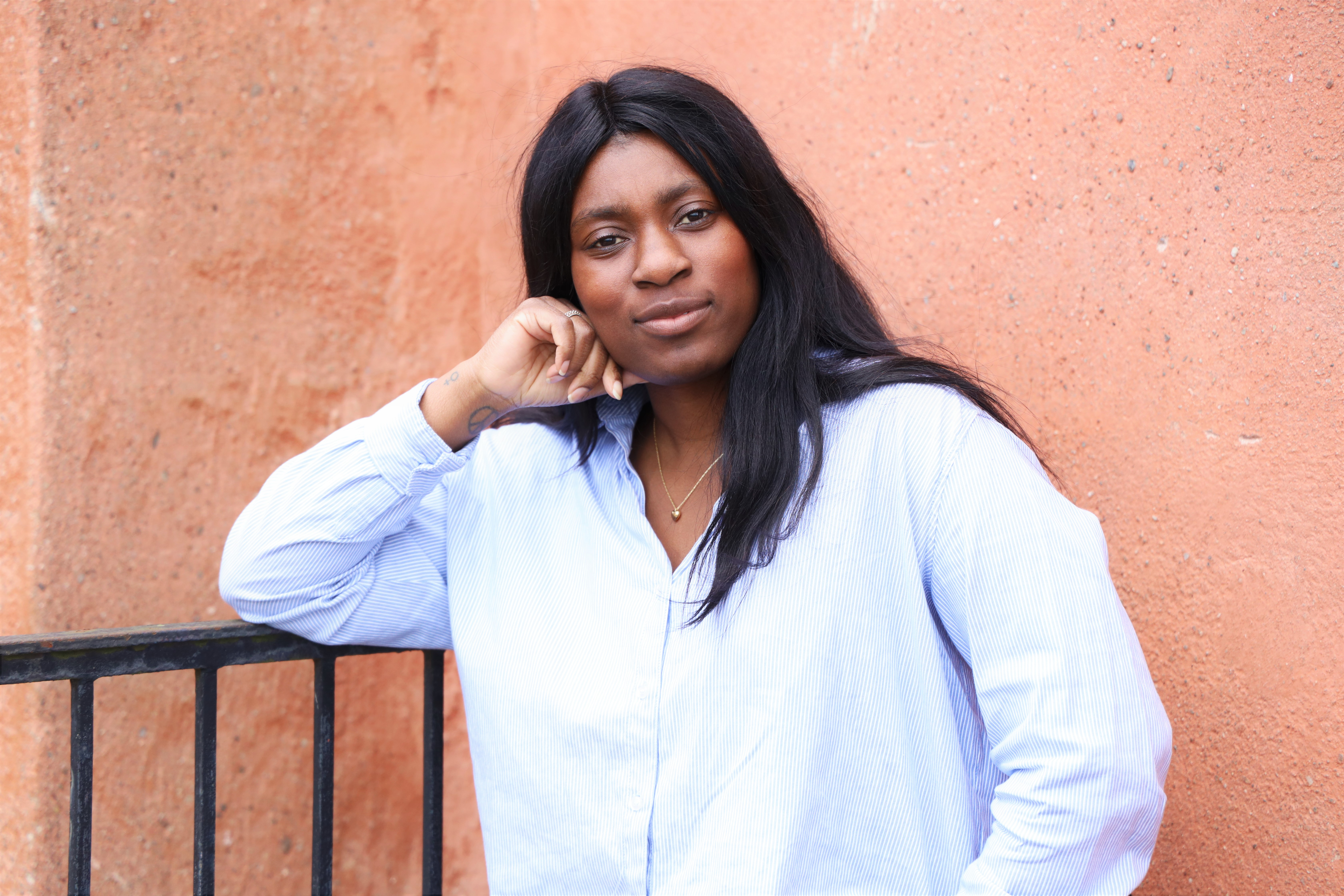

Member of the Riksdag
- In office 26 September 2022 – 18 October 2022
- Constituency: Stockholm County

Personal details
- Born: 7 August 1987 (age 38) Tanzania
- Party: Social Democratic Party

Solange Olame Bayibsa (born 7 August 1987) is a Tanzanian-born Swedish politician from the Swedish Social Democratic Party. She was a member of parliament from 2020 to 2021 (serving as a substitute) and 2022 (serving as a Cabinet substitute), elected for the Stockholm County constituency.

In 2015, she became the first Afro-Swedish person to lead a municipality.

Bayibsa ran in the 2018 and 2022 parliamentary elections, and became a substitute. She was acting deputy in the Riksdag for Mathias Tegnér from 1 December 2020 – 31 May 2021 and for Alexandra Völker from 1 June–30 November 2021 as well as acting deputy for Mikael Damberg from 26 September–18 October 2022.

In the Riksdag, Bayibsa was a member of the Committee on Finance.

== See also ==
- List of members of the Riksdag, 2018–2022
- List of members of the Riksdag, 2022–2026
