= Nermina Mizimovic =

Swedish politician (born 1973)

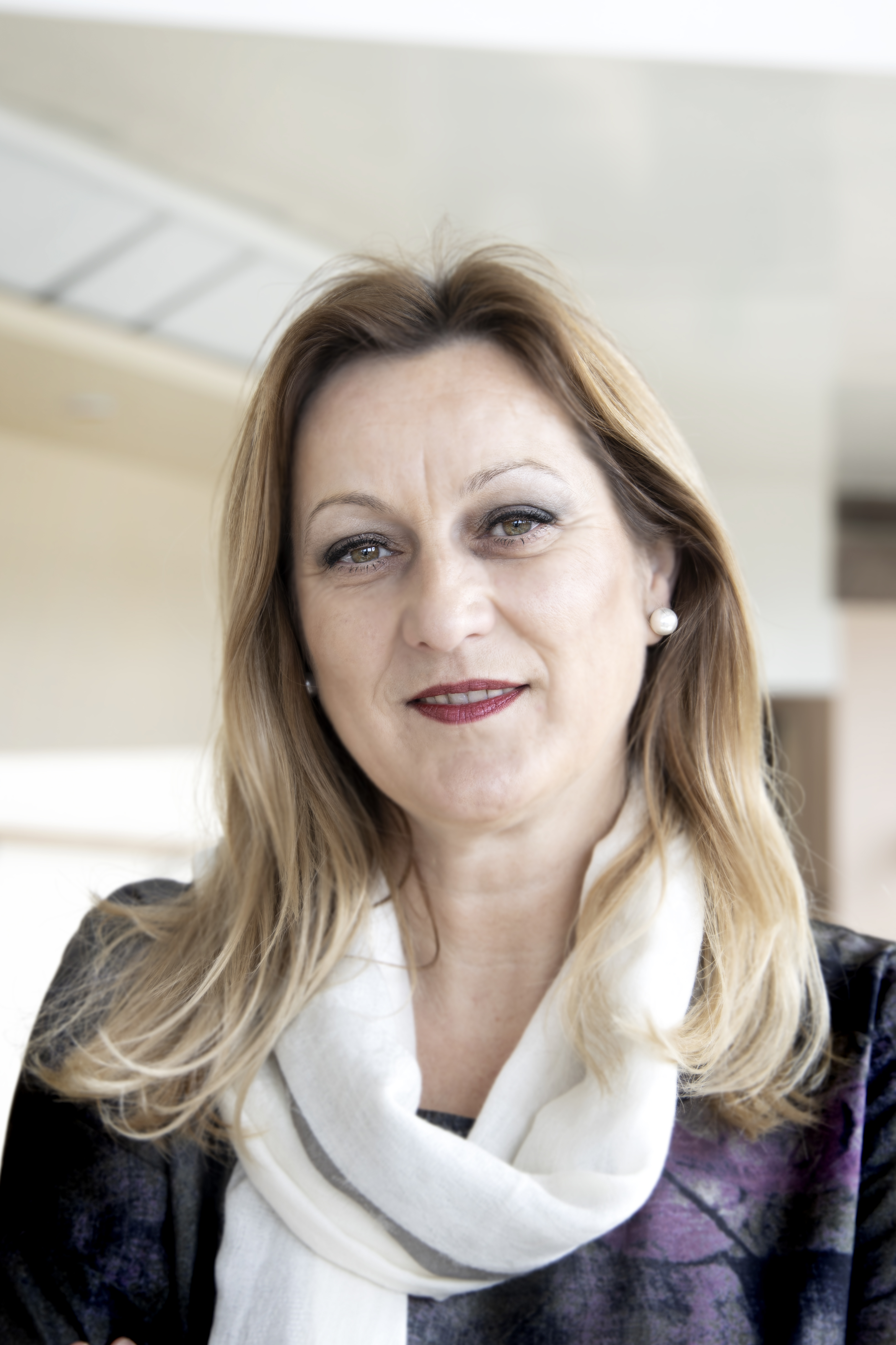
- Mizimovic in March 2019

Member of the Riksdag
- In office 22 January 2019 – 7 May 2019
- Preceded by: Laila Naraghi
- Constituency: Kalmar County
- In office 11 November 2019 – 14 February 2020
- Preceded by: Laila Naraghi
- Constituency: Kalmar County
- In office 8 September 2020 – 1 December 2020
- Preceded by: Tomas Kronståhl

Personal details
- Born: 14 May 1973 (age 53) Bosnia and Herzegovina, Yugoslavia
- Party: Swedish Social Democratic Party

Nermina Mizimovic (born 14 May 1973) is a Swedish politician from the Swedish Social Democratic Party. In 2019, she was the acting deputy for Laila Naraghi and in 2020 she was the acting deputy for Tomas Kronståhl 8 September − 1 December 2020 in the Riksdag. She hails from Hultsfred and represented the Kalmar County constituency. She was a municipal councillor in Hultsfred until 2020.

== See also ==
- List of members of the Riksdag, 2018–2022
