= Aphram Melki =

Swedish politician (born 1959)

Member of the Riksdag
- In office 1 October 2021 – 26 September 2022
- Constituency: Stockholm County

Personal details
- Born: 1959 (age 66–67)
- Party: Centre Party

Aphram Melki (born 1959) is a Swedish politician. From October 2021 to September 2022, he served as Member of the Riksdag representing the constituency of Stockholm County. He became a member after Per Lodenius resigned.
