= Sjöblom =

Sjöblom is a Swedish surname, from a compound of sjö ("lake; sea") and blomma ("flower"). Notable people with the surname include:

- Axel Sjöblom (1882–1951), Swedish gymnast
- Inga-Lill Sjöblom (born 1959), Swedish politician
- Caroline Sjöblom (born 1989), Finnish and Swedish professional soccer player and coach
- Marianne Sjöblom (1933–2014), Finnish fencer
- Nils Sjöblom (1910–1993), Finnish fencer
- Ruut Sjöblom (born 1976), Finnish politician
- Titti Sjöblom (born 1949), Swedish singer
- Ulla Sjöblom (1927–1989), Swedish film actress
- Brett Sjoblom American dancer for Nashville Ballet,
