= Christian Karlsson =

Christian Karlsson or Christian Carlsson may refer to:

- Christian Karlsson (DJ) (born 1975), member of Bloodshy & Avant
- Christian Karlsson (footballer) (born 1969), Swedish former footballer

== See also ==
- Christian Carlsson (politician) (born 1987), Swedish politician
