= Amanda Palmstierna =

Swedish politician (born 1977)

Member of the Riksdag
- In office 1 October 2019 – 26 September 2022
- Constituency: Stockholm County

Personal details
- Born: 1977 (age 48–49)
- Party: Green Party

Amanda Palmstierna (born 1977) is a Swedish politician. From October 2019 to September 2022, she served as Member of the Riksdag representing the constituency of Stockholm County. She became a member after Gustav Fridolin resigned.
