= Martin Marmgren =

Swedish politician (born 1975)

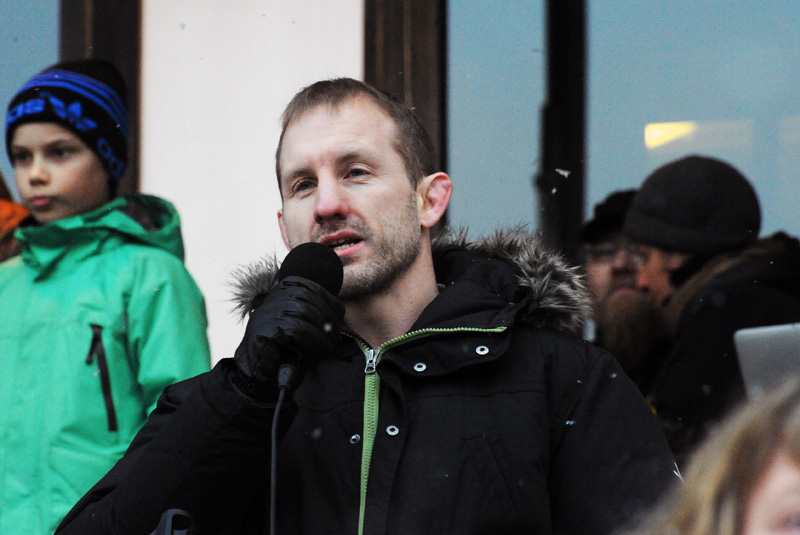

Member of the Riksdag
- In office 11 January 2022 – 26 September 2022
- Constituency: Stockholm County

Personal details
- Born: 1975 (age 50–51)
- Party: Green Party

Martin Marmgren (born 1975) is a Swedish politician. In 2022, he served as Member of the Riksdag representing the constituency of Stockholm County. He became a member after Karolina Skog left.
