= Markus Selin (politician) =

Swedish politician (born 1978)

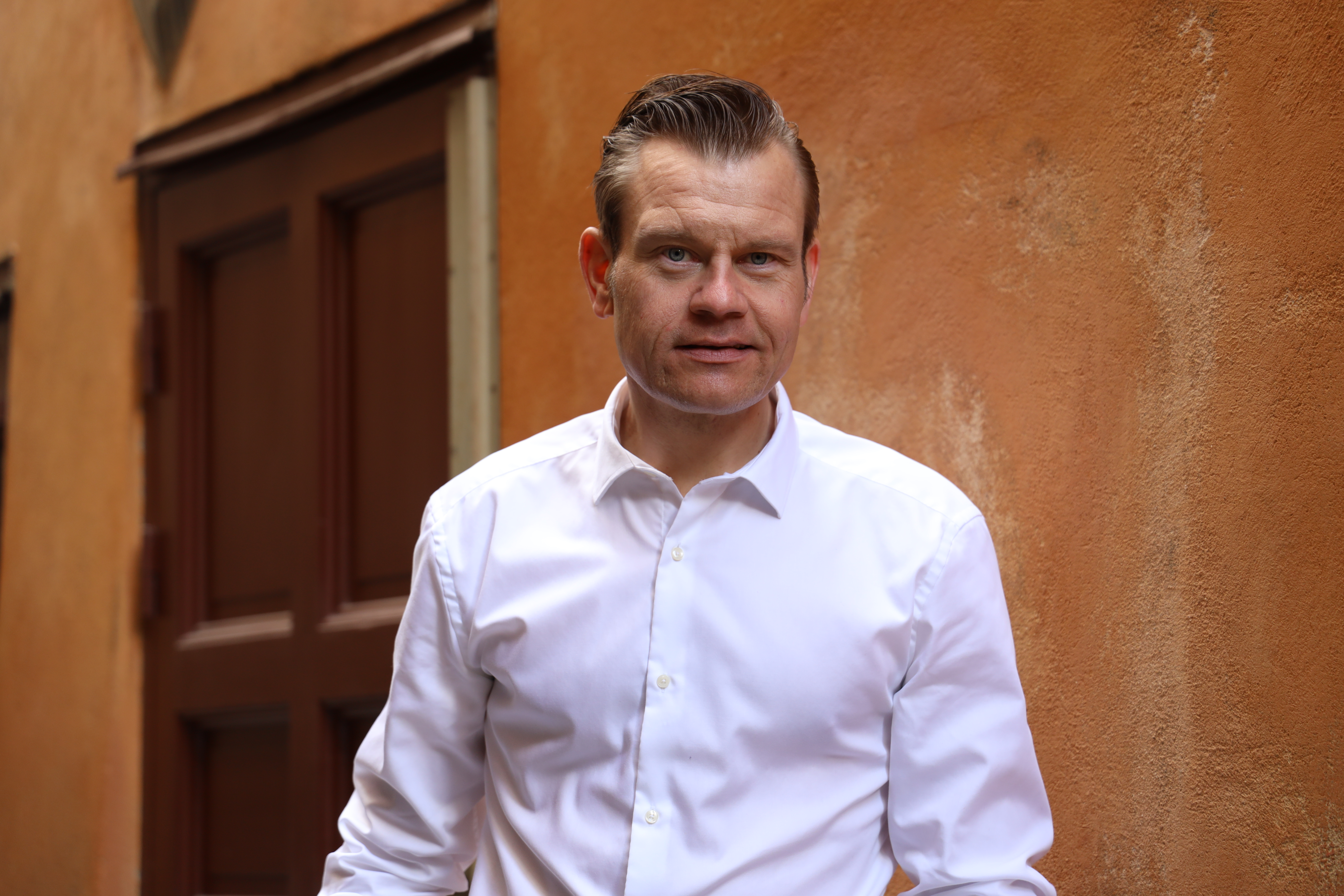
- Selin in 2022

Member of the Riksdag
- Incumbent
- Assumed office 26 September 2022
- Constituency: Stockholm County

Personal details
- Born: Markus Samuel Selin; 1978 (age 47–48)
- Party: Social Democratic Party

Markus Samuel Selin (born 1978) is a Swedish politician and member of the Riksdag, the national legislature. A member of the Social Democratic Party, he has represented Stockholm County since September 2022. He had previously been a substitute member of the Riksdag five times: September 2018 to January 2019 (for Ibrahim Baylan); January 2019 (for Alexandra Völker); February 2019 to July 2020 (for Ibrahim Baylan); August 2020 to June 2022 (for Mikael Damberg); and June 2022 to September 2022 (for Magdalena Andersson).

Selin is the son of metalworker Timo Selin and janitor Anja Selin (née Madetoja). He is a Finnish speaker.
