= Jasmin Farid =

Swedish politician (born 1992)

Jasmin Farid S

Member of the Swedish Parliament for Stockholm
- Incumbent
- Assumed office 23 March 2022
- Preceded by: Magdalena Schröder

Personal details
- Born: 10 February 1992 (age 34)
- Party: Moderate Party
- Profession: Politician

Jasmin Farid (born 10 February 1992) is a Swedish Moderate Party politician who has been a Member of the Riksdag since 2022.

== See also ==
- List of members of the Riksdag, 2018–2022
