= Dag Larsson =

Swedish politician (born 1960)

Member of the Riksdag
- In office 24 September 2018 – 7 June 2022
- Succeeded by: Elsemarie Bjellqvist
- Constituency: Stockholm Municipality

Personal details
- Born: Dag Olov Larsson; 1960 (age 65–66)
- Party: Social Democratic Party
- Education: Stockholm Institute of Education

Dag Olov Larsson (born 1960) is a Swedish politician and former member of the Riksdag, the national legislature. A member of the Social Democratic Party, he represented Stockholm Municipality between September 2018 and June 2022.

Larsson is the son of engineer Bengt Andersson and the behavioural scientist Annmarie Larsson. He studied at the Stockholm Institute of Education.

In January 2022, a police investigation into a Thai massage parlor in Östermalm illicitly functioning as a brothel found Instagram messages dating from December 2021 between a sex worker at the brothel and Larsson. Larsson claimed his account had been compromised. Despite not being suspected of a crime, Larsson resigned from the Riksdag in June 2022 after Aftonbladet broke the news.
