= Teresa Carvalho =

Swedish politician (born 1984)

- Carvalho in 2022

Member of the Riksdag
- Incumbent
- Assumed office 29 September 2014
- Constituency: Östergötland County

Personal details
- Born: 22 August 1984 (age 42) Kvillinge, Östergötland County, Sweden
- Party: Social Democrats

Teresa Kristina Carvalho (born 22 August 1984) is a Swedish politician. Her father is Portuguese and her mother is Swedish.

Since September 2014, she serves as a Member of the Riksdag representing the constituency of Östergötland County. She was also elected as a Member of the Riksdag in September 2022. In October 2024, she was appointed the new justice policy spokesperson of the Social Democrats, succeeding Ardalan Shekarabi.
