= Kadir Kasirga =

Swedish politician (born 1975)

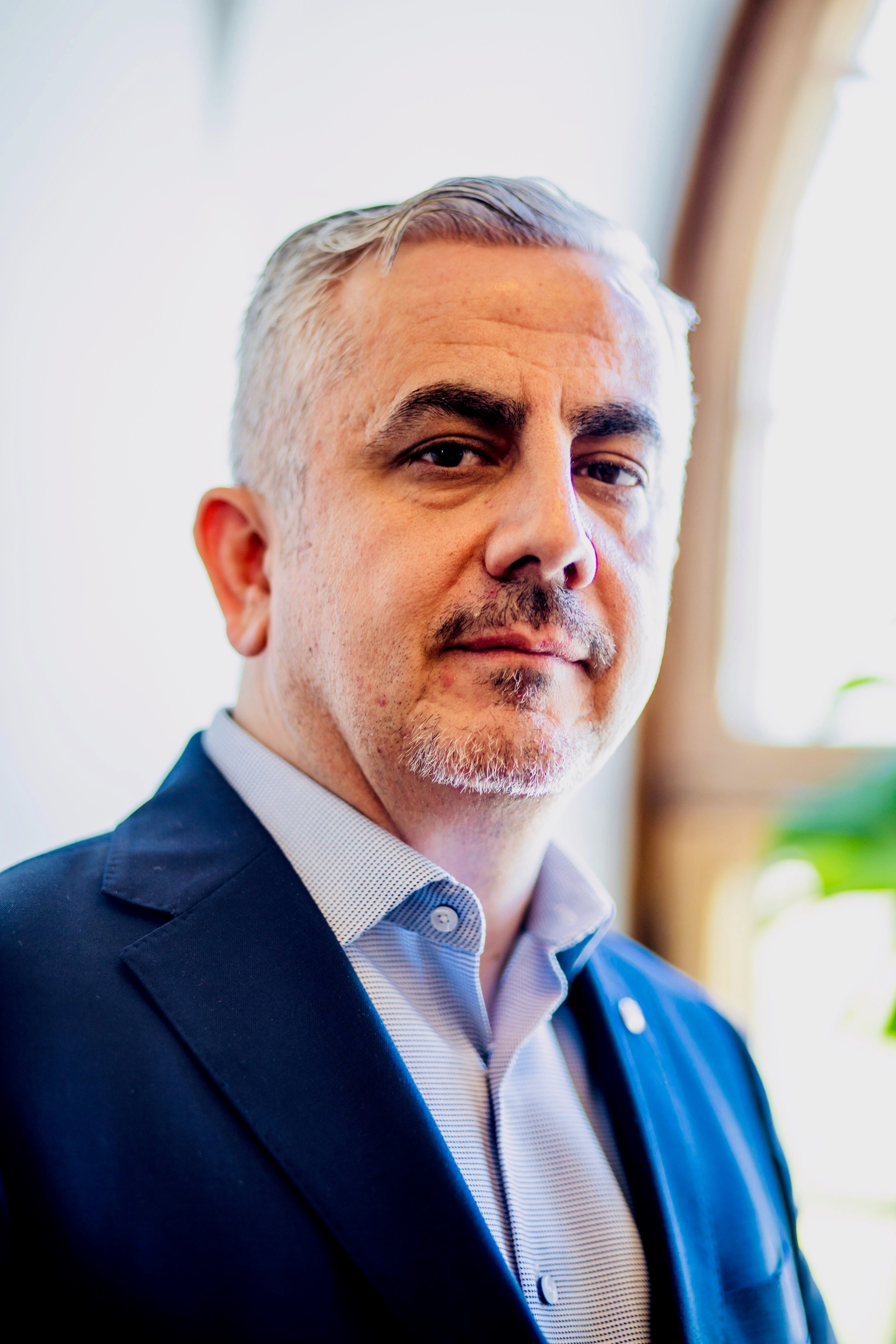
- Kasirga in 2022

Member of the Riksdag
- Incumbent
- Assumed office 26 September 2022
- Constituency: Stockholm Municipality

Member of the Riksdag
- In office 24 September 2018 – 8 March 2020
- Constituency: Stockholm Municipality

Personal details
- Born: 1975 (age 50–51)
- Party: Social Democrats

Kadir Kasirga (born 1975) is a Swedish politician of Kurdish descent. He served as Member of the Riksdag representing the constituency of Stockholm Municipality from 24 September 2018 to 8 March 2020. Sultan Kayhan took his place in the Riksdag after Kasirga resigned. He became a member of the Riksdag again in 2022. He volunteered as an OECD observer to the Turkish elections in May 2023, but he was denied entry to Turkey on grounds he had visited the Kurdish-led Syrian Democratic Forces (SDF) in the past.
