= Sultan Kayhan =

Swedish politician (born 1988)

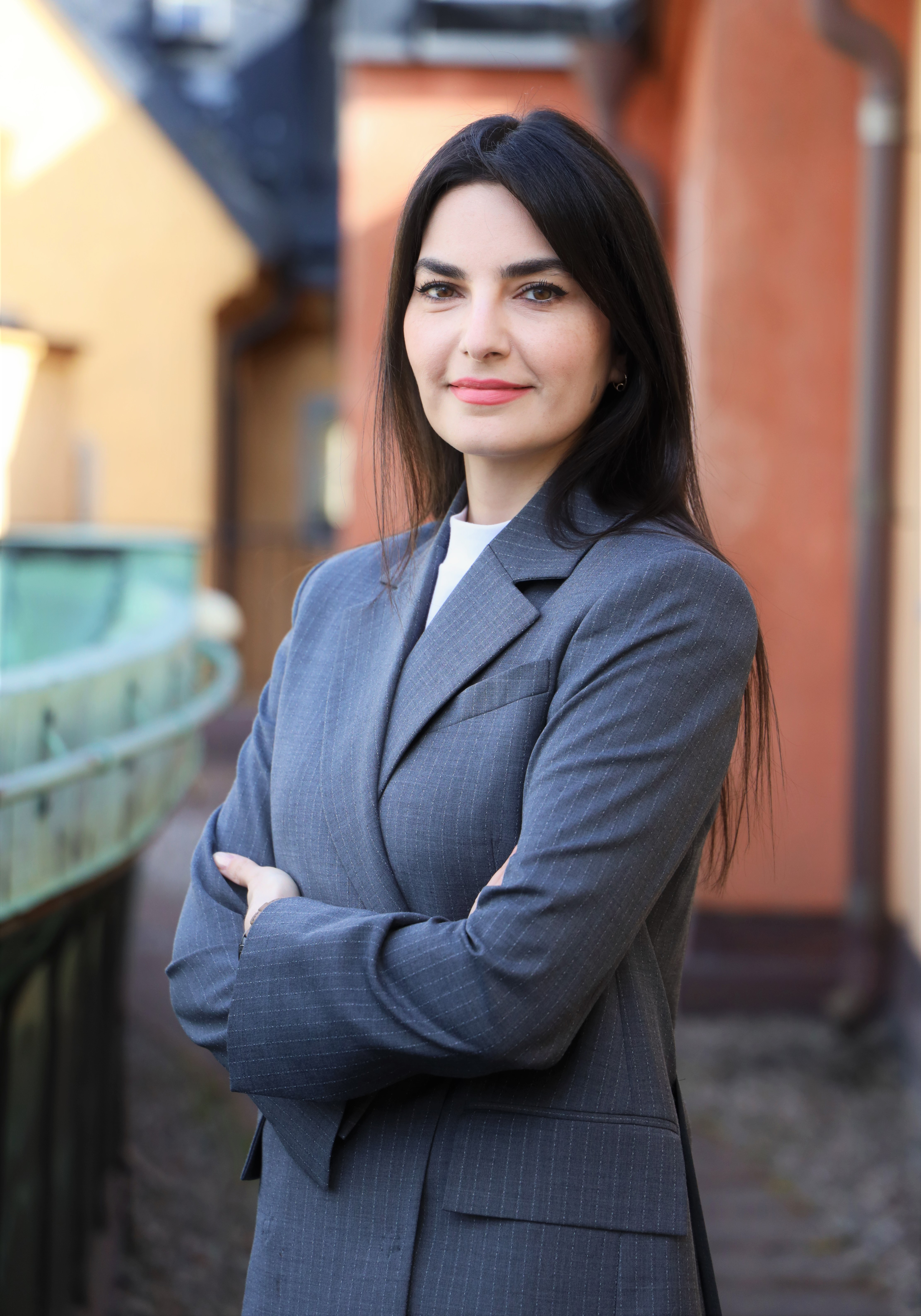

Former member of the Riksdag
- In office 9 March 2020 – 18 October 2022
- Constituency: Stockholm Municipality

Personal details
- Born: 1988 (age 37–38)
- Party: Social Democrats

Sultan Kayhan (born 1988) was a Swedish politician. Since March 2020, she served as Member of the Riksdag representing the constituency of Stockholm Municipality. She became a member after Kadir Kasirga resigned.
