= Lars Jilmstad =

Swedish politician (born 1946)

Member of the Riksdag
- In office 1 January 2020 – 26 September 2022
- Constituency: Stockholm Municipality

Personal details
- Born: 1946 (age 79–80)
- Party: Moderate

Lars Jilmstad (born 1946) is a Swedish politician. From January 2020 to September 2022, he served as Member of the Riksdag representing the constituency of Stockholm Municipality. He became a member after Beatrice Ask resigned. From 26 August 2019 to 31 December 2019, he served as substitute in the Riksdag for Jessica Rosencrantz.
