= Lorentz Tovatt =

Swedish politician (born 1989)

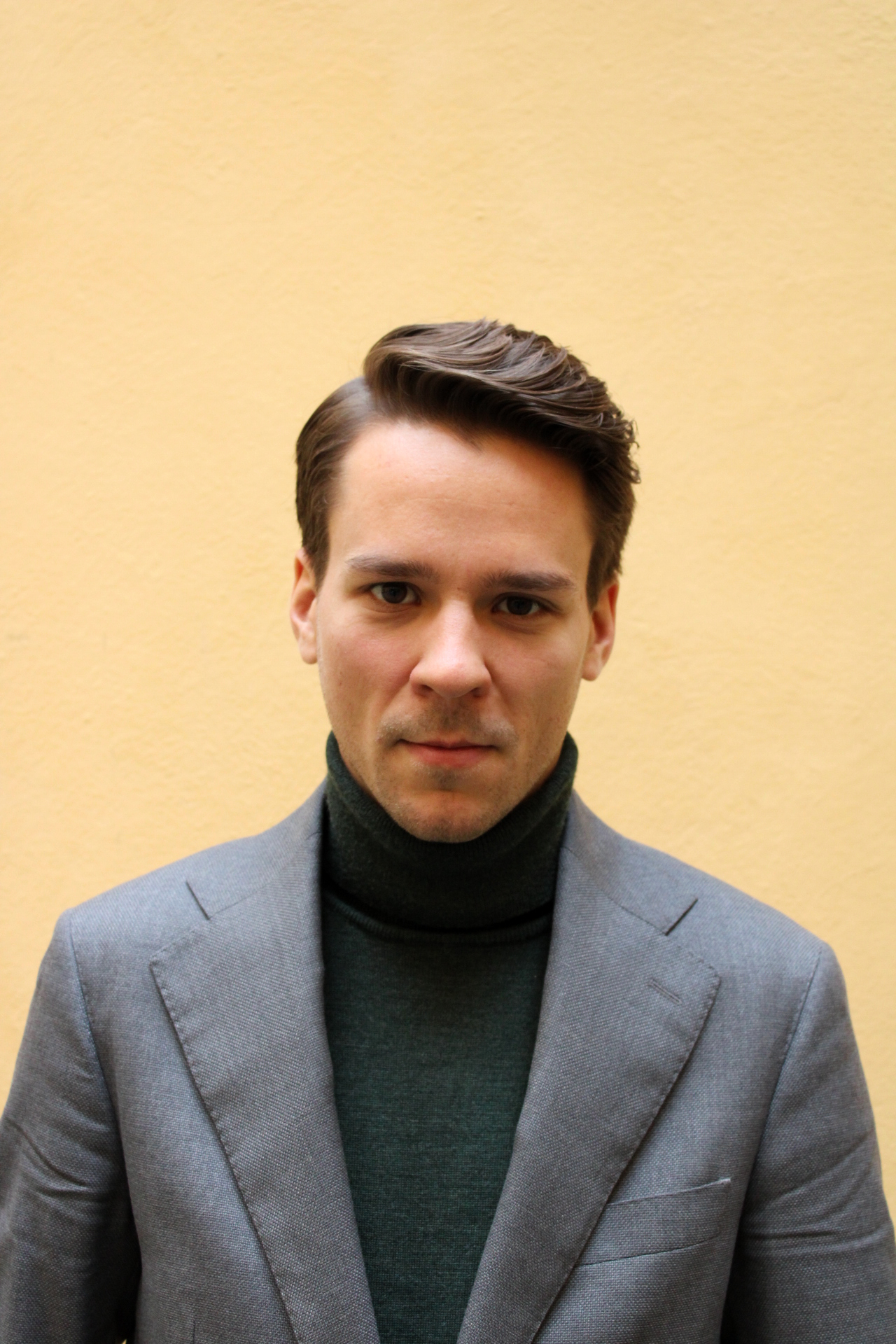
- Tovatt in 2020

Member of the Riksdag
- In office 1 February 2021 – 26 September 2022
- Constituency: Stockholm Municipality

Personal details
- Born: 1989 (age 36–37)
- Party: Green Party

Lorentz Tovatt (born 1989) is a Swedish politician. From February 2021 to September 2022, he served as Member of the Riksdag representing the constituency of Stockholm Municipality.
