= Ulrika Heindorff =

Swedish politician (born 1983)

Member of the Riksdag
- In office 2018–2025
- Constituency: Skåne County Western

Personal details
- Born: 9 October 1983 (age 42) Vetlanda Parish, Jönköping County
- Party: Moderate Party
- Education: Lund University

Ulrika Linnea Heindorff (born 9 October 1983) is a Swedish politician from the Moderate Party who was elected a member of parliament for Skåne County Western in 2018 and 2022. In 2025, she left politics.

== See also ==
- List of members of the Riksdag, 2018–2022
- List of members of the Riksdag, 2022–2026
