= Stefan Plath =

Swedish politician (born 1970)

Member of the Riksdag
- Incumbent
- Assumed office 2021
- Constituency: Malmö Municipality

Personal details
- Born: 1970 (age 55–56)
- Party: Sweden Democrats

Stefan Plath (born 1970) is a Swedish politician of the Sweden Democrats party who became a member of the Riksdag in 2021.

He represents the Malmö Municipality and was appointed as a replacement for Sara Gille who was on temporary leave before becoming a full-time member of parliament. Before entering politics he was a systems administrator and then an IT consultant in Sweden and Denmark. He has also served as a municipal councilor for the SD in Malmö. In parliament, he served as a member of the civil liberties and foreign affairs committees.
