= Marta Obminska =

Swedish politician

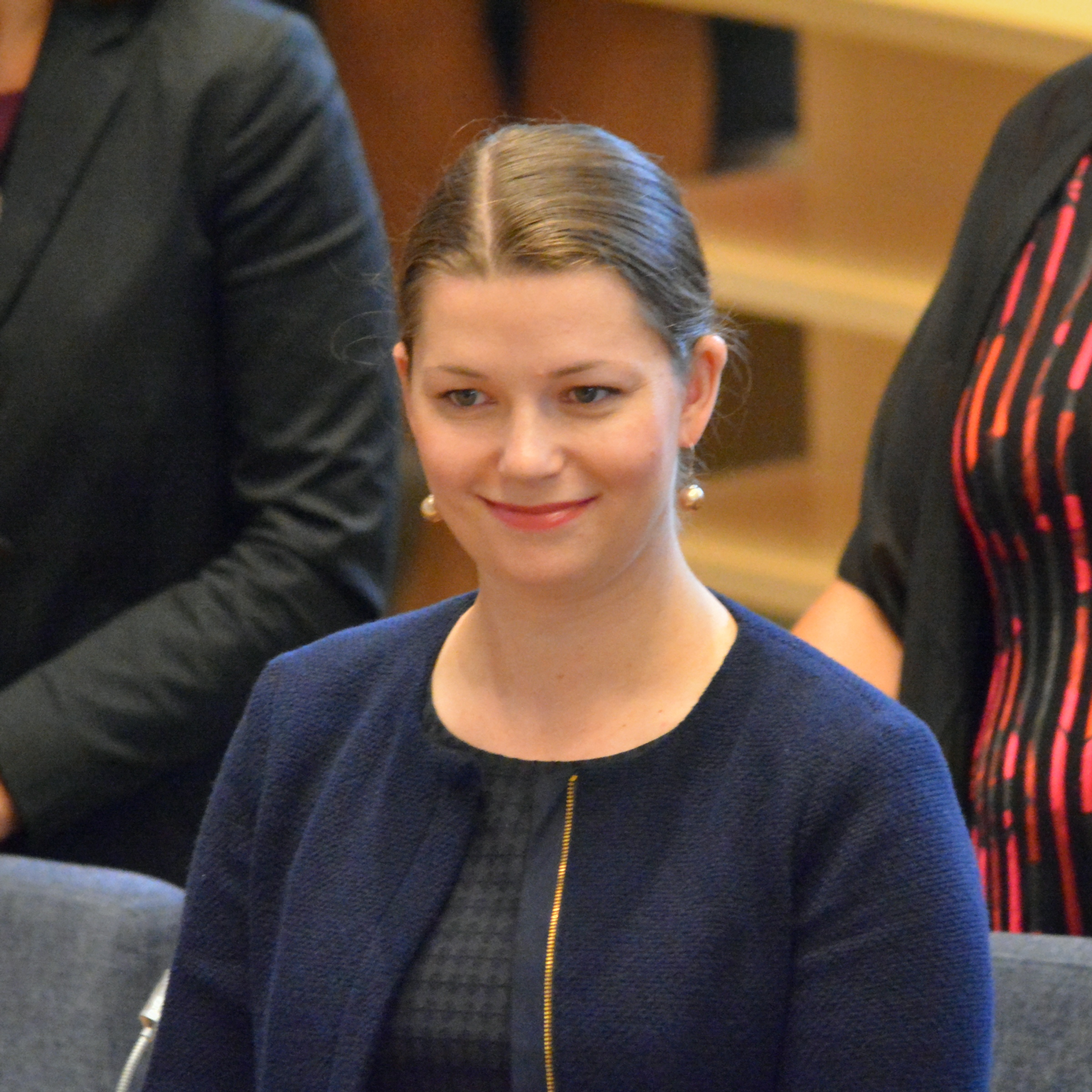

Member of the Riksdagen
- In office 2010 – 26 September 2022

Personal details
- Born: Marta Amalia Obminska; 1 August 1979 (age 45)
- Political party: Moderate Party

Marta Amalia Obminska (born 1 August 1979) is a Swedish politician for the Moderate Party and an MP in the Riksdagen between 2010 and 2014, and again from 2015 to 2022. She was elected into the Riksdagen from Uppsala constituency at place 6.

Obminska was born in Poland.
