= Christina Nilsson (politician) =

Swedish politician (born 1956)

Christina Nilsson SD

Member of the Swedish Parliament for Östergötland County
- In office 20 October 2021 – 24 November 2021
- Preceded by: Markus Wiechel

Personal details
- Born: 1956 (age 69–70)
- Party: Sweden Democrats
- Profession: Politician

Christina Nilsson (born 1956) is a Swedish politician who was a Member of the Riksdag for a month in late 2021.

== See also ==
- List of members of the Riksdag, 2018–2022
