= Katarina Olofsson =

Swedish politician (born 1943)

Member of the Riksdag
- Incumbent
- Assumed office 2018
- Constituency: Stockholm County

Personal details
- Born: 1943 (age 82–83)
- Party: Sweden Democrats

Katarina Olofsson (born 1943) is a Swedish politician and member of the Riksdag for the Sweden Democrats party. She represents the constituency of Stockholm County. She is also the chairwoman of the SD's branch in Upplands-Bro Municipality. Olofsson is a retired civil engineer and described the so-called December Agreement following the 2014 Swedish government crisis as the factor that prompted her to join the Sweden Democrats and become politically active.
