= Inga-Lill Sjöblom =

Swedish politician (born 1959)

Member of the Riksdag
- Incumbent
- Assumed office 26 September 2022
- Constituency: Uppsala County

Personal details
- Born: Inga-Lill Kristina Sjöblom; 1959 (age 66–67)
- Party: Social Democratic Party

Inga-Lill Kristina Sjöblom (born 1959) is a Swedish politician and member of the Riksdag, the national legislature. A member of the Social Democratic Party, she has represented Uppsala County since September 2022. She had previously been a substitute member of the Riksdag twice: October 2019 to May 2020 (for Sanne Lennström); and August 2020 to December 2020 (for Ardalan Shekarabi).

Sjöblom is the daughter of metalworker and miller Karl-Gustaf Sjöblom.
