= Fredrik Schulte =

Swedish politician (born 1981)

Fredrik Schulte (born 6 December 1981), is a Swedish former politician and member of the Moderate Party. He was member of the Riksdag from 2006 to 2018, with a brief interruption in 2014, and from 2019 to 2022.
