= Azadeh Rojhan Gustafsson =

Swedish politician (born 1986)

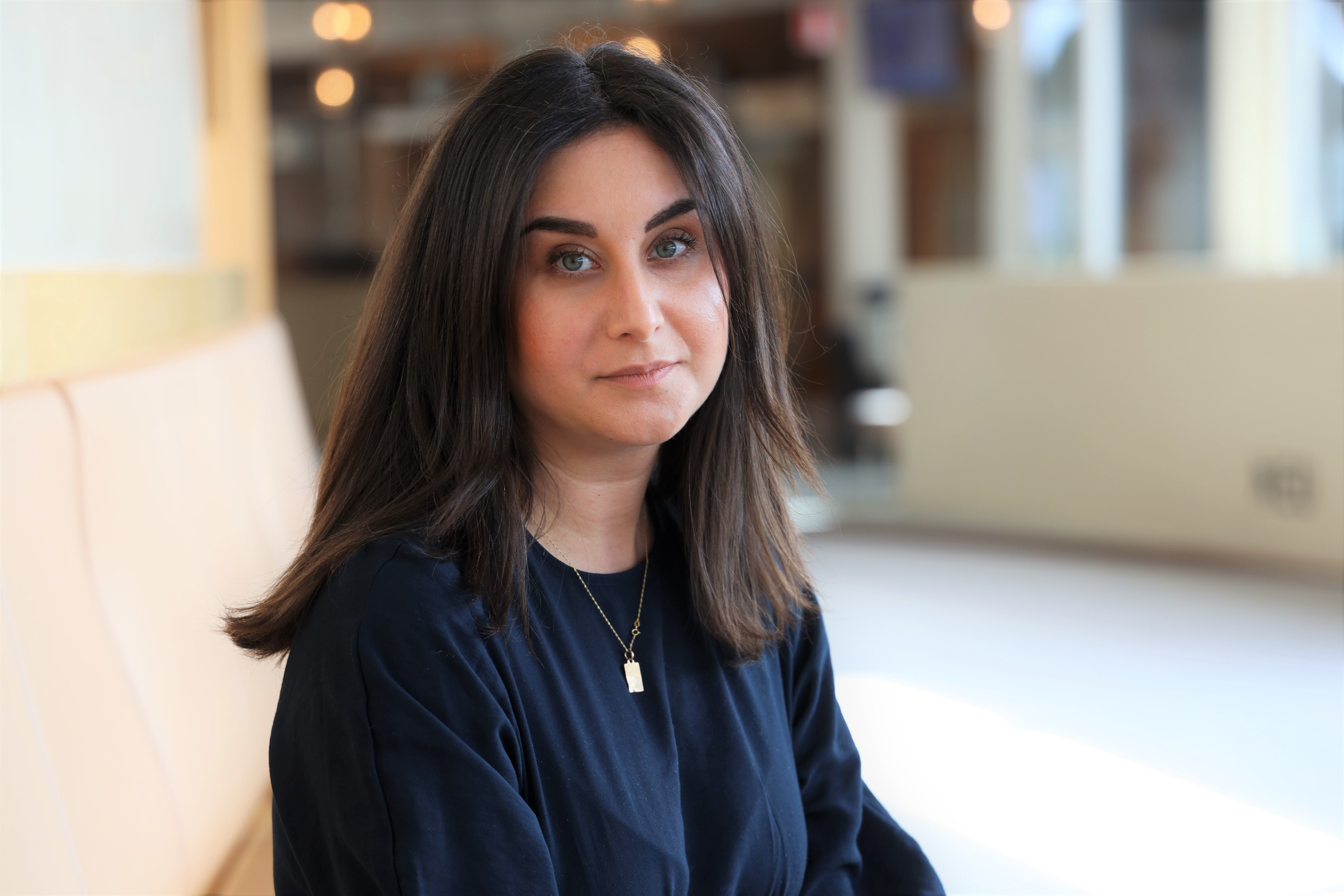

Azadeh Rojhan Gustafsson (born 1986) is an Iranian-Swedish politician who serves as a member of the Swedish parliament.

== Early life and education ==
Rojhan Gustafsson was born in 1986 in Iran. at the age of five, she with her mother, father and brother immigrated and grew up in Sweden.

== Political career ==
In 2006, Rojhan Gustafsson joined the Swedish Social Democratic Party for the first time and then in 2014 was elected to parliament as a member.

In addition to her committee assignments, Rojhan Gustafsson has been a member of the Swedish delegation to the Parliamentary Assembly of the Council of Europe (PACE) since 2016. In the Assembly, she serves on the Committee on the Honouring of Obligations and Commitments by Member States of the Council of Europe (since 2017); the Committee on Legal Affairs and Human Rights (since 2016); the Sub-Committee on Media and Information Society (since 2019); and the Sub-Committee on Human Rights (2016–2021).
