= Karolina Skog =

Swedish politician (born 1976)

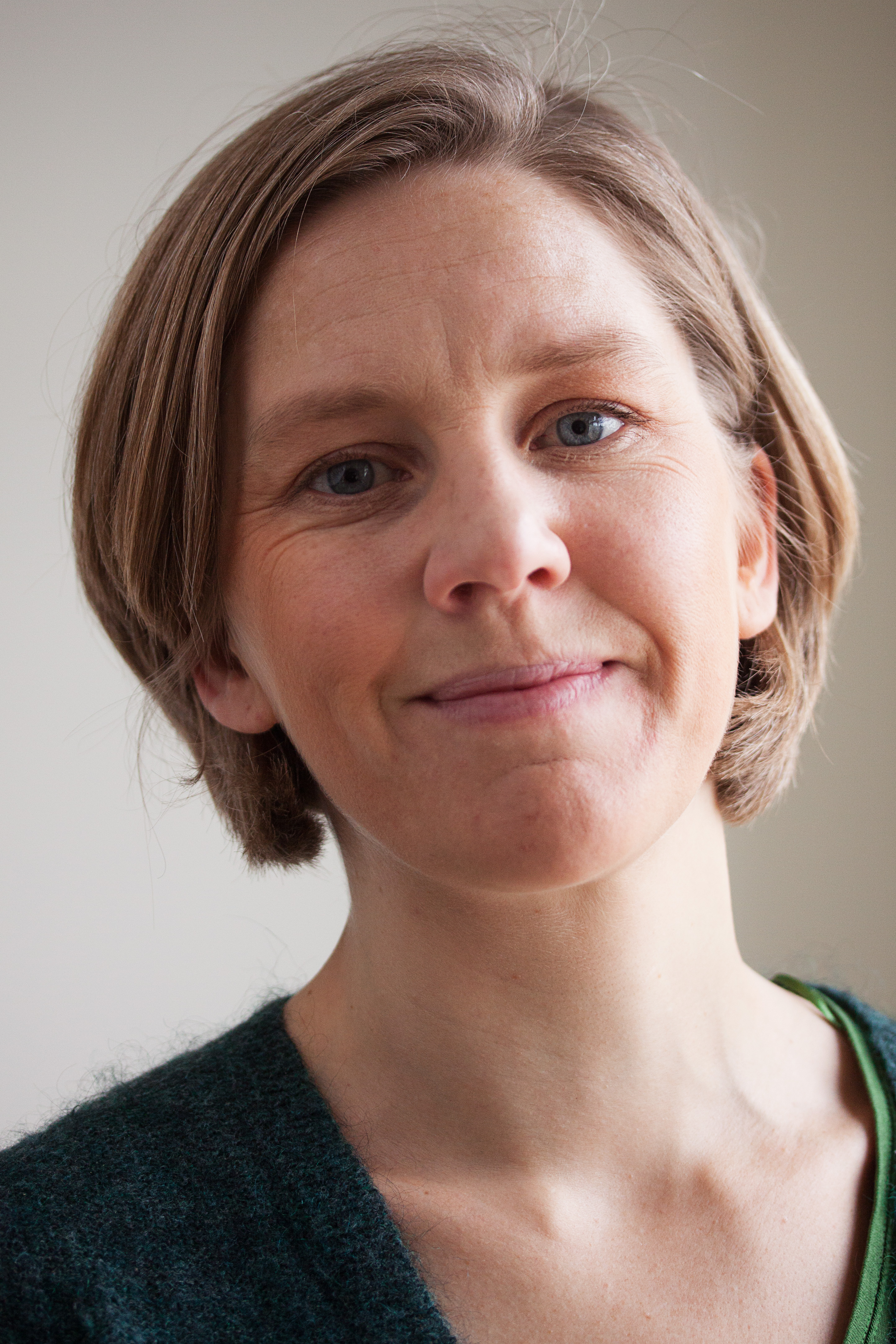

Member of the Riksdag
- In office 24 September 2018 – 10 January 2022
- Succeeded by: Martin Marmgren
- Constituency: Stockholm County

Minister for the Environment
- In office 25 May 2016 – 21 January 2019
- Monarch: Carl XVI Gustaf
- Prime Minister: Stefan Löfven
- Preceded by: Åsa Romson
- Succeeded by: Isabella Lövin

Personal details
- Born: Karolina Maria Algotsson; 30 March 1976 (age 50) Åhus, Sweden
- Party: Green Party
- Education: Lund University
- Profession: Human ecologist

Karolina Maria Skog (née Algotsson; on 30 March 1976) is a Swedish politician who served as Minister for the Environment from 25 May 2016 to 21 January 2019. She is a member of the Green Party and served as City Commissioner in Malmö Municipality from 2010 until being appointed cabinet minister.

Political offices
Preceded by Åsa Romson	Minister for the Environment; 2016–2019	Succeeded by Isabella Lövin
