= Monika Lövgren =

Swedish politician

Member of the Riksdag
- Incumbent
- Assumed office 2018
- Succeeded by: Paula Bieler
- Constituency: Uppsala County

Personal details
- Born: 1961 (age 64–65)
- Party: Sweden Democrats

Monika Lövgren is a Swedish politician and member of the Riksdag for the Sweden Democrats party. She was appointed to parliament, succeeding Paula Bieler who had resigned her seat, and took over Bieler's role as the SD's spokeswoman on equality, gender and LGBT issues.
