= Jonas Eriksson (politician) =

Swedish politician (born 1967)

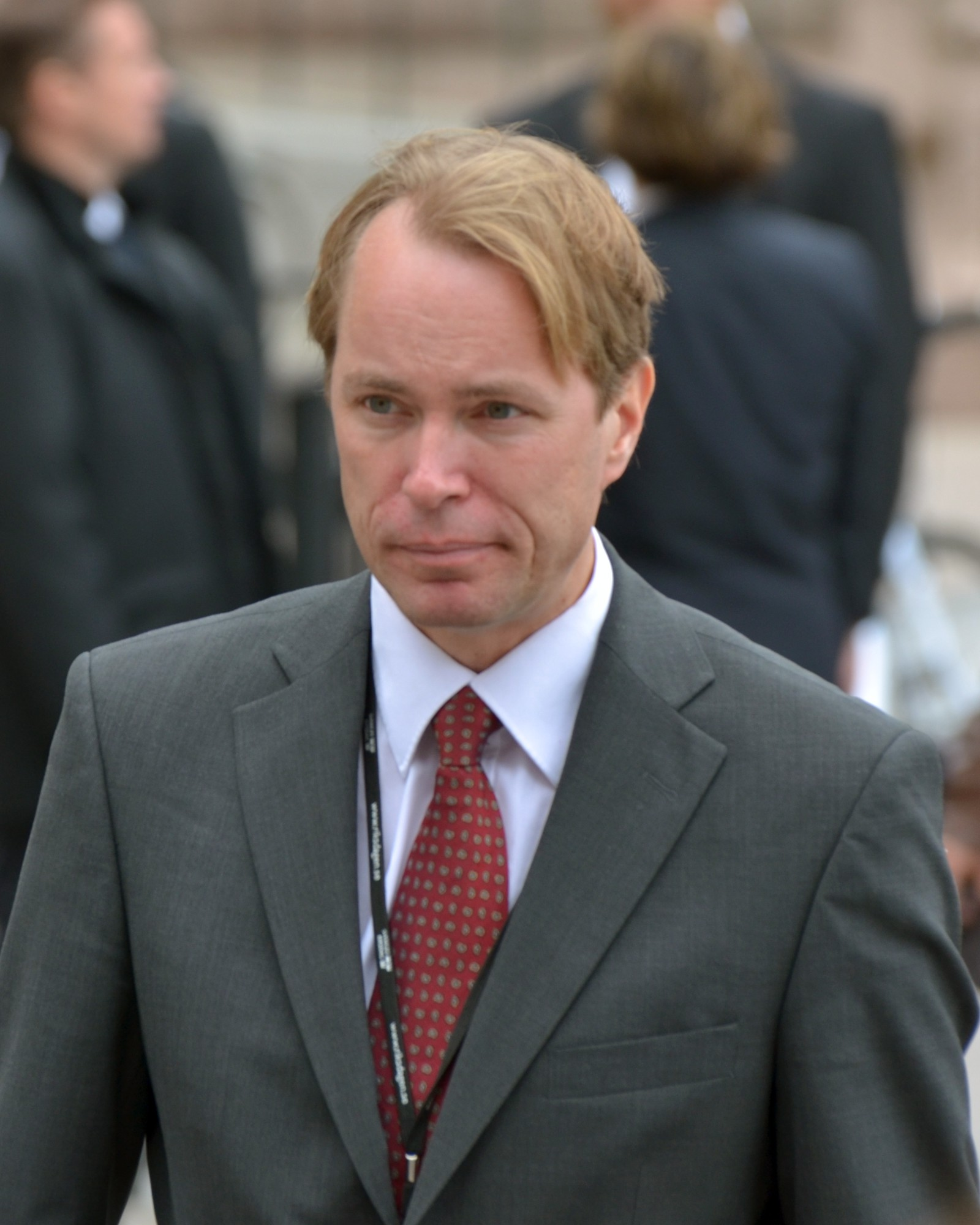
- Eriksson in September 2012

Member of the Riksdag
- In office 4 October 2010 – 3 November 2019
- Succeeded by: Camilla Hansén
- Constituency: Örebro County

Personal details
- Born: Mats Jonas Eriksson; 1967 (age 58–59)
- Party: Green Party

Mats Jonas Eriksson (born 1967) is a Swedish politician, teacher and former member of the Riksdag, the national legislature. A member of the Green Party, he represented Örebro County from 4 October 2010 to 3 November 2019.. He was leader of the Green Group in the Riksdag five times: from January 2015 to March 2015; from May 2015 to December 2015; from November 2016 to January 2018; from September 2018 to February 2019; and from July 2019 to November 2019.

Eriksson is the son of businessman Roger Eriksson and nurse Bodil Eriksson (née Danielsson). He was educated in Örebro and has degrees in mathematics, physics and religion; business administration and law; and teaching. He was a teacher in Lindesberg Municipality from 1989 to 1996 and in Örebro Municipality from 1998 to 2007.
