= Christina Nilsson (shipwreck) =

Schooner that sank in Lake Michigan

- U.S. National Register of Historic Places
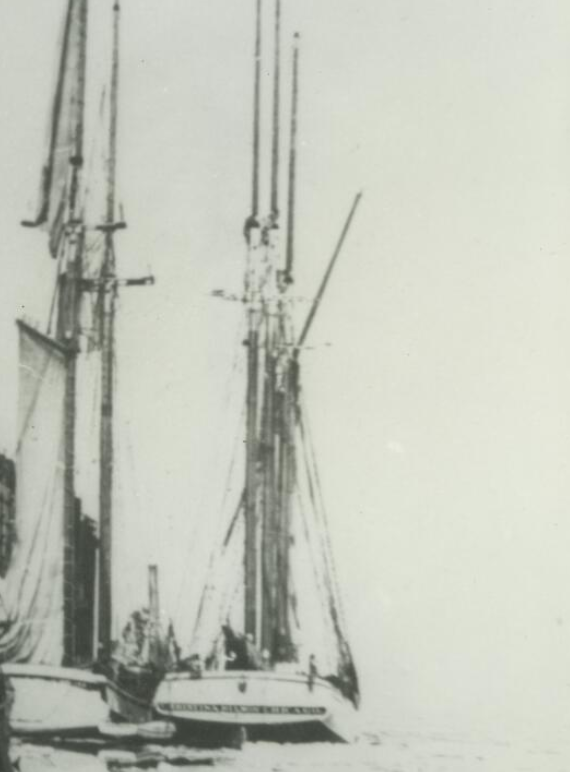
- Christina Nilsson before she sank

- Location within Wisconsin Location within the United States
- Location: Lake Michigan off Baileys Harbor, Wisconsin
- Coordinates: 45°03.267′N 087°05.875′W
- NRHP reference No.: 03000668
- Added to NRHP: July 17, 2003

Christina Nilsson was a schooner that sank in Lake Michigan off Baileys Harbor, Wisconsin, on October 23, 1884. In 2003, a shipwreck site purporting to be that of this ship was added to the National Register of Historic Places. The wreck was subsequently identified as that of the Joseph Cochrane.

== History ==
The ship was built in Manitowoc, Wisconsin, at a cost of $23,000 and was named after Christina Nilsson.

On October 23, 1884, Christina Nilsson cleared Escanaba, Michigan, bound for Chicago, Illinois, with a cargo of pig iron. When a blizzard hit the area that day, her captain attempted to make port at Baileys Harbor, but, while still trying to navigate through the storm, Christina Nilsson struck a reef off Baileys Harbor and foundered. All crew members survived.

The ship's cargo was recovered, but attempts to salvage Christina Nilsson herself were unsuccessful. The wreck site has been investigated by the Wisconsin Historical Society and the Wisconsin Underwater Archaeology Association since 1997.

In June 2025, the Wisconsin Historical Society confirmed the wreck previously identified as Christina Nilsson to be that of a different vessel, the schooner Joseph Cochrane, lost in 1870.
