= Emilia Töyrä =

Swedish politician

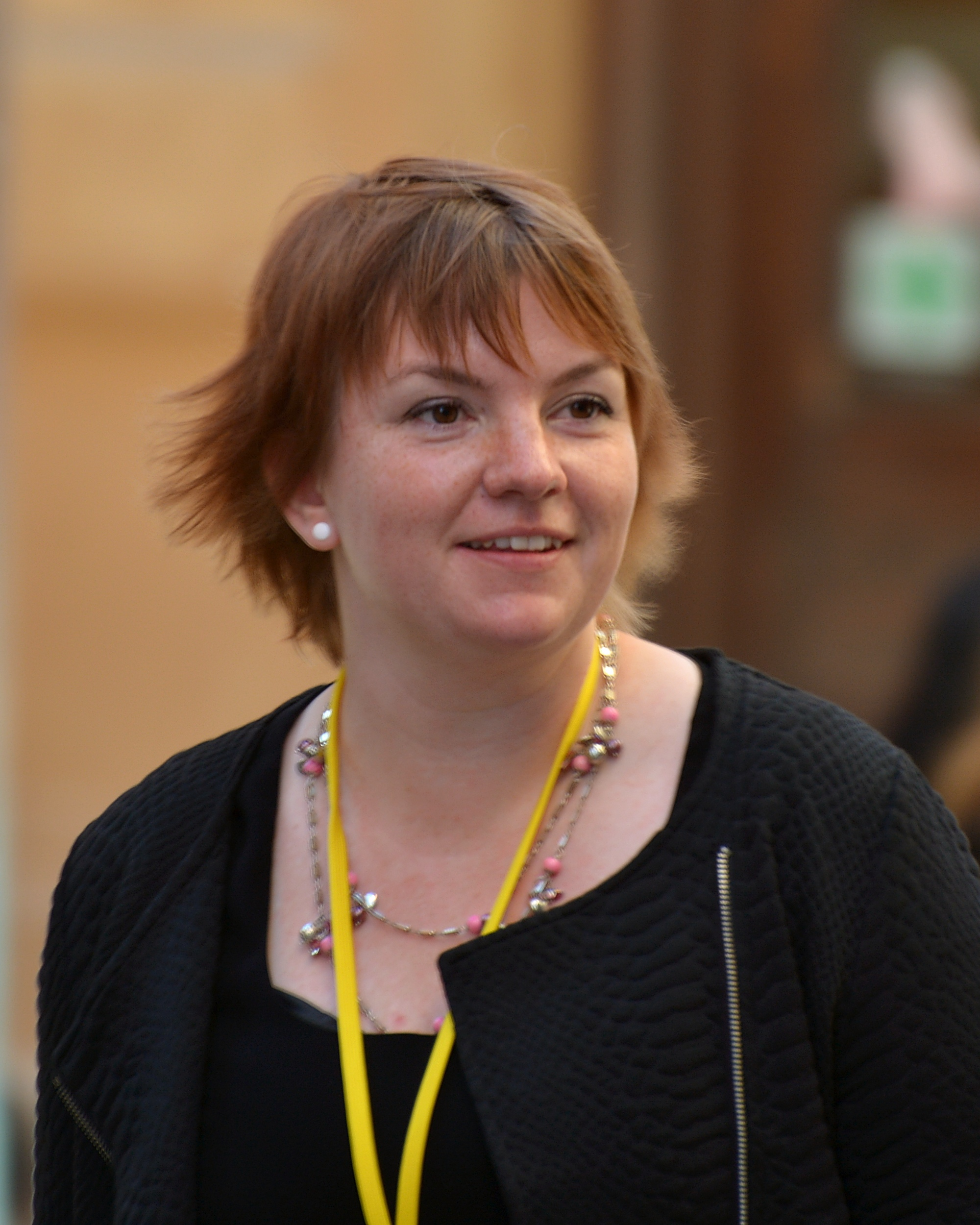
- Emilia Töyrä in september 2014

Member of the Riksdag
- Incumbent
- Assumed office 2014
- Constituency: Norrbottens län

Personal details
- Born: 10 June 1985 (age 40) Jukkasjärvi, Sweden
- Party: Social Democrats

Emilia Töyrä is a Swedish politician currently sitting in the Riksdag with the Social Democrats.
