= Christian Carlsson (politician) =

Swedish politician (born 1987)

Christian Carlsson S

Member of the Swedish Parliament for Stockholm County
- Incumbent
- Assumed office 11 February 2021
- Preceded by: Acko Ankarberg Johansson
- Constituency: Stockholm Municipality (2018)

Personal details
- Born: 29 January 1987 (age 39) Karlstad, Värmland County
- Party: Christian Democrats
- Education: Stockholm University
- Profession: Politician

Christian Carlsson (born 29 January 1987) is a Swedish politician from the Christian Democrats who has been a Member of the Riksdag since 2021, previous serving a short term in 2018. He was elected to a full term in the 2022 election.

== See also ==
- List of members of the Riksdag, 2022–2026
