= Elsemarie Bjellqvist =

Swedish politician (born 1944)

Elsemarie Bjellqvist S
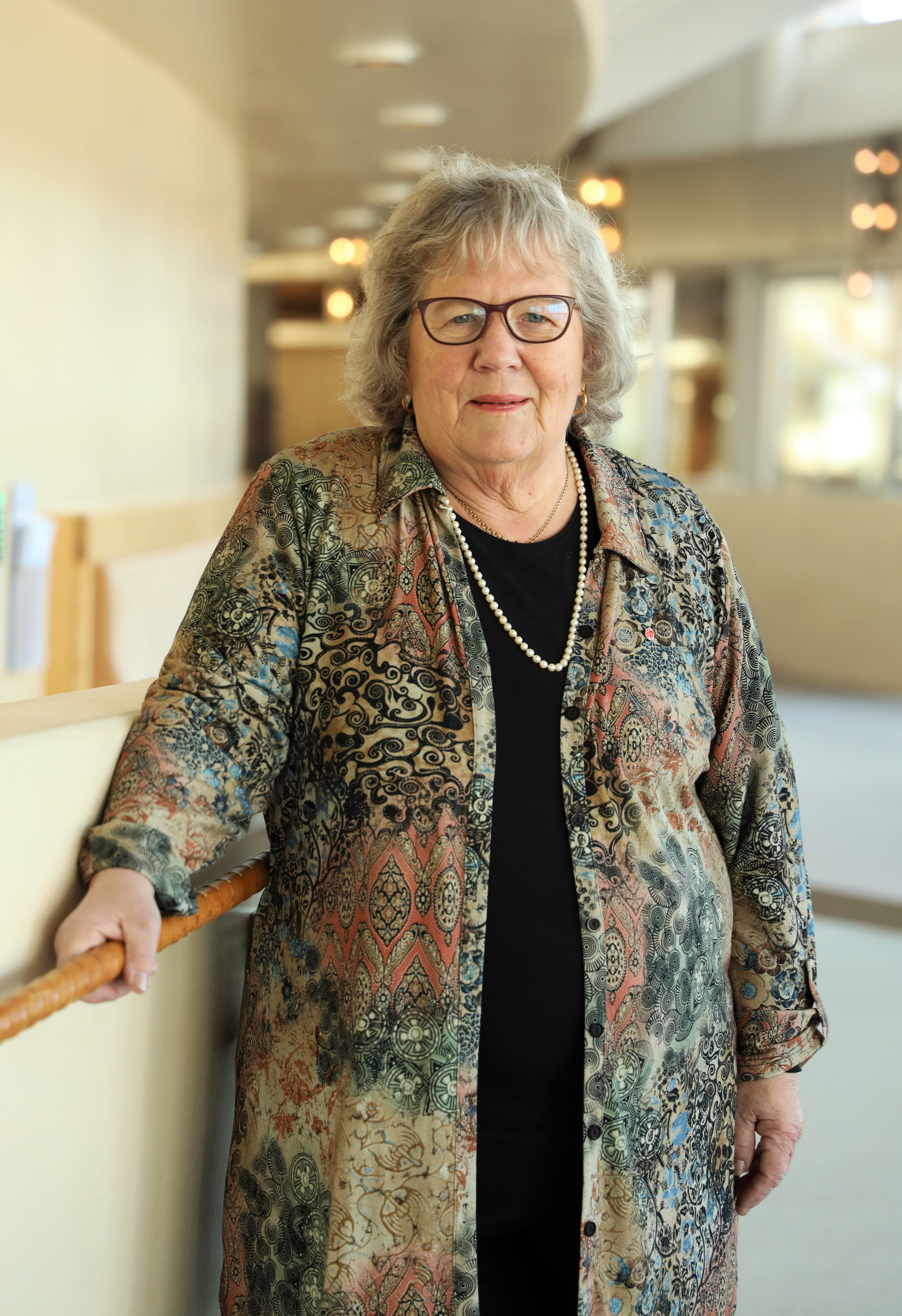
- Bjellqvist in 2022.

Member of the Swedish Parliament for Stockholm
- Incumbent
- Assumed office 30 November 2021
- Preceded by: Anders Ygeman

Personal details
- Born: 4 January 1944 (age 82)
- Party: Swedish Social Democratic Party
- Profession: Politician

Elsemarie Bjellqvist (born 4 January 1944) is a Swedish Social Democratic politician who has been a Member of the Riksdag since 2021.
