= Per Lodenius =

Swedish politician (born 1966)

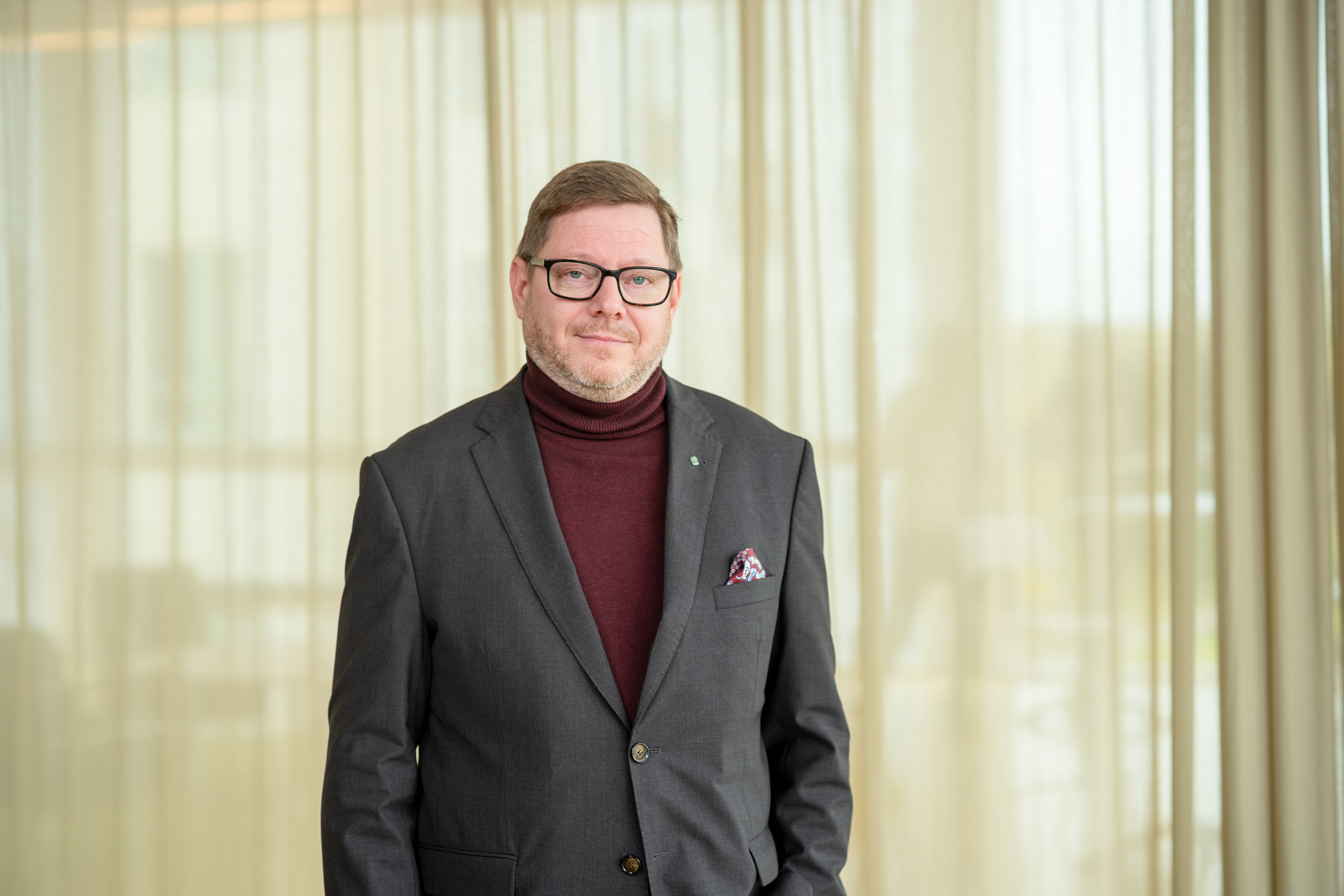
- Per Lodenius in 2019

Personal details
- Born: February 28, 1966 (age 60) Norrtälje

Per Lodenius (born February 28, 1966, in Norrtälje) is a Swedish politician who was an MP for the Centre Party from 2006 to 2021. He is an educated Swedish teacher, and in the early 1990s, he was self-employed as a freelance dance educator. He was elected to the Center Party in Stockholm County constituency in the 2006 election. He was a substitute member of the education committee from 2006 to 2021 and spokesman on special education issues. From 2011 to 2021, Lodenius was an ordinary member of Parliament's Cultural Affairs Committee and the Center Party's spokesperson on cultural issues.

Between 2011 and 2015, Lodenius was the district chairman of the Center Party in Stockholm County. Since 2017, he has been chairman of the Bygdegårdarnas national association.

Lodenius was a member of the Riksdag's sobriety group and Riksdag's disability forum, as well as the Swedish-British Parliamentary Association. Lodenius has also been a member of the municipal council in Norrtälje municipality since the 1994 local elections.
