= Tomas Kronståhl =

Swedish politician (born 1967)

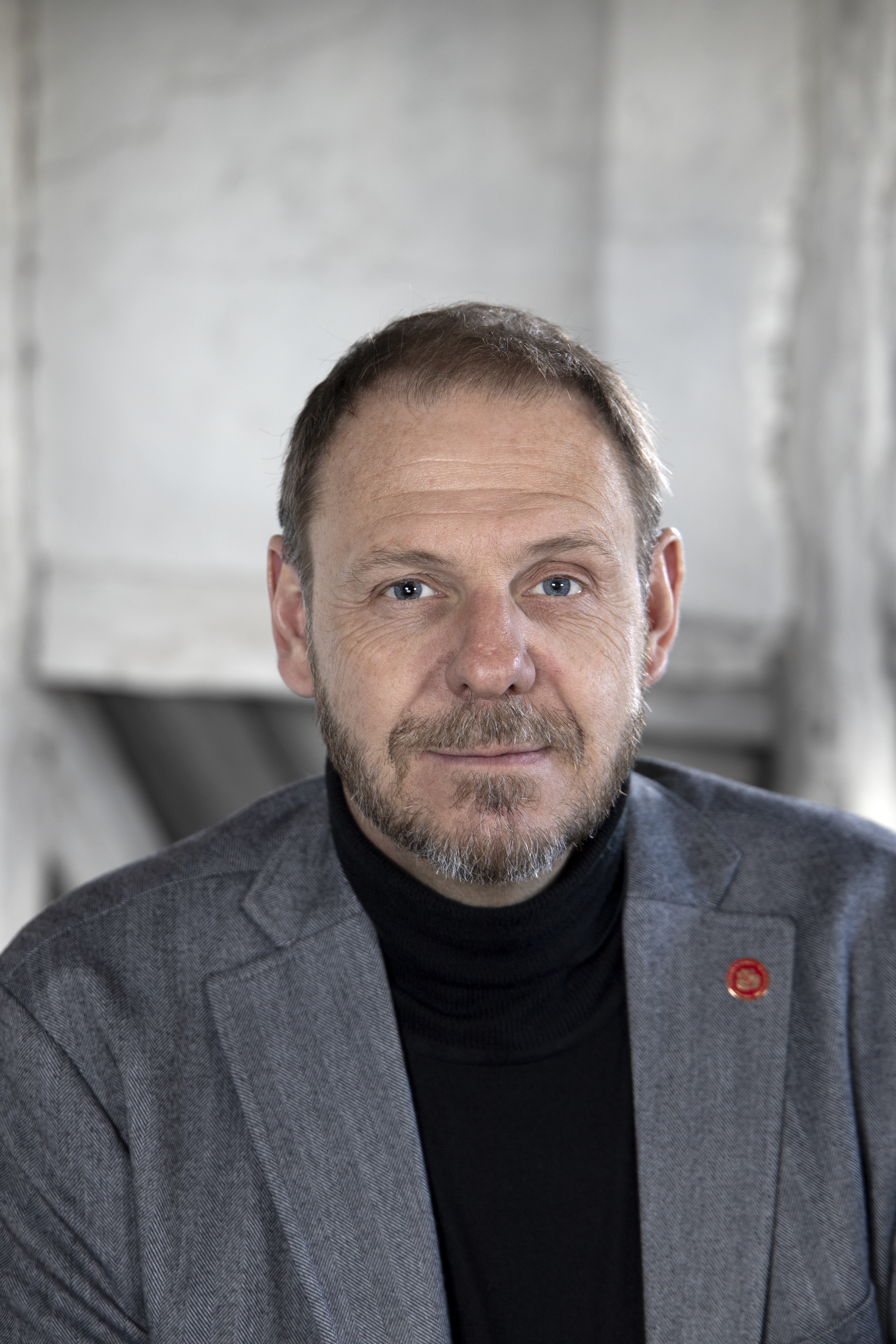
- Kronståhl in March 2019

Member of the Riksdag
- Incumbent
- Assumed office 24 September 2018
- Constituency: Kalmar County

Personal details
- Born: Tomas Carl Olof Kronstål; 1967 (age 58–59)
- Party: Social Democratic Party

Tomas Carl Olof Kronstål (born 1967) is a Swedish politician and member of the Riksdag, the national legislature. A member of the Social Democratic Party, he has represented Kalmar County since September 2018.

Kronstål is the son of property manager Carl Kronståhl and May-Britt Kronståhl (née Oskarsson). He is a painter and has run his own business since 1992. He is also a part-time fireman. He has been a member of the municipal council in Västervik Municipality since 2006.
