= Mathias Tegnér =

Swedish politician (born 1979)

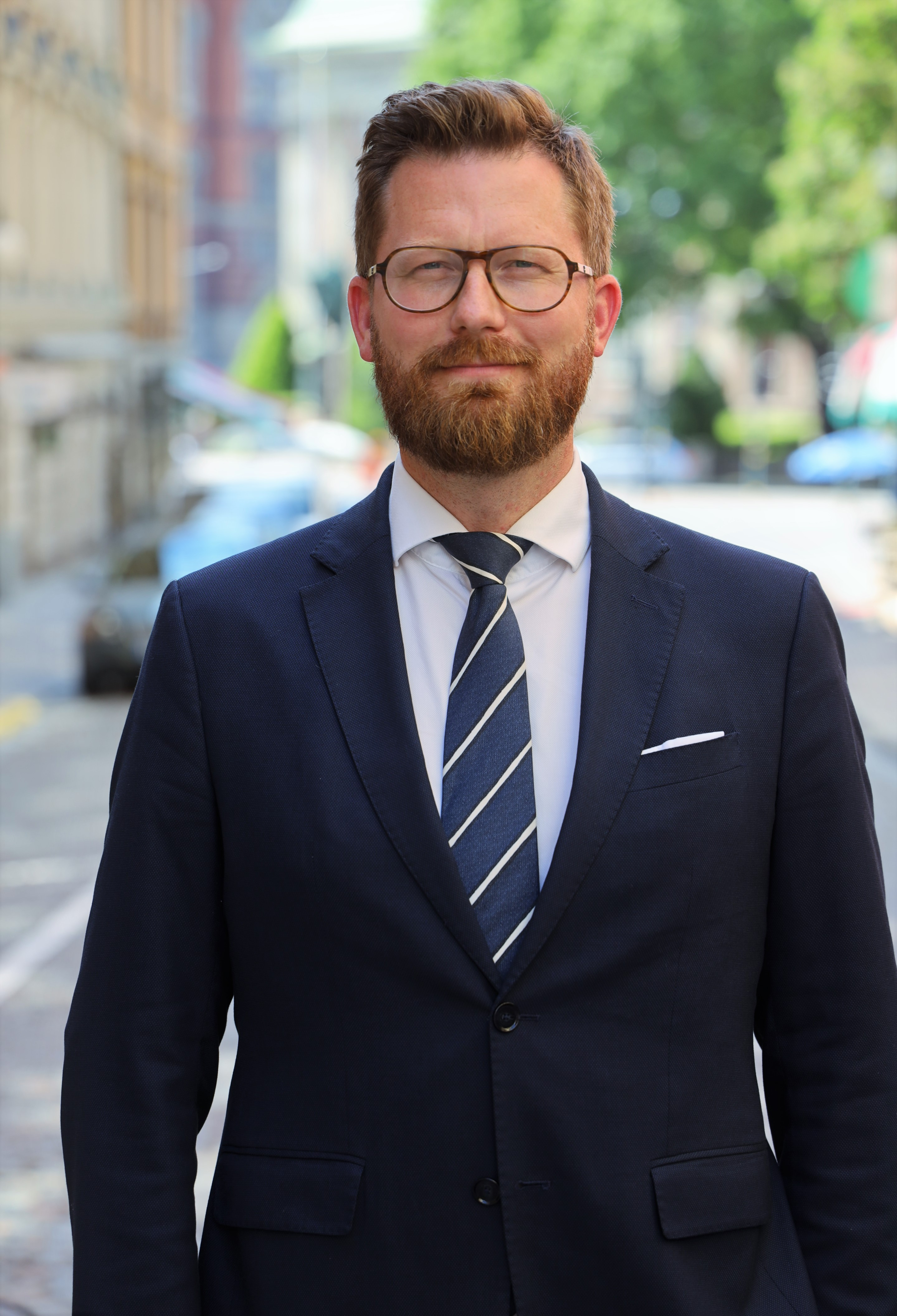
- Tegnér in June 2021

Member of the Riksdag
- Incumbent
- Assumed office 24 September 2018
- Constituency: Stockholm County

Personal details
- Born: Christer Mathias Tegnér; 1979 (age 46–47)
- Party: Social Democratic Party
- Education: Stockholm University

Christer Mathias Tegnér (born 1979) is a Swedish politician, accountant and member of the Riksdag, the national legislature. A member of the Social Democratic Party, he has represented Stockholm County since September 2018. He had previously been a substitute member of the Riksdag for Ibrahim Baylan twice: October 2014 to October 2015; and May 2016 to September 2018.

Tegnér is the son of Christer Tegnér and finance assistant Karin Tegnér (née Marianne Byrhammar). He was educated in Tyresö. He has a history degree from Stockholm University and an economics degree from Stockholm School of Economics (HHS). He has been an accountant since 2009. He has been a member of the municipal council in Tyresö Municipality since 1998. He is chairman of Stockholm Ice Hockey Association and the Hanvikens SK sports club. He is married and has two children.
