= Sanne Lennström =

Swedish politician (born 1988)

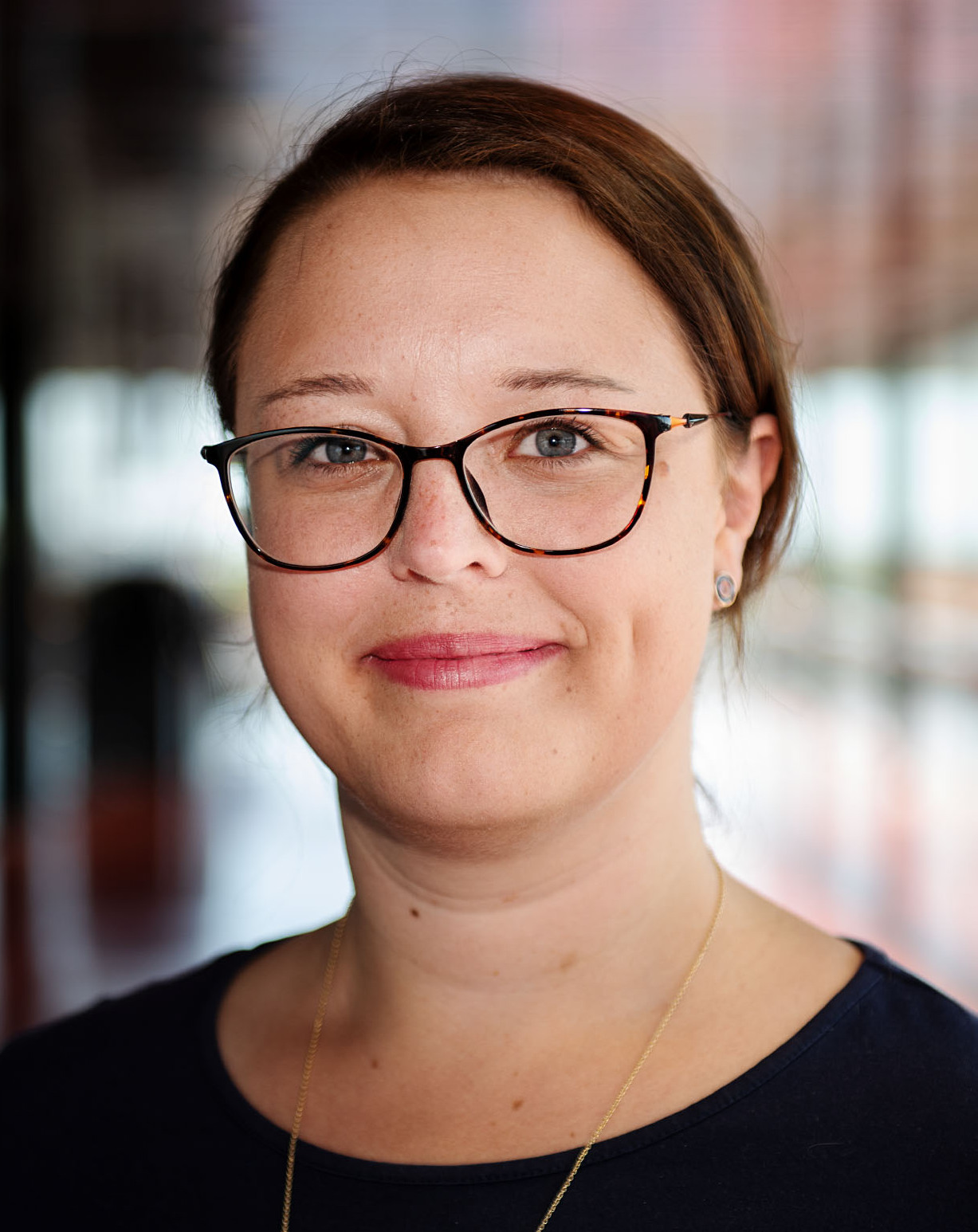
- Lennström in August 2015

Member of the Riksdag
- Incumbent
- Assumed office 24 September 2018
- Constituency: Uppsala County

Personal details
- Born: Sanne Chatarina Johanna Eriksson; 1988 (age 37–38)
- Party: Social Democratic Party

Sanne Chatarina Johanna Lennström (née Eriksson; born 1988) is a Swedish politician and member of the Riksdag, the national legislature. A member of the Social Democratic Party, she has represented Uppsala County since September 2018. She had previously been a substitute member of the Riksdag for Ardalan Shekarabi twice: October 2014 to April 2017; and January 2018 to September 2018.

Lennström is the daughter of metalworker and regional politician Thomas Eriksson and housing manager Monica Bonde Eriksson. She trained to be a teacher at Uppsala University. She has been a member of the municipal council in Östhammar Municipality since 2018.
