= Alexandra Völker =

Swedish politician (born 1989)

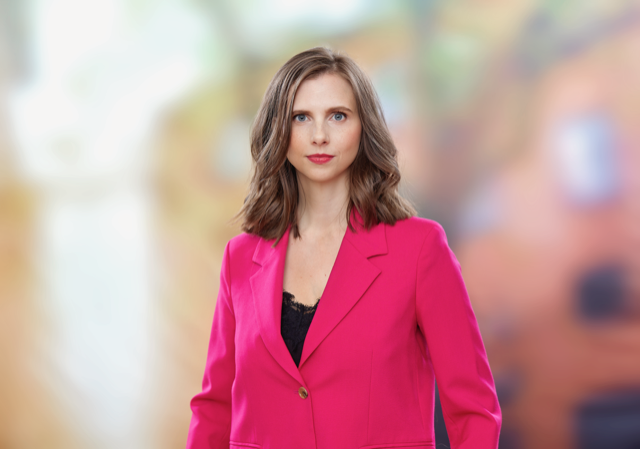
- Völker in June 2022

Member of the Riksdag
- Incumbent
- Assumed office 29 September 2014
- Constituency: Stockholm County

Personal details
- Born: Sofia Alexandra Völker; 1989 (age 36–37)
- Party: Social Democratic Party
- Education: Stockholm University

Sofia Alexandra Völker (born 1989) is a Swedish politician and member of the Riksdag, the national legislature. A member of the Social Democratic Party, she has represented Stockholm County since September 2014.

Völker is the daughter of engineer Per Völker and psychotherapist Marie Lundman Völker. She has a bachelor's degree in politics and a doctorate in political science from Stockholm University. She has been a member of the municipal council in Sundbyberg Municipality since 2014.
