= Västra Götaland County South =

Constituency of the Riksdag, the national legislature of Sweden

- Västra Götalands Läns Södra
- Constituency for the Riksdag
- Location of Västra Götaland County South within Sweden
- Municipality: List: Bollebygd; Borås; Herrljunga; Mark; Svenljunga; Tranemo; Ulricehamn; Vårgårda
- County: Västra Götaland
- Population: 229,580 (2025)
- Electorate: 174,222 (2026)
- Area: 6,125 km^{2} (2026)

Current constituency
- Created: 1970
- Seats: List (Note: Constituency seats only.): 7 (2018–present); 6 (1994–2018); 7 (1991–1994); 6 (1988–1991); 7 (1970–1988)
- Member of the Riksdag: List: Anders Alftberg (SD); Annelie Hastig Olsson (M); Ingemar Kihlström (KD); Petter Löberg (S); Ulrik Nilsson (M); Jessica Rodén (S); Denice Westerberg (SD)
- Created from: Älvsborg County South

Västra Götaland County South (Swedish: Västra Götalands Läns Södra) is one of the 29 multi-member constituencies of the Riksdag, the national legislature of Sweden. The constituency was established as Älvsborg County South (Swedish: Älvsborgs Läns Södra) in 1970 when the Riksdag changed from a bicameral legislature to a unicameral legislature. It was renamed Västra Götaland County South in 1998 when the counties of Älvsborg, Gothenburg and Bohus and Skaraborg were merged to create Västra Götaland. The constituency consists of the municipalities of Bollebygd, Borås, Herrljunga, Mark, Svenljunga, Tranemo, Ulricehamn and Vårgårda. The constituency currently elects seven of the 349 members of the Riksdag using the open party-list proportional representation electoral system. At the 2026 general election it had 174,222 registered electors.

== Electoral system ==
Västra Götaland County North currently elects eight of the 349 members of the Riksdag using the open party-list proportional representation electoral system. Constituency seats are allocated using the modified Sainte-Laguë method. Only parties that reach the 4% national threshold and parties that receive at least 12% of the vote in the constituency compete for constituency seats. Supplementary levelling seats may also be allocated at the constituency level to parties that reach the 4% national threshold.

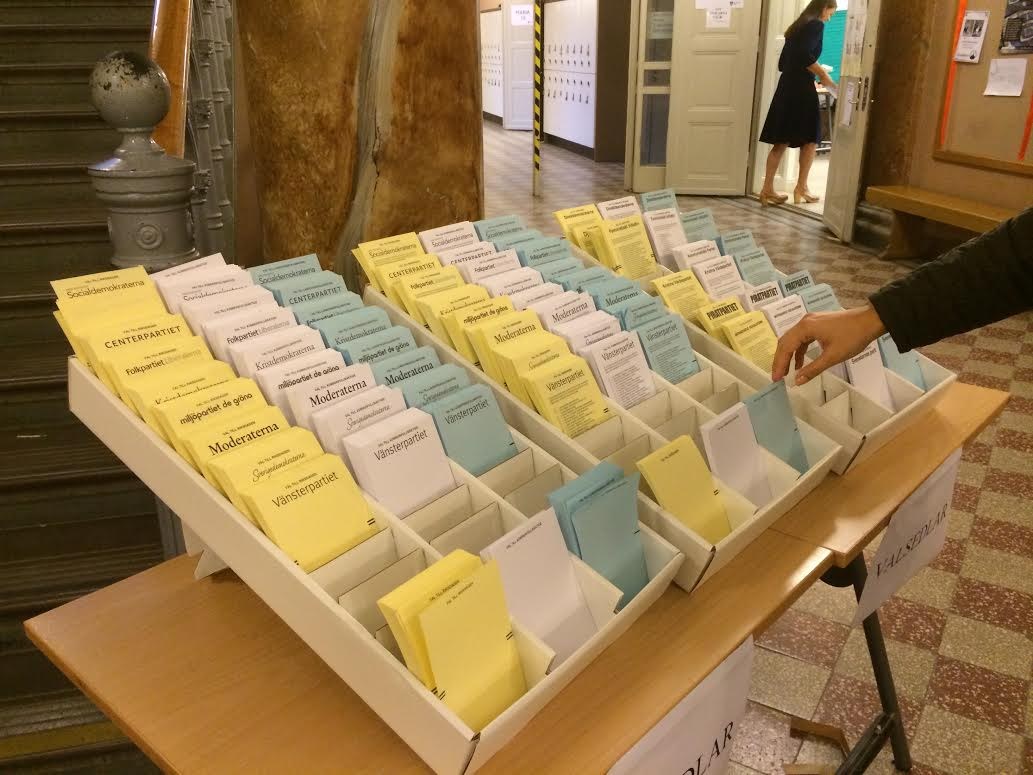
A selection of ballot papers available for voters at the 2014 general election in Stockholm - yellow for the Riksdag, blue for the regional council and white for the municipal council

Prior to 1997 voters could cast any ballot paper they wanted, though it had to contain the name of a party and the name of at least one candidate nominated by that party in the constituency. It was common for parties to hand out ballot papers with their name and list of candidates at the entrance of polling stations. Voters could delete the names of candidates or write-in the names of other candidates but in practice these options weren't used enough by voters to have any significant impact on the results and consequently elections operated as a closed system.

Since 1997, elections in Sweden follow the French model in having separate ballot papers for each party/list in a constituency. There are two ballot papers for each party - a party ballot paper (partivalsedel) with just the name of the party and a name ballot paper (namnvalsedel) with the name of the party and its list of candidates. There are also blank ballot papers (blank valsedel). Voters can initially pick as many ballot papers as they wish and then, in the secrecy of the voting booth, they select a single ballot paper of their choice. If they chose a name ballot paper they have the option of casting a preferential vote for one of their chosen party's candidates. If they chose a blank ballot paper they can write the name of any party including unregistered parties and, optionally, they can write the name of any person as their preferred candidate, even one that does not belong to their chosen party. They then place their chosen ballot paper in an envelope which is placed in the ballot box, discarding all other ballot papers they picked.

Seats won by each party/list in a constituency are allocated to its candidates in order of preference votes (a personal mandate), provided that the candidate has received at least 8% of votes cast for their party in the constituency (5% since January 2011). Any unfilled seats are then allocated to the party's remaining candidates in the order they appear on the party list (a party mandate).

== Election results ==
=== Summary ===
| Election | Left V / VPK | | | Social Democrats S | | | Greens MP | | | Centre C | | | Liberals L / FP / F | | | Moderates M | | | Christian Democrats KD / KDS | | | Sweden Democrats SD | | |
| Election | Votes | % | Seats | Votes | % | Seats | Votes | % | Seats | Votes | % | Seats | Votes | % | Seats | Votes | % | Seats | Votes | % | Seats | Votes | % | Seats |
|---|---|---|---|---|---|---|---|---|---|---|---|---|---|---|---|---|---|---|---|---|---|---|---|---|
| 2026 | 10,365 | 7.10% | 0 | 39,892 | 27.31% | 2 | 6,299 | 4.31% | 0 | 9,781 | 6.70% | 0 | 6,804 | 4.66% | 0 | 28,563 | 19.55% | 2 | 11,502 | 7.87% | 1 | 30,302 | 20.74% | 2 |
| 2022 | 7,583 | 5.34% | 0 | 41,350 | 29.14% | 2 | 5,053 | 3.56% | 0 | 10,063 | 7.09% | 1 | 5,445 | 3.84% | 0 | 26,846 | 18.92% | 2 | 9,871 | 6.96% | 0 | 33,477 | 23.59% | 2 |
| 2018 | 9,213 | 6.42% | 0 | 40,234 | 28.04% | 2 | 4,891 | 3.41% | 0 | 13,760 | 9.59% | 1 | 7,624 | 5.31% | 0 | 27,197 | 18.95% | 2 | 10,445 | 7.28% | 0 | 28,221 | 19.67% | 2 |
| 2014 | 6,520 | 5.22% | 0 | 38,791 | 31.06% | 3 | 7,534 | 6.03% | 0 | 9,423 | 7.54% | 0 | 6,145 | 4.92% | 0 | 27,795 | 22.26% | 2 | 6,376 | 5.11% | 0 | 18,773 | 15.03% | 1 |
| 2010 | 6,136 | 5.06% | 0 | 37,817 | 31.21% | 3 | 7,315 | 6.04% | 0 | 9,273 | 7.65% | 0 | 8,883 | 7.33% | 0 | 34,334 | 28.33% | 3 | 7,745 | 6.39% | 0 | 8,350 | 6.89% | 0 |
| 2006 | 6,233 | 5.50% | 0 | 40,429 | 35.69% | 3 | 4,488 | 3.96% | 0 | 10,726 | 9.47% | 1 | 7,373 | 6.51% | 0 | 27,238 | 24.05% | 2 | 9,093 | 8.03% | 0 | 3,600 | 3.18% | 0 |
| 2002 | 8,188 | 7.48% | 0 | 44,822 | 40.94% | 3 | 4,224 | 3.86% | 0 | 8,790 | 8.03% | 0 | 11,951 | 10.92% | 1 | 15,218 | 13.90% | 1 | 13,546 | 12.37% | 1 | 1,341 | 1.23% | 0 |
| 1998 | 12,719 | 11.58% | 1 | 39,791 | 36.24% | 3 | 5,079 | 4.63% | 0 | 7,781 | 7.09% | 0 | 4,004 | 3.65% | 0 | 22,144 | 20.17% | 1 | 16,775 | 15.28% | 1 | | | |
| 1994 | 5,961 | 5.06% | 0 | 53,754 | 45.59% | 3 | 6,029 | 5.11% | 0 | 12,763 | 10.82% | 1 | 7,249 | 6.15% | 0 | 25,002 | 21.20% | 2 | 5,372 | 4.56% | 0 | | | |
| 1991 | 3,865 | 3.29% | 0 | 43,710 | 37.21% | 3 | 3,259 | 2.77% | 0 | 13,507 | 11.50% | 1 | 9,641 | 8.21% | 0 | 24,109 | 20.52% | 2 | 11,390 | 9.70% | 1 | | | |
| 1988 | 4,573 | 3.94% | 0 | 50,092 | 43.12% | 3 | 5,890 | 5.07% | 0 | 17,432 | 15.01% | 1 | 12,970 | 11.16% | 1 | 20,923 | 18.01% | 1 | 4,197 | 3.61% | 0 | | | |
| 1985 | 4,475 | 3.73% | 0 | 50,458 | 42.02% | 3 | 1,366 | 1.14% | 0 | 20,474 | 17.05% | 1 | 16,838 | 14.02% | 1 | 26,140 | 21.77% | 2 | with C | | | | | |
| 1982 | 4,602 | 3.82% | 0 | 50,772 | 42.18% | 3 | 1,702 | 1.41% | 0 | 23,741 | 19.72% | 2 | 6,787 | 5.64% | 0 | 30,318 | 25.19% | 2 | 2,339 | 1.94% | 0 | | | |
| 1979 | 4,344 | 3.66% | 0 | 47,560 | 40.02% | 3 | | | | 26,672 | 22.44% | 2 | 11,792 | 9.92% | 0 | 26,419 | 22.23% | 2 | 1,719 | 1.45% | 0 | | | |
| 1976 | 3,444 | 2.90% | 0 | 46,174 | 38.94% | 3 | | | | 33,734 | 28.45% | 2 | 11,174 | 9.42% | 1 | 22,467 | 18.95% | 1 | 1,431 | 1.21% | 0 | | | |
| 1973 | 3,708 | 3.27% | 0 | 44,741 | 39.44% | 3 | | | | 32,874 | 28.98% | 2 | 8,611 | 7.59% | 0 | 21,385 | 18.85% | 2 | 1,782 | 1.57% | 0 | | | |
| 1970 | 3,215 | 2.87% | 0 | 44,649 | 39.91% | 3 | | | | 27,070 | 24.20% | 2 | 15,283 | 13.66% | 1 | 19,952 | 17.83% | 1 | 1,376 | 1.23% | 0 | | | |

(Excludes levelling seats. Figures in italics represent alliances/joint lists.)

=== Detailed ===
Party has received at least 4% of the vote nationally and is entitled to compete for constituency seats.

==== 2020s ====
===== 2026 =====
Results of the 2026 general election held on 13 September 2026:

| Party | | Votes per municipality | | | | | | | | Total votes | % | Seats | | |
| Party | | Bolle- bygd | Borås | Herrl- junga | Mark | Svenl- junga | Trane- mo | Ulrice- hamn | Vår- gårda | Total votes | % | Con. | Lev. | Tot. |
|---|---|---|---|---|---|---|---|---|---|---|---|---|---|---|
| Swedish Social Democratic Party | S | 1,549 | 20,992 | 1,462 | 6,254 | 1,486 | 2,072 | 4,103 | 1,974 | 39,892 | 27.31% | 2 | 0 | 2 |
| Sweden Democrats | SD | 1,637 | 13,522 | 1,483 | 5,010 | 1,851 | 1,608 | 3,426 | 1,765 | 30,302 | 20.74% | 2 | 0 | 2 |
| Moderate Party | M | 1,392 | 14,453 | 1,214 | 4,047 | 1,306 | 1,453 | 3,382 | 1,316 | 28,563 | 19.55% | 2 | 0 | 2 |
| Christian Democrats | KD | 504 | 4,846 | 647 | 1,962 | 585 | 608 | 1,366 | 984 | 11,502 | 7.87% | 1 | 0 | 1 |
| Left Party | V | 264 | 6,395 | 315 | 1,307 | 292 | 460 | 887 | 445 | 10,365 | 7.10% | 0 | 0 | 0 |
| Centre Party | C | 403 | 3,877 | 531 | 1,758 | 426 | 659 | 1,364 | 763 | 9,781 | 6.70% | 0 | 0 | 0 |
| Liberals | L | 339 | 3,311 | 277 | 1,041 | 398 | 289 | 805 | 344 | 6,804 | 4.66% | 0 | 0 | 0 |
| Green Party | MP | 319 | 3,209 | 249 | 957 | 206 | 265 | 692 | 402 | 6,299 | 4.31% | 0 | 0 | 0 |
| Örebro Party | ÖP | 43 | 271 | 56 | 160 | 46 | 51 | 127 | 69 | 823 | 0.56% | 0 | 0 | 0 |
| Alternative for Sweden | AfS | 34 | 332 | 34 | 100 | 30 | 24 | 98 | 39 | 691 | 0.47% | 0 | 0 | 0 |
| Christian Values Party | KrVP | 6 | 149 | 29 | 71 | 5 | 5 | 19 | 29 | 313 | 0.21% | 0 | 0 | 0 |
| Ambition Sweden | AS | 17 | 93 | 10 | 50 | 12 | 20 | 21 | 15 | 238 | 0.16% | 0 | 0 | 0 |
| Pirate Party | PP | 4 | 63 | 6 | 30 | 2 | 4 | 10 | 5 | 124 | 0.08% | 0 | 0 | 0 |
| Human Rights and Democracy | MoD | 1 | 39 | 1 | 20 | 11 | 14 | 10 | 3 | 99 | 0.07% | 0 | 0 | 0 |
| Communist Party of Sweden | SKP | 1 | 82 | 4 | 5 | 2 | 3 | 0 | 1 | 98 | 0.07% | 0 | 0 | 0 |
| Citizens' Coalition | MED | 6 | 50 | 5 | 6 | 2 | 2 | 3 | 7 | 81 | 0.06% | 0 | 0 | 0 |
| Independent Rural Party | LPo | 0 | 1 | 1 | 1 | 18 | 0 | 3 | 2 | 26 | 0.02% | 0 | 0 | 0 |
| Direct Democrats | DD | 2 | 6 | 1 | 6 | 0 | 1 | 3 | 2 | 21 | 0.01% | 0 | 0 | 0 |
| United Voice | ER | 1 | 4 | 3 | 6 | 1 | 2 | 1 | 1 | 19 | 0.01% | 0 | 0 | 0 |
| Nuance Party | PNy | 0 | 6 | 0 | 0 | 0 | 0 | 1 | 0 | 7 | 0.00% | 0 | 0 | 0 |
| RegleraAI.nu | | 1 | 0 | 0 | 1 | 0 | 0 | 0 | 3 | 5 | 0.00% | 0 | 0 | 0 |
| The Push Buttons | Kn | 0 | 3 | 1 | 0 | 0 | 0 | 0 | 1 | 5 | 0.00% | 0 | 0 | 0 |
| Nordic Resistance Movement | NMR | 0 | 1 | 1 | 1 | 0 | 1 | 0 | 0 | 4 | 0.00% | 0 | 0 | 0 |
| Unity | ENH | 0 | 2 | 1 | 1 | 0 | 0 | 0 | 0 | 4 | 0.00% | 0 | 0 | 0 |
| Donald Duck Party | | 0 | 1 | 0 | 1 | 0 | 0 | 1 | 0 | 3 | 0.00% | 0 | 0 | 0 |
| Classical Liberal Party | KLP | 0 | 2 | 0 | 0 | 0 | 0 | 0 | 0 | 2 | 0.00% | 0 | 0 | 0 |
| For the Good of All | | 0 | 0 | 0 | 0 | 0 | 2 | 0 | 0 | 2 | 0.00% | 0 | 0 | 0 |
| Turning Point Party | PV | 0 | 0 | 0 | 0 | 0 | 0 | 2 | 0 | 2 | 0.00% | 0 | 0 | 0 |
| 99 Black Balloons | | 0 | 1 | 0 | 0 | 0 | 0 | 0 | 0 | 1 | 0.00% | 0 | 0 | 0 |
| A Good Sweden | | 0 | 1 | 0 | 0 | 0 | 0 | 0 | 0 | 1 | 0.00% | 0 | 0 | 0 |
| Anti-Party Party | | 0 | 0 | 0 | 1 | 0 | 0 | 0 | 0 | 1 | 0.00% | 0 | 0 | 0 |
| Christian Freedom Party | | 0 | 1 | 0 | 0 | 0 | 0 | 0 | 0 | 1 | 0.00% | 0 | 0 | 0 |
| Evil Chicken Party | OKP | 0 | 1 | 0 | 0 | 0 | 0 | 0 | 0 | 1 | 0.00% | 0 | 0 | 0 |
| Pax | | 0 | 0 | 0 | 0 | 0 | 0 | 1 | 0 | 1 | 0.00% | 0 | 0 | 0 |
| Valid votes | | 6,523 | 71,714 | 6,331 | 22,796 | 6,679 | 7,543 | 16,325 | 8,170 | 146,081 | 100.00% | 7 | 0 | 7 |
| Blank votes | | 57 | 573 | 62 | 240 | 77 | 91 | 169 | 77 | 1,346 | 0.91% | | | |
| Rejected votes – unregistered parties | | 1 | 12 | 1 | 6 | 3 | 1 | 4 | 1 | 29 | 0.02% | | | |
| Rejected votes – other | | 2 | 13 | 2 | 21 | 9 | 1 | 7 | 4 | 59 | 0.04% | | | |
| Total polled | | 6,583 | 72,312 | 6,396 | 23,063 | 6,768 | 7,636 | 16,505 | 8,252 | 147,515 | 84.67% | | | |
| Registered electors | | 7,432 | 86,880 | 7,356 | 26,950 | 8,061 | 9,011 | 19,155 | 9,377 | 174,222 | | | | |
| Turnout | | 88.58% | 83.23% | 86.95% | 85.58% | 83.96% | 84.74% | 86.17% | 88.00% | 84.67% | | | | |

The following candidates were elected:

- Constituency seats (party mandates) - Anders Alftberg (SD), 113 votes; Annelie Hastig Olsson (M), 325 votes; Ingemar Kihlström (KD), 142 votes; Petter Löberg (S), 1,845 votes; Ulrik Nilsson (M), 1,082 votes; Jessica Rodén (S), 673 votes; and Denice Westerberg (SD), 21 votes.

===== 2022 =====
Results of the 2022 general election held on 11 September 2022:

| Party | | Votes per municipality | | | | | | | | Total votes | % | Seats | | |
| Party | | Bolle- bygd | Borås | Herrl- junga | Mark | Svenl- junga | Trane- mo | Ulrice- hamn | Vår- gårda | Total votes | % | Con. | Lev. | Tot. |
|---|---|---|---|---|---|---|---|---|---|---|---|---|---|---|
| Swedish Social Democratic Party | S | 1,627 | 20,724 | 1,638 | 6,909 | 1,721 | 2,280 | 4,365 | 2,086 | 41,350 | 29.14% | 2 | 0 | 2 |
| Sweden Democrats | SD | 1,763 | 14,652 | 1,664 | 5,627 | 2,144 | 1,850 | 3,860 | 1,917 | 33,477 | 23.59% | 2 | 0 | 2 |
| Moderate Party | M | 1,278 | 13,753 | 1,029 | 3,733 | 1,194 | 1,455 | 3,202 | 1,202 | 26,846 | 18.92% | 2 | 0 | 2 |
| Centre Party | C | 412 | 4,043 | 574 | 1,713 | 455 | 663 | 1,454 | 749 | 10,063 | 7.09% | 1 | 0 | 1 |
| Christian Democrats | KD | 420 | 4,305 | 592 | 1,557 | 534 | 496 | 1,155 | 812 | 9,871 | 6.96% | 0 | 1 | 1 |
| Left Party | V | 272 | 4,197 | 294 | 1,212 | 249 | 309 | 714 | 336 | 7,583 | 5.34% | 0 | 0 | 0 |
| Liberals | L | 258 | 2,889 | 233 | 722 | 209 | 217 | 648 | 269 | 5,445 | 3.84% | 0 | 0 | 0 |
| Green Party | MP | 248 | 2,563 | 172 | 773 | 185 | 231 | 564 | 317 | 5,053 | 3.56% | 0 | 0 | 0 |
| Nuance Party | PNy | 3 | 438 | 1 | 8 | 2 | 8 | 16 | 15 | 491 | 0.35% | 0 | 0 | 0 |
| Alternative for Sweden | AfS | 21 | 167 | 30 | 111 | 20 | 14 | 51 | 22 | 436 | 0.31% | 0 | 0 | 0 |
| Citizens' Coalition | MED | 24 | 108 | 10 | 50 | 8 | 19 | 30 | 15 | 264 | 0.19% | 0 | 0 | 0 |
| Human Rights and Democracy | MoD | 11 | 147 | 9 | 28 | 11 | 19 | 15 | 10 | 250 | 0.18% | 0 | 0 | 0 |
| Christian Values Party | KrVP | 5 | 64 | 21 | 44 | 2 | 9 | 28 | 6 | 179 | 0.13% | 0 | 0 | 0 |
| Pirate Party | PP | 2 | 75 | 6 | 32 | 2 | 15 | 15 | 11 | 158 | 0.11% | 0 | 0 | 0 |
| The Push Buttons | Kn | 1 | 59 | 9 | 44 | 2 | 0 | 8 | 6 | 129 | 0.09% | 0 | 0 | 0 |
| Independent Rural Party | LPo | 0 | 1 | 5 | 11 | 25 | 5 | 13 | 11 | 71 | 0.05% | 0 | 0 | 0 |
| Feminist Initiative | FI | 4 | 21 | 4 | 12 | 2 | 1 | 9 | 1 | 54 | 0.04% | 0 | 0 | 0 |
| Unity | ENH | 0 | 20 | 2 | 6 | 1 | 7 | 4 | 0 | 40 | 0.03% | 0 | 0 | 0 |
| Direct Democrats | DD | 3 | 10 | 1 | 11 | 0 | 4 | 5 | 4 | 38 | 0.03% | 0 | 0 | 0 |
| Socialist Welfare Party | S-V | 0 | 23 | 0 | 2 | 0 | 0 | 0 | 2 | 27 | 0.02% | 0 | 0 | 0 |
| Climate Alliance | KA | 2 | 3 | 1 | 9 | 0 | 0 | 4 | 0 | 19 | 0.01% | 0 | 0 | 0 |
| Nordic Resistance Movement | NMR | 0 | 6 | 2 | 2 | 1 | 2 | 2 | 1 | 16 | 0.01% | 0 | 0 | 0 |
| Communist Party of Sweden | SKP | 0 | 1 | 5 | 6 | 0 | 1 | 0 | 2 | 15 | 0.01% | 0 | 0 | 0 |
| Classical Liberal Party | KLP | 1 | 3 | 0 | 4 | 0 | 0 | 1 | 0 | 9 | 0.01% | 0 | 0 | 0 |
| Sweden Out of the EU/ Free Justice Party | | 0 | 0 | 0 | 3 | 0 | 2 | 0 | 0 | 5 | 0.00% | 0 | 0 | 0 |
| Turning Point Party | PV | 0 | 4 | 0 | 1 | 0 | 0 | 0 | 0 | 5 | 0.00% | 0 | 0 | 0 |
| Basic Income Party | BASIP | 0 | 2 | 0 | 0 | 0 | 0 | 0 | 0 | 2 | 0.00% | 0 | 0 | 0 |
| Evil Chicken Party | OKP | 0 | 1 | 0 | 1 | 0 | 0 | 0 | 0 | 2 | 0.00% | 0 | 0 | 0 |
| Freedom Party | | 0 | 2 | 0 | 0 | 0 | 0 | 0 | 0 | 2 | 0.00% | 0 | 0 | 0 |
| Donald Duck Party | | 0 | 1 | 0 | 0 | 0 | 0 | 0 | 0 | 1 | 0.00% | 0 | 0 | 0 |
| Freedom of the Family | | 0 | 0 | 0 | 1 | 0 | 0 | 0 | 0 | 1 | 0.00% | 0 | 0 | 0 |
| Green Democrats | | 0 | 0 | 0 | 0 | 0 | 0 | 0 | 1 | 1 | 0.00% | 0 | 0 | 0 |
| Hard Line Sweden | | 0 | 0 | 0 | 0 | 1 | 0 | 0 | 0 | 1 | 0.00% | 0 | 0 | 0 |
| Political Shift | | 1 | 0 | 0 | 0 | 0 | 0 | 0 | 0 | 1 | 0.00% | 0 | 0 | 0 |
| United Democratic Party | | 0 | 1 | 0 | 0 | 0 | 0 | 0 | 0 | 1 | 0.00% | 0 | 0 | 0 |
| Valid votes | | 6,356 | 68,283 | 6,302 | 22,632 | 6,768 | 7,607 | 16,163 | 7,795 | 141,906 | 100.00% | 7 | 1 | 8 |
| Blank votes | | 54 | 668 | 80 | 290 | 106 | 103 | 199 | 83 | 1,583 | 1.10% | | | |
| Rejected votes – unregistered parties | | 1 | 17 | 2 | 3 | 2 | 1 | 4 | 2 | 32 | 0.02% | | | |
| Rejected votes – other | | 3 | 56 | 10 | 22 | 13 | 5 | 9 | 4 | 122 | 0.08% | | | |
| Total polled | | 6,414 | 69,024 | 6,394 | 22,947 | 6,889 | 7,716 | 16,375 | 7,884 | 143,643 | 84.44% | | | |
| Registered electors | | 7,202 | 83,786 | 7,313 | 26,700 | 8,140 | 8,981 | 18,972 | 9,013 | 170,107 | | | | |
| Turnout | | 89.06% | 82.38% | 87.43% | 85.94% | 84.63% | 85.91% | 86.31% | 87.47% | 84.44% | | | | |

The following candidates were elected:

- Constituency seats (personal mandates) - Mikael Larsson (C), 572 votes.
- Constituency seats (party mandates) - Anders Alftberg (SD), 126 votes; Jan Ericson (M), 1,083 votes; Patrik Jönsson (SD), 0 votes; Petter Löberg (S), 1,339 votes; Ulrik Nilsson (M), 438 votes; and Jessica Rodén (S), 1,065 votes.
- Levelling seats (party mandates) - Ingemar Kihlström (KD), 210 votes.

==== 2010s ====
===== 2018 =====
Results of the 2018 general election held on 9 September 2018:

| Party | | Votes per municipality | | | | | | | | Total votes | % | Seats | | |
| Party | | Bolle- bygd | Borås | Herrl- junga | Mark | Svenl- junga | Trane- mo | Ulrice- hamn | Vår- gårda | Total votes | % | Con. | Lev. | Tot. |
|---|---|---|---|---|---|---|---|---|---|---|---|---|---|---|
| Swedish Social Democratic Party | S | 1,452 | 20,640 | 1,578 | 6,624 | 1,774 | 2,296 | 3,982 | 1,888 | 40,234 | 28.04% | 2 | 0 | 2 |
| Sweden Democrats | SD | 1,482 | 12,840 | 1,389 | 4,515 | 1,760 | 1,519 | 3,154 | 1,562 | 28,221 | 19.67% | 2 | 0 | 2 |
| Moderate Party | M | 1,256 | 14,354 | 1,066 | 3,640 | 1,199 | 1,377 | 3,167 | 1,138 | 27,197 | 18.95% | 2 | 0 | 2 |
| Centre Party | C | 551 | 5,077 | 787 | 2,426 | 821 | 1,077 | 2,081 | 940 | 13,760 | 9.59% | 1 | 0 | 1 |
| Christian Democrats | KD | 480 | 4,629 | 562 | 1,608 | 466 | 479 | 1,278 | 943 | 10,445 | 7.28% | 0 | 1 | 1 |
| Left Party | V | 321 | 4,905 | 384 | 1,653 | 283 | 348 | 891 | 428 | 9,213 | 6.42% | 0 | 0 | 0 |
| Liberals | L | 348 | 3,984 | 311 | 1,243 | 295 | 293 | 821 | 329 | 7,624 | 5.31% | 0 | 0 | 0 |
| Green Party | MP | 254 | 2,559 | 175 | 754 | 148 | 210 | 520 | 271 | 4,891 | 3.41% | 0 | 0 | 0 |
| Feminist Initiative | FI | 20 | 239 | 27 | 73 | 20 | 16 | 36 | 19 | 450 | 0.31% | 0 | 0 | 0 |
| Alternative for Sweden | AfS | 10 | 214 | 24 | 59 | 19 | 25 | 69 | 28 | 448 | 0.31% | 0 | 0 | 0 |
| Pirate Party | PP | 6 | 120 | 11 | 23 | 6 | 5 | 17 | 9 | 197 | 0.14% | 0 | 0 | 0 |
| Citizens' Coalition | MED | 11 | 96 | 13 | 41 | 6 | 8 | 12 | 8 | 195 | 0.14% | 0 | 0 | 0 |
| Independent Rural Party | LPo | 1 | 21 | 8 | 7 | 61 | 8 | 23 | 5 | 134 | 0.09% | 0 | 0 | 0 |
| Unity | ENH | 4 | 51 | 7 | 23 | 7 | 8 | 14 | 6 | 120 | 0.08% | 0 | 0 | 0 |
| Direct Democrats | DD | 7 | 44 | 5 | 18 | 3 | 7 | 6 | 6 | 96 | 0.07% | 0 | 0 | 0 |
| Animal Party | DjuP | 2 | 35 | 1 | 21 | 7 | 2 | 13 | 13 | 94 | 0.07% | 0 | 0 | 0 |
| Christian Values Party | KrVP | 2 | 51 | 9 | 19 | 4 | 0 | 3 | 3 | 91 | 0.06% | 0 | 0 | 0 |
| Nordic Resistance Movement | NMR | 0 | 19 | 2 | 7 | 0 | 3 | 4 | 0 | 35 | 0.02% | 0 | 0 | 0 |
| Classical Liberal Party | KLP | 1 | 17 | 0 | 4 | 2 | 0 | 2 | 1 | 27 | 0.02% | 0 | 0 | 0 |
| Basic Income Party | BASIP | 1 | 5 | 2 | 2 | 3 | 1 | 1 | 0 | 15 | 0.01% | 0 | 0 | 0 |
| Initiative | INI | 0 | 0 | 0 | 2 | 0 | 0 | 2 | 1 | 5 | 0.00% | 0 | 0 | 0 |
| Communist Party of Sweden | SKP | 0 | 1 | 1 | 2 | 0 | 0 | 0 | 0 | 4 | 0.00% | 0 | 0 | 0 |
| European Workers Party | EAP | 0 | 0 | 0 | 1 | 0 | 0 | 0 | 0 | 1 | 0.00% | 0 | 0 | 0 |
| Scania Party | SKÅ | 0 | 1 | 0 | 0 | 0 | 0 | 0 | 0 | 1 | 0.00% | 0 | 0 | 0 |
| Security Party | TRP | 0 | 0 | 0 | 1 | 0 | 0 | 0 | 0 | 1 | 0.00% | 0 | 0 | 0 |
| Parties not on the ballot | | 0 | 2 | 0 | 4 | 0 | 0 | 0 | 0 | 6 | 0.00% | 0 | 0 | 0 |
| Valid votes | | 6,209 | 69,904 | 6,362 | 22,770 | 6,884 | 7,682 | 16,096 | 7,598 | 143,505 | 100.00% | 7 | 1 | 8 |
| Blank votes | | 59 | 528 | 76 | 247 | 84 | 90 | 146 | 67 | 1,297 | 0.89% | | | |
| Rejected votes – unregistered parties | | 1 | 21 | 1 | 10 | 2 | 3 | 5 | 0 | 43 | 0.03% | | | |
| Rejected votes – other | | 4 | 32 | 7 | 10 | 4 | 3 | 10 | 3 | 73 | 0.05% | | | |
| Total polled | | 6,273 | 70,485 | 6,446 | 23,037 | 6,974 | 7,778 | 16,257 | 7,668 | 144,918 | 87.44% | | | |
| Registered electors | | 6,915 | 81,563 | 7,255 | 26,180 | 8,014 | 8,821 | 18,404 | 8,573 | 165,725 | | | | |
| Turnout | | 90.72% | 86.42% | 88.85% | 87.99% | 87.02% | 88.18% | 88.33% | 89.44% | 87.44% | | | | |

The following candidates were elected:

- Constituency seats (personal mandates) - Mikael Larsson (C), 826 votes; and Cecilie Tenfjord-Toftby (M), 1,799 votes.
- Constituency seats (party mandates) - Ann-Christin Ahlberg (S), 1,748 votes; Jan Ericson (M), 760 votes; Patrik Jönsson (SD), 2 votes; Petter Löberg (S), 1,017 votes; and Caroline Nordengrip (SD), 181 votes.
- Levelling seats (party mandates) - Ingemar Kihlström (KD), 102 votes.

===== 2014 =====
Results of the 2014 general election held on 14 September 2014:

| Party | | Votes per municipality | | | | | | Total votes | % | Seats | | |
| Party | | Bolle- bygd | Borås | Mark | Svenl- junga | Trane- mo | Ulrice- hamn | Total votes | % | Con. | Lev. | Tot. |
|---|---|---|---|---|---|---|---|---|---|---|---|---|
| Swedish Social Democratic Party | S | 1,569 | 21,131 | 7,352 | 2,000 | 2,514 | 4,225 | 38,791 | 31.06% | 3 | 0 | 3 |
| Moderate Party | M | 1,427 | 15,679 | 4,193 | 1,410 | 1,539 | 3,547 | 27,795 | 22.26% | 2 | 0 | 2 |
| Sweden Democrats | SD | 1,074 | 9,716 | 3,274 | 1,256 | 1,165 | 2,288 | 18,773 | 15.03% | 1 | 0 | 1 |
| Centre Party | C | 459 | 3,312 | 1,972 | 755 | 994 | 1,931 | 9,423 | 7.54% | 0 | 0 | 0 |
| Green Party | MP | 304 | 4,572 | 1,196 | 233 | 340 | 889 | 7,534 | 6.03% | 0 | 0 | 0 |
| Left Party | V | 252 | 3,874 | 1,244 | 215 | 242 | 693 | 6,520 | 5.22% | 0 | 0 | 0 |
| Christian Democrats | KD | 296 | 3,465 | 1,149 | 280 | 312 | 874 | 6,376 | 5.11% | 0 | 0 | 0 |
| Liberal People's Party | FP | 270 | 3,513 | 1,145 | 264 | 267 | 686 | 6,145 | 4.92% | 0 | 0 | 0 |
| Feminist Initiative | FI | 105 | 1,492 | 440 | 90 | 124 | 233 | 2,484 | 1.99% | 0 | 0 | 0 |
| Pirate Party | PP | 27 | 275 | 66 | 22 | 27 | 40 | 457 | 0.37% | 0 | 0 | 0 |
| Unity | ENH | 1 | 51 | 25 | 8 | 15 | 21 | 121 | 0.10% | 0 | 0 | 0 |
| Independent Rural Party | LPo | 0 | 10 | 8 | 76 | 0 | 5 | 99 | 0.08% | 0 | 0 | 0 |
| Party of the Swedes | SVP | 3 | 45 | 29 | 4 | 5 | 10 | 96 | 0.08% | 0 | 0 | 0 |
| Christian Values Party | KrVP | 0 | 46 | 27 | 1 | 0 | 7 | 81 | 0.06% | 0 | 0 | 0 |
| Animal Party | DjuP | 2 | 27 | 24 | 2 | 5 | 2 | 62 | 0.05% | 0 | 0 | 0 |
| Classical Liberal Party | KLP | 0 | 20 | 1 | 2 | 0 | 2 | 25 | 0.02% | 0 | 0 | 0 |
| Direct Democrats | DD | 5 | 8 | 3 | 0 | 0 | 1 | 17 | 0.01% | 0 | 0 | 0 |
| Progressive Party | | 0 | 15 | 0 | 0 | 1 | 0 | 16 | 0.01% | 0 | 0 | 0 |
| Swedish Senior Citizen Interest Party | SPI | 0 | 7 | 1 | 1 | 0 | 1 | 10 | 0.01% | 0 | 0 | 0 |
| Communist Party of Sweden | SKP | 0 | 8 | 0 | 0 | 0 | 0 | 8 | 0.01% | 0 | 0 | 0 |
| Crossroads | | 1 | 3 | 1 | 0 | 0 | 2 | 7 | 0.01% | 0 | 0 | 0 |
| Socialist Justice Party | RS | 0 | 4 | 1 | 0 | 0 | 0 | 5 | 0.00% | 0 | 0 | 0 |
| Health Party | | 1 | 1 | 0 | 0 | 0 | 1 | 3 | 0.00% | 0 | 0 | 0 |
| European Workers Party | EAP | 0 | 0 | 1 | 0 | 0 | 0 | 1 | 0.00% | 0 | 0 | 0 |
| Parties not on the ballot | | 6 | 21 | 9 | 0 | 4 | 3 | 43 | 0.03% | 0 | 0 | 0 |
| Valid votes | | 5,802 | 67,295 | 22,161 | 6,619 | 7,554 | 15,461 | 124,892 | 100.00% | 6 | 0 | 6 |
| Blank votes | | 56 | 688 | 262 | 97 | 79 | 132 | 1,314 | 1.04% | | | |
| Rejected votes – other | | 1 | 7 | 5 | 1 | 16 | 2 | 32 | 0.03% | | | |
| Total polled | | 5,859 | 67,990 | 22,428 | 6,717 | 7,649 | 15,595 | 126,238 | 85.73% | | | |
| Registered electors | | 6,538 | 80,115 | 25,953 | 7,932 | 8,820 | 17,897 | 147,255 | | | | |
| Turnout | | 89.61% | 84.87% | 86.42% | 84.68% | 86.72% | 87.14% | 85.73% | | | | |

The following candidates were elected:

- Constituency seats (personal mandates) - Cecilie Tenfjord-Toftby (M), 1,665 votes.
- Constituency seats (party mandates) - Ann-Christin Ahlberg (S), 948 votes; Phia Andersson (S), 958 votes; Jan Ericson (M), 1,073 votes; Petter Löberg (S), 1,231 votes; and Kristina Winberg (SD), 15 votes.

Permanent substitutions:

- Kristina Winberg (SD) resigned on 29 September 2014 and was replaced by Nina Kain (SD) on 30 September 2014.

===== 2010 =====
Results of the 2010 general election held on 19 September 2010:

| Party | | Votes per municipality | | | | | | Total votes | % | Seats | | |
| Party | | Bolle- bygd | Borås | Mark | Svenl- junga | Trane- mo | Ulrice- hamn | Total votes | % | Con. | Lev. | Tot. |
|---|---|---|---|---|---|---|---|---|---|---|---|---|
| Swedish Social Democratic Party | S | 1,453 | 20,800 | 7,394 | 1,883 | 2,384 | 3,903 | 37,817 | 31.21% | 3 | 0 | 3 |
| Moderate Party | M | 1,812 | 18,978 | 5,326 | 1,862 | 1,986 | 4,370 | 34,334 | 28.33% | 3 | 0 | 3 |
| Centre Party | C | 395 | 3,091 | 2,017 | 909 | 1,048 | 1,813 | 9,273 | 7.65% | 0 | 0 | 0 |
| Liberal People's Party | FP | 355 | 5,018 | 1,643 | 418 | 439 | 1,010 | 8,883 | 7.33% | 0 | 0 | 0 |
| Sweden Democrats | SD | 448 | 4,616 | 1,267 | 510 | 514 | 995 | 8,350 | 6.89% | 0 | 0 | 0 |
| Christian Democrats | KD | 358 | 4,014 | 1,458 | 335 | 410 | 1,170 | 7,745 | 6.39% | 0 | 0 | 0 |
| Green Party | MP | 335 | 4,216 | 1,245 | 247 | 363 | 909 | 7,315 | 6.04% | 0 | 0 | 0 |
| Left Party | V | 255 | 3,644 | 1,222 | 200 | 231 | 584 | 6,136 | 5.06% | 0 | 0 | 0 |
| Pirate Party | PP | 36 | 430 | 114 | 24 | 42 | 60 | 706 | 0.58% | 0 | 0 | 0 |
| Swedish Senior Citizen Interest Party | SPI | 1 | 210 | 9 | 13 | 3 | 41 | 277 | 0.23% | 0 | 0 | 0 |
| Feminist Initiative | FI | 10 | 126 | 53 | 14 | 12 | 21 | 236 | 0.19% | 0 | 0 | 0 |
| Freedom Party | | 1 | 2 | 2 | 10 | 2 | 0 | 17 | 0.01% | 0 | 0 | 0 |
| National Democrats | ND | 2 | 3 | 4 | 1 | 6 | 1 | 17 | 0.01% | 0 | 0 | 0 |
| Party of the Swedes | SVP | 1 | 9 | 4 | 0 | 0 | 0 | 14 | 0.01% | 0 | 0 | 0 |
| Rural Democrats | | 0 | 1 | 2 | 0 | 0 | 6 | 9 | 0.01% | 0 | 0 | 0 |
| Unity | ENH | 0 | 4 | 0 | 1 | 0 | 2 | 7 | 0.01% | 0 | 0 | 0 |
| Communist Party of Sweden | SKP | 1 | 3 | 2 | 0 | 0 | 0 | 6 | 0.00% | 0 | 0 | 0 |
| Classical Liberal Party | KLP | 0 | 4 | 0 | 0 | 0 | 0 | 4 | 0.00% | 0 | 0 | 0 |
| Active Democracy | | 1 | 1 | 1 | 0 | 0 | 0 | 3 | 0.00% | 0 | 0 | 0 |
| Spirits Party | | 0 | 2 | 0 | 0 | 1 | 0 | 3 | 0.00% | 0 | 0 | 0 |
| Socialist Justice Party | RS | 0 | 2 | 0 | 0 | 0 | 0 | 2 | 0.00% | 0 | 0 | 0 |
| Communist League | KommF | 0 | 1 | 0 | 0 | 0 | 0 | 1 | 0.00% | 0 | 0 | 0 |
| European Workers Party | EAP | 0 | 0 | 1 | 0 | 0 | 0 | 1 | 0.00% | 0 | 0 | 0 |
| Norrländska Coalition | NorrS | 0 | 0 | 1 | 0 | 0 | 0 | 1 | 0.00% | 0 | 0 | 0 |
| Parties not on the ballot | | 4 | 18 | 5 | 0 | 2 | 1 | 30 | 0.02% | 0 | 0 | 0 |
| Valid votes | | 5,468 | 65,193 | 21,770 | 6,427 | 7,443 | 14,886 | 121,187 | 100.00% | 6 | 0 | 6 |
| Blank votes | | 61 | 700 | 271 | 113 | 108 | 194 | 1,447 | 1.18% | | | |
| Rejected votes – other | | 3 | 22 | 8 | 0 | 3 | 3 | 39 | 0.03% | | | |
| Total polled | | 5,532 | 65,915 | 22,049 | 6,540 | 7,554 | 15,083 | 122,673 | 85.08% | | | |
| Registered electors | | 6,315 | 77,883 | 25,742 | 7,836 | 8,799 | 17,611 | 144,186 | | | | |
| Turnout | | 87.60% | 84.63% | 85.65% | 83.46% | 85.85% | 85.65% | 85.08% | | | | |

The following candidates were elected:

- Constituency seats (party mandates) - Ann-Christin Ahlberg (S), 1,131 votes; Phia Andersson (S), 1,316 votes; Jan Ericson (M), 1,221 votes; Ulrik Nilsson (M), 966 votes Hans Olsson (S), 422 votes; and Cecilie Tenfjord-Toftby (M), 1,684 votes.

==== 2000s ====
===== 2006 =====
Results of the 2006 general election held on 17 September 2006:

| Party | | Votes per municipality | | | | | | Total votes | % | Seats | | |
| Party | | Bolle- bygd | Borås | Mark | Svenl- junga | Trane- mo | Ulrice- hamn | Total votes | % | Con. | Lev. | Tot. |
|---|---|---|---|---|---|---|---|---|---|---|---|---|
| Swedish Social Democratic Party | S | 1,676 | 21,911 | 7,851 | 2,083 | 2,612 | 4,296 | 40,429 | 35.69% | 3 | 0 | 3 |
| Moderate Party | M | 1,399 | 15,297 | 4,182 | 1,464 | 1,532 | 3,364 | 27,238 | 24.05% | 2 | 0 | 2 |
| Centre Party | C | 484 | 3,495 | 2,424 | 992 | 1,271 | 2,060 | 10,726 | 9.47% | 1 | 0 | 1 |
| Christian Democrats | KD | 441 | 4,735 | 1,597 | 467 | 473 | 1,380 | 9,093 | 8.03% | 0 | 1 | 1 |
| Liberal People's Party | FP | 342 | 4,342 | 1,093 | 381 | 417 | 798 | 7,373 | 6.51% | 0 | 0 | 0 |
| Left Party | V | 289 | 3,665 | 1,306 | 157 | 256 | 560 | 6,233 | 5.50% | 0 | 0 | 0 |
| Green Party | MP | 182 | 2,544 | 819 | 134 | 222 | 587 | 4,488 | 3.96% | 0 | 0 | 0 |
| Sweden Democrats | SD | 195 | 1,946 | 595 | 177 | 281 | 406 | 3,600 | 3.18% | 0 | 0 | 0 |
| Swedish Senior Citizen Interest Party | SPI | 23 | 1,048 | 137 | 79 | 48 | 332 | 1,667 | 1.47% | 0 | 0 | 0 |
| Pirate Party | PP | 30 | 506 | 144 | 32 | 41 | 75 | 828 | 0.73% | 0 | 0 | 0 |
| June List | | 40 | 359 | 129 | 62 | 28 | 65 | 683 | 0.60% | 0 | 0 | 0 |
| Feminist Initiative | FI | 50 | 209 | 86 | 24 | 25 | 49 | 443 | 0.39% | 0 | 0 | 0 |
| Health Care Party | Sjvåp | 15 | 107 | 91 | 39 | 24 | 22 | 298 | 0.26% | 0 | 0 | 0 |
| National Socialist Front | | 2 | 40 | 11 | 1 | 2 | 1 | 57 | 0.05% | 0 | 0 | 0 |
| Unity | ENH | 1 | 7 | 6 | 1 | 2 | 5 | 22 | 0.02% | 0 | 0 | 0 |
| New Future | NYF | 0 | 9 | 5 | 0 | 0 | 1 | 15 | 0.01% | 0 | 0 | 0 |
| People's Will | | 0 | 7 | 3 | 2 | 0 | 3 | 15 | 0.01% | 0 | 0 | 0 |
| National Democrats | ND | 0 | 6 | 3 | 1 | 1 | 1 | 12 | 0.01% | 0 | 0 | 0 |
| Freedom of the Justice Party | | 0 | 4 | 0 | 0 | 0 | 2 | 6 | 0.01% | 0 | 0 | 0 |
| Active Democracy | | 2 | 1 | 0 | 0 | 0 | 1 | 4 | 0.00% | 0 | 0 | 0 |
| The Communists | KOMM | 0 | 2 | 0 | 0 | 0 | 1 | 3 | 0.00% | 0 | 0 | 0 |
| Socialist Justice Party | RS | 0 | 0 | 2 | 0 | 0 | 0 | 2 | 0.00% | 0 | 0 | 0 |
| Tax Reformists | | 0 | 2 | 0 | 0 | 0 | 0 | 2 | 0.00% | 0 | 0 | 0 |
| Unique Party | | 0 | 1 | 1 | 0 | 0 | 0 | 2 | 0.00% | 0 | 0 | 0 |
| Classical Liberal Party | KLP | 0 | 0 | 0 | 0 | 0 | 1 | 1 | 0.00% | 0 | 0 | 0 |
| Democratic Party of New Swedes | DPNS | 0 | 0 | 0 | 1 | 0 | 0 | 1 | 0.00% | 0 | 0 | 0 |
| Kvinnokraft | | 0 | 1 | 0 | 0 | 0 | 0 | 1 | 0.00% | 0 | 0 | 0 |
| Other parties | | 0 | 14 | 7 | 0 | 3 | 5 | 29 | 0.03% | 0 | 0 | 0 |
| Valid votes | | 5,171 | 60,258 | 20,492 | 6,097 | 7,238 | 14,015 | 113,271 | 100.00% | 6 | 1 | 7 |
| Blank votes | | 95 | 1,037 | 436 | 141 | 142 | 293 | 2,144 | 1.86% | | | |
| Rejected votes – other | | 0 | 29 | 9 | 3 | 2 | 5 | 48 | 0.04% | | | |
| Total polled | | 5,266 | 61,324 | 20,937 | 6,241 | 7,382 | 14,313 | 115,463 | 82.23% | | | |
| Registered electors | | 6,108 | 75,051 | 25,279 | 7,878 | 8,898 | 17,202 | 140,416 | | | | |
| Turnout | | 86.21% | 81.71% | 82.82% | 79.22% | 82.96% | 83.21% | 82.23% | | | | |

The following candidates were elected:

- Constituency seats (personal mandates) - Ulf Sjösten (M), 2,726 votes.
- Constituency seats (party mandates) - Ann-Christin Ahlberg (S), 1,287 votes; Phia Andersson (S), 1,191 votes; Jan Ericson (M), 740 votes; Hans Olsson (S), 455 votes; and Claes Västerteg (C), 643 votes.
- Levelling seats (personal mandates) - Else-Marie Lindgren (KD), 756 votes.

Permanent substitutions:

- Ulf Sjösten (M) resigned on 29 September 2008 and was replaced by Cecilie Tenfjord-Toftby (M) on 30 September 2008.

===== 2002 =====
Results of the 2002 general election held on 15 September 2002:

| Party | | Votes per municipality | | | | | | Total votes | % | Seats | | |
| Party | | Bolle- bygd | Borås | Mark | Svenl- junga | Trane- mo | Ulrice- hamn | Total votes | % | Con. | Lev. | Tot. |
|---|---|---|---|---|---|---|---|---|---|---|---|---|
| Swedish Social Democratic Party | S | 1,783 | 24,512 | 8,362 | 2,310 | 3,030 | 4,825 | 44,822 | 40.94% | 3 | 0 | 3 |
| Moderate Party | M | 796 | 8,815 | 2,170 | 827 | 882 | 1,728 | 15,218 | 13.90% | 1 | 0 | 1 |
| Christian Democrats | KD | 667 | 6,786 | 2,360 | 769 | 849 | 2,115 | 13,546 | 12.37% | 1 | 0 | 1 |
| Liberal People's Party | FP | 522 | 6,753 | 1,851 | 626 | 641 | 1,558 | 11,951 | 10.92% | 1 | 0 | 1 |
| Centre Party | C | 371 | 2,510 | 2,054 | 918 | 1,112 | 1,825 | 8,790 | 8.03% | 0 | 1 | 1 |
| Left Party | V | 336 | 4,747 | 1,588 | 292 | 359 | 866 | 8,188 | 7.48% | 0 | 0 | 0 |
| Green Party | MP | 214 | 2,221 | 798 | 200 | 239 | 552 | 4,224 | 3.86% | 0 | 0 | 0 |
| Sweden Democrats | SD | 70 | 876 | 205 | 54 | 65 | 71 | 1,341 | 1.23% | 0 | 0 | 0 |
| Swedish Senior Citizen Interest Party | SPI | 7 | 716 | 74 | 32 | 17 | 186 | 1,032 | 0.94% | 0 | 0 | 0 |
| New Future | NYF | 9 | 98 | 43 | 6 | 0 | 1 | 157 | 0.14% | 0 | 0 | 0 |
| Unity | ENH | 0 | 3 | 4 | 0 | 0 | 0 | 7 | 0.01% | 0 | 0 | 0 |
| The Communists | KOMM | 0 | 4 | 2 | 0 | 0 | 0 | 6 | 0.01% | 0 | 0 | 0 |
| Socialist Justice Party | RS | 0 | 4 | 0 | 0 | 0 | 0 | 4 | 0.00% | 0 | 0 | 0 |
| Socialist Party | SOC.P | 0 | 0 | 4 | 0 | 0 | 0 | 4 | 0.00% | 0 | 0 | 0 |
| European Workers Party | EAP | 0 | 1 | 2 | 0 | 0 | 0 | 3 | 0.00% | 0 | 0 | 0 |
| Other parties | | 10 | 79 | 42 | 11 | 6 | 28 | 176 | 0.16% | 0 | 0 | 0 |
| Valid votes | | 4,785 | 58,125 | 19,559 | 6,045 | 7,200 | 13,755 | 109,469 | 100.00% | 6 | 1 | 7 |
| Rejected votes | | 84 | 1,029 | 428 | 133 | 152 | 260 | 2,086 | 1.87% | | | |
| Total polled | | 4,869 | 59,154 | 19,987 | 6,178 | 7,352 | 14,015 | 111,555 | 81.23% | | | |
| Registered electors | | 5,770 | 73,198 | 24,594 | 7,856 | 8,853 | 17,067 | 137,338 | | | | |
| Turnout | | 84.38% | 80.81% | 81.27% | 78.64% | 83.05% | 82.12% | 81.23% | | | | |

The following candidates were elected:

- Constituency seats (personal mandates) - Else-Marie Lindgren (KD), 1,321 votes; and Ulf Sjösten (M), 2,449 votes.
- Constituency seats (party mandates) - Berndt Ekholm (S), 922 votes; Anne-Marie Ekström (FP), 774 votes; Sonja Fransson (S), 1,555 votes; and Arne Kjörnsberg (S), 3,055 votes.
- Levelling seats (personal mandates) - Claes Västerteg (C), 776 votes.

Permanent substitutions:

- Sonja Fransson (S) resigned on 31 July 2006 and was replaced by Ann-Christin Ahlberg (S) on 1 August 2006.

==== 1990s ====
===== 1998 =====
Results of the 1998 general election held on 20 September 1998:

| Party | | Votes per municipality | | | | | | Total votes | % | Seats | | |
| Party | | Bolle- bygd | Borås | Mark | Svenl- junga | Trane- mo | Ulrice- hamn | Total votes | % | Con. | Lev. | Tot. |
|---|---|---|---|---|---|---|---|---|---|---|---|---|
| Swedish Social Democratic Party | S | 1,654 | 21,248 | 7,677 | 2,186 | 2,805 | 4,221 | 39,791 | 36.24% | 3 | 0 | 3 |
| Moderate Party | M | 1,131 | 12,220 | 3,325 | 1,302 | 1,396 | 2,770 | 22,144 | 20.17% | 1 | 0 | 1 |
| Christian Democrats | KD | 764 | 8,297 | 2,953 | 1,044 | 1,005 | 2,712 | 16,775 | 15.28% | 1 | 0 | 1 |
| Left Party | V | 516 | 7,430 | 2,524 | 556 | 519 | 1,174 | 12,719 | 11.58% | 1 | 0 | 1 |
| Centre Party | C | 323 | 2,223 | 1,820 | 773 | 1,024 | 1,618 | 7,781 | 7.09% | 0 | 0 | 0 |
| Green Party | MP | 253 | 2,682 | 852 | 238 | 330 | 724 | 5,079 | 4.63% | 0 | 0 | 0 |
| Liberal People's Party | FP | 137 | 2,390 | 482 | 229 | 256 | 510 | 4,004 | 3.65% | 0 | 0 | 0 |
| Other parties | | 91 | 855 | 234 | 70 | 50 | 200 | 1,500 | 1.37% | 0 | 0 | 0 |
| Valid votes | | 4,869 | 57,345 | 19,867 | 6,398 | 7,385 | 13,929 | 109,793 | 100.00% | 6 | 0 | 6 |
| Rejected votes | | 103 | 1,323 | 477 | 173 | 199 | 334 | 2,609 | 2.32% | | | |
| Total polled | | 4,972 | 58,668 | 20,344 | 6,571 | 7,584 | 14,263 | 112,402 | 82.72% | | | |
| Registered electors | | 5,750 | 71,441 | 24,562 | 8,098 | 8,973 | 17,059 | 135,883 | | | | |
| Turnout | | 86.47% | 82.12% | 82.83% | 81.14% | 84.52% | 83.61% | 82.72% | | | | |

The following candidates were elected:

- Constituency seats (personal mandates) - Lars Björkman (M), 2,310 votes.
- Constituency seats (party mandates) - Berndt Ekholm (S), 1,253 votes; Kjell Eldensjö (KD), 320 votes; Sonja Fransson (S), 1,873 votes; Arne Kjörnsberg (S), 2,651 votes; and Jonas Ringqvist (V), 79 votes.

===== 1994 =====
Results of the 1994 general election held on 18 September 1994:

| Party | | Votes per municipality | | | | | | Total votes | % | Seats | | |
| Party | | Bolle- bygd | Borås | Mark | Svenl- junga | Trane- mo | Ulrice- hamn | Total votes | % | Con. | Lev. | Tot. |
|---|---|---|---|---|---|---|---|---|---|---|---|---|
| Swedish Social Democratic Party | S | 2,225 | 29,620 | 10,457 | 2,808 | 3,362 | 5,282 | 53,754 | 45.59% | 3 | 0 | 3 |
| Moderate Party | M | 1,201 | 13,589 | 3,776 | 1,528 | 1,635 | 3,273 | 25,002 | 21.20% | 2 | 0 | 2 |
| Centre Party | C | 545 | 4,065 | 2,867 | 1,302 | 1,480 | 2,504 | 12,763 | 10.82% | 1 | 0 | 1 |
| Liberal People's Party | FP | 269 | 4,115 | 945 | 432 | 458 | 1,030 | 7,249 | 6.15% | 0 | 0 | 0 |
| Green Party | MP | 277 | 2,985 | 997 | 353 | 378 | 1,039 | 6,029 | 5.11% | 0 | 0 | 0 |
| Left Party | V | 254 | 3,486 | 1,193 | 213 | 225 | 590 | 5,961 | 5.06% | 0 | 0 | 0 |
| Christian Democratic Unity | KDS | 278 | 2,539 | 1,002 | 296 | 318 | 939 | 5,372 | 4.56% | 0 | 0 | 0 |
| New Democracy | NyD | 64 | 677 | 181 | 71 | 86 | 198 | 1,277 | 1.08% | 0 | 0 | 0 |
| Other parties | | 32 | 274 | 99 | 21 | 18 | 67 | 511 | 0.43% | 0 | 0 | 0 |
| Valid votes | | 5,145 | 61,350 | 21,517 | 7,024 | 7,960 | 14,922 | 117,918 | 100.00% | 6 | 0 | 6 |
| Rejected votes | | 74 | 941 | 364 | 158 | 160 | 296 | 1,993 | 1.66% | | | |
| Total polled | | 5,219 | 62,291 | 21,881 | 7,182 | 8,120 | 15,218 | 119,911 | 88.24% | | | |
| Registered electors | | 5,783 | 70,975 | 24,571 | 8,284 | 9,044 | 17,228 | 135,885 | | | | |
| Turnout | | 90.25% | 87.76% | 89.05% | 86.70% | 89.78% | 88.33% | 88.24% | | | | |

The following candidates were elected: Lars Björkman (M); Lennart Brunander (C); Berndt Ekholm (S); Sonja Fransson (S); Arne Kjörnsberg (S); and Birgitta Wichne (M).

===== 1991 =====
Results of the 1991 general election held on 15 September 1991:

| Party | | Votes per municipality | | | | | Total votes | % | Seats | | |
| Party | | Borås | Mark | Svenl- junga | Trane- mo | Ulrice- hamn | Total votes | % | Con. | Lev. | Tot. |
|---|---|---|---|---|---|---|---|---|---|---|---|
| Swedish Social Democratic Party | S | 25,901 | 8,684 | 2,153 | 2,846 | 4,126 | 43,710 | 37.21% | 3 | 0 | 3 |
| Moderate Party | M | 14,554 | 3,622 | 1,462 | 1,502 | 2,969 | 24,109 | 20.52% | 2 | 0 | 2 |
| Centre Party | C | 4,778 | 3,057 | 1,444 | 1,513 | 2,715 | 13,507 | 11.50% | 1 | 0 | 1 |
| Christian Democratic Unity | KDS | 6,286 | 1,910 | 637 | 676 | 1,881 | 11,390 | 9.70% | 1 | 0 | 1 |
| Liberal People's Party | FP | 5,851 | 1,339 | 575 | 610 | 1,266 | 9,641 | 8.21% | 0 | 1 | 1 |
| New Democracy | NyD | 3,766 | 1,302 | 503 | 468 | 1,135 | 7,174 | 6.11% | 0 | 0 | 0 |
| Left Party | V | 2,533 | 756 | 122 | 137 | 317 | 3,865 | 3.29% | 0 | 0 | 0 |
| Green Party | MP | 1,810 | 573 | 189 | 184 | 503 | 3,259 | 2.77% | 0 | 0 | 0 |
| Other parties | | 595 | 100 | 32 | 26 | 67 | 820 | 0.70% | 0 | 0 | 0 |
| Valid votes | | 66,074 | 21,343 | 7,117 | 7,962 | 14,979 | 117,475 | 100.00% | 7 | 1 | 8 |
| Rejected votes | | 1,055 | 377 | 133 | 150 | 241 | 1,956 | 1.64% | | | |
| Total polled | | 67,129 | 21,720 | 7,250 | 8,112 | 15,220 | 119,431 | 88.49% | | | |
| Registered electors | | 76,241 | 24,313 | 8,300 | 9,011 | 17,101 | 134,966 | | | | |
| Turnout | | 88.05% | 89.33% | 87.35% | 90.02% | 89.00% | 88.49% | | | | |

The following candidates were elected: Lennart Brunander (C); Lars Björkman (M); Berndt Ekholm (S); Kjell Eldensjö (KDS); Lahja Exner (S); Arne Kjörnsberg (S); Hans Nyhage (M); and Lars Sundin (FP).

==== 1980s ====
===== 1988 =====
Results of the 1988 general election held on 18 September 1988:

| Party | | Votes per municipality | | | | | Total votes | % | Seats | | |
| Party | | Borås | Mark | Svenl- junga | Trane- mo | Ulrice- hamn | Total votes | % | Con. | Lev. | Tot. |
|---|---|---|---|---|---|---|---|---|---|---|---|
| Swedish Social Democratic Party | S | 29,827 | 9,652 | 2,510 | 3,212 | 4,891 | 50,092 | 43.12% | 3 | 0 | 3 |
| Moderate Party | M | 12,560 | 3,083 | 1,287 | 1,253 | 2,740 | 20,923 | 18.01% | 1 | 0 | 1 |
| Centre Party | C | 6,561 | 3,707 | 1,735 | 1,954 | 3,475 | 17,432 | 15.01% | 1 | 0 | 1 |
| Liberal People's Party | FP | 7,908 | 1,755 | 718 | 766 | 1,823 | 12,970 | 11.16% | 1 | 0 | 1 |
| Green Party | MP | 3,263 | 1,066 | 396 | 363 | 802 | 5,890 | 5.07% | 0 | 0 | 0 |
| Left Party – Communists | VPK | 3,033 | 877 | 172 | 193 | 298 | 4,573 | 3.94% | 0 | 0 | 0 |
| Christian Democratic Unity | KDS | 2,474 | 677 | 222 | 185 | 639 | 4,197 | 3.61% | 0 | 0 | 0 |
| Other parties | | 55 | 12 | 2 | 4 | 23 | 96 | 0.08% | 0 | 0 | 0 |
| Valid votes | | 65,681 | 20,829 | 7,042 | 7,930 | 14,691 | 116,173 | 100.00% | 6 | 0 | 6 |
| Rejected votes | | 576 | 212 | 77 | 96 | 159 | 1,120 | 0.95% | | | |
| Total polled | | 66,257 | 21,041 | 7,119 | 8,026 | 14,850 | 117,293 | 87.98% | | | |
| Registered electors | | 75,640 | 23,713 | 8,180 | 8,916 | 16,873 | 133,322 | | | | |
| Turnout | | 87.60% | 88.73% | 87.03% | 90.02% | 88.01% | 87.98% | | | | |

The following candidates were elected: Lennart Brunander (C); Berndt Ekholm (S); Lahja Exner (S); Arne Kjörnsberg (S); Hans Nyhage (M); and Lars Sundin (FP).

===== 1985 =====
Results of the 1985 general election held on 15 September 1985:

| Party | | Votes per municipality | | | | | Total votes | % | Seats | | |
| Party | | Borås | Mark | Svenl- junga | Trane- mo | Ulrice- hamn | Total votes | % | Con. | Lev. | Tot. |
|---|---|---|---|---|---|---|---|---|---|---|---|
| Swedish Social Democratic Party | S | 30,052 | 9,898 | 2,426 | 3,279 | 4,803 | 50,458 | 42.02% | 3 | 0 | 3 |
| Moderate Party | M | 15,477 | 3,941 | 1,729 | 1,547 | 3,446 | 26,140 | 21.77% | 2 | 0 | 2 |
| Centre Party | C | 8,015 | 4,286 | 1,946 | 2,100 | 4,127 | 20,474 | 17.05% | 1 | 0 | 1 |
| Liberal People's Party | FP | 10,383 | 2,256 | 958 | 992 | 2,249 | 16,838 | 14.02% | 1 | 0 | 1 |
| Left Party – Communists | VPK | 3,031 | 813 | 146 | 157 | 328 | 4,475 | 3.73% | 0 | 0 | 0 |
| Green Party | MP | 694 | 235 | 113 | 75 | 249 | 1,366 | 1.14% | 0 | 0 | 0 |
| Other parties | | 247 | 29 | 11 | 11 | 27 | 325 | 0.27% | 0 | 0 | 0 |
| Valid votes | | 67,899 | 21,458 | 7,329 | 8,161 | 15,229 | 120,076 | 100.00% | 7 | 0 | 7 |
| Rejected votes | | 473 | 156 | 75 | 83 | 131 | 918 | 0.76% | | | |
| Total polled | | 68,372 | 21,614 | 7,404 | 8,244 | 15,360 | 120,994 | 91.50% | | | |
| Registered electors | | 75,039 | 23,449 | 8,121 | 8,903 | 16,715 | 132,227 | | | | |
| Turnout | | 91.12% | 92.17% | 91.17% | 92.60% | 91.89% | 91.50% | | | | |

The following candidates were elected: Lennart Brunander (C); Berndt Ekholm (S); Lahja Exner (S); Arne Kjörnsberg (S); Hans Nyhage (M); Lars Sundin (FP); and Arne Svensson (M).

===== 1982 =====
Results of the 1982 general election held on 19 September 1982:

| Party | | Votes per municipality | | | | | Total votes | % | Seats | | |
| Party | | Borås | Mark | Svenl- junga | Trane- mo | Ulrice- hamn | Total votes | % | Con. | Lev. | Tot. |
|---|---|---|---|---|---|---|---|---|---|---|---|
| Swedish Social Democratic Party | S | 30,645 | 9,689 | 2,463 | 3,255 | 4,720 | 50,772 | 42.18% | 3 | 0 | 3 |
| Moderate Party | M | 18,258 | 4,381 | 1,985 | 1,736 | 3,958 | 30,318 | 25.19% | 2 | 0 | 2 |
| Centre Party | C | 9,777 | 4,913 | 2,234 | 2,379 | 4,438 | 23,741 | 19.72% | 2 | 0 | 2 |
| Liberal People's Party | FP | 4,082 | 833 | 339 | 408 | 1,125 | 6,787 | 5.64% | 0 | 0 | 0 |
| Left Party – Communists | VPK | 3,164 | 850 | 147 | 149 | 292 | 4,602 | 3.82% | 0 | 0 | 0 |
| Christian Democratic Unity | KDS | 1,233 | 367 | 136 | 119 | 484 | 2,339 | 1.94% | 0 | 0 | 0 |
| Green Party | MP | 973 | 292 | 87 | 102 | 248 | 1,702 | 1.41% | 0 | 0 | 0 |
| K-Party | K-P | 25 | 3 | 0 | 0 | 0 | 28 | 0.02% | 0 | 0 | 0 |
| Other parties | | 47 | 12 | 9 | 3 | 16 | 87 | 0.07% | 0 | 0 | 0 |
| Valid votes | | 68,204 | 21,340 | 7,400 | 8,151 | 15,281 | 120,376 | 100.00% | 7 | 0 | 7 |
| Rejected votes | | 550 | 156 | 66 | 98 | 103 | 973 | 0.80% | | | |
| Total polled | | 68,754 | 21,496 | 7,466 | 8,249 | 15,384 | 121,349 | 92.89% | | | |
| Registered electors | | 74,318 | 22,981 | 8,066 | 8,790 | 16,480 | 130,635 | | | | |
| Turnout | | 92.51% | 93.54% | 92.56% | 93.85% | 93.35% | 92.89% | | | | |

The following candidates were elected: Lennart Brunander (C); Rune Carlstein (S); Lahja Exner (S); Inger Josefsson (C); Hans Nyhage (M); Gunnar Sträng (S); and Arne Svensson (M).

==== 1970s ====
===== 1979 =====
Results of the 1979 general election held on 16 September 1979:

| Party | | Votes per municipality | | | | | Total votes | % | Seats | | |
| Party | | Borås | Mark | Svenl- junga | Trane- mo | Ulrice- hamn | Total votes | % | Con. | Lev. | Tot. |
|---|---|---|---|---|---|---|---|---|---|---|---|
| Swedish Social Democratic Party | S | 28,787 | 9,177 | 2,249 | 3,065 | 4,282 | 47,560 | 40.02% | 3 | 0 | 3 |
| Centre Party | C | 11,255 | 5,450 | 2,454 | 2,620 | 4,893 | 26,672 | 22.44% | 2 | 0 | 2 |
| Moderate Party | M | 15,959 | 3,901 | 1,665 | 1,404 | 3,490 | 26,419 | 22.23% | 2 | 0 | 2 |
| Liberal People's Party | FP | 7,444 | 1,355 | 563 | 670 | 1,760 | 11,792 | 9.92% | 0 | 1 | 1 |
| Left Party – Communists | VPK | 2,924 | 856 | 100 | 166 | 298 | 4,344 | 3.66% | 0 | 0 | 0 |
| Christian Democratic Unity | KDS | 930 | 256 | 125 | 86 | 322 | 1,719 | 1.45% | 0 | 0 | 0 |
| Communist Party of Sweden | SKP | 40 | 6 | 0 | 2 | 4 | 52 | 0.04% | 0 | 0 | 0 |
| Workers' Party – The Communists | APK | 37 | 0 | 0 | 0 | 0 | 37 | 0.03% | 0 | 0 | 0 |
| Other parties | | 154 | 15 | 8 | 19 | 43 | 239 | 0.20% | 0 | 0 | 0 |
| Valid votes | | 67,530 | 21,016 | 7,164 | 8,032 | 15,092 | 118,834 | 100.00% | 7 | 1 | 8 |
| Rejected votes | | 217 | 93 | 31 | 28 | 42 | 411 | 0.34% | | | |
| Total polled | | 67,747 | 21,109 | 7,195 | 8,060 | 15,134 | 119,245 | 92.49% | | | |
| Registered electors | | 73,795 | 22,566 | 7,753 | 8,553 | 16,256 | 128,923 | | | | |
| Turnout | | 91.80% | 93.54% | 92.80% | 94.24% | 93.10% | 92.49% | | | | |

The following candidates were elected: Lennart Brunander (C); Rune Carlstein (S); Lahja Exner (S); Wilhelm Gustafsson (FP); Hans Nyhage (M); Maj Pehrsson (C); Gunnar Sträng (S); and Arne Svensson (M).

===== 1976 =====
Results of the 1976 general election held on 19 September 1976:

| Party | | Votes per municipality | | | | | Total votes | % | Seats | | |
| Party | | Borås | Mark | Svenl- junga | Trane- mo | Ulrice- hamn | Total votes | % | Con. | Lev. | Tot. |
|---|---|---|---|---|---|---|---|---|---|---|---|
| Swedish Social Democratic Party | S | 28,274 | 8,857 | 2,187 | 2,875 | 3,981 | 46,174 | 38.94% | 3 | 0 | 3 |
| Centre Party | C | 15,697 | 6,393 | 2,813 | 2,959 | 5,872 | 33,734 | 28.45% | 2 | 0 | 2 |
| Moderate Party | M | 13,578 | 3,304 | 1,403 | 1,155 | 3,027 | 22,467 | 18.95% | 1 | 1 | 2 |
| People's Party | F | 7,189 | 1,180 | 468 | 653 | 1,684 | 11,174 | 9.42% | 1 | 0 | 1 |
| Left Party – Communists | VPK | 2,431 | 648 | 65 | 101 | 199 | 3,444 | 2.90% | 0 | 0 | 0 |
| Christian Democratic Unity | KDS | 794 | 200 | 90 | 84 | 263 | 1,431 | 1.21% | 0 | 0 | 0 |
| Communist Party of Sweden | SKP | 113 | 6 | 2 | 1 | 10 | 132 | 0.11% | 0 | 0 | 0 |
| Other parties | | 31 | 0 | 0 | 0 | 0 | 31 | 0.03% | 0 | 0 | 0 |
| Valid votes | | 68,107 | 20,588 | 7,028 | 7,828 | 15,036 | 118,587 | 100.00% | 7 | 1 | 8 |
| Rejected votes | | 143 | 39 | 8 | 21 | 26 | 237 | 0.20% | | | |
| Total polled | | 68,250 | 20,627 | 7,036 | 7,849 | 15,062 | 118,824 | 93.55% | | | |
| Registered electors | | 73,341 | 21,858 | 7,513 | 8,265 | 16,034 | 127,011 | | | | |
| Turnout | | 93.06% | 94.37% | 93.65% | 94.97% | 93.94% | 93.55% | | | | |

The following candidates were elected: Rune Carlstein (S); Wilhelm Gustafsson (F); Gördis Hörnlund (S); Tage Magnusson (M); Hans Nyhage (M); Maj Pehrsson (C); Arne Persson (C); and Gunnar Sträng (S).

===== 1973 =====
Results of the 1973 general election held on 16 September 1973:

| Party | | Votes per municipality | | | | | Total votes | % | Seats | | |
| Party | | Borås | Mark | Svenl- junga | Trane- mo | Ulrice- hamn | Total votes | % | Con. | Lev. | Tot. |
|---|---|---|---|---|---|---|---|---|---|---|---|
| Swedish Social Democratic Party | S | 27,649 | 8,480 | 2,040 | 2,670 | 3,902 | 44,741 | 39.44% | 3 | 0 | 3 |
| Centre Party | C | 15,756 | 5,925 | 2,697 | 2,903 | 5,593 | 32,874 | 28.98% | 2 | 0 | 2 |
| Moderate Party | M | 12,850 | 3,275 | 1,288 | 1,099 | 2,873 | 21,385 | 18.85% | 2 | 0 | 2 |
| People's Party | F | 5,470 | 796 | 370 | 542 | 1,433 | 8,611 | 7.59% | 0 | 0 | 0 |
| Left Party – Communists | VPK | 2,708 | 698 | 52 | 92 | 158 | 3,708 | 3.27% | 0 | 0 | 0 |
| Christian Democratic Unity | KDS | 1,046 | 252 | 95 | 53 | 336 | 1,782 | 1.57% | 0 | 0 | 0 |
| Communist League Marxist–Leninists (the revolutionaries) | KFML(r) | 147 | 23 | 1 | 7 | 18 | 196 | 0.17% | 0 | 0 | 0 |
| Communist Party of Sweden | SKP | 114 | 12 | 0 | 0 | 4 | 130 | 0.11% | 0 | 0 | 0 |
| Other parties | | 18 | 2 | 1 | 0 | 2 | 23 | 0.02% | 0 | 0 | 0 |
| Valid votes | | 65,758 | 19,463 | 6,544 | 7,366 | 14,319 | 113,450 | 100.00% | 7 | 0 | 7 |
| Rejected votes | | 61 | 15 | 4 | 5 | 16 | 101 | 0.09% | | | |
| Total polled | | 65,819 | 19,478 | 6,548 | 7,371 | 14,335 | 113,551 | 93.04% | | | |
| Registered electors | | 71,128 | 20,771 | 7,028 | 7,771 | 15,346 | 122,044 | | | | |
| Turnout | | 92.54% | 93.77% | 93.17% | 94.85% | 93.41% | 93.04% | | | | |

The following candidates were elected: Rune Carlstein (S); Gördis Hörnlund (S); Tage Magnusson (M); Hans Nyhage (M); Maj Pehrsson (C); Arne Persson (C); and Gunnar Sträng (S).

===== 1970 =====
Results of the 1970 general election held on 20 September 1970:

| Party | | Votes per municipality | | | | | | | | | | | | | | | Total votes | % | Seats | | |
| Party | | Åsun- den | Bolle- bygd | Borås | Dalsjö- fors | Dals- torp | Fristad | Höke- rum | Mark | Redväg | Sand- hult | Svenl- junga | Trane- mo | Ulrice- hamn | Viska- fors | Postal votes | Total votes | % | Con. | Lev. | Tot. |
|---|---|---|---|---|---|---|---|---|---|---|---|---|---|---|---|---|---|---|---|---|---|
| Swedish Social Democratic Party | S | 873 | 1,176 | 17,912 | 2,119 | 508 | 996 | 281 | 7,841 | 605 | 1,286 | 1,869 | 1,970 | 1,816 | 1,841 | 3,556 | 44,649 | 39.91% | 3 | 0 | 3 |
| Centre Party | C | 1,180 | 822 | 5,543 | 1,417 | 927 | 1,140 | 871 | 4,856 | 1,795 | 1,089 | 2,230 | 1,484 | 983 | 800 | 1,933 | 27,070 | 24.20% | 2 | 0 | 2 |
| Moderate Party | M | 491 | 637 | 6,168 | 798 | 291 | 763 | 511 | 2,775 | 709 | 686 | 1,192 | 633 | 791 | 265 | 3,242 | 19,952 | 17.83% | 1 | 0 | 1 |
| People's Party | F | 315 | 310 | 6,231 | 566 | 204 | 490 | 195 | 1,270 | 680 | 536 | 509 | 461 | 943 | 157 | 2,416 | 15,283 | 13.66% | 1 | 0 | 1 |
| Left Party – Communists | VPK | 11 | 54 | 1,730 | 75 | 16 | 98 | 20 | 563 | 17 | 111 | 37 | 60 | 40 | 89 | 294 | 3,215 | 2.87% | 0 | 0 | 0 |
| Christian Democratic Unity | KDS | 31 | 32 | 356 | 90 | 7 | 38 | 23 | 196 | 175 | 38 | 59 | 19 | 114 | 10 | 188 | 1,376 | 1.23% | 0 | 0 | 0 |
| Communist League Marxists-Leninists | KFML | 0 | 3 | 198 | 7 | 0 | 3 | 0 | 20 | 2 | 9 | 2 | 1 | 17 | 2 | 67 | 331 | 0.30% | 0 | 0 | 0 |
| Other parties | | 0 | 0 | 0 | 0 | 0 | 0 | 0 | 0 | 0 | 0 | 0 | 0 | 0 | 0 | 1 | 1 | 0.00% | 0 | 0 | 0 |
| Valid votes | | 2,901 | 3,034 | 38,138 | 5,072 | 1,953 | 3,528 | 1,901 | 17,521 | 3,983 | 3,755 | 5,898 | 4,628 | 4,704 | 3,164 | 11,697 | 111,877 | 100.00% | 7 | 0 | 7 |
| Rejected votes | | 4 | 4 | 21 | 8 | 1 | 0 | 0 | 2 | 1 | 0 | 5 | 3 | 0 | 0 | 38 | 87 | 0.08% | | | |
| Total polled | | 2,905 | 3,038 | 38,159 | 5,080 | 1,954 | 3,528 | 1,901 | 17,523 | 3,984 | 3,755 | 5,903 | 4,631 | 4,704 | 3,164 | 11,735 | 111,964 | | | | |
| Postal Votes | | 217 | 209 | 6,328 | 291 | 167 | 424 | 88 | 1,318 | 289 | 394 | 445 | 420 | 746 | 335 | -11,735 | -64 | | | | |
| Total polled | | 3,122 | 3,247 | 44,487 | 5,371 | 2,121 | 3,952 | 1,989 | 18,841 | 4,273 | 4,149 | 6,348 | 5,051 | 5,450 | 3,499 | 0 | 111,900 | 91.05% | | | |
| Registered electors | | 3,352 | 3,561 | 49,618 | 5,755 | 2,253 | 4,279 | 2,137 | 20,473 | 4,661 | 4,497 | 7,040 | 5,475 | 6,097 | 3,708 | | 122,906 | | | | |
| Turnout | | 93.14% | 91.18% | 89.66% | 93.33% | 94.14% | 92.36% | 93.07% | 92.03% | 91.68% | 92.26% | 90.17% | 92.26% | 89.39% | 94.36% | | 91.05% | | | | |

The following candidates were elected: Rune Carlstein (S); Gudmund Ernulf (F); Gördis Hörnlund (S); Tage Magnusson (M); Maj Pehrsson (C); Arne Persson (C); and Gunnar Sträng (S).
