= Petter Löberg =

Politician and Member of the parliament of Sweden

Petter Löberg S
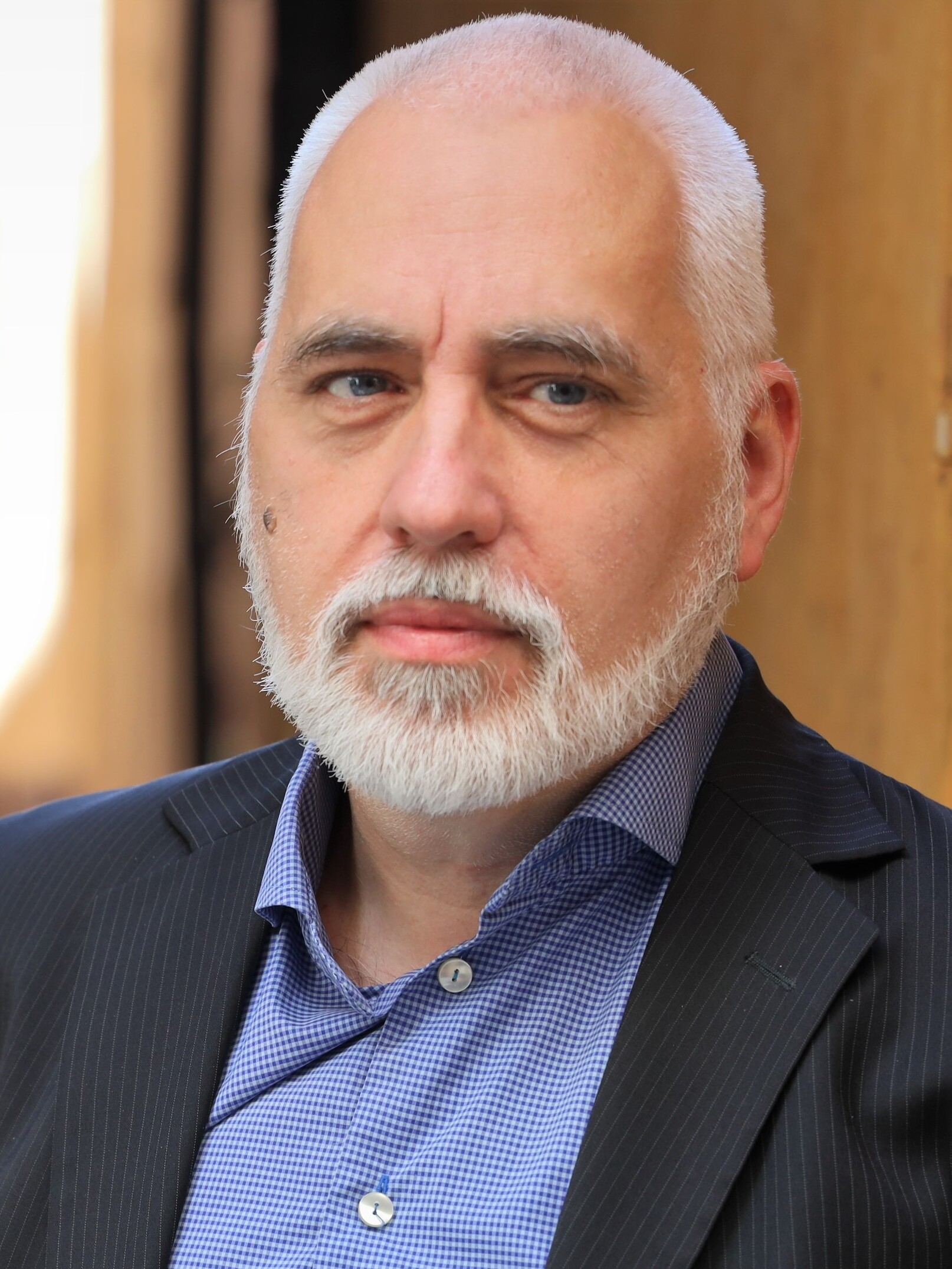

Member of the Swedish Parliament for Västra Götaland County South
- Incumbent
- Assumed office 29 September 2014

Personal details
- Born: 17 August 1968 (age 58) Borås, Älvsborg County, Sweden
- Party: Social Democratic Party
- Parents: Jan-Erik Löberg; Britt-Marie (née Rundberg)
- Education: University of Gothenburg
- Profession: Politician, teacher

Petter Löberg (born 17 August 1968) is a Swedish politician and member of the Riksdag for the Swedish Social Democratic Party. He is currently taking up seat number 43 in the Riksdag for the constituency of Västra Götaland County South. Since 2014 he has been a member of the Committee on Justice.

Löberg started his political career in the Swedish Social Democratic Youth League in the 80s. He later became a member of the municipal council for his home municipality of Borås. He is vice chairman of the Street Committee and a member of the municipal board. During February and March 2010 he was a substitute for Phia Andersson for the constituency of Västra Götaland County South. He has been a full member of the Riksdag since the 2014 general election.
