= Ingemar Kihlström =

Swedish politician (born 1966)

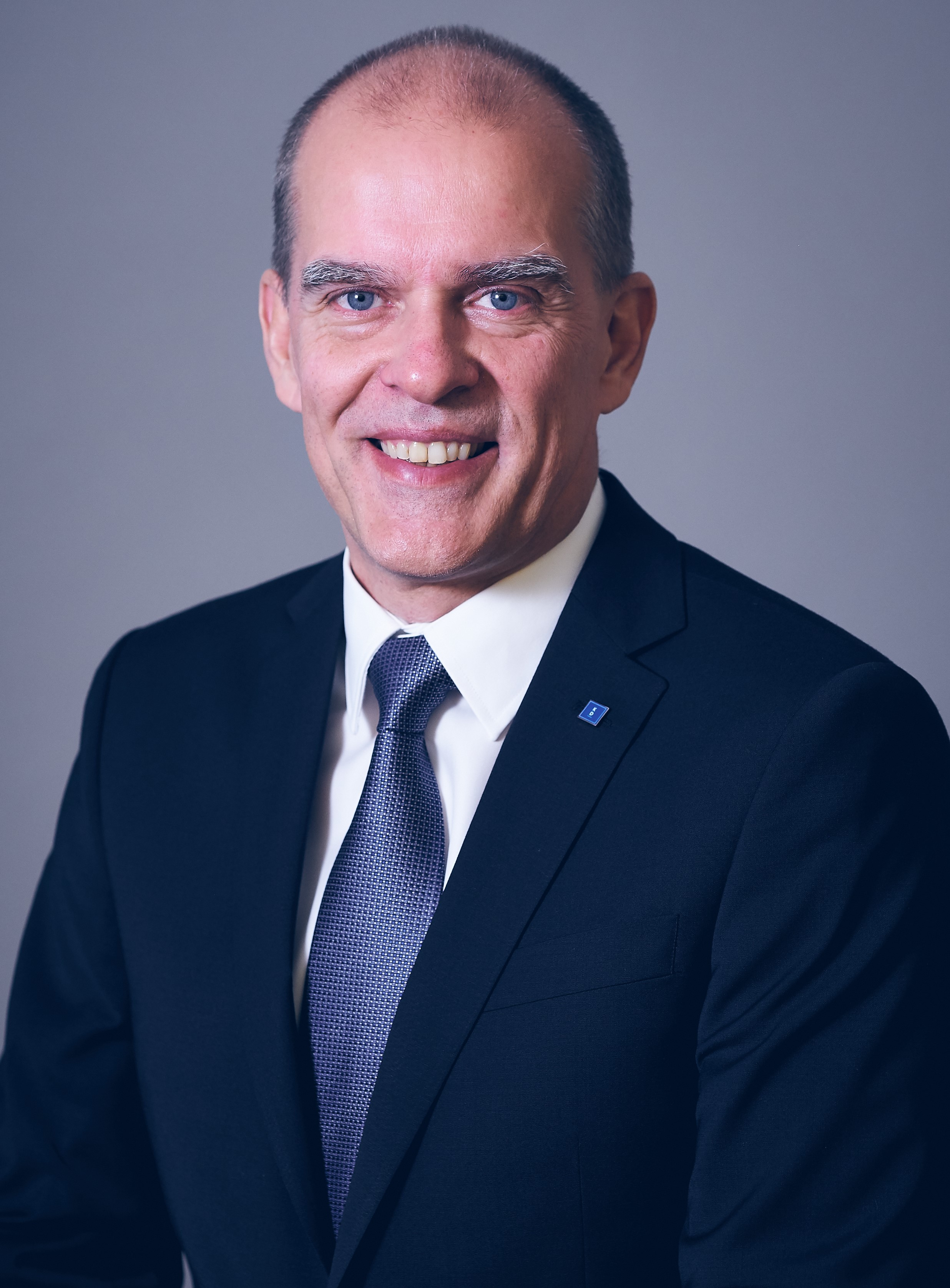
- Ingemar Kihlström in 2018

Member of the Riksdag
- Incumbent
- Assumed office 2018
- Constituency: Västra Götaland County South

Personal details
- Born: 1966 (age 59–60)
- Party: Christian Democrats

Johan Tore Ingemar Kihlström (born 1966) is a Swedish politician from the Christian Democrats. He has been a member of the Riksdag since 2018. He was re-elected in 2022. He was Deputy Chairman of the Committee on Justice. He is a candidate in the 2026 Swedish general election.

== See also ==
- List of members of the Riksdag, 2018–2022
- List of members of the Riksdag, 2022–2026
