= Sonja Fransson =

Swedish politician (born 1949)

Member of the Riksdag
- In office 3 October 1994 – 31 July 2006
- Succeeded by: Ann-Christin Ahlberg
- Constituency: Västra Götaland County South

Personal details
- Born: 1949 (age 76–77)
- Party: Social Democratic Party

Sonja Ingrid Mildred Fransson (born 1949) is a Swedish politician and former member of the Riksdag, the national legislature. A member of the Social Democratic Party, she represented Västra Götaland County South between October 1994 and July 2006.
