= Marbäck =

- Location within Västra Götaland Location within Sweden
- Coordinates: 57°45′N 13°25′E
- Country: Sweden
- Province: Västergötland
- County: Västra Götaland County
- Municipality: Ulricehamn Municipality

Area
  - Total: 0.63 km^{2} (0.24 sq mi)

Population (31 December 2010)
  - Total: 474
  - Density: 755/km^{2} (1,960/sq mi)
- Time zone: UTC+1 (CET)
  - Summer (DST): UTC+2 (CEST)
- Climate: Dfb

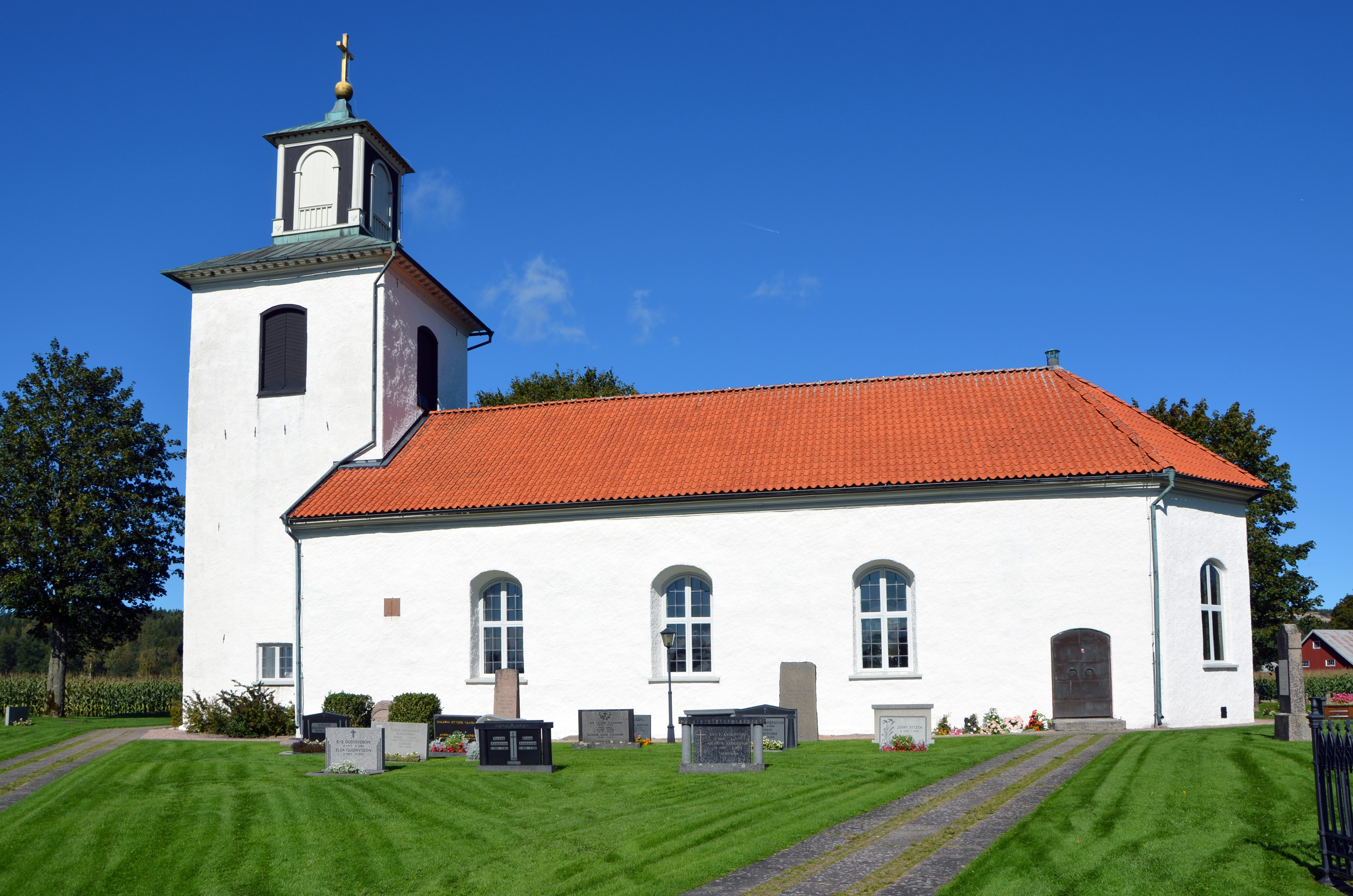
Marbäck Church, located in Marbäck, Västra Götaland County, Sweden, part of the Diocese of Skara. The church features traditional Swedish architectural design and serves the local community.

Marbäck (Swedish pronunciation: [ˈmârːbɛk]) is a locality situated in Ulricehamn Municipality, Västra Götaland County, Sweden with 474 inhabitants in 2010.
