= Annelie Hastig Olsson =

Swedish politician (born 1974)

Member of the Riksdag
- Incumbent
- Assumed office 28 September 2026
- Constituency: Västra Götaland County South

Personal details
- Born: 9 April 1974 (age 52) Sweden
- Party: Moderate Party

Annelie Maria Hastig Olsson (born 9 April 1974) is a Swedish politician from the Moderate Party. She has been a member of the Riksdag since 2026, elected for the Västra Götaland County South constituency.

== Biography ==
Hastig Olsson lives in Vårgårda. She is a farmer.

In the 2026 Swedish general election, Hastig Olsson was elected as a member of parliament for the Moderate Party in the Västra Götaland County South constituency. She took office on 28 September 2026.

== See also ==
- List of members of the Riksdag, 2026–2030
