= Rånnaväg =

- Location within Västra Götaland Location within Sweden
- Coordinates: 57°41′N 13°28′E
- Country: Sweden
- Province: Västergötland
- County: Västra Götaland County
- Municipality: Ulricehamn Municipality

Area
  - Total: 0.49 km^{2} (0.19 sq mi)

Population (31 December 2010)
  - Total: 336
  - Density: 681/km^{2} (1,760/sq mi)
- Time zone: UTC+1 (CET)
  - Summer (DST): UTC+2 (CEST)
- Climate: Dfb

Rånnaväg is a locality situated in Ulricehamn Municipality, Västra Götaland County, Sweden with 336 inhabitants in 2010.
