= Vegby =

- Location within Västra Götaland Location within Sweden
- Coordinates: 57°41′N 13°23′E
- Country: Sweden
- Province: Västergötland
- County: Västra Götaland County
- Municipality: Ulricehamn Municipality

Area
  - Total: 0.80 km^{2} (0.31 sq mi)

Population (31 December 2010)
  - Total: 549
  - Density: 685/km^{2} (1,770/sq mi)
- Time zone: UTC+1 (CET)
  - Summer (DST): UTC+2 (CEST)
- Climate: Dfb

Vegby is a locality situated in Ulricehamn Municipality, Västra Götaland County, Sweden with 549 inhabitants in 2010.
