= Dalum, Sweden =

Dalum
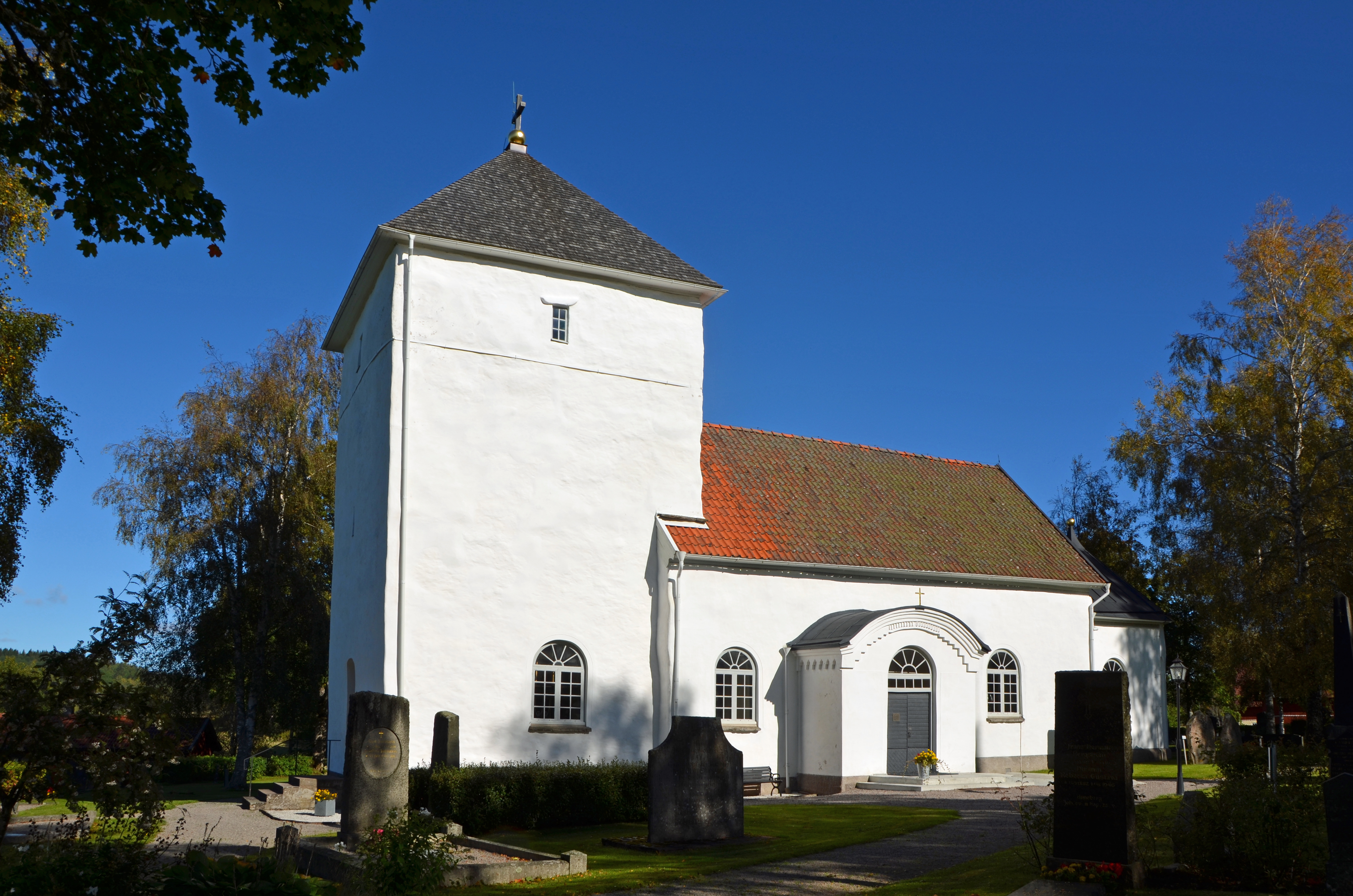
- Dalum church

- Location within Västra Götaland Location within Sweden
- Coordinates: 57°54′N 13°28′E
- Country: Sweden
- Province: Västergötland
- County: Västra Götaland County
- Municipality: Ulricehamn Municipality

Area
  - Total: 0.61 km^{2} (0.24 sq mi)

Population (31 December 2010)
  - Total: 638
  - Density: 1,052/km^{2} (2,720/sq mi)
- Time zone: UTC+1 (CET)
  - Summer (DST): UTC+2 (CEST)
- Climate: Dfb

Dalum is a locality situated in Ulricehamn Municipality, Västra Götaland County, Sweden with 638 inhabitants in 2010.
