= Timmele =

- Location within Västra Götaland Location within Sweden
- Coordinates: 57°51′N 13°26′E
- Country: Sweden
- Province: Västergötland
- County: Västra Götaland County
- Municipality: Ulricehamn Municipality

Area
  - Total: 1.21 km^{2} (0.47 sq mi)

Population (31 December 2010)
  - Total: 847
  - Density: 700/km^{2} (1,800/sq mi)
- Time zone: UTC+1 (CET)
  - Summer (DST): UTC+2 (CEST)
- Climate: Dfb

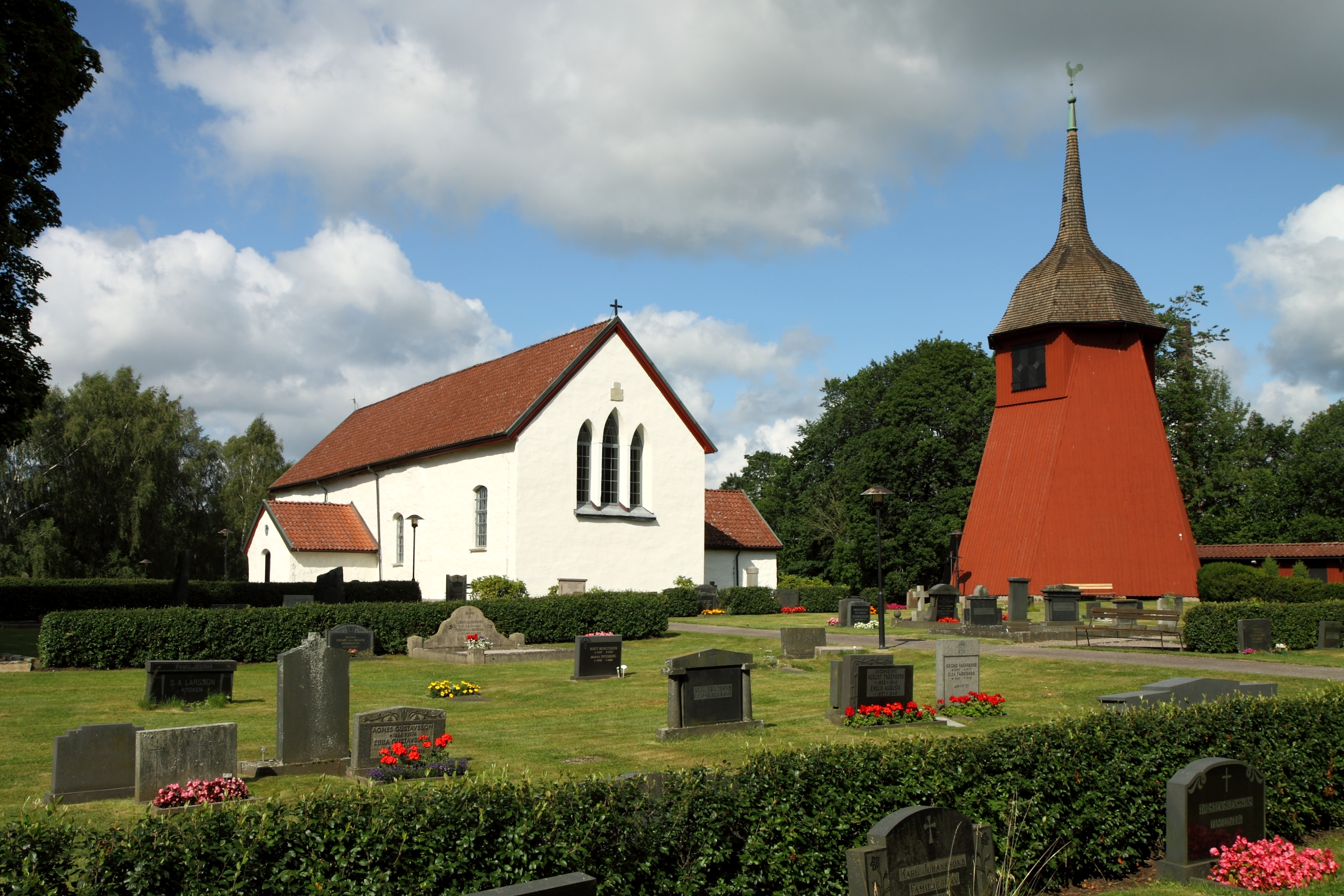

Timmele is a locality situated in Ulricehamn Municipality, Västra Götaland County, Sweden with 847 inhabitants in 2010.
