= Jessica Rodén =

Swedish politician (born 1976)

Member of the Riksdag
- Incumbent
- Assumed office 26 September 2022
- Constituency: Västra Götaland County South

Personal details
- Born: 1976 (age 49–50)
- Party: Social Democrats

Jessica Rodén (born 1976) is a Swedish politician. Since September 2022, she serves as Member of the Riksdag representing the constituency of Västra Götaland County South. She is affiliated with the Social Democrats.
