= Ulrik Nilsson =

Swedish politician (born 1963)

Member of the Riksdag
- Incumbent
- Assumed office 2022
- Constituency: Västra Götaland County South
- In office 2010–2014

Personal details
- Born: 23 March 1963 (age 63) Älvsborg County, Sweden
- Party: Moderate Party

At the 2011 Gothenburg Book Fair.

Jan Ulrik Nilsson (born 23 March 1963) is a Swedish politician from the Moderate Party. He resided in the Brämhult district of Borås and was raised in Svenljunga. He was the chairman of the municipal board in Borås from 2007 to 2010. After the Moderates' success in the 2010 Swedish general election, Nilsson became a Member of Parliament. In the Riksdag, Nilsson was the party's first deputy on the Foreign Affairs Committee. In the 2014 election, Nilsson lost his parliamentary seat when the Moderates lost a mandate in the Västra Götaland County South constituency.

Nilsson began his political career in the Svenljunga municipal council in the 1980s. He was second vice-chairman of the Moderate Youth League at the same time as Fredrik Reinfeldt was chairman. Between 1998 and 2006, Nilsson was a regional councilor in the Västra Götaland region.

As chairman of the municipal board, Nilsson was involved in issues related to infrastructure, particularly the route of the Götalandsbanan through Borås and the expansion of National Road 27.

== See also ==
- List of members of the Riksdag, 2010–2014
- List of members of the Riksdag, 2022–2026
