= Anders Alftberg =

Swedish educator and politician

Member of the Riksdag
- Incumbent
- Assumed office 26 September 2022
- Constituency: Västra Götaland County South

Personal details
- Born: 21 January 1973 (age 53) Jönköping, Sweden
- Party: Sweden Democrats
- Occupation: Teacher

Anders Alftberg (born 21 January 1973 in Jönköping) is a Swedish educator and politician of the Sweden Democrats party who has been a member of the Riksdag since 2022 representing the constituency of Västra Götaland County South.

== Biography ==
Alftberg was born in Jönköping in 1973 before moving to Borås in the 1980s. He worked for sixteen years as a middle and high school teacher in Borås.

In 2018, he was elected as a municipal councilor for the Sweden Democrats in Borås and served as a political secretary to the SD's spokesman on the council. He also sat on the education board within the county. For the 2022 Swedish general election, Alftberg contested the constituency of Västra Götaland County South on the SD's ballot and won a seat. He is expected to take up seat 49 in the Riksdag.

Outside of politics, Alftberg is married with three children. He has cited former British Prime Minister Winston Churchill as a role model.

== See also ==
- List of members of the Riksdag, 2022–2026
