= Jan Ericson =

Swedish politician (born 1961)

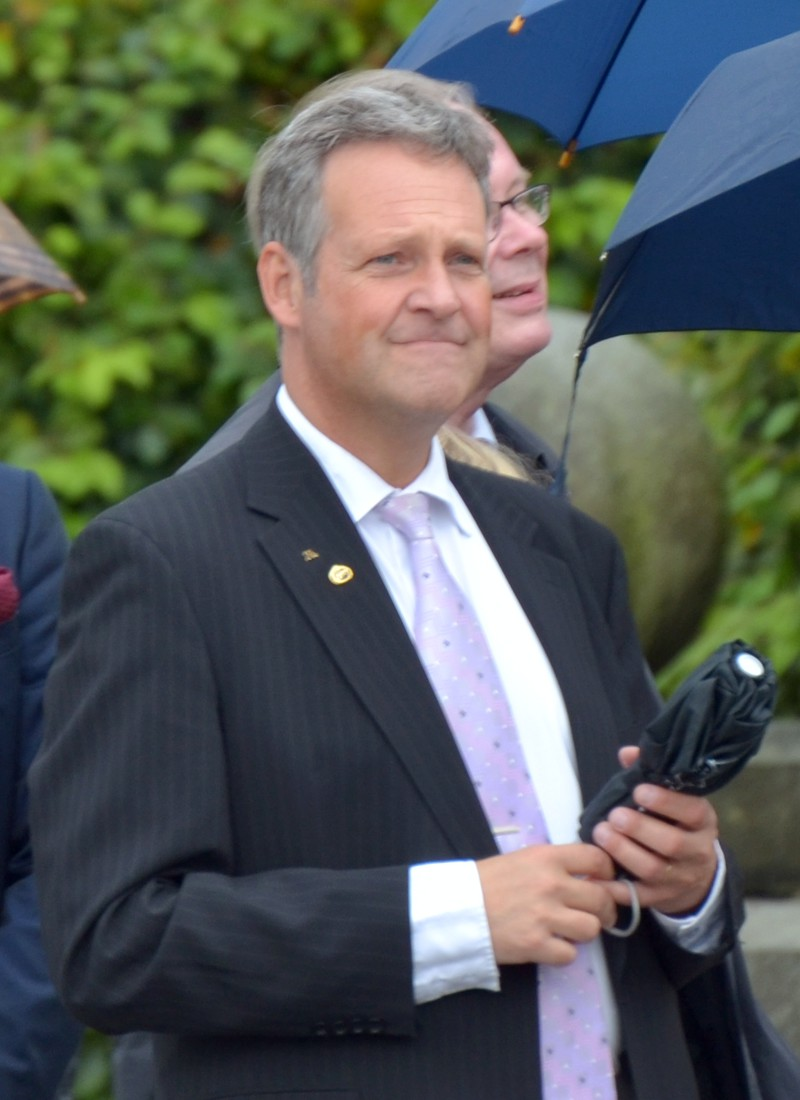

Member of the Riksdag
- In office 2 October 2006 – 28 September 2026

Personal details
- Party: Moderate
- Occupation: Jurist
- Website: http://www.ericsoniubbhult.se/

Jan Ericson (born 1961) is a former member of the Swedish Parliament for the Moderate Party. He was a member of the Committee on Labor Market. Ericson is on leave from his work as a jurist at the Skandinaviska Enskilda Banken. He lives in Hällingsjö and is elected in the constituency of Sjuhärad, Västra Götalands län.
