= Blidsberg =

- Location within Västra Götaland Location within Sweden
- Coordinates: 57°56′N 13°29′E
- Country: Sweden
- Province: Västergötland
- County: Västra Götaland County
- Municipality: Ulricehamn Municipality

Area
  - Total: 0.87 km^{2} (0.34 sq mi)

Population (31 December 2010)
  - Total: 508
  - Density: 585/km^{2} (1,520/sq mi)
- Time zone: UTC+1 (CET)
  - Summer (DST): UTC+2 (CEST)
- Climate: Dfb

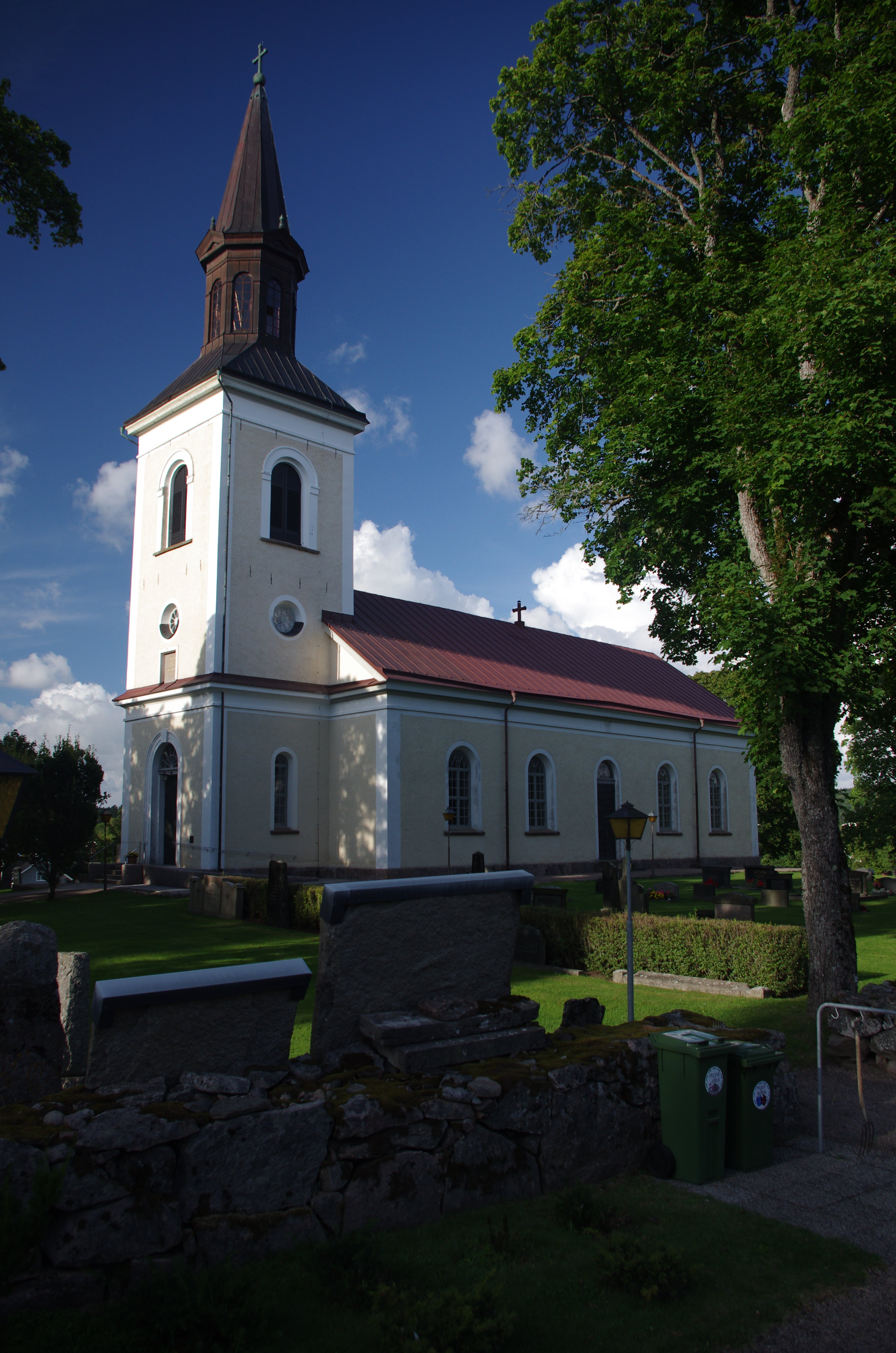
Church in Blidsberg

Blidsberg (Swedish pronunciation: [ˈblǐːdsbærj]) is a locality situated in Ulricehamn Municipality, Västra Götaland County, Sweden with 508 inhabitants in 2010.

== TV-personligheter ==
Ingegerd Samuelsson i humorgruppen "Kass humor" kommer härifrån.
