= Trädet =

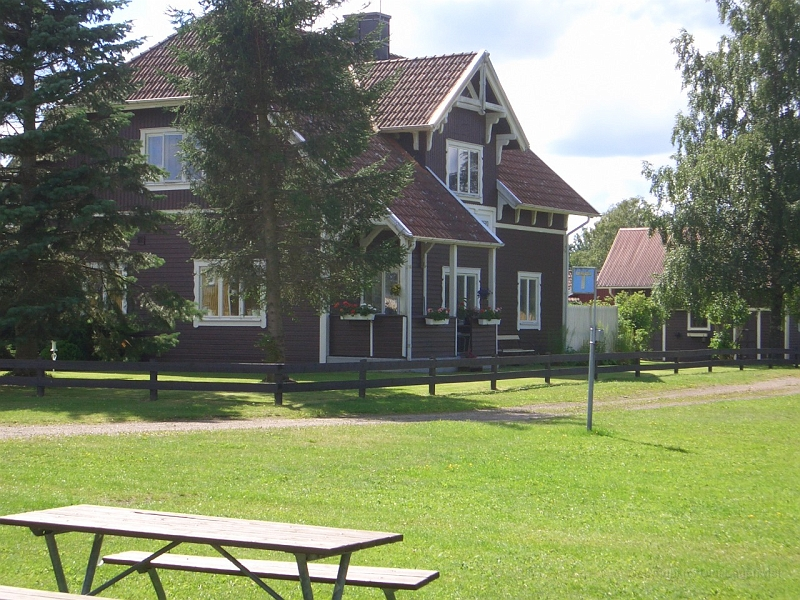

- Location within Västra Götaland Location within Sweden
- Coordinates: 57°59′N 13°32′E
- Country: Sweden
- Province: Västergötland
- County: Västra Götaland County
- Municipality: Ulricehamn Municipality

Area
  - Total: 0.55 km^{2} (0.21 sq mi)

Population (31 December 2010)
  - Total: 277
  - Density: 500/km^{2} (1,300/sq mi)
- Time zone: UTC+1 (CET)
  - Summer (DST): UTC+2 (CEST)
- Climate: Dfb

Trädet (Swedish pronunciation: [ˈtrɛ̂ːdɛt]) is a locality situated in Ulricehamn Municipality, Västra Götaland County, Sweden with 277 inhabitants in 2010.
