= Cecilie Tenfjord-Toftby =

Swedish politician (born 1970)

Cecilie Tenfjord-Toftby (born 3 January 1970 in Norway) is a Swedish Moderate Party politician. She has been Mayor of Borås since October 2026 and was member of the Riksdag from 2008 to 2022.
