= Berndt Ekholm =

Swedish politician (born 1944)

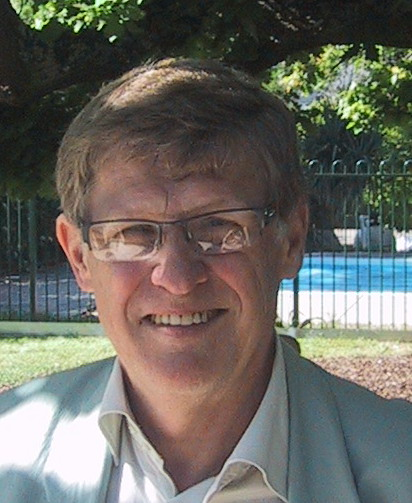
A photo of Berndt Ekholm in the grounds of the Swedish Church in Melbourne Australia

Berndt Ekholm (born 1944) is a Swedish Social Democratic politician, member of the Riksdag 1985–2006.
