= Ulf Sjösten =

Swedish politician (born 1954)

Ulf Sjösten (born 8 April 1954) is a Swedish politician of the Moderate Party, member of the Riksdag from 2002 to 2008.
