= Arne Kjörnsberg =

Swedish politician (1936–2023)

Arne Kjörnsberg (12 January 1936 – 14 March 2023) was a Swedish social democratic politician who was a member of the Riksdag from 1985 to 2006.

Kjörnsberg died on 14 March 2023, at the age of 87.
