= Ann-Christin Ahlberg =

Swedish politician (born 1957)

Ann-Christin Ahlberg S
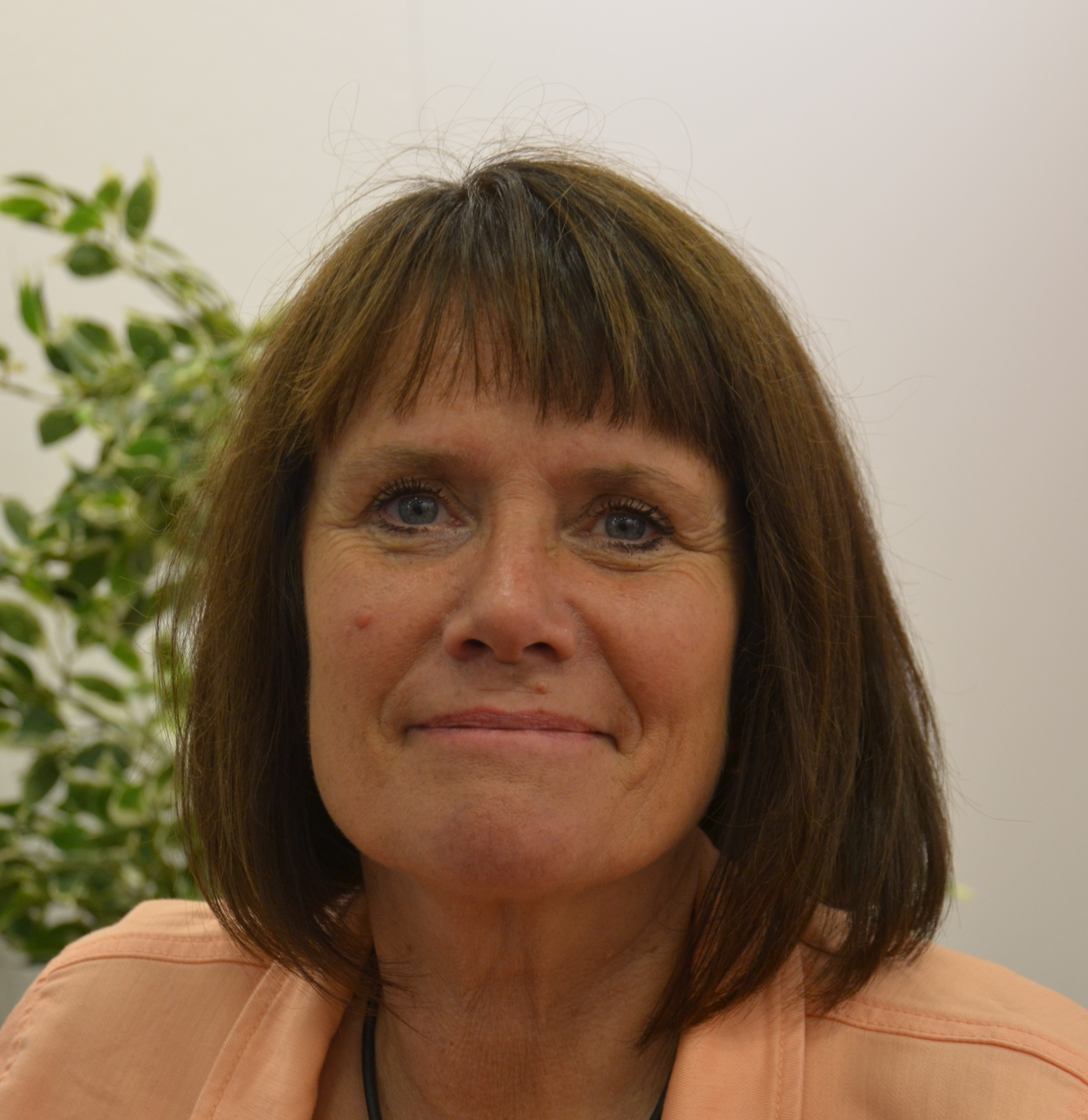
- Ann-Christin Ahlberg in October 2014

Member of the Swedish Parliament for Västra Götaland County South
- Incumbent
- Assumed office 2006

Personal details
- Born: 27 September 1957 (age 68) Sweden
- Party: Social Democratic Party
- Children: 2
- Profession: Nanny, politician

Ann-Christin Ahlberg (born 27 September 1957) is a Swedish politician for the Social Democratic Party and a member of the Swedish Riksdag since 2006. She is taking up seat number 19 for Västra Götaland County South constituency. Besides being a politician, she works as a nanny. She lives in Borås and is married with two adult children.

== Political career ==
She was first brought into the Riksdag in 2005 as a replacement for a colleague who left the Riksdag. After the 2006 general election she was officially elected to the Riksdag. In 2005 and 2006 she was an alternate for the Labour Market Committee and the Social Insurance Committee. After the 2006 election, she became an official member of those committees.

During the 2010 general election she left the Social Insurance Committee and became an alternate for the Defence Committee. After the 2018 general elections, she left the Social Insurance Committee to join the Health and Welfare Committee.
