= Hökerum =

- Location within Västra Götaland Location within Sweden
- Coordinates: 57°51′N 13°17′E
- Country: Sweden
- Province: Västergötland
- County: Västra Götaland County
- Municipality: Ulricehamn Municipality

Area
  - Total: 0.90 km^{2} (0.35 sq mi)

Population (31 December 2010)
  - Total: 695
  - Density: 772/km^{2} (2,000/sq mi)
- Time zone: UTC+1 (CET)
  - Summer (DST): UTC+2 (CEST)
- Climate: Dfb

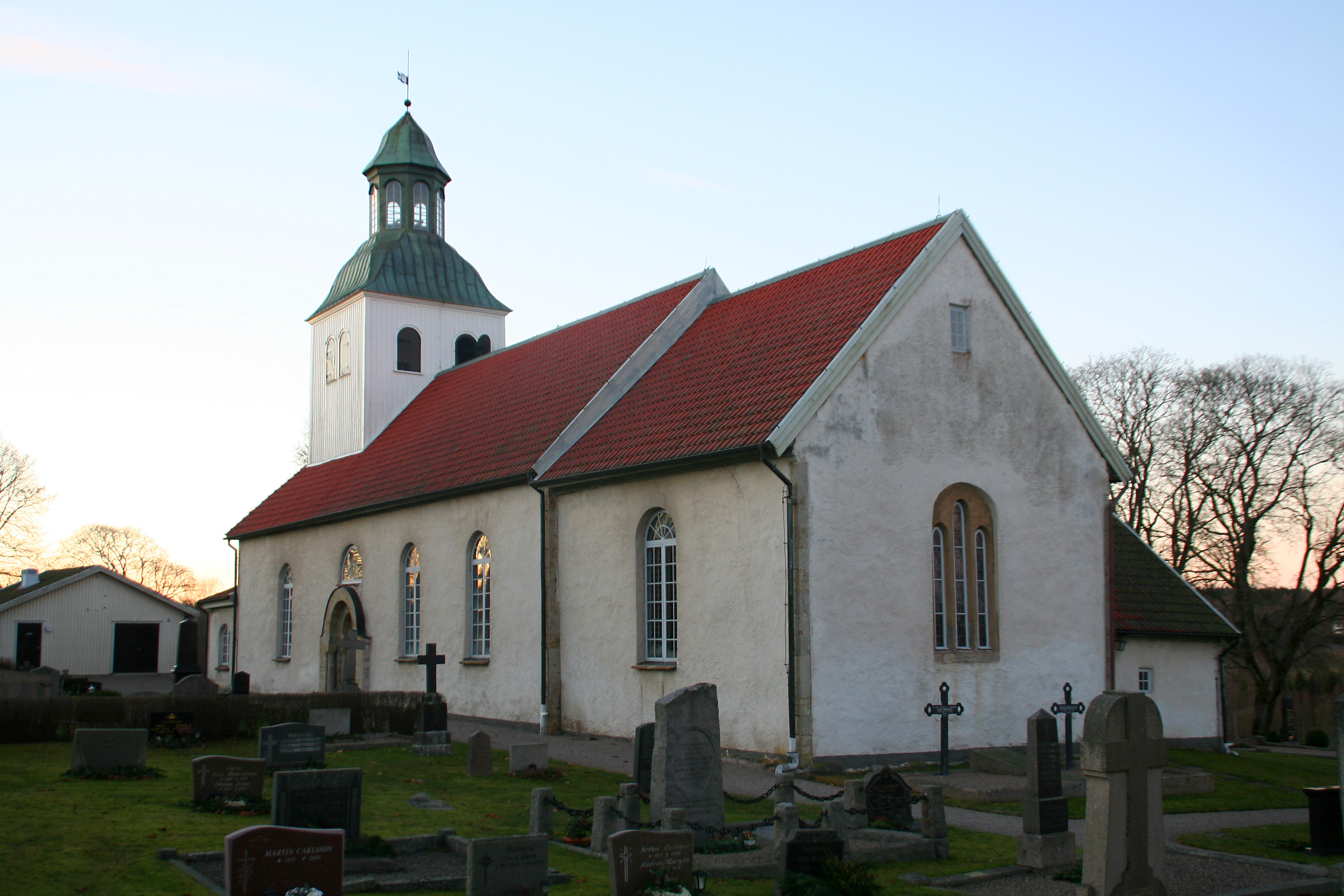
Södra Ving Church

Hökerum is a locality situated in Ulricehamn Municipality, Västra Götaland County, Sweden with 695 inhabitants in 2010.
