= Committee on Justice =

Swedish parliamentary committee

The (Parliamentary) Committee on Justice (Swedish: Justitieutskottet, JuU) is a parliamentary committee in the Swedish Riksdag. The committee's main areas of responsibility concern Judiciary policies on various different authorities, among other things, the courts, Prosecution Authority, the Police Authorities, the Prison and Probation Service, along with matters that concern the criminal code, the Code of Judicial Procedure, and laws that replace or are closely related to regulations that concern these areas.

The chairman of the committee has been, since 2025, Henrik Vinge of the Sweden Democrats and the deputy chairman of the committee has been, since 2024, Teresa Carvalho of the Social Democrats.

== List of speakers for the committee ==
Name	Period	Political party
Bertil Lidgard	1977-1984	Moderate Party
Karin Ahrland	1985–1989	People's Party
Britta Bjelle	1989–1994	People's Party
Gun Hellsvik	1994–2001	Moderate Party
Fredrik Reinfeldt	2001–2002	Moderate Party
Johan Pehrson	2002–2006	Liberal People's Party
Thomas Bodström	2006–2010	Social Democratic Party
Morgan Johansson	2010–2011	Social Democratic Party
Kerstin Haglö	2011	Social Democratic Party
Morgan Johansson	2011–2014	Social Democratic Party
Beatrice Ask	2014–2017	Moderate Party
Tomas Tobé	2017–2018	Moderate Party
Fredrik Lundh Sammeli	2018–2022	Social Democratic Party
Richard Jomshof	2022–2025	Sweden Democrats
Henrik Vinge	2025–	Sweden Democrats

== List of vice-speakers for the committee ==
Name	Period	Political party
Morgan Johansson	2002	Social Democratic Party
Susanne Eberstein	2002–2004	Social Democratic Party
Britta Lejon	2004–2006	Social Democratic Party
Inger Davidsson	2006–2010	Christian Democrats
Johan Linander	2010–2014	Centre Party
Annika Hirvonen Falk	2014–2015	Green Party
Mats Pertoft	2015–2016	Green Party
Annika Hirvonen Falk	2016–2018	Green Party
Andreas Carlson	2018–2022	Christian Democrats
Petter Löberg	2022	Social Democratic Party
Ardalan Shekarabi	2022–2024	Social Democratic Party
Teresa Carvalho	2024–	Social Democratic Party
