= Phia Andersson =

Swedish politician (born 1955)

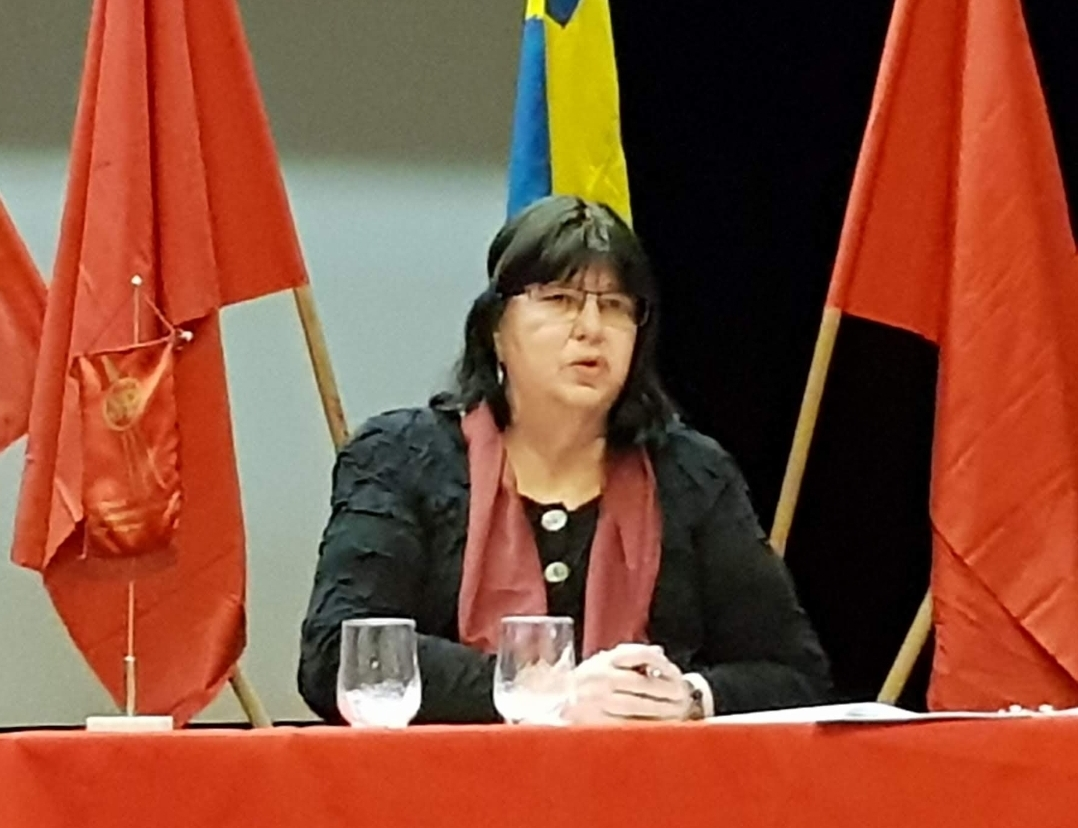

member of the Riksdag
- In office 2006–2018

Personal details
- Political party: Social Democratic Party

Phia Andersson (born 1955) is a Swedish politician of the Social Democratic Party. She was a member of the Riksdag from 2006 to 2018. Her constituency was that of Västra Götaland County South.
