= Ulricehamn Municipality =

Ulricehamn Municipality Ulricehamns kommun
- Municipality
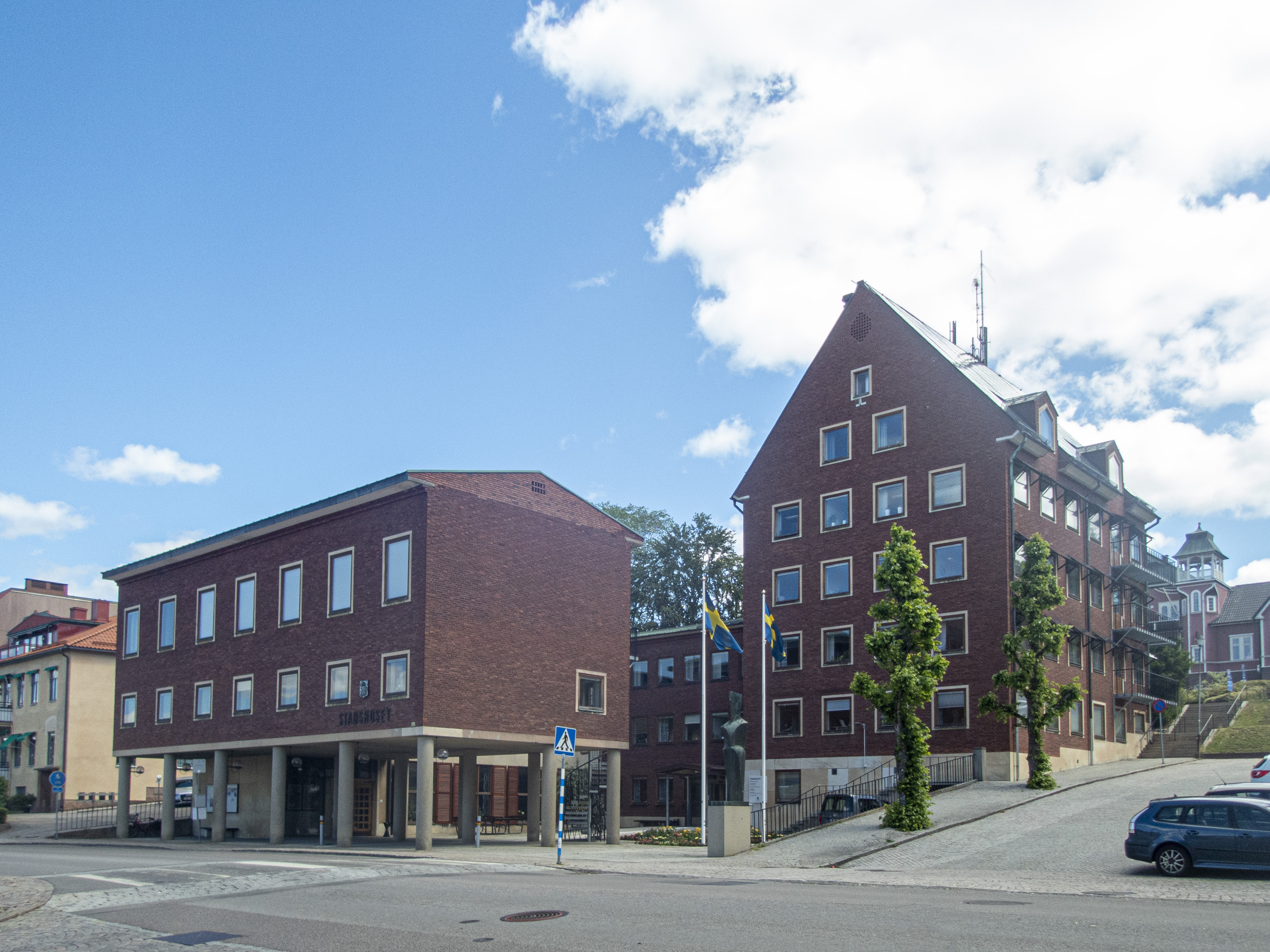
- Ulricehamn town hall

- Coat of arms

- Coordinates: 57°47′N 13°25′E
- Country: Sweden
- County: Västra Götaland County
- Seat: Ulricehamn

Area
  - Total: 1,116.71 km^{2} (431.16 sq mi)
  - Land: 1,046.02 km^{2} (403.87 sq mi)
  - Water: 70.69 km^{2} (27.29 sq mi)
- Area as of 1 January 2014.

Population (30 June 2025)
  - Total: 24,974
  - Density: 23.875/km^{2} (61.837/sq mi)
- Time zone: UTC+1 (CET)
  - Summer (DST): UTC+2 (CEST)
- ISO 3166 code: SE
- Province: Västergötland
- Municipal code: 1491
- Website: www.ulricehamn.se

Ulricehamn Municipality (Swedish: Ulricehamns kommun) is a municipality in Västra Götaland County in western Sweden. Its seat is located in the city of Ulricehamn.

The present municipality was created in 1974 when the former City of Ulricehamn was merged with three former rural municipalities (themselves established through amalgamations of minor units in 1952).

== Localities ==
- Blidsberg
- Dalum
- Gällstad
- Hulu
- Hökerum
- Marbäck
- Nitta
- Rånnaväg
- Timmele
- Trädet
- Ulricehamn (seat)
- Vegby
- Älmestad

== Demographics ==
This is a demographic table based on Ulricehamn Municipality's electoral districts in the 2022 Swedish general election sourced from SVT's election platform, in turn taken from SCB official statistics.

In total there were 24,871 residents, including 18,972 Swedish citizens of voting age. 43.9% voted for the left coalition and 54.8% for the right coalition.

Location	Residents	Citizen adults	Left vote	Right vote	Employed	Swedish parents	Foreign heritage	Income SEK	Degree
Location			%	%					
Blidsberg/Dalum	2,089	1,571	38.0	59.9	79	82	18	22,233	27
Centrum/Tingsholm N	1,692	1,409	47.9	51.2	79	78	22	21,756	34
Fridhem/Paradiset/C-S	2,028	1,641	44.7	54.3	83	85	15	26,372	38
Gunnarshill	1,648	1,201	50.4	48.3	85	76	24	26,758	36
Gällstad/Rånnaväg	2,113	1,611	46.1	52.8	84	83	17	24,464	27
Hökerum/Nitta	2,451	1,838	40.4	58.2	87	88	12	26,465	32
Hössna/Liared	1,479	1,098	35.7	63.0	85	89	11	25,736	30
Marbäck/Fredriksberg	2,385	1,760	48.5	50.3	87	85	15	28,334	42
Markuslyckan/Karlslätt	1,525	1,094	48.9	49.1	82	71	29	25,533	34
Skarpås/Furet	1,695	1,279	46.2	52.8	85	80	20	26,847	35
Timmele/Älmestad	2,024	1,599	37.8	61.4	86	90	10	25,893	28
Tvärred/Vegby	2,059	1,514	45.7	53.2	83	82	18	25,968	32
Villastaden/Bronäs	1,683	1,357	44.3	54.7	83	82	18	24,739	33
Source: SVT
