= Hällingsjö =

- Location within Västra Götaland Location within Sweden
- Coordinates: 57°37′N 12°26′E
- Country: Sweden
- Province: Västergötland
- County: Västra Götaland County
- Municipality: Härryda Municipality

Area
  - Total: 0.43 km^{2} (0.17 sq mi)

Population (31 December 2010)
  - Total: 308
  - Density: 711/km^{2} (1,840/sq mi)
- Time zone: UTC+1 (CET)
  - Summer (DST): UTC+2 (CEST)

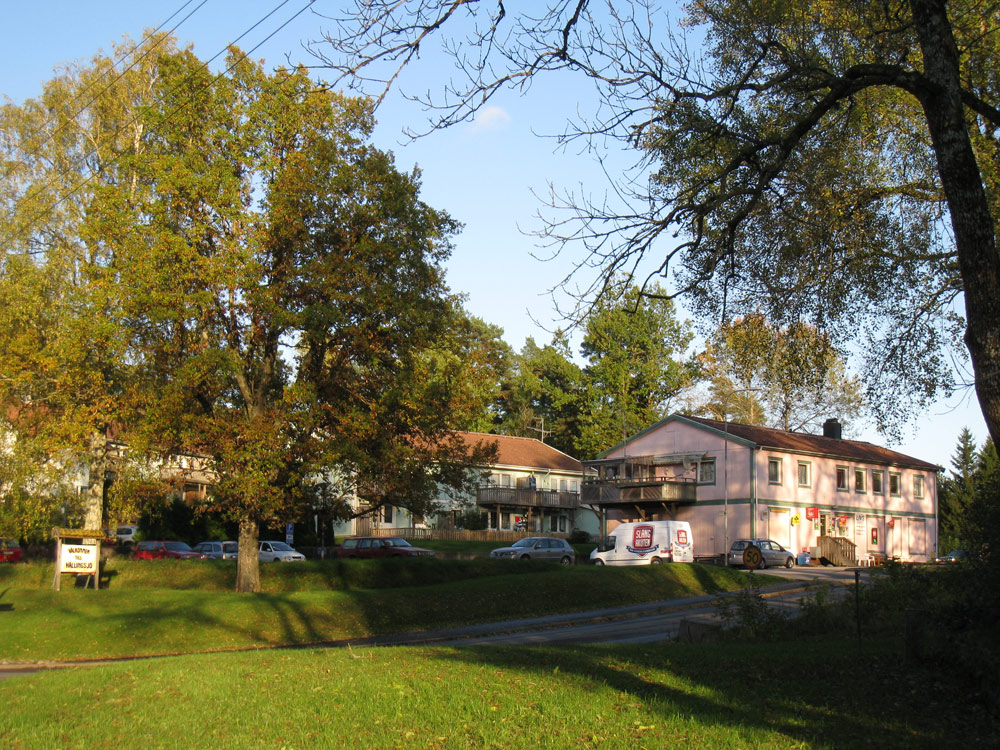
Photo of the Härryda kommun, Västra Götaland

Hällingsjö is a locality situated in Härryda Municipality, Västra Götaland County, Sweden. It had 308 inhabitants in 2010.
