= List of members of the Riksdag, 2014–2018 =

This is a list of members of the Swedish parliament for the term 2014–2018. The MPs were elected in the general election held on 14 September 2014 and took office on 30 September 2014.

== List of elected MPs ==
Seat	Member of Parliament	Party	Constituency
134	Anders Ahlgren	Centre	Dalarna County
90	Anders Åkesson	Centre	Kalmar County
310	Per Åsling	Centre	Jämtland County
133	Daniel Bäckström	Centre	Värmland County
70	Ulrika Carlsson	Centre	Västra Götaland County East
193	Fredrik Christensson	Centre	Västra Götaland County West
32	Lena Ek	Centre	Östergötland County
182	Eskil Erlandsson	Centre	Kronoberg County
244	Johan Hedin	Centre	Stockholm City
225	Ola Johansson	Centre	Halland County
65	Per-Ingvar Johnsson	Centre	Skåne County North and East
76	Anders W. Jonsson	Centre	Gävleborg County
315	Johanna Jönsson	Centre	Stockholm City
274	Emil Källström	Centre	Västernorrland County
139	Helena Lindahl	Centre	Västerbotten County
114	Per Lodenius	Centre	Stockholm County
253	Annie Lööf	Centre	Jönköping County
53	Kerstin Lundgren	Centre	Stockholm County
265	Rickard Nordin	Centre	Gothenburg City
161	Annika Qarlsson	Centre	Västra Götaland County North
294	Kristina Yngwe	Centre	Skåne County South
29	Solveig Zander	Centre	Uppsala County
291	Andreas Carlson	Christian Democrats	Jönköping County
258	Sofia Damm	Christian Democrats	Skåne County South
100	Annika Eclund	Christian Democrats	Västra Götaland County East
212	Jakob Forssmed	Christian Democrats	Stockholm County
230	Penilla Gunther	Christian Democrats	Västra Götaland County North
156	Göran Hägglund	Christian Democrats	Halland County
174	Robert Halef	Christian Democrats	Stockholm County
144	Emma Henriksson	Christian Democrats	Stockholm County
336	Aron Modig	Christian Democrats	Gothenburg City
233	Lars-Axel Nordell	Christian Democrats	Örebro County
119	Magnus Oscarsson	Christian Democrats	Östergötland County
7	Mikael Oscarsson	Christian Democrats	Uppsala County
111	Désirée Pethrus	Christian Democrats	Stockholm City
15	Tuve Skånberg	Christian Democrats	Skåne County North and East
208	Caroline Szyber	Christian Democrats	Stockholm City
158	Roland Utbult	Christian Democrats	Västra Götaland County West
302	Janine Alm Ericson	Green	Västra Götaland County North
108	Jabar Amin	Green	Västerbotten County
72	Stina Bergström	Green	Värmland County
142	Per Bolund	Green	Stockholm City
224	Agneta Börjesson	Green	Halland County
3	Esabelle Dingizian	Green	Stockholm County
270	Jonas Eriksson	Green	Örebro County
242	Maria Ferm	Green	Stockholm City
39	Gustav Fridolin	Green	Skåne County North and East
211	Annika Hirvonen Falk	Green	Stockholm County
327	Emma Hult	Green	Jönköping County
88	Annika Lillemets	Green	Östergötland County
21	Jan Lindholm	Green	Dalarna County
152	Rasmus Ling	Green	Malmö Municipality
117	Niclas Malmberg	Green	Uppsala County
262	Valter Mutt	Green	Gothenburg City
192	Emma Nohrén	Green	Västra Götaland County West
264	Lise Nordin	Green	Gothenburg City
314	Per Olsson	Green	Stockholm City
293	Rickard Persson	Green	Skåne County West
172	Åsa Romson	Green	Stockholm City
248	Carl Schlyter	Green	Stockholm County
137	Anders Schröder	Green	Gävleborg County
153	Karin Svensson Smith	Green	Skåne County South
322	Marco Venegas	Green	Södermanland County
48	Ulla Andersson	Left	Gävleborg County
318	Nooshi Dadgostar	Left	Stockholm County
130	Rossana Dinamarca	Left	Västra Götaland County North
210	Ali Esbati	Left	Stockholm County
344	Stig Henriksson	Left	Västmanland County
239	Christina Höj Larsen	Left	Västernorrland County
207	Jens Holm	Left	Stockholm City
98	Wiwi-Anne Johansson	Left	Västra Götaland County West
287	Lotta Johnsson Fornarve	Left	Södermanland County
170	Amineh Kakabaveh	Left	Stockholm City
301	Maj Karlsson	Left	Gothenburg City
313	Birger Lahti	Left	Norrbotten County
228	Hans Linde	Left	Gothenburg City
279	Karin Rågsjö	Left	Stockholm City
165	Daniel Riazat	Left	Dalarna County
123	Daniel Sestrajcic	Left	Malmö Municipality
109	Jonas Sjöstedt	Left	Västerbotten County
149	Linda Snecker	Left	Östergötland County
163	Håkan Svenneling	Left	Värmland County
235	Mia Sydow Mölleby	Left	Örebro County
116	Emma Wallrup	Left	Uppsala County
339	Said Abdu	Liberals	Västra Götaland County North
213	Maria Arnholm	Liberals	Stockholm County
113	Jan Björklund	Liberals	Stockholm County
288	Emma Carlsson Löfdahl	Liberals	Jönköping County
297	Bengt Eliasson	Liberals	Halland County
308	Roger Haddad	Liberals	Västmanland County
337	Robert Hannah	Liberals	Gothenburg City
141	Fredrik Malm	Liberals	Stockholm City
38	Christer Nylander	Liberals	Skåne County North and East
80	Birgitta Ohlsson	Liberals	Stockholm City
196	Johan Pehrson	Liberals	Örebro County
259	Mats Persson	Liberals	Skåne County South
220	Torkild Strandberg	Liberals	Skåne County West
89	Mathias Sundin	Liberals	Östergötland County
40	Lars Tysklind	Liberals	Västra Götaland County West
143	Erik Ullenhag	Liberals	Stockholm City
146	Maria Weimer	Liberals	Uppsala County
25	Barbro Westerholm	Liberals	Stockholm County
62	Allan Widman	Liberals	Malmö Municipality
155	Boriana Åberg	Moderate	Skåne County South
206	Maria Abrahamsson	Moderate	Stockholm City
209	Amir Adan	Moderate	Stockholm City
94	Anette Åkesson	Moderate	Skåne County North and East
282	Erik Andersson	Moderate	Stockholm County
91	Jan R. Andersson	Moderate	Kalmar County
121	Jörgen Andersson	Moderate	Kalmar County
140	Sofia Arkelsten	Moderate	Stockholm City
24	Beatrice Ask	Moderate	Stockholm City
200	Lena Asplund	Moderate	Västernorrland County
85	Anti Avsan	Moderate	Stockholm County
177	Hanif Bali	Moderate	Stockholm County
31	Finn Bengtsson	Moderate	Östergötland County
47	Margareta Berg Kjellin	Moderate	Gävleborg County
45	Ulf Berg	Moderate	Dalarna County
71	Sten Bergheden	Moderate	Västra Götaland County East
6	Per Bill	Moderate	Uppsala County
1	Tobias Billström	Moderate	Malmö Municipality
105	Carl-Oskar Bohlin	Moderate	Dalarna County
252	Helena Bouveng	Moderate	Jönköping County
218	Katarina Brännström	Moderate	Kronoberg County
194	Mikael Cederbratt	Moderate	Västra Götaland County North
110	Margareta Cederfelt	Moderate	Stockholm City
309	Åsa Coenraads	Moderate	Västmanland County
324	Sotiris Delis	Moderate	Jönköping County
320	Ida Drougge	Moderate	Stockholm County
83	Catharina Elmsäter-Svärd	Moderate	Stockholm County
10	Annicka Engblom	Moderate	Blekinge County
55	Hillevi Engström	Moderate	Stockholm County
26	Karin Enström	Moderate	Stockholm County
304	Jan Ericson	Moderate	Västra Götaland County South
221	Thomas Finnborg	Moderate	Skåne County West
250	Lotta Finstorp	Moderate	Södermanland County
321	Sofia Fölster	Moderate	Stockholm County
171	Johan Forssell	Moderate	Stockholm City
316	Tina Ghasemi	Moderate	Stockholm City
325	Mats Green	Moderate	Jönköping County
73	Pia Hallström	Moderate	Värmland County
185	Ann-Charlotte Hammar Johnsson	Moderate	Skåne County West
240	Krister Hammarbergh	Moderate	Norrbotten County
154	Anders Hansson	Moderate	Skåne County South
227	Lars Hjälmered	Moderate	Gothenburg City
34	Gustaf Hoffstedt	Moderate	Gotland County
44	Christian Holm	Moderate	Värmland County
254	Johan Hultberg	Moderate	Kronoberg County
256	Jonas Jacobsson Gjörtler	Moderate	Skåne County West
229	Ellen Juntti	Moderate	Västra Götaland County West
28	Ulrika Karlsson	Moderate	Uppsala County
84	Anna Kinberg Batra	Moderate	Stockholm County
179	Ulf Kristersson	Moderate	Södermanland County
63	Olof Lavesson	Moderate	Malmö Municipality
202	Eva Lohman	Moderate	Västernorrland County
190	Cecilia Magnusson	Moderate	Gothenburg City
9	Betty Malmberg	Moderate	Östergötland County
97	Maria Malmer Stenergard	Moderate	Skåne County North and East
187	Gunilla Nordgren	Moderate	Skåne County South
30	Andreas Norlén	Moderate	Östergötland County
306	Lotta Olsson	Moderate	Örebro County
261	Jenny Petersson	Moderate	Halland County
112	Göran Pettersson	Moderate	Stockholm County
99	Maria Plass	Moderate	Västra Götaland County West
261	Jessica Polfjärd	Moderate	Västmanland County
311	Saila Quicklund	Moderate	Jämtland County
4	Fredrik Reinfeldt	Moderate	Stockholm City
92	Patrick Reslow	Moderate	Malmö Municipality
168	Edward Riedl	Moderate	Västerbotten County
243	Jessica Rosencrantz	Moderate	Stockholm City
57	Jessika Roswall	Moderate	Uppsala County
226	Hans Rothenberg	Moderate	Gothenburg City
54	Ewa Björling	Moderate	Stockholm County
128	Lars-Arne Staxäng	Moderate	Västra Götaland County West
246	Maria Stockhaus	Moderate	Stockholm County
298	Lisbeth Sundén Andersson	Moderate	Gothenburg City
232	Elisabeth Svantesson	Moderate	Örebro County
189	Michael Svensson	Moderate	Halland County
305	Cecilie Tenfjord-Toftby	Moderate	Västra Götaland County South
125	Ewa Thalén Finné	Moderate	Skåne County South
49	Tomas Tobé	Moderate	Gävleborg County
64	Hans Wallmark	Moderate	Skåne County North and East
231	Camilla Waltersson Grönvall	Moderate	Västra Götaland County North
332	Jörgen Warborn	Moderate	Halland County
147	Per Westerberg	Moderate	Södermanland County
42	Cecilia Widegren	Moderate	Västra Götaland County East
285	Niklas Wykman	Moderate	Stockholm County
122	Jennie Åfeldt	Sweden Democrats	Malmö Municipality
333	Jeff Ahl	Sweden Democrats	Halland County
273	Jonas Åkerlund	Sweden Democrats	Västmanland County
290	Jimmie Åkesson	Sweden Democrats	Jönköping County
275	Mattias Bäckström Johansson	Sweden Democrats	Västernorrland County
317	Angelika Bengtsson	Sweden Democrats	Stockholm City
151	Paula Bieler	Sweden Democrats	Kalmar County
307	Sara-Lena Bjälkö	Sweden Democrats	Örebro County
96	Linus Bylund	Sweden Democrats	Skåne County North and East
328	Dennis Dioukarev	Sweden Democrats	Jönköping County
67	Kent Ekeroth	Sweden Democrats	Skåne County North and East
331	Aron Emilsson	Sweden Democrats	Skåne County West
107	Mikael Eskilandersson	Sweden Democrats	Gävleborg County
286	Olle Felten	Sweden Democrats	Södermanland County
118	Runar Filper	Sweden Democrats	Östergötland County
93	Anders Forsberg	Sweden Democrats	Malmö Municipality
86	Josef Fransson	Sweden Democrats	Uppsala County
295	Pavel Gamov	Sweden Democrats	Skåne County South
169	Anna Hagwall	Sweden Democrats	Västerbotten County
284	Roger Hedlund	Sweden Democrats	Stockholm County
175	Carina Herrstedt	Sweden Democrats	Stockholm County
345	Stefan Jakobsson	Sweden Democrats	Västmanland County
77	Mikael Jansson	Sweden Democrats	Gävleborg County
13	Richard Jomshof	Sweden Democrats	Blekinge County
223	Patrik Jönsson	Sweden Democrats	Skåne County South
341	Peter Lundgren	Sweden Democrats	Östergötland County
131	Kristina Winberg	Sweden Democrats	Västra Götaland County South
103	Mattias Karlsson	Sweden Democrats	Värmland County
334	Martin Kinnunen	Sweden Democrats	Gothenburg City
159	Per Klarberg	Sweden Democrats	Västra Götaland County West
176	Julia Kronlid	Sweden Democrats	Stockholm County
271	David Lång	Sweden Democrats	Örebro County
101	Margareta Larsson	Sweden Democrats	Västra Götaland County East
245	Adam Marttinen	Sweden Democrats	Stockholm City
338	Jonas Millard	Sweden Democrats	Västra Götaland County North
127	Johan Nissinen	Sweden Democrats	Skåne County North and East
164	Magnus Persson	Sweden Democrats	Dalarna County
219	Per Ramhorn	Sweden Democrats	Kronoberg County
257	Roger Richtoff	Sweden Democrats	Skåne County West
75	Sven-Olof Sällström	Sweden Democrats	Dalarna County
323	Oscar Sjöstedt	Sweden Democrats	Södermanland County
260	Johnny Skalin	Sweden Democrats	Halland County
2	Björn Söder	Sweden Democrats	Stockholm County
300	Jimmy Ståhl	Sweden Democrats	Gothenburg City
181	Christoffer Dulny	Sweden Democrats	Östergötland County
150	Christina Östberg	Sweden Democrats	Kalmar County
266	Markus Wiechel	Sweden Democrats	Västra Götaland County North
349	Hanna Wigh	Sweden Democrats	Norrbotten County
129	Tony Wiklander	Sweden Democrats	Västra Götaland County West
268	Ann-Christin Ahlberg	Social Democrats	Västra Götaland County South
18	Urban Ahlin	Social Democrats	Västra Götaland County East
303	Maria Andersson Willner	Social Democrats	Västra Götaland County North
59	Johan Andersson	Social Democrats	Östergötland County
247	Magdalena Andersson	Social Democrats	Stockholm County
269	Phia Andersson	Social Democrats	Västra Götaland County South
197	Lennart Axelsson	Social Democrats	Örebro County
115	Ibrahim Baylan	Social Democrats	Stockholm County
234	Håkan Bergman	Social Democrats	Örebro County
277	Hannah Bergstedt	Social Democrats	Norrbotten County
43	Patrik Björck	Social Democrats	Västra Götaland County East
68	Catharina Bråkenhielm	Social Democrats	Västra Götaland County West
312	Sven-Erik Bucht	Social Democrats	Norrbotten County
335	Johan Büser	Social Democrats	Gothenburg City
191	Gunilla Carlsson	Social Democrats	Gothenburg City
180	Teresa Carvalho	Social Democrats	Östergötland County
162	Mikael Dahlqvist	Social Democrats	Värmland County
82	Mikael Damberg	Social Democrats	Stockholm County
296	Adnan Dibrani	Social Democrats	Halland County
166	Susanne Eberstein	Social Democrats	Västernorrland County
215	Hans Ekström	Social Democrats	Södermanland County
292	Lena Emilsson	Social Democrats	Skåne County West
183	Tomas Eneroth	Social Democrats	Kronoberg County
33	Christer Engelhardt	Social Democrats	Gotland County
343	Lars Eriksson	Social Democrats	Västmanland County
198	Matilda Ernkrans	Social Democrats	Örebro County
69	Kenneth G. Forslund	Social Democrats	Västra Götaland County West
138	Isak From	Social Democrats	Västerbotten County
27	Agneta Gille	Social Democrats	Uppsala County
35	Marie Granlund	Social Democrats	Malmö Municipality
17	Monica Green	Social Democrats	Västra Götaland County East
104	Roza Güclü Hedin	Social Democrats	Dalarna County
132	Jonas Gunnarsson	Social Democrats	Värmland County
255	Monica Haider	Social Democrats	Kronoberg County
95	Per-Arne Håkansson	Social Democrats	Skåne County North and East
120	Lena Hallengren	Social Democrats	Kalmar County
173	Arhe Hamednaca	Social Democrats	Stockholm City
326	Johanna Haraldsson	Social Democrats	Jönköping County
184	Kent Härstedt	Social Democrats	Skåne County West
195	Jörgen Hellman	Social Democrats	Västra Götaland County North
214	Caroline Helmersson Olsson	Social Democrats	Södermanland County
157	Hans Hoff	Social Democrats	Halland County
19	Berit Högman	Social Democrats	Värmland County
267	Paula Holmqvist	Social Democrats	Västra Götaland County North
46	Peter Hultqvist	Social Democrats	Dalarna County
36	Leif Jakobsson	Social Democrats	Malmö Municipality
278	Carin Jämtin	Social Democrats	Stockholm City
199	Eva-Lena Jansson	Social Democrats	Örebro County
11	Peter Jeppsson	Social Democrats	Blekinge County
299	Anna Johansson	Social Democrats	Gothenburg City
124	Morgan Johansson	Social Democrats	Skåne County South
81	Ylva Johansson	Social Democrats	Stockholm City
160	Peter Johnsson	Social Democrats	Västra Götaland County North
263	Mattias Jonsson	Social Democrats	Gothenburg City
61	Håkan Juholt	Social Democrats	Kalmar County
66	Annelie Karlsson	Social Democrats	Skåne County North and East
329	Niklas Karlsson	Social Democrats	Skåne County West
251	Sara Karlsson	Social Democrats	Södermanland County
52	Yilmaz Kerimo	Social Democrats	Stockholm County
79	Katarina Köhler	Social Democrats	Västerbotten County
37	Hillevi Larsson	Social Democrats	Malmö Municipality
16	Jan-Olof Larsson	Social Democrats	Västra Götaland County West
222	Rikard Larsson	Social Democrats	Skåne County South
330	Yasmine Larsson	Social Democrats	Skåne County West
23	Åsa Lindestam	Social Democrats	Gävleborg County
205	Veronica Lindholm	Social Democrats	Västerbotten County
340	Petter Löberg	Social Democrats	Västra Götaland County South
8	Johan Löfstrand	Social Democrats	Östergötland County
280	Stefan Löfven	Social Democrats	Stockholm City
106	Elin Lundgren	Social Democrats	Gävleborg County
276	Fredrik Lundh Sammeli	Social Democrats	Norrbotten County
136	Patrik Lundqvist	Social Democrats	Gävleborg County
14	Magnus Manhammar	Social Democrats	Blekinge County
20	Lars Mejern Larsson	Social Democrats	Värmland County
56	Pyry Niemi	Social Democrats	Uppsala County
203	Ingemar Nilsson	Social Democrats	Västernorrland County
188	Jennie Nilsson	Social Democrats	Halland County
186	Kerstin Nilsson	Social Democrats	Skåne County South
238	Kristina Nilsson	Social Democrats	Västernorrland County
236	Pia Nilsson	Social Democrats	Västmanland County
145	Ingela Nylund Watz	Social Democrats	Stockholm County
249	Leif Nysmed	Social Democrats	Stockholm County
41	Carina Ohlsson	Social Democrats	Västra Götaland County East
178	Fredrik Olovsson	Social Democrats	Södermanland County
347	Kalle Olsson	Social Democrats	Jämtland County
201	Jasenko Omanovic	Social Democrats	Västernorrland County
60	Krister Örnfjäder	Social Democrats	Kalmar County
148	Mattias Ottosson	Social Democrats	Östergötland County
281	Emanuel Öz	Social Democrats	Stockholm City
51	Veronica Palm	Social Democrats	Stockholm City
22	Raimo Pärssinen	Social Democrats	Gävleborg County
289	Peter Persson	Social Democrats	Jönköping County
216	Helene Petersson	Social Democrats	Jönköping County
78	Helén Pettersson	Social Democrats	Västerbotten County
241	Leif Pettersson	Social Democrats	Norrbotten County
346	Anna-Caren Sätherberg	Social Democrats	Jämtland County
87	Ardalan Shekarabi	Social Democrats	Uppsala County
167	Eva Sonidsson	Social Democrats	Västernorrland County
58	Anna-Lena Sörenson	Social Democrats	Östergötland County
217	Thomas Strand	Social Democrats	Jönköping County
135	Maria Strömkvist	Social Democrats	Dalarna County
102	Gunilla Svantorp	Social Democrats	Värmland County
12	Suzanne Svensson	Social Democrats	Blekinge County
5	Björn von Sydow	Social Democrats	Stockholm County
237	Olle Thorell	Social Democrats	Västmanland County
348	Emilia Töyrä	Social Democrats	Norrbotten County
74	Hans Unander	Social Democrats	Dalarna County
319	Alexandra Völker	Social Democrats	Stockholm County
342	Anna Wallén	Social Democrats	Västmanland County
126	Anna Wallentheim	Social Democrats	Skåne County North and East
283	Åsa Westlund	Social Democrats	Stockholm County
204	Björn Wiechel	Social Democrats	Västerbotten County
50	Anders Ygeman	Social Democrats	Stockholm City

== Members who resigned ==
Seat	Member of Parliament	From	To	Party	Constituency	Successor
131	Kristina Winberg	29 September 2014	29 September 2014	Sweden Democrats	Västra Götaland County East	Robert Stenkvist
341	Peter Lundgren	29 September 2014	29 September 2014	Sweden Democrats	Västra Götaland County East	Nina Kain
181	Christoffer Dulny	29 September 2014	29 September 2014	Sweden Democrats	Östergötland County	Cassandra Sundin
54	Ewa Björling	29 September 2014	16 October 2014	Moderate	Stockholm County	Fredrik Schulte
83	Catharina Elmsäter-Svärd	29 September 2014	16 December 2014	Moderate	Stockholm County	Isabella Hökmark
220	Torkild Strandberg	29 September 2014	18 December 2014	Liberals	Skåne County West	Tina Acketoft
223	Patrik Jönsson	29 September 2014	21 December 2014	Sweden Democrats	Skåne County South	Fredrik Eriksson
147	Per Westerberg	29 September 2014	30 December 2014	Moderate	Södermanland County	Erik Bengtzboe
4	Fredrik Reinfeldt	29 September 2014	31 December 2014	Moderate	Stockholm Municipality	Dag Klackenberg
34	Gustaf Hoffstedt	29 September 2014	18 January 2015	Moderate	Gotland County	Jesper Skalberg Karlsson
55	Hillevi Engström	29 September 2014	19 January 2015	Moderate	Stockholm County	Erik Ottoson
33	Christer Engelhardt	29 September 2014	31 January 2015	Social Democrats	Gotland County	Hanna Westerén
196	Johan Pehrson	29 September 2014	19 April 2015	Liberals	Örebro County	Christina Örnebjär
156	Göran Hägglund	29 September 2014	24 April 2015	Christian Democrats	Halland County	Larry Söder
32	Lena Ek	29 September 2014	31 July 2015	Centre	Östergötland County	Staffan Danielsson
6	Per Bill	29 September 2014	27 August 2015	Moderate	Uppsala County	Marta Obminska
51	Veronica Palm	29 September 2014	30 September 2015	Social Democrats	Stockholm Municipality	Lawen Redar
134	Anders Ahlgren	29 September 2014	10 January 2016	Social Democrats	Dalarna County	Peter Helander
143	Erik Ullenhag	29 September 2014	25 August 2016	Liberals	Stockholm Municipality	Nina Lundström
61	Håkan Juholt	29 September 2014	11 September 2016	Social Democrats	Kalmar County	Laila Naraghi
45	Ulf Berg	29 September 2014	12 September 2016	Moderate	Dalarna County	Ann-Britt Åsebol
73	Pia Hallström	29 September 2014	11 October 2016	Moderate	Värmland County	Pål Jonson
16	Jan-Olof Larsson	29 September 2014	9 January 2017	Social Democrats	Västra Götaland County West	Petra Ekerum
47	Margareta Berg Kjellin	29 September 2014	14 februari 2017	Moderate	Gävleborg County	Lars Beckman
74	Hans Unander	29 September 2014	31 mars 2017	Social Democrats	Dalarna County	Patrik Engström
278	Carin Jämtin	29 September 2014	28 May 2017	Social Democrats	Stockholm Municipality	Börje Vestlund
93	Anders Forsberg	29 September 2014	1 June 2017	Sweden Democrats	Malmö Municipality	Heidi Karlsson
228	Hans Linde	29 September 2014	7 June 2017	Left	Göteborg Municipality	Yasmine Posio
172	Åsa Romson	29 September 2014	14 juli 2017	Green	Stockholm Municipality	Pernilla Stålhammar
123	Daniel Sestrajcic	29 September 2014	31 August 2017	Left	Malmö Municipality	Momodou Malcolm Jallow
278	Börje Vestlund	29 May 2017	22 September 2017	Social Democrats	Stockholm Municipality	Teres Lindberg
98	Wiwi-Anne Johansson	29 September 2014	31 October 2017	Left	Västra Götaland County West	Hamza Demir
344	Stig Henriksson	29 September 2014	31 October 2017	Left	Västmanland County	Vasiliki Tsouplaki
343	Lars Eriksson	29 September 2014	20 March 2018	Social Democrats	Västmanland County	Gabriel Wikström
343	Gabriel Wikström	20 March 2018	22 March 2018	Social Democrats	Västmanland County	Åsa Eriksson
19	Berit Högman	29 September 2014	26 March 2018	Social Democrats	Värmland County	Eva-Lena Gustavsson
251	Sara Karlsson	29 September 2014	14 May 2018	Social Democrats	Södermanland County	Jacob Sandgren
251	Jacob Sandgren	14 May 2018	17 May 2018	Social Democrats	Södermanland County	Leif Hård
116	Emma Wallrup	29 September 2014	7 June 2018	Left	Uppsala County	Jeannette Escanilla
