= Skåne County Western =

Swedish national legislative constituency

- Skåne Läns Västra
- Constituency for the Riksdag
- Location of Skåne County Western within Sweden
- Municipality: List: Bjuv; Eslöv; Helsingborg; Höganäs; Höör; Hörby; Landskrona; Svalöv
- County: Skåne
- Population: 327,727 (2025)
- Electorate: 246,258 (2026)
- Area: 2,322 km^{2} (2026)

Current constituency
- Created: 1994
- Seats: 9 (1994–present) (Note: Constituency seats only.)
- Member of the Riksdag: List: Pontus Andersson (SD); Bo Broman (SD); Marcus Friberg (MP); Magnus Haara (C); Niklas Karlsson (S); Linda Lindberg (SD); Ola Möller (S); Umihana Rasovic (V); Mauricio Rojas (L); My Rosell (S); Mats Sander (M); Alexander Svensson (M)
- Created from: List: Fyrstadskretsen; Malmöhus County

Skåne County Western (Swedish: Skåne Läns Västra) is one of the 29 multi-member constituencies of the Riksdag, the national legislature of Sweden. The constituency was established as Malmöhus County North (Swedish: Malmöhus Läns Norra) in 1994 from parts of Fyrstadskretsen and Malmöhus County following the reorganisation of the constituencies in Malmöhus County. It was renamed Skåne County Western in 1998 when the counties of Kristianstad and Malmöhus were merged to create Skåne. The constituency currently consists of the municipalities of Bjuv, Eslöv, Helsingborg, Höganäs, Höör, Hörby, Landskrona and Svalöv. The constituency currently elects nine of the 349 members of the Riksdag using the open party-list proportional representation electoral system. At the 2026 general election it had 246,258 registered electors.

== Electoral system ==
Skåne County Western currently elects nine of the 349 members of the Riksdag using the open party-list proportional representation electoral system. Constituency seats are allocated using the modified Sainte-Laguë method. Only parties that reach the 4% national threshold and parties that receive at least 12% of the vote in the constituency compete for constituency seats. Supplementary levelling seats may also be allocated at the constituency level to parties that reach the 4% national threshold.

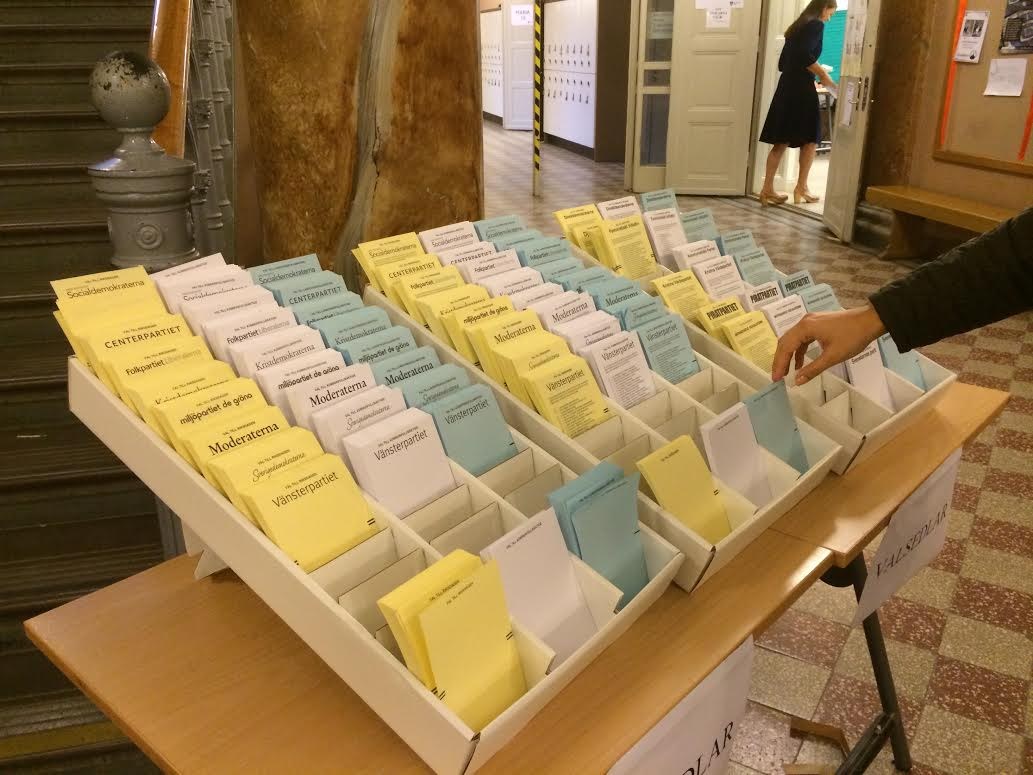
A selection of ballot papers available for voters at the 2014 general election in Stockholm - yellow for the Riksdag, blue for the regional council and white for the municipal council

Prior to 1997 voters could cast any ballot paper they wanted though, it had to contain the name of a party and the name of at least one candidate nominated by that party in the constituency. It was common for parties to hand out ballot papers with their name and list of candidates at the entrance of polling stations. Voters could delete the names of candidates or write-in the names of other candidates but in practice these options weren't used enough by voters to have any significant impact on the results and consequently elections operated as a closed system.

Since 1997, elections in Sweden follow the French model in having separate ballot papers for each party/list in a constituency. There are two ballot papers for each party - a party ballot paper (partivalsedel) with just the name of the party and a name ballot paper (namnvalsedel) with the name of the party and its list of candidates. There are also blank ballot papers (blank valsedel). Voters can initially pick as many ballot papers as they wish and then, in the secrecy of the voting booth, they select a single ballot paper of their choice. If they chose a name ballot paper they have the option of casting a preferential vote for one of their chosen party's candidates. If they chose a blank ballot paper they can write the name of any party including unregistered parties and, optionally, they can write the name of any person as their preferred candidate, even one that does not belong to their chosen party. They then place their chosen ballot paper in an envelope which is placed in the ballot box, discarding all other ballot papers they picked.

Seats won by each party/list in a constituency are allocated to its candidates in order of preference votes (a personal mandate), provided that the candidate has received at least 8% of votes cast for their party in the constituency (5% since January 2011). Any unfilled seats are then allocated to the party's remaining candidates in the order they appear on the party list (a party mandate).

== Election results ==
=== Summary ===
Election	Left V			Social Democrats S			Greens MP			Centre C			Liberals L / FP			Moderates M			Christian Democrats KD			Sweden Democrats SD		
Election	Votes	%	Seats	Votes	%	Seats	Votes	%	Seats	Votes	%	Seats	Votes	%	Seats	Votes	%	Seats	Votes	%	Seats	Votes	%	Seats
2026	15,713	7.82%	1	52,352	26.05%	3	8,803	4.38%	0	10,700	5.32%	0	11,487	5.72%	0	40,449	20.13%	2	10,538	5.24%	0	48,361	24.06%	3
2022	8,832	4.61%	0	52,402	27.34%	3	6,779	3.54%	0	9,524	4.97%	1	8,592	4.48%	0	37,982	19.82%	2	9,055	4.72%	0	55,104	28.75%	3
2018	9,074	4.74%	0	50,041	26.13%	3	6,788	3.54%	0	12,298	6.42%	1	9,930	5.19%	0	40,284	21.04%	2	10,257	5.36%	0	50,069	26.14%	3
2014	6,962	3.83%	0	55,185	30.32%	4	11,032	6.06%	0	8,380	4.60%	0	9,470	5.20%	0	44,558	24.48%	3	5,860	3.22%	0	35,180	19.33%	2
2010	5,847	3.37%	0	49,900	28.77%	3	9,869	5.69%	0	8,164	4.71%	0	13,967	8.05%	1	58,628	33.80%	4	6,989	4.03%	0	17,448	10.06%	1
2006	5,409	3.34%	0	56,580	34.94%	4	5,961	3.68%	0	9,184	5.67%	0	13,757	8.50%	1	46,393	28.65%	4	7,869	4.86%	0	11,549	7.13%	0
2002	8,295	5.51%	0	60,464	40.19%	4	5,015	3.33%	0	6,908	4.59%	0	20,551	13.66%	2	26,420	17.56%	2	12,154	8.08%	1	6,711	4.46%	0
1998	12,347	8.27%	1	55,545	37.21%	4	4,913	3.29%	0	6,227	4.17%	0	6,210	4.16%	0	39,903	26.73%	3	14,963	10.02%	1			
1994	5,672	3.54%	0	75,002	46.75%	5	6,365	3.97%	0	10,887	6.79%	1	8,904	5.55%	0	43,002	26.81%	3	4,541	2.83%	0			

(Excludes levelling seats. Figures in italics represent alliances/joint lists.)

=== Detailed ===
Party has received at least 4% of the vote nationally and is entitled to compete for constituency seats.

==== 2020s ====
===== 2026 =====
Results of the 2026 general election held on 13 September 2026:

Party		Votes per municipality								Total votes	%	Seats		
Party		Bjuv	Eslöv	Helsing- borg	Höga- näs	Höör	Hörby	Lands- krona	Svalöv	Total votes	%	Con.	Lev.	Tot.
Swedish Social Democratic Party	S	2,529	5,595	25,211	4,081	2,389	2,047	8,559	1,941	52,352	26.05%	3	0	3
Sweden Democrats	SD	3,141	5,502	20,258	3,732	2,938	3,507	6,466	2,817	48,361	24.06%	3	0	3
Moderate Party	M	1,417	3,914	19,877	5,038	2,241	1,737	4,845	1,380	40,449	20.13%	2	0	2
Left Party	V	541	1,678	8,805	713	656	380	2,454	486	15,713	7.82%	1	0	1
Liberals	L	292	916	4,933	1,448	539	539	2,394	426	11,487	5.72%	0	1	1
Centre Party	C	225	1,207	4,752	1,565	707	629	1,098	517	10,700	5.32%	0	1	1
Christian Democrats	KD	482	1,116	4,556	1,291	734	733	1,099	527	10,538	5.24%	0	0	0
Green Party	MP	152	1,046	3,730	1,062	942	352	1,041	478	8,803	4.38%	0	1	1
Alternative for Sweden	AfS	39	86	421	53	41	49	127	47	863	0.43%	0	0	0
Örebro Party	ÖP	58	96	298	65	74	40	97	30	758	0.38%	0	0	0
Ambition Sweden	AS	10	21	96	27	19	19	28	5	225	0.11%	0	0	0
Pirate Party	PP	5	35	68	10	13	15	25	9	180	0.09%	0	0	0
Christian Values Party	KrVP	7	13	43	18	9	13	21	4	128	0.06%	0	0	0
Human Rights and Democracy	MoD	1	20	35	12	27	6	9	7	117	0.06%	0	0	0
Citizens' Coalition	MED	4	16	33	19	10	4	4	7	97	0.05%	0	0	0
Communist Party of Sweden	SKP	2	9	29	2	12	9	9	2	74	0.04%	0	0	0
United Voice	ER	1	6	18	3	1	3	1	2	35	0.02%	0	0	0
Direct Democrats	DD	1	6	7	0	1	1	3	0	19	0.01%	0	0	0
Nuance Party	PNy	0	0	7	0	0	0	5	0	12	0.01%	0	0	0
Party for Justice and Equality	PRJ	0	0	0	0	5	1	3	0	9	0.00%	0	0	0
Volt Sweden	Volt	0	0	4	1	1	0	1	0	7	0.00%	0	0	0
Donald Duck Party		0	0	3	0	0	0	2	1	6	0.00%	0	0	0
Unity	ENH	0	1	1	0	0	0	2	1	5	0.00%	0	0	0
Classical Liberal Party	KLP	0	0	1	0	2	0	0	1	4	0.00%	0	0	0
Nordic Resistance Movement	NMR	1	0	1	0	0	0	0	2	4	0.00%	0	0	0
The Push Buttons	Kn	0	0	2	1	0	0	1	0	4	0.00%	0	0	0
Communist Party	K	0	0	3	0	0	0	0	0	3	0.00%	0	0	0
Independent Rural Party	LPo	0	1	1	0	0	0	1	0	3	0.00%	0	0	0
Turning Point Party	PV	0	0	1	2	0	0	0	0	3	0.00%	0	0	0
Free Party		0	1	1	0	0	0	0	0	2	0.00%	0	0	0
Friends of Hemp		0	0	0	0	0	0	2	0	2	0.00%	0	0	0
RegleraAI.nu		0	0	2	0	0	0	0	0	2	0.00%	0	0	0
Vision Party		0	1	1	0	0	0	0	0	2	0.00%	0	0	0
Evil Chicken Party	OKP	0	0	1	0	0	0	0	0	1	0.00%	0	0	0
For the Good of All		0	0	0	1	0	0	0	0	1	0.00%	0	0	0
Jesus		0	0	1	0	0	0	0	0	1	0.00%	0	0	0
Left Sweden		0	1	0	0	0	0	0	0	1	0.00%	0	0	0
Pax		0	0	0	0	1	0	0	0	1	0.00%	0	0	0
Responsible Intelligence in Politics		0	0	1	0	0	0	0	0	1	0.00%	0	0	0
Security Party	TRP	0	0	1	0	0	0	0	0	1	0.00%	0	0	0
Social Liberals		0	0	0	0	1	0	0	0	1	0.00%	0	0	0
Squirrel Party		0	0	0	0	0	0	1	0	1	0.00%	0	0	0
Sweden's National Democratic Party	SNDP	0	0	1	0	0	0	0	0	1	0.00%	0	0	0
Tidö		0	0	0	0	0	0	1	0	1	0.00%	0	0	0
United Sweden		0	0	0	0	0	1	0	0	1	0.00%	0	0	0
Valid votes		8,908	21,287	93,203	19,144	11,363	10,085	28,299	8,690	200,979	100.00%	9	3	12
Blank votes		98	234	697	162	132	116	241	105	1,785	0.88%			
Rejected votes – unregistered parties		2	6	18	1	2	1	8	0	38	0.02%			
Rejected votes – other		4	18	72	34	7	3	39	8	185	0.09%			
Total polled		9,012	21,545	93,990	19,341	11,504	10,205	28,587	8,803	202,987	82.43%			
Registered electors		11,431	25,785	115,614	22,109	13,333	12,058	35,507	10,421	246,258				
Turnout		78.84%	83.56%	81.30%	87.48%	86.28%	84.63%	80.51%	84.47%	82.43%				

The following candidates were elected:

- Constituency seats (personal mandates) - Niklas Karlsson (S), 3,188 votes; and Umihana Rasovic (V), 1,310 votes.
- Constituency seats (party mandates) - Bo Broman (SD), 122 votes; Pontus Andersson (SD), 121 votes; Linda Lindberg (SD), 254 votes; Ola Möller (S), 1,731 votes; My Rosell (S), 1,298 votes; Mats Sander (M), 1,206 votes; and Alexander Svensson (M), 1,875 votes.
- Levelling seats (personal mandates) - Marcus Friberg (MP), 452 votes.
- Levelling seats (party mandates) - Magnus Haara (C), 338 votes; and Mauricio Rojas (L), 186 votes.

===== 2022 =====
Results of the 2022 general election held on 11 September 2022:

Party		Votes per municipality								Total votes	%	Seats		
Party		Bjuv	Eslöv	Helsing- borg	Höga- näs	Höör	Hörby	Lands- krona	Svalöv	Total votes	%	Con.	Lev.	Tot.
Sweden Democrats	SD	3,644	6,340	23,051	4,375	3,340	3,933	7,308	3,113	55,104	28.75%	3	0	3
Swedish Social Democratic Party	S	2,347	5,853	24,659	4,505	2,523	2,129	8,286	2,100	52,402	27.34%	3	0	3
Moderate Party	M	1,304	3,666	18,937	4,658	1,923	1,642	4,623	1,229	37,982	19.82%	2	0	2
Centre Party	C	255	1,059	4,350	1,223	579	565	1,002	491	9,524	4.97%	1	0	1
Christian Democrats	KD	356	970	3,925	1,058	649	692	954	451	9,055	4.72%	0	0	0
Left Party	V	319	975	4,363	579	566	376	1,275	379	8,832	4.61%	0	0	0
Liberals	L	155	747	3,855	1,099	471	373	1,626	266	8,592	4.48%	0	1	1
Green Party	MP	118	742	2,986	834	677	283	828	311	6,779	3.54%	0	0	0
Nuance Party	PNy	84	101	755	6	4	6	544	46	1,546	0.81%	0	0	0
Alternative for Sweden	AfS	35	69	200	45	37	28	59	37	510	0.27%	0	0	0
Citizens' Coalition	MED	7	45	135	28	45	14	26	11	311	0.16%	0	0	0
Pirate Party	PP	15	50	76	21	12	18	27	11	230	0.12%	0	0	0
Human Rights and Democracy	MoD	1	12	102	19	18	1	20	3	176	0.09%	0	0	0
The Push Buttons	Kn	7	11	60	25	15	5	23	9	155	0.08%	0	0	0
Christian Values Party	KrVP	1	9	36	18	9	16	19	6	114	0.06%	0	0	0
Feminist Initiative	FI	4	4	29	9	8	3	4	7	68	0.04%	0	0	0
Climate Alliance	KA	0	5	20	0	6	0	5	3	39	0.02%	0	0	0
Independent Rural Party	LPo	0	7	3	11	4	1	5	1	32	0.02%	0	0	0
Direct Democrats	DD	2	4	11	2	1	1	6	1	28	0.01%	0	0	0
Nordic Resistance Movement	NMR	2	3	11	2	0	0	4	4	26	0.01%	0	0	0
Sweden Out of the EU/ Free Justice Party	FRP	0	1	0	23	1	0	0	0	25	0.01%	0	0	0
Communist Party of Sweden	SKP	0	3	9	4	5	1	0	2	24	0.01%	0	0	0
Unity	ENH	1	2	3	4	0	6	2	1	19	0.01%	0	0	0
Turning Point Party	PV	0	2	10	0	3	0	0	1	16	0.01%	0	0	0
My Sweden		2	0	13	0	0	0	0	0	15	0.01%	0	0	0
Basic Income Party	BASIP	0	0	10	0	2	0	1	0	13	0.01%	0	0	0
Classical Liberal Party	KLP	0	0	2	0	2	0	2	1	7	0.00%	0	0	0
Volt Sweden	Volt	0	0	5	0	1	0	1	0	7	0.00%	0	0	0
Hard Line Sweden		1	0	4	0	0	0	1	0	6	0.00%	0	0	0
Socialist Welfare Party	S-V	0	0	5	0	0	0	0	0	5	0.00%	0	0	0
Scania Party	SKÅ	0	3	0	0	0	0	0	1	4	0.00%	0	0	0
Security Party	TRP	0	0	0	0	3	0	0	0	3	0.00%	0	0	0
United Democratic Party		0	0	0	0	0	0	2	0	2	0.00%	0	0	0
Evil Chicken Party	OKP	0	0	1	0	0	0	0	0	1	0.00%	0	0	0
Freedom Party		0	0	0	0	0	1	0	0	1	0.00%	0	0	0
National Socialist Reformist Party		0	0	0	0	0	0	1	0	1	0.00%	0	0	0
Neotechnocrats		1	0	0	0	0	0	0	0	1	0.00%	0	0	0
Valid votes		8,661	20,683	87,626	18,548	10,904	10,094	26,654	8,485	191,655	100.00%	9	1	10
Blank votes		107	226	830	134	120	101	326	122	1,966	1.01%			
Rejected votes – unregistered parties		2	6	23	4	10	1	4	1	51	0.03%			
Rejected votes – other		6	11	71	13	8	3	45	8	165	0.09%			
Total polled		8,776	20,926	88,550	18,699	11,042	10,199	27,029	8,616	193,837	81.89%			
Registered electors		10,979	24,959	110,550	21,308	12,804	11,943	34,011	10,158	236,712				
Turnout		79.93%	83.84%	80.10%	87.76%	86.24%	85.40%	79.47%	84.82%	81.89%				

The following candidates were elected:

- Constituency seats (personal mandates) - Jonny Cato (C), 483 votes; and Niklas Karlsson (S), 2,798 votes.
- Constituency seats (party mandates) - Yasmine Bladelius (S), 1,204 votes; Bo Broman (SD), 152 votes; Ann-Charlotte Hammar Johnsson (M), 282 votes; Ulrika Heindorff (M), 1,787 votes; Linda Lindberg (SD), 214 votes; Ola Möller (S), 1,625 votes; and Carina Ståhl Herrstedt (SD), 112 votes.
- Levelling seats (party mandates) - Mauricio Rojas (L), 100 votes.

Permanent substitutions:

- Carina Ståhl Herrstedt (SD) resigned on 28 February 2025 and was replaced by Pia Trollehjelm (SD) on 1 March 2025.
- Yasmine Bladelius (S) resigned on 8 March 2025 and was replaced by Agneta Nilsson (S) on 9 March 2025.
- Jonny Cato (C) resigned on 29 November 2025 and was replaced by Madeleine Atlas (C) on 30 November 2025.

==== 2010s ====
===== 2018 =====
Results of the 2018 general election held on 9 September 2018:

Party		Votes per municipality								Total votes	%	Seats		
Party		Bjuv	Eslöv	Helsing- borg	Höga- näs	Höör	Hörby	Lands- krona	Svalöv	Total votes	%	Con.	Lev.	Tot.
Sweden Democrats	SD	3,318	5,780	21,048	3,603	3,024	3,566	6,800	2,930	50,069	26.14%	3	0	3
Swedish Social Democratic Party	S	2,627	5,673	23,562	3,591	2,074	1,957	8,591	1,966	50,041	26.13%	3	0	3
Moderate Party	M	1,241	3,644	20,811	4,813	2,029	1,740	4,722	1,284	40,284	21.04%	2	0	2
Centre Party	C	312	1,510	5,299	1,513	833	839	1,196	796	12,298	6.42%	1	0	1
Christian Democrats	KD	363	999	4,706	1,321	690	660	1,084	434	10,257	5.36%	0	1	1
Liberals	L	226	902	4,488	1,173	588	435	1,803	315	9,930	5.19%	0	1	1
Left Party	V	314	1,072	4,206	599	664	449	1,374	396	9,074	4.74%	0	0	0
Green Party	MP	158	682	3,228	784	605	256	854	221	6,788	3.54%	0	0	0
Feminist Initiative	FI	17	88	344	60	67	50	133	60	819	0.43%	0	0	0
Alternative for Sweden	AfS	34	78	281	35	34	28	63	39	592	0.31%	0	0	0
Citizens' Coalition	MED	14	63	158	34	34	20	36	14	373	0.19%	0	0	0
Pirate Party	PP	8	44	81	24	21	15	41	20	254	0.13%	0	0	0
Direct Democrats	DD	6	11	73	11	9	6	12	7	135	0.07%	0	0	0
Animals' Party	DjuP	0	61	21	4	5	9	6	19	125	0.07%	0	0	0
Security Party	TRP	0	4	62	5	19	2	26	1	119	0.06%	0	0	0
Unity	ENH	1	18	38	6	24	9	13	10	119	0.06%	0	0	0
Independent Rural Party	LPo	4	11	5	9	10	13	0	13	65	0.03%	0	0	0
Nordic Resistance Movement	NMR	3	6	16	4	1	3	6	2	41	0.02%	0	0	0
Christian Values Party	KrVP	2	0	7	13	0	3	11	0	36	0.02%	0	0	0
Classical Liberal Party	KLP	0	10	11	1	0	2	9	3	36	0.02%	0	0	0
Basic Income Party	BASIP	0	3	4	7	1	1	0	2	18	0.01%	0	0	0
Initiative	INI	0	0	4	2	1	1	1	0	9	0.00%	0	0	0
Communist Party of Sweden	SKP	0	0	5	0	2	0	0	0	7	0.00%	0	0	0
Scania Party	SKÅ	0	2	1	0	2	0	0	0	5	0.00%	0	0	0
Parties not on the ballot	ÖVR	1	4	3	1	0	0	2	1	12	0.01%	0	0	0
Valid votes		8,649	20,665	88,462	17,613	10,737	10,064	26,783	8,533	191,506	100.00%	9	2	11
Blank votes		93	240	675	127	117	93	253	88	1,686	0.87%			
Rejected votes – unregistered parties		3	2	12	6	4	2	6	1	36	0.02%			
Rejected votes – other		7	10	36	12	5	1	15	6	92	0.05%			
Total polled		8,752	20,917	89,185	17,758	10,863	10,160	27,057	8,628	193,320	85.21%			
Registered electors		10,581	24,227	105,779	19,975	12,325	11,722	32,424	9,843	226,876				
Turnout		82.71%	86.34%	84.31%	88.90%	88.14%	86.67%	83.45%	87.66%	85.21%				

The following candidates were elected:

- Constituency seats (personal mandates) - Ulrika Heindorff (M), 2,110 votes; and Niklas Karlsson (S), 3,131 votes.
- Constituency seats (party mandates) - Jonny Cato (C), 529 votes; Ann-Charlotte Hammar Johnsson (M), 473 votes; Ebba Hermansson (SD), 4 votes; Yasmine Larsson (S), 1,665 votes; Linda Lindberg (SD), 157 votes; Ola Möller (S), 1,864 votes; and Carina Ståhl Herrstedt (SD), 158 votes.
- Levelling seats (personal mandates) - Torkild Strandberg (L), 640 votes.
- Levelling seats (party mandates) - Michael Anefur (KD), 9 votes.

Permanent substitutions:

- Torkild Strandberg (L) resigned on 25 September 2018 and was replaced by Tina Acketoft (L) on 26 September 2018.
- Ebba Hermansson (SD) resigned on 16 December 2021 and was replaced by Pontus Andersson (SD) on 17 December 2021.

===== 2014 =====
Results of the 2014 general election held on 14 September 2014:

Party		Votes per municipality								Total votes	%	Seats		
Party		Bjuv	Eslöv	Helsing- borg	Höga- näs	Höör	Hörby	Lands- krona	Svalöv	Total votes	%	Con.	Lev.	Tot.
Swedish Social Democratic Party	S	3,425	6,556	24,663	3,706	2,579	2,367	9,468	2,421	55,185	30.32%	4	0	4
Moderate Party	M	1,425	3,999	22,803	5,709	2,263	1,848	5,044	1,467	44,558	24.48%	3	0	3
Sweden Democrats	SD	2,173	4,290	14,555	2,488	2,122	2,604	4,768	2,180	35,180	19.33%	2	0	2
Green Party	MP	312	1,147	5,612	1,065	785	458	1,267	386	11,032	6.06%	0	1	1
Liberal People's Party	FP	221	871	4,384	1,073	486	383	1,767	285	9,470	5.20%	0	1	1
Centre Party	C	269	1,334	2,812	892	704	853	717	799	8,380	4.60%	0	0	0
Left Party	V	296	745	3,422	497	425	259	1,063	255	6,962	3.83%	0	0	0
Christian Democrats	KD	188	462	2,859	906	381	347	502	215	5,860	3.22%	0	0	0
Feminist Initiative	FI	84	400	1,606	351	238	184	493	181	3,537	1.94%	0	0	0
Pirate Party	PP	21	109	327	64	35	28	110	33	727	0.40%	0	0	0
Swedish Senior Citizen Interest Party	SPI	1	9	140	51	25	119	64	6	415	0.23%	0	0	0
Unity	ENH	3	11	70	13	30	22	34	6	189	0.10%	0	0	0
Party of the Swedes	SVP	8	21	88	13	9	10	15	10	174	0.10%	0	0	0
Animals' Party	DjuP	2	11	30	3	13	9	5	4	77	0.04%	0	0	0
Progressive Party		34	0	5	2	0	0	3	2	46	0.03%	0	0	0
Christian Values Party	KrVP	2	6	18	4	1	0	6	1	38	0.02%	0	0	0
Direct Democrats		0	2	21	0	0	2	4	0	29	0.02%	0	0	0
Classical Liberal Party	KLP	1	0	15	2	3	1	6	0	28	0.02%	0	0	0
Communist Party of Sweden	SKP	0	2	7	0	0	0	0	1	10	0.01%	0	0	0
Independent Rural Party	LBPo	0	4	1	0	0	5	0	0	10	0.01%	0	0	0
Health Party		0	1	1	0	2	0	0	0	4	0.00%	0	0	0
Socialist Justice Party	RS	0	0	2	0	0	0	2	0	4	0.00%	0	0	0
Animal Owner Party	Däp	0	0	3	0	0	0	0	0	3	0.00%	0	0	0
Republicans		0	0	0	0	0	0	2	0	2	0.00%	0	0	0
Scania Party	SKÅ	0	0	0	1	0	0	1	0	2	0.00%	0	0	0
European Workers Party	EAP	1	0	0	0	0	0	0	0	1	0.00%	0	0	0
Parties not on the ballot		4	6	38	6	7	4	13	8	86	0.05%	0	0	0
Valid votes		8,470	19,986	83,482	16,846	10,108	9,503	25,354	8,260	182,009	100.00%	9	2	11
Blank votes		117	237	781	147	123	132	238	88	1,863	1.01%			
Rejected votes – other		4	8	20	4	4	1	14	1	56	0.03%			
Total polled		8,591	20,231	84,283	16,997	10,235	9,636	25,606	8,349	183,928	83.51%			
Registered electors		10,602	23,964	101,934	19,372	11,837	11,469	31,279	9,797	220,254				
Turnout		81.03%	84.42%	82.68%	87.74%	86.47%	84.02%	81.86%	85.22%	83.51%				

The following candidates were elected:

- Constituency seats (personal mandates) - Kent Härstedt (S), 4,338 votes; and Niklas Karlsson (S), 3,119 votes.
- Constituency seats (party mandates) - Aron Emilsson (SD), 3 votes; Lena Emilsson (S), 849 votes; Thomas Finnborg (M), 1,137 votes; Ann-Charlotte Hammar Johnsson (M), 699 votes; Jonas Jacobsson Gjörtler (M), 1,403 votes; Yasmine Larsson (S), 1,619 votes; and Roger Richthoff (SD), 1 vote.
- Levelling seats (personal mandates) - Torkild Strandberg (FP), 525 votes.
- Levelling seats (party mandates) - Rickard Persson (MP), 272 votes.

Permanent substitutions:

- Torkild Strandberg (FP) resigned on 18 December 2014 and was replaced by Tina Acketoft (FP) on 19 December 2014.

===== 2010 =====
Results of the 2010 general election held on 19 September 2010:

Party		Votes per municipality								Total votes	%	Seats		
Party		Bjuv	Eslöv	Helsing- borg	Höga- näs	Höör	Hörby	Lands- krona	Svalöv	Total votes	%	Con.	Lev.	Tot.
Moderate Party	M	2,124	5,650	28,639	6,823	3,300	3,048	6,877	2,167	58,628	33.80%	4	0	4
Swedish Social Democratic Party	S	3,332	6,138	21,910	3,258	2,172	2,076	8,730	2,284	49,900	28.77%	3	0	3
Sweden Democrats	SD	1,223	2,258	7,115	1,026	1,097	1,282	2,408	1,039	17,448	10.06%	1	0	1
Liberal People's Party	FP	405	1,330	6,234	1,459	687	549	2,849	454	13,967	8.05%	1	0	1
Green Party	MP	286	908	5,167	947	707	416	1,058	380	9,869	5.69%	0	1	1
Centre Party	C	305	1,324	2,649	862	594	901	605	924	8,164	4.71%	0	0	0
Christian Democrats	KD	219	540	3,450	1,079	439	388	602	272	6,989	4.03%	0	0	0
Left Party	V	262	610	2,693	415	356	238	999	274	5,847	3.37%	0	0	0
Swedish Senior Citizen Interest Party	SPI	11	115	492	144	78	205	22	30	1,097	0.63%	0	0	0
Pirate Party	PP	22	121	449	57	57	48	133	42	929	0.54%	0	0	0
Feminist Initiative	FI	14	60	193	30	27	17	52	11	404	0.23%	0	0	0
Freedom Party		4	0	20	3	1	1	7	7	43	0.02%	0	0	0
Party of the Swedes	SVP	0	0	7	0	0	0	5	21	33	0.02%	0	0	0
National Democrats	ND	1	2	19	1	2	0	4	0	29	0.02%	0	0	0
Classical Liberal Party	KLP	0	3	14	0	0	0	2	1	20	0.01%	0	0	0
Unity	ENH	0	1	5	2	3	0	0	1	12	0.01%	0	0	0
Communist Party of Sweden	SKP	0	0	8	0	0	1	0	0	9	0.01%	0	0	0
Swedish National Democratic Party	SNDP	1	0	1	1	1	1	1	1	7	0.00%	0	0	0
Rural Democrats		0	0	1	1	0	1	1	0	4	0.00%	0	0	0
Active Democracy		0	0	3	0	0	0	0	0	3	0.00%	0	0	0
Alliance Party / Citizen's Voice	ALP	0	0	0	0	1	0	0	0	1	0.00%	0	0	0
European Workers Party	EAP	0	0	0	1	0	0	0	0	1	0.00%	0	0	0
Health Care Party	Sjvåp	0	0	0	0	1	0	0	0	1	0.00%	0	0	0
Nordic Union		1	0	0	0	0	0	0	0	1	0.00%	0	0	0
Republicans		0	0	0	0	0	0	1	0	1	0.00%	0	0	0
Scania Party	SKÅ	0	0	0	0	1	0	0	0	1	0.00%	0	0	0
Socialist Justice Party	RS	0	0	1	0	0	0	0	0	1	0.00%	0	0	0
Spirits Party		0	0	0	0	0	0	1	0	1	0.00%	0	0	0
Parties not on the ballot		2	4	11	1	0	2	4	1	25	0.01%	0	0	0
Valid votes		8,212	19,064	79,081	16,110	9,524	9,174	24,361	7,909	173,435	100.00%	9	1	10
Blank votes		102	239	857	167	122	110	224	100	1,921	1.09%			
Rejected votes – other		6	8	41	7	2	6	14	6	90	0.05%			
Total polled		8,320	19,311	79,979	16,284	9,648	9,290	24,599	8,015	175,446	82.15%			
Registered electors		10,463	23,349	98,176	18,964	11,537	11,356	30,056	9,679	213,580				
Turnout		79.52%	82.71%	81.46%	85.87%	83.63%	81.81%	81.84%	82.81%	82.15%				

The following candidates were elected:

- Constituency seats (personal mandates) - Kent Härstedt (S), 4,737 votes.
- Constituency seats (party mandates) - Ann Arleklo (S), 1,088 votes; Thomas Finnborg (M), 1,538 votes; Ann-Charlotte Hammar Johnsson (M), 769 votes; Cristina Husmark Pehrsson (M), 2,603 votes; Jonas Jacobsson (M), 1,522 votes; Anders Karlsson (S), 2,700 votes; Torkild Strandberg (FP), 994 votes; and Tony Wiklander (SD), 35 votes.
- Levelling seats (party mandates) - Magnus Ehrencrona (MP), 317 votes.

Permanent substitutions:

- Torkild Strandberg (FP) resigned on 20 December 2010 and was replaced by Tina Acketoft (FP) on 21 December 2010.

==== 2000s ====
===== 2006 =====
Results of the 2006 general election held on 17 September 2006:

Party		Votes per municipality								Total votes	%	Seats		
Party		Bjuv	Eslöv	Helsing- borg	Höga- näs	Höör	Hörby	Lands- krona	Svalöv	Total votes	%	Con.	Lev.	Tot.
Swedish Social Democratic Party	S	3,673	7,117	24,494	4,117	2,658	2,451	9,398	2,672	56,580	34.94%	4	0	4
Moderate Party	M	1,578	3,933	23,235	5,637	2,442	2,274	5,581	1,713	46,393	28.65%	4	0	4
Liberal People's Party	FP	370	1,249	6,389	1,273	624	599	2,809	444	13,757	8.50%	1	0	1
Sweden Democrats	SD	785	1,490	4,668	632	664	681	1,900	729	11,549	7.13%	0	0	0
Centre Party	C	336	1,649	2,814	874	742	1,052	687	1,030	9,184	5.67%	0	1	1
Christian Democrats	KD	326	682	3,699	1,180	491	537	633	321	7,869	4.86%	0	0	0
Green Party	MP	152	555	3,038	604	446	265	673	228	5,961	3.68%	0	0	0
Left Party	V	227	624	2,547	357	332	208	889	225	5,409	3.34%	0	0	0
Swedish Senior Citizen Interest Party	SPI	71	131	1,595	168	115	295	149	25	2,549	1.57%	0	0	0
Pirate Party	PP	49	108	454	94	47	33	113	44	942	0.58%	0	0	0
Feminist Initiative	FI	23	91	398	99	37	56	103	24	831	0.51%	0	0	0
June List	JL	21	67	242	46	28	42	74	25	545	0.34%	0	0	0
Unity	ENH	0	9	65	11	22	4	13	4	128	0.08%	0	0	0
Health Care Party	Sjvåp	4	19	44	15	5	2	14	1	104	0.06%	0	0	0
National Socialist Front	NSF	2	0	22	1	1	1	2	0	29	0.02%	0	0	0
People's Will		0	0	13	2	2	2	5	0	24	0.01%	0	0	0
National Democrats	ND	2	1	13	3	0	1	2	1	23	0.01%	0	0	0
New Future	NYF	0	0	6	0	0	0	1	0	7	0.00%	0	0	0
Classical Liberal Party	KLP	0	0	5	0	1	0	0	0	6	0.00%	0	0	0
Socialist Justice Party	RS	0	1	5	0	0	0	0	0	6	0.00%	0	0	0
Communist Party of Sweden	SKP	0	0	0	0	0	1	2	0	3	0.00%	0	0	0
Active Democracy		0	1	0	0	0	0	1	0	2	0.00%	0	0	0
Nordic Union		0	0	2	0	0	0	0	0	2	0.00%	0	0	0
Alliance Party	ALP	0	0	0	0	0	0	1	0	1	0.00%	0	0	0
Sweden Out of the EU / Free Justice Party	UT/FRP	0	0	1	0	0	0	0	0	1	0.00%	0	0	0
Unique Party		0	0	4	0	0	0	1	0	5	0.00%	0	0	0
Parties not on the ballot		0	2	12	1	0	0	5	1	21	0.01%	0	0	0
Valid votes		7,619	17,729	73,765	15,114	8,657	8,504	23,056	7,487	161,931	100.00%	9	1	10
Blank votes		146	326	1,185	214	140	169	303	142	2,625	1.59%			
Rejected votes – other		4	7	54	7	4	4	10	4	94	0.06%			
Total polled		7,769	18,062	75,004	15,335	8,801	8,677	23,369	7,633	164,650	80.05%			
Registered electors		10,107	22,393	94,195	18,315	10,942	11,011	29,228	9,488	205,679				
Turnout		76.87%	80.66%	79.63%	83.73%	80.43%	78.80%	79.95%	80.45%	80.05%				

The following candidates were elected:

- Constituency seats (party mandates) - Ann Arleklo (S), 1,453 votes; Peter Danielsson (M), 1,964 votes; Christin Hagberg (S), 277 votes; Kent Härstedt (S), 4,522 votes; Cristina Husmark Pehrsson (M), 2,077 votes; Anders Karlsson (S), 2,235 votes; Mats Sander (M), 831 votes; Torkild Strandberg (FP), 1,026 votes; and Marie Weibull Kornias (M), 607 votes.
- Levelling seats (party mandates) - Lennart Pettersson (C), 537 votes.

Permanent substitutions:

- Peter Danielsson (M) resigned on 8 November 2006 and was replaced by Sven Yngve Persson (M) on 10 November 2006.
- Torkild Strandberg (FP) resigned on 10 January 2007 and was replaced by Tina Acketoft (FP) on 11 January 2007.

===== 2002 =====
Results of the 2002 general election held on 15 September 2002:

Party		Votes per municipality								Total votes	%	Seats		
Party		Bjuv	Eslöv	Helsing- borg	Höga- näs	Höör	Hörby	Lands- krona	Svalöv	Total votes	%	Con.	Lev.	Tot.
Swedish Social Democratic Party	S	3,865	7,363	26,664	4,675	2,817	2,626	9,485	2,969	60,464	40.19%	4	0	4
Moderate Party	M	939	2,272	12,846	3,259	1,349	1,140	3,512	1,103	26,420	17.56%	2	0	2
Liberal People's Party	FP	625	1,750	10,323	2,309	1,045	901	2,902	696	20,551	13.66%	2	0	2
Christian Democrats	KD	529	952	5,770	1,646	722	785	1,224	526	12,154	8.08%	1	0	1
Left Party	V	425	844	4,036	673	391	281	1,348	297	8,295	5.51%	0	1	1
Centre Party	C	266	1,520	1,452	567	609	1,115	460	919	6,908	4.59%	0	0	0
Sweden Democrats	SD	361	734	2,767	385	352	435	1,322	355	6,711	4.46%	0	0	0
Green Party	MP	157	510	2,441	509	377	273	542	206	5,015	3.33%	0	0	0
Swedish Senior Citizen Interest Party	SPI	35	131	974	189	263	202	447	75	2,316	1.54%	0	0	0
Scania Party	SKÅ	22	67	113	18	17	27	93	87	444	0.30%	0	0	0
Unity	ENH	3	2	20	1	3	1	3	1	34	0.02%	0	0	0
Socialist Justice Party	RS	1	0	14	0	0	0	0	0	15	0.01%	0	0	0
Skåne Federalists		0	1	8	0	0	4	0	0	13	0.01%	0	0	0
European Workers Party	EAP	0	0	0	1	0	0	5	0	6	0.00%	0	0	0
The Communists	KOMM	0	0	4	0	0	0	0	0	4	0.00%	0	0	0
Socialist Party	SOC.P	0	0	1	0	0	1	2	0	4	0.00%	0	0	0
New Future	NYF	0	1	0	0	2	0	0	0	3	0.00%	0	0	0
Swedish National Democratic Party	SNDP	0	0	0	2	0	0	0	0	2	0.00%	0	0	0
God-Trolls-Witches-Beings and Cosmic Powers Party		0	0	1	0	0	0	0	0	1	0.00%	0	0	0
Other parties	ÖVR	26	11	947	43	5	14	37	6	1,089	0.72%	0	0	0
Valid votes		7,254	16,158	68,381	14,277	7,952	7,805	21,382	7,240	150,449	100.00%	9	1	10
Rejected votes		155	330	1,263	244	137	157	305	104	2,695	1.76%			
Total polled		7,409	16,488	69,644	14,521	8,089	7,962	21,687	7,344	153,144	77.31%			
Registered electors		9,957	21,239	91,007	17,624	10,430	10,495	28,141	9,190	198,083				
Turnout		74.41%	77.63%	76.53%	82.39%	77.56%	75.86%	77.07%	79.91%	77.31%				

The following candidates were elected:

- Constituency seats (party mandates) - Tina Acketoft (FP), 715 votes; Peter Danielsson (M), 1,321 votes; Kent Härstedt (S), 4,613 votes; Cristina Husmark Pehrsson (M), 1,846 votes; Anders Karlsson (S), 3,001 votes; Kenneth Lantz (KD), 1,303 votes; Annika Nilsson (S), 1,754 votes; Christin Nilsson (S), 507 votes; and Torkild Strandberg (FP), 994 votes.
- Levelling seats (personal mandates) - Tasso Stafilidis (V), 852 votes.

==== 1990s ====
===== 1998 =====
Results of the 1998 general election held on 20 September 1998:

Party		Votes per municipality								Total votes	%	Seats		
Party		Bjuv	Eslöv	Helsing- borg	Höga- näs	Höör	Hörby	Lands- krona	Svalöv	Total votes	%	Con.	Lev.	Tot.
Swedish Social Democratic Party	S	3,765	7,042	23,355	4,364	2,466	2,408	9,297	2,848	55,545	37.21%	4	0	4
Moderate Party	M	1,468	3,459	19,343	4,775	2,013	1,871	5,304	1,670	39,903	26.73%	3	0	3
Christian Democrats	KD	657	1,443	6,683	1,972	898	1,205	1,401	704	14,963	10.02%	1	0	1
Left Party	V	789	1,280	6,176	910	541	448	1,732	471	12,347	8.27%	1	0	1
Centre Party	C	298	1,366	1,175	424	536	1,054	442	932	6,227	4.17%	0	0	0
Liberal People's Party	FP	228	494	3,090	815	258	293	804	228	6,210	4.16%	0	0	0
Green Party	MP	171	511	2,184	476	405	343	609	214	4,913	3.29%	0	0	0
Other parties		267	506	5,016	559	646	330	1,594	260	9,178	6.15%	0	0	0
Valid votes		7,643	16,101	67,022	14,295	7,763	7,952	21,183	7,327	149,286	100.00%	9	0	9
Rejected votes		178	360	1,666	280	170	218	446	174	3,492	2.29%			
Total polled		7,821	16,461	68,688	14,575	7,933	8,170	21,629	7,501	152,778	79.23%			
Registered electors		9,960	20,684	87,813	17,448	10,001	10,396	27,169	9,352	192,823				
Turnout		78.52%	79.58%	78.22%	83.53%	79.32%	78.59%	79.61%	80.21%	79.23%				

The following candidates were elected:

- Constituency seats (personal mandates) - Kent Härstedt (S), 9,970 votes; Anders Karlsson (S), 4,648 votes; and Tasso Stafilidis (V), 1,164 votes.
- Constituency seats (party mandates) - Anna Åkerhielm (M), 1,543 votes; Jan Backman (M), 733 votes; Cristina Husmark Pehrsson (M), 921 votes; Kenneth Lantz (KD), 335 votes; Annika Nilsson (S), 1,608 votes; and Bengt Silfverstrand (S), 1,417 votes.

===== 1994 =====
Results of the 1994 general election held on 18 September 1994:

Party		Votes per municipality								Total votes	%	Seats		
Party		Bjuv	Eslöv	Helsing- borg	Höga- näs	Höör	Hörby	Lands- krona	Svalöv	Total votes	%	Con.	Lev.	Tot.
Swedish Social Democratic Party	S	5,245	9,049	31,981	5,836	3,150	2,941	13,036	3,764	75,002	46.75%	5	0	5
Moderate Party	M	1,633	4,108	20,360	5,092	2,283	2,099	5,679	1,748	43,002	26.81%	3	0	3
Centre Party	C	503	1,967	3,000	952	992	1,505	791	1,177	10,887	6.79%	1	0	1
Liberal People's Party	FP	327	684	4,638	1,111	419	382	1,047	296	8,904	5.55%	0	1	1
Green Party	MP	220	618	2,952	699	467	379	709	321	6,365	3.97%	0	0	0
Left Party	V	295	567	2,886	448	255	187	825	209	5,672	3.54%	0	0	0
Christian Democratic Unity	KDS	165	396	1,971	629	342	458	379	201	4,541	2.83%	0	0	0
New Democracy	NyD	115	356	801	190	123	211	462	133	2,391	1.49%	0	0	0
Other parties		112	269	2,136	126	223	436	217	132	3,651	2.28%	0	0	0
Valid votes		8,615	18,014	70,725	15,083	8,254	8,598	23,145	7,981	160,415	100.00%	9	1	10
Rejected votes		109	259	1,009	164	125	129	336	120	2,251	1.38%			
Total polled		8,724	18,273	71,734	15,247	8,379	8,727	23,481	8,101	162,666	85.76%			
Registered electors		10,064	21,393	84,489	17,260	9,803	10,333	27,028	9,302	189,672				
Turnout		86.69%	85.42%	84.90%	88.34%	85.47%	84.46%	86.88%	87.09%	85.76%				

The following candidates were elected: Anna Åkerhielm (M); Jan Andersson (S); Jan Backman (M); Lena Larsson (S); Annika Nilsson (S), 1,608 votes; Bo Nilsson (S); Helena Nilsson (C); Siw Persson (FP); Bengt Silfverstrand (S); and Peter Weibull Bernström (M).

Permanent substitutions:

- Jan Andersson (S) resigned on 8 October 1995 and was replaced by Christin Nilsson (S) on 9 October 1995.
- Helena Nilsson (C) resigned on 31 August 1998 and was replaced by Anna Corshammar-Bojerud (C) on 1 September 1998.
