= Agneta Nilsson =

Swedish politician (born 1956)

Member of the Riksdag
- In office 9 March 2025 – 28 September 2026
- Preceded by: Yasmine Bladelius
- Constituency: Skåne County Western

Personal details
- Born: 1956 (age 69–70)
- Party: Social Democratic Party

Gunnel Agneta Nilsson (born 1956) is a Swedish politician and former Member of the Riksdag. A member of the Social Democratic Party, she represented Skåne County Western from March 2025 to September 2026.

Nilsson was born in 1956. She is a retired childcare worker and lives in Eslöv Municipality.

Nilsson became politically active when she joined the Swedish Social Democratic Youth League (SSU). She is a member of the municipal council in Eslöv. She was a substitute member of the Riksdag for Ola Möller between October 20203 and November 2023. She was appointed to the Riksdag in March 2025 following the resignation of Yasmine Bladelius. She did not seek re-election at the 2026 general election.

Electoral history of Agneta Nilsson
Election	Constituency	Party	List no.	Votes	%	Result
2022 general	Skåne County Western	Social Democratic Party	4	799	1.52%	Not elected
2022 local	Eslöv Municipality	Social Democratic Party	6	151	2.44%	Elected - party mandate
