= Madeleine Atlas =

Swedish politician (born 1968)

Member of the Riksdag
- Incumbent
- Assumed office 30 November 2025
- Preceded by: Jonny Cato
- Constituency: Skåne County Western

Personal details
- Born: 2 May 1968 (age 58) Staffanstorp parish, Sweden
- Party: Centre Party

Madeleine Ingeborg Atlas (born 2 May 1968) is a Swedish politician from the Centre Party. She has been a member of the Riksdag since 2025. She was a candidate in the 2022 Swedish general election.

== See also ==
- List of members of the Riksdag, 2022–2026
