= Mikael Larsson (politician) =

Swedish politician (born 1989)

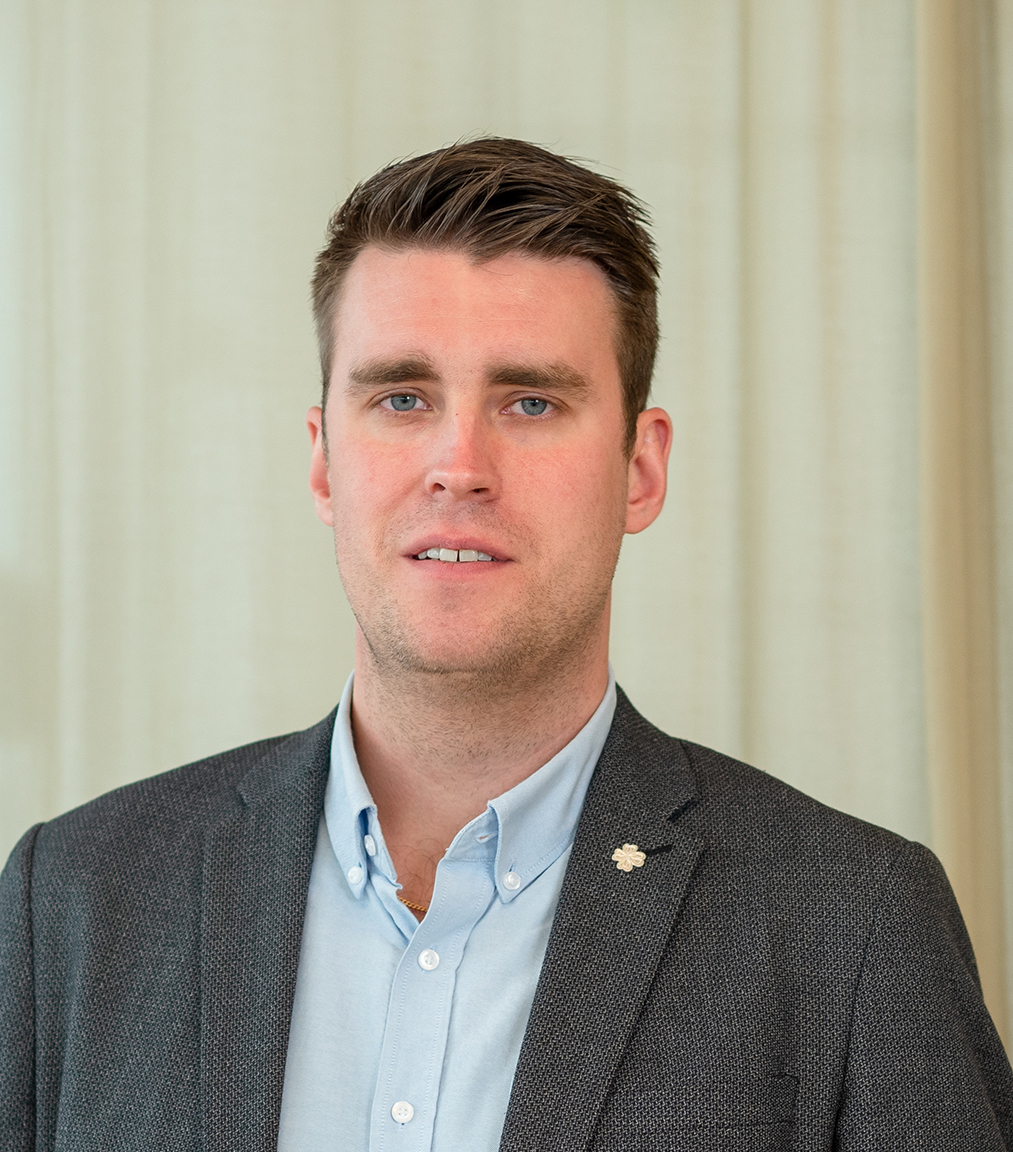

Member of the Riksdag
- Incumbent
- Assumed office 2018
- Constituency: Västra Götaland County South

Personal details
- Born: Mikael Robin Larsson; 5 January 1989 (age 37) Älvsborg County, Sweden
- Party: Centre Party
- Spouse: Jonny Cato (m. 2023)

Mikael Robin Larsson (born 5 January 1989) is a Swedish politician from the Centre Party. He has been a member of the Riksdag since 2018, elected for the Västra Götaland County South constituency.

== Political career ==
In the Riksdag, Larsson has been a member of the Defence Committee since 2022. Larsson is also a member of the Council of Members and is or has been a deputy member of, among others, the Defence Committee, the Transport and Communications Committee and the Foreign Affairs Committee. He has also been the Centre Party's representative on the Försvarsberedningen since 2022.

Larsson has been active in municipal politics in Mark Municipality from 2010 to 2018 and has served on the municipal council, the municipal executive board, the social welfare committee and as chairman of the social welfare committee's social committee. He has previously worked as an ombudsman for the Centre Party in Sjuhäradsbygden and as a business developer at the Studieförbundet Vuxenskolan. Larsson was also the district chairman of Centre Party Youth in Västra Götaland from 2014 to 2015. During the years 2006 to 2019, he served on the board of the Björketorps Bygdegårdsförening and was its chairman from 2009 to 2019. Larsson has also served on the Sjuhärads Bygdegårdsdistrict district board between 2009 and 2020, where he was chairman from 2014 to 2020. He was awarded the Bygdegårdars silver needle in 2020 and the Bygdegårdars gold needle with plaque in 2022.

Other assignments that Larsson has are elected representative in the Sjuhärad Savings Bank Foundation, Chairman of the Church Council in Västra Marks Parish and Chairman of the National Association of Rural Communities.

== Personal life ==
Mikael Larsson has been married to the Centre Party member of parliament Jonny Cato since 15 July 2023.

== See also ==
- List of members of the Riksdag, 2022–2026
- List of members of the Riksdag, 2018–2022
