= Committee on Defence (Sweden) =

Swedish parliamentary committee

The (Parliamentary) Committee on Defence (Swedish: Försvarsutskottet, FöU) is a parliamentary committee in the Swedish Riksdag. The committee's areas of responsibility concern the military (insofar as such matters do not belong to the preparation of any other committee), the role of the population in defence policies (total defence), along with coordination inside the total defence. The committee also treats questions regarding the coast guard.

The committee's speaker is Peter Hultqvist from the Social Democratic Party since 2022 and the vice-speaker is Lars Wistedt from the Sweden Democrats since 2023.

== List of chairs for the committee ==
Name	Period	Political party
Per Petersson i Gäddvik	1971–1985	Moderate Party
Lennart Blom i Stockholm	1985–1987	Moderate Party
Arne Andersson	1987–1998	Moderate Party
Henrik Landerholm	1998–2002	Moderate Party
Eskil Erlandsson	2002–2006	Centre Party
Ulrica Messing	2006–2007	Social Democratic Party
Anders Karlsson	2007–2010	Social Democratic Party
Håkan Juholt	2010–2011	Social Democratic Party
Peter Hultqvist	2011–2014	Social Democratic Party
Allan Widman	2014–2018	Liberals
Niklas Karlsson	2018–2019	Social Democratic Party
Beatrice Ask	2019	Moderate Party
Pål Jonson	2020–2022	Moderate Party
Helén Pettersson	2022	Social Democratic Party
Peter Hultqvist	2022–	Social Democratic Party

== List of deputy chairs for the committee ==
Name	Period	Political party
Eric Holmqvist	1981–1982	Social Democratic Party
Olle Göransson	1982–1988	Social Democratic Party
Roland Brännström	1988–1991	Social Democratic Party
Sture Ericson	1991–1994	Social Democratic Party
Britt Bohlin	1994–1996	Social Democratic Party
Sven Lundberg	1996–1998	Social Democratic Party
Tone Tingsgård	1998–2006	Social Democratic Party
Rolf Gunnarsson	2006–2010	Moderate Party
Cecilia Widegren	2010–2014	Moderate Party
Åsa Lindestam	2014–2018	Social Democratic Party
Beatrice Ask	2018–2019	Moderate Party
Niklas Karlsson	2019–2022	Social Democratic Party
Sven-Olof Sällström	2022–2023	Sweden Democrats
Lars Wistedt	2023–2024	Sweden Democrats
Matheus Enholm	2025–	Sweden Democrats
