= Magnus Ehrencrona =

Swedish politician (born 1978)

Member of the Riksdag
- In office 4 October 2010 – 29 September 2014
- Constituency: Skåne County West

Personal details
- Born: 1978 (age 47–48)
- Party: Green Party

Karl Magnus Ehrencrona (born 1978) is a Swedish politician and former member of the Riksdag, the national legislature. A member of the Green Party, he represented Skåne County West between October 2010 and September 2014.
