= Alexander Svensson =

Swedish politician (born 1995)

Member of the Riksdag
- Incumbent
- Assumed office 28 September 2026
- Constituency: Skåne County Western

Personal details
- Born: 31 October 1995 (age 30)
- Party: Moderate Party

Alexander Svensson (born 31 October 1995) is a Swedish politician who was elected member of the Riksdag in 2026. He has been a municipal councillor of Helsingborg since 2022.
