= Umihana Rasovic =

Swedish politician (born 1986)

Member of the Riksdag
- Incumbent
- Assumed office 28 September 2026
- Constituency: Skåne County Western

Personal details
- Born: 1986 (age 39–40) Yugoslavia
- Party: Left Party

Umihana Rasovic (born 1986) is a Swedish politician for the Left Party. She has been a member of the Riksdag since 2026, elected for the Skåne County Western constituency.

== Biography ==
Rasovic was born in 1986 in the former Yugoslavia. She is of Bosniak descent and originally from Sjenica. She lives in Eslöv and has a bachelor's degree in international migration and ethnic relations. Rasovic has previously worked as a nurse and employment agent. She has later worked as deputy head of the labor market unit in the municipality of Eslöv.

Rasovic was the chair of the Left Party Skåne from 2019 to 2023. She has represented the Left Party in the Eslöv municipal council, the Eslöv upper secondary and adult education board, and the Skåne regional council and service board.

In the 2022 Swedish general election, Rasovic ran for the Left Party in the Skåne County Western constituency and received 698 personal votes, corresponding to 7.90 percent of the party's votes in the constituency.

In the 2024 European Parliament elections, Rasovic was in fifth place on the Left Party's candidate list.

Rasovic ran again for the Riksdag in the 2026 Swedish general election. She was elected as an ordinary member of parliament for the Skåne County Western constituency. She became the first member elected for her party in the constituency since 1998.

== See also ==
- List of members of the Riksdag, 2026–2030
