= Marcus Friberg =

Swedish politician (born 1987)

Member of the Riksdag
- Incumbent
- Assumed office 28 September 2026
- Constituency: Skåne County Western

Personal details
- Born: 6 June 1987 (age 39)
- Party: Green Party

Marcus Tommy Johan Friberg (born 6 June 1987) is a Swedish politician who was elected member of the Riksdag in 2026. He has served as chairman of the executive committee of the Green Party since 2022.
