= My Rosell =

Swedish politician (born 1984)

- Rosell in October 2026

Member of the Riksdag
- Incumbent
- Assumed office 28 September 2026
- Constituency: Skåne County Western

Personal details
- Born: 1984 (age 41–42)
- Party: Social Democratic Party

My Alexandra Rosell (born 1984) is a Swedish politician and Member of the Riksdag. A member of the Social Democratic Party, she has represented Skåne County Western since September 2026.

Rosell was born in 1984.

Rosell was a member of the municipal council in Helsingborg. She was elected to the Riksdag at the 2026 general election.
