= Magnus Haara =

Swedish politician (born 1972)

Member of the Riksdag
- Incumbent
- Assumed office 28 September 2026
- Constituency: Skåne County Western

Personal details
- Born: 1972 (age 53–54) Tornedalen
- Party: Centre Party

Magnus Haara (born 1972) is a Swedish lawyer and politician from the Centre Party. He has been a member of the Riksdag since 2026, elected for the Skåne County Western constituency.

== Biography ==
Haara was born in Tornedalen and lives in Höör Municipality. He has at least three years of post-secondary education and has worked in leadership, law and politics. The Centre Party has described his profession as a lawyer.

Haara has held political positions for the Centre Party since 1995. He has, among other things, been vice chairman of the Centre Party's district organization in Höör.

Ahead of the 2026 Swedish general election, Haara was in first place on the Centre Party's parliamentary list in the Skåne County Western constituency. He was elected to the Riksdag for the constituency and took office as a full member on 28 September 2026.

== See also ==
- List of members of the Riksdag, 2026–2030
