= Lena Emilsson =

Swedish politician (born 1957)

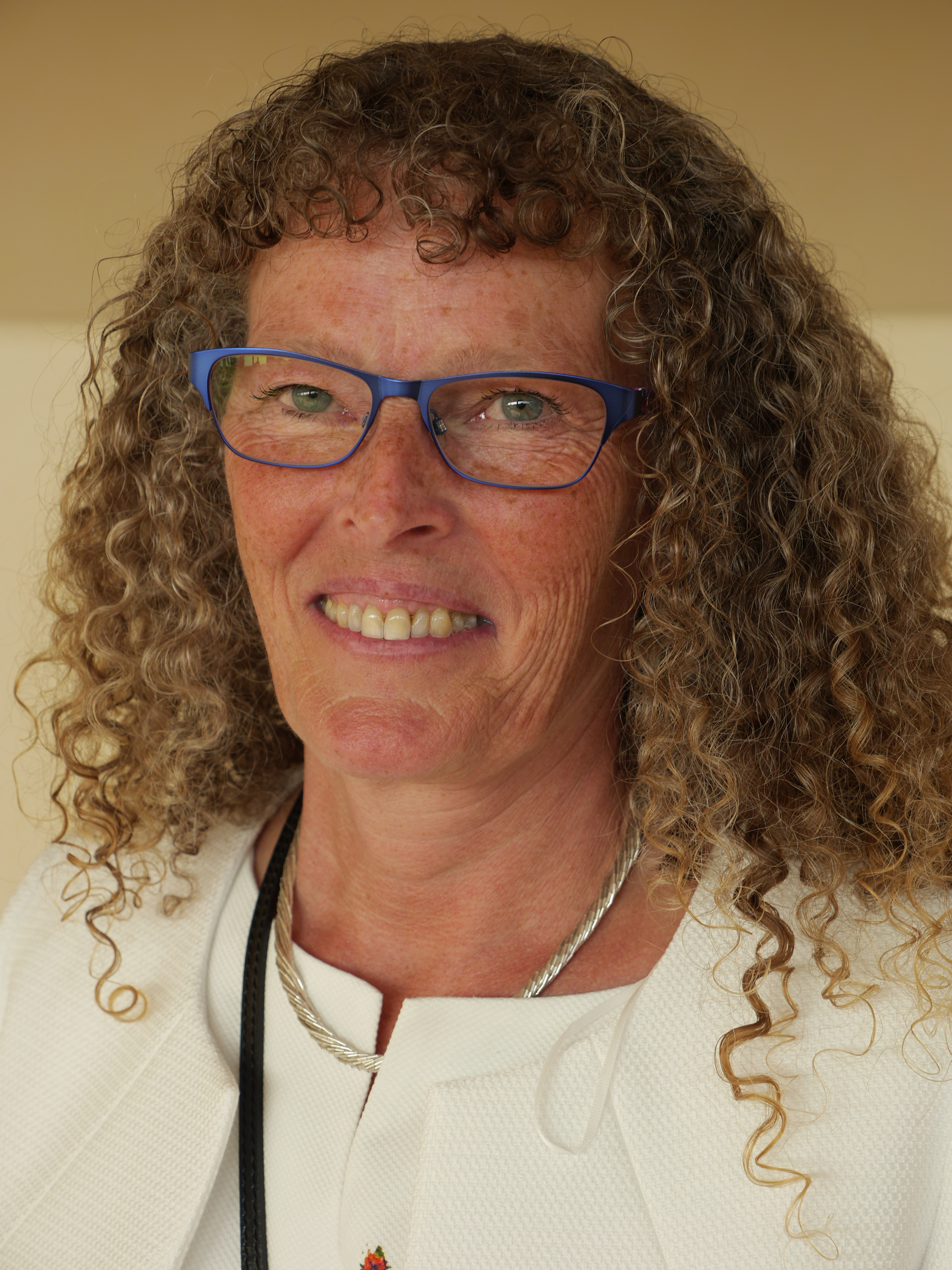
- Born: 1957 (age 68–69)
- Occupation: Politician
- Known for: Member of the Riksdag

Lena Emilsson (born 1957) is a Swedish Social Democratic Party politician.

She was elected member of the Riksdag for the period 2014–2018, from the Skåne Western constituency.
