= Ola Möller (politician) =

Swedish politician (born 1983)

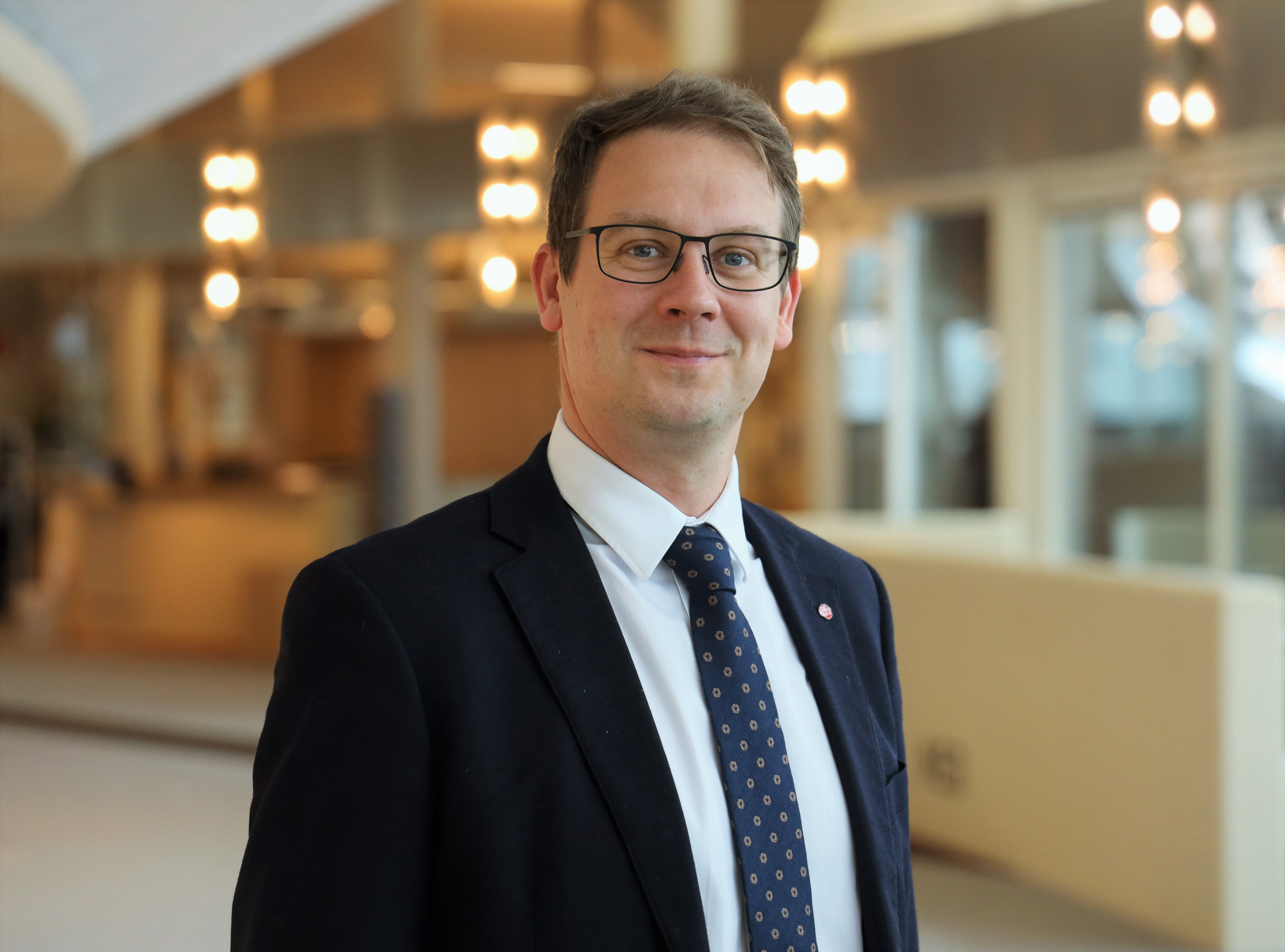
- Möller in May 2021

Member of the Riksdag
- Incumbent
- Assumed office 24 September 2018
- Constituency: Skåne County West

Personal details
- Born: Ola Patrik Bertil Möller; 1983 (age 42–43)
- Party: Social Democratic Party
- Education: Lund University

Ola Patrik Bertil Möller (born 1983) is a Swedish politician and member of the Riksdag, the national legislature. A member of the Social Democratic Party, he has represented Skåne County West since September 2018.

Möller has a degree from Lund University. He has had various jobs including warehouse worker, restaurant assistant, salesperson and teacher.
