= Ann-Charlotte Hammar Johnsson =

Swedish politician (born 1966)

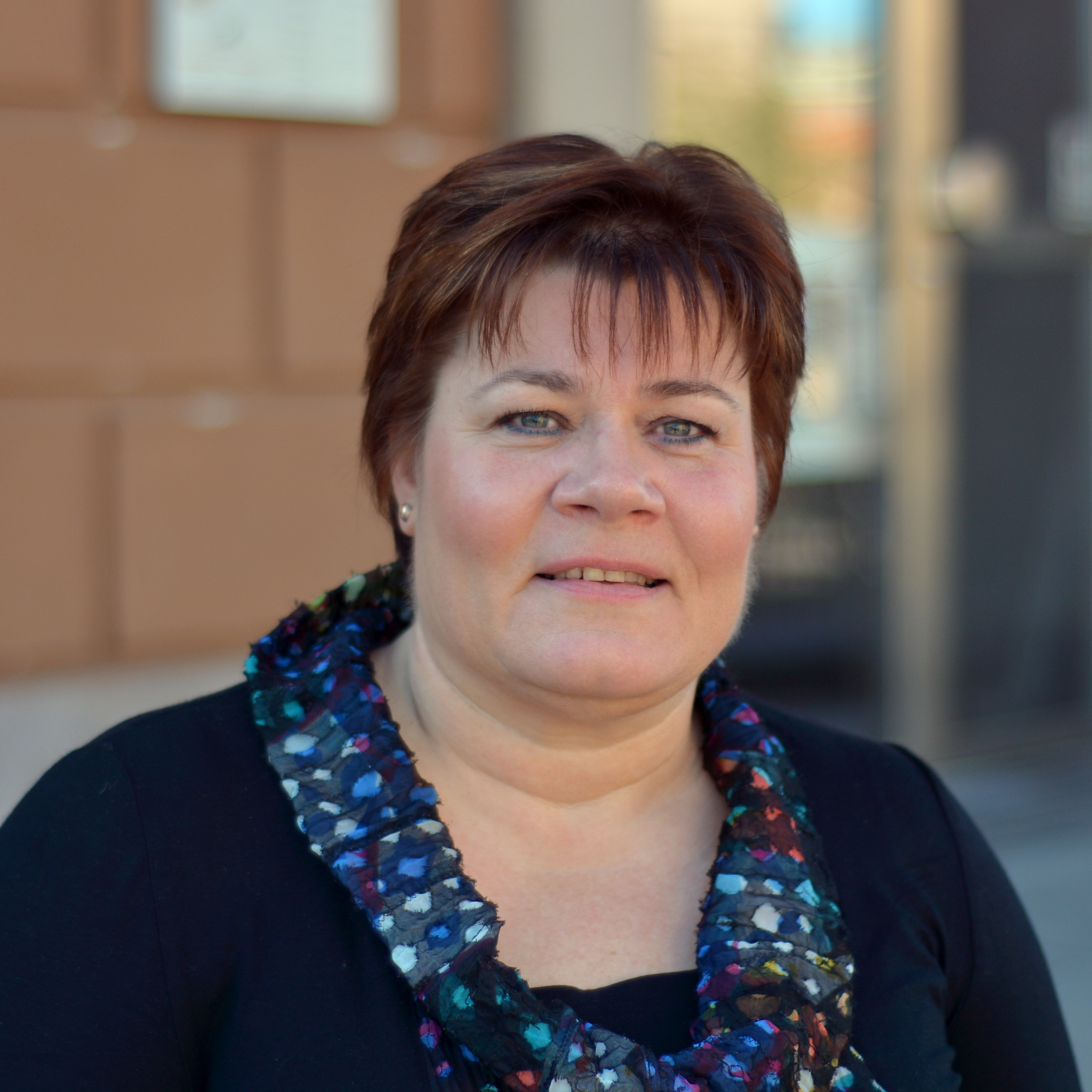

member of the Riksdag
- Incumbent
- Assumed office 2006

Personal details
- Political party: Moderate Party

Ann-Charlotte Hammar Johnsson, born in 1966, is a Swedish politician of the Moderate Party. She has been a member of the Riksdag since 2006, replacing Cristina Husmark Pehrsson due to Husmark Pehrsson's service as the Minister for Social Insurance.
