= Ewa Björling =

Swedish politician (born 1961)

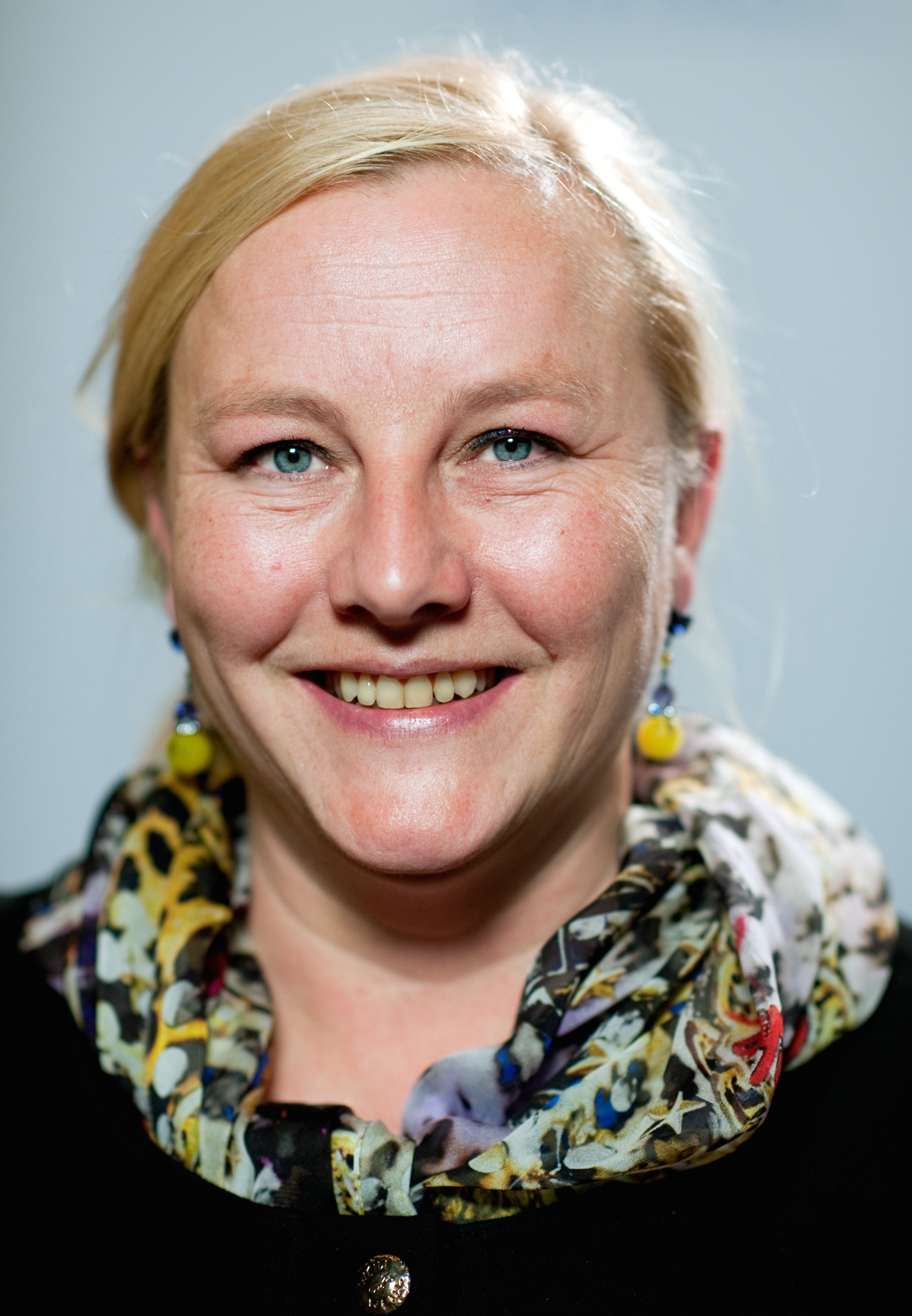

Minister for Foreign Trade
- In office 12 September 2007 – 3 October 2014
- Prime Minister: Fredrik Reinfeldt
- Preceded by: Sten Tolgfors
- Succeeded by: Mikael Damberg

Minister for Nordic Cooperation
- In office 5 October 2010 – 3 October 2014
- Prime Minister: Fredrik Reinfeldt
- Preceded by: Cristina Husmark Pehrsson
- Succeeded by: Kristina Persson

Member of the Swedish Riksdag for Stockholm County
- In office 30 September 2002 – 16 October 2014

Personal details
- Born: 3 May 1961 (age 65)
- Party: Moderate Party
- Children: 2
- Education: Karolinska Institute
- Profession: Physician/Dentist

Ewa Helena Björling (born 3 May 1961) is a Swedish former politician and a member of the Moderate Party. She served as Minister for Foreign Trade from 2007 to 2014 and as Minister for Nordic Cooperation from 2010 to 2014 in the Swedish Government. She was a member of the Swedish Riksdag for Stockholm County from 2002 to 2014.

On 16 October 2014, she submitted her resignation from the Riksdag and announced that she will retire from politics.

== Prior career ==
Ewa Björling is a dentist, Doctor of Medicine and a docent in virology. Prior to her election to the Swedish parliament in 2002, she worked as a lecturer at Karolinska Institutet in Stockholm. She was also a member of the municipal council in Ekerö Municipality from 1999 to 2006, and served as its chairman from 2005 to 2006. She was elected a member of parliament in 2002 and served in the parliament's Committee on Foreign Affairs. She was also a substitute in the Committee on the Constitution, the Committee on Education and the Advisory Council on Foreign Affairs.

She was a member of the board of the Swedish International Development Cooperation Agency from 2003 to 2007. She was also chairman of the Swedish National Council for Coordination of Efforts Against HIV/AIDS in 2007, and Europe's representative in the Inter-Parliamentary Union's working group on HIV/AIDS. Björling has promoted the use of contraception in Malta, a country which maintains solid links to the Roman Catholic Church.

== Minister for Foreign Trade ==
In November 2012, Björling traveled with two Swedish trade delegations to discuss increasing bi-lateral trade between Sweden and war-torn country of Myanmar, despite an existing EU arms embargo against Myanmar. Björling was later questioned by the Swedish Parliament regarding the discovery of Swedish made Carl Gustav recoilless rifles found in Myanmar in December 2012.

Following the 2010 general election, Björling also took office as Minister for Nordic Cooperation. She made mining one of the areas of Nordic cooperation.

== Awards ==
In 2006, Björling was awarded with the "Jerusalem Prize" from the Zionist Federation in Sweden. The award is given to persons who has shown "extraordinary support for Israel, Jerusalem and Zionism".

== Personal life ==
Ewa Björling is married and has two children. She lives on the island of Ekerö west of Stockholm.

Government offices
Preceded by Sten Tolgfors	Minister for Foreign Trade; 2007–2014	Succeeded by Mikael Damberg
Preceded by Cristina Husmark Pehrsson	Minister for Nordic Cooperation; 2010–2014	Succeeded by Kristina Persson
