= Niklas Karlsson =

Swedish politician (born 1974)

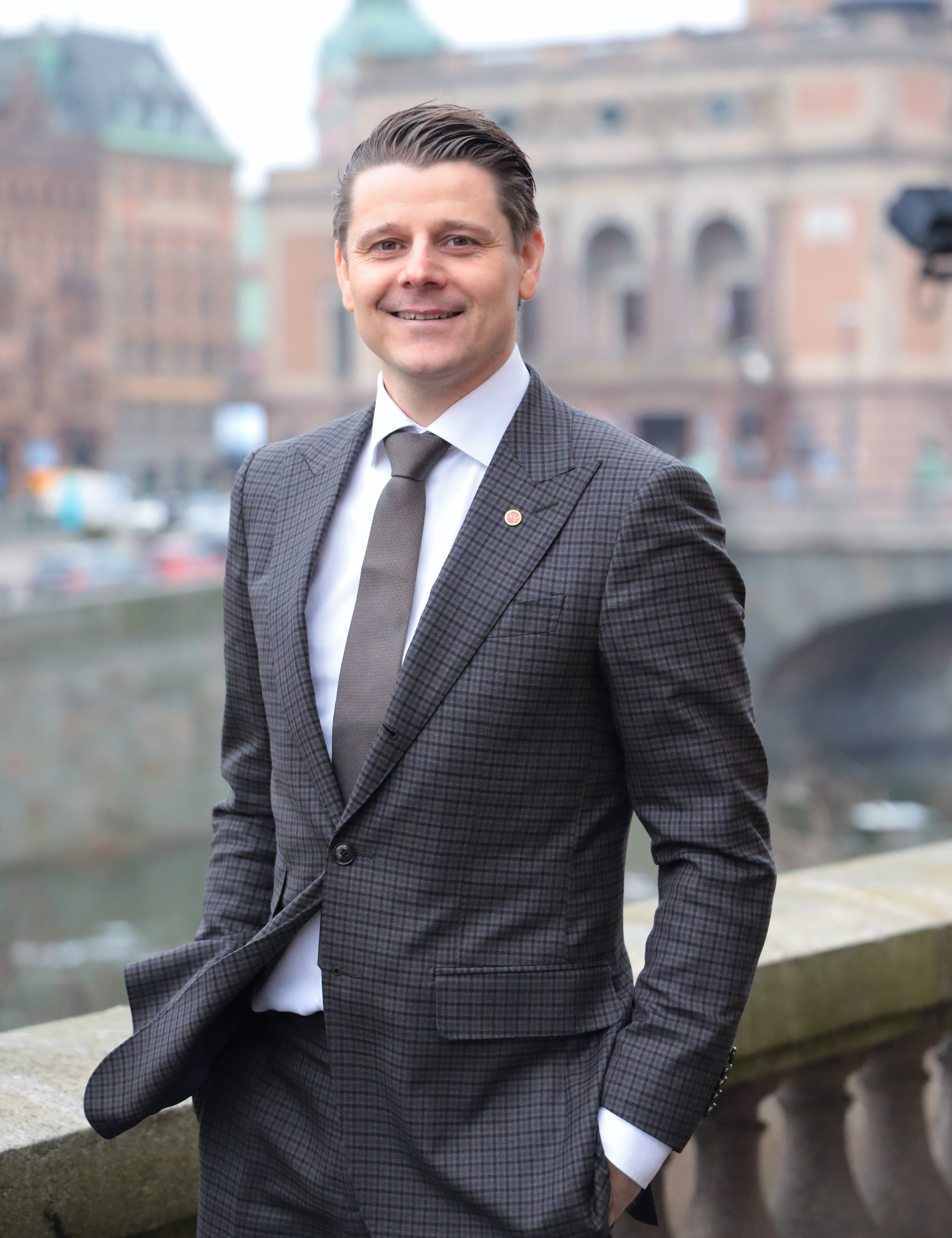
- Karlsson in October 2021

Member of the Riksdag
- Incumbent
- Assumed office 29 September 2014
- Constituency: Skåne County West

Personal details
- Born: Niklas Jörgen Karlsson; 1974 (age 51–52)
- Party: Social Democratic Party

Military service
- Allegiance: Sweden
- Branch/service: Swedish Army
- Unit: Wendes Artillery Regiment

Niklas Jörgen Karlsson (born 1974) is a Swedish politician and member of the Riksdag, the national legislature. A member of the Social Democratic Party, he has represented Skåne County West since September 2014.

Karlsson is the son of politician Anders Karlsson. He was educated in Landskrona and Lund University. He was a sergeant in the Wendes Artillery Regiment. He has been a member of the municipal council in Landskrona Municipality since 1994.
