= Tina Ghasemi =

Swedish politician (born 1985)

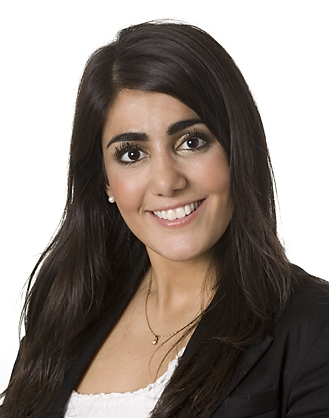

member of the Riksdag
- In office 2014–2018

Representative of the Parliamentary Assembly of the Council of Europe
- In office 2014–2017

Personal details
- Party: Moderate Party
- Occupation: lobbyist

Tina Ghasemi (born 1985) is a Swedish politician for the Moderate Party and member of the Riksdagen between 2014 and 2018. Since 2021, she works as Head of Public Policy for the company Voi.
