= Bo Broman =

Swedish politician (born 1969)

Bo Broman SD
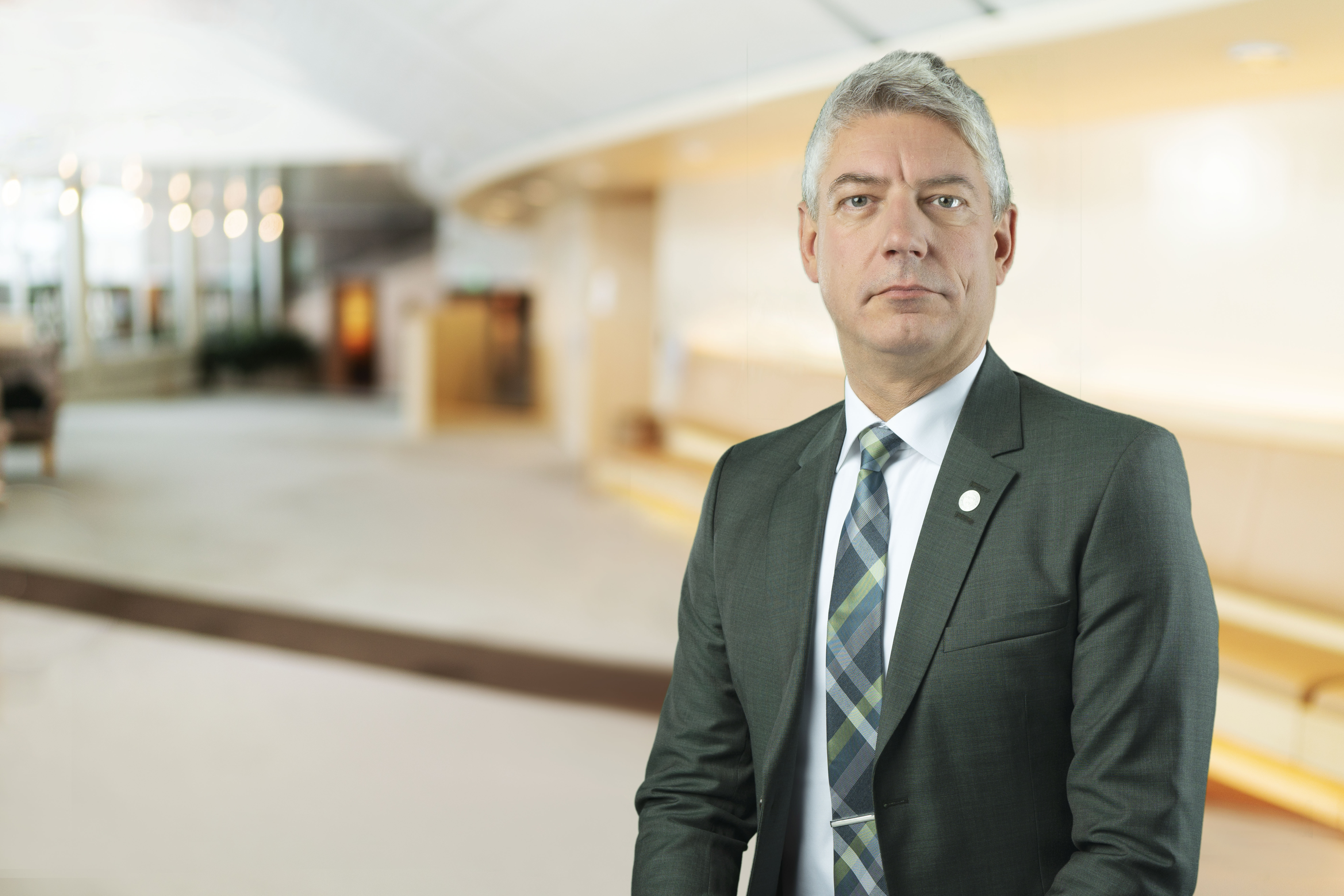
- Bo Broman's official portrait Picture: Sveriges riksdag

Member of the Swedish Parliament for Stockholm County
- Incumbent
- Assumed office 24 September 2018

Personal details
- Born: 11 May 1969 (age 57) Eslöv, Skåne County, Sweden
- Party: Sweden Democrats
- Parents: Göran Broman; Eva Broman
- Education: Lunds University
- Occupation: Politician, businessman

Bo Göran Rickard Broman (born 11 May 1969) is a Swedish business entrepreneur and politician who is a member of the Riksdag for the Sweden Democrats party.

== Biography ==
Broman was born in Eslöv. He studied law, computer technology and economics at Lunds University and worked in the business sector. He also managed a variety of ventures, including corporate management of the Medborgarhuset and Trollenäs Castle. For a period, he also owned and operated the Stensson Hotel in Eslöv.

He was the Sweden Democrats' finance chief and during the 2018 Swedish general election was elected Riksdag, the Swedish parliament for the Stockholm County. Broman has cited support for tougher policies on crime, security and opposition to the European Union as his reasons for standing for the SD. In parliament, Broman sits on the EU Committee and is a member of the council for the Sveriges riksbank.

== Personal life ==
Broman is openly gay, making him the first openly LGBT parliamentary candidate to be elected to the Riksdag for the Sweden Democrats.
