= Jonny Cato =

Swedish politician (born 1994)

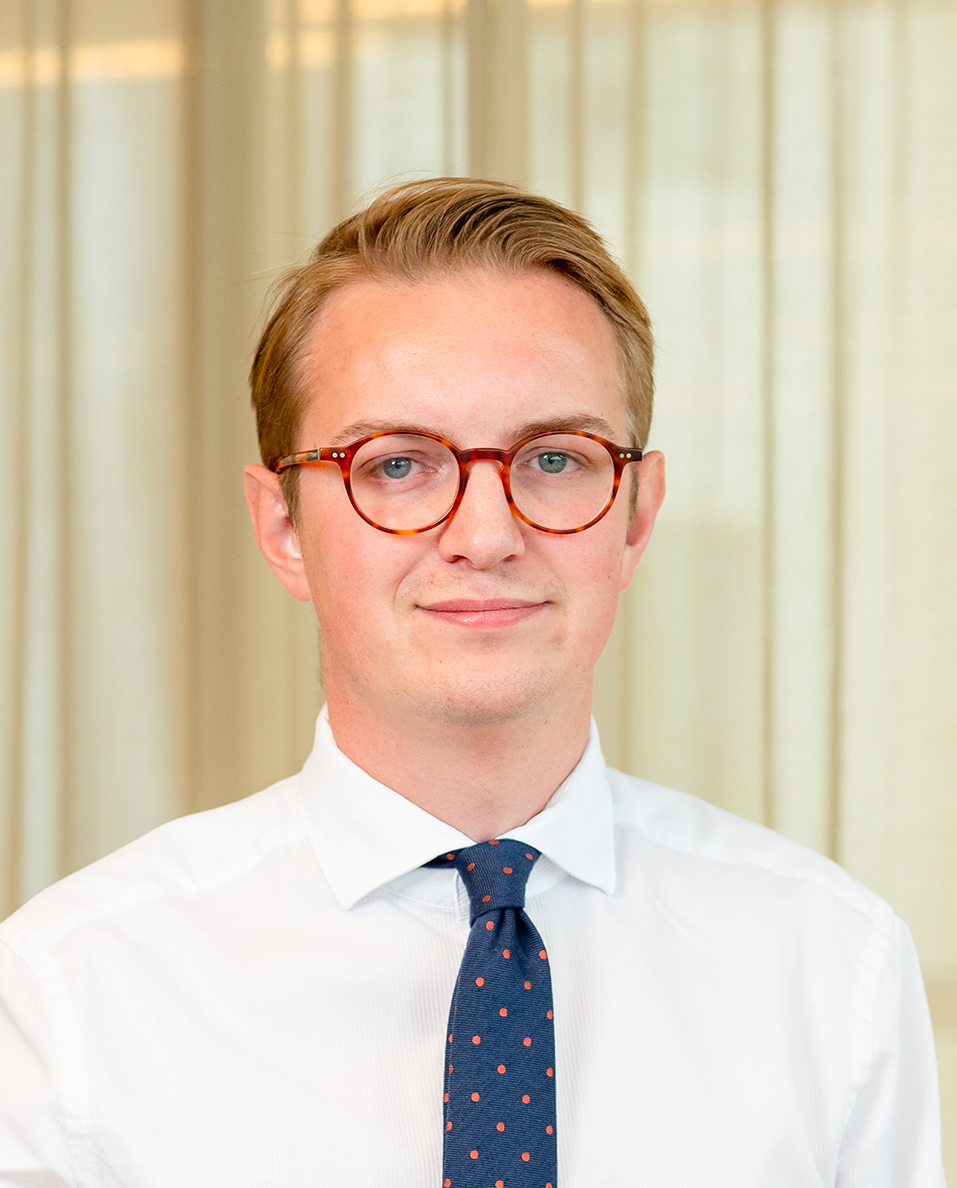
- Cato in 2019

Member of the Riksdag
- Incumbent
- Assumed office 24 September 2018
- Constituency: Skåne Western

Personal details
- Born: 1994 (age 31–32)
- Party: Centre Party
- Spouse: Mikael Larsson (m. 2023)

Jonny Cato (born 1994) is a Swedish politician. Since September 2018, he serves as a Member of the Riksdag representing the constituency of Skåne Western. He was also elected as a Member of the Riksdag in September 2022. He is affiliated with the Centre Party.
