= Per Klarberg =

Swedish politician (born 1965)

Member of the Riksdag
- In office 2014–2018
- Constituency: Västra Götaland County

Personal details
- Born: 6 April 1965 (age 61) Smygehamn
- Party: Sweden Democrats

Per -Olof Sigfrid Klarberg (born 6 April 1965) is a Swedish politician of the Sweden Democrats party.

Klarberg was born in Smygehamn and worked as a train driver by profession. He is also a member of the board for the Port of Trelleborg. Klarberg was elected to city council in Trelleborg municipality in for the Sweden Democrats 2002 and currently serves as the second vice chairman of Trelleborg City Council. He is also the SD's spokesman on public transport and transportation safety.

Klarberg was appointed to the Riksdag in 2014 as a temporary MP.
