= Annika Nilsson =

Swedish politician (born 1971)

Annika Nilsson (born 1971) is a Swedish social democratic politician. She was a member of the Riksdag from 1994 to 2006.
