= Rickard Persson =

Swedish politician (born 1959)

Member of the Riksdag
- In office 29 September 2014 – 24 September 2018
- Constituency: Skåne County West

Personal details
- Born: Joe Rickard Persson; 1959 (age 66–67)
- Party: Green Party

Joe Rickard Persson (born 1959) is a Swedish politician and former member of the Riksdag, the national legislature. A member of the Green Party, he represented Skåne County West between September 2014 and September 2018.

Persson is the son of editorial manager Folke Persson and shop assistant Ingegerd Persson (née Olsson). He was educated in Ystad. He studied personnel administration at Lund University and project management at IHM Business School. He was a shipping manager (1980-1984); political ombudsman (1988-1995); business advisor (1995-2002); and an administrator at the Swedish Social Insurance Agency (2002-2014). He was a member of the municipal council in Helsingborg Municipality between 1985 and 2014.
