= Tasso Stafilidis =

Swedish politician (born 1971)

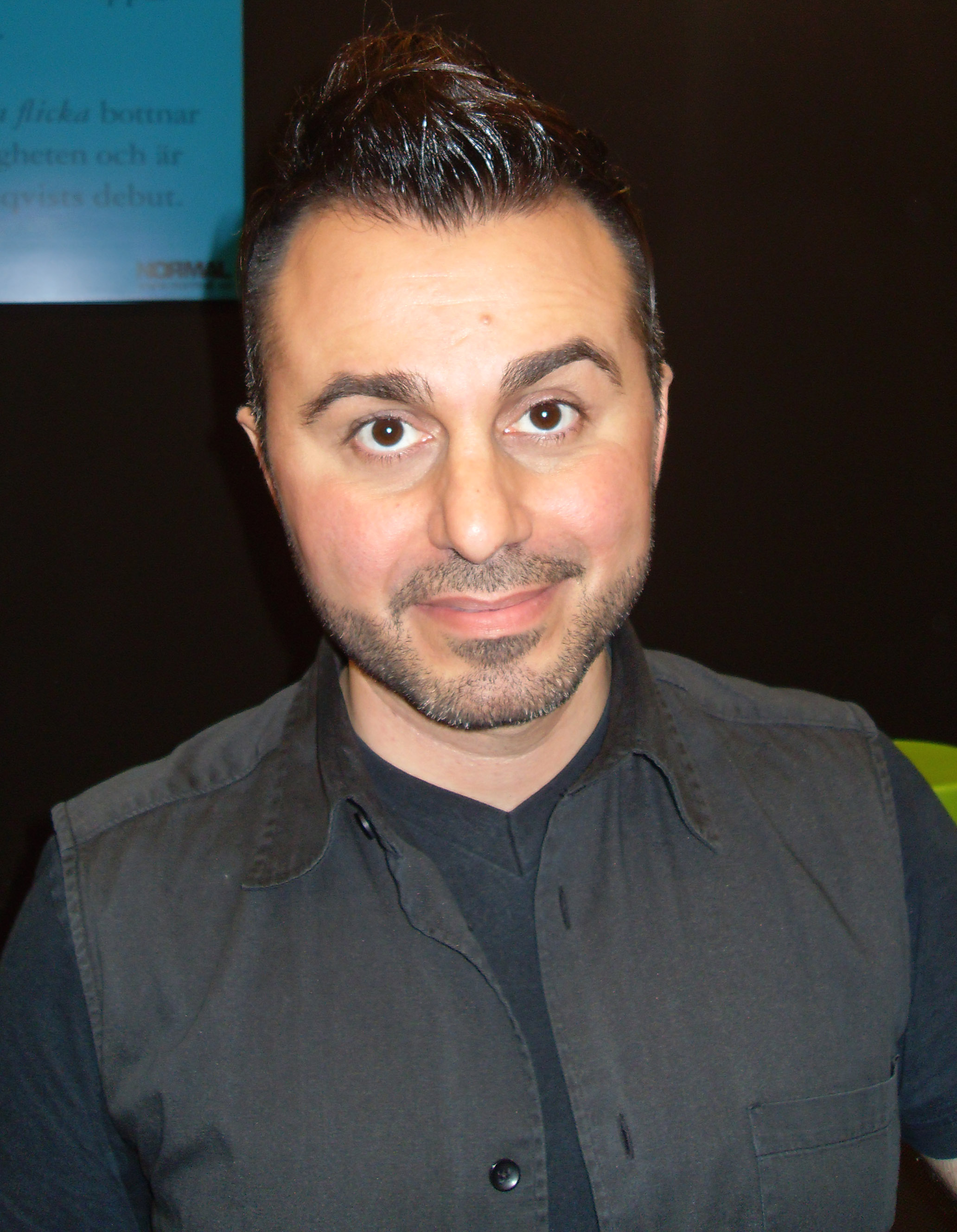
Tasso Stafilidis

Tasso Stafilidis, born 1971, is a Swedish Left Party politician, member of the Riksdag 1998–2006, and an author.

In 1998, Stafilidis became the first openly gay person to be elected to the Swedish Parliament.
