= Tina Acketoft =

Swedish politician (born 1966)

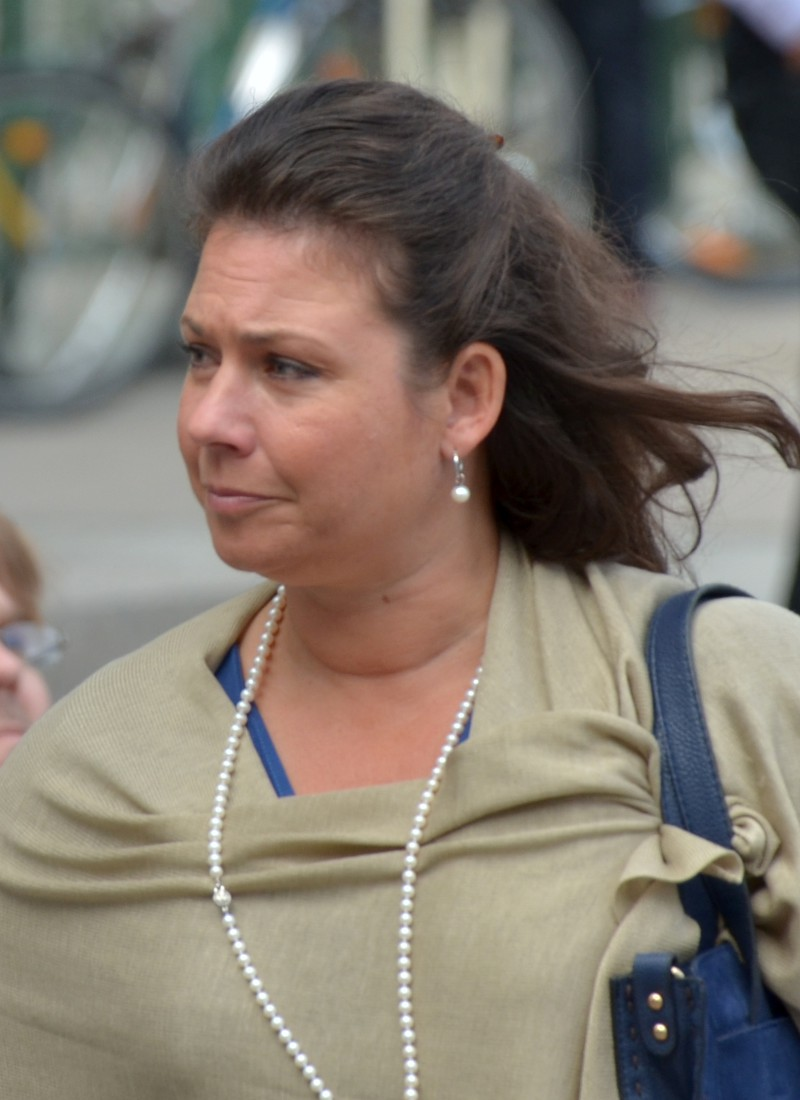
Tina Acketoft.

Tina Acketoft (born 19 March 1966 in Kokkola, Finland) is a Swedish Liberal People's Party politician. She has been a member of the Riksdag since 11 January 2007, when she replaced Torkild Strandberg. Acketoft was previously a member from 2002 to 2006.
