= Yasmine Bladelius =

Swedish politician (born 1988)

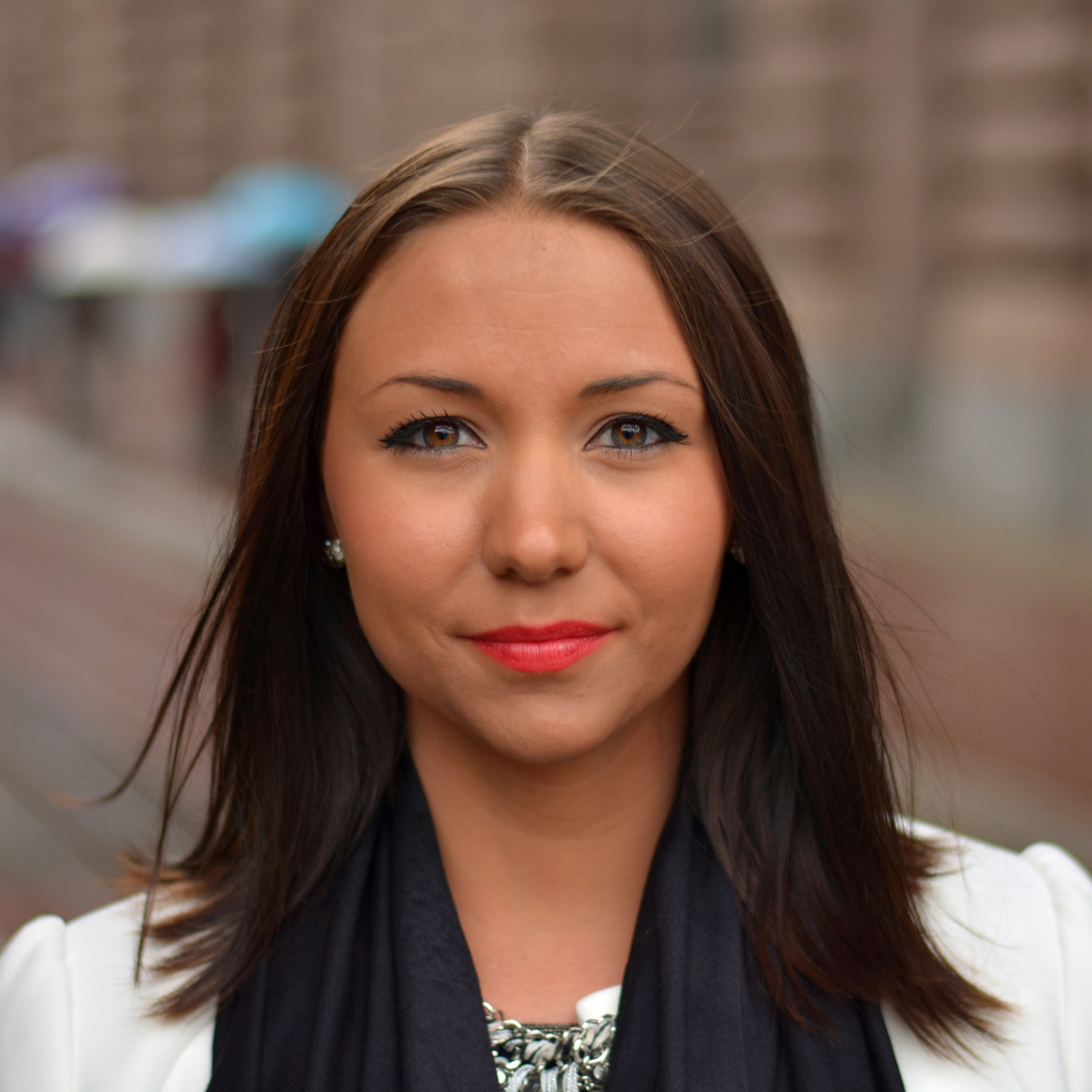
- Born: 1988 (age 37–38)
- Occupation: Politician
- Known for: Member of the Riksdag
- Political party: Social Democratic Party

Yasmine Bladelius (born 1988), previously Yasmine Larsson, is a Swedish Social Democratic Party politician.

== Political career ==
Bladelius was first elected as a member of the Riksdag for the period 2014–2018, from the Skåne Western constituency.

As of 2016, Bladelius served as chairperson of the Swedish Republican Association.

Bladelius was elected as a Member of the Riksdag again in September 2022.

In addition to her committee assignments, Bladelius has been a member of the Swedish delegation to the Parliamentary Assembly of the Council of Europe (PACE) since 2022.
