= Torkild Strandberg =

Swedish politician (born 1970)

Torkild Strandberg L
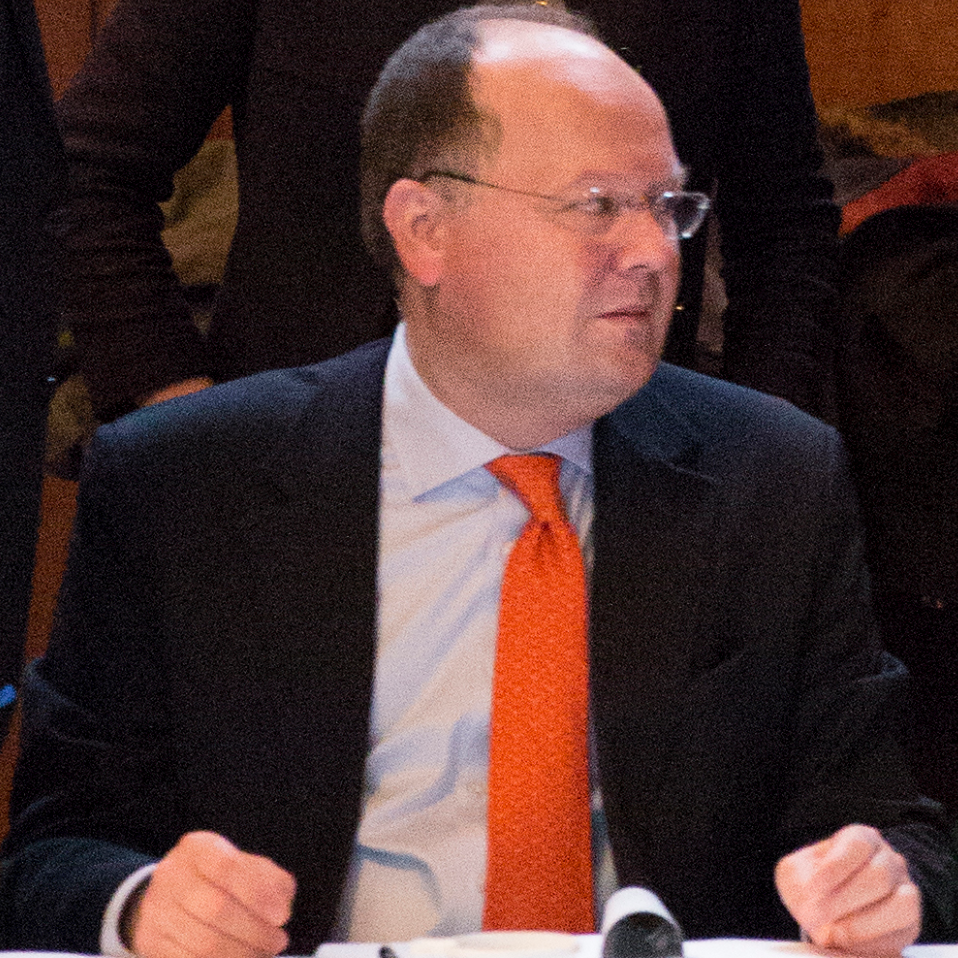
- Torkild Strandberg in late 2015

Member of the Swedish Parliament for Skåne Western
- In office 30 September 2002 – 25 September 2018

Personal details
- Born: 29 June 1970 (age 55)
- Party: Liberals
- Occupation: Politician, bank clerk

Torkild Sören Strandberg (born 29 June 1970), is a Swedish politician representing the Liberal Party. He is chairman of the municipal council in the city of Landskrona since 2007, and a former member of the Swedish Parliament (from September 2002 until September 2018).
