= Cristina Husmark Pehrsson =

Swedish politician (born 1947)

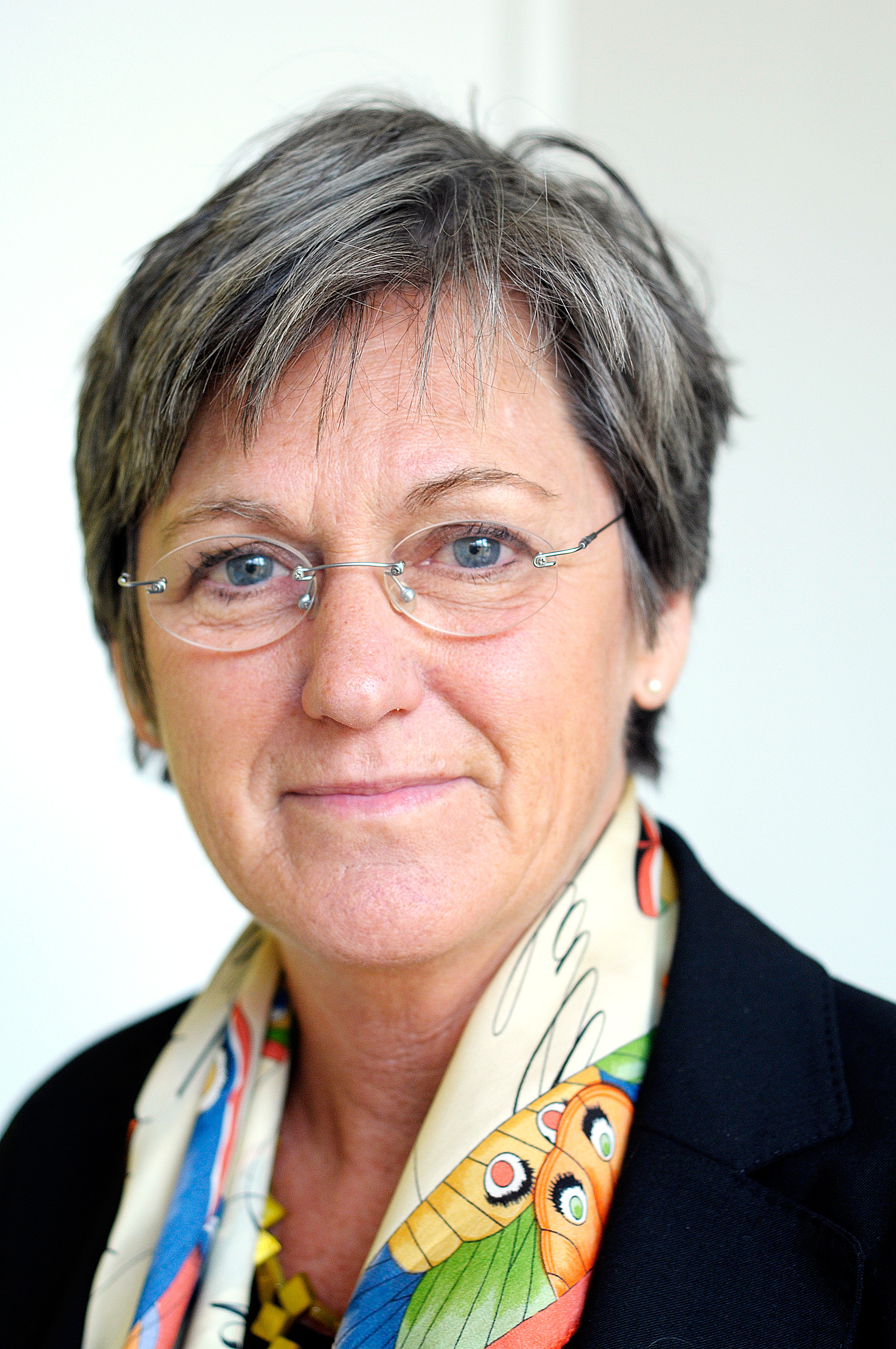

Minister for Social Security
- In office 6 October 2006 – 5 October 2010
- Prime Minister: Fredrik Reinfeldt
- Preceded by: Ylva Johansson
- Succeeded by: Ulf Kristersson

Minister for Nordic Cooperation
- In office 6 October 2006 – 5 October 2010
- Prime Minister: Fredrik Reinfeldt
- Preceded by: Berit Andnor
- Succeeded by: Ewa Björling

Member of the Swedish Riksdag for Skåne County West
- In office 5 October 1998 – 29 September 2014

Personal details
- Born: 15 April 1947 (age 79) Uddevalla, Sweden
- Party: Moderate Party
- Spouse: Folke Pehrsson
- Children: 3
- Profession: Nurse

Cristina Maria Husmark Pehrsson (born 15 April 1947) is a Swedish politician and a member of the Moderate Party. She served as Minister for Social Security and as Minister for Nordic Cooperation from 2006 to 2010. She is a certified nurse and was a member of the Swedish Riksdag for Skåne County West from 1998 to 2014.

== Government minister ==
Husmark Pehrsson was appointed Minister for Social Security following the 2006 general election. She was also appointed Minister for Nordic Cooperation.

She was the oldest person in the cabinet of Fredrik Reinfeldt from 2006 to 2010. Husmark Pehrsson was indirectly blamed for what had not worked during the introduction of the new health insurance rules in 2008; after the 2010 general election she resigned from the cabinet position on 5 October 2010.

By a memorandum, made at the Ministry of Health and Social Affairs in December 2009 and published in 2011, showed that the government's official line that the law had "unintended consequences" was a later construction. Cristina Husmark Pehrsson and her ministry had not received any hearings for their warnings that some changes would have anomalous consequences. The memo revealed that among the most controversial of the proposal, the far parentheses (sometimes called "scaffold"), was not included in the original proposal but instead was a proposal by the Ministry of Finance in order to save money. Her ministry's proposal had not meant that people should become "zero rated".

== Personal life ==
Husmark Pehrsson is married to Folke Pehrsson with whom she has three children. She lives in Landskrona, Skåne County.

Preceded by Ylva Johansson	Minister for Social Security; 2006–2010	Succeeded by Ulf Kristersson
Preceded by Berit Andnor	Minister for Nordic Cooperation; 2006–2010	Succeeded by Ewa Björling
