= Kent Härstedt =

Swedish politician

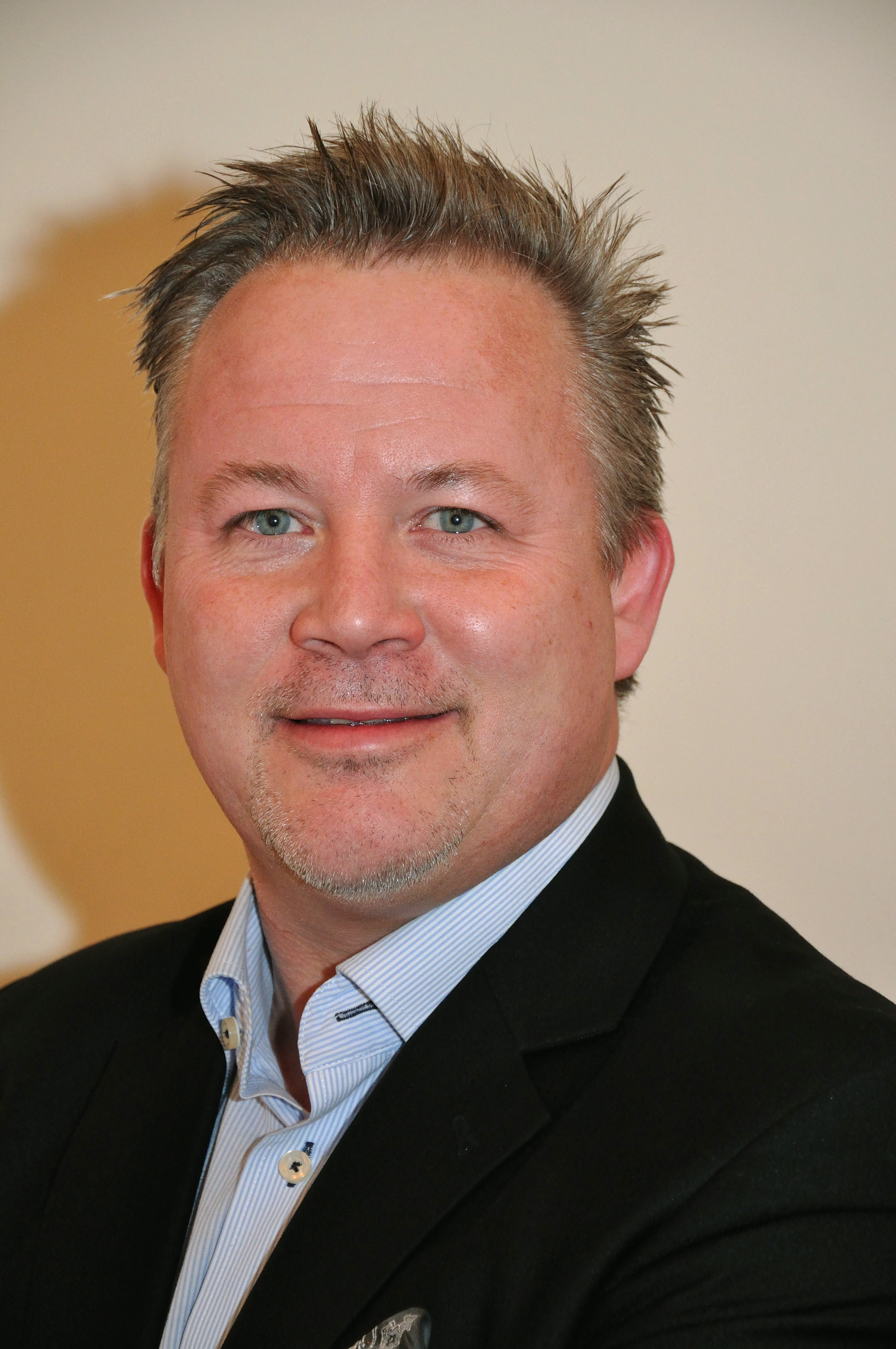
- Kent Härstedt in January 2011.

Member of the Riksdag
- In office 1998–2018
- Constituency: Skåne County west

Personal details
- Born: 29 January 1965 (age 61) Helsingborg, Sweden
- Party: Swedish Social Democratic Party
- Children: son Joel
- Occupation: writer, journalist
- Website: Kent Härstedt

Kent Härstedt (born 29 January 1965, in Helsingborg) is a Swedish Social Democratic Party politician, member of the Riksdag from 1998 to 2018.

Actively interested in politics since the age of 16, he was elected to the municipal council of Helsingborg, where he remained for six years. He worked as political adviser to vice foreign minister Pierre Schori between 1994 and 1996, and as a freelance writer for amongst others Svenska Dagbladet, Helsingborgs Dagblad, and Arbetarbladet. In 1998 he was elected to the Riksdag and remained until 2018. In 2004 and 2005, he was also alcohol commissioner for the Swedish government. Härstedt is the elected vice President of the OSCE Parliamentary Assembly 2014–2017.

At the election to Ukraine's parliament on 26 October 2014, Härstedt was the special coordinator for the OSCE observer mission. Härstedt was the OSCE special coordinator in the presidential elections in Belarus 2015 and in the parliamentary elections on 26 October 2016. He is since 2015 the chaIr of the OSCE PAs ad hoc working group on Belarus. Since 2017 Härstedt is chairman of Forum Syd, the largest Swedish NGO in support of civil society.

Between 1999 and 2005, he was the chairman of the Swedish branch of UNICEF.

Between 2009 and 2011 Härstedt was the president of the Swedish Judo Federation. Härstedt holds a black belt in Judo.

Between January 2022 and January 2023, Härstedt was Sweden's ambassador to Singapore.

Härstedt is a survivor of the MS Estonia disaster in September 1994.

Diplomatic posts
Preceded by Niclas Kvarnström	Ambassador of Sweden to Singapore; 2022–2023	Succeeded by Anders Sjöberg
Preceded by Niclas Kvarnström	Ambassador of Sweden to Brunei; 2022–2023	Succeeded by Anders Sjöberg
