= Anders Karlsson (politician) =

Swedish politician (born 1951)

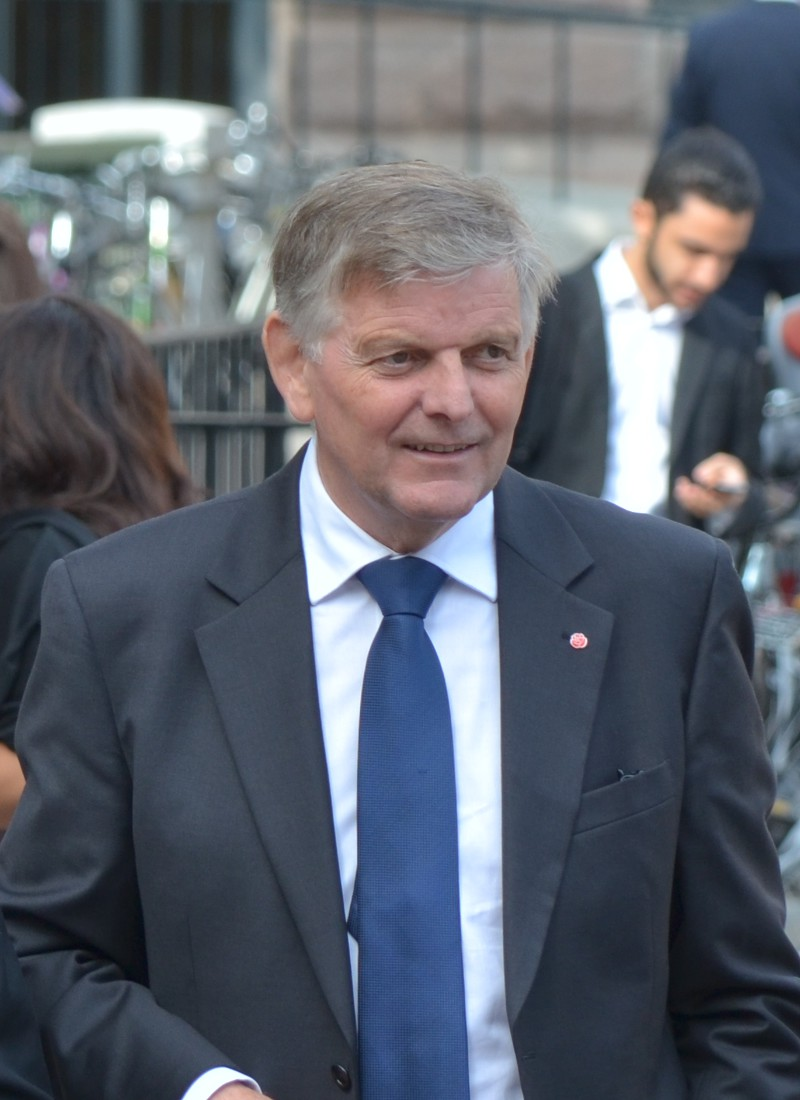
Anders Karlsson.

Anders Karlsson (born 1951) is a Swedish social democratic politician who was a member of the Riksdag from 1998 to 2014.
