= Skåne County Southern =

Swedish national legislative constituency

- Skåne Läns Södra
- Constituency for the Riksdag
- Location of Skåne County Southern within Sweden
- Municipality: List: Burlöv; Kävlinge; Lomma; Lund; Sjöbo; Skurup; Staffanstorp; Svedala; Trelleborg; Vellinge; Ystad
- County: Skåne
- Population: 415,267 (2025)
- Electorate: 313,228 (2026)
- Area: 2,558 km^{2} (2026)

Current constituency
- Created: 1994
- Seats: List (Note: Constituency seats only.): 12 (2010–present); 11 (1994–2010)
- Member of the Riksdag: List: Boriana Åberg (M); Cilla Dahl Andersson (S); Cecilia Engström (KD); Hanna Gunnarsson (V); Morgan Johansson (S); Stina Larsson (C); Hanna Lindqvist (MP); Adrian Magnusson (S); Camilla Mårtensen (L); Louise Meijer (M); Jessica Stegrud (SD); Amanda Thonander (M); Victoria Tiblom (SD)
- Created from: List: Fyrstadskretsen; Malmöhus County

Skåne County Southern (Swedish: Skåne Läns Södra) is one of the 29 multi-member constituencies of the Riksdag, the national legislature of Sweden. The constituency was established as Malmöhus County South (Swedish: Malmöhus Läns Södra) in 1994 from parts of Fyrstadskretsen and Malmöhus County following the reorganisation of the constituencies in Malmöhus County. It was renamed Skåne County Southern in 1998 when the counties of Kristianstad and Malmöhus were merged to create Skåne. The constituency currently consists of the municipalities of Burlöv, Kävlinge, Lomma, Lund, Sjöbo, Skurup, Staffanstorp, Svedala, Trelleborg, Vellinge and Ystad. The constituency currently elects 12 of the 349 members of the Riksdag using the open party-list proportional representation electoral system. At the 2026 general election it had 313,228 registered electors.

== Electoral system ==
Skåne County Southern currently elects 12 of the 349 members of the Riksdag using the open party-list proportional representation electoral system. Constituency seats are allocated using the modified Sainte-Laguë method. Only parties that reach the 4% national threshold and parties that receive at least 12% of the vote in the constituency compete for constituency seats. Supplementary levelling seats may also be allocated at the constituency level to parties that reach the 4% national threshold.

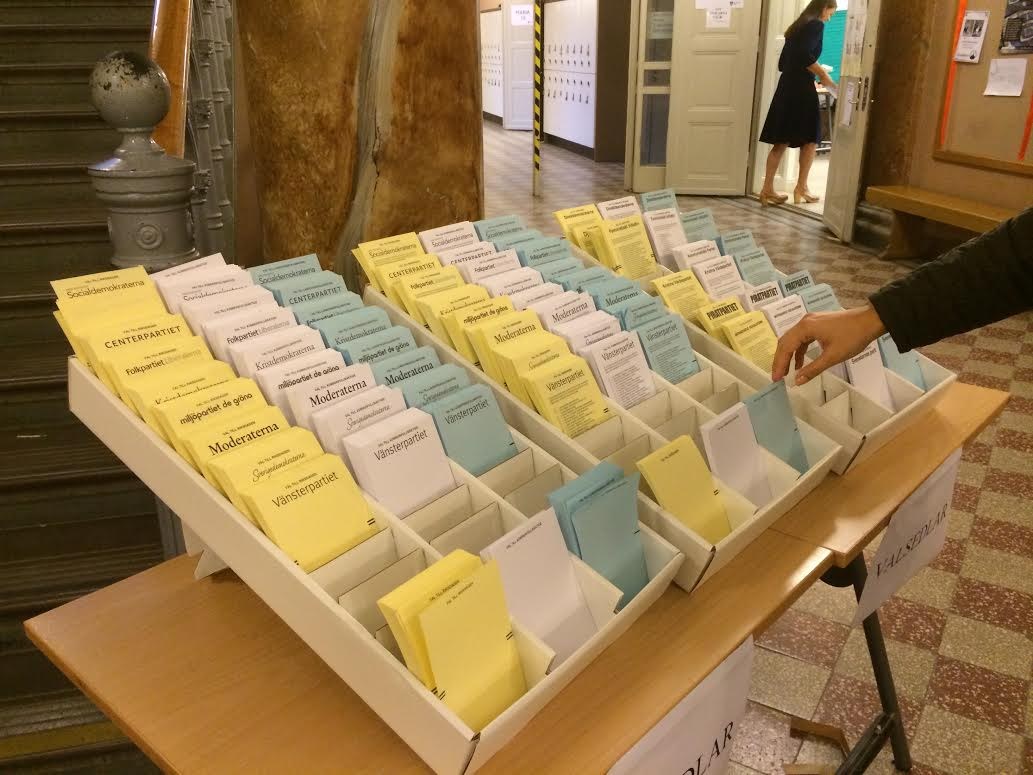
A selection of ballot papers available for voters at the 2014 general election in Stockholm - yellow for the Riksdag, blue for the regional council and white for the municipal council

Prior to 1997 voters could cast any ballot paper they wanted, though it had to contain the name of a party and the name of at least one candidate nominated by that party in the constituency. It was common for parties to hand out ballot papers with their name and list of candidates at the entrance of polling stations. Voters could delete the names of candidates or write-in the names of other candidates but in practice these options weren't used enough by voters to have any significant impact on the results and consequently elections operated as a closed system.

Since 1997, elections in Sweden follow the French model in having separate ballot papers for each party/list in a constituency. There are two ballot papers for each party - a party ballot paper (partivalsedel) with just the name of the party and a name ballot paper (namnvalsedel) with the name of the party and its list of candidates. There are also blank ballot papers (blank valsedel). Voters can initially pick as many ballot papers as they wish and then, in the secrecy of the voting booth, they select a single ballot paper of their choice. If they chose a name ballot paper they have the option of casting a preferential vote for one of their chosen party's candidates. If they chose a blank ballot paper they can write the name of any party including unregistered parties and, optionally, they can write the name of any person as their preferred candidate, even one that does not belong to their chosen party. They then place their chosen ballot paper in an envelope which is placed in the ballot box, discarding all other ballot papers they picked.

Seats won by each party/list in a constituency are allocated to its candidates in order of preference votes (a personal mandate), provided that the candidate has received at least 8% of votes cast for their party in the constituency (5% since January 2011). Any unfilled seats are then allocated to the party's remaining candidates in the order they appear on the party list (a party mandate).

== Election results ==
=== Summary ===
Election	Left V			Social Democrats S			Greens MP			Centre C			Liberals L / FP			Moderates M			Christian Democrats KD			Sweden Democrats SD		
Election	Votes	%	Seats	Votes	%	Seats	Votes	%	Seats	Votes	%	Seats	Votes	%	Seats	Votes	%	Seats	Votes	%	Seats	Votes	%	Seats
2026	16,340	6.03%	1	61,755	22.77%	3	19,638	7.24%	1	21,600	7.97%	1	17,665	6.51%	1	63,035	23.25%	3	14,469	5.34%	0	53,632	19.78%	2
2022	12,857	4.96%	0	65,747	25.35%	3	14,386	5.55%	1	17,171	6.62%	1	15,949	6.15%	1	57,216	22.06%	3	12,341	4.76%	0	60,573	23.36%	3
2018	13,426	5.31%	1	55,185	21.83%	2	12,435	4.92%	0	19,994	7.91%	1	17,768	7.03%	1	60,619	23.98%	3	13,527	5.35%	1	55,903	22.11%	3
2014	8,578	3.58%	0	59,020	24.61%	3	17,391	7.25%	1	12,795	5.33%	1	16,819	7.01%	1	67,671	28.21%	4	8,379	3.49%	0	39,734	16.57%	2
2010	7,597	3.32%	0	50,557	22.12%	3	16,176	7.08%	1	12,717	5.56%	1	19,622	8.59%	1	87,893	38.46%	5	9,916	4.34%	0	19,923	8.72%	1
2006	7,297	3.45%	0	63,975	30.27%	4	10,081	4.77%	0	12,751	6.03%	1	19,422	9.19%	1	69,959	33.10%	5	10,125	4.79%	0	11,272	5.33%	0
2002	10,876	5.49%	0	75,459	38.07%	5	8,078	4.08%	0	8,270	4.17%	0	31,270	15.77%	2	39,652	20.00%	3	13,234	6.68%	1	7,268	3.67%	0
1998	13,494	7.00%	1	68,375	35.48%	5	7,412	3.85%	0	7,634	3.96%	0	10,563	5.48%	0	59,613	30.93%	4	18,075	9.38%	1			
1994	6,801	3.39%	0	85,415	42.54%	5	8,718	4.34%	0	11,975	5.96%	1	15,480	7.71%	1	59,779	29.77%	4	5,352	2.67%	0			

(Excludes levelling seats. Figures in italics represent alliances/joint lists.)

=== Detailed ===
Party has received at least 4% of the vote nationally and is entitled to compete for constituency seats.

==== 2020s ====
===== 2026 =====
Results of the 2026 general election held on 13 September 2026:

Party		Votes per municipality											Total votes	%	Seats		
Party		Burlöv	Käv- linge	Lomma	Lund	Sjöbo	Skurup	Staffans- torp	Svedala	Trelle- borg	Vel- linge	Ystad	Total votes	%	Con.	Lev.	Tot.
Moderate Party	M	1,732	5,743	4,903	15,262	2,554	2,538	4,988	3,719	6,425	9,739	5,432	63,035	23.25%	3	0	3
Swedish Social Democratic Party	S	3,620	4,734	3,246	22,495	2,045	2,275	4,124	3,225	7,475	3,078	5,438	61,755	22.77%	3	0	3
Sweden Democrats	SD	2,114	4,930	2,511	8,843	4,664	3,341	3,528	4,283	8,719	5,607	5,092	53,632	19.78%	2	0	2
Centre Party	C	503	1,606	2,020	9,524	643	525	1,189	803	1,417	2,094	1,276	21,600	7.97%	1	0	1
Green Party	MP	488	1,031	962	12,238	453	363	798	565	943	821	976	19,638	7.24%	1	0	1
Liberals	L	430	1,336	1,831	5,914	549	497	1,007	774	1,447	2,575	1,305	17,665	6.51%	1	0	1
Left Party	V	1,382	751	366	8,705	429	539	769	571	1,471	382	975	16,340	6.03%	1	0	1
Christian Democrats	KD	368	1,218	1,052	3,439	914	602	890	858	1,769	1,956	1,403	14,469	5.34%	0	1	1
Alternative for Sweden	AfS	55	78	56	291	83	58	61	61	108	88	107	1,046	0.39%	0	0	0
Örebro Party	ÖP	15	90	44	176	64	53	51	51	87	61	57	749	0.28%	0	0	0
Pirate Party	PP	9	20	7	165	9	6	24	9	27	17	7	300	0.11%	0	0	0
Ambition Sweden	AS	11	14	9	47	10	17	9	15	16	18	29	195	0.07%	0	0	0
Citizens' Coalition	MED	3	13	7	61	4	7	12	13	24	17	9	170	0.06%	0	0	0
Human Rights and Democracy	MoD	3	2	9	42	8	10	11	12	28	17	8	150	0.06%	0	0	0
Christian Values Party	KrVP	1	7	2	61	6	5	5	3	8	8	14	120	0.04%	0	0	0
Communist Party of Sweden	SKP	10	3	2	45	3	0	5	3	11	3	7	92	0.03%	0	0	0
Direct Democrats	DD	3	2	1	18	0	1	0	2	3	1	0	31	0.01%	0	0	0
United Voice	ER	1	0	0	22	1	0	0	0	2	2	1	29	0.01%	0	0	0
Nuance Party	PNy	4	0	0	11	0	0	0	2	5	1	0	23	0.01%	0	0	0
RegleraAI.nu		0	0	0	19	0	0	0	0	1	0	0	20	0.01%	0	0	0
Volt Sweden	Volt	1	3	2	10	0	0	1	1	1	0	0	19	0.01%	0	0	0
Classical Liberal Party	KLP	0	0	2	5	0	0	0	0	6	0	0	13	0.00%	0	0	0
Sweden's National Democratic Party	SNDP	5	0	0	0	0	3	0	0	3	0	2	13	0.00%	0	0	0
Anti-Authoritarian Action Party		0	0	0	7	0	0	0	0	0	1	0	8	0.00%	0	0	0
Donald Duck Party		0	1	0	4	1	0	0	0	2	0	0	8	0.00%	0	0	0
Nordic Resistance Movement	NMR	0	0	0	4	0	0	1	0	1	0	2	8	0.00%	0	0	0
Communist Party	K	0	0	0	7	0	0	0	0	0	0	0	7	0.00%	0	0	0
Turning Point Party	PV	0	0	0	3	0	1	0	2	0	0	0	6	0.00%	0	0	0
The Push Buttons	Kn	1	0	0	0	0	0	0	0	1	2	1	5	0.00%	0	0	0
Unity	ENH	0	0	0	2	0	0	0	2	1	0	0	5	0.00%	0	0	0
Independent Rural Party	LPo	0	0	0	2	0	0	0	0	1	0	0	3	0.00%	0	0	0
A Good Sweden		1	0	0	0	0	0	0	0	1	0	0	2	0.00%	0	0	0
Tidö		0	0	2	0	0	0	0	0	0	0	0	2	0.00%	0	0	0
A Modern Country		0	0	0	1	0	0	0	0	0	0	0	1	0.00%	0	0	0
Animal Lovers' Party		0	0	0	0	0	0	0	1	0	0	0	1	0.00%	0	0	0
Evolt Folkhansa		0	0	0	0	0	0	0	0	1	0	0	1	0.00%	0	0	0
For the Good of All		0	0	0	0	0	1	0	0	0	0	0	1	0.00%	0	0	0
John Party with Extra Moose		0	0	0	1	0	0	0	0	0	0	0	1	0.00%	0	0	0
Multidimensional Party		0	0	0	0	0	0	0	0	0	1	0	1	0.00%	0	0	0
Responsible Intelligence in Politics		1	0	0	0	0	0	0	0	0	0	0	1	0.00%	0	0	0
Security Party	TRP	1	0	0	0	0	0	0	0	0	0	0	1	0.00%	0	0	0
Squirrel Party		0	0	0	1	0	0	0	0	0	0	0	1	0.00%	0	0	0
United Sweden		0	0	0	0	1	0	0	0	0	0	0	1	0.00%	0	0	0
Valid votes		10,762	21,582	17,034	87,425	12,441	10,842	17,473	14,975	30,004	26,489	22,141	271,168	100.00%	12	1	13
Blank votes		78	176	80	641	154	80	141	167	302	134	278	2,231	0.82%			
Rejected votes – unregistered parties		5	2	1	15	1	2	1	4	8	1	4	44	0.02%			
Rejected votes – other		16	8	24	95	15	10	7	14	27	17	39	272	0.10%			
Total polled		10,861	21,768	17,139	88,176	12,611	10,934	17,622	15,160	30,341	26,641	22,462	273,715	87.39%			
Registered electors		14,158	24,356	18,647	99,997	14,972	12,860	19,907	17,050	35,937	29,247	26,097	313,228				
Turnout		76.71%	89.37%	91.91%	88.18%	84.23%	85.02%	88.52%	88.91%	84.43%	91.09%	86.07%	87.39%				

The following candidates were elected:

- Constituency seats (personal mandates) - Hanna Gunnarsson (V), 1,596 votes; and Hanna Lindqvist (MP), 1,663 votes.
- Constituency seats (party mandates) - Boriana Åberg (M), 1,614 votes; Cilla Dahl Andersson (S), 990 votes; Morgan Johansson (S), 2,841 votes; Stina Larsson (C), 736 votes; Adrian Magnusson (S), 914 votes; Camilla Mårtensen (L), 375 votes; Louise Meijer (M), 1,657 votes; Jessica Stegrud (SD), 568 votes; Amanda Thonander (M), 553 votes; and Victoria Tiblom (SD), 85 votes.
- Levelling seats (party mandates) - Cecilia Engström (KD), 26 votes.

===== 2022 =====
Results of the 2022 general election held on 11 September 2022:

Party		Votes per municipality											Total votes	%	Seats		
Party		Burlöv	Käv- linge	Lomma	Lund	Sjöbo	Skurup	Staffans- torp	Svedala	Trelle- borg	Vel- linge	Ystad	Total votes	%	Con.	Lev.	Tot.
Swedish Social Democratic Party	S	3,247	5,288	3,826	23,034	2,405	2,517	4,347	3,634	7,725	3,870	5,854	65,747	25.35%	3	0	3
Sweden Democrats	SD	2,409	5,640	2,906	10,402	5,370	3,652	3,845	4,799	9,180	6,591	5,779	60,573	23.36%	3	0	3
Moderate Party	M	1,752	5,156	4,853	13,668	2,227	2,108	4,450	3,228	5,739	9,327	4,708	57,216	22.06%	3	0	3
Centre Party	C	487	1,449	1,401	7,075	543	538	1,025	712	1,287	1,597	1,057	17,171	6.62%	1	0	1
Liberals	L	362	1,098	1,470	6,857	369	342	892	508	1,091	1,980	980	15,949	6.15%	1	0	1
Green Party	MP	374	712	751	8,949	346	247	581	412	675	570	769	14,386	5.55%	1	0	1
Left Party	V	713	535	363	7,412	340	395	525	447	1,030	325	772	12,857	4.96%	0	1	1
Christian Democrats	KD	332	975	799	2,739	871	527	748	794	1,623	1,655	1,278	12,341	4.76%	0	1	1
Alternative for Sweden	AfS	34	49	35	182	56	34	37	34	82	58	66	667	0.26%	0	0	0
Nuance Party	PNy	167	11	7	183	10	15	30	22	124	8	17	594	0.23%	0	0	0
Citizens' Coalition	MED	14	44	31	212	19	24	22	27	43	48	49	533	0.21%	0	0	0
Pirate Party	PP	14	24	25	208	5	15	13	15	30	16	32	397	0.15%	0	0	0
Human Rights and Democracy	MoD	14	7	0	64	5	9	14	8	13	15	19	168	0.06%	0	0	0
The Push Buttons	Kn	2	7	5	32	24	17	8	8	17	8	15	143	0.06%	0	0	0
Climate Alliance	KA	1	4	6	72	1	5	4	1	7	0	4	105	0.04%	0	0	0
Feminist Initiative	FI	2	3	2	69	4	1	3	0	11	1	5	101	0.04%	0	0	0
Christian Values Party	KrVP	2	4	2	44	4	4	4	2	18	4	10	98	0.04%	0	0	0
Communist Party of Sweden	SKP	13	3	2	22	0	0	1	1	5	3	4	54	0.02%	0	0	0
Direct Democrats	DD	2	2	3	19	1	3	2	7	3	3	5	50	0.02%	0	0	0
Classical Liberal Party	KLP	0	1	1	10	2	2	1	3	5	7	0	32	0.01%	0	0	0
Independent Rural Party	LPo	0	5	0	1	8	0	2	3	0	1	0	20	0.01%	0	0	0
Nordic Resistance Movement	NMR	0	1	2	7	0	2	0	2	4	2	0	20	0.01%	0	0	0
Socialist Welfare Party	S-V	0	0	0	19	0	0	0	0	1	0	0	20	0.01%	0	0	0
Scania Party	SKÅ	4	1	0	3	1	0	3	2	2	1	0	17	0.01%	0	0	0
Unity	ENH	1	1	2	12	0	0	0	0	0	1	0	17	0.01%	0	0	0
Sweden Out of the EU/ Free Justice Party	FRP	0	3	0	0	0	5	1	0	6	0	0	15	0.01%	0	0	0
Basic Income Party	BASIP	1	1	0	3	1	0	0	0	2	2	2	12	0.00%	0	0	0
Turning Point Party	PV	0	1	0	5	0	1	1	0	0	0	2	10	0.00%	0	0	0
Volt Sweden	Volt	0	0	0	5	0	0	0	0	0	0	0	5	0.00%	0	0	0
Hard Line Sweden		0	0	0	1	0	0	0	1	1	0	0	3	0.00%	0	0	0
Evil Chicken Party	OKP	0	0	0	1	0	1	0	0	0	0	0	2	0.00%	0	0	0
My Sweden		0	2	0	0	0	0	0	0	0	0	0	2	0.00%	0	0	0
Security Party	TRP	0	0	0	0	0	0	0	0	2	0	0	2	0.00%	0	0	0
Corn Party		0	0	0	1	0	0	0	0	0	0	0	1	0.00%	0	0	0
European Workers Party	EAP	0	0	1	0	0	0	0	0	0	0	0	1	0.00%	0	0	0
Freedom of the Family		0	1	0	0	0	0	0	0	0	0	0	1	0.00%	0	0	0
Sweden Party		0	0	0	1	0	0	0	0	0	0	0	1	0.00%	0	0	0
Swexit Party		0	1	0	0	0	0	0	0	0	0	0	1	0.00%	0	0	0
Yggdrasil		0	0	0	1	0	0	0	0	0	0	0	1	0.00%	0	0	0
Valid votes		9,947	21,029	16,493	81,313	12,612	10,464	16,559	14,670	28,726	26,093	21,427	259,333	100.00%	12	2	14
Blank votes		85	180	75	614	156	129	124	162	273	142	274	2,214	0.85%			
Rejected votes – unregistered parties		3	6	2	12	6	1	4	0	23	3	0	60	0.02%			
Rejected votes – other		9	10	8	67	7	2	8	6	28	16	13	174	0.07%			
Total polled		10,044	21,225	16,578	82,006	12,781	10,596	16,695	14,838	29,050	26,254	21,714	261,781	87.32%			
Registered electors		13,481	23,627	17,944	93,503	14,943	12,295	18,852	16,609	34,670	28,670	25,215	299,809				
Turnout		74.50%	89.83%	92.39%	87.70%	85.53%	86.18%	88.56%	89.34%	83.79%	91.57%	86.12%	87.32%				

The following candidates were elected:

- Constituency seats (personal mandates) - Mats Persson (L), 845 votes.
- Constituency seats (party mandates) - Boriana Åberg (M), 1,241 votes; Lars Andersson (SD), 22 votes; Emma Berginger (MP), 3 votes; Marianne Fundahn (S), 1,133 votes; Morgan Johansson (S), 2,682 votes; Stina Larsson (C), 5 votes; Adrian Magnusson (S), 898 votes; Louise Meijer (M), 1,582 votes; Christian Sonesson (M), 1,891 votes; Jessica Stegrud (SD), 573 votes; and Victoria Tiblom (SD), 131 votes.
- Levelling seats (personal mandates) - Hanna Gunnarsson (V), 742 votes.
- Levelling seats (party mandates) - Cecilia Engström (KD), 31 votes.

Permanent substitutions:

- Christian Sonesson (M) resigned on 11 October 2022 and was replaced by Emma Ahlström Köster (M) on 12 October 2022.

==== 2010s ====
===== 2018 =====
Results of the 2018 general election held on 9 September 2018:

Party		Votes per municipality											Total votes	%	Seats		
Party		Burlöv	Käv- linge	Lomma	Lund	Sjöbo	Skurup	Staffans- torp	Svedala	Trelle- borg	Vel- linge	Ystad	Total votes	%	Con.	Lev.	Tot.
Moderate Party	M	1,937	5,234	5,438	15,223	2,263	2,072	4,375	3,105	6,116	9,988	4,868	60,619	23.98%	3	0	3
Sweden Democrats	SD	2,392	5,106	2,807	9,739	4,871	3,352	3,604	4,322	8,738	5,946	5,026	55,903	22.11%	3	0	3
Swedish Social Democratic Party	S	3,244	4,616	2,738	18,447	2,371	2,268	3,469	3,004	7,075	2,672	5,281	55,185	21.83%	2	1	3
Centre Party	C	504	1,561	1,531	7,726	876	728	1,192	821	1,623	1,829	1,603	19,994	7.91%	1	0	1
Liberals	L	473	1,300	1,635	7,765	362	384	1,009	735	1,280	1,832	993	17,768	7.03%	1	0	1
Christian Democrats	KD	355	1,056	1,046	3,778	766	440	809	724	1,475	1,881	1,197	13,527	5.35%	1	0	1
Left Party	V	624	573	417	7,746	411	429	492	440	1,105	331	858	13,426	5.31%	1	0	1
Green Party	MP	337	676	626	7,264	301	264	591	405	717	559	695	12,435	4.92%	0	1	1
Feminist Initiative	FI	46	60	40	724	65	32	53	30	81	34	85	1,250	0.49%	0	0	0
Alternative for Sweden	AfS	34	55	45	279	39	24	41	40	78	46	49	730	0.29%	0	0	0
Citizens' Coalition	MED	13	36	34	316	23	27	30	24	38	60	59	660	0.26%	0	0	0
Pirate Party	PP	14	25	7	186	14	5	15	20	27	18	21	352	0.14%	0	0	0
Animals' Party	DjuP	10	26	9	96	4	4	15	6	36	10	8	224	0.09%	0	0	0
Direct Democrats	DD	6	15	9	58	6	4	10	11	17	4	9	149	0.06%	0	0	0
Unity	ENH	3	14	6	46	9	7	10	7	7	11	14	134	0.05%	0	0	0
Classical Liberal Party	KLP	0	3	0	44	3	4	2	3	7	11	1	78	0.03%	0	0	0
Nordic Resistance Movement	NMR	0	12	5	19	3	4	0	3	19	6	5	76	0.03%	0	0	0
Independent Rural Party	LPo	4	5	2	6	12	4	3	13	3	0	4	56	0.02%	0	0	0
Christian Values Party	KrVP	1	4	0	37	5	0	3	1	3	0	1	55	0.02%	0	0	0
Security Party	TRP	3	5	0	15	7	1	1	11	4	1	0	48	0.02%	0	0	0
Communist Party of Sweden	SKP	7	0	0	29	0	0	1	0	0	1	0	38	0.02%	0	0	0
Scania Party	SKÅ	3	1	5	3	4	0	7	6	1	4	3	37	0.01%	0	0	0
Basic Income Party	BASIP	0	13	0	6	2	0	0	1	0	0	3	25	0.01%	0	0	0
Initiative	INI	0	0	0	15	0	0	0	3	1	1	2	22	0.01%	0	0	0
European Workers Party	EAP	0	0	1	0	0	0	0	0	0	0	0	1	0.00%	0	0	0
Parties not on the ballot	ÖVR	0	0	0	8	1	1	1	0	0	0	1	12	0.00%	0	0	0
Valid votes		10,010	20,396	16,401	79,575	12,418	10,054	15,733	13,735	28,451	25,245	20,786	252,804	100.00%	12	2	14
Blank votes		86	131	84	512	154	97	97	139	300	102	233	1,935	0.76%			
Rejected votes – unregistered parties		2	3	0	21	5	0	1	4	7	4	4	51	0.02%			
Rejected votes – other		7	4	7	35	5	3	2	4	20	9	13	109	0.04%			
Total polled		10,105	20,534	16,492	80,143	12,582	10,154	15,833	13,882	28,778	25,360	21,036	254,899	89.38%			
Registered electors		12,513	22,547	17,570	89,308	14,532	11,511	17,448	15,272	33,326	27,231	23,912	285,170				
Turnout		80.76%	91.07%	93.86%	89.74%	86.58%	88.21%	90.74%	90.90%	86.35%	93.13%	87.97%	89.38%				

The following candidates were elected:

- Constituency seats (personal mandates) - Hanna Gunnarsson (V), 1,062 votes; Morgan Johansson (S), 3,616 votes; and Kristina Yngwe (C), 1,336 votes.
- Constituency seats (party mandates) - Boriana Åberg (M), 1,373 votes; Jennie Åfeldt (SD), 1 vote; Lars Andersson (SD), 74 votes; Clara Aranda (SD), 0 votes; Sofia Damm (KD), 133 votes; Anders Hansson (M), 2,350 votes; Louise Meijer (M), 1,629 votes; Mats Persson (L), 869 votes; and Marianne Pettersson (S), 1,234 votes.
- Levelling seats (personal mandates) - Emma Berginger (MP), 782 votes.
- Levelling seats (party mandates) - Rikard Larsson (S), 339 votes.

===== 2014 =====
Results of the 2014 general election held on 14 September 2014:

Party		Votes per municipality											Total votes	%	Seats		
Party		Burlöv	Käv- linge	Lomma	Lund	Sjöbo	Skurup	Staffans- torp	Svedala	Trelle- borg	Vel- linge	Ystad	Total votes	%	Con.	Lev.	Tot.
Moderate Party	M	2,038	5,677	6,176	17,244	2,743	2,259	4,597	3,471	6,487	11,420	5,559	67,671	28.21%	4	0	4
Swedish Social Democratic Party	S	3,548	5,237	2,690	17,159	2,798	2,736	3,756	3,439	8,907	2,814	5,936	59,020	24.61%	3	0	3
Sweden Democrats	SD	1,863	3,657	1,954	6,987	3,544	2,396	2,553	3,113	6,472	3,871	3,324	39,734	16.57%	2	0	2
Green Party	MP	588	1,129	897	9,350	461	373	877	659	1,165	852	1,040	17,391	7.25%	1	0	1
Liberal People's Party	FP	476	1,237	1,531	7,400	337	360	927	694	1,068	1,859	930	16,819	7.01%	1	0	1
Centre Party	C	291	1,081	905	4,293	916	643	791	567	1,078	1,015	1,215	12,795	5.33%	1	0	1
Left Party	V	418	396	203	4,865	278	320	349	267	673	233	576	8,578	3.58%	0	0	0
Christian Democrats	KD	178	548	769	3,025	400	223	496	378	684	1,090	588	8,379	3.49%	0	1	1
Feminist Initiative	FI	178	225	248	4,516	232	160	251	193	393	251	402	7,049	2.94%	0	0	0
Pirate Party	PP	44	70	33	587	45	37	69	46	82	60	52	1,125	0.47%	0	0	0
Swedish Senior Citizen Interest Party	SPI	7	27	44	68	10	5	63	61	113	18	82	498	0.21%	0	0	0
Unity	ENH	2	15	3	44	15	14	8	12	12	15	9	149	0.06%	0	0	0
Party of the Swedes	SVP	8	9	2	37	35	9	8	2	17	3	15	145	0.06%	0	0	0
Animals' Party	DjuP	4	4	5	82	6	7	7	2	16	8	3	144	0.06%	0	0	0
Classical Liberal Party	KLP	1	4	1	69	0	1	2	2	4	2	7	93	0.04%	0	0	0
Christian Values Party	KrVP	6	3	1	39	5	0	5	4	1	1	1	66	0.03%	0	0	0
Direct Democrats		0	3	1	22	0	3	2	1	4	0	5	41	0.02%	0	0	0
Communist Party of Sweden	SKP	6	0	0	8	0	0	0	1	0	0	0	15	0.01%	0	0	0
Independent Rural Party	LBPo	0	0	0	9	2	0	0	0	1	0	1	13	0.01%	0	0	0
Scania Party	SKÅ	1	1	0	2	0	2	2	1	1	0	0	10	0.00%	0	0	0
European Workers Party	EAP	0	0	2	3	0	0	0	0	1	0	0	6	0.00%	0	0	0
Health Party		1	0	0	0	0	0	1	1	0	0	2	5	0.00%	0	0	0
Socialist Justice Party	RS	0	0	0	2	1	1	0	0	0	0	0	4	0.00%	0	0	0
Crossroads		0	0	0	0	0	1	0	0	1	0	0	2	0.00%	0	0	0
Sweden Out of the EU/ Free Justice Party	FRP	0	0	0	1	0	0	0	0	0	0	0	1	0.00%	0	0	0
Parties not on the ballot		3	6	8	32	2	6	2	8	11	10	4	92	0.04%	0	0	0
Valid votes		9,661	19,329	15,473	75,844	11,830	9,556	14,766	12,922	27,191	23,522	19,751	239,845	100.00%	12	1	13
Blank votes		77	197	80	651	135	120	130	142	259	132	245	2,168	0.90%			
Rejected votes – other		0	8	6	31	6	4	1	6	6	3	4	75	0.03%			
Total polled		9,738	19,534	15,559	76,526	11,971	9,680	14,897	13,070	27,456	23,657	20,000	242,088	87.87%			
Registered electors		12,077	21,780	16,756	86,390	14,210	11,300	16,612	14,695	32,473	25,895	23,327	275,515				
Turnout		80.63%	89.69%	92.86%	88.58%	84.24%	85.66%	89.68%	88.94%	84.55%	91.36%	85.74%	87.87%				

The following candidates were elected:

- Constituency seats (personal mandates) - Mats Persson (FP), 872 votes; Karin Svensson Smith (MP), 1,145 votes; and Kristina Yngwe (C), 1,519 votes.
- Constituency seats (party mandates) - Boriana Åberg (M), 986 votes; Pavel Gamov (SD), 8 votes; Anders Hansson (M), 2,635 votes; Morgan Johansson (S), 2,470 votes; Patrik Jönsson (SD), 4 votes; Rikard Larsson (S), 491 votes; Kerstin Nilsson (S), 604 votes; Gunilla Nordgren (M), 674 votes; and Ewa Thalén Finné (M), 842 votes.
- Levelling seats (party mandates) - Sofia Damm (KD), 215 votes.

Permanent substitutions:

- Patrik Jönsson (SD) resigned on 21 December 2014 and was replaced by Fredrik Eriksson (SD) on 22 December 2014.

===== 2010 =====
Results of the 2010 general election held on 19 September 2010:

Party		Votes per municipality											Total votes	%	Seats		
Party		Burlöv	Käv- linge	Lomma	Lund	Sjöbo	Skurup	Staffans- torp	Svedala	Trelle- borg	Vel- linge	Ystad	Total votes	%	Con.	Lev.	Tot.
Moderate Party	M	2,909	7,363	7,079	23,073	3,914	3,195	5,994	4,919	8,922	13,365	7,160	87,893	38.46%	5	0	5
Swedish Social Democratic Party	S	3,160	4,676	2,021	14,018	2,626	2,391	3,149	3,010	8,025	2,123	5,358	50,557	22.12%	3	0	3
Sweden Democrats	SD	1,177	1,677	834	3,586	1,772	1,227	1,220	1,657	3,604	1,575	1,594	19,923	8.72%	1	0	1
Liberal People's Party	FP	652	1,591	1,515	8,004	543	575	1,135	903	1,521	1,957	1,226	19,622	8.59%	1	0	1
Green Party	MP	496	865	698	9,178	463	385	724	572	1,030	726	1,039	16,176	7.08%	1	0	1
Centre Party	C	254	972	781	4,775	964	665	717	501	1,037	965	1,086	12,717	5.56%	1	0	1
Christian Democrats	KD	232	663	795	3,596	433	256	532	399	957	1,391	662	9,916	4.34%	0	1	1
Left Party	V	353	389	201	4,155	328	249	300	276	661	195	490	7,597	3.32%	0	0	0
Pirate Party	PP	59	102	61	772	51	38	71	61	120	52	87	1,474	0.65%	0	0	0
Swedish Senior Citizen Interest Party	SPI	28	60	196	130	64	66	203	104	256	225	118	1,450	0.63%	0	0	0
Feminist Initiative	FI	26	45	36	569	23	36	34	33	57	32	63	954	0.42%	0	0	0
Alliance Party / Citizen's Voice	ALP	52	0	0	1	0	0	0	1	0	0	0	54	0.02%	0	0	0
Classical Liberal Party	KLP	1	2	3	33	1	0	0	1	0	0	5	46	0.02%	0	0	0
National Democrats	ND	3	5	1	8	0	1	0	0	4	0	0	22	0.01%	0	0	0
Communist Party of Sweden	SKP	2	1	0	5	1	0	1	3	0	1	0	14	0.01%	0	0	0
Unity	ENH	0	1	0	6	0	2	1	0	0	0	1	11	0.00%	0	0	0
Freedom Party		1	0	0	3	0	0	0	1	4	0	0	9	0.00%	0	0	0
European Workers Party	EAP	0	0	0	7	0	0	1	0	0	0	0	8	0.00%	0	0	0
Party of the Swedes	SVP	1	1	2	2	0	0	1	0	0	0	0	7	0.00%	0	0	0
Swedish National Democratic Party	SNDP	2	1	0	1	0	0	1	1	0	1	0	7	0.00%	0	0	0
Active Democracy		0	1	0	4	0	0	0	0	0	0	1	6	0.00%	0	0	0
Scania Party	SKÅ	3	0	0	0	0	0	1	1	0	1	0	6	0.00%	0	0	0
Alexander's Lista	Alex	0	0	0	0	0	0	0	0	0	3	0	3	0.00%	0	0	0
Socialist Justice Party	RS	0	0	0	3	0	0	0	0	0	0	0	3	0.00%	0	0	0
Spirits Party		0	0	0	1	0	0	0	0	0	0	1	2	0.00%	0	0	0
Republicans		0	0	0	0	0	0	1	0	0	0	0	1	0.00%	0	0	0
Rural Democrats		0	0	0	0	0	1	0	0	0	0	0	1	0.00%	0	0	0
Parties not on the ballot		2	7	1	13	6	0	2	4	4	2	6	47	0.02%	0	0	0
Valid votes		9,413	18,422	14,224	71,943	11,189	9,087	14,088	12,447	26,202	22,614	18,897	228,526	100.00%	12	1	13
Blank votes		89	198	135	742	172	127	133	148	301	151	263	2,459	1.06%			
Rejected votes – other		3	11	9	13	4	3	7	3	21	8	9	91	0.04%			
Total polled		9,505	18,631	14,368	72,698	11,365	9,217	14,228	12,598	26,524	22,773	19,169	231,076	86.36%			
Registered electors		11,783	21,238	15,731	83,320	13,949	11,046	16,125	14,429	31,899	25,084	22,958	267,562				
Turnout		80.67%	87.72%	91.34%	87.25%	81.48%	83.44%	88.24%	87.31%	83.15%	90.79%	83.50%	86.36%				

The following candidates were elected:

- Constituency seats (party mandates) - Boriana Åberg (M), 838 votes; Bo Bernhardsson (S), 526 votes; Anders Hansson (M), 2,271 votes; Ulf Holm (MP), 573 votes; Morgan Johansson (S), 2,164 votes; Christine Jönsson (M), 1,049 votes; Julia Kronlid (SD), 14 votes; Johan Linander (C), 502 votes; Kerstin Nilsson (S), 606 votes; Ulf Nilsson (FP), 645 votes; Gunilla Nordgren (M), 602 votes; and Ewa Thalén Finné (M), 2,863 votes.
- Levelling seats (party mandates) - Otto von Arnold (KD), 432 votes.

Permanent substitutions:

- Christine Jönsson (M) resigned on 10 January 2011 and was replaced by Linda Andersson (M) on 11 January 2011.

==== 2000s ====
===== 2006 =====
Results of the 2006 general election held on 17 September 2006:

Party		Votes per municipality											Total votes	%	Seats		
Party		Burlöv	Käv- linge	Lomma	Lund	Sjöbo	Skurup	Staffans- torp	Svedala	Trelle- borg	Vel- linge	Ystad	Total votes	%	Con.	Lev.	Tot.
Moderate Party	M	2,188	5,380	5,664	19,883	3,018	2,453	4,642	3,537	5,775	11,952	5,467	69,959	33.10%	5	0	5
Swedish Social Democratic Party	S	3,742	5,973	2,841	17,189	3,284	2,978	4,132	4,245	9,638	3,599	6,354	63,975	30.27%	4	0	4
Liberal People's Party	FP	655	1,457	1,398	8,233	530	549	1,102	953	1,554	1,878	1,113	19,422	9.19%	1	0	1
Centre Party	C	285	942	665	4,780	1,070	747	671	532	1,176	781	1,102	12,751	6.03%	1	0	1
Sweden Democrats	SD	709	1,176	499	1,695	912	656	668	1,083	2,174	900	800	11,272	5.33%	0	0	0
Christian Democrats	KD	295	705	673	2,952	602	389	551	451	1,430	1,205	872	10,125	4.79%	0	1	1
Green Party	MP	277	432	371	6,093	275	248	425	316	668	408	568	10,081	4.77%	0	1	1
Left Party	V	377	377	201	3,934	304	236	287	257	630	225	469	7,297	3.45%	0	0	0
Swedish Senior Citizen Interest Party	SPI	83	154	235	199	36	86	209	74	868	281	238	2,463	1.17%	0	0	0
Feminist Initiative	FI	48	108	58	907	40	40	76	63	121	52	117	1,630	0.77%	0	0	0
Pirate Party	PP	44	118	50	598	38	49	77	79	120	26	67	1,266	0.60%	0	0	0
June List	JL	19	63	47	192	57	10	41	44	64	58	66	661	0.31%	0	0	0
Alliance Party	ALP	100	0	0	0	0	0	0	1	0	0	0	101	0.05%	0	0	0
Health Care Party	Sjvåp	1	11	3	25	3	8	5	7	0	1	11	75	0.04%	0	0	0
Unity	ENH	1	7	0	20	2	7	5	0	6	7	5	60	0.03%	0	0	0
National Democrats	ND	17	1	0	7	9	0	3	0	1	1	3	42	0.02%	0	0	0
Swedish National Democratic Party	SNDP	0	1	5	17	5	2	2	2	1	2	0	37	0.02%	0	0	0
National Socialist Front	NSF	2	2	0	4	4	0	2	0	4	3	1	22	0.01%	0	0	0
People's Will		0	0	0	7	1	2	0	3	0	0	0	13	0.01%	0	0	0
Partiet.se		10	0	0	0	0	0	0	0	0	0	0	10	0.00%	0	0	0
Communist Party of Sweden	SKP	0	0	0	4	0	0	0	3	0	1	0	8	0.00%	0	0	0
Classical Liberal Party	KLP	0	0	0	5	0	0	0	0	0	0	0	5	0.00%	0	0	0
European Workers Party	EAP	0	0	0	4	0	0	1	0	0	0	0	5	0.00%	0	0	0
New Future	NYF	0	0	0	1	0	0	0	0	4	0	0	5	0.00%	0	0	0
Unique Party		0	0	0	2	0	0	0	0	0	0	0	2	0.00%	0	0	0
Active Democracy		0	0	0	1	0	0	0	0	0	0	0	1	0.00%	0	0	0
Socialist Justice Party	RS	0	0	0	0	1	0	0	0	0	0	0	1	0.00%	0	0	0
Parties not on the ballot		0	5	2	17	8	1	1	0	7	3	1	45	0.02%	0	0	0
Valid votes		8,853	16,912	12,712	66,769	10,199	8,461	12,900	11,650	24,241	21,383	17,254	211,334	100.00%	11	2	13
Blank votes		116	270	152	1,025	231	159	220	194	398	234	327	3,326	1.55%			
Rejected votes – other		5	5	0	35	6	1	7	5	7	7	20	98	0.05%			
Total polled		8,974	17,187	12,864	67,829	10,436	8,621	13,127	11,849	24,646	21,624	17,601	214,758	84.55%			
Registered electors		11,183	19,995	14,339	79,065	13,429	10,696	15,102	13,861	30,409	24,160	21,752	253,991				
Turnout		80.25%	85.96%	89.71%	85.79%	77.71%	80.60%	86.92%	85.48%	81.05%	89.50%	80.92%	84.55%				

The following candidates were elected:

- Constituency seats (party mandates) - Anders Hansson (M), 1,180 votes; Inger Jarl Beck (S), 322 votes; Morgan Johansson (S), 1,479 votes; Christine Jönsson (M), 973 votes; Johan Linander (C), 594 votes; Lars Lindblad (M), 1,186 votes; Ulf Nilsson (FP), 724 votes; Ronny Olander (S), 1,283 votes; Anne-Marie Pålsson (M), 3,148 votes; Catherine Persson (S), 1,304 votes; and Ewa Thalén Finné (M), 1,088 votes.
- Levelling seats (party mandates) - Peter Althin (KD), 230 votes; and Ulf Holm (MP), 306 votes.

Permanent substitutions:

- Catherine Persson (S) resigned on 8 April 2007 and was replaced by Bo Bernhardsson (S) on 9 April 2007.
- Peter Althin (KD) resigned on 4 November 2007 and was replaced by Otto von Arnold (KD) on 5 November 2007.

===== 2002 =====
Results of the 2002 general election held on 15 September 2002:

Party		Votes per municipality											Total votes	%	Seats		
Party		Burlöv	Käv- linge	Lomma	Lund	Sjöbo	Skurup	Staffans- torp	Svedala	Trelle- borg	Vel- linge	Ystad	Total votes	%	Con.	Lev.	Tot.
Swedish Social Democratic Party	S	4,184	6,549	3,800	21,595	3,507	3,175	5,080	4,875	10,859	4,805	7,030	75,459	38.07%	5	0	5
Moderate Party	M	1,237	2,761	3,173	10,655	1,761	1,405	2,526	1,818	3,380	7,787	3,149	39,652	20.00%	3	0	3
Liberal People's Party	FP	1,031	2,106	2,366	12,969	866	888	1,791	1,473	2,211	3,712	1,857	31,270	15.77%	2	0	2
Christian Democrats	KD	451	970	920	3,594	889	567	859	755	1,612	1,589	1,028	13,234	6.68%	1	0	1
Left Party	V	551	628	309	5,768	456	385	399	420	931	288	741	10,876	5.49%	0	1	1
Centre Party	C	204	650	298	2,082	1,028	753	480	433	931	472	939	8,270	4.17%	0	1	1
Green Party	MP	238	402	369	4,535	266	210	291	276	638	385	468	8,078	4.08%	0	1	1
Sweden Democrats	SD	562	914	401	1,101	479	452	436	690	1,099	667	467	7,268	3.67%	0	0	0
Swedish Senior Citizen Interest Party	SPI	42	185	172	313	172	96	236	108	751	344	243	2,662	1.34%	0	0	0
Scania Party	SKÅ	113	52	65	296	32	26	75	85	119	113	29	1,005	0.51%	0	0	0
Socialist Party	SOC.P	0	0	0	69	1	0	0	0	0	0	1	71	0.04%	0	0	0
Alliance Party	ALP	52	0	1	0	0	2	0	0	0	0	0	55	0.03%	0	0	0
Unity	ENH	0	2	0	6	1	0	2	1	1	1	1	15	0.01%	0	0	0
Skåne Federalists		0	0	1	6	0	0	0	0	5	0	0	12	0.01%	0	0	0
The Communists	KOMM	1	1	1	4	0	0	0	0	1	0	1	9	0.00%	0	0	0
European Workers Party	EAP	0	0	0	4	0	0	0	0	0	0	0	4	0.00%	0	0	0
Republicans		0	0	0	0	0	0	1	1	1	0	1	4	0.00%	0	0	0
Swedish National Democratic Party	SNDP	2	0	0	0	0	0	1	0	1	0	0	4	0.00%	0	0	0
Singles Party		0	0	0	2	0	0	0	0	0	0	0	2	0.00%	0	0	0
Socialist Justice Party	RS	0	0	0	1	0	0	0	0	1	0	0	2	0.00%	0	0	0
Blank Voters Party		1	0	0	0	0	0	0	0	0	0	0	1	0.00%	0	0	0
New Future	NYF	0	0	0	0	1	0	0	0	0	0	0	1	0.00%	0	0	0
Other parties	ÖVR	13	4	7	77	102	2	14	8	24	16	7	274	0.14%	0	0	0
Valid votes		8,682	15,224	11,883	63,077	9,561	7,961	12,191	10,943	22,565	20,179	15,962	198,228	100.00%	11	3	14
Rejected votes		106	219	152	963	226	141	166	176	328	226	337	3,040	1.51%			
Total polled		8,788	15,443	12,035	64,040	9,787	8,102	12,357	11,119	22,893	20,405	16,299	201,268	82.56%			
Registered electors		11,015	18,540	13,655	76,067	12,919	10,399	14,536	13,295	29,144	23,289	20,936	243,795				
Turnout		79.78%	83.30%	88.14%	84.19%	75.76%	77.91%	85.01%	83.63%	78.55%	87.62%	77.85%	82.56%				

The following candidates were elected:

- Constituency seats (party mandates) - Peter Althin (KD), 789 votes; Bo Bernhardsson (S), 1,076 votes; Carl-Axel Johansson (M), 952 votes; Morgan Johansson (S), 1,071 votes; Anita Jönsson (S), 1,015 votes; Lars Lindblad (M), 744 votes; Ulf Nilsson (FP), 1,205 votes; Ronny Olander (S), 1,580 votes; Anne-Marie Pålsson (M), 2,493 votes; Catherine Persson (S), 1,188 votes; and Marie Wahlgren (FP), 408 votes.
- Levelling seats (personal mandates) - Karin Svensson Smith (V), 2,029 votes.
- Levelling seats (party mandates) - Ulf Holm (MP), 313 votes; and Johan Linander (C), 394 votes.

Permanent substitutions:

- Carl-Axel Johansson (M) resigned on 13 September 2004 and was replaced by Ewa Thalén Finné (M) on 14 September 2004.

==== 1990s ====
===== 1998 =====
Results of the 1998 general election held on 20 September 1998:

Party		Votes per municipality											Total votes	%	Seats		
Party		Burlöv	Käv- linge	Lomma	Lund	Sjöbo	Skurup	Staffans- torp	Svedala	Trelle- borg	Vel- linge	Ystad	Total votes	%	Con.	Lev.	Tot.
Swedish Social Democratic Party	S	4,237	6,137	3,571	17,875	3,192	2,778	4,598	4,999	10,188	4,796	6,004	68,375	35.48%	5	0	5
Moderate Party	M	1,967	4,038	4,456	19,075	2,565	1,965	3,826	2,659	4,920	9,760	4,382	59,613	30.93%	4	0	4
Christian Democrats	KD	549	1,206	1,354	5,433	1,015	743	1,144	1,032	2,133	2,100	1,366	18,075	9.38%	1	0	1
Left Party	V	627	960	410	5,875	630	509	625	686	1,551	472	1,149	13,494	7.00%	1	0	1
Liberal People's Party	FP	297	571	620	5,801	292	238	473	306	535	747	683	10,563	5.48%	0	1	1
Centre Party	C	197	578	286	1,945	940	739	434	402	803	482	828	7,634	3.96%	0	0	0
Green Party	MP	257	372	359	3,763	280	259	305	319	654	351	493	7,412	3.85%	0	1	1
Other parties		301	702	443	1,423	524	322	504	350	1,451	795	741	7,556	3.92%	0	0	0
Valid votes		8,432	14,564	11,499	61,190	9,438	7,553	11,909	10,753	22,235	19,503	15,646	192,722	100.00%	11	2	13
Rejected votes		158	368	246	1,523	302	237	244	262	499	293	481	4,613	2.34%			
Total polled		8,590	14,932	11,745	62,713	9,740	7,790	12,153	11,015	22,734	19,796	16,127	197,335	83.53%			
Registered electors		10,383	17,787	13,334	73,838	12,618	10,087	14,065	13,062	28,216	22,469	20,389	236,248				
Turnout		82.73%	83.95%	88.08%	84.93%	77.19%	77.23%	86.41%	84.33%	80.57%	88.10%	79.10%	83.53%				

The following candidates were elected:

- Constituency seats (personal mandates) - Gun Hellsvik (M), 10,526 votes.
- Constituency seats (party mandates) - Inga Berggren (M), 711 votes; Caroline Hagström (KD), 273 votes; Morgan Johansson (S), 824 votes; Anita Jönsson (S), 827 votes; Lars Lindblad (M), 1,046 votes; Ronny Olander (S), 1,764 votes; Catherine Persson (S), 1,317 votes; Karin Svensson Smith (V), 976 votes; Ewa Thalén Finné (M), 651 votes; and Karin Wegestål (S), 2,511 votes.
- Levelling seats (party mandates) - Matz Hammarström (MP), 483 votes; and Ulf Nilsson (FP), 483 votes.

Permanent substitutions:

- Gun Hellsvik (M) resigned on 28 February 2001 and was replaced by Carl-Axel Johansson (M) on 1 March 2001.

===== 1994 =====
Results of the 1994 general election held on 18 September 1994:

Party		Votes per municipality											Total votes	%	Seats		
Party		Burlöv	Käv- linge	Lomma	Lund	Sjöbo	Skurup	Staffans- torp	Svedala	Trelle- borg	Vel- linge	Ystad	Total votes	%	Con.	Lev.	Tot.
Swedish Social Democratic Party	S	5,201	7,737	4,365	21,873	4,053	3,767	5,285	5,794	13,560	5,720	8,060	85,415	42.54%	5	0	5
Moderate Party	M	2,012	4,081	4,649	18,249	2,531	2,103	3,708	2,902	5,223	9,716	4,605	59,779	29.77%	4	0	4
Liberal People's Party	FP	464	890	1,081	7,766	309	391	933	597	907	1,302	840	15,480	7.71%	1	0	1
Centre Party	C	255	842	432	3,028	1,459	1,127	691	646	1,381	768	1,346	11,975	5.96%	1	0	1
Green Party	MP	263	488	376	4,326	346	319	366	353	774	468	639	8,718	4.34%	0	1	1
Left Party	V	275	358	193	3,589	242	242	241	327	659	235	440	6,801	3.39%	0	0	0
Christian Democratic Unity	KDS	165	312	397	1,874	204	147	324	317	606	675	331	5,352	2.67%	0	0	0
New Democracy	NyD	168	225	214	628	177	163	347	203	525	519	321	3,490	1.74%	0	0	0
Other parties		198	351	151	669	1,036	259	131	216	278	233	277	3,799	1.89%	0	0	0
Valid votes		9,001	15,284	11,858	62,002	10,357	8,518	12,026	11,355	23,913	19,636	16,859	200,809	100.00%	11	1	12
Rejected votes		179	317	211	1,215	166	148	261	209	398	348	319	3,771	1.84%			
Total polled		9,180	15,601	12,069	63,217	10,523	8,666	12,287	11,564	24,311	19,984	17,178	204,580	89.16%			
Registered electors		10,282	17,354	13,068	70,499	12,468	10,113	13,580	12,850	27,695	21,587	19,946	229,442				
Turnout		89.28%	89.90%	92.36%	89.67%	84.40%	85.69%	90.48%	89.99%	87.78%	92.57%	86.12%	89.16%				

The following candidates were elected: Inga Berggren (M); Bo Bernhardsson (S); Margitta Edgren (FP); Per Gahrton (MP); Per Olof Håkansson (S); Gun Hellsvik (M); Anita Jönsson (S); Ronny Olander (S); Rune Rydén (M); Per Stenmarck (M); Kerstin Warnerbring (C); and Karin Wegestål (S).

Permanent substitutions:

- Per Stenmarck (M) resigned on 8 October 1995 and was replaced by Annika Jonsell (M) on 9 October 1995.
- Per Gahrton (MP) resigned on 21 October 1995 and was replaced by Bodil Francke Ohlsson (MP) on 22 October 1995.
- Bo Bernhardsson (S) resigned on 31 December 1995 and was replaced by Catherine Persson (S) on 1 January 1996.
