= Compulsory sterilisation in Sweden =

Sources. Chart showing the number of sterilisations reported to the central authority, the National Swedish Board of Health or the National Board of Health and Welfare, between 1935 and 1979 and the various indications for operations performed between 1941 and 1975. An unknown number of men were sterilised abroad or illegally in Sweden. This may have been the cause of the lower number of operations during the early 1970s. When, from January 1976, permission was no longer needed, the number of sterilisations grew considerably.

Sweden carried out compulsory sterilizations between 1906 and 2013 on eugenic, medical, and social grounds. From 1972 to 2013, sterilization was also a condition for gender reassignment surgery.

== Legal grounds ==
In 1922 the State Institute of Racial Biology was founded in Uppsala. In the 1930s, a law was passed that allowed mass sterilisation. The stated rationale behind the legislation was to prevent sterilisation from becoming a contraceptive method in the hands of the individual.

Another law, passed in 1941, was more far reaching and stated three broad grounds on which sterilisation could be carried out:

- Medical, if a pregnancy could pose a risk to life or good health of a woman with chronic illness or permanently weakened constitution.
- Eugenic, which allowed sterilising people considered insane or with severe illness or with a physical disability, so that these traits are not passed on the offspring.
- Social, which allowed sterilising people deemed unsuitable to foster a child due to mental illness, being feebleminded or having an antisocial lifestyle.

The law did not foresee any age of consent limit. However, it was never legal to physically restrain a person.

== Statistics ==
The number of eugenic sterilisations peaked in the 1940s; from 1946, the number of sterilisations under the 1941 legal provisions gradually decreased.

In 1997, on behalf of the Swedish government, the ethnologists Mikael Eivergård and Lars-Eric Jönsson made an attempt at estimating what percentage of sterilisations were coerced. They found that a quarter of the applications were made under circumstances similar to coercion such as a condition for release from an institution and that another 9 percent were signed under pressure. In half of the cases they found no sign of coercion or pressure, but signs of the applicants' own initiative. Tydén uses these percentages to make an estimate of the number of operations under coercion. He found that 15,000 were made as a condition for release and that another 5500 to 6000 were made under other kinds of pressure, whereas 30,000 were voluntary and on the applicants' own initiative.

According to a 2000 government report, 21,000 people were estimated to have been forcibly sterilised, 6,000 were coerced into a "voluntary" sterilisation while the nature of a further 4,000 cases could not be determined.

From the 2000s, the Swedish state paid out damages to victims who filed for compensation.

== Sterilisation and gender reassignment surgery ==
Until 2013, sterilisation was mandatory before gender reassignment surgery. This last mandatory sterilisation has been criticised by several political parties in Sweden and since 2011 the Parliament of Sweden was expected to change the law but ran into opposition from the Christian Democrat party. After efforts to overturn the law failed in parliament, the Stockholm Administrative Court of Appeal overturned the law on 19 December 2012, declaring it unconstitutional after the law was challenged by an unidentified plaintiff.

22 May 2013 vote in the Parliament of Sweden
Party	Votes for	Votes against	Abstained	Absent (Did not vote)
Swedish Social Democratic Party	102: Christer Adelsbo; Carina Adolfsson Elgestam; Ann-Christin Ahlberg; Urban Ahlin; Johan Andersson; Phia Andersson; Lennart Axelsson; Ibrahim Baylan; Håkan Bergman; Hannah Bergstedt; Bo Bernhardsson; Patrik Björck; Catharina Bråkenhielm; Sven-Erik Bucht; Clas-Göran Carlsson; Gunilla Carlsson; Cecilia Dalman Eek; Adnan Dibrani; Susanne Eberstein; Hans Ekström; Tomas Eneroth; Christer Engelhardt; Kerstin Engle; Lars Eriksson; Matilda Ernkrans; Kenneth G. Forslund; Isak From; Agneta Gille; Marie Granlund; Monica Green; Jonas Gunnarsson; Billy Gustafsson; Kerstin Haglö; Lena Hallengren; Arhe Hamednaca; Jörgen Hellman; Shadiye Heydari; Hans Hoff; Peter Hultqvist; Carina Hägg; Kent Härstedt; Leif Jakobsson; Eva-Lena Jansson; Peter Jeppsson; Ann-Kristine Johansson; Lars Johansson; Morgan Johansson; Ylva Johansson; Peter Johnsson; Mattias Jonsson; Håkan Juholt; Anders Karlsson; Annelie Karlsson; Sara Karlsson; Yilmaz Kerimo; Kurt Kvarnström; Katarina Köhler; Hillevi Larsson; Jan-Olof Larsson; Lars Mejern Larsson; Désirée Liljevall; Teres Lindberg; Åsa Lindestam; Elin Lundgren; Johan Löfstrand; Louise Malmström; Pyry Niemi; Ingemar Nilsson; Jennie Nilsson; Kerstin Nilsson; Kristina Nilsson; Ingela Nylund Watz; Carina Ohlsson; Fredrik Olovsson; Hans Olsson; Jasenko Omanovic; Christina Oskarsson; Peter Persson; Helene Petersson; Helén Pettersson; Leif Pettersson; Raimo Pärssinen; Carin Runeson; Gunnar Sandberg; Lena Sommestad; Eva Sonidsson; Maria Stenberg; Thomas Strand; Gunilla Svantorp; Per Svedberg; Suzanne Svensson; Björn i von Sydow; Anna-Lena Sörenson; Olle Thorell; Hans Unander; Börje Vestlund; Tommy Waidelich; Meeri Wasberg; Anders Ygeman; Christina Zedell; Karin Åström; Krister Örnfjäder	-	-	10: Ann Arleklo; Mikael Damberg; Annika Duàn; Caroline Helmersson Olsson; Berit Högman; Fredrik Lundh Sammeli; Pia Nilsson; Marie Nordén; Veronica Palm; Ardalan Shekarabi
G Moderate Party	102: Anton Abele; Boriana Åberg; Maria Abrahamsson; Amir Adan; Anette Åkesson; Christer Akej; Jan R. Andersson; Jörgen Andersson; Staffan Anger; Sofia Arkelsten; Ann-Britt Åsebol; Lena Asplund; Metin Ataseven; Anti Avsan; Gunnar Axén; Hanif Bali; Lars Beckman; Eva Bengtson Skogsberg; Finn Bengtsson; Ulf Berg; Sten Bergheden; Per Bill; Elisabeth Björnsdotter Rahm; Carl-Oskar Bohlin; Helena Bouveng; Cecilia Brinck; Anne Marie Brodén; Nils Brown; Katarina Brännström; Stefan Caplan; Mikael Cederbratt; Margareta Cederfelt; Åsa Coenraads; Sedat Dogru; Bino Drummond; Lars Elinderson; Annicka Engblom; Jan Ericson; Thomas Finnborg; Lotta Finstorp; Johan Forssell; Susanna Haby; Pia Hallström; Ann-Charlotte Hammar Johnsson; Krister Hammarbergh; Anders Hansson; Lars Hjälmered; Gustaf Hoffstedt; Christian Holm; Johan Hultberg; Cristina Husmark Pehrsson; Jonas Jacobsson Gjörtler; Isabella Jernbeck; Bengt-Anders Johansson; Johan Johansson; Mats Johansson; Ellen Juntti; Peter Jutterström; Ulrika Karlsson; Margareta B. Kjellin; Olof Lavesson; Eva Lohman; Kajsa Lunderquist; Cecilia Magnusson; Betty Malmberg; Göran Montan; Gustav Nilsson; Ulrik Nilsson; Gunilla Nordgren; Andreas Norlén; Edip Noyan; Marta Obminska; Lotta Olsson; Jenny Petersson; Jessica Polfjärd; Saila Quicklund; Patrick Reslow; Anna Rheyneuclaudes Kihlman; Edward Riedl; Henrik Ripa; Jessica Rosencrantz; Hans Rothenberg; Jan-Evert Rådhström; Björn Samuelson; Fredrik Schulte; Karl Sigfrid; Lars-Arne Staxäng; Elisabeth Svantesson; Michael Svensson; Henrik i von Sydow; Cecilie Tenfjord-Toftby; Ewa Thalén Finné; Tomas Tobé; Jessika Vilhelmsson; Abdirizak Waberi; Peder Wachtmeister; Hans Wallmark; Camilla Waltersson Grönvall; Linda Wemmert; Cecilia Widegren; Rune Wikström; Oskar Öholm	-	-	5: Boriana Åberg; Jan R. Andersson; Sten Bergheden; Reza Khelili Dylami; Björn Hamilton
Green Party	23: Jabar Amin; Stina Bergström; Per Bolund; Agneta Börjesson; Bodil Ceballos; Esabelle Dingizian; Tina Ehn; Magnus Ehrencrona; Gunvor G. Ericson; Jonas Eriksson; Peter Eriksson; Maria Ferm; Ulf Holm; Helena Leander; Annika Lillemets; Jan Lindholm; Agneta Luttropp; Valter Mutt; Lise Nordin; Kew Nordqvist; Mats Pertoft; Åsa Romson; Peter Rådberg	-	-	2: Gustav Fridolin; Mehmet Kaplan
G Liberal People's Party	21: Tina Acketoft; Gunnar Andrén; Gulan Avci; Hans Backman; Anita Brodén; Emma Carlsson Löfdahl; Eva Flyborg; Karin Granbom Ellison; Roger Haddad; Carl B. Hamilton; Ismail Kamil; Stefan Käll; Nina Larsson; Maria Lundqvist-Brömster; Ulf Nilsson; Christer Nylander; Johan Pehrson; Anna Steele; Lars Tysklind; Barbro Westerholm; Allan Widman	-	-	3: Jan Ertsborn; Nina Lundström; Christer Winbäck
G Centre Party	21: Anders Ahlgren; Anders Åkesson; Abir Al-Sahlani; Daniel Bäckström; Ulrika Carlsson; Staffan Danielsson; Fredrick Federley; Inger Fredriksson; Ola Johansson; Per-Ingvar Johnsson; Emil Källström; Johan Linander; Helena Lindahl; Göran Lindell; Per Lodenius; Kerstin Lundgren; Karin Nilsson; Rickard Nordin; Annika Qarlsson; Åsa Torstensson; Solveig Zander	-	-	2: Anders W. Jonsson; Per Åsling
Sweden Democrats	-	20: Jonas Åkerlund; Jimmie Åkesson; Thoralf Alfsson; Stellan Bojerud; Kent Ekeroth; Josef Fransson; Anna Hagwall; Carina Herrstedt; Mikael Jansson; Richard Jomshof; Mattias Karlsson; Olle Larsson; David Lång; Adam Marttinen; Per Ramhorn; Johnny Skalin; Sven-Olof Sällström; Björn Söder; Markus Wiechel; Tony Wiklander	-	-
Left Party	17: Bengt Berg; Marianne Berg; Torbjörn Björlund; Josefin Brink; Rossana Dinamarca; Jens Holm; Siv Holma; Christina Höj Larsen; Jacob Johnson; Amineh Kakabaveh; Hans Linde; Lars Ohly; Eva Olofsson; Lena Olsson; Kent Persson; Jonas Sjöstedt; Mia Sydow Mölleby	-	-	2: Ulla Andersson; Wiwi-Anne Johansson
G Christian Democrats	12: Anders Andersson; Yvonne Andersson; Annika Eclund; Penilla Gunther; Robert Halef; Emma Henriksson; Lars-Axel Nordell; Irene Oskarsson; Désirée Pethrus; Anders Sellström; Caroline Szyber; Roland Utbult	-	4: Annelie Enochson; Mikael Oscarsson; Magnus Sjödahl; Tuve Skånberg	3: Andreas Carlson; Lars Gustafsson; Mats Odell
Total	298	20	4	27

== See also ==
- Reproductive rights
- History of eugenics
