= Cilla Dahl Andersson =

Swedish politician (born 1971)

Member of the Riksdag
- Incumbent
- Assumed office 28 September 2026
- Constituency: Skåne County Southern

Member of the Riksdag
- In office 2002–2006
- Constituency: Malmö Municipality

Personal details
- Born: 20 November 1971 (age 54) Trelleborg Municipality, Sweden
- Party: Swedish Social Democratic Party

Cilla Dahl Andersson (born 20 November 1971) is a Swedish politician from the Social Democratic Party. She has been a member of the Riksdag since 2026, elected for the constituency of Skåne County Southern. She also served as a substitute in the Riksdag for a period in 2002.

== Background ==
Dahl Andersson has worked in social work and as a folk high school teacher. Before her parliamentary assignment in 2026, she worked at Östra Grevie folkhögskola, where she trained social educators. She herself studied at three folk high schools and worked at as others.

== Political activities ==
Dahl Andersson has been a politician since 1988.

=== Riksdag ===
Dahl Andersson served as a substitute in the Riksdag from 5 November to 20 December 2002. During this period, she was a deputy on the Committee on the Labour Market and the Committee on the Constitution.

In the 2026 Swedish general election, she was elected to the Riksdag. Since 6 October 2026, she has been a deputy member of the Committee on Environment and Agriculture and the Committee on Industry and Trade.

== See also ==
- List of members of the Riksdag, 2002–2006
- List of members of the Riksdag, 2026–2030
