= Ronny Olander =

Swedish politician (born 1949)

Member of the Riksdag
- In office 3 October 1994 – 4 October 2010
- Constituency: Skåne County South

Personal details
- Born: 1949 (age 76–77)
- Party: Social Democratic Party

Ronny Reinhold Olander (born 1949) is a Swedish politician and former member of the Riksdag, the national legislature. A member of the Social Democratic Party, he represented Skåne County South between October 1994 and October 2010.
