= Amanda Thonander =

Swedish politician (born 1996)

Member of the Riksdag
- Incumbent
- Assumed office 28 September 2026
- Constituency: Skåne County Southern

Personal details
- Born: 18 December 1996 (age 29)
- Party: Moderate Party

Amanda Elina Linnéa Thonander (born 18 December 1996) is a Swedish politician who was elected member of the Riksdag in 2026. She is the chairwoman of the Moderate Women in Lund Municipality.
