= Adrian Magnusson =

Swedish politician (born 1994)

Member of the Riksdag
- Incumbent
- Assumed office 26 September 2022
- Constituency: Skåne Southern

Personal details
- Born: 1994 (age 31–32)
- Party: Social Democrats

Adrian Magnusson (born 1994) is a Swedish politician. He was elected as Member of the Riksdag in September 2022. He represents the constituency of Skåne Southern. He is affiliated with the Social Democrats.
