= Rikard Larsson =

Swedish politician (born 1966)

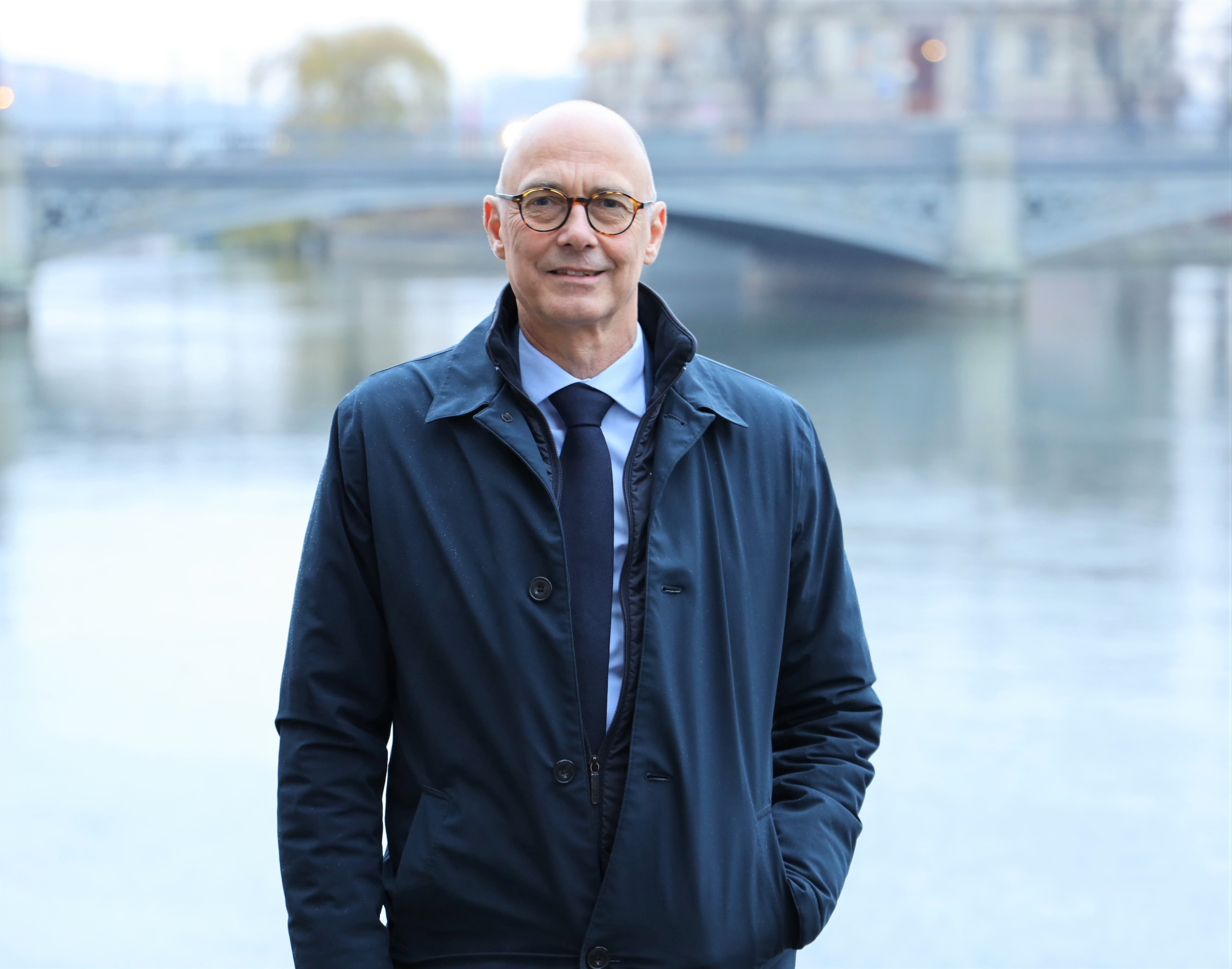
- Larsson in 2022

Member of the Riksdag
- In office 29 September 2014 – 26 September 2022
- Constituency: Skåne County South

Personal details
- Born: 1966 (age 59–60)
- Party: Social Democratic Party

Bo Rikard Larsson (born 1966) is a Swedish politician and former member of the Riksdag, the national legislature. A member of the Social Democratic Party, he represented Skåne County South between September 2014 and September 2022.

In the 2014 parliamentary election, he was elected as a member of the Swedish Riksdag. In the Riksdag, he was a deputy member of the Transport Committee and the Justice Committee from 2014 to 2018, as well as a member of the Swedish delegation to the Nordic Council. During the 2018–2022 term, he was vice-chairman of the Social Insurance Committee.
