= Marianne Fundahn =

Swedish politician (born 1967)

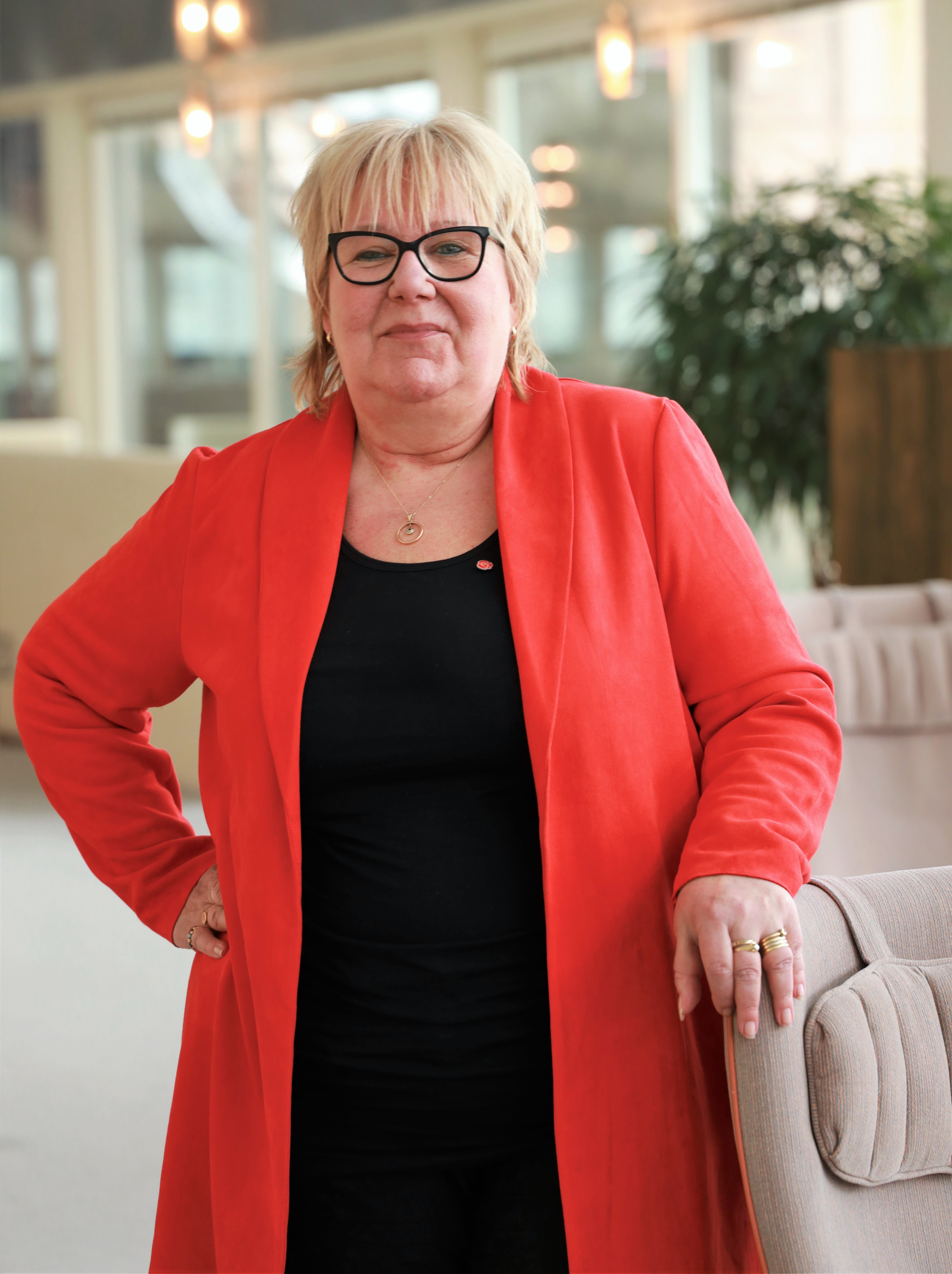
- Fundahn in March 2021

Member of the Riksdag
- Incumbent
- Assumed office 24 September 2018
- Constituency: Skåne County South

Personal details
- Born: Carina Marianne Pettersson; 1958 (age 67–68)
- Party: Social Democratic Party

Carina Marianne Fundahn (née Pettersson; born 1967) is a Swedish politician and member of the Riksdag, the national legislature. A member of the Social Democratic Party, she has represented Skåne County South since September 2018.
