= Emma Berginger =

Swedish politician (born 1986)

Member of the Riksdag
- Incumbent
- Assumed office 20 May 2022
- In office 24 September 2018 – 19 September 2021
- Constituency: Skåne Southern

Personal details
- Born: 1986 (age 39–40)
- Party: Green Party

Emma Berginger (born 1986) is a Swedish politician. Since September 2018, she has served as Member of the Riksdag representing the constituency of Skåne Southern. She was also elected as Member of the Riksdag in September 2022. She took a leave of absence from 20 September 2021 till 19 May 2022.

She serves as transport policy spokesperson for the Green Party.
