= Camilla Mårtensen =

Swedish politician (born 1970)

Member of the Riksdag
- In office 2022–2025
- Constituency: Skåne County Southern

Personal details
- Born: 1970 (age 55–56) Malmöhus County, Sweden
- Party: Liberals

Camilla Madelene Mårtensen (formerly Karlsson; born 1970) is a Swedish politician from the Liberals. She was elected to the Riksdag in the 2022 general election.

== See also ==
- List of members of the Riksdag, 2022–2026
