= Lars Lindblad =

Swedish politician (born 1971)

Lars Lindblad (born 1971) is a Swedish politician of the Moderate Party. He was a member of the Riksdag from 1998 to 2010, and held the position as leader of the parliament group from 2006 to 2010 (Swedish title; Gruppledare för Riksdagsgruppen).

== Political career ==
Lars Lindblad served as a member of the Riksdag from 1998 to 2010, representing the southern constituency of Skåne County.

He was the parliamentary group leader for the Moderate Party from 2006 to 2010. Lindblad was a member of the Committee on Environment and Agriculture (2002–2006) and the Committee on European Union Affairs (2003–2006). During his tenure as group leader, he also served on the War Delegation, the Riksdag Board, and the Advisory Council on Foreign Affairs.

In addition, he held deputy positions in the Finance Committee, Defence Committee, Environment and Agriculture Committee, and the EU Committee, and was a deputy member of the Swedish delegation to the Nordic Council.

In early 2010, Lindblad announced that he would not seek re-election.
