= Hanna Lindqvist =

Swedish politician (born 2004)

- Lindqvist in 2026

Member of the Riksdag
- Incumbent
- Assumed office 28 September 2026
- Constituency: Skåne County Southern

Personal details
- Born: 4 April 2004 (age 22)
- Party: Green Party

Hanna Catarina Lindqvist (born 4 April 2004) is a Swedish politician who was elected member of the Riksdag in 2026. She has served as co-spokesperson of the Young Greens since 2025.
