= Victoria Tiblom =

Swedish politician (born 1969)

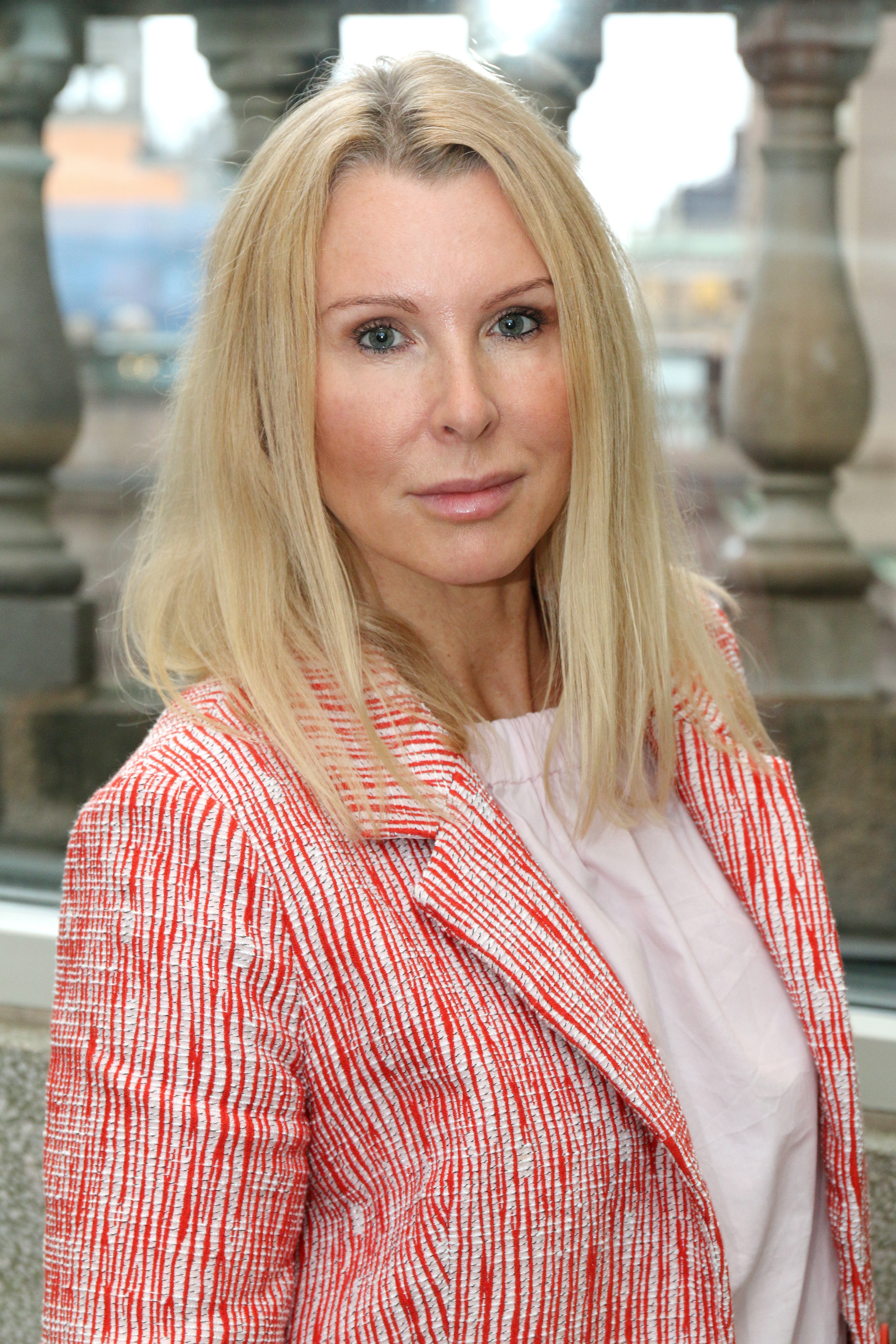

Member of the Riksdag
- Incumbent
- Assumed office 26 September 2022
- Constituency: Skåne Southern

Personal details
- Born: 21 October 1969 (age 56) Lund, Sweden
- Party: Sweden Democrats
- Education: San Diego State University; Stockholm University

Victoria Anna Eva Tiblom (born 21 October 1969) is a Swedish politician of the Sweden Democrats party who has served as a member of the Riksdag for the Skåne Southern constituency since 2022.

== Biography ==
Tiblom was born in Sundsvall but grew up in Stockholm before moving to Helsingborg and later Lund as an adult. She spent part of her upbringing in Louisville, Kentucky as an exchange student and studied at San Diego State University and Stockholm University. After graduating, she worked as a public relations consultant and in communications for various companies. She also lived for a couple of years in Beijing, China.

She was a group leader for the Sweden Democrats party in Lund and a member of the municipal council, 2018-2022. For the 2022 Swedish general election, she stood as a candidate for the Skåne Southern and described security, crime and schools as her campaign priorities. Tiblom also opposes shutting down Sweden's nuclear power plants. She was elected to the constituency during the election.

Tiblom has also described herself as fluent in several languages on her personal profile and is married with two sons.

== See also ==
- List of members of the Riksdag, 2022–2026
