= Hanna Gunnarsson =

Swedish politician (born 1983)

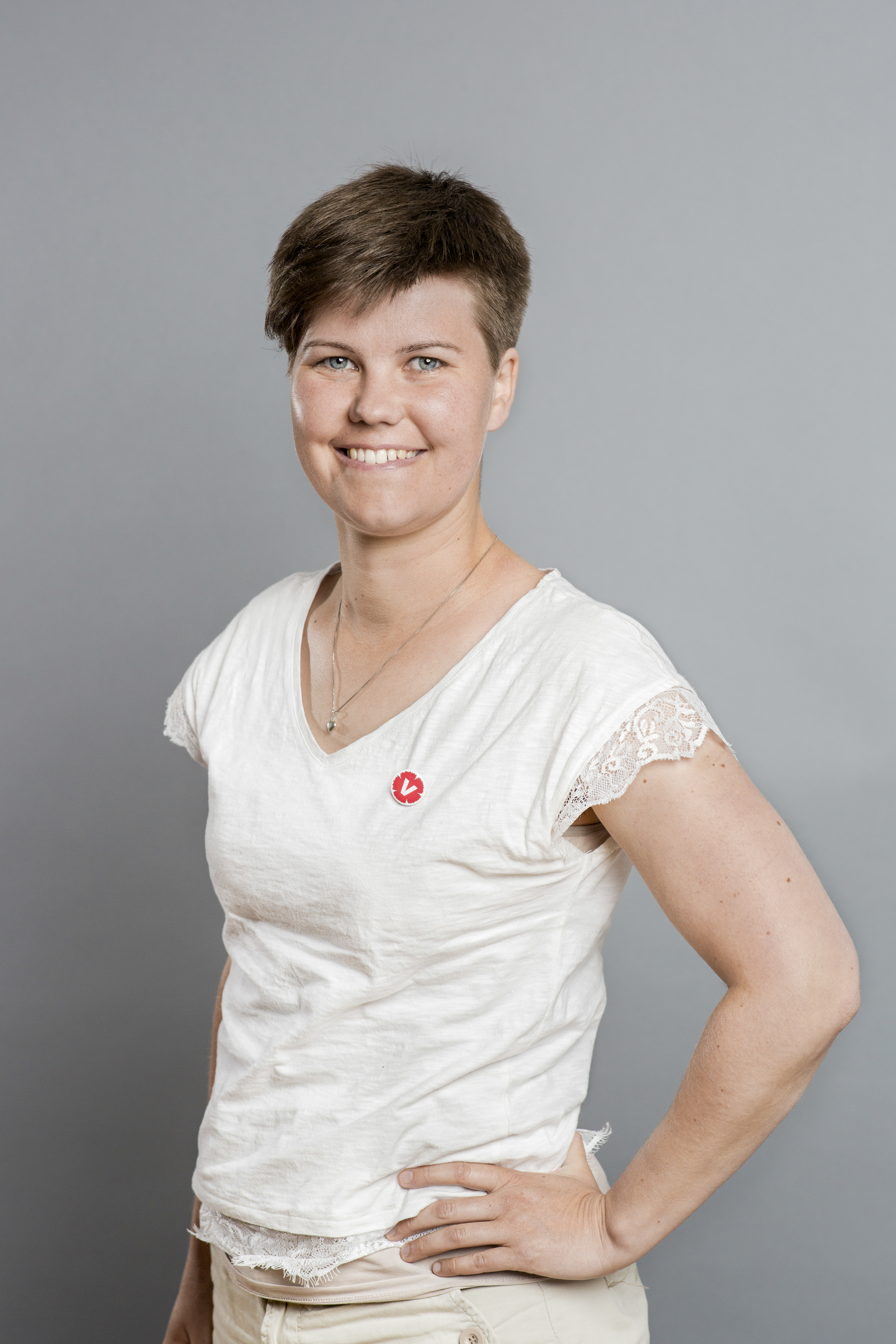
- Gunnarsson in 2018

Member of the Riksdag
- Incumbent
- Assumed office 24 September 2018
- Constituency: Skåne Southern

Personal details
- Born: 1983 (age 42–43)
- Party: Left Party

Hanna Gunnarsson (born 1983) is a Swedish politician. Since September 2018, she serves as Member of the Riksdag. She was again elected as Member of the Riksdag in September 2022. She represents the constituency of Skåne Southern. She is affiliated with the Left Party.
