= Björn Söder =

Swedish politician (born 1976)

Björn Söder SD
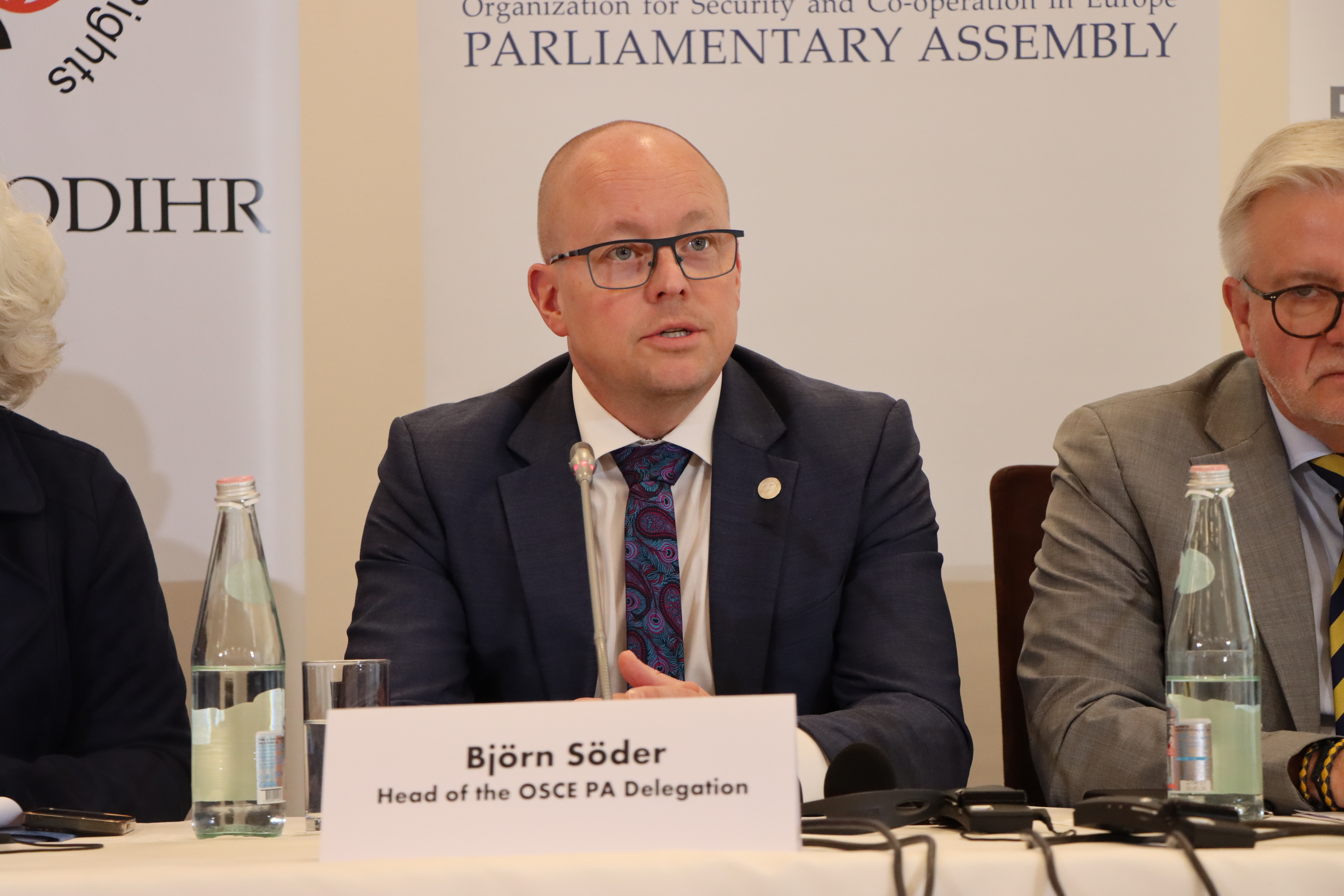
- Söder in 2025

Member of the Riksdag
- Incumbent
- Assumed office 4 October 2010
- Constituency: Skåne Northern and Eastern

Second Deputy Speaker of the Riksdag
- In office 29 September 2014 – 24 September 2018
- Monarch: Carl XVI Gustaf
- Preceded by: Ulf Holm
- Succeeded by: Lotta Johnsson Fornarve

Leader of the Sweden Democrats in the Riksdag
- In office 4 October 2010 – 29 September 2014
- Leader: Jimmie Åkesson
- Preceded by: New office
- Succeeded by: Mattias Karlsson

Secretary of the Sweden Democrats
- In office 7 May 2005 – 14 February 2015
- Leader: Jimmie Åkesson
- Preceded by: David Lång
- Succeeded by: Richard Jomshof

Personal details
- Born: Björn Olof Söder; 3 January 1976 (age 50) Höganäs Municipality, Sweden
- Party: Sweden Democrats
- Education: Lund Institute of Technology
- Awards: Mkhitar Gosh MedalCertificate of Appreciation by Taipei Mission in Sweden
- Website: bjornsoder.net

Björn Olof Söder (born 3 January 1976) is a Swedish politician who served as Second Deputy Speaker of the Riksdag from September 2014 to September 2018. He has been a Member of the Riksdag (SD) for Stockholm County since October 2010. He previously served as Leader of the Sweden Democrats in the Riksdag from 2010 to 2014 and Secretary of the Sweden Democrats from 2005 to 2015.

== Background and education ==
Söder was born in Höganäs Municipality, Skåne County, Sweden. After he had completed upper secondary education (gymnasium) in 1995, he began engineering studies at Lund University. Between 1997 and 1998, he made his compulsory military service at the K 3 regiment in Karlsborg. After finishing his military service he started to study again but took a break between 2000 and 2002, to work as an information technology consultant. He finished his studies in 2004, when he earned a Master of Engineering degree in chemical engineering from the Lund Institute of Technology. Before being elected to parliament, Söder founded a web design business with SD leader Jimmie Åkesson.

== Political career ==
=== Early political career ===
Söder first joined the Swedish Progress Party in 1991, but left the party in 1994, after internal struggles and instead joined the Sweden Democrats. He was elected as a substitute member of the party board in 1997, but left the board to serve as secretary of the Sweden Democrat Youth between 1998 and 2000. Between 1998 and 2002, he was a member of the municipal council in Höör Municipality for the Sweden Democrats. In 2001, he was again elected as a member of the party board and later the same year of the party executive committee. In the same year he was also elected as a member of the church assembly of the Diocese of Lund and as a substitute member of the church assembly of the Church of Sweden.

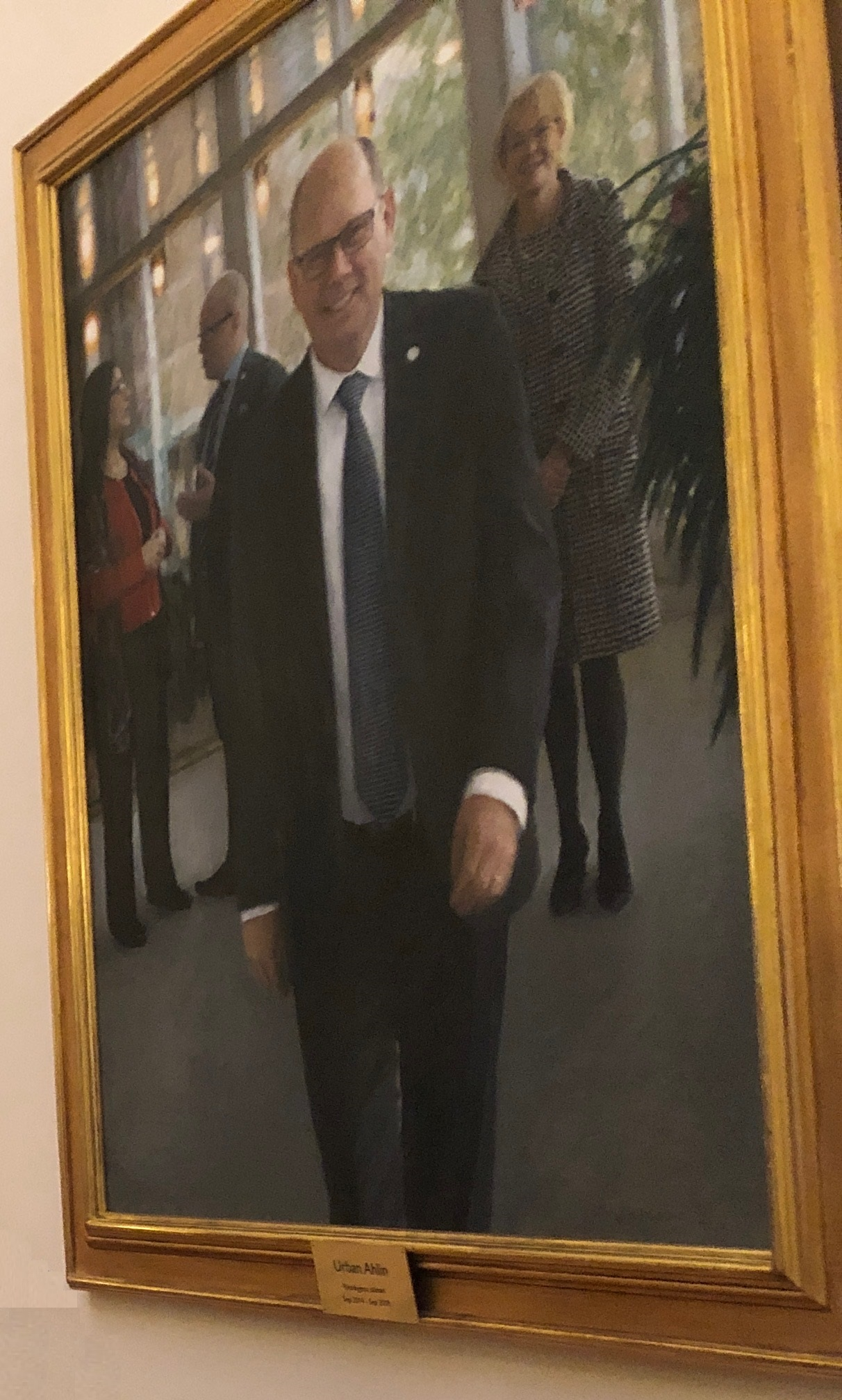
Official portrait of the Speaker of the Riksdag for Urban Ahlin. He became the first speaker include the three deputy speakers of his term in his portret. Björn Söder, Ewa Thalén Finné, Esabelle Dingizian

At the Sweden Democrats' national meeting in 2003, Söder was elected as deputy party chairman. He left this post at the national meeting in 2005, when he was elected as party secretary. In 2005, he was once again elected as a member of the church assembly of the Diocese of Lund and as a full member of the church assembly of the Church of Sweden. Between 2006 and 2010, Söder was a member and party group leader of the Sweden Democrats in the Scania Regional Council as well as a member of the municipal council in Helsingborg Municipality.

=== Member of the Riksdag (2010–) ===
In the 2010 general election, the Sweden Democrats for the first time entered the Riksdag with 5.70% of the votes and Söder, placed second on the party's national ballot, was elected as a Member of the Riksdag (SD) along with 19 other Sweden Democrats politicians. On 24 September 2010, he was elected as group leader of the Sweden Democrats in the Riksdag.

On 19 July 2021 Söder was awarded the Mkhitar Gosh Medal by president Armen Sarksyan and presented by the Armenian ambassador to Sweden Alexander Arzoumanian. Björn was awarded the medal for his work on the Armenian genocide and for working on making the Swedish government recognize the genocide. Also receiving medals were fellow MPs Markus Wiechel and Arin Karapet as well as Martin Brozek, the International advisor of the Riksdag who all received the Medal of Honour of the National Assembly of Armenia.

== Controversies ==
=== 2012 comments about Eurovision ===
After Sweden's victory in the 2012 Eurovision Song Contest, he expressed disappointment and shame that the song was performed in English and not Swedish. After a massive backlash, he deleted the comment from his social media pages, and said that he now realizes that the Eurovision song contest "apparently is a holy cow that must not be criticized in any way, just like multiculturalism."

=== 2014 allegations of antisemitism ===
The Jerusalem Post reported in 2014 that Björn Söder declared in an interview that most people of Jewish origin, who have become Swedes, leave their Jewish identity and that it is important to distinguish between citizenship and nationhood. Lena Posner Körösi, of the Official Council of Jewish Communities in Sweden told The Guardian that Söder’s statements were “exactly like in 1930s Germany” and that they constitute “good old right-wing anti-Semitism". The statement of the Sweden Democrat politician about Jews was listed as one of the ten worst anti-Semitic incidents in the world in 2014 by the Simon Wiesenthal Center, according to Dagens Nyheter.

Söder responded to these claims of anti-Semitism with a column of his own that appeared in The Jerusalem Post on 5 January 2015, writing in part, "In a biased article in one of Sweden’s largest newspapers, Dagens Nyheter (DN: Daily News), some of my statements were dramatically taken out of context to erroneously credit me with opinions that do not correspond with reality. Politically biased journalists and political opponents have further distorted the statements, resulting in a presentation virtually the complete opposite of my actual statements and opinions. This is now distributed in the international press, such as in the Post, which therefore necessitates a clarification on my part."

=== Comments about LGBT people ===
In 2007, Söder was criticised after writing a blog post in which he claimed that the normalisation of LGBT people would lead to the normalisation of "bestiality and pedophilia", saying that "these sexual deviants are not normal and will never be normal."

Björn Söder
(@BjornSoder)
tweeted:

Swedish:

Jag står upp för att försvara homo- och bisexuellas rättigheter. Men jag kommer aldrig försvara Pride och dess nära – och numera legitima – kopplingar till pedofili och barns involvering i vuxnas sexuella värld.

Translation:

I stand up to defend the rights of gay and bisexual people. But I will never defend Pride and its close – and now legitimate – connections to pedophilia and the involvement of children in the sexual world of adults

2 Aug 2023

In August 2023, Söder faced criticism after posting a tweet during Stockholm Pride that linked "Pride" to pedophilia, as well as accusing Prime Minister Ulf Kristersson of "legitimising pedophilia" for raising a pride flag at his official residence. In a subsequent post, Söder wrote that everyone should be allowed to love who they want "as long as no innocent person is harmed", and added: "But don't mix in children and minors. Then you will face resistance!"

His comments garnered criticism from several government ministers who depended on the Sweden Democrats for support under the Tidö Agreement, including Minister for Foreign Affairs Tobias Billström from the Moderate Party, and Minister for Gender Equality Paulina Brandberg from the Liberals.

The Sweden Democrat house leader in the Riksdag Linda Lindberg said the criticism was aimed at "Pride as an organisation" – for allowing children to participate in pride parades – and not at LGBT+ people as a whole, though she did think the tone was "problematic" and went too far. She also said it was understandable that Söder disliked "an organisation that repeatedly criticises and excludes our party for no reason".

== Music ==
Söder has released music under the name "South Bear Music", including songs that praise Israel, Karl XII and Hepatica, SDs aid organisation.

== Distinctions ==
- Mkhitar Gosh Medal, (Armenia).

Party political offices
Preceded by David Lång	Secretary of the Sweden Democrats; 2005–2015	Succeeded by Richard Jomshof
New title	Leader of the Sweden Democrats in the Swedish Riksdag; 2010–2014	Succeeded by Mattias Karlsson
Political offices
Preceded by Ulf Holm	Second deputy speaker of the Riksdag; 2014–2018	Succeeded by Lotta Johnsson Fornarve
