= Stina Larsson =

Swedish politician (born 1977)

Member of the Riksdag
- Incumbent
- Assumed office 26 September 2022
- Constituency: Skåne Southern

Personal details
- Born: 1977 (age 48–49)
- Party: Centre Party

Stina Larsson (born 1977) is a Swedish politician. Since September 2022, she serves as Member of the Riksdag representing the constituency of Skåne Southern. She is affiliated with the Centre Party. She also served as a substitute member in the Riksdag in 2005 and in 2020.
