= Catherine Persson =

Swedish politician (born 1965)

Catherine Persson (born 1965) is a Swedish Social Democratic politician. She was a member of the Riksdag from 1996 to 2007.
