= Karin Svensson Smith =

Swedish politician (born 1956)

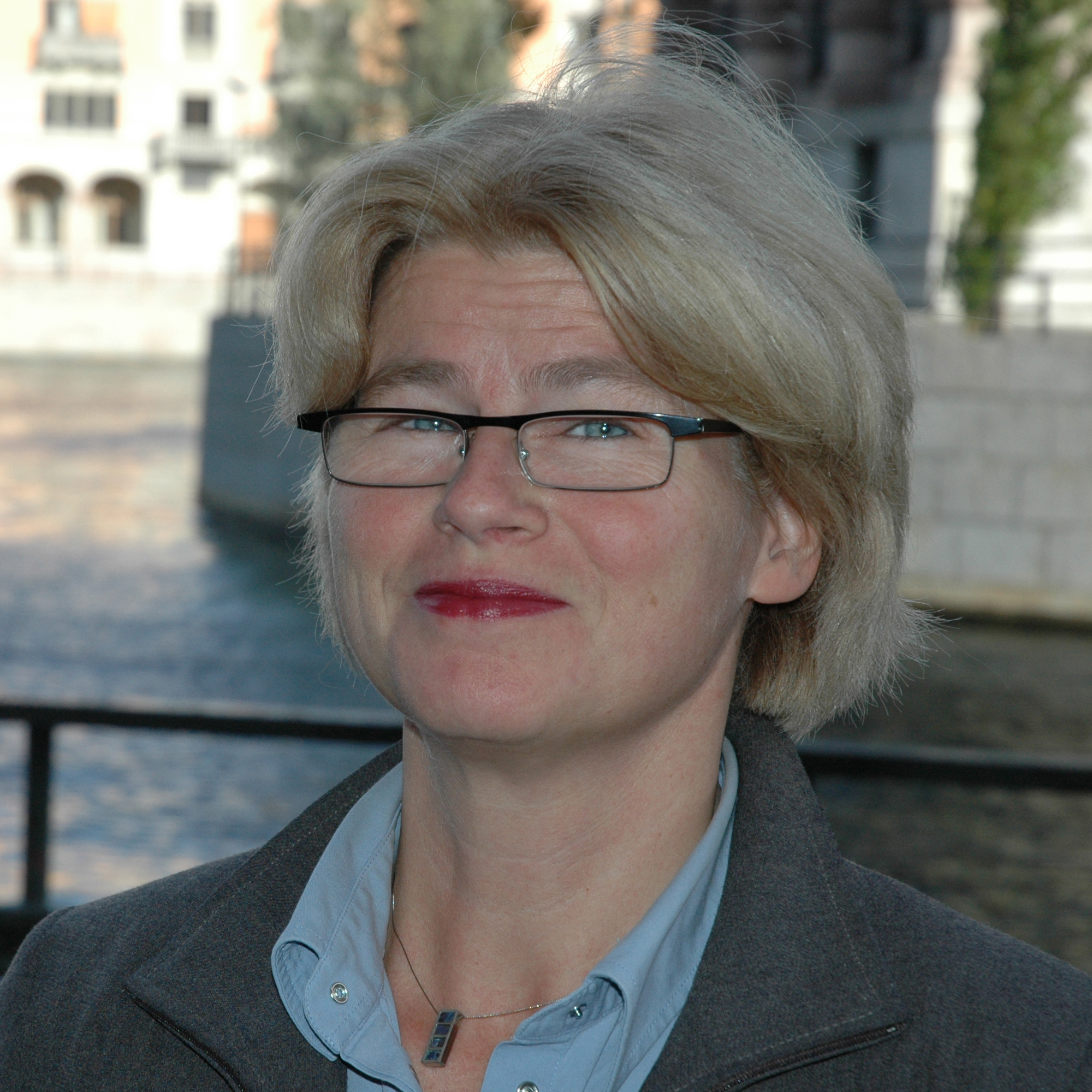

member of the Riksdag
- In office 1998–2018

Personal details
- Born: 11 August 1956 (age 69) Kävlinge, Skåne County
- Party: Green Party; Left Party
- Website: www.svenssonsmith.se

Karin Svensson Smith (born 11 August 1956 in Kävlinge, Skåne County) is a Swedish politician of the Green Party, and formerly of the Left Party. She was a member of the Riksdag from 1998 to 2018. From 1998 to 2005, she represented the Left Party, after which she left the party but not her seat in the Riksdag, and joined the Green Party. From 2005 to 2006 she was therefore formally an unaffiliated member of the Riksdag. In the 2006 election she was elected to the Riksdag for her new party for the election circuit Malmö. In the election in 2010 she was a candidate for the same circuit.

In 2006 she wrote [SOU 2006:72 Öppna möjligheter med alkolås.]
