= Meeri Wasberg =

Swedish politician (born 1973)

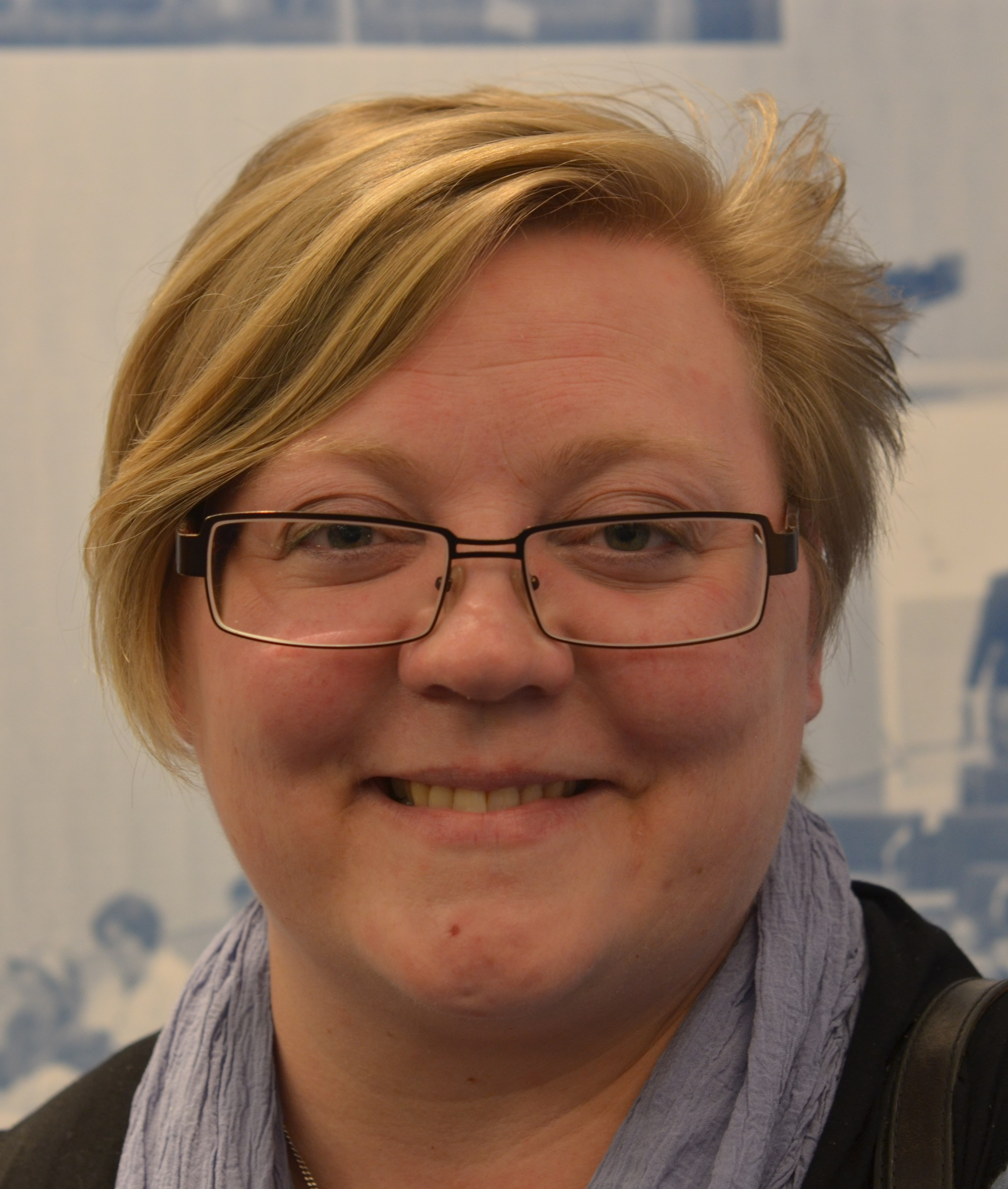
Meeri Wasberg

Meeri Wasberg (born 1973) is a Swedish politician, representing the Social Democrats. Wasberg, who has a background in the Swedish Union of Civil Servants, became a member of parliament in 2012, replacing the deceased parliamentarian Carina Moberg.
