= Boriana Åberg =

Swedish politician (born 1968)

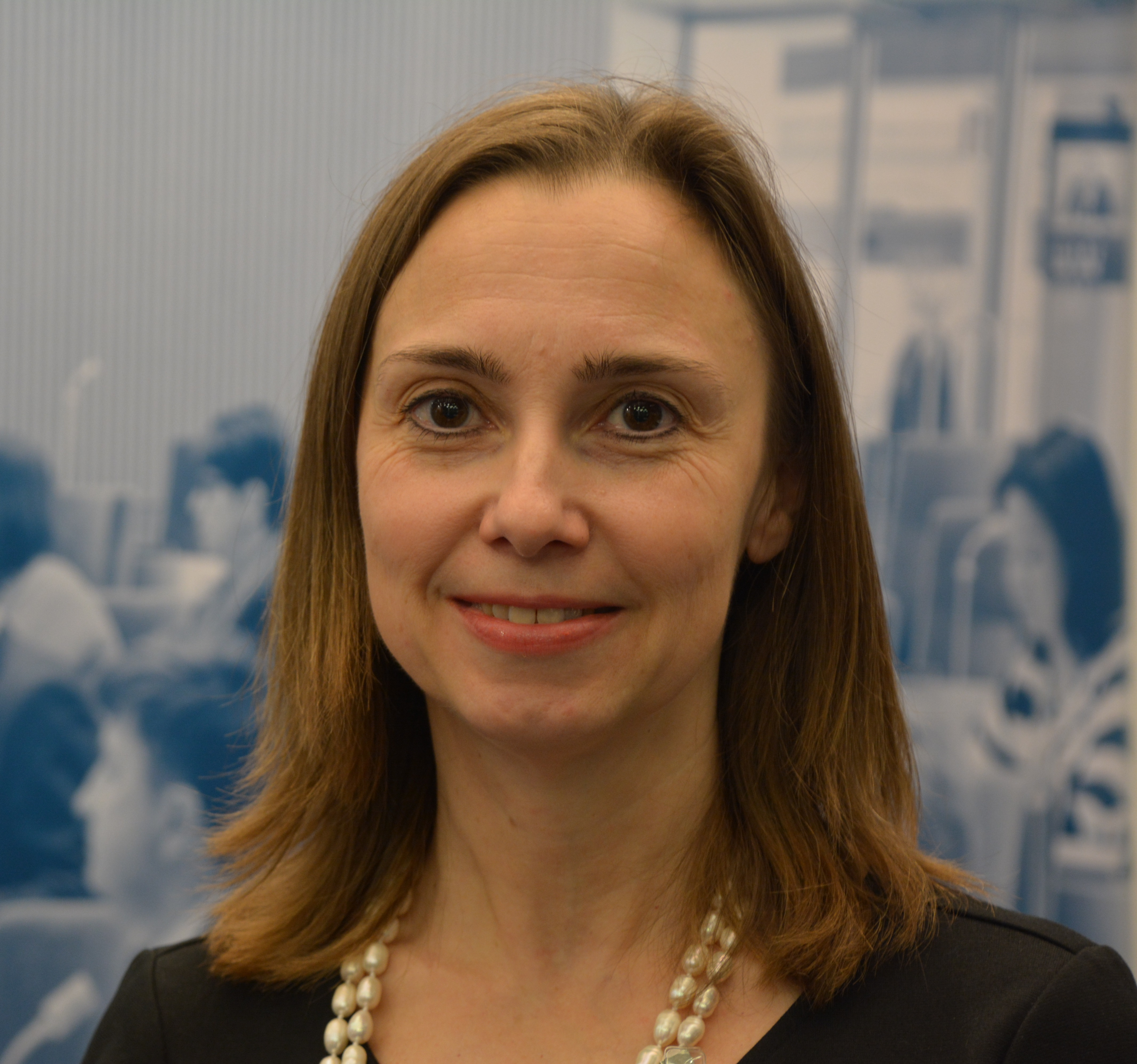
- Boriana Åberg in September 2015

Member of the Swedish Riksdag
- Incumbent
- Assumed office 6 October 2006

Personal details
- Born: 18 November 1968 (age 57) Bulgaria
- Party: Moderate Party
- Occupation: Politician

Boriana Åberg (born 18 November 1968) is a Bulgarian-born Swedish politician who has been a member of the Riksdag since 2008, representing the Skåne County South constituency.

== Early life and career ==
She studied to be a civil engineer in Bulgaria and moved to Sweden after the end of the Cold War. After marrying and having two children, she and her husband divorced after ten years. Åberg found her Bulgarian education useless in Sweden, and as a result returned to school, graduating from Lund University with a degree in sociology and working as a social secretary.

== Political career ==
Åberg joined the Moderate Party in 1998 after liking Carl Bildt's viewpoints and charisma. She became a member of Kävlinge's city council and was appointed chairperson of the council in 2007. She ran for a seat on the Riksdag in 2006 and finished sixth out of 17 candidates; five Moderate candidates ended up on the Riksdag.

In 2008 and 2009, Åberg served as a substitute member for two months; she ran again in 2010, winning a seat on the Riksdag, and was re-elected in 2014. Currently, Åberg serves on the Traffic Committee and the Labor Market Committee. She has been a past member of the Transport and Communications Committee from 2015 until 2018. Since 2018, she has been a member of the Taxation Committee.

In addition to her committee assignments, Åberg has been a member of the Swedish delegation to the Parliamentary Assembly of the Council of Europe (PACE) since 2014, which she has been chairing since 2019. In the Assembly, she has served on the Committee on the Honouring of Obligations and Commitments by Member States of the Council of Europe (since 2020); the Committee on Political Affairs and Democracy (since 2018); the Sub-Committee on External Relations (since 2018); the Sub-Committee on Environment and Energy (2015–2017); and the Committee on Equality and Non-Discrimination (2014–2017). She is the Assembly's co-rapporteur (alongside Kimmo Kiljunen) on Armenia.
