= Louise Meijer =

Swedish politician (born 1990)

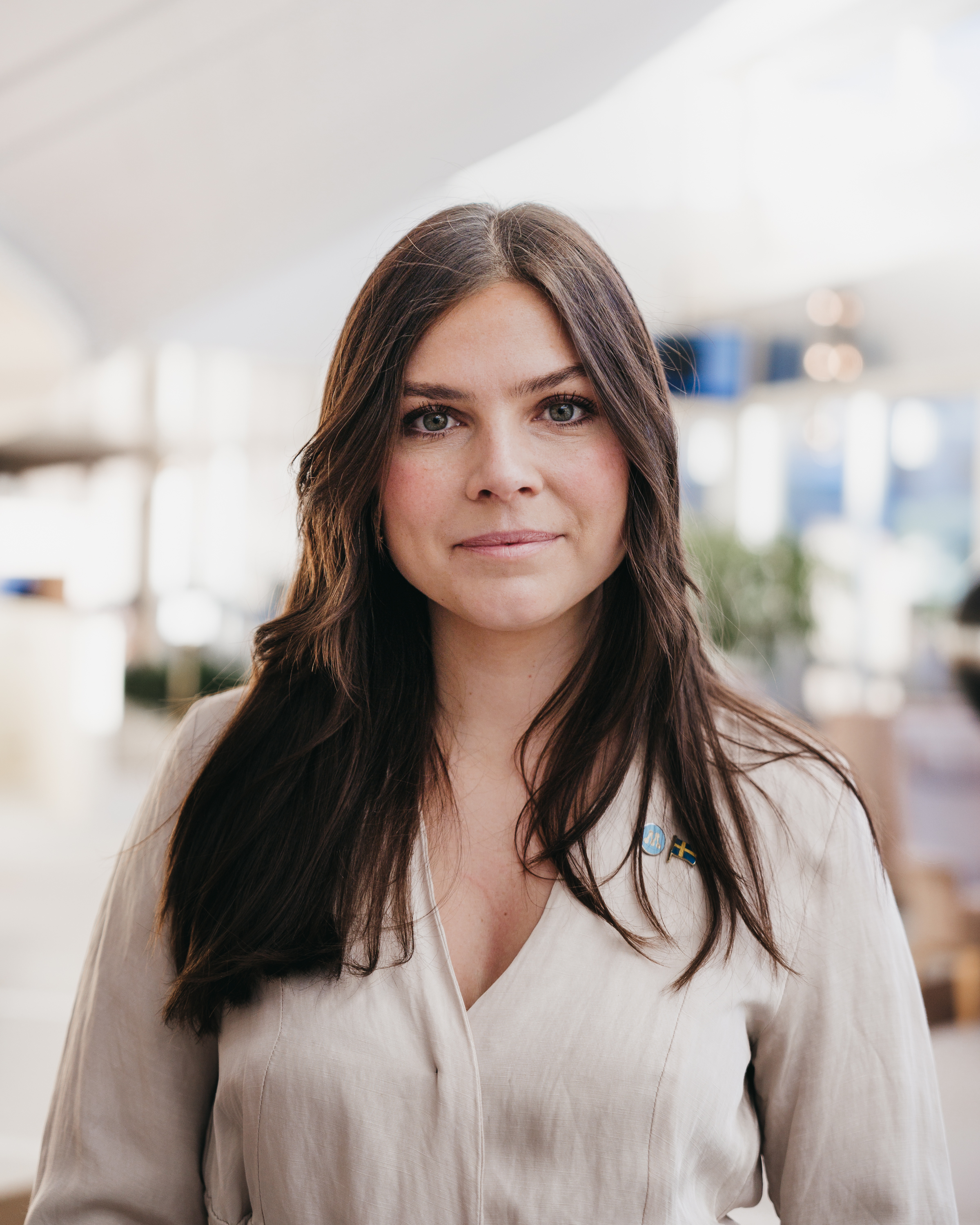
- Meijer in 2023

Member of the Riksdag
- Incumbent
- Assumed office 24 September 2018
- Constituency: Skåne County Southern

Personal details
- Born: 14 August 1990 (age 36)
- Party: Moderate Party

Louise Elsa Christine Meijer (born 14 August 1990) is a Swedish politician serving as a member of the Riksdag since 2018. She has served as deputy chairwoman of the Committee on the Constitution since 2024.
