= Anita Jönsson =

Swedish politician (born 1947)

Solveig Anita Jönsson (born 27 October 1947) is a Swedish social democratic politician. She was a member of the Riksdag from 1988 to 2006.
