= Christine Jönsson =

Swedish politician

Christine Jönsson, born in 1958, is a Swedish politician of the Moderate Party. She has been a member of the Riksdag since 2006.
