= Kerstin Nilsson =

Swedish politician (born 1956)

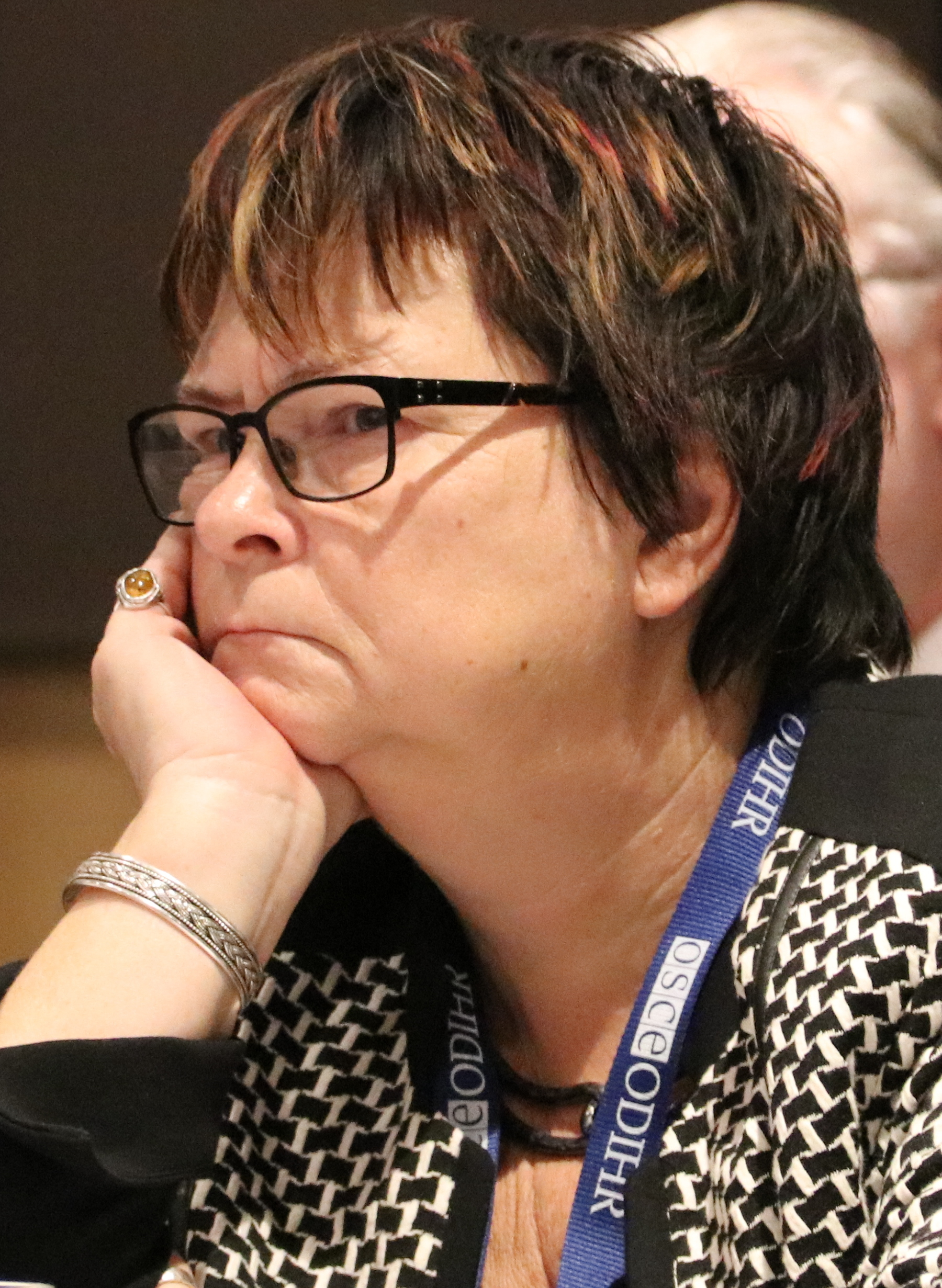
- Born: 1956 (age 69–70)
- Occupation: Politician
- Known for: Member of the Riksdag
- Political party: Social Democratic Party

Kerstin Nilsson (born 1956) is a Swedish Social Democratic Party politician.

She was elected member of the Riksdag for the periods 2010–2014 and 2014–2018, from the Skåne Southern constituency.
