= Committee on Environment and Agriculture =

Swedish parliamentary committee

The (Parliamentary) Committee on Environment and Agriculture (Swedish: Miljö- och jordbruksutskottet, MJU) is a parliamentary committee in the Swedish Riksdag. The committee's main areas of responsibility are the Swedish agricultural industry, agriculture, forestry, policies surrounding gardening, hunting, fishing, and weather forecasting. The committee also handles other matters such as the safety of nuclear power, nature conservation, and environmental protection, along with other matters that do not concern any other of the seventeen committees. Before the 1998/1999 opening of the Riksdag, was the name of the committee Jordbruksutskottet (Committee on Agriculture)

The committee's Speaker is Emma Nohrén, from the Green Party, and the vice-Speaker is Kjell-Arne Ottosson from the Christian Democrats.

== History ==
The Committee on Agriculture was created in 1909 after the decision of the king and the Riksdag, and took over the tasks that were given to the State Committee and the Law Committee. During the time that Sweden was a bicameral state, there were 16 members of parliament serving in the committee from both chambers. The first meeting of the committee was in 1910.

== List of speakers for the committee ==
Name	Period	Political party
Theodor Odelberg	1910–1911	Protectionist Party
Daniel Persson i Tällberg	1912–1915	Liberal Coalition Party (Liberala samlingspartiet)
Raoul Hamilton	1916–1918	Free-minded National Association
Carl Johan Johansson i Uppmälby	1918	Social Democratic Party
Raoul Hamilton	1919–1922	Freeminded People's Party
Olof Nilsson i Tånga	1922–1927	Social Democratic Party
Leonard Tjällgren	1940s and 1950s	Farmers' League (Bondeförbundet)
Einar Larsson	1974-1985	Centre Party
Karl Erik Olsson	1985–1991	Centre Party
Göran Persson	1991–1992	Social Democratic Party
Margareta Winberg	1992–1994	Social Democratic Party
Lennart Daléus	1994–1998	Centre Party
Dan Ericsson	1998–2000	Christian Democrats
Ulf Björklund	2000–2002	Christian Democrats
Per Westerberg	2002–2003	Moderate Party
Catharina Elmsäter-Svärd	2003–2006	Moderate Party
Anders Ygeman	2006–2007	Social Democratic Party
Carina Ohlsson	2007	Social Democratic Party
Anders Ygeman	2007–2010	Social Democratic Party
Matilda Ernkrans	2010–2018	Social Democratic Party
Åsa Westlund	2018	Social Democratic Party
Kristina Yngwe	2018–2020	Centre Party
Ulrika Heie	2020	Centre Party
Kristina Yngwe	2020–2022	Centre Party
Emma Nohrén	2022–	Green Party

== List of vice-speakers for the committee ==
Name	Period	Political party	Notes
Inga-Britt Johansson	1994–1995	Social Democratic Party	
Sinikka Bohlin	1995–2002	Social Democratic Party	
Åsa Domeij	2002–2006	Green Party	
Claes Västerteg	2006–2010	Centre Party	
Bengt-Anders Johansson	2010-2014	Moderate Party	
Lena Ek	2014–2015	Centre Party	
Kristina Yngwe	2015–2018	Centre Party	
Maria Gardfjell	2018–2022	Green Party	
Jessica Rosencrantz	2019	Moderate Party	Second vice-Speaker
Louise Meijer	2019–2020	Moderate Party	Second vice-Speaker
Jessica Rosencrantz	2020–2022	Moderate Party	Second vice-Speaker
Kjell-Arne Ottosson	2022–	Christian Democrats	
