= Ewa Thalén Finné =

Swedish politician

Ewa Thalén Finné MP
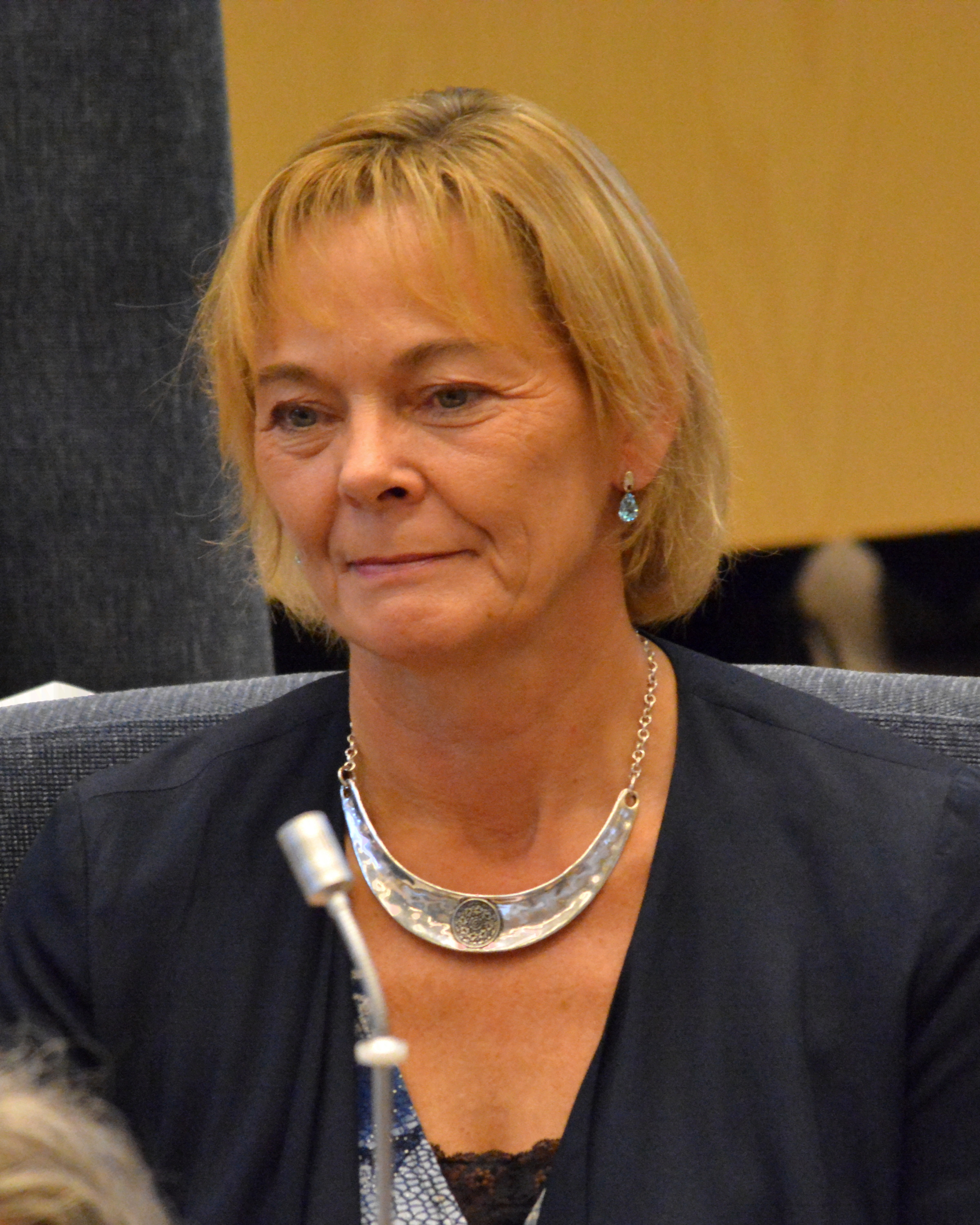

First Deputy Speaker of the Riksdag
- In office 11 October 2017 – 24 September 2018
- Monarch: Carl XVI Gustaf
- Preceded by: Tobias Billström
- Succeeded by: Åsa Lindestam

Member of the Riksdag
- In office 14 September 2004 – 24 September 2018
- In office 5 October 1998 – 30 September 2002
- Constituency: Skåne County

Personal details
- Born: 24 August 1959 (age 66) Stockholm, Sweden
- Party: Moderate Party

Ewa Thalén Finné (born 24 August 1959) is a Swedish Moderate Party politician who served as a First Deputy Speaker of the Riksdag from October 2017 to September 2018. She was Member of the Riksdag from September 2004 to September 2018 and previously from 1998 to 2002.

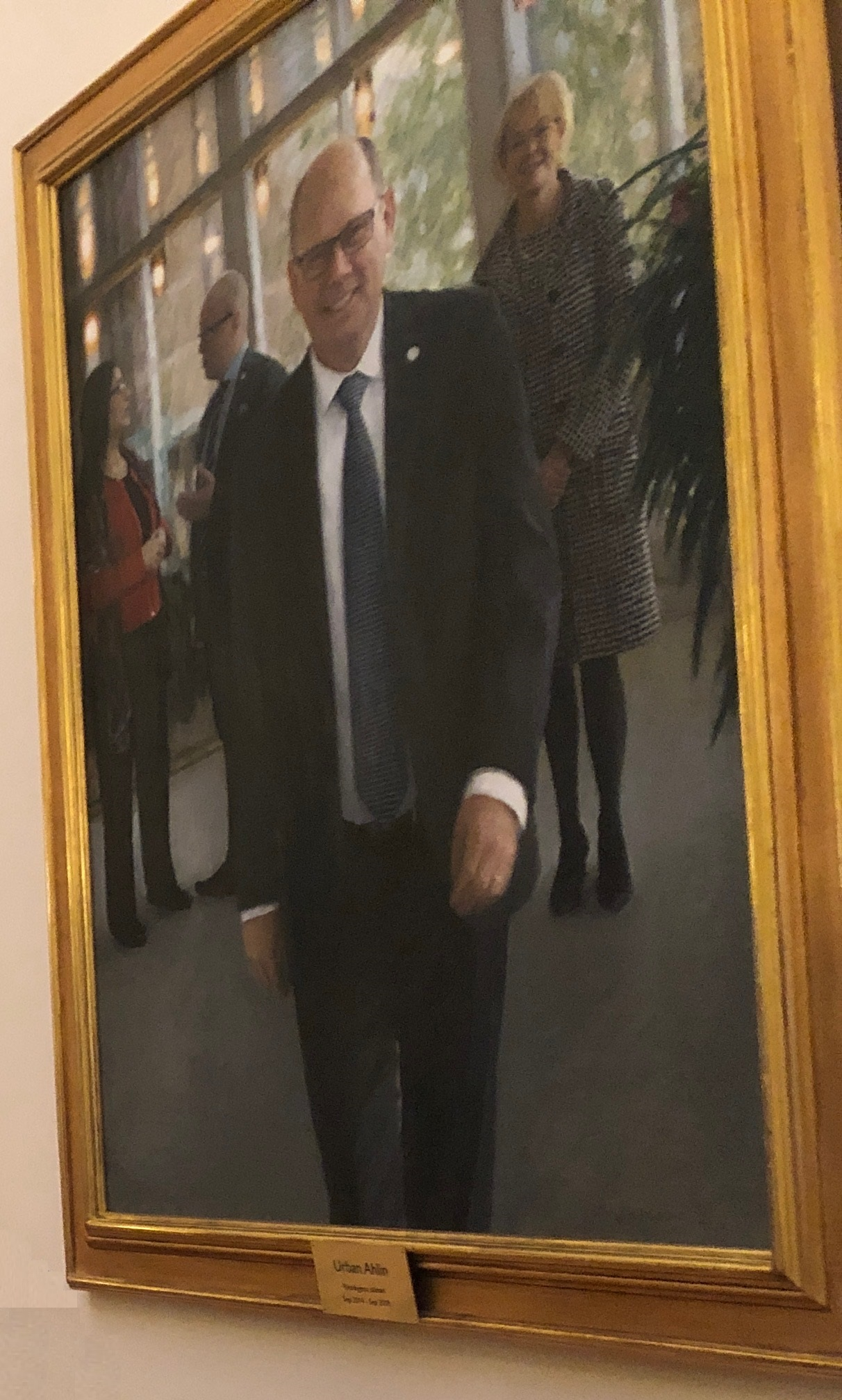
Official portrait of the Speaker of the Riksdag for Urban Ahlin. He became the first speaker include the three deputy speakers of his term in his portret. Ewa Thalén Finné, Esabelle Dingizian, Björn Söder
