= Johan Linander =

Swedish politician (born 1974)

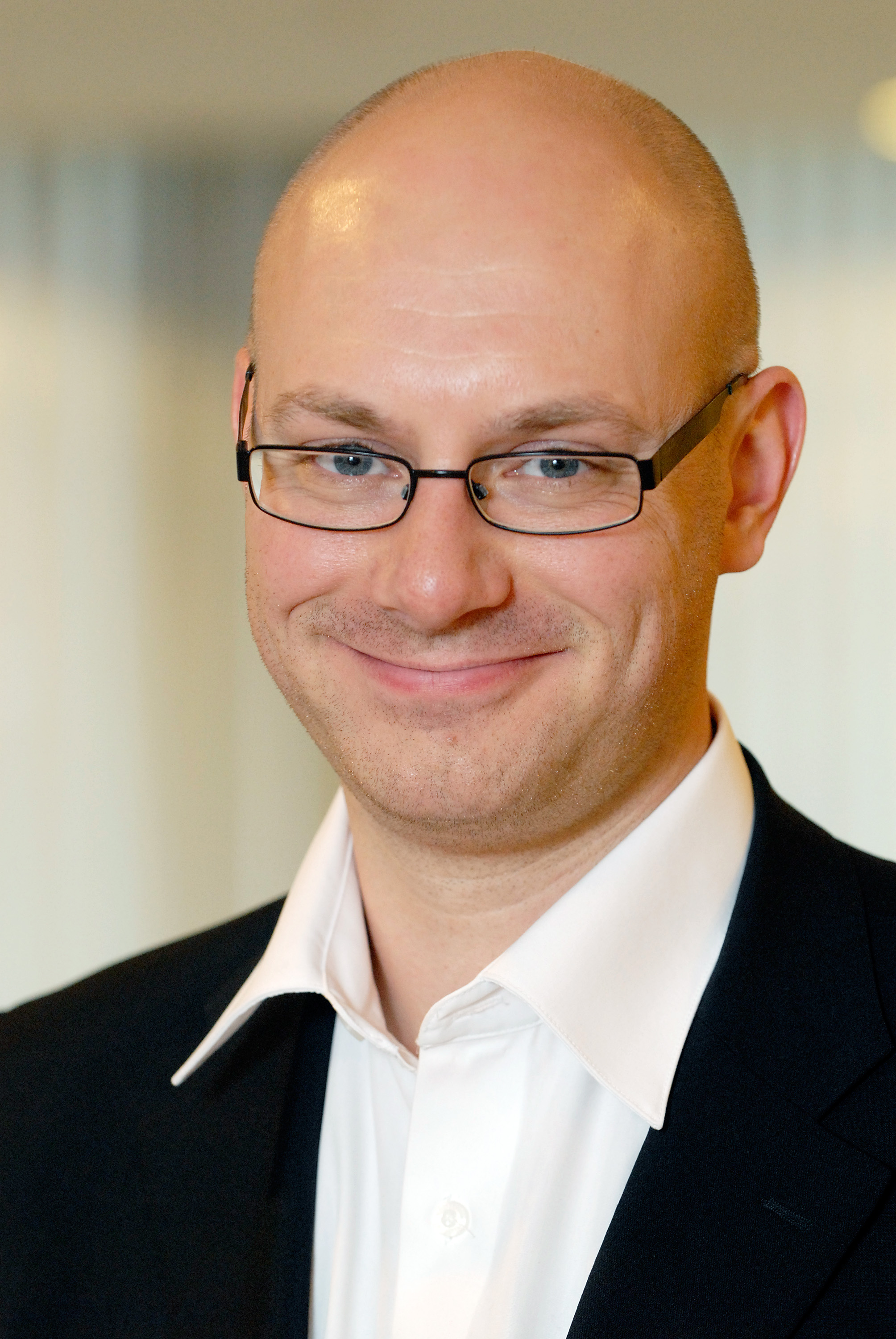

Johan Linander (born 1974) is a Swedish Centre Party politician, member of the Riksdag since 2002.
