= Ulf Nilsson (politician) =

Swedish politician (born 1945)

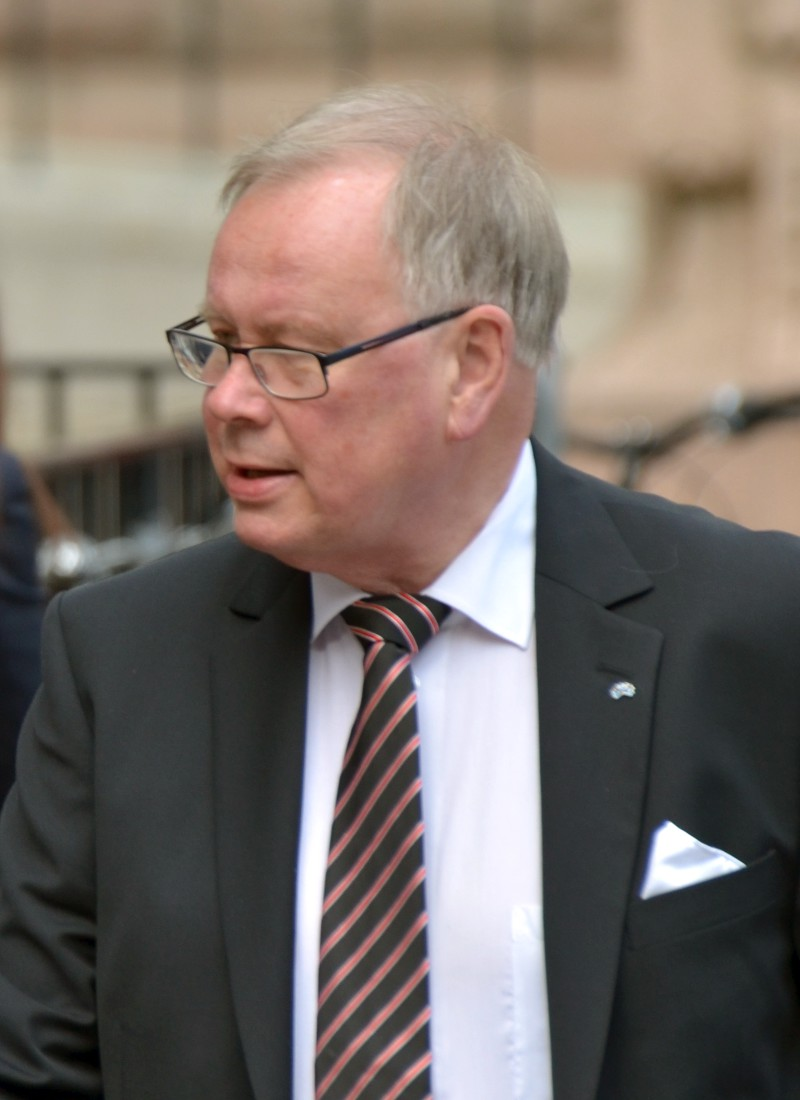
Ulf Nilsson

Ulf Nilsson (born 1945) is a Swedish Liberal People's Party politician, member of the Riksdag since 1998.
