= Bo Bernhardsson =

Swedish politician (born 1949)

Bernhardsson presenting himself at the Gothenburg bookfair 2012.

Bo Gösta Ingemar Bernhardsson (born 19 July 1949) is a Swedish Social Democratic politician, member of the Riksdag 1991–1995 and then again in 2002.
