= Ulf Holm =

Swedish politician (born 1969)

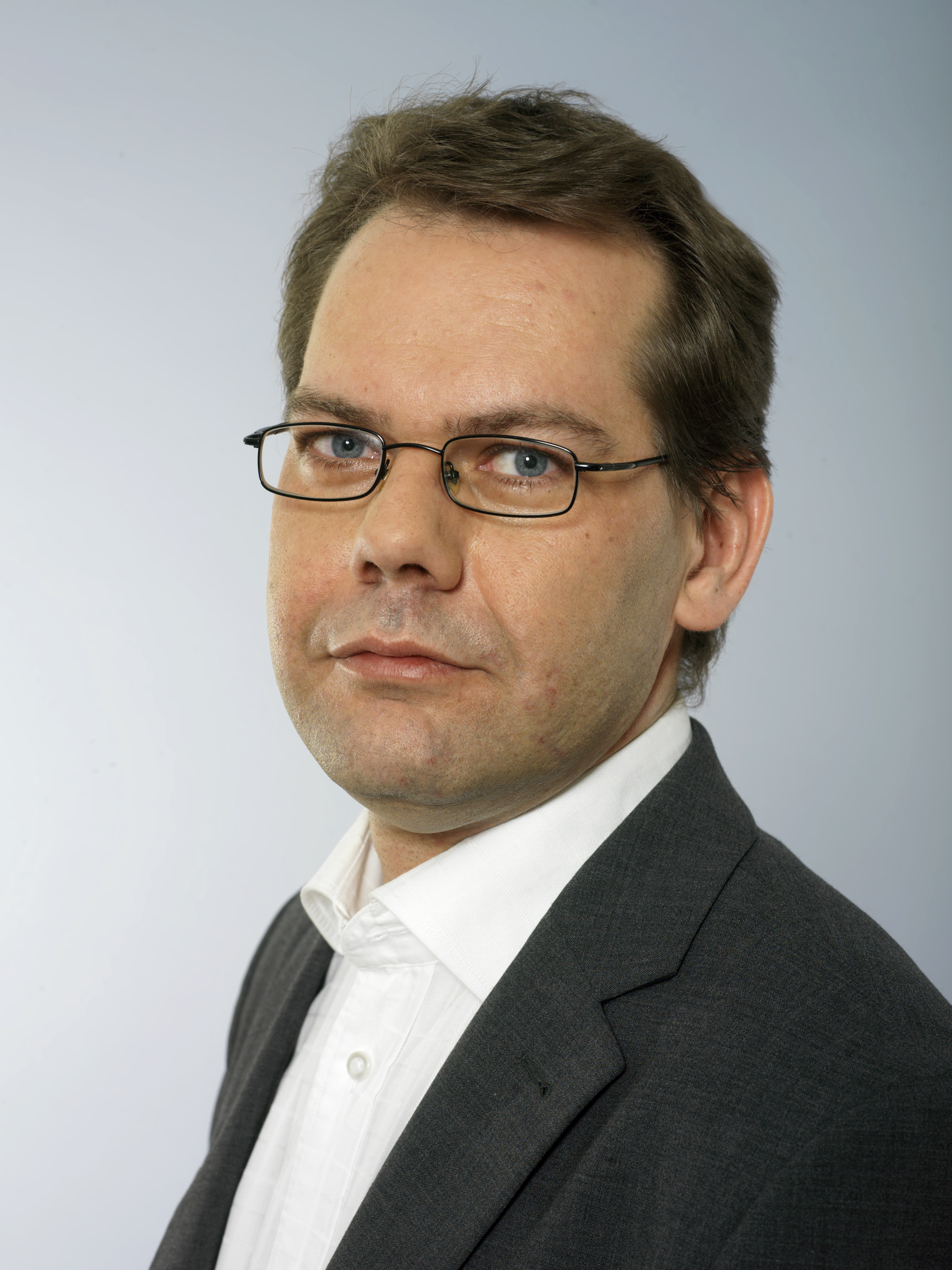

Member of the Riksdag
- In office 2002–2014, 2023–

Member of the European Parliament
- In office 1995–1999

Personal details
- Born: 4 June 1969 (age 56)
- Party: Green Party

Ulf Holm, born 4 June 1969 in Lund, is a Swedish Green Party politician, member of the Riksdag since 2002. He was a member of the European Parliament during 1995–1999. He is openly gay.
