= Norrbotten County (Riksdag constituency) =

Swedish electoral district

- Norrbottens Län
- Constituency for the Riksdag
- Location of Norrbotten County within Sweden
- County: Norrbotten
- Population: 248,918 (2025)
- Electorate: 193,318 (2026)
- Area: 106,016 km^{2} (2026)

Current constituency
- Created: 1970
- Seats: List (Note: Constituency seats only.): 8 (2014–present); 9 (1998–2014)); 10 (1970–1998)
- Member of the Riksdag: List: Linda Frohm (M); Ida Karkiainen (S); Mattias Karlsson (M); Birger Lahti (V); Fredrik Lundh Sammeli (S); Eric Palmqvist (SD); Samuel Pettersson Frank (S); Leonid Yurkovskiy (SD)
- Created from: Norrbotten County

Norrbotten County (Swedish: Norrbottens Län) is one of the 29 multi-member constituencies of the Riksdag, the national legislature of Sweden. The constituency was established in 1970 when the Riksdag changed from a bicameral legislature to a unicameral legislature. It is conterminous with the county of Norrbotten. The constituency currently elects eight of the 349 members of the Riksdag using the open party-list proportional representation electoral system. At the 2026 general election it had 193,318 registered electors.

== Electoral system ==
Norrbotten County currently elects eight of the 349 members of the Riksdag using the open party-list proportional representation electoral system. Constituency seats are allocated using the modified Sainte-Laguë method. Only parties that reach the 4% national threshold and parties that receive at least 12% of the vote in the constituency compete for constituency seats. Supplementary levelling seats may also be allocated at the constituency level to parties that reach the 4% national threshold.

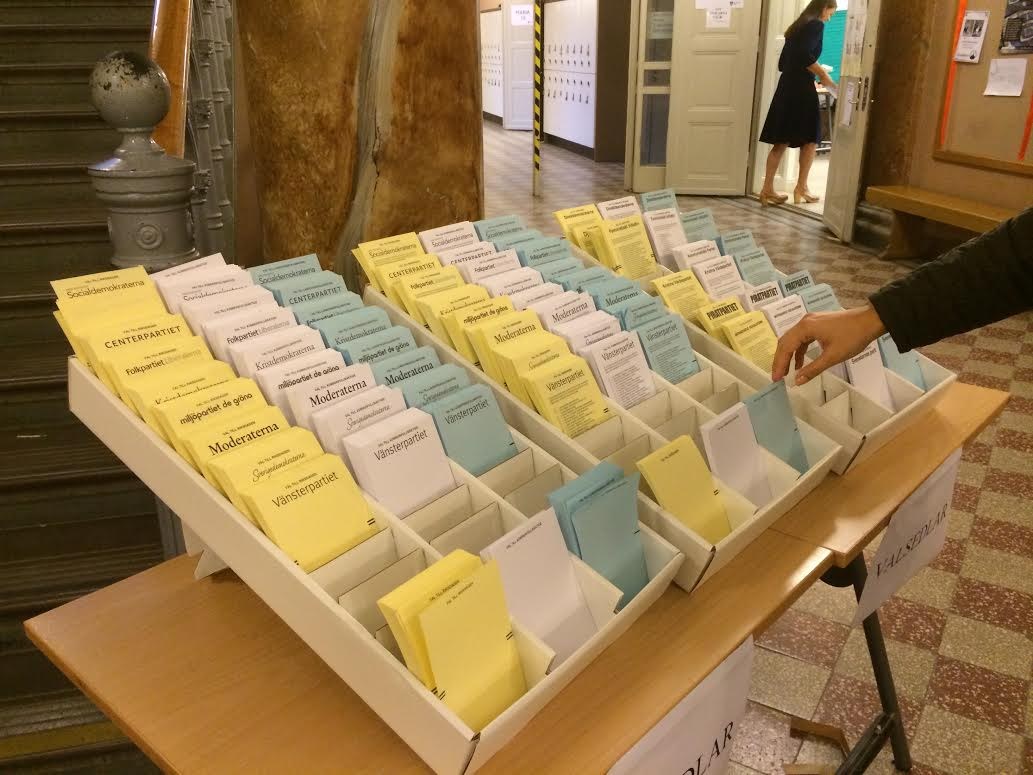
A selection of ballot papers available for voters at the 2014 general election in Stockholm - yellow for the Riksdag, blue for the regional council and white for the municipal council

Prior to 1997 voters could cast any ballot paper they wanted, though it had to contain the name of a party and the name of at least one candidate nominated by that party in the constituency. It was common for parties to hand out ballot papers with their name and list of candidates at the entrance of polling stations. Voters could delete the names of candidates or write-in the names of other candidates but in practice these options weren't used enough by voters to have any significant impact on the results and consequently elections operated as a closed system.

Since 1997, elections in Sweden follow the French model in having separate ballot papers for each party/list in a constituency. There are two ballot papers for each party - a party ballot paper (partivalsedel) with just the name of the party and a name ballot paper (namnvalsedel) with the name of the party and its list of candidates. There are also blank ballot papers (blank valsedel). Voters can initially pick as many ballot papers as they wish and then, in the secrecy of the voting booth, they select a single ballot paper of their choice. If they chose a name ballot paper they have the option of casting a preferential vote for one of their chosen party's candidates. If they chose a blank ballot paper they can write the name of any party including unregistered parties and, optionally, they can write the name of any person as their preferred candidate, even one that does not belong to their chosen party. They then place their chosen ballot paper in an envelope which is placed in the ballot box, discarding all other ballot papers they picked.

Seats won by each party/list in a constituency are allocated to its candidates in order of preference votes (a personal mandate), provided that the candidate has received at least 8% of votes cast for their party in the constituency (5% since January 2011). Any unfilled seats are then allocated to the party's remaining candidates in the order they appear on the party list (a party mandate).

== Election results ==
=== Summary ===
Election	Left V / VPK			Social Democrats S			Greens MP			Centre C			Liberals L / FP / F			Moderates M			Christian Democrats KD / KDS			Sweden Democrats SD		
Election	Votes	%	Seats	Votes	%	Seats	Votes	%	Seats	Votes	%	Seats	Votes	%	Seats	Votes	%	Seats	Votes	%	Seats	Votes	%	Seats
2026	10,996	6.86%	1	60,172	37.52%	3	7,289	4.55%	0	8,238	5.14%	0	5,380	3.35%	0	26,250	16.37%	2	10,342	6.45%	0	29,040	18.11%	2
2022	11,277	6.98%	1	67,235	41.64%	4	5,561	3.44%	0	8,533	5.29%	0	4,094	2.54%	0	21,917	13.57%	1	8,266	5.12%	0	32,780	20.30%	2
2018	17,810	10.69%	1	69,493	41.69%	4	4,604	2.76%	0	11,751	7.05%	1	5,356	3.21%	0	21,299	12.78%	1	7,741	4.64%	0	26,276	15.76%	1
2014	14,225	8.56%	1	80,984	48.73%	5	8,111	4.88%	0	7,513	4.52%	0	5,369	3.23%	0	21,438	12.90%	1	5,048	3.04%	0	18,237	10.97%	1
2010	15,240	9.29%	1	85,035	51.86%	6	8,630	5.26%	0	7,618	4.65%	0	7,082	4.32%	0	26,852	16.38%	2	5,388	3.29%	0	6,309	3.85%	0
2006	16,494	10.53%	1	80,605	51.48%	6	6,350	4.06%	0	10,065	6.43%	1	6,714	4.29%	0	20,926	13.36%	1	6,589	4.21%	0	2,302	1.47%	0
2002	19,712	12.72%	1	74,310	47.95%	6	8,073	5.21%	0	7,905	5.10%	0	10,009	6.46%	1	11,207	7.23%	1	8,239	5.32%	0	424	0.27%	0
1998	35,547	22.18%	2	75,942	47.38%	5	5,377	3.35%	0	6,997	4.37%	0	4,780	2.98%	0	18,914	11.80%	1	10,407	6.49%	1			
1994	19,868	11.42%	1	105,436	60.58%	8	6,165	3.54%	0	9,447	5.43%	0	8,195	4.71%	0	18,008	10.35%	1	4,491	2.58%	0			
1991	15,166	9.06%	1	92,882	55.48%	6	3,942	2.35%	0	12,239	7.31%	1	11,581	6.92%	1	18,377	10.98%	1	7,664	4.58%	0			
1988	17,035	10.25%	1	96,587	58.10%	6	6,002	3.61%	0	14,287	8.59%	1	12,452	7.49%	1	14,082	8.47%	1	4,047	2.43%	0			
1985	18,023	10.35%	1	102,692	58.96%	6	1,433	0.82%	0	17,950	10.31%	1	14,026	8.05%	1	18,988	10.90%	1	with C					
1982	18,130	10.35%	1	103,006	58.81%	7	1,676	0.96%	0	20,310	11.60%	1	5,431	3.10%	0	20,638	11.78%	1	3,828	2.19%	0			
1979	17,713	10.26%	1	95,565	55.37%	6				23,762	13.77%	2	10,211	5.92%	0	17,768	10.30%	1	3,443	1.99%	0			
1976	18,975	11.19%	1	91,182	53.75%	6				30,923	18.23%	2	10,316	6.08%	0	13,742	8.10%	1	3,389	2.00%	0			
1973	21,173	13.45%	1	81,955	52.07%	6				29,085	18.48%	2	8,037	5.11%	0	12,672	8.05%	1	3,283	2.09%	0			
1970	20,602	13.71%	1	77,755	51.73%	5				23,677	15.75%	2	12,587	8.37%	1	11,323	7.53%	1	3,420	2.28%	0			

(Excludes levelling seats. Figures in italics represent alliances/joint lists.)

=== Detailed ===
Party has received at least 4% of the vote nationally and is entitled to compete for constituency seats.

==== 2020s ====
===== 2026 =====
Results of the 2026 general election held on 13 September 2026:

Party		Votes per municipality														Total votes	%	Seats		
Party		Älvs- byn	Arje- plog	Arvids- jaur	Boden	Gälli- vare	Hapa- randa	Jokk- mokk	Kalix	Kiruna	Luleå	Över- kalix	Över- torneå	Pajala	Piteå	Total votes	%	Con.	Lev.	Tot.
Swedish Social Democratic Party	S	2,066	545	1,430	6,951	3,745	1,359	969	4,009	4,814	19,396	723	807	1,081	12,277	60,172	37.52%	3	0	3
Sweden Democrats	SD	907	384	816	3,592	2,602	1,239	503	2,114	2,663	8,035	405	471	851	4,458	29,040	18.11%	2	0	2
Moderate Party	M	832	235	618	3,199	1,601	686	340	1,649	1,903	9,823	266	318	356	4,424	26,250	16.37%	2	0	2
Left Party	V	296	112	255	976	755	226	213	421	1,084	3,953	151	166	504	1,884	10,996	6.86%	1	0	1
Christian Democrats	KD	273	121	258	1,045	744	257	188	673	1,033	3,375	151	244	299	1,681	10,342	6.45%	0	0	0
Centre Party	C	254	74	226	958	258	254	110	464	357	3,091	166	197	127	1,702	8,238	5.14%	0	0	0
Green Party	MP	114	104	104	595	500	91	415	257	931	2,989	24	44	80	1,041	7,289	4.55%	0	0	0
Liberals	L	128	92	145	614	238	134	83	272	341	2,260	61	65	82	865	5,380	3.35%	0	0	0
Örebro Party	ÖP	31	10	27	117	89	19	23	33	71	244	9	7	6	190	876	0.55%	0	0	0
Alternative for Sweden	AfS	23	5	16	82	60	39	27	37	73	247	8	12	25	142	796	0.50%	0	0	0
Christian Values Party	KrVP	10	2	4	36	16	6	0	21	113	47	9	3	22	59	348	0.22%	0	0	0
Ambition Sweden	AS	6	4	4	22	27	3	1	12	15	50	4	0	15	21	184	0.11%	0	0	0
Pirate Party	PP	2	2	2	10	6	1	3	7	19	76	0	2	2	24	156	0.10%	0	0	0
Citizens' Coalition	MED	1	0	4	14	9	2	0	1	5	30	1	0	0	10	77	0.05%	0	0	0
Communist Party of Sweden	SKP	2	0	3	7	6	0	2	0	6	3	1	0	6	7	43	0.03%	0	0	0
Human Rights and Democracy	MoD	1	0	0	3	1	2	0	1	2	25	0	1	1	2	39	0.02%	0	0	0
Independent Rural Party	LPo	2	1	1	1	1	0	0	7	0	13	2	0	0	3	31	0.02%	0	0	0
Direct Democrats	DD	1	0	1	3	2	1	0	1	1	13	0	0	0	4	27	0.02%	0	0	0
United Voice	ER	1	0	0	1	0	0	2	1	2	6	0	1	0	1	15	0.01%	0	0	0
Nordic Resistance Movement	NMR	2	0	0	2	1	0	1	0	0	4	1	1	0	0	12	0.01%	0	0	0
Classical Liberal Party	KLP	7	0	0	0	0	0	0	0	0	1	0	0	0	1	9	0.01%	0	0	0
Donald Duck Party		0	0	2	0	0	0	0	0	1	3	0	0	0	0	6	0.00%	0	0	0
Communist Party	K	0	0	0	0	1	0	0	0	0	3	0	0	1	0	5	0.00%	0	0	0
Unity	ENH	0	1	1	1	0	0	0	0	0	0	0	0	0	1	4	0.00%	0	0	0
Nuance Party	PNy	0	0	0	0	0	0	0	1	0	2	0	0	0	0	3	0.00%	0	0	0
The Push Buttons	Kn	1	0	0	0	0	0	0	1	0	1	0	0	0	0	3	0.00%	0	0	0
United Sweden		1	0	0	0	0	0	0	0	0	1	0	0	0	1	3	0.00%	0	0	0
Volt Sweden	Volt	0	0	0	0	0	0	1	0	0	2	0	0	0	0	3	0.00%	0	0	0
Knowledge-Democratic Party		0	0	0	0	0	0	0	0	0	0	0	0	0	2	2	0.00%	0	0	0
RegleraAI.nu		0	0	0	0	0	0	0	0	2	0	0	0	0	0	2	0.00%	0	0	0
Evil Chicken Party	OKP	0	0	0	0	0	0	0	0	0	0	0	0	0	1	1	0.00%	0	0	0
Forest People		0	1	0	0	0	0	0	0	0	0	0	0	0	0	1	0.00%	0	0	0
Freedom of the Family		0	0	0	0	0	0	0	0	0	1	0	0	0	0	1	0.00%	0	0	0
Peace Party		0	0	0	0	0	0	0	0	0	0	0	0	0	1	1	0.00%	0	0	0
Political Conquest of the Democratic Organisation		0	0	0	0	0	0	0	0	0	1	0	0	0	0	1	0.00%	0	0	0
The Anarchists		0	0	1	0	0	0	0	0	0	0	0	0	0	0	1	0.00%	0	0	0
The Libertarians		0	0	0	0	0	0	0	0	0	1	0	0	0	0	1	0.00%	0	0	0
Turning Point Party	PV	0	0	0	0	0	0	0	0	1	0	0	0	0	0	1	0.00%	0	0	0
Valid votes		4,961	1,693	3,918	18,229	10,662	4,319	2,881	9,982	13,437	53,696	1,982	2,339	3,458	28,802	160,359	100.00%	8	0	8
Blank votes		39	32	38	154	124	38	45	117	164	446	22	18	40	309	1,586	0.98%			
Rejected votes – unregistered parties		1	0	0	4	2	0	1	0	3	16	0	1	1	4	33	0.02%			
Rejected votes – other		4	1	0	19	7	1	3	8	5	93	1	0	4	23	169	0.10%			
Total polled		5,005	1,726	3,956	18,406	10,795	4,358	2,930	10,107	13,609	54,251	2,005	2,358	3,503	29,138	162,147	83.88%			
Registered electors		6,011	2,054	4,719	21,761	13,352	6,341	3,664	12,225	16,724	62,920	2,473	3,096	4,441	33,537	193,318				
Turnout		83.26%	84.03%	83.83%	84.58%	80.85%	68.73%	79.97%	82.67%	81.37%	86.22%	81.08%	76.16%	78.88%	86.88%	83.88%				

The following candidates were elected:

- Constituency seats (personal mandates) - Ida Karkiainen (S), 3,249 votes; Mattias Karlsson (M), 1,635 votes; and Birger Lahti (V), 664 votes.
- Constituency seats (party mandates) - Linda Frohm (M), 852 votes; Fredrik Lundh Sammeli (S), 2,358 votes; Eric Palmqvist (SD), 243 votes; Samuel Pettersson Frank (S), 804 votes; and Leonid Yurkovskiy (SD), 5 votes.

===== 2022 =====
Results of the 2022 general election held on 11 September 2022:

Party		Votes per municipality														Total votes	%	Seats		
Party		Älvs- byn	Arje- plog	Arvids- jaur	Boden	Gälli- vare	Hapa- randa	Jokk- mokk	Kalix	Kiruna	Luleå	Över- kalix	Över- torneå	Pajala	Piteå	Total votes	%	Con.	Lev.	Tot.
Swedish Social Democratic Party	S	2,209	651	1,681	7,831	4,219	1,514	1,035	4,542	5,744	20,740	891	926	1,295	13,957	67,235	41.64%	4	0	4
Sweden Democrats	SD	1,046	426	960	4,213	2,978	1,303	682	2,503	3,028	9,125	484	490	855	4,687	32,780	20.30%	2	0	2
Moderate Party	M	680	155	431	2,733	1,421	571	300	1,300	1,526	8,248	210	260	351	3,731	21,917	13.57%	1	0	1
Left Party	V	313	134	285	975	894	160	278	454	1,112	3,776	161	169	553	2,013	11,277	6.98%	1	0	1
Centre Party	C	338	77	226	896	303	260	134	522	392	3,096	121	302	127	1,739	8,533	5.29%	0	0	0
Christian Democrats	KD	276	151	203	834	474	217	135	462	928	2,779	119	219	306	1,163	8,266	5.12%	0	0	0
Green Party	MP	79	59	51	460	394	81	357	272	515	2,277	31	40	78	867	5,561	3.44%	0	0	0
Liberals	L	115	51	130	436	151	73	60	211	242	1,901	38	42	55	589	4,094	2.54%	0	0	0
Alternative for Sweden	AfS	20	1	10	46	33	19	14	41	34	126	4	11	16	59	434	0.27%	0	0	0
Citizens' Coalition	MED	4	1	3	23	8	9	3	11	26	103	5	6	3	29	234	0.14%	0	0	0
Christian Values Party	KrVP	8	3	5	17	9	0	7	6	62	30	4	2	17	48	218	0.14%	0	0	0
Pirate Party	PP	3	1	7	26	18	2	1	4	19	89	0	1	2	42	215	0.13%	0	0	0
Human Rights and Democracy	MoD	3	0	0	26	8	4	2	5	24	51	0	1	2	32	158	0.10%	0	0	0
The Push Buttons	Kn	5	2	3	8	11	0	2	13	6	48	3	1	1	25	128	0.08%	0	0	0
Independent Rural Party	LPo	1	4	2	10	7	3	8	4	1	23	1	0	0	29	93	0.06%	0	0	0
Feminist Initiative	FI	2	0	2	5	3	1	5	2	19	16	0	2	1	10	68	0.04%	0	0	0
Nuance Party	PNy	1	0	0	9	2	0	0	2	5	37	0	0	1	4	61	0.04%	0	0	0
Nordic Resistance Movement	NMR	1	0	0	7	0	2	1	0	2	15	1	1	1	1	32	0.02%	0	0	0
Direct Democrats	DD	0	0	1	3	1	0	0	0	2	14	0	0	1	4	26	0.02%	0	0	0
Unity	ENH	1	1	0	2	0	0	0	0	5	7	0	0	2	8	26	0.02%	0	0	0
Climate Alliance	KA	0	0	1	7	4	0	0	0	1	8	1	0	0	2	24	0.01%	0	0	0
Communist Party of Sweden	SKP	1	0	0	3	4	0	0	0	0	1	2	0	1	7	19	0.01%	0	0	0
Socialist Welfare Party	S-V	0	0	0	0	11	0	0	0	0	0	0	0	0	1	12	0.01%	0	0	0
Classical Liberal Party	KLP	3	0	0	0	0	0	0	0	1	5	0	0	1	1	11	0.01%	0	0	0
Basic Income Party	BASIP	0	0	0	0	5	0	0	1	2	0	0	0	0	0	8	0.00%	0	0	0
Turning Point Party	PV	0	0	0	1	0	0	2	0	0	2	0	0	0	0	5	0.00%	0	0	0
United Democratic Party		0	0	0	0	0	0	0	0	0	4	0	0	0	0	4	0.00%	0	0	0
Hard Line Sweden		0	0	1	0	0	1	0	0	1	0	0	0	0	0	3	0.00%	0	0	0
Scania Party	SKÅ	0	0	0	0	0	0	0	0	0	1	0	0	0	2	3	0.00%	0	0	0
Sweden Out of the EU/ Free Justice Party	FRP	1	0	0	1	1	0	0	0	0	0	0	0	0	0	3	0.00%	0	0	0
Donald Duck Party		0	0	0	0	0	0	0	0	1	0	0	0	0	1	2	0.00%	0	0	0
Common Sense in Sweden	CSIS	0	0	0	1	0	0	0	0	0	0	0	0	0	0	1	0.00%	0	0	0
Evil Chicken Party	OKP	0	0	0	1	0	0	0	0	0	0	0	0	0	0	1	0.00%	0	0	0
Freedom of the Family		0	0	0	0	0	0	0	0	0	1	0	0	0	0	1	0.00%	0	0	0
Political Shift		0	0	0	0	0	0	0	0	0	0	0	0	0	1	1	0.00%	0	0	0
The Anarchists		0	0	0	0	0	0	0	0	0	1	0	0	0	0	1	0.00%	0	0	0
Valid votes		5,110	1,717	4,002	18,574	10,959	4,220	3,026	10,355	13,698	52,524	2,076	2,473	3,669	29,052	161,455	100.00%	8	0	8
Blank votes		46	26	50	211	91	58	50	124	151	499	15	19	31	233	1,604	0.98%			
Rejected votes – unregistered parties		0	1	1	4	1	2	0	1	6	13	1	0	0	3	33	0.02%			
Rejected votes – other		6	2	1	15	5	1	2	8	19	72	0	0	4	14	149	0.09%			
Total polled		5,162	1,746	4,054	18,804	11,056	4,281	3,078	10,488	13,874	53,108	2,092	2,492	3,704	29,302	163,241	84.58%			
Registered electors		6,194	2,126	4,772	22,022	13,652	6,198	3,773	12,447	16,910	61,094	2,574	3,187	4,657	33,405	193,011				
Turnout		83.34%	82.13%	84.95%	85.39%	80.98%	69.07%	81.58%	84.26%	82.05%	86.93%	81.27%	78.19%	79.54%	87.72%	84.58%				

The following candidates were elected:

- Constituency seats (personal mandates) - Ida Karkiainen (S), 3,394 votes; and Mattias Karlsson (M), 1,464 votes.
- Constituency seats (party mandates) - Birger Lahti (V), 475 votes; Zara Leghissa (S), 712 votes; Fredrik Lundh Sammeli (S), 2,416 votes; Eric Palmqvist (SD), 359 votes; Linus Sköld (S), 345 votes; and Johnny Svedin (SD), 0 votes.

==== 2010s ====
===== 2018 =====
Results of the 2018 general election held on 9 September 2018:

Party		Votes per municipality														Total votes	%	Seats		
Party		Älvs- byn	Arje- plog	Arvids- jaur	Boden	Gälli- vare	Hapa- randa	Jokk- mokk	Kalix	Kiruna	Luleå	Över- kalix	Över- torneå	Pajala	Piteå	Total votes	%	Con.	Lev.	Tot.
Swedish Social Democratic Party	S	2,378	647	1,864	7,980	4,809	1,615	1,301	4,977	5,657	20,727	1,046	1,040	1,434	14,018	69,493	41.69%	4	0	4
Sweden Democrats	SD	882	373	686	3,393	2,341	1,077	543	2,015	2,913	7,103	411	426	627	3,486	26,276	15.76%	1	0	1
Moderate Party	M	454	163	388	2,736	1,402	563	269	1,285	1,584	8,179	175	253	359	3,489	21,299	12.78%	1	0	1
Left Party	V	570	263	441	1,547	1,474	260	471	865	1,991	5,567	235	247	762	3,117	17,810	10.69%	1	0	1
Centre Party	C	479	142	390	1,190	422	423	168	704	796	4,006	197	429	193	2,212	11,751	7.05%	1	0	1
Christian Democrats	KD	246	132	163	881	378	234	125	393	727	2,544	77	142	281	1,418	7,741	4.64%	0	0	0
Liberals	L	160	53	150	690	233	82	86	315	371	2,323	47	45	57	744	5,356	3.21%	0	0	0
Green Party	MP	65	38	39	424	283	78	229	306	418	1,897	24	35	55	713	4,604	2.76%	0	0	0
Feminist Initiative	FI	12	7	10	96	27	21	20	26	123	217	5	4	10	118	696	0.42%	0	0	0
Alternative for Sweden	AfS	21	5	10	56	19	33	5	27	45	164	9	5	8	58	465	0.28%	0	0	0
Independent Rural Party	LPo	24	15	16	9	19	1	2	24	23	84	2	0	6	14	239	0.14%	0	0	0
Citizens' Coalition	MED	2	1	7	24	12	3	0	7	24	106	3	0	2	40	231	0.14%	0	0	0
Pirate Party	PP	3	0	5	17	12	3	6	5	6	120	3	1	2	27	210	0.13%	0	0	0
Direct Democrats	DD	2	0	1	14	10	4	1	7	19	49	0	1	1	17	126	0.08%	0	0	0
Christian Values Party	KrVP	1	0	0	9	1	2	0	0	57	26	1	3	3	21	124	0.07%	0	0	0
Unity	ENH	4	0	2	12	3	1	0	7	9	18	1	0	2	15	74	0.04%	0	0	0
Nordic Resistance Movement	NMR	3	0	0	18	5	0	1	1	8	22	3	2	0	3	66	0.04%	0	0	0
Classical Liberal Party	KLP	0	0	0	4	0	1	0	0	9	10	0	0	1	2	27	0.02%	0	0	0
Animal Party	DjuP	0	0	0	4	0	1	0	0	1	10	1	0	1	0	18	0.01%	0	0	0
Communist Party of Sweden	SKP	0	0	0	0	1	0	0	1	1	1	0	0	4	8	16	0.01%	0	0	0
Basic Income Party	BASIP	0	0	3	0	2	0	0	6	3	1	0	0	0	0	15	0.01%	0	0	0
Norrland Party	NORRP	0	0	0	2	10	0	1	0	0	0	0	0	0	2	15	0.01%	0	0	0
Our Country – Sweden	VL-S	0	0	0	0	1	0	0	0	8	0	0	0	0	0	9	0.01%	0	0	0
Initiative	INI	0	0	0	0	0	0	0	0	0	4	0	0	0	0	4	0.00%	0	0	0
Common Sense in Sweden	CSIS	0	0	0	1	0	0	0	0	0	0	0	0	0	0	1	0.00%	0	0	0
Parties not on the ballot	ÖVR	0	0	0	3	0	0	0	0	3	4	1	0	0	1	12	0.01%	0	0	0
Valid votes		5,306	1,839	4,175	19,110	11,464	4,402	3,228	10,971	14,796	53,182	2,241	2,633	3,808	29,523	166,678	100.00%	8	0	8
Blank votes		34	23	62	163	110	45	34	129	164	369	29	18	30	180	1,390	0.83%			
Rejected votes – unregistered parties		1	1	3	5	7	2	1	7	24	14	0	0	0	9	74	0.04%			
Rejected votes – other		5	2	0	13	6	5	0	4	7	24	0	1	4	7	78	0.05%			
Total polled		5,346	1,865	4,240	19,291	11,587	4,454	3,263	11,111	14,991	53,589	2,270	2,652	3,842	29,719	168,220	86.86%			
Registered electors		6,257	2,219	4,963	21,934	14,081	6,120	3,913	12,765	17,468	60,185	2,667	3,273	4,720	33,094	193,659				
Turnout		85.44%	84.05%	85.43%	87.95%	82.29%	72.78%	83.39%	87.04%	85.82%	89.04%	85.11%	81.03%	81.40%	89.80%	86.86%				

The following candidates were elected:

- Constituency seats (personal mandates) - Sven-Erik Bucht (S), 5,458 votes; Mattias Karlsson (M), 1,598 votes; and Linda Ylivainio (C), 973 votes.
- Constituency seats (party mandates) - Ida Karkiainen (S), 1,823 votes; Birger Lahti (V), 682 votes; Fredrik Lundh Sammeli (S), 1,058 votes; Eric Palmqvist (SD), 311 votes; and Emilia Töyrä (S), 1,427 votes.

Permanent substitutions:

- Sven-Erik Bucht (S) resigned on 30 January 2019 and was replaced by Linus Sköld (S) on the same day.

===== 2014 =====
Results of the 2014 general election held on 14 September 2014:

Party		Votes per municipality														Total votes	%	Seats		
Party		Älvs- byn	Arje- plog	Arvids- jaur	Boden	Gälli- vare	Hapa- randa	Jokk- mokk	Kalix	Kiruna	Luleå	Över- kalix	Över- torneå	Pajala	Piteå	Total votes	%	Con.	Lev.	Tot.
Swedish Social Democratic Party	S	2,895	818	2,255	8,779	6,117	2,175	1,597	6,113	7,090	23,092	1,250	1,289	1,859	15,655	80,984	48.73%	5	0	5
Moderate Party	M	441	182	439	2,903	1,311	573	299	1,267	1,540	8,226	194	291	383	3,389	21,438	12.90%	1	0	1
Sweden Democrats	SD	692	273	565	2,770	1,843	582	421	1,262	1,976	4,567	310	301	457	2,218	18,237	10.97%	1	0	1
Left Party	V	500	222	440	1,254	1,407	209	320	692	1,738	3,856	250	275	722	2,340	14,225	8.56%	1	0	1
Green Party	MP	117	64	71	688	503	126	312	449	779	3,431	52	76	92	1,351	8,111	4.88%	0	0	0
Centre Party	C	330	127	270	694	213	363	80	520	441	2,380	211	302	133	1,449	7,513	4.52%	0	0	0
Liberal People's Party	FP	144	61	133	769	174	76	105	268	339	2,281	42	59	63	855	5,369	3.23%	0	0	0
Christian Democrats	KD	171	64	77	537	273	118	44	231	508	1,664	27	98	212	1,024	5,048	3.04%	0	0	0
Feminist Initiative	FI	83	31	50	374	197	69	95	144	413	1,568	35	31	80	774	3,944	2.37%	0	0	0
Pirate Party	PP	22	1	18	43	39	19	16	18	48	303	3	4	10	101	645	0.39%	0	0	0
Independent Rural Party	LBPo	6	4	3	26	7	1	1	2	15	104	0	1	0	4	174	0.10%	0	0	0
Christian Values Party	KrVP	1	0	0	8	6	6	0	1	29	36	0	1	6	3	97	0.06%	0	0	0
Party of the Swedes	SVP	9	1	4	10	7	3	1	3	10	17	6	1	0	4	76	0.05%	0	0	0
Unity	ENH	2	1	0	5	2	3	1	1	10	27	0	0	2	11	65	0.04%	0	0	0
Socialist Justice Party	RS	0	0	0	4	1	0	0	2	0	52	0	0	0	2	61	0.04%	0	0	0
Direct Democrats		1	1	0	9	2	0	1	3	4	31	0	2	1	2	57	0.03%	0	0	0
Animal Party	DjuP	0	0	0	3	3	0	0	0	10	12	0	0	1	2	31	0.02%	0	0	0
Classical Liberal Party	KLP	0	0	0	1	0	0	0	0	2	8	0	1	0	4	16	0.01%	0	0	0
Communist Party of Sweden	SKP	0	0	0	1	1	0	0	1	1	1	0	0	2	7	14	0.01%	0	0	0
Sweden Out of the EU/Free Justice Party	FRP	0	0	0	0	0	0	0	0	5	0	0	0	0	0	5	0.00%	0	0	0
Health Party		1	0	0	4	0	0	0	0	0	0	0	0	0	0	5	0.00%	0	0	0
Swedish Senior Citizen Interest Party	SPI	0	0	0	1	0	0	0	0	0	1	0	0	0	0	2	0.00%	0	0	0
Republicans		0	0	0	0	0	0	0	0	0	0	0	0	1	0	1	0.00%	0	0	0
Parties not on the ballot		1	1	1	7	2	0	3	2	6	25	2	1	0	8	59	0.04%	0	0	0
Valid votes		5,416	1,851	4,326	18,890	12,108	4,323	3,296	10,979	14,964	51,682	2,382	2,733	4,024	29,203	166,177	100.00%	8	0	8
Blank votes		30	30	40	129	82	22	24	94	153	338	18	16	32	201	1,209	0.72%			
Rejected votes		0	1	2	9	3	3	1	0	4	26	2	0	0	9	60	0.04%			
Total polled		5,446	1,882	4,368	19,028	12,193	4,348	3,321	11,073	15,121	52,046	2,402	2,749	4,056	29,413	167,446	85.59%			
Registered electors		6,412	2,344	5,138	21,995	14,828	6,177	4,064	12,984	17,933	59,392	2,812	3,416	5,016	33,137	195,648				
Turnout		84.93%	80.29%	85.01%	86.51%	82.23%	70.39%	81.72%	85.28%	84.32%	87.63%	85.42%	80.47%	80.86%	88.76%	85.59%				

The following candidates were elected:

- Constituency seats (personal mandates) - Sven-Erik Bucht (S), 10,550 votes; and Krister Hammarbergh (M), 1,443 votes.
- Constituency seats (party mandates) - Hannah Bergstedt (S), 2,174 votes; Birger Lahti (V), 525 votes; Fredrik Lundh Sammeli (S), 1,471 votes; Leif Pettersson (S), 408 votes; Emilia Töyrä (S), 1,895 votes; and Hanna Wigh (SD), 9 votes.

===== 2010 =====
Results of the 2010 general election held on 19 September 2010:

Party		Votes per municipality														Total votes	%	Seats		
Party		Älvs- byn	Arje- plog	Arvids- jaur	Boden	Gälli- vare	Hapa- randa	Jokk- mokk	Kalix	Kiruna	Luleå	Över- kalix	Över- torneå	Pajala	Piteå	Total votes	%	Con.	Lev.	Tot.
Swedish Social Democratic Party	S	3,073	922	2,383	9,255	6,702	2,655	1,764	6,583	7,520	22,972	1,516	1,462	2,085	16,143	85,035	51.86%	6	0	6
Moderate Party	M	608	286	589	3,880	1,705	755	455	1,563	1,922	10,036	201	378	512	3,962	26,852	16.38%	2	0	2
Left Party	V	659	230	491	1,476	1,629	191	348	713	2,031	3,856	268	293	766	2,289	15,240	9.29%	1	0	1
Green Party	MP	154	90	115	783	459	103	259	590	759	3,584	60	72	85	1,517	8,630	5.26%	0	0	0
Centre Party	C	347	114	319	677	205	322	128	545	374	2,500	227	318	132	1,410	7,618	4.65%	0	0	0
Liberal People's Party	FP	223	117	182	876	272	66	169	413	468	2,863	75	78	86	1,194	7,082	4.32%	0	0	0
Sweden Democrats	SD	292	97	197	846	599	165	123	394	827	1,742	91	94	157	685	6,309	3.85%	0	0	0
Christian Democrats	KD	196	96	88	597	284	115	65	240	469	1,749	35	95	225	1,134	5,388	3.29%	0	0	0
Pirate Party	PP	48	15	40	107	97	16	26	35	88	409	3	5	9	167	1,065	0.65%	0	0	0
Feminist Initiative	FI	8	3	2	41	19	5	9	9	45	150	3	2	1	68	365	0.22%	0	0	0
Socialist Justice Party	RS	5	0	0	11	5	0	1	5	11	137	6	1	0	12	194	0.12%	0	0	0
Norrland Coalition Party	NorrS	4	1	1	4	5	0	1	2	4	9	0	0	0	0	31	0.02%	0	0	0
Communist Party of Sweden	SKP	1	0	0	3	0	0	0	2	0	2	0	0	4	9	21	0.01%	0	0	0
Rural Democrats		2	0	3	1	3	0	0	0	5	1	0	2	0	0	17	0.01%	0	0	0
Swedish Senior Citizen Interest Party	SPI	0	1	0	2	0	0	0	4	0	5	0	0	0	0	12	0.01%	0	0	0
Unity	ENH	0	0	0	0	7	0	1	0	1	3	0	0	0	0	12	0.01%	0	0	0
National Democrats	ND	2	0	0	0	1	0	0	1	0	3	1	0	0	1	9	0.01%	0	0	0
Party of the Swedes	SVP	0	0	0	0	4	0	0	0	0	5	0	0	0	0	9	0.01%	0	0	0
Freedom Party		0	0	0	0	0	1	0	1	1	1	0	0	3	0	7	0.00%	0	0	0
Classical Liberal Party	KLP	0	0	0	1	0	0	0	0	2	2	0	0	0	0	5	0.00%	0	0	0
Spirits Party		0	0	0	0	0	0	0	0	2	0	0	0	0	3	5	0.00%	0	0	0
Health Care Party	Sjvåp	0	0	0	0	0	0	0	0	1	1	0	0	0	2	4	0.00%	0	0	0
Active Democracy		0	0	0	0	0	0	0	0	0	1	0	0	0	0	1	0.00%	0	0	0
Communist League	KommF	0	0	0	0	0	0	0	0	0	1	0	0	0	0	1	0.00%	0	0	0
European Workers Party	EAP	0	0	0	0	0	0	0	0	0	1	0	0	0	0	1	0.00%	0	0	0
Parties not on the ballot		1	1	1	13	4	0	2	2	5	17	1	1	0	2	50	0.03%	0	0	0
Valid votes		5,623	1,973	4,411	18,573	12,000	4,394	3,351	11,102	14,535	50,050	2,487	2,801	4,065	28,598	163,963	100.00%	9	0	9
Blank votes		37	29	41	151	70	33	37	103	140	416	12	22	31	232	1,354	0.82%			
Rejected votes		1	1	2	6	8	4	3	3	8	29	0	1	4	16	86	0.05%			
Total polled		5,661	2,003	4,454	18,730	12,078	4,431	3,391	11,208	14,683	50,495	2,499	2,824	4,100	28,846	165,403	84.91%			
Registered electors		6,639	2,523	5,296	21,748	14,980	6,237	4,183	13,273	17,847	57,939	3,001	3,496	5,029	32,597	194,788				
Turnout		85.27%	79.39%	84.10%	86.12%	80.63%	71.04%	81.07%	84.44%	82.27%	87.15%	83.27%	80.78%	81.53%	88.49%	84.91%				

The following candidates were elected:

- Constituency seats (personal mandates) - Sven-Erik Bucht (S), 17,674 votes; and Krister Hammarbergh (M), 3,159 votes.
- Constituency seats (party mandates) - Åsa Ågren Wikström (M), 946 votes; Karin Åström (S), 2,648 votes; Hannah Bergstedt (S), 2,763 votes; Siv Holma (V), 967 votes; Fredrik Lundh Sammeli (S), 1,754 votes; Leif Pettersson (S), 877 votes; and Maria Stenberg (S), 1,041 votes.

Permanent substitutions:

- Åsa Ågren Wikström (M) resigned on 6 March 2011 and was replaced by Johan Johansson (M) on 7 March 2011.

==== 2000s ====
===== 2006 =====
Results of the 2006 general election held on 17 September 2006:

Party		Votes per municipality														Total votes	%	Seats		
Party		Älvs- byn	Arje- plog	Arvids- jaur	Boden	Gälli- vare	Hapa- randa	Jokk- mokk	Kalix	Kiruna	Luleå	Över- kalix	Över- torneå	Pajala	Piteå	Total votes	%	Con.	Lev.	Tot.
Swedish Social Democratic Party	S	3,105	879	2,550	8,723	6,034	2,134	1,636	6,547	7,127	21,982	1,427	1,222	1,859	15,380	80,605	51.48%	6	0	6
Moderate Party	M	425	210	465	3,201	1,361	714	371	1,123	1,308	7,959	173	354	406	2,856	20,926	13.36%	1	0	1
Left Party	V	617	283	553	1,576	2,037	261	505	766	2,069	3,964	307	327	924	2,305	16,494	10.53%	1	0	1
Centre Party	C	470	202	334	979	298	509	190	766	450	3,065	279	416	193	1,914	10,065	6.43%	1	0	1
Liberal People's Party	FP	168	119	172	756	269	94	200	365	433	2,802	62	88	91	1,095	6,714	4.29%	0	0	0
Christian Democrats	KD	256	93	95	835	323	152	79	363	536	2,069	64	127	226	1,371	6,589	4.21%	0	0	0
Green Party	MP	114	62	76	517	329	88	223	509	511	2,682	51	75	85	1,028	6,350	4.06%	0	0	0
Health Care Party	Sjvåp	140	34	71	529	254	74	71	84	547	348	20	117	168	421	2,878	1.84%	0	0	0
Sweden Democrats	SD	85	34	46	326	268	57	35	189	334	607	19	28	55	219	2,302	1.47%	0	0	0
Pirate Party	PP	42	11	20	128	89	30	40	62	101	445	10	10	6	154	1,148	0.73%	0	0	0
Feminist Initiative	FI	22	8	15	101	61	16	27	63	158	379	9	6	21	206	1,092	0.70%	0	0	0
June List		31	11	28	110	79	22	35	72	104	235	16	15	10	130	898	0.57%	0	0	0
Socialist Justice Party	RS	0	0	1	20	0	0	1	0	17	159	0	0	0	44	242	0.15%	0	0	0
Swedish Senior Citizen Interest Party	SPI	3	2	4	12	6	3	4	11	5	15	1	0	1	14	81	0.05%	0	0	0
New Future		0	7	4	4	1	0	0	0	37	14	0	0	2	2	71	0.05%	0	0	0
Unity	ENH	1	0	0	7	0	0	3	0	1	12	0	0	0	3	27	0.02%	0	0	0
National Socialist Front		0	0	0	2	0	0	0	2	15	5	1	0	0	1	26	0.02%	0	0	0
National Democrats	ND	1	0	0	2	5	0	0	0	1	4	0	0	0	0	13	0.01%	0	0	0
The Communists	KOMM	0	0	0	0	1	0	1	2	1	0	0	0	1	1	7	0.00%	0	0	0
Unique Party		0	0	0	1	2	0	0	0	0	2	1	0	0	0	6	0.00%	0	0	0
People's Will		0	0	3	1	0	0	0	0	0	0	0	0	0	1	5	0.00%	0	0	0
Classical Liberal Party	KLP	0	0	0	0	0	0	0	0	0	2	0	0	1	0	3	0.00%	0	0	0
Kvinnokraft		0	0	0	0	1	0	0	0	1	0	0	0	0	0	2	0.00%	0	0	0
Nordic Union		0	0	0	0	0	0	0	0	1	0	0	0	0	0	1	0.00%	0	0	0
Parties not on the ballot		0	0	1	1	2	0	4	0	5	18	0	0	0	0	31	0.02%	0	0	0
Valid votes		5,480	1,955	4,438	17,831	11,420	4,154	3,425	10,924	13,762	46,768	2,440	2,785	4,049	27,145	156,576	100.00%	9	0	9
Blank votes		66	34	62	224	116	52	52	155	171	564	20	35	50	326	1,927	1.22%			
Rejected votes		2	0	1	8	4	1	3	0	9	13	1	1	1	17	61	0.04%			
Total polled		5,548	1,989	4,501	18,063	11,540	4,207	3,480	11,079	13,942	47,345	2,461	2,821	4,100	27,488	158,564	81.82%			
Registered electors		6,765	2,539	5,496	21,774	15,004	6,132	4,388	13,508	17,704	56,252	3,136	3,765	5,319	32,014	193,796				
Turnout		82.01%	78.34%	81.90%	82.96%	76.91%	68.61%	79.31%	82.02%	78.75%	84.17%	78.48%	74.93%	77.08%	85.86%	81.82%				

The following candidates were elected:

- Constituency seats (personal mandates) - Krister Hammarbergh (M), 2,511 votes; and Stefan Tornberg (C), 1,279 votes.
- Constituency seats (party mandates) - Karin Åström (S), 1,068 votes; Lars U. Granberg (S), 1,385 votes; Siv Holma (V), 938 votes; Fredrik Lundh (S), 2,265 votes; Maria Öberg (S), 1,186 votes; Leif Pettersson (S), 1,084 votes; and Kristina Zakrisson (S), 5,341 votes.

===== 2002 =====
Results of the 2002 general election held on 15 September 2002:

Party		Votes per municipality														Total votes	%	Seats		
Party		Älvs- byn	Arje- plog	Arvids- jaur	Boden	Gälli- vare	Hapa- randa	Jokk- mokk	Kalix	Kiruna	Luleå	Över- kalix	Över- torneå	Pajala	Piteå	Total votes	%	Con.	Lev.	Tot.
Swedish Social Democratic Party	S	3,014	907	2,385	8,439	4,814	1,829	1,606	5,941	5,613	21,034	1,404	1,079	1,560	14,685	74,310	47.95%	6	0	6
Left Party	V	841	294	642	2,072	1,907	401	479	1,127	2,034	5,204	342	376	857	3,136	19,712	12.72%	1	0	1
Norrbotten Party	NBP	363	204	291	1,734	2,112	372	556	626	3,234	1,800	263	591	952	1,151	14,249	9.19%	0	0	0
Moderate Party	M	223	77	224	1,777	805	469	145	710	613	4,417	93	186	220	1,248	11,207	7.23%	1	0	1
Liberal People's Party	FP	222	108	239	1,215	457	161	193	549	575	4,391	84	77	98	1,640	10,009	6.46%	1	0	1
Christian Democrats	KD	349	112	191	936	395	224	132	444	529	2,616	91	180	347	1,693	8,239	5.32%	0	1	1
Green Party	MP	134	90	83	893	560	170	308	978	721	2,791	86	90	111	1,058	8,073	5.21%	0	1	1
Centre Party	C	424	184	331	701	214	439	115	687	263	2,154	244	345	186	1,618	7,905	5.10%	0	0	0
Sweden Democrats	SD	9	0	2	39	87	9	1	20	75	79	4	3	1	95	424	0.27%	0	0	0
The Communists	KOMM	7	1	12	1	117	0	0	21	7	13	1	0	54	78	312	0.20%	0	0	0
Socialist Justice Party	RS	10	0	4	9	1	1	0	7	2	154	0	0	2	17	207	0.13%	0	0	0
New Future	NYF	7	2	18	1	1	0	2	1	22	26	1	0	1	2	84	0.05%	0	0	0
Swedish Senior Citizen Interest Party	SPI	1	1	0	13	4	4	2	9	3	25	1	0	1	7	71	0.05%	0	0	0
Socialist Party	SOC.P	0	0	0	2	3	0	0	0	4	3	0	0	0	0	12	0.01%	0	0	0
Unity	ENH	0	0	0	0	0	0	0	0	0	2	0	0	0	1	3	0.00%	0	0	0
Other parties		14	1	3	18	7	0	5	6	14	61	2	2	2	26	161	0.10%	0	0	0
Valid votes		5,618	1,981	4,425	17,850	11,484	4,079	3,544	11,126	13,709	44,770	2,616	2,929	4,392	26,455	154,978	100.00%	9	2	11
Rejected votes		49	15	36	167	77	42	42	90	115	447	28	11	20	214	1,353	0.87%			
Total polled		5,667	1,996	4,461	18,017	11,561	4,121	3,586	11,216	13,824	45,217	2,644	2,940	4,412	26,669	156,331	80.73%			
Registered electors		6,855	2,591	5,633	21,929	15,305	6,135	4,551	13,634	17,823	54,944	3,275	3,935	5,641	31,402	193,653				
Turnout		82.67%	77.04%	79.19%	82.16%	75.54%	67.17%	78.80%	82.26%	77.56%	82.30%	80.73%	74.71%	78.21%	84.93%	80.73%				

The following candidates were elected:

- Constituency seats (personal mandates) - Anna Grönlund (FP), 1,970 votes; Anna Ibrisagic (M), 1,969 votes; Björn Rosengren (S), 8,401 votes; and Anders Sundström (S), 9,483 votes.
- Constituency seats (party mandates) - Birgitta Ahlqvist (S), 869 votes; Siv Holma (V), 1,245 votes; Lennart Klockare (S), 399 votes; Maria Öberg (S), 985 votes; and Kristina Zakrisson (S), 1,369 votes.
- Levelling seats (personal mandates) - Peter Eriksson (MP), 2,374 votes; and Erling Wälivaara (KD), 750 votes.

Permanent substitutions:

- Björn Rosengren (S) resigned on 21 October 2002 and was replaced by Lars U. Granberg (S) on 22 October 2002.
- Anna Ibrisagic (M) resigned on 19 July 2004 and was replaced by Krister Hammarbergh (M) on 20 July 2004.
- Anders Sundström (S) resigned on 31 July 2004 and was replaced by Karin Åström (S) on 1 August 2004.

==== 1990s ====
===== 1998 =====
Results of the 1998 general election held on 20 September 1998:

Party		Votes per municipality														Total votes	%	Seats		
Party		Älvs- byn	Arje- plog	Arvids- jaur	Boden	Gälli- vare	Hapa- randa	Jokk- mokk	Kalix	Kiruna	Luleå	Över- kalix	Över- torneå	Pajala	Piteå	Total votes	%	Con.	Lev.	Tot.
Swedish Social Democratic Party	S	2,876	957	2,363	8,707	5,408	1,959	1,808	6,059	7,161	19,631	1,475	1,331	2,042	14,165	75,942	47.38%	5	0	5
Left Party	V	1,604	533	1,184	3,761	4,196	732	1,089	2,069	3,964	8,470	582	737	1,450	5,176	35,547	22.18%	2	0	2
Moderate Party	M	407	162	405	2,671	1,320	687	357	1,180	1,555	6,924	202	428	455	2,161	18,914	11.80%	1	0	1
Christian Democrats	KD	422	165	265	1,407	577	268	226	570	744	3,165	107	278	368	1,845	10,407	6.49%	1	0	1
Centre Party	C	327	131	260	670	214	402	88	664	181	1,815	258	391	211	1,385	6,997	4.37%	0	0	0
Green Party	MP	105	84	130	603	406	82	180	486	407	1,939	69	91	100	695	5,377	3.35%	0	0	0
Liberal People's Party	FP	113	59	152	557	233	74	123	316	327	1,919	62	47	75	723	4,780	2.98%	0	0	0
Other parties		49	75	48	330	153	126	35	115	227	522	20	54	115	444	2,313	1.44%	0	0	0
Valid votes		5,903	2,166	4,807	18,706	12,507	4,330	3,906	11,459	14,566	44,385	2,775	3,357	4,816	26,594	160,277	100.00%	9	0	9
Rejected votes		66	31	45	255	121	48	65	146	195	613	31	21	55	369	2,061	1.27%			
Total polled		5,969	2,197	4,852	18,961	12,628	4,378	3,971	11,605	14,761	44,998	2,806	3,378	4,871	26,963	162,338	81.98%			
Registered electors		7,048	2,780	5,920	22,558	16,388	6,397	4,898	14,082	18,820	54,157	3,480	4,198	6,047	31,254	198,027				
Turnout		84.69%	79.03%	81.96%	84.05%	77.06%	68.44%	81.07%	82.41%	78.43%	83.09%	80.63%	80.47%	80.55%	86.27%	81.98%				

The following candidates were elected:

- Constituency seats (personal mandates) - Olle Lindström (M), 2,222 votes; and Anders Sundström (S), 7,366 votes.
- Constituency seats (party mandates) - Birgitta Ahlqvist (S), 2,627 votes; Stig Eriksson (V), 1,958 votes; Lars U. Granberg (S), 422 votes; Siv Holma (V), 1,802 votes; Lennart Klockare (S), 1,309 votes; Monica Öhman (S), 1,206 votes; and Erling Wälivaara (KD), 798 votes.

Permanent substitutions:

- Anders Sundström (S) resigned on 26 October 1998 and was replaced by Kristina Zakrisson (S) on 27 October 1998.
- Monica Öhman (S) resigned on 14 June 2002 and was replaced by Bengt Niska (S) on 15 June 2002.

===== 1994 =====
Results of the 1994 general election held on 18 September 1994:

Party		Votes per municipality														Total votes	%	Seats		
Party		Älvs- byn	Arje- plog	Arvids- jaur	Boden	Gälli- vare	Hapa- randa	Jokk- mokk	Kalix	Kiruna	Luleå	Över- kalix	Över- torneå	Pajala	Piteå	Total votes	%	Con.	Lev.	Tot.
Swedish Social Democratic Party	S	4,098	1,332	3,340	12,169	8,566	3,031	2,711	8,430	9,550	26,767	2,058	1,910	2,911	18,563	105,436	60.58%	8	0	8
Left Party	V	817	328	652	1,871	2,480	347	486	1,093	3,135	4,480	373	442	1,093	2,271	19,868	11.42%	1	0	1
Moderate Party	M	389	206	474	2,782	1,400	653	334	1,092	1,501	6,126	160	352	442	2,097	18,008	10.35%	1	0	1
Centre Party	C	412	198	353	1,089	360	571	140	873	333	2,211	354	588	331	1,634	9,447	5.43%	0	1	1
Liberal People's Party	FP	209	92	212	910	425	168	170	504	580	3,344	97	88	183	1,213	8,195	4.71%	0	0	0
Green Party	MP	200	119	149	748	465	132	255	361	584	2,049	59	70	115	859	6,165	3.54%	0	0	0
Christian Democratic Unity	KDS	217	68	147	575	233	117	62	208	320	1,313	28	102	177	924	4,491	2.58%	0	0	0
New Democracy	NyD	23	4	14	78	63	22	18	49	74	159	12	10	15	61	602	0.35%	0	0	0
Other parties		64	34	49	169	221	71	59	111	222	349	25	66	127	266	1,833	1.05%	0	0	0
Valid votes		6,429	2,381	5,390	20,391	14,213	5,112	4,235	12,721	16,299	46,798	3,166	3,628	5,394	27,888	174,045	100.00%	10	1	11
Rejected votes		27	27	47	207	74	14	36	93	137	378	24	13	29	217	1,323	0.75%			
Total polled		6,456	2,408	5,437	20,598	14,287	5,126	4,271	12,814	16,436	47,176	3,190	3,641	5,423	28,105	175,368	87.37%			
Registered electors		7,242	2,882	6,249	23,107	17,136	6,458	5,054	14,463	19,443	53,315	3,703	4,319	6,393	30,966	200,730				
Turnout		89.15%	83.55%	87.01%	89.14%	83.37%	79.37%	84.51%	88.60%	84.53%	88.49%	86.15%	84.30%	84.83%	90.76%	87.37%				

The following candidates were elected: Birgitta Ahlqvist (S); Per-Ola Eriksson (C); Lars U. Granberg (S); Birgitta Gidblom (S); Bengt Hurtig (V); Ulf Kero (S); Lennart Klockare (S); Olle Lindström (M); Leif Marklund (M); Monica Öhman (S); and Kristina Zakrisson (S).

Permanent substitutions:

- Birgitta Ahlqvist (S) resigned on 8 October 1995 and was replaced by Eva Persson Sellin (S) on 9 October 1995.

===== 1991 =====
Results of the 1991 general election held on 15 September 1991:

Party		Votes per municipality														Total votes	%	Seats		
Party		Älvs- byn	Arje- plog	Arvids- jaur	Boden	Gälli- vare	Hapa- randa	Jokk- mokk	Kalix	Kiruna	Luleå	Över- kalix	Över- torneå	Pajala	Piteå	Total votes	%	Con.	Lev.	Tot.
Swedish Social Democratic Party	S	3,696	1,166	2,979	10,728	7,499	2,522	2,281	7,717	8,952	22,875	1,919	1,658	2,603	16,287	92,882	55.48%	6	0	6
Moderate Party	M	383	234	478	2,764	1,491	706	508	1,088	1,521	6,167	186	376	420	2,055	18,377	10.98%	1	0	1
Left Party	V	641	262	515	1,337	2,113	242	447	771	2,169	3,481	312	357	967	1,552	15,166	9.06%	1	0	1
Centre Party	C	567	282	494	1,315	546	771	189	1,071	452	2,769	393	699	436	2,255	12,239	7.31%	1	0	1
Liberal People's Party	FP	323	134	337	1,415	678	200	325	737	890	4,364	139	142	231	1,666	11,581	6.92%	1	0	1
Christian Democratic Unity	KDS	368	130	274	973	431	164	156	411	535	2,130	66	157	248	1,621	7,664	4.58%	0	0	0
New Democracy	NyD	195	121	161	600	322	108	150	257	426	1,332	47	101	146	685	4,651	2.78%	0	0	0
Green Party	MP	112	52	60	457	293	90	151	267	299	1,494	31	44	68	524	3,942	2.35%	0	0	0
Other parties		10	2	33	29	137	29	7	56	129	155	18	2	73	242	922	0.55%	0	0	0
Valid votes		6,295	2,383	5,331	19,618	13,510	4,832	4,214	12,375	15,373	44,767	3,111	3,536	5,192	26,887	167,424	100.00%	10	0	10
Rejected votes		34	38	78	172	150	45	70	135	133	576	33	11	60	319	1,854	1.10%			
Total polled		6,329	2,421	5,409	19,790	13,660	4,877	4,284	12,510	15,506	45,343	3,144	3,547	5,252	27,206	169,278	85.26%			
Registered electors		7,185	2,930	6,361	22,710	17,252	6,281	5,224	14,487	19,357	52,069	3,724	4,271	6,423	30,259	198,533				
Turnout		88.09%	82.63%	85.03%	87.14%	79.18%	77.65%	82.01%	86.35%	80.11%	87.08%	84.43%	83.05%	81.77%	89.91%	85.26%				

The following candidates were elected: Britta Bjelle (FP); Per-Ola Eriksson (C); Ewa Hedkvist Petersen (S); Bengt Hurtig (V); Olle Lindström (M); Leif Marklund (M); Monica Öhman (S); Bruno Poromaa (S); Åke Selberg (S); and Sten-Ove Sundström (S).

==== 1980s ====
===== 1988 =====
Results of the 1988 general election held on 18 September 1988:

Party		Votes per municipality														Total votes	%	Seats		
Party		Älvs- byn	Arje- plog	Arvids- jaur	Boden	Gälli- vare	Hapa- randa	Jokk- mokk	Kalix	Kiruna	Luleå	Över- kalix	Över- torneå	Pajala	Piteå	Total votes	%	Con.	Lev.	Tot.
Swedish Social Democratic Party	S	3,890	1,198	3,239	11,072	8,019	2,687	2,486	7,986	9,288	23,768	2,008	1,758	2,727	16,461	96,587	58.10%	6	0	6
Left Party – Communists	VPK	656	407	632	1,470	2,361	294	449	780	2,485	4,116	302	396	982	1,705	17,035	10.25%	1	0	1
Centre Party	C	700	310	476	1,470	692	756	221	1,221	568	3,510	446	731	517	2,669	14,287	8.59%	1	0	1
Moderate Party	M	293	132	330	2,094	1,277	641	310	866	1,112	4,561	140	333	431	1,562	14,082	8.47%	1	0	1
Liberal People's Party	FP	329	198	411	1,683	736	206	381	756	972	4,530	113	185	279	1,673	12,452	7.49%	1	0	1
Green Party	MP	169	122	171	636	512	160	252	417	438	2,063	79	77	110	796	6,002	3.61%	0	0	0
Christian Democratic Unity	KDS	231	69	163	551	190	101	75	187	260	913	17	90	156	1,044	4,047	2.43%	0	0	0
Other parties		47	13	36	136	278	58	18	158	185	471	37	47	139	128	1,751	1.05%	0	0	0
Valid votes		6,315	2,449	5,458	19,112	14,065	4,903	4,192	12,371	15,308	43,932	3,142	3,617	5,341	26,038	166,243	100.00%	10	0	10
Rejected votes		30	19	41	111	81	28	33	71	107	306	22	21	31	175	1,076	0.64%			
Total polled		6,345	2,468	5,499	19,223	14,146	4,931	4,225	12,442	15,415	44,238	3,164	3,638	5,372	26,213	167,319	85.06%			
Registered electors		7,199	2,996	6,404	22,200	17,765	6,136	5,358	14,339	19,478	50,966	3,751	4,341	6,562	29,202	196,697				
Turnout		88.14%	82.38%	85.87%	86.59%	79.63%	80.36%	78.85%	86.77%	79.14%	86.80%	84.35%	83.81%	81.87%	89.76%	85.06%				

The following candidates were elected: Britta Bjelle (FP); Per-Ola Eriksson (C); Ewa Hedkvist Petersen (S); Erik Holmkvist (M); Paul Lestander (VPK); Leif Marklund (M); Monica Öhman (S); Bruno Poromaa (S); Åke Selberg (S); and Sten-Ove Sundström (S).

Permanent substitutions:

- Paul Lestander (VPK) resigned on 30 September 1989 and was replaced by Bengt Hurtig (VPK) on the same day.

===== 1985 =====
Results of the 1985 general election held on 15 September 1985:

Party		Votes per municipality														Total votes	%	Seats		
Party		Älvs- byn	Arje- plog	Arvids- jaur	Boden	Gälli- vare	Hapa- randa	Jokk- mokk	Kalix	Kiruna	Luleå	Över- kalix	Över- torneå	Pajala	Piteå	Total votes	%	Con.	Lev.	Tot.
Swedish Social Democratic Party	S	4,078	1,310	3,508	11,829	8,746	2,796	2,755	8,598	10,105	24,887	2,239	1,968	3,067	16,806	102,692	58.96%	6	1	7
Moderate Party	M	408	245	467	2,654	1,831	848	483	1,185	1,493	5,962	204	407	600	2,201	18,988	10.90%	1	0	1
Left Party – Communists	VPK	659	421	633	1,502	2,790	305	426	750	2,696	4,194	336	468	1,136	1,707	18,023	10.35%	1	0	1
Centre Party	C	865	373	693	1,961	876	911	287	1,461	799	4,061	453	913	670	3,627	17,950	10.31%	1	0	1
Liberal People's Party	FP	429	236	489	1,867	925	232	401	865	1,146	4,855	177	180	286	1,938	14,026	8.05%	1	0	1
Green Party	MP	49	22	27	121	94	56	101	102	121	487	18	12	22	201	1,433	0.82%	0	0	0
Other parties		48	6	19	40	181	15	7	21	237	387	4	2	10	82	1,059	0.61%	0	0	0
Valid votes		6,536	2,613	5,836	19,974	15,443	5,163	4,460	12,982	16,597	44,833	3,431	3,950	5,791	26,562	174,171	100.00%	10	1	11
Rejected votes		31	17	44	79	97	19	28	60	72	255	12	18	35	159	926	0.53%			
Total polled		6,567	2,630	5,880	20,053	15,540	5,182	4,488	13,042	16,669	45,088	3,443	3,968	5,826	26,721	175,097	89.05%			
Registered electors		7,205	3,133	6,524	22,203	18,189	6,085	5,432	14,427	19,640	49,838	3,910	4,507	6,666	28,863	196,622				
Turnout		91.15%	83.95%	90.13%	90.32%	85.44%	85.16%	82.62%	90.40%	84.87%	90.47%	88.06%	88.04%	87.40%	92.58%	89.05%				

The following candidates were elected: Britta Bjelle (FP); Per-Ola Eriksson (C); Ewa Hedkvist Petersen (S); Erik Holmkvist (M); Paul Lestander (VPK); Leif Marklund (M); Monica Öhman (S); Bruno Poromaa (S); Åke Selberg (S); Åsa Strömbäck-Norrman (S); and Sten-Ove Sundström (S).

Permanent substitutions:

- Åsa Strömbäck-Norrman (S) resigned on 28 February 1987 and was replaced by Claes Rensfeldt (S) on 1 March 1987.

===== 1982 =====
Results of the 1982 general election held on 19 September 1982:

Party		Votes per municipality														Total votes	%	Seats		
Party		Älvs- byn	Arje- plog	Arvids- jaur	Boden	Gälli- vare	Hapa- randa	Jokk- mokk	Kalix	Kiruna	Luleå	Över- kalix	Över- torneå	Pajala	Piteå	Total votes	%	Con.	Lev.	Tot.
Swedish Social Democratic Party	S	3,945	1,363	3,512	11,706	9,290	2,737	2,824	8,535	11,059	24,420	2,232	2,032	2,940	16,411	103,006	58.81%	7	0	7
Moderate Party	M	480	269	480	2,842	1,988	809	546	1,275	1,763	6,551	190	396	595	2,454	20,638	11.78%	1	0	1
Centre Party	C	845	413	765	2,288	1,159	962	397	1,704	945	5,010	599	955	697	3,571	20,310	11.60%	1	0	1
Left Party – Communists	VPK	659	417	643	1,529	2,639	317	467	759	2,733	4,434	331	437	1,138	1,627	18,130	10.35%	1	0	1
Liberal People's Party	FP	210	80	225	750	310	119	151	323	456	1,781	76	72	94	784	5,431	3.10%	0	0	0
Christian Democratic Unity	KDS	282	76	158	468	188	82	52	173	234	804	22	69	122	1,098	3,828	2.19%	0	0	0
K-Party	K-P	82	23	55	92	293	84	40	204	265	342	61	74	223	146	1,984	1.13%	0	0	0
Green Party	MP	56	26	31	153	132	62	108	116	154	528	32	24	32	222	1,676	0.96%	0	0	0
Other parties		1	1	3	21	9	1	0	2	17	87	0	0	0	11	153	0.09%	0	0	0
Valid votes		6,560	2,668	5,872	19,849	16,008	5,173	4,585	13,091	17,626	43,957	3,543	4,059	5,841	26,324	175,156	100.00%	10	0	10
Rejected votes		36	19	35	75	82	25	21	48	65	243	12	21	32	155	869	0.49%			
Total polled		6,596	2,687	5,907	19,924	16,090	5,198	4,606	13,139	17,691	44,200	3,555	4,080	5,873	26,479	176,025	90.59%			
Registered electors		7,191	3,117	6,517	21,759	18,346	5,878	5,461	14,246	20,119	48,298	4,005	4,537	6,652	28,181	194,307				
Turnout		91.73%	86.20%	90.64%	91.57%	87.70%	88.43%	84.34%	92.23%	87.93%	91.52%	88.76%	89.93%	88.29%	93.96%	90.59%				

The following candidates were elected: Frida Berglund (S); Curt Boström (S); Per-Ola Eriksson (C); Sören Häggroth (S); Karl-Erik Häll (S); Paul Lestander (VPK); Kerstin Nilsson (S); Per Petersson (M); Åke Selberg (S); and Sten-Ove Sundström (S).

Permanent substitutions:

- Curt Boström (S) resigned on 30 June 1985 and was replaced by Bruno Poromaa (S) on 1 July 1985.

==== 1970s ====
===== 1979 =====
Results of the 1979 general election held on 16 September 1979:

Party		Votes per municipality														Total votes	%	Seats		
Party		Älvs- byn	Arje- plog	Arvids- jaur	Boden	Gälli- vare	Hapa- randa	Jokk- mokk	Kalix	Kiruna	Luleå	Över- kalix	Över- torneå	Pajala	Piteå	Total votes	%	Con.	Lev.	Tot.
Swedish Social Democratic Party	S	3,635	1,308	3,214	11,030	8,468	2,482	2,730	7,951	10,140	22,549	2,108	1,867	2,700	15,383	95,565	55.37%	6	0	6
Centre Party	C	970	428	891	2,683	1,434	1,108	516	1,970	1,257	5,823	689	1,122	822	4,049	23,762	13.77%	2	0	2
Moderate Party	M	388	203	318	2,480	1,768	701	430	1,073	1,526	5,702	200	367	550	2,062	17,768	10.30%	1	0	1
Left Party – Communists	VPK	732	465	658	1,459	2,467	260	534	703	2,528	4,365	376	485	1,153	1,528	17,713	10.26%	1	0	1
Liberal People's Party	FP	312	193	363	1,422	732	245	283	554	1,094	3,340	112	124	191	1,246	10,211	5.92%	0	1	1
Christian Democratic Unity	KDS	310	63	152	417	139	62	40	146	221	663	21	63	145	1,001	3,443	1.99%	0	0	0
Workers' Party – The Communists	APK	120	52	100	139	535	130	98	312	447	565	112	116	302	282	3,310	1.92%	0	0	0
Communist Party of Sweden	SKP	1	1	2	58	130	11	10	32	50	176	1	2	4	30	508	0.29%	0	0	0
Other parties		5	4	6	48	26	15	47	16	20	93	1	1	10	15	307	0.18%	0	0	0
Valid votes		6,473	2,717	5,704	19,736	15,699	5,014	4,688	12,757	17,283	43,276	3,620	4,147	5,877	25,596	172,587	100.00%	10	1	11
Rejected votes		21	8	20	47	39	7	16	35	48	160	0	13	22	100	536	0.31%			
Total polled		6,494	2,725	5,724	19,783	15,738	5,021	4,704	12,792	17,331	43,436	3,620	4,160	5,899	25,696	173,123	90.34%			
Registered electors		7,035	3,146	6,323	21,596	18,082	5,661	5,563	13,830	20,111	47,575	4,067	4,563	6,628	27,458	191,638				
Turnout		92.31%	86.62%	90.53%	91.60%	87.04%	88.69%	84.56%	92.49%	86.18%	91.30%	89.01%	91.17%	89.00%	93.58%	90.34%				

The following candidates were elected: Frida Berglund (S); Curt Boström (S); Karl-Erik Häll (S); Filip Johansson (C); Arne Lindberg (C); Eivor Marklund (VPK); Kerstin Nilsson (S); Per Petersson (M); Sten-Ove Sundström (S); Ingvar Svanberg (S); and Eva Winther (FP).

===== 1976 =====
Results of the 1976 general election held on 19 September 1976:

Party		Votes per municipality														Total votes	%	Seats		
Party		Älvs- byn	Arje- plog	Arvids- jaur	Boden	Gälli- vare	Hapa- randa	Jokk- mokk	Kalix	Kiruna	Luleå	Över- kalix	Över- torneå	Pajala	Piteå	Total votes	%	Con.	Lev.	Tot.
Swedish Social Democratic Party	S	3,343	1,327	3,012	10,288	8,046	2,307	2,730	7,812	9,702	21,683	2,173	1,853	2,793	14,113	91,182	53.75%	6	0	6
Centre Party	C	1,193	575	1,073	3,566	2,193	1,282	708	2,242	2,084	7,907	781	1,242	1,020	5,057	30,923	18.23%	2	0	2
Left Party – Communists	VPK	799	470	759	1,369	2,774	442	634	902	2,707	4,134	496	565	1,358	1,566	18,975	11.19%	1	1	2
Moderate Party	M	242	125	240	1,906	1,485	600	346	910	1,118	4,397	137	340	492	1,404	13,742	8.10%	1	0	1
People's Party	F	288	180	346	1,445	746	218	325	510	1,197	3,516	90	109	166	1,180	10,316	6.08%	0	1	1
Christian Democratic Unity	KDS	297	59	138	427	123	64	55	134	194	713	18	52	123	992	3,389	2.00%	0	0	0
Communist Party of Sweden	SKP	26	15	31	92	245	29	33	81	64	225	17	23	24	96	1,001	0.59%	0	0	0
Other parties		0	0	5	17	7	7	0	15	17	37	0	2	2	4	113	0.07%	0	0	0
Valid votes		6,188	2,751	5,604	19,110	15,619	4,949	4,831	12,606	17,083	42,612	3,712	4,186	5,978	24,412	169,641	100.00%	10	2	12
Rejected votes		17	4	13	34	45	14	14	16	24	101	4	6	16	52	360	0.21%			
Total polled		6,205	2,755	5,617	19,144	15,664	4,963	4,845	12,622	17,107	42,713	3,716	4,192	5,994	24,464	170,001	90.28%			
Registered electors		6,773	3,152	6,223	20,970	18,001	5,590	5,697	13,475	20,101	46,738	4,136	4,603	6,754	26,097	188,310				
Turnout		91.61%	87.40%	90.26%	91.29%	87.02%	88.78%	85.04%	93.67%	85.11%	91.39%	89.85%	91.07%	88.75%	93.74%	90.28%				

The following candidates were elected: Frida Berglund (S); Curt Boström (S); Karl-Erik Häll (S); Filip Johansson (C); Alf Lövenborg (VPK); Eivor Marklund (VPK); Kerstin Nilsson (S); Bengt Norling (S); Per Petersson (M); Torsten Stridsman (C); Ingvar Svanberg (S); and Eva Winther (F).

Permanent substitutions:

- Bengt Norling (S) resigned on 4 October 1977 and was replaced by Sten-Ove Sundström (S) on 5 October 1977.

===== 1973 =====
Results of the 1973 general election held on 16 September 1973:

Party		Votes per municipality														Total votes	%	Seats		
Party		Älvs- byn	Arje- plog	Arvids- jaur	Boden	Gälli- vare	Hapa- randa	Jokk- mokk	Kalix	Kiruna	Luleå	Över- kalix	Över- torneå	Pajala	Piteå	Total votes	%	Con.	Lev.	Tot.
Swedish Social Democratic Party	S	2,857	1,242	2,831	9,332	7,181	2,283	2,529	7,268	8,284	18,907	2,085	1,808	2,704	12,644	81,955	52.07%	6	0	6
Centre Party	C	1,117	530	1,018	3,241	1,987	1,215	681	2,183	2,034	7,432	768	1,299	1,070	4,510	29,085	18.48%	2	0	2
Left Party – Communists	VPK	955	621	872	1,679	3,042	533	830	1,008	3,163	4,044	549	578	1,470	1,829	21,173	13.45%	1	1	2
Moderate Party	M	201	101	300	1,797	1,560	679	295	849	1,042	3,734	139	321	466	1,188	12,672	8.05%	1	0	1
People's Party	F	253	137	324	1,175	525	176	269	389	1,054	2,549	81	83	197	825	8,037	5.11%	0	0	0
Christian Democratic Unity	KDS	230	61	118	487	98	33	68	114	213	704	25	40	142	950	3,283	2.09%	0	0	0
Communist Party of Sweden	SKP	8	13	46	52	262	11	4	77	49	237	23	39	2	66	889	0.56%	0	0	0
Communist League Marxist–Leninists (the revolutionaries)	KFML(r)	3	1	3	39	60	7	8	8	32	76	1	2	14	13	267	0.17%	0	0	0
Other parties		0	0	0	4	4	1	0	1	4	2	0	4	0	2	22	0.01%	0	0	0
Valid votes		5,624	2,706	5,512	17,806	14,719	4,938	4,684	11,897	15,875	37,685	3,671	4,174	6,065	22,027	157,383	100.00%	10	1	11
Rejected votes		10	4	6	8	20	11	4	11	14	52	7	5	13	18	183	0.12%			
Total polled		5,634	2,710	5,518	17,814	14,739	4,949	4,688	11,908	15,889	37,737	3,678	4,179	6,078	22,045	157,566	89.59%			
Registered electors		6,123	3,126	6,106	19,769	17,025	5,539	5,569	12,783	19,027	41,498	4,083	4,651	6,871	23,706	175,876				
Turnout		92.01%	86.69%	90.37%	90.11%	86.57%	89.35%	84.18%	93.15%	83.51%	90.94%	90.08%	89.85%	88.46%	92.99%	89.59%				

The following candidates were elected: Frida Berglund (S); Thure Dahlberg (S); Karl-Erik Häll (S); Uno Hedström (S); Filip Johansson (C); Alf Lövenborg (VPK); Eivor Marklund (VPK); Bengt Norling (S); Per Petersson (M); Torsten Stridsman (C); and Ingvar Svanberg (S).

===== 1970 =====
Results of the 1970 general election held on 20 September 1970:

Party		Votes per municipality															Total votes	%	Seats		
Party		Älvs- byn	Arje- plog	Arvids- jaur	Boden	Gälli- vare	Hapa- randa	Jokk- mokk	Kalix	Kiruna	Luleå	Över- kalix	Över- torneå	Pajala	Piteå	Postal votes	Total votes	%	Con.	Lev.	Tot.
Swedish Social Democratic Party	S	2,418	1,120	2,484	8,004	5,583	1,841	2,233	6,462	6,531	14,843	1,950	1,419	2,525	10,835	9,507	77,755	51.73%	5	1	6
Centre Party	C	842	322	705	2,273	1,147	1,007	450	1,695	1,091	5,056	650	1,130	882	3,529	2,898	23,677	15.75%	2	0	2
Left Party – Communists	VPK	922	508	788	1,373	2,823	495	790	847	2,702	3,081	537	634	1,325	1,641	2,136	20,602	13.71%	1	1	2
People's Party	F	272	182	418	1,556	783	260	316	501	1,376	3,119	118	108	186	1,082	2,310	12,587	8.37%	1	0	1
Moderate Party	M	147	63	223	1,193	1,170	406	219	621	666	2,455	129	331	411	886	2,403	11,323	7.53%	1	0	1
Christian Democratic Unity	KDS	224	60	85	393	143	43	72	111	219	608	34	30	130	735	533	3,420	2.28%	0	0	0
Communist League Marxists-Leninists	KFML	6	0	23	90	132	3	20	29	53	167	1	12	31	12	332	911	0.61%	0	0	0
Other parties		0	0	0	0	0	0	0	0	0	0	0	0	1	0	40	41	0.03%	0	0	0
Valid votes		4,831	2,255	4,726	14,882	11,781	4,055	4,100	10,266	12,638	29,329	3,419	3,664	5,491	18,720	20,159	150,316	100.00%	10	2	12
Rejected votes		3	3	4	5	6	5	6	3	5	31	2	8	4	23	60	168	0.11%			
Total polled exc. postal votes		4,834	2,258	4,730	14,887	11,787	4,060	4,106	10,269	12,643	29,360	3,421	3,672	5,495	18,743	20,219	150,484				
Postal votes		613	396	767	2,280	1,947	827	775	1,374	2,346	5,010	412	585	815	2,059	-20,219	-13				
Total polled inc. postal votes		5,447	2,654	5,497	17,167	13,734	4,887	4,881	11,643	14,989	34,370	3,833	4,257	6,310	20,802	0	150,471	86.40%			
Registered electors		6,158	3,229	6,227	19,726	16,703	5,655	5,966	12,820	18,606	39,503	4,430	4,925	7,353	22,860		174,161				
Turnout		88.45%	82.19%	88.28%	87.03%	82.22%	86.42%	81.81%	90.82%	80.56%	87.01%	86.52%	86.44%	85.82%	91.00%		86.40%				

The following candidates were elected: Frida Berglund (S); Thure Dahlberg (S); Karl-Erik Häll (S); Uno Hedström (S); Ivar Hermansson (VPK); Filip Johansson (C); Eivor Marklund (VPK); Bengt Norling (S); Bertil Öhvall (F); Per Petersson (M); Torsten Stridsman (C); and Ingvar Svanberg (S).

Permanent substitutions:

- Ivar Hermansson (VPK) resigned in January 1972 and was replaced by Alf Lövenborg (VPK).
