= List of governors of Norrbotten County =

Governor of Norrbotten County
- Landshövding i Norrlands län
- Coat of arms of Norrbotten County.
- Incumbent; Lotta Finstorp since 1 February 2021
- Norrbotten County Administrative Board
- Residence: The residence in Luleå, Luleå
- Appointer: Government of Sweden
- Term length: Six years (Note: The governor is often appointed for a six-year mandate. It can be extended if the person has not reached retirement age.)
- Precursor: Governor of Västerbotten County
- Formation: 1810
- First holder: Per Adolph Ekorn
- Deputy: County Director (Länsrådet)
- Salary: SEK 100,500/month (2016)
- Website: Governor Lotta Finstorp

This is a list of governors for Norrbotten County of Sweden. Norrbotten County separated from Västerbotten County in 1810; for a list of governors who ruled the area before that date, see List of governors of Västerbotten County.

Picture	Governor	Took office	Left office
	Per Adolph Ekorn	1810	1816
	Gustaf Adolph Koskull	1816	1821
	Paul Öhrvall	1821	1825
	Carl Georg Sparre	1825	1836
	Carl August von Hedenberg	1836	1849
	Hans Samuel Knut Åkerhielm	1849	1856
	Axel Emanuel Ros	1856	1859
	Per Henrik Widmark	1859	1861
	Sven Peter Bergman	1861	1873
	Henrik Adolf Widmark	1873	1885
	Lars Berg	1885	1893
	Karl Sigfrid Husberg	1893	1900
	Karl Johan Bergström	1900	1911
	Oscar von Sydow	1911	1917
	Carl Gösta Oskar Malm	1917	1928
	August Bernhard Gärde	1928	1937
	David Hansén	1937	1947
	Oskar Wilhelm Lövgren	1947	1952
	Folke Tunborg	1953	1957
	Manfred Näslund	1957	1966
	Ragnar Lassinantti	1966	1982
	Erik Hammarsten	1982	1985
	Curt Boström	1985	1991
	Gunnar Brodin	1992	1995
	Björn Rosengren	1996	1998
	Kari Marklund	1 January 1999	31 July 2003
	Per-Ola Eriksson	1 August 2003	31 July 2012
	Sven-Erik Österberg	1 October 2012	31 January 2018
	Johan Antti	1 February 2018 (Note: County Director (Länsrådet) Johan Antti served as acting governor from 1 February 2018.)	31 May 2018
	Björn O. Nilsson	1 June 2018	31 January 2021
	Lotta Finstorp	1 February 2021	30 November 2025
