= Linus Sköld =

Swedish politician (born 1983)

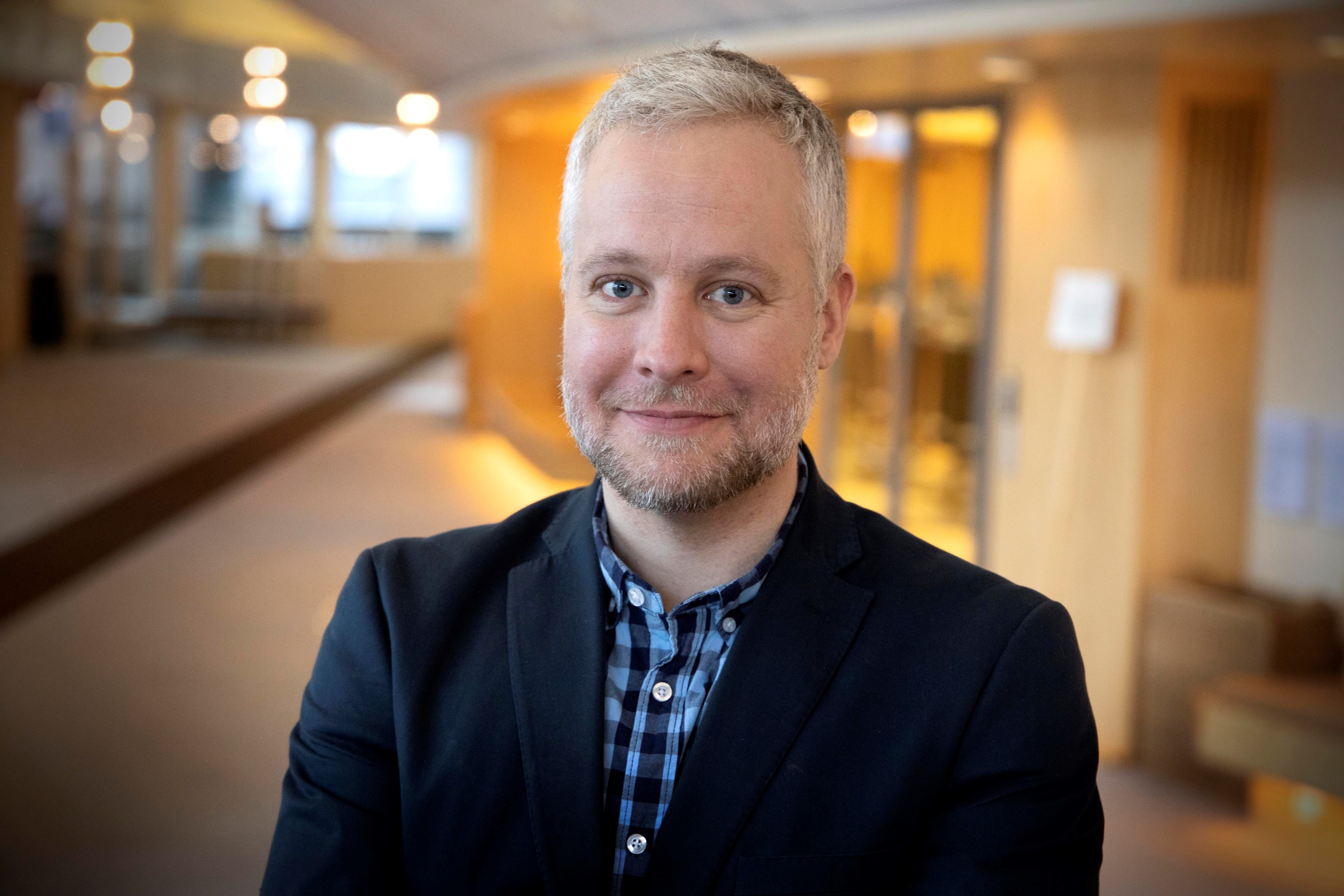
- Sköld in June 2020

Member of the Riksdag
- Incumbent
- Assumed office 30 January 2019
- Preceded by: Sven-Erik Bucht
- Constituency: Norrbotten County

Personal details
- Born: Linus Alexander Sköld; 1983 (age 42–43)
- Party: Social Democratic Party
- Education: Malmö University

Linus Alexander Sköld (born 1983) is a Swedish politician, teacher and member of the Riksdag, the national legislature. A member of the Social Democratic Party, he has represented Norrbotten County since January 2019. He had previously been a substitute member of the Riksdag four times: September 2015 to April 2016 (for Sven-Erik Bucht); February 2017 to August 2017 (for Hannah Bergstedt); April 2018 to June 2018 (for Hannah Bergstedt); and September 2018 to January 2019 (for Sven-Erik Bucht).

Sköld is the son of service technician Rolf Sköld and teacher June Sköld (née Schön). He was educated in Malmö. He has a teaching degree from Malmö University and a degree in educational leadership from Umeå University. He has been a teacher since 2008. He has been a member of the municipal council in Älvsbyn Municipality since 2016.
