= Birger Lahti =

Swedish politician (born 1964)

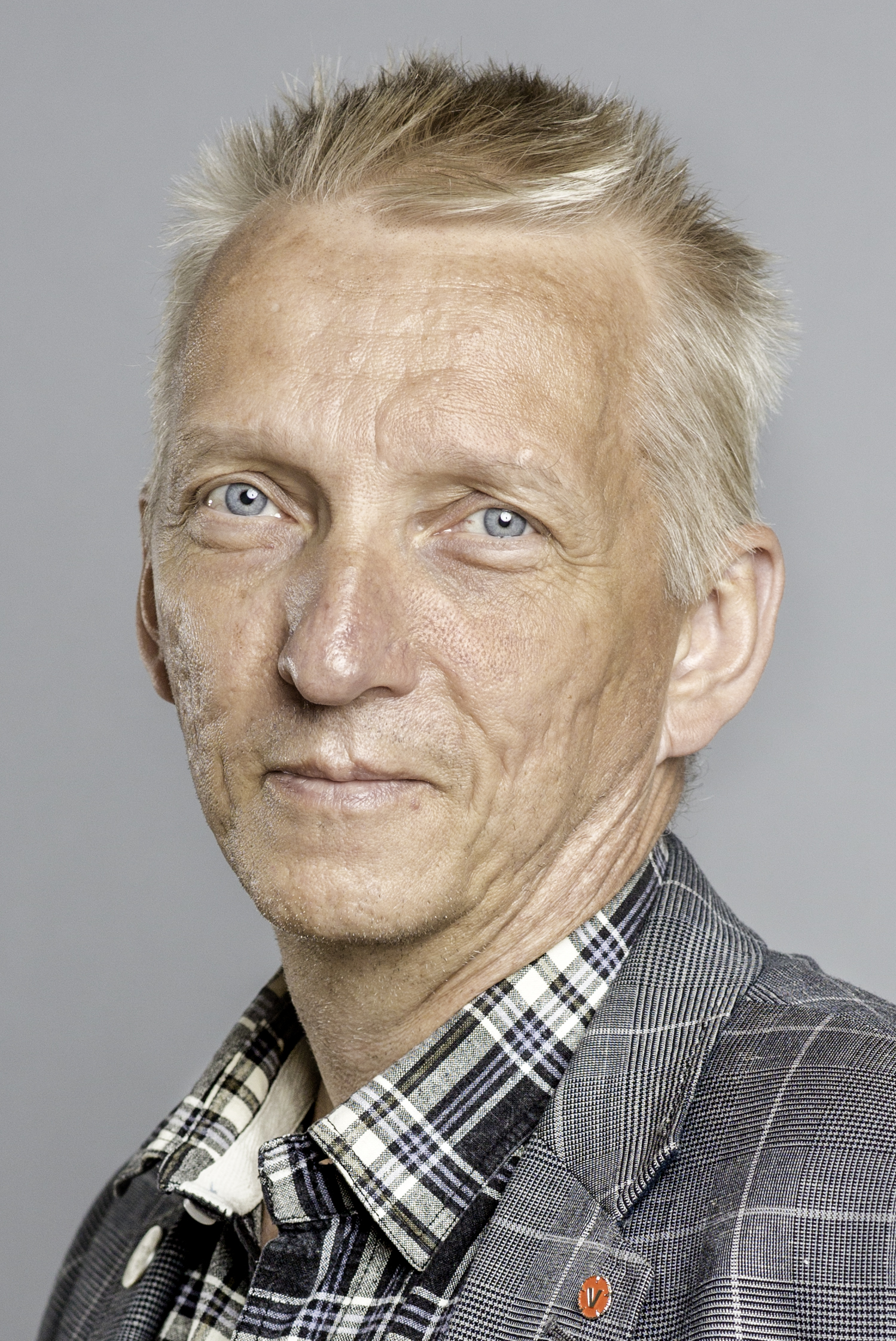
- Lahti in 2018

Member of the Riksdag
- Incumbent
- Assumed office 29 September 2014
- Constituency: Norrbotten County

Personal details
- Born: 12 November 1964 (age 61)
- Party: Left Party
- Spouse: Päivi
- Children: 2
- Profession: Forest worker

Birger Lahti (born 12 November 1964) is a Swedish politician. Since September 2014, he serves as Member of the Riksdag representing the constituency of Norrbotten County. He is affiliated with the Left Party. He was re-elected as Member of the Riksdag in September 2018 and September 2022.

== Early life ==
He is from Kaarnevara in the Pajala Municipality. When he was 11, his father participated in the 1975 Swedish forestry workers' strike. This sparked Lahti's political interest as he felt the Left Party was the only one truly supporting the workers. He is Tornedalian; his first language was Meänkieli.

== Career ==
In 1984, he began working as a forester. He also worked as a dairy farmer. In 2001, he was a Left Party leader in Pajala and continued working, as a forestry machine driver. He spoke in support of the party's feminist program. By 2005, he was a member of the Pajala Municipal Council. In 2012, he was elected to represent Norbotten County on the Left Party's board alongside Anna Hövenmark. Shortly after his election in 2014, Lahti became a party spokesperson for energy and business policy. He advocated for LKAB to take over Northland Resources after the latter declared bankruptcy and the future of the Kaunisvaara mine became uncertain. During his first term in the Riksdag, he was involved with the Committee on Industry, Committee on Transport, and the Committee on Environment and Agriculture.

In 2021, it was announced that he would be the new rural policy spokesperson for the Left Party. During the lead-up to the 2022 election, he spoke about finding a balance between working towards a future of renewable energy without crippling Northern Swedish economies (as they still rely heavily on forestry, diesel, and gasoline). In 2023, he expressed support for Hybrit, an effort to produce steel without carbon dioxide in Norbotten. As of March 2025, he was also working as the Left Party's energy policy spokesperson. He voiced opposition to legislation financing four large-scale nuclear reactors, in an effort to achieve net zero emissions by 2045.

== Personal life ==
He and his wife Päivi have two sons.
