= Fredrik Lundh Sammeli =

Swedish politician (born 1977)

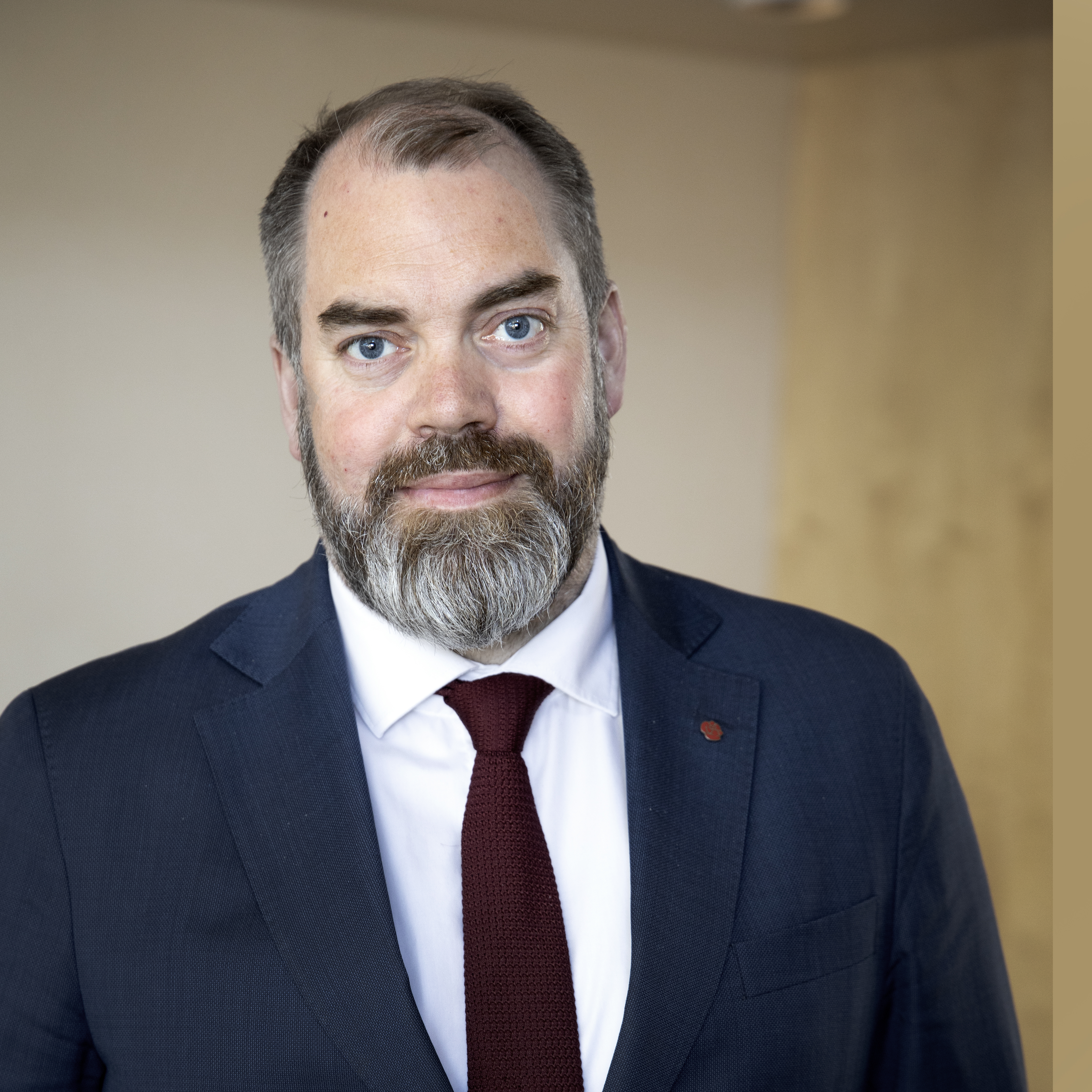
- Lundh Sammeli in June 2020

Member of the Riksdag
- Incumbent
- Assumed office 2 October 2006
- Constituency: Norrbotten County

Personal details
- Born: Carl Roland Fredrik Lundh Sammeli; 18 May 1977 (age 49)
- Party: Social Democratic Party

Military service
- Allegiance: Sweden
- Branch/service: Swedish Air Force
- Years of service: 1999–
- Unit: Norrbotten Wing

Carl Roland Fredrik Lundh Sammeli (born 1977) is a Swedish politician, air force officer and member of the Riksdag, the national legislature. A member of the Social Democratic Party, he has represented Norrbotten County since October 2006.

Lundh Sammeli is the son of Ebbe Lundh and Chatrine Lundh (née Nilsson). He was educated in Piteå and at the Air Force Officers College (FOHS) in Halmstad. He has been an officer in the Norrbotten Wing since 1999. He has been a member of the municipal council in Luleå Municipality from 2002 until 2018, and on its municipal board from 2002 to 2006. Since 2015 he has been the chairman of the local Social Democratic Party in Norrbotten and a member of the national party board.
