= Linda Frohm =

Swedish politician (born 1977)

Member of the Riksdag
- Incumbent
- Assumed office 28 September 2026
- Constituency: Norrbotten County

Personal details
- Born: 12 February 1977 (age 49) Sweden
- Party: Moderate Party

Linda Frohm (born 12 February 1977) is a Swedish politician from the Moderate Party. She has been a member of the Riksdag since 2026, elected for the Norrbotten County constituency.

== Biography ==
Frohm has been politically active for the Moderate Party in Norrbotten. She has been a regional councilor in opposition in Region Norrbotten and is chairwoman of the Moderate Party in Norrbotten County.

Frohm has served as a member of the Moderate Party's party board for several terms. She was re-elected to the party board at the party's general meeting in 2021. She has also worked on entrepreneurial issues within the party and has chaired one of the Moderate Women's reform groups focusing on entrepreneurship.

In the Norrbotten Region, Frohm has been active in health and medical policy issues.

In the 2026 Swedish general election, Frohm was elected as a member of parliament for the Norrbotten County constituency.

== See also ==
- List of members of the Riksdag, 2026–2030
