= Samuel Pettersson =

Swedish politician (born 2001)

Member of the Riksdag
- Incumbent
- Assumed office 28 September 2026
- Constituency: Norrbotten County

Personal details
- Born: 5 September 2001 (age 25)
- Party: Social Democratic Party

Samuel Peder Pettersson Frank (born 5 September 2001) is a Swedish politician who was elected member of the Riksdag in 2026. He previously served as chairman of the Swedish Social Democratic Youth League in Norrbotten County.
