= Paul Lestander =

Swedish politician (1926–2012)

Member of the Riksdag
- In office 3 October 1982 – 1 October 1989
- Constituency: Norrbotten County

Personal details
- Born: 17 April 1926
- Died: 2012 (aged 85–86)
- Party: Left Party–Communists
- Children: 5

Paul Lestander (25 April 1926 – 2012) was a Swedish politician. A member of the Left Party–Communists, he served in the Riksdag from 1982 to 1989.

== Life and career ==
He was born on 25 April 1926. He began working in the forests at the age of 15. He gained national attention for his role as a spokesman during the 1975 Swedish forestry workers' strike.

Representing Norrbotten County, he began his first term in the Riksdag on 3 October 1982. He stepped down from his position in the Riksdag on 1 October 1989, and was replaced by Bengt Hurtig. After leaving the Riksdag, Lestander was active in the Arjeplog municipal council.

He was first married to Sonja Lestander, with whom he had three children. After her death, he later married Inger Marklund. They had two children. He died in 2012 at the age of 86.
