= Zara Leghissa =

Swedish politician (born 1970)

Member of the Riksdag
- Incumbent
- Assumed office 26 September 2022
- Constituency: Norrbotten County

Personal details
- Born: 1970 (age 55–56)
- Party: Social Democratic Party

Zara Viktoria Leghissa (born 1970) is a Swedish politician and member of the Riksdag, the national legislature. A member of the Social Democratic Party, she has represented Norrbotten County since September 2022.

Leghissa worked as a nursing assistant in a nursing home. She was a member of the board of the Northern Sweden branch of the Swedish Trade Union Confederation (LO). She is a member of the municipal council in Boden Municipality.
