= Mattias Karlsson (politician, born 1972) =

Swedish politician (born 1972)

Member of the Riksdag
- Incumbent
- Assumed office 24 September 2018
- Constituency: Norrbotten County

Personal details
- Born: 19 May 1972 (age 54)
- Party: Moderate Party

Mattias Karlsson (born 19 May 1972) is a Swedish politician serving as a member of the Riksdag since 2018. He has served as group leader of the Moderate Party since 2022.
