= Hanna Wigh =

Swedish politician

Member of the Riksdag
- In office 2014–2018
- Constituency: Norrbotten County

Personal details
- Born: 15 October 1986 (age 39) Skaraborgs län
- Party: Sweden Democrats

Hanna Elin Erica Wigh Mazeitaviciené (formerly Fallås) is a Swedish politician and animal rights activist. She served as an MP in the Riksdag for the Sweden Democrats party and was elected in 2014.

== Biography ==
Wigh has been a group leader for the Sweden Democrats in the municipal council, a member of the party board and was district chairman of SD Skaraborg. In February 2011, she led a campaign against serving Halal meat in public schools in Falköping municipality, despite the fact that six months earlier the municipality had announced publicly that no ritually slaughtered meat was on the menu and that the municipality was working with local suppliers. However, it was later uncovered that the municipality was serving halal slaughtered lamb from New Zealand.

During the 2014 Swedish general election, Wigh was elected to the Riksdag to represent Norrbotten County. In parliament, she served on the social affairs committee.

In 2017, Wigh announced she would not seek another term in parliament (but would continue her local duties) after bringing charges of sexual misconduct against a "high-ranking parliamentary colleague" and claiming to have received threats from within the party after speaking out against another Sweden Democrat politician who she said was guilty of financial irregularities. In an interview with TV4, party leader Jimmie Akesson stated that he supported Wigh and would investigate her allegations. Wigh also stated to have suffered from PTSD and depression during her time in politics. Wigh subsequently filed a complaint against the party member accused of assault but the charges were dropped.

Since leaving parliament, she has founded a pressure group focusing on animal rights and an association for survivors of assault.

== Controversies ==
In September 2015, the constituency office in Falköping of Wigh and her party colleague Madeleine Larsson was subjected to a series of attacks, where stones were thrown at the windows and the walls were graffitied. The police investigated the incident but no one was charged. In 2017, a man was charged with vandalism following a similar attack on Wigh's office.

In March 2016, Wigh reported party colleague Anders Forsberg to the police after party colleague Madeleine Larsson discovered that he embezzled SEK 1.14 million from the party donors in the years 2013–2015. Forsberg issued a public apology and paid back the money but denied he had intentionally embezzled money. Wigh stated that she chose to file the report as the SD would not.

After stepping down from parliament, Wigh was accused of not handing back a mobile phone, laptop and a tablet she had been allocated by the Riksdag for her parliamentary work. Wigh responded by stating she had no interest in taking the items and had been in contact with the Riksdag administrative team to hand them back.
