= Eric Palmqvist =

Swedish politician (born 1970)

Member of the Swedish Riksdag for Norrbotten
- Incumbent
- Assumed office 24 September 2018

Personal details
- Born: 18 October 1970 (age 55) Sweden
- Party: Sweden Democrats

Eric Mark Palmqvist (born 18 October 1970) is a Swedish politician. He is currently a Sweden Democratic member of the Swedish Riksdag for Norrbotten. Before becoming a politician he worked as a truck driver.

He was also elected as Member of the Riksdag in September 2022.
