= Maria Stenberg =

Swedish politician (born 1966)

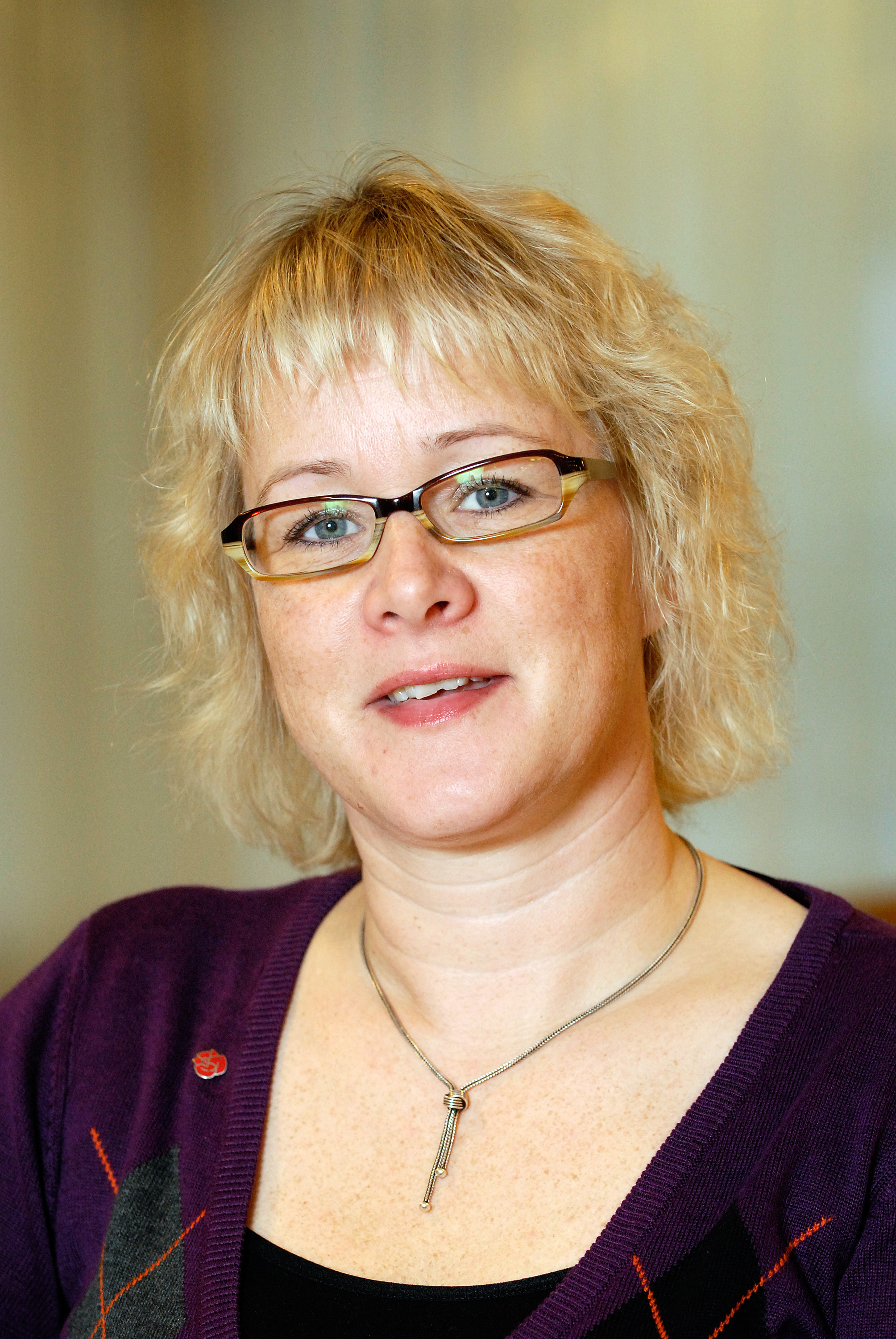
Maria Stenberg

Maria Stenberg (born 7 July 1966) is a Swedish social democratic politician. She has been a member of the Riksdag between 2002 and 2014.
