= Bruno Poromaa =

Swedish politician (1936–2016)

Bruno Poromaa (10 May 1936 – 11 September 2016) was a Swedish politician. He was a member of the Riksdag from 1982 to 1994, stepping down to become commissioner of Kiruna Municipality. Poromaa retired in 1998 and died in 2016 at the age of 80.
