= Lennart Klockare =

Swedish politician (born 1945)

Lennart Klockare (born 1945) is a Swedish social democratic politician, member of the Riksdag 1994–2006.
