= Siv Holma =

Swedish politician (1952–2016)

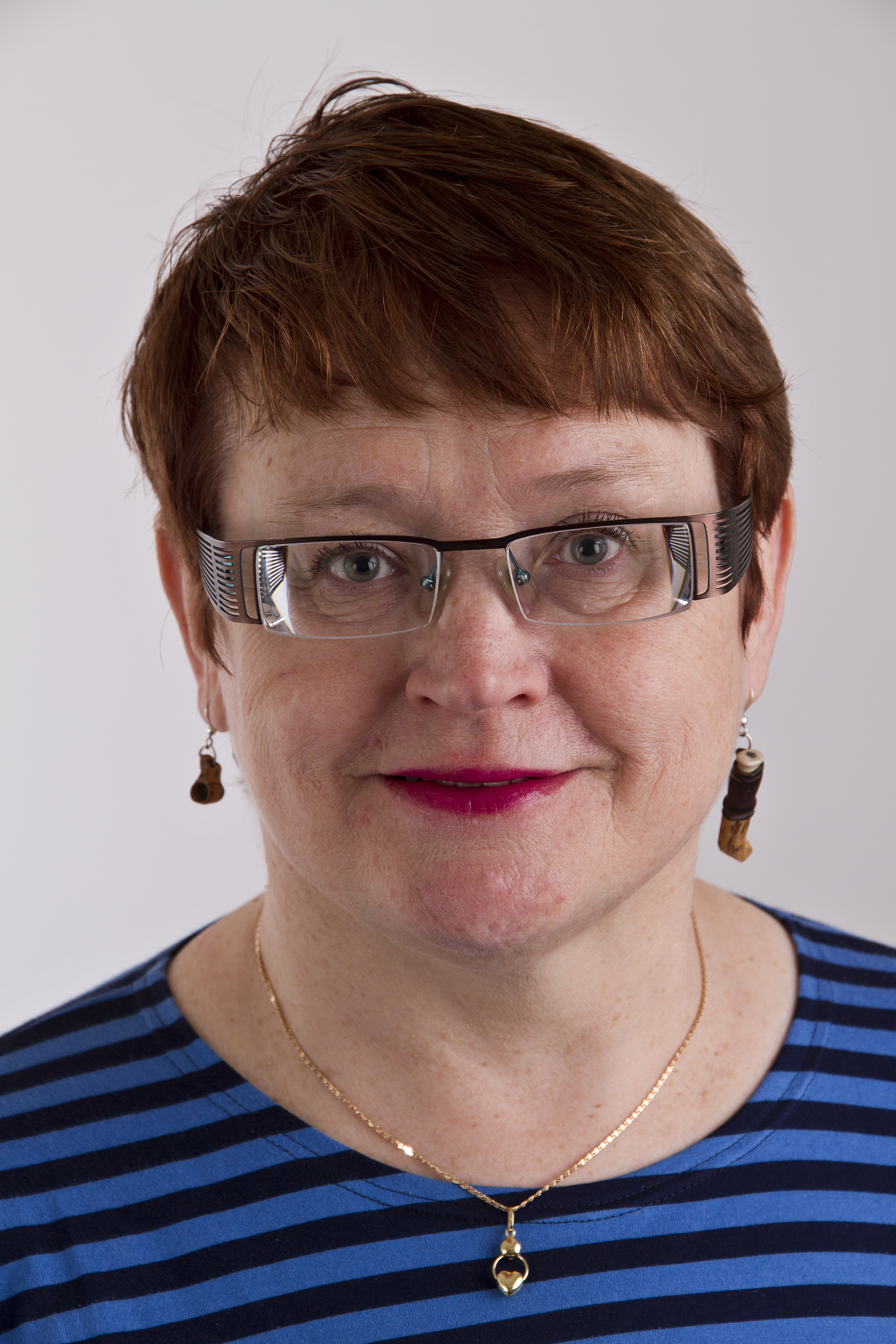
Siv Holma in 2010

Siv Holma (27 August 1952 – 24 October 2016) was a Swedish politician (Left Party), and former member of the Riksdag serving from 1998 to 2014. She was a Tornedalian.
