= 1975 Swedish forestry workers' strike =

- Date: 21 March 1975—3 June 1975
- Location: Sweden
- Goals: Monthly salary to replace piece work
- Methods: Work stoppage
- Result: Monthly salary of 3,800 SEK

Parties
| Forestry workers | Forestry companies |

Number
| 8,000–15,000 | |

The 1975 Swedish forestry workers' strike was a major wildcat strike by Northern Swedish forestry workers which took place between 21 March 1975 and 3 June 1975. The number of participants has been variously estimated between 8,000 and 15,000. After roughly ten weeks of deadlocks, an agreement was reached: workers would receive a monthly salary of 3,800 SEK. Employers would also assume responsibility for purchasing work clothes, protective gear, chainsaws, and fuel.

== Background ==
At the time of the strike, Swedish forests made up a quarter of the national economy. The forest-associated industries employed around 180,000 people, while the Swedish Forest Workers' Union had roughly 25,000 members. The forestry companies' record profits in 1974 sparked concern among workers that their union was not adequately representing them. Piece work (being paid per unit, rather than a fixed wage) was a major point of contention. The industry was also dangerous; occupational injuries were five times higher among forest workers compared to the average.

A wildcat strike had previously been tried in 1971, but was called off without obtaining any major results.

== Strike ==
On Friday, 21 March 1975, some forest workers turned off their chainsaws at 4:00 p.m., about 15 minutes before the work day was due to end. Workers sought 4,000 SEK in monthly wages plus a daily allowance of 25 SEK. The idea of a monthly wage did not represent a straightforward net benefit to all forestry employees. Fit and healthy workers could earn much more than 4,000 SEK a month with the previous system, but some still supported the strike. A 33-year old woodcutter (in his prime working years) reflected in an interview with Dagens Nyheter that during the course of a worker's lifetime, "no one loses by having a monthly salary." As a wildcat strike, it was not sanctioned by the Swedish Forest Workers' Union; they argued it had been instigated by left-wing extremists. Paul Lestander, who later was in the Riksdag from 1982 to 1991, served as a spokesperson for the workers.

On 25 March, Dagens Nyheter reported a nearly complete work stoppage in Västerbotten. Roughly a third of workers went on strike in Norrbotten, a so-called sympathy strike they had already gotten monthly salaries on a trial basis. Some localities, including Kalix and Pajala, had not yet decided whether or not to participate. The number of participants has been variously estimated between 8,000 and 15,000. It also came to also involve workers in Västernorrland and Jämtland.

Forestry worker union chairman Sixten Bäckström expressed doubt about a possible resolution in 27 March interview. He reported that the forestry employers were not willing to consider the monthly wage and daily allowance. The director of the Forestry Employers Association, Sven Malmgren, also conveyed the situation to be deadlocked on 16 April, reporting a "categorial no" from the employers. On 24 April, Dagens Nyheter reported that timber stockpiles were running low.

Sveriges Radio P1 held a live broadcast on 6 May about the strike from a people's house in Viksmon, Ångermanland.

A strike committee meeting on 31 May in Skellefteå determined the strike would end on Monday. There were concerns raised about what should be done with the hundreds of strikebreakers who were working in the forests. On 3 June 1975, a formal agreement was reached. Workers would receive a monthly salary of 3,800 SEK and employers would assume responsibility for purchasing work clothes, protective gear, chainsaws, and fuel.
