= Birgitta Ahlqvist =

Swedish politician (born 1948)

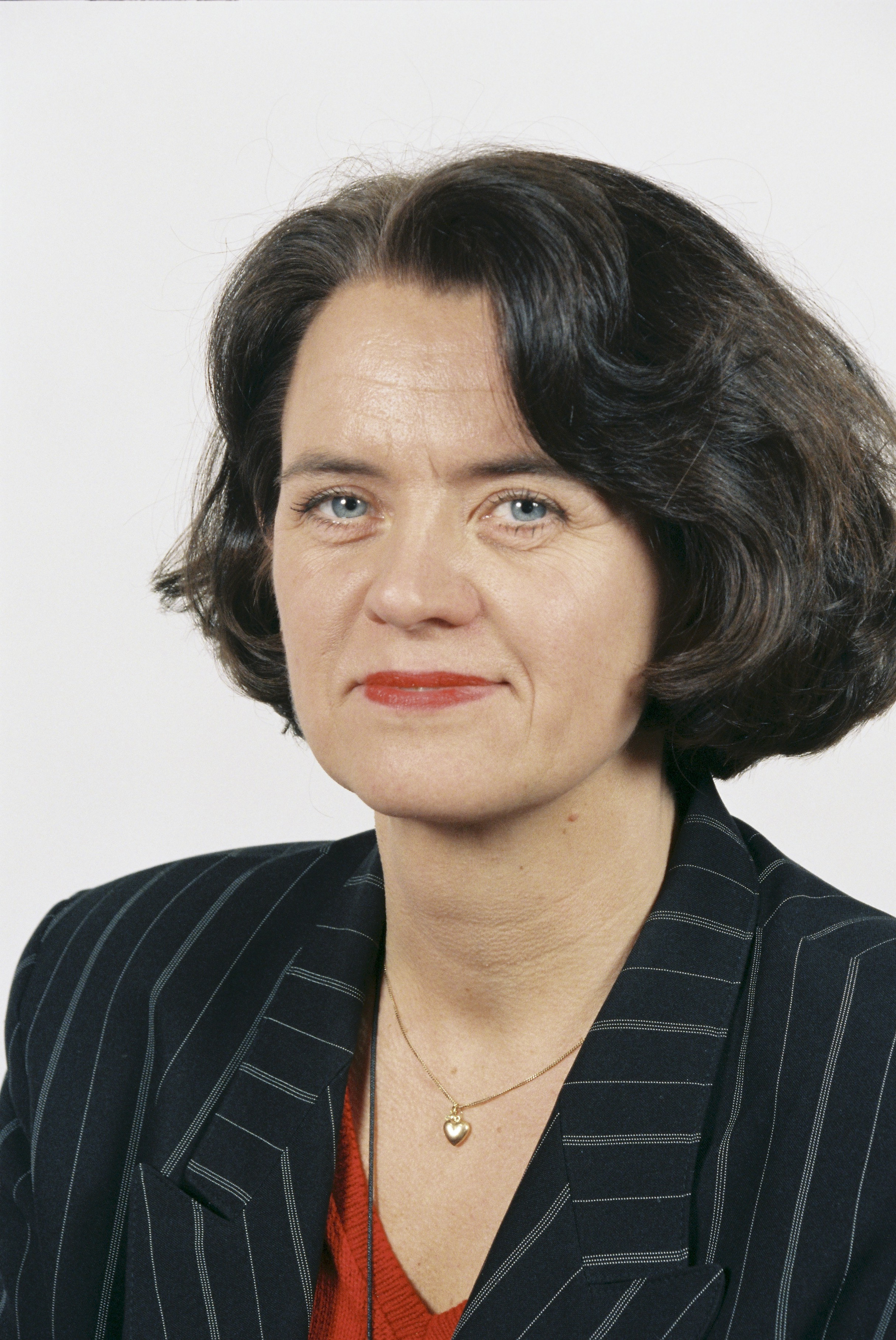
Birgitta Ahlqvist (1994)

Birgitta Ahlqvist (born 16 May 1948) is a Swedish Social Democratic politician and former member of parliament. She was a member of the Riksdag from 1994 to 1995, and then again from 1998 to 2006.
