= Bengt Norling =

Swedish politician (1925–2002)

Governor of Värmland
- In office 1977–1990

Minister of Communications (Transport)
- In office 14 October 1969 – 8 October 1976
- Prime Minister: Olof Palme
- Preceded by: Svante Lundkvist
- Succeeded by: Bo Turesson

Personal details
- Born: 1925 Malmö, Sweden
- Died: 2 June 2002 (aged 76–77)
- Party: Social Democratic Party
- Spouse: Elizabeth Norling

Bengt Norling (1925–2002) was a Swedish social democrat politician who held several government posts. He was the minister of communications (Transport) from 1969 and 1976 and the governor of Värmland from 1977 to 1990.

== Biography ==
Norling was born in Malmö in 1925 and raised in Norrbotten. At 15 he began to work as a metal worker and then became a railway official in Vansbro. During this period he joined the Swedish Social Democratic Party in Vansbro. In 1956 he was named an ombudsman in the Railway Workers' Associations.

Norling was made the secretary of the Swedish Trade Union Confederation. He was appointed the minister of communications (Transport) to the first cabinet of Prime Minister Olof Palme on 14 October 1969. Norling remained in the post until 1976. He served as the governor of Värmland between 1977 and 1990.

Following his retirement Norling settled in Karlstad with his wife, Elizabeth. They had a son. He died at age 77 on 2 June 2002.
