= Lars U. Granberg =

Swedish politician (born 1965)

Lars Urban Lennart Granberg (born 1965) is a Swedish Social Democratic Party politician, member of the Riksdag since 1994.
