= Anna Ibrisagic =

Swedish politician (born 1967)

Anna Ibrisagic (born 23 May 1967 in Sanski Most, SFR Yugoslavia) is a Swedish politician for the Moderate Party.

She was a Member of the Swedish Parliament from 2002 to 2004, and a Member of the European Parliament (MEP) from 2004 to 2014. She sat on the European Parliament's Committee on Foreign Affairs, and was a member of the Subcommittee on Security and Defence as well as a substitute for the Committee on Employment and Social Affairs.

== Career ==
- Interpreter, German, Russian, and English (1985)
- Studies at the Faculty of Economics (1988-1991)
- Solo singer (opera) (1991)
- Authorised interpreter Swedish/Bosnian (1994)
- Music teacher's diploma (1998)
- Music teacher (since 1988)
- Self-employed (since 1990)
- Export manager (1998-2001)
- Managing Director of Norrbotten Chamber of Commerce (2001-2002)
- Member of Luleå Municipal Council, executive board, children's and education committee (1998-2002)
- Chairman of the Moderate Party in Luleå (2000-2001)
- Member of the Moderate Party's executive board (2001-2011)
- Member of the Swedish Parliament (2002-2004)
- Member of the Committee on Education
- Substitute member of the Committee on Cultural Affairs (2002-2004)
- Member of the executive of Paneuropa Sverige (2003)
