= Karin Åström =

Swedish politician (born 1953)

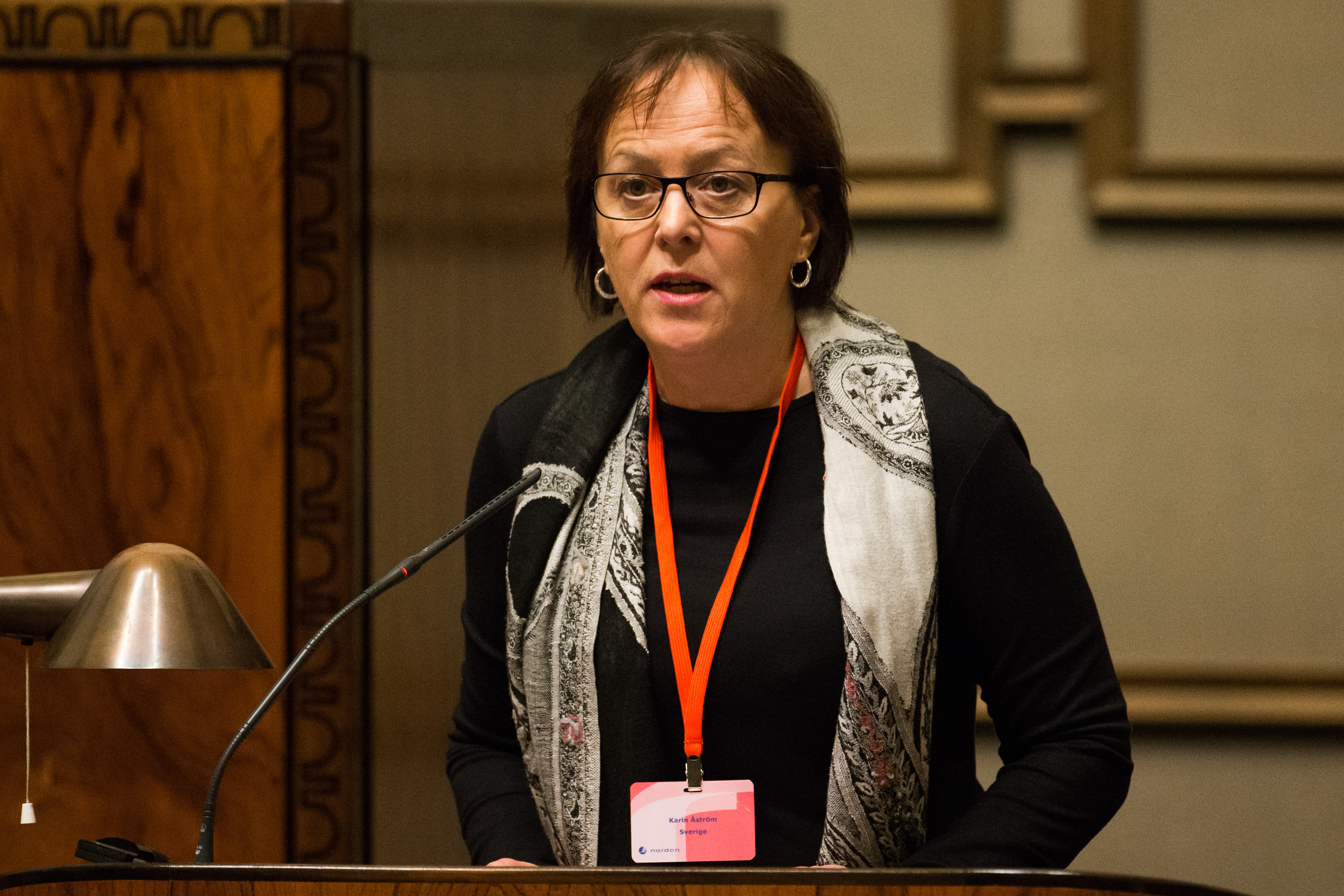
Karin Åström at the Nordic Council in Helsinki 2012

Karin Åström (born 1953) is a Swedish politician, who served three terms as a member of the Riksdag for the Social Democratic Party from 2004 to 2014, representing Norrbotten County. She served as President of the Nordic Council in 2014.

== Member of Parliament ==
As a member of the Riksdag, she served as a member of the Committee on the Constitution. In 2013 she announced the she would not seek reelection in 2014.

== President of the Nordic Council ==
In 2013 she was elected President of the Nordic Council for the year 2014. As President of the Nordic Council, she criticized the Russian decision to hold a referendum in Crimea on accession as illegitimate and unacceptable. She is a native of Överkalix.
