= Leif Pettersson =

Swedish politician (born 1954)

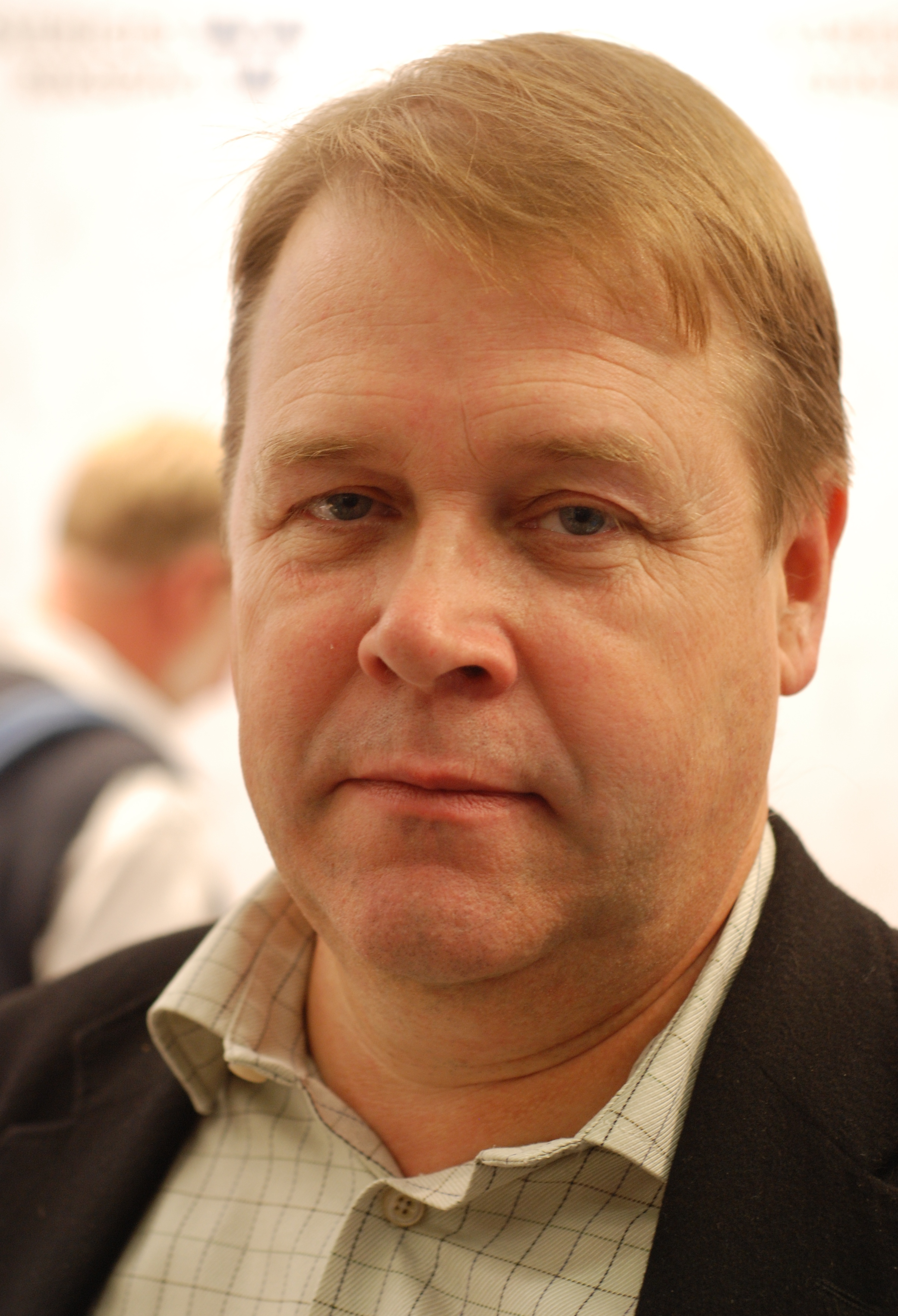

member of the Riksdag
- In office 2006-10-02 – 2018-09-24

Personal details
- Political party: Social Democratic Party

Leif Pettersson, born in 1954, is a Swedish politician of the Social Democratic Party. He was a member of the Riksdag between 2006 and 2018, and served in the Election Review Board from 2011 until March 2019. He also held various positions as both member and deputy member in other committees between 2006 and 2018.
