= Ewa Hedkvist Petersen =

Swedish politician

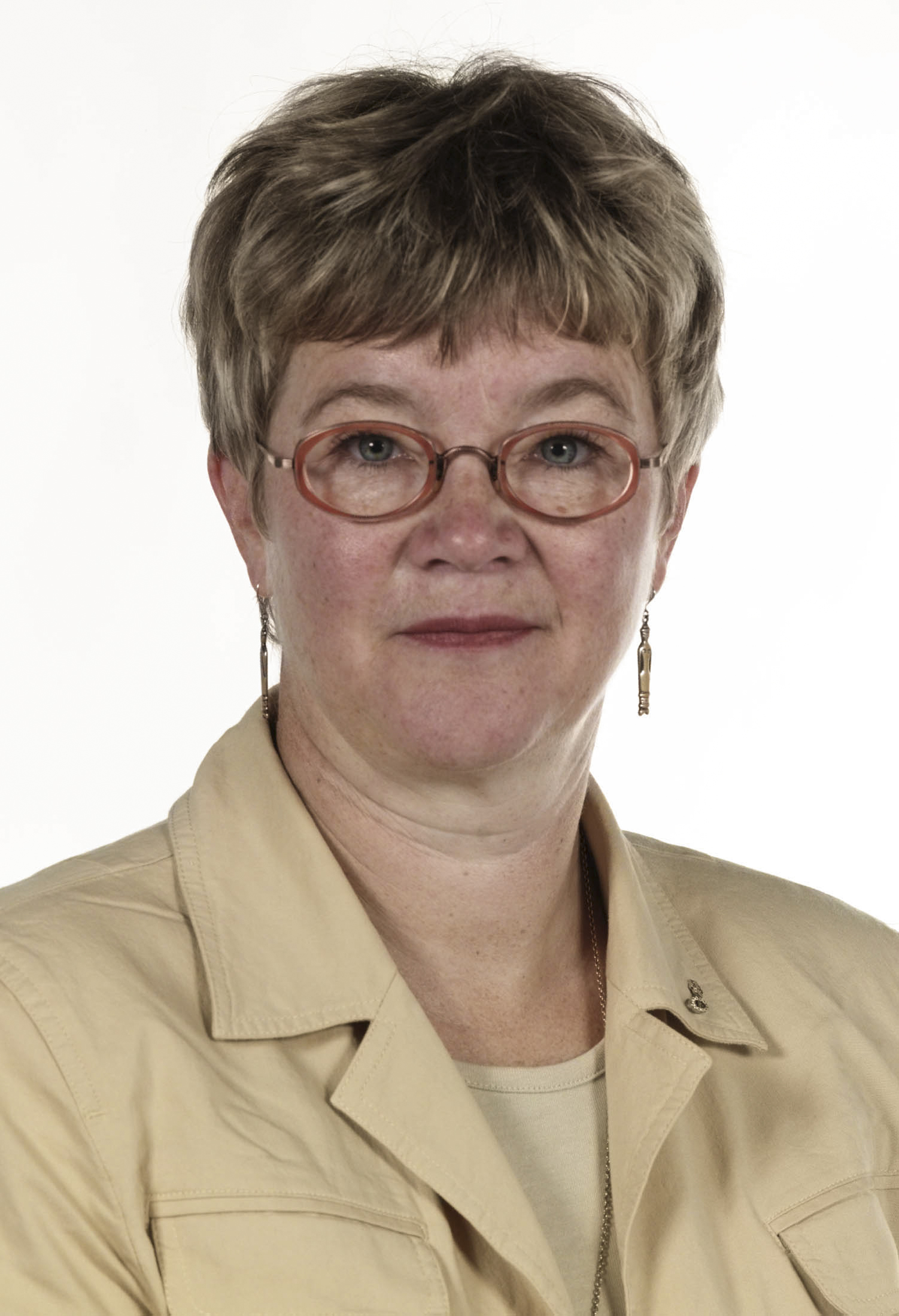
Petersen in 1999

Ewa Hedkvist Petersen (born 15 January 1952 in Arvidsjaur, Norrbotten) is a Swedish politician representing the Social Democratic Workers' Party of Sweden. She was a Member of the Riksdag between 1985 and 1994, and a Member of the European Parliament from 1999 to 2007. As a MEP she sat on the Committee on Transport and Tourism.

== Career ==
- Degree in social studies (1974)
- School welfare officer (1974–1979)
- Social welfare secretary (1979–1983)
- Family law secretary (1983–1994)
- Chief education officer (1994–1998)
- Assistant project leader (1998–1999)
- Social welfare secretary (1983–1994), chief education officer (1994–1998), assistant project leader (1998–1999)
- Family law secretary (1983–1994)
- Chief Education Officer (1994–1998)
- Assistant project leader (1998–1999)
- Member of Norrbotten county council (since 1998)
- Chairwoman of the Norrbotten county education board (1987–1992), Member of the Swedish Parliament (1985–1994)
- second Vice-Chairwoman of the Social Democratic group in the Swedish Parliament (1991–1994)
- Government-appointed leader of the inquiry into the establishment of a Children's Rights Ombudsman (1991)
- Chairwoman of the State Committee on Child Abuse (since 1999)
- Member of the Council, Technical University of Luleå (1988–1997)
- Chairman of Filmpool Nord (since 1992), Vice-Chairman of the board of the Swedish Film Institute (1995–1999)
- Member of the European Parliament 1999-2007
