= Krister Hammarbergh =

Swedish politician (born 1963)

Krister Hammarbergh (born 1963) is a Swedish politician of the Moderate Party. He was member of the Riksdag representing Norrbotten County from 2004 to 2018. In 2010, he was appointed the Moderate Party's Chairman in the Riksdag Justice Committee. Before his election to the Riksdag, he was an opposition politician in Luleå Municipality.
