= Kristina Zakrisson =

Swedish politician (born 1956)

Kristina Zakrisson (born 2 March 1956) is a former Swedish social democratic politician. She was a member of the Riksdag from 1994 to 2010 and has been a councillor of the Kiruna Municipality since 2011.
