= Sven-Erik Bucht =

Swedish politician (born 1954)

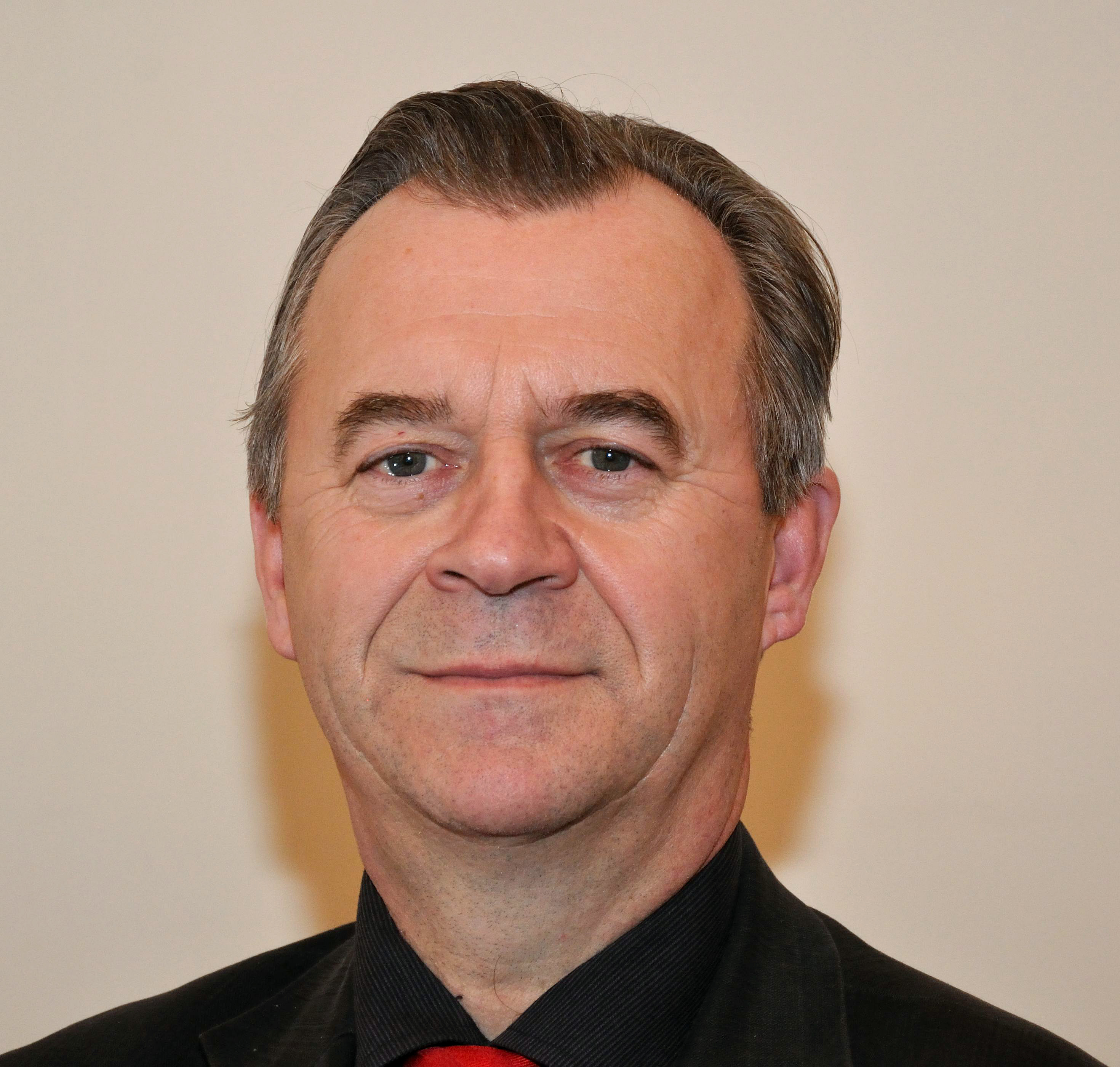

Minister for Rural Affairs
- In office 3 October 2014 – 21 January 2019
- Monarch: Carl XVI Gustaf
- Prime Minister: Stefan Löfven
- Preceded by: Eskil Erlandsson
- Succeeded by: Jennie Nilsson

Personal details
- Born: 28 December 1954 (age 71)
- Party: Social Democrats

Sven-Erik Bucht (born 28 December 1954) is a Swedish politician of the Social Democrats. He served as Minister for Rural Affairs in the Löfven cabinet from 2014 to 2019.

Bucht served municipal commissioner in Haparanda from 2003 to 2010. During this time an IKEA shop was established in Haparanda.

In 2010, he was elected to the Riksdag.
