= Per-Ola Eriksson =

Swedish politician (born 1946)

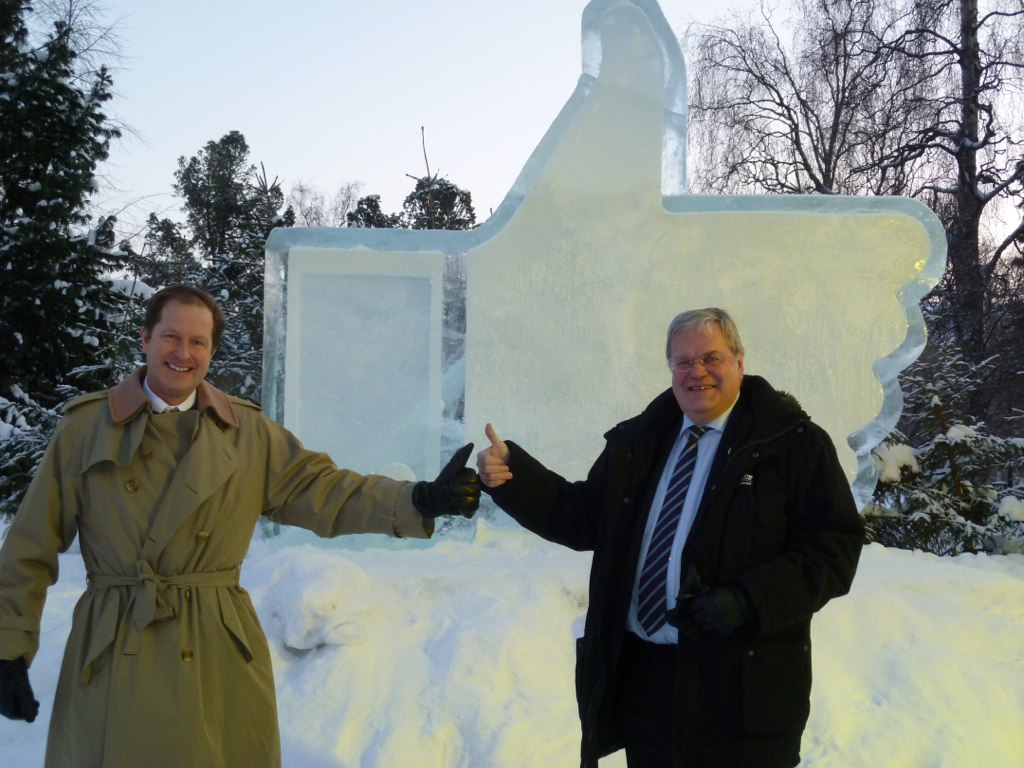
- On February 2, 2012 Ambassador Brzezinski concluded his tour of Norrbotten by having lunch at Governor Per-Ola Eriksson's residence in Luleå, visiting the site of the Facebook servers, a visit to Aurorum Science Park together with the Mayor of Luleå Karl Petersen and visiting Swerea MEFOS, a metallurgical research institute.

Governor of Norrbotten County
- In office 1 August 2003 – 2012
- Appointed by: Cabinet of Persson
- Preceded by: Kari Marklund
- Succeeded by: Sven-Erik Österberg

Personal details
- Born: 18 October 1946 (age 79) Kalix, Sweden
- Party: Centre Party

Per-Ola Anders Eriksson (born October 18, 1946) is a Swedish politician. He is a member of the Centre Party. Eriksson was a member of the Parliament of Sweden from 1982 to 1998, and held the key post as chairman of the Committee on Finance from 1991 to 1994, when his party was part of the coalition forming Cabinet of Carl Bildt, which did not have a parliamentary majority on its own. He was director general of Nutek from 1999 to 2002, and became county governor of Norrbotten County in 2003.

== Awards ==
- H. M. The King's Medal, 12th size gold medal on Seraphim Order ribbon
