= Curt Boström =

Swedish politician (1926–2014)

Personal details
- Born: Curt Birger Boström; 31 December 1926 Öjebyn, Sweden
- Died: 3 March 2014 (aged 87) Piteå, Sweden
- Party: Swedish Social Democratic Party

Curt Boström (1926–2014) was a Swedish social democrat politician. He was the minister of communication between 1982 and 1985 and governor of the Norrbotten County between 1985 and 1991.

== Early life and education ==
Boström was born in Öjebyn on 31 December 1926. He was educated in Piteå and received a secondary school diploma. Following the death of his father he began to work at age 14.

== Career ==
After working at different jobs Boström was employed by the newspaper Piteå-Tidningen as a sports journalist in 1946. Next he worked for Flottningsföreningen until his political career in the 1970s.

In 1974 Boström was elected to the Swedish Parliament for the Social Democrat Party. His term at the Parliament ended in 1985. He was appointed minister of communication in 1982 which he held until 1985. The cabinet was led by Prime Minister Olof Palme. Boström also served as the minister of defense in the same cabinet. Then Boström was named as the governor of the Norrbotten County and remained in office until 1991.

== Personal life and death ==
Boström married in 1950 and had a son. He died in Piteå in March 2014.
