= Hannah Bergstedt =

Swedish politician (born 1977)

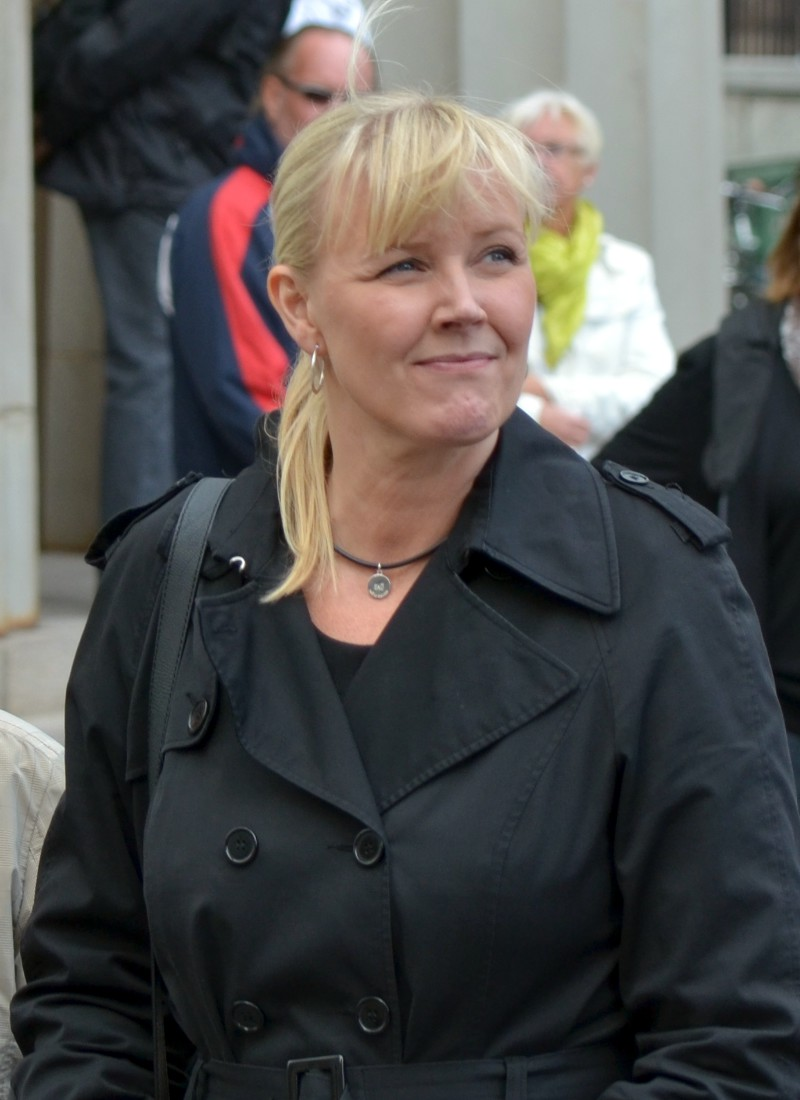
- Born: 1977 (age 48–49)
- Occupation: Politician
- Known for: Member of the Riksdag

Hannah Bergstedt (born 1977) is a Swedish Social Democratic Party politician.

She was elected deputy member of the Riksdag for the period 2006–2010, when she met as replacement delegate from August 2007 to March 2008, and from October 2008 to January 2009. She was elected ordinary member of the Riksdag for the period 2010–2014, and reelected for the period 2014–2018 from the constituency Norrbottens län. In the Riksdag she has been member of the Committee on Civil Affairs and the Taxation Committee.
