= 2021 Swedish government crisis =

Government crisis in Sweden

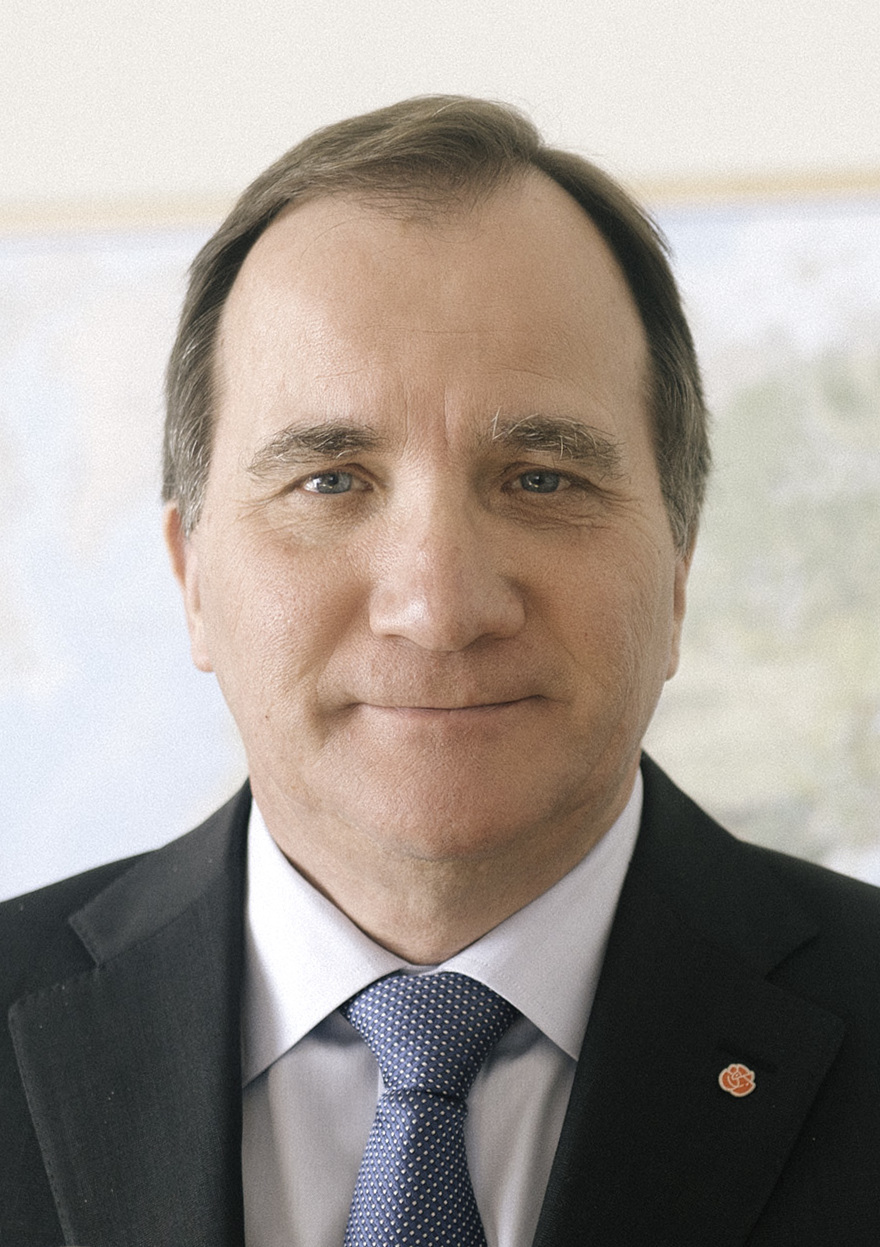
- Re-elected Prime Minister Stefan Löfven
- Date: 21 June–7 July 2021
- Type: Government crisis
- Cause: Motion of no confidence over a bill that would end rent control
- Participants: Social Democrats (S); Moderate Party (M); Sweden Democrats (SD); Centre Party (C); Left Party (V); Christian Democrats (KD); Liberals (L); Green Party (MP)
- Outcome: Stefan Löfven is ousted as prime minister; C abandons their demand to end rent control; L leaves the basis for the S–MP Löfven II cabinet; Löfven is re-elected as prime minister and forms the S–MP Löfven III cabinet tolerated by C and V; January Agreement is dissolved

A government crisis began on 21 June 2021 in Sweden after the Riksdag ousted Prime Minister Stefan Löfven with a no-confidence vote. This was the first time in Swedish history a Prime Minister was ousted by a no-confidence vote. The vote was called on 17 June by the Sweden Democrats after the Left Party withdrew support for Löfven over a rent control reform, which was an important issue for many voters.

After a week in which he had to decide either to resign or declare a snap election, Löfven chose to resign on 28 June, meaning that the Speaker of the Riksdag Andreas Norlén was tasked to find a Prime Minister the Riksdag could tolerate. In the meantime, Löfven remained as Prime Minister but only as part of a caretaker government. On 7 July, Löfven was re-elected by the Riksdag, as 173 MPs voted against him out of the 175 necessary for a candidate to fail such a vote. The Löfven III cabinet was officially formed and installed on 9 July.

The 2021 government crisis was the second government crisis suffered by a Löfven cabinet. After winning the 2014 Swedish general election, the Löfven I cabinet's government budget was rejected by the Riksdag, causing a government crisis that lasted for nearly a month.

== Background ==
After the 2018 Swedish general election, the Social Democrats together with the Green Party joined with Centre Party and Liberals to form the January Agreement (Swedish: Januariavtalet). This agreement gained passive support from the Left Party who were excluded from the agreement. The agreement stated that the Social Democrats and Green Party would form the government with the support from the Centre Party and Liberals who would have some of their political programme adopted by the government. The January Agreement consisted of 73 points ranging from immigration policy to housing policy. The Left Party were heavily against two points in the agreement, a proposal to reform the Employment Protection Act, and another point which would introduce market rents (i.e. the end of rent control) for newly built residential developments, the latter of which was the main cause to the uprising of the government crisis. Both of these points were conditions of the Centre Party and Liberals during the negotiations, rather than Social Democratic or Green Party policy. As early as 2018, the then party leader of the Left Party, Jonas Sjöstedt said that they would not hesitate to declare a no-confidence vote against the government if they were to introduce a bill on market rents, and this threat was repeated when voting to make Löfven Prime Minister.

On 8 June 2021, the report of the government's commission on removing rent controls on new-build apartments was concluded and delivered to the government. On 15 June, the Left Party leader Nooshi Dadgostar called a press conference and gave the government a 48-hour ultimatum to scrap the proposed law. On 17 June, the government had not said a word and Dadgostar announced that they no longer had confidence in the government. Jimmie Åkesson, the party leader of the Sweden Democrats, gave his support to Dadgostar, and shortly thereafter a vote was called by the Sweden Democrats to the Speaker of the Riksdag. Both leaders of opposition parties the Moderate Party and the Christian Democrats announced that they also had no confidence in the sitting government. This meant that there was a majority in the Riksdag that had no confidence in Löfven, and a successful no-confidence vote was imminent.

== Vote ==
The no-confidence vote took place on 21 June, and Löfven was ousted by a majority of the Riksdag. Because of the COVID-19 pandemic in Sweden only 55 members of the Riksdag were allowed to partake in a vote in the chamber. According to the Basic Laws of Sweden, there had to be at least 175 yes-votes from the members of the parliament for a Prime Minister to be ousted. Because of this, the "55-rule" was not applied for this vote and all 349 members of the Riksdag had to be present for the vote, unless symptoms of COVID-19 were present at the time. The decision to have all 349 members present was criticized by Swedish media personalities who meant this vote could become a superspreading event of COVID-19. Some members of parliament were hesitant to the decision and called it "unpleasant" and "uncomfortable" that there was a slight risk of sick people not staying home during the vote. Prior to the vote, the Speaker of the Riksdag called in the Parliamentary leaders of every party to discuss how the vote would take place. Johan Carlson, director general of the Public Health Agency of Sweden, said that the strategy that was put forward was well thought-out and reasonable for the occasion.

The Riksdag previously had a recommendation in place on wearing face masks in the building; however, this recommendation was abolished on 14 June and put into effect on 18 June. For the vote on 21 June, the recommendation was put into place once again temporarily.

The vote took place on 21 June at 10:00 (CEST), and a majority of the members of parliament voted yes to oust Löfven. This was the first time that a Prime Minister lost a vote of confidence in the Riksdag. This gave Löfven a week to resign or declare a snap election.

21 June 2021 vote in the Riksdag
Party	Votes for	Votes against	Abstained	Absent (did not vote)
Social Democrats	0	94: Ann-Christin Ahlberg; Daniel Andersson; Johan Andersson; Denis Begic; Hannah Bergstedt; Patrik Björck; Heléne Björklund; Yasmine Bladelius; Marlene Burwick; ClasGöran Carlsson; Gunilla Carlsson; Teresa Carvalho; Mikael Dahlqvist; Adnan Dibrani; Hans Ekström; Jamal El-Haj; Patrik Engström; Åsa Eriksson; Erik Ezelius; Kenneth G Forslund; Isak From; Roza Güclü Hedin; Elin Gustafsson; Monica Haider; Abraham Halef; Thomas Hammarberg; Johanna Haraldsson; Jörgen Hellman; Caroline Helmersson Olsson; Hans Hoff; Paula Holmqvist; Per-Arne Håkansson; Anna Johansson; Mattias Jonsson; Joakim Järrebring; Ida Karkiainen; Annelie Karlsson; Niklas Karlsson; Åsa Karlsson; Sultan Kayhan; Tomas Kronståhl; Serkan Köse; Diana Laitinen Carlsson; Gustaf Lantz; Hillevi Larsson; Lars Mejern Larsson; Malin Larsson; Rikard Larsson; Sanne Lennström; Teres Lindberg; Åsa Lindestam; Eva Lindh; Elin Lundgren; Fredrik Lundh Sammeli; Patrik Lundqvist; Petter Löberg; Johan Löfstrand; Magnus Manhammar; Ola Möller; Laila Naraghi; Pyry Niemi; Ingemar Nilsson; Kristina Nilsson; Pia Nilsson; Ingela Nylund Watz; Leif Nysmed; Carina Ohlsson; Solange Olame Bayibsa; Kalle Olsson; Jasenko Omanovic; Mattias Ottosson; Björn Petersson; Helén Pettersson; Marianne Pettersson; Lawen Redar; Azadeh Rojhan Gustafsson; Lena Rådström Baastad; Joakim Sandell; Markus Selin; Linus Sköld; Annika Strandhäll; Maria Strömkvist; Inge Ståhlgren; Gunilla Svantorp; Anna-Caren Sätherberg; Mathias Tegnér; Olle Thorell; Mattias Vepsä; Anna Vikström; Anna Wallentheim; Hanna Westerén; Åsa Westlund; Björn Wiechel; Mats Wiking	0	6: Johan Büser; Aylin Fazelian; Sara Heikkinen Breitholtz; Dag Larsson; Carina Ödebrink; Anders Österberg
Moderate Party	70: Ann-Sofie Alm; Jan R. Andersson; Alexandra Anstrell; Helena Antoni; Kristina Axén Olin; Hanif Bali; Lars Beckman; Sten Bergheden; Jörgen Berglund; Tobias Billström; Elisabeth Björnsdotter Rahm; Carl-Oskar Bohlin; Helena Bouveng; Katarina Brännström; Margareta Cederfelt; Åsa Coenraads; Mikael Damsgaard; Ida Drougge; Annicka Engblom; Karin Enström; Jan Ericson; Johan Forssell; Mats Green; Ann-Charlotte Hammar Johnsson; Anders Hansson; Ulrika Heindorff; Lars Hjälmered; Johan Hultberg; Marie-Louise Hänel Sandström; Kjell Jansson; Lars Jilmstad; Pål Jonson; David Josefsson; Ellen Juntti; Ulrika Jörgensen; Arin Karapet; Mattias Karlsson (i Luleå); Ulrika Karlsson; Ulf Kristersson; Ann-Sofie Lifvenhage; Marléne Lund Kopparklint; Betty Malmberg; Maria Malmer Stenergard; Josefin Malmqvist; Noria Manouchi; Louise Meijer; Lotta Olsson; Erik Ottoson; Lars Püss; Saila Quicklund; Edward Riedl; Jessica Rosencrantz; Jessika Roswall; Hans Rothenberg; Magdalena Schröder; Fredrik Schulte; Maria Stockhaus; Magnus Stuart; Elisabeth Svantesson; Cecilie Tenfjord Toftby; Hans Wallmark; Camilla Waltersson Grönvall; John Weinerhall; Sofia Westergren; Cecilia Widegren; John Widegren; Niklas Wykman; Viktor Wärnick; Boriana Åberg; Ann-Britt Åsebol	0	0	0
Sweden Democrats	62: Jonas Andersson i Linghem; Jonas Andersson i Skellefteå; Lars Andersson; Tobias Andersson; Clara Aranda; Ludvig Aspling; Angelika Bengtsson; Bo Broman; Mattias Bäckström Johansson; Alexander Christiansson; Dennis Dioukarev; Staffan Eklöf; Aron Emilsson; Matheus Enholm; Yasmine Eriksson; Mikael Eskilandersson; Runar Filper; Josef Fransson; Ann-Christine From Utterstedt; Sara Gille; Jörgen Grubb; Roger Hedlund; Ebba Hermansson; Richard Jomshof; Patrik Jönsson; Mattias Karlsson (i Norrhult); Martin Kinnunen; Julia Kronlid; Fredrik Lindahl; Linda Lindberg; Angelica Lundberg; David Lång; Adam Marttinen; Thomas Morell; Mats Nordberg; Caroline Nordengrip; Katja Nyberg; Anne Oskarsson; Eric Palmqvist; David Perez; Magnus Persson; Charlotte Quensel; Per Ramhorn; Patrick Reslow; Roger Richthoff; Michael Rubbestad; Oscar Sjöstedt; Johnny Skalin; Robert Stenkvist; Mikael Strandman; Carina Ståhl Herrstedt; Jimmy Ståhl; Cassandra Sundin; Sven-Olof Sällström; Björn Söder; Per Söderlund; Henrik Vinge; Eric Westroth; Markus Wiechel; Jennie Åfeldt; Jimmie Åkesson; Christina Östberg	0	0	0
Centre Party	0	0	30: Alireza Akhondi; Daniel Bäckström; Jonny Cato; Fredrik Christensson; Catarina Deremar; Magnus Ek; Johan Hedin; Ulrika Heie; Peter Helander; Martina Johansson; Ola Johansson; Anders W. Jonsson; Johanna Jönsson; Emil Källström; Mikael Larsson; Helena Lindahl; Per Lodenius; Kerstin Lundgren; Annie Lööf; Linda Modig; Sofia Nilsson; Rickard Nordin; Niels Paarup-Petersen; Annika Qarlsson; Per Schöldberg; Helena Vilhelmsson; Kristina Yngwe; Martin Ådahl; Anders Åkesson; Per Åsling	1: Lars Thomsson
Left Party	27: Ulla Andersson; Nooshi Dadgostar; Lorena Delgado Varas; Ali Esbati; Ida Gabrielsson; Hanna Gunnarsson; Tony Haddou; Jens Holm; Christina Höj Larsen; Momodou Malcolm Jallow; Lotta Johnsson Fornarve; Maj Karlsson; Birger Lahti; Gudrun Nordborg; Yasmine Posio; Daniel Riazat; Karin Rågsjö; Elin Segerlind; Håkan Svenneling; Mia Sydow Mölleby; Ilona Szatmari Waldau; Jon Thorbjörnson; Jessica Thunander; Vasiliki Tsouplaki; Ciczie Weidby; Linda Westerlund Snecker; Jessica Wetterling	0	0	0
Christian Democrats	22: Lars Adaktusson; Michael Anefur; Acko Ankarberg Johansson; Camilla Brodin; Gudrun Brunegård; Ebba Busch; Andreas Carlson; Christian Carlsson; Sofia Damm; Hans Eklind; Jakob Forssmed; Hampus Hagman; Robert Halef; Magnus Jacobsson; Ingemar Kihlström; Magnus Oscarsson; Mikael Oscarsson; Kjell-Arne Ottosson; Tuve Skånberg; Pia Steensland; Larry Söder; Roland Utbult	0	0	0
Liberals	0	0	19: Tina Acketoft; Gulan Avci; Juno Blom; Malin Danielsson; Bengt Eliasson; Joar Forssell; Helena Gellerman; Roger Haddad; Robert Hannah; Nina Lundström; Fredrik Malm; Maria Nilsson; Lina Nordquist; Christer Nylander; Johan Pehrson; Mats Persson; Arman Teimouri; Barbro Westerholm; Allan Widman	0
Green Party	0	15: Leila Ali-Elmi; Nicklas Attefjord; Emma Berginger; Mats Berglund; Elisabeth Falkhaven; Maria Gardfjell; Camilla Hansén; Annika Hirvonen; Emma Hult; Rasmus Ling; Amanda Palmstierna; Anna Sibinska; Karolina Skog; Pernilla Stålhammar; Lorentz Tovatt	0	1: Rebecka Le Moine
Independent	0	0	2: Emma Carlsson Löfdahl; Amineh Kakabaveh	0
Total	181	109	51	8

== Aftermath ==
Annie Lööf, leader of the Centre Party, announced on 23 June 2021 that the party was abandoning point 44, rent control reforms, which would introduce market rents on newly built apartments. The Liberals, who previously stated they were going to support a new liberal government, declined any further talks with the Centre Party revolving the January agreement. With the Liberals leaving the basis for Löfven's government, the remaining basis of S, C, V, and MP together only held 174 seats – one seat short of a majority. Stefan Löfven's only hope to stay as Prime Minister therefore laid in the hands of the two independent politicians in the Riksdag: Emma Carlsson Löfdahl (formerly a member of the Liberals) and Amineh Kakabaveh (formerly a member of the Left Party). At least one of them had to vote for Löfven as Prime Minister, or abstain, in the next Riksdag vote in order for him to retain the premiership. It could also be decisive if one or more party-affiliated members of the Riksdag voted against their party line.

During a press conference on 28 June, Löfven announced that he would resign, meaning that the Speaker of the Riksdag Andreas Norlén would start the process of finding a Prime Minister whom the Riksdag could approve. In the meantime Löfven remained PM but only as part of a caretaker government.

=== Government formation talks and re-election of Löfven ===
Speaker Andreas Norlén started government formation talks with the party leaders on 29 June. In the afternoon, Moderate Party leader Ulf Kristersson was formally tasked with forming a government and given three days. On 1 July, Kristersson informed the Speaker that there was not enough support in parliament for his proposed government constellation, one consisting of his own Moderate Party, the Christian Democrats, the Sweden Democrats, and the Liberals. The same day, the Speaker gave Stefan Löfven until 5 July to find an acceptable government coalition. The Speaker can propose a prime ministerial candidate four times before a snap election is automatically called.

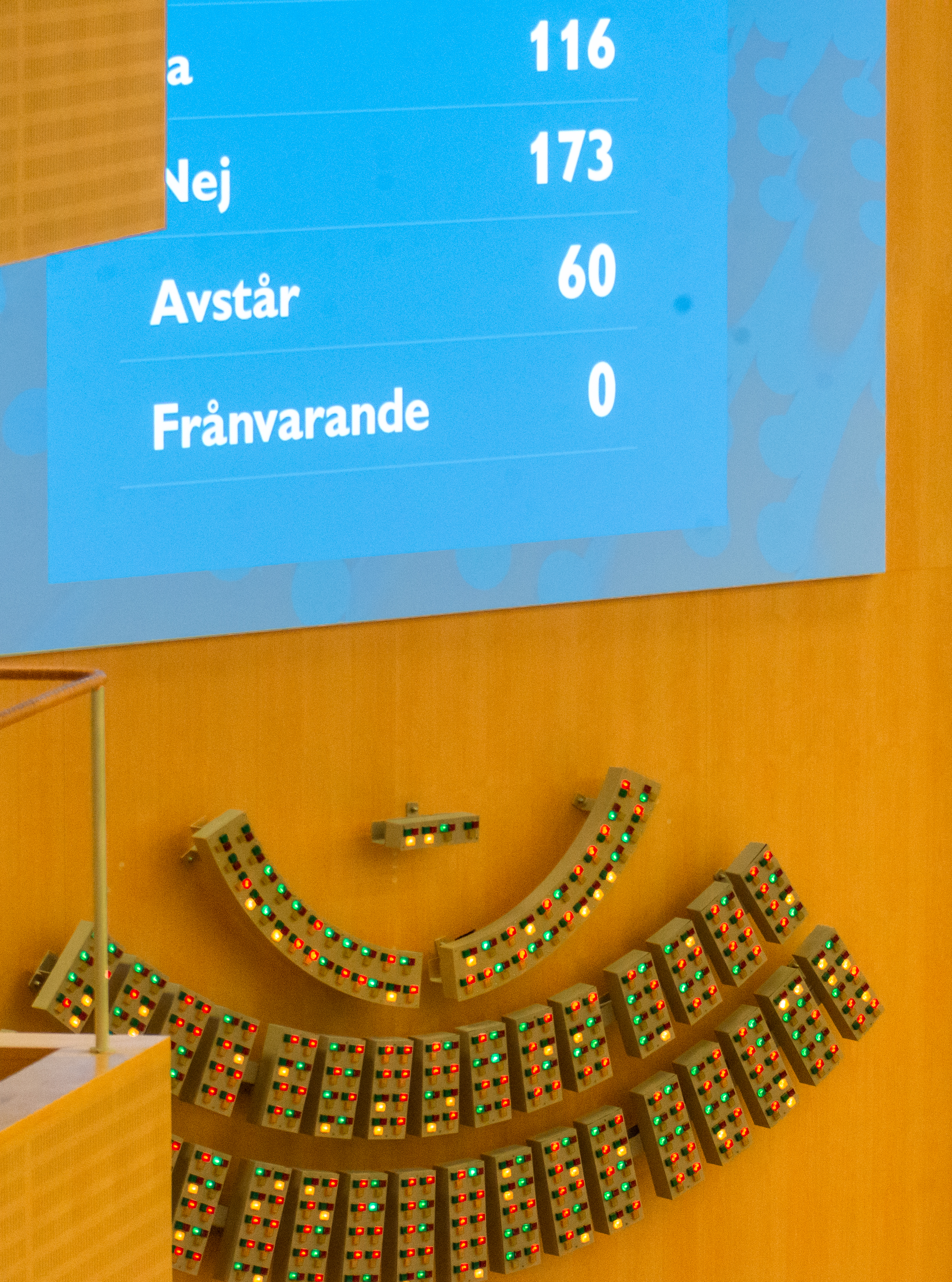
Prime Minister Stefan Löfven is re-elected in the Riksdag on 7 July 2021.

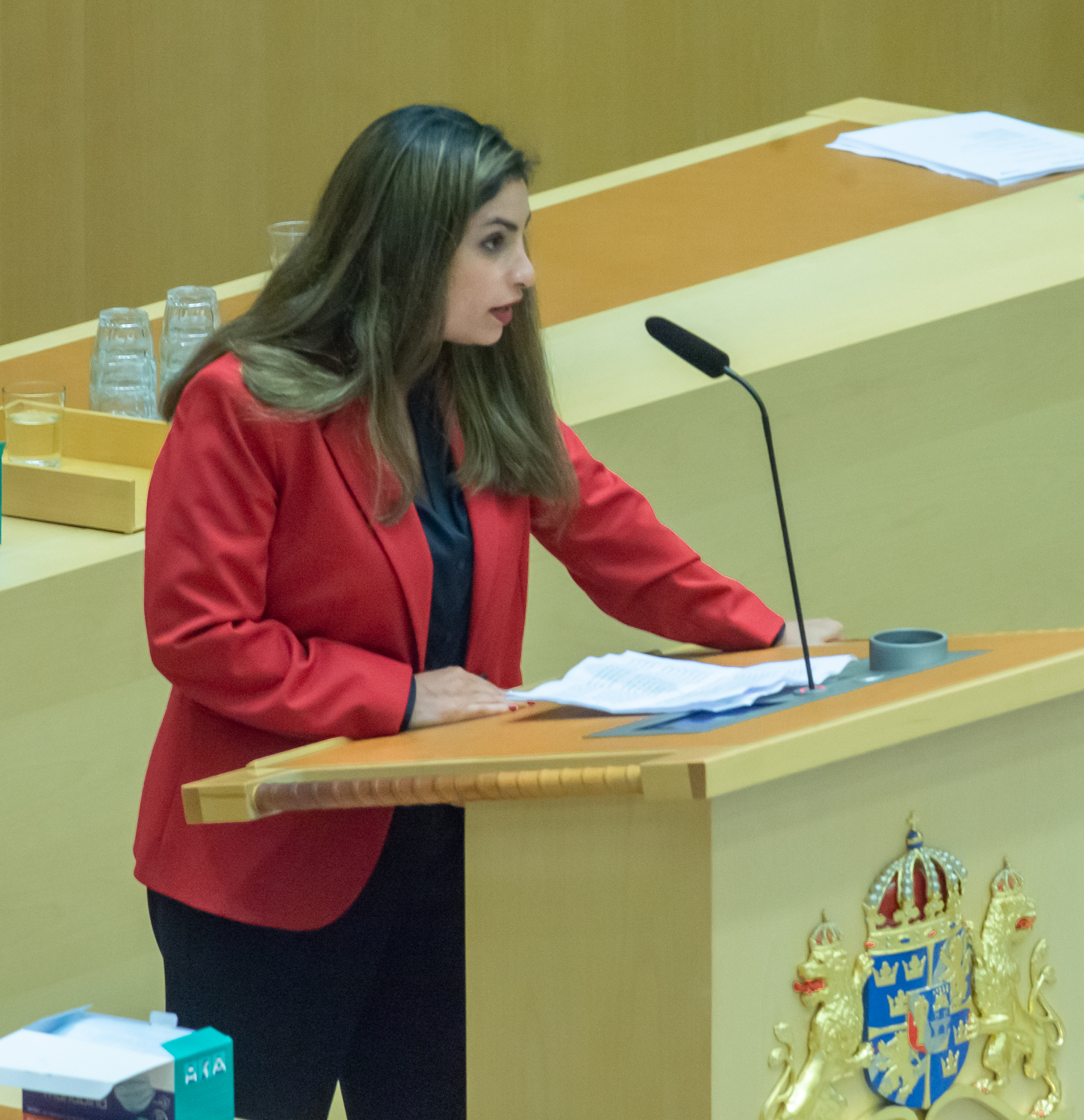
Left Party leader Nooshi Dadgostar speaking in the Riksdag on the day of Löfven's re-election, 7 July 2021

On 7 July, Stefan Löfven was re-elected by the Riksdag, 173 MPs voted against him out of the 175 necessary for a candidate to fail such a vote. Löfven's third government was officially formed on 9 July.

7 July 2021 vote in the Riksdag
Party	Votes for	Votes against	Abstained
Social Democrats	100: Ann-Christin Ahlberg; Daniel Andersson; Johan Andersson; Denis Begic; Hannah Bergstedt; Patrik Björck; Heléne Björklund; Yasmine Bladelius; Marlene Burwick; Johan Büser; ClasGöran Carlsson; Gunilla Carlsson; Teresa Carvalho; Mikael Dahlqvist; Adnan Dibrani; Hans Ekström; Jamal El-Haj; Patrik Engström; Åsa Eriksson; Erik Ezelius; Kenneth G Forslund; Isak From; Marianne Fundahn; Roza Güclü Hedin; Elin Gustafsson; Monica Haider; Abraham Halef; Thomas Hammarberg; Johanna Haraldsson; Jörgen Hellman; Caroline Helmersson Olsson; Hans Hoff; Paula Holmqvist; Per-Arne Håkansson; Anna Johansson; Mattias Jonsson; Joakim Järrebring; Ida Karkiainen; Annelie Karlsson; Niklas Karlsson; Åsa Karlsson; Sultan Kayhan; Tomas Kronståhl; Serkan Köse; Diana Laitinen Carlsson; Gustaf Lantz; Dag Larsson; Hillevi Larsson; Lars Mejern Larsson; Malin Larsson; Rikard Larsson; Sanne Lennström; Teres Lindberg; Åsa Lindestam; Eva Lindh; Elin Lundgren; Fredrik Lundh Sammeli; Patrik Lundqvist; Petter Löberg; Johan Löfstrand; Magnus Manhammar; Ola Möller; Laila Naraghi; Pyry Niemi; Ingemar Nilsson; Jennie Nilsson; Kristina Nilsson; Pia Nilsson; Ingela Nylund Watz; Leif Nysmed; Carina Ohlsson; Solange Olame Bayibsa; Kalle Olsson; Jasenko Omanovic; Mattias Ottosson; Björn Petersson; Helén Pettersson; Lawen Redar; Azadeh Rojhan Gustafsson; Lena Rådström Baastad; Joakim Sandell; Markus Selin; Linus Sköld; Annika Strandhäll; Maria Strömkvist; Inge Ståhlgren; Gunilla Svantorp; Anna-Caren Sätherberg; Mathias Tegnér; Olle Thorell; Mattias Vepsä; Anna Vikström; Anna Wallentheim; Hanna Westerén; Åsa Westlund; Björn Wiechel; Mats Wiking; Carina Ödebrink; Paula Örn; Anders Österberg	0	0
Moderate Party	0	70: Ann-Sofie Alm; Jan R. Andersson; Alexandra Anstrell; Helena Antoni; Kristina Axén Olin; Hanif Bali; Lars Beckman; Sten Bergheden; Jörgen Berglund; Tobias Billström; Elisabeth Björnsdotter Rahm; Carl-Oskar Bohlin; Helena Bouveng; Katarina Brännström; Margareta Cederfelt; Åsa Coenraads; Mikael Damsgaard; Ida Drougge; Annicka Engblom; Karin Enström; Jan Ericson; Johan Forssell; Mats Green; Ann-Charlotte Hammar Johnsson; Anders Hansson; Ulrika Heindorff; Lars Hjälmered; Johan Hultberg; Marie-Louise Hänel Sandström; Kjell Jansson; Lars Jilmstad; Pål Jonson; David Josefsson; Ellen Juntti; Ulrika Jörgensen; Arin Karapet; Mattias Karlsson (i Luleå); Ulrika Karlsson; Ulf Kristersson; Ann-Sofie Lifvenhage; Marléne Lund Kopparklint; Betty Malmberg; Maria Malmer Stenergard; Josefin Malmqvist; Noria Manouchi; Louise Meijer; Lotta Olsson; Erik Ottoson; Lars Püss; Saila Quicklund; Edward Riedl; Jessica Rosencrantz; Jessika Roswall; Hans Rothenberg; Magdalena Schröder; Fredrik Schulte; Maria Stockhaus; Magnus Stuart; Elisabeth Svantesson; Cecilie Tenfjord Toftby; Hans Wallmark; Camilla Waltersson Grönvall; John Weinerhall; Sofia Westergren; Cecilia Widegren; John Widegren; Niklas Wykman; Viktor Wärnick; Boriana Åberg; Ann-Britt Åsebol	0
Sweden Democrats	0	62: Jonas Andersson i Linghem; Jonas Andersson i Skellefteå; Lars Andersson; Tobias Andersson; Clara Aranda; Ludvig Aspling; Angelika Bengtsson; Bo Broman; Mattias Bäckström Johansson; Alexander Christiansson; Dennis Dioukarev; Staffan Eklöf; Aron Emilsson; Matheus Enholm; Yasmine Eriksson; Mikael Eskilandersson; Runar Filper; Josef Fransson; Ann-Christine From Utterstedt; Sara Gille; Jörgen Grubb; Roger Hedlund; Ebba Hermansson; Richard Jomshof; Patrik Jönsson; Mattias Karlsson (i Norrhult); Martin Kinnunen; Julia Kronlid; Fredrik Lindahl; Linda Lindberg; Angelica Lundberg; David Lång; Adam Marttinen; Thomas Morell; Mats Nordberg; Caroline Nordengrip; Katja Nyberg; Anne Oskarsson; Eric Palmqvist; David Perez; Magnus Persson; Charlotte Quensel; Per Ramhorn; Patrick Reslow; Roger Richthoff; Michael Rubbestad; Oscar Sjöstedt; Johnny Skalin; Robert Stenkvist; Mikael Strandman; Carina Ståhl Herrstedt; Jimmy Ståhl; Cassandra Sundin; Sven-Olof Sällström; Björn Söder; Per Söderlund; Henrik Vinge; Eric Westroth; Markus Wiechel; Jennie Åfeldt; Jimmie Åkesson; Christina Östberg	0
Centre Party	0	0	31: Alireza Akhondi; Daniel Bäckström; Jonny Cato; Fredrik Christensson; Catarina Deremar; Magnus Ek; Johan Hedin; Ulrika Heie; Peter Helander; Martina Johansson; Ola Johansson; Anders W. Jonsson; Johanna Jönsson; Emil Källström; Mikael Larsson; Helena Lindahl; Per Lodenius; Kerstin Lundgren; Annie Lööf; Linda Modig; Sofia Nilsson; Rickard Nordin; Niels Paarup-Petersen; Annika Qarlsson; Per Schöldberg; Lars Thomsson; Helena Vilhelmsson; Kristina Yngwe; Martin Ådahl; Anders Åkesson; Per Åsling
Left Party	0	0	27: Ulla Andersson; Nooshi Dadgostar; Lorena Delgado Varas; Ali Esbati; Ida Gabrielsson; Hanna Gunnarsson; Tony Haddou; Jens Holm; Christina Höj Larsen; Momodou Malcolm Jallow; Lotta Johnsson Fornarve; Maj Karlsson; Birger Lahti; Gudrun Nordborg; Yasmine Posio; Daniel Riazat; Karin Rågsjö; Elin Segerlind; Håkan Svenneling; Mia Sydow Mölleby; Ilona Szatmari Waldau; Jon Thorbjörnson; Jessica Thunander; Vasiliki Tsouplaki; Ciczie Weidby; Linda Westerlund Snecker; Jessica Wetterling
Christian Democrats	0	22: Lars Adaktusson; Michael Anefur; Acko Ankarberg Johansson; Camilla Brodin; Gudrun Brunegård; Ebba Busch; Andreas Carlson; Christian Carlsson; Sofia Damm; Hans Eklind; Jakob Forssmed; Hampus Hagman; Robert Halef; Magnus Jacobsson; Ingemar Kihlström; Magnus Oscarsson; Mikael Oscarsson; Kjell-Arne Ottosson; Tuve Skånberg; Pia Steensland; Larry Söder; Roland Utbult	0
Liberals	0	18: Tina Acketoft; Gulan Avci; Juno Blom; Malin Danielsson; Bengt Eliasson; Joar Forssell; Helena Gellerman; Roger Haddad; Robert Hannah; Fredrik Malm; Maria Nilsson; Lina Nordquist; Christer Nylander; Johan Pehrson; Mats Persson; Arman Teimouri; Barbro Westerholm; Allan Widman	1: Nina Lundström
Green Party	16: Leila Ali-Elmi; Nicklas Attefjord; Emma Berginger; Mats Berglund; Elisabeth Falkhaven; Maria Gardfjell; Camilla Hansén; Annika Hirvonen; Emma Hult; Rebecka Le Moine; Rasmus Ling; Amanda Palmstierna; Anna Sibinska; Karolina Skog; Pernilla Stålhammar; Lorentz Tovatt	0	0
Independent	0	1: Emma Carlsson Löfdahl	1: Amineh Kakabaveh
Total	116	173	60

== See also ==
- 2014 Swedish government crisis
- 2021 Swedish government formation
