= Anders Österberg =

Swedish politician (born 1981)

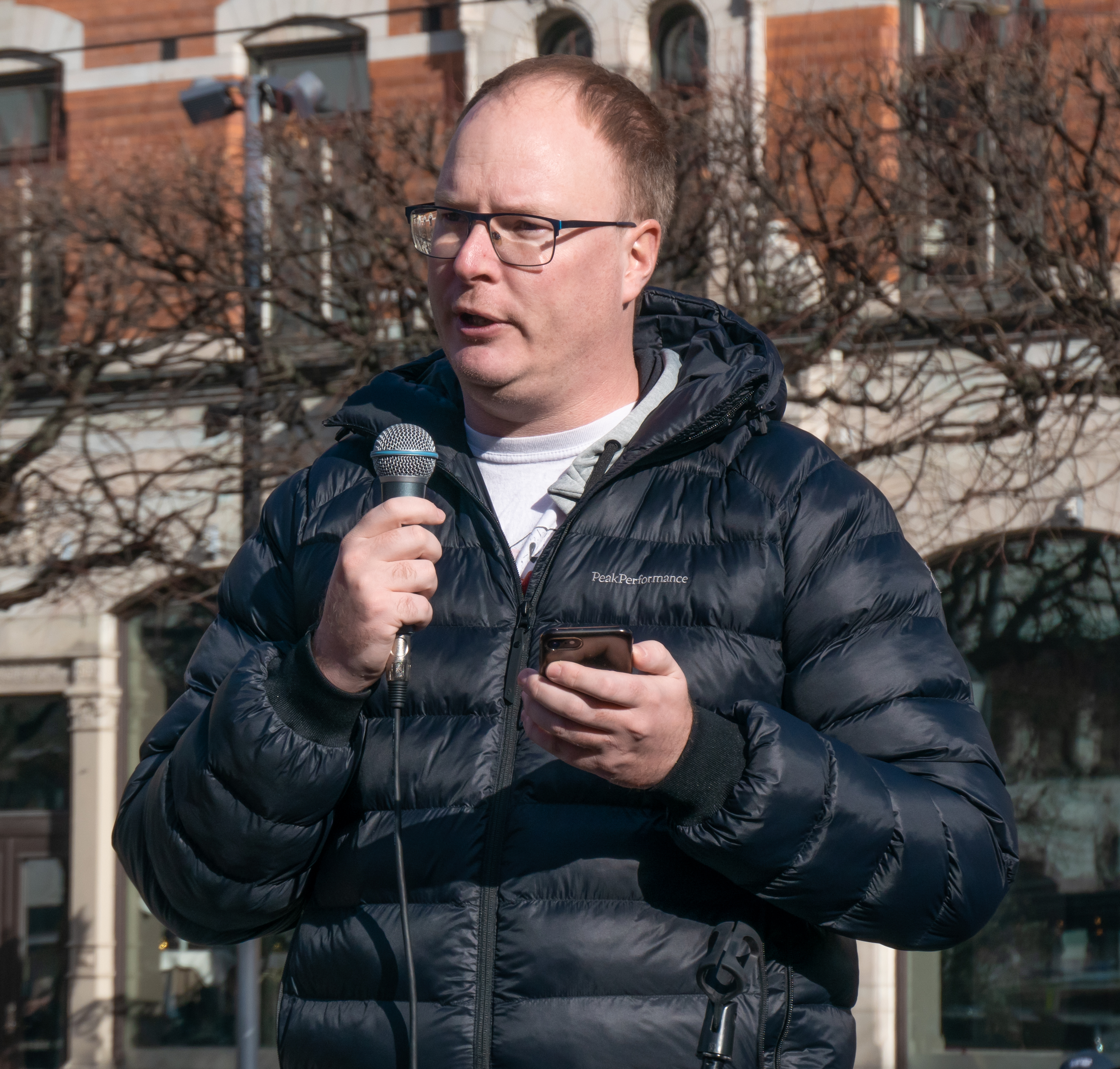
- Österberg in March 2022

Member of the Riksdag
- In office 24 September 2018 – 26 September 2022
- Constituency: Stockholm Municipality

Personal details
- Born: Anders Henrik Mikael Österberg; 1981 (age 44–45)
- Party: Social Democratic Party
- Education: University of Gothenburg

Anders Henrik Mikael Österberg (born 1981) is a Swedish politician and former member of the Riksdag, the national legislature. A member of the Social Democratic Party, he represented Stockholm Municipality between September 2018 and September 2022. He had previously been a substitute member of the Riksdag four times: October 2015 to May 2017 (for Ylva Johansson); May 2017 to July 2017 (for Anders Ygeman); July 2017 to September 2017 (for Arhe Hamednaca); and September 2017 to September 2018 (for Stefan Löfven).

Österberg is the son of bus driver Bo Österberg and workplace mediator Gunnel Larsson. He was educated at the Bäckängsgymnasiet school in Borås and has a teaching degree from the University of Gothenburg. He was a preschool teacher in Husby. He is a member of the municipal council in Stockholm Municipality.
