= Hakkı Emre Yunt =

Turkish diplomat (born 1962)

Hakkı Emre Yunt (born 5 May 1962, Ankara) is a Turkish diplomat and the current Turkish ambassador to Sweden.

== Education ==
He studied in the Department of Public Administration of the Middle East Technical University from where he graduated in 1985. Following he absolved his military service between July 1986 and March 1987.

== Diplomatic career ==
Between 1988 and 1999 he was assigned to several positions in Turkish consulates and embassies in Chicago, Tehran and Washington. Between 2001 and 2005 he was assigned to the Embassy of Beijing. From 2005 he was assigned to the diplomatic relations between Turkey and the European Union, eventually becoming Head of Department of the Turkish Accession to the European Union in 2006. In 2009 he became the Turkish ambassador to Doha, Qatar, a position he held until 2013. In 2017 he became the Turkish ambassador to Sweden.

In 2019, he opposed Peter Handke, a known supporter of Slobodan Milošević, being awarded the Nobel Prize in Literature, and decided not to attend the Nobel Prize ceremony that year.

In May 2022 Sweden applied to become a member of NATO and the Turkish President Recep Tayyip Erdoğan voiced opposition to the aim due to alleged "terrorists" being represented in the Swedish Parliament, Yunt suggested he would be in favour of the extradition of the Swedish MP Amineh Kakabaveh, who is of Kurdish descent, to Turkey. Kakabaveh responded that not she should be extradited to Turkey but the ambassador should be sent back to Turkey. Yunt later said the extradition comments were a misunderstanding as Turkey didn't make such a request.

== Honours ==
In 2013 Yunt was awarded the Sash of Merit from Qatar.
