= Johan Andersson (politician) =

Swedish politician (born 1961)

Johan Andersson S
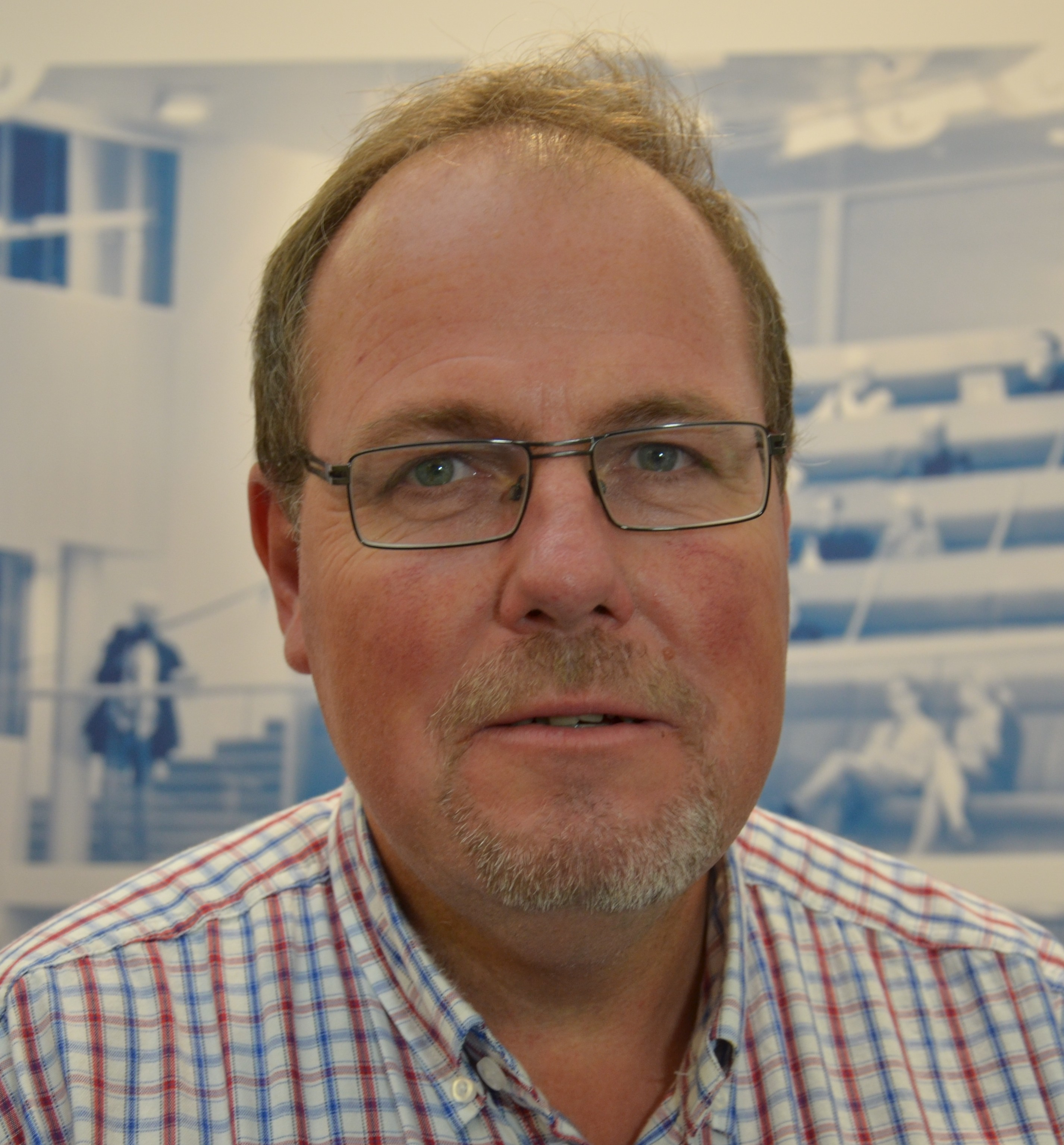
- Andersson at the Gothenburg Book Fair in 2012.

Member of the Swedish Parliament for Östergötland County
- Incumbent
- Assumed office 4 October 2010

Personal details
- Born: 8 December 1961 (age 64) Motala, Motala Municipality, Östergötland County, Sweden
- Party: Swedish Social Democratic Party
- Parents: Sture Andersson; Dagmar Waller-Andersson (née Waller)
- Profession: Politician, unlicensed assistive personnel

Ernst Johan Andersson (born 8 December 1961) is a Swedish politician and member of the Riksdag for the Swedish Social Democratic Party. He holds seat number 32 in the Riksdag representing the constituency of Östergötland County.

== Work in the Riksdag ==
Andersson was elected into the Riksdag after the 2010 general election, he joined the Committee on the Labour Market the same year, he left the committee after the 2014 general election to become a member of the Committee on Transport and Communications, he served in the committee until the 2018 general election when he rejoined the Committee on the Labour Market. He is also a member of the election committee (Valberedning) since September 2018. He has also been an alternate for several parliamentary committees notably the Committee on Transport and Communications, and the Committee on Education.
