= Committee on Transport and Communications =

Swedish parliamentary committee

The (Parliamentary) Committee on Transport and Communications (Swedish: Trafikutskottet, TU) is a parliamentary committee in the Swedish Riksdag. The committee areas of responsibility concern roads, railway, the sea and air transport, road traffic safety, mail services, telecommunication, and Information technology (IT) as well as research activities in the field of communication.

The committee's Speaker is Ulrika Heie from the Centre Party, with Thomas Morell as the vice-Speaker from the Sweden Democrats.

== List of speakers for the committee ==
Name	Period	Political party
Kurt Hugosson	1982-1987	Social Democratic Party
Birger Rosqvist	1987–1993	Social Democratic Party
Sven-Gösta Signell	1993–1994	Social Democratic Party
Monica Öhman	1994–2002	Social Democratic Party
Claes Roxbergh	2002–2006	Green Party
Anders Karlsson	2006–2007	Social Democratic Party
Christina Axelsson	2007–2008	Social Democratic Party
Ibrahim Baylan	2008–2009	Social Democratic Party
Lena Hallengren	2009–2010	Social Democratic Party
Anders Ygeman	2010–2014	Social Democratic Party
Karin Svensson Smith	2014–2018	Green Party
Jens Holm	2018–2022	Left Party
Ulrika Heie	2022–	Centre Party

== List of vice-speakers for the committee ==
Name	Period	Political party	Notes
Rolf Clarkson	1979–1994	Moderate Party	
Wiggo Komstedt	1994–1995	Moderate Party	
Per Westerberg	1995–1998	Moderate Party	
Sven Bergström	1998–2002	Centre Party	
Carina Moberg	2002–2006	Social Democratic Party	
Jan-Evert Rådhström	2006–2014	Moderate Party	
Lars Hjälmered	2014	Moderate Party	
Jessica Rosencrantz	2014–2018	Moderate Party	
Anders Åkesson	2018–2022	Centre Party	
Magnus Jacobsson	2019–2022	Christian Democrats	Second vice-Speaker
Teres Lindberg	2020–2022	Social Democratic Party	Third vice-Speaker
Thomas Morell	2022–	Sweden Democrats	
