= Anders Åkesson =

Politician and Member of the parliament of Sweden

Anders Åkesson C
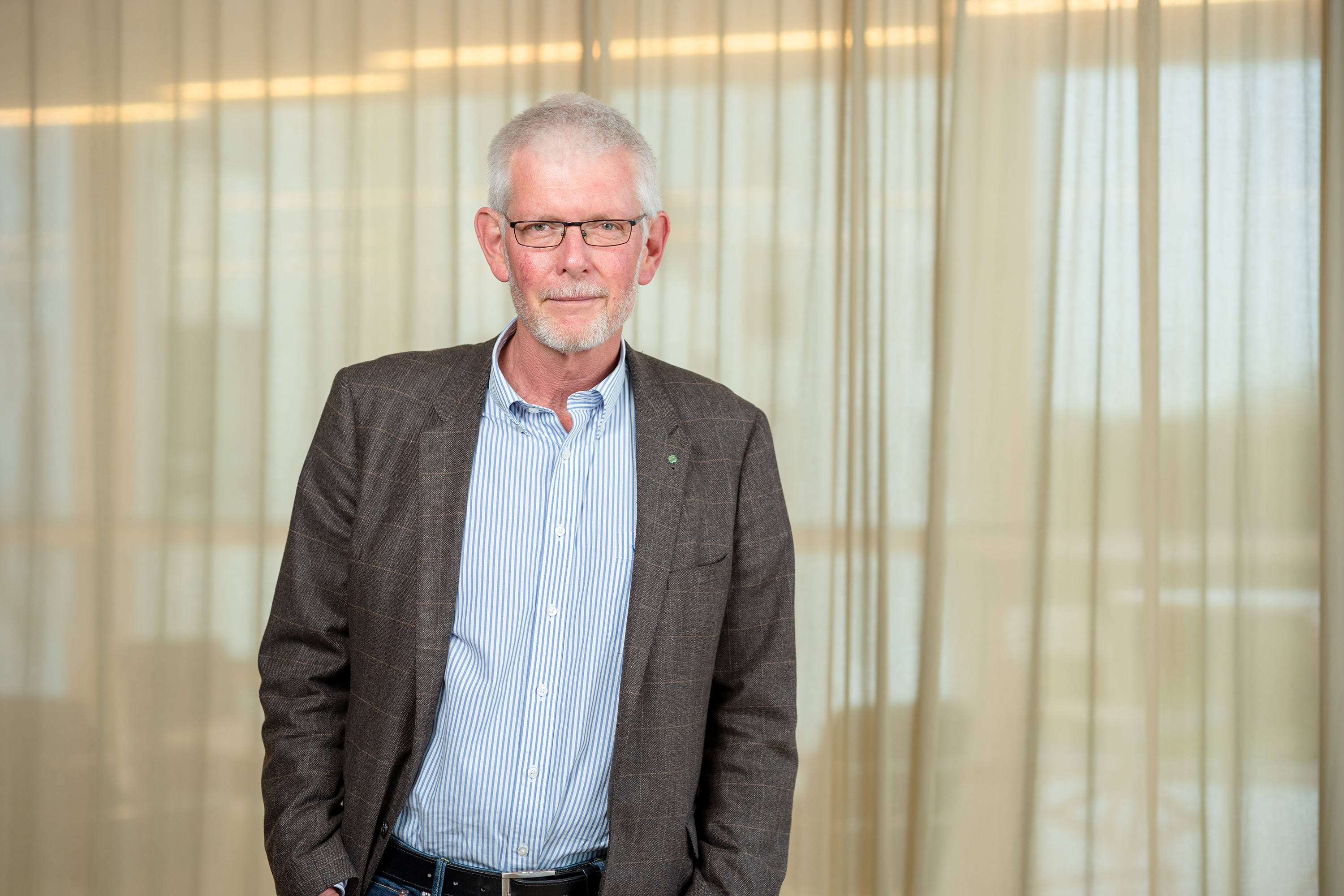
- Åkesson in April 2019

Member of the Swedish Parliament for Kalmar County
- Incumbent
- Assumed office 2 October 2006

Personal details
- Born: 28 November 1958 (age 67)
- Party: Center Party
- Parents: Åke Johansson; Ulla-Britt Johansson (née Karlsson)
- Education: Linnaeus University
- Profession: Politician, teacher

Anders Ingemar Åkesson (born 28 November 1958) is a Swedish politician and member of the Riksdag for the Center Party since 2006. He holds seat number 11 for the constituency of Kalmar County.

Åkesson has been a headteacher for Studieförbundet Vuxenskolan. From 2004 until 2006 he was a spokesperson in the Regional Association of Kalmar County.

As a newly elected member of parliament, he became a member of the Committee on Cultural Affairs in 2006 and an alternate for the Committee on Foreign Affairs. After the 2010 general election he left both committees to join the Committee on Transport and Communications and the War Delegation along with becoming an alternate for the election committee.

On 9 July 2015, Åkesson received attention from mass media after his driver's license had been revoked after multiple incidents of him speeding. After the 2018 general election Åkesson became the vice-Speaker for the Committee on Transport and Communications succeeding Jessica Rosencrantz.

Political offices
Preceded by Jessica Rosencrantz	Vice-Speaker of the Committee on Transport and Communications; 2014–present	Incumbent
