= Mats Persson (politician) =

Swedish politician (born 1980)

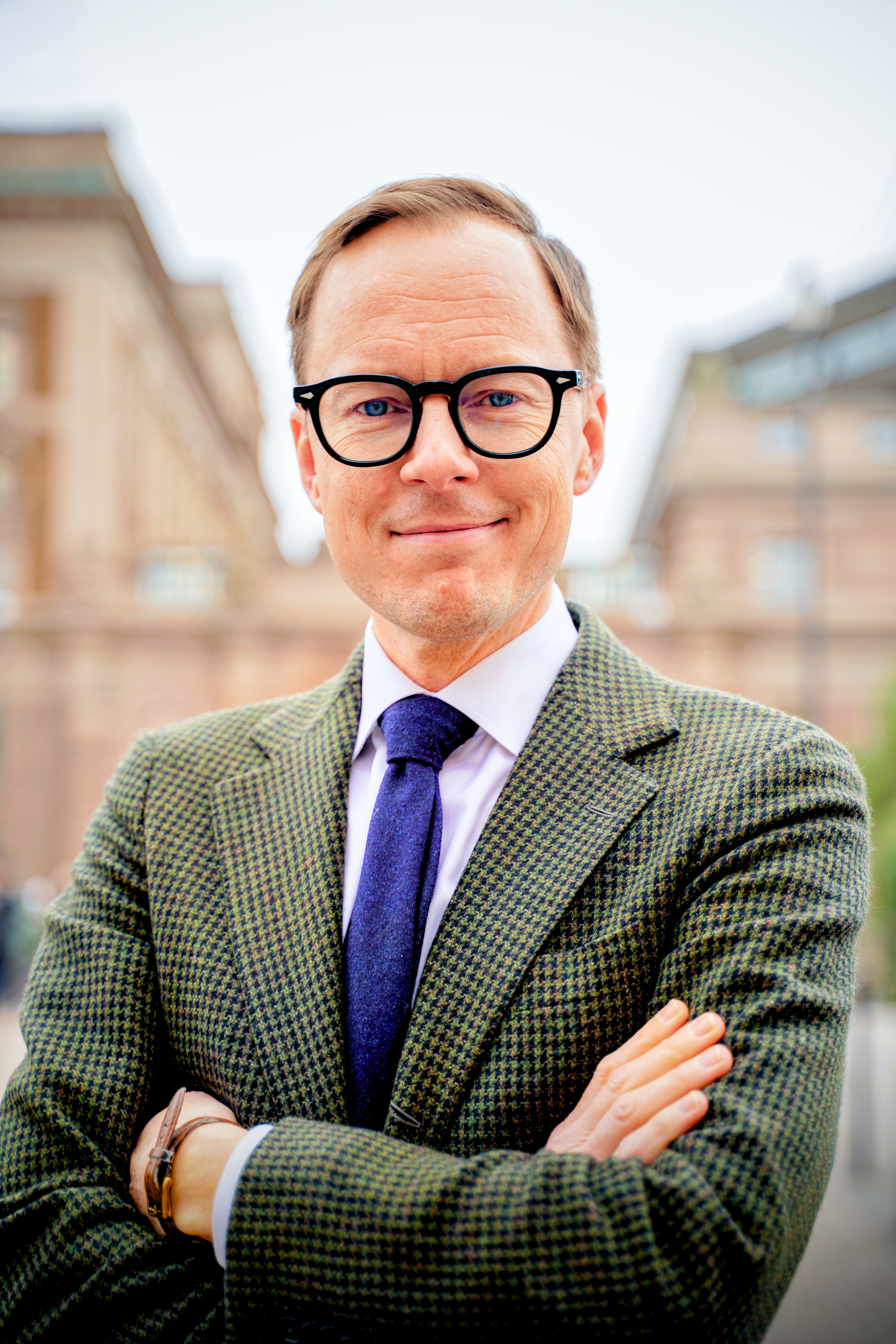
- Mats Persson in 2024

Minister for Employment
- In office 10 September 2024 – 28 June 2025
- Monarch: Carl XVI Gustaf
- Prime Minister: Ulf Kristersson
- Preceded by: Johan Pehrson
- Succeeded by: Johan Britz

Minister for Integration
- In office 10 September 2024 – 28 June 2025
- Monarch: Carl XVI Gustaf
- Prime Minister: Ulf Kristersson
- Preceded by: Johan Pehrson
- Succeeded by: Simona Mohamsson

Minister for Education
- In office 18 October 2022 – 10 September 2024
- Monarch: Carl XVI Gustaf
- Prime Minister: Ulf Kristersson
- Preceded by: Anna Ekström
- Succeeded by: Johan Pehrson

Parliamentary leader of the Liberals
- In office 8 April 2022 – 21 October 2022
- Leader: Johan Pehrson
- Preceded by: Johan Pehrson
- Succeeded by: Lina Nordquist

Member of the Riksdag
- Incumbent
- Assumed office 29 September 2014

Personal details
- Born: Mats Robert Persson; 27 November 1980 (age 45) Markaryd, Sweden
- Party: Liberals
- Education: Lund University
- Occupation: Politician

Mats Robert Persson (born 27 November 1980) is a Swedish politician for the Liberal party. From September 2024 until June 2025 he served as the Minister for Employment and Integration in the Ulf Kristersson Cabinet, having previously served as Minister of Education.

He has been a Member of the Riksdag since 2014, elected for the southern constituency of Skåne County. He was formerly vice-president of the Liberal Youth of Sweden.

Between 2009 and 2014, he was a regional councillor for the Liberals in Region Scania. Persson was elected to the Liberal Party Board in 2011 and was the party's economic policy spokesman from May 2016 to February 2019. He returned to this role in August 2019.

== Biography ==
Persson completed his PhD in economic history at Lund University in 2015 with a thesis on sickness absence and early retirement among immigrants in Sweden during the period of 1981-2003.

=== Member of the Riksdag ===
Persson has been a Member of the Riksdag since the 2014 elections and Liberal parliamentary group leader in the Riksdag since April 2022.

Persson was a member of the Committee on Finance from 2016 to 2019, and has been a member of the Committee again since 2019 after a break. Persson was a member of the Committee on Taxation from 2014 to 2016 and the Committee on Education in 2019. He is or has been an alternate member of the Committee on the Labour Market, the Committee on European Union Affairs, the Committee on Finance, the Committee on Taxation, the Committee on Social Insurance, and the Committee on Transport and Communications, among others.

== Bibliography ==
- 2006 – Statens ofullkomlighet?: kommunal utjämning och invandring - med Malmö som exempel. Lund papers in economic history, 1101-346X; 103 (in Swedish). Lund: Department of Economic History, Lund University. SELIBR 10159756
- 2015 – Persson, Mats. In good times and in bad: immigrants, self-employment and social insurances (avhandling) (PDF). Lund studies in economic history, 1400-4860; 71. Lund: Lund University. ISBN 978-91-87793-15-8. Archived from the original (PDF) on 13 August 2019. SELIBR 18385909
