= Lina Nordquist =

Swedish politician (born 1977)

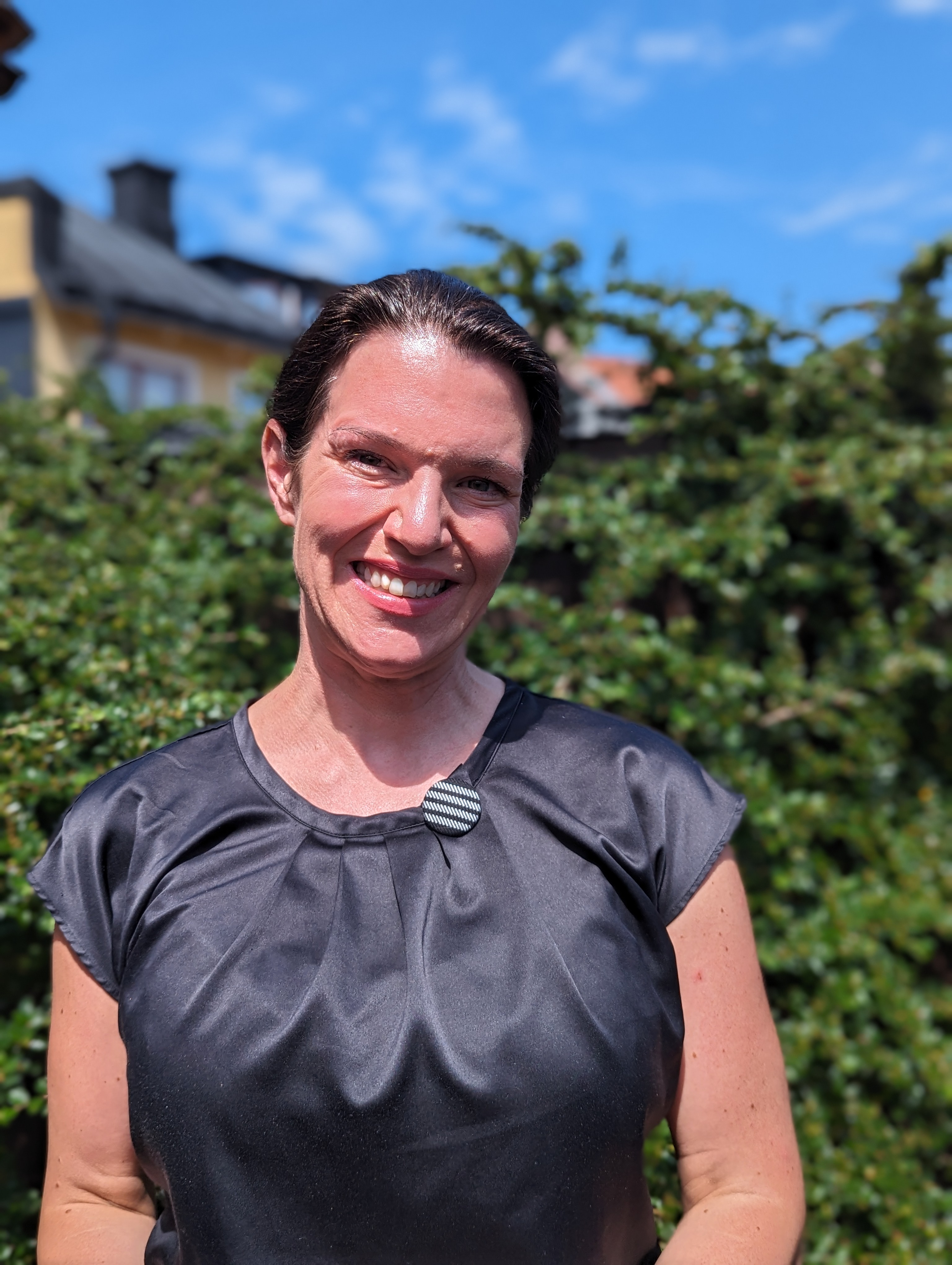
- Lina Nordquist (2023)

Parliamentary group leader of the Liberals
- Incumbent
- Assumed office 20 October 2022
- Preceded by: Mats Persson

Member of the Riksdag
- Incumbent
- Assumed office 24 September 2018
- Constituency: Uppsala County

Personal details
- Born: Lina Maria Nordquist; December 28, 1977 (age 48) Norrala, Sweden
- Party: Liberals
- Spouse: Fredrik Palm
- Children: 2
- Education: Uppsala University
- Profession: Pharmacist, physiologist, politician

Lina Maria Nordquist (born 28 December 1977) is a Swedish politician and physiologist who has served as a member of the Riksdag for the Liberals since 2018. She represents Uppsala County and has served as parliamentary group leader of the Liberals since October 2022.

Nordquist was born in Norrala in Söderhamn Municipality, Gävleborg County. She grew up in Hälsingland and later moved to Uppsala to study pharmacy. She graduated as a pharmacist in 2001 and subsequently pursued academic research at Uppsala University, completing a doctorate in physiology in 2007. She was appointed docent in physiology at Uppsala University in 2011.

Between 2002 and 2007, Nordquist was a doctoral student at Uppsala University and subsequently worked as a researcher and university teacher there until 2013. She also undertook research at Georgetown University in the United States and completed a postdoctoral position at Hokkaido University in Japan. Her research has included blood pressure and diabetes.

Nordquist entered regional politics in Uppsala County and served as a regional councillor from 2013 to 2018. She was elected to the Riksdag in the 2018 Swedish general election and has subsequently been re-elected. During her parliamentary career she has served on several committees, including the Committee on Health and Welfare, and has been a member of the War Delegation.

In October 2022, Nordquist became parliamentary group leader of the Liberals in the Riksdag, succeeding Mats Persson.

== Early life and education ==
Lina Maria Nordquist was born on 28 December 1977 in Norrala, Sweden. Her parents were Hansolof Nordquist, a headteacher, and Berit Nordquist, a language teacher. She attended an upper-secondary natural science programme, graduating in 1996.

She studied at Uppsala University, completing courses in business administration and law before graduating as a pharmacist in 2001. She subsequently completed doctoral studies in physiology, receiving her doctorate in 2007, and was appointed docent in physiology in 2011.

== Career ==
Nordquist worked as a pharmacist for Apoteket AB in 2001 before becoming a doctoral student at Uppsala University in 2002. From 2007 to 2013 she worked as a researcher and university teacher at the university. She also worked as a guest researcher at Georgetown University and as a postdoctoral researcher at Hokkaido University. Nordquist has also served on the boards of several major organisations. She was a member of the Uppsala University university board, the National Board of Health and Welfare's advisory bodies, and the Swedish National Council on Medical Ethics. She has also served on the board of the Swedish Cancer Society and the National Centre for Knowledge on Men's Violence Against Women.

== Political career ==
Nordquist became involved in regional politics in Uppsala and served as a regional councillor from 2013 to 2018. She was elected to the Riksdag in 2018 as a representative of the Liberals for Uppsala County.

She has held positions on several parliamentary committees, including the Committee on Health and Welfare, the Committee on Justice, the Committee on Education, the Committee on Culture and the Committee on Constitutional Affairs. She has also served on the War Delegation of the Riksdag.

In 2022, Nordquist succeeded Mats Persson and became parliamentary group leader of the Liberals in the Riksdag, after he left the position after being appointed Minister for Education in the new government.

== Personal life ==
Nordquist is married to Fredrik Palm and they have two children.
