= Roger Richthoff =

Swedish politician (born 1948)

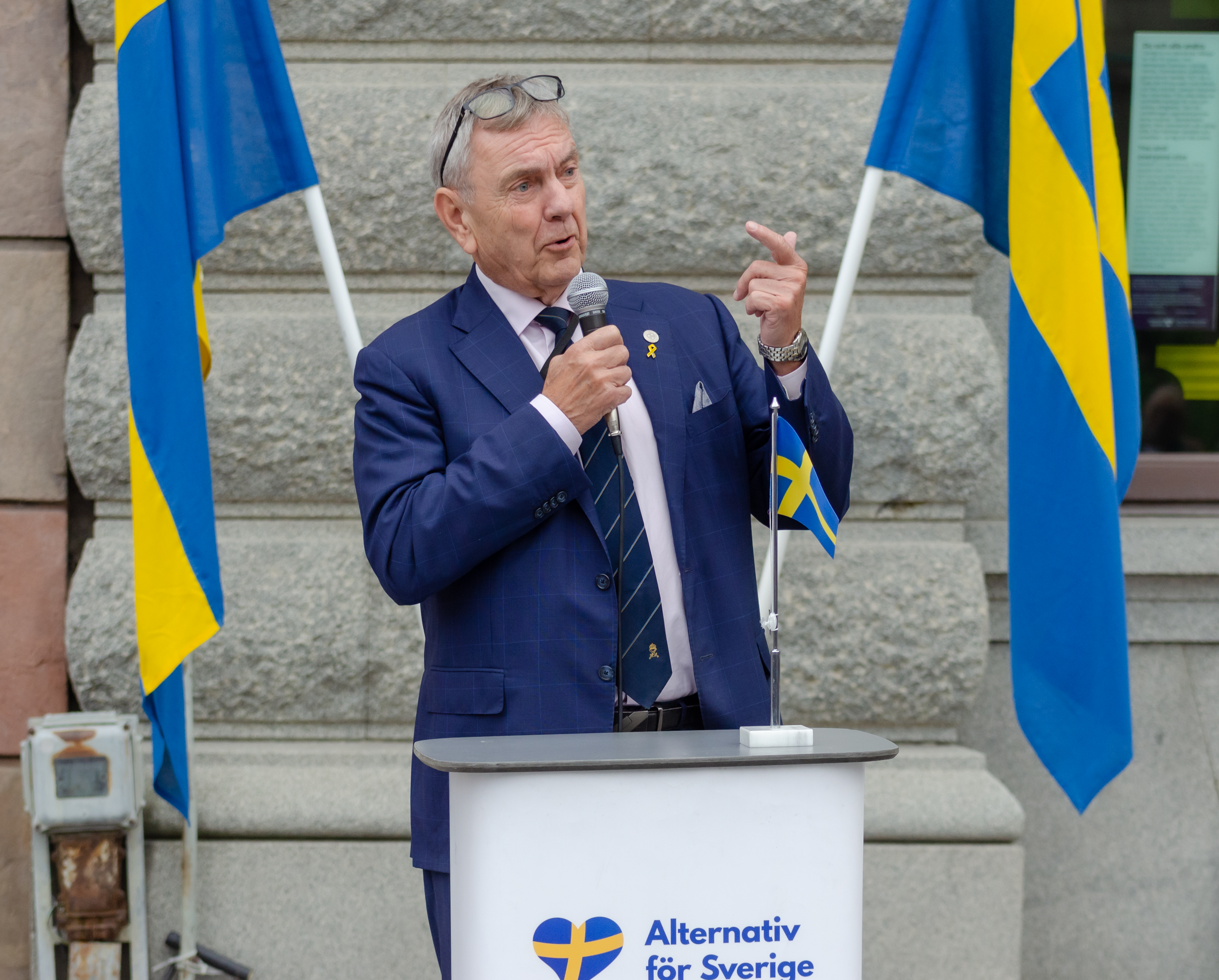
- Richthoff campaigning for Alternative for Sweden, 2022

Member of the Riksdag
- In office 2014–2022
- Constituency: Södermanland County

Personal details
- Born: Roger Karl-Göran Richthoff; 11 December 1948 (age 77) Västmanland, Sweden
- Party: AFS (since 2022); SD (2014–2022)

Roger Karl-Göran Richthoff (born 11 December 1948) is a Swedish politician and former commissioned army officer who was a member of the Riksdag from 2014 to 2022.

Richthoff served in the Swedish Engineer Troops and was a United Nations peacekeeping officer from 1973 to 1991. He was elected to parliament during the 2014 Swedish general election. In parliament, Richthoff has sat on the defense committee and been part of the Delegation of the Riksdag to NATO. He has served as the defense spokesman for the Sweden Democrats (SD). In 2014, Richthoff spoke out against plans to build a refugee camp in Strängnäs.

Richthoff has been noted for controversy on social media. In 2021, he called COVID-19 vaccines for children a "poison injection". He also shared a video wherein Russia is thanked for the 2022 Russian invasion of Ukraine on Twitter. In the video, an antisemitic conspiracy theory is presented, stating that Barack Obama and George Soros is using Ukrainian laboratories to commit genocide against Christians. In response to the latter incident, the SD's leader in Parliament Henrik Vinge denounced Richthoff's actions as "irresponsible" and on 30 March 2022 he left Riksdag Defense Committee and was expelled from the SD's parliamentary group. He remained an independent MP until the next election, which he was barred by the SD from standing as a candidate for the party. Later in the same year he joined the far-right SD-splinter Alternative for Sweden, stating that he agreed with their party programme on several points.
