= Johnny Skalin =

Swedish politician (born 1978)

Hans Johnny Skalin

Member of the Riksdag
- In office 2010–2022
- Constituency: Halland County

Personal details
- Born: 1 April 1978 (age 48) Västernorrland County
- Party: Sweden Democrats

Hans Johnny Skalin (born April 1, 1978) is a Swedish politician who was a member of the Riksdag for the Sweden Democrats party between 2010 and 2022.

Skalin was first elected to parliament during the 2010 Swedish general election. He was initially elected to the constituency of Östergötland County but switched to represent Västernorrland County in 2014. He was the SD's temporary economic spokesman after Erik Almqvist resigned from the position following the iron pipe scandal until Sven-Olof Sällström was appointed as a full-time replacement. Skalin also unsuccessfully stood for the SD during the 2014 European Parliament election and was the third candidate on the party's ballot.

In parliament, Skalin is a member of the EU Committee and a deputy in the Riksdag Foreign Affairs Committee.

Skalin has also called for Sweden to drastically cut down on its immigration and asylum seeker intake. Skalin chose not to stand for re-election ahead of the 2022 Swedish general election.

In 2019, Skalin began a relationship with local Swedish Social Democrats politician and employee Nina Burchardt. After publicly announcing the relationship, Burchardt was forced to resign her duties because of the relationship with a Riksdag member from a different party and because of Skalin's association with the Sweden Democrats.
