= Arin Karapet =

Swedish politician (born 1988)

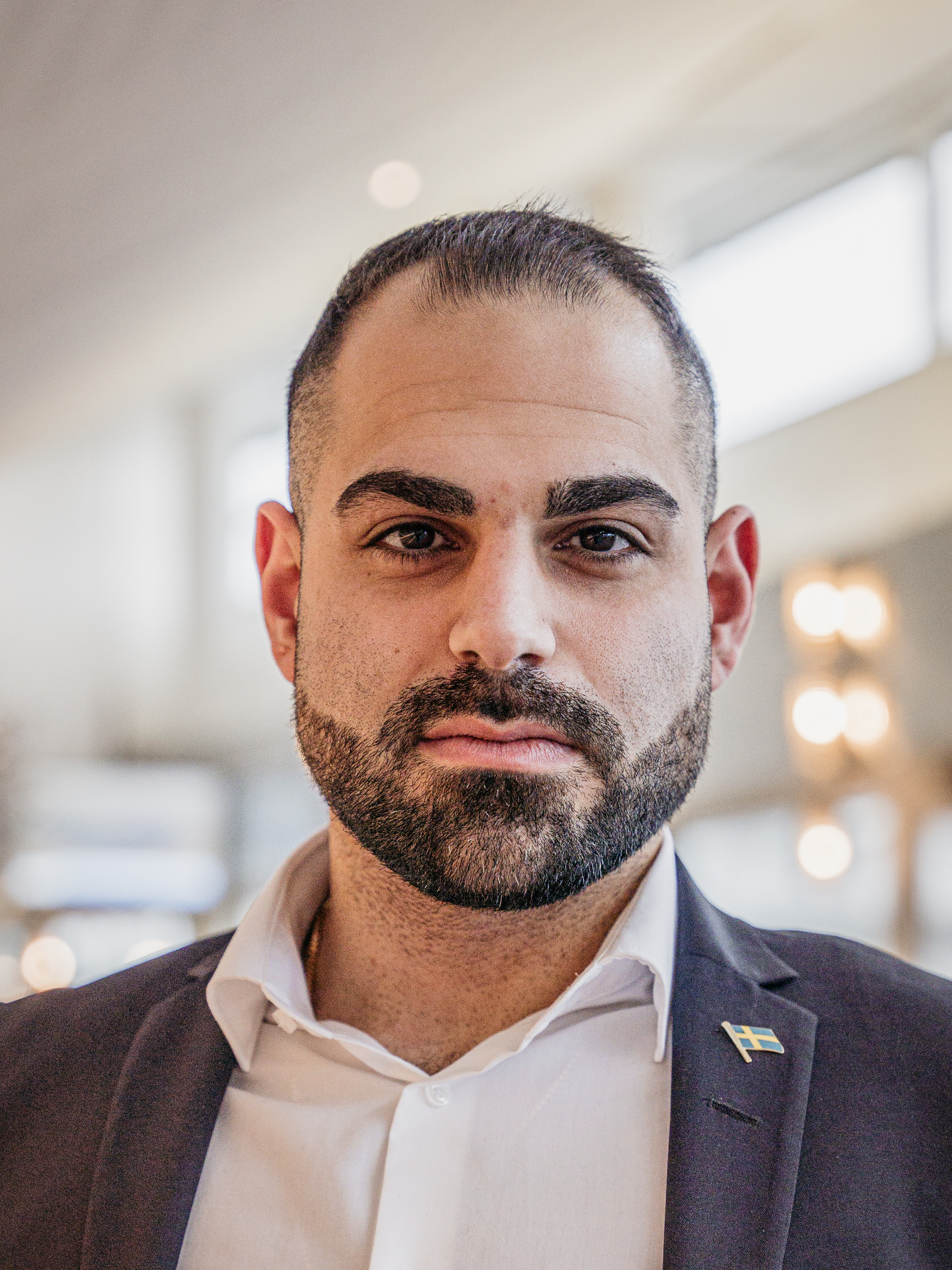
- Karapet in 2020

Member of the Riksdag
- Incumbent
- Assumed office 24 September 2018
- Constituency: Stockholm Municipality

Personal details
- Born: 9 May 1988 (age 38)
- Party: Sweden Democrats (since 2026)
- Other political affiliations: Moderate Party (until 2026)

Arin Karapet (Armenian: Արին Կարապետ; born 9 May 1988) is a Swedish politician serving as a member of the Riksdag since 2018. He was elected for the Moderate Party after being active in the Moderate Youth League to represent Stockholm Municipality. In 2026, Karapet announced he had changed his affiliation to the Sweden Democrats.

== Biography ==
Karapet was born in Spånga in 1988 to an Iranian-Armenian family and was raised in Rinkeby and Hässelby. Karapet has described his upbringing as motivating his interest in politics, stating that his father was addicted to drugs while his mother was unemployed. He has defined himself as a conservative liberal.

After working in the insurance sector he joined the youth-league of the Moderate Party and was elected to the Riksdag during the 2018 Swedish general election. In parliament, he has campaigned for recognition of the Armenian genocide and has called for international condemnation of violence against Christians in the Middle East. In 2022, he led a delegation of Riksdag politicians to meet with the Armenian Prime Minister.

Karapet has been a member of the Parliamentary Assembly of the Organization for Security and Co-operation in Europe since 2023. He was a substitute member of the Parliamentary Assembly of the Council of Europe from 2019 to 2022, and a delegate to the Inter-Parliamentary Union from 2022 to 2023.

In 2026, Karapet left the Moderate Party and joined the Sweden Democrats after saying that he agreed more with the SD's policy on immigration and integration.
