= Hanif Bali =

Swedish politician (born 1987)

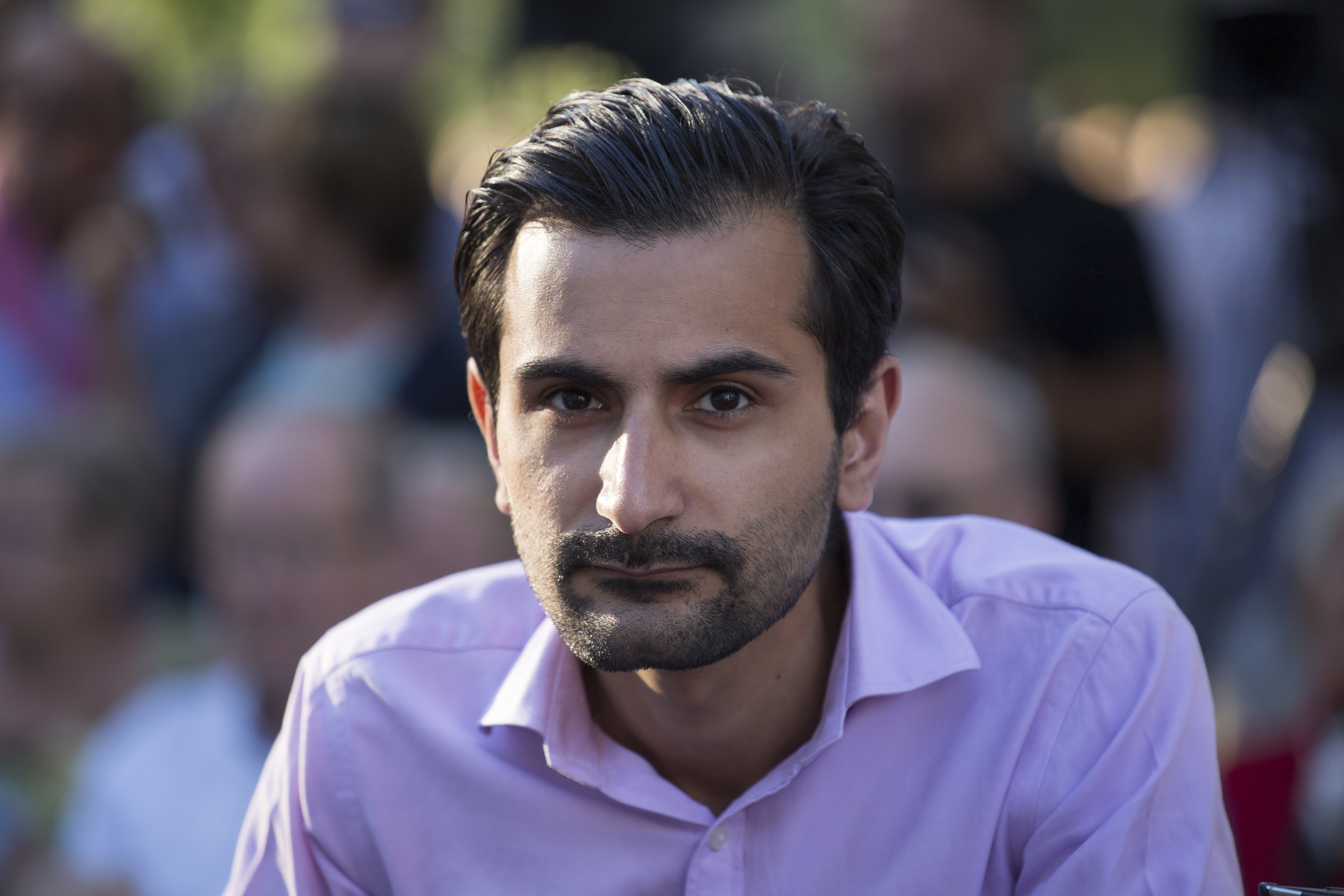
- Bali in July 2015

Member of the Riksdag
- In office 4 October 2010 – 26 September 2022
- Constituency: Stockholm County

Personal details
- Born: Hanif Mohammad Bali; 10 April 1987 (age 39) Kermanshah, Iran
- Party: Moderate
- Education: Uppsala University
- Website: hejahanif.se

Hanif Bali (Swedish: [ˈhǎnːɪf ˈbǎːlɪ]; Persian: حنیف بالی [hæˈniːf ˈbæliː]; born 10 April 1987) is a Swedish politician of the Moderate Party and a former board member of the party. He was member of the Riksdag for Stockholm County between 2010 and 2022. He lives in Österåker, Åkersberga, where he is now active in municipal politics.

Bali arrived in Sweden unaccompanied from Iran at the age of 3, and lived most of his childhood in different foster families. He studied at Uppsala University after finishing gymnasium. Prior to becoming a full-time politician, Bali worked as a programmer and web developer. He worked for the Moderate Party as a webmaster from 2006 to 2007.

Prior to the 2010 Swedish general election, he stood as number 9 on the ticket for the Swedish Riksdag in Stockholm County and was thus the youngest and highest placed newcomer in the Moderate Party in the region. In the Swedish Riksdag, Bali was a permanent member of the Labour Market Committee and a deputy in the Education Committee. He was responsible for integration issues in the Labour Market Committee of the Moderate Party. He also runs a business as an IT consultant.

He is known for being outspoken on Twitter, which has resulted in multiple controversies and comparisons with both US President Donald Trump and political pundit Milo Yiannopoulos for his attacks on political opponents as well as the direct nature of his tweets. In early September 2021, an internal and subsequently an ongoing police investigation was initiated into accusations of sexual misconduct against a minor, and he was relieved from all political assignments pending further investigation. Bali denied the accusations and claimed that they were part of a plot by political opponents ahead of the party primary. On 1 October 2021, the preliminary investigation was discontinued after the prosecutor concluded that there was no reason to assume that a crime had been committed; following the decision, the Moderate Party stated that he could resume his duties as he was no longer the subject of an investigation.

Bali has carried out fundraising activities to collect funds for crime victims. Bali supports the legalization of cannabis to fight drug traffickers and organized crime.
