= Bäckängsgymnasiet =

School in Borås, Sweden

Coordinates: 57°43′19″N 12°56′56″E

Information
- Established: 1968; 57 years ago
- Enrollment: c.1000

Bäckängsgymnasiet is a gymnasium in Borås, Sweden, that offers university preparatory programs in natural and social sciences, art, and humanities. The school was established with this name and curriculum in 1968 and replaced an earlier school, "Högre allmänna läroverket i Borås," which can be translated as "the higher education institute of Borås."

Approximately 1000 students are enrolled in Bäckängsgymnasiet's programs each year.

Famous alumni include: former Prime Minister Ingvar Carlsson, actor Helge Skoog, and artist and filmmaker Pål Hollender.

== See also ==
- Borås
