= Amineh Kakabaveh =

Swedish politician (born 1970)

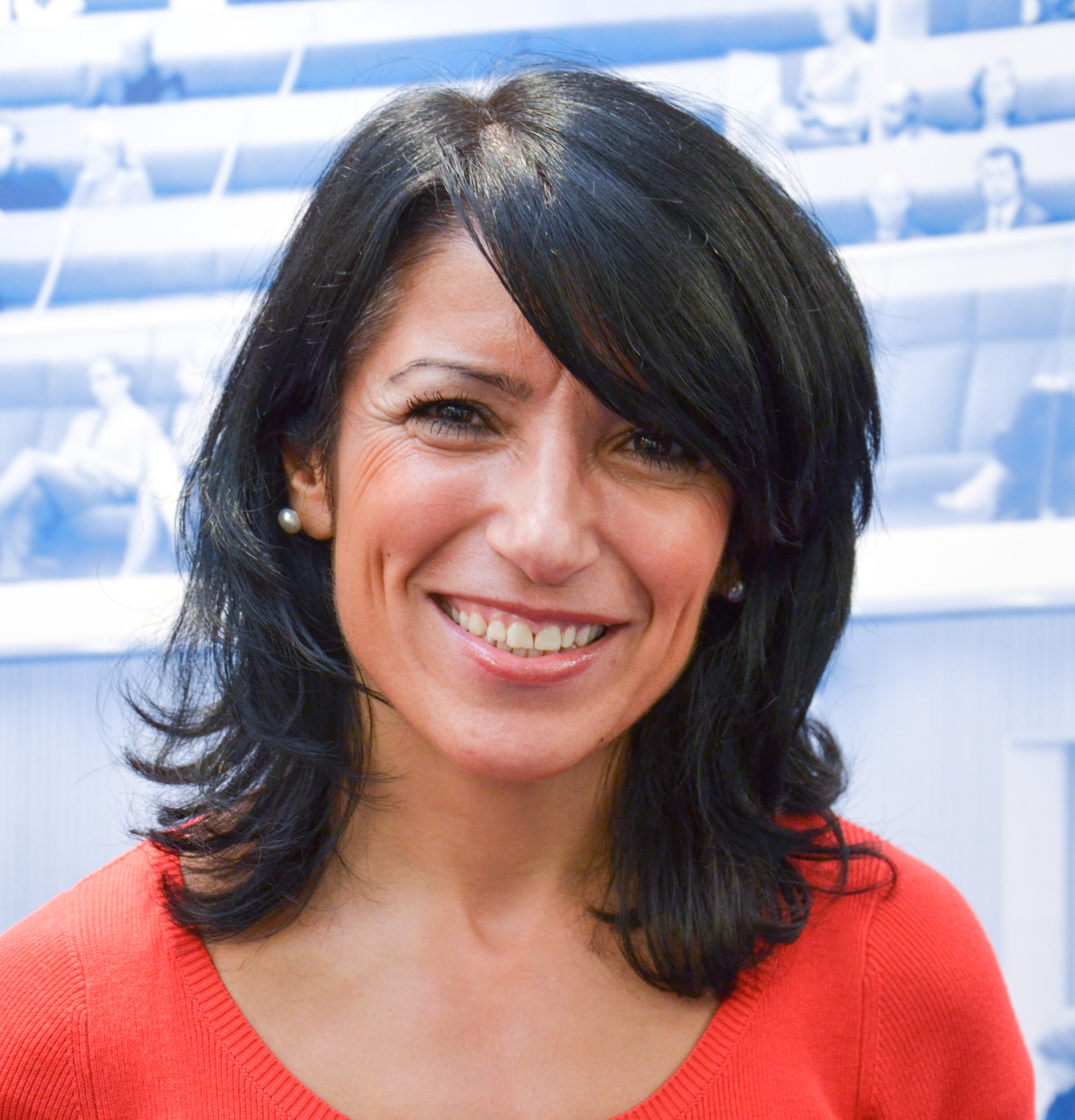

Member of the Riksdag
- In office 18 June 2008 – 26 September 2022
- Constituency: Stockholm County
- In office 16 February 2008 – 17 June 2008; As a substitute MP
- Constituency: Stockholm County

Personal details
- Born: 6 December 1970 (age 55) Saqqez, Kurdistan, Iran
- Party: Independent (since 2019)
- Other political affiliations: Left Party (until 2019); Komala Party of Iranian Kurdistan
- Education: Stockholm University (MA)
- Occupation: Social work

Amineh Kakabaveh (Kurdish: ئامینە کاکەباوە, romanized: Amîne Kakebawe, Persian: اَمینه کاکاباوه; born 6 December 1970) is a Swedish independent politician of Iranian Kurdish descent. Having been a member of the Komala Party of Iranian Kurdistan since her youth, she took refuge in Sweden at the age of nineteen and has become a member of the Riksdag, Sweden's parliament.

== Early life ==
She was born in Saqqez, Iran, and had seven siblings. As a child, she worked to sustain her family. At the age of thirteen, she joined the Kurdish guerilla Komala, where she was trained as a fighter. This early experience of assuming responsibility and the hardships of life in the mountains made her more mature. Later, she fled over Turkey and Greece to Sweden. Having found refuge in Sweden at the age of nineteen, she initially worked as a housemaid by day and attended the evening schools. Later, Kakabaveh graduated with a Master of Science from the Stockholm University in philosophy and social sciences.

== Political career ==
Inspired by the French movement Ni Putes Ni Soumises ("Neither Whores nor Doormats"), Kakabaveh founded in 2005 the feminist and anti-racist organization Varken hora eller kuvad. After the 2006 Swedish general election, she became a member of the Riksdag as a substitute Member of Parliament in 2008. In 2019, she was threatened to be expelled from the Left Party as a result of a prolonged conflict with the party leadership. Before the issue was settled, she left the party voluntarily.

Parliament members cannot be expelled by their parties, so she remained as a member of the parliament. After the 2018 Swedish general election, the Swedish Social Democratic Party coalition had only one member more than the oppositions, so when Kakabaveh became party-less, the government lost their majority. In the 2021 Swedish government crisis, Kakabaveh did not want to support the government. Only after agreeing to some political demands from Kakabaveh concerning support of Kurds and criticism of Recep Tayyip Erdoğan's treatment of Kurds, the government headed by Magdalena Andersson could be elected. After the Swedish application to NATO, of which Turkey is a member, Turkey demanded that Kakabaveh be extradited due to her support of Kurdish organisations.

== Political positions ==
As a politician and opinion maker, Kakabaveh is involved with topics such as honour crimes, women's rights, and secularism. Her work has made her a controversial person within Swedish politics and her own Left Party, but she has also received the title of "Swede of the Year", as awarded by Fokus. In 2017, the Left Party opposed her voicing concern over patriarchal clan structures in Swedish suburbs, alleging that it would lead to further Islamophobia; according to Kakabaveh, the party tried to prevent her re-election to the parliament.

After the fall out within the Left Party in 2019, Kakabaveh resigned her party membership and remained a member of the parliament as an independent politician. She has demanded a better treatment for the about 400,000 immigrants Sweden has received since 2012. In 2018, she saw the immigration policy as naive, and not efficient enough. She is opposed to the NATO accession of Sweden due to her own experiences of war, saying that "NATO has never brought safety to the world", and is a defender of the Swedish policy of non-alignment. In May 2022, she declared that she would not give the governing Swedish Social Democratic Party support in important votes in the parliament since she considered parts of the previous agreement as not having been followed by the Andersson Cabinet.

== Personal life ==
Video of Kakabaveh presenting herself

She has been threatened in the past, and according to herself she has also received protection by the Swedish Security Service (SÄPO).

=== Autobiography ===
Her autobiography Amineh – inte större än en kalasjnikov (Amineh – Not Bigger than a Kalashnikov) was published in 2016, detailing her time with the Peshmerga.

== See also ==
- List of members of the Swedish Riksdag
