= Daniel Andersson (politician) =

Swedish politician (born 1986)

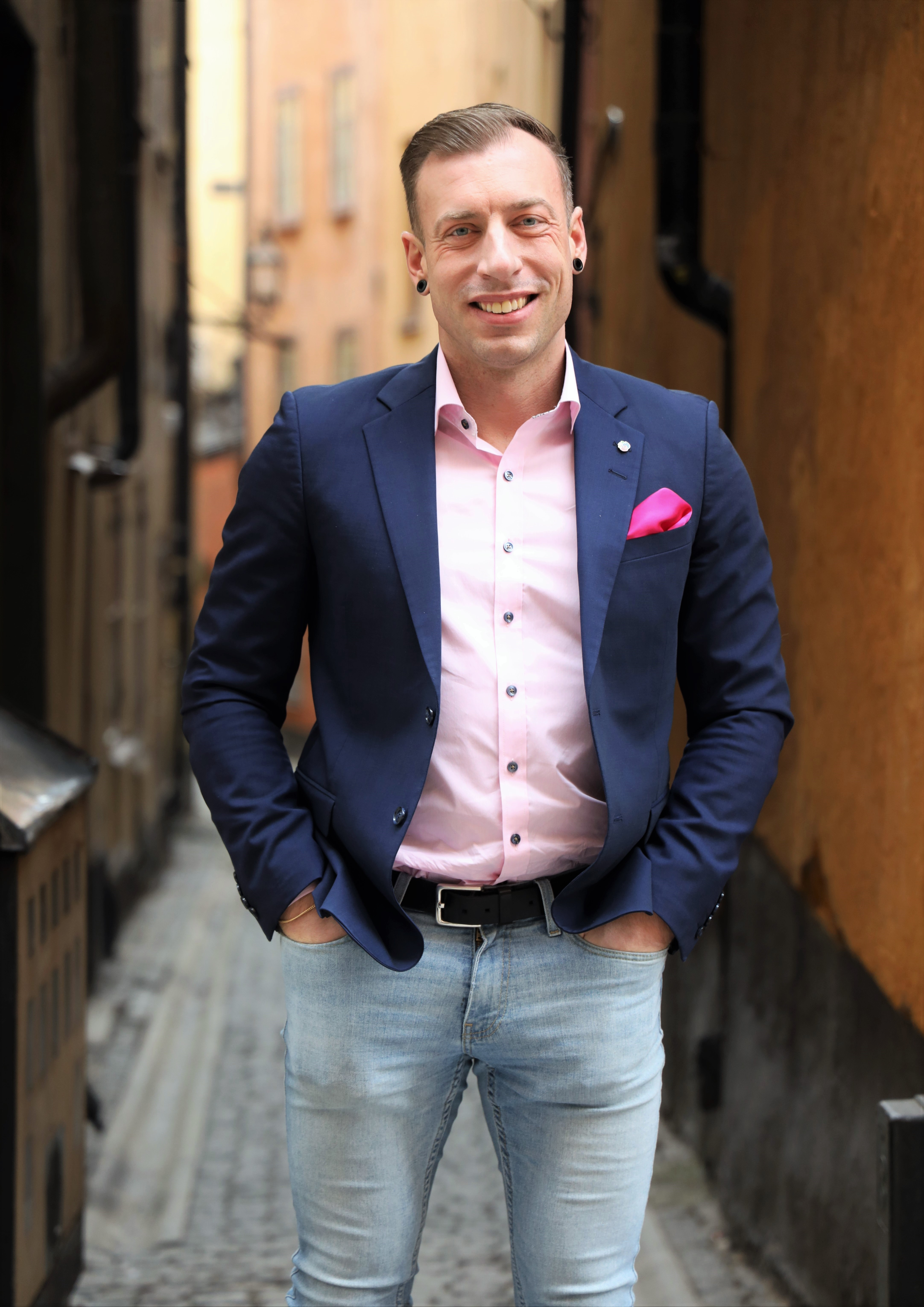
- Andersson in 2022

Member of the Riksdag
- In office 3 September 2021 – 26 September 2022
- Preceded by: Lena Rådström Baastad
- Constituency: Örebro County

Personal details
- Born: 1986 (age 39–40) Frövi, Sweden
- Party: Social Democratic Party

Daniel Andersson (born 1986) is a Swedish politician and former member of the Riksdag, the national legislature. A member of the Social Democratic Party, he represented Örebro County between September 2021 and September 2022. He has been a substitute member of the Riksdag for Matilda Ernkrans twice, from January 2019 to September 2021 and from September 2022 to October 2022.

Andersson was born and raised in Frövi. He was educated at a folk high school in Fellingsbro. He has been a member of the municipal council in Lindesberg Municipality since 2014. He worked as an after-school leader.
