= Johan Büser =

Swedish politician (born 1983)

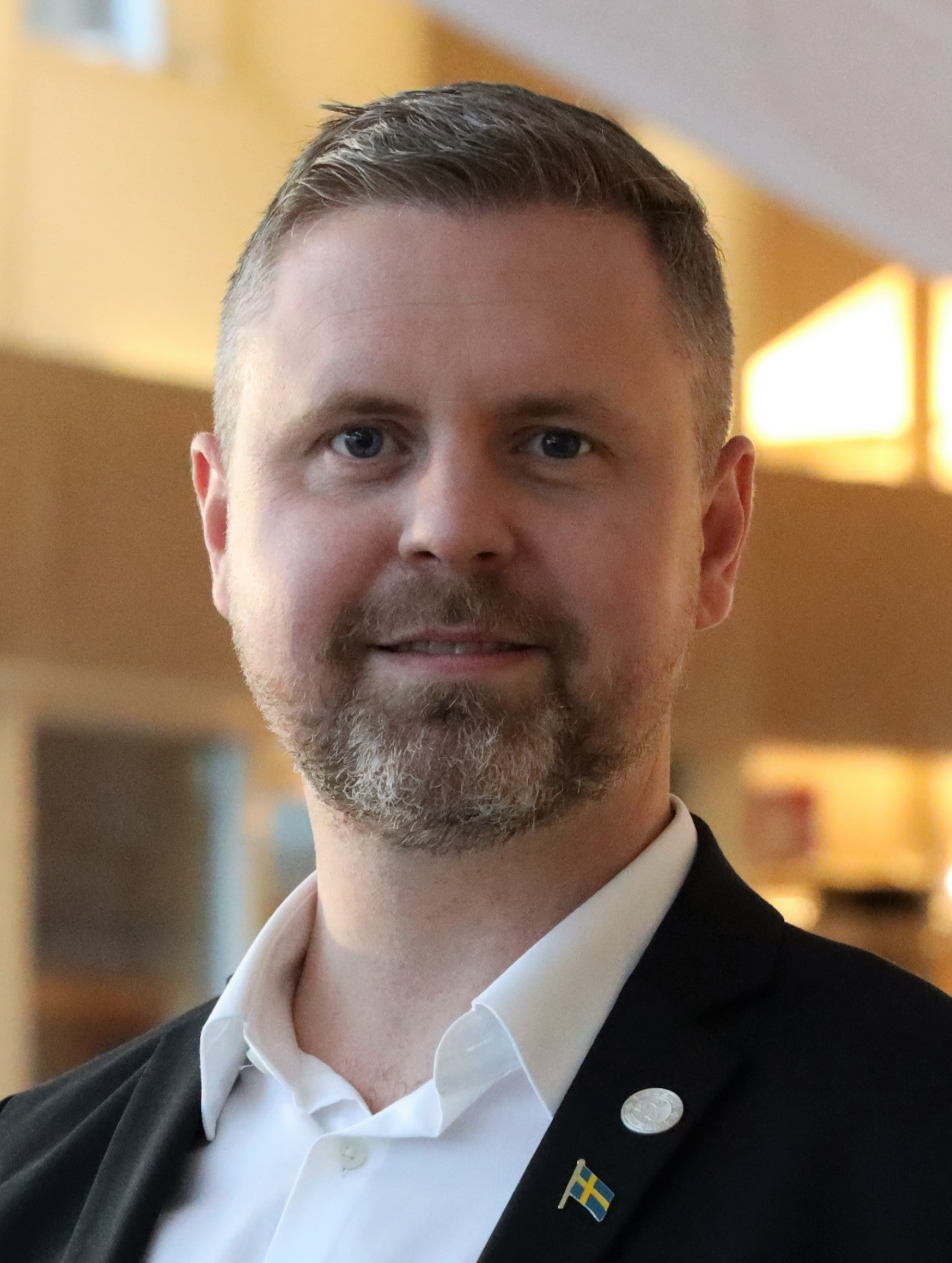
- Büser in 2022

Member of the Riksdag
- Incumbent
- Assumed office 29 September 2014
- Constituency: Gothenburg Municipality

Personal details
- Born: Johan Ulf Tobias Büser; 1983 (age 42–43)
- Party: Social Democratic Party
- Education: University of Gothenburg

Johan Ulf Tobias Büser (born 1983) is a Swedish politician and member of the Riksdag, the national legislature. A member of the Social Democratic Party, he has represented Gothenburg Municipality since September 2014.

Büser is the son of toolmaker Ulf Nygren and business manager Annika Büser. He studied law at the Gothenburg School of Business, Economics and Law, University of Gothenburg. He has worked as a forklift driver, fitter and school teacher. He held various roles at the Swedish Social Democratic Youth League (SSU) before entering the Riksdag. He had previously been a member of the board of the Port of Gothenburg.
