= Arhe Hamednaca =

Swedish politician (born 1953)

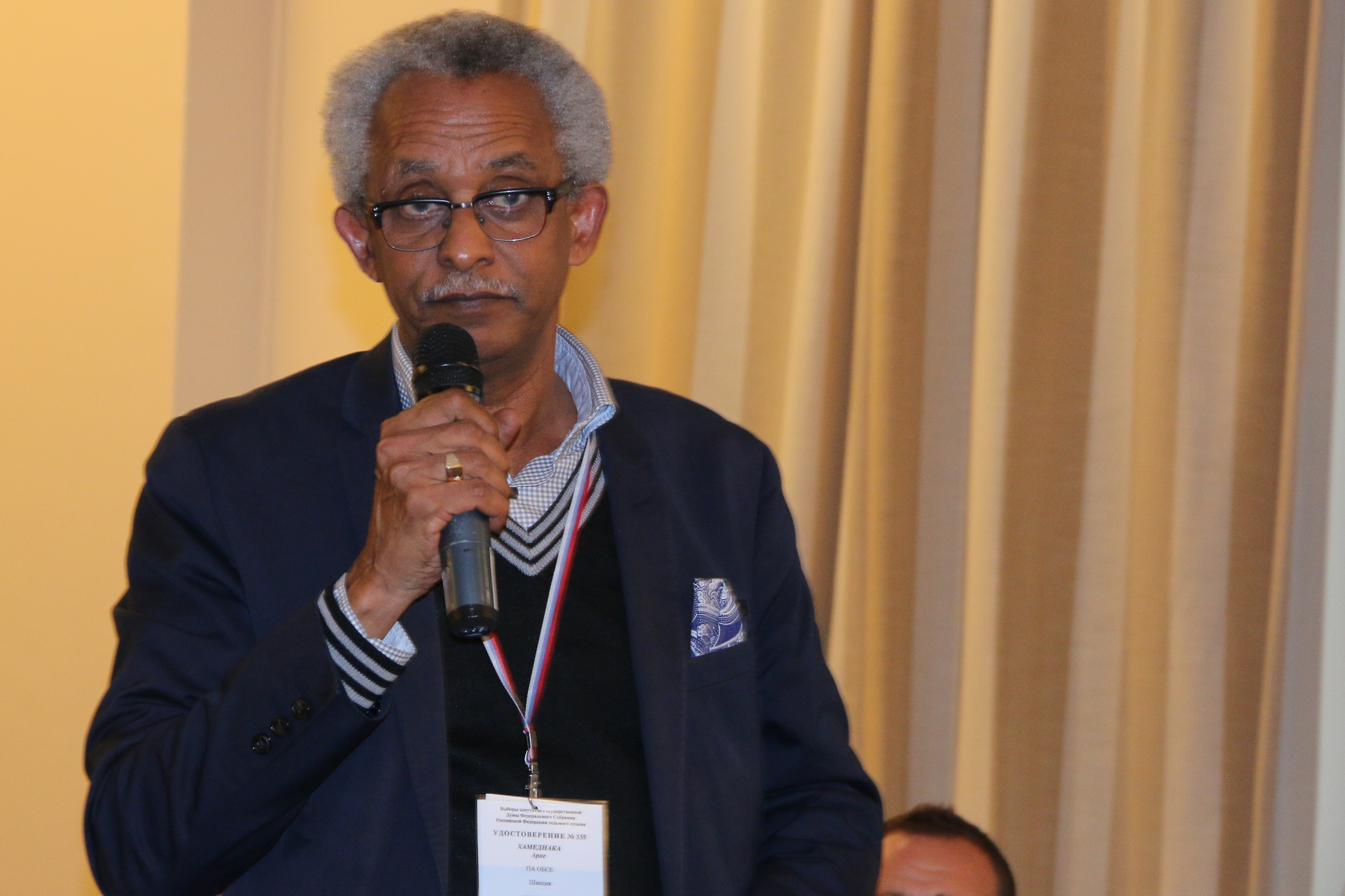
- Hamednaca in September 2016

Member of the Riksdag
- In office 4 October 2010 – 24 September 2018
- Constituency: Stockholm Municipality

Personal details
- Born: 1953 (age 72–73) Yiker, Ethiopian-Eritrean Federation
- Party: Social Democratic Party

Arhe Hamednaca (born 1953) is a Swedish politician and former member of the Riksdag, the national legislature. A member of the Social Democratic Party, he represented Stockholm Municipality between October 2010 and September 2018.

Hamednaca was born in the village of Yiker in the Ethiopian-Eritrean Federation. He is an Orthodox Christian. Whilst a child Hamednaca witnessed many acts of brutality committed against Eritreans by Ethiopian Armed Forces and Highland Eritrean paramilitaries opposed to Eritrean independence. He began helping Eritrean rebels fighting for Eritrean independence. He was abducted and tortured for a month by the paramilitaries before his father secured his release. A year later, in 1968, Hamednaca, aged 15, joined the Eritrean Liberation Front (ELF) as a child soldier. The paramilitaries abducted Hamednaca's father, tortured him and kept him prisoner for years. In the late 1970s the ELF began to fragment and Hamednaca left the front line. He left Eritrea in 1977, first moving to Sudan before arriving in Sweden in December 1984.

Hamednaca and his family lived in the Östberga suburb of Stockholm. He studied at a Komvux whilst working as a cleaner at a kindergarten. Financial circumstances prevented him from attending university. He worked for Storstockholms Lokaltrafik (SL) from 1990 to 2002 and for Fryshuset from 2002 to 2010. In 2002, following the murder of Fadime Şahindal, Hamednaca founded the Sharaf Heroes organisation to help young people affected by honor crimes and change perception of women. He became a special advisor to Minister for Democracy, Metropolitan Affairs, Integration, and Gender Equality Jens Orback in 2004. Hamednaca is a critic of the totalitarian government of Eritrea led by dictator Isaias Afwerki.
