= Mats Berglund =

Swedish politician (born 1970)

Member of the Riksdag
- In office 1 January 2024 – 28 September 2026
- Preceded by: Per Bolund
- Constituency: Stockholm Municipality

Personal details
- Born: 4 March 1970 (age 56) Sollentuna, Sweden
- Party: Green Party

Mats Henrik Gösta Berglund (born 4 March 1970) is a Swedish politician and former Member of the Riksdag. A member of the Green Party, he represented Stockholm Municipality from January 2024 to September 2026.

Berglund was born on 4 March 1970 in Sollentuna. He has a PhD in history. He is a historian, researcher and university lecturer. He specialises in Swedish urban history in the 17th, 18th and 19th centuries. He works at the Department of Research and Collaboration Support at Stockholm University.

Berglund was a member of Stockholm City Council. He was a substitute member of the Riksdag for Maria Ferm between January 2019 and November 2021. He was appointed to the Riksdag in January 2024 following the resignation of Per Bolund. He was the Green Party's spokesperson on higher education and research.

Electoral history of Mats Berglund
Election	Constituency	Party	List no.	Votes	%	Result
2014 local	Stockholm Municipality - Östra Söderort	Green Party	15			Elected - party mandate
2018 general	Stockholm Municipality	Green Party	8	87	0.18%	Not elected
2022 general	Stockholm Municipality	Green Party	6	113	0.19%	Not elected
2022 local	Stockholm Municipality	Green Party	6	27	0.07%	Not elected
2026 general	Stockholm Municipality	Green Party	8	123	0.17%	Not elected
