= Martin Kinnunen =

Swedish politician (born 1983)

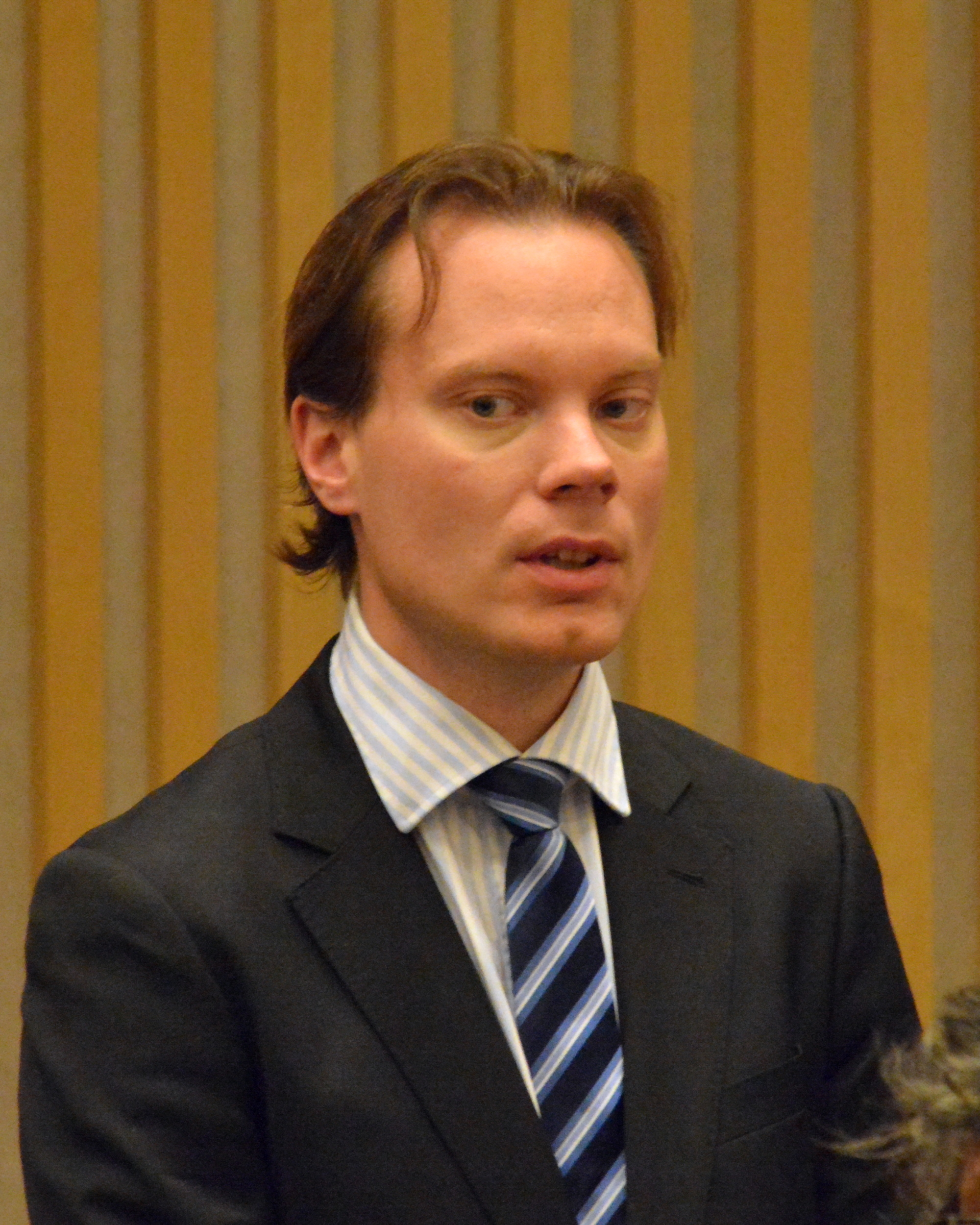

Member of the Riksdag
- Incumbent
- Assumed office 9 September 2018
- Constituency: Stockholm Municipality
- In office 14 September 2014 – 8 September 2018
- Constituency: Gothenburg Municipality

Leader of the Sweden Democratic Youth
- In office May 2005 – 2007
- Preceded by: Jimmie Åkesson
- Succeeded by: Erik Almqvist

Personal details
- Born: Martin Anders Kinnunen; 15 May 1983 (age 43) Huddinge Parish, Stockholm County, Sweden
- Party: Sweden Democrats
- Education: Stockholm University (BA)
- Profession: Politician

Martin Anders Kinnunen (born 15 May 1983) is a Swedish-Finnish member of parliament for the Sweden Democrats party. He was previously the press secretary for the party, as well as leader for the party's youth organisation the Sweden Democratic Youth (SDU) between 2005 and 2007. He took over that position from Jimmie Åkesson and was succeeded by Erik Almqvist.

== Biography ==
Kinnunen graduated with a BA degree in economics from Stockholm University. He began training as an economist and then worked as an office secretary for the Sweden Democrats' national organisation in Stockholm; he left the position in late 2009. He was elected to the Swedish Riksdag parliament during the 2014 Swedish general election for the Gothenburg Municipality and since the 2018 election has represented the Stockholm Municipality.

Kinnunen and his fiancée were assaulted and beaten at an attack at Gullmarsplan subway station in Stockholm on 6 June 2009. Three women were later convicted for the attack on Kinnunen's fiancée, and one man was sentenced to prison for the same attack.

On 29 September 2015, Kinnunen was charged with two cases of tax fraud. He was accused of embezzling large amounts of money while working for the Sweden Democrat owned companies Samtid och Framtid and Blåsippan AB. He was acquitted of all charges by the district court on 5 February 2016. However, as trials continued in November 2016, it was revealed that Kinunnen had authorized fraudulent dates on the concerned invoices; the outcome is as yet unknown, although he stated on 22 November that even if he were found guilty of serious tax fraud on behalf of the SweDems, he would continue as a SweDem politician without issue. On 6 December 2016 the Court of Appeal found him guilty of accounting fraud. He was sentenced to a fine of approximately 9,000 EUR while the SweDem owned company was fined 30,000 EUR for fraudulent accounting and tax evasion.
