= Committee on Cultural Affairs (Parliament of Sweden) =

Swedish parliamentary committee

The (Parliamentary) Committee on Cultural Affairs (Swedish: Kulturutskottet, KrU) is a parliamentary committee in the Swedish Riksdag. The committee areas of responsibility concern general cultural and educational purposes, popular education, youth activities, international cultural cooperation, and sports. The committee also debates church issues and matters concerning radio and television, and immigration and integration policies, insofar as they do not belong to the Constitutional Committee's preparation.

The committee's speaker is Amanda Lind from the Green Party and the vice-speaker is Robert Hannah from the Liberals.

== List of speakers for the committee ==
Name	Period	Political party
Lennart Mattsson	1971–1976	Centre Party
Georg Andersson	1976–1982	Social Democratic Party
Britt Mogård	1982-1983	Moderate Party
Ingrid Sundberg	1983–1991	Moderate Party
Åke Gustavsson	1991–1998	Social Democratic Party
Inger Davidsson	1998-2002	Christian Democrats
Lennart Kollmats	2002–2006	Liberal People's Party
Siv Holma	2006–2010	Vänsterpartiet
Berit Högman	2010–2012	Social Democratic Party
Gunilla Carlsson i Hisings Backa	2012–2014	Social Democratic Party
Per Bill	2014–2015	Moderate Party
Olof Lavesson	2015–2018	Moderate Party
Christer Nylander	2018–2022	Liberals
Amanda Lind	2022–	Green Party

== List of vice-speakers for the committee ==
Name	Period	Political party	Notes
Åke Gustavsson	1998–2002	Social Democratic Party	
Annika Nilsson	2002–2005	Social Democratic Party	
Lars Wegendal	2005-2006	Social Democratic Party	
Cecilia Wikström	2006-2009	Liberal People's Party	
Christer Nylander	2009–2013	Liberal People's Party	
Ulf Nilsson	2013–2014	Liberal People's Party	
Gunilla Carlsson i Hisings Backa	2014–2018	Social Democratic Party	
Vasiliki Tsouplaki	2018–2022	Left Party	
Lotta Finstorp	2019–2022	Moderate Party	Second vice-speaker
Lawen Redar	2019–2022	Social Democratic Party	Third vice-speaker
Robert Hannah	2022–	Liberals	
