= Alireza Akhondi =

Swedish politician (born 1980)

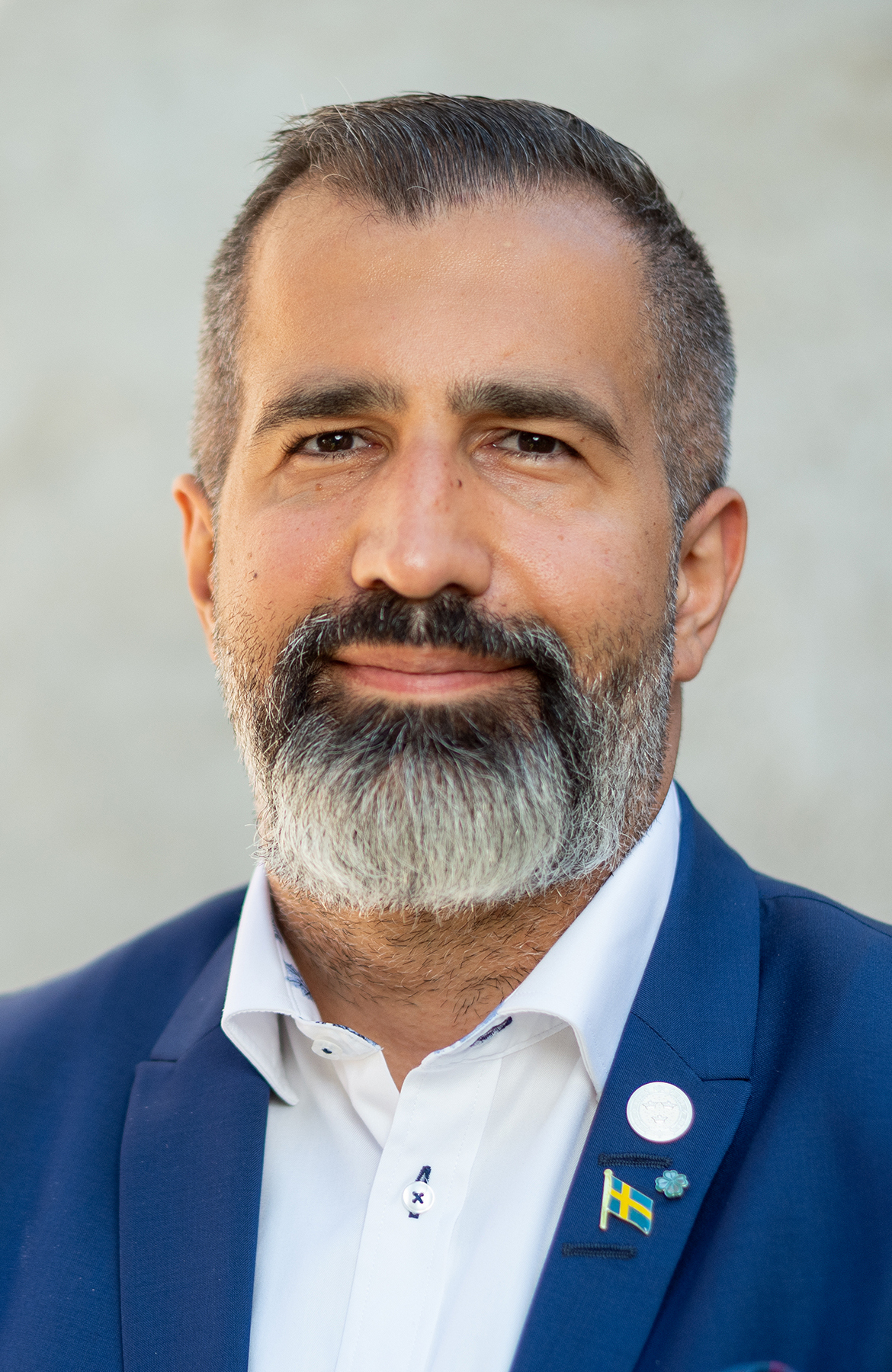

Member of the Riksdag
- Incumbent
- Assumed office 24 September 2018
- Constituency: Stockholm County

Personal details
- Born: Alireza Akhondi; 20 September 1980 (age 44); Isfahan, Iran
- Political party: Centre Party

Alireza Akhondi (born 20 September 1980 in Isfahan, Iran) is a Swedish politician for the Centre Party. He has been a member of parliament since 2018, representing Stockholm County's constituency.

In the Riksdag, he is a member of the Committee on Civil Affairs and was a member of the Committee on the Labour Market. He has been a deputy in many other committees.

Akhondi was born in Iran and is of Iranian descent.
