= Malin Danielsson =

Swedish politician (born 1977)

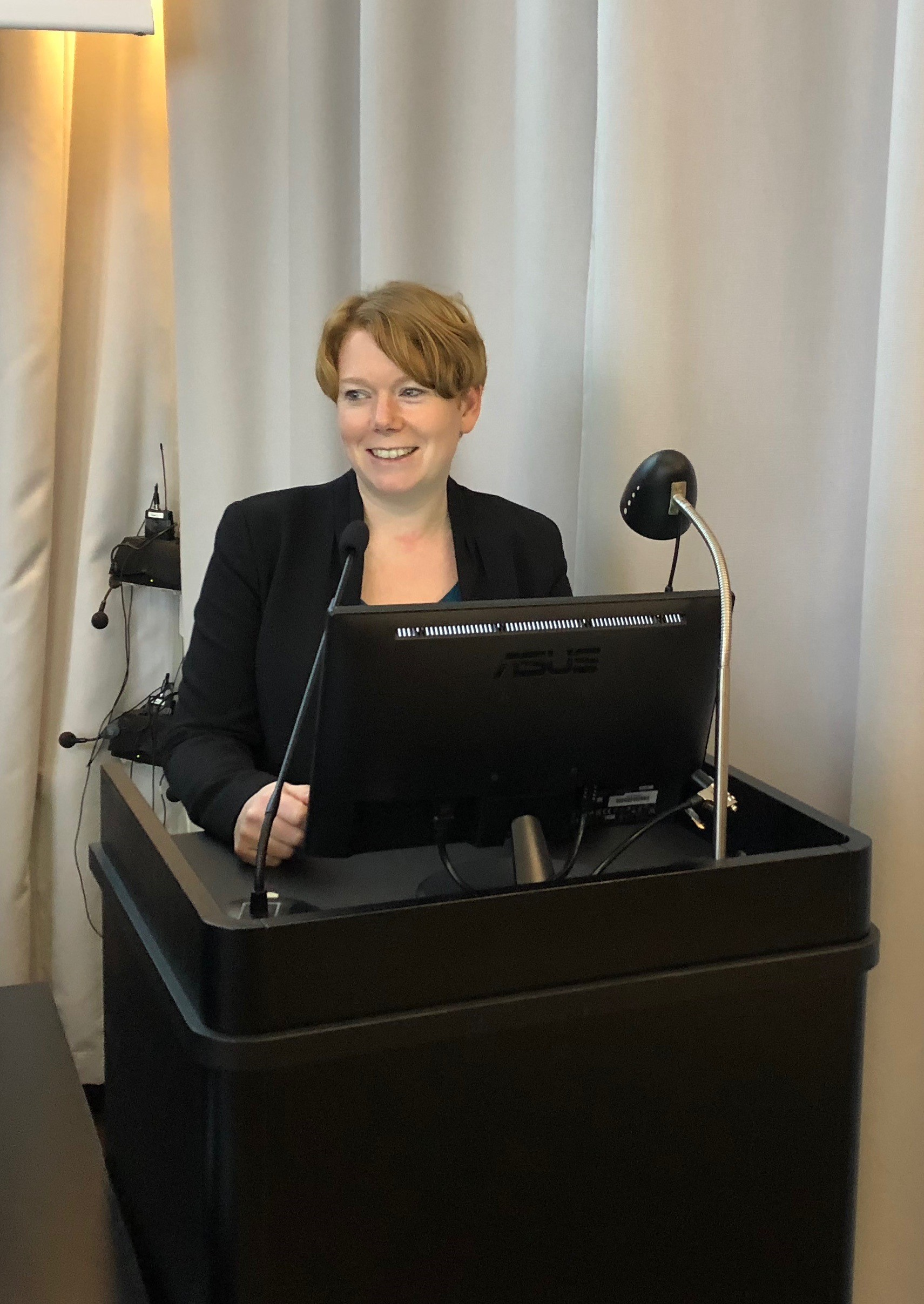
- Malin Danielsson in 2019

Member of the Riksdag
- Incumbent
- Assumed office 26 September 2022
- Constituency: Stockholm Municipality

Personal details
- Born: Eva Malin Lisette Danielsson; 28 July 1977 (age 49) Martin Luther Parish, Halland County, Sweden
- Party: Liberal

Eva Malin Lisette Danielsson (born 28 July 1977) is a Swedish politician from the Liberals. Since 2022, she has been a member of the Riksdag elected for the constituency of Stockholm Municipality previously elected for the Stockholm County constituency (2020–2022).

== Biography ==
Danielsson was born in Martin Luther Parish in Halland County. Danielsson has served on the Huddinge municipal council between 2006 and 2022 and was the party's group leader from 2009 to 2020. Danielsson was the deputy chair of the municipal board and municipal councillor with responsibility for urban planning issues from 2015 to 2020. Before that, she was a municipal councillor and chair of the primary school committee between 2009 and 2014 and chair of the culture and leisure committee from 2007 to 2009. She has also served on the board of Storsthlm (formerly KSL) and has been on the federal board of the Liberals in Stockholm County since 2015.

Danielsson has previously been, among other things, head of the office for Young Visually Impaired People (Unga med synnedsättning).

=== Riksdag ===
Danielsson ran in the 2018 Swedish general election and was appointed as the new substitute from 9 October 2019. She was appointed as the new ordinary member of parliament from 1 February 2020 after Maria Arnholm resigned from her position.

In the Riksdag, Danielsson was a member of the Committee on the Labour Market 2020–2022. From September 2022 to February 2025, she was a regular member of the Constitutional Committee. In February 2025, she was elected Vice Chair of the Culture Committee. She is a deputy member of the Committee on European Union Affairs, the Social Affairs Committee, the Constitutional Committee, and the Labour Market Committee.

Danielsson is the party's spokesperson on cultural issues, disability rights issues and senior issues.
