= Patrik Jönsson =

Swedish politician (born 1972)

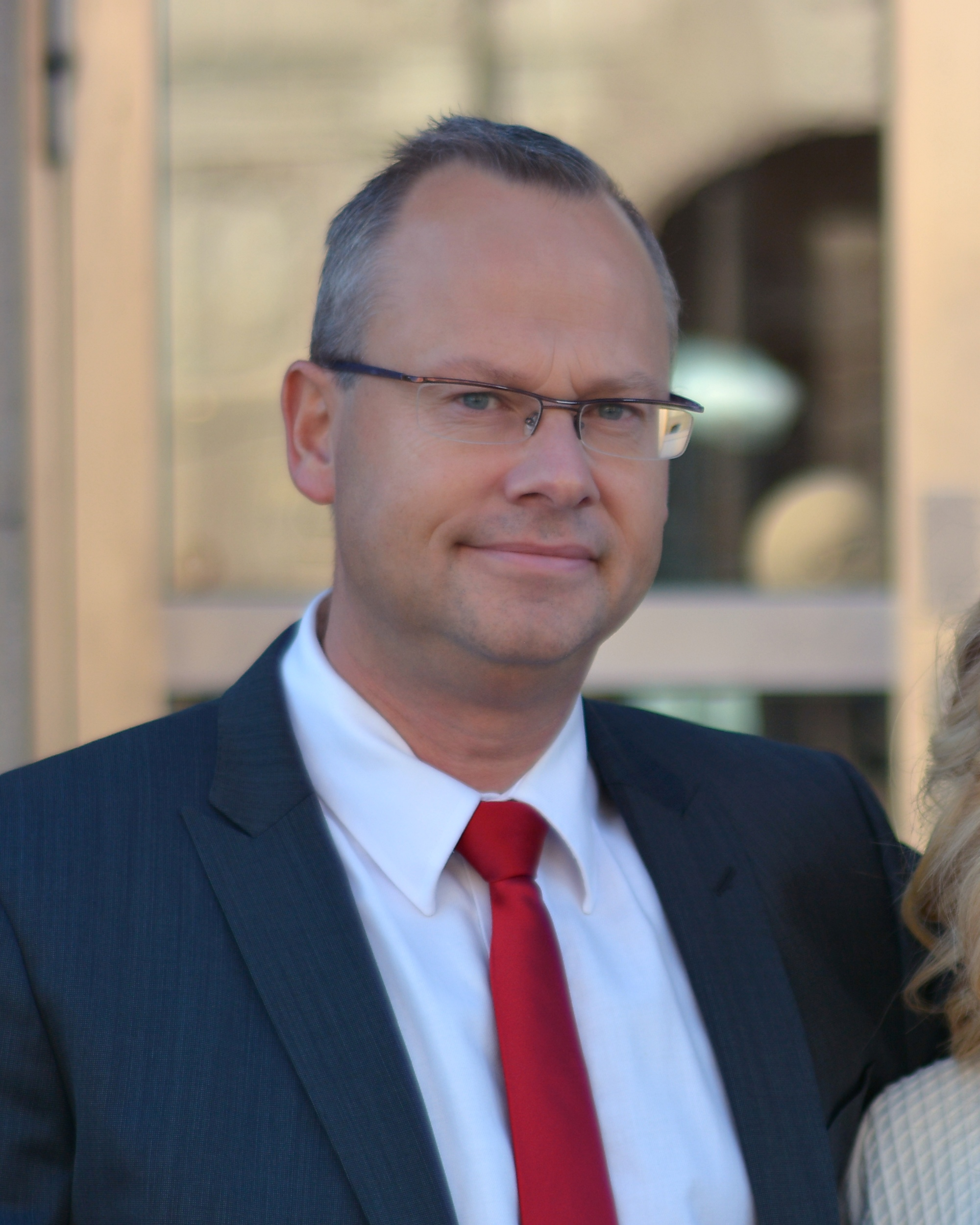

Member of the Riksdag
- Incumbent
- Assumed office 2014
- Constituency: Skåne County

Personal details
- Born: 16 October 1972 (age 54) Hässleholm
- Party: Sweden Democrats

Mats Patrik Torbjörn Jönsson (born 16 October 1972) is a Swedish politician and member of the Riksdag for the Sweden Democrats party.

Jönsson worked as a civil servant for the Swedish Transport Administration in traffic management. Since October 2014, he has been a councilor in Skåne. and was elected to the Riksdag in the 2014 Swedish general election for the Sweden Democrats. In parliament, he sits on the Transport and Justice Committees.
