= Teres Lindberg =

Swedish politician (born 1974)

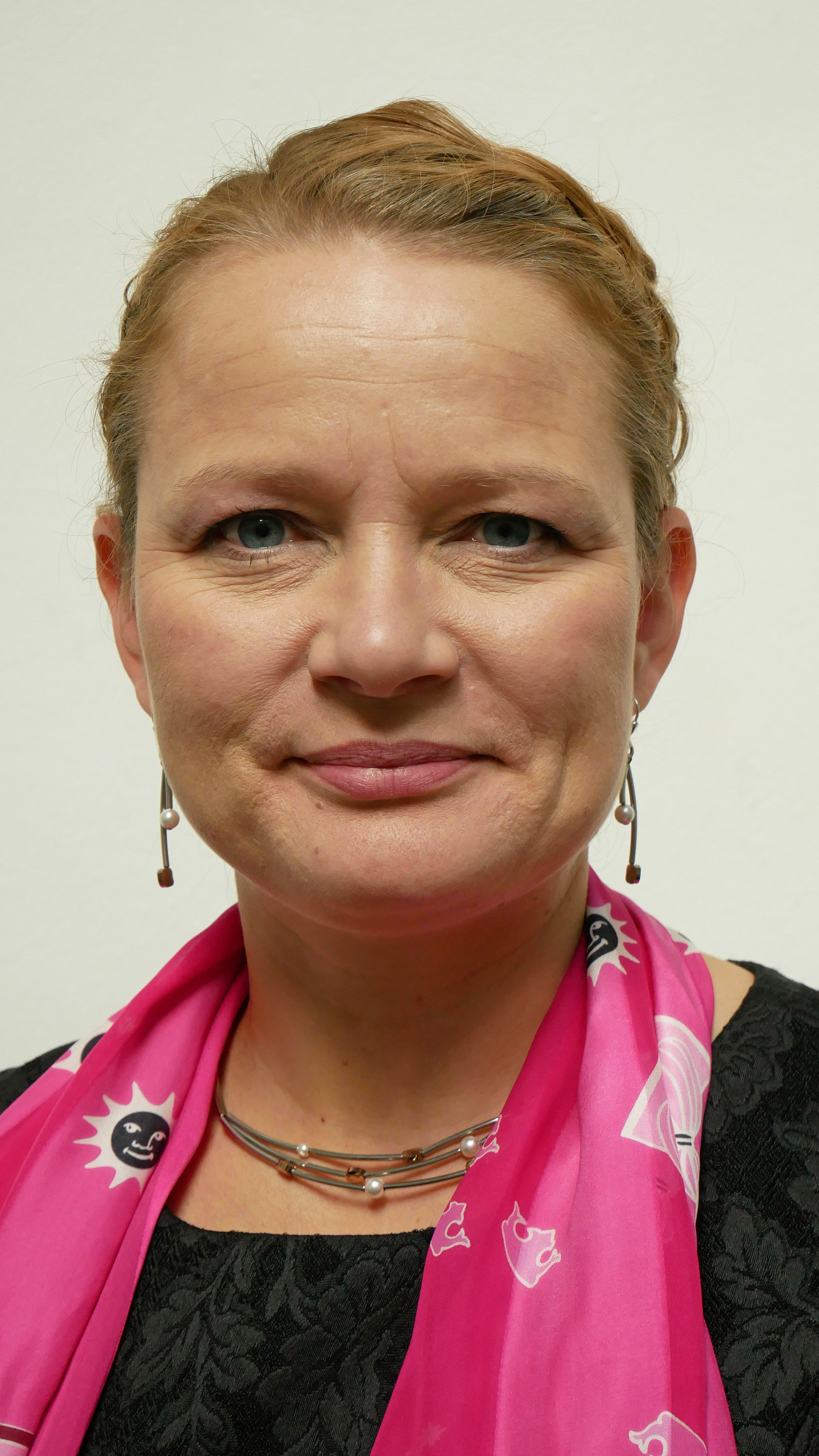
- Lindberg in September 2019

Member of the Riksdag
- In office 25 September 2017 – 26 September 2022
- Preceded by: Börje Vestlund
- Constituency: Stockholm Municipality
- In office 1 April 2011 – 29 September 2014
- Preceded by: Mona Sahlin
- Constituency: Stockholm Municipality

Personal details
- Born: 1974 (age 51–52)
- Party: Social Democratic Party
- Education: Stockholm University

Teres Victoria Lindberg (born 1974) is a Swedish politician, trade unionist and former member of the Riksdag, the national legislature. A member of the Social Democratic Party, she represented Stockholm Municipality between April 2011 and September 2014, and between September 2017 and September 2022. She had previously been a substitute member of the Riksdag three times: October 2014 to September 2015 (for Ylva Johansson); October 2015 to May 2017 (for Anders Ygeman); and May 2017 to September 2017 (for Stefan Löfven).

Lindberg was educated at a folk high school in Stockholm and studied at Stockholm University. She was as a postal worker between 1992 and 2002. She has held various roles at the Swedish Union for Service and Communications Employees (SEKO) trade union and Swedish Social Democratic Youth League (SSU). She was a member of the municipal council in Stockholm Municipality from 1999 to 2010.
