= Jens Holm =

Swedish politician (born 1971)

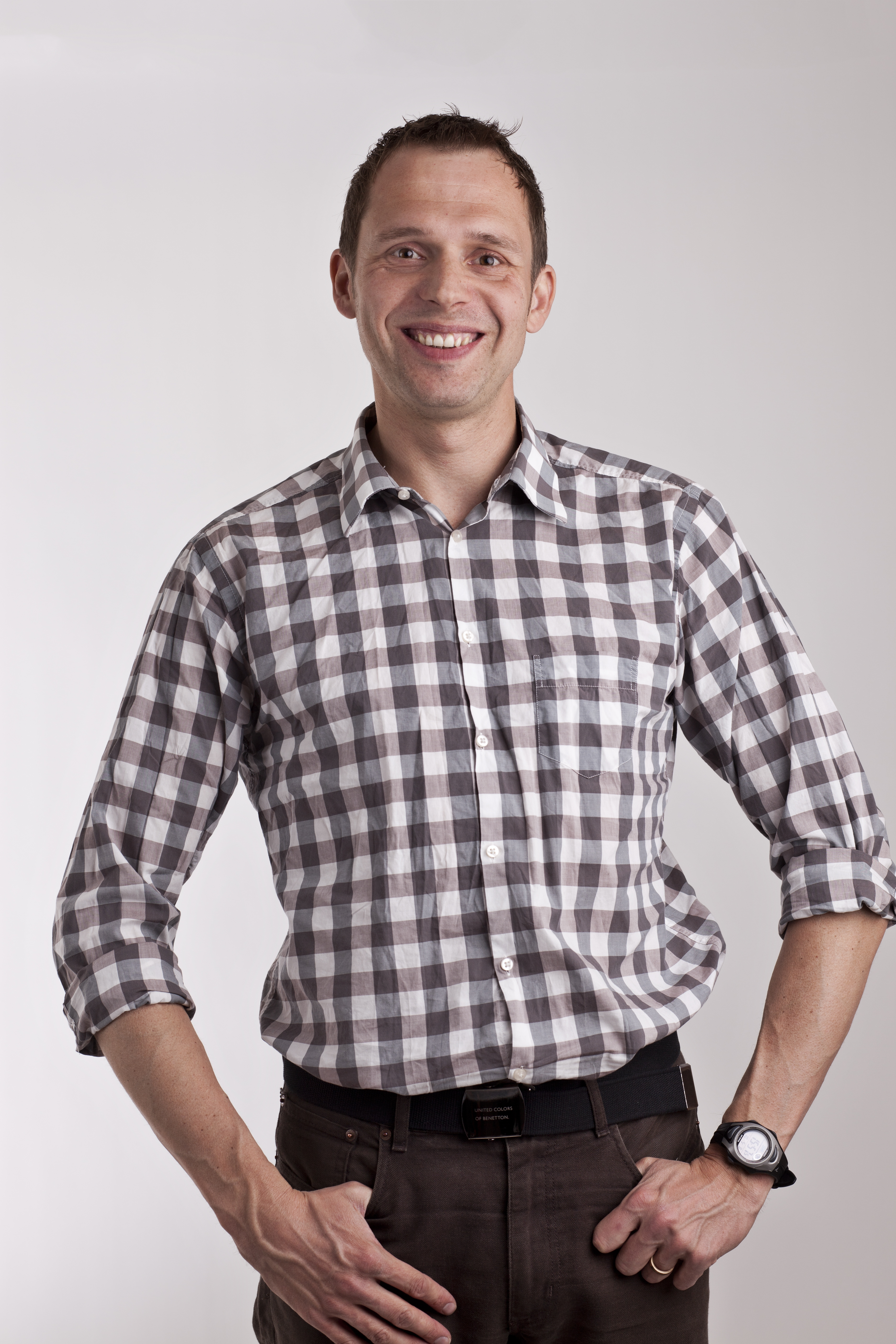

Member of the Swedish Parliament for Stockholm Municipality
- In office 2010–2022

Personal details
- Born: 18 April 1971 (age 55) Sundsvall, Sweden
- Party: Left Party
- Website: jensholm.se

Jens Holm (born 18 April 1971) is a Swedish politician. 2006-2009 he served as a Member of the European Parliament (MEP) for the Left Party sitting with the EUL/NGL group. On 27 September 2006 he took up the seat vacated by Jonas Sjöstedt. He was elected to the Swedish Parliament in the 2010 election and remained a member of parliament until the 2022 election.

He is also a founding member of Colombianätverket ("The Colombia Network"), a Sweden-based organisation which describes its objective as to "support efforts toward a peaceful and socially just solution to the conflict in Colombia". In 2013, the officer Hans-Erik Sjöholm claimed that as part of his infiltration of the Left Party on behalf of the Swedish Intelligence Service, he had spied on Holm, due to Holm's connection to FARC.

Holm argues that meat production is environmentally hazardous, and in March 2007 he made a proposal to introduce taxes for meat producers. He is also an ethical vegetarian himself, and was a vegan between 1994 and 2008.
