= Robert Hannah =

Swedish politician (born 1985)

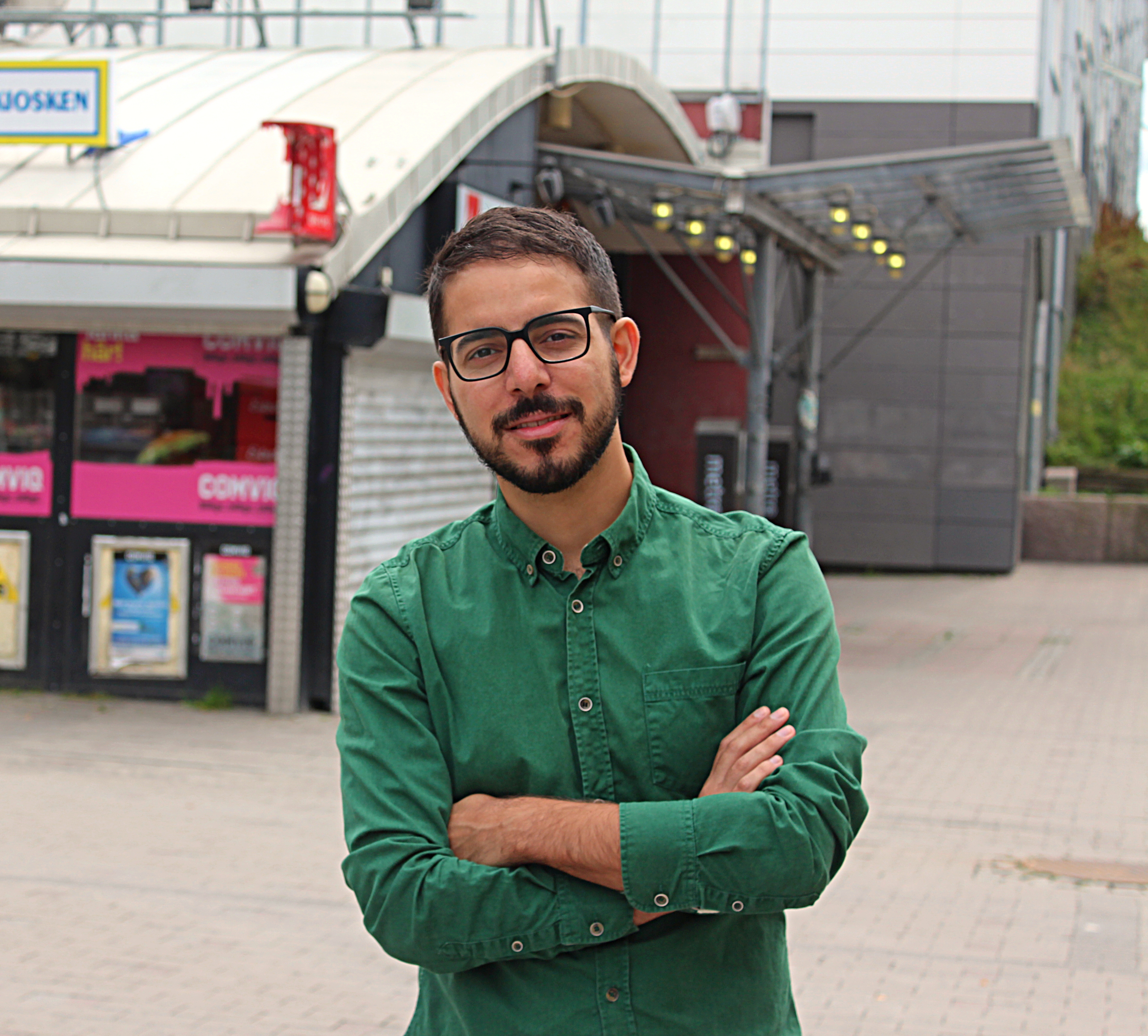
- Hannah in 2014

Member of the Riksdag
- In office 2014–2025
- Constituency: Gothenburg Municipality

Personal details
- Born: 7 August 1985 (age 40) Falkenberg, Sweden
- Party: Moderate (from 2025)
- Other political affiliations: Liberal (until 2025)

Robert Hannah (born 7 August 1985) is a former Swedish Liberal politician and member of the Riksdag for Gothenburg Municipality between 2014 and 2025. In the 2014 election he was number 5 on the Liberal list but selected for the only Liberal seat through personal votes. After the 2022 election Hannah served as the vice-chairman of the parliamentary committee on culture. In 2025 he announced his departure from parliament and the Liberal party.

On 13 February 2025 Hannah announced his resignation from parliament and departure from the Liberals. In a post on X he stated that he had joined the Moderates in the Stockholm suburb of Nacka.

Hannah is of Assyrian descent and grew up in the Gothenburg boroughs of Tynnered and Gårdsten. He is openly gay and has among other issues focused on integration as well as honor culture and the ways it affects LGBT people.
