= Örebro County (Riksdag constituency) =

Parliamentary constituency of Sweden

- Örebro Län
- Constituency for the Riksdag
- Location of Örebro County within Sweden
- County: Örebro
- Population: 308,362 (2025)
- Electorate: 238,804 (2026)
- Area: 9,678 km^{2} (2026)

Current constituency
- Created: 1970
- Seats: List (Note: Constituency seats only.): 9 (2010–present); 10 (1982–2010); 11 (1970–1982)
- Member of the Riksdag: List: Jimmie Åkesson (SD); Nadja Awad (V); Denis Begic (S); Hans Eklind (KD); Matilda Ernkrans (S); Camilla Hansén (MP); Tony Ring (M); Per Söderlund (SD); Karin Sundin (S); Willhelm Sundman (L); Oskar Svärd (M); Helena Vilhelmsson (C)
- Created from: Örebro County

Örebro County (Swedish: Örebro Län) is one of the 29 multi-member constituencies of the Riksdag, the national legislature of Sweden. The constituency was established in 1970 when the Riksdag changed from a bicameral legislature to a unicameral legislature. It is conterminous with the county of Örebro. The constituency currently elects nine of the 349 members of the Riksdag using the open party-list proportional representation electoral system. At the 2026 general election it had 238,804 registered electors.

== Electoral system ==
Örebro County currently elects nine of the 349 members of the Riksdag using the open party-list proportional representation electoral system. Constituency seats are allocated using the modified Sainte-Laguë method. Only parties that reach the 4% national threshold and parties that receive at least 12% of the vote in the constituency compete for constituency seats. Supplementary levelling seats may also be allocated at the constituency level to parties that reach the 4% national threshold.

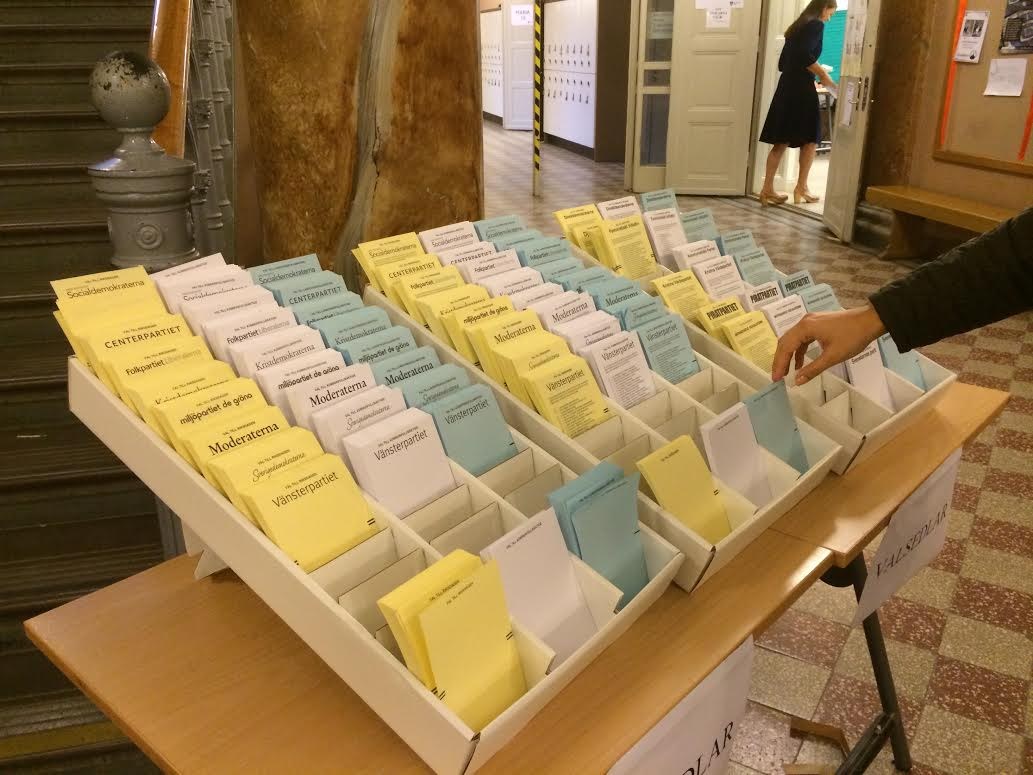
A selection of ballot papers available for voters at the 2014 general election in Stockholm - yellow for the Riksdag, blue for the regional council and white for the municipal council

Prior to 1997 voters could cast any ballot paper they wanted, though it had to contain the name of a party and the name of at least one candidate nominated by that party in the constituency. It was common for parties to hand out ballot papers with their name and list of candidates at the entrance of polling stations. Voters could delete the names of candidates or write-in the names of other candidates but in practice these options weren't used enough by voters to have any significant impact on the results and consequently elections operated as a closed system.

Since 1997, elections in Sweden follow the French model in having separate ballot papers for each party/list in a constituency. There are two ballot papers for each party - a party ballot paper (partivalsedel) with just the name of the party and a name ballot paper (namnvalsedel) with the name of the party and its list of candidates. There are also blank ballot papers (blank valsedel). Voters can initially pick as many ballot papers as they wish and then, in the secrecy of the voting booth, they select a single ballot paper of their choice. If they chose a name ballot paper they have the option of casting a preferential vote for one of their chosen party's candidates. If they chose a blank ballot paper they can write the name of any party including unregistered parties and, optionally, they can write the name of any person as their preferred candidate, even one that does not belong to their chosen party. They then place their chosen ballot paper in an envelope which is placed in the ballot box, discarding all other ballot papers they picked.

Seats won by each party/list in a constituency are allocated to its candidates in order of preference votes (a personal mandate), provided that the candidate has received at least 8% of votes cast for their party in the constituency (5% since January 2011). Any unfilled seats are then allocated to the party's remaining candidates in the order they appear on the party list (a party mandate).

== Election results ==
=== Summary ===
| Election | Left V / VPK | | | Social Democrats S | | | Greens MP | | | Centre C | | | Liberals L / FP / F | | | Moderates M | | | Christian Democrats KD / KDS | | | Sweden Democrats SD | | |
| Election | Votes | % | Seats | Votes | % | Seats | Votes | % | Seats | Votes | % | Seats | Votes | % | Seats | Votes | % | Seats | Votes | % | Seats | Votes | % | Seats |
|---|---|---|---|---|---|---|---|---|---|---|---|---|---|---|---|---|---|---|---|---|---|---|---|---|
| 2026 | 15,874 | 7.82% | 1 | 61,609 | 30.35% | 3 | 9,901 | 4.88% | 0 | 11,605 | 5.72% | 0 | 9,000 | 4.43% | 0 | 35,795 | 17.63% | 2 | 12,589 | 6.20% | 1 | 36,056 | 17.76% | 2 |
| 2022 | 11,873 | 6.11% | 1 | 64,565 | 33.25% | 3 | 7,866 | 4.05% | 0 | 12,159 | 6.26% | 1 | 8,828 | 4.55% | 0 | 32,508 | 16.74% | 2 | 10,368 | 5.34% | 0 | 42,904 | 22.09% | 2 |
| 2018 | 14,775 | 7.57% | 1 | 64,646 | 33.13% | 3 | 7,189 | 3.68% | 0 | 15,254 | 7.82% | 1 | 8,888 | 4.55% | 0 | 32,470 | 16.64% | 1 | 13,520 | 6.93% | 1 | 35,499 | 18.19% | 2 |
| 2014 | 10,183 | 5.40% | 0 | 69,604 | 36.89% | 4 | 12,013 | 6.37% | 1 | 10,546 | 5.59% | 0 | 8,053 | 4.27% | 0 | 35,070 | 18.58% | 2 | 9,771 | 5.18% | 0 | 27,126 | 14.37% | 2 |
| 2010 | 10,311 | 5.65% | 0 | 70,818 | 38.83% | 4 | 11,846 | 6.50% | 1 | 9,807 | 5.38% | 0 | 11,415 | 6.26% | 1 | 43,791 | 24.01% | 3 | 11,235 | 6.16% | 0 | 11,136 | 6.11% | 0 |
| 2006 | 10,408 | 6.08% | 0 | 73,854 | 43.11% | 5 | 7,833 | 4.57% | 0 | 12,781 | 7.46% | 1 | 11,340 | 6.62% | 1 | 32,222 | 18.81% | 2 | 12,290 | 7.17% | 1 | 6,522 | 3.81% | 0 |
| 2002 | 14,877 | 8.93% | 1 | 77,535 | 46.54% | 5 | 6,951 | 4.17% | 0 | 10,679 | 6.41% | 1 | 18,737 | 11.25% | 1 | 17,908 | 10.75% | 1 | 15,046 | 9.03% | 1 | 2,859 | 1.72% | 0 |
| 1998 | 22,660 | 13.62% | 2 | 69,967 | 42.05% | 5 | 7,187 | 4.32% | 0 | 8,305 | 4.99% | 0 | 7,937 | 4.77% | 0 | 27,808 | 16.71% | 2 | 18,732 | 11.26% | 1 | | | |
| 1994 | 12,712 | 7.12% | 1 | 90,815 | 50.84% | 5 | 8,178 | 4.58% | 0 | 12,246 | 6.86% | 1 | 13,246 | 7.42% | 1 | 29,043 | 16.26% | 2 | 8,862 | 4.96% | 0 | | | |
| 1991 | 9,195 | 5.18% | 0 | 77,241 | 43.53% | 5 | 4,916 | 2.77% | 0 | 13,875 | 7.82% | 1 | 16,725 | 9.43% | 1 | 27,803 | 15.67% | 2 | 14,753 | 8.31% | 1 | | | |
| 1988 | 11,530 | 6.55% | 1 | 86,312 | 49.04% | 6 | 7,826 | 4.45% | 0 | 18,857 | 10.71% | 1 | 21,603 | 12.27% | 1 | 22,470 | 12.77% | 1 | 6,295 | 3.58% | 0 | | | |
| 1985 | 10,016 | 5.44% | 0 | 93,081 | 50.58% | 6 | 2,917 | 1.59% | 0 | 23,142 | 12.58% | 1 | 24,927 | 13.55% | 1 | 28,608 | 15.55% | 2 | with C | | | | | |
| 1982 | 10,058 | 5.42% | 0 | 96,940 | 52.21% | 6 | 2,831 | 1.52% | 0 | 27,659 | 14.90% | 2 | 10,445 | 5.63% | 0 | 32,337 | 17.41% | 2 | 5,118 | 2.76% | 0 | | | |
| 1979 | 9,645 | 5.27% | 0 | 89,989 | 49.16% | 6 | | | | 32,718 | 17.87% | 2 | 18,288 | 9.99% | 1 | 27,299 | 14.91% | 2 | 3,641 | 1.99% | 0 | | | |
| 1976 | 7,904 | 4.28% | 0 | 89,994 | 48.72% | 6 | | | | 44,373 | 24.02% | 3 | 18,538 | 10.04% | 1 | 19,881 | 10.76% | 1 | 3,216 | 1.74% | 0 | | | |
| 1973 | 8,495 | 4.79% | 0 | 88,232 | 49.76% | 6 | | | | 42,448 | 23.94% | 3 | 16,276 | 9.18% | 1 | 16,975 | 9.57% | 1 | 4,010 | 2.26% | 0 | | | |
| 1970 | 7,472 | 4.29% | 0 | 89,059 | 51.17% | 6 | | | | 34,952 | 20.08% | 2 | 24,890 | 14.30% | 2 | 13,143 | 7.55% | 1 | 3,752 | 2.16% | 0 | | | |

(Excludes levelling seats. Figures in italics represent alliances/joint lists.)

=== Detailed ===
Party has received at least 4% of the vote nationally and is entitled to compete for constituency seats.

==== 2020s ====
===== 2026 =====
Results of the 2026 general election held on 13 September 2026:

| Party | | Votes per municipality | | | | | | | | | | | | Total votes | % | Seats | | |
| Party | | Asker- sund | Deger- fors | Hälle- fors | Halls- berg | Karls- koga | Kumla | Laxå | Leke- berg | Lindes- berg | Ljusnars- berg | Nora | Örebro | Total votes | % | Con. | Lev. | Tot. |
|---|---|---|---|---|---|---|---|---|---|---|---|---|---|---|---|---|---|---|
| Swedish Social Democratic Party | S | 2,205 | 2,129 | 1,333 | 3,315 | 6,559 | 4,278 | 1,037 | 1,255 | 4,174 | 801 | 2,089 | 32,434 | 61,609 | 30.35% | 3 | 0 | 3 |
| Sweden Democrats | SD | 1,969 | 1,449 | 860 | 2,302 | 3,927 | 2,918 | 904 | 1,266 | 3,669 | 748 | 1,486 | 14,558 | 36,056 | 17.76% | 2 | 0 | 2 |
| Moderate Party | M | 1,297 | 910 | 555 | 1,593 | 4,419 | 2,673 | 509 | 1,119 | 2,475 | 454 | 1,174 | 18,617 | 35,795 | 17.63% | 2 | 0 | 2 |
| Left Party | V | 311 | 452 | 256 | 561 | 1,318 | 891 | 183 | 199 | 902 | 161 | 396 | 10,244 | 15,874 | 7.82% | 1 | 0 | 1 |
| Christian Democrats | KD | 573 | 358 | 196 | 576 | 958 | 1,005 | 291 | 483 | 895 | 126 | 405 | 6,723 | 12,589 | 6.20% | 1 | 0 | 1 |
| Centre Party | C | 476 | 215 | 159 | 544 | 713 | 787 | 217 | 485 | 786 | 87 | 400 | 6,736 | 11,605 | 5.72% | 0 | 1 | 1 |
| Green Party | MP | 300 | 159 | 133 | 364 | 602 | 468 | 105 | 231 | 590 | 66 | 403 | 6,480 | 9,901 | 4.88% | 0 | 1 | 1 |
| Örebro Party | ÖP | 347 | 259 | 216 | 496 | 792 | 635 | 148 | 281 | 721 | 139 | 290 | 4,727 | 9,051 | 4.46% | 0 | 0 | 0 |
| Liberals | L | 313 | 176 | 116 | 357 | 677 | 772 | 113 | 267 | 633 | 84 | 304 | 5,188 | 9,000 | 4.43% | 0 | 1 | 1 |
| Alternative for Sweden | AfS | 19 | 23 | 18 | 25 | 52 | 57 | 15 | 21 | 62 | 21 | 28 | 212 | 553 | 0.27% | 0 | 0 | 0 |
| Christian Values Party | KrVP | 10 | 5 | 0 | 20 | 13 | 25 | 7 | 14 | 15 | 5 | 8 | 178 | 300 | 0.15% | 0 | 0 | 0 |
| Pirate Party | PP | 1 | 1 | 4 | 3 | 18 | 11 | 1 | 6 | 8 | 1 | 6 | 125 | 185 | 0.09% | 0 | 0 | 0 |
| Ambition Sweden | AS | 22 | 17 | 7 | 9 | 9 | 6 | 7 | 6 | 20 | 4 | 6 | 54 | 167 | 0.08% | 0 | 0 | 0 |
| Independent Rural Party | LPo | 7 | 2 | 0 | 2 | 1 | 0 | 1 | 0 | 43 | 0 | 20 | 5 | 81 | 0.04% | 0 | 0 | 0 |
| Human Rights and Democracy | MoD | 4 | 0 | 2 | 2 | 1 | 4 | 2 | 2 | 9 | 2 | 3 | 31 | 62 | 0.03% | 0 | 0 | 0 |
| Citizens' Coalition | MED | 3 | 0 | 0 | 3 | 6 | 2 | 0 | 0 | 4 | 0 | 5 | 13 | 36 | 0.02% | 0 | 0 | 0 |
| United Voice | ER | 1 | 2 | 0 | 0 | 1 | 0 | 0 | 0 | 1 | 3 | 1 | 21 | 30 | 0.01% | 0 | 0 | 0 |
| Communist Party of Sweden | SKP | 2 | 3 | 0 | 0 | 3 | 0 | 1 | 0 | 1 | 2 | 0 | 12 | 24 | 0.01% | 0 | 0 | 0 |
| Direct Democrats | DD | 0 | 2 | 0 | 0 | 3 | 2 | 0 | 1 | 2 | 0 | 0 | 13 | 23 | 0.01% | 0 | 0 | 0 |
| Nuance Party | PNy | 0 | 0 | 0 | 0 | 1 | 0 | 0 | 0 | 1 | 0 | 0 | 16 | 18 | 0.01% | 0 | 0 | 0 |
| Nordic Resistance Movement | NMR | 0 | 0 | 0 | 1 | 1 | 0 | 1 | 2 | 0 | 0 | 0 | 5 | 10 | 0.00% | 0 | 0 | 0 |
| RegleraAI.nu | | 0 | 0 | 0 | 0 | 2 | 1 | 0 | 0 | 0 | 0 | 0 | 7 | 10 | 0.00% | 0 | 0 | 0 |
| Turning Point Party | PV | 0 | 0 | 1 | 0 | 1 | 0 | 0 | 0 | 2 | 0 | 0 | 3 | 7 | 0.00% | 0 | 0 | 0 |
| Communist Party | K | 0 | 0 | 0 | 0 | 0 | 0 | 0 | 0 | 0 | 0 | 2 | 4 | 6 | 0.00% | 0 | 0 | 0 |
| Unity | ENH | 0 | 0 | 1 | 1 | 0 | 0 | 0 | 0 | 2 | 0 | 0 | 2 | 6 | 0.00% | 0 | 0 | 0 |
| The Push Buttons | Kn | 0 | 1 | 0 | 0 | 0 | 0 | 0 | 1 | 0 | 0 | 0 | 1 | 3 | 0.00% | 0 | 0 | 0 |
| Donald Duck Party | | 0 | 0 | 0 | 1 | 0 | 1 | 0 | 0 | 0 | 0 | 0 | 0 | 2 | 0.00% | 0 | 0 | 0 |
| New Allance | | 0 | 0 | 1 | 0 | 1 | 0 | 0 | 0 | 0 | 0 | 0 | 0 | 2 | 0.00% | 0 | 0 | 0 |
| Volt Sweden | Volt | 0 | 0 | 0 | 0 | 0 | 0 | 0 | 0 | 0 | 0 | 0 | 2 | 2 | 0.00% | 0 | 0 | 0 |
| For the Good of All | | 0 | 0 | 0 | 0 | 0 | 0 | 0 | 0 | 0 | 0 | 0 | 1 | 1 | 0.00% | 0 | 0 | 0 |
| Lovely | | 0 | 0 | 0 | 0 | 0 | 0 | 0 | 0 | 1 | 0 | 0 | 0 | 1 | 0.00% | 0 | 0 | 0 |
| Peace and Freedom Parties | | 0 | 0 | 0 | 0 | 0 | 0 | 0 | 0 | 0 | 0 | 0 | 1 | 1 | 0.00% | 0 | 0 | 0 |
| Peace Team | | 0 | 0 | 0 | 0 | 0 | 0 | 0 | 0 | 0 | 0 | 1 | 0 | 1 | 0.00% | 0 | 0 | 0 |
| Presidency | | 0 | 0 | 0 | 0 | 1 | 0 | 0 | 0 | 0 | 0 | 0 | 0 | 1 | 0.00% | 0 | 0 | 0 |
| Squirrel Party | | 0 | 0 | 0 | 0 | 1 | 0 | 0 | 0 | 0 | 0 | 0 | 0 | 1 | 0.00% | 0 | 0 | 0 |
| Valid votes | | 7,860 | 6,163 | 3,858 | 10,175 | 20,080 | 14,536 | 3,542 | 5,639 | 15,016 | 2,704 | 7,027 | 106,413 | 203,013 | 100.00% | 9 | 3 | 12 |
| Blank votes | | 69 | 56 | 52 | 112 | 179 | 138 | 34 | 61 | 149 | 38 | 81 | 877 | 1,846 | 0.90% | | | |
| Rejected votes – unregistered parties | | 2 | 0 | 0 | 0 | 3 | 1 | 0 | 0 | 0 | 0 | 0 | 9 | 15 | 0.01% | | | |
| Rejected votes – other | | 4 | 4 | 1 | 4 | 14 | 50 | 3 | 1 | 22 | 3 | 1 | 62 | 169 | 0.08% | | | |
| Total polled | | 7,935 | 6,223 | 3,911 | 10,291 | 20,276 | 14,725 | 3,579 | 5,701 | 15,187 | 2,745 | 7,109 | 107,361 | 205,043 | 85.86% | | | |
| Registered electors | | 9,171 | 7,334 | 4,833 | 12,096 | 23,973 | 16,993 | 4,212 | 6,415 | 17,997 | 3,459 | 8,342 | 123,979 | 238,804 | | | | |
| Turnout | | 86.52% | 84.85% | 80.92% | 85.08% | 84.58% | 86.65% | 84.97% | 88.87% | 84.39% | 79.36% | 85.22% | 86.60% | 85.86% | | | | |

The following candidates were elected:

- Constituency seats (personal mandates) - Jimmie Åkesson (SD), 13,901 votes; Nadja Awad (V), 3,659 votes; Ebba Busch (KD), 3,902 votes; and Elisabeth Svantesson (M), 4,062 votes.
- Constituency seats (party mandates) - Denis Begic (S), 1,387 votes; Matilda Ernkrans (S), 2,972 votes; Per Söderlund (SD), 142 votes; Karin Sundin (S), 703 votes; and Oskar Svärd (M), 1,261 votes.
- Levelling seats (personal mandates) - Camilla Hansén (MP), 557 votes; and Helena Vilhelmsson (C), 660 votes.
- Levelling seats (party mandates) - Willhelm Sundman (L), 186 votes.

===== 2022 =====
Results of the 2022 general election held on 11 September 2022:

| Party | | Votes per municipality | | | | | | | | | | | | Total votes | % | Seats | | |
| Party | | Asker- sund | Deger- fors | Hälle- fors | Halls- berg | Karls- koga | Kumla | Laxå | Leke- berg | Lindes- berg | Ljusnars- berg | Nora | Örebro | Total votes | % | Con. | Lev. | Tot. |
|---|---|---|---|---|---|---|---|---|---|---|---|---|---|---|---|---|---|---|
| Swedish Social Democratic Party | S | 2,504 | 2,482 | 1,537 | 3,575 | 7,339 | 4,700 | 1,253 | 1,418 | 4,544 | 934 | 2,316 | 31,963 | 64,565 | 33.25% | 3 | 0 | 3 |
| Sweden Democrats | SD | 2,317 | 1,666 | 1,185 | 2,744 | 4,645 | 3,618 | 1,115 | 1,540 | 4,534 | 992 | 1,814 | 16,734 | 42,904 | 22.09% | 2 | 0 | 2 |
| Moderate Party | M | 1,223 | 750 | 524 | 1,480 | 3,712 | 2,444 | 445 | 965 | 2,337 | 390 | 1,052 | 17,186 | 32,508 | 16.74% | 2 | 0 | 2 |
| Centre Party | C | 505 | 244 | 170 | 613 | 796 | 787 | 186 | 533 | 901 | 86 | 424 | 6,914 | 12,159 | 6.26% | 1 | 0 | 1 |
| Left Party | V | 262 | 485 | 237 | 480 | 986 | 602 | 173 | 199 | 767 | 155 | 332 | 7,195 | 11,873 | 6.11% | 1 | 0 | 1 |
| Christian Democrats | KD | 438 | 260 | 126 | 465 | 772 | 788 | 227 | 451 | 811 | 118 | 396 | 5,516 | 10,368 | 5.34% | 0 | 1 | 1 |
| Liberals | L | 219 | 143 | 84 | 292 | 593 | 670 | 105 | 211 | 405 | 50 | 261 | 5,795 | 8,828 | 4.55% | 0 | 1 | 1 |
| Green Party | MP | 231 | 148 | 106 | 296 | 513 | 362 | 77 | 190 | 489 | 55 | 306 | 5,093 | 7,866 | 4.05% | 0 | 1 | 1 |
| Nuance Party | PNy | 16 | 7 | 4 | 7 | 57 | 29 | 12 | 2 | 26 | 11 | 9 | 626 | 806 | 0.42% | 0 | 0 | 0 |
| Alternative for Sweden | AfS | 30 | 23 | 11 | 33 | 60 | 33 | 9 | 21 | 63 | 16 | 15 | 213 | 527 | 0.27% | 0 | 0 | 0 |
| Citizens' Coalition | MED | 17 | 7 | 5 | 21 | 24 | 22 | 2 | 9 | 22 | 12 | 17 | 193 | 351 | 0.18% | 0 | 0 | 0 |
| Pirate Party | PP | 13 | 6 | 5 | 8 | 23 | 9 | 2 | 1 | 21 | 3 | 11 | 203 | 305 | 0.16% | 0 | 0 | 0 |
| Christian Values Party | KrVP | 8 | 1 | 0 | 25 | 14 | 18 | 8 | 21 | 26 | 2 | 8 | 134 | 265 | 0.14% | 0 | 0 | 0 |
| The Push Buttons | Kn | 13 | 14 | 4 | 8 | 16 | 19 | 3 | 11 | 23 | 1 | 8 | 75 | 195 | 0.10% | 0 | 0 | 0 |
| Independent Rural Party | LPo | 12 | 4 | 9 | 8 | 8 | 6 | 5 | 10 | 43 | 7 | 45 | 34 | 191 | 0.10% | 0 | 0 | 0 |
| Human Rights and Democracy | MoD | 7 | 14 | 3 | 6 | 17 | 13 | 7 | 6 | 19 | 3 | 2 | 82 | 179 | 0.09% | 0 | 0 | 0 |
| Feminist Initiative | FI | 1 | 1 | 3 | 5 | 3 | 9 | 0 | 0 | 5 | 1 | 1 | 41 | 70 | 0.04% | 0 | 0 | 0 |
| Climate Alliance | KA | 0 | 0 | 1 | 0 | 3 | 4 | 1 | 2 | 5 | 0 | 10 | 31 | 57 | 0.03% | 0 | 0 | 0 |
| Direct Democrats | DD | 1 | 0 | 0 | 1 | 6 | 3 | 0 | 2 | 2 | 0 | 1 | 28 | 44 | 0.02% | 0 | 0 | 0 |
| Unity | ENH | 0 | 1 | 0 | 3 | 2 | 0 | 0 | 5 | 4 | 2 | 3 | 12 | 32 | 0.02% | 0 | 0 | 0 |
| Nordic Resistance Movement | NMR | 0 | 1 | 2 | 2 | 4 | 0 | 1 | 1 | 2 | 1 | 0 | 16 | 30 | 0.02% | 0 | 0 | 0 |
| Communist Party of Sweden | SKP | 0 | 2 | 0 | 0 | 2 | 0 | 0 | 0 | 2 | 0 | 0 | 5 | 11 | 0.01% | 0 | 0 | 0 |
| Classical Liberal Party | KLP | 0 | 0 | 0 | 0 | 1 | 2 | 0 | 0 | 1 | 0 | 0 | 6 | 10 | 0.01% | 0 | 0 | 0 |
| Turning Point Party | PV | 0 | 0 | 0 | 0 | 3 | 1 | 2 | 0 | 0 | 0 | 0 | 4 | 10 | 0.01% | 0 | 0 | 0 |
| Basic Income Party | BASIP | 0 | 2 | 0 | 0 | 1 | 1 | 0 | 0 | 0 | 0 | 0 | 2 | 6 | 0.00% | 0 | 0 | 0 |
| Socialist Welfare Party | S-V | 0 | 0 | 0 | 0 | 0 | 0 | 0 | 0 | 0 | 3 | 0 | 2 | 5 | 0.00% | 0 | 0 | 0 |
| Hard Line Sweden | | 0 | 0 | 0 | 0 | 1 | 0 | 0 | 0 | 0 | 0 | 0 | 3 | 4 | 0.00% | 0 | 0 | 0 |
| Volt Sweden | Volt | 0 | 0 | 0 | 0 | 0 | 0 | 0 | 0 | 0 | 3 | 0 | 1 | 4 | 0.00% | 0 | 0 | 0 |
| Evil Chicken Party | OKP | 0 | 0 | 0 | 0 | 0 | 0 | 0 | 0 | 0 | 0 | 0 | 3 | 3 | 0.00% | 0 | 0 | 0 |
| United Democratic Party | | 0 | 0 | 0 | 0 | 0 | 0 | 0 | 0 | 0 | 0 | 0 | 3 | 3 | 0.00% | 0 | 0 | 0 |
| Freedom Movement | | 0 | 0 | 0 | 1 | 0 | 0 | 0 | 0 | 0 | 0 | 0 | 1 | 2 | 0.00% | 0 | 0 | 0 |
| Sweden Out of the EU/ Free Justice Party | FRP | 0 | 0 | 0 | 0 | 2 | 0 | 0 | 0 | 0 | 0 | 0 | 0 | 2 | 0.00% | 0 | 0 | 0 |
| Freedom Party | | 0 | 0 | 0 | 0 | 1 | 0 | 0 | 0 | 0 | 0 | 0 | 0 | 1 | 0.00% | 0 | 0 | 0 |
| Now That Will Be Enough | | 0 | 0 | 0 | 0 | 0 | 0 | 0 | 0 | 1 | 0 | 0 | 0 | 1 | 0.00% | 0 | 0 | 0 |
| Political Shift | | 0 | 0 | 0 | 0 | 0 | 1 | 0 | 0 | 0 | 0 | 0 | 0 | 1 | 0.00% | 0 | 0 | 0 |
| Swexit Party | | 0 | 0 | 0 | 0 | 0 | 0 | 0 | 0 | 0 | 0 | 0 | 1 | 1 | 0.00% | 0 | 0 | 0 |
| Valid votes | | 7,817 | 6,261 | 4,016 | 10,073 | 19,604 | 14,141 | 3,633 | 5,598 | 15,053 | 2,845 | 7,031 | 98,115 | 194,187 | 100.00% | 9 | 3 | 12 |
| Blank votes | | 93 | 62 | 66 | 125 | 226 | 150 | 43 | 80 | 176 | 41 | 90 | 1,017 | 2,169 | 1.10% | | | |
| Rejected votes – unregistered parties | | 1 | 1 | 0 | 2 | 3 | 1 | 0 | 1 | 2 | 0 | 2 | 10 | 23 | 0.01% | | | |
| Rejected votes – other | | 3 | 8 | 5 | 7 | 12 | 9 | 4 | 0 | 5 | 4 | 3 | 62 | 122 | 0.06% | | | |
| Total polled | | 7,914 | 6,332 | 4,087 | 10,207 | 19,845 | 14,301 | 3,680 | 5,679 | 15,236 | 2,890 | 7,126 | 99,204 | 196,501 | 84.69% | | | |
| Registered electors | | 9,144 | 7,456 | 5,010 | 11,930 | 23,534 | 16,456 | 4,312 | 6,359 | 18,038 | 3,568 | 8,277 | 117,940 | 232,024 | | | | |
| Turnout | | 86.55% | 84.92% | 81.58% | 85.56% | 84.32% | 86.90% | 85.34% | 89.31% | 84.47% | 81.00% | 86.09% | 84.11% | 84.69% | | | | |

The following candidates were elected:

- Constituency seats (personal mandates) - Nadja Awad (V), 804 votes; Elisabeth Svantesson (M), 1,830 votes; and Helena Vilhelmsson (C), 644 votes.
- Constituency seats (party mandates) - Denis Begic (S), 1,025 votes; Matilda Ernkrans (S), 2,823 votes; Michael Rubbestad (SD), 1 vote; Per Söderlund (SD), 189 votes; Karin Sundin (S), 670 votes; and Oskar Svärd (M), 877 votes.
- Levelling seats (personal mandates) - Hans Eklind (KD), 607 votes; Camilla Hansén (MP), 432 votes; and Johan Pehrson (L), 1,547 votes.

Permanent substitutions:

- Johan Pehrson (L) resigned on 27 June 2025 and was replaced by Elin Nilsson (L) on 28 June 2025.
- Michael Rubbestad (SD) resigned on 3 June 2026 and was replaced by Daniel Spiik (SD) on the same day.

==== 2010s ====
===== 2018 =====
Results of the 2018 general election held on 9 September 2018:

| Party | | Votes per municipality | | | | | | | | | | | | Total votes | % | Seats | | |
| Party | | Asker- sund | Deger- fors | Hälle- fors | Halls- berg | Karls- koga | Kumla | Laxå | Leke- berg | Lindes- berg | Ljusnars- berg | Nora | Örebro | Total votes | % | Con. | Lev. | Tot. |
|---|---|---|---|---|---|---|---|---|---|---|---|---|---|---|---|---|---|---|
| Swedish Social Democratic Party | S | 2,514 | 2,827 | 1,704 | 3,763 | 7,469 | 4,540 | 1,300 | 1,369 | 4,823 | 1,015 | 2,334 | 30,988 | 64,646 | 33.13% | 3 | 0 | 3 |
| Sweden Democrats | SD | 1,821 | 1,275 | 1,058 | 2,214 | 3,650 | 2,940 | 885 | 1,264 | 3,823 | 936 | 1,482 | 14,151 | 35,499 | 18.19% | 2 | 0 | 2 |
| Moderate Party | M | 1,286 | 683 | 510 | 1,410 | 3,578 | 2,353 | 440 | 830 | 2,408 | 340 | 1,016 | 17,616 | 32,470 | 16.64% | 1 | 1 | 2 |
| Centre Party | C | 718 | 343 | 259 | 808 | 1,199 | 984 | 235 | 698 | 1,298 | 179 | 614 | 7,919 | 15,254 | 7.82% | 1 | 0 | 1 |
| Left Party | V | 426 | 653 | 385 | 669 | 1,425 | 783 | 253 | 279 | 929 | 209 | 439 | 8,325 | 14,775 | 7.57% | 1 | 0 | 1 |
| Christian Democrats | KD | 528 | 257 | 145 | 600 | 964 | 1,113 | 346 | 460 | 924 | 126 | 436 | 7,621 | 13,520 | 6.93% | 1 | 0 | 1 |
| Liberals | L | 238 | 154 | 90 | 325 | 792 | 697 | 103 | 160 | 434 | 80 | 250 | 5,565 | 8,888 | 4.55% | 0 | 1 | 1 |
| Green Party | MP | 180 | 152 | 79 | 264 | 557 | 377 | 60 | 144 | 393 | 57 | 234 | 4,692 | 7,189 | 3.68% | 0 | 1 | 1 |
| Feminist Initiative | FI | 16 | 22 | 7 | 27 | 44 | 50 | 17 | 15 | 47 | 10 | 40 | 484 | 779 | 0.40% | 0 | 0 | 0 |
| Alternative for Sweden | AfS | 16 | 23 | 18 | 34 | 90 | 33 | 12 | 21 | 48 | 14 | 19 | 271 | 599 | 0.31% | 0 | 0 | 0 |
| Citizens' Coalition | MED | 9 | 5 | 5 | 22 | 21 | 14 | 4 | 9 | 32 | 5 | 9 | 201 | 336 | 0.17% | 0 | 0 | 0 |
| Pirate Party | PP | 6 | 1 | 7 | 12 | 46 | 27 | 0 | 0 | 8 | 4 | 3 | 158 | 272 | 0.14% | 0 | 0 | 0 |
| Independent Rural Party | LPo | 38 | 4 | 11 | 21 | 7 | 4 | 4 | 8 | 53 | 13 | 29 | 26 | 218 | 0.11% | 0 | 0 | 0 |
| Christian Values Party | KrVP | 0 | 2 | 0 | 7 | 9 | 9 | 0 | 7 | 10 | 0 | 0 | 129 | 173 | 0.09% | 0 | 0 | 0 |
| Unity | ENH | 8 | 2 | 3 | 4 | 10 | 6 | 1 | 16 | 16 | 3 | 6 | 80 | 155 | 0.08% | 0 | 0 | 0 |
| Direct Democrats | DD | 6 | 6 | 3 | 5 | 14 | 4 | 1 | 3 | 10 | 1 | 7 | 72 | 132 | 0.07% | 0 | 0 | 0 |
| Animals' Party | DjuP | 3 | 3 | 2 | 5 | 12 | 7 | 1 | 4 | 6 | 1 | 4 | 35 | 83 | 0.04% | 0 | 0 | 0 |
| Nordic Resistance Movement | NMR | 5 | 2 | 0 | 3 | 9 | 1 | 3 | 1 | 12 | 5 | 0 | 23 | 64 | 0.03% | 0 | 0 | 0 |
| Classical Liberal Party | KLP | 0 | 1 | 1 | 1 | 0 | 3 | 0 | 1 | 1 | 0 | 0 | 30 | 38 | 0.02% | 0 | 0 | 0 |
| Basic Income Party | BASIP | 0 | 0 | 0 | 5 | 0 | 3 | 0 | 1 | 4 | 0 | 0 | 10 | 23 | 0.01% | 0 | 0 | 0 |
| Communist Party of Sweden | SKP | 0 | 0 | 0 | 0 | 1 | 0 | 0 | 0 | 0 | 2 | 0 | 14 | 17 | 0.01% | 0 | 0 | 0 |
| Initiative | INI | 0 | 0 | 0 | 1 | 0 | 0 | 0 | 0 | 0 | 0 | 0 | 9 | 10 | 0.01% | 0 | 0 | 0 |
| NY Reform | NYREF | 0 | 0 | 0 | 0 | 0 | 0 | 0 | 0 | 0 | 0 | 0 | 1 | 1 | 0.00% | 0 | 0 | 0 |
| Parties not on the ballot | ÖVR | 0 | 0 | 2 | 0 | 2 | 0 | 0 | 3 | 1 | 0 | 0 | 8 | 16 | 0.01% | 0 | 0 | 0 |
| Valid votes | | 7,818 | 6,415 | 4,289 | 10,200 | 19,899 | 13,948 | 3,665 | 5,293 | 15,280 | 3,000 | 6,922 | 98,428 | 195,157 | 100.00% | 9 | 3 | 12 |
| Blank votes | | 74 | 56 | 46 | 100 | 196 | 168 | 36 | 64 | 169 | 27 | 69 | 791 | 1,796 | 0.91% | | | |
| Rejected votes – unregistered parties | | 1 | 2 | 1 | 4 | 5 | 6 | 0 | 4 | 2 | 3 | 2 | 25 | 55 | 0.03% | | | |
| Rejected votes – other | | 2 | 4 | 1 | 5 | 6 | 7 | 1 | 1 | 8 | 0 | 1 | 56 | 92 | 0.05% | | | |
| Total polled | | 7,895 | 6,477 | 4,337 | 10,309 | 20,106 | 14,129 | 3,702 | 5,362 | 15,459 | 3,030 | 6,994 | 99,300 | 197,100 | 87.67% | | | |
| Registered electors | | 8,916 | 7,436 | 5,160 | 11,634 | 23,097 | 15,951 | 4,263 | 5,903 | 17,648 | 3,622 | 8,051 | 113,130 | 224,811 | | | | |
| Turnout | | 88.55% | 87.10% | 84.05% | 88.61% | 87.05% | 88.58% | 86.84% | 90.84% | 87.60% | 83.66% | 86.87% | 87.78% | 87.67% | | | | |

The following candidates were elected:

- Constituency seats (personal mandates) - Hans Eklind (KD), 1,038 votes; Lena Rådström Baastad (S), 4,795 votes; Elisabeth Svantesson (M), 2,396 votes; and Helena Vilhelmsson (C), 767 votes.
- Constituency seats (party mandates) - Denis Begic (S), 1,001 votes; Matilda Ernkrans (S), 1,144 votes; David Lång (SD), 0 votes; Jonas Millard (SD), 158 votes; and Mia Sydow Mölleby (V), 735 votes.
- Levelling seats (personal mandates) - Johan Pehrson (L), 739 votes.
- Levelling seats (party mandates) - Jonas Eriksson (MP), 332 votes; and Lotta Olsson (M), 373 votes.

Permanent substitutions:

- Jonas Millard (SD) resigned on 31 January 2019 and was replaced by Per Söderlund (SD) on 1 February 2019.
- Jonas Eriksson (MP) resigned on 3 November 2019 and was replaced by Camilla Hansén (MP) on 4 November 2019.
- Lena Rådström Baastad (S) resigned on 2 September 2021 and was replaced by Daniel Andersson (S) on 3 September 2021.

===== 2014 =====
Results of the 2014 general election held on 14 September 2014:

| Party | | Votes per municipality | | | | | | | | | | | | Total votes | % | Seats | | |
| Party | | Asker- sund | Deger- fors | Hälle- fors | Halls- berg | Karls- koga | Kumla | Laxå | Leke- berg | Lindes- berg | Ljusnars- berg | Nora | Örebro | Total votes | % | Con. | Lev. | Tot. |
|---|---|---|---|---|---|---|---|---|---|---|---|---|---|---|---|---|---|---|
| Swedish Social Democratic Party | S | 2,906 | 3,287 | 2,078 | 4,485 | 8,878 | 5,165 | 1,649 | 1,480 | 5,670 | 1,314 | 2,734 | 29,958 | 69,604 | 36.89% | 4 | 0 | 4 |
| Moderate Party | M | 1,330 | 679 | 568 | 1,505 | 3,713 | 2,430 | 518 | 835 | 2,587 | 385 | 1,132 | 19,388 | 35,070 | 18.58% | 2 | 0 | 2 |
| Sweden Democrats | SD | 1,355 | 927 | 790 | 1,713 | 2,858 | 2,198 | 679 | 897 | 3,204 | 743 | 1,068 | 10,694 | 27,126 | 14.37% | 2 | 0 | 2 |
| Green Party | MP | 317 | 259 | 138 | 447 | 947 | 672 | 122 | 210 | 714 | 103 | 353 | 7,731 | 12,013 | 6.37% | 1 | 0 | 1 |
| Centre Party | C | 650 | 268 | 205 | 635 | 682 | 684 | 209 | 663 | 1,144 | 161 | 519 | 4,726 | 10,546 | 5.59% | 0 | 0 | 0 |
| Left Party | V | 338 | 520 | 289 | 519 | 993 | 578 | 207 | 210 | 662 | 208 | 377 | 5,282 | 10,183 | 5.40% | 0 | 1 | 1 |
| Christian Democrats | KD | 335 | 219 | 92 | 446 | 719 | 783 | 203 | 334 | 568 | 68 | 268 | 5,736 | 9,771 | 5.18% | 0 | 1 | 1 |
| Liberal People's Party | FP | 238 | 123 | 95 | 300 | 653 | 675 | 110 | 155 | 433 | 72 | 244 | 4,955 | 8,053 | 4.27% | 0 | 1 | 1 |
| Feminist Initiative | FI | 120 | 97 | 84 | 162 | 256 | 235 | 34 | 95 | 225 | 43 | 146 | 3,070 | 4,567 | 2.42% | 0 | 0 | 0 |
| Pirate Party | PP | 18 | 23 | 15 | 32 | 72 | 70 | 7 | 11 | 47 | 13 | 14 | 378 | 700 | 0.37% | 0 | 0 | 0 |
| Independent Rural Party | LBPo | 29 | 4 | 27 | 10 | 11 | 2 | 13 | 21 | 32 | 8 | 26 | 37 | 220 | 0.12% | 0 | 0 | 0 |
| Animals' Party | DjuP | 11 | 4 | 10 | 7 | 14 | 5 | 1 | 6 | 7 | 1 | 3 | 134 | 203 | 0.11% | 0 | 0 | 0 |
| Unity | ENH | 8 | 4 | 3 | 6 | 16 | 9 | 3 | 13 | 17 | 3 | 18 | 96 | 196 | 0.10% | 0 | 0 | 0 |
| Christian Values Party | KrVP | 1 | 0 | 0 | 4 | 2 | 6 | 1 | 4 | 3 | 1 | 3 | 104 | 129 | 0.07% | 0 | 0 | 0 |
| Party of the Swedes | SVP | 3 | 7 | 2 | 3 | 15 | 3 | 3 | 1 | 19 | 4 | 13 | 42 | 115 | 0.06% | 0 | 0 | 0 |
| Classical Liberal Party | KLP | 1 | 0 | 0 | 0 | 1 | 1 | 0 | 2 | 1 | 0 | 0 | 34 | 40 | 0.02% | 0 | 0 | 0 |
| Swedish Senior Citizen Interest Party | SPI | 2 | 0 | 0 | 0 | 33 | 0 | 0 | 0 | 0 | 0 | 0 | 0 | 35 | 0.02% | 0 | 0 | 0 |
| Direct Democrats | | 0 | 0 | 1 | 2 | 6 | 3 | 0 | 0 | 1 | 0 | 3 | 15 | 31 | 0.02% | 0 | 0 | 0 |
| Progressive Party | | 2 | 1 | 0 | 2 | 2 | 2 | 0 | 0 | 9 | 2 | 1 | 6 | 27 | 0.01% | 0 | 0 | 0 |
| Communist Party of Sweden | SKP | 0 | 0 | 0 | 0 | 1 | 1 | 0 | 0 | 0 | 0 | 1 | 12 | 15 | 0.01% | 0 | 0 | 0 |
| Health Party | | 0 | 0 | 1 | 0 | 0 | 0 | 0 | 1 | 0 | 0 | 0 | 3 | 5 | 0.00% | 0 | 0 | 0 |
| Socialist Justice Party | RS | 0 | 0 | 0 | 1 | 1 | 0 | 0 | 0 | 0 | 0 | 0 | 2 | 4 | 0.00% | 0 | 0 | 0 |
| European Workers Party | EAP | 0 | 0 | 0 | 0 | 0 | 0 | 0 | 0 | 1 | 0 | 0 | 0 | 1 | 0.00% | 0 | 0 | 0 |
| Peace Democrats | | 0 | 0 | 0 | 0 | 0 | 0 | 0 | 0 | 0 | 1 | 0 | 0 | 1 | 0.00% | 0 | 0 | 0 |
| Parties not on the ballot | | 0 | 4 | 0 | 1 | 4 | 7 | 1 | 1 | 4 | 0 | 1 | 26 | 49 | 0.03% | 0 | 0 | 0 |
| Valid votes | | 7,664 | 6,426 | 4,398 | 10,280 | 19,877 | 13,529 | 3,760 | 4,939 | 15,348 | 3,130 | 6,924 | 92,429 | 188,704 | 100.00% | 9 | 3 | 12 |
| Blank votes | | 80 | 57 | 35 | 112 | 173 | 163 | 38 | 61 | 134 | 43 | 71 | 891 | 1,858 | 0.97% | | | |
| Rejected votes – other | | 3 | 3 | 0 | 1 | 6 | 16 | 1 | 0 | 0 | 2 | 2 | 49 | 83 | 0.04% | | | |
| Total polled | | 7,747 | 6,486 | 4,433 | 10,393 | 20,056 | 13,708 | 3,799 | 5,000 | 15,482 | 3,175 | 6,997 | 93,369 | 190,645 | 86.69% | | | |
| Registered electors | | 8,938 | 7,509 | 5,373 | 11,773 | 23,406 | 15,637 | 4,425 | 5,655 | 17,831 | 3,795 | 8,144 | 107,436 | 219,922 | | | | |
| Turnout | | 86.67% | 86.38% | 82.51% | 88.28% | 85.69% | 87.66% | 85.85% | 88.42% | 86.83% | 83.66% | 85.92% | 86.91% | 86.69% | | | | |

The following candidates were elected:

- Constituency seats (personal mandates) - Elisabeth Svantesson (M), 1,896 votes.
- Constituency seats (party mandates) - Lennart Axelsson (S), 799 votes; Håkan Bergman (S), 315 votes; Sara-Lena Bjälkö (SD), 0 votes; Jonas Eriksson (MP), 568 votes; Matilda Ernkrans (S), 2,945 votes; Eva-Lena Jansson (S), 1,916 votes; David Lång (SD), 7 votes; and Lotta Olsson (M), 831 votes.
- Levelling seats (personal mandates) - Lars-Axel Nordell (KD), 905 votes; Johan Pehrson (FP), 921 votes; and Mia Sydow Mölleby (V), 619 votes.

Permanent substitutions:

- Johan Pehrson (FP) resigned on 19 April 2015 and was replaced by Christina Örnebjär (FP) on 20 April 2015.

===== 2010 =====
Results of the 2010 general election held on 19 September 2010:

| Party | | Votes per municipality | | | | | | | | | | | | Total votes | % | Seats | | |
| Party | | Asker- sund | Deger- fors | Hälle- fors | Halls- berg | Karls- koga | Kumla | Laxå | Leke- berg | Lindes- berg | Ljusnars- berg | Nora | Örebro | Total votes | % | Con. | Lev. | Tot. |
|---|---|---|---|---|---|---|---|---|---|---|---|---|---|---|---|---|---|---|
| Swedish Social Democratic Party | S | 3,002 | 3,423 | 2,332 | 4,463 | 9,062 | 5,354 | 1,887 | 1,463 | 5,732 | 1,406 | 2,725 | 29,969 | 70,818 | 38.83% | 4 | 0 | 4 |
| Moderate Party | M | 1,949 | 898 | 812 | 2,058 | 4,547 | 3,045 | 750 | 1,179 | 3,495 | 615 | 1,631 | 22,812 | 43,791 | 24.01% | 3 | 0 | 3 |
| Green Party | MP | 377 | 319 | 203 | 484 | 1,058 | 610 | 115 | 253 | 773 | 142 | 412 | 7,100 | 11,846 | 6.50% | 1 | 0 | 1 |
| Liberal People's Party | FP | 376 | 204 | 165 | 477 | 1,036 | 821 | 199 | 208 | 741 | 102 | 433 | 6,653 | 11,415 | 6.26% | 1 | 0 | 1 |
| Christian Democrats | KD | 458 | 295 | 114 | 524 | 937 | 900 | 244 | 422 | 718 | 113 | 371 | 6,139 | 11,235 | 6.16% | 0 | 1 | 1 |
| Sweden Democrats | SD | 443 | 349 | 330 | 663 | 910 | 943 | 212 | 358 | 1,368 | 305 | 389 | 4,866 | 11,136 | 6.11% | 0 | 1 | 1 |
| Left Party | V | 352 | 700 | 329 | 585 | 1,037 | 543 | 198 | 212 | 685 | 251 | 301 | 5,118 | 10,311 | 5.65% | 0 | 1 | 1 |
| Centre Party | C | 615 | 264 | 215 | 622 | 612 | 672 | 219 | 615 | 1,183 | 175 | 417 | 4,198 | 9,807 | 5.38% | 0 | 0 | 0 |
| Pirate Party | PP | 34 | 21 | 33 | 49 | 85 | 95 | 17 | 29 | 96 | 23 | 40 | 527 | 1,049 | 0.58% | 0 | 0 | 0 |
| Feminist Initiative | FI | 10 | 1 | 17 | 18 | 29 | 25 | 0 | 17 | 33 | 6 | 12 | 313 | 481 | 0.26% | 0 | 0 | 0 |
| Swedish Senior Citizen Interest Party | SPI | 0 | 9 | 2 | 0 | 230 | 2 | 0 | 0 | 4 | 0 | 0 | 7 | 254 | 0.14% | 0 | 0 | 0 |
| Rural Democrats | | 2 | 1 | 2 | 3 | 2 | 2 | 4 | 4 | 5 | 25 | 3 | 2 | 55 | 0.03% | 0 | 0 | 0 |
| Socialist Justice Party | RS | 0 | 3 | 0 | 2 | 7 | 2 | 0 | 0 | 0 | 0 | 0 | 27 | 41 | 0.02% | 0 | 0 | 0 |
| National Democrats | ND | 1 | 0 | 0 | 0 | 2 | 1 | 1 | 0 | 6 | 0 | 4 | 9 | 24 | 0.01% | 0 | 0 | 0 |
| Unity | ENH | 2 | 0 | 0 | 2 | 1 | 1 | 0 | 0 | 0 | 1 | 0 | 10 | 17 | 0.01% | 0 | 0 | 0 |
| Freedom Party | | 2 | 3 | 0 | 1 | 3 | 3 | 0 | 0 | 0 | 0 | 2 | 1 | 15 | 0.01% | 0 | 0 | 0 |
| Party of the Swedes | SVP | 0 | 0 | 2 | 0 | 1 | 3 | 0 | 0 | 1 | 1 | 1 | 4 | 13 | 0.01% | 0 | 0 | 0 |
| Classical Liberal Party | KLP | 0 | 0 | 0 | 0 | 2 | 0 | 0 | 0 | 0 | 0 | 0 | 10 | 12 | 0.01% | 0 | 0 | 0 |
| Health Care Party | Sjvåp | 0 | 0 | 0 | 0 | 0 | 0 | 0 | 0 | 0 | 3 | 0 | 1 | 4 | 0.00% | 0 | 0 | 0 |
| Communist Party of Sweden | SKP | 0 | 2 | 0 | 0 | 0 | 0 | 0 | 0 | 0 | 0 | 0 | 1 | 3 | 0.00% | 0 | 0 | 0 |
| European Workers Party | EAP | 0 | 0 | 0 | 0 | 1 | 0 | 1 | 0 | 1 | 0 | 0 | 0 | 3 | 0.00% | 0 | 0 | 0 |
| Labour Market Party | | 0 | 0 | 0 | 0 | 0 | 0 | 0 | 0 | 0 | 0 | 2 | 0 | 2 | 0.00% | 0 | 0 | 0 |
| Norrland Coalition Party | NorrS | 0 | 0 | 0 | 0 | 0 | 0 | 0 | 0 | 0 | 0 | 0 | 2 | 2 | 0.00% | 0 | 0 | 0 |
| Active Democracy | | 0 | 0 | 0 | 0 | 1 | 0 | 0 | 0 | 0 | 0 | 0 | 0 | 1 | 0.00% | 0 | 0 | 0 |
| Alliance Party / Citizen's Voice | ALP | 0 | 0 | 0 | 0 | 0 | 0 | 0 | 0 | 0 | 0 | 0 | 1 | 1 | 0.00% | 0 | 0 | 0 |
| Nordic Union | | 0 | 0 | 0 | 0 | 0 | 0 | 0 | 0 | 0 | 0 | 0 | 1 | 1 | 0.00% | 0 | 0 | 0 |
| Spirits Party | | 0 | 0 | 0 | 0 | 0 | 0 | 0 | 0 | 0 | 0 | 1 | 0 | 1 | 0.00% | 0 | 0 | 0 |
| Parties not on the ballot | | 5 | 2 | 0 | 4 | 4 | 0 | 0 | 1 | 4 | 2 | 1 | 17 | 40 | 0.02% | 0 | 0 | 0 |
| Valid votes | | 7,628 | 6,494 | 4,556 | 9,955 | 19,567 | 13,022 | 3,847 | 4,761 | 14,845 | 3,170 | 6,745 | 87,788 | 182,378 | 100.00% | 9 | 3 | 12 |
| Blank votes | | 119 | 68 | 62 | 154 | 186 | 164 | 50 | 58 | 159 | 48 | 100 | 985 | 2,153 | 1.17% | | | |
| Rejected votes – other | | 3 | 1 | 3 | 1 | 7 | 1 | 0 | 1 | 5 | 1 | 6 | 32 | 61 | 0.03% | | | |
| Total polled | | 7,750 | 6,563 | 4,621 | 10,110 | 19,760 | 13,187 | 3,897 | 4,820 | 15,009 | 3,219 | 6,851 | 88,805 | 184,592 | 85.55% | | | |
| Registered electors | | 9,138 | 7,620 | 5,587 | 11,731 | 23,450 | 15,237 | 4,623 | 5,579 | 17,749 | 3,997 | 8,073 | 102,988 | 215,772 | | | | |
| Turnout | | 84.81% | 86.13% | 82.71% | 86.18% | 84.26% | 86.55% | 84.30% | 86.40% | 84.56% | 80.54% | 84.86% | 86.23% | 85.55% | | | | |

The following candidates were elected:

- Constituency seats (personal mandates) - Johan Pehrson (FP), 1,209 votes.
- Constituency seats (party mandates) - Lennart Axelsson (S), 1,138 votes; Håkan Bergman (S), 663 votes; Jonas Eriksson (MP), 453 votes; Matilda Ernkrans (S), 3,522 votes; Eva-Lena Jansson (S), 1,682 votes; Oskar Öholm (M), 727 votes; Elisabeth Svantesson (M), 1,243 votes; and Sten Tolgfors (M), 3,459 votes.
- Levelling seats (personal mandates) - Lars-Axel Nordell (KD), 1,180 votes.
- Levelling seats (party mandates) - Per Ramhorn (SD), 6 votes; and Mia Sydow Mölleby (V), 499 votes.

Permanent substitutions:

- Sten Tolgfors (M) resigned on 31 January 2013 and was replaced by Lotta Olsson (M) on 1 February 2013.

==== 2000s ====
===== 2006 =====
Results of the 2006 general election held on 17 September 2006:

| Party | | Votes per municipality | | | | | | | | | | | | Total votes | % | Seats | | |
| Party | | Asker- sund | Deger- fors | Hälle- fors | Halls- berg | Karls- koga | Kumla | Laxå | Leke- berg | Lindes- berg | Ljusnars- berg | Nora | Örebro | Total votes | % | Con. | Lev. | Tot. |
|---|---|---|---|---|---|---|---|---|---|---|---|---|---|---|---|---|---|---|
| Swedish Social Democratic Party | S | 3,238 | 3,633 | 2,610 | 4,695 | 9,341 | 5,684 | 2,038 | 1,574 | 6,168 | 1,510 | 2,740 | 30,623 | 73,854 | 43.11% | 5 | 0 | 5 |
| Moderate Party | M | 1,371 | 615 | 570 | 1,407 | 3,747 | 1,987 | 513 | 852 | 2,577 | 453 | 1,180 | 16,950 | 32,222 | 18.81% | 2 | 0 | 2 |
| Centre Party | C | 801 | 341 | 345 | 837 | 793 | 893 | 290 | 776 | 1,750 | 321 | 572 | 5,062 | 12,781 | 7.46% | 1 | 0 | 1 |
| Christian Democrats | KD | 549 | 329 | 134 | 630 | 1,010 | 1,066 | 304 | 451 | 765 | 118 | 393 | 6,541 | 12,290 | 7.17% | 1 | 0 | 1 |
| Liberal People's Party | FP | 384 | 201 | 122 | 473 | 898 | 731 | 162 | 219 | 622 | 97 | 425 | 7,006 | 11,340 | 6.62% | 1 | 0 | 1 |
| Left Party | V | 399 | 703 | 390 | 569 | 1,206 | 565 | 212 | 184 | 751 | 277 | 348 | 4,804 | 10,408 | 6.08% | 0 | 1 | 1 |
| Green Party | MP | 259 | 168 | 124 | 336 | 604 | 350 | 76 | 161 | 504 | 107 | 295 | 4,849 | 7,833 | 4.57% | 0 | 1 | 1 |
| Sweden Democrats | SD | 273 | 183 | 161 | 436 | 567 | 523 | 138 | 212 | 727 | 184 | 260 | 2,858 | 6,522 | 3.81% | 0 | 0 | 0 |
| Pirate Party | PP | 24 | 35 | 31 | 41 | 148 | 74 | 14 | 26 | 85 | 14 | 42 | 525 | 1,059 | 0.62% | 0 | 0 | 0 |
| June List | JL | 15 | 24 | 20 | 78 | 87 | 54 | 24 | 34 | 117 | 9 | 50 | 513 | 1,025 | 0.60% | 0 | 0 | 0 |
| Feminist Initiative | FI | 30 | 23 | 21 | 33 | 52 | 25 | 12 | 15 | 52 | 17 | 32 | 543 | 855 | 0.50% | 0 | 0 | 0 |
| Swedish Senior Citizen Interest Party | SPI | 15 | 29 | 9 | 16 | 444 | 41 | 13 | 11 | 23 | 8 | 11 | 184 | 804 | 0.47% | 0 | 0 | 0 |
| Unity | ENH | 5 | 3 | 0 | 6 | 1 | 8 | 1 | 3 | 12 | 0 | 4 | 68 | 111 | 0.06% | 0 | 0 | 0 |
| People's Will | | 3 | 7 | 0 | 0 | 2 | 2 | 1 | 0 | 1 | 0 | 1 | 24 | 41 | 0.02% | 0 | 0 | 0 |
| New Future | NYF | 1 | 4 | 1 | 7 | 1 | 1 | 0 | 0 | 1 | 1 | 0 | 22 | 39 | 0.02% | 0 | 0 | 0 |
| National Democrats | ND | 1 | 1 | 0 | 1 | 3 | 1 | 0 | 0 | 6 | 1 | 8 | 16 | 38 | 0.02% | 0 | 0 | 0 |
| Socialist Justice Party | RS | 0 | 0 | 0 | 0 | 3 | 0 | 0 | 0 | 0 | 0 | 0 | 17 | 20 | 0.01% | 0 | 0 | 0 |
| National Socialist Front | NSF | 0 | 0 | 1 | 0 | 8 | 1 | 0 | 0 | 0 | 1 | 1 | 7 | 19 | 0.01% | 0 | 0 | 0 |
| Health Care Party | Sjvåp | 0 | 1 | 0 | 2 | 0 | 2 | 0 | 0 | 1 | 1 | 0 | 3 | 10 | 0.01% | 0 | 0 | 0 |
| Classical Liberal Party | KLP | 0 | 0 | 0 | 0 | 1 | 0 | 0 | 0 | 0 | 0 | 0 | 1 | 2 | 0.00% | 0 | 0 | 0 |
| Unique Party | | 1 | 0 | 0 | 0 | 0 | 0 | 0 | 0 | 0 | 0 | 0 | 1 | 2 | 0.00% | 0 | 0 | 0 |
| Women's Power | | 0 | 0 | 0 | 0 | 0 | 2 | 0 | 0 | 0 | 0 | 0 | 0 | 2 | 0.00% | 0 | 0 | 0 |
| Active Democracy | | 0 | 0 | 0 | 0 | 0 | 0 | 0 | 0 | 0 | 0 | 0 | 1 | 1 | 0.00% | 0 | 0 | 0 |
| Communist Party of Sweden | SKP | 0 | 0 | 0 | 0 | 0 | 0 | 0 | 0 | 0 | 0 | 0 | 1 | 1 | 0.00% | 0 | 0 | 0 |
| Democratic Party of the New Swedes | DPNS | 0 | 0 | 0 | 0 | 0 | 0 | 0 | 0 | 1 | 0 | 0 | 0 | 1 | 0.00% | 0 | 0 | 0 |
| European Workers Party | EAP | 0 | 0 | 0 | 0 | 0 | 0 | 1 | 0 | 0 | 0 | 0 | 0 | 1 | 0.00% | 0 | 0 | 0 |
| Parties not on the ballot | | 2 | 2 | 1 | 1 | 1 | 1 | 0 | 1 | 2 | 0 | 0 | 11 | 22 | 0.01% | 0 | 0 | 0 |
| Valid votes | | 7,371 | 6,302 | 4,540 | 9,568 | 18,917 | 12,011 | 3,799 | 4,519 | 14,165 | 3,119 | 6,362 | 80,630 | 171,303 | 100.00% | 10 | 2 | 12 |
| Blank votes | | 132 | 95 | 57 | 197 | 356 | 237 | 67 | 106 | 273 | 37 | 129 | 1,419 | 3,105 | 1.78% | | | |
| Rejected votes – other | | 1 | 0 | 1 | 4 | 4 | 7 | 1 | 0 | 1 | 0 | 0 | 28 | 47 | 0.03% | | | |
| Total polled | | 7,504 | 6,397 | 4,598 | 9,769 | 19,277 | 12,255 | 3,867 | 4,625 | 14,439 | 3,156 | 6,491 | 82,077 | 174,455 | 82.77% | | | |
| Registered electors | | 9,078 | 7,770 | 5,803 | 11,629 | 23,667 | 14,480 | 4,780 | 5,534 | 17,755 | 4,139 | 8,009 | 98,117 | 210,761 | | | | |
| Turnout | | 82.66% | 82.33% | 79.23% | 84.01% | 81.45% | 84.63% | 80.90% | 83.57% | 81.32% | 76.25% | 81.05% | 83.65% | 82.77% | | | | |

The following candidates were elected:

- Constituency seats (personal mandates) - Thomas Bodström (S), 8,415 votes; Sofia Larsen (C), 1,963 votes; and Johan Pehrson (FP), 1,575 votes.
- Constituency seats (party mandates) - Lennart Axelsson (S), 511 votes; Matilda Ernkrans (S), 1,263 votes; Eva-Lena Jansson (S), 1,016 votes; Sven Gunnar Persson (KD), 804 votes; Ameer Sachet (S), 294 votes; Elisabeth Svantesson (M), 714 votes; and Sten Tolgfors (M), 2,391 votes.
- Levelling seats (party mandates) - Mikael Johansson (MP), 293 votes; and Peter Pedersen (V), 661 votes.

Permanent substitutions:

- Sven Gunnar Persson (KD) resigned on 31 December 2008 and was replaced by Lars-Axel Nordell (KD) on 1 January 2009. (Note: Ewa Sundkvist was originally appointed to replace Sven Gunnar Persson but she resigned before taking office.)

===== 2002 =====
Results of the 2002 general election held on 15 September 2002:

| Party | | Votes per municipality | | | | | | | | | | | | Total votes | % | Seats | | |
| Party | | Asker- sund | Deger- fors | Hälle- fors | Halls- berg | Karls- koga | Kumla | Laxå | Leke- berg | Lindes- berg | Ljusnars- berg | Nora | Örebro | Total votes | % | Con. | Lev. | Tot. |
|---|---|---|---|---|---|---|---|---|---|---|---|---|---|---|---|---|---|---|
| Swedish Social Democratic Party | S | 3,269 | 3,947 | 2,805 | 4,895 | 10,228 | 5,615 | 2,001 | 1,589 | 6,650 | 1,644 | 2,840 | 32,052 | 77,535 | 46.54% | 5 | 0 | 5 |
| Liberal People's Party | FP | 630 | 391 | 277 | 831 | 1,805 | 1,081 | 351 | 388 | 1,171 | 190 | 713 | 10,909 | 18,737 | 11.25% | 1 | 0 | 1 |
| Moderate Party | M | 800 | 332 | 309 | 814 | 2,125 | 1,179 | 268 | 487 | 1,417 | 228 | 691 | 9,258 | 17,908 | 10.75% | 1 | 0 | 1 |
| Christian Democrats | KD | 673 | 340 | 193 | 839 | 1,239 | 1,207 | 396 | 513 | 1,063 | 196 | 560 | 7,827 | 15,046 | 9.03% | 1 | 0 | 1 |
| Left Party | V | 615 | 866 | 437 | 804 | 1,665 | 910 | 384 | 283 | 1,079 | 389 | 573 | 6,872 | 14,877 | 8.93% | 1 | 0 | 1 |
| Centre Party | C | 760 | 343 | 277 | 809 | 528 | 838 | 286 | 786 | 1,682 | 341 | 490 | 3,539 | 10,679 | 6.41% | 1 | 0 | 1 |
| Green Party | MP | 231 | 164 | 133 | 328 | 551 | 362 | 94 | 161 | 565 | 108 | 257 | 3,997 | 6,951 | 4.17% | 0 | 1 | 1 |
| Sweden Democrats | SD | 152 | 60 | 33 | 226 | 222 | 255 | 96 | 104 | 223 | 54 | 89 | 1,345 | 2,859 | 1.72% | 0 | 0 | 0 |
| Swedish Senior Citizen Interest Party | SPI | 37 | 29 | 9 | 38 | 319 | 89 | 32 | 26 | 34 | 15 | 36 | 479 | 1,143 | 0.69% | 0 | 0 | 0 |
| New Future | NYF | 8 | 0 | 0 | 5 | 4 | 15 | 2 | 3 | 23 | 2 | 1 | 102 | 165 | 0.10% | 0 | 0 | 0 |
| Socialist Party | SOC.P | 1 | 0 | 1 | 0 | 0 | 0 | 0 | 0 | 0 | 0 | 0 | 71 | 73 | 0.04% | 0 | 0 | 0 |
| Socialist Justice Party | RS | 4 | 5 | 0 | 0 | 9 | 1 | 4 | 0 | 10 | 0 | 1 | 15 | 49 | 0.03% | 0 | 0 | 0 |
| Unity | ENH | 1 | 0 | 0 | 1 | 1 | 1 | 0 | 0 | 1 | 0 | 2 | 3 | 10 | 0.01% | 0 | 0 | 0 |
| The Communists | KOMM | 0 | 0 | 0 | 0 | 1 | 0 | 0 | 0 | 0 | 0 | 1 | 2 | 4 | 0.00% | 0 | 0 | 0 |
| European Workers Party | EAP | 0 | 0 | 0 | 0 | 0 | 0 | 1 | 0 | 1 | 0 | 0 | 0 | 2 | 0.00% | 0 | 0 | 0 |
| Tax Reformists | Sref | 0 | 0 | 0 | 0 | 0 | 0 | 0 | 0 | 0 | 0 | 0 | 2 | 2 | 0.00% | 0 | 0 | 0 |
| Sports Party | IdroP | 0 | 0 | 0 | 0 | 0 | 0 | 0 | 0 | 1 | 0 | 0 | 0 | 1 | 0.00% | 0 | 0 | 0 |
| Other parties | ÖVR | 5 | 14 | 4 | 45 | 41 | 20 | 29 | 7 | 69 | 5 | 19 | 298 | 556 | 0.33% | 0 | 0 | 0 |
| Valid votes | | 7,186 | 6,491 | 4,478 | 9,635 | 18,738 | 11,573 | 3,944 | 4,347 | 13,989 | 3,172 | 6,273 | 76,771 | 166,597 | 100.00% | 10 | 1 | 11 |
| Rejected votes | | 109 | 73 | 79 | 137 | 271 | 143 | 71 | 60 | 194 | 35 | 92 | 1,197 | 2,461 | 1.46% | | | |
| Total polled | | 7,295 | 6,564 | 4,557 | 9,772 | 19,009 | 11,716 | 4,015 | 4,407 | 14,183 | 3,207 | 6,365 | 77,968 | 169,058 | 81.25% | | | |
| Registered electors | | 9,004 | 7,973 | 6,018 | 11,873 | 23,873 | 14,215 | 4,976 | 5,386 | 17,885 | 4,312 | 8,036 | 94,520 | 208,071 | | | | |
| Turnout | | 81.02% | 82.33% | 75.72% | 82.30% | 79.63% | 82.42% | 80.69% | 81.82% | 79.30% | 74.37% | 79.21% | 82.49% | 81.25% | | | | |

The following candidates were elected:

- Constituency seats (personal mandates) - Thomas Bodström (S), 10,386 votes; Sofia Jonsson (C), 2,265 votes; Johan Pehrson (FP), 2,135 votes; and Sten Tolgfors (M), 2,351 votes.
- Constituency seats (party mandates) - Lennart Axelsson (S), 478 votes; Nils-Göran Holmqvist (S), 236 votes; Inger Lundberg (S), 1,248 votes; Peter Pedersen (V), 998 votes; Sven Gunnar Persson (KD), 1,099 votes; and Helena Zakariasen (S), 1,042 votes.
- Levelling seats (party mandates) - Mikael Johansson (MP), 252 votes.

Permanent substitutions:

- Inger Lundberg (S) died on 18 February 2006 and was replaced by Matilda Ernkrans (S) on 21 February 2006.

==== 1990s ====
===== 1998 =====
Results of the 1998 general election held on 20 September 1998:

| Party | | Votes per municipality | | | | | | | | | | | | Total votes | % | Seats | | |
| Party | | Asker- sund | Deger- fors | Hälle- fors | Halls- berg | Karls- koga | Kumla | Laxå | Leke- berg | Lindes- berg | Ljusnars- berg | Nora | Örebro | Total votes | % | Con. | Lev. | Tot. |
|---|---|---|---|---|---|---|---|---|---|---|---|---|---|---|---|---|---|---|
| Swedish Social Democratic Party | S | 3,091 | 3,751 | 2,744 | 4,571 | 9,326 | 5,009 | 1,884 | 1,394 | 5,909 | 1,635 | 2,667 | 27,986 | 69,967 | 42.05% | 5 | 0 | 5 |
| Moderate Party | M | 1,150 | 596 | 537 | 1,322 | 3,421 | 1,827 | 461 | 710 | 2,250 | 366 | 1,028 | 14,140 | 27,808 | 16.71% | 2 | 0 | 2 |
| Left Party | V | 930 | 1,215 | 886 | 1,371 | 2,928 | 1,492 | 608 | 458 | 1,967 | 677 | 894 | 9,234 | 22,660 | 13.62% | 2 | 0 | 2 |
| Christian Democrats | KD | 834 | 512 | 282 | 1,032 | 1,828 | 1,389 | 503 | 680 | 1,650 | 268 | 723 | 9,031 | 18,732 | 11.26% | 1 | 0 | 1 |
| Centre Party | C | 616 | 308 | 170 | 645 | 438 | 680 | 198 | 598 | 1,239 | 220 | 363 | 2,830 | 8,305 | 4.99% | 0 | 1 | 1 |
| Liberal People's Party | FP | 251 | 159 | 164 | 331 | 666 | 480 | 139 | 158 | 451 | 72 | 285 | 4,781 | 7,937 | 4.77% | 0 | 1 | 1 |
| Green Party | MP | 264 | 231 | 198 | 392 | 581 | 384 | 140 | 186 | 650 | 141 | 265 | 3,755 | 7,187 | 4.32% | 0 | 1 | 1 |
| Other parties | | 137 | 75 | 41 | 198 | 578 | 228 | 124 | 80 | 266 | 50 | 107 | 1,891 | 3,775 | 2.27% | 0 | 0 | 0 |
| Valid votes | | 7,273 | 6,847 | 5,022 | 9,862 | 19,766 | 11,489 | 4,057 | 4,264 | 14,382 | 3,429 | 6,332 | 73,648 | 166,371 | 100.00% | 10 | 3 | 13 |
| Rejected votes | | 163 | 119 | 82 | 210 | 406 | 266 | 107 | 95 | 280 | 66 | 140 | 1,567 | 3,501 | 2.06% | | | |
| Total polled | | 7,436 | 6,966 | 5,104 | 10,072 | 20,172 | 11,755 | 4,164 | 4,359 | 14,662 | 3,495 | 6,472 | 75,215 | 169,872 | 81.85% | | | |
| Registered electors | | 9,091 | 8,351 | 6,389 | 12,140 | 24,907 | 14,192 | 5,163 | 5,282 | 18,263 | 4,575 | 7,948 | 91,232 | 207,533 | | | | |
| Turnout | | 81.80% | 83.42% | 79.89% | 82.97% | 80.99% | 82.83% | 80.65% | 82.53% | 80.28% | 76.39% | 81.43% | 82.44% | 81.85% | | | | |

The following candidates were elected:

- Constituency seats (personal mandates) - Sten Tolgfors (M), 3,805 votes.
- Constituency seats (party mandates) - Maud Björnemalm (S), 2,618 votes; Rose-Marie Frebran (KD), 659 votes; Helena Frisk (S), 2,476 votes; Nils-Göran Holmqvist (S), 354 votes; Hans Karlsson (S), 1,686 votes; Ola Karlsson (M), 1,949 votes; Inger Lundberg (S), 2,435 votes; Elise Norberg (V), 1,248 votes; and Peter Pedersen (V), 1,706 votes.
- Levelling seats (personal mandates) - Sofia Jonsson (C), 1,369 votes; and Johan Pehrson (FP), 1,199 votes.
- Levelling seats (party mandates) - Mikael Johansson (MP), 283 votes.

Permanent substitutions:

- Elise Norberg (V) resigned on 5 October 1998 and was replaced by Murad Artin (V) on 6 October 1998.
- Hans Karlsson (S) resigned on 19 September 2000 and was replaced by Lennart Axelsson (S) on 20 September 2000.

===== 1994 =====
Results of the 1994 general election held on 18 September 1994:

| Party | | Votes per municipality | | | | | | | | | | | | Total votes | % | Seats | | |
| Party | | Asker- sund | Deger- fors | Hälle- fors | Halls- berg | Karls- koga | Kumla | Laxå | Leke- berg | Lindes- berg | Ljusnars- berg | Nora | Örebro | Total votes | % | Con. | Lev. | Tot. |
|---|---|---|---|---|---|---|---|---|---|---|---|---|---|---|---|---|---|---|
| Swedish Social Democratic Party | S | 4,168 | 4,853 | 3,717 | 5,983 | 12,315 | 6,169 | 2,648 | 1,774 | 8,060 | 2,309 | 3,404 | 35,415 | 90,815 | 50.84% | 5 | 1 | 6 |
| Moderate Party | M | 1,182 | 672 | 570 | 1,331 | 3,993 | 1,762 | 509 | 758 | 2,407 | 441 | 1,093 | 14,325 | 29,043 | 16.26% | 2 | 0 | 2 |
| Liberal People's Party | FP | 440 | 332 | 229 | 643 | 1,271 | 823 | 267 | 239 | 893 | 169 | 495 | 7,445 | 13,246 | 7.42% | 1 | 0 | 1 |
| Left Party | V | 445 | 752 | 519 | 769 | 1,622 | 882 | 263 | 228 | 1,125 | 505 | 475 | 5,127 | 12,712 | 7.12% | 1 | 0 | 1 |
| Centre Party | C | 878 | 447 | 311 | 926 | 799 | 968 | 357 | 818 | 1,820 | 325 | 528 | 4,069 | 12,246 | 6.86% | 1 | 0 | 1 |
| Christian Democratic Unity | KDS | 430 | 210 | 111 | 553 | 636 | 784 | 274 | 376 | 692 | 92 | 287 | 4,417 | 8,862 | 4.96% | 0 | 1 | 1 |
| Green Party | MP | 310 | 240 | 254 | 422 | 733 | 481 | 189 | 241 | 815 | 175 | 366 | 3,952 | 8,178 | 4.58% | 0 | 1 | 1 |
| New Democracy | NyD | 67 | 74 | 32 | 107 | 352 | 171 | 23 | 61 | 117 | 63 | 74 | 1,046 | 2,187 | 1.22% | 0 | 0 | 0 |
| Other parties | | 37 | 28 | 16 | 86 | 94 | 87 | 35 | 22 | 77 | 23 | 32 | 810 | 1,347 | 0.75% | 0 | 0 | 0 |
| Valid votes | | 7,957 | 7,608 | 5,759 | 10,820 | 21,815 | 12,127 | 4,565 | 4,517 | 16,006 | 4,102 | 6,754 | 76,606 | 178,636 | 100.00% | 10 | 3 | 13 |
| Rejected votes | | 108 | 70 | 72 | 160 | 350 | 172 | 78 | 73 | 234 | 41 | 118 | 1,073 | 2,549 | 1.41% | | | |
| Total polled | | 8,065 | 7,678 | 5,831 | 10,980 | 22,165 | 12,299 | 4,643 | 4,590 | 16,240 | 4,143 | 6,872 | 77,679 | 181,185 | 87.25% | | | |
| Registered electors | | 9,240 | 8,598 | 6,840 | 12,427 | 25,686 | 14,005 | 5,389 | 5,264 | 18,681 | 4,889 | 7,945 | 88,701 | 207,665 | | | | |
| Turnout | | 87.28% | 89.30% | 85.25% | 88.36% | 86.29% | 87.82% | 86.16% | 87.20% | 86.93% | 84.74% | 86.49% | 87.57% | 87.25% | | | | |

The following candidates were elected: Maud Björnemalm (S); Rose-Marie Frebran (KDS); Helena Frisk (S); Nils-Göran Holmqvist (S); Hans Karlsson (S); Ola Karlsson (M); Inger Lundberg (S); Karl-Erik Persson (V); Yvonne Ruwaida (MP); Ola Ström (FP); Håkan Strömberg (S); Anders Svärd (C); and Sten Tolgfors (M).

===== 1991 =====
Results of the 1991 general election held on 15 September 1991:

| Party | | Votes per municipality | | | | | | | | | | | Total votes | % | Seats | | |
| Party | | Asker- sund | Deger- fors | Hälle- fors | Halls- berg | Karls- koga | Kumla | Laxå | Lindes- berg | Ljusnars- berg | Nora | Örebro | Total votes | % | Con. | Lev. | Tot. |
|---|---|---|---|---|---|---|---|---|---|---|---|---|---|---|---|---|---|
| Swedish Social Democratic Party | S | 3,401 | 4,591 | 3,474 | 5,087 | 11,210 | 5,205 | 2,270 | 6,830 | 2,029 | 2,778 | 30,366 | 77,241 | 43.53% | 5 | 0 | 5 |
| Moderate Party | M | 1,149 | 662 | 624 | 1,261 | 3,937 | 1,817 | 480 | 2,160 | 418 | 1,024 | 14,271 | 27,803 | 15.67% | 2 | 0 | 2 |
| Liberal People's Party | FP | 483 | 413 | 294 | 786 | 1,967 | 1,008 | 391 | 1,183 | 232 | 536 | 9,432 | 16,725 | 9.43% | 1 | 0 | 1 |
| Christian Democratic Unity | KDS | 735 | 379 | 250 | 891 | 1,272 | 1,184 | 442 | 1,336 | 209 | 501 | 7,554 | 14,753 | 8.31% | 1 | 0 | 1 |
| Centre Party | C | 1,017 | 494 | 379 | 1,123 | 907 | 1,168 | 434 | 1,943 | 364 | 596 | 5,450 | 13,875 | 7.82% | 1 | 0 | 1 |
| New Democracy | NyD | 513 | 406 | 302 | 757 | 1,525 | 846 | 316 | 1,035 | 347 | 513 | 5,337 | 11,897 | 6.70% | 0 | 1 | 1 |
| Left Party | V | 246 | 571 | 411 | 596 | 1,201 | 600 | 247 | 722 | 354 | 370 | 3,877 | 9,195 | 5.18% | 0 | 1 | 1 |
| Green Party | MP | 177 | 159 | 143 | 222 | 403 | 240 | 104 | 476 | 119 | 227 | 2,646 | 4,916 | 2.77% | 0 | 0 | 0 |
| Other parties | | 48 | 16 | 15 | 73 | 51 | 43 | 31 | 71 | 27 | 40 | 633 | 1,048 | 0.59% | 0 | 0 | 0 |
| Valid votes | | 7,769 | 7,691 | 5,892 | 10,796 | 22,473 | 12,111 | 4,715 | 15,756 | 4,099 | 6,585 | 79,566 | 177,453 | 100.00% | 10 | 2 | 12 |
| Rejected votes | | 122 | 90 | 106 | 165 | 338 | 183 | 105 | 253 | 47 | 95 | 1,056 | 2,560 | 1.42% | | | |
| Total polled | | 7,891 | 7,781 | 5,998 | 10,961 | 22,811 | 12,294 | 4,820 | 16,009 | 4,146 | 6,680 | 80,622 | 180,013 | 86.92% | | | |
| Registered electors | | 9,095 | 8,679 | 7,196 | 12,568 | 26,196 | 13,956 | 5,657 | 18,634 | 4,959 | 7,771 | 92,399 | 207,110 | | | | |
| Turnout | | 86.76% | 89.65% | 83.35% | 87.21% | 87.08% | 88.09% | 85.20% | 85.91% | 83.61% | 85.96% | 87.25% | 86.92% | | | | |

The following candidates were elected: Lars Andersson (NyD); Maud Björnemalm (S); Sture Ericson (S); Rose-Marie Frebran (KDS); Ann-Cathrine Haglund (M); Hans Karlsson (S); Inger Lundberg (S); Gudrun Norberg (FP); Karl-Erik Persson (V); Håkan Strömberg (S); Anders Svärd (C); and Bengt Wittbom (M).

Permanent substitutions:

- Ann-Cathrine Haglund (M) resigned on 4 October 1993 and was replaced by Ola Karlsson (M) on 5 October 1993.

==== 1980s ====
===== 1988 =====
Results of the 1988 general election held on 18 September 1988:

| Party | | Votes per municipality | | | | | | | | | | | Total votes | % | Seats | | |
| Party | | Asker- sund | Deger- fors | Hälle- fors | Halls- berg | Karls- koga | Kumla | Laxå | Lindes- berg | Ljusnars- berg | Nora | Örebro | Total votes | % | Con. | Lev. | Tot. |
|---|---|---|---|---|---|---|---|---|---|---|---|---|---|---|---|---|---|
| Swedish Social Democratic Party | S | 3,809 | 4,944 | 3,868 | 5,707 | 12,743 | 5,814 | 2,765 | 7,466 | 2,302 | 3,119 | 33,775 | 86,312 | 49.04% | 6 | 0 | 6 |
| Moderate Party | M | 932 | 488 | 460 | 1,038 | 3,280 | 1,256 | 399 | 1,748 | 336 | 795 | 11,738 | 22,470 | 12.77% | 1 | 0 | 1 |
| Liberal People's Party | FP | 707 | 532 | 410 | 1,029 | 2,619 | 1,319 | 459 | 1,522 | 319 | 738 | 11,949 | 21,603 | 12.27% | 1 | 1 | 2 |
| Centre Party | C | 1,262 | 636 | 418 | 1,477 | 1,396 | 1,481 | 561 | 2,609 | 406 | 690 | 7,921 | 18,857 | 10.71% | 1 | 0 | 1 |
| Left Party – Communists | VPK | 304 | 684 | 559 | 702 | 1,682 | 702 | 298 | 861 | 396 | 370 | 4,972 | 11,530 | 6.55% | 1 | 0 | 1 |
| Green Party | MP | 269 | 262 | 280 | 427 | 651 | 422 | 200 | 805 | 221 | 375 | 3,914 | 7,826 | 4.45% | 0 | 0 | 0 |
| Christian Democratic Unity | KDS | 364 | 198 | 80 | 361 | 494 | 608 | 237 | 595 | 98 | 224 | 3,036 | 6,295 | 3.58% | 0 | 0 | 0 |
| Other parties | | 4 | 23 | 1 | 37 | 86 | 22 | 3 | 21 | 4 | 16 | 896 | 1,113 | 0.63% | 0 | 0 | 0 |
| Valid votes | | 7,651 | 7,767 | 6,076 | 10,778 | 22,951 | 11,624 | 4,922 | 15,627 | 4,082 | 6,327 | 78,201 | 176,006 | 100.00% | 10 | 1 | 11 |
| Rejected votes | | 96 | 71 | 58 | 125 | 250 | 138 | 71 | 186 | 47 | 97 | 1,006 | 2,145 | 1.20% | | | |
| Total polled | | 7,747 | 7,838 | 6,134 | 10,903 | 23,201 | 11,762 | 4,993 | 15,813 | 4,129 | 6,424 | 79,207 | 178,151 | 86.48% | | | |
| Registered electors | | 8,913 | 8,697 | 7,303 | 12,431 | 26,736 | 13,480 | 5,858 | 18,524 | 4,974 | 7,517 | 91,578 | 206,011 | | | | |
| Turnout | | 86.92% | 90.12% | 83.99% | 87.71% | 86.78% | 87.26% | 85.23% | 85.36% | 83.01% | 85.46% | 86.49% | 86.48% | | | | |

The following candidates were elected: Maud Björnemalm (S); Sture Ericson (S); Lars Ernestam (FP); Helge Hagberg (S); Ann-Cathrine Haglund (M); Gudrun Norberg (FP); Karl-Erik Persson (VPK); Ulla Samuelsson (S); Håkan Strömberg (S); Anders Svärd (C); and Rosa-Lill Wåhlstedt (S).

Permanent substitutions:

- Rosa-Lill Wåhlstedt (S) died on 26 May 1991 and was replaced by Inger Lundberg (S) on 28 May 1991.

===== 1985 =====
Results of the 1985 general election held on 15 September 1985:

| Party | | Votes per municipality | | | | | | | | | | | Total votes | % | Seats | | |
| Party | | Asker- sund | Deger- fors | Hälle- fors | Halls- berg | Karls- koga | Kumla | Laxå | Lindes- berg | Ljusnars- berg | Nora | Örebro | Total votes | % | Con. | Lev. | Tot. |
|---|---|---|---|---|---|---|---|---|---|---|---|---|---|---|---|---|---|
| Swedish Social Democratic Party | S | 4,012 | 5,280 | 4,458 | 6,167 | 13,873 | 6,237 | 2,985 | 8,116 | 2,606 | 3,407 | 35,940 | 93,081 | 50.58% | 6 | 0 | 6 |
| Moderate Party | M | 1,160 | 740 | 644 | 1,382 | 4,106 | 1,557 | 575 | 2,484 | 500 | 1,042 | 14,418 | 28,608 | 15.55% | 2 | 0 | 2 |
| Liberal People's Party | FP | 861 | 656 | 526 | 1,249 | 3,060 | 1,530 | 584 | 1,711 | 391 | 897 | 13,462 | 24,927 | 13.55% | 1 | 1 | 2 |
| Centre Party | C | 1,577 | 831 | 486 | 1,817 | 1,691 | 1,943 | 853 | 3,025 | 561 | 812 | 9,546 | 23,142 | 12.58% | 1 | 0 | 1 |
| Left Party – Communists | VPK | 241 | 611 | 497 | 525 | 1,484 | 583 | 280 | 751 | 393 | 292 | 4,359 | 10,016 | 5.44% | 0 | 1 | 1 |
| Green Party | MP | 75 | 96 | 91 | 147 | 238 | 139 | 71 | 420 | 63 | 138 | 1,439 | 2,917 | 1.59% | 0 | 0 | 0 |
| Other parties | | 10 | 11 | 10 | 21 | 35 | 41 | 10 | 52 | 6 | 6 | 1,126 | 1,328 | 0.72% | 0 | 0 | 0 |
| Valid votes | | 7,936 | 8,225 | 6,712 | 11,308 | 24,487 | 12,030 | 5,358 | 16,559 | 4,520 | 6,594 | 80,290 | 184,019 | 100.00% | 10 | 2 | 12 |
| Rejected votes | | 48 | 56 | 37 | 94 | 203 | 112 | 50 | 143 | 34 | 62 | 736 | 1,575 | 0.85% | | | |
| Total polled | | 7,984 | 8,281 | 6,749 | 11,402 | 24,690 | 12,142 | 5,408 | 16,702 | 4,554 | 6,656 | 81,026 | 185,594 | 90.06% | | | |
| Registered electors | | 8,906 | 8,870 | 7,593 | 12,517 | 27,097 | 13,346 | 6,011 | 18,619 | 5,207 | 7,456 | 90,454 | 206,076 | | | | |
| Turnout | | 89.65% | 93.36% | 88.88% | 91.09% | 91.12% | 90.98% | 89.97% | 89.70% | 87.46% | 89.27% | 89.58% | 90.06% | | | | |

The following candidates were elected: Maud Björnemalm (S); Sture Ericson (S); Lars Ernestam (FP); Helge Hagberg (S); Ann-Cathrine Haglund (M); Britta Hammarbacken (C); Ingemar Konradsson (S); Gudrun Norberg (FP); Karl-Erik Persson (VPK); Gunnar Ström (S); Håkan Strömberg (S); and Bengt Wittbom (M).

===== 1982 =====
Results of the 1982 general election held on 19 September 1982:

| Party | | Votes per municipality | | | | | | | | | | | Total votes | % | Seats | | |
| Party | | Asker- sund | Deger- fors | Hälle- fors | Halls- berg | Karls- koga | Kumla | Laxå | Lindes- berg | Ljusnars- berg | Nora | Örebro | Total votes | % | Con. | Lev. | Tot. |
|---|---|---|---|---|---|---|---|---|---|---|---|---|---|---|---|---|---|
| Swedish Social Democratic Party | S | 4,091 | 5,426 | 4,631 | 6,262 | 14,376 | 6,272 | 3,164 | 8,486 | 2,851 | 3,541 | 37,840 | 96,940 | 52.21% | 6 | 0 | 6 |
| Moderate Party | M | 1,279 | 822 | 654 | 1,557 | 4,713 | 1,852 | 647 | 2,595 | 489 | 1,042 | 16,687 | 32,337 | 17.41% | 2 | 0 | 2 |
| Centre Party | C | 1,689 | 954 | 728 | 2,009 | 2,379 | 1,940 | 947 | 3,465 | 693 | 1,120 | 11,735 | 27,659 | 14.90% | 2 | 0 | 2 |
| Liberal People's Party | FP | 399 | 296 | 226 | 632 | 1,216 | 688 | 211 | 740 | 158 | 398 | 5,481 | 10,445 | 5.63% | 0 | 1 | 1 |
| Left Party – Communists | VPK | 233 | 542 | 581 | 549 | 1,507 | 623 | 271 | 705 | 350 | 295 | 4,402 | 10,058 | 5.42% | 0 | 1 | 1 |
| Christian Democratic Unity | KDS | 269 | 165 | 118 | 403 | 421 | 491 | 234 | 444 | 103 | 146 | 2,324 | 5,118 | 2.76% | 0 | 0 | 0 |
| Green Party | MP | 96 | 85 | 78 | 125 | 311 | 157 | 59 | 291 | 73 | 138 | 1,418 | 2,831 | 1.52% | 0 | 0 | 0 |
| K-Party | K-P | 0 | 1 | 6 | 0 | 17 | 4 | 0 | 0 | 2 | 0 | 20 | 50 | 0.03% | 0 | 0 | 0 |
| Other parties | | 2 | 1 | 1 | 2 | 25 | 11 | 3 | 14 | 4 | 3 | 182 | 248 | 0.13% | 0 | 0 | 0 |
| Valid votes | | 8,058 | 8,292 | 7,023 | 11,539 | 24,965 | 12,038 | 5,536 | 16,740 | 4,723 | 6,683 | 80,089 | 185,686 | 100.00% | 10 | 2 | 12 |
| Rejected votes | | 57 | 56 | 46 | 79 | 217 | 99 | 46 | 134 | 35 | 63 | 777 | 1,609 | 0.86% | | | |
| Total polled | | 8,115 | 8,348 | 7,069 | 11,618 | 25,182 | 12,137 | 5,582 | 16,874 | 4,758 | 6,746 | 80,866 | 187,295 | 91.53% | | | |
| Registered electors | | 8,932 | 8,835 | 7,733 | 12,590 | 27,183 | 13,211 | 6,104 | 18,469 | 5,265 | 7,408 | 88,887 | 204,617 | | | | |
| Turnout | | 90.85% | 94.49% | 91.41% | 92.28% | 92.64% | 91.87% | 91.45% | 91.36% | 90.37% | 91.06% | 90.98% | 91.53% | | | | |

The following candidates were elected: Sture Ericson (S); Lars Ernestam (FP); Karin Flodström (S); Helge Hagberg (S); Ann-Cathrine Haglund (M); Britta Hammarbacken (C); Per Israelsson (VPK); Ingemar Konradsson (S); Gunnar Ström (S); Håkan Strömberg (S); Anders Svärd (C); and Bengt Wittbom (M).

==== 1970s ====
===== 1979 =====
Results of the 1979 general election held on 16 September 1979:

| Party | | Votes per municipality | | | | | | | | | | | Total votes | % | Seats | | |
| Party | | Asker- sund | Deger- fors | Hälle- fors | Halls- berg | Karls- koga | Kumla | Laxå | Lindes- berg | Ljusnars- berg | Nora | Örebro | Total votes | % | Con. | Lev. | Tot. |
|---|---|---|---|---|---|---|---|---|---|---|---|---|---|---|---|---|---|
| Swedish Social Democratic Party | S | 3,686 | 5,148 | 4,599 | 5,808 | 13,382 | 5,751 | 2,923 | 7,750 | 2,753 | 3,215 | 34,974 | 89,989 | 49.16% | 6 | 0 | 6 |
| Centre Party | C | 1,884 | 1,175 | 819 | 2,477 | 3,066 | 2,218 | 1,080 | 4,090 | 872 | 1,334 | 13,703 | 32,718 | 17.87% | 2 | 0 | 2 |
| Moderate Party | M | 1,133 | 665 | 516 | 1,201 | 3,801 | 1,585 | 557 | 2,210 | 429 | 825 | 14,377 | 27,299 | 14.91% | 2 | 0 | 2 |
| Liberal People's Party | FP | 599 | 543 | 423 | 1,069 | 2,436 | 1,210 | 483 | 1,221 | 232 | 642 | 9,430 | 18,288 | 9.99% | 1 | 0 | 1 |
| Left Party – Communists | VPK | 228 | 463 | 547 | 508 | 1,585 | 570 | 260 | 692 | 364 | 296 | 4,132 | 9,645 | 5.27% | 0 | 1 | 1 |
| Christian Democratic Unity | KDS | 228 | 163 | 88 | 270 | 261 | 357 | 170 | 344 | 80 | 134 | 1,546 | 3,641 | 1.99% | 0 | 0 | 0 |
| Communist Party of Sweden | SKP | 8 | 22 | 12 | 5 | 136 | 5 | 36 | 44 | 3 | 15 | 384 | 670 | 0.37% | 0 | 0 | 0 |
| Workers' Party – The Communists | APK | 0 | 6 | 18 | 0 | 2 | 2 | 0 | 0 | 0 | 0 | 71 | 99 | 0.05% | 0 | 0 | 0 |
| Other parties | | 54 | 9 | 13 | 46 | 34 | 47 | 46 | 26 | 3 | 54 | 378 | 710 | 0.39% | 0 | 0 | 0 |
| Valid votes | | 7,820 | 8,194 | 7,035 | 11,384 | 24,703 | 11,745 | 5,555 | 16,377 | 4,736 | 6,515 | 78,995 | 183,059 | 100.00% | 11 | 1 | 12 |
| Rejected votes | | 38 | 35 | 21 | 38 | 107 | 48 | 29 | 88 | 28 | 40 | 510 | 982 | 0.53% | | | |
| Total polled | | 7,858 | 8,229 | 7,056 | 11,422 | 24,810 | 11,793 | 5,584 | 16,465 | 4,764 | 6,555 | 79,505 | 184,041 | 90.66% | | | |
| Registered electors | | 8,716 | 8,741 | 7,758 | 12,454 | 27,158 | 12,939 | 6,109 | 18,205 | 5,337 | 7,262 | 88,316 | 202,995 | | | | |
| Turnout | | 90.16% | 94.14% | 90.95% | 91.71% | 91.35% | 91.14% | 91.41% | 90.44% | 89.26% | 90.26% | 90.02% | 90.66% | | | | |

The following candidates were elected: Kerstin Andersson (S); Sven G. Andersson (FP); Sture Ericson (S); Karin Flodström (S); Helge Hagberg (S); Ann-Cathrine Haglund (M); Britta Hammarbacken (C); Per Israelsson (VPK); Ingemar Konradsson (S); Erik Larsson (C); Håkan Strömberg (S); and Bengt Wittbom (M).

===== 1976 =====
Results of the 1976 general election held on 19 September 1976:

| Party | | Votes per municipality | | | | | | | | | | | Total votes | % | Seats | | |
| Party | | Asker- sund | Deger- fors | Hälle- fors | Halls- berg | Karls- koga | Kumla | Laxå | Lindes- berg | Ljusnars- berg | Nora | Örebro | Total votes | % | Con. | Lev. | Tot. |
|---|---|---|---|---|---|---|---|---|---|---|---|---|---|---|---|---|---|
| Swedish Social Democratic Party | S | 3,618 | 4,976 | 4,669 | 5,617 | 13,503 | 5,463 | 2,884 | 7,522 | 2,781 | 3,077 | 35,884 | 89,994 | 48.72% | 6 | 0 | 6 |
| Centre Party | C | 2,426 | 1,551 | 1,133 | 3,186 | 4,568 | 2,987 | 1,434 | 5,188 | 1,098 | 1,620 | 19,182 | 44,373 | 24.02% | 3 | 0 | 3 |
| Moderate Party | M | 784 | 473 | 362 | 886 | 2,773 | 1,023 | 383 | 1,674 | 325 | 584 | 10,614 | 19,881 | 10.76% | 1 | 0 | 1 |
| People's Party | F | 571 | 470 | 390 | 1,029 | 2,508 | 1,230 | 458 | 1,190 | 187 | 610 | 9,895 | 18,538 | 10.04% | 1 | 0 | 1 |
| Left Party – Communists | VPK | 170 | 380 | 554 | 387 | 1,310 | 534 | 222 | 509 | 300 | 242 | 3,296 | 7,904 | 4.28% | 0 | 0 | 0 |
| Christian Democratic Unity | KDS | 211 | 167 | 108 | 211 | 250 | 302 | 180 | 298 | 78 | 137 | 1,274 | 3,216 | 1.74% | 0 | 0 | 0 |
| Communist Party of Sweden | SKP | 6 | 17 | 19 | 12 | 132 | 13 | 30 | 38 | 7 | 3 | 471 | 748 | 0.40% | 0 | 0 | 0 |
| Other parties | | 1 | 0 | 0 | 1 | 5 | 1 | 0 | 1 | 0 | 4 | 54 | 67 | 0.04% | 0 | 0 | 0 |
| Valid votes | | 7,787 | 8,034 | 7,235 | 11,329 | 25,049 | 11,553 | 5,591 | 16,420 | 4,776 | 6,277 | 80,670 | 184,721 | 100.00% | 11 | 0 | 11 |
| Rejected votes | | 30 | 25 | 15 | 38 | 66 | 34 | 21 | 29 | 12 | 19 | 341 | 630 | 0.34% | | | |
| Total polled | | 7,817 | 8,059 | 7,250 | 11,367 | 25,115 | 11,587 | 5,612 | 16,449 | 4,788 | 6,296 | 81,011 | 185,351 | 91.95% | | | |
| Registered electors | | 8,574 | 8,480 | 7,860 | 12,260 | 27,113 | 12,571 | 6,069 | 17,877 | 5,343 | 6,878 | 88,554 | 201,579 | | | | |
| Turnout | | 91.17% | 95.04% | 92.24% | 92.72% | 92.63% | 92.17% | 92.47% | 92.01% | 89.61% | 91.54% | 91.48% | 91.95% | | | | |

The following candidates were elected: Henry Allard (S); Kerstin Andersson (S); Sven G. Andersson (F); Sture Ericson (S); Britta Hammarbacken (C); Ingemar Konradsson (S); Helge Hagberg (S); Erik Larsson (C); Georg Pettersson (C); Per-Eric Ringaby (M); and Håkan Strömberg (S).

===== 1973 =====
Results of the 1973 general election held on 16 September 1973:

| Party | | Votes per municipality | | | | | | | | | | | Total votes | % | Seats | | |
| Party | | Asker- sund | Deger- fors | Hälle- fors | Halls- berg | Karls- koga | Kumla | Laxå | Lindes- berg | Ljusnars- berg | Nora | Örebro | Total votes | % | Con. | Lev. | Tot. |
|---|---|---|---|---|---|---|---|---|---|---|---|---|---|---|---|---|---|
| Swedish Social Democratic Party | S | 3,552 | 4,756 | 4,547 | 5,512 | 13,528 | 5,199 | 2,897 | 7,233 | 2,759 | 2,912 | 35,337 | 88,232 | 49.76% | 6 | 0 | 6 |
| Centre Party | C | 2,225 | 1,410 | 1,091 | 2,839 | 4,737 | 2,656 | 1,346 | 4,933 | 983 | 1,400 | 18,828 | 42,448 | 23.94% | 3 | 0 | 3 |
| Moderate Party | M | 635 | 393 | 347 | 765 | 2,308 | 863 | 340 | 1,357 | 229 | 514 | 9,224 | 16,975 | 9.57% | 1 | 0 | 1 |
| People's Party | F | 551 | 398 | 345 | 944 | 1,720 | 1,047 | 356 | 1,187 | 219 | 537 | 8,972 | 16,276 | 9.18% | 1 | 0 | 1 |
| Left Party – Communists | VPK | 176 | 367 | 628 | 382 | 1,708 | 595 | 318 | 615 | 357 | 290 | 3,059 | 8,495 | 4.79% | 0 | 1 | 1 |
| Christian Democratic Unity | KDS | 297 | 176 | 86 | 271 | 316 | 387 | 170 | 380 | 92 | 166 | 1,669 | 4,010 | 2.26% | 0 | 0 | 0 |
| Communist Party of Sweden | SKP | 16 | 24 | 16 | 23 | 94 | 30 | 8 | 45 | 6 | 11 | 424 | 697 | 0.39% | 0 | 0 | 0 |
| Communist League Marxist–Leninists (the revolutionaries) | KFML(r) | 0 | 8 | 2 | 14 | 37 | 6 | 1 | 8 | 4 | 3 | 84 | 167 | 0.09% | 0 | 0 | 0 |
| Other parties | | 0 | 1 | 0 | 1 | 1 | 0 | 0 | 0 | 0 | 0 | 7 | 10 | 0.01% | 0 | 0 | 0 |
| Valid votes | | 7,452 | 7,533 | 7,062 | 10,751 | 24,449 | 10,783 | 5,436 | 15,758 | 4,649 | 5,833 | 77,604 | 177,310 | 100.00% | 11 | 1 | 12 |
| Rejected votes | | 13 | 8 | 11 | 19 | 31 | 13 | 12 | 19 | 4 | 9 | 155 | 294 | 0.17% | | | |
| Total polled | | 7,465 | 7,541 | 7,073 | 10,770 | 24,480 | 10,796 | 5,448 | 15,777 | 4,653 | 5,842 | 77,759 | 177,604 | 90.89% | | | |
| Registered electors | | 8,279 | 7,962 | 7,765 | 11,769 | 26,701 | 11,841 | 5,948 | 17,354 | 5,254 | 6,498 | 86,025 | 195,396 | | | | |
| Turnout | | 90.17% | 94.71% | 91.09% | 91.51% | 91.68% | 91.17% | 91.59% | 90.91% | 88.56% | 89.90% | 90.39% | 90.89% | | | | |

The following candidates were elected: Henry Allard (S); Kerstin Andersson (S); Sven G. Andersson (F); Sture Ericson (S); Helge Hagberg (S); Per Israelsson (VPK); Sigvard Karlehagen (C); Ingemar Konradsson (S); Åke Larsson (S); Erik Larsson (C); Georg Pettersson (C); and Per-Eric Ringaby (M).

===== 1970 =====
Results of the 1970 general election held on 20 September 1970:

| Party | | Votes per municipality | | | | | | | | | | | | | Total votes | % | Seats | | |
| Party | | Asker- sund | Deger- fors | Glans- hammar | Hälle- fors | Halls- berg | Karls- koga | Kumla | Laxå | Lindes- berg | Ljusnars- berg | Nora | Örebro | Postal votes | Total votes | % | Con. | Lev. | Tot. |
|---|---|---|---|---|---|---|---|---|---|---|---|---|---|---|---|---|---|---|---|
| Swedish Social Democratic Party | S | 3,071 | 4,466 | 588 | 4,205 | 4,908 | 12,356 | 4,710 | 2,613 | 6,723 | 2,591 | 2,547 | 29,718 | 10,563 | 89,059 | 51.17% | 6 | 0 | 6 |
| Centre Party | C | 1,869 | 1,082 | 972 | 748 | 2,229 | 3,167 | 2,003 | 948 | 3,826 | 707 | 1,046 | 12,459 | 3,896 | 34,952 | 20.08% | 2 | 0 | 2 |
| People's Party | F | 525 | 469 | 306 | 481 | 1,078 | 2,398 | 1,293 | 538 | 1,396 | 307 | 548 | 10,361 | 5,190 | 24,890 | 14.30% | 2 | 0 | 2 |
| Moderate Party | M | 378 | 253 | 236 | 205 | 512 | 1,195 | 550 | 217 | 844 | 109 | 315 | 4,730 | 3,599 | 13,143 | 7.55% | 1 | 0 | 1 |
| Left Party – Communists | VPK | 143 | 316 | 17 | 556 | 347 | 1,664 | 479 | 282 | 437 | 323 | 262 | 1,838 | 808 | 7,472 | 4.29% | 0 | 1 | 1 |
| Christian Democratic Unity | KDS | 230 | 115 | 14 | 64 | 189 | 228 | 324 | 164 | 305 | 89 | 140 | 1,173 | 717 | 3,752 | 2.16% | 0 | 0 | 0 |
| Communist League Marxists-Leninists | KFML | 9 | 22 | 0 | 0 | 22 | 60 | 40 | 9 | 21 | 5 | 7 | 408 | 142 | 745 | 0.43% | 0 | 0 | 0 |
| Other parties | | 0 | 0 | 0 | 0 | 0 | 0 | 0 | 0 | 0 | 0 | 0 | 1 | 17 | 18 | 0.01% | 0 | 0 | 0 |
| Valid votes | | 6,225 | 6,723 | 2,133 | 6,259 | 9,285 | 21,068 | 9,399 | 4,771 | 13,552 | 4,131 | 4,865 | 60,688 | 24,932 | 174,031 | 100.00% | 11 | 1 | 12 |
| Rejected votes | | 5 | 14 | 0 | 4 | 13 | 16 | 13 | 7 | 14 | 3 | 6 | 83 | 70 | 248 | 0.14% | | | |
| Total polled exc. postal votes | | 6,230 | 6,737 | 2,133 | 6,263 | 9,298 | 21,084 | 9,412 | 4,778 | 13,566 | 4,134 | 4,871 | 60,771 | 25,002 | 174,279 | | | | |
| Postal votes | | 1,106 | 810 | 156 | 874 | 1,355 | 3,038 | 897 | 606 | 2,170 | 625 | 820 | 12,519 | -25,002 | -26 | | | | |
| Total polled inc. postal votes | | 7,336 | 7,547 | 2,289 | 7,137 | 10,653 | 24,122 | 10,309 | 5,384 | 15,736 | 4,759 | 5,691 | 73,290 | 0 | 174,253 | 88.44% | | | |
| Registered electors | | 8,449 | 8,093 | 2,611 | 7,958 | 11,918 | 26,943 | 11,684 | 6,174 | 17,606 | 5,443 | 6,548 | 83,595 | | 197,022 | | | | |
| Turnout | | 86.83% | 93.25% | 87.67% | 89.68% | 89.39% | 89.53% | 88.23% | 87.20% | 89.38% | 87.43% | 86.91% | 87.67% | | 88.44% | | | | |

The following candidates were elected: Henry Allard (S); Sven G. Andersson (F); Erik Brandt (S); Sture Ericson (S); Per Israelsson (VPK); Åke Larsson (S); Erik Larsson (C); Marta Lindberg (S); Sven Moberg (S); Georg Pettersson (C); Per-Eric Ringaby (M); and Bert Stålhammar (F).
