= Vilhelmsson =

Vilhelmsson is a surname. Notable people with the surname include:

- Helena Vilhelmsson (born 1965), Swedish politician
- Oscar Vilhelmsson (born 2003), Swedish footballer
