= Sara-Lena Bjälkö =

Swedish politician (born 1976)

Member of the Riksdag
- Incumbent
- Assumed office 2014
- Constituency: Örebro County

Personal details
- Born: 23 February 1976 (age 50) Laholm, Sweden
- Party: Christian Democrats (since 2025)
- Other political affiliations: Sweden Democrats (until 2025)

Sara-Lena Caroline Bjälkö (born 23 February 1976) is a Swedish politician and a member of the Christian Democrats party who has served in the Riksdag since 2014.

Bjälkö worked as a nurse before her political career. She was elected to the Riksdag in 2014 for the Sweden Democrats representing the constituency of Örebro County. She also served as the chairwoman of the SD's local chapter in Falkenberg.

In 2018, Bjälkö was involved in an incident in which a bus she was traveling on was shot at with blanks by a passing car. The perpetrator said he wasn't targeting Bjälkö. He was found guilty of illegal threats and "firearm offense" (Swedish: vapenbrott), and ordered to do community service and pay a fine of SEK 21,000 to the victims.

On 23 December 2025 Bjälkö announced that she would leave the Sweden Democrats and join the Christian Democrats.
