= Per Söderlund =

Swedish politician (born 1972)

Member of the Riksdag
- Incumbent
- Assumed office 1 February 2019
- Constituency: Örebro County

Personal details
- Born: 1972 (age 53–54)
- Party: Sweden Democrats

Per Söderlund (born 1972) is a Swedish politician. As of February 2019, he serves as Member of the Riksdag representing the constituency of Örebro County. Söderlund worked as a software developer before becoming an MP. He became a member after Jonas Millard left the Riksdag.

He was also elected as Member of the Riksdag in September 2022.
