= Camilla Hansén =

Swedish politician (born 1976)

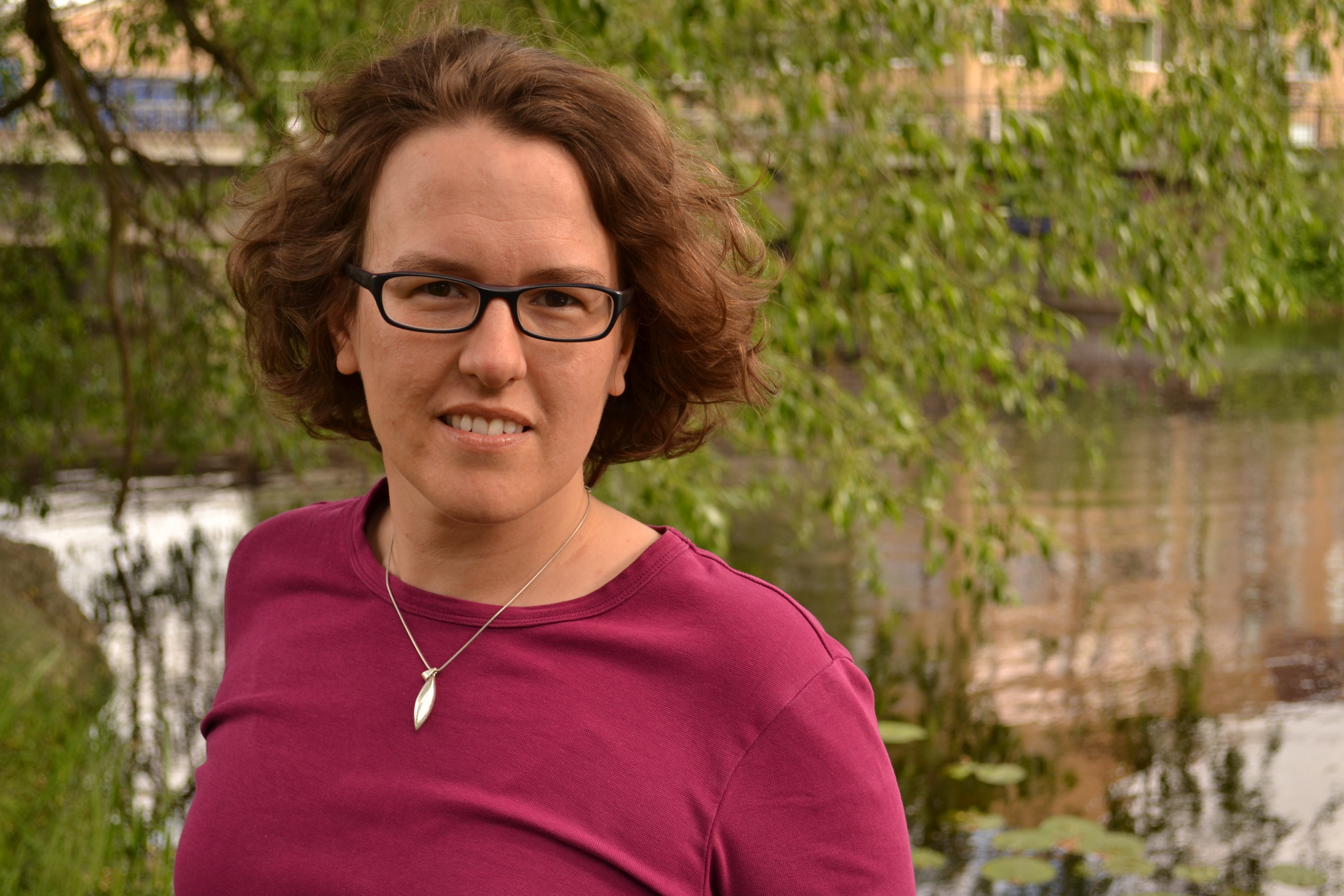
- Hansén in 2013

Member of the Riksdag
- Incumbent
- Assumed office 4 November 2019
- Constituency: Örebro County

Personal details
- Born: 29 April 1976 (age 50) Sköllersta, Sweden
- Party: Green Party

Eva Camilla Hansén (née Tenne; born 29 April 1976) is a Swedish politician. Since November 2019, she serves as Member of the Riksdag representing the constituency of Örebro County. She became a member after Jonas Eriksson resigned. She is affiliated with the Green Party.

On 30 April 2021, Hansén undertook godparenthood for Ales Pushkin, painter and political prisoner from Belarus.

She was also elected as Member of the Riksdag in September 2022.
