= Håkan Bergman =

Swedish politician (born 1954)

Member of the Riksdag
- In office 4 October 2010 – 24 September 2018
- Constituency: Örebro County

Personal details
- Born: 1954 (age 71–72)
- Party: Social Democratic Party

Carl-Håkan Bergman (born 1954) is a Swedish politician and former member of the Riksdag, the national legislature. A member of the Social Democratic Party, he represented Örebro County between October 2010 and September 2018.
