= Lotta Olsson =

Swedish politician (born 1960)

Member of the Riksdag
- In office 1 February 2013 – 26 September 2022
- Constituency: Örebro County

Personal details
- Born: 1960 (age 65–66)
- Party: Moderate Party

Lotta (Anna Charlotta) Olsson (born 1960) is a Swedish politician. She served as Member of the Riksdag representing the constituency of Örebro County, from 2013 to 2022. In may 2026 she published her first book, "Guillain Barrè, Me and the President (published in Swedish).
