= Oskar Svärd (politician) =

Swedish politician (born 1995)

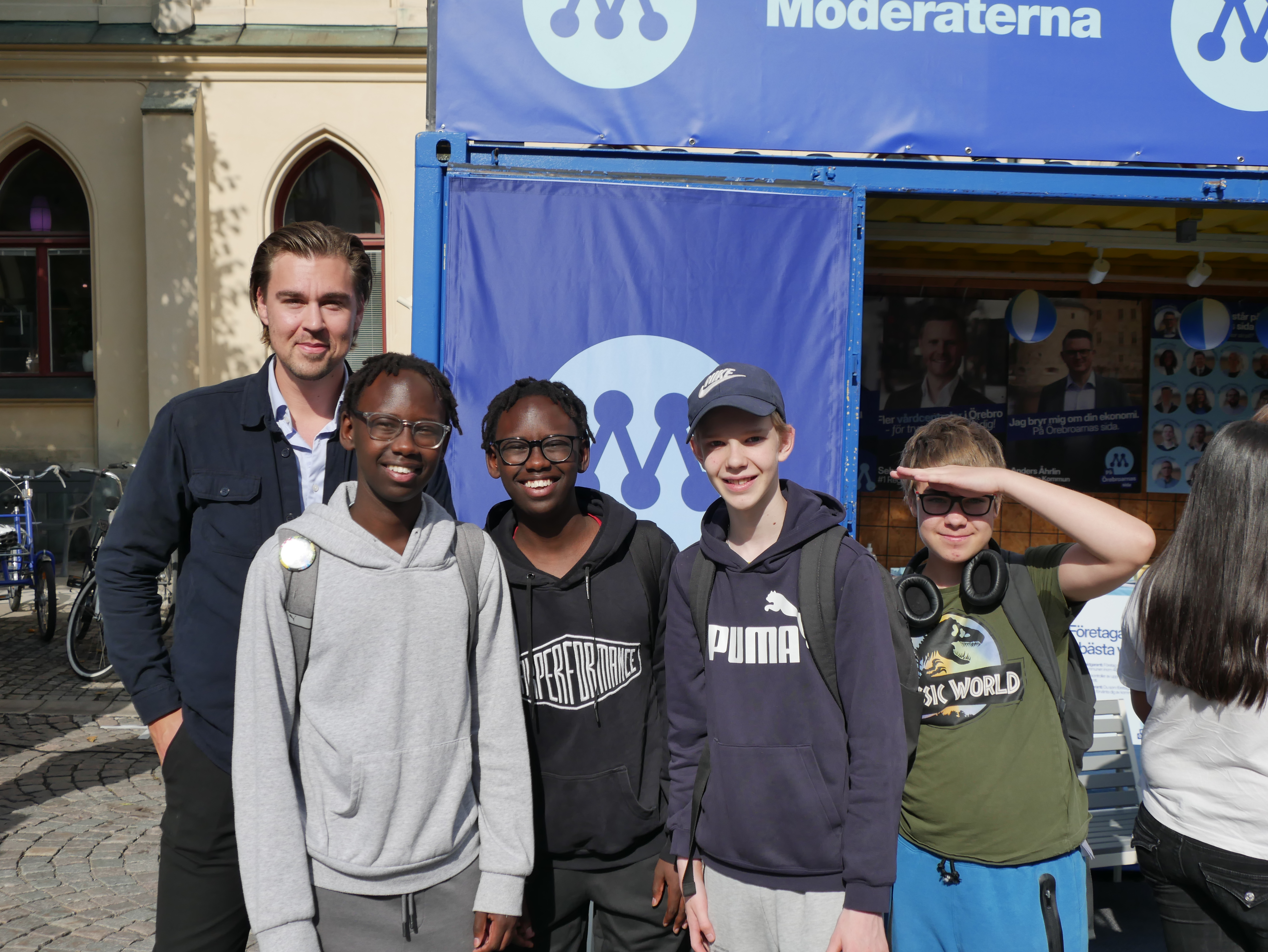
- Svärd (far-left) with schoolboys (2026)

Member of the Riksdag
- Incumbent
- Assumed office 26 September 2022
- Constituency: Örebro County

Personal details
- Born: 25 December 1995 (age 30)
- Party: Moderate Party
- Relatives: Anders Svärd (grandfather)

Oskar Svärd (born 25 December 1995) is a Swedish politician serving as a member of the Riksdag since 2022. He has served as chairman of the Moderate Party in Örebro County since 2021. He is the grandson of Anders Svärd.
