= Nadja Awad =

Swedish politician (born 1991)

Member of the Riksdag
- Incumbent
- Assumed office 26 September 2022
- Constituency: Örebro County

Personal details
- Born: 1991 (age 34–35)
- Party: Left Party

Nadja Awad (born 1991) is a Swedish politician. She was elected as Member of the Riksdag in September 2022. She represents the constituency of Örebro County. She is affiliated with the Left Party.
