= Hans Eklind =

Swedish politician (born 1966)

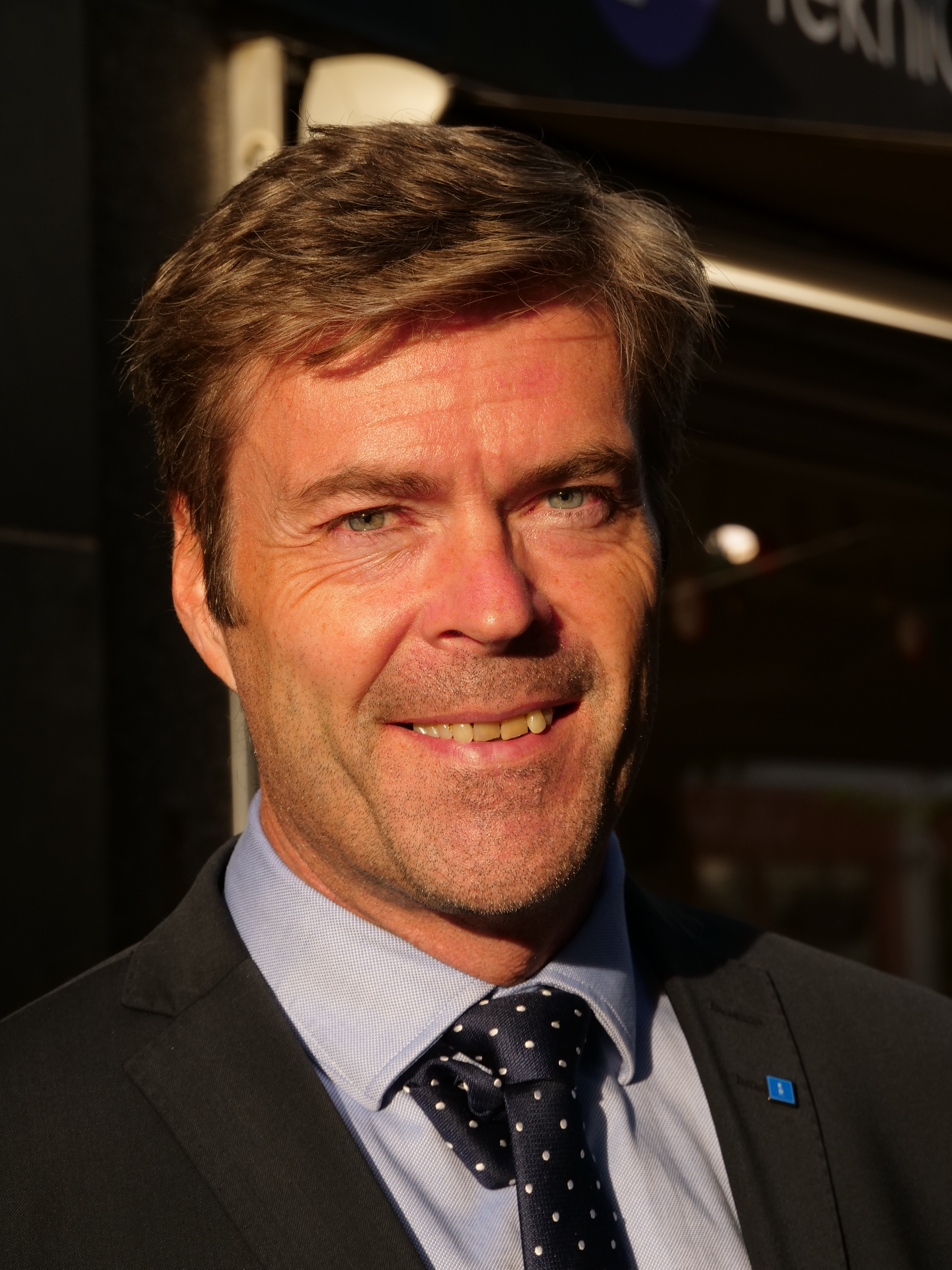

Member of the Riksdag
- Incumbent
- Assumed office 24 September 2018
- Constituency: Örebro County

Personal details
- Born: 1966 (age 59–60)
- Party: Christian Democrats

Hans Eklind (born 1966) is a Swedish politician. Since September 2018, he has served as a Member of the Riksdag from the Christian Democrats representing the constituency of Örebro County.

He was also elected as Member of the Riksdag in September 2022.
