= Denis Begic =

Swedish politician (born 1970)

Member of the Riksdag
- Incumbent
- Assumed office 24 September 2018
- Constituency: Örebro County

Personal details
- Born: 1970 (age 55–56)
- Party: Social Democrats

Denis Begic (born 1970) is a Swedish politician. As of 24 September 2018, he serves as Member of the Riksdag representing the constituency of Örebro County.

He was also elected as Member of the Riksdag in September 2022.
