= Mia Sydow Mölleby =

Swedish politician (born 1960)

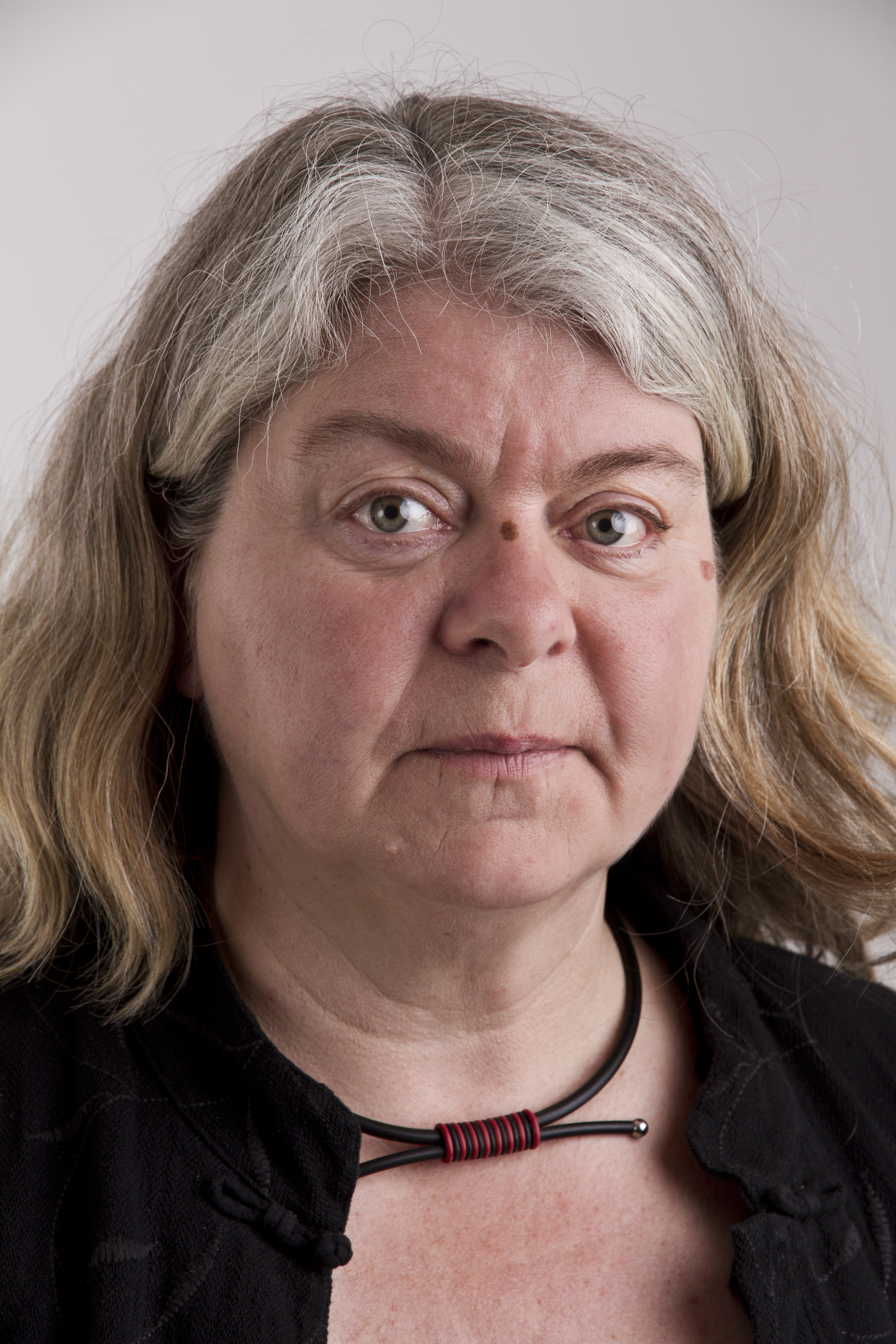

Member of the Riksdag
- In office 4 October 2010 – 26 September 2022
- Constituency: Örebro County

Personal details
- Born: 27 October 1960 (age 65)
- Party: Left Party

Mia Sydow Mölleby (born 27 October 1960) is a Swedish politician. She served as Member of the Riksdag representing the constituency of Örebro County.
