= Willhelm Sundman =

Swedish politician (born 1992)

Member of the Riksdag
- Incumbent
- Assumed office 28 September 2026
- Constituency: Örebro County

Personal details
- Born: 11 June 1992 (age 34)
- Party: Liberals

Willhelm Thomas Sundman (born 11 June 1992) is a Swedish politician who was elected member of the Riksdag in 2026. From 2024 to 2026, he served as chairman of the Liberals in Örebro County. From 2020 to 2026, he was a regional councillor of Region Örebro County.
