= Inger Lundberg =

Swedish politician (1948–2006)

Member of the Riksdag
- In office 28 May 1991 – 18 February 2006
- Preceded by: Rosa-Lill Wåhlstedt
- Succeeded by: Matilda Ernkrans
- Constituency: Örebro County

Personal details
- Born: 1948 Nacka, Sweden
- Died: 18 February 2006 (aged 57) Örebro University Hospital, Örebro, Sweden
- Party: Social Democratic Party
- Education: Örebro University

Inger Lundberg (1948 – 18 February 2006) was a Swedish politician and member of the Riksdag, the national legislature. A member of the Social Democratic Party, she represented Örebro County between May 1991 and February 2006.

Lundberg was born in Nacka. She has a degree in sociology from Örebro University (1972). She died on 18 February 2006 aged 57 at Örebro University Hospital.
