= Nils-Göran Holmqvist =

Swedish politician (born 1943)

Member of the Riksdag
- In office 3 October 1994 – 2 October 2006
- Constituency: Dalarna County

Personal details
- Born: 1943 (age 82–83)
- Party: Social Democratic Party

Nils-Göran Holmqvist (born 1943) is a Swedish politician and former member of the Riksdag, the national legislature. A member of the Social Democratic Party, he represented Dalarna County between October 1994 and October 2006.
