= Karin Sundin =

Swedish politician (born 1972)

Member of the Riksdag
- Incumbent
- Assumed office 26 September 2022
- Constituency: Örebro County

Personal details
- Born: 1972 (age 53–54)
- Party: Social Democrats

Karin Sundin (born 1972) is a Swedish politician. She was elected as Member of the Riksdag in September 2022. She represents the constituency of Örebro County. She is affiliated with the Social Democrats.
