= Jonas Millard =

Swedish politician (born 1981)

Member of the Riksdag
- In office 2014–2019
- Constituency: Västra Götaland County

Personal details
- Born: 1981 (age 44–45)
- Party: Sweden Democrats (until 2019)

Jonas Millard (born September, 1981) is a Swedish former politician and MP in the Riksdag who represented the Sweden Democrats party.

Millard was born in Karlstad, Värmland, but raised in Örebro. He studied information technology and worked in IT security.

He joined the Sweden Democrats late in the 1990s and in 2011 was elected as a municipal councilor in Örebro Municipality. He was elected to the Riksdag in 2014.

In December 2018, Dagens Nyheter reported that Millard had made a number of misogynistic posts on the website Flasback in which he joked about rape, appeared to encourage violence against women and advised from personal experience on vacations to Bangkok on how to buy prostitutes in Thailand. It was also found that Millard had used the same computer servers and password from his job at Örebro Municipality council when making the posts. Millard denied some of the accusations and claimed that other people had made some of the posts, but admitted to using prostitutes abroad. In response, the Sweden Democrats announced an investigation into the incident and that Millard would leave the Riksdag following the controversy. He was subsequently removed from the party in 2019. Per Söderlund replaced him in the Riksdag.
