= Mikael Johansson (politician) =

Swedish politician (born 1960)

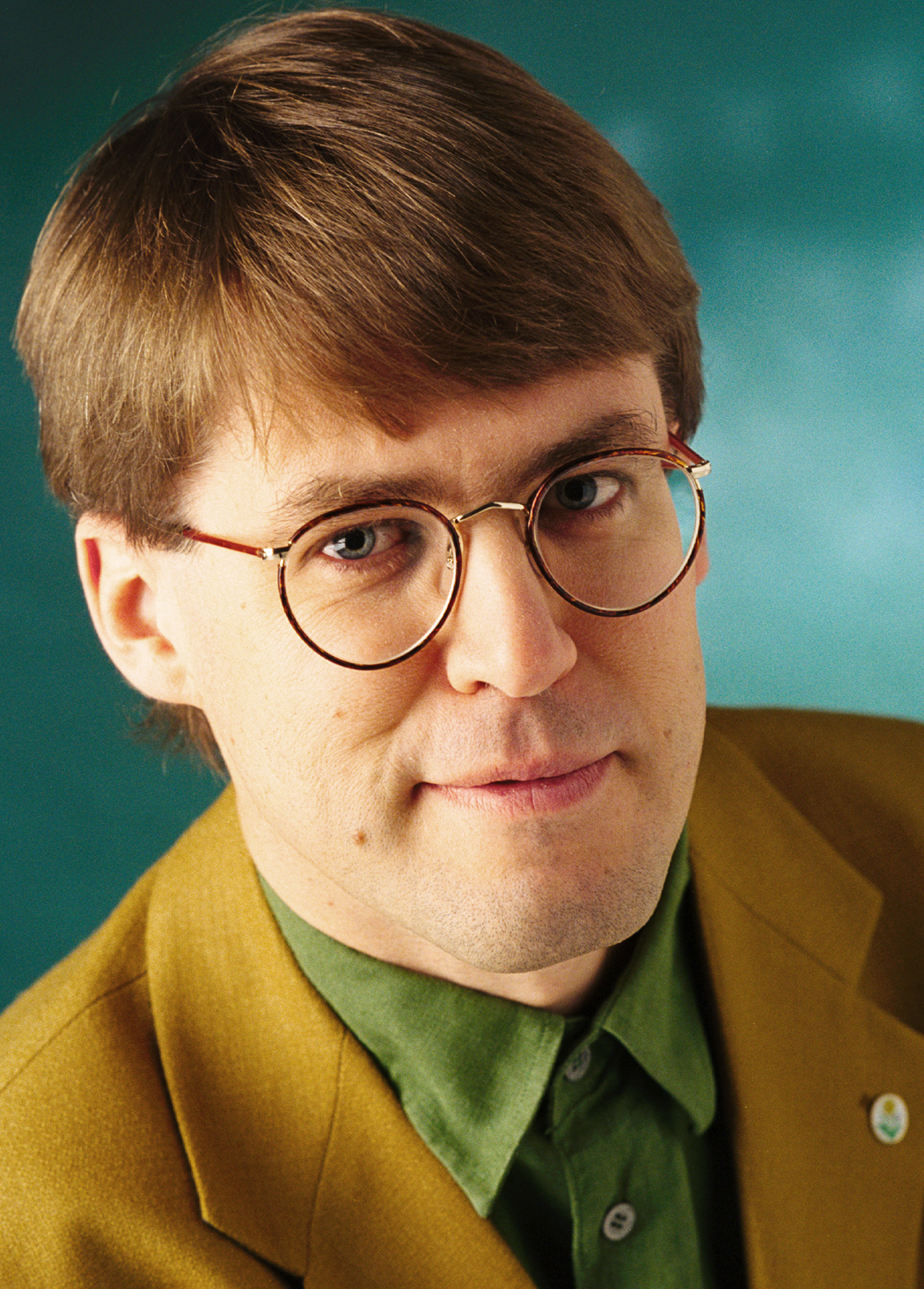
- Born: 1960 (age 65–66)
- Occupation: politician
- Known for: member of Riksdag since 1998
- Political party: Green Party

Mikael Johansson (born 1960) is a Swedish Green Party politician and a member of the Riksdag since 1998. In the Riksdag, Johansson was a member of the Transport Committee 1998–2005, the Constitution Committee 2006–2010 and the Riksdag Election Committee 2006–2010. He was also a substitute member of the Finance Committee, the Defence Committee, the Constitutional Committee, the Culture Committee, the Law Committee, the Environment and Agriculture Committee and the Transport Committee.
