= Murad Artin =

Swedish politician of Armenian descent

Member of the Riksdag
- In office 6 October 1998 – 30 September 2002
- Constituency: Örebro County

Municipal commissioner of Örebro Municipality
- In office 2002–2018

Personal details
- Born: 6 January 1960 (age 66) Iraq
- Party: Left Party

Murad Artin (born 6 January 1960) is a Swedish politician of Armenian descent and a member of the Left Party. He served as a member of the Riksdag, Sweden's national parliament, from 1998 to 2002, representing Örebro County, and was one of the Left Party's spokespersons on foreign policy. From 2002 to 2018, he served as a municipal commissioner in Örebro Municipality, where he was the Left Party's group leader.

== Early life ==
Artin was born in Iraq to an Armenian family. He lived in Iraq until 1980 and left the country because of his political activities. He was imprisoned and tortured twice in Iraq because of his political opinions. He subsequently travelled through Turkey and Poland before reaching Sweden in 1984."Murad Artin flydde till Sverige". Sveriges Television. 31 August 2015.

== Member of the Riksdag ==
Artin was elected to the Riksdag for the Left Party and served as an ordinary member from 6 October 1998 to 30 September 2002, representing Örebro County. During his parliamentary term he was a member of the Committee on Foreign Affairs and served in several parliamentary delegations.

Artin was one of the Left Party's spokespersons on foreign policy. His parliamentary work included questions concerning international human rights and conflicts. In April 2002 he questioned the Swedish government about measures Sweden could take internationally concerning democracy and human rights in Eritrea and the detention of Swedish-Eritrean journalist Dawit Isaak.

Artin also took an early parliamentary role in the issue of recognition of the Armenian genocide. In October 1999 he was the first signatory of a cross-party motion calling on the Swedish government to work within the United Nations and the European Union for Turkey to recognise the Armenian genocide.

In October 2000, Artin was again the first signatory of a cross-party motion concerning the genocide of Armenians, Assyrians/Syriacs and Chaldeans. The motion called for the subject to be addressed in international Holocaust-related conferences and for the Swedish government to recognise the genocide of Assyrians/Syriacs and Chaldeans as a historical fact.

== Municipal politics in Örebro ==
After leaving the Riksdag in 2002, Artin continued his political career in Örebro Municipality. He served as a municipal commissioner from 2002 until 2018 and was the Left Party's group leader throughout this period. He served in both governing and opposition roles."Artin (V) kvar som kommunalråd". Sveriges Television. 28 September 2014."Artin nytt oppositionsråd". Sveriges Radio. 11 November 2006.

Artin was a member of the Örebro Municipal Council and Municipal Executive Board. His municipal responsibilities included social welfare, integration, adult education and labour-market policy. During different periods he chaired or served as deputy chair of municipal committees and held senior positions in programme committees, including those dealing with adult education and labour-market issues, social welfare, growth and development, and urban development."Artin kvar som kommunalråd". Sveriges Television. 28 September 2014.

From 2002 onward, Artin was involved in municipal policy concerning adult education and the labour market. He was chair of the Adult Education and Labour Market Committee during several periods. Contemporary reports from 2005 and 2006 identify him as chair of the committee."Ung Refill ska hjälpa unga arbetslösa". Sveriges Radio. 15 April 2005."Artin nytt oppositionsråd". Sveriges Radio. 13 November 2006.

Artin also chaired Örebro Municipality's Gender Equality Delegation for several years. Municipal records identify him as its chair in 2015, 2017 and 2018."Vinnarna av jämställdhetspriset och tillgänglighetspriset". Örebro Municipality (Press release). 2018.

In 2018, Artin was described by the Örebro Left Party as its group leader and municipal commissioner. He left the municipal commissioner position at the end of the year, with Martha Wicklund subsequently taking over the role.

== Left Party leadership ==
Artin was elected to the Left Party's party board in 2004. He served on the party board from 2004 to 2008 and on its executive committee from 2004 to 2006. His responsibilities included international affairs and issues concerning the labour market and adult education."Murad Artin invald i vänsterpartiets partistyrelse". Sveriges Radio. 21 February 2004."Lokal V-ledare kritisk till Säpo". Sveriges Television. 25 June 2013.

== Recognition of the Armenian genocide ==
The Riksdag adopted a cross-party position in 2010 calling on the Swedish government to recognise the 1915 genocide of Armenians, Assyrians/Syriacs, Chaldeans and Pontic Greeks. The decision also called for international efforts concerning recognition and for Turkey to acknowledge the events.

Artin welcomed the Riksdag's decision and described it as an important recognition of the historical events."Riksdagen erkänner folkmord". Sveriges Radio. 22 March 2010.

== Memorial in Örebro ==
In 2007, Artin and the Left Party in Örebro proposed a motion for a memorial commemorating the genocide of Armenians, Assyrians/Syriacs and Chaldeans."First Armenian Genocide memorial inaugurated in Sweden". Hetq. 29 May 2015.

A memorial was inaugurated in Örebro in May 2015. The memorial commemorates the victims of the 1915 genocide and the migration of survivors to Sweden."First Armenian Genocide memorial inaugurated in Sweden". Hetq. 29 May 2015.

== Ukrainagruppen Örebro ==
Following Russia's full-scale invasion of Ukraine in 2022, Artin became chairman of Ukrainagruppen Örebro, a voluntary organisation assisting people who fled the war in Ukraine. The organisation has distributed donated goods and provided practical assistance to Ukrainian families in Örebro."Nya lokaler för Ukrainagruppen – tillgängligare än tidigare". Sveriges Radio. 3 November 2022.
