= Erik Larsson (politician) =

Swedish politician

Erik Larsson (May 29, 1918 – 2005) was a Swedish politician of the Centre Party.
