= Lennart Axelsson (politician) =

Swedish politician (born 1952)

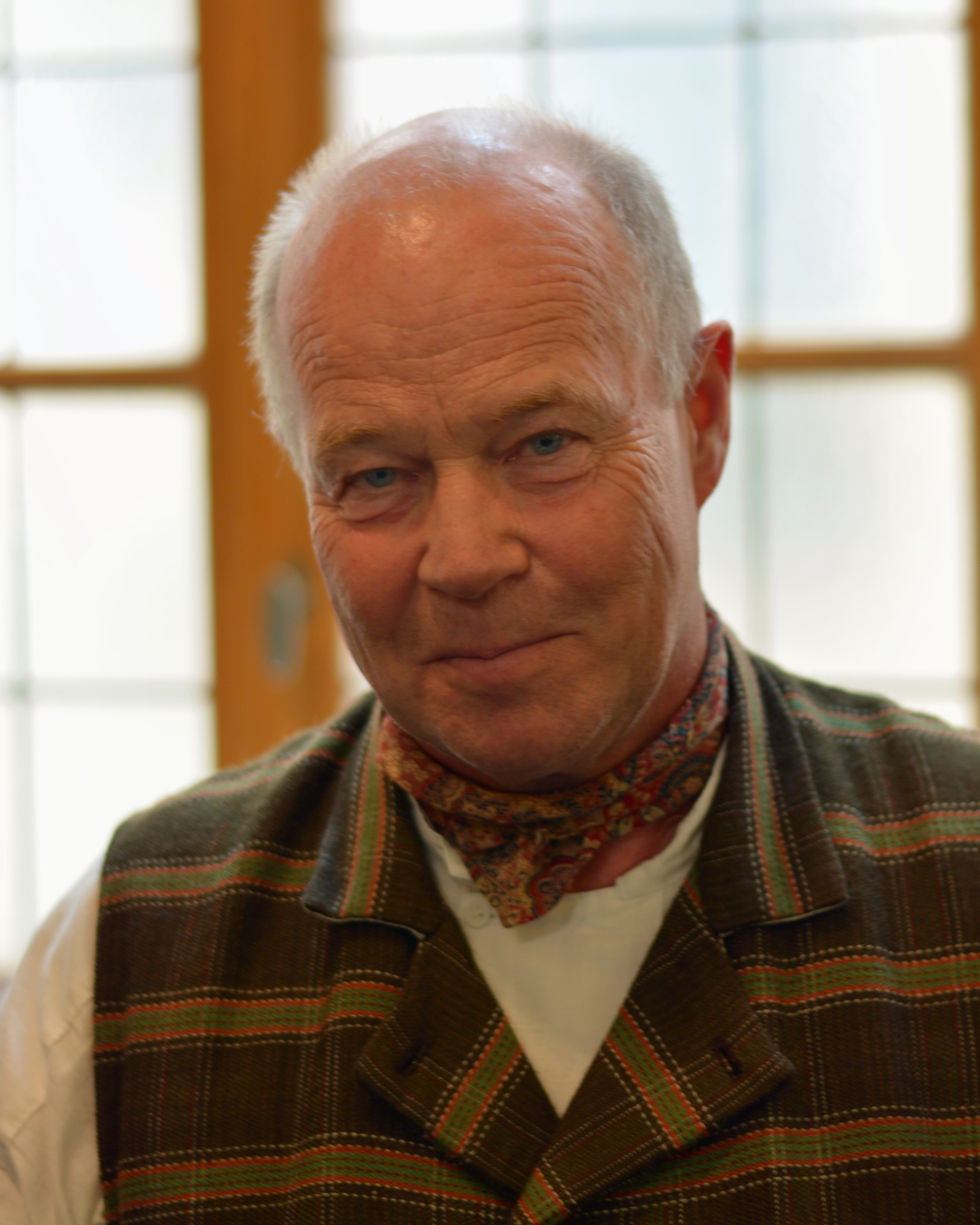

member of the Riksdag
- In office 2000–2018

Personal details
- Political party: Swedish Social Democratic Party

Lennart Axelsson (born 1952) is a Swedish politician who was a member of the Swedish Social Democratic Party in the Riksdag.

Axelsson was first elected to the Riksdag in 2000 and represented Örebro County. Within the Riksdag he was a member of the Social Committee and a deputy member of the Committee on Finance. He is also the Kvittningsman for his political party.
