= Sven Gunnar Persson =

Swedish politician (born 1955)

Sven Gunnar Persson (born 1955) is a Swedish Christian democratic politician, member of the Riksdag from 2002 to 2008.
