= Peter Pedersen (politician) =

Swedish politician (born 1954)

Peter Pedersen (born 1954) is a Swedish Left Party politician, member of the Riksdag from 1998 to 2010.
