= Helena Vilhelmsson =

Swedish politician (born 1965)

Member of the Riksdag
- Incumbent
- Assumed office 24 September 2018
- Constituency: Örebro County

Personal details
- Born: 1965 (age 60–61)
- Party: Centre Party

Helena Vilhelmsson (born 1965) is a Swedish politician. Since September 2018, she serves as Member of the Riksdag representing the constituency of Örebro County.

She was also elected as Member of the Riksdag in September 2022.
