= Helge Hagberg =

Swedish politician (1932–2019)

Helge Hagberg (21 February 1932 – 18 November 2019) was a Swedish politician for the Social Democratic Party.

He was born in Sunnemo. After starting as a forest labourer, he became active in the Swedish Social Democratic Youth League.

Hagberg held local office in Örebro. He was elected to the Swedish Riksdag on six occasions; in 1976, 1979, 1982, 1985 and 1988, ending his last term in 1991.
