= Eva-Lena Jansson =

Swedish politician (born 1963)

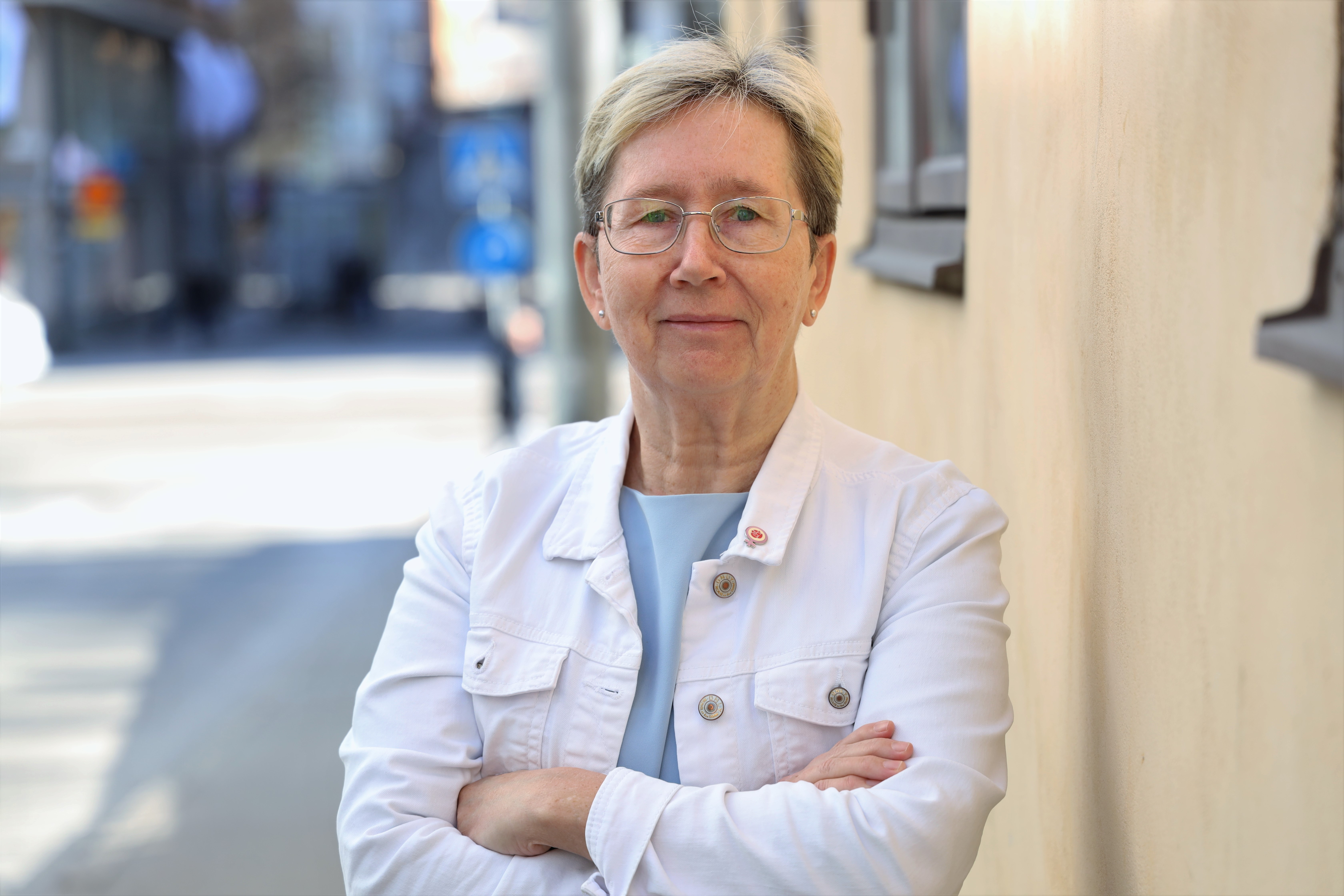

member of the Riksdag
- In office 2006–2022

Personal details
- Political party: Social Democratic

Eva-Lena Jansson (born 1963) is a Swedish Social Democratic politician. She was a member of the Riksdag from 2006 to 2022.
