= Helena Frisk =

Swedish politician (born 1965)

Helena Frisk (born 1965) is a Swedish politician of the Social Democratic Party. She was a member of the Riksdag from 1994 to 2006. Frisk has been a substitute member of the Riksdag since 2006, replacing Matilda Ernkrans.
