= Västra Götaland County East =

Constituency of the Riksdag, the national legislature of Sweden

- Västra Götalands Läns Östra
- Constituency for the Riksdag
- Location of Västra Götaland County East within Sweden
- Municipality: List: Essunga; Falköping; Götene; Grästorp; Gullspång; Hjo; Karlsborg; Lidköping; Mariestad; Skara; Skövde; Tibro; Tidaholm; Töreboda; Vara
- County: Västra Götaland
- Population: 269,467 (2025)
- Electorate: 210,115 (2026)
- Area: 10,247 km^{2} (2026)

Current constituency
- Created: 1970
- Seats: List (Note: Constituency seats only.): 8 (2022–present); 9 (1998–2022); 10 (1970–1998)
- Member of the Riksdag: List: Marcus Andersson (S); Tobias Andersson (SD); Sten Bergheden (M); Erik Ezelius (S); Josef Fransson (SD); Ulrika Heie (C); Dan Hovskär (KD); Therese Kristiansson (S); Charlotte Nordström (M)
- Created from: Skaraborg County

Västra Götaland County East (Swedish: Västra Götalands Läns Östra) is one of the 29 multi-member constituencies of the Riksdag, the national legislature of Sweden. The constituency was established as Skaraborg County in 1970 when the Riksdag changed from a bicameral legislature to a unicameral legislature. It was renamed Västra Götaland County East in 1998 when the counties of Älvsborg, Gothenburg and Bohus and Skaraborg were merged to create Västra Götaland. The constituency currently consists of the municipalities of Essunga, Falköping, Götene, Grästorp, Gullspång, Hjo, Karlsborg, Lidköping, Mariestad, Skara, Skövde, Tibro, Tidaholm, Töreboda and Vara. The constituency currently elects eight of the 349 members of the Riksdag using the open party-list proportional representation electoral system. At the 2026 general election it had 210,115 registered electors.

== Electoral system ==
Västra Götaland County East currently elects eight of the 349 members of the Riksdag using the open party-list proportional representation electoral system. Constituency seats are allocated using the modified Sainte-Laguë method. Only parties that reach the 4% national threshold and parties that receive at least 12% of the vote in the constituency compete for constituency seats. Supplementary levelling seats may also be allocated at the constituency level to parties that reach the 4% national threshold.

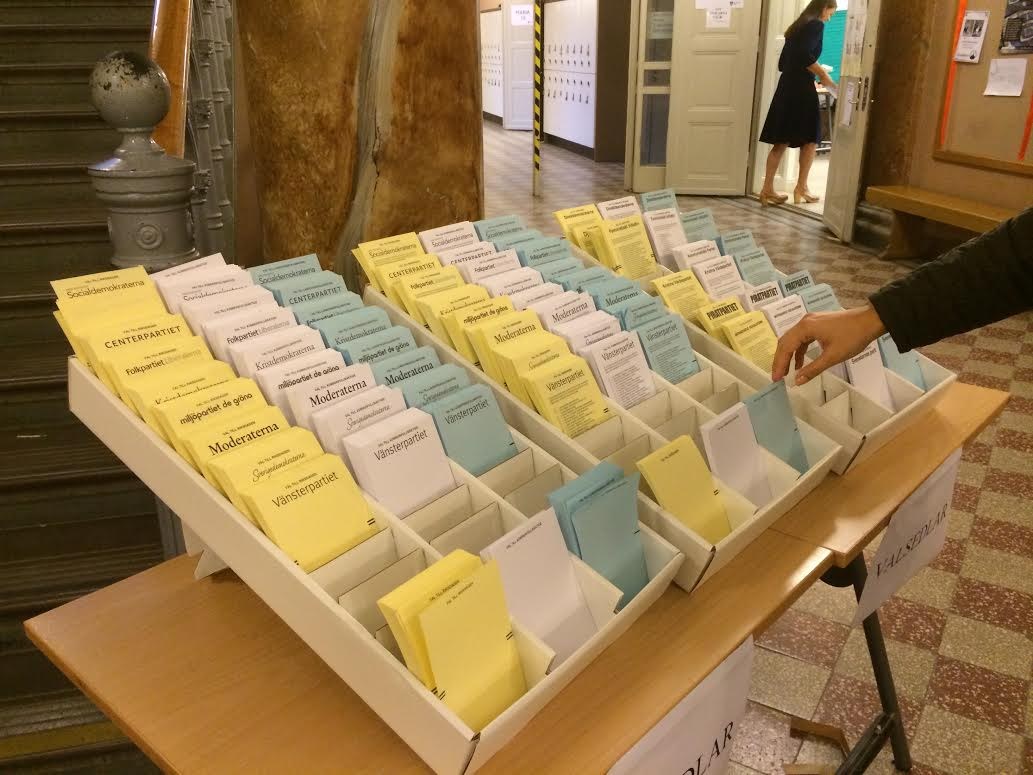
A selection of ballot papers available for voters at the 2014 general election in Stockholm - yellow for the Riksdag, blue for the regional council and white for the municipal council

Prior to 1997 voters could cast any ballot paper they wanted, though it had to contain the name of a party and the name of at least one candidate nominated by that party in the constituency. It was common for parties to hand out ballot papers with their name and list of candidates at the entrance of polling stations. Voters could delete the names of candidates or write-in the names of other candidates but in practice these options weren't used enough by voters to have any significant impact on the results and consequently elections operated as a closed system.

Since 1997, elections in Sweden follow the French model in having separate ballot papers for each party/list in a constituency. There are two ballot papers for each party - a party ballot paper (partivalsedel) with just the name of the party and a name ballot paper (namnvalsedel) with the name of the party and its list of candidates. There are also blank ballot papers (blank valsedel). Voters can initially pick as many ballot papers as they wish and then, in the secrecy of the voting booth, they select a single ballot paper of their choice. If they chose a name ballot paper they have the option of casting a preferential vote for one of their chosen party's candidates. If they chose a blank ballot paper they can write the name of any party including unregistered parties and, optionally, they can write the name of any person as their preferred candidate, even one that does not belong to their chosen party. They then place their chosen ballot paper in an envelope which is placed in the ballot box, discarding all other ballot papers they picked.

Seats won by each party/list in a constituency are allocated to its candidates in order of preference votes (a personal mandate), provided that the candidate has received at least 8% of votes cast for their party in the constituency (5% since January 2011). Any unfilled seats are then allocated to the party's remaining candidates in the order they appear on the party list (a party mandate).

== Election results ==
=== Summary ===
Election	Left V / VPK			Social Democrats S			Greens MP			Centre C			Liberals L / FP / F			Moderates M			Christian Democrats KD / KDS			Sweden Democrats SD		
Election	Votes	%	Seats	Votes	%	Seats	Votes	%	Seats	Votes	%	Seats	Votes	%	Seats	Votes	%	Seats	Votes	%	Seats	Votes	%	Seats
2026	10,390	5.80%	0	50,259	28.07%	3	7,282	4.07%	0	11,654	6.51%	0	7,924	4.43%	0	35,717	19.95%	2	14,363	8.02%	1	38,357	21.42%	2
2022	7,856	4.45%	0	55,421	31.40%	3	5,748	3.26%	0	11,667	6.61%	0	5,919	3.35%	0	32,790	18.58%	2	12,289	6.96%	1	42,572	24.12%	2
2018	10,106	5.71%	0	53,888	30.45%	3	5,425	3.06%	0	16,533	9.34%	1	7,662	4.33%	0	32,569	18.40%	2	13,837	7.82%	1	34,501	19.49%	2
2014	7,858	4.50%	0	60,424	34.64%	4	8,707	4.99%	0	14,295	8.19%	1	7,392	4.24%	0	36,579	20.97%	2	8,919	5.11%	0	25,765	14.77%	2
2010	8,223	4.88%	0	57,095	33.87%	4	9,440	5.60%	0	13,914	8.25%	1	10,387	6.16%	0	47,049	27.91%	3	11,092	6.58%	1	9,725	5.77%	0
2006	8,165	5.12%	0	61,219	38.41%	4	5,821	3.65%	0	16,655	10.45%	1	8,702	5.46%	0	37,484	23.52%	3	13,091	8.21%	1	4,883	3.06%	0
2002	11,634	7.58%	1	62,570	40.77%	4	5,714	3.72%	0	15,044	9.80%	1	15,273	9.95%	1	21,328	13.90%	1	18,859	12.29%	1	1,702	1.11%	0
1998	17,605	11.26%	1	56,475	36.11%	3	6,196	3.96%	0	12,606	8.06%	1	6,034	3.86%	0	30,254	19.34%	2	24,556	15.70%	2			
1994	9,854	5.50%	0	75,939	42.42%	5	9,353	5.22%	0	22,111	12.35%	1	10,512	5.87%	1	36,963	20.65%	2	10,374	5.79%	1			
1991	6,305	3.52%	0	61,063	34.13%	4	5,015	2.80%	0	22,998	12.85%	1	13,623	7.61%	1	35,732	19.97%	2	18,727	10.47%	1			
1988	6,938	3.96%	0	70,812	40.46%	5	8,556	4.89%	0	31,102	17.77%	2	20,263	11.58%	1	29,476	16.84%	2	7,591	4.34%	0			
1985	6,019	3.32%	0	72,915	40.23%	4	2,444	1.35%	0	36,347	20.05%	2	26,122	14.41%	2	37,047	20.44%	2	with C					
1982	6,191	3.42%	0	71,768	39.65%	4	2,163	1.19%	0	41,702	23.04%	3	11,534	6.37%	0	41,932	23.16%	3	5,474	3.02%	0			
1979	6,013	3.39%	0	64,305	36.29%	4				46,788	26.40%	3	18,284	10.32%	1	35,825	20.22%	2	4,228	2.39%	0			
1976	4,467	2.54%	0	61,075	34.75%	4				60,387	34.36%	3	18,832	10.72%	1	26,860	15.28%	2	3,764	2.14%	0			
1973	4,804	2.88%	0	59,408	35.65%	4				55,981	33.59%	3	16,630	9.98%	1	24,442	14.67%	2	5,040	3.02%	0			
1970	4,508	2.81%	0	57,686	35.91%	4				47,942	29.84%	3	24,964	15.54%	2	20,775	12.93%	1	4,513	2.81%	0			

(Excludes levelling seats. Figures in italics represent alliances/joint lists.)

=== Detailed ===
Party has received at least 4% of the vote nationally and is entitled to compete for constituency seats.

==== 2020s ====
===== 2026 =====
Results of the 2026 general election held on 13 September 2026:

Party		Votes per municipality															Total votes	%	Seats		
Party		Ess- unga	Fal- köping	Götene	Gräs- torp	Gulls- pång	Hjo	Karls- borg	Lid- köping	Marie- stad	Skara	Skövde	Tibro	Tida- holm	Töre- boda	Vara	Total votes	%	Con.	Lev.	Tot.
Swedish Social Democratic Party	S	851	5,999	2,448	888	949	1,671	1,264	8,510	5,070	3,303	10,612	2,121	2,813	1,548	2,212	50,259	28.07%	3	0	3
Sweden Democrats	SD	1,003	4,586	1,905	1,048	805	1,305	1,177	5,498	3,315	2,639	7,114	1,658	2,065	1,484	2,755	38,357	21.42%	2	0	2
Moderate Party	M	816	3,888	1,506	825	578	1,305	1,044	5,375	3,555	2,378	8,214	1,337	1,252	1,107	2,537	35,717	19.95%	2	0	2
Christian Democrats	KD	267	1,871	801	341	192	614	443	2,214	1,121	800	3,043	673	820	414	749	14,363	8.02%	1	0	1
Centre Party	C	253	1,420	700	313	183	409	369	1,740	946	779	2,594	446	394	399	709	11,654	6.51%	0	1	1
Left Party	V	153	1,469	528	109	186	280	194	1,571	900	891	2,482	393	358	397	479	10,390	5.80%	0	0	0
Liberals	L	147	931	402	173	100	321	258	1,363	630	475	1,763	366	366	205	424	7,924	4.43%	0	0	0
Green Party	MP	127	948	453	128	104	353	154	1,238	663	514	1,690	205	293	158	254	7,282	4.07%	0	0	0
Örebro Party	ÖP	22	148	33	17	29	49	33	118	93	49	185	67	51	60	90	1,044	0.58%	0	0	0
Alternative for Sweden	AfS	18	88	33	15	16	25	21	149	77	79	175	42	47	43	47	875	0.49%	0	0	0
Christian Values Party	KrVP	5	46	20	2	8	7	6	42	22	19	106	8	15	21	9	336	0.19%	0	0	0
Ambition Sweden	AS	4	41	16	7	10	13	8	23	31	7	35	7	18	9	11	240	0.13%	0	0	0
Pirate Party	PP	1	22	11	4	1	5	1	21	13	15	68	6	10	2	1	181	0.10%	0	0	0
Human Rights and Democracy	MoD	2	25	9	5	4	7	5	19	5	17	17	6	8	3	5	137	0.08%	0	0	0
Communist Party of Sweden	SKP	0	7	10	0	5	0	2	3	5	1	46	1	0	0	0	80	0.04%	0	0	0
Citizens' Coalition	MED	1	14	5	2	0	4	2	6	3	1	32	0	0	1	3	74	0.04%	0	0	0
Direct Democrats	DD	1	4	0	0	4	0	0	5	1	4	6	0	0	1	0	26	0.01%	0	0	0
Nordic Resistance Movement	NMR	0	3	0	0	0	0	1	0	3	4	3	0	0	1	1	16	0.01%	0	0	0
Independent Rural Party	LPo	1	2	0	0	0	0	1	3	0	0	2	1	2	0	2	14	0.01%	0	0	0
Donald Duck Party		0	0	1	1	0	0	0	0	1	1	3	0	2	0	1	10	0.01%	0	0	0
United Voice	ER	0	2	0	1	0	0	0	2	0	0	1	0	0	0	3	9	0.01%	0	0	0
Viking		0	7	0	0	0	0	0	1	0	0	0	0	0	0	0	8	0.00%	0	0	0
RegleraAI.nu		2	3	0	1	0	0	0	0	0	0	1	0	0	0	0	7	0.00%	0	0	0
Volt Sweden	Volt	0	1	0	0	0	0	0	1	0	0	3	0	0	0	2	7	0.00%	0	0	0
The Push Buttons	Kn	0	1	2	1	0	0	0	2	0	0	0	0	0	0	0	6	0.00%	0	0	0
Unity	ENH	0	1	0	0	0	0	1	2	0	0	1	0	0	0	0	5	0.00%	0	0	0
United Sweden		0	0	0	0	0	0	0	0	1	0	2	0	0	1	0	4	0.00%	0	0	0
Nuance Party	PNy	0	0	0	0	0	0	0	1	0	0	2	0	0	0	0	3	0.00%	0	0	0
Classical Liberal Party	KLP	0	0	0	0	0	0	0	0	1	0	0	0	0	0	1	2	0.00%	0	0	0
Evil Chicken Party	OKP	0	1	0	0	1	0	0	0	0	0	0	0	0	0	0	2	0.00%	0	0	0
Turning Point Party	PV	0	0	0	0	0	0	0	1	0	1	0	0	0	0	0	2	0.00%	0	0	0
A Good Sweden		0	0	0	1	0	0	0	0	0	0	0	0	0	0	0	1	0.00%	0	0	0
Communist Party	K	0	1	0	0	0	0	0	0	0	0	0	0	0	0	0	1	0.00%	0	0	0
For the Good of All		0	0	0	0	0	1	0	0	0	0	0	0	0	0	0	1	0.00%	0	0	0
John Party with Extra Moose		0	0	0	0	0	0	0	0	0	0	0	0	1	0	0	1	0.00%	0	0	0
Pax		0	0	0	0	0	0	0	0	0	0	0	0	0	1	0	1	0.00%	0	0	0
People's List		0	0	0	0	0	0	0	0	0	0	1	0	0	0	0	1	0.00%	0	0	0
Proxy Party		0	0	0	0	0	0	0	0	1	0	0	0	0	0	0	1	0.00%	0	0	0
Sensible Party		0	0	0	0	0	0	0	0	1	0	0	0	0	0	0	1	0.00%	0	0	0
Valid votes		3,674	21,529	8,883	3,882	3,175	6,369	4,984	27,908	16,458	11,977	38,201	7,337	8,515	5,855	10,295	179,042	100.00%	8	1	9
Blank votes		40	222	119	51	46	69	62	332	228	134	408	68	103	85	142	2,109	1.16%			
Rejected votes – unregistered parties		0	4	3	0	0	1	2	9	3	3	5	0	1	2	2	35	0.02%			
Rejected votes – other		1	21	12	2	2	1	3	13	27	6	21	0	2	2	3	116	0.06%			
Total polled		3,715	21,776	9,017	3,935	3,223	6,440	5,051	28,262	16,716	12,120	38,635	7,405	8,621	5,944	10,442	181,302	86.29%			
Registered electors		4,268	25,296	10,309	4,515	3,875	7,306	5,696	32,096	19,351	14,430	44,934	8,767	9,919	7,070	12,283	210,115				
Turnout		87.04%	86.08%	87.47%	87.15%	83.17%	88.15%	88.68%	88.05%	86.38%	83.99%	85.98%	84.46%	86.91%	84.07%	85.01%	86.29%				

The following candidates were elected:

- Constituency seats (personal mandates) - Sten Bergheden (M), 2,081 votes; and Charlotte Nordström (M), 1,799 votes.
- Constituency seats (party mandates) - Marcus Andersson (S), 739 votes; Tobias Andersson (SD), 817 votes; Erik Ezelius (S), 1,598 votes; Josef Fransson (SD), 74 votes; Dan Hovskär (KD), 316 votes; and Therese Kristiansson (S), 1,271 votes.
- Levelling seats (personal mandates) - Ulrika Heie (C), 825 votes.

===== 2022 =====
Results of the 2022 general election held on 11 September 2022:

Party		Votes per municipality															Total votes	%	Seats		
Party		Ess- unga	Fal- köping	Götene	Gräs- torp	Gulls- pång	Hjo	Karls- borg	Lid- köping	Marie- stad	Skara	Skövde	Tibro	Tida- holm	Töre- boda	Vara	Total votes	%	Con.	Lev.	Tot.
Swedish Social Democratic Party	S	1,021	6,224	2,884	980	1,139	1,849	1,486	9,325	5,625	3,774	11,481	2,288	3,003	1,758	2,584	55,421	31.40%	3	0	3
Sweden Democrats	SD	1,133	5,259	2,096	1,161	971	1,415	1,302	5,866	3,771	2,916	7,628	1,846	2,366	1,754	3,088	42,572	24.12%	2	0	2
Moderate Party	M	767	3,627	1,441	795	469	1,168	813	4,818	3,350	2,236	7,663	1,174	1,173	1,019	2,277	32,790	18.58%	2	0	2
Christian Democrats	KD	225	1,595	722	267	164	592	407	1,797	952	712	2,587	622	650	332	665	12,289	6.96%	1	0	1
Centre Party	C	309	1,491	671	368	195	415	336	1,758	910	778	2,375	452	450	384	775	11,667	6.61%	0	1	1
Left Party	V	134	1,022	394	104	153	250	170	1,356	750	553	1,740	266	343	228	393	7,856	4.45%	0	0	0
Liberals	L	71	662	285	125	74	217	202	1,069	399	375	1,452	312	262	141	273	5,919	3.35%	0	0	0
Green Party	MP	93	723	351	94	74	278	121	1,054	521	416	1,310	173	219	132	189	5,748	3.26%	0	0	0
Alternative for Sweden	AfS	16	54	23	14	21	18	15	63	49	41	90	16	22	38	27	507	0.29%	0	0	0
Nuance Party	PNy	0	76	4	4	4	2	6	50	14	20	63	20	15	39	5	322	0.18%	0	0	0
Pirate Party	PP	0	49	11	3	1	7	1	42	27	18	109	7	11	5	2	293	0.17%	0	0	0
Christian Values Party	KrVP	2	43	24	0	13	9	5	39	30	9	67	12	8	12	4	277	0.16%	0	0	0
Citizens' Coalition	MED	1	33	12	2	0	12	8	40	12	16	71	13	3	4	9	236	0.13%	0	0	0
The Push Buttons	Kn	2	28	10	4	5	9	2	21	22	13	32	10	4	5	8	175	0.10%	0	0	0
Human Rights and Democracy	MoD	6	13	7	14	0	10	5	33	4	3	10	2	7	1	9	124	0.07%	0	0	0
Feminist Initiative	FI	3	7	0	2	7	5	3	10	5	2	15	4	3	4	8	78	0.04%	0	0	0
Direct Democrats	DD	1	7	1	0	1	1	0	5	1	10	19	2	2	4	0	54	0.03%	0	0	0
Independent Rural Party	LPo	0	8	6	1	1	3	0	3	3	0	3	0	13	2	7	50	0.03%	0	0	0
Unity	ENH	0	8	3	1	0	1	0	8	2	4	6	0	2	3	1	39	0.02%	0	0	0
Climate Alliance	KA	2	2	0	0	0	1	0	1	8	2	11	0	2	1	3	33	0.02%	0	0	0
Nordic Resistance Movement	NMR	0	2	5	0	1	0	0	1	3	2	4	2	0	5	0	25	0.01%	0	0	0
Communist Party of Sweden	SKP	0	0	1	0	4	0	0	0	1	2	3	1	0	5	1	18	0.01%	0	0	0
Sweden Out of the EU/ Free Justice Party	FRP	2	0	0	4	0	0	0	1	0	0	5	0	0	0	1	13	0.01%	0	0	0
Basic Income Party	BASIP	0	0	0	0	0	0	0	1	1	0	1	1	0	0	0	4	0.00%	0	0	0
Hard Line Sweden		0	0	0	0	2	0	0	0	0	0	1	0	1	0	0	4	0.00%	0	0	0
Reform Party		0	0	0	0	0	0	0	4	0	0	0	0	0	0	0	4	0.00%	0	0	0
Turning Point Party	PV	0	0	0	0	0	0	0	1	2	1	0	0	0	0	0	4	0.00%	0	0	0
Classical Liberal Party	KLP	0	0	0	0	0	0	0	0	1	0	1	0	0	0	0	2	0.00%	0	0	0
My Sweden		0	0	0	0	0	0	0	0	0	0	1	0	0	0	0	1	0.00%	0	0	0
Swexit Party		0	0	0	0	0	0	0	0	0	1	0	0	0	0	0	1	0.00%	0	0	0
Valid votes		3,788	20,933	8,951	3,943	3,299	6,262	4,882	27,366	16,463	11,904	36,748	7,223	8,559	5,876	10,329	176,526	100.00%	8	1	9
Blank votes		36	223	97	52	53	57	68	264	247	145	411	74	112	92	122	2,053	1.15%			
Rejected votes – unregistered parties		0	7	2	1	1	3	2	3	3	1	10	1	12	0	1	47	0.03%			
Rejected votes – other		5	19	3	5	6	4	2	25	32	11	29	7	3	7	6	164	0.09%			
Total polled		3,829	21,182	9,053	4,001	3,359	6,326	4,954	27,658	16,745	12,061	37,198	7,305	8,686	5,975	10,458	178,790	86.14%			
Registered electors		4,380	24,879	10,275	4,530	4,029	7,214	5,557	31,517	19,407	14,210	43,681	8,641	9,966	7,055	12,219	207,560				
Turnout		87.42%	85.14%	88.11%	88.32%	83.37%	87.69%	89.15%	87.76%	86.28%	84.88%	85.16%	84.54%	87.16%	84.69%	85.59%	86.14%				

The following candidates were elected:

- Constituency seats (personal mandates) - Sten Bergheden (M), 2,270 votes; and Ebba Busch (KD), 3,130 votes.
- Constituency seats (party mandates) - Tobias Andersson (SD), 451 votes; Patrik Björck (S), 779 votes; Erik Ezelius (S), 1,499 votes; Jörgen Grubb (SD), 0 votes; Charlotte Nordström (M), 1,373 votes; and Carina Ohlsson (S), 1,599 votes.
- Levelling seats (personal mandates) - Ulrika Heie (C), 674 votes.

Permanent substitutions:

- Carina Ohlsson (S) resigned on 26 September 2022 upon being appointed to the European Parliament and was replaced by Ida Ekeroth Clausson (S) on the same day.

==== 2010s ====
===== 2018 =====
Results of the 2018 general election held on 9 September 2018:

Party		Votes per municipality															Total votes	%	Seats		
Party		Ess- unga	Fal- köping	Götene	Gräs- torp	Gulls- pång	Hjo	Karls- borg	Lid- köping	Marie- stad	Skara	Skövde	Tibro	Tida- holm	Töre- boda	Vara	Total votes	%	Con.	Lev.	Tot.
Swedish Social Democratic Party	S	970	6,173	2,755	1,015	1,202	1,709	1,377	9,068	5,415	3,726	10,561	2,240	3,245	1,812	2,620	53,888	30.45%	3	0	3
Sweden Democrats	SD	862	4,409	1,675	918	809	1,216	1,093	4,724	2,887	2,477	6,210	1,516	1,848	1,372	2,485	34,501	19.49%	2	0	2
Moderate Party	M	771	3,545	1,366	832	470	1,162	781	4,727	3,266	2,370	7,660	1,168	1,162	1,027	2,262	32,569	18.40%	2	0	2
Centre Party	C	453	2,095	895	509	291	613	520	2,431	1,355	1,032	3,226	596	634	646	1,237	16,533	9.34%	1	0	1
Christian Democrats	KD	255	1,922	838	284	184	600	415	1,978	1,200	843	2,947	694	598	391	688	13,837	7.82%	1	0	1
Left Party	V	217	1,251	555	127	200	387	247	1,742	977	731	2,064	333	488	275	512	10,106	5.71%	0	1	1
Liberals	L	100	779	353	140	84	252	258	1,340	606	446	2,068	398	295	184	359	7,662	4.33%	0	0	0
Green Party	MP	93	648	318	81	75	222	108	979	508	444	1,245	162	222	119	201	5,425	3.06%	0	0	0
Feminist Initiative	FI	10	78	21	11	31	31	9	93	49	45	182	13	17	20	17	627	0.35%	0	0	0
Alternative for Sweden	AfS	15	46	14	18	9	16	22	57	71	45	124	18	26	29	34	544	0.31%	0	0	0
Pirate Party	PP	0	62	11	4	4	7	2	50	14	23	86	5	11	10	17	306	0.17%	0	0	0
Citizens' Coalition	MED	3	28	15	3	2	5	8	43	19	20	103	11	10	5	15	290	0.16%	0	0	0
Independent Rural Party	LPo	3	13	10	5	6	6	6	9	9	12	26	3	15	16	8	147	0.08%	0	0	0
Unity	ENH	6	26	12	1	2	6	2	12	4	14	23	3	9	5	11	136	0.08%	0	0	0
Direct Democrats	DD	2	15	3	1	2	2	2	13	13	10	38	6	5	4	8	124	0.07%	0	0	0
Animals' Party	DjuP	1	7	11	1	1	0	1	5	0	2	39	0	2	4	16	90	0.05%	0	0	0
Christian Values Party	KrVP	1	8	2	0	6	0	1	22	4	1	20	2	0	2	7	76	0.04%	0	0	0
Nordic Resistance Movement	NMR	0	6	3	0	3	0	2	5	8	6	20	7	0	10	4	74	0.04%	0	0	0
Classical Liberal Party	KLP	0	3	0	0	2	0	1	4	0	2	4	0	1	4	1	22	0.01%	0	0	0
Basic Income Party	BASIP	0	1	2	0	0	2	0	1	1	0	6	0	0	0	3	16	0.01%	0	0	0
Communist Party of Sweden	SKP	0	0	0	0	6	0	0	0	0	0	0	0	0	1	0	7	0.00%	0	0	0
Initiative	INI	0	2	1	0	0	0	0	0	0	1	1	0	0	0	0	5	0.00%	0	0	0
Parties not on the ballot	ÖVR	2	3	0	2	0	0	1	0	3	0	1	1	1	2	0	16	0.01%	0	0	0
Valid votes		3,764	21,120	8,860	3,952	3,389	6,236	4,856	27,303	16,409	12,250	36,654	7,176	8,589	5,938	10,505	177,001	100.00%	9	1	10
Blank votes		37	176	105	40	46	68	68	265	173	109	357	66	91	80	126	1,807	1.01%			
Rejected votes – unregistered parties		0	6	1	1	1	1	2	7	6	4	6	2	5	2	7	51	0.03%			
Rejected votes – other		1	9	8	0	0	1	10	12	6	5	27	3	2	1	3	88	0.05%			
Total polled		3,802	21,311	8,974	3,993	3,436	6,306	4,936	27,587	16,594	12,368	37,044	7,247	8,687	6,021	10,641	178,947	88.18%			
Registered electors		4,322	24,387	10,064	4,492	3,990	7,094	5,451	30,824	18,967	14,109	42,110	8,224	9,803	6,924	12,175	202,936				
Turnout		87.97%	87.39%	89.17%	88.89%	86.12%	88.89%	90.55%	89.50%	87.49%	87.66%	87.97%	88.12%	88.62%	86.96%	87.40%	88.18%				

The following candidates were elected:

- Constituency seats (personal mandates) - Sten Bergheden (M), 2,594 votes; Ebba Busch (KD), 3,232 votes; Ulrika Carlsson (C), 1,399 votes; and Cecilia Widegren (M), 2,054 votes.
- Constituency seats (party mandates) - Tobias Andersson (SD), 168 votes; Patrik Björck (S), 1,542 votes; Erik Ezelius (S), 1,134 votes; Josef Fransson (SD), 231 votes; and Carina Ohlsson (S), 1,776 votes.
- Levelling seats (personal mandates) - Jessica Thunander (V), 539 votes.

===== 2014 =====
Results of the 2014 general election held on 14 September 2014:

Party		Votes per municipality															Total votes	%	Seats		
Party		Ess- unga	Fal- köping	Götene	Gräs- torp	Gulls- pång	Hjo	Karls- borg	Lid- köping	Marie- stad	Skara	Skövde	Tibro	Tida- holm	Töre- boda	Vara	Total votes	%	Con.	Lev.	Tot.
Swedish Social Democratic Party	S	1,135	6,820	3,173	1,181	1,435	1,877	1,689	9,641	5,968	4,249	11,618	2,683	3,764	2,117	3,074	60,424	34.64%	4	0	4
Moderate Party	M	895	4,195	1,669	908	542	1,404	827	5,280	3,524	2,643	8,399	1,225	1,307	1,094	2,667	36,579	20.97%	2	0	2
Sweden Democrats	SD	590	3,696	1,136	608	556	883	854	3,329	2,179	1,976	4,507	1,214	1,433	1,031	1,773	25,765	14.77%	2	0	2
Centre Party	C	422	1,940	827	501	268	473	470	1,868	1,032	955	2,605	530	539	719	1,146	14,295	8.19%	1	0	1
Christian Democrats	KD	159	1,279	550	160	128	388	278	1,433	746	521	1,751	510	360	234	422	8,919	5.11%	0	1	1
Green Party	MP	153	1,040	423	139	106	335	173	1,559	820	660	2,029	320	380	220	350	8,707	4.99%	0	0	0
Left Party	V	140	888	458	152	179	279	153	1,507	843	540	1,405	260	396	242	416	7,858	4.50%	0	0	0
Liberal People's Party	FP	105	707	335	127	81	311	289	1,363	581	439	1,963	338	253	157	343	7,392	4.24%	0	0	0
Feminist Initiative	FI	69	387	182	47	63	108	63	489	266	242	700	112	107	83	117	3,035	1.74%	0	0	0
Pirate Party	PP	15	77	27	16	9	12	12	102	78	44	273	22	21	15	31	754	0.43%	0	0	0
Unity	ENH	2	20	7	7	6	6	5	18	5	12	42	2	9	4	4	149	0.09%	0	0	0
Party of the Swedes	SVP	0	6	11	1	2	0	1	32	5	13	38	7	16	5	3	140	0.08%	0	0	0
Christian Values Party	KrVP	1	16	3	0	5	4	0	35	0	9	18	4	1	6	7	109	0.06%	0	0	0
Independent Rural Party	LBPo	2	10	9	3	2	7	3	6	3	12	3	2	12	8	11	93	0.05%	0	0	0
Animals' Party	DjuP	1	7	1	2	3	0	2	23	7	5	11	3	0	2	5	72	0.04%	0	0	0
Classical Liberal Party	KLP	0	3	2	0	2	3	0	1	1	6	10	0	1	1	2	32	0.02%	0	0	0
Direct Democrats		0	0	1	0	0	0	0	5	1	5	6	1	0	2	3	24	0.01%	0	0	0
Health Party		0	1	0	0	0	0	0	1	0	0	1	0	0	0	1	4	0.00%	0	0	0
Communist Party of Sweden	SKP	0	0	0	0	2	0	0	0	0	0	1	0	0	0	0	3	0.00%	0	0	0
Progressive Party		0	1	1	0	0	0	0	0	0	0	0	0	0	0	0	2	0.00%	0	0	0
New Party		0	1	0	0	0	0	0	0	0	0	0	0	0	0	0	1	0.00%	0	0	0
Peace Democrats		0	0	0	0	1	0	0	0	0	0	0	0	0	0	0	1	0.00%	0	0	0
Socialist Justice Party	RS	0	0	0	0	0	0	0	0	0	0	1	0	0	0	0	1	0.00%	0	0	0
Swedish Senior Citizen Interest Party	SPI	0	1	0	0	0	0	0	0	0	0	0	0	0	0	0	1	0.00%	0	0	0
Parties not on the ballot		3	8	10	1	4	3	2	6	6	1	24	2	4	4	7	85	0.05%	0	0	0
Valid votes		3,692	21,103	8,825	3,853	3,394	6,093	4,821	26,698	16,065	12,332	35,405	7,235	8,603	5,944	10,382	174,445	100.00%	9	1	10
Blank votes		36	187	110	42	28	73	52	268	196	128	366	47	95	68	141	1,837	1.04%			
Rejected votes – other		3	3	2	1	0	4	1	6	4	3	17	2	1	1	2	50	0.03%			
Total polled		3,731	21,293	8,937	3,896	3,422	6,170	4,874	26,972	16,265	12,463	35,788	7,284	8,699	6,013	10,525	176,332	87.17%			
Registered electors		4,300	24,417	10,114	4,487	4,012	6,993	5,501	30,574	18,932	14,312	41,105	8,309	9,925	7,072	12,241	202,294				
Turnout		86.77%	87.21%	88.36%	86.83%	85.29%	88.23%	88.60%	88.22%	85.91%	87.08%	87.06%	87.66%	87.65%	85.03%	85.98%	87.17%				

The following candidates were elected:

- Constituency seats (personal mandates) - Urban Ahlin (S), 3,453 votes; Sten Bergheden (M), 2,038 votes; Ulrika Carlsson (C), 1,604 votes; and Cecilia Widegren (M), 3,402 votes.
- Constituency seats (party mandates) - Patrik Björck (S), 964 votes; Christoffer Dulny (SD), 1 votes; Monica Green (S), 1,951 votes; Margareta Larsson (SD), 8 votes; and Carina Ohlsson (S), 2,120 votes.
- Levelling seats (personal mandates) - Annika Eclund (KD), 934 votes.

Permanent substitutions:

- Christoffer Dulny (SD) resigned on 29 September 2014 and was replaced by Robert Stenkvist (Note: The Riksdag website incorrectly gives Stenkvist's constituency as Stockholm County.) (SD) on 30 September 2014.

===== 2010 =====
Results of the 2010 general election held on 19 September 2010:

Party		Votes per municipality															Total votes	%	Seats		
Party		Ess- unga	Fal- köping	Götene	Gräs- torp	Gulls- pång	Hjo	Karls- borg	Lid- köping	Marie- stad	Skara	Skövde	Tibro	Tida- holm	Töre- boda	Vara	Total votes	%	Con.	Lev.	Tot.
Swedish Social Democratic Party	S	1,081	6,356	3,003	1,170	1,536	1,831	1,556	9,095	5,762	4,140	10,342	2,485	3,678	2,169	2,891	57,095	33.87%	4	0	4
Moderate Party	M	1,158	5,669	2,214	1,210	794	1,716	1,244	6,792	4,363	3,537	10,105	1,597	1,848	1,427	3,375	47,049	27.91%	3	0	3
Centre Party	C	464	1,892	760	541	262	434	509	1,842	821	878	2,512	496	569	667	1,267	13,914	8.25%	1	0	1
Christian Democrats	KD	236	1,595	709	161	187	501	303	1,687	884	667	2,110	681	432	306	633	11,092	6.58%	1	0	1
Liberal People's Party	FP	186	1,055	538	199	170	448	356	1,734	864	697	2,428	493	419	226	574	10,387	6.16%	0	1	1
Sweden Democrats	SD	228	1,580	415	240	217	307	270	1,307	806	677	1,750	435	524	373	596	9,725	5.77%	0	0	0
Green Party	MP	154	1,079	553	138	128	391	201	1,651	948	763	2,106	300	404	248	376	9,440	5.60%	0	0	0
Left Party	V	142	949	423	135	177	274	155	1,462	917	552	1,569	292	456	296	424	8,223	4.88%	0	0	0
Pirate Party	PP	32	117	49	17	18	33	28	136	115	70	312	28	42	30	54	1,081	0.64%	0	0	0
Feminist Initiative	FI	5	49	18	8	7	11	4	56	34	40	90	14	14	8	24	382	0.23%	0	0	0
Rural Democrats		0	1	9	1	1	0	0	0	4	0	2	0	1	6	0	25	0.01%	0	0	0
Party of the Swedes	SVP	0	0	0	13	0	0	0	5	0	0	2	0	0	0	2	22	0.01%	0	0	0
Freedom Party		0	6	0	0	0	1	0	1	1	0	3	0	3	0	2	17	0.01%	0	0	0
National Democrats	ND	0	3	0	0	0	0	0	2	0	7	2	0	1	2	0	17	0.01%	0	0	0
Classical Liberal Party	KLP	0	0	1	0	0	0	0	2	0	0	3	0	0	3	1	10	0.01%	0	0	0
Swedish Senior Citizen Interest Party	SPI	0	5	0	1	0	0	0	0	0	0	0	0	0	1	0	7	0.00%	0	0	0
Socialist Justice Party	RS	0	0	0	0	0	0	0	0	0	0	6	0	0	0	0	6	0.00%	0	0	0
Spirits Party		0	1	0	0	0	0	0	1	1	1	1	0	0	0	0	5	0.00%	0	0	0
Unity	ENH	0	0	0	0	0	1	0	0	0	3	1	0	0	0	0	5	0.00%	0	0	0
Health Care Party	Sjvåp	0	0	0	0	0	2	0	0	0	1	1	0	0	0	0	4	0.00%	0	0	0
Communist Party of Sweden	SKP	0	1	0	0	0	0	0	0	0	0	2	0	0	0	0	3	0.00%	0	0	0
Norrland Coalition Party	NorrS	0	0	0	0	0	0	0	2	0	0	0	0	0	0	1	3	0.00%	0	0	0
Active Democracy		0	1	0	0	0	0	0	0	0	0	0	0	0	0	0	1	0.00%	0	0	0
Communist League	KommF	0	0	0	0	0	0	0	0	0	0	1	0	0	0	0	1	0.00%	0	0	0
Free Justice Party	FRP	0	1	0	0	0	0	0	0	0	0	0	0	0	0	0	1	0.00%	0	0	0
Parties not on the ballot		0	7	2	0	0	0	0	7	6	5	12	2	3	1	1	46	0.03%	0	0	0
Valid votes		3,686	20,367	8,694	3,834	3,497	5,950	4,626	25,782	15,526	12,038	33,360	6,823	8,394	5,763	10,221	168,561	100.00%	9	1	10
Blank votes		54	245	125	59	53	72	96	304	230	135	472	96	118	99	139	2,297	1.34%			
Rejected votes – other		3	5	2	1	1	0	1	8	5	4	13	5	0	0	4	52	0.03%			
Total polled		3,743	20,617	8,821	3,894	3,551	6,022	4,723	26,094	15,761	12,177	33,845	6,924	8,512	5,862	10,364	170,910	85.32%			
Registered electors		4,373	24,339	10,153	4,503	4,191	7,006	5,480	29,961	18,803	14,270	39,683	8,160	9,891	7,157	12,352	200,322				
Turnout		85.59%	84.71%	86.88%	86.48%	84.73%	85.95%	86.19%	87.09%	83.82%	85.33%	85.29%	84.85%	86.06%	81.91%	83.91%	85.32%				

The following candidates were elected:

- Constituency seats (personal mandates) - Ulrika Carlsson (C), 1,989 votes; Annika Eclund (KD), 1,054 votes; and Cecilia Widegren (M), 5,659 votes.
- Constituency seats (party mandates) - Urban Ahlin (S), 3,979 votes; Sten Bergheden (M), 1,553 votes; Patrik Björck (S), 1,356 votes; Lars Elinderson (M), 1,266 votes; Monica Green (S), 2,690 votes; and Carina Ohlsson (S), 2,255 votes.
- Levelling seats (party mandates) - Christer Winbäck (FP), 561 votes.

==== 2000s ====
===== 2006 =====
Results of the 2006 general election held on 17 September 2006:

Party		Votes per municipality															Total votes	%	Seats		
Party		Ess- unga	Fal- köping	Götene	Gräs- torp	Gulls- pång	Hjo	Karls- borg	Lid- köping	Marie- stad	Skara	Skövde	Tibro	Tida- holm	Töre- boda	Vara	Total votes	%	Con.	Lev.	Tot.
Swedish Social Democratic Party	S	1,065	7,066	3,090	1,190	1,482	1,995	1,773	9,432	6,204	4,427	11,625	2,642	3,850	2,191	3,187	61,219	38.41%	4	0	4
Moderate Party	M	977	4,389	1,684	1,075	612	1,442	996	5,349	3,485	2,936	7,885	1,291	1,364	1,167	2,832	37,484	23.52%	3	0	3
Centre Party	C	651	2,464	876	598	384	514	607	2,102	999	1,053	2,726	642	682	770	1,587	16,655	10.45%	1	0	1
Christian Democrats	KD	269	1,887	867	233	242	565	334	2,094	1,135	775	2,291	675	572	380	772	13,091	8.21%	1	0	1
Liberal People's Party	FP	165	871	441	165	160	333	275	1,280	719	708	2,089	458	334	221	483	8,702	5.46%	0	1	1
Left Party	V	154	938	379	130	181	246	172	1,524	898	557	1,552	299	440	286	409	8,165	5.12%	0	1	1
Green Party	MP	108	709	312	88	104	247	127	1,021	565	477	1,240	188	235	170	230	5,821	3.65%	0	0	0
Sweden Democrats	SD	103	816	205	83	126	168	118	676	438	346	939	217	261	165	222	4,883	3.06%	0	0	0
Pirate Party	PP	27	137	59	25	7	34	25	147	73	65	245	62	68	32	53	1,059	0.66%	0	0	0
June List	JL	22	113	37	16	87	25	30	80	94	76	156	37	30	44	39	886	0.56%	0	0	0
Feminist Initiative	FI	12	80	34	12	11	31	16	89	57	63	154	32	30	24	48	693	0.43%	0	0	0
Health Care Party	Sjvåp	6	20	7	11	8	6	16	56	18	8	30	9	6	20	12	233	0.15%	0	0	0
Swedish Senior Citizen Interest Party	SPI	2	22	4	2	29	4	11	10	31	2	40	3	7	17	6	190	0.12%	0	0	0
People's Will		0	29	11	3	3	2	4	6	2	4	4	6	1	0	4	79	0.05%	0	0	0
National Socialist Front	NSF	5	1	0	15	0	0	0	3	3	4	3	0	2	0	15	51	0.03%	0	0	0
Unity	ENH	2	5	2	3	0	5	0	5	6	5	7	1	2	0	2	45	0.03%	0	0	0
New Future	NYF	0	0	2	0	3	0	0	3	5	5	6	1	0	3	3	31	0.02%	0	0	0
National Democrats	ND	0	1	0	0	0	0	0	19	0	0	2	0	1	1	6	30	0.02%	0	0	0
Unique Party		0	5	0	0	0	1	0	0	1	1	4	0	13	3	0	28	0.02%	0	0	0
Women's Power		0	6	0	0	0	0	0	0	0	0	1	0	0	0	2	9	0.01%	0	0	0
Socialist Justice Party	RS	0	0	0	0	1	0	0	0	0	0	2	0	1	0	0	4	0.00%	0	0	0
Classical Liberal Party	KLP	0	0	0	0	0	0	0	2	0	0	1	0	0	0	0	3	0.00%	0	0	0
Active Democracy		0	0	1	0	0	0	0	0	0	0	0	0	0	0	0	1	0.00%	0	0	0
Communist Party of Sweden	SKP	0	0	0	0	0	0	0	0	1	0	0	0	0	0	0	1	0.00%	0	0	0
Parties not on the ballot		2	2	2	0	0	3	0	3	2	2	4	0	0	4	1	25	0.02%	0	0	0
Valid votes		3,570	19,561	8,013	3,649	3,440	5,621	4,504	23,901	14,736	11,514	31,006	6,563	7,899	5,498	9,913	159,388	100.00%	9	2	11
Blank votes		77	344	147	61	57	109	137	448	294	216	632	112	149	119	184	3,086	1.90%			
Rejected votes – other		1	9	26	5	1	1	0	5	4	1	11	3	3	2	3	75	0.05%			
Total polled		3,648	19,914	8,186	3,715	3,498	5,731	4,641	24,354	15,034	11,731	31,649	6,678	8,051	5,619	10,100	162,549	82.49%			
Registered electors		4,415	24,077	9,773	4,478	4,243	6,896	5,530	29,043	18,476	14,271	38,481	8,156	9,618	7,171	12,419	197,047				
Turnout		82.63%	82.71%	83.76%	82.96%	82.44%	83.11%	83.92%	83.85%	81.37%	82.20%	82.25%	81.88%	83.71%	78.36%	81.33%	82.49%				

The following candidates were elected:

- Constituency seats (personal mandates) - Ulrika Carlsson (C), 1,599 votes; Holger Gustafsson (KD), 1,482 votes; and Cecilia Widegren (M), 4,827 votes.
- Constituency seats (party mandates) - Urban Ahlin (S), 2,708 votes; Patrik Björck (S), 1,482 votes; Lars Elinderson (M), 1,785 votes; Monica Green (S), 2,980 votes; Charlotte Nordström (M), 978 votes; and Carina Ohlsson (S), 2,195 votes.
- Levelling seats (party mandates) - Egon Frid (V), 592 votes; and Christer Winbäck (FP), 484 votes.

Permanent substitutions:

- Charlotte Nordström (M) resigned on 15 November 2006 and was replaced by Sten Bergheden (M) on 16 November 2006.

===== 2002 =====
Results of the 2002 general election held on 15 September 2002:

Party		Votes per municipality															Total votes	%	Seats		
Party		Ess- unga	Fal- köping	Götene	Gräs- torp	Gulls- pång	Hjo	Karls- borg	Lid- köping	Marie- stad	Skara	Skövde	Tibro	Tida- holm	Töre- boda	Vara	Total votes	%	Con.	Lev.	Tot.
Swedish Social Democratic Party	S	1,165	7,000	3,218	1,181	1,483	2,055	1,932	9,921	6,183	4,643	12,058	2,691	3,794	2,089	3,157	62,570	40.77%	4	0	4
Moderate Party	M	627	2,673	917	649	402	817	602	2,745	1,859	1,629	4,301	754	770	727	1,856	21,328	13.90%	1	0	1
Christian Democrats	KD	434	2,773	1,114	438	377	820	550	2,591	1,609	1,162	3,435	904	880	581	1,191	18,859	12.29%	1	0	1
Liberal People's Party	FP	306	1,595	723	334	236	617	424	2,298	1,438	1,139	3,603	680	651	388	841	15,273	9.95%	1	0	1
Centre Party	C	661	2,257	864	603	370	456	452	1,826	880	991	2,217	515	638	779	1,535	15,044	9.80%	1	0	1
Left Party	V	200	1,297	635	186	279	374	275	2,159	1,246	863	2,091	459	649	392	529	11,634	7.58%	1	0	1
Green Party	MP	94	743	308	104	135	203	140	844	619	441	1,161	223	246	197	256	5,714	3.72%	0	0	0
Sweden Democrats	SD	12	281	82	43	94	51	24	155	240	89	307	49	59	121	95	1,702	1.11%	0	0	0
New Future	NYF	12	15	50	12	21	35	22	122	58	15	51	40	1	1	15	470	0.31%	0	0	0
Swedish Senior Citizen Interest Party	SPI	6	20	9	1	51	10	12	16	36	10	168	6	10	32	6	393	0.26%	0	0	0
Socialist Party	SOC.P	0	0	1	0	0	1	0	22	0	1	0	0	0	0	0	25	0.02%	0	0	0
Unity	ENH	0	2	0	0	0	0	0	0	1	1	2	0	3	0	0	9	0.01%	0	0	0
Rikshushållarna	Riksh	0	0	0	0	0	0	0	1	0	0	1	0	0	0	0	2	0.00%	0	0	0
Socialist Justice Party	RS	0	1	1	0	0	0	0	0	0	0	0	0	0	0	0	2	0.00%	0	0	0
Communist League	KommF	0	0	0	0	0	0	0	0	0	0	0	1	0	0	0	1	0.00%	0	0	0
The Communists	KOMM	0	0	0	0	0	0	0	0	1	0	0	0	0	0	0	1	0.00%	0	0	0
European Workers Party	EAP	0	1	0	0	0	0	0	0	0	0	0	0	0	0	0	1	0.00%	0	0	0
Other parties	ÖVR	13	73	15	1	9	5	7	154	9	31	82	16	15	15	11	456	0.30%	0	0	0
Valid votes		3,530	18,731	7,937	3,552	3,457	5,444	4,440	22,854	14,179	11,015	29,477	6,338	7,716	5,322	9,492	153,484	100.00%	9	0	9
Rejected votes		70	318	129	55	51	91	98	321	259	152	593	96	119	116	149	2,617	1.68%			
Total polled		3,600	19,049	8,066	3,607	3,508	5,535	4,538	23,175	14,438	11,167	30,070	6,434	7,835	5,438	9,641	156,101	80.52%			
Registered electors		4,394	23,611	9,773	4,480	4,395	6,830	5,541	28,361	18,224	13,943	37,307	8,030	9,565	7,148	12,263	193,865				
Turnout		81.93%	80.68%	82.53%	80.51%	79.82%	81.04%	81.90%	81.71%	79.23%	80.09%	80.60%	80.12%	81.91%	76.08%	78.62%	80.52%				

The following candidates were elected:

- Constituency seats (personal mandates) - Birgitta Carlsson (C), 2,361 votes; Holger Gustafsson (KD), 2,572 votes; and Cecilia Widegren (M), 2,883 votes.
- Constituency seats (party mandates) - Urban Ahlin (S), 2,167 votes; Monica Green (S), 2,921 votes; Kjell Nordström (S), 4,228 votes; Carina Ohlsson (S), 2,389 votes; Per Rosengren (V), 862 votes; and Christer Winbäck (FP), 1,178 votes.

==== 1990s ====
===== 1998 =====
Results of the 1998 general election held on 20 September 1998:

Party		Votes per municipality															Total votes	%	Seats		
Party		Ess- unga	Fal- köping	Götene	Gräs- torp	Gulls- pång	Hjo	Karls- borg	Lid- köping	Marie- stad	Skara	Skövde	Tibro	Tida- holm	Töre- boda	Vara	Total votes	%	Con.	Lev.	Tot.
Swedish Social Democratic Party	S	1,041	6,260	2,922	1,040	1,380	1,812	1,886	8,722	5,695	4,227	10,764	2,478	3,538	1,995	2,715	56,475	36.11%	3	1	4
Moderate Party	M	830	3,700	1,372	887	616	1,156	801	3,952	2,553	2,357	6,438	1,094	1,064	966	2,468	30,254	19.34%	2	0	2
Christian Democrats	KD	536	3,550	1,429	611	506	1,037	775	3,258	2,199	1,480	4,424	1,170	1,154	826	1,601	24,556	15.70%	2	0	2
Left Party	V	279	1,995	974	309	546	633	483	3,004	1,941	1,181	3,079	804	931	674	772	17,605	11.26%	1	0	1
Centre Party	C	559	1,850	747	468	325	357	320	1,570	718	825	1,843	442	479	723	1,380	12,606	8.06%	1	0	1
Green Party	MP	148	847	330	107	209	235	166	864	576	498	1,160	241	238	251	326	6,196	3.96%	0	0	0
Liberal People's Party	FP	110	622	313	138	72	301	185	928	510	469	1,263	308	362	147	306	6,034	3.86%	0	0	0
Other parties		68	334	119	52	65	78	76	477	222	145	485	65	139	103	238	2,666	1.70%	0	0	0
Valid votes		3,571	19,158	8,206	3,612	3,719	5,609	4,692	22,775	14,414	11,182	29,456	6,602	7,905	5,685	9,806	156,392	100.00%	9	1	10
Rejected votes		70	393	161	84	74	100	122	467	339	234	690	115	157	154	207	3,367	2.11%			
Total polled		3,641	19,551	8,367	3,696	3,793	5,709	4,814	23,242	14,753	11,416	30,146	6,717	8,062	5,839	10,013	159,759	81.93%			
Registered electors		4,408	23,920	9,942	4,485	4,604	6,822	5,764	28,077	18,362	14,001	36,916	8,096	9,733	7,413	12,457	195,000				
Turnout		82.60%	81.73%	84.16%	82.41%	82.38%	83.69%	83.52%	82.78%	80.35%	81.54%	81.66%	82.97%	82.83%	78.77%	80.38%	81.93%				

The following candidates were elected:

- Constituency seats (personal mandates) - Birgitta Carlsson (C), 2,512 votes; Lars Hjertén (M), 2,703 votes; Kjell Nordström (S), 4,712 votes; and Per Rosengren (V), 1,800 votes.
- Constituency seats (party mandates) - Urban Ahlin (S), 1,489 votes; Lars Elinderson (M), 2,105 votes; Monica Green (S), 3,221 votes; Holger Gustafsson (KD), 1,020 votes; and Ulla-Britt Hagström (KD), 227 votes.
- Levelling seats (party mandates) - Carina Ohlsson (S), 2,180 votes.

===== 1994 =====
Results of the 1994 general election held on 18 September 1994:

Party		Votes per municipality																	Total votes	%	Seats		
Party		Ess- unga	Fal- köping	Götene	Gräs- torp	Gulls- pång	Habo	Hjo	Karls- borg	Lid- köping	Marie- stad	Mullsjö	Skara	Skövde	Tibro	Tida- holm	Töre- boda	Vara	Total votes	%	Con.	Lev.	Tot.
Swedish Social Democratic Party	S	1,234	8,073	3,742	1,318	1,912	2,136	2,414	2,423	11,017	7,407	1,709	5,140	13,728	3,198	4,477	2,613	3,398	75,939	42.42%	5	0	5
Moderate Party	M	931	4,529	1,591	1,028	700	1,300	1,322	1,020	4,437	3,166	898	2,605	6,817	1,291	1,298	1,246	2,784	36,963	20.65%	2	0	2
Centre Party	C	877	3,204	1,149	771	503	599	613	594	2,560	1,313	473	1,364	2,984	730	943	1,177	2,257	22,111	12.35%	1	0	1
Liberal People's Party	FP	203	1,000	553	175	152	359	389	266	1,555	859	264	677	2,214	572	519	214	541	10,512	5.87%	1	0	1
Christian Democratic Unity	KDS	166	1,385	612	175	220	748	424	225	1,128	824	677	506	1,464	558	440	325	497	10,374	5.79%	1	0	1
Left Party	V	136	1,115	491	175	253	229	275	242	1,694	1,155	219	586	1,648	370	502	374	390	9,854	5.50%	0	1	1
Green Party	MP	173	1,211	488	222	225	275	318	271	1,230	880	291	760	1,507	313	321	327	541	9,353	5.22%	0	1	1
New Democracy	NyD	81	252	178	70	54	100	76	110	285	285	58	306	418	114	139	90	201	2,817	1.57%	0	0	0
Other parties		12	108	43	14	38	73	46	22	108	124	41	40	235	54	68	30	47	1,103	0.62%	0	0	0
Valid votes		3,813	20,877	8,847	3,948	4,057	5,819	5,877	5,173	24,014	16,013	4,630	11,984	31,015	7,200	8,707	6,396	10,656	179,026	100.00%	10	2	12
Rejected votes		40	315	138	53	55	113	71	115	345	248	82	189	472	77	135	126	175	2,749	1.51%			
Total polled		3,853	21,192	8,985	4,001	4,112	5,932	5,948	5,288	24,359	16,261	4,712	12,173	31,487	7,277	8,842	6,522	10,831	181,775	87.23%			
Registered electors		4,474	24,357	10,106	4,601	4,778	6,625	6,901	5,964	27,754	18,874	5,150	14,024	36,079	8,305	9,955	7,748	12,696	208,391				
Turnout		86.12%	87.01%	88.91%	86.96%	86.06%	89.54%	86.19%	88.67%	87.77%	86.16%	91.50%	86.80%	87.27%	87.62%	88.82%	84.18%	85.31%	87.23%				

The following candidates were elected: Urban Ahlin (S); Birgitta Carlsson (C); Eva Eriksson (FP); Monica Green (S); Holger Gustafsson (KDS); Birgitta Johansson (S); Anders Nilsson (S); Annika Nordgren (MP); Kjell Nordström (S); Per Rosengren (V); Sten Svensson (M); and G. Ivar Virgin (M).

Permanent substitutions:

- G. Ivar Virgin (M) resigned on 8 October 1995 and was replaced by Lars Hjertén (M) on 9 October 1995.

===== 1991 =====
Results of the 1991 general election held on 15 September 1991:

Party		Votes per municipality																	Total votes	%	Seats		
Party		Ess- unga	Fal- köping	Götene	Gräs- torp	Gulls- pång	Habo	Hjo	Karls- borg	Lid- köping	Marie- stad	Mullsjö	Skara	Skövde	Tibro	Tida- holm	Töre- boda	Vara	Total votes	%	Con.	Lev.	Tot.
Swedish Social Democratic Party	S	888	6,511	2,936	927	1,538	1,667	1,977	2,049	8,916	6,126	1,274	4,224	10,960	2,568	3,799	2,098	2,605	61,063	34.13%	4	0	4
Moderate Party	M	849	4,748	1,527	925	654	1,208	1,269	1,107	4,299	3,140	863	2,589	6,160	1,246	1,302	1,163	2,683	35,732	19.97%	2	0	2
Centre Party	C	895	3,218	1,248	802	611	522	643	679	2,852	1,480	459	1,445	2,984	734	1,053	1,244	2,129	22,998	12.85%	1	1	2
Christian Democratic Unity	KDS	364	2,559	1,001	390	348	1,164	755	538	2,039	1,502	968	1,035	2,755	897	759	586	1,067	18,727	10.47%	1	0	1
New Democracy	NyD	425	1,622	722	402	366	448	461	377	1,706	1,297	333	959	2,324	588	646	639	1,282	14,597	8.16%	1	0	1
Liberal People's Party	FP	264	1,311	649	256	227	447	464	399	1,985	1,157	334	1,025	2,775	674	638	335	683	13,623	7.61%	1	0	1
Left Party	V	81	841	320	88	184	128	147	143	1,256	658	123	376	973	219	313	209	246	6,305	3.52%	0	0	0
Green Party	MP	80	588	221	101	130	165	181	150	640	497	153	494	844	156	165	182	268	5,015	2.80%	0	0	0
Other parties		14	46	27	11	16	36	15	24	79	86	28	53	260	70	30	22	35	852	0.48%	0	0	0
Valid votes		3,860	21,444	8,651	3,902	4,074	5,785	5,912	5,466	23,772	15,943	4,535	12,200	30,035	7,152	8,705	6,478	10,998	178,912	100.00%	10	1	11
Rejected votes		45	315	138	52	63	76	102	81	325	267	59	194	549	102	157	125	148	2,798	1.54%			
Total polled		3,905	21,759	8,789	3,954	4,137	5,861	6,014	5,547	24,097	16,210	4,594	12,394	30,584	7,254	8,862	6,603	11,146	181,710	87.45%			
Registered electors		4,456	24,626	9,882	4,519	4,846	6,526	6,862	6,240	27,525	18,851	5,052	14,141	35,220	8,331	9,980	7,853	12,873	207,783				
Turnout		87.63%	88.36%	88.94%	87.50%	85.37%	89.81%	87.64%	88.89%	87.55%	85.99%	90.93%	87.65%	86.84%	87.07%	88.80%	84.08%	86.58%	87.45%				

The following candidates were elected: Birgitta Carlsson (C); Jan Fransson (S); Holger Gustafsson (KDS); Birgitta Johansson (S); Bengt Kindbom (C); Lars Moquist (NyD); Anders Nilsson (S); Bengt Rosén (FP); Sven-Gösta Signell (S); Sten Svensson (M); and G. Ivar Virgin (M).

Permanent substitutions:

- Jan Fransson (S) resigned on 17 April 1994 and was replaced by Kjell Nordström (S) on 18 April 1994.

==== 1980s ====
===== 1988 =====
Results of the 1988 general election held on 18 September 1988:

Party		Votes per municipality																	Total votes	%	Seats		
Party		Ess- unga	Fal- köping	Götene	Gräs- torp	Gulls- pång	Habo	Hjo	Karls- borg	Lid- köping	Marie- stad	Mullsjö	Skara	Skövde	Tibro	Tida- holm	Töre- boda	Vara	Total votes	%	Con.	Lev.	Tot.
Swedish Social Democratic Party	S	1,004	7,753	3,386	1,130	1,805	1,819	2,298	2,516	10,028	6,855	1,498	5,037	12,721	3,052	4,267	2,461	3,182	70,812	40.46%	5	0	5
Centre Party	C	1,156	4,887	1,461	1,073	805	791	886	903	3,497	2,072	671	1,851	3,877	1,039	1,428	1,604	3,101	31,102	17.77%	2	0	2
Moderate Party	M	831	3,547	1,270	810	604	1,002	1,123	826	3,406	2,657	717	2,096	5,025	939	1,123	1,042	2,458	29,476	16.84%	2	0	2
Liberal People's Party	FP	382	2,157	1,029	412	340	722	694	614	2,790	1,922	484	1,355	3,836	1,086	851	528	1,061	20,263	11.58%	1	0	1
Green Party	MP	161	951	392	190	200	236	260	296	1,162	840	223	729	1,480	295	348	306	487	8,556	4.89%	0	1	1
Christian Democratic Unity	KDS	109	964	516	104	129	616	343	166	887	560	555	360	1,083	358	312	219	310	7,591	4.34%	0	0	0
Left Party – Communists	VPK	95	753	314	90	152	133	197	162	1,272	775	136	419	1,376	277	331	230	226	6,938	3.96%	0	0	0
Other parties		4	23	3	4	6	1	6	8	21	51	8	19	49	7	34	8	11	263	0.15%	0	0	0
Valid votes		3,742	21,035	8,371	3,813	4,041	5,320	5,807	5,491	23,063	15,732	4,292	11,866	29,447	7,053	8,694	6,398	10,836	175,001	100.00%	10	1	11
Rejected votes		42	218	99	47	37	57	57	49	232	199	64	125	347	58	102	68	125	1,926	1.09%			
Total polled		3,784	21,253	8,470	3,860	4,078	5,377	5,864	5,540	23,295	15,931	4,356	11,991	29,794	7,111	8,796	6,466	10,961	176,927	86.37%			
Registered electors		4,394	24,496	9,647	4,475	4,807	6,082	6,749	6,214	27,098	18,825	4,838	13,868	34,555	8,213	9,993	7,805	12,786	204,845				
Turnout		86.12%	86.76%	87.80%	86.26%	84.83%	88.41%	86.89%	89.15%	85.97%	84.63%	90.04%	86.47%	86.22%	86.58%	88.02%	82.84%	85.73%	86.37%				

The following candidates were elected: Gunilla André (C); Jan Fransson (S); Carl Frick (MP); Birgitta Johansson (S); Bengt Kindbom (C); Anders Nilsson (S); Kjell Nordström (S); Bengt Rosén (FP); Sven-Gösta Signell (S); Sten Svensson (M); and G. Ivar Virgin (M).

===== 1985 =====
Results of the 1985 general election held on 15 September 1985:

Party		Votes per municipality																	Total votes	%	Seats		
Party		Ess- unga	Fal- köping	Götene	Gräs- torp	Gulls- pång	Habo	Hjo	Karls- borg	Lid- köping	Marie- stad	Mullsjö	Skara	Skövde	Tibro	Tida- holm	Töre- boda	Vara	Total votes	%	Con.	Lev.	Tot.
Swedish Social Democratic Party	S	986	7,907	3,492	1,088	1,947	1,849	2,382	2,652	10,437	7,269	1,492	4,944	13,049	3,189	4,426	2,607	3,199	72,915	40.23%	4	1	5
Moderate Party	M	1,079	4,607	1,569	924	811	1,227	1,416	1,002	4,405	3,337	865	2,563	6,155	1,201	1,439	1,314	3,133	37,047	20.44%	2	0	2
Centre Party	C	1,251	5,598	1,761	1,167	948	1,252	1,130	932	3,972	2,426	1,065	2,104	4,546	1,313	1,706	1,839	3,337	36,347	20.05%	2	0	2
Liberal People's Party	FP	521	2,886	1,387	630	464	874	824	851	3,615	2,188	671	1,856	4,782	1,303	1,046	727	1,497	26,122	14.41%	2	0	2
Left Party – Communists	VPK	68	679	249	76	163	102	163	135	1,136	618	95	397	1,248	221	310	191	168	6,019	3.32%	0	0	0
Green Party	MP	26	273	103	47	56	60	72	72	301	352	76	226	416	74	102	93	95	2,444	1.35%	0	0	0
Other parties		3	25	16	4	9	18	7	2	43	32	8	113	36	6	10	7	12	351	0.19%	0	0	0
Valid votes		3,934	21,975	8,577	3,936	4,398	5,382	5,994	5,646	23,909	16,222	4,272	12,203	30,232	7,307	9,039	6,778	11,441	181,245	100.00%	10	1	11
Rejected votes		25	146	62	32	35	46	42	59	185	132	41	111	260	53	75	75	87	1,466	0.80%			
Total polled		3,959	22,121	8,639	3,968	4,433	5,428	6,036	5,705	24,094	16,354	4,313	12,314	30,492	7,360	9,114	6,853	11,528	182,711	90.14%			
Registered electors		4,376	24,458	9,488	4,421	4,903	5,879	6,643	6,194	26,923	18,284	4,649	13,628	34,003	8,182	9,967	7,791	12,897	202,686				
Turnout		90.47%	90.44%	91.05%	89.75%	90.41%	92.33%	90.86%	92.11%	89.49%	89.44%	92.77%	90.36%	89.67%	89.95%	91.44%	87.96%	89.39%	90.14%				

The following candidates were elected: Gunilla André (C); Jan Fransson (S); Olle Grahn (FP); Birgitta Johansson (S); Bengt Kindbom (C); Anders Nilsson (S); Kjell Nordström (S); Bengt Rosén (FP); Sven-Gösta Signell (S); Sten Svensson (M); and G. Ivar Virgin (M).

===== 1982 =====
Results of the 1982 general election held on 19 September 1982:

Party		Votes per municipality																	Total votes	%	Seats		
Party		Ess- unga	Fal- köping	Götene	Gräs- torp	Gulls- pång	Habo	Hjo	Karls- borg	Lid- köping	Marie- stad	Mullsjö	Skara	Skövde	Tibro	Tida- holm	Töre- boda	Vara	Total votes	%	Con.	Lev.	Tot.
Swedish Social Democratic Party	S	961	7,930	3,391	1,029	1,999	1,788	2,308	2,728	10,295	7,265	1,401	4,831	12,567	3,199	4,389	2,639	3,048	71,768	39.65%	4	1	5
Moderate Party	M	1,236	5,043	1,858	1,015	867	1,394	1,491	1,231	5,003	3,826	974	2,989	7,059	1,394	1,627	1,473	3,452	41,932	23.16%	3	0	3
Centre Party	C	1,382	6,307	1,873	1,353	1,097	1,114	1,189	1,158	4,788	2,847	883	2,614	5,679	1,559	1,904	2,090	3,865	41,702	23.04%	3	0	3
Liberal People's Party	FP	286	1,338	695	265	197	375	378	331	1,765	932	252	826	1,907	571	439	278	699	11,534	6.37%	0	1	1
Left Party – Communists	VPK	83	691	247	76	137	98	178	115	1,174	545	103	445	1,317	255	346	192	189	6,191	3.42%	0	0	0
Christian Democratic Unity	KDS	76	668	386	65	120	413	246	126	599	457	422	241	734	288	249	142	242	5,474	3.02%	0	0	0
Green Party	MP	30	270	95	48	58	44	63	76	262	247	67	172	397	57	76	77	124	2,163	1.19%	0	0	0
K-Party	K-P	3	0	0	0	0	0	2	0	0	3	0	1	2	0	7	0	3	21	0.01%	0	0	0
Other parties		4	19	4	7	6	2	7	6	14	24	4	51	42	10	12	9	14	235	0.13%	0	0	0
Valid votes		4,061	22,266	8,549	3,858	4,481	5,228	5,862	5,771	23,900	16,146	4,106	12,170	29,704	7,333	9,049	6,900	11,636	181,020	100.00%	10	2	12
Rejected votes		28	147	45	24	40	37	51	43	182	134	32	116	269	77	64	56	80	1,425	0.78%			
Total polled		4,089	22,413	8,594	3,882	4,521	5,265	5,913	5,814	24,082	16,280	4,138	12,286	29,973	7,410	9,113	6,956	11,716	182,445	91.50%			
Registered electors		4,430	24,457	9,338	4,275	4,924	5,590	6,455	6,257	26,482	17,827	4,449	13,406	32,937	8,083	9,844	7,784	12,865	199,403				
Turnout		92.30%	91.64%	92.03%	90.81%	91.82%	94.19%	91.60%	92.92%	90.94%	91.32%	93.01%	91.65%	91.00%	91.67%	92.57%	89.36%	91.07%	91.50%				

The following candidates were elected: Gunilla André (C); Jan Fransson (S); Olle Grahn (FP); Ingemar Hallenius (C); Lars Hjertén (M); Paul Jansson (S); Birgitta Johansson (S); Bengt Kindbom (C); Anders Nilsson (S); Sven-Gösta Signell (S); Sten Svensson (M); and G. Ivar Virgin (M).

==== 1970s ====
===== 1979 =====
Results of the 1979 general election held on 16 September 1979:

Party		Votes per municipality																Total votes	%	Seats		
Party		Fal- köping	Götene	Gräs- torp	Gulls- pång	Habo	Hjo	Karls- borg	Lid- köping	Marie- stad	Mullsjö	Skara	Skövde	Tibro	Tida- holm	Töre- boda	Vara	Total votes	%	Con.	Lev.	Tot.
Swedish Social Democratic Party	S	7,220	3,105	872	1,876	1,479	2,069	2,552	9,268	6,537	1,127	4,258	11,171	2,776	4,098	2,401	3,496	64,305	36.29%	4	0	4
Centre Party	C	7,218	2,103	1,494	1,297	1,252	1,327	1,336	5,148	3,360	1,055	2,918	6,207	1,663	2,207	2,386	5,817	46,788	26.40%	3	0	3
Moderate Party	M	4,482	1,520	878	733	1,105	1,284	1,036	4,338	3,235	794	2,545	5,753	1,249	1,367	1,263	4,243	35,825	20.22%	2	0	2
Liberal People's Party	FP	2,042	984	405	311	622	512	534	2,698	1,545	458	1,298	3,337	892	690	485	1,471	18,284	10.32%	1	0	1
Left Party – Communists	VPK	659	282	64	135	91	174	119	1,216	573	67	412	1,249	240	292	168	272	6,013	3.39%	0	0	0
Christian Democratic Unity	KDS	550	307	37	79	257	239	120	448	412	270	173	575	244	211	107	199	4,228	2.39%	0	0	0
Communist Party of Sweden	SKP	38	3	0	1	1	4	1	36	67	0	4	62	4	3	0	1	225	0.13%	0	0	0
Workers' Party – The Communists	APK	0	0	1	0	0	0	0	0	7	1	0	10	0	20	0	7	46	0.03%	0	0	0
Other parties		92	53	25	10	8	36	39	228	83	9	239	263	105	120	69	103	1,482	0.84%	0	0	0
Valid votes		22,301	8,357	3,776	4,442	4,815	5,645	5,737	23,380	15,819	3,781	11,847	28,627	7,173	9,008	6,879	15,609	177,196	100.00%	10	0	10
Rejected votes		68	35	10	23	25	17	15	93	71	9	45	119	28	34	26	44	662	0.37%			
Total polled		22,369	8,392	3,786	4,465	4,840	5,662	5,752	23,473	15,890	3,790	11,892	28,746	7,201	9,042	6,905	15,653	177,858	90.77%			
Registered electors		24,440	9,147	4,140	4,974	5,189	6,216	6,220	26,082	17,539	4,069	13,083	32,119	7,929	9,812	7,719	17,263	195,941				
Turnout		91.53%	91.75%	91.45%	89.77%	93.27%	91.09%	92.48%	90.00%	90.60%	93.14%	90.90%	89.50%	90.82%	92.15%	89.45%	90.67%	90.77%				

The following candidates were elected: Gunilla André (C); Jan Fransson (S); Olle Grahn (FP); Ingemar Hallenius (C); Paul Jansson (S); Birgitta Johansson (S); Bengt Kindbom (C); Karl Leuchovius (M); Sven-Gösta Signell (S); and Sten Svensson (M).

===== 1976 =====
Results of the 1976 general election held on 19 September 1976:

Party		Votes per municipality																Total votes	%	Seats		
Party		Fal- köping	Götene	Gräs- torp	Gulls- pång	Habo	Hjo	Karls- borg	Lid- köping	Marie- stad	Mullsjö	Skara	Skövde	Tibro	Tida- holm	Töre- boda	Vara	Total votes	%	Con.	Lev.	Tot.
Swedish Social Democratic Party	S	6,920	2,969	818	1,784	1,235	1,947	2,534	8,948	6,146	915	4,148	10,646	2,600	3,911	2,310	3,244	61,075	34.75%	4	0	4
Centre Party	C	9,193	2,695	1,729	1,664	1,477	1,613	1,788	6,826	4,488	1,274	3,819	8,597	2,348	2,968	2,871	7,037	60,387	34.36%	3	1	4
Moderate Party	M	3,521	1,114	701	565	746	982	729	3,233	2,375	522	1,978	4,119	797	927	1,034	3,517	26,860	15.28%	2	0	2
People's Party	F	2,089	1,003	384	342	612	467	544	2,794	1,725	444	1,335	3,564	857	702	503	1,467	18,832	10.72%	1	0	1
Left Party – Communists	VPK	474	189	43	84	60	107	72	981	434	43	283	903	199	273	124	198	4,467	2.54%	0	0	0
Christian Democratic Unity	KDS	481	264	33	100	213	210	113	374	380	185	149	572	220	206	93	171	3,764	2.14%	0	0	0
Communist Party of Sweden	SKP	33	4	1	4	1	3	7	42	75	0	12	106	10	16	11	6	331	0.19%	0	0	0
Other parties		0	0	1	1	0	0	0	8	1	0	4	2	0	0	0	1	18	0.01%	0	0	0
Valid votes		22,711	8,238	3,710	4,544	4,344	5,329	5,787	23,206	15,624	3,383	11,728	28,509	7,031	9,003	6,946	15,641	175,734	100.00%	10	1	11
Rejected votes		40	8	8	11	7	8	17	48	30	6	38	71	16	22	16	25	371	0.21%			
Total polled		22,751	8,246	3,718	4,555	4,351	5,337	5,804	23,254	15,654	3,389	11,766	28,580	7,047	9,025	6,962	15,666	176,105	91.84%			
Registered electors		24,592	8,986	4,044	5,028	4,648	5,807	6,163	25,633	17,134	3,577	12,751	31,364	7,710	9,670	7,664	16,990	191,761				
Turnout		92.51%	91.76%	91.94%	90.59%	93.61%	91.91%	94.17%	90.72%	91.36%	94.74%	92.28%	91.12%	91.40%	93.33%	90.84%	92.21%	91.84%				

The following candidates were elected: Gunilla André (C); Arne Blomkvist (S); Bengt Börjesson (C); Ingemar Hallenius (C); Paul Jansson (S); Birgitta Johansson (S); Bengt Kindbom (C); Karl Leuchovius (M); Gunnar Richardson (F); Sven-Gösta Signell (S); and Sten Svensson (M).

Permanent substitutions:

- Bengt Börjesson (C) died on 16 August 1977 and was replaced by Anne-Marie Gustafsson (C) in October 1977.

===== 1973 =====
Results of the 1973 general election held on 16 September 1973:

Party		Votes per municipality																Total votes	%	Seats		
Party		Fal- köping	Götene	Gräs- torp	Gulls- pång	Habo	Hjo	Karls- borg	Lid- köping	Marie- stad	Mullsjö	Skara	Skövde	Tibro	Tida- holm	Töre- boda	Vara	Total votes	%	Con.	Lev.	Tot.
Swedish Social Democratic Party	S	6,696	2,843	796	1,717	1,131	1,848	2,538	8,829	5,935	832	4,250	10,093	2,551	3,862	2,243	3,244	59,408	35.65%	4	0	4
Centre Party	C	8,600	2,405	1,660	1,607	1,256	1,382	1,670	6,276	4,227	1,068	3,599	8,094	2,112	2,714	2,593	6,718	55,981	33.59%	3	1	4
Moderate Party	M	3,374	1,084	657	488	543	811	664	2,977	2,175	365	1,806	3,746	639	851	909	3,353	24,442	14.67%	2	0	2
People's Party	F	1,808	865	356	358	441	455	479	2,616	1,469	347	1,130	2,948	758	608	569	1,423	16,630	9.98%	1	0	1
Christian Democratic Unity	KDS	775	398	60	113	294	282	146	472	474	272	187	668	269	261	117	252	5,040	3.02%	0	0	0
Left Party – Communists	VPK	479	214	50	93	55	97	103	1,012	529	46	297	944	208	301	148	228	4,804	2.88%	0	0	0
Communist Party of Sweden	SKP	24	3	0	3	0	4	1	38	74	0	3	54	0	4	0	3	211	0.13%	0	0	0
Communist League Marxist–Leninists (the revolutionaries)	KFML(r)	30	4	0	1	3	0	1	9	6	1	6	43	7	14	2	3	130	0.08%	0	0	0
Other parties		0	1	0	0	0	0	0	2	0	0	2	2	0	1	0	0	8	0.00%	0	0	0
Valid votes		21,786	7,817	3,579	4,380	3,723	4,879	5,602	22,231	14,889	2,931	11,280	26,592	6,544	8,616	6,581	15,224	166,654	100.00%	10	1	11
Rejected votes		11	9	2	9	1	2	13	17	17	0	9	36	8	12	5	15	166	0.10%			
Total polled		21,797	7,826	3,581	4,389	3,724	4,881	5,615	22,248	14,906	2,931	11,289	26,628	6,552	8,628	6,586	15,239	166,820	91.07%			
Registered electors		23,792	8,618	3,910	4,888	4,036	5,348	6,018	24,779	16,481	3,108	12,331	29,385	7,154	9,331	7,360	16,640	183,179				
Turnout		91.61%	90.81%	91.59%	89.79%	92.27%	91.27%	93.30%	89.79%	90.44%	94.31%	91.55%	90.62%	91.59%	92.47%	89.48%	91.58%	91.07%				

The following candidates were elected: Gunilla André (C); Eva Åsbrink (S); Arne Blomkvist (S); Bengt Börjesson (C); Ingemar Hallenius (C); Gunnar Hyltander (F); Paul Jansson (S); Karl Leuchovius (M); Harald Pettersson (C); Sven-Gösta Signell (S); and G. Ivar Virgin (M).

Permanent substitutions:

- Harald Pettersson (C) resigned and was replaced by Bengt Kindbom (C) in January 1975.

===== 1970 =====
Results of the 1970 general election held on 20 September 1970:

Party		Votes	%	Seats		
Party		Votes	%	Con.	Lev.	Tot.
Swedish Social Democratic Party	S	57,686	35.91%	4	0	4
Centre Party	C	47,942	29.84%	3	0	3
People's Party	F	24,964	15.54%	2	0	2
Moderate Party	M	20,775	12.93%	1	1	2
Christian Democratic Unity	KDS	4,513	2.81%	0	0	0
Left Party – Communists	VPK	4,508	2.81%	0	0	0
Communist League Marxists-Leninists	KFML	258	0.16%	0	0	0
Other parties		1	0.00%	0	0	0
Valid votes		160,647	100.00%	10	1	11
Rejected votes		157	0.10%			
Total polled		160,804	88.37%			
Registered electors		181,968				

The following candidates were elected: Eva Åsbrink (S); Arne Blomkvist (S); Bengt Börjesson (C); Gunnar Hyltander (F); Paul Jansson (S); Gunnar Larsson (C); Karl Leuchovius (M); Harald Pettersson (C); Gunnar Richardson (F); Sven-Gösta Signell (S); and G. Ivar Virgin (M).
