= Claussøn =

Claussøn is a Swedish surname. Notable people with the surname include:

- Claudius Claussøn Swart (1388–?), Danish geographer and cartographer
- Ida Ekeroth Clausson (born 1991), Swedish politician
- Niels Claussøn Senning (c. 1580–1617), Danish/Norwegian Lutheran Bishop
- Peder Claussøn Friis (1545–1614), Norwegian clergyman, author, and historian
