= Monica Green =

Monica Green may refer to:

- Monica Green (politician)
- Monica Green (historian)
