= Ekeroth =

Ekeroth is a Swedish surname. Notable people with the surname include:

- Kent Ekeroth (born 1981), Swedish politician and economist
- Ida Ekeroth Clausson (born 1991), Swedish politician
- Anton Ekeroth (born 2001), Swedish footballer
