= Marcus Andersson =

Swedish politician (born 1987)

Member of the Riksdag
- Incumbent
- Assumed office 28 September 2026
- Constituency: Västra Götaland County East

Personal details
- Born: 1987 (age 38–39) Mölndal, Sweden
- Party: Social Democratic Party

Marcus Andreas Andersson (born 1987) is a Swedish politician and Member of the Riksdag. A member of the Social Democratic Party, he has represented Västra Götaland County East since September 2026.

Andersson was born in 1987 in Mölndal. He is a support assistant. He has worked for the Swedish Armed Forces and the municipal council in Skövde Municipality and is a trade union representative.

Andersson was a substitute member of the Riksdag for Erik Ezelius from November 2022 to May 2023 and from February 2025 to November 2025. He was elected to the Riksdag at the 2026 general election.
