= Kjell Nordström =

Kjell Nordström may refer to:

- Kjell Nordström (politician) (born 1949), Swedish politician
- Kjell A. Nordström (born 1958), Swedish economist
