= Charlotte Nordström =

Swedish politician

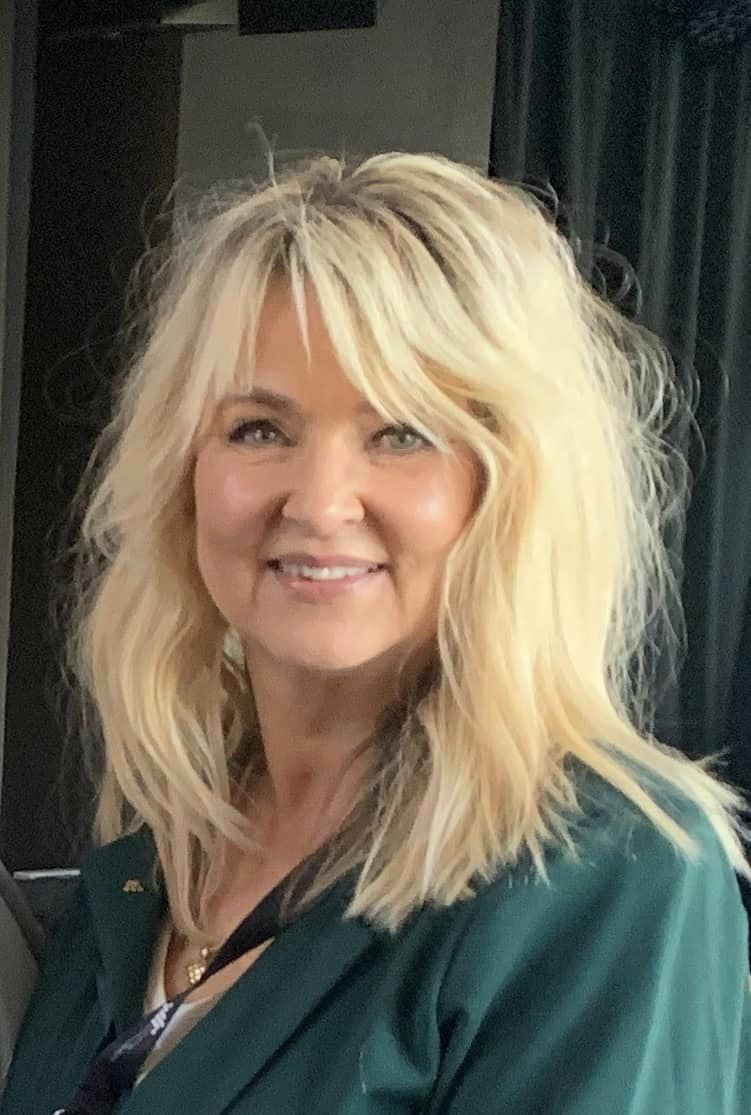
- Charlotte Nordström in 2024

Member of the Riksdag
- Incumbent
- Assumed office 26 September 2022
- Constituency: Västra Götaland County East

Personal details
- Born: 19 November 1963 (age 62) Istrum Parish, Skaraborg County, Sweden
- Party: Moderate Party

Charlotte Astrid Nordström (born 19 November 1963) is a Swedish politician from the Moderate Party. Since 2022, she has been a member of the Riksdag elected for the constituency of Västra Götaland County East. She previously served as a member of the Riksdag from October to November 2006, elected for the Västra Götaland County East constituency.

In the Riksdag, Nordström is a member of the Justice Committee and a substitute member of the Constitutional Committee. She was previously a member of the Committee on Social Insurance in 2006 and a substitute member of the Committee on the Constitution. Nordström resigned as a member of the Riksdag in November 2006 and Sten Bergheden was appointed as the new ordinary member of the Riksdag from 16 November 2006.

From 2006 to 2013, Nordström was the chairman of the municipal board and a municipal councilor in Skara, but chose to resign when the local alliance was dissolved after the People's Party voted for the opposition's budget in the summer of 2013. This was after disagreements arose regarding decisions regarding investments in school buildings. She was also chairman of the municipal consultation group in the Moderate Party.

Nordström was the chairwoman of the Västra Götaland Police Board from 2007 to 2014. She then became a member of the Transparency Council, Police Region West.

Since 2016, Nordström has been CEO of Nordströms AB. After the 2018 election, she became a regional councilor substitute in the Västra Götaland region and chair of the region's Committee for Public Health and Social Sustainability. Since 2020, Charlotte Nordström has been a substitute in the European Committee of the Regions and from 2019-2023 she was a member of the board of the First AP_fonden. Nordström received a period of adjustment grant.
