= Margareta Larsson =

Swedish politician

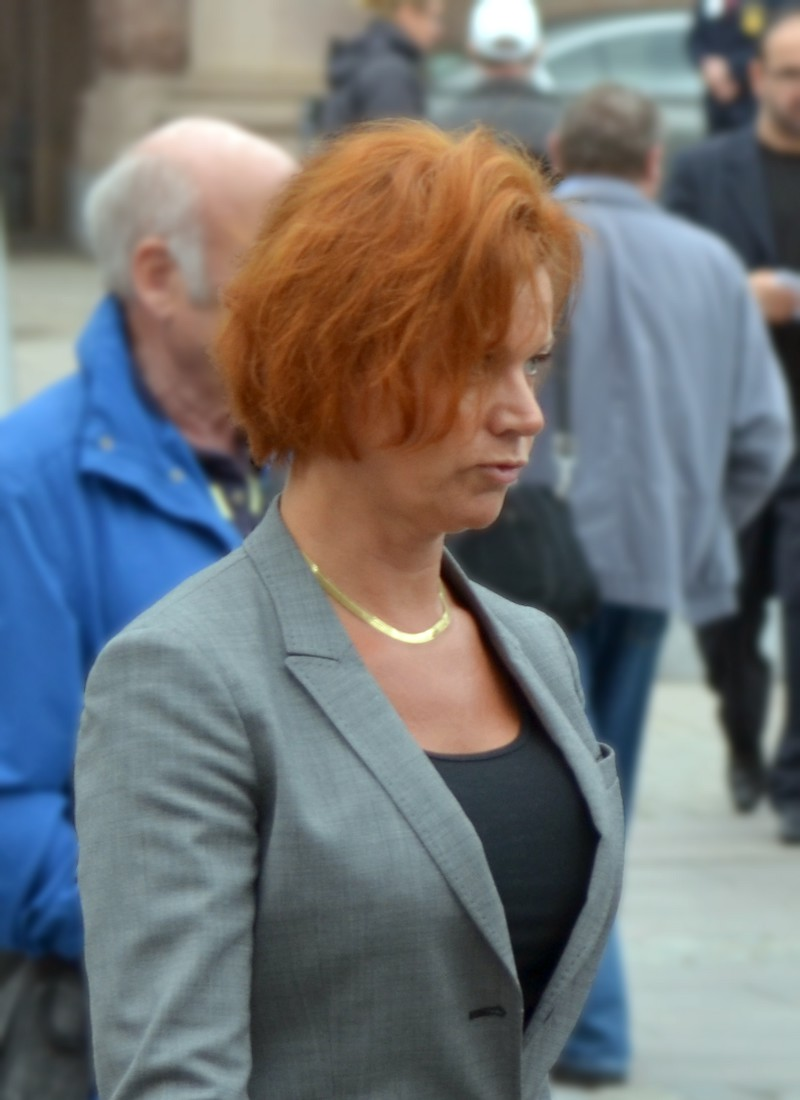
- Margareta Larsson (since 2018 Gunsdotter) in 2012.

Member of the Riksdag
- In office 2010–2018
- Constituency: Västra Götaland County East

Personal details
- Born: 18 July 1964 (age 61) Gävleborg, Sweden
- Party: Sweden Democrats (2004–2015)

Margareta Birgitta Larsson (née Lindberg; born 18 July 1964) is a Swedish politician and MP who was a member of the Riksdagen from 2010 to 2018 and took seat 271.

== Biography ==
Larsson was born Margareta Lindberg in 1964. She trained as a mental health worker focusing on alcohol and drug treatment before becoming the owner of a massage parlor.

Larsson joined the Sweden Democrats in 2004 and was elected as an MP for the party at the 2010 general elections and again in the 2014 general elections. On 30 September 2015, Larsson announced that she had left the party citing her disagreements with its leadership and complaining that the Sweden Democrats had become "too politically correct." At the same time she had also come under criticism for alleged financial irregularities. She insisted she would continue her work in the Riksdag as an independent and formed an independent faction with fellow former SD MP Pavel Gamov. She did not run for reelection in 2018 and left politics after.

Larsson was between 2006 and 2010 the chairman of Gävle city council. Her daughter Louise Erixon was the fiancé of the Sweden Democrat party leader Jimmie Åkesson.
