= Per Rosengren =

Swedish politician and teacher

Per Rosengren (born 1951) is a Swedish Left Party politician and teacher, and a member of the Riksdag from 1994–2006. He represented the constituency of Västra Götaland County East. He is currently a member of the National Audit Board.
