= Erik Ezelius =

Swedish politician (born 1986)

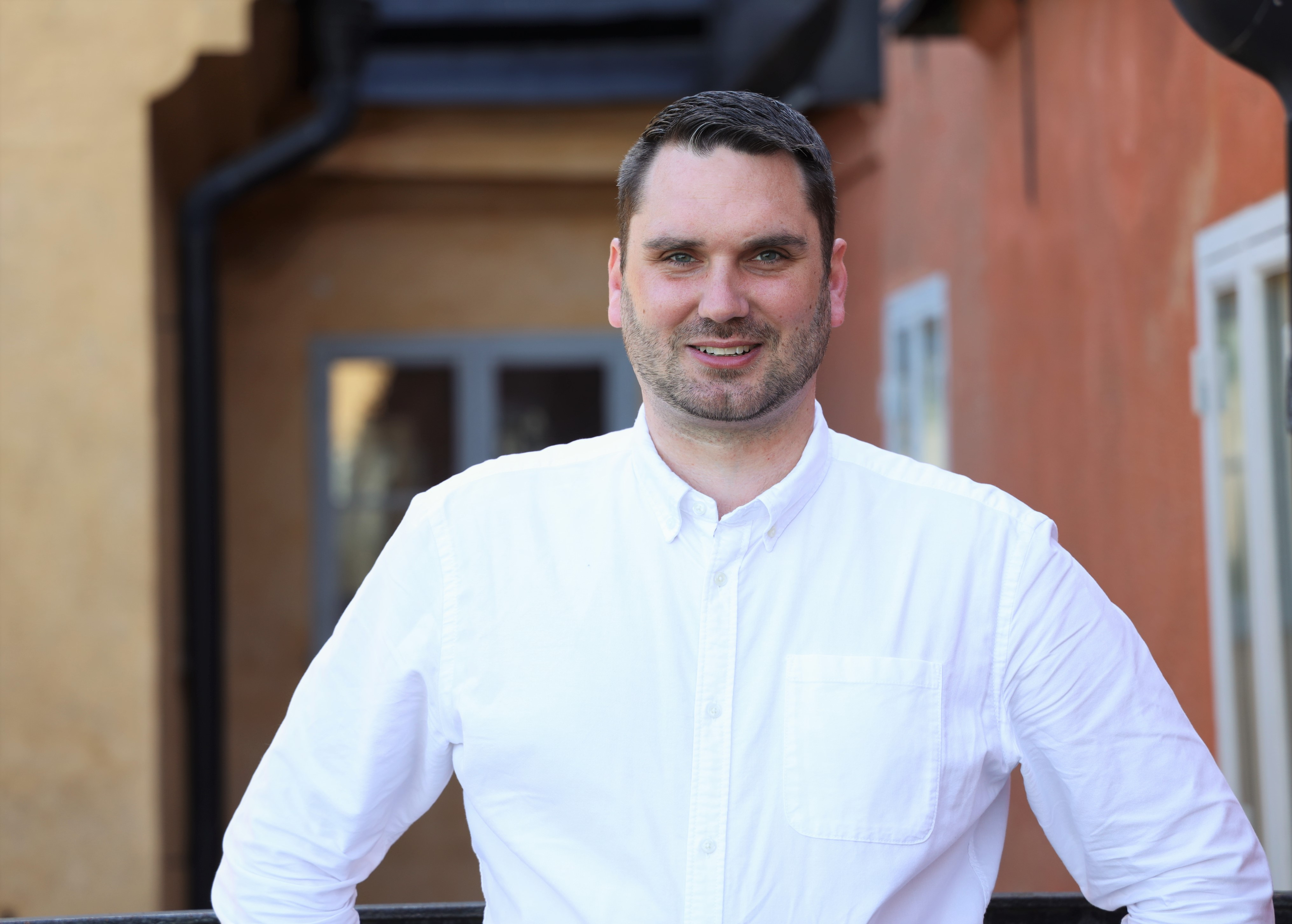
- Ezelius in 2014

Member of the Riksdag
- Incumbent
- Assumed office 24 September 2018
- Constituency: Västra Götaland County East

Personal details
- Born: John Erik Ezelius; 1986 (age 39–40)
- Party: Social Democratic Party
- Education: Swedish Defence University

Military service
- Allegiance: Sweden
- Branch/service: Swedish Army
- Years of service: 2012–
- Unit: Skaraborg Regiment

John Erik Ezelius (born 1986) is a Swedish politician, army officer and member of the Riksdag, the national legislature. A member of the Social Democratic Party, he has represented Västra Götaland County East since September 2018. He had previously been a substitute member of the Riksdag for Urban Ahlin twice: September 2014 to October 2015; and January 2016 to September 2018.

Ezelius is the son of project manager Peter Ezelius and nurse Lena Ezelius (née Karlsson). He was educated in Tidaholm and worked as substitute teacher and appliance salesman. He has a military officer degree from the Swedish Defence University and has been a platoon leader in the Skaraborg Regiment since 2012. He has been a member of the municipal council in Tidaholm Municipality since 2006.
