= Ulrika Heie =

Swedish politician (born 1965)

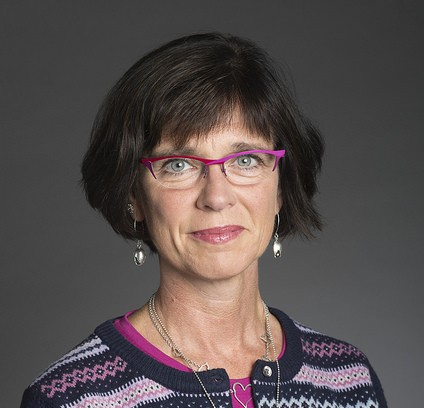
Ulrika Carlsson.

Ulrika Carlsson (born 17 April 1965) is a Swedish Centre Party politician. She has been a member of the Riksdag since 2006 and is elected from the constituency of Västra Götaland County East.

Ulrika is the Swedish Centre Party's spokesperson at educational affairs and is a former teacher herself. Between 2006 and 2010 she was a member of the parliamentary committee on education, and substitute in the committee of foreign affairs. Today she's sitting in the education committee as well as being substitute in both the foreign affairs committee and the Executive Board of Parliament. She's also a member of the War Delegation.

Ulrika is also the deputy house leader for the party, in the Riksdag.

In the Riksdag debates, she's called Ulrika Carlsson från Skövde (Ulrika Carlsson from Skövde) because of the other parliamentarian Ulrika Karlsson, from the Moderate Party, who shares the same name.

Party political offices
Preceded by Ulrika Liljeberg	Second Deputy Leader of the Centre Party; 2025–	Incumbent
