= Dan Hovskär =

Swedish politician (born 1970)

Member of the Riksdag
- Incumbent
- Assumed office 2022
- Constituency: Västra Götaland County East

Personal details
- Born: 4 March 1970 (age 56) Sweden
- Party: Christian Democrats

Dan Tore Hovskär (born 4 March 1970) is a Swedish politician from the Christian Democrats. He has been a member of the Riksdag (Deputy Minister of State) since 18 October 2022 for the Västra Götaland County East constituency.

Hovskär ran in the 2022 Swedish general election and became a substitute. He has been serving as a substitute for Ebba Busch since 18 October 2022. In the Riksdag, he is a deputy member of the Committee on Civil Affairs, the Committee on Environment and Agriculture, the Committee on Industry and Trade, the Committee on Health and Welfare, the Committee on Transport and Communications and the Committee on Education.

== See also ==
- List of members of the Riksdag, 2022–2026
- List of members of the Riksdag, 2026–2030
