= Therese Kristiansson =

Swedish politician (born 1995)

Member of the Riksdag
- Incumbent
- Assumed office 28 September 2026
- Constituency: Västra Götaland County East

Personal details
- Born: 16 July 1995 (age 31)
- Party: Social Democratic Party

Therese Anna Maria Kristiansson (born 16 July 1995) is a Swedish politician who was elected member of the Riksdag in 2026. She is an ombudsman of the Social Democratic Party in Skaraborg.
