= National apportionment of MP seats in the Riksdag =

Electoral system of Sweden

The electoral system in Sweden is proportional. Of the 349 seats in the national diet, the unicameral Riksdag, 310 are fixed constituency seats (Swedish: valkretsmandat) allocated to constituencies in relation to the number of people entitled to vote in each constituency (valkrets). The remaining 39 leveling seats (utjämningsmandat) are used to correct the deviations from proportional national distribution that may arise when allocating the fixed constituency seats. There is a constraint in the system that means that only a party that has received at least four per cent of the votes in the whole country participates in the distribution of seats. However, a party that has received at least twelve per cent of the votes in a constituency participates in the distribution of the fixed constituency seats in that constituency.

== Apportionment of fixed constituency seats ==
| Constituency | 1970 | 1973 | 1976 | 1979 | 1982 | 1985 | 1988 | 1991 | 1994 | 1998 | 2002 | 2006 | 2010 | 2014 | 2018 | 2022 |
|---|---|---|---|---|---|---|---|---|---|---|---|---|---|---|---|---|
| Stockholm Municipality | 31 | 29 | 27 | 26 | 26 | 25 | 25 | 25 | 25 | 26 | 27 | 27 | 28 | 29 | 29 | 29 |
| Stockholm County | 24 | 27 | 28 | 29 | 30 | 31 | 32 | 32 | 33 | 34 | 35 | 36 | 37 | 38 | 39 | 40 |
| Uppsala County | 8 | 8 | 9 | 9 | 9 | 9 | 9 | 9 | 10 | 10 | 10 | 11 | 11 | 11 | 11 | 12 |
| Södermanland County | 9 | 9 | 9 | 9 | 9 | 9 | 9 | 9 | 9 | 9 | 9 | 9 | 9 | 9 | 9 | 9 |
| Östergötland County | 15 | 15 | 15 | 15 | 15 | 15 | 15 | 15 | 15 | 15 | 15 | 14 | 14 | 14 | 14 | 14 |
| Jönköping County | 12 | 11 | 11 | 11 | 11 | 11 | 11 | 11 | 11 | 12 | 11 | 11 | 11 | 11 | 11 | 11 |
| Kronoberg County | 6 | 6 | 6 | 6 | 7 | 6 | 6 | 6 | 6 | 6 | 6 | 6 | 6 | 6 | 6 | 6 |
| Kalmar County | 10 | 9 | 9 | 9 | 9 | 9 | 9 | 9 | 9 | 9 | 8 | 8 | 8 | 8 | 8 | 8 |
| Gotland County | 2 | 2 | 2 | 2 | 2 | 2 | 2 | 2 | 2 | 2 | 2 | 2 | 2 | 2 | 2 | 2 |
| Blekinge County | 6 | 6 | 6 | 6 | 6 | 6 | 6 | 6 | 6 | 6 | 5 | 5 | 5 | 5 | 5 | 5 |
| Kristianstad County | 10 | 10 | 10 | 11 | 11 | 11 | 11 | 11 | 11 | - | - | - | - | - | - | - |
| Fyrstadskretsen | 18 | 18 | 18 | 17 | 17 | 17 | 17 | 17 | - | - | - | - | - | - | - | - |
| Malmöhus County | 10 | 10 | 10 | 11 | 11 | 11 | 11 | 11 | - | - | - | - | - | - | - | - |
| Malmöhus County North | - | - | - | - | - | - | - | - | 9 | - | - | - | - | - | - | - |
| Malmöhus County South | - | - | - | - | - | - | - | - | 11 | - | - | - | - | - | - | - |
| Malmö Municipality | - | - | - | - | - | - | - | - | 8 | 9 | 9 | 9 | 9 | 10 | 10 | 10 |
| Skåne County Western | - | - | - | - | - | - | - | - | - | 9 | 9 | 9 | 9 | 9 | 9 | 9 |
| Skåne County Southern | - | - | - | - | - | - | - | - | - | 11 | 11 | 11 | 12 | 12 | 12 | 12 |
| Skåne County Northern and Eastern | - | - | - | - | - | - | - | - | - | 10 | 10 | 10 | 10 | 10 | 10 | 10 |
| Halland County | 7 | 8 | 8 | 9 | 9 | 9 | 9 | 9 | 9 | 10 | 10 | 10 | 10 | 10 | 10 | 10 |
| Gothenburg Municipality | 17 | 17 | 17 | 17 | 16 | 16 | 16 | 16 | 15 | 16 | 17 | 17 | 17 | 17 | 17 | 17 |
| Bohus County | 10 | 10 | 10 | 10 | 10 | 11 | 11 | 11 | 11 | - | - | - | - | - | - | - |
| Älvsborg County North | 9 | 9 | 9 | 9 | 9 | 9 | 9 | 9 | 9 | - | - | - | - | - | - | - |
| Älvsborg County South | 7 | 7 | 7 | 7 | 7 | 7 | 6 | 7 | 6 | - | - | - | - | - | - | - |
| Skaraborg County | 10 | 10 | 10 | 10 | 10 | 10 | 10 | 10 | 10 | - | - | - | - | - | - | - |
| Västra Götaland County West | - | - | - | - | - | - | - | - | - | 11 | 11 | 11 | 12 | 12 | 11 | 11 |
| Västra Götaland County North | - | - | - | - | - | - | - | - | - | 9 | 9 | 9 | 9 | 9 | 8 | 8 |
| Västra Götaland County South | - | - | - | - | - | - | - | - | - | 6 | 6 | 6 | 6 | 6 | 7 | 7 |
| Västra Götaland County East | - | - | - | - | - | - | - | - | - | 9 | 9 | 9 | 9 | 9 | 9 | 8 |
| Värmland County | 11 | 11 | 11 | 11 | 11 | 11 | 11 | 10 | 10 | 10 | 10 | 10 | 9 | 9 | 9 | 9 |
| Örebro County | 11 | 11 | 11 | 11 | 10 | 10 | 10 | 10 | 10 | 10 | 10 | 10 | 9 | 9 | 9 | 9 |
| Västmanland County | 9 | 9 | 9 | 9 | 9 | 9 | 9 | 9 | 9 | 9 | 9 | 8 | 8 | 8 | 8 | 8 |
| Dalarna County | 11 | 11 | 11 | 11 | 11 | 11 | 11 | 11 | 11 | 10 | 10 | 10 | 10 | 9 | 9 | 9 |
| Gävleborg County | 12 | 12 | 12 | 11 | 11 | 11 | 11 | 11 | 11 | 10 | 10 | 10 | 10 | 9 | 9 | 9 |
| Västernorrland County | 11 | 11 | 11 | 10 | 10 | 10 | 10 | 10 | 10 | 9 | 9 | 9 | 8 | 8 | 8 | 8 |
| Jämtland County | 5 | 5 | 5 | 5 | 5 | 5 | 5 | 5 | 5 | 5 | 5 | 5 | 4 | 4 | 4 | 4 |
| Västerbotten County | 9 | 9 | 9 | 9 | 9 | 9 | 9 | 9 | 9 | 9 | 9 | 9 | 9 | 9 | 9 | 8 |
| Norrbotten County | 10 | 10 | 10 | 10 | 10 | 10 | 10 | 10 | 10 | 9 | 9 | 9 | 9 | 8 | 8 | 8 |
| Total fixed constituency seats | 310 | 310 | 310 | 310 | 310 | 310 | 310 | 310 | 310 | 310 | 310 | 310 | 310 | 310 | 310 | 310 |
