= Patrik Björck =

Swedish politician (born 1957)

Member of the Riksdag
- Incumbent
- Assumed office 2 October 2006
- Constituency: Västra Götaland County East

Personal details
- Born: Patrik Björck; 1957 (age 68–69) Gothenburg
- Party: Social Democratic Party

Patrik Björck (born 1957) is a Swedish politician, trade unionist and member of the Riksdag, the national legislature. A member of the Social Democratic Party, he has represented Västra Götaland County East since October 2006.

Björck was born and educated in Gothenburg. He is the son of architect Folke Björck and sociologist Helena Björck (née Nolin). He has held various jobs including food worker, brewery worker, tram driver, nursing assistant and wood worker. He has held various roles at the GS trade union. He has been a member of the municipal council in Falköping Municipality since 1998.

Björck lives in Solberga near Åsarp. He is married and has five children and three grandchildren.
