= Carina Ohlsson =

Swedish politician (born 1957)

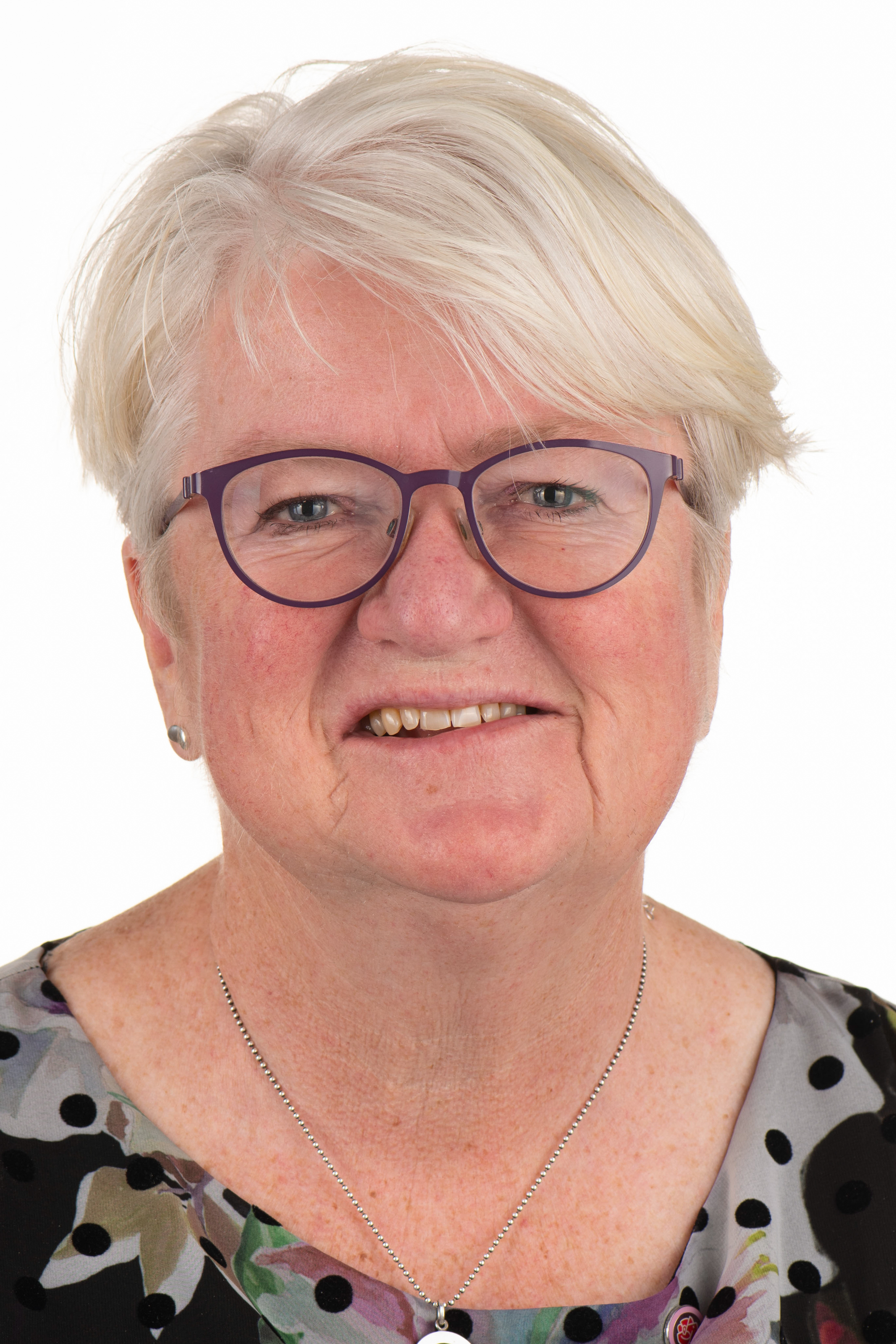

Member of the European Parliament
- Incumbent
- Assumed office 26 September 2022
- Preceded by: Jytte Guteland

Alderman of the House
- In office 26 September 2022 – 26 September 2022
- Preceded by: Tuve Skånberg
- Succeeded by: Karin Enström

Member of the Riksdag
- In office 5 October 1998 – 26 September 2022
- Constituency: Västra Götaland County East

Personal details
- Born: 14 June 1957 (age 68) Lidköping, Sweden
- Party: Social Democrats

Carina Gunilla Ohlsson (born 14 June 1957) is a Swedish social democratic politician who served as member of the Riksdag from 1998 to 2022. She is Member of the European Parliament since 2022 following Jytte Gutelands resignation.

She was chairperson of the Social Democratic Women in Sweden from 2013 to 2021.

Political offices
Preceded by Tuve Skånberg	President by age 2022	Succeeded by Karin Enström
