= Christer Winbäck =

Swedish politician (born 1953)

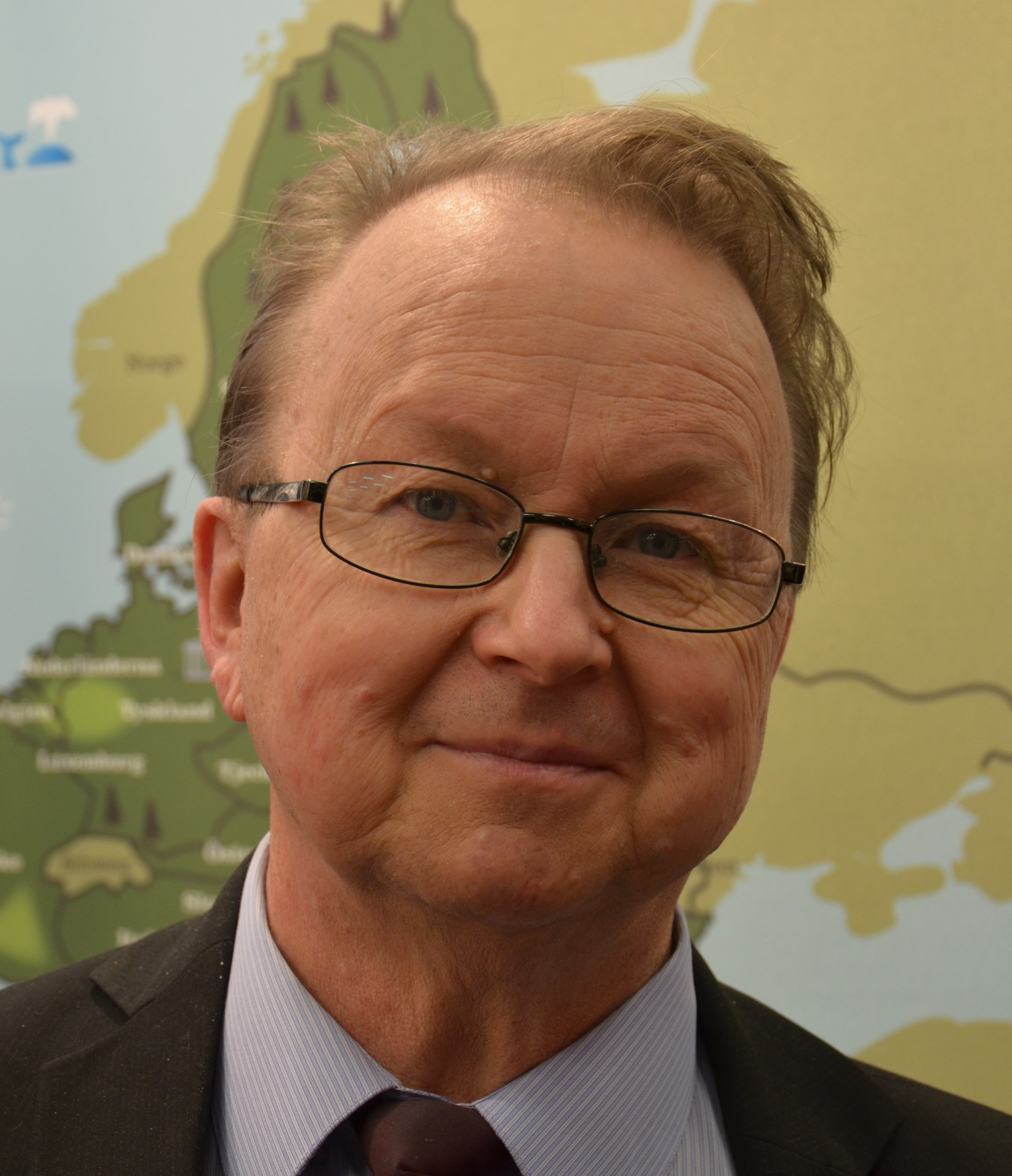

Christer Winbäck

Christer Winbäck (born 1953) is a Swedish Liberal People's Party politician, member of the Riksdag since 2002.
