= Holger Gustafsson =

Swedish politician (born 1946)

Holger Gustafsson (born 1946) is a Swedish Christian Democratic politician, member of the Riksdag since 1991.

He finished training as a Construction engineer in 1970 and earned a degree in business administration with a major in marketing in 1973.

== Current posts ==
- Member, the Parliament of Sweden
- Member, the Swedish Parliament Committee on Foreign Affairs
- Member, the Swedish Parliament Committee on Finance
- Delegate, the Inter-Parliamentary Union
- Swedish International Development Cooperation Agency, Sida
- Member of the board and the executive committee of the Christian Democratic Party Skaraborg County section

== Previous posts ==
- Member of the European Parliament
- Member of the Swedish Parliament Committee on Taxation
- Member of the Swedish Organization for Security and Co-operation in Europe delegation
- Deputy Chairman of the Swedish Parliament Committee on Civil Law
- Member of Swedish Parliament EEA Committee and the EC delegation
- Member of the Swedish Parliament Committee on the Environment and Agriculture
- The Speakers' Conference (Talmanskonferensen)
- Chairman of the Swedish Post and Telecom Authority
- The Commission on the Courts
- The Reference Group for Swedish Agriculture
- The Municipal Council and the Education Board
- The County Council Executive Committee
- Skaraborg County Administrative Board
- The Federation of Swedish Industries’ Committee on the Business Sector
- Christian Democratic Party Executive, and the board of the parliamentary party
- Chairman of the Christian Democrats in Skaraborg County
- The Christian Democratic Party's EU group
- Skaraborg County Council
- Skaraborg County Council Hospital Board
- Västra Götaland County Administrative Board
- The Council of Europe for Human Rights
- Christian Democrats party group in Skaraborg County Council
- Västra Götaland Regional Development Board
- Gothenburg Tax Authority, board member
- Chairman of the Christian Democratic Party's regional executive committee in Västra Götaland
