= Bengt Rosén =

Swedish politician

Bengt Rosén (7 February 1936 – 3 May 2017) was a Swedish politician who served in the Riksdag from 1985 to 1994.

His father Erik Rosén i Götene had also served on the Riksdag. The younger Rosén was born and educated in Götene. He then moved to Skara, then studied law at Lund University. Rosén became a judge in 1963, but left his legal career to run Rosén & Söner, a company owned by his family. Rosén left the business upon his election to the Riksdag. He was reelected twice thereafter in 1988 and 1991. While a member of the Riksdag, Rosén was active in discussions of agriculture and national defense. Outside of politics, Rosén was active in Christian organizations and served as the chairman of Götene IF football club.
