= Lars Elinderson =

Swedish politician

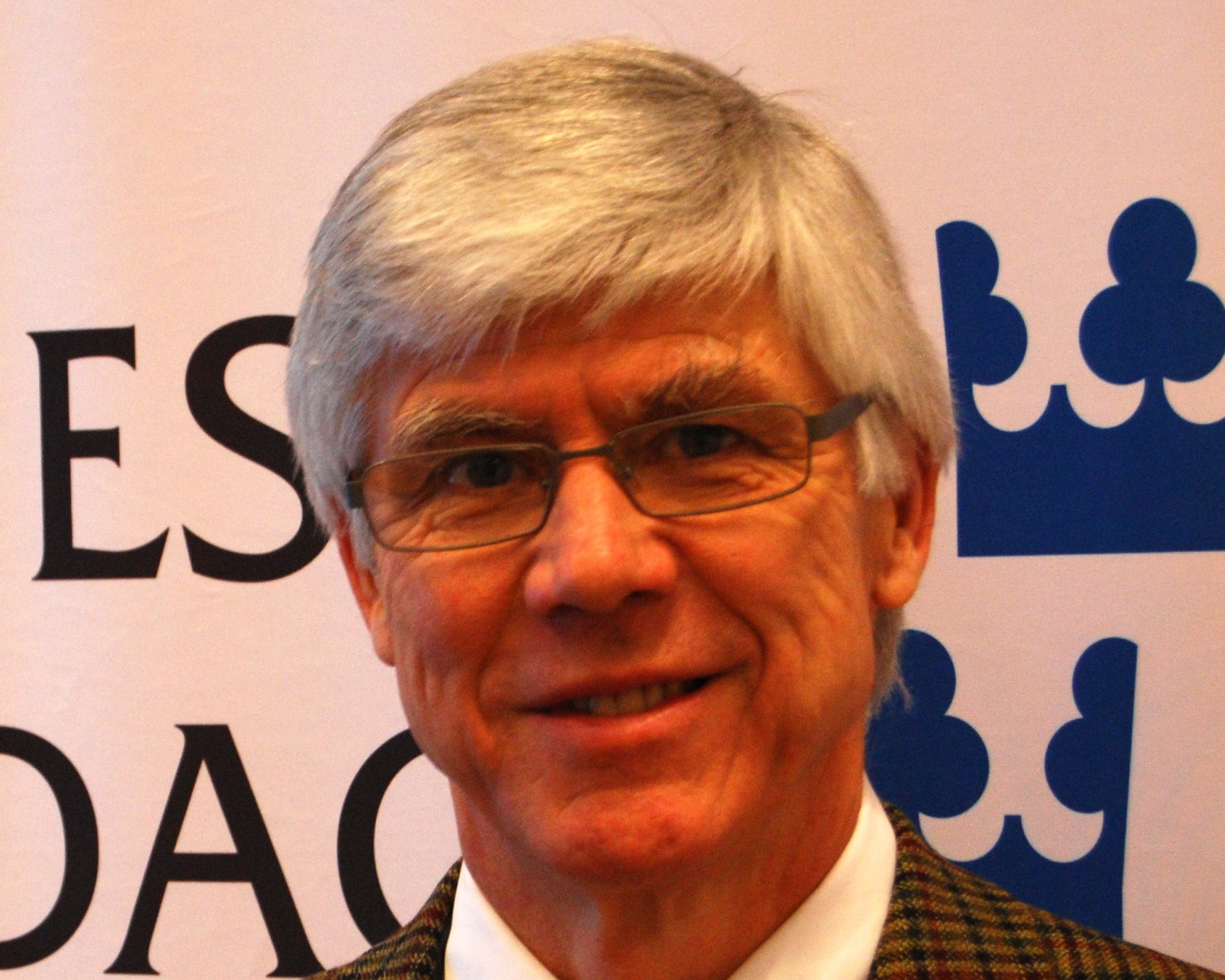
Elinderson in 2008

Lars Elinderson (4 May 1949 – 30 January 2026) was a Swedish politician of the Moderate Party. He was a member of the Riksdag (Parliament) in 1998–2002, and 2006–2014. He also served as a replacement member of the Riksdag in 2004. Before serving in the Parliament, Elinderson was a County Council Commissioner in Skaraborg County Council 1982-1991 and the Mayor of Falköping municipality from 1991 to 1998. Elinderson was an economist by profession, and held master's degrees in Finance and Economic history.
