= Kjell Nordström (politician) =

Swedish politician (born 1949)

Member of the Riksdag
- In office 18 April 1994 – 2 October 2006
- Preceded by: Jan Fransson
- Constituency: Västra Götaland County East

Member of the Riksdag
- In office 30 September 1985 – 30 September 1991
- Constituency: Skaraborg County

Personal details
- Born: 1949 (age 76–77)
- Party: Social Democratic Party

Kjell Arne Evald Nordström (born 1949) is a Swedish politician and former member of the Riksdag, the national legislature. A member of the Social Democratic Party, he represented Skaraborg County between September 1985 and September 1991 and Västra Götaland County East between April 1994 and October 2006.
