= Cecilia Widegren =

Swedish politician

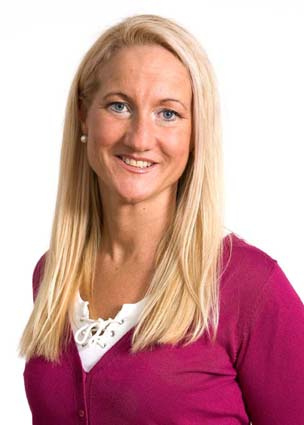

Member of the Riksdag
- In office 2002–2022

Personal details
- Party: Moderate Party
- Relations: John Widegren (cousin)

Cecilia Widegren (born 1973) is a Swedish politician of the Moderate Party. She was a member of the Riksdag from 2002 to 2022.
