= Hjo Municipality =

Hjo Municipality Hjo kommun
- Municipality
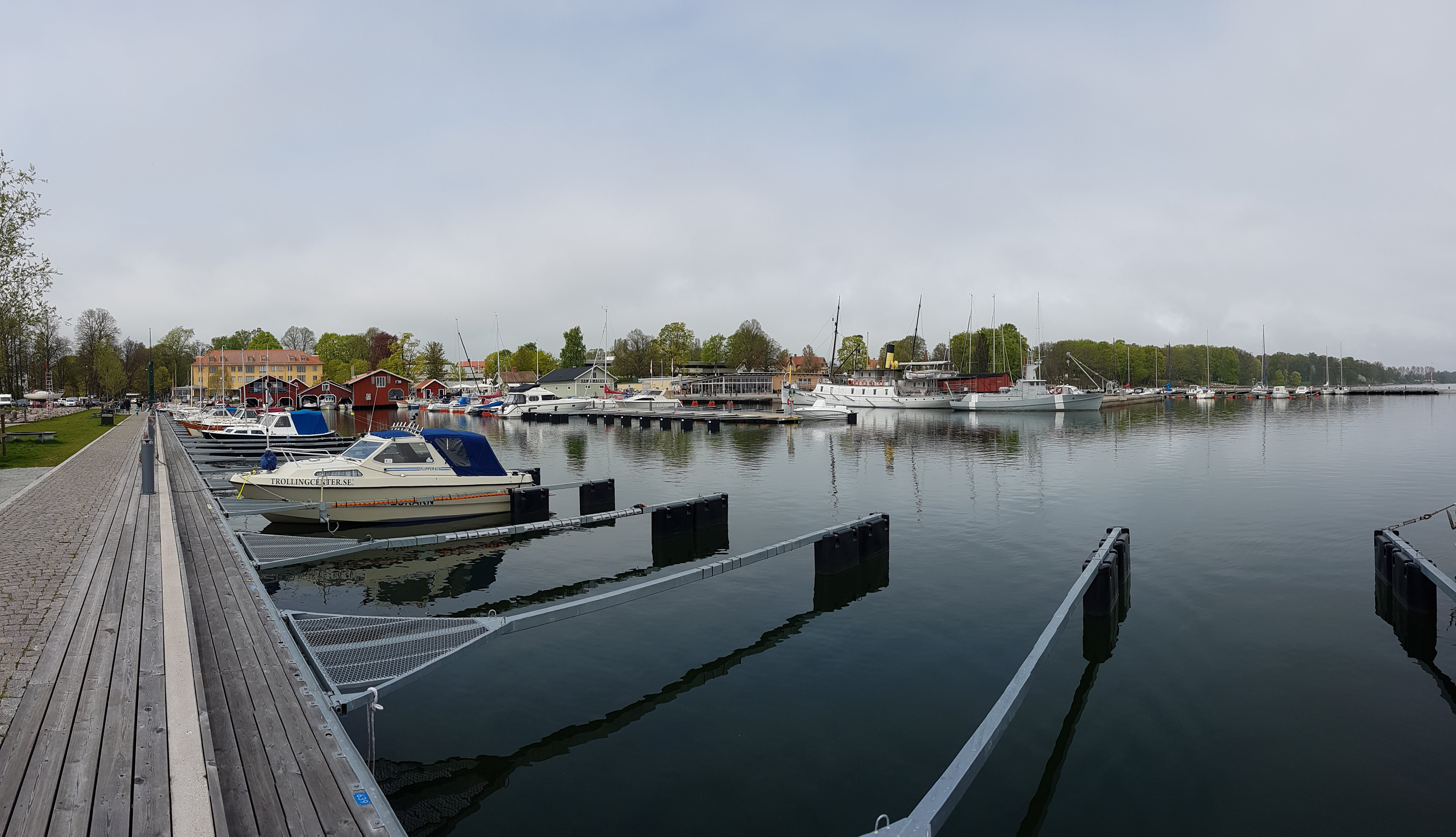

- Coat of arms

- Coordinates: 58°18′N 14°17′E
- Country: Sweden
- County: Västra Götaland County
- Seat: Hjo

Area
  - Total: 584.47 km^{2} (225.67 sq mi)
  - Land: 297.04 km^{2} (114.69 sq mi)
  - Water: 287.43 km^{2} (110.98 sq mi)
- Area as of 1 January 2014.

Population (30 June 2025)
  - Total: 9,334
  - Density: 31.42/km^{2} (81.39/sq mi)
- Time zone: UTC+1 (CET)
  - Summer (DST): UTC+2 (CEST)
- ISO 3166 code: SE
- Province: Västergötland
- Municipal code: 1497
- Website: www.hjo.se

Hjo Municipality (Swedish: Hjo kommun) is a municipality in Västra Götaland County in western Sweden. Its seat is located in the city of Hjo.

The municipality was created in 1971, when the City of Hjo was amalgamated with a part of the rural municipality Värsås. In 1974 parts of Fröjered and Fågelås were added.

== Geography ==
Geographically it is situated by the western shore of Lake Vättern. The large and fish-rich waters have been the main influence on the industry. The largest rivulet intersecting the municipality from Vättern is the Hjo River. Parts of it have been made a nature reserve. Partly this is due to the salmon (Salmo trutta) and the grayling (Thymallus thymallus) that occur natural in the rivulet, but have had hard times due to dams.

== Demographics ==
This is a demographic table based on Hjo Municipality's electoral districts in the 2022 Swedish general election sourced from SVT's election platform, in turn taken from SCB official statistics.

In total there were 9,227 residents, including 7,214 Swedish citizens of voting age. 44.6% voted for the left coalition and 54.2% for the right coalition. Indicators are in percentage points except population totals and income.

Location	Residents	Citizen adults	Left vote	Right vote	Employed	Swedish parents	Foreign heritage	Income SEK	Degree
Location			%	%					
Hjo M	1,717	1,305	50.9	48.0	75	85	15	22,491	33
Hjo N	1,767	1,480	46.7	52.3	79	90	10	21,812	30
Hjo S	2,104	1,615	45.7	53.7	82	89	11	26,975	40
Hjo V	1,879	1,463	42.8	56.1	85	91	9	25,980	37
Korsberga	899	691	40.4	57.0	85	93	7	26,079	30
N/S Fågelås	861	660	34.6	63.3	88	91	9	24,453	35
Source: SVT
