= Ida Ekeroth Clausson =

Swedish politician (born 1991)

Member of the Riksdag
- Incumbent
- Assumed office 26 September 2022
- Preceded by: Carina Ohlsson
- Constituency: Västra Götaland County East

Personal details
- Born: 1991 (age 34–35)
- Party: Social Democratic Party

Ida Ella Marie Ekeroth Clausson (born 1991) is a Swedish politician and member of the Riksdag, the national legislature. A member of the Social Democratic Party, she has represented Västra Götaland County East since September 2022. She had previously been a substitute member of the Riksdag for Urban Ahlin between from October to December 2015.
