= Sten Bergheden =

Swedish politician (born 1965)

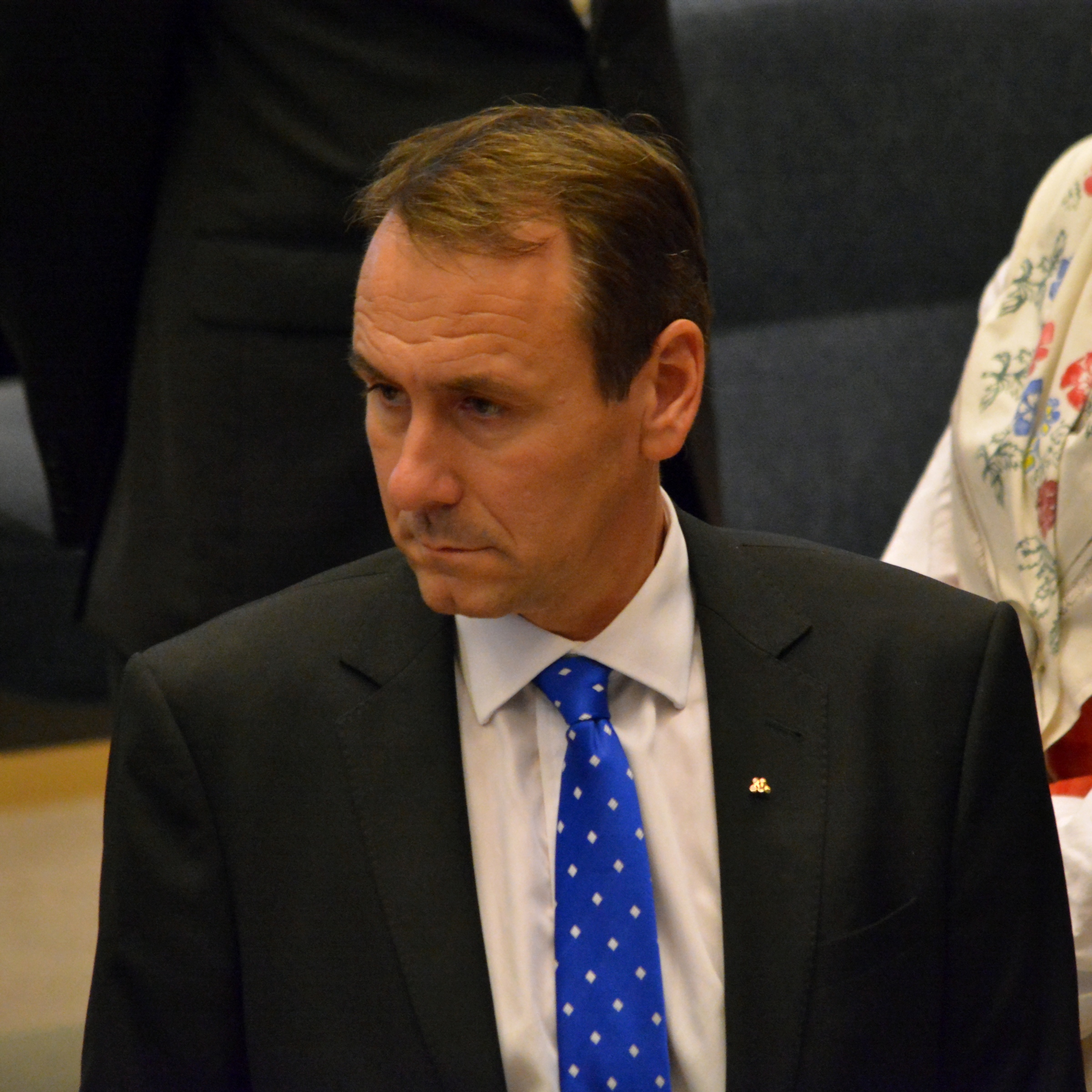

Member of the Riksdag
- Incumbent
- Assumed office 2006
- Preceded by: Charlotte Nordström

Personal details
- Born: 24 April 1965 (age 61)
- Party: Moderate Party

Sten Bergheden (born 124 April 965) is a Swedish politician of the Moderate Party. He has been a member of the Riksdag since 2006.
