= Bengt Börjesson =

Swedish politician (1920–1977)

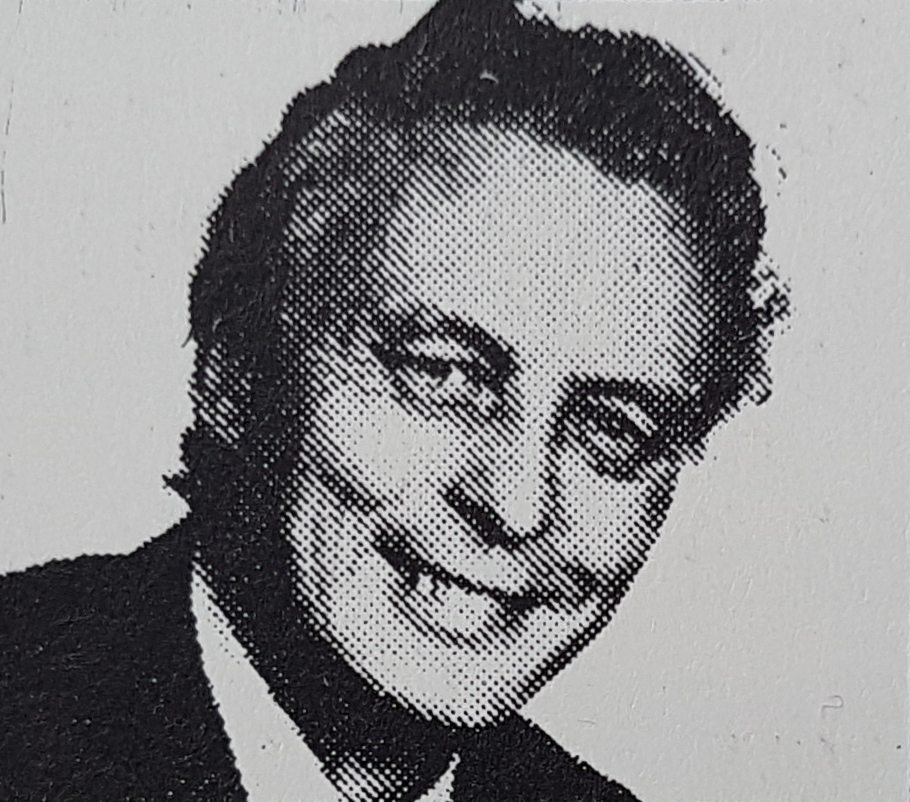
Bengt Börjesson

Bengt Börjesson (May 1, 1920 – August 16, 1977) was a Swedish politician. He was a member of the Centre Party. He was a member of the Parliament of Sweden (lower chamber) 1961–1970 for Skaraborg County, and of the unicameral parliament 1971–1976/7. He married Lisa Birgitta Karlsson in 1969, with whom he had two children.
