= Birgitta Carlsson =

Swedish politician (born 1943)

Birgitta Carlsson (born 3 February 1943) is a Swedish Centre Party politician. She was a member of the Riksdag from 1991 until 2006.
