= Tidaholm Municipality =

Tidaholm Municipality Tidaholms kommun
- Municipality
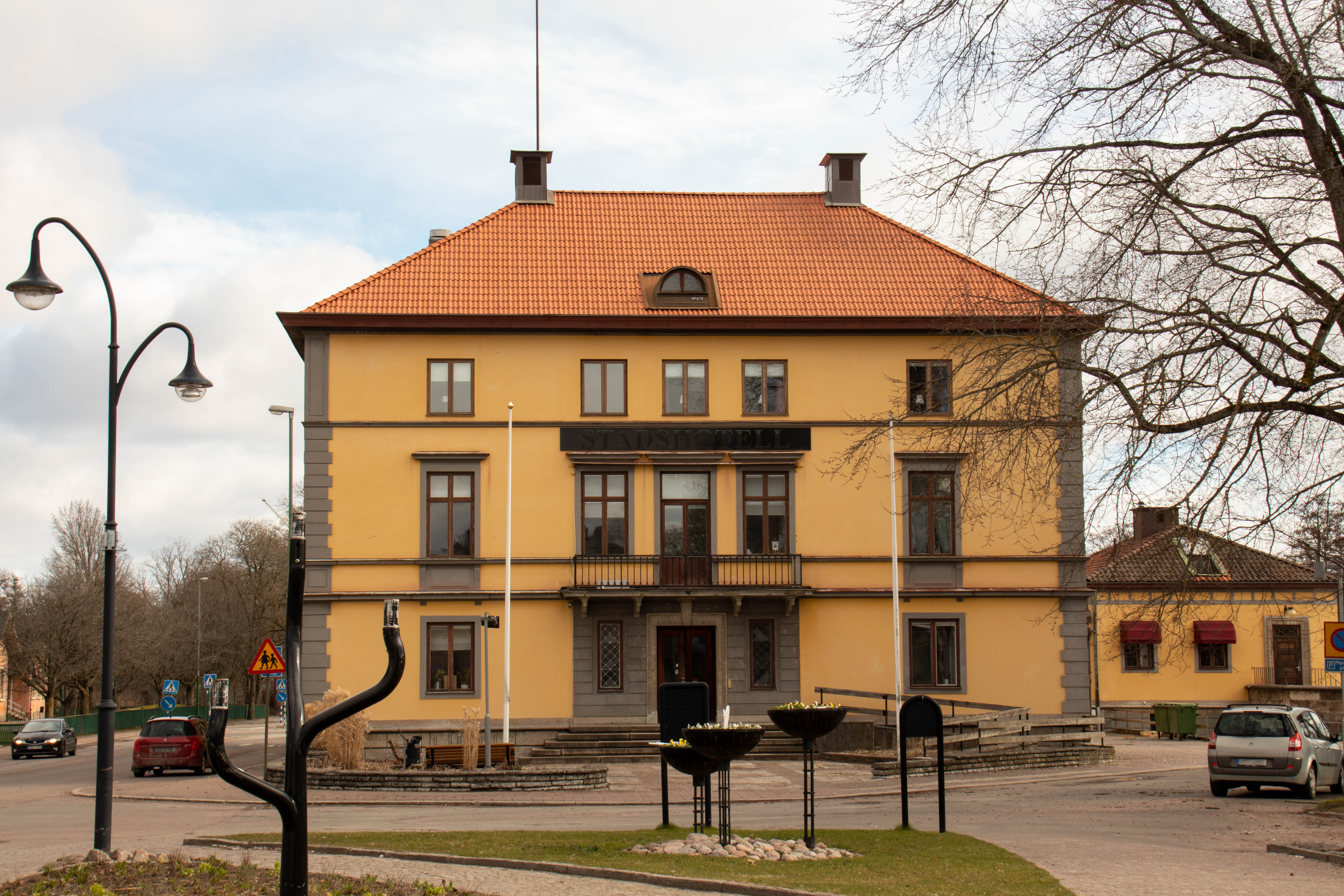
- Tidaholm town hall

- Coat of arms

- Coordinates: 58°11′N 13°57′E
- Country: Sweden
- County: Västra Götaland County
- Seat: Tidaholm

Area
  - Total: 522.95 km^{2} (201.91 sq mi)
  - Land: 518.06 km^{2} (200.02 sq mi)
  - Water: 4.89 km^{2} (1.89 sq mi)
- Area as of 1 January 2014.

Population (30 June 2025)
  - Total: 12,744
  - Density: 24.599/km^{2} (63.712/sq mi)
- Time zone: UTC+1 (CET)
  - Summer (DST): UTC+2 (CEST)
- ISO 3166 code: SE
- Province: Västergötland
- Municipal code: 1498
- Website: www.tidaholm.se

Tidaholm Municipality (Swedish: Tidaholms kommun) is a municipality in Västra Götaland County in western Sweden. Its seat is located in the city of Tidaholm.

The municipality is located on the banks of the river Tidan.

In the early 1970s a nationwide local government reform was carried out in Sweden. Urban and rural areas were merged into larger unitary municipalities. The former City of Tidaholm (instituted in 1910) was in 1974 amalgamated with the surrounding rural municipality Hökensås and parts of Dimbo and Fröjered. The number of original entities (as of 1863) within the present municipality is 20.

Many well-preserved medieval churches stand in the municipality. Some church sites also contain examples of early Scandinavian runestones.

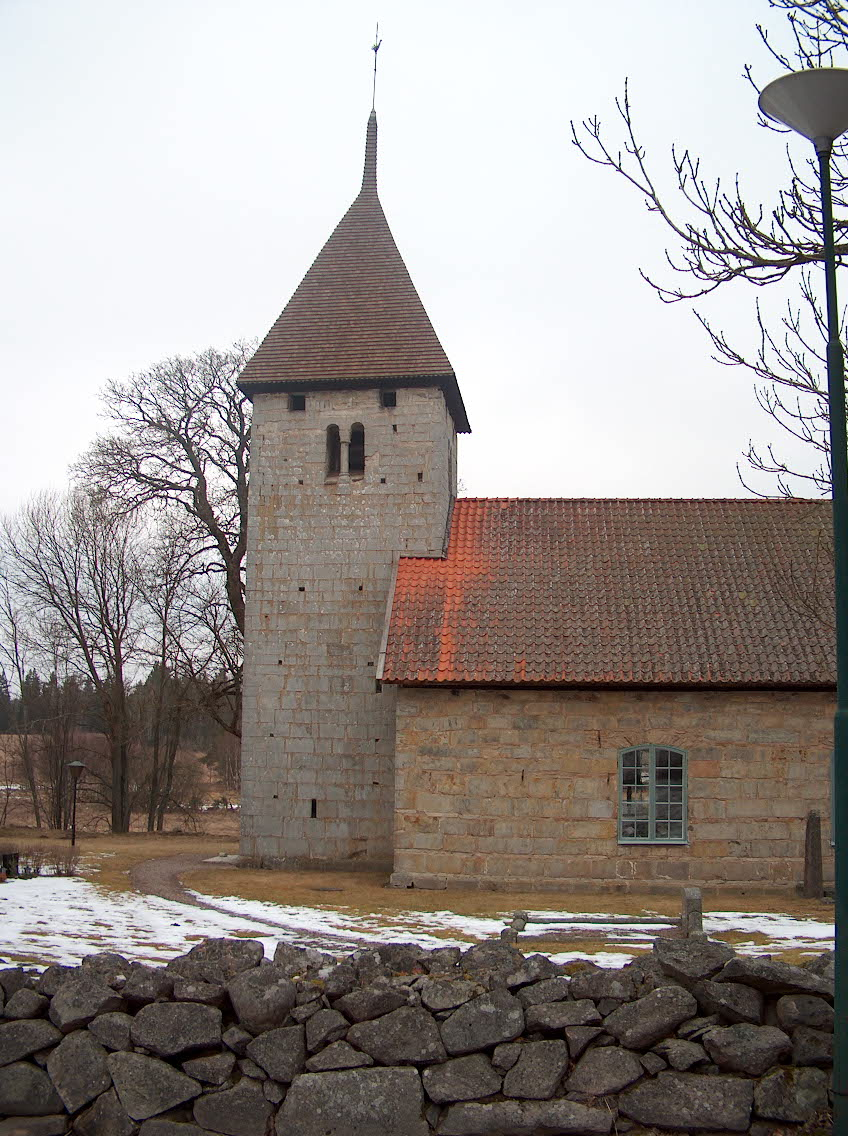
Example of a medieval Swedish church in the Tidaholm area.

== Demographics ==
This is a demographic table based on Tidaholm Municipality's electoral districts in the 2022 Swedish general election sourced from SVT's election platform, in turn taken from SCB official statistics.

In total there were 12,810 inhabitants, including 9,966 Swedish citizens of voting age. 46.9% voted for the left coalition and 52.0% for the right coalition. Indicators are in percentage points except population totals and income.

Location	Residents	Citizen adults	Left vote	Right vote	Employed	Swedish parents	Foreign heritage	Income SEK	Degree
Location			%	%					
Dimbo	1,828	1,404	40.3	58.7	85	92	8	25,353	29
Hökensås N	2,072	1,576	44.8	54.3	87	93	7	27,779	36
Hökensås SV	1,830	1,443	35.8	62.9	86	92	8	25,998	25
Tidaholm Inner	1,923	1,501	51.2	47.4	72	75	25	20,955	26
Tidaholm N	1,703	1,304	51.4	47.8	84	86	14	25,458	26
Tidaholm V	1,614	1,345	54.1	45.7	80	86	14	23,393	26
Tidaholm Ö	1,840	1,393	52.0	46.4	76	80	20	22,558	27
Source: SVT

== Sister City ==
- Tukums, Latvia
