= Monica Green (politician) =

Swedish politician (born 1959)

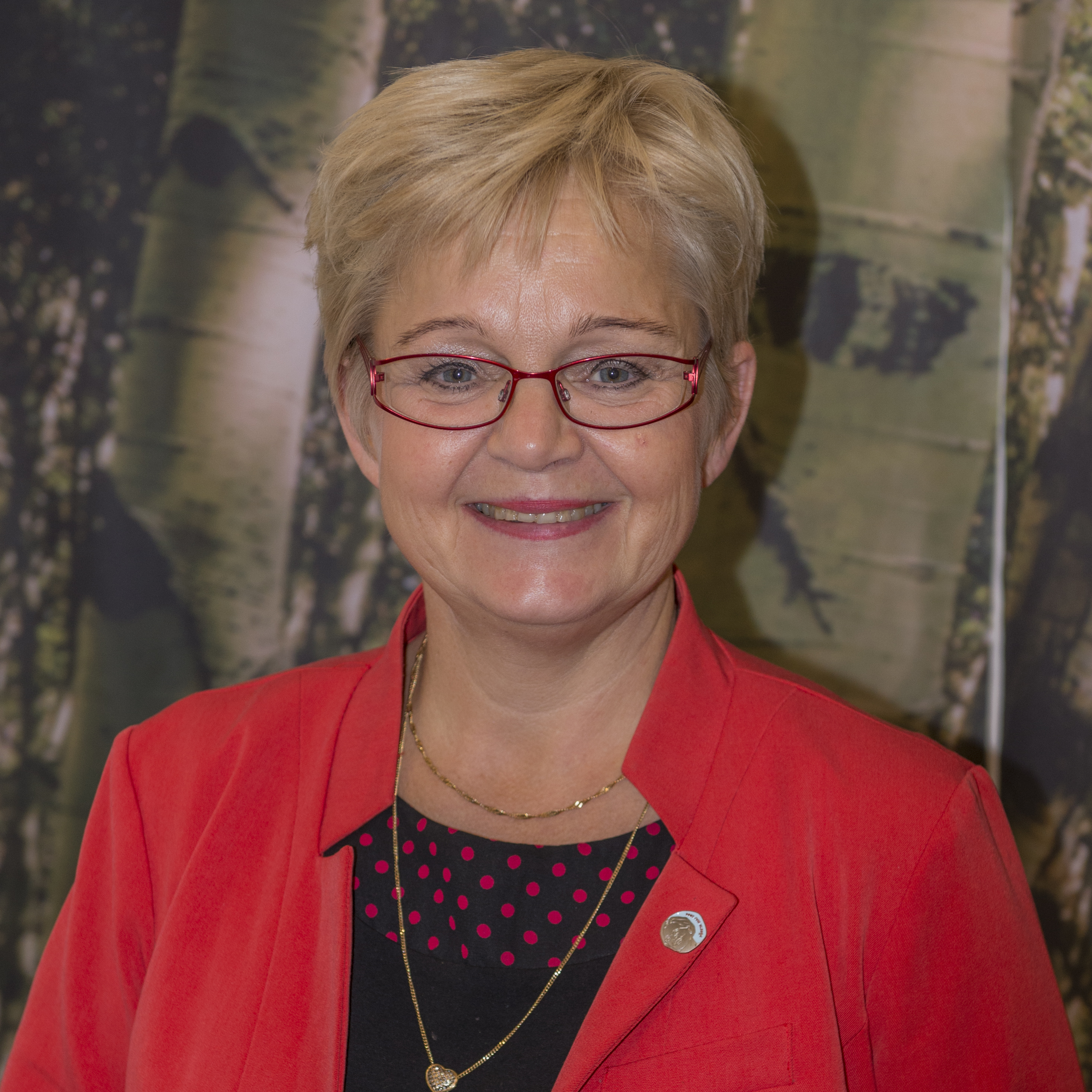

Member of the Riksdag
- In office 1994–2018

Personal details
- Political party: Social Democratic
- Website: http://monicagreen.webblogg.se/

Monica Green (born 1959) is a Swedish Social Democratic politician who was a member of the Riksdag from 1994 to 2018.

Green has advocated for legalising incest between adults.
