= List of members of the Riksdag, 1994–1998 =

This is a list of members of the Riksdag, the national parliament of Sweden. The Riksdag is a unicameral assembly with 349 members of parliament (Swedish: riksdagsledamöter), who are elected on a proportional basis to serve fixed terms of four years. In the Riksdag, members are seated per constituency and not party. The following MPs were elected in the 1994 Swedish general election.

== Invalda parliamentarians ==
Name	Party	Constituency, seat
Elisa Abascal Reyes	Green Party	Södermanlands län, seat no. 85
Urban Ahlin	Social Democrats	Skaraborgs län, seat no. 249
Johnny Ahlqvist	Social Democrats	Kristianstads län, seat no. 147
Rigmor Ahlstedt	Centre Party	Uppsala län, seat no. 72
Christel Anderberg	Moderate Party	Kopparbergs län, seat no. 291
Arne Andersson	Moderate Party	Älvsborgs läns norra, seat no. 221
Axel Andersson	Social Democrats	Gävleborgs län, seat no. 299
Barbro Andersson Öhrn	Social Democrats	Uppsala län, seat no. 69
Elving Andersson	Centre Party	Bohuslän, seat no. 212
Hans Andersson	Left Party	Kopparbergs län, seat no. 294
Ingrid Andersson	Social Democrats	Uppsala län, seat no. 64
Margareta Andersson	Centre Party	Jönköpings län, seat no. 105
Marianne Andersson	Centre Party	Älvsborgs läns norra, seat no. 225
Sten Andersson	Moderate Party	Malmö kommun, seat no. 157
Widar Andersson	Social Democrats	Gävleborgs län, seat no. 306
Berit Andnor	Social Democrats	Jämtlands län, seat no. 324
Kia Andreasson	Green Party	Göteborgs kommun, seat no. 204
Eva Arvidsson	Social Democrats	Stockholms län, seat no. 27
Beatrice Ask	Moderate Party	Stockholms kommun, seat no. 21
Nils Fredrik Aurelius	Moderate Party	Kalmar län, seat no. 126
Jan Backman	Moderate Party	Malmöhus läns norra, seat no. 164
Erling Bager	Liberal People's Party	Göteborgs kommun, seat no. 195
Lennart Beijer	Left Party	Kalmar län, seat no. 128
Inga Berggren	Moderate Party	Malmöhus läns södra, seat no. 177
Rune Berglund	Social Democrats	Jämtlands län, seat no. 325
Mona Berglund Nilsson	Social Democrats	Bohuslän, seat no. 219
Jan Bergqvist	Social Democrats	Göteborgs kommun, seat no. 191
Peter Weibull Bernström	Moderate Party	Malmöhus läns norra, seat no. 165
Carl Bildt	Moderate Party	Stockholms kommun, seat no. 6
Per Bill	Moderate Party	Uppsala län, seat no. 73
Knut Billing	Moderate Party	Stockholms län, seat no. 30
Karl-Göran Biörsmark	Liberal People's Party	Östergötlands län, seat no. 90
Laila Bjurling	Social Democrats	Södermanlands län, seat no. 75
Charlotta L. Bjälkebring	Left Party	Södermanlands län, seat no. 84
Anders Björck	Moderate Party	Jönköpings län, seat no. 102
Ulf Björklund	Kristdemokraterna	Kopparbergs län, seat no. 292
Jan Björkman	Social Democrats	Blekinge län, seat no. 137
Lars Björkman	Moderate Party	Älvsborgs läns södra, seat no. 236
Eva Björne	Moderate Party	Västernorrlands län, seat no. 318
Maud Björnemalm	Social Democrats	Örebro län, seat no. 263
Britt Bohlin	Social Democrats	Älvsborgs läns norra, seat no. 227
Sinikka Bohlin	Social Democrats	Gävleborgs län, seat no. 303
Sigrid Bolkéus	Social Democrats	Gävleborgs län, seat no. 301
Claes-Göran Brandin	Social Democrats	Göteborgs kommun, seat no. 205
Lennart Brunander	Centre Party	Älvsborgs läns södra, seat no. 233
Ingrid Burman	Left Party	Uppsala län, seat no. 70
Laila Bäck	Social Democrats	Kopparbergs län, seat no. 298
Lars Bäckström	Left Party	Bohuslän, seat no. 213
Lisbet Calner	Social Democrats	Bohuslän, seat no. 211
Andreas Carlgren	Centre Party	Stockholms län, seat no. 58
Leif Carlson	Moderate Party	Kalmar län, seat no. 123
Birgitta Carlsson	Centre Party	Skaraborgs län, seat no. 244
Inge Carlsson	Social Democrats	Östergötlands län, seat no. 87
Sivert Carlsson	Centre Party	Kalmar län, seat no. 127
Marianne Carlström	Social Democrats	Göteborgs kommun, seat no. 196
Åke Carnerö	Kristdemokraterna	Bohuslän, seat no. 217
Birgitta Dahl	Social Democrats	Uppsala län, seat no. 63
Rolf Dahlberg	Moderate Party	Gävleborgs län, seat no. 300
Lennart Daléus	Centre Party	Stockholms län, seat no. 49
Britt-Marie Danestig-Olofsson	Left Party	Östergötlands län, seat no. 99
Torgny Danielsson	Social Democrats	Värmlands län, seat no. 260
Siri Dannaeus	Liberal People's Party	Södermanlands län, seat no. 82
Inger Davidson	Kristdemokraterna	Stockholms län, seat no. 47
Susanne Eberstein	Social Democrats	Västernorrlands län, seat no. 322
Margitta Edgren	Liberal People's Party	Malmöhus läns södra, seat no. 173
Erik Arthur Egervärn	Centre Party	Jämtlands län, seat no. 326
Christer Eirefelt	Liberal People's Party	Hallands län, seat no. 182
Maud Ekendahl	Moderate Party	Kristianstads län, seat no. 141
Berndt Ekholm	Social Democrats	Älvsborgs läns södra, seat no. 235
Tomas Eneroth	Social Democrats	Kronobergs län, seat no. 120
Marie Engström	Left Party	Värmlands län, seat no. 254
Dag Ericson	Social Democrats	Stockholms län, seat no. 59
Dan Ericsson	Kristdemokraterna	Östergötlands län, seat no. 96
Kjell Ericsson	Centre Party	Värmlands län, seat no. 259
Alf Eriksson	Social Democrats	Hallands län, seat no. 187
Eva Eriksson	Liberal People's Party	Skaraborgs län, seat no. 246
Ingvar Eriksson	Moderate Party	Kristianstads län, seat no. 143
Per-Ola Eriksson	Centre Party	Norrbottens län, seat no. 339
Peter Eriksson	Green Party	Västerbottens län, seat no. 337
Eskil Erlandsson	Centre Party	Kronobergs län, seat no. 119
Gustaf von Essen	Moderate Party	Uppsala län, seat no. 67
Rune Evensson	Social Democrats	Älvsborgs läns norra, seat no. 223
Ann-Marie Fagerström	Social Democrats	Kalmar län, seat no. 130
Karin Falkmer	Moderate Party	Västmanlands län, seat no. 279
Bo Finnkvist	Social Democrats	Värmlands län, seat no. 253
Elisabeth Fleetwood	Moderate Party	Stockholms kommun, seat no. 5
Eva Flyborg	Liberal People's Party	Göteborgs kommun, seat no. 206
Juan Fonseca	Social Democrats	Stockholms kommun, seat no. 20
Bodil Francke Ohlsson	Green Party	Malmöhus läns södra, seat no. 175
Sonja Fransson	Social Democrats	Älvsborgs läns södra, seat no. 238
Jan-Olof Franzén	Moderate Party	Kronobergs län, seat no. 118
Rose-Marie Frebran	Kristdemokraterna	Örebro län, seat no. 267
Lennart Fremling	Liberal People's Party	Kopparbergs län, seat no. 293
Lennart Fridén	Moderate Party	Göteborgs kommun, seat no. 203
Birgit Friggebo	Liberal People's Party	Stockholms kommun, seat no. 7
Helena Frisk	Social Democrats	Örebro län, seat no. 272
Viola Furubjelke	Social Democrats	Östergötlands län, seat no. 91
Reynoldh Furustrand	Social Democrats	Södermanlands län, seat no. 78
Torsten Gavelin	Liberal People's Party	Västerbottens län, seat no. 334
Margit Gennser	Moderate Party	Malmö kommun, seat no. 154
Birgitta Gidblom	Social Democrats	Norrbottens län, seat no. 345
Sigge Godin	Liberal People's Party	Västernorrlands län, seat no. 314
Eva Goës	Green Party	Stockholms kommun, seat no. 19
Gunnar Goude	Green Party	Uppsala län, seat no. 71
Carl Fredrik Graf	Moderate Party	Hallands län, seat no. 185
Lars U. Granberg	Social Democrats	Norrbottens län, seat no. 349
Marie Granlund	Social Democrats	Malmö kommun, seat no. 159
Per Erik Granström	Social Democrats	Kopparbergs län, seat no. 295
Stig Grauers	Moderate Party	Bohuslän, seat no. 215
Monica Green	Social Democrats	Skaraborgs län, seat no. 248
Rolf Gunnarsson	Moderate Party	Kopparbergs län, seat no. 296
Holger Gustafsson	Kristdemokraterna	Skaraborgs län, seat no. 245
Åke Gustavsson	Social Democrats	Jönköpings län, seat no. 101
Michael Hagberg	Social Democrats	Södermanlands län, seat no. 83
Karl Hagström	Social Democrats	Gävleborgs län, seat no. 302
Birger Hagård	Moderate Party	Östergötlands län, seat no. 86
Isa Halvarsson	Liberal People's Party	Värmlands län, seat no. 257
Birgitta Hambraeus	Centre Party	Kopparbergs län, seat no. 286
Agne Hansson	Centre Party	Kalmar län, seat no. 121
Lars Hedfors	Social Democrats	Kronobergs län, seat no. 115
Carl Erik Hedlund	Moderate Party	Stockholms kommun, seat no. 13
Lennart Hedquist	Moderate Party	Uppsala län, seat no. 68
Kerstin Heinemann	Liberal People's Party	Västmanlands län, seat no. 280
Chris Heister	Moderate Party	Stockholms län, seat no. 52
Owe Hellberg	Left Party	Gävleborgs län, seat no. 310
Gun Hellsvik	Moderate Party	Malmöhus läns södra, seat no. 180
Tom Heyman	Moderate Party	Göteborgs kommun, seat no. 198
Barbro Hietala Nordlund	Social Democrats	Kopparbergs län, seat no. 297
Lena Hjelm-Wallén	Social Democrats	Västmanlands län, seat no. 275
Lars Hjertén	Moderate Party	Skaraborgs län, seat no. 242
Hans Hjortzberg-Nordlund	Moderate Party	Hallands län, seat no. 188
Ulla Hoffmann	Left Party	Stockholms län, seat no. 56
Håkan Holmberg	Liberal People's Party	Uppsala län, seat no. 65
Nils-Göran Holmqvist	Social Democrats	Örebro län, seat no. 270
Sven Hulterström	Social Democrats	Göteborgs kommun, seat no. 197
Bengt Hurtig	Left Party	Norrbottens län, seat no. 342
Per Olof Håkansson	Social Democrats	Malmöhus läns södra, seat no. 170
Carina Hägg	Social Democrats	Jönköpings län, seat no. 110
Göran Hägglund	Kristdemokraterna	Jönköpings län, seat no. 111
Anders G Högmark	Moderate Party	Kronobergs län, seat no. 116
Tomas Högström	Moderate Party	Västmanlands län, seat no. 283
Gunnar Hökmark	Moderate Party	Stockholms län, seat no. 32
Ingbritt Irhammar	Centre Party	Kristianstads län, seat no. 144
Karin Israelsson	Centre Party	Västerbottens län, seat no. 329
Margareta Israelsson	Social Democrats	Västmanlands län, seat no. 277
Jan Jennehag	Left Party	Västernorrlands län, seat no. 317
Anita Johansson	Social Democrats	Stockholms län, seat no. 31
Ann-Kristine Johansson	Social Democrats	Värmlands län, seat no. 261
Barbro Johansson	Green Party	Älvsborgs läns norra, seat no. 231
Birgitta Johansson	Social Democrats	Skaraborgs län, seat no. 240
Eva Johansson	Social Democrats	Stockholms län, seat no. 37
Inga-Britt Johansson	Social Democrats	Göteborgs kommun, seat no. 193
Kurt Ove Johansson	Social Democrats	Malmö kommun, seat no. 152
Magnus Johansson	Social Democrats	Blekinge län, seat no. 135
Märta Johansson	Social Democrats	Bohuslän, seat no. 218
Olof Johansson	Centre Party	Stockholms kommun, seat no. 3
Ingvar Johnsson	Social Democrats	Älvsborgs läns norra, seat no. 224
Jeppe Johnsson	Moderate Party	Blekinge län, seat no. 139
Annika Jonsell	Moderate Party	Malmöhus läns södra, seat no. 172
Elver Jonsson	Liberal People's Party	Älvsborgs läns norra, seat no. 222
Göte Jonsson	Moderate Party	Jönköpings län, seat no. 104
Ingemar Josefsson	Social Democrats	Stockholms kommun, seat no. 22
Håkan Juholt	Social Democrats	Kalmar län, seat no. 131
Thomas Julin	Green Party	Gävleborgs län, seat no. 309
Henrik S. Järrel	Moderate Party	Stockholms kommun, seat no. 4
Anita Jönsson	Social Democrats	Malmöhus läns södra, seat no. 176
Marianne Jönsson	Social Democrats	Kristianstads län, seat no. 150
Björn Kaaling	Social Democrats	Uppsala län, seat no. 66
Hans Karlsson	Social Democrats	Örebro län, seat no. 268
Ola Karlsson	Moderate Party	Örebro län, seat no. 269
Rinaldo Karlsson	Social Democrats	Västerbottens län, seat no. 331
Sonia Karlsson	Social Democrats	Östergötlands län, seat no. 94
Rolf Kenneryd	Centre Party	Hallands län, seat no. 183
Ulf Kero	Social Democrats	Norrbottens län, seat no. 347
Arne Kjörnsberg	Social Democrats	Älvsborgs läns södra, seat no. 234
Lena Klevenås	Social Democrats	Älvsborgs läns norra, seat no. 229
Maj-Inger Klingvall	Social Democrats	Östergötlands län, seat no. 95
Lennart Klockare	Social Democrats	Norrbottens län, seat no. 344
Göthe Knutson	Moderate Party	Värmlands län, seat no. 251
Inger Koch	Moderate Party	Stockholms län, seat no. 36
Ronny Korsberg	Green Party	Jönköpings län, seat no. 113
Ulf Kristersson	Moderate Party	Stockholms kommun, seat no. 17
Kerstin Kristiansson Karlstedt	Social Democrats	Västernorrlands län, seat no. 315
Bengt Kronblad	Social Democrats	Kalmar län, seat no. 122
Kenneth Kvist	Left Party	Stockholms kommun, seat no. 23
Bo Könberg	Liberal People's Party	Stockholms kommun, seat no. 9
Per Lager	Green Party	Bohuslän, seat no. 220
Jarl Lander	Social Democrats	Värmlands län, seat no. 256
Henrik Landerholm	Moderate Party	Södermanlands län, seat no. 80
Ewa Larsson	Green Party	Stockholms kommun, seat no. 24
Kaj Larsson	Social Democrats	Kristianstads län, seat no. 146
Lena Larsson	Social Democrats	Malmöhus läns norra, seat no. 167
Roland Larsson	Centre Party	Östergötlands län, seat no. 93
Frank Lassen	Social Democrats	Värmlands län, seat no. 255
Lars Leijonborg	Liberal People's Party	Stockholms län, seat no. 38
Sören Lekberg	Social Democrats	Stockholms län, seat no. 33
Göran Lennmarker	Moderate Party	Stockholms län, seat no. 46
Lars Lilja	Social Democrats	Västerbottens län, seat no. 328
Mats Lindberg	Social Democrats	Västerbottens län, seat no. 330
Gullan Lindblad	Moderate Party	Värmlands län, seat no. 252
Tanja Linderborg	Left Party	Västmanlands län, seat no. 281
Sylvia Lindgren	Social Democrats	Stockholms kommun, seat no. 18
Olle Lindström	Moderate Party	Norrbottens län, seat no. 343
Gudrun Lindvall	Green Party	Stockholms län, seat no. 55
Agneta Lundberg	Social Democrats	Västernorrlands län, seat no. 321
Carin Lundberg	Social Democrats	Västerbottens län, seat no. 332
Inger Lundberg	Social Democrats	Örebro län, seat no. 266
Sven Lundberg	Social Democrats	Västernorrlands län, seat no. 311
Bo Lundgren	Moderate Party	Kristianstads län, seat no. 142
Ulla Löfgren	Moderate Party	Västerbottens län, seat no. 336
Berit Löfstedt	Social Democrats	Östergötlands län, seat no. 88
Johan Lönnroth	Left Party	Göteborgs kommun, seat no. 201
Lars-Erik Lövdén	Social Democrats	Malmö kommun, seat no. 153
Göran Magnusson	Social Democrats	Västmanlands län, seat no. 278
Leif Marklund	Social Democrats	Norrbottens län, seat no. 340
Jerry Martinger	Moderate Party	Stockholms län, seat no. 39
Ulf Melin	Moderate Party	Jönköpings län, seat no. 108
Ulrica Messing	Social Democrats	Gävleborgs län, seat no. 307
Maggi Mikaelsson	Left Party	Västerbottens län, seat no. 333
Carina Moberg	Social Democrats	Stockholms län, seat no. 62
Anders Nilsson	Social Democrats	Skaraborgs län, seat no. 241
Annika Nilsson	Social Democrats	Malmöhus läns norra, seat no. 169
Bo Nilsson	Social Democrats	Malmöhus läns norra, seat no. 161
Börje Nilsson	Social Democrats	Kristianstads län, seat no. 140
Carl G. Nilsson	Moderate Party	Östergötlands län, seat no. 92
Christin Nilsson	Social Democrats	Malmöhus läns norra, seat no. 163
Helena Nilsson	Centre Party	Malmöhus läns norra, seat no. 168
Lennart Nilsson	Social Democrats	Bohuslän, seat no. 208
Martin Nilsson	Social Democrats	Jönköpings län, seat no. 109
Margareta E. Nordenvall	Moderate Party	Stockholms län, seat no. 57
Annika Nordgren Christensen	Green Party	Skaraborgs län, seat no. 250
Kjell Nordström	Social Democrats	Skaraborgs län, seat no. 243
Kristina Nordström	Social Democrats	Stockholms kommun, seat no. 8
Patrik Norinder	Moderate Party	Gävleborgs län, seat no. 305
Pär Nuder	Social Democrats	Stockholms län, seat no. 61
Sven-Åke Nygårds	Social Democrats	Stockholms kommun, seat no. 10
Elizabeth Nyström	Moderate Party	Älvsborgs läns norra, seat no. 226
Ingrid Näslund	Kristdemokraterna	Göteborgs kommun, seat no. 200
Mats Odell	Kristdemokraterna	Stockholms län, seat no. 50
Mikael Odenberg	Moderate Party	Stockholms kommun, seat no. 15
Ronny Olander	Social Democrats	Malmöhus läns södra, seat no. 181
Bengt Harding Olson	Liberal People's Party	Kristianstads län, seat no. 145
Karin Olsson	Social Democrats	Blekinge län, seat no. 138
Kent Olsson	Moderate Party	Bohuslän, seat no. 216
Berit Oscarsson	Social Democrats	Västmanlands län, seat no. 276
Roy Ottosson	Green Party	Västernorrlands län, seat no. 320
Sverre Palm	Social Democrats	Bohuslän, seat no. 209
Nikos Papadopoulos	Social Democrats	Stockholms kommun, seat no. 1
Nalin Pekgul	Social Democrats	Stockholms kommun, seat no. 26
Anita Persson	Social Democrats	Södermanlands län, seat no. 76
Bertil Persson	Moderate Party	Malmö kommun, seat no. 158
Catherine Persson	Social Democrats	Malmöhus läns södra, seat no. 178
Göran Persson	Social Democrats	Södermanlands län, seat no. 79
Karl-Erik Persson	Left Party	Örebro län, seat no. 265
Leo Persson	Social Democrats	Kopparbergs län, seat no. 289
My Persson	Moderate Party	Göteborgs kommun, seat no. 202
Siw Persson	Liberal People's Party	Malmöhus läns norra, seat no. 162
Eva Persson Sellin	Social Democrats	Norrbottens län, seat no. 346
Thage G Peterson	Social Democrats	Stockholms län, seat no. 28
Christina Pettersson	Social Democrats	Stockholms län, seat no. 51
Karin Pilsäter	Liberal People's Party	Stockholms län, seat no. 34
Ragnhild Pohanka	Green Party	Kopparbergs län, seat no. 290
Marietta de Pourbaix-Lundin	Moderate Party	Stockholms län, seat no. 40
Chatrine Pålsson	Kristdemokraterna	Kalmar län, seat no. 124
Ola Rask	Social Democrats	Stockholms län, seat no. 54
Fredrik Reinfeldt	Moderate Party	Stockholms län, seat no. 53
Sonja Rembo	Moderate Party	Göteborgs kommun, seat no. 192
Inger René	Moderate Party	Bohuslän, seat no. 214
Stig Rindborg	Moderate Party	Stockholms län, seat no. 44
Agneta Ringman	Social Democrats	Kalmar län, seat no. 129
Fanny Rizell	Kristdemokraterna	Älvsborgs läns norra, seat no. 228
Lennart Rohdin	Liberal People's Party	Gävleborgs län, seat no. 308
Per Rosengren	Left Party	Skaraborgs län, seat no. 247
Yvonne Ruwaida	Green Party	Örebro län, seat no. 274
Rune Rydén	Moderate Party	Malmöhus läns södra, seat no. 171
Bengt-Ola Ryttar	Social Democrats	Kopparbergs län, seat no. 288
Catarina Rönnung	Social Democrats	Jönköpings län, seat no. 103
Pär-Axel Sahlberg	Social Democrats	Hallands län, seat no. 190
Ingegerd Sahlström	Social Democrats	Hallands län, seat no. 184
Marianne Samuelsson	Green Party	Stockholms län, seat no. 48
Margareta Sandgren	Social Democrats	Jönköpings län, seat no. 112
Lena Sandlin-Hedman	Social Democrats	Västerbottens län, seat no. 338
Stig Sandström	Left Party	Älvsborgs läns norra, seat no. 230
Birger Schlaug	Green Party	Östergötlands län, seat no. 98
Pierre Schori	Social Democrats	Stockholms län, seat no. 45
Gudrun Schyman	Left Party	Stockholms län, seat no. 42
Inger Segelström	Social Democrats	Stockholms kommun, seat no. 2
Ingibjörg Sigurdsdóttir	Social Democrats	Gotlands län, seat no. 133
Bengt Silfverstrand	Social Democrats	Malmöhus läns norra, seat no. 160
Ingrid Skeppstedt	Centre Party	Södermanlands län, seat no. 81
Christer Skoog	Social Democrats	Blekinge län, seat no. 134
Tuve Skånberg	Kristdemokraterna	Kristianstads län, seat no. 149
Kenth Skårvik	Liberal People's Party	Bohuslän, seat no. 210
Lisbeth Staaf-Igelström	Social Democrats	Värmlands län, seat no. 258
Karin Starrin	Centre Party	Gävleborgs län, seat no. 304
Hans Stenberg	Social Democrats	Västernorrlands län, seat no. 319
Lars Stjernkvist	Social Democrats	Östergötlands län, seat no. 97
Michael Stjernström	Kristdemokraterna	Stockholms kommun, seat no. 25
Ola Ström	Liberal People's Party	Örebro län, seat no. 271
Håkan Strömberg	Social Democrats	Örebro län, seat no. 262
Ola Sundell	Moderate Party	Jämtlands län, seat no. 327
Britta Sundin	Social Democrats	Västernorrlands län, seat no. 313
Åke Sundqvist	Moderate Party	Västernorrlands län, seat no. 312
Karl-Gösta Svenson	Moderate Party	Blekinge län, seat no. 136
Alf Svensson	Kristdemokraterna	Jönköpings län, seat no. 107
Nils T. Svensson	Social Democrats	Malmö kommun, seat no. 155
Sten Svensson	Moderate Party	Skaraborgs län, seat no. 239
Anders Svärd	Centre Party	Örebro län, seat no. 264
Björn von Sydow	Social Democrats	Stockholms län, seat no. 60
Nils-Erik Söderqvist	Social Democrats	Älvsborgs läns norra, seat no. 232
Birthe Sörestedt	Social Democrats	Malmö kommun, seat no. 156
Ingela Thalén	Social Democrats	Stockholms län, seat no. 41
Görel Thurdin	Centre Party	Västernorrlands län, seat no. 316
Lars Tobisson	Moderate Party	Stockholms län, seat no. 29
Sten Tolgfors	Moderate Party	Örebro län, seat no. 273
Per Unckel	Moderate Party	Östergötlands län, seat no. 89
Ines Uusmann	Social Democrats	Stockholms län, seat no. 43
Paavo Vallius	Social Democrats	Västmanlands län, seat no. 282
Kerstin Warnerbring	Centre Party	Malmöhus läns södra, seat no. 179
Karin Wegestål	Social Democrats	Malmöhus läns södra, seat no. 174
Ulla Wester-Rudin	Social Democrats	Kristianstads län, seat no. 151
Per Westerberg	Moderate Party	Södermanlands län, seat no. 77
Barbro Westerholm	Liberal People's Party	Stockholms kommun, seat no. 12
Majléne Westerlund Panke	Social Democrats	Hallands län, seat no. 189
Iréne Vestlund	Social Democrats	Kopparbergs län, seat no. 287
Anne Wibble	Liberal People's Party	Stockholms län, seat no. 35
Birgitta Wichne	Moderate Party	Älvsborgs läns södra, seat no. 237
Monica Widnemark	Social Democrats	Kronobergs län, seat no. 117
Marie Wilén	Centre Party	Västmanlands län, seat no. 285
Carl-Johan Wilson	Liberal People's Party	Jönköpings län, seat no. 106
Margareta Winberg	Social Democrats	Jämtlands län, seat no. 323
Lilian Virgin	Social Democrats	Gotlands län, seat no. 132
Birgitta Wistrand	Moderate Party	Stockholms kommun, seat no. 16
Siw Wittgren-Ahl	Social Democrats	Göteborgs kommun, seat no. 199
Liselotte Wågö	Moderate Party	Hallands län, seat no. 186
Ingegerd Wärnersson	Social Democrats	Kristianstads län, seat no. 148
Anders Ygeman	Social Democrats	Stockholms kommun, seat no. 11
Kristina Zakrisson	Social Democrats	Norrbottens län, seat no. 348
Eva Zetterberg	Left Party	Stockholms kommun, seat no. 14
Hanna Zetterberg	Left Party	Göteborgs kommun, seat no. 207
Rolf Åbjörnsson	Kristdemokraterna	Västerbottens län, seat no. 335
Anna Åkerhielm	Moderate Party	Malmöhus läns norra, seat no. 166
Alice Åström	Left Party	Jönköpings län, seat no. 114
Conny Öhman	Social Democrats	Östergötlands län, seat no. 100
Monica Öhman	Social Democrats	Norrbottens län, seat no. 341
Krister Örnfjäder	Social Democrats	Kalmar län, seat no. 125
Sven-Erik Österberg	Social Democrats	Västmanlands län, seat no. 284
Sten Östlund	Social Democrats	Göteborgs kommun, seat no. 194
Thomas Östros	Social Democrats	Uppsala län, seat no. 74

== Replacements ==
Namn	Substituting	Party	Constituency, seat
Christina Axelsson	Pierre Schori	Social Democrats	Stockholms län, seat no. 45
Cinnika Beiming	Pär Nuder	Social Democrats	Stockholms län, seat no. 61
Mats Berglind	Thomas Östros	Social Democrats	Uppsala län, seat no. 74
Agneta Brendt	Ulrica Messing	Social Democrats	Gävleborgs län, seat no. 307
Björn Ericson	Ines Uusmann	Social Democrats	Stockholms län, seat no. 43
Christer Erlandsson	Björn von Sydow	Social Democrats	Stockholms län, seat no. 60
Hans Hoff	Ingegerd Sahlström	Social Democrats	Hallands län, seat no. 184
Elisebeht Markström	Göran Persson	Social Democrats	Södermanlands län, seat no. 79
Majvi Andersson	Nalin Pekgul	Social Democrats	Stockholms kommun, seat no. 26
Jörgen Persson	Margareta Winberg	Social Democrats	Jämtlands län, seat no. 323
Marina Pettersson	Bo Finnkvist	Social Democrats	Värmlands län, seat no. 253
Berndt Sköldestig	Maj-Inger Klingvall	Social Democrats	Östergötlands län, seat no. 95
Åsa Stenberg	Thage G Peterson	Social Democrats	Stockholms län, seat no. 28
Lennart Thörnlund	Eva Persson Sellin	Social Democrats	Norrbottens län, seat no. 346
Tone Tingsgård	Birgitta Dahl	Social Democrats	Uppsala län, seat no. 63
Mariann Ytterberg	Lena Hjelm-Wallén	Social Democrats	Västmanlands län, seat no. 275
