= Södermanland County (Riksdag constituency) =

Swedish electoral constituency

- Södermanlands Län
- Constituency for the Riksdag
- Location of Södermanland County within Sweden
- County: Södermanland
- Population: 300,436 (2025)
- Electorate: 229,643 (2026)
- Area: 7,058 km^{2} (2026)

Current constituency
- Created: 1970
- Seats: 9 (1970–present) (Note: Constituency seats only.)
- Member of the Riksdag: List: Mohamed Abdukani (MP); Sofia Amloh (S); Maria Forsberg (V); Martina Johansson (C); Åsa Kullgren (S); Alice Landerholm (M); Adam Marttinen (SD); Fredrik Olovsson (S); Paul Sabo (KD); Anna af Sillén (M); Mikael Strömberg (SD)
- Created from: Södermanland County

Södermanland County (Swedish: Södermanlands Län) is one of the 29 multi-member constituencies of the Riksdag, the national legislature of Sweden. The constituency was established in 1970 when the Riksdag changed from a bicameral legislature to a unicameral legislature. It is conterminous with the county of Södermanland. The constituency currently elects nine of the 349 members of the Riksdag using the open party-list proportional representation electoral system. At the 2026 general election it had 229,643 registered electors.

== Electoral system ==
Södermanland County currently elects nine of the 349 members of the Riksdag using the open party-list proportional representation electoral system. Constituency seats are allocated using the modified Sainte-Laguë method. Only parties that reach the 4% national threshold and parties that receive at least 12% of the vote in the constituency compete for constituency seats. Supplementary levelling seats may also be allocated at the constituency level to parties that reach the 4% national threshold.

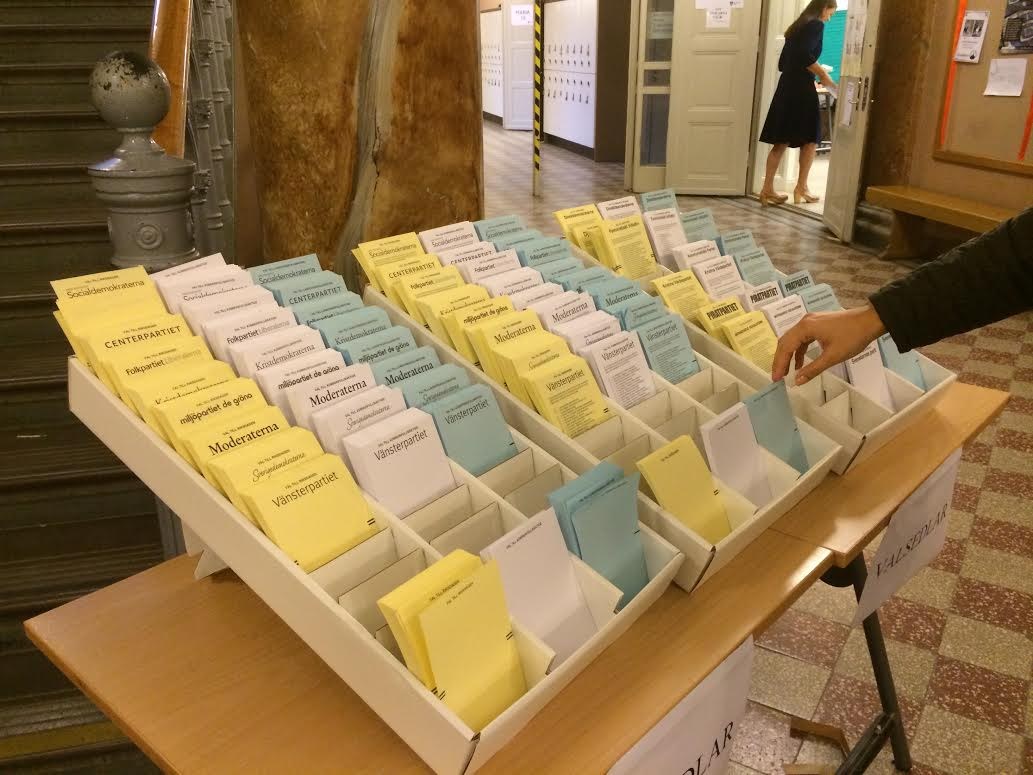
A selection of ballot papers available for voters at the 2014 general election in Stockholm - yellow for the Riksdag, blue for the regional council and white for the municipal council

Prior to 1997 voters could cast any ballot paper they wanted, though it had to contain the name of a party and the name of at least one candidate nominated by that party in the constituency. It was common for parties to hand out ballot papers with their name and list of candidates at the entrance of polling stations. Voters could delete the names of candidates or write-in the names of other candidates but in practice these options weren't used enough by voters to have any significant impact on the results and consequently elections operated as a closed system.

Since 1997, elections in Sweden follow the French model in having separate ballot papers for each party/list in a constituency. There are two ballot papers for each party - a party ballot paper (partivalsedel) with just the name of the party and a name ballot paper (namnvalsedel) with the name of the party and its list of candidates. There are also blank ballot papers (blank valsedel). Voters can initially pick as many ballot papers as they wish and then, in the secrecy of the voting booth, they select a single ballot paper of their choice. If they chose a name ballot paper they have the option of casting a preferential vote for one of their chosen party's candidates. If they chose a blank ballot paper they can write the name of any party including unregistered parties and, optionally, they can write the name of any person as their preferred candidate, even one that does not belong to their chosen party. They then place their chosen ballot paper in an envelope which is placed in the ballot box, discarding all other ballot papers they picked.

Seats won by each party/list in a constituency are allocated to its candidates in order of preference votes (a personal mandate), provided that the candidate has received at least 8% of votes cast for their party in the constituency (5% since January 2011). Any unfilled seats are then allocated to the party's remaining candidates in the order they appear on the party list (a party mandate).

== Election results ==
=== Summary ===
Election	Left V / VPK			Social Democrats S			Greens MP			Centre C			Liberals L / FP / F			Moderates M			Christian Democrats KD / KDS			Sweden Democrats SD		
Election	Votes	%	Seats	Votes	%	Seats	Votes	%	Seats	Votes	%	Seats	Votes	%	Seats	Votes	%	Seats	Votes	%	Seats	Votes	%	Seats
2026	14,005	7.33%	1	58,319	30.54%	3	9,254	4.85%	0	10,664	5.58%	0	8,654	4.53%	0	37,380	19.57%	2	10,977	5.75%	1	38,535	20.18%	2
2022	9,605	5.20%	0	60,891	32.94%	4	7,409	4.01%	0	10,989	5.94%	1	6,643	3.59%	0	35,513	19.21%	2	8,772	4.74%	0	42,547	23.01%	2
2018	12,162	6.63%	1	57,612	31.40%	3	6,773	3.69%	0	13,577	7.40%	1	7,958	4.34%	0	37,401	20.39%	2	10,089	5.50%	0	35,450	19.32%	2
2014	9,084	5.09%	0	61,834	34.62%	4	11,165	6.25%	0	9,774	5.47%	0	7,776	4.35%	0	39,991	22.39%	3	6,888	3.86%	0	26,887	15.05%	2
2010	8,637	5.04%	0	59,463	34.69%	4	13,065	7.62%	1	9,850	5.75%	0	11,299	6.59%	0	47,889	27.94%	3	8,095	4.72%	0	11,370	6.63%	1
2006	7,830	4.90%	0	67,458	42.23%	5	8,218	5.14%	0	10,942	6.85%	1	10,843	6.79%	1	37,350	23.38%	2	9,950	6.23%	0	4,050	2.54%	0
2002	10,862	7.13%	1	72,092	47.29%	5	7,346	4.82%	0	8,377	5.50%	0	18,104	11.88%	1	20,000	13.12%	1	12,655	8.30%	1	1,478	0.97%	0
1998	16,528	10.84%	1	66,147	43.38%	5	7,436	4.88%	0	7,330	4.81%	0	6,265	4.11%	0	29,499	19.35%	2	16,657	10.92%	1			
1994	8,829	5.37%	0	84,976	51.73%	5	8,280	5.04%	0	10,940	6.66%	1	11,177	6.80%	1	31,061	18.91%	2	5,579	3.40%	0			
1991	6,093	3.76%	0	71,285	43.99%	4	4,777	2.95%	0	12,903	7.96%	1	14,587	9.00%	1	29,722	18.34%	2	9,970	6.15%	0			
1988	7,673	4.81%	0	79,234	49.67%	5	8,139	5.10%	0	16,014	10.04%	1	19,209	12.04%	1	24,342	15.26%	2	3,816	2.39%	0			
1985	6,942	4.18%	0	85,681	51.56%	5	2,567	1.54%	0	18,131	10.91%	1	22,315	13.43%	1	29,905	18.00%	2	with C					
1982	6,839	4.10%	0	88,077	52.82%	6	2,807	1.68%	0	23,476	14.08%	1	9,758	5.85%	0	32,742	19.64%	2	2,741	1.64%	0			
1979	6,399	3.91%	0	83,340	50.90%	5				26,867	16.41%	2	17,478	10.67%	1	26,616	16.25%	1	2,153	1.31%	0			
1976	5,058	3.10%	0	81,178	49.76%	5				36,114	22.14%	2	17,577	10.77%	1	20,419	12.52%	1	2,286	1.40%	0			
1973	5,795	3.75%	0	78,498	50.73%	5				35,658	23.05%	2	14,242	9.20%	1	17,127	11.07%	1	2,831	1.83%	0			
1970	4,791	3.20%	0	79,586	53.10%	5				26,749	17.85%	2	22,140	14.77%	1	13,709	9.15%	1	2,650	1.77%	0			

(Excludes levelling seats. Figures in italics represent alliances/joint lists.)

=== Detailed ===
Party has received at least 4% of the vote nationally and is entitled to compete for constituency seats.

==== 2020s ====
===== 2026 =====
Results of the 2026 general election held on 13 September 2026:

Party		Votes per municipality									Total votes	%	Seats		
Party		Eskils- tuna	Flen	Gnesta	Katrine- holm	Ny- köping	Oxelö- sund	Sträng- näs	Trosa	Vingå- ker	Total votes	%	Con.	Lev.	Tot.
Swedish Social Democratic Party	S	20,517	2,867	1,897	7,684	12,094	2,861	6,209	2,421	1,769	58,319	30.54%	3	0	3
Sweden Democrats	SD	13,379	2,044	1,401	4,122	7,132	1,562	5,387	2,003	1,505	38,535	20.18%	2	0	2
Moderate Party	M	11,819	1,568	1,434	3,856	7,616	1,354	6,039	2,598	1,096	37,380	19.57%	2	0	2
Left Party	V	5,878	836	534	1,562	2,645	531	1,326	406	287	14,005	7.33%	1	0	1
Christian Democrats	KD	3,612	629	395	1,187	2,263	400	1,517	616	358	10,977	5.75%	1	0	1
Centre Party	C	3,066	554	503	1,159	2,493	278	1,646	685	280	10,664	5.58%	0	1	1
Green Party	MP	2,688	518	692	871	2,110	294	1,319	551	211	9,254	4.85%	0	1	1
Liberals	L	2,818	438	303	923	1,651	260	1,492	563	206	8,654	4.53%	0	0	0
Örebro Party	ÖP	477	41	52	207	191	80	188	56	58	1,350	0.71%	0	0	0
Alternative for Sweden	AfS	258	40	48	105	186	54	148	44	34	917	0.48%	0	0	0
Christian Values Party	KrVP	93	15	10	17	61	6	18	5	0	225	0.12%	0	0	0
Ambition Sweden	AS	55	7	15	17	20	12	36	13	3	178	0.09%	0	0	0
Pirate Party	PP	58	8	5	10	35	6	15	5	4	146	0.08%	0	0	0
Citizens' Coalition	MED	31	3	1	5	27	6	8	3	0	84	0.04%	0	0	0
Communist Party of Sweden	SKP	45	4	1	6	10	3	3	0	0	72	0.04%	0	0	0
Human Rights and Democracy	MoD	6	11	16	4	10	3	16	1	1	68	0.04%	0	0	0
Direct Democrats	DD	9	1	4	2	3	4	3	0	0	26	0.01%	0	0	0
United Voice	ER	3	1	3	1	2	7	2	0	0	19	0.01%	0	0	0
Nordic Resistance Movement	NMR	4	1	1	3	3	0	3	0	0	15	0.01%	0	0	0
Nuance Party	PNy	4	2	0	0	7	0	0	0	0	13	0.01%	0	0	0
The Push Buttons	Kn	0	0	2	2	1	1	2	0	0	8	0.00%	0	0	0
Donald Duck Party		1	0	0	0	2	0	4	0	0	7	0.00%	0	0	0
Unity	ENH	3	0	0	0	2	0	0	0	1	6	0.00%	0	0	0
Volt Sweden	Volt	0	0	1	1	2	0	0	1	0	5	0.00%	0	0	0
Classical Liberal Party	KLP	1	0	0	0	0	0	1	1	0	3	0.00%	0	0	0
Pax		0	0	0	2	0	0	0	0	1	3	0.00%	0	0	0
Turning Point Party	PV	1	1	0	0	1	0	0	0	0	3	0.00%	0	0	0
A Good Sweden		0	0	0	0	0	0	2	0	0	2	0.00%	0	0	0
Alternative Truth		0	0	0	0	2	0	0	0	0	2	0.00%	0	0	0
Communist Party	K	0	0	1	0	1	0	0	0	0	2	0.00%	0	0	0
Evil Chicken Party	OKP	2	0	0	0	0	0	0	0	0	2	0.00%	0	0	0
RegleraAI.nu		0	0	0	0	0	0	0	2	0	2	0.00%	0	0	0
Child Democrats		0	0	0	1	0	0	0	0	0	1	0.00%	0	0	0
Electoral Cooperation Party		0	1	0	0	0	0	0	0	0	1	0.00%	0	0	0
Friends of Hemp		0	0	0	1	0	0	0	0	0	1	0.00%	0	0	0
Independent Rural Party	LPo	0	1	0	0	0	0	0	0	0	1	0.00%	0	0	0
John Party with Extra Moose		1	0	0	0	0	0	0	0	0	1	0.00%	0	0	0
koalitionsbyggarna.se		0	1	0	0	0	0	0	0	0	1	0.00%	0	0	0
Lovely		1	0	0	0	0	0	0	0	0	1	0.00%	0	0	0
New Allance		0	0	0	0	1	0	0	0	0	1	0.00%	0	0	0
NY Reform	NR	0	0	0	0	0	0	0	1	0	1	0.00%	0	0	0
People's List		0	0	0	0	0	0	1	0	0	1	0.00%	0	0	0
Social Liberals		0	1	0	0	0	0	0	0	0	1	0.00%	0	0	0
Socialist Party		0	1	0	0	0	0	0	0	0	1	0.00%	0	0	0
The Referendum Party		1	0	0	0	0	0	0	0	0	1	0.00%	0	0	0
Tidö		0	0	0	0	1	0	0	0	0	1	0.00%	0	0	0
United Sweden		0	0	0	0	0	0	1	0	0	1	0.00%	0	0	0
Viking		0	0	0	0	1	0	0	0	0	1	0.00%	0	0	0
Valid votes		64,831	9,594	7,319	21,748	38,573	7,722	25,386	9,975	5,814	190,962	100.00%	9	2	11
Blank votes		649	112	64	235	329	65	254	75	52	1,835	0.95%			
Rejected votes – unregistered parties		8	3	1	5	12	1	2	3	0	35	0.02%			
Rejected votes – other		44	4	5	21	22	8	25	6	2	137	0.07%			
Total polled		65,532	9,713	7,389	22,009	38,936	7,796	25,667	10,059	5,868	192,969	84.03%			
Registered electors		80,349	11,806	8,607	26,374	45,079	9,334	29,830	11,406	6,858	229,643				
Turnout		81.56%	82.27%	85.85%	83.45%	86.37%	83.52%	86.04%	88.19%	85.56%	84.03%				

The following candidates were elected:

- Constituency seats (personal mandates) - Maria Forsberg (V), 1,012 votes; and Ulf Kristersson (M), 8,543 votes.
- Constituency seats (party mandates) - Sofia Amloh (S), 1,608 votes; Jimmy Jansson (S), 1,723 votes; Adam Marttinen (SD), 143 votes; Fredrik Olovsson (S), 1,798 votes; Paul Sabo (KD), 304 votes; Anna af Sillén (M), 750 votes; and Mikael Strömberg (SD), 100 votes.
- Levelling seats (personal mandates) - Mohamed Abdukani (MP), 484 votes.
- Levelling seats (party mandates) - Martina Johansson (C), 434 votes.

Permanent substitutions:

- Jimmy Jansson (S) resigned on 20 October 2026 and was replaced by Åsa Kullgren (S) on the same day.

===== 2022 =====
Results of the 2022 general election held on 11 September 2022:

Party		Votes per municipality									Total votes	%	Seats		
Party		Eskils- tuna	Flen	Gnesta	Katrine- holm	Ny- köping	Oxelö- sund	Sträng- näs	Trosa	Vingå- ker	Total votes	%	Con.	Lev.	Tot.
Swedish Social Democratic Party	S	20,584	3,428	2,141	8,059	12,623	2,923	6,541	2,637	1,955	60,891	32.94%	4	0	4
Sweden Democrats	SD	15,090	2,452	1,631	4,645	7,466	1,685	5,626	2,253	1,699	42,547	23.01%	2	0	2
Moderate Party	M	11,505	1,506	1,428	3,597	7,129	1,270	5,722	2,365	991	35,513	19.21%	2	0	2
Centre Party	C	3,180	616	557	1,302	2,521	276	1,607	632	298	10,989	5.94%	1	0	1
Left Party	V	3,695	506	505	1,001	1,832	515	961	326	264	9,605	5.20%	0	1	1
Christian Democrats	KD	2,949	499	319	997	1,776	251	1,188	484	309	8,772	4.74%	0	0	0
Green Party	MP	2,158	404	456	795	1,734	215	998	454	195	7,409	4.01%	0	1	1
Liberals	L	2,245	302	217	646	1,422	191	1,097	397	126	6,643	3.59%	0	0	0
Nuance Party	PNy	356	33	5	57	153	48	57	8	12	729	0.39%	0	0	0
Alternative for Sweden	AfS	154	22	25	64	74	37	90	20	22	508	0.27%	0	0	0
Citizens' Coalition	MED	122	16	19	25	49	9	44	19	6	309	0.17%	0	0	0
Pirate Party	PP	57	4	5	35	27	20	43	10	3	204	0.11%	0	0	0
The Push Buttons	Kn	42	7	3	18	29	9	18	10	8	144	0.08%	0	0	0
Human Rights and Democracy	MoD	31	9	20	12	32	3	12	19	1	139	0.08%	0	0	0
Christian Values Party	KrVP	50	14	1	20	28	14	4	4	3	138	0.07%	0	0	0
Feminist Initiative	FI	30	2	10	8	15	5	10	2	5	87	0.05%	0	0	0
Unity	ENH	11	1	6	2	16	3	10	0	1	50	0.03%	0	0	0
Direct Democrats	DD	18	0	1	4	14		7	4	1	49	0.03%	0	0	0
Independent Rural Party	LPo	4	12	3	2	6	2	10	1	0	40	0.02%	0	0	0
Climate Alliance	KA	6	0	2	4	11	4	1	0	0	28	0.02%	0	0	0
Nordic Resistance Movement	NMR	10	2	2	5	5	1	1	0	1	27	0.01%	0	0	0
Communist Party of Sweden	SKP	5	0	1	8	0	3	3	0	0	20	0.01%	0	0	0
Turning Point Party	PV	2	0	1	4	2	0	0	1	0	10	0.01%	0	0	0
Classical Liberal Party	KLP	2	0	0	1	2	0	1	2	0	8	0.00%	0	0	0
Socialist Welfare Party	S-V	4	0	0	0	1	0	0	0	0	5	0.00%	0	0	0
Basic Income Party	BASIP	0	1	0	0	1	0	2	0	0	4	0.00%	0	0	0
Hard Line Sweden		1	0	1	0	0	0	0	0	1	3	0.00%	0	0	0
Donald Duck Party		1	0	0	0	0	0	0	0	0	1	0.00%	0	0	0
European Workers Party	EAP	0	0	1	0	0	0	0	0	0	1	0.00%	0	0	0
Free Choice		0	0	0	0	0	0	0	1	0	1	0.00%	0	0	0
John Mikkonen		0	0	0	0	0	0	0	1	0	1	0.00%	0	0	0
New Democracy		0	0	0	1	0	0	0	0	0	1	0.00%	0	0	0
Political Shift		0	1	0	0	0	0	0	0	0	1	0.00%	0	0	0
Positive Community Initiative	PSI	0	0	0	1	0	0	0	0	0	1	0.00%	0	0	0
Referendum Party		1	0	0	0	0	0	0	0	0	1	0.00%	0	0	0
Scania Party	SKÅ	0	0	0	1	0	0	0	0	0	1	0.00%	0	0	0
Valid votes		62,313	9,837	7,360	21,314	36,968	7,484	24,053	9,650	5,901	184,880	100.00%	9	2	11
Blank votes		643	95	82	212	366	53	233	86	56	1,826	0.98%			
Rejected votes – unregistered parties		13	2	1	3	7	0	1	2	4	33	0.02%			
Rejected votes – other		49	5	4	21	26	4	22	6	5	142	0.08%			
Total polled		63,018	9,939	7,447	21,550	37,367	7,541	24,309	9,744	5,966	186,881	83.52%			
Registered electors		78,420	12,039	8,615	25,962	43,569	9,072	28,212	11,006	6,872	223,767				
Turnout		80.36%	82.56%	86.44%	83.01%	85.77%	83.12%	86.17%	88.53%	86.82%	83.52%				

The following candidates were elected:

- Constituency seats (personal mandates) - Ulf Kristersson (M), 7,331 votes.
- Constituency seats (party mandates) - Sofia Amloh (S), 1,626 votes; Hans Ekström (S), 964 votes; Mattias Eriksson Falk (SD), 1 vote; Caroline Helmersson Olsson (S), 537 votes; Martina Johansson (C), 450 votes; Ann-Sofie Lifvenhage (M), 433 votes; Adam Marttinen (SD), 196 votes; and Fredrik Olovsson (S), 1,386 votes.
- Levelling seats (personal mandates) - Linus Lakso (MP), 443 votes.
- Levelling seats (party mandates) - Lotta Johnsson Fornarve (V), 404 votes.

==== 2010s ====
===== 2018 =====
Results of the 2018 general election held on 9 September 2018:

Party		Votes per municipality									Total votes	%	Seats		
Party		Eskils- tuna	Flen	Gnesta	Katrine- holm	Ny- köping	Oxelö- sund	Sträng- näs	Trosa	Vingå- ker	Total votes	%	Con.	Lev.	Tot.
Swedish Social Democratic Party	S	20,210	3,338	1,862	8,054	11,724	2,993	5,384	2,073	1,974	57,612	31.40%	3	0	3
Moderate Party	M	12,488	1,706	1,456	3,745	7,368	1,199	6,102	2,407	930	37,401	20.39%	2	0	2
Sweden Democrats	SD	13,140	2,150	1,356	3,841	5,912	1,419	4,526	1,666	1,440	35,450	19.32%	2	0	2
Centre Party	C	3,713	840	774	1,730	3,133	320	1,837	814	416	13,577	7.40%	1	0	1
Left Party	V	4,286	700	596	1,293	2,363	666	1,369	470	419	12,162	6.63%	1	0	1
Christian Democrats	KD	3,027	566	370	1,144	2,360	357	1,344	558	363	10,089	5.50%	0	1	1
Liberals	L	2,970	322	250	818	1,654	250	1,123	415	156	7,958	4.34%	0	0	0
Green Party	MP	2,043	355	388	701	1,645	232	880	366	163	6,773	3.69%	0	0	0
Feminist Initiative	FI	187	29	86	63	149	30	51	32	15	642	0.35%	0	0	0
Alternative for Sweden	AfS	190	44	22	86	154	34	74	15	14	633	0.35%	0	0	0
Citizens' Coalition	MED	163	14	11	34	51	15	43	21	2	354	0.19%	0	0	0
Unity	ENH	53	7	20	12	20	1	28	9	5	155	0.08%	0	0	0
Direct Democrats	DD	46	4	7	15	36	8	13	6	2	137	0.07%	0	0	0
Pirate Party	PP	52	9	1	12	17	15	18	2	1	127	0.07%	0	0	0
Independent Rural Party	LPo	16	16	0	21	25	1	29	1	7	116	0.06%	0	0	0
Nordic Resistance Movement	NMR	21	6	4	6	31	3	10	3	3	87	0.05%	0	0	0
Animals' Party	DjuP	27	0	4	2	14	0	4	1	2	54	0.03%	0	0	0
Classical Liberal Party	KLP	16	1	0	2	16	1	3	2	0	41	0.02%	0	0	0
Christian Values Party	KrVP	12	7	5	1	7	0	0	2	1	35	0.02%	0	0	0
Initiative	INI	13	1	3	0	3	0	3	1	0	24	0.01%	0	0	0
Basic Income Party	BASIP	1	1	0	0	4	0	0	0	0	6	0.00%	0	0	0
Communist Party of Sweden	SKP	1	0	0	1	0	0	0	0	0	2	0.00%	0	0	0
European Workers Party	EAP	0	0	0	0	0	0	1	0	0	1	0.00%	0	0	0
Parties not on the ballot	ÖVR	3	2	2	2	1	1	2	0	0	13	0.01%	0	0	0
Valid votes		62,678	10,118	7,217	21,583	36,687	7,545	22,844	8,864	5,913	183,449	100.00%	9	1	10
Blank votes		583	84	75	223	307	78	222	53	55	1,680	0.91%			
Rejected votes – unregistered parties		23	3	7	2	11	1	5	6	5	63	0.03%			
Rejected votes – other		51	2	8	8	24	7	13	3	4	120	0.06%			
Total polled		63,335	10,207	7,307	21,816	37,029	7,631	23,084	8,926	5,977	185,312	86.85%			
Registered electors		74,782	11,871	8,263	25,171	41,758	8,803	26,105	9,862	6,755	213,370				
Turnout		84.69%	85.98%	88.43%	86.67%	88.68%	86.69%	88.43%	90.51%	88.48%	86.85%				

The following candidates were elected:

- Constituency seats (party mandates) - Erik Bengtzboe (M), 228 votes; Hans Ekström (S), 964 votes; 2,051 votes; Lotta Finstorp (M), 342 votes; Caroline Helmersson Olsson (S), 632 votes; Martina Johansson (C), 463 votes; Lotta Johnsson Fornarve (V), 429 votes; Adam Marttinen (SD), 238 votes; Fredrik Olovsson (S), 1,160 votes; and Roger Richthoff (SD), 57 votes.
- Levelling seats (party mandates) - Pia Steensland (KD), 81 votes.

Permanent substitutions:

- Erik Bengtzboe (M) resigned on 26 April 2019 and was replaced by Jari Puustinen (M) on the same day.
- Jari Puustinen (M) resigned on 2 May 2019 and was replaced by Ann-Sofie Lifvenhage (M) on the same day.
- Lotta Finstorp (M) resigned on 31 January 2021 and was replaced by Magnus Stuart (M) on 1 February 2021.

===== 2014 =====
Results of the 2014 general election held on 14 September 2014:

Party		Votes per municipality									Total votes	%	Seats		
Party		Eskils- tuna	Flen	Gnesta	Katrine- holm	Ny- köping	Oxelö- sund	Sträng- näs	Trosa	Vingå- ker	Total votes	%	Con.	Lev.	Tot.
Swedish Social Democratic Party	S	21,722	3,671	2,081	8,432	12,139	3,348	6,017	2,124	2,300	61,834	34.62%	4	0	4
Moderate Party	M	13,052	1,892	1,610	4,064	8,212	1,301	6,307	2,576	977	39,991	22.39%	3	0	3
Sweden Democrats	SD	10,170	1,802	911	3,054	4,477	1,066	3,225	973	1,209	26,887	15.05%	2	0	2
Green Party	MP	3,721	501	529	1,278	2,659	398	1,282	525	272	11,165	6.25%	0	1	1
Centre Party	C	2,624	762	599	1,356	2,139	206	1,198	511	379	9,774	5.47%	0	0	0
Left Party	V	3,284	552	404	999	1,722	604	1,003	278	238	9,084	5.09%	0	1	1
Liberal People's Party	FP	2,680	347	226	906	1,606	260	1,188	409	154	7,776	4.35%	0	0	0
Christian Democrats	KD	2,206	355	201	745	1,554	209	1,068	341	209	6,888	3.86%	0	0	0
Feminist Initiative	FI	1,203	164	249	390	909	148	440	179	107	3,789	2.12%	0	0	0
Pirate Party	PP	225	31	19	77	147	37	78	38	10	662	0.37%	0	0	0
Unity	ENH	106	18	26	26	38	6	31	5	27	283	0.16%	0	0	0
Party of the Swedes	SVP	36	9	9	4	26	2	10	4	1	101	0.06%	0	0	0
Independent Rural Party	LBPo	18	19	2	2	17	0	12	6	4	80	0.04%	0	0	0
Christian Values Party	KrVP	62	8	2	0	4	1	1	0	0	78	0.04%	0	0	0
Animals' Party	DjuP	23	1	6	4	16	1	6	2	4	63	0.04%	0	0	0
Direct Democrats		36	0	0	2	5	1	4	0	0	48	0.03%	0	0	0
Classical Liberal Party	KLP	15	2	0	5	5	0	4	6	0	37	0.02%	0	0	0
Socialist Justice Party	RS	4	0	0	0	0	0	3	0	0	7	0.00%	0	0	0
European Workers Party	EAP	0	0	0	0	0	3	1	0	0	4	0.00%	0	0	0
Health Party		2	0	0	1	0	0	0	0	0	3	0.00%	0	0	0
Swedish Senior Citizen Interest Party	SPI	2	0	0	0	0	1	0	0	0	3	0.00%	0	0	0
Communist Party of Sweden	SKP	1	0	0	1	0	0	0	0	0	2	0.00%	0	0	0
New Party		0	0	2	0	0	0	0	0	0	2	0.00%	0	0	0
Peace Democrats		0	0	0	0	0	0	0	1	0	1	0.00%	0	0	0
Scania Party	SKÅ	1	0	0	0	0	0	0	0	0	1	0.00%	0	0	0
Parties not on the ballot		24	2	4	5	9	5	11	5	4	69	0.04%	0	0	0
Valid votes		61,217	10,136	6,880	21,351	35,684	7,597	21,889	7,983	5,895	178,632	100.00%	9	2	11
Blank votes		702	96	72	205	378	91	228	68	59	1,899	1.05%			
Rejected votes – other		32	3	3	4	15	3	11	3	0	74	0.04%			
Total polled		61,951	10,235	6,955	21,560	36,077	7,691	22,128	8,054	5,954	180,605	85.97%			
Registered electors		73,715	11,982	7,978	25,078	41,263	8,948	25,376	9,010	6,735	210,085				
Turnout		84.04%	85.42%	87.18%	85.97%	87.43%	85.95%	87.20%	89.39%	88.40%	85.97%				

The following candidates were elected:

- Constituency seats (personal mandates) - Per Westerberg (M), 2,217 votes.
- Levelling seats (personal mandates) - Hans Ekström (S), 2,320 votes; Olle Felten (SD), 2 votes; Lotta Finstorp (M), 814 votes; Caroline Helmersson Olsson (S), 693 votes; Sara Karlsson (S), 1,417 votes; Ulf Kristersson (M), 611 votes; Fredrik Olovsson (S), 1,130 votes; and Oscar Sjöstedt (SD), 12 votes.
- Levelling seats (personal mandates) - Marco Venegas (MP), 564 votes.
- Levelling seats (party mandates) - Lotta Johnsson Fornarve (V), 339 votes.

Permanent substitutions:

- Per Westerberg (M) resigned on 30 December 2014 and was replaced by Erik Bengtzboe (M) on 31 December 2014.
- Sara Karlsson (S) resigned on 14 May 2018 and was replaced by Jacob Sandgren (S) on the same day.
- Jacob Sandgren (S) resigned on 17 May 2018 and was replaced by Leif Hård (S) on 18 May 2018.

===== 2010 =====
Results of the 2010 general election held on 19 September 2010:

Party		Votes per municipality									Total votes	%	Seats		
Party		Eskils- tuna	Flen	Gnesta	Katrine- holm	Ny- köping	Oxelö- sund	Sträng- näs	Trosa	Vingå- ker	Total votes	%	Con.	Lev.	Tot.
Swedish Social Democratic Party	S	21,003	3,923	1,897	7,956	11,688	3,288	5,526	1,758	2,424	59,463	34.69%	4	0	4
Moderate Party	M	15,352	2,451	1,946	5,175	9,479	1,719	7,268	3,092	1,407	47,889	27.94%	3	0	3
Green Party	MP	4,623	599	649	1,566	2,787	534	1,375	555	377	13,065	7.62%	1	0	1
Sweden Democrats	SD	4,646	700	397	1,299	1,805	356	1,309	432	426	11,370	6.63%	1	0	1
Liberal People's Party	FP	3,903	488	384	1,399	2,376	394	1,591	524	240	11,299	6.59%	0	1	1
Centre Party	C	2,713	831	588	1,308	2,035	211	1,376	387	401	9,850	5.75%	0	1	1
Left Party	V	3,186	561	374	955	1,618	577	868	261	237	8,637	5.04%	0	0	0
Christian Democrats	KD	2,579	496	265	885	1,837	248	1,109	402	274	8,095	4.72%	0	0	0
Pirate Party	PP	379	55	49	110	194	67	108	43	39	1,044	0.61%	0	0	0
Feminist Initiative	FI	102	17	35	33	136	27	59	23	11	443	0.26%	0	0	0
Health Care Party	Sjvåp	44	6	4	7	6	1	8	0	0	76	0.04%	0	0	0
Freedom Party		15	2	2	2	6	4	2	2	3	38	0.02%	0	0	0
National Democrats	ND	13	4	0	1	14	3	3	0	0	38	0.02%	0	0	0
Unity	ENH	6	1	6	2	5	1	4	2	0	27	0.02%	0	0	0
Rural Democrats		2	4	2	0	0	0	7	0	0	15	0.01%	0	0	0
Party of the Swedes	SVP	1	0	0	3	7	0	1	2	0	14	0.01%	0	0	0
Classical Liberal Party	KLP	5	2	1	1	0	0	3	1	0	13	0.01%	0	0	0
Socialist Justice Party	RS	4	0	0	0	0	0	1	1	0	6	0.00%	0	0	0
Spirits Party		0	1	0	1	0	1	3	0	0	6	0.00%	0	0	0
Swedish Senior Citizen Interest Party	SPI	2	0	2	0	2	0	0	0	0	6	0.00%	0	0	0
Communist Party of Sweden	SKP	2	0	1	0	0	1	0	0	0	4	0.00%	0	0	0
Norrland Coalition Party	NorrS	0	0	1	1	1	0	0	0	1	4	0.00%	0	0	0
European Workers Party	EAP	1	0	0	0	0	0	1	0	0	2	0.00%	0	0	0
Parties not on the ballot		7	0	0	4	3	2	4	2	1	23	0.01%	0	0	0
Valid votes		58,588	10,141	6,603	20,708	33,999	7,434	20,626	7,487	5,841	171,427	100.00%	9	2	11
Blank votes		699	127	71	272	375	88	274	69	78	2,053	1.18%			
Rejected votes – other		25	3	10	6	9	4	5	7	2	71	0.04%			
Total polled		59,312	10,271	6,684	20,986	34,383	7,526	20,905	7,563	5,921	173,551	84.75%			
Registered electors		71,206	12,122	7,840	24,770	40,047	8,857	24,438	8,609	6,890	204,779				
Turnout		83.30%	84.73%	85.26%	84.72%	85.86%	84.97%	85.54%	87.85%	85.94%	84.75%				

The following candidates were elected:

- Constituency seats (party mandates) - Hans Ekström (S), 2,320 votes; 2,507 votes; Gunvor G. Ericson (MP), 556 votes; Lotta Finstorp (M), 999 votes; Walburga Habsburg Douglas (M), 609 votes; Caroline Helmersson Olsson (S), 960 votes; Carina Herrstedt (SD), 37 votes; Sara Karlsson (S), 1,382 votes; Fredrik Olovsson (S), 1,205 votes; and Per Westerberg (M), 3,172 votes.
- Levelling seats (party mandates) - Liselott Hagberg (FP), 693 votes; and Roger Tiefensee (C), 710 votes.

Permanent substitutions:

- Liselott Hagberg (FP) resigned on 30 September 2012 and was replaced by Stefan Käll (FP) on 1 October 2012.

==== 2000s ====
===== 2006 =====
Results of the 2006 general election held on 17 September 2006:

Party		Votes per municipality									Total votes	%	Seats		
Party		Eskils- tuna	Flen	Gnesta	Katrine- holm	Ny- köping	Oxelö- sund	Sträng- näs	Trosa	Vingå- ker	Total votes	%	Con.	Lev.	Tot.
Swedish Social Democratic Party	S	23,614	4,604	2,064	9,613	12,893	3,522	6,148	2,091	2,909	67,458	42.23%	5	0	5
Moderate Party	M	11,576	2,004	1,566	3,824	7,543	1,285	6,130	2,372	1,050	37,350	23.38%	2	0	2
Centre Party	C	3,192	859	678	1,338	2,337	238	1,432	423	445	10,942	6.85%	1	0	1
Liberal People's Party	FP	3,706	490	332	1,438	2,152	397	1,562	531	235	10,843	6.79%	1	0	1
Christian Democrats	KD	3,104	559	334	1,135	2,409	321	1,268	471	349	9,950	6.23%	0	1	1
Green Party	MP	2,869	424	438	1,035	1,653	329	883	333	254	8,218	5.14%	0	1	1
Left Party	V	2,882	533	291	868	1,536	563	704	226	227	7,830	4.90%	0	1	1
Sweden Democrats	SD	1,523	268	147	473	775	157	418	130	159	4,050	2.54%	0	0	0
Pirate Party	PP	380	34	28	92	186	49	151	30	14	964	0.60%	0	0	0
Feminist Initiative	FI	220	33	50	67	185	26	103	48	22	754	0.47%	0	0	0
June List	JL	236	47	24	75	121	27	43	40	17	630	0.39%	0	0	0
Swedish Senior Citizen Interest Party	SPI	94	12	10	23	50	11	31	7	8	246	0.15%	0	0	0
Health Care Party	Sjvåp	84	8	8	19	17	5	16	8	3	168	0.11%	0	0	0
Unity	ENH	17	8	6	5	18	1	4	4	4	67	0.04%	0	0	0
National Democrats	ND	25	2	0	2	3	1	5	17	0	55	0.03%	0	0	0
National Socialist Front	NSF	23	3	1	12	0	1	4	3	1	48	0.03%	0	0	0
New Future	NYF	13	9	1	0	24	0	1	0	0	48	0.03%	0	0	0
Socialist Justice Party	RS	15	1	1	0	0	0	10	0	0	27	0.02%	0	0	0
Unique Party		0	0	0	0	3	9	0	0	0	12	0.01%	0	0	0
People's Will		3	0	2	1	3	0	0	0	0	9	0.01%	0	0	0
Classical Liberal Party	KLP	1	0	0	1	0	0	2	1	0	5	0.00%	0	0	0
Communist Party of Sweden	SKP	0	0	0	0	1	0	0	0	0	1	0.00%	0	0	0
European Workers Party	EAP	0	0	0	0	0	0	1	0	0	1	0.00%	0	0	0
Nordic Union		0	0	0	0	1	0	0	0	0	1	0.00%	0	0	0
Parties not on the ballot		18	13	9	2	12	2	6	4	7	73	0.05%	0	0	0
Valid votes		53,595	9,911	5,990	20,023	31,922	6,944	18,922	6,739	5,704	159,750	100.00%	9	3	12
Blank votes		1,086	173	129	333	684	169	363	113	86	3,136	1.92%			
Rejected votes – other		24	6	1	5	15	4	6	2	0	63	0.04%			
Total polled		54,705	10,090	6,120	20,361	32,621	7,117	19,291	6,854	5,790	162,949	82.01%			
Registered electors		68,718	12,315	7,411	24,576	38,804	8,688	23,205	8,020	6,948	198,685				
Turnout		79.61%	81.93%	82.58%	82.85%	84.07%	81.92%	83.13%	85.46%	83.33%	82.01%				

The following candidates were elected:

- Constituency seats (personal mandates) - Göran Persson (S), 9,287 votes.
- Constituency seats (party mandates) - Laila Bjurling (S), 652 votes; Walburga Habsburg Douglas (M), 581 votes; Liselott Hagberg (FP), 619 votes; Michael Hagberg (S), 214 votes; Elisebeht Markström (S), 421 votes; Fredrik Olovsson (S), 261 votes; Roger Tiefensee (C), 575 votes; and Per Westerberg (M), 2,422 votes.
- Levelling seats (party mandates) - Kjell Eldensjö (KD), 204 votes; Gunvor G. Ericson (MP), 302 votes; and Elina Linna (V), 357 votes.

Permanent substitutions:

- Göran Persson (S) resigned on 30 April 2007 and was replaced by Caroline Helmersson Olsson (S) on 1 May 2007.

===== 2002 =====
Results of the 2002 general election held on 15 September 2002:

Party		Votes per municipality									Total votes	%	Seats		
Party		Eskils- tuna	Flen	Gnesta	Katrine- holm	Ny- köping	Oxelö- sund	Sträng- näs	Trosa	Vingå- ker	Total votes	%	Con.	Lev.	Tot.
Swedish Social Democratic Party	S	24,090	4,679	2,327	10,293	14,633	3,815	6,742	2,547	2,966	72,092	47.29%	5	0	5
Moderate Party	M	6,164	1,180	834	2,131	4,001	666	3,220	1,183	621	20,000	13.12%	1	0	1
Liberal People's Party	FP	6,370	902	658	1,923	3,477	599	2,858	833	484	18,104	11.88%	1	0	1
Christian Democrats	KD	3,814	842	493	1,523	2,884	400	1,659	579	461	12,655	8.30%	1	0	1
Left Party	V	3,920	733	381	1,093	2,278	793	1,042	344	278	10,862	7.13%	1	0	1
Centre Party	C	2,218	731	598	1,167	1,841	129	955	320	418	8,377	5.50%	0	1	1
Green Party	MP	2,501	441	374	981	1,328	322	787	331	281	7,346	4.82%	0	1	1
Sweden Democrats	SD	677	97	36	242	237	31	86	35	37	1,478	0.97%	0	0	0
New Future	NYF	240	47	28	96	3	1	43	0	5	463	0.30%	0	0	0
Swedish Senior Citizen Interest Party	SPI	130	19	10	37	64	13	48	12	9	342	0.22%	0	0	0
Socialist Party	SOC.P	169	40	6	24	21	1	51	0	28	340	0.22%	0	0	0
Socialist Justice Party	RS	24	0	1	0	2	0	0	0	1	28	0.02%	0	0	0
Unity	ENH	6	3	0	9	1	0	1	4	3	27	0.02%	0	0	0
Norrbotten Party	NBP	6	0	0	5	2	1	1	0	0	15	0.01%	0	0	0
The Communists	KOMM	0	0	0	0	1	0	2	0	0	3	0.00%	0	0	0
European Workers Party	EAP	2	0	0	0	0	0	0	0	0	2	0.00%	0	0	0
Rikshushållarna	Riksh	0	0	0	0	0	0	2	0	0	2	0.00%	0	0	0
Other parties	ÖVR	73	10	23	19	81	20	37	30	6	299	0.20%	0	0	0
Valid votes		50,404	9,724	5,769	19,543	30,854	6,791	17,534	6,218	5,598	152,435	100.00%	9	2	11
Rejected votes		876	119	77	271	447	95	272	81	58	2,296	1.48%			
Total polled		51,280	9,843	5,846	19,814	31,301	6,886	17,806	6,299	5,656	154,731	80.09%			
Registered electors		66,196	12,253	7,282	24,394	37,870	8,512	22,231	7,571	6,877	193,186				
Turnout		77.47%	80.33%	80.28%	81.22%	82.65%	80.90%	80.10%	83.20%	82.25%	80.09%				

The following candidates were elected:

- Constituency seats (personal mandates) - Anna Lindh (S), 9,500 votes; and Per Westerberg (M), 2,342 votes.
- Constituency seats (party mandates) - Laila Bjurling (S), 419 votes; Björn von der Esch (KD), 330 votes; Reynoldh Furustrand (S), 473 votes; Liselott Hagberg (FP), 812 votes; Michael Hagberg (S), 357 votes; Elina Linna (V), 837 votes; and Elisebeht Markström (S), 255 votes.
- Levelling seats (personal mandates) - Maria Wetterstrand (MP), 1,458 votes.
- Levelling seats (party mandates) - Roger Karlsson (C), 547 votes.

Permanent substitutions:

- Anna Lindh (S) was murdered on 11 September 2003 and was replaced by Fredrik Olovsson (S) on 12 September 2003.

==== 1990s ====
===== 1998 =====
Results of the 1998 general election held on 20 September 1998:

Party		Votes per municipality									Total votes	%	Seats		
Party		Eskils- tuna	Flen	Gnesta	Katrine- holm	Ny- köping	Oxelö- sund	Sträng- näs	Trosa	Vingå- ker	Total votes	%	Con.	Lev.	Tot.
Swedish Social Democratic Party	S	22,725	4,293	1,921	9,471	13,224	3,801	6,004	2,075	2,633	66,147	43.38%	5	0	5
Moderate Party	M	9,570	1,746	1,174	3,276	5,767	832	4,674	1,579	881	29,499	19.35%	2	0	2
Christian Democrats	KD	5,076	1,112	735	1,911	3,764	531	2,056	856	616	16,657	10.92%	1	0	1
Left Party	V	5,849	1,197	561	1,958	3,246	1,021	1,559	528	609	16,528	10.84%	1	0	1
Green Party	MP	2,438	482	383	1,082	1,269	256	716	318	492	7,436	4.88%	0	1	1
Centre Party	C	1,768	671	604	1,105	1,685	142	715	244	396	7,330	4.81%	0	0	0
Liberal People's Party	FP	2,170	269	194	808	1,213	203	948	274	186	6,265	4.11%	0	0	0
Other parties		1,045	154	62	391	459	105	230	103	62	2,611	1.71%	0	0	0
Valid votes		50,641	9,924	5,634	20,002	30,627	6,891	16,902	5,977	5,875	152,473	100.00%	9	1	10
Rejected votes		1,222	237	138	403	646	111	452	95	122	3,426	2.20%			
Total polled		51,863	10,161	5,772	20,405	31,273	7,002	17,354	6,072	5,997	155,899	81.80%			
Registered electors		65,066	12,481	7,097	24,429	37,379	8,415	21,321	7,249	7,146	190,583				
Turnout		79.71%	81.41%	81.33%	83.53%	83.66%	83.21%	81.39%	83.76%	83.92%	81.80%				

The following candidates were elected:

- Constituency seats (personal mandates) - Anna Lindh (S), 5,474 votes; and Per Westerberg (M), 3,684 votes.
- Constituency seats (party mandates) - Charlotta Bjälkebring (V), 1,077 votes; Laila Bjurling (S), 1,256 votes; Björn von der Esch (KD), 835 votes; Reynoldh Furustrand (S), 2,178 votes; Michael Hagberg (S), 616 votes; Henrik Landerholm (M), 2,169 votes; and Elisebeht Markström (S), 1,082 votes.
- Levelling seats (personal mandates) - Birger Schlaug (MP), 1,771 votes.

Permanent substitutions:

- Birger Schlaug (MP) resigned on 16 October 2001 and was replaced by Maria Wetterstrand (MP) on 17 October 2001.

===== 1994 =====
Results of the 1994 general election held on 18 September 1994:

Party		Votes per municipality									Total votes	%	Seats		
Party		Eskils- tuna	Flen	Gnesta	Katrine- holm	Ny- köping	Oxelö- sund	Sträng- näs	Trosa	Vingå- ker	Total votes	%	Con.	Lev.	Tot.
Swedish Social Democratic Party	S	29,939	5,695	2,487	11,638	16,663	4,922	7,687	2,599	3,346	84,976	51.73%	5	0	5
Moderate Party	M	9,826	1,867	1,155	3,542	6,431	995	4,642	1,637	966	31,061	18.91%	2	0	2
Liberal People's Party	FP	3,947	557	351	1,382	2,089	386	1,628	538	299	11,177	6.80%	1	0	1
Centre Party	C	2,634	1,003	783	1,626	2,454	227	1,181	414	618	10,940	6.66%	1	0	1
Left Party	V	3,083	669	327	1,015	1,662	633	856	286	298	8,829	5.37%	0	1	1
Green Party	MP	2,476	542	454	1,264	1,455	314	846	358	571	8,280	5.04%	0	1	1
Christian Democratic Unity	KDS	1,785	390	215	701	1,266	166	600	213	243	5,579	3.40%	0	0	0
New Democracy	NyD	697	81	52	111	234	59	200	50	34	1,518	0.92%	0	0	0
Other parties		851	120	68	176	316	70	168	130	14	1,913	1.16%	0	0	0
Valid votes		55,238	10,924	5,892	21,455	32,570	7,772	17,808	6,225	6,389	164,273	100.00%	9	2	11
Rejected votes		835	155	103	329	445	95	288	119	103	2,472	1.48%			
Total polled		56,073	11,079	5,995	21,784	33,015	7,867	18,096	6,344	6,492	166,745	87.41%			
Registered electors		65,302	12,638	6,912	24,717	37,184	8,863	20,768	7,120	7,249	190,753				
Turnout		85.87%	87.66%	86.73%	88.13%	88.79%	88.76%	87.13%	89.10%	89.56%	87.41%				

The following candidates were elected: Elisa Abascal Reyes (MP); Charlotta Bjälkebring (V); Reynoldh Furustrand (S); Michael Hagberg (S); Henrik Landerholm (M); Maj-Lis Lööw (S); Anita Persson (S); Göran Persson (S); Conny Sandholm (FP); Ingrid Skeppstedt (C); and Per Westerberg (M).

Permanent substitutions:

- Maj-Lis Lööw (S) resigned on 8 October 1995 and was replaced by Laila Bjurling (S) on 9 October 1995.
- Conny Sandholm (FP) died on 22 February 1996 and was replaced by Siri Dannaeus (FP) on 26 February 1996.

===== 1991 =====
Results of the 1991 general election held on 15 September 1991:

Party		Votes per municipality									Total votes	%	Seats		
Party		Eskils- tuna	Flen	Gnesta	Katrine- holm	Ny- köping	Oxelö- sund	Sträng- näs	Trosa	Vingå- ker	Total votes	%	Con.	Lev.	Tot.
Swedish Social Democratic Party	S	25,397	4,886	1,881	10,168	13,629	4,465	6,003	1,909	2,947	71,285	43.99%	4	1	5
Moderate Party	M	9,595	1,682	1,080	3,296	6,269	1,061	4,335	1,576	828	29,722	18.34%	2	0	2
Liberal People's Party	FP	5,357	750	434	1,768	2,633	520	2,041	631	453	14,587	9.00%	1	0	1
Centre Party	C	3,099	1,273	842	1,997	2,886	309	1,247	495	755	12,903	7.96%	1	0	1
New Democracy	NyD	3,957	662	515	1,049	2,327	711	1,415	566	423	11,625	7.17%	1	0	1
Christian Democratic Unity	KDS	3,236	691	335	1,433	2,131	316	1,068	284	476	9,970	6.15%	0	1	1
Left Party	V	2,169	443	207	752	1,100	524	501	185	212	6,093	3.76%	0	0	0
Green Party	MP	1,465	339	244	658	887	207	533	208	236	4,777	2.95%	0	0	0
Other parties		488	39	26	134	231	70	64	25	12	1,089	0.67%	0	0	0
Valid votes		54,763	10,765	5,564	21,255	32,093	8,183	17,207	5,879	6,342	162,051	100.00%	9	2	11
Rejected votes		930	213	82	384	465	92	225	78	111	2,580	1.57%			
Total polled		55,693	10,978	5,646	21,639	32,558	8,275	17,432	5,957	6,453	164,631	87.22%			
Registered electors		65,267	12,624	6,532	24,512	36,381	9,424	19,922	6,735	7,360	188,757				
Turnout		85.33%	86.96%	86.44%	88.28%	89.49%	87.81%	87.50%	88.45%	87.68%	87.22%				

The following candidates were elected: Alf Egnerfors (S); Reynoldh Furustrand (S); Kjell Johansson (FP); Larz Johansson (C); Henrik Landerholm (M); Maj-Lis Lööw (S); Anita Persson (S); Göran Persson (S); Liisa Rulander (KDS); Anne Sörensen (NyD); and Per Westerberg (M).

Permanent substitutions:

- Larz Johansson (C) resigned on 11 May 1993 and was replaced by Ingrid Skeppstedt (C) on 12 May 1993.

==== 1980s ====
===== 1988 =====
Results of the 1988 general election held on 18 September 1988:

Party		Votes per municipality							Total votes	%	Seats		
Party		Eskils- tuna	Flen	Katrine- holm	Ny- köping	Oxelö- sund	Sträng- näs	Vingå- ker	Total votes	%	Con.	Lev.	Tot.
Swedish Social Democratic Party	S	28,522	5,437	11,066	19,573	4,799	6,650	3,187	79,234	49.67%	5	0	5
Moderate Party	M	7,671	1,423	2,662	7,588	939	3,389	670	24,342	15.26%	2	0	2
Liberal People's Party	FP	7,224	1,011	2,077	4,815	739	2,702	641	19,209	12.04%	1	0	1
Centre Party	C	4,057	1,552	2,398	5,077	414	1,603	913	16,014	10.04%	1	0	1
Green Party	MP	2,452	565	1,055	2,412	418	839	398	8,139	5.10%	0	0	0
Left Party – Communists	VPK	2,659	537	881	1,890	735	712	259	7,673	4.81%	0	0	0
Christian Democratic Unity	KDS	1,264	249	719	987	86	311	200	3,816	2.39%	0	0	0
Other parties		645	47	120	161	51	57	19	1,100	0.69%	0	0	0
Valid votes		54,494	10,821	20,978	42,503	8,181	16,263	6,287	159,527	100.00%	9	0	9
Rejected votes		668	137	254	463	62	191	85	1,860	1.15%			
Total polled		55,162	10,958	21,232	42,966	8,243	16,454	6,372	161,387	86.67%			
Registered electors		64,874	12,545	24,169	48,921	9,459	18,986	7,253	186,207				
Turnout		85.03%	87.35%	87.85%	87.83%	87.14%	86.66%	87.85%	86.67%				

The following candidates were elected: Göran Allmér (M); Marita Bengtsson (S); Reynoldh Furustrand (S); Kjell Johansson (FP); Larz Johansson (C); Maj-Lis Lööw (S); Anita Persson (S); Olle Svensson (S); and Per Westerberg (M).

Permanent substitutions:

- Marita Bengtsson (S) resigned on 5 March 1989 and was replaced by Alf Egnerfors (S) on 6 March 1989.

===== 1985 =====
Results of the 1985 general election held on 15 September 1985:

Party		Votes per municipality							Total votes	%	Seats		
Party		Eskils- tuna	Flen	Katrine- holm	Ny- köping	Oxelö- sund	Sträng- näs	Vingå- ker	Total votes	%	Con.	Lev.	Tot.
Swedish Social Democratic Party	S	31,485	5,970	11,631	20,912	5,285	7,107	3,291	85,681	51.56%	5	0	5
Moderate Party	M	9,678	1,824	3,355	9,093	1,186	3,868	901	29,905	18.00%	2	0	2
Liberal People's Party	FP	8,106	1,221	2,645	5,713	901	2,949	780	22,315	13.43%	1	0	1
Centre Party	C	4,658	1,755	2,803	5,661	418	1,702	1,134	18,131	10.91%	1	0	1
Left Party – Communists	VPK	2,526	483	812	1,611	674	608	228	6,942	4.18%	0	0	0
Green Party	MP	727	208	282	791	105	269	185	2,567	1.54%	0	0	0
Other parties		125	38	293	84	41	25	15	621	0.37%	0	0	0
Valid votes		57,305	11,499	21,821	43,865	8,610	16,528	6,534	166,162	100.00%	9	0	9
Rejected votes		479	106	208	381	66	123	61	1,424	0.85%			
Total polled		57,784	11,605	22,029	44,246	8,676	16,651	6,595	167,586	90.77%			
Registered electors		64,275	12,728	24,150	48,525	9,472	18,266	7,207	184,623				
Turnout		89.90%	91.18%	91.22%	91.18%	91.60%	91.16%	91.51%	90.77%				

The following candidates were elected: Göran Allmér (M); Marita Bengtsson (S); Kjell Johansson (FP); Larz Johansson (C); Maj-Lis Lööw (S); Svante Lundkvist (S); Anita Persson (S); Olle Svensson (S); and Per Westerberg (M).

Permanent substitutions:

- Svante Lundkvist (S) resigned on 7 October 1986 and was replaced by Reynoldh Furustrand (S) on 8 October 1986.

===== 1982 =====
Results of the 1982 general election held on 19 September 1982:

Party		Votes per municipality							Total votes	%	Seats		
Party		Eskils- tuna	Flen	Katrine- holm	Ny- köping	Oxelö- sund	Sträng- näs	Vingå- ker	Total votes	%	Con.	Lev.	Tot.
Swedish Social Democratic Party	S	32,354	6,130	12,033	21,451	5,578	7,154	3,377	88,077	52.82%	6	0	6
Moderate Party	M	10,925	2,058	3,721	9,589	1,261	4,250	938	32,742	19.64%	2	0	2
Centre Party	C	6,316	2,175	3,347	7,272	686	2,343	1,337	23,476	14.08%	1	1	2
Liberal People's Party	FP	3,900	516	1,228	2,087	389	1,190	448	9,758	5.85%	0	1	1
Left Party – Communists	VPK	2,365	470	750	1,698	677	662	217	6,839	4.10%	0	0	0
Green Party	MP	946	183	383	799	92	286	118	2,807	1.68%	0	0	0
Christian Democratic Unity	KDS	842	194	507	710	68	242	178	2,741	1.64%	0	0	0
K-Party	K-P	47	14	5	15	16	0	0	97	0.06%	0	0	0
Other parties		73	22	28	44	7	19	7	200	0.12%	0	0	0
Valid votes		57,768	11,762	22,002	43,665	8,774	16,146	6,620	166,737	100.00%	9	2	11
Rejected votes		530	95	211	368	62	120	45	1,431	0.85%			
Total polled		58,298	11,857	22,213	44,033	8,836	16,266	6,665	168,168	92.53%			
Registered electors		63,432	12,716	23,938	47,469	9,476	17,581	7,127	181,739				
Turnout		91.91%	93.24%	92.79%	92.76%	93.25%	92.52%	93.52%	92.53%				

The following candidates were elected: Göran Allmér (M); Holger Bergman (S); Kjell Johansson (FP); Larz Johansson (C); Maj-Lis Lööw (S); Svante Lundkvist (S); Anita Persson (S); Göran Persson (S); Tage Sundkvist (C); Olle Svensson (S); and Per Westerberg (M).

Permanent substitutions:

- Göran Persson (S) resigned on 17 January 1985 and was replaced by Lars Andersson (S) on 21 January 1985.
- Holger Bergman (S) died on 1 June 1985 and was replaced by Marita Bengtsson (S) on 5 June 1985.

==== 1970s ====
===== 1979 =====
Results of the 1979 general election held on 16 September 1979:

Party		Votes per municipality							Total votes	%	Seats		
Party		Eskils- tuna	Flen	Katrine- holm	Ny- köping	Oxelö- sund	Sträng- näs	Vingå- ker	Total votes	%	Con.	Lev.	Tot.
Swedish Social Democratic Party	S	30,469	5,818	11,416	20,659	5,436	6,455	3,087	83,340	50.90%	5	1	6
Centre Party	C	7,476	2,574	3,830	7,934	785	2,760	1,508	26,867	16.41%	2	0	2
Moderate Party	M	8,854	1,715	3,169	7,713	1,009	3,346	810	26,616	16.25%	1	1	2
Liberal People's Party	FP	6,824	1,004	2,301	3,889	726	1,990	744	17,478	10.67%	1	0	1
Left Party – Communists	VPK	2,256	408	673	1,567	703	587	205	6,399	3.91%	0	0	0
Christian Democratic Unity	KDS	630	175	373	620	51	160	144	2,153	1.31%	0	0	0
Communist Party of Sweden	SKP	151	18	65	87	13	46	7	387	0.24%	0	0	0
Workers' Party – The Communists	APK	99	19	20	57	19	7	7	228	0.14%	0	0	0
Other parties		99	16	19	68	13	49	9	273	0.17%	0	0	0
Valid votes		56,858	11,747	21,866	42,594	8,755	15,400	6,521	163,741	100.00%	9	2	11
Rejected votes		283	45	100	234	37	60	23	782	0.48%			
Total polled		57,141	11,792	21,966	42,828	8,792	15,460	6,544	164,523	91.87%			
Registered electors		62,690	12,776	23,811	46,371	9,563	16,806	7,069	179,086				
Turnout		91.15%	92.30%	92.25%	92.36%	91.94%	91.99%	92.57%	91.87%				

The following candidates were elected: Göran Allmér (M); Bernt Ekinge (FP); Bengt Gustavsson (S); Larz Johansson (C); Maj-Lis Lööw (S); Svante Lundkvist (S); Anita Persson (S); Göran Persson (S); Tage Sundkvist (C); Olle Svensson (S); and Per Westerberg (M).

Permanent substitutions:

- Bengt Gustavsson (S) resigned on 31 March 1980 and was replaced by Holger Bergman (S) on 1 April 1980.

===== 1976 =====
Results of the 1976 general election held on 19 September 1976:

Party		Votes per municipality							Total votes	%	Seats		
Party		Eskils- tuna	Flen	Katrine- holm	Ny- köping	Oxelö- sund	Sträng- näs	Vingå- ker	Total votes	%	Con.	Lev.	Tot.
Swedish Social Democratic Party	S	29,756	5,738	11,264	19,990	5,206	6,187	3,037	81,178	49.76%	5	0	5
Centre Party	C	10,655	3,138	5,341	10,300	1,219	3,603	1,858	36,114	22.14%	2	0	2
Moderate Party	M	6,928	1,314	2,503	5,868	683	2,515	608	20,419	12.52%	1	0	1
People's Party	F	7,245	941	2,028	3,922	733	2,038	670	17,577	10.77%	1	0	1
Left Party – Communists	VPK	1,955	324	443	1,220	543	401	172	5,058	3.10%	0	0	0
Christian Democratic Unity	KDS	738	188	389	637	59	134	141	2,286	1.40%	0	0	0
Communist Party of Sweden	SKP	155	12	68	128	34	52	5	454	0.28%	0	0	0
Other parties		34	3	1	18	3	1	1	61	0.04%	0	0	0
Valid votes		57,466	11,658	22,037	42,083	8,480	14,931	6,492	163,147	100.00%	9	0	9
Rejected votes		144	22	63	150	28	41	11	459	0.28%			
Total polled		57,610	11,680	22,100	42,233	8,508	14,972	6,503	163,606	92.83%			
Registered electors		62,480	12,548	23,773	45,274	9,134	16,083	6,958	176,250				
Turnout		92.21%	93.08%	92.96%	93.28%	93.15%	93.09%	93.46%	92.83%				

The following candidates were elected: Sven Andersson (S); Bernt Ekinge (F); Bengt Gustavsson (S); Gösta Karlsson (C); Ingrid Ludvigsson (S); Svante Lundkvist (S); Tage Sundkvist (C); Olle Svensson (S); and Sven-Olov Träff (M).

===== 1973 =====
Results of the 1973 general election held on 16 September 1973:

Party		Votes per municipality							Total votes	%	Seats		
Party		Eskils- tuna	Flen	Katrine- holm	Ny- köping	Oxelö- sund	Sträng- näs	Vingå- ker	Total votes	%	Con.	Lev.	Tot.
Swedish Social Democratic Party	S	28,902	5,691	11,133	19,025	4,898	5,913	2,936	78,498	50.73%	5	0	5
Centre Party	C	10,989	3,091	5,027	10,272	1,246	3,382	1,651	35,658	23.05%	2	0	2
Moderate Party	M	5,674	1,218	2,205	4,804	604	2,131	491	17,127	11.07%	1	0	1
People's Party	F	6,080	921	1,888	2,546	501	1,630	676	14,242	9.20%	1	0	1
Left Party – Communists	VPK	2,502	367	491	1,238	582	423	192	5,795	3.75%	0	0	0
Christian Democratic Unity	KDS	866	206	503	787	68	209	192	2,831	1.83%	0	0	0
Communist Party of Sweden	SKP	187	12	68	142	34	44	3	490	0.32%	0	0	0
Communist League Marxist–Leninists (the revolutionaries)	KFML(r)	28	7	8	9	12	1	1	66	0.04%	0	0	0
Other parties		14	0	0	3	0	8	0	25	0.02%	0	0	0
Valid votes		55,242	11,513	21,323	38,826	7,945	13,741	6,142	154,732	100.00%	9	0	9
Rejected votes		89	16	26	57	9	19	6	222	0.14%			
Total polled		55,331	11,529	21,349	38,883	7,954	13,760	6,148	154,954	92.23%			
Registered electors		60,462	12,329	23,084	42,000	8,625	14,861	6,642	168,003				
Turnout		91.51%	93.51%	92.48%	92.58%	92.22%	92.59%	92.56%	92.23%				

The following candidates were elected: Sven Andersson (S); Bernt Ekinge (F); Bengt Gustavsson (S); Gösta Karlsson (C); Tage Larfors (S); Ingrid Ludvigsson (S); Svante Lundkvist (S); Tage Sundkvist (C); and Sven-Olov Träff (M).

===== 1970 =====
Results of the 1970 general election held on 20 September 1970:

Party		Votes per municipality												Total votes	%	Seats		
Party		Daga	Eskils- tuna	Flen	Gnesta	Katrine- holm	Ny- köping	Oxelö- sund	Sträng- näs	Trosa	Vagn- härad	Vingå- ker	Postal votes	Total votes	%	Con.	Lev.	Tot.
Swedish Social Democratic Party	S	541	26,879	5,306	962	10,566	14,116	4,520	5,365	559	745	2,819	7,208	79,586	53.10%	5	1	6
Centre Party	C	622	7,256	2,254	433	3,608	4,964	614	2,386	166	435	1,333	2,678	26,749	17.85%	2	0	2
People's Party	F	174	7,851	1,063	226	2,309	2,906	774	1,878	153	115	895	3,796	22,140	14.77%	1	1	2
Moderate Party	M	143	3,350	841	135	1,404	2,325	339	1,248	129	124	357	3,314	13,709	9.15%	1	0	1
Left Party – Communists	VPK	43	2,091	244	52	347	540	492	257	46	37	156	486	4,791	3.20%	0	0	0
Christian Democratic Unity	KDS	13	682	156	17	454	488	61	167	5	37	124	446	2,650	1.77%	0	0	0
Communist League Marxists-Leninists	KFML	0	47	2	0	15	58	32	1	1	3	0	92	251	0.17%	0	0	0
Other parties		0	1	1	0	1	0	0	2	0	0	0	0	5	0.00%	0	0	0
Valid votes		1,536	48,157	9,867	1,825	18,704	25,397	6,832	11,304	1,059	1,496	5,684	18,020	149,881	100.00%	9	2	11
Rejected votes		0	61	14	0	35	23	2	10	3	4	3	95	250	0.17%			
Total polled exc. postal votes		1,536	48,218	9,881	1,825	18,739	25,420	6,834	11,314	1,062	1,500	5,687	18,115	150,131				
Postal votes		265	6,078	1,532	335	2,206	3,908	1,205	1,734	181	168	460	-18,115	-43				
Total polled inc. postal votes		1,801	54,296	11,413	2,160	20,945	29,328	8,039	13,048	1,243	1,668	6,147	0	150,088	89.90%			
Registered electors		2,045	61,042	12,581	2,417	23,081	32,465	8,886	14,404	1,375	1,844	6,810		166,950				
Turnout		88.07%	88.95%	90.72%	89.37%	90.75%	90.34%	90.47%	90.59%	90.40%	90.46%	90.26%		89.90%				

The following candidates were elected: Sven Andersson (S); Bernt Ekinge (F); Bengt Gustavsson (S); Carl Eric Hedin (M); Gösta Karlsson (C); Tage Larfors (S); Ingrid Ludvigsson (S); Svante Lundkvist (S); Tage Sundkvist (C); Olle Svensson (S); and Sven Wedén (F).
