= Jimmy Jansson (politician) =

Swedish politician (born 1978)

Member of the Riksdag
- In office 28 September 2026 – 20 October 2026
- Succeeded by: Åsa Kullgren
- Constituency: Södermanland County

Personal details
- Born: 9 May 1978 (age 48) Eskilstuna, Sweden
- Party: Social Democratic Party

Dick Jimmy Jansson (born 9 May 1978) is a Swedish politician and former Member of the Riksdag. A member of the Social Democratic Party, he represented Södermanland County from September 2026 to October 2026.

Jansson was born on 9 May 1978 in Eskilstuna. He was a teacher. He and his wife own the Jansson & Friberg consulting firm and he holds several company directorships including Kilenkrysset and Södertälje Science Park.

Jansson was a member of the municipal council in Eskilstuna and a municipal commissioner (kommunalråd). He was elected to the Riksdag at the 2026 general election. He resigned in October 2026 citing personal reasons.

Jansson is married to Lisa and has three children. He was previously married to Sara Karlsson..
