= Unizon =

Swedish umbrella organisation

Unizon is a Swedish umbrella organisation for shelters and hotlines for women, girls and young people. The organisation was founded in 1996, and as of May 2023 has 130 member organisations. Unizon is itself a member of the Swedish Women's Lobby.

The organisation began as an offshoot of the National Organisation for Women's Shelters and Young Women's Shelters in Sweden (Roks) following an infected leadership conflict in 1996, as well as disagreements over other issues, such as the policy of not allowing men to work at the member shelters. The conflict resulted in 16 member organisations leaving Roks and forming a new organisation, the Swedish National Association of Women's Shelters (Swedish: Sveriges Kvinnojourers Riksförbund, SKR). SKR changed their name to Unizon at a special annual meeting in December 2014.

== Chairpeople ==
- Elisebeht Markström (1996-2002)
- Carina Ohlsson (2002-2014)
- Zandra Kanakaris (2014-2020)
- Olga Persson (2020–)
