= Astudillo =

Astudillo may refer to:

- Astudillo (surname)
- Astudillo, Palencia, a municipality in the Spanish autonomous community of Castilla y Leon part of the Province of Palencia
- Astudillo Glacier, a glacier of Graham Land, Antarctica
