= Jacob Sandgren =

Swedish politician (born 1973)

Member of the Riksdag
- In office 14 May 2018 – 17 May 2018
- Preceded by: Sara Karlsson
- Succeeded by: Leif Hård
- Constituency: Södermanland County

Personal details
- Born: 1973 (age 52–53)
- Party: Social Democratic Party

Jacob Sandgren (born 1973) is a Swedish politician and former member of the Riksdag, the national legislature. A member of the Social Democratic Party, he represented Södermanland County briefly in May 2018.
