= Sofia Amloh =

Swedish politician (born 1986)

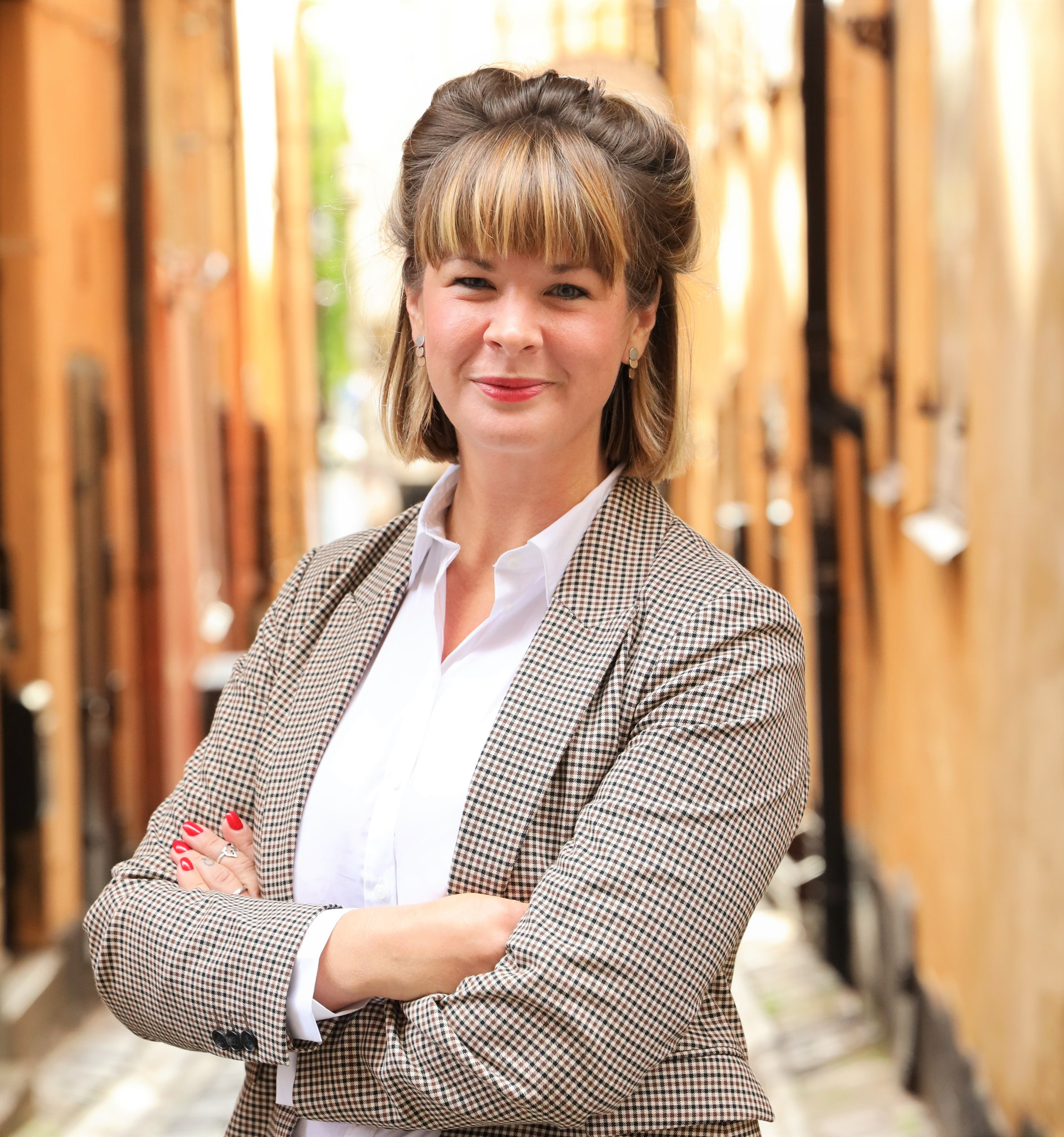
- Amloh in 2022

Member of the Riksdag
- Incumbent
- Assumed office 26 September 2022
- Constituency: Södermanland County

Personal details
- Born: 1986 (age 39–40)
- Party: Social Democratic Party

Sofia Maria Margareta Amloh (born 1986) is a Swedish politician, trade unionist and member of the Riksdag, the national legislature. A member of the Social Democratic Party, she has represented Södermanland County since September 2022. She had previously been a substitute member of the Riksdag for Fredrik Olovsson between September 2021 and September 2022.

Amloh took leave from steel manufacturer SSAB in Oxelösund to enter politics. She has held various roles at the IF Metall trade union. She is a member of the municipal council and health board in Nyköping Municipality.
