= Elisebeht Markström =

Swedish politician (born 1955)

Member of the Riksdag
- In office 1995–2010
- Constituency: Södermanland County

Personal details
- Born: 14 December 1955 (age 69); Nyköping, Sweden
- Political party: Social Democratic

Elisebeht Markström (born 14 December 1955) is a Swedish social democratic politician who was a member of the Riksdag from 1995 until 2010. Markström lives openly as a lesbian and was the first openly lesbian member of the Riksdag when she came out in February 2006.

During her time as a Member of the Riksdag Markström was a member of several key committees, and was also engaged in the movement for women's refuges and became the first chairwoman of what is today Unizon.

== Personal life ==
Markström was born in Nyköping, Sweden on 14 December 1955. In February 2006 she came out as a lesbian and about her relationship with Christine Gilljam in the Swedish LGBT magazine QX. She and Gilljam later married.

== Career ==
Before entering parliament Markström had a background in the Industrial Union. She originally entered the Riksdag as a replacement for Maj-Lis Lööw in January 1995, and remained as a member until the 2010 election. During her time in the Riksdag she was a member of the committees on Foreign Affairs, Justice, Health and Welfare, and the Constitution.

In October 1996 16 women's shelter organisations split from the National Organisation for Women's Shelters and Young Women's Shelters (also known as Roks) over ideological differences surrounding the view on men, including whether men should be allowed to work at the member shelters. These 16 organisations formed the Swedish National Association of Women's Shelters (SKR), which is today known as Unizon. At the inception of SKR Markström was the chairwoman, and remained in this position until 2002.

She has remained active in the movement, and in 2021 was chairwoman of the organisation for Women's and Girl's Shelters in Södermanland.
