= Ann-Sofie Lifvenhage =

Swedish politician (born 1976)

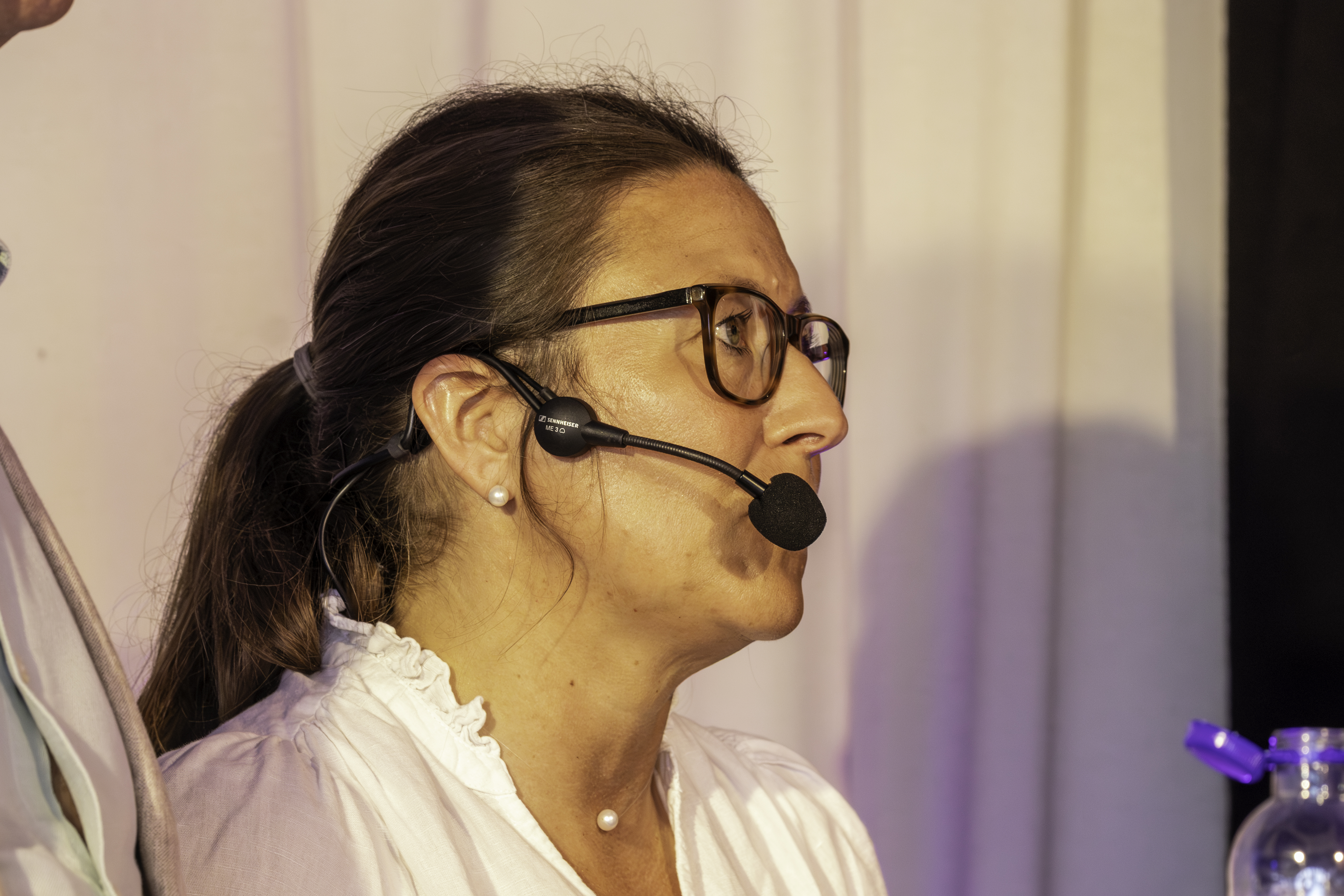
- Image of Ann-Sofie Lifvenhage

Member of the Riksdag
- Incumbent
- Assumed office 2 May 2019
- Constituency: Södermanland County

Personal details
- Born: 1976 (age 49–50)
- Party: Moderate

Ann-Sofie Lifvenhage (born 1976) is a Swedish politician. Since May 2019, she serves as a Member of the Riksdag representing the constituency of Södermanland County.

She was also elected as a Member of the Riksdag in September 2022.
