= Astudillo (surname) =

Astudillo is a Spanish surname. Notable people with the surname include:

- Luciano Astudillo, Swedish politician
- Marco Venegas Astudillo (born 1962), Swedish politician
- Martín Astudillo (born 1977), Argentine footballer
- Pedro "Pete" Astudillo, Texan songwriter
- Willians Astudillo, Venezuelan, professional Baseball player
