= Leif Hård =

Swedish politician (born 1944)

Member of the Riksdag
- In office 18 May 2018 – 24 September 2018
- Preceded by: Jacob Sandgren
- Constituency: Södermanland County

Personal details
- Born: 1944 (age 81–82)
- Party: Social Democratic Party

Leif Hård (born 1944) is a Swedish politician and former member of the Riksdag, the national legislature. A member of the Social Democratic Party, he represented Södermanland County between May 2018 and September 2018.
