= Mohamed Abdukani =

Swedish politician

Member of the Riksdag
- Incumbent
- Assumed office 28 September 2026
- Constituency: Södermanland County

Personal details
- Born: 1979 (age 46–47) Somalia
- Party: Green
- Website: Official website

Mohamed Abdukani (born 1979) is a Somalia-born Swedish politician from the Green Party. He has been a member of the Riksdag since 2026, elected for the Södermanland County constituency.

== Early career ==
Abdukani moved to Sweden from Somalia.

== Political career ==
Abdukani has been a member of the municipal council and group leader for the Green Party in Eskilstuna Municipality during the mandate period 2022–2026.

=== Riksdag ===
In the 2026 Swedish general election, Abdukani was elected through personal votes and took the Green Party's mandate in Södermanland County ahead of the party's first name Linus Lakso. He took office on 28 September of that year.

Since 6 October 2026, he has been a member of the Committee on Education and a deputy member of the Committee on Civil Affairs.

== See also ==
- List of members of the Riksdag, 2026–2030
