= Gunvor G. Ericson =

Swedish politician (born 1960)

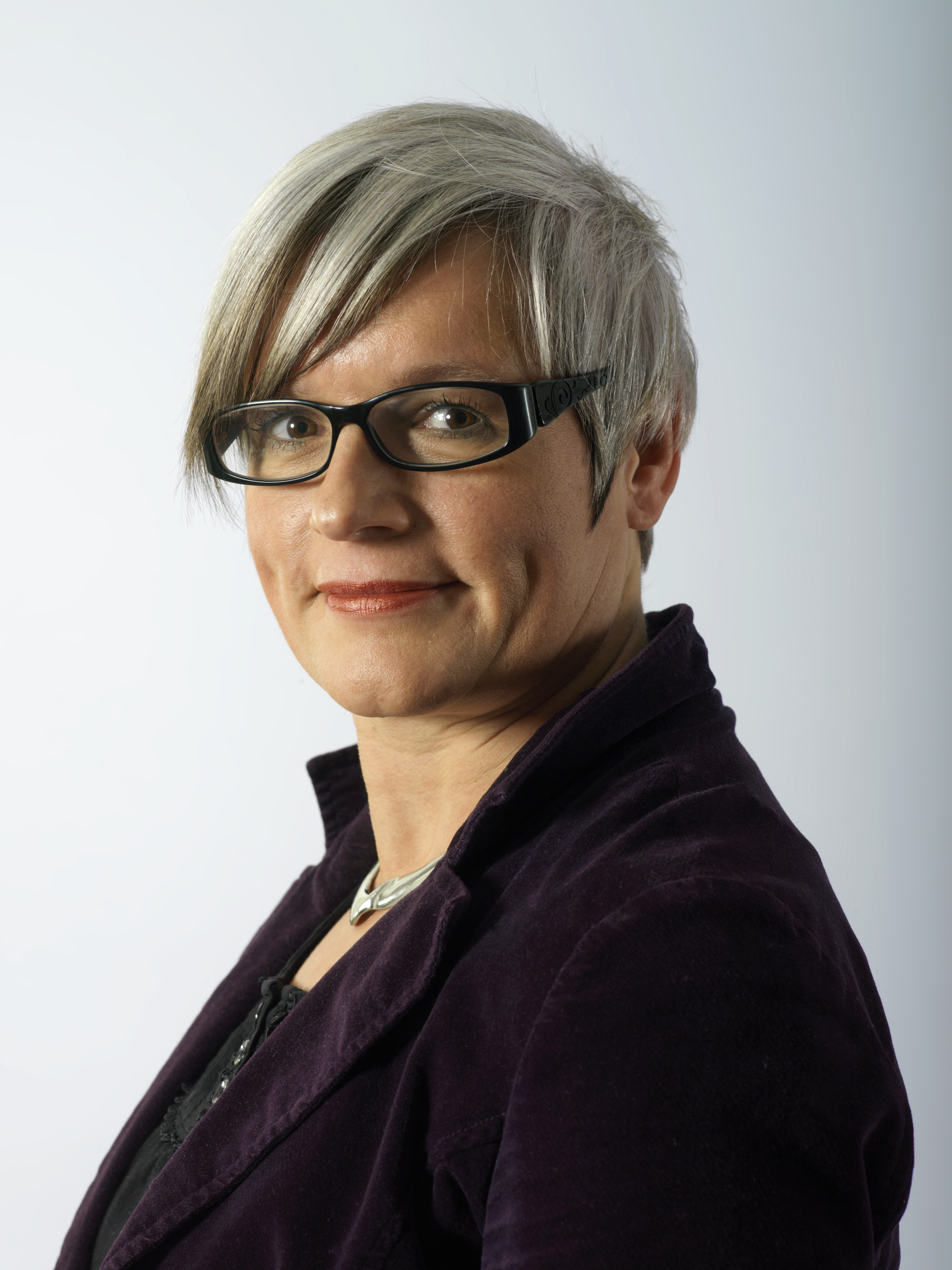
- Ericson in October 2008

Member of Parliament
- In office 2 October 2006 – 29 September 2014
- Constituency: Södermanland County

Personal details
- Born: 1960 (age 65–66)
- Party: Green Party

Gunvor Marianne Gustafsson Ericson (born 1960) is a Swedish politician and former Member of Parliament, the national legislature. A member of the Green Party, she represented Södermanland County between October 2006 and September 2014. She was a substitute member of the Riksdag for Maria Wetterstrand between October 2004 and April 2005. She was leader of the Green Group in the Riksdag from September 2011 to March 2013.

Ericson was appointed as a political advisor to the Prime Minister's Office in October 2014. She was later state secretary to Minister for the Environment Åsa Romson and state secretary to the Cabinet Co-ordination Committee.
