= Hans Ekström =

Swedish politician (born 1958)

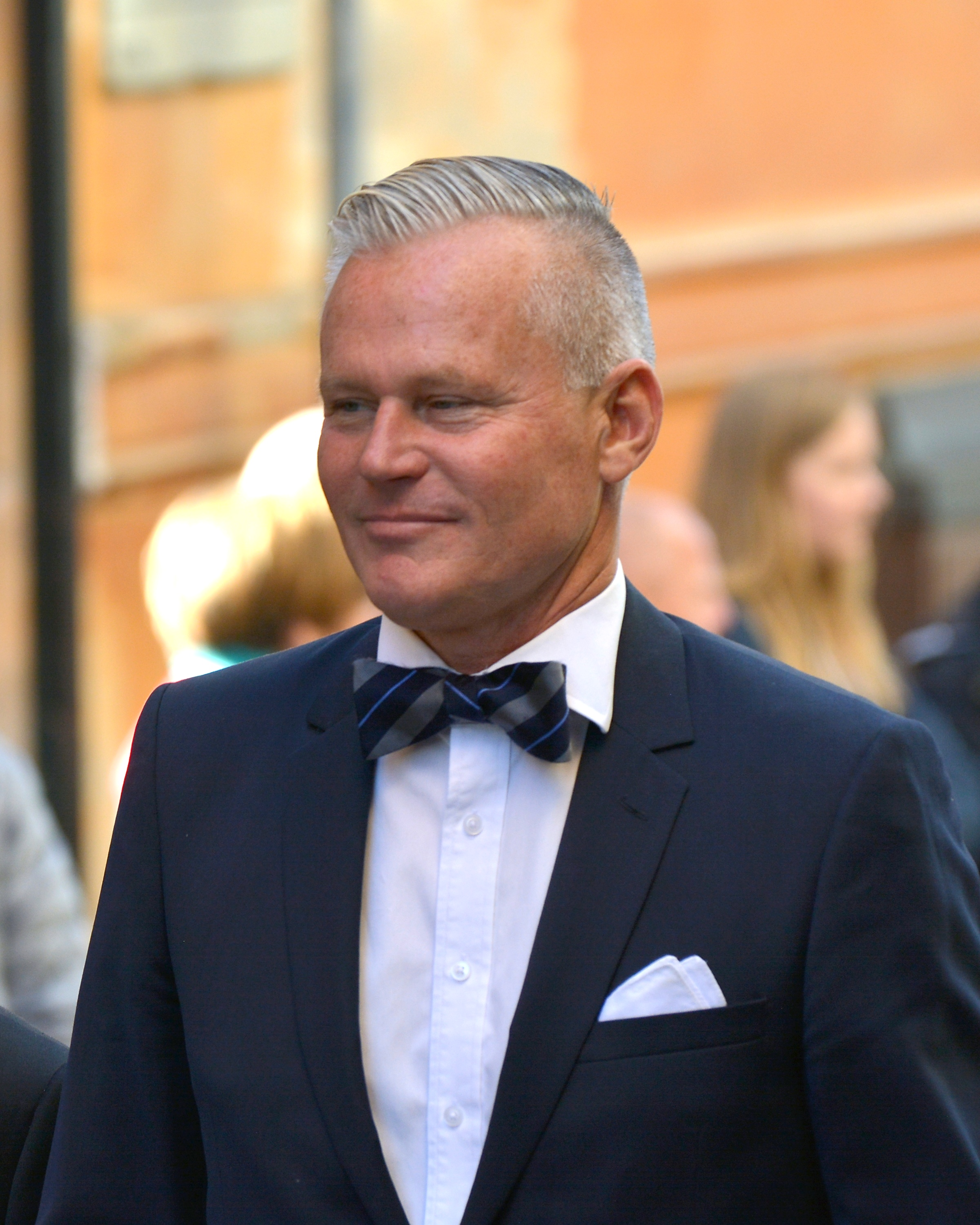
- Ekström in September 2014

Member of the Riksdag
- Incumbent
- Assumed office 4 October 2010
- Constituency: Södermanland County

Personal details
- Born: Hans Reinhold Ekström; 1958 (age 67–68)
- Party: Social Democratic Party

Hans Reinhold Ekström (born 1958) is a Swedish politician, teacher and member of the Riksdag, the national legislature. A member of the Social Democratic Party, he has represented Södermanland County since October 2010.

Ekström is the son of industrial official Carl-Axel Ekström and museum expert Gun Ekström (née Holmgren). He was educated in Eskilstuna and has a teaching degree. He was teacher in Eskilstuna Municipality from 1982 to 1992. He was a member of the municipal council in Eskilstuna Municipality from 1988 to 2010. He has been a member of the county administrative board in Södermanland County since 1995.
