= Martina Johansson =

Swedish politician (born 1975)

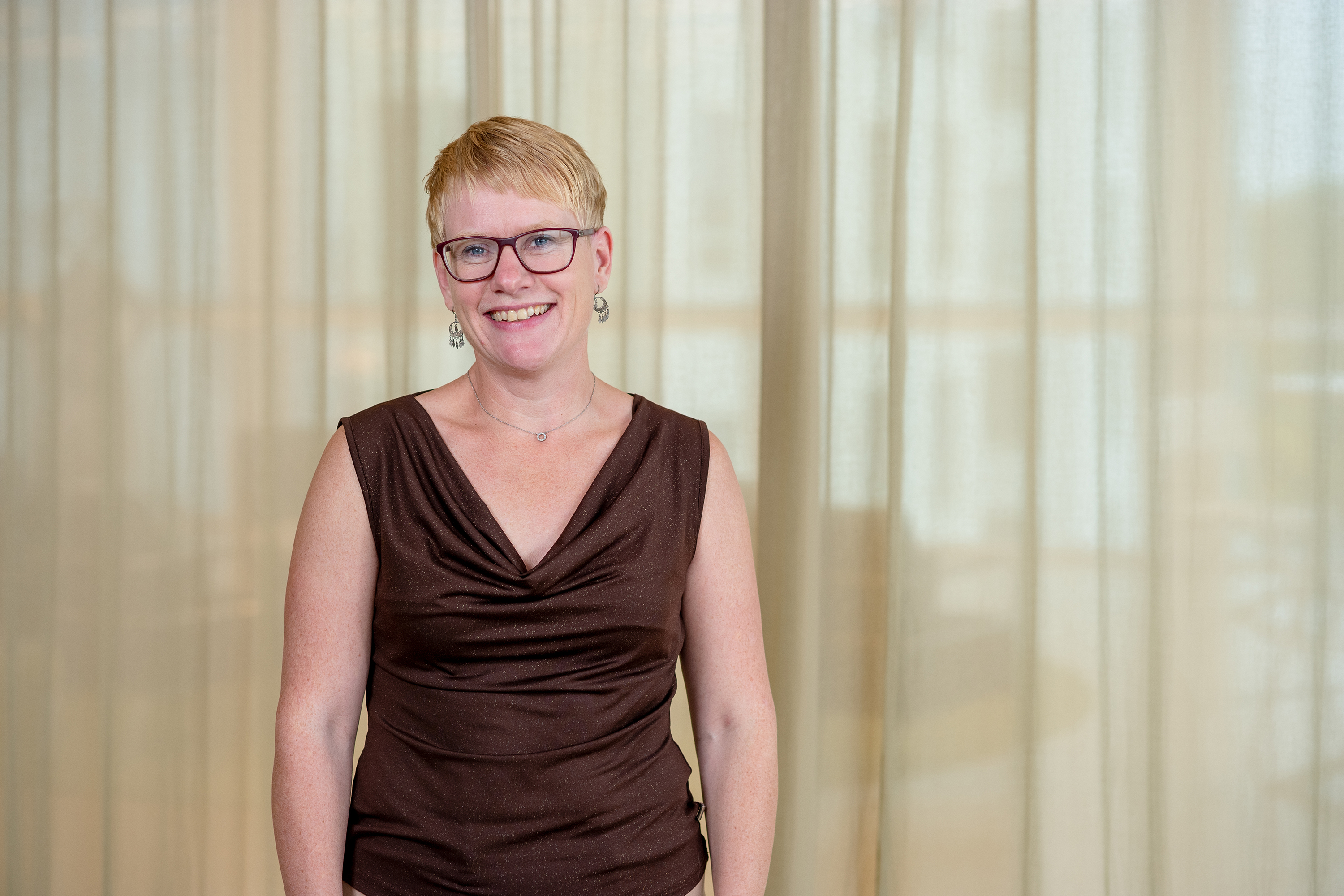
- Johansson in 2019

Member of the Riksdag
- Incumbent
- Assumed office 24 September 2018
- Constituency: Södermanland County

Personal details
- Born: 1975 (age 50–51)
- Party: Centre Party

Martina Johansson (born 1975) is a Swedish politician. Since September 2018, she serves as Member of the Riksdag representing the constituency of Södermanland County. She was also elected as Member of the Riksdag in September 2022. She is affiliated with the Centre Party.
