= Caroline Helmersson Olsson =

Swedish politician (born 1963)

Caroline Helmersson Olsson S
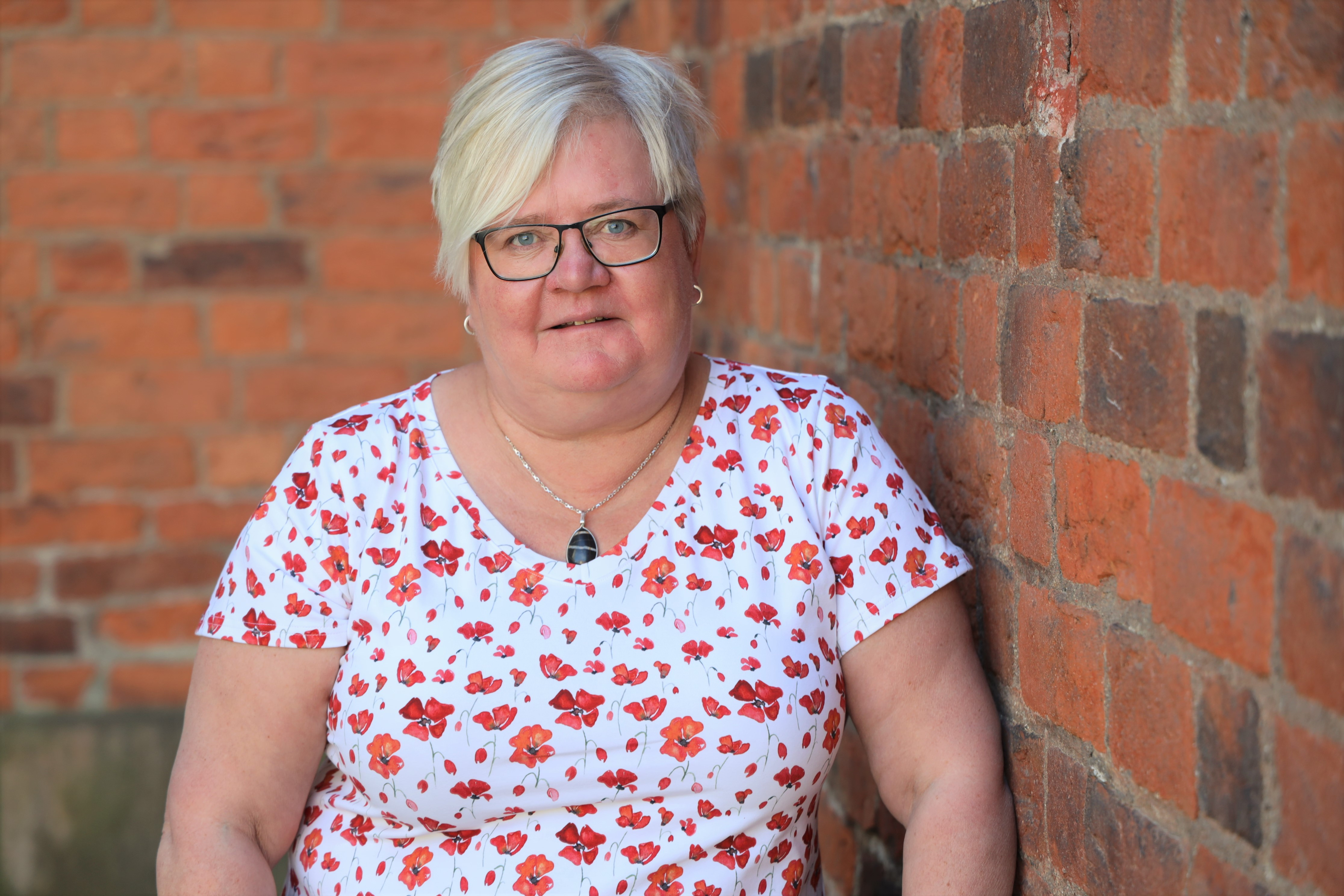
- Caroline Helmersson Olsson's official portrait Picture: Sveriges riksdag

Member of the Swedish Parliament for Södermanland County
- Incumbent
- Assumed office 1 May 2007

Personal details
- Born: 1963 (age 62–63) Eslöv
- Party: Social Democrats
- Parents: Harald Olsson; Barbro Lövgren (née Karlsson)
- Occupation: Politician, ombudsman, unlicensed assistive personnel

Caroline Helmersson-Olsson (born 1963) is a Swedish Social Democratic Party politician. She has been a member of the Riksdag since 2007.
