= Maria Forsberg =

Swedish politician (born 1974)

Member of the Riksdag
- Incumbent
- Assumed office 28 September 2026
- Constituency: Södermanland County

Personal details
- Born: 1974 (age 51–52)
- Party: Left Party

Maria Elisabet Forsberg (born 1974) is a Swedish politician for the Left Party. She has been a member of the Riksdag since 2026, elected for the Södermanland County constituency. Since 2025, she has been the party secretary of the Left Party.

== Biography ==
Forsberg has worked as a high school teacher for many years. She has held municipal political assignments for the Left Party in Eskilstuna Municipality since the 2000s.

She has been a member of the Left Party's party board and the Left Party's executive committee since 2022. From the autumn of 2024, she was deputy party secretary, before becoming party secretary in February 2025.

== See also ==
- List of members of the Riksdag, 2026–2030
