= Paul Sabo =

Swedish politician (born 2001)

Member of the Riksdag
- Incumbent
- Assumed office 28 September 2026
- Constituency: Södermanland County

Personal details
- Born: 6 January 2001 (age 25)
- Party: Christian Democrats

Paul Dan Zette Sabo (born 6 January 2001) is a Swedish politician who was elected member of the Riksdag in 2026. He has served as group leader of the Christian Democrats in the municipal council of Eskilstuna since 2023.
