= Åsa Kullgren =

Swedish politician (born 1971)

Member of the Riksdag
- Incumbent
- Assumed office 20 October 2026
- Preceded by: Jimmy Jansson
- Constituency: Södermanland County

Personal details
- Born: 26 November 1971 (age 54) Stafsinge, Sweden
- Party: Social Democratic Party
- Education: Lund University

Åsa Ulrika Kullgren (born 26 November 1971) is a Swedish politician and Member of the Riksdag. A member of the Social Democratic Party, she has represented Södermanland County since October 2026.

Kullgren was born on 26 November 1971 in Stafsinge. She has a law degree from Lund University (1995). She worked as a legal counsel to the Swedish Higher Education Authority (UKA) before becoming a public prosecutor. She was Deputy Chief Prosecutor in Örebro. She has led the government inquiries into the pharmacy market and crisis preparedness in the healthcare system.

Kullgren was chair of the Social Democratic Students of Sweden from 1995 to 1997. She was chair of the Social Democratic Party in Eskilstuna Municipality and Eskilstuna energi och miljö, a municipally owned utility company. She was chair of the county council board (landstingsstyrelsen) in Södermanland County from 2010 to 2015. She has held various roles in the Swedish Association of Local Authorities and Regions (SKL) and served on the board of the First Swedish National Pension Fund. She was appointed to the Riksdag in October 2026 following the resignation of Jimmy Jansson.
