= Anna af Sillén =

Swedish politician (born 1976)

Member of the Riksdag
- Incumbent
- Assumed office 18 October 2022
- Preceded by: Ulf Kristersson
- Constituency: Södermanland County

Personal details
- Born: 17 January 1976 (age 50) Södermanland County, Sweden
- Party: Moderate Party

Anna Margaretha Hansdotter af Sillén (born 17 January 1976) is a Swedish politician from the Moderate Party. She is a member of the Riksdag.

== See also ==
- List of members of the Riksdag, 2022–2026
- List of members of the Riksdag, 2026–2030
