= Reynoldh Furustrand =

Swedish politician (born 1942)

Member of the Riksdag
- In office 8 October 1986 – 2 October 2006
- Preceded by: Svante Lundkvist
- Constituency: Södermanland County

Member of the European Parliament
- In office 1 January 1995 – 8 October 1995
- Constituency: Sweden

Personal details
- Born: 8 April 1942 (age 84) Jönköping, Sweden
- Party: Social Democratic Party
- Other political affiliations: Group of the Party of European Socialists

Reynold Karl Axel Furustrand (born 8 April 1942) is a Swedish politician and former member of the Riksdag, the national legislature. A member of the Social Democratic Party, he represented Södermanland County between October 1986 and October 2006. He was a member of the European Parliament between January 1995 and October 1995. He was a member of the municipal council in Eskilstuna Municipality from 1976 to 1979.
