= Elisa Abascal Reyes =

Swedish politician (born 1973)

Member of the Riksdag
- In office 1994–1998
- Constituency: Södermanland County

Personal details
- Born: 1973 (age 51–52) Chile
- Political party: Green Party

Elisa Abascal Reyes (born 1973), is a Swedish former politician for the Green Party, who served as a member of the Riksdag for Södermanland County from 1994 to 1998. Her choice not to run for a second term coincided with that of two other single-term female members of the Riksdag, Annika Nordgren and Hanna Zetterberg. This attracted some attention from newspapers at the time.

In June 1992 she participated in a protest against the JAS project on the premises of Saab in Linköping, resulting in a conviction and fines.
