= Marco Venegas =

Swedish politician (born 1962)

Member of the Riksdag
- In office 29 September 2014 – 24 September 2018
- Constituency: Södermanland County

Personal details
- Born: Marco Antonio Venegas Astudillo; 1962 (age 63–64)
- Party: Green Party
- Education: Stockholm University

Marco Antonio Venegas Astudillo (born 1962) is a Swedish politician and former member of the Riksdag, the national legislature. A member of the Green Party, he represented Södermanland County between September 2014 and September 2018.

Venegas is the son of metalworker Mario Venegas and Yolanda Astudillo. He was educated in Santiago in Chile and at a Komvux in Nyköping. He has a degree in sociology from Stockholm University. He was a mental health worker in Nyköping (1987-1989); social secretary in Nyköping Municipality (1993-1995); aid worker in El Salvador (1996-1998); probation officer in Chile (1998-2000); and a social worker in Nyköping Municipality (2000-2014). He was a member of the municipal council in Nyköping Municipality between 1994 and 1995; between 2002 and 2006; and between 2010 and 2014. He was a member of the county council in Södermanland County from 2002 to 2010.
