= Adam Marttinen =

Swedish politician (born 1983)

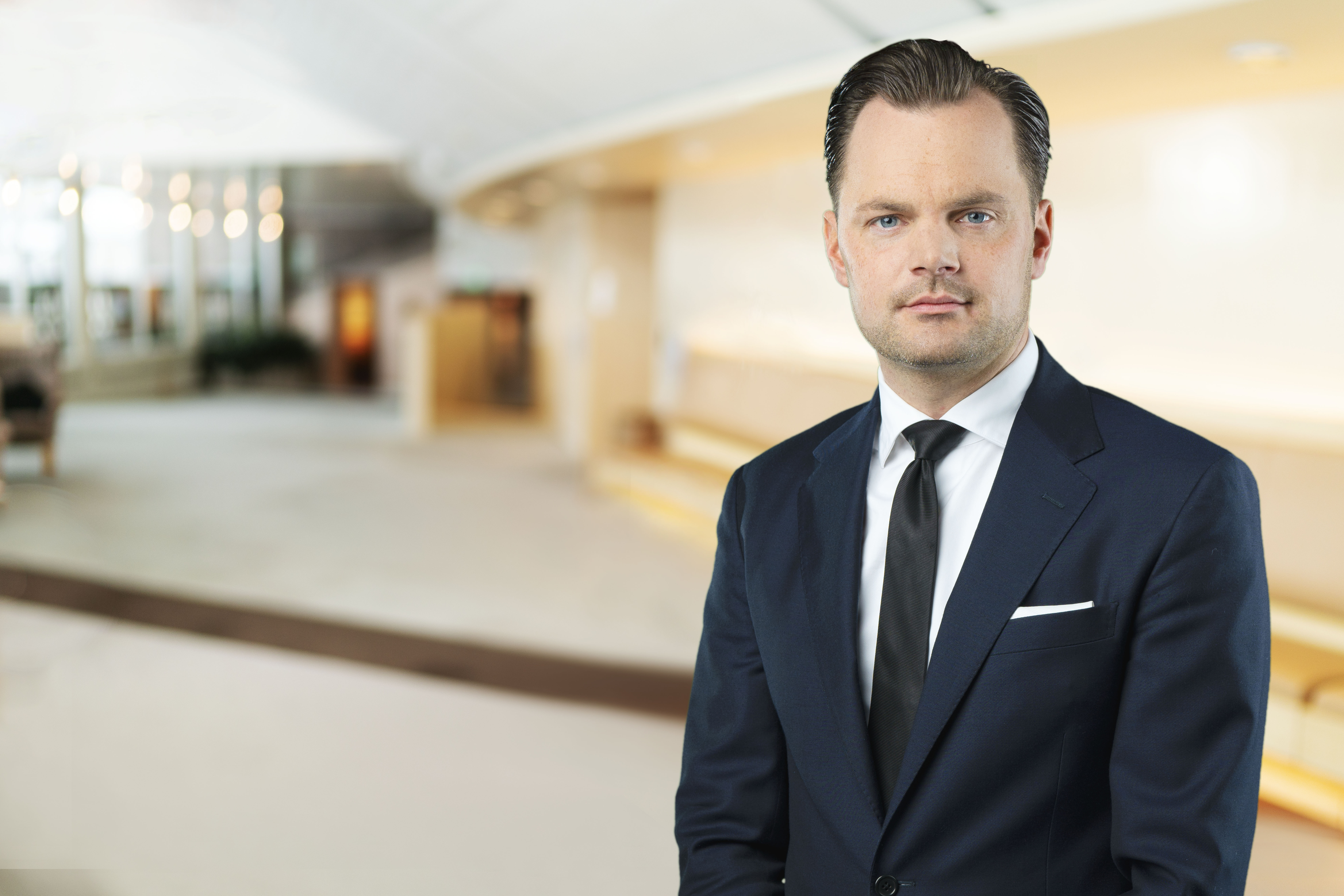

Member of the Riksdag
- Incumbent
- Assumed office 2014
- Constituency: Stockholm County (2014-2018)
- Constituency: Södermanland County (2018-)

Personal details
- Born: 19 September 1983 (age 43) Eskilstuna
- Party: Sweden Democrats

Adam Erik Marttinen (born 19 October 1983) is a Swedish politician of the Sweden Democrats party who is a member of the Riksdag.

Marttinen was born in Eskilstuna and is of Finnish descent. He was first elected to the Riksdag in 2014 and again in 2018 for the Södermanland County constituency. He is also a councilor for the Sweden Democrats in Eskilstuna and is the party group leader on the council. Marttinen sits on the Committee on Justice in parliament and has described counteracting segregation and reforming criminal policy as matters that he focuses on.
