= Michael Hagberg =

Swedish politician (born 1954)

member of the Riksdag
- In office 1994–2010

Representative of the Parliamentary Assembly of the Council of Europe
- In office 2005–2007

Personal details
- Born: 1954
- Political party: Social Democratic

Michael Hagberg (born 1954) is a Swedish Social Democratic politician who was a member of the Riksdag from 1994 to 2010.
