= Sara Karlsson =

Swedish politician (born 1985)

Member of the Riksdag
- In office 4 October 2010 – 14 May 2018
- Constituency: Södermanland County

Personal details
- Born: 1985 (age 40–41)
- Party: Social Democrats

Sara Karlsson (born 1985) is a Swedish politician. She served as member of the Riksdag from 4 October 2010 to 14 May 2018, representing the constituency of Södermanland County.
