= National Organisation for Women's Shelters and Young Women's Shelters in Sweden =

Umbrella group of Swedish women's shelters

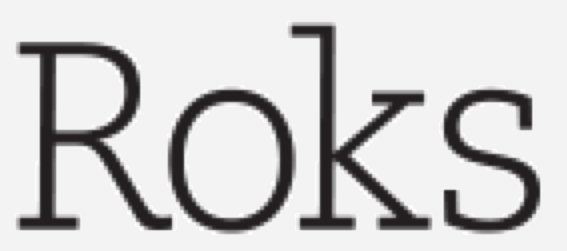
Logo of Roks (Riksorganisationen för kvinnojourer och tjejjourer i Sverige)

The National Organisation for Women's Shelters and Young Women's Shelters in Sweden (Swedish: Riksorganisationen för kvinnojourer och tjejjourer i Sverige; ROKS) is an umbrella organization for around hundred women's shelters in Sweden. It was founded in 1984, and is traditionally known for its radical feminist and separatist ideological position. The organization actively participates in public debate in its area.

In 2005, the Swedish documentary The Gender War led to significant discussion of ROKS and its ideology, and resulted in its then-chair Ireen von Wachenfeldt leaving her position after stating that "men are animals."

The organization has said that it "is important for us that we serve all those who identity as women and girls." In 2018, the organization cancelled a planned talk by Kajsa Ekis Ekman, stating that her views on trans people are incompatible with Roks' mission to serve all girls and women.
