= Birger Schlaug =

Swedish author (born 1949)

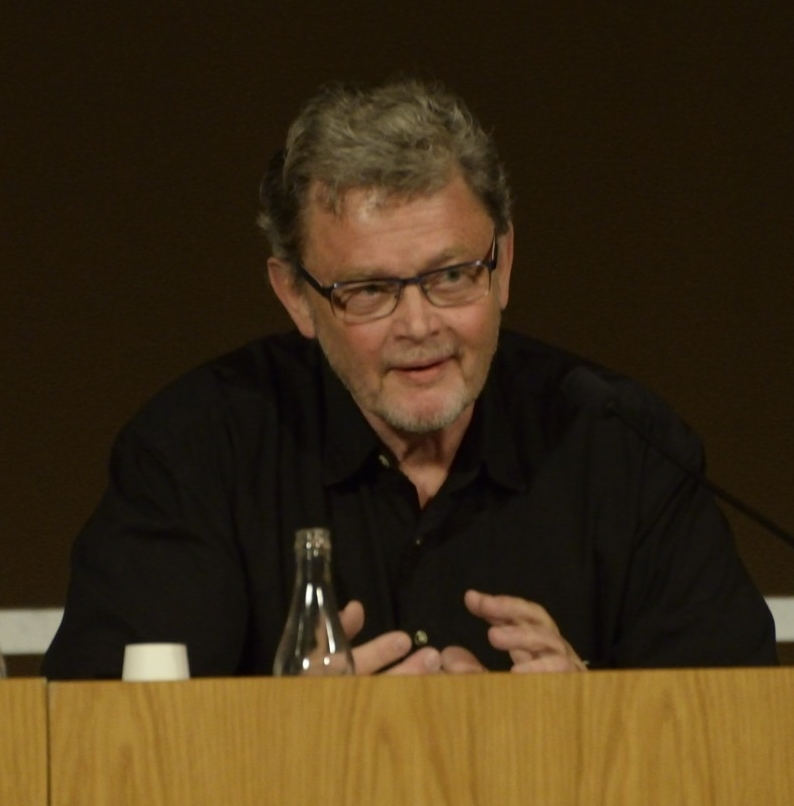
Birger Schlaug

Axel Birger Schlaug (born 29 January 1949 in Stockholm) is a Swedish author, public speaker, blogger and former spokesperson for the Swedish Green Party, Miljöpartiet.

Schlaug was a member of the Riksdag from 1994 to 2001.

== Bibliography ==
- Berättelsen om Emily från Xinjiang (e-book) (in Swedish).
- Gud älskar att färdas i en rosa Cadillac, en roman om Elvis, rock'n'roll och livet som var (in Swedish). Rimbo: Fischer & Co. 2006. ISBN 978-91-85183-27-2.
- Svarta oliver och gröna drömmar (in Swedish). Stockholm: Norstedts förlag. 1997. ISBN 91-1-971892-6.
- "Kretsloppsekonomi – ekonomi för en hållbar utveckling". Rapport/Miljöpartiet De gröna (in Swedish). No. 4. with Marianne Samuelsson. Stockholm. 1993. ISSN 1103-5145.
- "Regeringen och miljön". Rapport/Miljöpartiet De gröna (in Swedish). No. 2. Karin Jönsson. Stockholm. 1994. ISSN 1103-5145.
- "Norden – det naturliga steget inför 2000-talet". Rapport/Miljöpartiet De gröna (in Swedish). No. 3. Marianne Samuelsson. Stockholm. 1993. ISSN 1103-5145.
- "Unionen och miljön". Rapport/Miljöpartiet De gröna (in Swedish). No. 1. with Marianne Samuelsson. Stockholm. 1993. ISSN 1103-5145.
- "24 konkreta miljökrav redovisade inför EES-utskottet den 21 augusti 1992". Rapport/Miljöpartiet De gröna (in Swedish). No. 6. with Marianne Samuelsson. Stockholm. 1992. ISSN 1103-5145.
- "Sverige som modelland – 10 principer för en hållbar utveckling". Rapport/Miljöpartiet De gröna (in Swedish). No. 2. Marianne Samuelsson. Stockholm. 1992. ISSN 1103-5145.
- "Elva steg för en robust ekonomi". Rapport/Miljöpartiet De gröna (in Swedish). No. 4. Marianne Samuelsson. Stockholm. 1992. ISSN 1103-5145.
- Miljön, makten och friheten. Studieplan (in Swedish). Lund: Gröna böcker. 1990. ISBN 9789178430307.
- Miljön, makten och friheten (in Swedish). Stockholm: Gidlunds förlag. 1990. ISBN 9789178430307.
