= Fredrik Olovsson =

Swedish politician (born 1973)

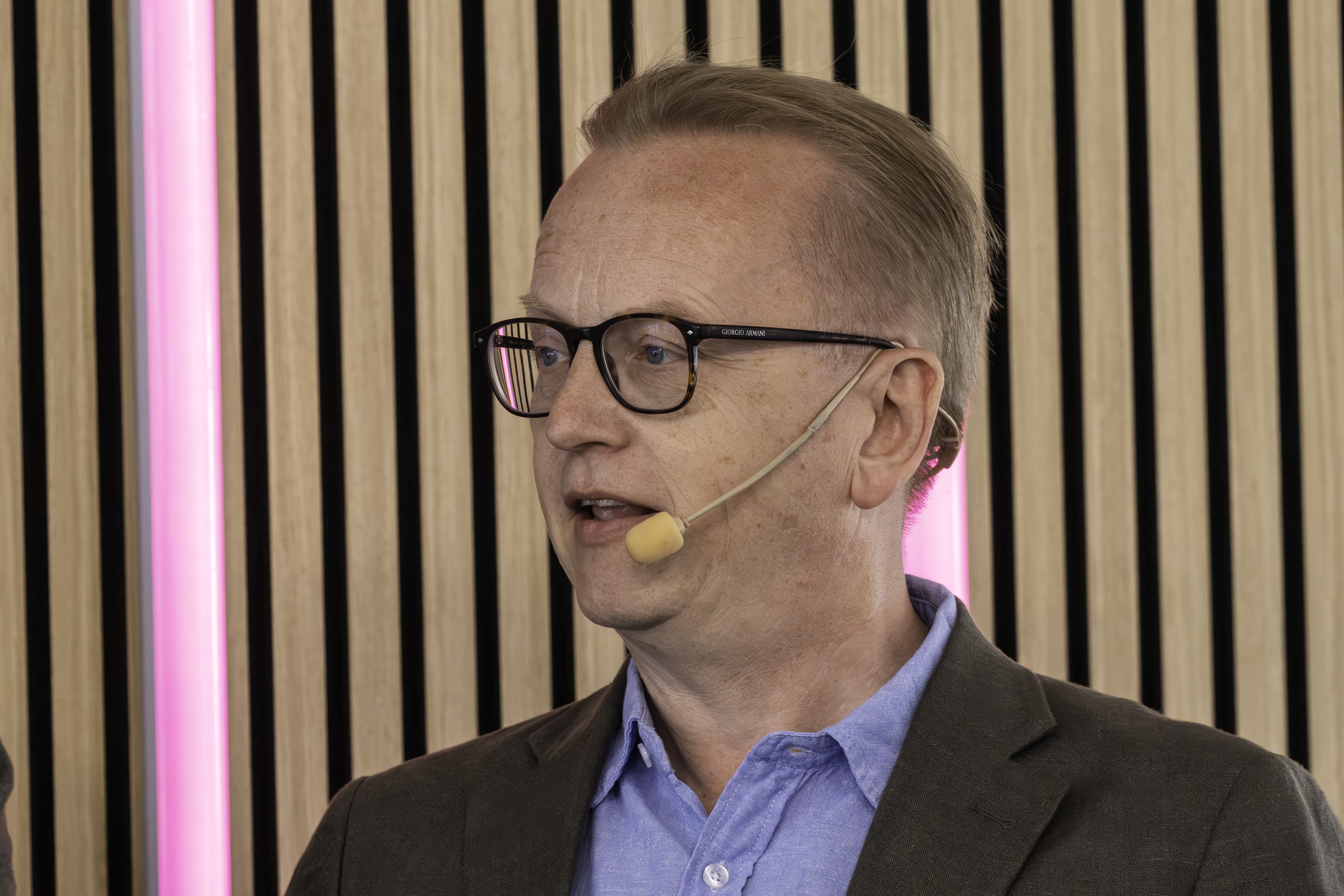

member of the Riksdag
- Incumbent
- Assumed office 2002

Personal details
- Born: 24 May 1973 (age 53) Katrineholm, Sweden
- Party: Social Democratic

Fredrik Olovsson (born 24 May 1973) is a Swedish Social Democratic politician who has been a member of the Riksdag since 2002.
