= Laila Bjurling =

Swedish politician (born 1947)

Laila Bjurling (born 1947) is a Swedish Social Democratic politician who has been a member of the Riksdag since 1995.
