= Dalarna County (Riksdag constituency) =

Constituency of the Riksdag, the national legislature of Sweden

- Dalarnas Län
- Constituency for the Riksdag
- Location of Dalarna County within Sweden
- County: Dalarna
- Population: 286,048 (2025)
- Electorate: 223,713 (2026)
- Area: 30,377 km^{2} (2026)

Current constituency
- Created: 1970
- Seats: List (Note: Constituency seats only.): 9 (2014–present); 10 (1998–2014); 11 (1970–1998)
- Member of the Riksdag: List: Mohamed Ali (V); Mathias Bengtsson (KD); Crister Carlsson (M); Liselotte Forsberg (SD); Rasmus Giertz (SD); Peter Hultqvist (S); Mursal Isa (MP); Lars Isacsson (S); Ulrika Liljeberg (C); Marie Olsson (S); Katarina Stenström Ros (M)
- Created from: Kopparberg County

Dalarna County (Swedish: Dalarnas Län) is one of the 29 multi-member constituencies of the Riksdag, the national legislature of Sweden. The constituency was established as Kopparberg County in 1970 when the Riksdag changed from a bicameral legislature to a unicameral legislature. It was renamed Dalarna County in 1998. It is conterminous with the county of Dalarna. The constituency currently elects nine of the 349 members of the Riksdag using the open party-list proportional representation electoral system. At the 2026 general election it had 223,713 registered electors.

== Electoral system ==
Dalarna County currently elects nine of the 349 members of the Riksdag using the open party-list proportional representation electoral system. Constituency seats are allocated using the modified Sainte-Laguë method. Only parties that reach the 4% national threshold and parties that receive at least 12% of the vote in the constituency compete for constituency seats. Supplementary levelling seats may also be allocated at the constituency level to parties that reach the 4% national threshold.

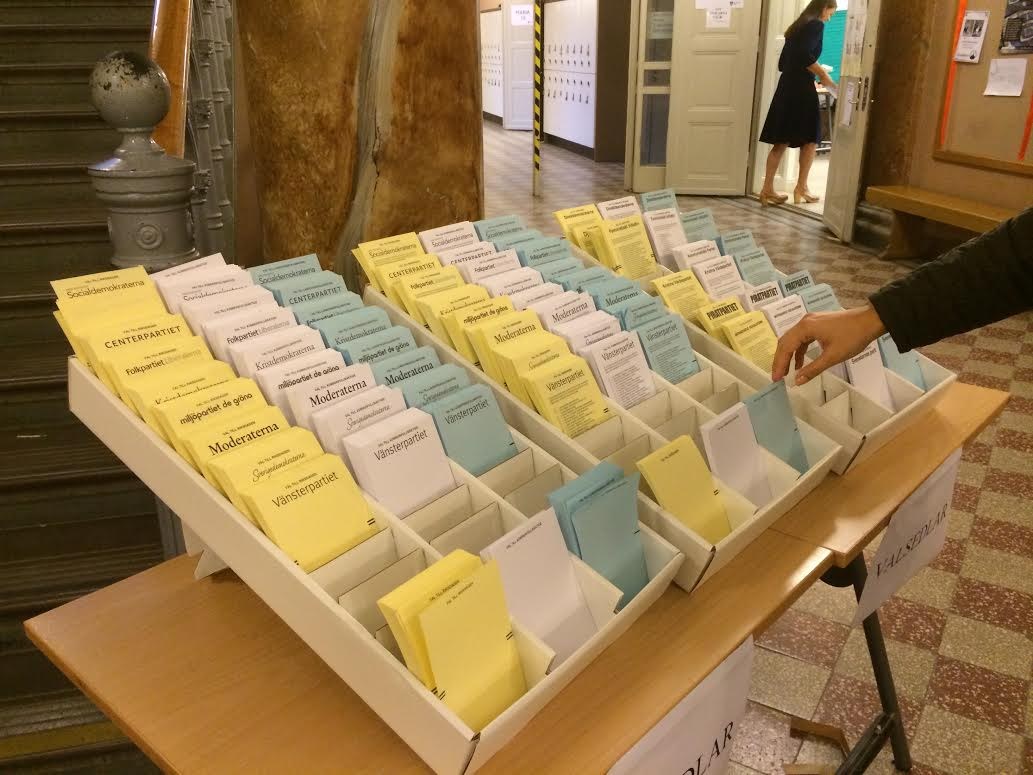
A selection of ballot papers available for voters at the 2014 general election in Stockholm - yellow for the Riksdag, blue for the regional council and white for the municipal council

Prior to 1997 voters could cast any ballot paper they wanted, though it had to contain the name of a party and the name of at least one candidate nominated by that party in the constituency. It was common for parties to hand out ballot papers with their name and list of candidates at the entrance of polling stations. Voters could delete the names of candidates or write-in the names of other candidates but in practice these options weren't used enough by voters to have any significant impact on the results and consequently elections operated as a closed system.

Since 1997, elections in Sweden follow the French model in having separate ballot papers for each party/list in a constituency. There are two ballot papers for each party - a party ballot paper (partivalsedel) with just the name of the party and a name ballot paper (namnvalsedel) with the name of the party and its list of candidates. There are also blank ballot papers (blank valsedel). Voters can initially pick as many ballot papers as they wish and then, in the secrecy of the voting booth, they select a single ballot paper of their choice. If they chose a name ballot paper they have the option of casting a preferential vote for one of their chosen party's candidates. If they chose a blank ballot paper they can write the name of any party including unregistered parties and, optionally, they can write the name of any person as their preferred candidate, even one that does not belong to their chosen party. They then place their chosen ballot paper in an envelope which is placed in the ballot box, discarding all other ballot papers they picked.

Seats won by each party/list in a constituency are allocated to its candidates in order of preference votes (a personal mandate), provided that the candidate has received at least 8% of votes cast for their party in the constituency (5% since January 2011). Any unfilled seats are then allocated to the party's remaining candidates in the order they appear on the party list (a party mandate).

== Election results ==
=== Summary ===
Election	Left V / VPK			Social Democrats S			Greens MP			Centre C			Liberals L / FP / F			Moderates M			Christian Democrats KD / KDS			Sweden Democrats SD		
Election	Votes	%	Seats	Votes	%	Seats	Votes	%	Seats	Votes	%	Seats	Votes	%	Seats	Votes	%	Seats	Votes	%	Seats	Votes	%	Seats
2026	10,814	5.76%	0	55,451	29.52%	3	8,913	4.74%	0	12,200	6.49%	1	7,579	4.03%	0	34,477	18.35%	2	13,294	7.08%	1	41,863	22.29%	2
2022	9,937	5.33%	0	59,080	31.66%	3	7,087	3.80%	0	12,131	6.50%	1	5,786	3.10%	0	30,664	16.43%	2	11,231	6.02%	0	47,931	25.69%	3
2018	13,654	7.26%	1	57,776	30.73%	3	6,249	3.32%	0	18,813	10.01%	1	6,848	3.64%	0	31,320	16.66%	2	11,522	6.13%	0	39,029	20.76%	2
2014	10,672	5.77%	0	65,543	35.45%	4	9,352	5.06%	0	14,371	7.77%	1	6,350	3.43%	0	35,087	18.98%	2	6,427	3.48%	0	31,043	16.79%	2
2010	10,533	5.88%	0	67,139	37.47%	4	10,652	5.95%	1	14,086	7.86%	1	8,747	4.88%	0	44,997	25.11%	3	7,925	4.42%	0	12,470	6.96%	1
2006	11,251	6.65%	1	68,218	40.34%	5	7,361	4.35%	0	18,197	10.76%	1	8,681	5.13%	0	35,615	21.06%	3	9,159	5.42%	0	4,723	2.79%	0
2002	15,482	9.50%	1	71,364	43.78%	5	7,599	4.66%	0	16,093	9.87%	1	15,880	9.74%	1	18,862	11.57%	1	12,506	7.67%	1	1,793	1.10%	0
1998	25,118	14.80%	2	66,696	39.29%	4	8,636	5.09%	0	10,908	6.43%	1	5,731	3.38%	0	28,691	16.90%	2	19,373	11.41%	1			
1994	12,813	6.96%	1	91,037	49.46%	6	11,022	5.99%	1	18,564	10.09%	1	10,710	5.82%	0	29,757	16.17%	2	6,868	3.73%	0			
1991	8,567	4.68%	0	76,566	41.82%	5	5,986	3.27%	0	21,297	11.63%	1	13,504	7.38%	1	29,372	16.04%	2	12,371	6.76%	1			
1988	10,802	6.00%	1	84,653	47.00%	6	10,286	5.71%	0	26,945	14.96%	2	18,917	10.50%	1	22,265	12.36%	1	5,626	3.12%	0			
1985	9,965	5.21%	0	92,860	48.53%	6	3,610	1.89%	0	31,216	16.31%	2	22,542	11.78%	1	30,610	16.00%	2	with C					
1982	9,611	4.95%	0	97,316	50.10%	6	3,658	1.88%	0	38,674	19.91%	3	8,473	4.36%	0	32,969	16.97%	2	3,263	1.68%	0			
1979	9,751	5.13%	0	90,475	47.64%	5				45,537	23.98%	3	14,075	7.41%	1	25,986	13.68%	2	2,896	1.52%	0			
1976	8,038	4.25%	0	87,669	46.32%	5				57,205	30.22%	4	15,425	8.15%	1	17,604	9.30%	1	2,698	1.43%	0			
1973	8,813	4.95%	0	83,642	46.96%	5				56,031	31.46%	4	11,645	6.54%	1	14,089	7.91%	1	3,123	1.75%	0			
1970	8,414	4.86%	0	84,858	48.98%	6				46,290	26.72%	3	18,706	10.80%	1	11,457	6.61%	1	3,136	1.81%	0			

(Excludes levelling seats. Figures in italics represent alliances/joint lists.)

=== Detailed ===
Party has received at least 4% of the vote nationally and is entitled to compete for constituency seats.

==== 2020s ====
===== 2026 =====
Results of the 2026 general election held on 13 September 2026:

Party		Votes per municipality															Total votes	%	Seats		
Party		Älv- dalen	Avesta	Bor- länge	Falun	Gagnef	Hede- mora	Lek- sand	Lud- vika	Malung- Sälen	Mora	Orsa	Rättvik	Säter	Smedje- backen	Vans- bro	Total votes	%	Con.	Lev.	Tot.
Swedish Social Democratic Party	S	1,133	4,643	10,840	11,782	1,736	2,720	2,982	5,233	1,696	3,736	1,168	2,014	2,153	2,484	1,131	55,451	29.52%	3	0	3
Sweden Democrats	SD	1,468	3,526	6,823	6,623	1,686	2,421	2,038	3,975	1,849	3,437	1,265	1,913	1,805	1,903	1,131	41,863	22.29%	2	0	2
Moderate Party	M	620	2,700	5,903	7,956	1,136	1,652	2,221	2,721	1,468	2,532	705	1,492	1,426	1,261	684	34,477	18.35%	2	0	2
Christian Democrats	KD	419	853	1,683	2,755	700	717	1,124	914	616	1,045	329	642	580	396	521	13,294	7.08%	1	0	1
Centre Party	C	346	713	1,698	3,386	542	608	945	760	334	917	303	504	566	290	288	12,200	6.49%	1	0	1
Left Party	V	151	900	2,518	2,414	272	556	528	1,197	235	603	288	263	344	326	219	10,814	5.76%	0	1	1
Green Party	MP	124	380	1,498	3,131	333	415	606	529	156	578	204	352	299	213	95	8,913	4.74%	0	1	1
Liberals	L	155	518	1,279	1,849	285	323	556	508	286	635	201	309	300	241	134	7,579	4.03%	0	0	0
Örebro Party	ÖP	18	70	298	242	51	99	56	147	23	79	55	54	51	74	45	1,362	0.73%	0	0	0
Alternative for Sweden	AfS	15	41	117	123	26	53	32	80	20	66	34	39	24	40	20	730	0.39%	0	0	0
Ambition Sweden	AS	18	22	39	67	9	33	24	17	19	28	29	22	9	8	9	353	0.19%	0	0	0
Christian Values Party	KrVP	5	19	21	41	5	15	14	13	6	5	9	13	5	0	19	190	0.10%	0	0	0
Pirate Party	PP	5	19	47	28	5	5	3	22	4	10	8	2	4	2	1	165	0.09%	0	0	0
Citizens' Coalition	MED	2	25	20	19	2	6	9	9	3	6	4	5	14	4	0	128	0.07%	0	0	0
Human Rights and Democracy	MoD	1	5	26	33	9	6	3	4	0	12	8	5	2	3	1	118	0.06%	0	0	0
Communist Party of Sweden	SKP	3	3	7	16	5	1	4	3	4	2	0	1	2	1	2	54	0.03%	0	0	0
RegleraAI.nu		0	0	22	8	1	0	0	1	0	0	0	2	2	2	0	38	0.02%	0	0	0
Nordic Resistance Movement	NMR	1	1	2	1	0	1	0	10	1	2	0	0	3	0	1	23	0.01%	0	0	0
Direct Democrats	DD	1	4	5	7	0	1	0	1	0	2	0	0	0	0	0	21	0.01%	0	0	0
Independent Rural Party	LPo	0	0	1	0	3	2	1	0	2	1	0	2	1	2	0	15	0.01%	0	0	0
United Voice	ER	0	1	5	5	1	0	1	0	0	0	0	0	0	0	0	13	0.01%	0	0	0
The Push Buttons	Kn	0	0	5	1	0	0	0	0	0	0	1	1	0	2	1	11	0.01%	0	0	0
Donald Duck Party		0	1	3	2	0	0	0	0	0	0	0	0	0	0	0	6	0.00%	0	0	0
Unity	ENH	1	0	1	0	0	1	0	0	0	1	0	0	0	0	2	6	0.00%	0	0	0
Nuance Party	PNy	0	0	2	1	0	0	0	0	1	0	0	0	0	1	0	5	0.00%	0	0	0
Party for Justice and Equality	PRJ	0	0	0	2	0	0	0	0	0	2	0	0	0	0	0	4	0.00%	0	0	0
Communist Party	K	0	1	2	0	0	0	0	0	0	0	0	0	0	0	0	3	0.00%	0	0	0
NY Reform	NR	0	0	2	0	0	0	0	0	0	0	0	0	0	0	0	2	0.00%	0	0	0
Turning Point Party	PV	0	0	0	1	0	0	1	0	0	0	0	0	0	0	0	2	0.00%	0	0	0
United Sweden		0	0	0	0	0	0	0	0	0	0	0	2	0	0	0	2	0.00%	0	0	0
A Good Sweden		0	0	0	0	0	0	0	0	0	0	0	0	0	1	0	1	0.00%	0	0	0
Anti-Authoritarian Action Party		0	0	0	1	0	0	0	0	0	0	0	0	0	0	0	1	0.00%	0	0	0
Classical Liberal Party	KLP	0	0	1	0	0	0	0	0	0	0	0	0	0	0	0	1	0.00%	0	0	0
Forest People		0	0	0	0	0	1	0	0	0	0	0	0	0	0	0	1	0.00%	0	0	0
Pax		0	0	0	0	0	0	1	0	0	0	0	0	0	0	0	1	0.00%	0	0	0
Pensioners' Party		0	1	0	0	0	0	0	0	0	0	0	0	0	0	0	1	0.00%	0	0	0
Space Rockets		0	0	0	0	0	0	1	0	0	0	0	0	0	0	0	1	0.00%	0	0	0
Volt Sweden	Volt	0	0	0	0	0	0	0	0	0	0	1	0	0	0	0	1	0.00%	0	0	0
Valid votes		4,486	14,446	32,868	40,494	6,807	9,636	11,150	16,144	6,723	13,699	4,612	7,637	7,590	7,254	4,304	187,850	100.00%	9	2	11
Blank votes		62	153	337	392	95	122	111	201	99	148	54	108	102	93	68	2,145	1.13%			
Rejected votes – unregistered parties		0	2	10	5	2	3	5	2	0	1	4	1	0	0	1	36	0.02%			
Rejected votes – other		3	12	26	21	9	16	7	12	2	6	3	4	8	7	3	139	0.07%			
Total polled		4,551	14,613	33,241	40,912	6,913	9,777	11,273	16,359	6,824	13,854	4,673	7,750	7,700	7,354	4,376	190,170	85.01%			
Registered electors		5,399	17,400	39,713	46,903	8,023	11,836	12,907	19,689	7,999	16,334	5,614	9,091	8,830	8,643	5,332	223,713				
Turnout		84.29%	83.98%	83.70%	87.23%	86.16%	82.60%	87.34%	83.09%	85.31%	84.82%	83.24%	85.25%	87.20%	85.09%	82.07%	85.01%				

The following candidates were elected:

- Constituency seats (personal mandates) - Carl-Oskar Bohlin (M), 2,793 votes; and Peter Hultqvist (S), 3,223 votes.
- Constituency seats (party mandates) - Mathias Bengtsson (KD), 533 votes; Crister Carlsson (M), 482 votes; Liselotte Forsberg (SD), 147 votes; Rasmus Giertz (SD), 120 votes; Lars Isacsson (S), 1,572 votes; Ulrika Liljeberg (C), 520 votes; Marie Olsson (S), 538 votes;
- Levelling seats (personal mandates) - Mohamed Ali (V), 648 votes; and Mursal Isa (MP), 511 votes.

===== 2022 =====
Results of the 2022 general election held on 11 September 2022:

Party		Votes per municipality															Total votes	%	Seats		
Party		Älv- dalen	Avesta	Bor- länge	Falun	Gagnef	Hede- mora	Lek- sand	Lud- vika	Malung- Sälen	Mora	Orsa	Rättvik	Säter	Smedje- backen	Vans- bro	Total votes	%	Con.	Lev.	Tot.
Swedish Social Democratic Party	S	1,323	5,122	10,831	12,440	1,884	2,887	3,287	5,749	1,777	4,075	1,232	2,201	2,337	2,676	1,259	59,080	31.66%	3	0	3
Sweden Democrats	SD	1,657	4,006	7,794	7,352	1,937	2,810	2,358	4,589	2,180	3,982	1,512	2,246	2,017	2,249	1,242	47,931	25.69%	3	0	3
Moderate Party	M	489	2,196	5,332	7,380	1,066	1,570	2,050	2,300	1,280	2,205	616	1,270	1,256	1,036	618	30,664	16.43%	2	0	2
Centre Party	C	304	697	1,677	3,217	574	608	875	754	368	976	299	528	594	300	360	12,131	6.50%	1	0	1
Christian Democrats	KD	370	774	1,515	2,205	627	608	889	769	440	893	304	572	494	303	468	11,231	6.02%	0	1	1
Left Party	V	162	657	1,917	2,391	339	549	567	1,006	279	596	245	281	344	393	211	9,937	5.33%	0	1	1
Green Party	MP	95	316	1,170	2,447	273	341	468	461	128	447	169	281	229	180	82	7,087	3.80%	0	0	0
Liberals	L	86	371	1,124	1,567	200	202	393	477	222	393	127	201	196	143	84	5,786	3.10%	0	0	0
Alternative for Sweden	AfS	16	35	97	106	13	41	22	47	16	45	21	25	21	19	13	537	0.29%	0	0	0
The Push Buttons	Kn	29	19	84	61	12	27	20	35	9	39	22	29	20	11	17	434	0.23%	0	0	0
Citizens' Coalition	MED	11	32	53	91	9	18	25	14	9	25	3	11	10	8	6	325	0.17%	0	0	0
Nuance Party	PNy	0	21	86	76	4	3	5	18	7	9	7	0	1	0	0	237	0.13%	0	0	0
Human Rights and Democracy	MoD	3	21	40	69	4	16	15	11	8	18	5	7	5	7	3	232	0.12%	0	0	0
Pirate Party	PP	5	21	19	56	5	11	5	17	5	16	14	7	3	9	3	196	0.11%	0	0	0
Christian Values Party	KrVP	9	13	7	41	3	22	14	11	0	6	11	6	2	2	8	155	0.08%	0	0	0
Independent Rural Party	LPo	12	0	2	3	4	13	9	2	45	1	1	4	3	11	6	116	0.06%	0	0	0
Socialist Welfare Party	S-V	34	8	6	8	1	0	1	21	0	2	0	0	2	5	4	92	0.05%	0	0	0
Feminist Initiative	FI	2	5	15	22	4	3	5	4	0	7	3	6	3	5	1	85	0.05%	0	0	0
Nordic Resistance Movement	NMR	1	3	11	2	1	1	3	25	4	2	5	0	6	1	3	68	0.04%	0	0	0
Unity	ENH	0	5	13	10	2	4	3	5	5	2	0	2	4	2	0	57	0.03%	0	0	0
Climate Alliance	KA	3	0	15	14	1	0	0	2	0	3	1	2	2	1	2	46	0.02%	0	0	0
Direct Democrats	DD	1	4	10	10	1	6	1	3	1	4	0	2	1	1	0	45	0.02%	0	0	0
Communist Party of Sweden	SKP	0	0	9	15	4	2	0	4	0	0	0	0	8	2	0	44	0.02%	0	0	0
Basic Income Party	BASIP	3	11	15	3	0	0	1	0	0	2	0	0	1	0	0	36	0.02%	0	0	0
Turning Point Party	PV	0	1	1	4	0	0	1	1	1	1	0	1	0	0	0	11	0.01%	0	0	0
Classical Liberal Party	KLP	0	3	2	1	0	0	0	0	0	0	0	0	0	0	0	6	0.00%	0	0	0
Donald Duck Party		0	1	1	1	0	0	0	0	0	1	0	1	0	0	0	5	0.00%	0	0	0
Freedom Party		0	0	0	0	0	1	0	2	1	0	0	0	0	1	0	5	0.00%	0	0	0
Sweden Out of the EU/ Free Justice Party	FRP	0	0	0	0	0	0	0	0	0	0	0	3	0	2	0	5	0.00%	0	0	0
United Democratic Party		0	0	1	0	0	0	0	0	0	0	0	0	4	0	0	5	0.00%	0	0	0
Hard Line Sweden		0	0	1	2	0	0	0	0	1	0	0	0	0	0	0	4	0.00%	0	0	0
Evil Chicken Party	OKP	0	0	0	0	0	0	1	0	0	0	0	0	0	1	0	2	0.00%	0	0	0
Freedom Movement		0	1	0	0	0	0	0	0	0	0	0	0	0	0	0	1	0.00%	0	0	0
Scania Party	SKÅ	0	0	0	0	0	0	0	0	0	1	0	0	0	0	0	1	0.00%	0	0	0
Volt Sweden	Volt	0	0	0	0	0	0	0	0	0	0	1	0	0	0	0	1	0.00%	0	0	0
Valid votes		4,615	14,343	31,848	39,594	6,968	9,743	11,018	16,327	6,786	13,751	4,598	7,686	7,563	7,368	4,390	186,598	100.00%	9	2	11
Blank votes		65	153	375	415	91	109	159	194	101	129	48	99	101	103	65	2,207	1.17%			
Rejected votes – unregistered parties		1	1	3	8	3	1	0	3	0	0	4	1	0	1	5	31	0.02%			
Rejected votes – other		3	6	25	22	8	14	6	12	9	21	0	5	8	3	1	143	0.08%			
Total polled		4,684	14,503	32,251	40,039	7,070	9,867	11,183	16,536	6,896	13,901	4,650	7,791	7,672	7,475	4,461	188,979	85.38%			
Registered electors		5,481	17,253	38,802	46,002	8,044	11,840	12,738	19,610	7,983	16,295	5,489	9,064	8,789	8,649	5,305	221,344				
Turnout		85.46%	84.06%	83.12%	87.04%	87.89%	83.34%	87.79%	84.32%	86.38%	85.31%	84.71%	85.96%	87.29%	86.43%	84.09%	85.38%				

The following candidates were elected:

- Constituency seats (personal mandates) - Carl-Oskar Bohlin (M), 2,192 votes; and Peter Hultqvist (S), 3,477 votes.
- Constituency seats (party mandates) - Anna-Lena Blomkvist (SD), 97 votes; Sofie Eriksson (S), 1,382 votes; Sara Gille (SD), 3 votes; Malin Höglund (M), 391 votes; Lars Isacsson (S), 1,423 votes; Ulrika Liljeberg (C), 595 votes; and Mats Nordberg (SD), 133 votes.
- Levelling seats (party mandates) - Mathias Bengtsson (KD), 439 votes; and Kajsa Fredholm (V), 440 votes.

Permanent substitutions:

- Mats Nordberg (SD) died on 15 January 2023 and was replaced by Rasmus Giertz (SD) on 17 January 2023.
- Sofie Eriksson (S) resigned on 15 July 2024 upon being elected to the European Parliament and was replaced by Marie Olsson (S) on 16 July 2024.

==== 2010s ====
===== 2018 =====
Results of the 2018 general election held on 9 September 2018:

Party		Votes per municipality															Total votes	%	Seats		
Party		Älv- dalen	Avesta	Bor- länge	Falun	Gagnef	Hede- mora	Lek- sand	Lud- vika	Malung- Sälen	Mora	Orsa	Rättvik	Säter	Smedje- backen	Vans- bro	Total votes	%	Con.	Lev.	Tot.
Swedish Social Democratic Party	S	1,509	5,072	10,617	11,057	1,893	3,004	2,860	5,973	1,958	4,016	1,285	2,043	2,267	2,900	1,322	57,776	30.73%	3	0	3
Sweden Democrats	SD	1,340	3,597	6,594	6,036	1,502	2,213	1,776	3,915	1,660	3,099	1,223	1,787	1,648	1,702	937	39,029	20.76%	2	0	2
Moderate Party	M	510	2,298	5,547	7,778	991	1,498	2,142	2,377	1,282	2,157	527	1,287	1,290	1,037	599	31,320	16.66%	2	0	2
Centre Party	C	553	983	2,411	4,669	946	979	1,408	1,105	627	1,624	505	933	945	468	657	18,813	10.01%	1	0	1
Left Party	V	251	950	2,460	3,227	418	733	771	1,392	411	842	371	464	477	563	324	13,654	7.26%	1	0	1
Christian Democrats	KD	252	732	1,661	2,358	589	680	1,038	762	401	932	333	544	469	335	436	11,522	6.13%	0	1	1
Liberals	L	121	425	1,421	1,822	259	261	396	591	213	464	120	237	239	183	96	6,848	3.64%	0	0	0
Green Party	MP	76	323	1,273	1,926	191	285	399	490	117	397	137	228	193	158	56	6,249	3.32%	0	0	0
Feminist Initiative	FI	9	36	114	201	39	35	41	60	12	53	28	25	19	17	11	700	0.37%	0	0	0
Alternative for Sweden	AfS	8	41	111	124	12	45	16	62	13	39	12	28	24	28	8	571	0.30%	0	0	0
Independent Rural Party	LPo	42	25	5	36	16	30	33	9	40	30	14	29	5	14	33	361	0.19%	0	0	0
Citizens' Coalition	MED	8	26	45	56	18	14	15	18	5	45	6	12	11	14	4	297	0.16%	0	0	0
Direct Democrats	DD	4	17	34	45	6	8	9	18	1	13	11	7	5	3	2	183	0.10%	0	0	0
Unity	ENH	3	12	31	36	3	20	15	9	4	10	11	8	1	7	2	172	0.09%	0	0	0
Pirate Party	PP	6	8	59	25	7	6	10	5	6	7	10	6	3	5	6	169	0.09%	0	0	0
Nordic Resistance Movement	NMR	1	7	40	12	6	3	6	60	5	7	3	2	8	1	2	163	0.09%	0	0	0
Christian Values Party	KrVP	1	11	5	9	1	4	4	9	1	1	1	1	0	4	0	52	0.03%	0	0	0
Classical Liberal Party	KLP	0	2	21	17	0	1	0	1	0	3	2	1	0	0	1	49	0.03%	0	0	0
Animals' Party	DjuP	1	3	4	8	4	0	3	1	0	3	2	0	3	1	1	34	0.02%	0	0	0
Basic Income Party	BASIP	0	1	5	1	0	0	1	1	0	2	0	1	3	0	0	15	0.01%	0	0	0
Communist Party of Sweden	SKP	1	0	0	0	0	0	0	3	0	2	0	0	0	0	1	7	0.00%	0	0	0
Initiative	INI	0	0	1	1	0	1	1	0	0	2	0	1	0	0	0	7	0.00%	0	0	0
European Workers Party	EAP	0	0	0	2	0	0	0	0	0	0	0	0	0	0	0	2	0.00%	0	0	0
Security Party	TRP	0	0	0	0	0	1	0	0	0	0	0	0	0	0	0	1	0.00%	0	0	0
Parties not on the ballot	ÖVR	0	4	1	15	0	3	0	7	0	0	0	0	0	0	3	33	0.02%	0	0	0
Valid votes		4,696	14,573	32,460	39,461	6,901	9,824	10,944	16,868	6,756	13,748	4,601	7,644	7,610	7,440	4,501	188,027	100.00%	9	1	10
Blank votes		85	148	349	376	87	111	102	213	76	150	57	94	129	101	63	2,141	1.13%			
Rejected votes – unregistered parties		2	7	14	9	5	3	6	7	0	1	1	2	2	0	0	59	0.03%			
Rejected votes – other		6	3	14	15	6	4	5	4	3	5	2	5	2	4	1	79	0.04%			
Total polled		4,789	14,731	32,837	39,861	6,999	9,942	11,057	17,092	6,835	13,904	4,661	7,745	7,743	7,545	4,565	190,306	87.62%			
Registered electors		5,527	16,988	37,646	44,894	7,834	11,584	12,357	19,629	7,858	16,056	5,376	8,884	8,713	8,564	5,295	217,205				
Turnout		86.65%	86.71%	87.23%	88.79%	89.34%	85.83%	89.48%	87.08%	86.98%	86.60%	86.70%	87.18%	88.87%	88.10%	86.21%	87.62%				

The following candidates were elected:

- Constituency seats (personal mandates) - Carl-Oskar Bohlin (M), 2,812 votes; Peter Hultqvist (S), 5,511 votes; and Daniel Riazat (V), 1,508 votes.
- Constituency seats (party mandates) - Ann-Britt Åsebol (M), 407 votes; Patrik Engström (S), 420 votes; Peter Helander (C), 873 votes; Mats Nordberg (SD), 245 votes; Magnus Persson (SD), 5 votes; and Maria Strömkvist (S), 513 votes.
- Levelling seats (personal mandates) - Lars Adaktusson (KD), 1,158 votes.

Permanent substitutions:

- Patrik Engström (S) resigned on 9 January 2022 and was replaced by Roza Güclü Hedin (S) on 10 January 2022.

===== 2014 =====
Results of the 2014 general election held on 14 September 2014:

Party		Votes per municipality															Total votes	%	Seats		
Party		Älv- dalen	Avesta	Bor- länge	Falun	Gagnef	Hede- mora	Lek- sand	Lud- vika	Malung- Sälen	Mora	Orsa	Rättvik	Säter	Smedje- backen	Vans- bro	Total votes	%	Con.	Lev.	Tot.
Swedish Social Democratic Party	S	1,955	6,121	11,825	11,555	2,214	3,478	3,110	6,836	2,414	4,776	1,523	2,362	2,489	3,262	1,623	65,543	35.45%	4	0	4
Moderate Party	M	638	2,264	5,713	8,871	1,225	1,756	2,511	2,590	1,506	2,629	666	1,593	1,376	1,109	640	35,087	18.98%	2	0	2
Sweden Democrats	SD	1,028	2,837	5,617	4,912	1,170	1,732	1,247	3,363	1,154	2,279	956	1,270	1,393	1,365	720	31,043	16.79%	2	0	2
Centre Party	C	452	825	1,615	3,058	786	920	1,056	691	575	1,338	493	760	772	401	629	14,371	7.77%	1	0	1
Left Party	V	211	820	1,953	2,271	348	605	515	1,287	315	605	261	337	398	493	253	10,672	5.77%	0	1	1
Green Party	MP	109	525	1,768	2,749	293	445	614	780	181	625	230	359	284	269	121	9,352	5.06%	0	1	1
Christian Democrats	KD	105	439	1,001	1,466	284	306	787	402	157	416	147	257	239	158	263	6,427	3.48%	0	0	0
Liberal People's Party	FP	109	453	1,181	1,711	211	278	403	522	247	386	127	270	217	139	96	6,350	3.43%	0	0	0
Feminist Initiative	FI	55	222	733	1,278	179	244	264	287	61	232	134	141	171	138	37	4,176	2.26%	0	0	0
Pirate Party	PP	22	39	140	161	20	53	35	42	19	72	23	32	28	28	20	734	0.40%	0	0	0
Independent Rural Party	LBPo	20	14	18	64	12	25	7	11	29	45	8	22	11	6	26	318	0.17%	0	0	0
Unity	ENH	3	12	43	49	8	14	12	6	3	18	17	13	3	4	2	207	0.11%	0	0	0
Party of the Swedes	SVP	2	12	52	14	10	12	4	8	7	8	4	12	12	5	2	164	0.09%	0	0	0
Animals' Party	DjuP	0	38	40	29	4	10	2	5	1	12	8	3	5	3	0	160	0.09%	0	0	0
Christian Values Party	KrVP	0	21	13	13	2	13	13	1	0	3	2	2	1	4	4	92	0.05%	0	0	0
Direct Democrats		1	1	10	13	1	20	1	4	2	2	2	1	4	2	1	65	0.04%	0	0	0
Classical Liberal Party	KLP	1	1	2	5	1	1	0	1	0	3	1	0	0	1	1	18	0.01%	0	0	0
Swedish Senior Citizen Interest Party	SPI	0	0	1	1	0	0	0	0	2	0	0	14	0	0	0	18	0.01%	0	0	0
European Workers Party	EAP	0	0	0	0	0	0	0	0	0	0	1	0	0	0	2	3	0.00%	0	0	0
Communist Party of Sweden	SKP	0	0	0	0	0	1	1	0	0	0	0	0	0	0	0	2	0.00%	0	0	0
Peace Democrats		0	0	1	0	0	0	1	0	0	0	0	0	0	0	0	2	0.00%	0	0	0
Health Party		0	0	0	0	0	0	0	0	0	0	1	0	0	0	0	1	0.00%	0	0	0
Parties not on the ballot		3	10	14	31	3	10	1	5	1	8	3	10	2	4	1	106	0.06%	0	0	0
Valid votes		4,714	14,654	31,740	38,251	6,771	9,923	10,584	16,841	6,674	13,457	4,607	7,458	7,405	7,391	4,441	184,911	100.00%	9	2	11
Blank votes		67	154	396	464	92	125	120	226	89	139	33	113	96	81	67	2,262	1.21%			
Rejected votes – other		2	5	10	14	0	2	3	32	5	6	0	3	1	0	0	83	0.04%			
Total polled		4,783	14,813	32,146	38,729	6,863	10,050	10,707	17,099	6,768	13,602	4,640	7,574	7,502	7,472	4,508	187,256	86.18%			
Registered electors		5,586	17,224	37,298	44,325	7,791	11,875	12,240	20,005	7,937	16,106	5,470	8,949	8,594	8,550	5,343	217,293				
Turnout		85.62%	86.00%	86.19%	87.38%	88.09%	84.63%	87.48%	85.47%	85.27%	84.45%	84.83%	84.64%	87.29%	87.39%	84.37%	86.18%				

The following candidates were elected:

- Constituency seats (personal mandates) - Anders Ahlgren (C), 860 votes; Carl-Oskar Bohlin (M), 3,325 votes; and Peter Hultqvist (S), 5,549 votes.
- Constituency seats (party mandates) - Ulf Berg (M), 1,074 votes; Roza Güclü Hedin (S), 1,807 votes; Magnus Persson (SD), 2 votes; Sven-Olof Sällström (SD), 16 votes; Maria Strömkvist (S), 712 votes, and Hans Unander (S), 886 votes.
- Levelling seats (personal mandates) - Daniel Riazat (V), 1,198 votes.
- Levelling seats (party mandates) - Jan Lindholm (MP), 392 votes

Permanent substitutions:

- Anders Ahlgren (C) resigned on 10 January 2016 and was replaced by Peter Helander (C) on 11 January 2016.
- Ulf Berg (M) resigned on 12 September 2016 and was replaced by Ann-Britt Åsebol (M) on 13 September 2016.
- Hans Unander (S) resigned on 31 March 2017 and was replaced by Patrik Engström (S) on 1 April 2017.

===== 2010 =====
Results of the 2010 general election held on 19 September 2010:

Party		Votes per municipality															Total votes	%	Seats		
Party		Älv- dalen	Avesta	Bor- länge	Falun	Gagnef	Hede- mora	Lek- sand	Lud- vika	Malung- Sälen	Mora	Orsa	Rättvik	Säter	Smedje- backen	Vans- bro	Total votes	%	Con.	Lev.	Tot.
Swedish Social Democratic Party	S	1,923	6,320	12,164	11,523	2,284	3,525	2,964	7,466	2,434	4,666	1,599	2,438	2,392	3,664	1,777	67,139	37.47%	4	0	4
Moderate Party	M	1,052	3,289	7,142	10,558	1,548	2,311	3,218	3,425	2,002	3,468	940	1,899	1,856	1,421	868	44,997	25.11%	3	0	3
Centre Party	C	489	897	1,652	2,942	802	926	965	641	548	1,169	453	800	828	364	610	14,086	7.86%	1	0	1
Sweden Democrats	SD	363	1,034	2,842	2,007	475	803	410	1,251	382	787	400	437	552	461	266	12,470	6.96%	1	0	1
Green Party	MP	171	710	1,853	2,963	396	589	665	842	200	772	292	441	347	298	113	10,652	5.95%	1	0	1
Left Party	V	245	778	2,039	2,009	326	623	425	1,363	449	600	273	268	400	479	256	10,533	5.88%	0	1	1
Liberal People's Party	FP	142	684	1,532	2,092	266	341	546	833	388	631	202	367	324	243	156	8,747	4.88%	0	0	0
Christian Democrats	KD	173	496	1,075	1,813	373	446	899	549	171	584	207	350	299	191	299	7,925	4.42%	0	0	0
Pirate Party	PP	15	76	230	240	32	53	63	94	42	91	37	46	39	47	22	1,127	0.63%	0	0	0
Feminist Initiative	FI	7	41	105	173	13	35	46	25	5	25	12	36	29	10	8	570	0.32%	0	0	0
Swedish Senior Citizen Interest Party	SPI	6	4	54	162	13	14	29	35	6	79	1	60	11	8	4	486	0.27%	0	0	0
Rural Democrats		25	2	13	35	5	3	12	16	42	48	4	5	4	13	14	241	0.13%	0	0	0
National Democrats	ND	1	0	18	2	2	6	0	0	1	2	0	0	0	0	2	34	0.02%	0	0	0
Freedom Party		0	2	4	5	0	8	0	1	0	3	1	1	1	0	0	26	0.01%	0	0	0
Unity	ENH	0	0	4	12	0	0	1	0	0	1	1	4	0	0	0	23	0.01%	0	0	0
Party of the Swedes	SVP	0	1	12	0	2	0	0	0	0	0	0	3	0	0	0	18	0.01%	0	0	0
Classical Liberal Party	KLP	0	1	5	2	0	0	0	0	0	2	0	1	2	0	0	13	0.01%	0	0	0
Spirits Party		0	0	2	2	1	0	0	3	0	0	0	0	0	0	0	8	0.00%	0	0	0
Republican Party		0	0	1	2	0	0	0	2	0	0	0	0	0	0	0	5	0.00%	0	0	0
European Workers Party	EAP	0	0	0	2	0	0	0	0	0	0	0	1	0	0	0	3	0.00%	0	0	0
Norrland Coalition Party	NorrS	1	0	0	1	0	0	0	0	0	0	0	0	0	0	0	2	0.00%	0	0	0
Socialist Justice Party	RS	0	0	1	0	0	0	0	1	0	0	0	0	0	0	0	2	0.00%	0	0	0
Active Democracy		0	0	0	0	0	0	1	0	0	0	0	0	0	0	0	1	0.00%	0	0	0
Communist Party of Sweden	SKP	0	0	0	0	0	1	0	0	0	0	0	0	0	0	0	1	0.00%	0	0	0
Parties not on the ballot		2	10	8	14	4	2	1	5	2	2	2	2	1	1	3	59	0.03%	0	0	0
Valid votes		4,615	14,345	30,756	36,559	6,542	9,686	10,245	16,552	6,672	12,930	4,424	7,159	7,085	7,200	4,398	179,168	100.00%	10	1	11
Blank votes		83	205	411	531	97	130	171	253	120	207	66	120	139	101	88	2,722	1.50%			
Rejected votes – other		1	3	10	11	3	4	2	5	0	1	2	5	1	1	3	52	0.03%			
Total polled		4,699	14,553	31,177	37,101	6,642	9,820	10,418	16,810	6,792	13,138	4,492	7,284	7,225	7,302	4,489	181,942	83.82%			
Registered electors		5,790	17,393	36,721	43,469	7,744	12,006	12,253	20,340	8,207	16,127	5,447	8,901	8,638	8,571	5,465	217,072				
Turnout		81.16%	83.67%	84.90%	85.35%	85.77%	81.79%	85.02%	82.65%	82.76%	81.47%	82.47%	81.83%	83.64%	85.19%	82.14%	83.82%				

The following candidates were elected:

- Constituency seats (personal mandates) - Peter Hultqvist (S), 7,168 votes; and Kenneth Johansson (C), 1,416 votes.
- Constituency seats (party mandates) - Ann-Britt Åsebol (M), 1,855 votes; Ulf Berg (M), 1,952 votes; Carl-Oskar Bohlin (M), 1,333 votes; Roza Güclü Hedin (S), 1,802 votes; Kurt Kvarnström (S), 1,409 votes; Jan Lindholm (MP), 439 votes; William Petzäll (SD), 15 votes; and Carin Runeson (S), 849 votes.
- Levelling seats (party mandates) - Lena Olsson (V), 678 votes.

Permanent substitutions:

- Kenneth Johansson (C) resigned on 31 August 2012 and was replaced by Anders Ahlgren (C) on 1 September 2012.
- William Petzäll (SD) died on 1 September 2012 and was replaced by Stellan Bojerud (SD) on 4 September 2012.

==== 2000s ====
===== 2006 =====
Results of the 2006 general election held on 17 September 2006:

Party		Votes per municipality															Total votes	%	Seats		
Party		Älv- dalen	Avesta	Bor- länge	Falun	Gagnef	Hede- mora	Lek- sand	Lud- vika	Malung	Mora	Orsa	Rättvik	Säter	Smedje- backen	Vans- bro	Total votes	%	Con.	Lev.	Tot.
Swedish Social Democratic Party	S	1,874	6,335	12,894	11,633	2,350	3,744	3,080	7,695	2,465	4,374	1,481	2,441	2,517	3,672	1,663	68,218	40.34%	5	0	5
Moderate Party	M	778	2,646	5,318	8,775	1,107	1,794	2,509	2,602	1,721	2,808	894	1,506	1,347	1,104	706	35,615	21.06%	3	0	3
Centre Party	C	640	1,154	2,065	3,615	990	1,115	1,333	949	769	1,640	664	1,038	1,047	502	676	18,197	10.76%	1	0	1
Left Party	V	206	914	2,025	2,027	347	683	474	1,566	513	627	295	281	454	523	316	11,251	6.65%	1	0	1
Christian Democrats	KD	233	607	1,255	2,037	443	482	1,034	631	243	579	234	371	379	236	395	9,159	5.42%	0	1	1
Liberal People's Party	FP	179	672	1,608	2,157	249	374	489	683	411	592	178	385	330	219	155	8,681	5.13%	0	1	1
Green Party	MP	118	469	1,240	2,106	249	427	478	501	157	573	217	277	256	195	98	7,361	4.35%	0	1	1
Sweden Democrats	SD	147	553	1,012	845	166	284	151	461	135	222	138	171	167	148	123	4,723	2.79%	0	0	0
Pirate Party	PP	29	98	271	215	42	50	59	137	30	121	33	46	35	45	19	1,230	0.73%	0	0	0
June List	JL	63	66	176	205	45	67	59	151	13	101	42	72	58	72	28	1,218	0.72%	0	0	0
Swedish Senior Citizen Interest Party	SPI	18	29	148	440	31	32	42	47	13	160	12	83	35	24	14	1,128	0.67%	0	0	0
Feminist Initiative	FI	20	61	155	262	22	52	61	74	26	73	28	40	60	30	17	981	0.58%	0	0	0
Health Care Party	Sjvåp	79	110	87	29	33	46	45	124	21	167	30	38	30	51	35	925	0.55%	0	0	0
New Future	NYF	30	4	10	45	3	7	1	0	0	1	0	1	6	0	0	108	0.06%	0	0	0
National Democrats	ND	1	6	32	8	0	8	0	6	2	4	1	1	5	16	0	90	0.05%	0	0	0
Unity	ENH	2	5	7	12	1	6	8	6	2	2	3	9	4	1	0	68	0.04%	0	0	0
National Socialist Front	NSF	0	2	18	6	2	2	8	5	2	1	0	6	5	0	0	57	0.03%	0	0	0
People's Will		0	1	1	13	1	2	2	13	1	5	2	9	1	0	2	53	0.03%	0	0	0
Unique Party		0	0	2	4	0	0	0	0	0	0	0	0	1	1	0	8	0.00%	0	0	0
Nordic Union		0	0	2	0	0	0	0	0	0	0	0	0	0	0	0	2	0.00%	0	0	0
Socialist Justice Party	RS	0	1	0	0	0	0	0	0	0	0	0	1	0	0	0	2	0.00%	0	0	0
Women's Power		0	0	0	2	0	0	0	0	0	0	0	0	0	0	0	2	0.00%	0	0	0
Active Democracy		0	0	0	1	0	0	0	0	0	0	0	0	0	0	0	1	0.00%	0	0	0
European Workers Party	EAP	0	0	1	0	0	0	0	0	0	0	0	0	0	0	0	1	0.00%	0	0	0
Sweden Out of the EU / Free Justice Party	UT/FRP	0	0	1	0	0	0	0	0	0	0	0	0	0	0	0	1	0.00%	0	0	0
Parties not on the ballot		2	1	5	5	0	2	1	5	3	3	1	0	2	0	0	30	0.02%	0	0	0
Valid votes		4,419	13,734	28,333	34,442	6,081	9,177	9,834	15,656	6,527	12,053	4,253	6,776	6,739	6,839	4,247	169,110	100.00%	10	3	13
Blank votes		141	322	602	673	103	172	213	423	147	280	97	140	180	141	130	3,764	2.18%			
Rejected votes – other		2	6	12	11	5	3	5	7	4	2	0	2	0	2	1	62	0.04%			
Total polled		4,562	14,062	28,947	35,126	6,189	9,352	10,052	16,086	6,678	12,335	4,350	6,918	6,919	6,982	4,378	172,936	80.48%			
Registered electors		5,947	17,454	35,866	42,717	7,597	11,945	12,129	20,317	8,263	15,871	5,417	8,760	8,524	8,554	5,515	214,876				
Turnout		76.71%	80.57%	80.71%	82.23%	81.47%	78.29%	82.88%	79.18%	80.82%	77.72%	80.30%	78.97%	81.17%	81.62%	79.38%	80.48%				

The following candidates were elected:

- Constituency seats (personal mandates) - Rolf Gunnarsson (M), 4,832 votes; Peter Hultqvist (S), 6,221 votes; and Kenneth Johansson (C), 1,627 votes.
- Constituency seats (party mandates) - Ulf Berg (M), 782 votes; Kurt Kvarnström (S), 1,011 votes; Lena Olsson (V), 631 votes; Mikael Rosén (M), 440 votes; Carin Runeson (S), 372 votes; Anneli Särnblad (S), 1,278 votes; and Marita Ulvskog (S), 3,637 votes.
- Levelling seats (personal mandates) - Camilla Lindberg (FP), 756 votes; and Lennart Sacrédeus (KD), 899 votes.
- Levelling seats (party mandates) - Jan Lindholm (MP), 315 votes;

Permanent substitutions:

- Mikael Rosén (M) resigned on 15 November 2006 and was replaced by Patrik Forslund (M) on 16 November 2006.
- Marita Ulvskog (S) resigned on 13 July 2009 upon being elected to the European Parliament and was replaced by Hans Unander (S) on 14 July 2009.

===== 2002 =====
Results of the 2002 general election held on 15 September 2002:

Party		Votes per municipality															Total votes	%	Seats		
Party		Älv- dalen	Avesta	Bor- länge	Falun	Gagnef	Hede- mora	Lek- sand	Lud- vika	Malung	Mora	Orsa	Rättvik	Säter	Smedje- backen	Vans- bro	Total votes	%	Con.	Lev.	Tot.
Swedish Social Democratic Party	S	1,839	6,633	13,265	12,519	2,346	3,823	3,291	8,363	2,771	4,543	1,480	2,530	2,531	3,688	1,742	71,364	43.78%	5	0	5
Moderate Party	M	337	1,270	2,831	4,974	573	945	1,181	1,387	942	1,421	414	829	753	632	373	18,862	11.57%	1	0	1
Centre Party	C	581	1,253	1,704	2,744	874	1,149	1,325	708	733	1,417	547	950	1,005	443	660	16,093	9.87%	1	0	1
Liberal People's Party	FP	379	1,165	2,593	4,077	519	678	965	1,193	648	1,279	366	736	535	463	284	15,880	9.74%	1	0	1
Left Party	V	338	1,292	2,724	2,806	423	928	723	2,049	618	959	411	437	633	771	370	15,482	9.50%	1	0	1
Christian Democrats	KD	362	922	1,686	2,450	615	706	1,233	916	425	1,004	330	525	548	339	445	12,506	7.67%	1	0	1
Green Party	MP	182	467	1,417	1,811	261	459	454	602	171	602	240	295	261	249	128	7,599	4.66%	0	1	1
Swedish Senior Citizen Interest Party	SPI	69	87	411	729	103	51	128	74	64	245	76	93	63	23	22	2,238	1.37%	0	0	0
Sweden Democrats	SD	35	104	501	346	47	54	76	170	36	114	112	55	55	32	56	1,793	1.10%	0	0	0
New Future	NYF	117	25	93	47	25	49	36	31	68	60	20	13	44	36	46	710	0.44%	0	0	0
Socialist Party	SOC.P	1	12	24	28	1	14	0	0	1	0	0	1	2	0	0	84	0.05%	0	0	0
Norrbotten Party	NBP	6	0	2	8	1	0	0	0	0	2	4	5	0	5	1	34	0.02%	0	0	0
Unity	ENH	1	0	9	3	1	3	2	1	0	0	3	3	0	0	0	26	0.02%	0	0	0
Socialist Justice Party	RS	1	1	0	1	0	1	0	0	0	0	0	0	0	0	0	4	0.00%	0	0	0
European Workers Party	EAP	1	0	1	0	0	0	0	0	0	0	0	0	0	0	1	3	0.00%	0	0	0
The Communists	KOMM	0	0	0	0	0	0	0	0	1	0	0	0	0	0	0	1	0.00%	0	0	0
Other parties	ÖVR	10	23	52	50	13	56	14	27	6	14	12	25	15	12	4	333	0.20%	0	0	0
Valid votes		4,259	13,254	27,313	32,593	5,802	8,916	9,428	15,521	6,484	11,660	4,015	6,497	6,445	6,693	4,132	163,012	100.00%	10	1	11
Rejected votes		91	251	547	534	115	142	164	358	128	232	63	135	139	137	124	3,160	1.90%			
Total polled		4,350	13,505	27,860	33,127	5,917	9,058	9,592	15,879	6,612	11,892	4,078	6,632	6,584	6,830	4,256	166,172	77.76%			
Registered electors		6,082	17,440	35,647	41,804	7,455	11,949	11,919	20,498	8,349	15,631	5,346	8,684	8,441	8,783	5,663	213,691				
Turnout		71.52%	77.44%	78.16%	79.24%	79.37%	75.81%	80.48%	77.47%	79.20%	76.08%	76.28%	76.37%	78.00%	77.76%	75.15%	77.76%				

The following candidates were elected:

- Constituency seats (personal mandates) - Rolf Gunnarsson (M), 3,386 votes; Kenneth Johansson (C), 1,703 votes; and Marita Ulvskog (S), 6,528 votes.
- Constituency seats (party mandates) - Lennart Fremling (FP), 1,083 votes; Per Erik Granström (S), 1,985 votes; Barbro Hietala Nordlund (S), 1,714 votes; Kurt Kvarnström (S), 1,514 votes; Ulrik Lindgren (KD), 905 votes; Anneli Särnblad (S), 1,247 votes; and Anders Wiklund (V), 1,031 votes.
- Levelling seats (personal mandates) - Kerstin-Maria Stalín (MP), 637 votes.

Permanent substitutions:

- Kerstin-Maria Stalín (MP) resigned on 14 November 2004 and was replaced by Jan Lindholm (MP) on 15 November 2004.

==== 1990s ====
===== 1998 =====
Results of the 1998 general election held on 20 September 1998:

Party		Votes per municipality															Total votes	%	Seats		
Party		Älv- dalen	Avesta	Bor- länge	Falun	Gagnef	Hede- mora	Lek- sand	Lud- vika	Malung	Mora	Orsa	Rättvik	Säter	Smedje- backen	Vans- bro	Total votes	%	Con.	Lev.	Tot.
Swedish Social Democratic Party	S	1,770	6,607	12,596	10,787	2,172	3,852	2,950	7,765	2,744	4,214	1,423	2,177	2,335	3,547	1,757	66,696	39.29%	4	0	4
Moderate Party	M	609	1,906	4,225	7,210	879	1,482	1,853	2,181	1,432	2,200	629	1,301	1,161	1,003	620	28,691	16.90%	2	0	2
Left Party	V	736	2,096	4,273	4,023	746	1,544	1,123	3,450	1,044	1,597	739	720	985	1,420	622	25,118	14.80%	2	0	2
Christian Democrats	KD	548	1,333	2,585	4,092	871	1,000	1,736	1,408	672	1,684	644	853	864	509	574	19,373	11.41%	1	0	1
Centre Party	C	465	952	1,153	1,738	628	850	854	448	511	800	309	571	796	354	479	10,908	6.43%	1	0	1
Green Party	MP	240	607	1,511	1,894	443	509	583	603	184	719	258	336	286	296	167	8,636	5.09%	0	1	1
Liberal People's Party	FP	123	378	916	1,500	168	245	273	446	286	486	122	328	187	161	112	5,731	3.38%	0	0	0
Other parties		120	280	891	1,246	171	155	212	319	70	350	101	284	180	111	130	4,620	2.72%	0	0	0
Valid votes		4,611	14,159	28,150	32,490	6,078	9,637	9,584	16,620	6,943	12,050	4,225	6,570	6,794	7,401	4,461	169,773	100.00%	10	1	11
Rejected votes		150	292	733	774	142	202	189	485	181	308	86	141	174	215	125	4,197	2.41%			
Total polled		4,761	14,451	28,883	33,264	6,220	9,839	9,773	17,105	7,124	12,358	4,311	6,711	6,968	7,616	4,586	173,970	80.34%			
Registered electors		6,303	17,877	35,840	41,036	7,616	12,291	11,868	21,278	8,655	15,884	5,474	8,785	8,492	9,278	5,862	216,539				
Turnout		75.54%	80.84%	80.59%	81.06%	81.67%	80.05%	82.35%	80.39%	82.31%	77.80%	78.75%	76.39%	82.05%	82.09%	78.23%	80.34%				

The following candidates were elected:

- Constituency seats (personal mandates) - Christel Anderberg (M), 3,363 votes; Hans Andersson (V), 2,742 votes; Rolf Gunnarsson (M), 2,899 votes; Kenneth Johansson (C), 1,030 votes; and Bengt-Ola Ryttar (S), 8,439 votes.
- Constituency seats (party mandates) - Laila Bäck (S), 1,461 votes; Ulf Björklund (KD), 682 votes; Per Erik Granström (S), 1,687 votes; Lena Olsson (V), 1,333 votes; and Marita Ulvskog (S), 4,110 votes.
- Levelling seats (personal mandates) - Kerstin-Maria Stalín (MP), 1,005 votes.

Permanent substitutions:

- Laila Bäck (S) resigned on 25 October 2001 and was replaced by Barbro Hietala Nordlund (S) on 26 October 2001.

===== 1994 =====
Results of the 1994 general election held on 18 September 1994:

Party		Votes per municipality															Total votes	%	Seats		
Party		Älv- dalen	Avesta	Bor- länge	Falun	Gagnef	Hede- mora	Lek- sand	Lud- vika	Malung	Mora	Orsa	Rättvik	Säter	Smedje- backen	Vans- bro	Total votes	%	Con.	Lev.	Tot.
Swedish Social Democratic Party	S	2,507	8,885	16,937	14,295	2,996	5,278	3,857	11,201	3,755	5,682	1,986	2,964	3,201	4,999	2,494	91,037	49.46%	6	0	6
Moderate Party	M	711	1,877	4,432	7,395	933	1,565	2,023	2,258	1,335	2,332	658	1,394	1,241	962	641	29,757	16.17%	2	0	2
Centre Party	C	886	1,588	1,917	3,303	992	1,315	1,304	906	925	1,423	566	884	1,166	658	731	18,564	10.09%	1	0	1
Left Party	V	287	1,236	2,292	2,059	350	840	537	1,768	447	735	392	345	507	708	310	12,813	6.96%	1	0	1
Green Party	MP	347	724	1,732	2,400	491	598	764	896	280	947	387	475	387	370	224	11,022	5.99%	1	0	1
Liberal People's Party	FP	201	722	1,718	2,931	307	512	588	859	491	815	203	489	363	307	204	10,710	5.82%	0	1	1
Christian Democratic Unity	KDS	145	478	900	1,443	333	396	767	452	189	546	233	295	286	142	263	6,868	3.73%	0	1	1
New Democracy	NyD	46	107	305	325	77	64	92	178	52	126	68	124	115	81	46	1,806	0.98%	0	0	0
Other parties		31	114	273	295	50	138	62	118	53	98	27	44	83	48	45	1,479	0.80%	0	0	0
Valid votes		5,161	15,731	30,506	34,446	6,529	10,706	9,994	18,636	7,527	12,704	4,520	7,014	7,349	8,275	4,958	184,056	100.00%	11	2	13
Rejected votes		100	240	465	649	123	183	150	293	124	272	51	121	143	140	112	3,166	1.69%			
Total polled		5,261	15,971	30,971	35,095	6,652	10,889	10,144	18,929	7,651	12,976	4,571	7,135	7,492	8,415	5,070	187,222	85.24%			
Registered electors		6,392	18,542	35,929	41,045	7,649	12,667	11,754	21,989	8,875	15,914	5,548	8,948	8,671	9,638	6,087	219,648				
Turnout		82.31%	86.13%	86.20%	85.50%	86.97%	85.96%	86.30%	86.08%	86.21%	81.54%	82.39%	79.74%	86.40%	87.31%	83.29%	85.24%				

The following candidates were elected: Christel Anderberg (M); Hans Andersson (V); Laila Bäck (S); Ulf Björklund (KDS); Lennart Fremling (FP); Per Erik Granström (S); Rolf Gunnarsson (M); Birgitta Hambraeus (C); Barbro Hietala Nordlund (S); Leo Persson (S); Ragnhild Pohanka (MP); Bengt-Ola Ryttar (S); and Iréne Vestlund (S).

===== 1991 =====
Results of the 1991 general election held on 15 September 1991:

Party		Votes per municipality															Total votes	%	Seats		
Party		Älv- dalen	Avesta	Bor- länge	Falun	Gagnef	Hede- mora	Lek- sand	Lud- vika	Malung	Mora	Orsa	Rättvik	Säter	Smedje- backen	Vans- bro	Total votes	%	Con.	Lev.	Tot.
Swedish Social Democratic Party	S	2,092	8,041	14,031	11,513	2,468	4,600	3,089	10,093	3,251	4,284	1,626	2,351	2,614	4,382	2,131	76,566	41.82%	5	0	5
Moderate Party	M	763	1,896	4,494	7,373	876	1,530	1,768	2,281	1,335	2,274	660	1,310	1,218	939	655	29,372	16.04%	2	0	2
Centre Party	C	921	1,852	2,375	3,470	1,115	1,408	1,459	1,162	1,126	1,850	665	965	1,269	763	897	21,297	11.63%	1	0	1
Liberal People's Party	FP	319	907	2,280	3,349	379	672	792	1,150	638	923	341	580	459	447	268	13,504	7.38%	1	0	1
New Democracy	NyD	472	940	1,895	2,255	448	634	719	1,254	576	1,283	474	731	627	593	346	13,247	7.24%	1	0	1
Christian Democratic Unity	KDS	263	907	1,739	2,510	575	693	1,147	979	400	842	361	598	542	383	432	12,371	6.76%	1	0	1
Left Party	V	200	986	1,557	1,273	200	592	298	1,258	255	419	248	206	330	525	220	8,567	4.68%	0	1	1
Green Party	MP	165	389	937	1,316	305	404	333	498	169	485	217	252	210	221	85	5,986	3.27%	0	0	0
Other parties		30	116	331	645	86	144	85	205	69	132	32	103	94	71	34	2,177	1.19%	0	0	0
Valid votes		5,225	16,034	29,639	33,704	6,452	10,677	9,690	18,880	7,819	12,492	4,624	7,096	7,363	8,324	5,068	183,087	100.00%	11	1	12
Rejected votes		98	270	601	615	136	211	152	373	122	242	50	109	181	154	123	3,437	1.84%			
Total polled		5,323	16,304	30,240	34,319	6,588	10,888	9,842	19,253	7,941	12,734	4,674	7,205	7,544	8,478	5,191	186,524	84.80%			
Registered electors		6,464	18,970	35,390	40,563	7,643	12,634	11,486	22,638	9,076	15,695	5,632	8,946	8,726	9,903	6,203	219,969				
Turnout		82.35%	85.95%	85.45%	84.61%	86.20%	86.18%	85.69%	85.05%	87.49%	81.13%	82.99%	80.54%	86.45%	85.61%	83.69%	84.80%				

The following candidates were elected: Christel Anderberg (M); Ulf Björklund (KDS); Odd Engström (S); Lennart Fremling (FP); Margareta Gard (M); Lars-Ove Hagberg (V); Birgitta Hambraeus (C); Inger Hestvik (S); Stefan Kihlberg (NyD); Leo Persson (S); Bengt-Ola Ryttar (S); and Iréne Vestlund (S).

Permanent substitutions:

- Lars-Ove Hagberg (V) resigned on 31 August 1992 and was replaced by Hans Andersson (V) on 1 September 1992.
- Odd Engström (S) resigned on 9 February 1993 and was replaced by Per Erik Granström (S) on 10 February 1993.

==== 1980s ====
===== 1988 =====
Results of the 1988 general election held on 18 September 1988:

Party		Votes per municipality															Total votes	%	Seats		
Party		Älv- dalen	Avesta	Bor- länge	Falun	Gagnef	Hede- mora	Lek- sand	Lud- vika	Malung	Mora	Orsa	Rättvik	Säter	Smedje- backen	Vans- bro	Total votes	%	Con.	Lev.	Tot.
Swedish Social Democratic Party	S	2,322	8,985	15,214	12,975	2,654	5,045	3,259	10,977	3,694	4,844	1,828	2,551	2,925	5,033	2,347	84,653	47.00%	6	0	6
Centre Party	C	1,144	2,110	3,069	4,385	1,372	1,733	1,964	1,593	1,424	2,472	827	1,312	1,534	939	1,067	26,945	14.96%	2	0	2
Moderate Party	M	443	1,380	3,138	5,944	659	1,211	1,347	1,810	1,053	1,693	551	985	849	639	563	22,265	12.36%	1	0	1
Liberal People's Party	FP	526	1,263	3,083	4,715	551	961	1,015	1,476	839	1,375	503	881	698	567	464	18,917	10.50%	1	0	1
Left Party – Communists	VPK	198	1,197	1,959	1,726	259	704	324	1,792	284	601	257	282	362	618	239	10,802	6.00%	1	0	1
Green Party	MP	373	685	1,765	2,022	407	598	572	1,030	339	759	347	416	366	327	280	10,286	5.71%	0	1	1
Christian Democratic Unity	KDS	122	476	721	1,079	275	310	677	413	120	338	153	335	229	137	241	5,626	3.12%	0	0	0
Other parties		6	82	271	74	9	53	14	42	9	15	7	16	7	21	5	631	0.35%	0	0	0
Valid votes		5,134	16,178	29,220	32,920	6,186	10,615	9,172	19,133	7,762	12,097	4,473	6,778	6,970	8,281	5,206	180,125	100.00%	11	1	12
Rejected votes		72	191	433	452	94	151	120	261	99	133	44	65	125	112	91	2,443	1.34%			
Total polled		5,206	16,369	29,653	33,372	6,280	10,766	9,292	19,394	7,861	12,230	4,517	6,843	7,095	8,393	5,297	182,568	83.97%			
Registered electors		6,443	19,039	35,064	39,886	7,293	12,644	10,898	22,855	9,127	15,266	5,637	8,777	8,388	9,778	6,313	217,408				
Turnout		80.80%	85.98%	84.57%	83.67%	86.11%	85.15%	85.26%	84.86%	86.13%	80.11%	80.13%	77.97%	84.59%	85.84%	83.91%	83.97%				

The following candidates were elected: Lars De Geer (FP); Göran Engström (C); Kjell-Olof Feldt (S); Lars-Ove Hagberg (VPK); Birgitta Hambraeus (C); Inger Hestvik (S); Ove Karlsson (S); Björn Körlof (M); Arne Mellqvist (S); Ragnhild Pohanka (MP); Bengt-Ola Ryttar (S); and Iréne Vestlund (S).

Permanent substitutions:

- Björn Körlof (M) resigned on 2 October 1989 and was replaced by Margareta Gard (M).
- Kjell-Olof Feldt (S) resigned on 19 February 1990 and was replaced by Leo Persson (S) on 20 February 1990.

===== 1985 =====
Results of the 1985 general election held on 15 September 1985:

Party		Votes per municipality															Total votes	%	Seats		
Party		Älv- dalen	Avesta	Bor- länge	Falun	Gagnef	Hede- mora	Lek- sand	Lud- vika	Malung	Mora	Orsa	Rättvik	Säter	Smedje- backen	Vans- bro	Total votes	%	Con.	Lev.	Tot.
Swedish Social Democratic Party	S	2,425	10,023	16,669	14,068	2,911	5,617	3,520	12,328	3,962	5,337	2,047	2,690	3,167	5,452	2,644	92,860	48.53%	6	0	6
Centre Party	C	1,414	2,468	3,412	5,122	1,557	1,929	2,422	1,761	1,520	2,862	935	1,673	1,693	1,034	1,414	31,216	16.31%	2	0	2
Moderate Party	M	804	1,947	4,462	7,618	902	1,640	1,906	2,486	1,383	2,324	814	1,415	1,185	923	801	30,610	16.00%	2	0	2
Liberal People's Party	FP	557	1,515	3,362	5,463	736	1,220	1,262	1,927	971	1,670	610	1,145	837	724	543	22,542	11.78%	1	0	1
Left Party – Communists	VPK	207	1,026	1,811	1,510	212	642	282	1,837	296	467	273	260	330	574	238	9,965	5.21%	0	1	1
Green Party	MP	120	282	728	598	138	275	158	346	133	222	145	130	121	121	93	3,610	1.89%	0	0	0
Other parties		6	23	325	65	8	14	11	33	7	23	2	5	11	14	9	556	0.29%	0	0	0
Valid votes		5,533	17,284	30,769	34,444	6,464	11,337	9,561	20,718	8,272	12,905	4,826	7,318	7,344	8,842	5,742	191,359	100.00%	11	1	12
Rejected votes		52	148	328	373	71	123	103	214	67	117	39	57	105	95	64	1,956	1.01%			
Total polled		5,585	17,432	31,097	34,817	6,535	11,460	9,664	20,932	8,339	13,022	4,865	7,375	7,449	8,937	5,806	193,315	88.75%			
Registered electors		6,543	19,339	34,807	39,365	7,216	12,805	10,883	23,434	9,211	15,103	5,704	8,776	8,337	9,808	6,493	217,824				
Turnout		85.36%	90.14%	89.34%	88.45%	90.56%	89.50%	88.80%	89.32%	90.53%	86.22%	85.29%	84.04%	89.35%	91.12%	89.42%	88.75%				

The following candidates were elected: Karl Boo (C); Lars De Geer (FP); Kjell-Olof Feldt (S); Margareta Gard (M); Lars-Ove Hagberg (VPK); Birgitta Hambraeus (C); Inger Hestvik (S); Ove Karlsson (S); Björn Körlof (M); Yngve Nyquist (S); Bo Södersten (S); and Iréne Vestlund (S).

Permanent substitutions:

- Yngve Nyquist (S) died on 12 December 1985 and was replaced by Bengt-Ola Ryttar (S) on 18 December 1985.

===== 1982 =====
Results of the 1982 general election held on 19 September 1982:

Party		Votes per municipality															Total votes	%	Seats		
Party		Älv- dalen	Avesta	Bor- länge	Falun	Gagnef	Hede- mora	Lek- sand	Lud- vika	Malung	Mora	Orsa	Rättvik	Säter	Smedje- backen	Vans- bro	Total votes	%	Con.	Lev.	Tot.
Swedish Social Democratic Party	S	2,577	10,603	17,974	14,401	2,928	5,776	3,585	13,382	4,142	5,383	2,152	2,758	3,201	5,663	2,791	97,316	50.10%	6	0	6
Centre Party	C	1,811	2,969	4,592	6,626	1,771	2,271	2,642	2,410	1,926	3,691	1,063	2,045	2,036	1,313	1,508	38,674	19.91%	3	0	3
Moderate Party	M	715	2,139	4,878	8,300	989	1,851	2,029	2,734	1,284	2,510	930	1,524	1,280	952	854	32,969	16.97%	2	0	2
Left Party – Communists	VPK	171	1,061	1,717	1,537	215	538	239	1,780	314	459	247	278	288	499	268	9,611	4.95%	0	1	1
Liberal People's Party	FP	235	636	1,215	2,089	249	428	514	759	420	485	215	418	302	302	206	8,473	4.36%	0	0	0
Green Party	MP	89	277	579	779	130	292	177	362	120	228	131	170	127	108	89	3,658	1.88%	0	0	0
Christian Democratic Unity	KDS	96	307	404	592	177	207	332	218	84	192	126	131	133	70	194	3,263	1.68%	0	0	0
K-Party	K-P	0	8	19	10	2	1	0	12	0	5	0	0	2	12	0	71	0.04%	0	0	0
Other parties		0	14	56	52	7	14	4	30	17	9	2	5	5	7	3	225	0.12%	0	0	0
Valid votes		5,694	18,014	31,434	34,386	6,468	11,378	9,522	21,687	8,307	12,962	4,866	7,329	7,374	8,926	5,913	194,260	100.00%	11	1	12
Rejected votes		51	149	291	444	76	125	95	210	68	117	43	77	74	75	67	1,962	1.00%			
Total polled		5,745	18,163	31,725	34,830	6,544	11,503	9,617	21,897	8,375	13,079	4,909	7,406	7,448	9,001	5,980	196,222	90.68%			
Registered electors		6,544	19,571	34,666	38,617	7,105	12,599	10,653	24,038	9,135	14,679	5,657	8,677	8,149	9,704	6,588	216,382				
Turnout		87.79%	92.81%	91.52%	90.19%	92.10%	91.30%	90.28%	91.09%	91.68%	89.10%	86.78%	85.35%	91.40%	92.76%	90.77%	90.68%				

The following candidates were elected: Karl Boo (C); Kjell-Olof Feldt (S); Margareta Gard (M); Lars-Ove Hagberg (VPK); Birgitta Hambraeus (C); Inger Hestvik (S); Ove Karlsson (S); Björn Körlof (M); Yngve Nyquist (S); Rolf Rämgård (C); Bo Södersten (S); and Iréne Vestlund (S).

==== 1970s ====
===== 1979 =====
Results of the 1979 general election held on 16 September 1979:

Party		Votes per municipality															Total votes	%	Seats		
Party		Älv- dalen	Avesta	Bor- länge	Falun	Gagnef	Hede- mora	Lek- sand	Lud- vika	Malung	Mora	Orsa	Rättvik	Säter	Smedje- backen	Vans- bro	Total votes	%	Con.	Lev.	Tot.
Swedish Social Democratic Party	S	2,334	10,254	16,287	12,802	2,727	5,602	3,276	12,835	3,972	4,908	1,924	2,630	2,873	5,426	2,625	90,475	47.64%	5	1	6
Centre Party	C	2,055	3,514	5,534	8,083	2,044	2,711	2,846	2,869	2,256	4,213	1,378	2,414	2,330	1,455	1,835	45,537	23.98%	3	0	3
Moderate Party	M	504	1,691	3,696	6,616	736	1,416	1,705	2,374	1,017	1,880	736	1,246	905	804	660	25,986	13.68%	2	0	2
Liberal People's Party	FP	384	1,107	2,247	3,404	418	773	821	1,373	607	780	326	575	418	534	308	14,075	7.41%	1	0	1
Left Party – Communists	VPK	197	1,019	1,645	1,624	225	493	232	1,882	361	469	258	292	294	464	296	9,751	5.13%	0	1	1
Christian Democratic Unity	KDS	93	304	376	397	153	176	270	230	92	132	92	116	157	100	208	2,896	1.52%	0	0	0
Communist Party of Sweden	SKP	3	20	54	72	1	48	6	58	6	5	6	4	7	2	1	293	0.15%	0	0	0
Workers' Party – The Communists	APK	0	29	33	8	12	2	13	28	8	24	15	4	6	52	4	238	0.13%	0	0	0
Other parties		18	51	173	99	9	39	33	78	15	28	24	31	17	19	19	653	0.34%	0	0	0
Valid votes		5,588	17,989	30,045	33,105	6,325	11,260	9,202	21,727	8,334	12,439	4,759	7,312	7,007	8,856	5,956	189,904	100.00%	11	2	13
Rejected votes		25	101	245	230	41	79	55	88	34	73	28	38	49	61	39	1,186	0.62%			
Total polled		5,613	18,090	30,290	33,335	6,366	11,339	9,257	21,815	8,368	12,512	4,787	7,350	7,056	8,917	5,995	191,090	89.74%			
Registered electors		6,548	19,699	33,564	37,409	7,019	12,535	10,317	24,225	9,152	14,246	5,594	8,641	7,806	9,602	6,587	212,944				
Turnout		85.72%	91.83%	90.25%	89.11%	90.70%	90.46%	89.73%	90.05%	91.43%	87.83%	85.57%	85.06%	90.39%	92.87%	91.01%	89.74%				

The following candidates were elected: Karl Boo (C); Bertil Dahlén (FP); Kjell-Olof Feldt (S); Margareta Gard (M); Åke Green (S); Lars-Ove Hagberg (VPK); Birgitta Hambraeus (C); Ove Karlsson (S); Björn Körlof (M); Yngve Nyquist (S); Rolf Rämgård (C); Bo Södersten (S); and Gudrun Sundström (S).

===== 1976 =====
Results of the 1976 general election held on 19 September 1976:

Party		Votes per municipality															Total votes	%	Seats		
Party		Älv- dalen	Avesta	Bor- länge	Falun	Gagnef	Hede- mora	Lek- sand	Lud- vika	Malung	Mora	Orsa	Rättvik	Säter	Smedje- backen	Vans- bro	Total votes	%	Con.	Lev.	Tot.
Swedish Social Democratic Party	S	2,191	10,159	15,955	12,354	2,570	5,416	3,161	12,630	3,915	4,464	1,795	2,475	2,754	5,264	2,566	87,669	46.32%	5	1	6
Centre Party	C	2,339	4,475	7,619	10,012	2,389	3,421	3,441	4,294	2,749	5,031	1,815	2,786	2,792	1,856	2,186	57,205	30.22%	4	0	4
Moderate Party	M	347	1,126	2,389	4,617	389	979	1,051	1,691	704	1,338	459	908	583	548	475	17,604	9.30%	1	0	1
People's Party	F	481	1,170	2,452	3,793	555	767	897	1,393	711	856	363	642	487	501	357	15,425	8.15%	1	0	1
Left Party – Communists	VPK	181	884	1,267	1,248	158	387	178	1,723	268	328	215	269	204	459	269	8,038	4.25%	0	1	1
Christian Democratic Unity	KDS	89	295	392	368	112	173	240	203	93	128	90	104	157	89	165	2,698	1.43%	0	0	0
Communist Party of Sweden	SKP	1	64	71	97	11	55	9	72	14	7	1	10	8	14	2	436	0.23%	0	0	0
Other parties		70	5	21	18	0	5	0	15	0	57	6	8	4	0	2	211	0.11%	0	0	0
Valid votes		5,699	18,178	30,166	32,507	6,184	11,203	8,977	22,021	8,454	12,209	4,744	7,202	6,989	8,731	6,022	189,286	100.00%	11	2	13
Rejected votes		13	82	143	169	29	39	34	94	30	32	17	27	33	23	27	792	0.42%			
Total polled		5,712	18,260	30,309	32,676	6,213	11,242	9,011	22,115	8,484	12,241	4,761	7,229	7,022	8,754	6,049	190,078	90.93%			
Registered electors		6,462	19,792	32,991	36,000	6,685	12,310	9,939	24,472	9,148	13,674	5,436	8,375	7,635	9,466	6,652	209,037				
Turnout		88.39%	92.26%	91.87%	90.77%	92.94%	91.32%	90.66%	90.37%	92.74%	89.52%	87.58%	86.32%	91.97%	92.48%	90.94%	90.93%				

The following candidates were elected: Karl Boo (C); Erik Carlsson (C); Bertil Dahlén (F); Kjell-Olof Feldt (S); Åke Green (S); Lars-Ove Hagberg (VPK); Birgitta Hambraeus (C); Ove Karlsson (S); Sven Mellqvist (S); Yngve Nyquist (S); Rolf Rämgård (C); Gudrun Sundström (S); and Bo Turesson (M).

===== 1973 =====
Results of the 1973 general election held on 16 September 1973:

Party		Votes per municipality															Total votes	%	Seats		
Party		Älv- dalen	Avesta	Bor- länge	Falun	Gagnef	Hede- mora	Lek- sand	Lud- vika	Malung	Mora	Orsa	Rättvik	Säter	Smedje- backen	Vans- bro	Total votes	%	Con.	Lev.	Tot.
Swedish Social Democratic Party	S	2,115	9,487	14,974	12,071	2,419	5,248	3,037	11,901	3,811	4,223	1,646	2,515	2,573	5,082	2,540	83,642	46.96%	5	1	6
Centre Party	C	2,204	4,690	7,889	9,677	2,348	3,300	3,329	4,304	2,582	4,669	1,781	2,731	2,547	1,755	2,225	56,031	31.46%	4	0	4
Moderate Party	M	266	906	1,811	3,839	292	819	806	1,433	620	1,129	387	585	448	417	331	14,089	7.91%	1	0	1
People's Party	F	490	879	1,453	2,792	287	584	732	1,082	688	742	220	546	414	440	296	11,645	6.54%	1	0	1
Left Party – Communists	VPK	249	1,117	1,308	1,160	171	439	161	1,948	272	402	274	307	189	474	342	8,813	4.95%	0	1	1
Christian Democratic Unity	KDS	96	351	453	478	104	209	239	251	111	133	81	170	179	86	182	3,123	1.75%	0	0	0
Communist Party of Sweden	SKP	22	81	78	83	28	47	17	87	11	23	15	9	23	16	12	552	0.31%	0	0	0
Communist League Marxist–Leninists (the revolutionaries)	KFML(r)	2	25	62	35	1	2	6	32	6	5	2	1	2	4	0	185	0.10%	0	0	0
Other parties		0	7	5	0	2	1	2	2	0	1	1	3	1	1	0	26	0.01%	0	0	0
Valid votes		5,444	17,543	28,033	30,135	5,652	10,649	8,329	21,040	8,101	11,327	4,407	6,867	6,376	8,275	5,928	178,106	100.00%	11	2	13
Rejected votes		12	37	66	55	10	20	9	37	11	9	13	5	6	11	7	308	0.17%			
Total polled		5,456	17,580	28,099	30,190	5,662	10,669	8,338	21,077	8,112	11,336	4,420	6,872	6,382	8,286	5,935	178,414	89.89%			
Registered electors		6,317	19,170	30,833	33,837	6,149	11,714	9,307	23,673	8,848	12,791	5,123	8,092	7,047	9,027	6,560	198,488				
Turnout		86.37%	91.71%	91.13%	89.22%	92.08%	91.08%	89.59%	89.03%	91.68%	88.62%	86.28%	84.92%	90.56%	91.79%	90.47%	89.89%				

The following candidates were elected: Karl Boo (C); Erik Carlsson (C); Kjell-Olof Feldt (S); Torsten Fredriksson (S); Åke Green (S); Lars-Ove Hagberg (VPK); Birgitta Hambraeus (C); Anders Jonsson (F); Ove Karlsson (S); Sven Mellqvist (S); Rolf Rämgård (C); Gudrun Sundström (S); and Bo Turesson (M).

===== 1970 =====
Results of the 1970 general election held on 20 September 1970:

Party		Votes	%	Seats		
Party		Votes	%	Con.	Lev.	Tot.
Swedish Social Democratic Party	S	84,858	48.98%	6	0	6
Centre Party	C	46,290	26.72%	3	0	3
People's Party	F	18,706	10.80%	1	0	1
Moderate Party	M	11,457	6.61%	1	0	1
Left Party – Communists	VPK	8,414	4.86%	0	1	1
Christian Democratic Unity	KDS	3,136	1.81%	0	0	0
Communist League Marxists-Leninists	KFML	371	0.21%	0	0	0
Other parties		8	0.00%	0	0	0
Valid votes		173,240	100.00%	11	1	12
Rejected votes		264	0.15%			
Total polled		173,504	87.16%			
Registered electors		199,065				

The following candidates were elected: Karl Boo (C); Erik Carlsson (C); Kjell-Olof Feldt (S); Torsten Fredriksson (S); Åke Green (S); Lars-Ove Hagberg (VPK); Birgitta Hambraeus (C); Anders Jonsson (F); Ove Karlsson (S); Sven Mellqvist (S); Gudrun Sundström (S); and Bo Turesson (M).
