= Marie Olsson =

Swedish politician

Member of the Riksdag
- Incumbent
- Assumed office 15 July 2024
- Constituency: Dalarna County

Personal details
- Born: 27 April 1967 (age 59) Orsa Municipality, Sweden
- Party: Social Democratic

Eva Marie Olsson (born 27 April 1967) is a Swedish politician from the Swedish Social Democratic Party. She has been a member of the parliament since 2024, elected for the Dalarna County constituency.

== Biography ==
Olsson is a trained sociologist. She has previously worked as a manager at the Swedish Public Employment Service. She was the chairwoman of the municipal board in Orsa Municipality from 2008 to 2014, and then an opposition (Oppositionsråd) councillor until 2017. When Hans Unander When Hans Unander left the Riksdag this year, Olsson became the new deputy minister for Peter Hultqvist, which she was between 1 April 2017 and 24 September 2018. In the Riksdag, during this period she was a deputy member of Committee on Environment and Agriculture and the Committee on Social Insurance. After her time in the Riksdag, she held managerial positions in several municipalities.

On 16 July 2024, Olsson took office as a full member of the Riksdag after Sofie Eriksson became a member of the European Parliament. In the Riksdag, Olsson is a member of Committee on Taxation.

== See also ==
- List of members of the Riksdag, 2022–2026
