= Wiklund =

Wiklund is a Swedish surname. It may refer to:

- Adolf Wiklund (musician) (1879–1950), Swedish composer and conductor
- Anders Wiklund (b. 1949), Swedish Left Party politician
- Elis Wiklund (1909–1982), Swedish cross-country skier
- Emma Wiklund (b. 1968), Swedish fashion model and actress
- Gustav Wiklund (b. 1934), Finnish actor and writer
- Hans Wiklund (b. 1964), Swedish journalist, movie critic and TV-show host
- Ragne Wiklund (b. 2000), Norwegian speed skater
