= Katarina Stenström Ros =

Swedish politician (born 1966)

Member of the Riksdag
- Incumbent
- Assumed office 28 September 2026
- Constituency: Dalarna County

Personal details
- Born: 1966 (age 59–60) Falun, Sweden
- Party: Moderate Party

Katarina Elisabet Stenström Ros (born 1966) is a Swedish politician from the Moderate Party. She has been a member of the Riksdag since 2026, elected for the constituency of Dalarna County.

== Professional life ==
Stenström Ros has worked as a chamber prosecutor at the National Unit against Corruption within the Swedish Public Prosecutor's Office. She has also worked as a chamber prosecutor at the Swedish Economic Crime Authority.

== Political career ==
According to her presentation in SVT's election compass 2026, Stenström Ros has had political assignments for the Moderates since 2023.

She began serving as a Deputy Minister in the Riksdag on 28 September 2026, as the substitute for Carl-Oskar Bohlin. Since 6 October 2026, she has been a deputy member of the Committee on the Constitution, the Committee on Environment and Agriculture, and the Committee on Industry and Trade.

== See also ==
- List of members of the Riksdag, 2026–2030
