= Hans Unander =

Swedish politician (born 1970)

Member of the Riksdag
- In office 29 September 2014 – 31 March 2017
- Succeeded by: Patrik Engström
- Constituency: Dalarna County
- In office 14 July 2009 – 4 October 2010
- Preceded by: Marita Ulvskog
- Constituency: Dalarna County

Personal details
- Born: 1970 (age 55–56)
- Party: Social Democratic Party

Hans Erik Unander (born 1970) is a Swedish politician, lawyer and former member of the Riksdag, the national legislature. A member of the Social Democratic Party, he represented Dalarna County between July 2009 and October 2010 and between September 2014 and March 2017. He had previously been a substitute member of the Riksdag four times: September 2002 to September 2004 (for Marita Ulvskog); October 2008 to January 2009 (for Anneli Särnblad); and January 2013 to July 2013 (for Roza Güclü Hedin).

Unander is the son of road worker Sven Erik Unander and finance assistant Ulla U (née Albertsson). He has worked as a school caretaker and a painter. He has been a member of the municipal council in Malung Municipality since 1994.
