= Kerstin-Maria Aronsson =

Swedish politician (born 1937)

Member of the Riksdag
- In office 5 October 1998 – 14 November 2004
- Succeeded by: Jan Lindholm
- Constituency: Dalarna County

Personal details
- Born: Kerstin-Maria Lejdstrand; 8 August 1937 (age 88)
- Party: Green Party
- Spouse(s): Bengt Stalín (m. 1961–1981; his death); Hans Aronsson (m. 2008)

Kerstin-Maria Aronsson (née Lejdstrand; previously Stalín; born 8 August 1937) is a Swedish politician and former member of the Riksdag, the national legislature. A member of the Green Party, she represented Dalarna County between October 1998 and November 2004.

Kerstin-Maria Lejdstrand married Bengt Stalín in 1961. Bengt Stalín died in 1981 but Kerstin-Maria kept the Stalín surname. That name had, however, caused issues for her due to its link with Soviet dictator Joseph Stalin. She married Hans Aronsson in 2008 and, in October 2009, she changed her surname to Aronsson.
