= Pohanka =

Pohanka is a surname. Notable people with the surname include:

- Brian Pohanka (1955–2005), American Civil War author, historian, and preservationist
- Mike Pohanka, American politician
- Ragnhild Pohanka (1932–2021), Swedish politician

== See also ==
- Pohang
