= Per Erik Granström =

Swedish politician (1942–2011)

Member of the Riksdag
- In office 5 October 1991 – 2 October 2006
- Constituency: Dalarna County

Personal details
- Born: 1942
- Died: 24 July 2011 (aged 69)
- Party: Social Democratic Party

Per Erik Granström (1942 – 24 July 2011) was a Swedish politician and member of the Riksdag, the national legislature. A member of the Social Democratic Party, he represented Dalarna County between October 1991 and October 2006. He was also a substitute member of the Riksdag for Odd Engström between September 1991 and October 1991. He died on 24 July 2011 aged 69.
