= Maria Strömkvist =

Swedish politician (born 1964)

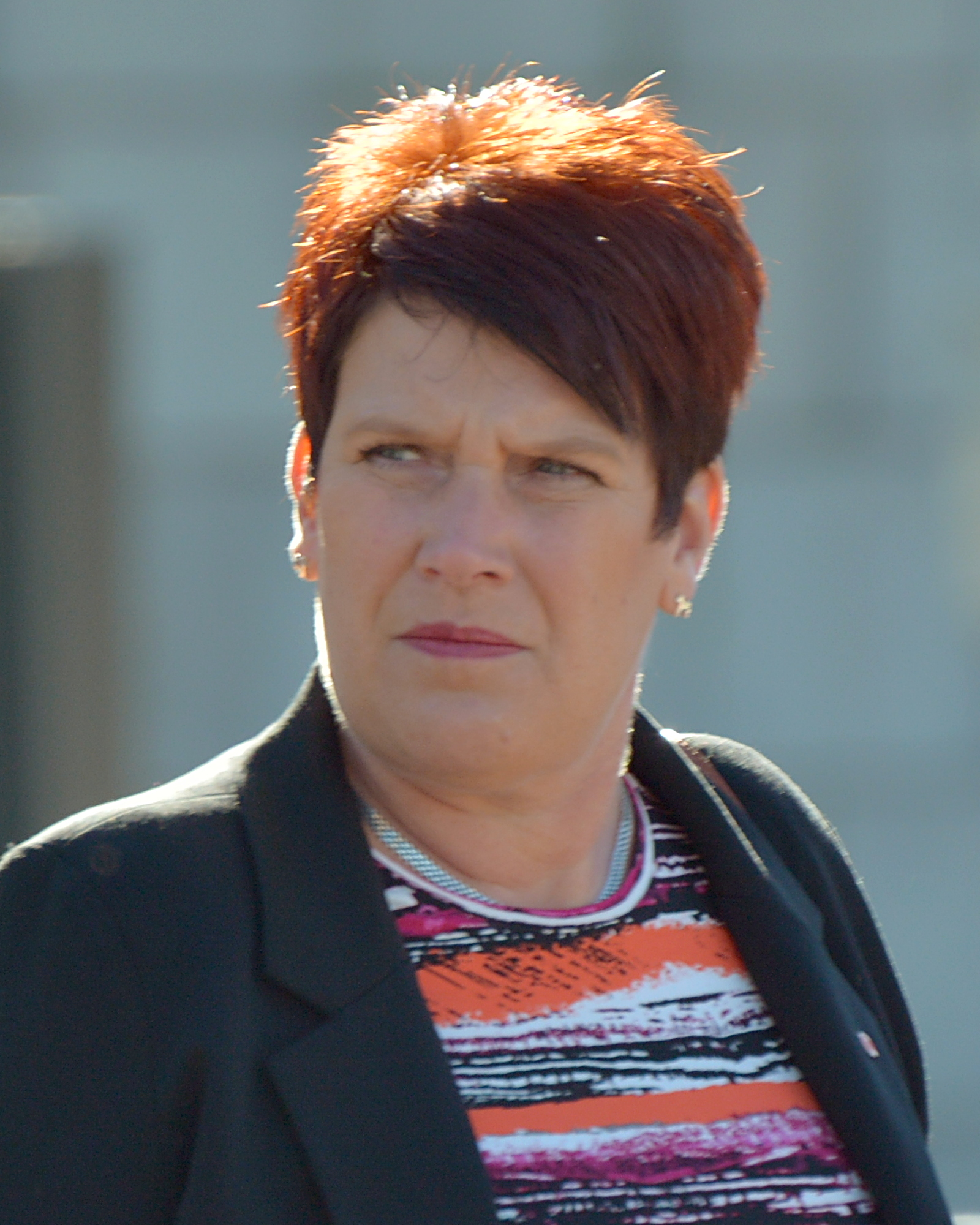
- Strömkvist in September 2018

Member of the Riksdag
- In office 29 September 2014 – 26 September 2022
- Constituency: Dalarna County

Personal details
- Born: Anna Svea Maria Pettersson; 1964 (age 61–62)
- Party: Social Democratic Party

Anna Svea Maria Strömkvist (née Pettersson; born 1964) is a Swedish politician and former member of the Riksdag, the national legislature. A member of the Social Democratic Party, she represented Dalarna County between September 2014 and September 2022.

Strömkvist was educated in Piteå. She worked as a care assistant in Piteå Municipality between 1983 and 1989. She worked for the Swedish Social Democratic Youth League (SSU) in Dalarna between 1989 and 1992. She was a nurse in Ludvika Municipality between 1995 and 1997.
