= Malin Höglund =

Swedish politician (born 1969)

Member of the Riksdag
- In office 31 August 2020 – 1 February 2021
- Constituency: Dalarna County

Personal details
- Born: 13 April 1969 (age 56) Linköping Parish, Östergötland County
- Party: Moderate Party

Malin Kristina Höglund (born 13 April 1969) is a Swedish politician from the Moderate Party who was a member of parliament from 2020 to 2021.

== See also ==
- List of members of the Riksdag, 2018–2022
