= Ulrika Liljeberg =

Swedish politician (born 1969)

Member of the Riksdag
- Incumbent
- Assumed office 26 September 2022
- Constituency: Dalarna County

Personal details
- Born: 1969 (age 56–57)
- Party: Centre Party

Ulrika Liljeberg (born 1969) is a Swedish politician. Since September 2022, she serves as Member of the Riksdag representing the constituency of Dalarna County. She is affiliated with the Centre Party.

Party political offices
Preceded by Martin Ådahl	Second Deputy Leader of the Centre Party; 2023–2025	Succeeded by Ulrika Heie
