= Patrik Engström =

Swedish politician (born 1968)

Member of the Riksdag
- In office 1 April 2017 – 9 January 2022
- Preceded by: Hans Unander
- Succeeded by: Roza Güclü Hedin
- Constituency: Dalarna County

Personal details
- Born: Patrik Olof Mikael Engström; 1968 (age 57–58)
- Party: Social Democratic Party

Patrik Olof Mikael Engström (born 1968) is a Swedish politician, trade unionist and former member of the Riksdag, the national legislature. A member of the Social Democratic Party, he represented Dalarna County between April 2017 and January 2022. He had previously been a substitute member of the Riksdag for Peter Hultqvist between October 2014 and March 2017.

Engström is the son of roadworker Eskil Engström and Irene Engström (née Rosen). He was educated in Avesta. He had various jobs at the Outokumpu site in Avesta between 1986 and 2014. He was a member of the municipal council in Avesta Municipality from 2006 to 2014. He is currently a regional co-ordinator for the IF Metall trade union.
