= Kajsa Fredholm =

Swedish politician (born 1961)

Member of the Riksdag
- Incumbent
- Assumed office 26 September 2022
- Constituency: Dalarna County

Personal details
- Born: 1961 (age 64–65)
- Party: Left Party

Kajsa Fredholm (born 1961) is a Swedish politician. She was elected as Member of the Riksdag in September 2022. She represents the constituency of Dalarna County. She is affiliated with the Left Party.
