= Lars Isacsson =

Swedish politician (born 1970)

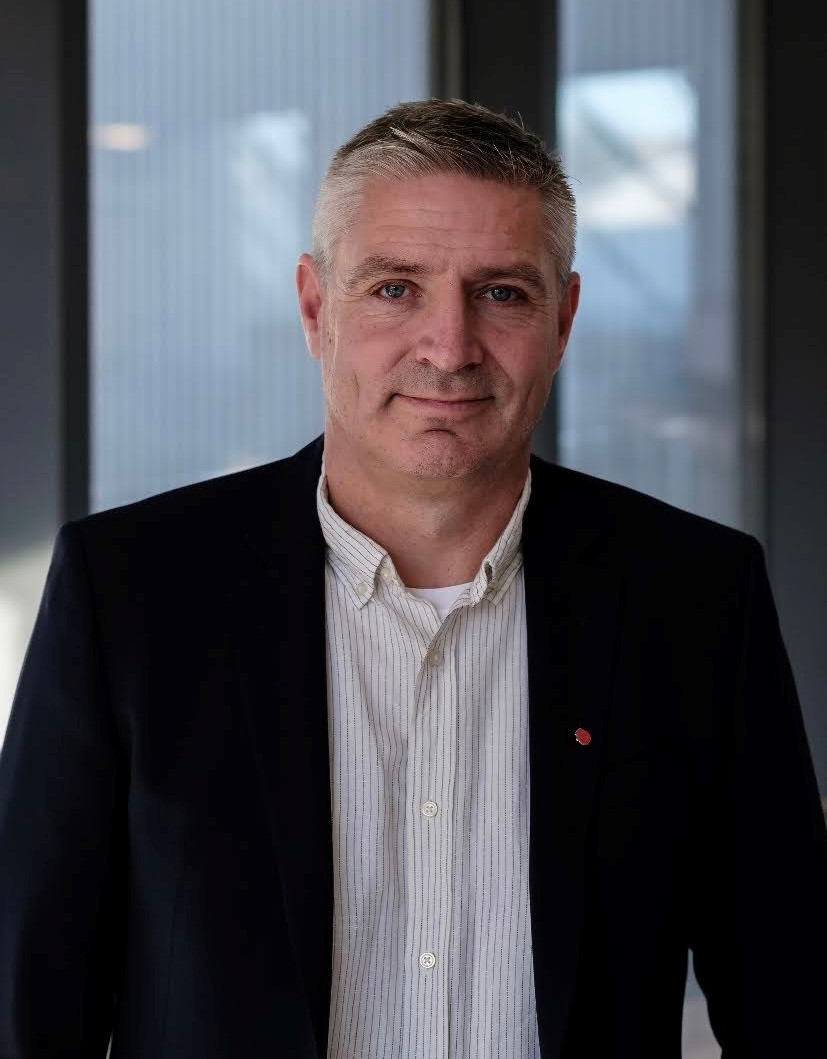
- Isacsson in October 2022

Member of the Riksdag
- Incumbent
- Assumed office 26 September 2022
- Constituency: Dalarna County

Personal details
- Born: Lars Isacsson; 1970 (age 55–56)
- Party: Social Democratic Party

Lars Isacsson or Lars Isaksson (born 1970) is a Swedish politician and member of the Riksdag, the national legislature. A member of the Social Democratic Party, he has represented Dalarna County since September 2022. He had previously been a member of the municipal council in Avesta Municipality.
