= Anna-Lena Blomkvist =

Swedish politician (born 1973)

Member of the Riksdag
- Incumbent
- Assumed office 26 September 2022
- Constituency: Dalarna County

Personal details
- Born: 1973 (age 52–53)
- Party: Sweden Democrats

Anna-Lena Blomkvist (born 1973) is a Swedish politician. She was elected as Member of the Riksdag in September 2022 and represents the constituency of Dalarna County. She is affiliated with the Sweden Democrats.

Blomkvist worked as a nurse and a medical secretary before entering politics. She is also the political secretary and spokeswoman for the Sweden Democrats in Dalarna and is a municipal councilor and group leader on the council for the party in Leksand.
