= Mohamed Abdukardir Ali =

Swedish politician (born 1996)

Mohamed Ali

Member of the Riksdag
- Incumbent
- Assumed office 28 September 2026
- Constituency: Dalarna County

Personal details
- Born: 1996 (age 29–30)
- Party: Left Party

Mohamed Abdukardir Ali (born 1996) is a Swedish politician and Member of the Riksdag. A member of the Left Party, he has represented Dalarna County since September 2026.

Ali was born in 1996. He applied to remain in Sweden in the spring of 2012 and was granted permanent residency in the autumn of 2013. He was given debt relief in 2022. He was denied Swedish citizenship in 2023. His appeal was rejected in September 2024 as, according to the migration court, he had significant debts and therefore did not meet the legal requirement of having an "honest way of life". The debts were unpaid taxes, student loans and private loans. For several years Ali shared an apartment north of Stockholm with two brothers who were prominent figures in the criminal underworld in the area. One of the brothers had spent time in prison for attempted murder. Ali has not been convicted of any crime aside from speeding, though he has been accused of criminal activities for which the investigations were subsequently dropped. Ali reapplied for citizenship in October 2024 and in February 2026 became a Swedish citizen.

== Politics ==
Ali joined the Left Party in 2025. Despite being placed ninth on the Left Party's party list in Dalarna County, Ali was elected to the Riksdag at the 2026 general election as the sole representative for Dalarna after receiving 648 preferential votes. He was one of eight candidates who managed to overcome their party list as a result of the number of preferential votes they received. Right-wing sources attributed Ali's victory to a mobilization of Somali Swede voters.

=== Electoral fraud investigation ===
Prior to the election, police in the region of Bergslagen had been investigating reports that someone had been driving around with ballot papers on which the Ali's name had already been pre-marked. Police surveillance revealed individuals in the car stopping at ATMs to withdraw cash. On 1 September 2026 the police filed a report of electoral fraud with the National Anti-Corruption Unit at the Swedish Prosecution Authority but on 8 September 2026 the investigation was dropped due to insufficient evidence.

The electoral fraud investigation resumed on 13 September 2026 after the county administrative board in Dalarna County, which administers elections, received a report of electoral fraud. Ali has denied any involvement. The Left Party has said that Ali will not take his new seat in the Riksdag when the new legislative term begins on 28 September 2026 but would instead take a leave of absence whilst the investigations were being carried out. According to the Borlänge Tidning, Ali has been offered a position in the Left Party’s parliamentary office in Stockholm on a monthly salary of SEK 81,400 which is same as the base compensation for a member of the Swedish parliament if he gives up his seat.
