= Mathias Bengtsson =

Swedish politician (born 1998)

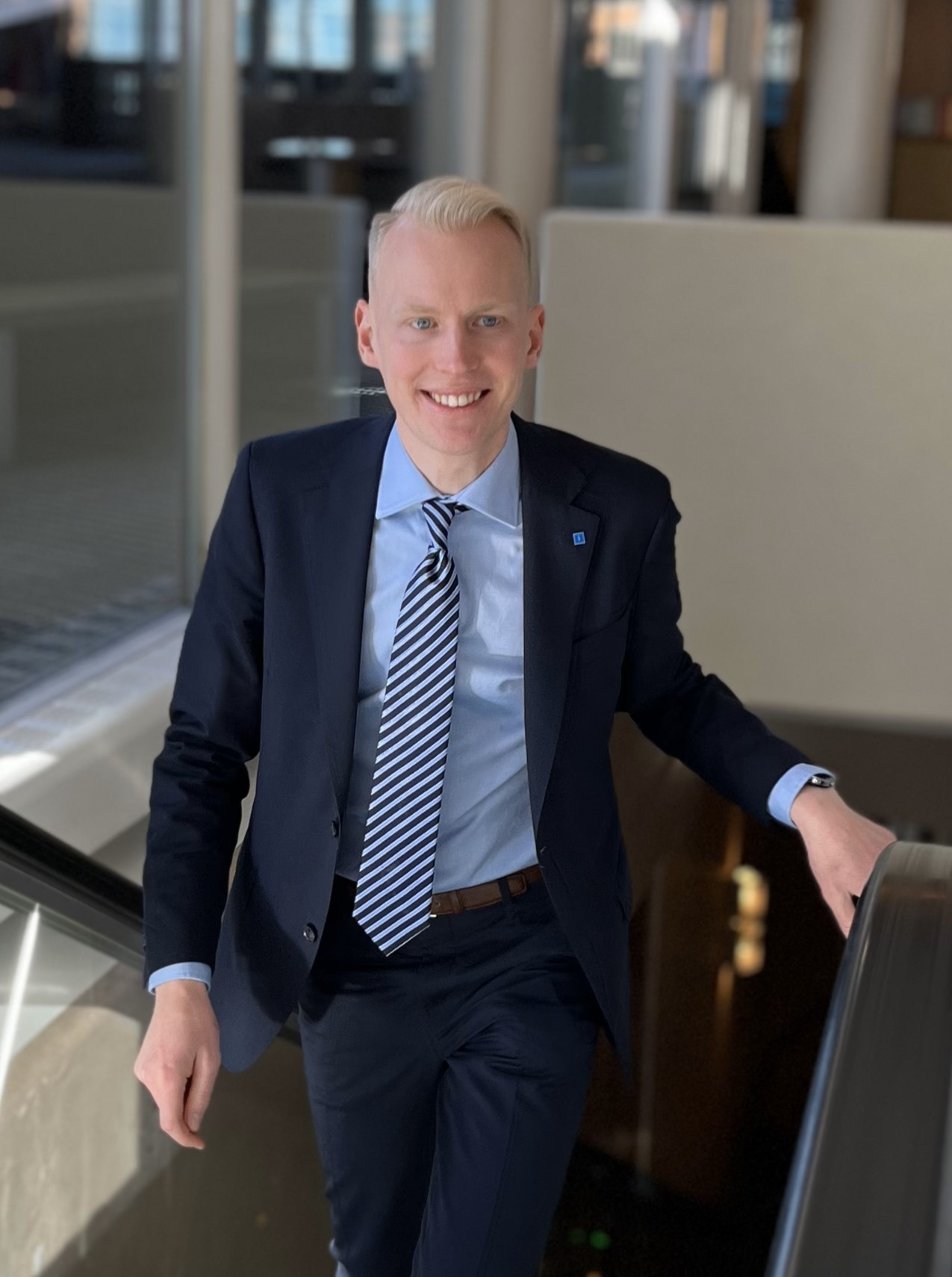
- Bengtsson in 2023

Member of the Riksdag
- Incumbent
- Assumed office 26 September 2022
- Constituency: Dalarna County

Personal details
- Born: 26 April 1998 (age 28)
- Party: Christian Democrats

Mathias Birger Daniel Bengtsson (born 26 April 1998) is a Swedish politician serving as a member of the Riksdag since 2022. From 2015 to 2017, he served as chairman of the Young Christian Democrats in Dalarna County.
