= Mursal Isa =

Member of the Riksdag
- Incumbent
- Assumed office 28 September 2026
- Constituency: Dalarna County

Personal details
- Born: 1981 (age 44–45) Somalia
- Party: Green

Mursal Isa (born 1981) is a Somalia-born Swedish politician from the Green Party. He has been a member of the Riksdag since 2026, elected for the Dalarna County constituency.

== Biography ==
Isa is originally from Somalia and is politically active in Borlänge. He has extensive experience in politics and civil society and has, among other things, been second vice chairman of the culture and leisure committee in Borlänge.

Ahead of the 2026 Swedish general election, Isa was named the top candidate on the Green Party's parliamentary list in Dalarna County. The Green Party received a parliamentary mandate in the constituency and Isa was elected as an ordinary member of parliament. He took office on 28 September 2026.

== See also ==
- List of members of the Riksdag, 2026–2030
