= Carl-Oskar Bohlin =

Swedish politician (born 1986)

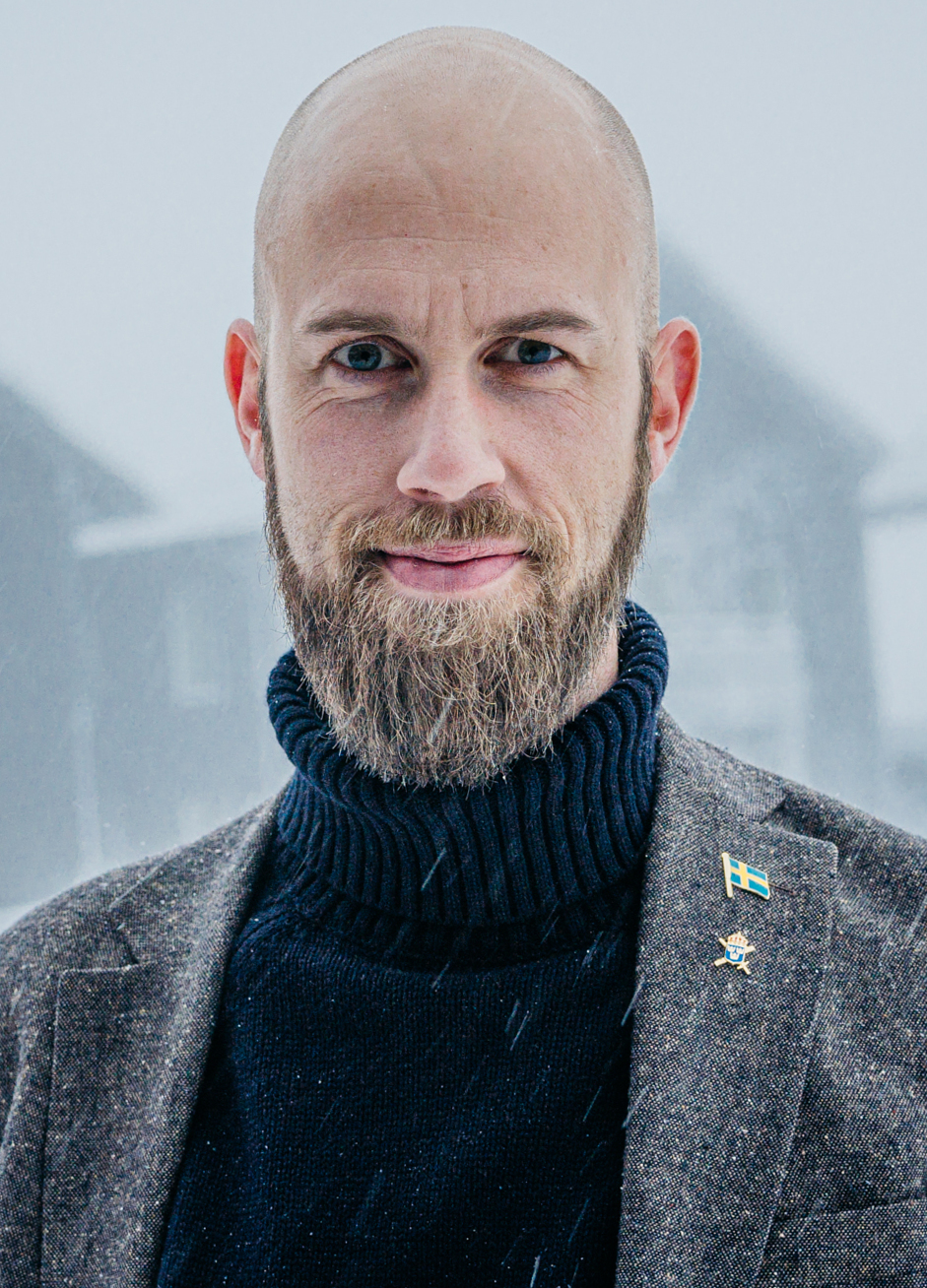
- Bohlin in 2023

Minister for Civil Defence
- Incumbent
- Assumed office 18 October 2022
- Monarch: Carl XVI Gustaf
- Prime Minister: Ulf Kristersson
- Preceded by: New portfolio (Morgan Johansson)

Member of the Riksdag
- Incumbent
- Assumed office 4 October 2010
- Preceded by: Camilla Lindberg
- Constituency: Dalarna County

Personal details
- Born: 8 January 1986 (age 40) Borlänge, Sweden
- Party: Moderate Party
- Spouse: Sara Kristoffersson (m. 2018)
- Children: 2

Carl-Oskar Simon Bohlin (born 8 January 1986) is a Swedish politician who has served as Minister for Civil Defence in the cabinet of Ulf Kristersson since 2022. He is a member of the Moderate Party.

== Early life and education ==
Bohlin is the son of Magnus Bohlin, professor emeritus at Dalarna University, and Ingrid Lindberg Bohlin. He went to junior high school in the Jakobsgårdarna area in Borlänge and then at Falu Frigymnasium in Falun.

He studied law at Uppsala University between 2007 and 2012, but does not have a candidate degree in law.

== Political career ==
Bohlin got involved early in municipal politics in Borlänge and was elected to the municipality's children's and school board at the age of 18. In February 2005, Bohlin was elected chairman of the Moderate Youth League in Dalarna.

He was elected to the Riksdag in the 2010 general election. He was a candidate for the European Parliament in the 2014 European Parliament election but was not elected.

=== Minister for Civil Defence ===
Following 2022 general election, Bohlin was appointed Minister for Civil Defence (the first since 1947) and cabinet minister in the Ministry of Defence in the cabinet of Ulf Kristersson. The ministerial portfolio also includes responsibility for crisis management and civil protection.

== Personal life ==
He is married to Sara Kristoffersson (b. 1986) and has two children.

== Honours ==
- Finland: Commander Grand Cross of the Order of the Lion of Finland (23 April 2024)

== Politics ==
In February 2019, the Moderate Party appointed Bohlin acting chairman of the Riksdag Committee on Industry and Trade after the regular chairman, Lars Hjälmered, went on paternity leave. In May 2019, Bohlin became the Moderate Party's new spokesperson for housing policy. In January 2022, it was reported that Bohlin would leave housing policy in mid-February to become chairman of the Committee on Industry and Trade, with responsibility for industry and energy policy.
