= Ulf Berg =

Swedish politician (born 1957)

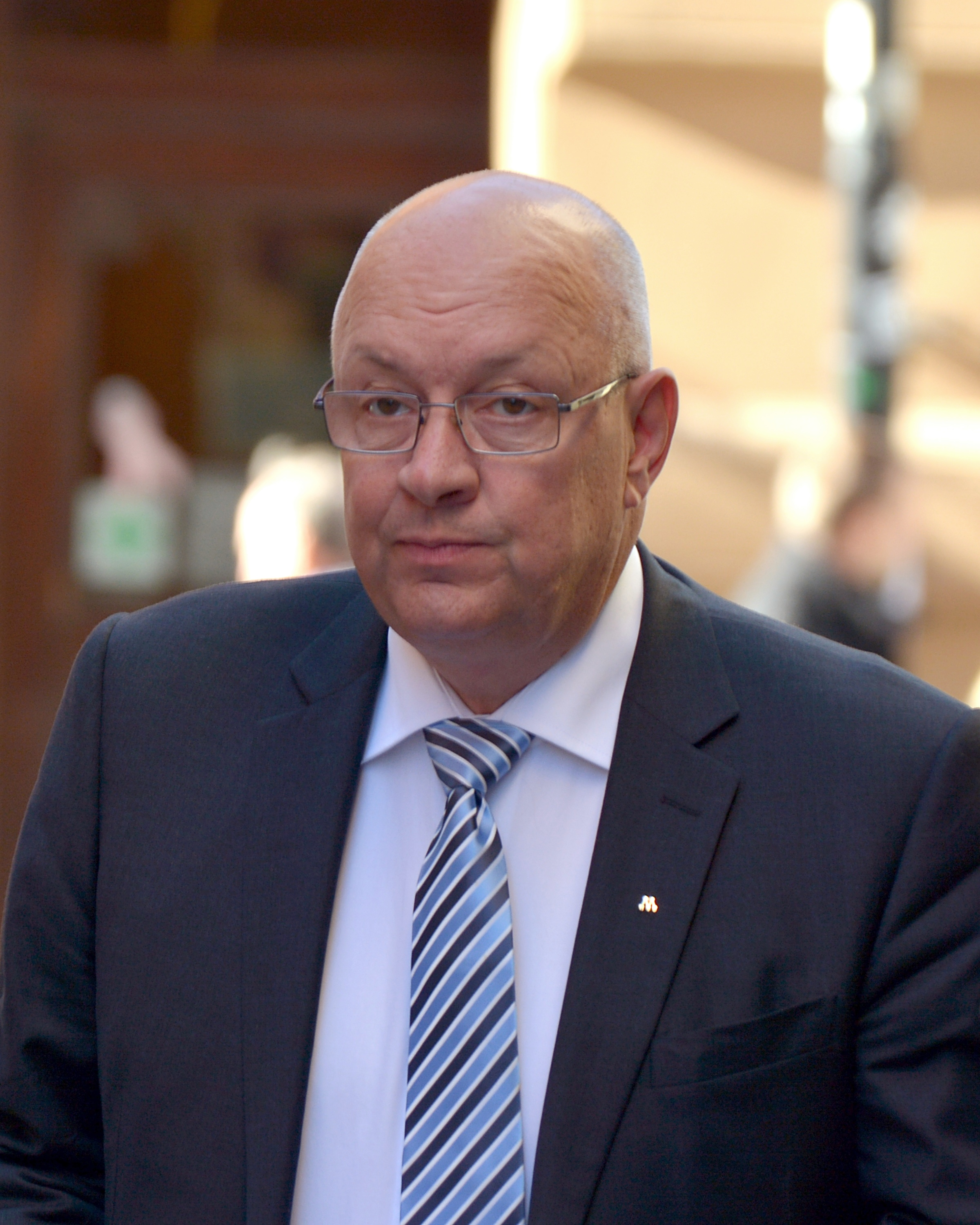

member of the Riksdag
- In office 2006–2016

president of the Dalarna County Executive Board

Personal details
- Political party: Moderate Party

Ulf Berg (born 1957) is a Swedish politician of the Moderate Party. He was a member of the Riksdag from 2006 to 2016, representing Dalarna County. Following the 2014 elections, he became his party's spokesperson on rural affairs.

After ten years in the Riksdag, Berg chose to step back from national politics and from September 2016 to October 2018, he was one of the two opposition leaders of the Moderate Party in the Dalarna County Council. Since October 2018, Berg is president of the Dalarna County Executive Board after ending 92 years of unbroken Social Democratic rule.

Berg had previously sat in Avesta municipal council.
