= Kenneth Johansson =

Swedish politician (1956–2021)

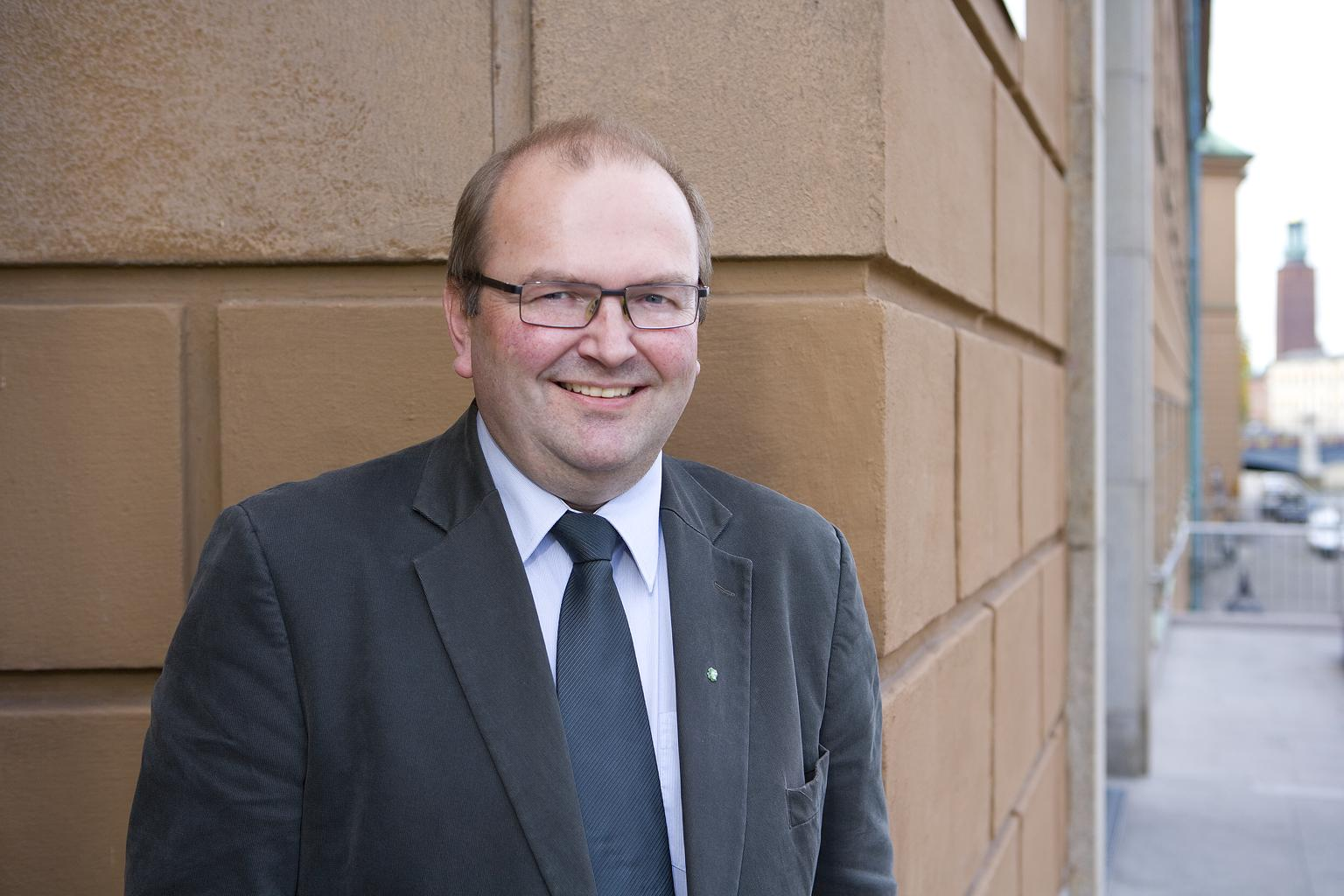
- Portrait of Kenneth Johansson

Governor of Värmland County
- In office 1 October 2012 – 31 December 2018
- Appointed by: Reinfeldt Cabinet
- Preceded by: Eva Eriksson
- Succeeded by: Johan Blom (acting)

Member of the Swedish Riksdag for Dalarna County
- In office 1998–2012

Personal details
- Born: 2 May 1956 Avesta, Sweden
- Died: 31 July 2021 (aged 65)
- Party: Centre Party
- Spouse: Johanna Tunhammar

John Per Kenneth Johansson (2 May 1956 – 31 July 2021) was a Swedish Centre Party politician who was the governor of Värmland County between 2012 and 2018. He was a member of the Riksdag, from 1998 to 2012.
