= Liselotte Forsberg =

Swedish politician

Member of the Riksdag
- Incumbent
- Assumed office 28 September 2026
- Constituency: Dalarna County

Personal details
- Born: 1972 (age 53–54)
- Party: Sweden Democrats

Liselotte Forsberg (born 1972) is a Swedish politician for the Sweden Democrats. She has been a member of the Riksdag since 2026, elected for the Dalarna County constituency.

== See also ==
- List of members of the Riksdag, 2026–2030
