= Camilla Lindberg =

Swedish politician (born 1973)

Camilla Lindberg (born 1973) is a Swedish politician who belonged to the Liberal People's Party from 2006 to 2010. She was not re-elected in the 2010 election. She was a member of the Riksdag from the district of Dalarna County since 2006. In her youth, Lindberg was an active participant in the Swedish Libertarian network Frihetsfronten ("The Freedom Front"), and was a friend of later author Johan Norberg.

== Anti-surveillance stand ==
She is known for being the only Liberal People's Party politician, and the only politician outside the Red-Greens, to vote against the legislative change regulating the National Defence Radio Establishment (FRA) on 18 June 2008. For her determination in the question she was awarded the Bertil Ohlin-medal on 9 August 2008 by the Swedish Liberal Youth League during a formal reception which among others former Prime Minister of Sweden, Ola Ullsten attended.

== Sex work campaign ==
Another controversy involves taking a stand against the dominant discourse on prostitution (in 1999 a coalition of Social Democrats, Greens and leftists outlawed the buying but not the selling of sexual services, as a form of violence against women, and this view is now accepted among the whole political spectrum). Lindberg claimed that the “story of the tragic woman who is exploited” is one that is not entirely true, and that the state should differentiate between voluntary and forced prostitution, and should license brothels. She also claimed that the most common form of prostitution was “men selling sex to men”. Originally she gave an interview to a local paper in Dalarna, but it was taken up by the national press, and soon went round the world. Her stance puts her at odds with the left, and she was also criticized from the right: such as Christian Democrat Katarina Gustavsson who stated that to the contrary, Sweden must export its purchasing law to the rest of Europe. Another critic was Magdalena Andersson, President of the Moderate Women in the Riksdag. However despite this, although 2010 was an election year, she found quite a bit of support. However Alexander Bard is known to be a strong supporter of Lindberg.
