= Roza Güclü Hedin =

Swedish politician (born 1982)

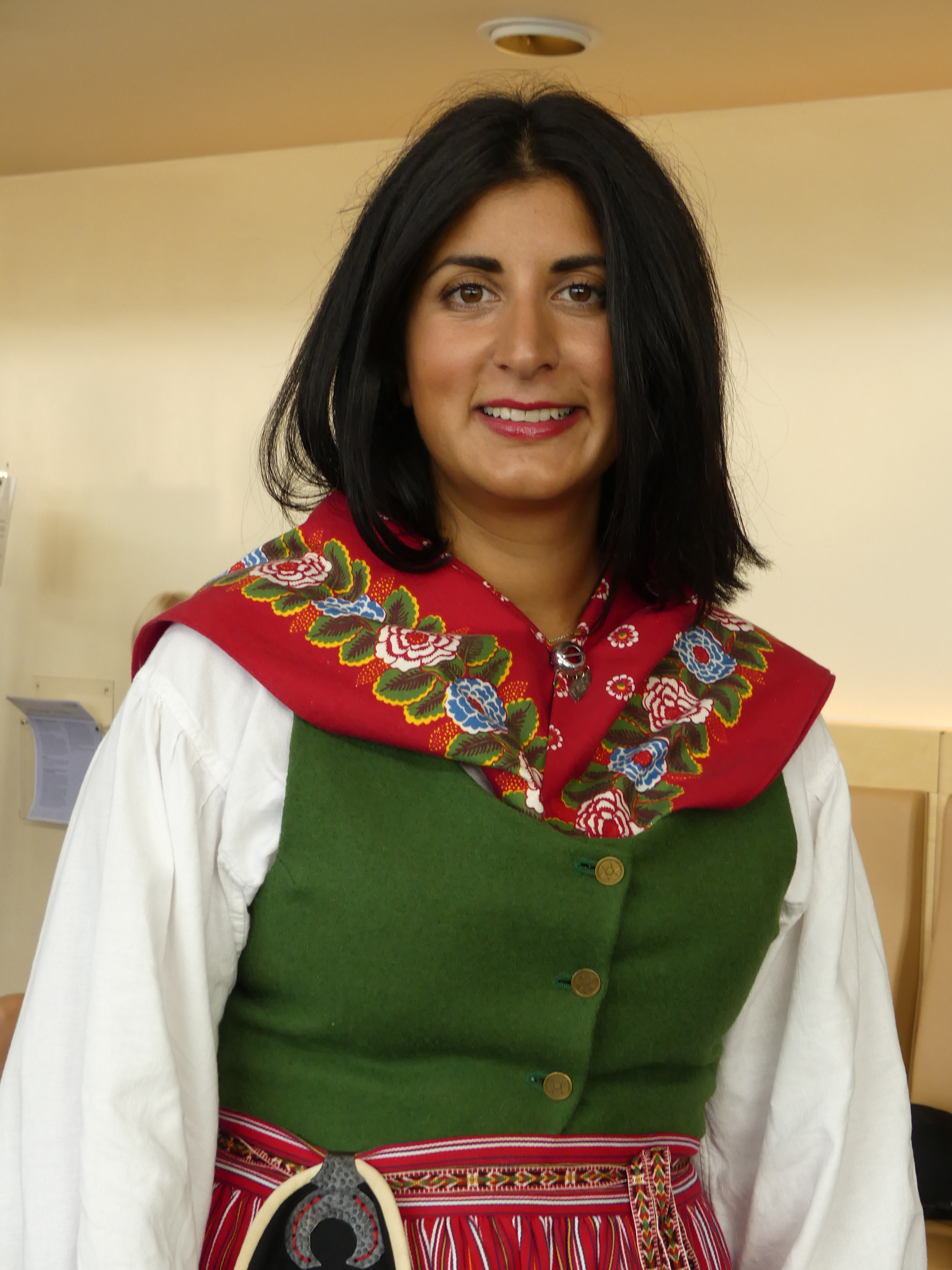
- Güclü Hedin in September 2016

Member of the Riksdag
- In office 1 January 2020 – 26 September 2022
- Preceded by: Patrik Engström
- Constituency: Dalarna County
- In office 4 October 2010 – 24 September 2018
- Constituency: Dalarna County

Personal details
- Born: 1982 (age 43–44)
- Party: Social Democratic Party
- Education: Dalarna University College

Roza Güclü Hedin (born 1982) is a Swedish politician and former member of the Riksdag, the national legislature. A member of the Social Democratic Party, she represented Dalarna County between October 2010 and September 2018, and between January 2020 and September 2022. She has been a substitute member of the Riksdag for Peter Hultqvist twice: September 2018 to January 2022 and September 2022 to October 2022.

Güclü Hedin is the daughter of teachers Mustafa and Gülay Güçlü. She is of Kurdish descent. She was educated in Falun and studied tourism at Dalarna University College. She has worked as a social secretary in Falun Municipality since 2006. She was a member of the municipal council in Falun Municipality from 2006 to 2010.
