= Anders Wiklund =

Swedish politician (born 1949)

Anders Wiklund (born 1 May 1949) is a Swedish Left Party politician, member of the Riksdag 2002–2006 representing Dalarna County.

Wiklund was born in Borlänge.
