= Sofie Eriksson =

Swedish politician (born 1992)

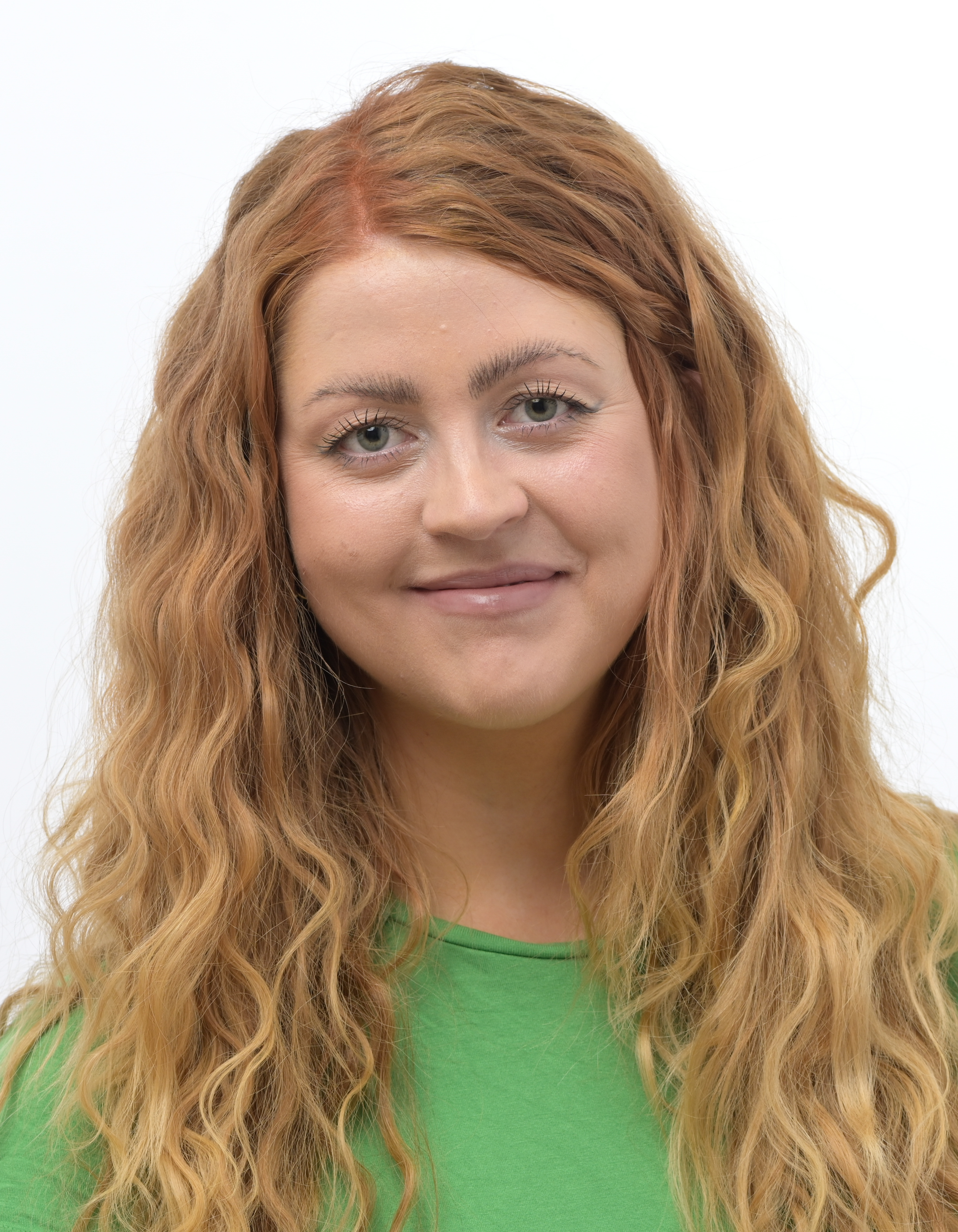

Member of European Parliament
- Incumbent
- Assumed office 16 July 2024
- Constituency: Sweden

Member of the Riksdag
- In office 10 January 2022 – 16 July 2024
- Constituency: Dalarna County

Personal details
- Born: 13 December 1992 (age 33) Gävle, Sweden
- Party: Social Democrats

Sofie Eriksson (born 13 December 1992) is a Swedish politician. She is a Member of European Parliament for Sweden since July 2024, having been elected in the 2024 European election.

She was a Member of the Riksdag from January 2022 to July 2024, representing Dalarna County She is affiliated with the Social Democrats, part of the Progressive Alliance of Socialists and Democrats.

In November 2026, the Dala horse became the first Swedish product to be registered under the European Union's geographical indication scheme for craft and industrial products. Eriksson supported efforts to secure the designation bringing the manufacturers together and worked with them to obtain the protection.
