= Rolf Gunnarsson =

Swedish politician (born 1946)

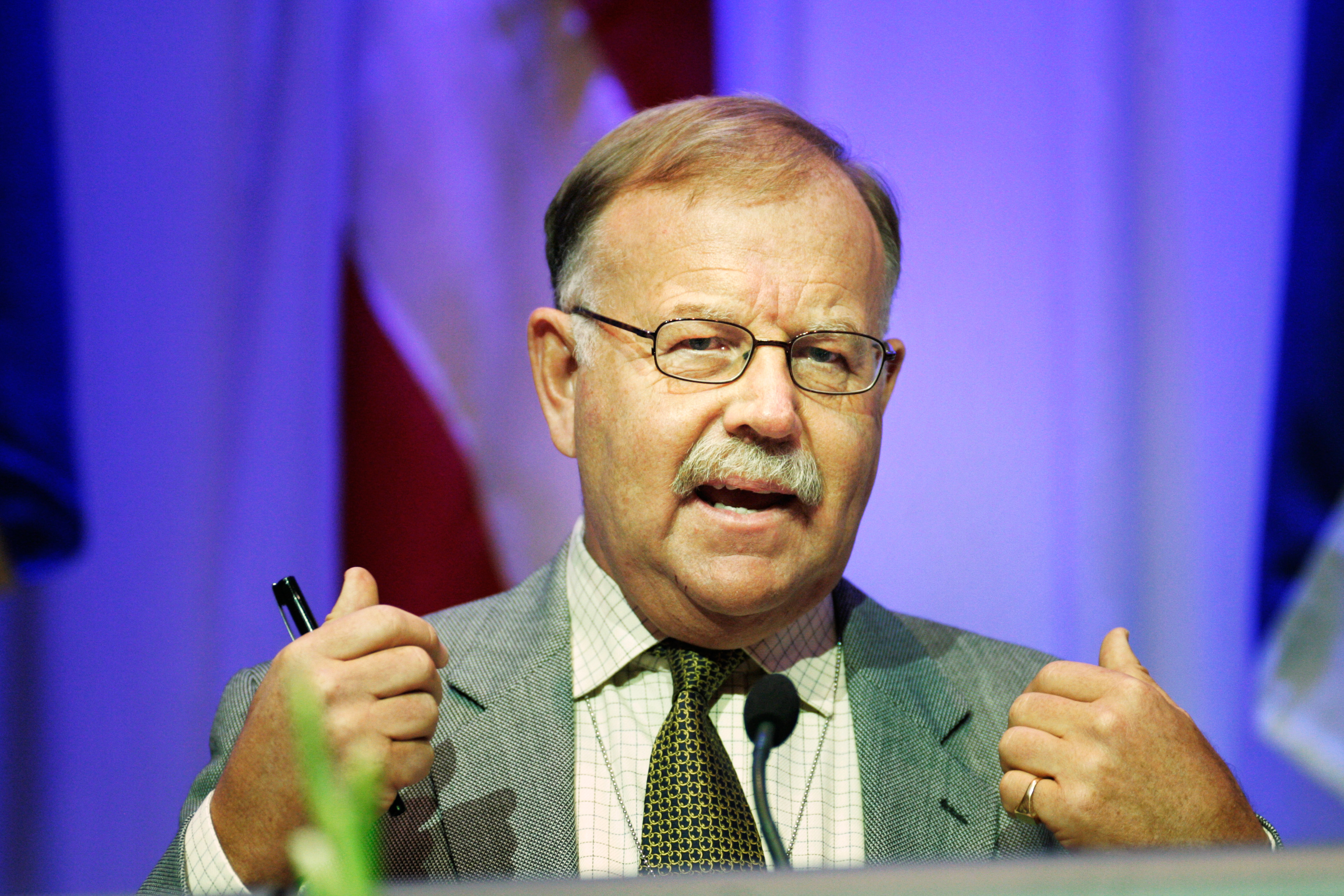

Rolf Gunnarsson (born May 7, 1946) is a Swedish former politician of the Moderate Party. He was a member of the Riksdag from 1994 to 2010.
