= Ragnhild Pohanka =

Swedish politician (1932–2021)

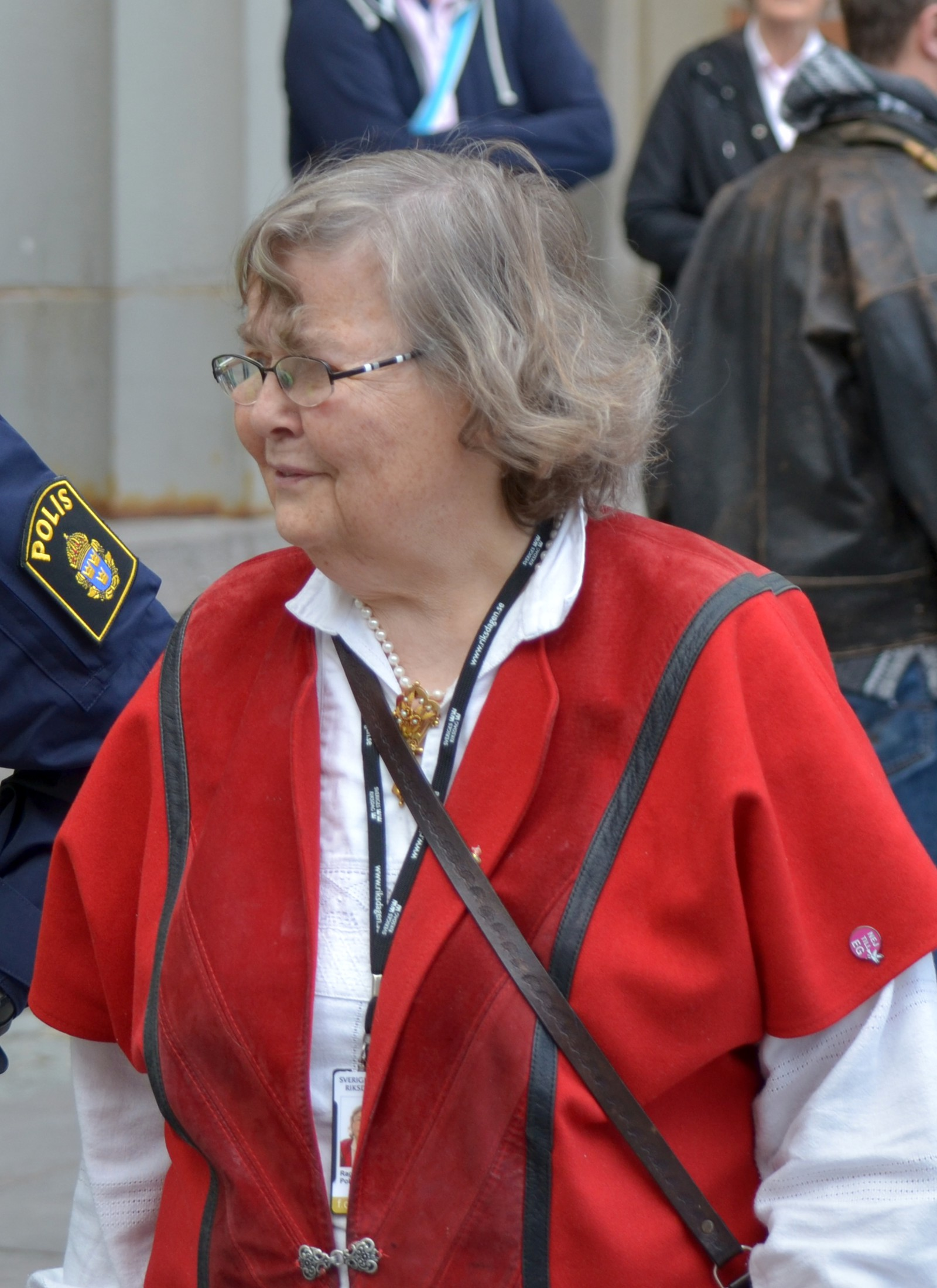
- Pohanka in 2012

Member of the Riksdag
- In office 1994–1998
- Constituency: Dalarna County
- In office 1988–1991
- Constituency: Dalarna County

Spokesperson of the Green Party
- In office 1984–1986
- Preceded by: position established
- Succeeded by: Eva Goës

Personal details
- Born: Ragnhild Louise Margareta Krapf; 31 May 1932 Stockholm Sweden
- Died: 18 November 2021 (aged 89)
- Party: MP (1981–2002); V (2002–2021)

Ragnhild Pohanka (31 May 1932 – 18 November 2021) was a Swedish politician. A member of the Green Party and later the Left Party, she served in the Riksdag from 1988 to 1991 and again from 1994 to 1998.

In 1984, Ragnhild Pohanka and Per Gahrton were appointed the first spokespersons of the Swedish Green Party.
