= Barbro Hietala Nordlund =

Swedish politician (born 1946)

Barbro Hietala Nordlund, born 1946, is a Swedish Social Democratic Party politician, member of the Riksdag first 1994–1998 and then again 2001–2006.
