= Lennart Fremling =

Swedish politician

Lennart Fremling (1946–2013) was a Swedish Liberal People's Party politician, member of the Riksdag 1991–1998 and again 2002–2006.
