= Birgitta Hambraeus =

Swedish politician

Sigrid Birgitta Hambraeus (born 11 April 1930, in Västerås, Sweden) is a former Swedish politician for the Centre Party who was a MEP for the party between 1971 and 1998. As a politician she was active against nuclear power and Sweden's membership in the European Union. In spite of the many years working for the Centre Party, including around 28 years in Riksdagen, the Swedish parliament, she changed party to the Social Democrats in her older years, something she explained in the socialist/leftist Swedish magazine Dagens ETC 2020.

== Bibliography ==
- 1976 - Vad kan du och jag göra åt framtiden?: utgångspunkter för en konstruktiv debatt
- 1992 - Ett fritt, öppet Sverige: vårt samarbete med EG
- 1996 - Kamp mot kärnkraften
- 2009 - Att göra uppror i riksdagen (autobiography)
- 2017 - Att göra bokslut
