= Jan Lindholm =

Swedish politician (born 1951)

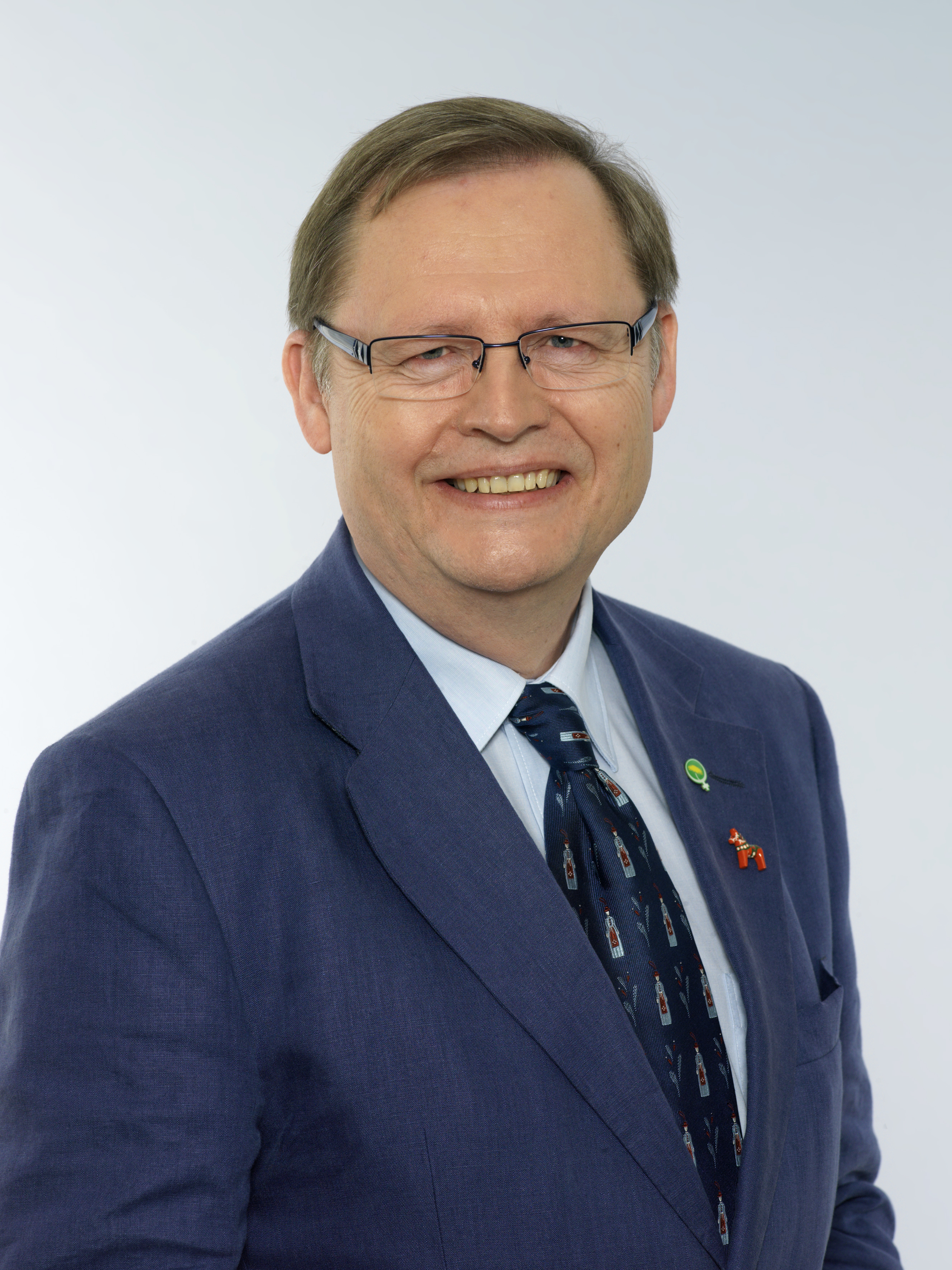
Jan Lindholm

Jan Lindholm (born 1951) is a Swedish Green Party politician, member of the Riksdag since 2004.
