= Anneli Särnblad =

Swedish politician

Anneli Särnblad, born 1968, is a Swedish social democratic politician who has been a member of the Riksdag since 2002.
