= Finkarby =

- Location within Stockholm Location within Sweden
- Coordinates: 59°13′N 17°19′E
- Country: Sweden
- Province: Södermanland
- County: Stockholm County
- Municipality: Nykvarn Municipality

Area
  - Total: 0.53 km^{2} (0.20 sq mi)

Population (31 December 2020)
  - Total: 220
  - Density: 420/km^{2} (1,100/sq mi)
- Time zone: UTC+1 (CET)
  - Summer (DST): UTC+2 (CEST)

Finkarby is a locality situated in Nykvarn Municipality, Stockholm County, Sweden with 214 inhabitants in 2010.
