= Results of the 2002 Swedish general election =

Sweden held a general election on 15 September 2002.

== National results ==
Party	Votes	%	Seats			
Party	Votes	%	Con.	Lev.	Tot.	+/–
Swedish Social Democratic Party	2,113,560	39.85	142	2	144	+13
Moderate Party	809,041	15.26	50	5	55	−27
Liberal People's Party	710,312	13.39	44	4	48	+31
Christian Democrats	485,235	9.15	29	4	33	−9
Left Party	444,854	8.39	23	7	30	−13
Centre Party	328,428	6.19	16	6	22	+4
Green Party	246,392	4.65	6	11	17	+1
Sweden Democrats	76,300	1.44	0	0	0	0
Swedish Senior Citizen Interest Party	37,573	0.71	0	0	0	0
Norrbotten Party	14,854	0.28	0	0	0	–
New Future	9,337	0.18	0	0	0	0
National Democrats	9,248	0.17	0	0	0	New
Scania Party	4,564	0.09	0	0	0	–
Socialist Party	3,213	0.06	0	0	0	0
New Democracy (Note: New Democracy had been dissolved in 2000 but received its votes as write-ins.)	2,207	0.04	0	0	0	0
Socialist Justice Party	1,519	0.03	0	0	0	0
Communist Party	1,182	0.02	0	0	0	0
Unity	603	0.01	0	0	0	0
Free List	502	0.01	0	0	0	–
Voice of the Free People	207	0.00	0	0	0	–
European Workers Party	163	0.00	0	0	0	–
Welfare Party	94	0.00	0	0	0	–
National Democratic Party	87	0.00	0	0	0	–
Alliance Party	58	0.00	0	0	0	–
Skåne Federalists	52	0.00	0	0	0	–
Communist League	46	0.00	0	0	0	–
Citizens Party	27	0.00	0	0	0	–
Rikshushållarna	17	0.00	0	0	0	–
Republicans	15	0.00	0	0	0	–
Tax Reformists	14	0.00	0	0	0	–
Popular Democrats	12	0.00	0	0	0	–
Populist Party	11	0.00	0	0	0	–
New Swedes D.P.N.S.	11	0.00	0	0	0	–
Donald Duck Party	10	0.00	0	0	0	–
Other parties	3,464	0.07	0	0	0	–
Total	5,303,212	100.00	310	39	349	0
Valid votes	5,303,212	98.47				
Invalid/blank votes	82,218	1.53				
Total votes	5,385,430	100.00				
Registered voters/turnout	6,722,163	80.11				
Source: Val

== Regional results ==
=== Percentage share ===
Location	Turnout	Share	Votes	S	M	FP	KD	V	C	MP	SD	Other	Left	Right
Götaland	80.1	48.1	2,551,728	39.5	15.5	12.8	10.6	7.4	6.4	4.2	1.9	1.6	51.2	45.3
Svealand	80.4	38.6	2,048,372	37.9	17.4	15.7	8.1	8.6	4.7	5.2	1.2	1.3	51.6	45.9
Norrland	79.4	13.3	703,112	46.8	8.1	8.8	7.0	11.3	9.8	4.6	0.6	3.0	62.7	33.7
Total	80.1	100.0	5,303,212	39.9	15.3	13.4	9.2	8.4	6.2	4.7	1.4	1.7	52.9	44.0
Source: val.se

=== By votes ===
Location	Turnout	Share	Votes	S	M	FP	KD	V	C	MP	SD	Other	Left	Right
Götaland	80.1	48.1	2,551,728	1,008,083	394,937	326,411	269,991	189,510	164,181	108,189	48,542	41,884	1,305,782	1,155,520
Svealand	80.4	38.6	2,048,372	776,094	356,900	322,128	166,316	176,027	95,436	106,102	23,602	25,767	1,058,223	940,780
Norrland	79.4	13.3	703,112	329,383	57,204	61,773	48,928	79,317	68,811	32,101	4,156	21,439	440,801	236,716
Total	80.1	100.0	5,303,212	2,113,560	809,041	710,312	485,235	444,854	328,428	246,392	76,300	89,090	2,804,806	2,333,016
Source: val.se

== Results by statistical area ==
=== Percentage share ===
Location	Share	Votes	S	M	FP	KD	V	C	MP	SD	Other	Left	Right
East Middle Sweden	16.9	895,681	43.4	13.4	12.7	9.2	8.0	6.1	4.8	1.2	1.4	56.2	41.3
Middle Norrland	4.3	227,831	47.7	9.0	8.6	6.7	10.3	11.5	4.2	0.7	1.3	62.2	35.8
North Middle Sweden	9.3	493,359	44.0	11.1	10.4	7.7	9.8	9.8	4.4	1.2	1.5	58.2	39.1
Småland & Islands	9.2	485,272	41.1	13.1	9.1	14.5	6.7	9.7	3.7	1.1	1.1	51.5	46.4
South Sweden	14.3	759,790	40.5	17.5	13.5	7.9	6.3	4.6	3.8	3.5	2.4	50.6	43.4
Stockholm County	20.3	1,075,192	32.6	21.8	18.9	7.9	8.7	2.3	5.7	1.0	1.2	46.9	50.9
Upper Norrland	5.9	310,347	47.2	6.9	8.3	6.9	12.1	8.2	4.8	0.3	5.4	64.1	30.2
West Sweden	19.9	1,055,740	37.4	15.3	14.2	9.6	8.6	6.4	4.7	1.4	1.3	50.7	46.7
Total	100.0	5,303,212	39.9	15.3	13.4	9.2	8.4	6.2	4.7	1.4	1.7	52.9	44.0
Source: val.se

=== By votes ===
Location	Share	Votes	S	M	FP	KD	V	C	MP	SD	Other	Left	Right
East Middle Sweden	16.9	895,681	388,758	119,805	113,944	82,537	71,343	54,850	42,909	10,607	12,377	503,010	369,687
Middle Norrland	4.3	227,831	108,742	20,434	19,543	15,324	23,371	26,271	9,639	1,488	3,019	141,752	81,572
North Middle Sweden	9.3	493,359	217,234	54,841	51,391	38,142	48,255	48,441	21,658	5,765	7,632	287,147	192,815
Småland & Islands	9.2	485,272	199,479	63,606	44,082	70,365	32,711	46,983	17,862	5,168	5,016	250,052	225,036
South Sweden	14.3	759,790	307,927	132,681	102,389	60,164	47,668	34,616	29,012	26,866	18,467	384,607	329,850
Stockholm County	20.3	1,075,192	350,200	234,661	202,995	85,100	93,063	24,586	61,032	11,091	12,464	504,295	547,342
Upper Norrland	5.9	310,347	146,486	21,290	25,682	21,374	37,534	25,353	15,011	964	16,653	199,031	93,699
West Sweden	19.9	1,055,740	394,734	161,723	150,286	101,678	90,909	67,328	49,269	14,351	13,462	534,912	493,015
Total	100.0	5,303,212	2,113,560	809,041	710,312	485,235	444,854	328,428	246,392	76,300	89,090	2,804,806	2,333,016
Source: val.se

== Constituency results ==
=== Percentage share ===
Constituency	Land	Turnout	Share	Votes	S	M	FP	V	KD	C	MP	SD	Other	Left	Right	Margin
Constituency		%	%		%	%	%	%	%	%	%	%	%	%	%	
Blekinge	G	82.3	1.8	94,558	45.7	13.2	11.1	8.8	8.3	6.1	3.8	2.8	0.3	57.8	39.2	17,603
Dalarna	S	77.7	3.1	163,012	43.8	11.6	9.7	7.7	9.5	9.9	4.7	1.1	2.1	57.9	38.9	31,104
Gothenburg	G	77.5	5.1	273,056	33.2	17.4	18.0	8.6	11.9	1.9	6.5	1.6	1.0	51.5	45.9	15,202
Gotland	G	79.0	0.6	34,336	40.8	14.0	7.9	6.5	8.5	15.6	5.5	0.6	0.5	54.8	44.0	3,715
Gävleborg	N	77.6	3.1	164,934	45.0	9.4	10.0	7.4	11.2	10.4	4.5	1.0	1.1	60.6	37.3	38,573
Halland	G	81.5	3.2	168,247	35.8	17.4	13.9	9.9	5.9	9.5	3.9	1.0	2.6	45.7	50.7	8,439
Jämtland	N	77.8	1.4	76,865	44.6	9.9	7.2	5.0	11.0	15.2	5.2	0.3	1.6	60.7	37.4	17,952
Jönköping	G	82.1	3.8	198,982	39.5	12.7	9.0	20.3	5.7	7.3	3.2	1.0	1.2	48.5	49.3	1,584
Kalmar	G	80.7	2.7	144,228	43.7	12.7	8.9	11.2	7.3	10.6	3.6	0.8	1.1	54.6	43.5	16,150
Kronoberg	G	80.9	2.0	107,726	40.6	14.1	9.8	10.9	7.3	10.9	4.0	1.7	0.8	51.9	45.7	6,735
Malmö	G	76.0	2.8	147,134	42.4	16.5	13.8	5.3	7.6	1.2	4.3	3.8	5.3	54.2	36.7	25,769
Norrbotten	N	80.7	2.9	154,978	47.9	7.2	6.5	5.3	12.7	5.1	5.2	0.3	9.7	65.9	24.1	64,735
Skåne NE	G	77.6	3.2	169,421	39.2	17.7	11.7	11.0	5.6	7.1	3.5	2.8	1.4	48.4	47.4	1,657
Skåne S	G	82.5	3.7	198,228	38.1	20.0	15.8	6.7	5.5	4.2	4.1	3.7	2.1	47.6	46.6	1,987
Skåne W	G	77.3	2.8	150,449	40.2	17.6	13.7	8.1	5.5	4.6	3.3	4.5	2.6	49.0	43.9	7,741
Stockholm	S	80.7	8.6	458,005	31.4	21.0	19.5	6.6	10.9	1.8	6.8	1.0	1.0	49.0	48.9	410
Stockholm County	S	81.1	11.6	617,187	33.5	22.4	18.4	8.9	7.0	2.7	4.9	1.0	1.2	45.3	52.4	43,457
Södermanland	S	80.0	2.9	152,435	47.3	13.1	11.9	8.3	7.1	5.5	4.8	1.0	1.0	59.2	38.8	31,164
Uppsala	S	80.8	3.3	176,402	37.4	15.0	15.6	8.9	8.1	6.8	5.7	1.4	1.0	51.3	46.3	8,745
Värmland	S	79.8	3.1	165,413	43.4	12.4	11.5	8.1	8.7	9.2	4.0	1.4	1.5	56.0	41.1	24,655
Västerbotten	N	80.7	2.9	155,369	46.5	6.5	10.1	8.5	11.5	11.2	4.5	0.3	1.0	62.4	36.3	40,597
Västernorrland	N	79.5	2.8	150,966	49.3	8.5	9.3	7.6	9.9	9.6	3.8	0.8	1.2	63.0	35.0	42,228
Västmanland	S	78.4	2.8	149,321	45.0	12.4	13.3	8.0	8.7	5.7	4.4	1.1	1.4	58.0	39.4	27,829
Västra Götaland E	G	80.5	2.9	153,484	40.8	13.9	10.0	12.3	7.6	9.8	3.7	1.1	0.9	52.1	45.9	9,414
Västra Götaland N	G	80.8	2.9	155,668	41.1	12.1	12.3	11.7	8.5	7.7	4.3	1.4	0.8	54.0	43.8	15,857
Västra Götaland S	G	81.2	2.1	109,469	40.9	13.9	10.9	12.4	7.5	8.0	3.9	1.2	1.3	52.3	45.2	7,729
Västra Götaland W	G	81.2	3.7	195,816	37.0	15.0	16.0	11.7	7.9	5.4	4.3	1.6	1.2	49.2	48.1	2,134
Örebro	S	81.2	3.1	166,597	46.5	10.7	11.2	9.0	8.9	6.4	4.2	1.7	1.2	59.6	37.4	36,993
Östergötland	G	81.1	4.7	250,926	42.2	14.7	11.8	10.3	7.3	6.1	4.8	0.9	2.0	54.3	42.9	28,592
Total		80.1	100.0	5,303,212	39.9	15.3	13.4	9.2	8.4	6.2	4.7	1.4	1.7	52.9	44.0	471,790
Source: Sweden's Election Authority

=== By votes ===
Constituency	Land	Turnout	Share	Votes	S	M	FP	V	KD	C	MP	SD	Other	Left	Right	Margin
Constituency		%	%													
Blekinge	G	82.3	1.8	94,558	43,178	12,467	10,470	8,319	7,827	5,777	3,631	2,634	255	54,636	37,033	17,603
Dalarna	S	77.7	3.1	163,012	71,364	18,862	15,880	12,506	15,482	16,093	7,599	1,793	3,433	94,445	63,341	31,104
Gothenburg	G	77.5	5.1	273,056	90,547	47,586	49,187	23,519	32,405	5,115	17,657	4,311	2,729	140,609	125,407	15,202
Gotland	G	79.0	0.6	34,336	14,024	4,808	2,701	2,242	2,911	5,367	1,898	209	176	18,833	15,118	3,715
Gävleborg	N	77.6	3.1	164,934	74,155	15,480	16,548	12,230	18,412	17,187	7,451	1,704	1,767	100,018	61,445	38,573
Halland	G	81.5	3.2	168,247	60,295	29,264	23,415	16,720	9,995	15,908	6,578	1,759	4,313	76,868	85,307	8,439
Jämtland	N	77.8	1.4	76,865	34,256	7,592	5,569	3,874	8,469	11,705	3,967	219	1,214	46,692	28,740	17,952
Jönköping	G	82.1	3.8	198,982	78,670	25,267	17,978	40,316	11,417	14,510	6,400	1,994	2,430	96,487	98,071	1,584
Kalmar	G	80.7	2.7	144,228	63,089	18,331	12,865	16,112	10,519	15,360	5,210	1,157	1,585	78,818	62,668	16,150
Kronoberg	G	80.9	2.0	107,726	43,696	15,200	10,538	11,695	7,864	11,746	4,354	1,808	825	55,914	49,179	6,735
Malmö	G	76.0	2.8	147,134	62,338	24,235	20,322	7,793	11,172	1,701	6,310	5,538	7,725	79,820	54,051	25,769
Norrbotten	N	80.7	2.9	154,978	74,310	11,207	10,009	8,239	19,712	7,905	8,073	424	15,099	102,095	37,360	64,735
Skåne NE	G	77.6	3.2	169,421	66,488	29,907	19,776	18,664	9,498	11,960	5,978	4,715	2,435	81,964	80,307	1,657
Skåne S	G	82.5	3.7	198,228	75,459	39,652	31,270	13,234	10,876	8,270	8,078	7,268	4,121	94,413	92,426	1,987
Skåne W	G	77.3	2.8	150,449	60,464	26,420	20,551	12,154	8,295	6,908	5,015	6,711	3,931	73,774	66,033	7,741
Stockholm	S	80.7	8.6	458,005	143,640	96,205	89,510	30,228	49,795	8,109	31,027	4,706	4,785	224,462	224,052	410
Stockholm County	S	81.1	11.6	617,187	206,560	138,456	113,485	54,872	43,268	16,477	30,005	6,385	7,679	279,833	323,290	43,457
Södermanland	S	80.0	2.9	152,435	72,092	20,000	18,104	12,655	10,862	8,377	7,346	1,478	1,521	90,300	59,136	31,164
Uppsala	S	80.8	3.3	176,402	66,035	26,482	27,594	15,646	14,372	12,002	10,062	2,423	1,786	90,469	81,724	8,745
Värmland	S	79.8	3.1	165,413	71,715	20,499	18,963	13,406	14,361	15,161	6,608	2,268	2,432	92,684	68,029	24,655
Västerbotten	N	80.7	2.9	155,369	72,176	10,083	15,673	13,135	17,822	17,448	6,938	540	1,554	96,936	56,339	40,597
Västernorrland	N	79.5	2.8	150,966	74,486	12,842	13,974	11,450	14,902	14,566	5,672	1,269	1,805	95,060	52,832	42,228
Västmanland	S	78.4	2.8	149,321	67,153	18,488	19,855	11,957	13,010	8,538	6,504	1,690	2,126	86,667	58,838	27,829
Västra Götaland E	G	80.5	2.9	153,484	62,570	21,328	15,273	18,859	11,634	15,044	5,714	1,702	1,360	79,918	70,504	9,414
Västra Götaland N	G	80.8	2.9	155,668	64,050	18,860	19,200	18,203	13,298	11,915	6,687	2,169	1,286	84,035	68,178	15,857
Västra Götaland S	G	81.2	2.1	109,469	44,822	15,218	11,951	13,546	8,188	8,790	4,224	1,341	1,389	57,234	49,505	7,729
Västra Götaland W	G	81.2	3.7	195,816	72,450	29,467	31,260	22,831	15,389	10,556	8,409	3,069	2,385	96,248	94,114	2,134
Örebro	S	81.2	3.1	166,597	77,535	17,908	18,737	15,046	14,877	10,679	6,951	2,859	2,005	99,363	62,370	36,993
Östergötland	G	81.1	4.7	250,926	105,943	36,927	29,654	25,784	18,222	15,254	12,046	2,157	4,939	136,211	107,619	28,592
Total		80.1	100.0	5,303,212	2,113,560	809,041	710,312	485,235	444,854	328,428	246,392	76,300	89,090	2,804,806	2,333,016	471,790
Source: Sweden's Election Authority

== 1998–2002 bloc comparison ==
=== Percentage share ===
Constituency	Land	Votes 1998	Left 1998	Right 1998	Win 1998	Votes 2002	Left 2002	Right 2002	Win 2002	Change
Constituency			%	%	%		%	%	%	%
Blekinge	G	93,756	59.43	39.14	20.29	94,558	57.78	39.16	18,62	1.67
Dalarna	S	169,773	59.17	38.11	21.06	163,012	57.94	38.86	19.08	1.98
Gothenburg	G	263,181	49.99	46.16	3.83	273,056	51.49	45.93	5.56	1.73
Gotland	G	34,201	51.26	46.29	4.97	34,336	54.85	44.03	10.82	5.85
Gävleborg	N	170,128	64.20	34.15	30.05	164,934	60.64	37.25	23.39	6.66
Halland	G	164,049	44.32	50.22	5.90	168,247	45.69	50.70	5.01	0.89
Jämtland	N	81,025	62.14	36.28	25.86	76,865	60.75	37.39	23.36	2.50
Jönköping	G	199,750	46.83	51.09	4.26	198,982	48.49	49.10	0.61	3.65
Kalmar	G	145,502	54.77	43.70	11.07	144,228	54.65	43.45	11.20	0.13
Kronoberg	G	108,852	51.38	47.07	4.31	107,726	51.90	45.65	6.25	1.94
Malmö	G	140,635	54.07	39.94	14.13	147,134	54.25	36.74	17.51	3.38
Norrbotten	N	160,277	72.92	25.64	47.28	154,978	65.88	24.11	41.77	5.51
Skåne NE	G	170,449	48.15	48.96	0.81	169,421	48.38	47.40	0.98	1.79
Skåne S	G	192,722	46.33	49.75	3.42	198,228	47.63	46.63	1.00	4.42
Skåne W	G	149,286	48.77	45.08	3.69	150,449	49.04	43.89	5.15	1.46
Stockholm	S	438,295	45.70	51.84	6.14	458,005	49.01	48.92	0.09	6.23
Stockholm County	S	587,932	44.23	53.41	9.18	617,187	45.34	52.38	7.04	2.14
Södermanland	S	152,473	59.10	39.19	19.91	152,435	59.24	38.79	20.45	0.54
Uppsala	S	170,096	51.02	46.53	4.49	176,402	51.29	46.33	4.96	0.47
Värmland	S	169,723	59.20	39.48	19.72	165,413	56.03	41.13	14.90	4.82
Västerbotten	N	157,839	63.83	34.50	29.33	155,369	62.39	36.26	26.13	3.20
Västernorrland	N	157,892	63.95	34.11	29.84	150,966	62.97	35.00	27.97	1.87
Västmanland	S	150,609	58.72	39.84	18.88	149,321	58.04	39.40	18.64	0.24
Västra Götaland E	G	156,392	51.33	46.97	4.36	153,484	52.07	45.94	6.13	1.77
Västra Götaland N	G	157,292	53.93	43.86	10.07	155,668	53.98	43.80	10.18	0.11
Västra Götaland S	G	109,793	52.45	46.18	6.27	109,469	52.28	45.22	7.06	0.79
Västra Götaland W	G	192,059	49.70	46.78	2.92	195,816	49.15	48.06	1.09	1.83
Örebro	S	166,371	59.99	37.74	22.25	166,597	59.64	37.44	22.20	0.05
Östergötland	G	249,757	53.06	44.11	8.95	250,926	54.28	42.89	11.39	2.44
Total		5,260,109	52.89	44.50	8.39	5,303,212	52.89	43.99	8.90	0.51
Source: Sweden's Election Authority

=== By votes ===
Constituency	Land	Votes 1998	Left 1998	Right 1998	Win 1998	Votes 2002	Left 2002	Right 2002	Win 2002	Change
Constituency	#									
Blekinge	G	93,756	55,716	36,694	19,022	94,558	54,636	37,033	17,603	1,419
Dalarna	S	169,773	100,450	64,703	35,747	163,012	94,445	63,341	31,104	4,643
Gothenburg	G	263,181	131,561	121,481	10,080	273,056	140,609	125,407	15,202	5,122
Gotland	G	34,201	17,533	15,832	1,701	34,336	18,833	15,118	3,715	2,014
Gävleborg	N	170,128	109,229	58,101	51,128	164,934	100,018	61,445	38,573	12,555
Halland	G	164,049	72,706	82,384	9,678	168,247	76,868	85,307	8,439	1,239
Jämtland	N	81,025	50,346	29,396	20,950	76,865	46,692	28,740	17,952	2,998
Jönköping	G	199,750	93,551	102,056	8,505	198,982	96,487	98,071	1,584	6,921
Kalmar	G	145,502	79,686	63,584	16,102	144,228	78,818	62,668	16,150	48
Kronoberg	G	108,852	55,930	51,242	4,688	107,726	55,914	49,179	6,735	2,047
Malmö	G	140,635	76,039	56,168	19,871	147,134	79,820	54,051	25,769	5,898
Norrbotten	N	160,277	116,866	41,098	75,768	154,978	102,095	37,360	64,735	11,033
Skåne NE	G	170,449	82,071	83,455	1,384	169,421	81,964	80,307	1,657	3,041
Skåne S	G	192,722	89,281	95,885	6,604	198,228	94,413	92,426	1,987	8,591
Skåne W	G	149,286	72,805	67,303	5,502	150,449	73,774	66,033	7,741	2,239
Stockholm	S	438,295	200,295	227,219	26,924	458,005	224,462	224,052	410	27,334
Stockholm County	S	587,932	260,047	314,028	53,981	617,187	279,833	323,290	43,457	10,524
Södermanland	S	152,473	90,111	59,751	30,360	152,435	90,300	59,136	31,164	804
Uppsala	S	170,096	86,781	79,152	7,629	176,402	90,469	81,724	8,745	1,116
Värmland	S	169,723	100,478	67,008	33,470	165,413	92,684	68,029	24,655	8,815
Västerbotten	N	157,839	100,755	54,460	46,295	155,369	96,936	56,339	40,597	5,698
Västernorrland	N	157,892	100,976	53,857	47,119	150,966	95,060	52,832	42,228	4,891
Västmanland	S	150,609	88,440	59,996	28,444	149,321	86,667	58,838	27,829	615
Västra Götaland E	G	156,392	80,276	73,450	6,826	153,484	79,918	70,504	9,414	2,588
Västra Götaland N	G	157,292	84,833	68,989	15,844	155,668	84,035	68,178	15,857	13
Västra Götaland S	G	109,793	57,589	50,704	6,885	109,469	57,234	49,505	7,729	844
Västra Götaland W	G	192,059	95,460	89,853	5,607	195,816	96,248	94,114	2,134	3,473
Örebro	S	166,371	99,814	62,782	37,032	166,597	99,363	62,370	36,993	39
Östergötland	G	249,757	132,511	110,166	22,345	250,926	136,211	107,619	28,592	6,247
Total		5,260,109	2,782,136	2,340,797	441,339	5,303,212	2,804,806	2,333,016	471,790	30,451
Source: Sweden's Election Authority

== Municipal summary ==
Location	County	Turnout	Votes	S	M	FP	KD	V	C	MP	SD	Other	Left	Right
Ale	Västra Götaland	80.9	14,658	43.9	11.1	12.1	10.2	10.3	5.4	4.1	2.1	0.9	58.3	38.8
Alingsås	Västra Götaland	83.0	21,670	34.4	13.1	15.3	15.8	9.2	5.5	5.6	0.5	0.6	49.2	49.8
Alvesta	Kronoberg	81.0	11,374	40.2	13.0	8.8	11.2	7.2	13.6	3.3	2.2	0.7	50.6	46.5
Aneby	Jönköping	83.8	4,074	34.4	9.2	7.4	28.3	4.3	11.6	2.9	0.6	1.4	41.6	56.4
Arboga	Västmanland	79.8	8,169	44.3	11.7	12.3	8.4	8.9	6.9	5.3	1.0	1.3	58.4	39.2
Arjeplog	Norrbotten	77.0	1,981	45.8	3.9	5.5	5.7	14.8	9.3	4.5	0.0	10.6	65.2	24.3
Arvidsjaur	Norrbotten	79.2	4,425	53.9	5.1	5.4	4.3	14.5	7.5	1.9	0.0	7.4	70.3	22.3
Arvika	Värmland	76.4	15,086	44.0	10.3	10.7	7.9	9.4	9.0	5.6	1.7	1.4	59.0	37.9
Askersund	Västra Götaland	81.0	7,186	45.5	11.1	8.8	9.4	8.6	10.6	3.2	2.1	0.8	57.3	39.8
Avesta	Dalarna	77.4	13,254	50.0	9.6	8.8	7.0	9.7	9.5	3.5	0.8	1.1	63.3	34.8
Bengtsfors	Västra Götaland	77.4	6,197	46.2	8.9	9.0	10.5	6.9	14.1	3.0	0.2	1.1	56.1	42.5
Berg	Jämtland	77.2	4,729	39.0	8.6	5.4	6.8	10.0	22.1	5.3	0.3	2.5	54.4	42.9
Bjurholm	Västerbotten	78.6	1,613	39.0	14.1	10.5	10.2	4.0	20.0	0.9	0.2	1.0	43.9	54.9
Bjuv	Skåne	74.4	7,254	53.3	12.9	8.6	7.3	5.9	3.7	2.2	5.0	1.2	61.3	32.5
Boden	Norrbotten	82.2	17,850	47.3	10.0	6.8	5.2	11.6	3.9	5.0	0.2	9.9	63.9	25.9
Bollebygd	Västra Götaland	84.4	4,785	37.3	16.6	10.9	13.9	7.0	7.8	4.5	1.5	0.5	48.8	49.2
Bollnäs	Gävleborg	79.7	16,359	37.2	9.6	11.4	7.5	9.1	18.1	4.8	0.8	1.3	51.1	46.7
Borgholm	Kalmar	79.9	7,058	28.6	16.0	8.7	14.5	5.7	21.3	4.0	0.5	0.8	38.3	60.4
Borlänge	Dalarna	78.2	27,313	48.6	10.4	9.5	6.2	10.0	6.2	5.2	1.8	2.2	63.7	32.3
Borås	Västra Götaland	80.8	58,125	42.2	15.2	11.6	11.7	8.2	4.3	3.8	1.5	1.6	54.2	42.8
Botkyrka	Stockholm	74.1	34,748	43.1	13.8	14.3	9.6	10.3	1.6	4.7	1.2	1.4	58.1	39.3
Boxholm	Östergötland	83.0	3,300	53.4	7.4	5.9	9.8	7.5	11.4	3.2	0.6	0.8	64.2	34.5
Bromölla	Skåne	78.0	7,080	56.4	9.3	7.7	7.0	8.7	3.8	2.9	3.4	0.7	68.1	27.9
Bräcke	Jämtland	75.0	4,283	52.2	8.3	5.5	2.6	11.4	14.9	3.3	0.1	1.6	66.9	31.3
Burlöv	Skåne	79.8	8,682	48.2	14.2	11.9	5.2	6.3	2.3	2.7	6.5	2.6	57.3	33.7
Båstad	Skåne	79.8	8,799	21.4	27.1	15.4	14.9	3.1	11.3	3.6	2.5	0.6	28.0	68.8
Dals-Ed	Västra Götaland	74.5	2,700	37.9	10.8	6.4	17.2	4.3	17.9	3.7	0.3	1.6	45.8	52.3
Danderyd	Stockholm	87.6	19,171	11.2	45.1	24.7	10.7	2.1	1.9	3.2	0.5	0.7	16.4	82.3
Degerfors	Örebro	82.3	6,491	60.8	5.1	6.0	5.2	13.3	5.3	2.5	0.9	0.7	76.7	21.7
Dorotea	Västerbotten	77.4	1,940	55.1	3.8	9.2	4.6	11.0	12.6	1.8	0.3	1.7	67.8	30.2
Eda	Värmland	74.9	4,322	49.8	8.8	8.2	8.1	7.0	13.3	2.6	0.9	1.0	59.5	38.5
Ekerö	Stockholm	86.2	13,635	25.8	26.1	20.4	10.5	5.2	3.8	6.4	0.8	1.0	37.4	60.8
Eksjö	Jönköping	82.1	10,516	37.1	13.2	9.0	19.4	4.9	11.3	3.6	0.8	0.8	45.5	52.9
Emmaboda	Kalmar	81.7	5,972	50.4	9.8	5.5	9.9	5.8	13.3	3.3	0.8	1.3	59.5	38.5
Enköping	Uppsala	79.2	21,716	40.0	16.3	10.8	9.6	5.4	11.4	3.5	0.8	2.1	48.9	48.2
Eskilstuna	Södermanland	77.5	50,404	47.8	12.2	12.6	7.6	7.8	4.4	5.0	1.3	1.3	60.5	36.8
Eslöv	Skåne	77.6	16,158	45.6	14.1	10.8	5.9	5.2	9.4	3.2	4.5	1.3	53.9	40.2
Essunga	Västra Götaland	81.9	3,530	33.0	17.8	8.7	12.3	5.7	18.7	2.7	0.3	0.9	41.3	57.5
Fagersta	Västmanland	77.8	7,301	52.6	10.2	8.0	6.0	13.7	3.9	3.6	1.0	1.0	69.8	28.1
Falkenberg	Halland	81.2	23,397	36.8	14.3	11.3	9.0	5.5	15.0	3.8	1.2	3.0	46.1	49.7
Falköping	Västra Götaland	80.7	18,731	37.4	14.3	8.5	14.8	6.9	12.0	4.0	1.5	0.6	48.3	49.6
Falun	Dalarna	79.2	32,593	38.4	15.3	12.5	7.5	8.6	8.4	5.6	1.1	2.7	52.6	43.7
Filipstad	Värmland	76.0	6,632	53.8	8.2	7.3	5.8	12.3	5.6	3.3	1.4	2.2	69.4	26.9
Finspång	Östergötland	83.0	13,253	51.6	9.7	8.3	9.6	9.5	5.7	4.0	0.6	0.9	65.2	33.3
Flen	Södermanland	80.3	9,724	48.1	12.1	9.3	8.7	7.5	7.5	4.5	1.0	1.2	60.2	37.6
Forshaga	Värmland	80.9	6,775	51.9	9.2	8.7	7.2	8.1	7.5	3.9	2.2	1.3	63.9	32.7
Färgelanda	Västra Götaland	79.0	4,072	39.8	9.2	10.8	10.0	6.1	19.5	2.0	1.6	0.9	47.9	49.6
Gagnef	Dalarna	79.4	5,802	40.4	9.9	8.9	10.6	7.3	15.1	4.5	0.8	2.5	52.2	44.5
Gislaved	Jönköping	79.8	16,781	41.4	14.1	8.9	14.7	4.7	10.6	2.7	1.5	1.3	48.9	48.3
Gnesta	Södermanland	80.3	5,769	40.3	14.5	11.4	8.5	6.6	10.4	6.5	0.6	1.2	53.4	44.8
Gnosjö	Jönköping	80.6	5,577	34.4	12.9	7.5	30.6	3.6	6.6	1.9	1.5	0.9	39.9	57.6
Gothenburg	Västra Götaland	77.5	273,056	33.2	17.4	18.0	8.6	11.9	1.9	6.5	1.6	1.0	51.5	45.9
Gotland	Gotland	79.0	34,336	40.8	14.0	7.9	6.5	8.5	15.6	5.5	0.6	0.5	54.8	44.0
Grums	Värmland	78.0	5,497	54.7	8.8	5.8	7.5	8.8	9.6	2.1	0.9	1.8	65.6	31.7
Grästorp	Västra Götaland	80.5	3,552	33.2	18.3	9.4	12.3	5.2	17.0	2.9	1.2	0.4	41.4	57.0
Gullspång	Västra Götaland	79.8	3,457	42.9	11.6	6.8	10.9	8.1	10.7	3.9	2.7	2.3	54.9	40.1
Gällivare	Norrbotten	75.5	11,484	41.9	7.0	4.0	3.4	16.6	1.9	4.9	0.8	19.6	63.4	16.3
Gävle	Gävleborg	78.8	54,396	46.5	11.8	12.9	7.4	10.0	4.4	5.0	1.5	0.6	61.4	36.5
Götene	Västra Götaland	82.5	7,937	40.5	11.6	9.1	14.0	8.0	10.9	3.9	1.0	1.0	52.4	45.6
Habo	Jönköping	84.3	5,670	36.0	14.9	9.4	23.7	5.1	6.1	2.9	0.4	1.6	44.0	54.1
Hagfors	Värmland	79.6	8,615	56.9	6.3	5.0	4.9	13.7	9.4	2.0	1.2	0.6	72.7	25.5
Hallsberg	Örebro	82.3	9,635	50.8	8.4	8.6	8.7	8.3	8.4	3.4	2.3	0.9	62.6	34.2
Hallstahammar	Västmanland	77.1	8,345	52.3	8.3	9.8	8.3	10.6	4.3	3.3	1.9	1.1	66.2	30.8
Halmstad	Halland	80.2	52,342	40.9	16.4	13.9	8.5	6.9	5.8	4.2	0.7	2.9	52.0	44.5
Hammarö	Värmland	83.9	8,671	46.5	14.2	13.3	7.6	8.2	4.0	3.6	1.3	1.3	58.3	39.1
Haninge	Stockholm	78.5	38,010	42.0	16.1	14.7	8.1	9.0	2.0	5.0	0.9	2.3	56.0	40.9
Haparanda	Norrbotten	67.2	4,079	44.8	11.5	3.9	5.5	9.8	10.8	4.2	0.2	9.2	58.8	31.7
Heby	Västmanland	78.7	7,833	40.5	9.6	8.4	10.5	8.4	16.9	3.5	1.4	0.8	52.4	45.4
Hedemora	Dalarna	75.8	8,916	42.9	10.6	7.6	7.9	10.4	12.9	5.1	0.6	2.0	58.4	39.0
Helsingborg	Skåne	76.5	68,381	39.0	18.8	15.1	8.4	5.9	2.1	3.6	4.0	3.0	48.5	44.4
Herrljunga	Västra Götaland	82.7	5,781	32.7	12.1	9.8	17.1	6.6	16.0	3.5	1.2	1.0	42.8	55.0
Hjo	Västra Götaland	81.0	5,444	37.7	15.0	11.3	15.1	6.9	8.4	3.7	0.9	0.9	48.3	49.8
Hofors	Gävleborg	76.6	5,992	56.4	6.5	7.7	4.3	15.4	5.1	3.3	1.2	0.2	75.1	23.5
Huddinge	Stockholm	79.8	45,707	37.3	19.5	17.0	8.1	8.3	1.9	4.7	1.7	1.5	50.2	46.6
Hudiksvall	Gävleborg	75.4	21,364	42.6	8.1	7.8	7.1	11.8	15.0	5.6	0.6	1.4	60.0	37.9
Hultsfred	Kalmar	79.6	8,893	46.2	9.1	5.4	12.3	8.2	14.1	2.3	1.8	0.5	56.7	40.9
Hylte	Halland	79.7	5,983	42.3	11.5	9.0	8.7	4.6	17.3	2.9	1.1	2.7	49.8	46.5
Håbo	Uppsala	80.9	9,802	36.6	23.3	13.9	10.9	5.0	4.0	3.8	1.0	1.4	45.4	52.2
Hällefors	Örebro	75.7	4,478	62.6	6.9	6.2	4.3	9.8	6.2	3.0	0.7	0.3	75.4	23.6
Härjedalen	Jämtland	74.9	6,650	50.2	9.8	6.1	4.7	12.2	11.6	3.7	0.3	1.5	66.1	32.1
Härnösand	Västernorrland	78.4	15,349	45.6	10.0	10.1	7.4	9.6	10.5	5.7	0.4	0.7	60.9	38.0
Härryda	Västra Götaland	83.0	17,697	34.2	17.2	18.9	9.6	7.7	3.9	5.1	1.5	1.7	47.1	49.7
Hässleholm	Skåne	77.8	28,345	38.5	15.1	10.5	13.0	5.6	8.8	4.1	3.5	0.9	48.1	47.5
Höganäs	Skåne	82.4	14,277	32.7	22.8	16.2	11.5	4.7	4.0	3.6	2.7	1.8	41.0	54.5
Högsby	Kalmar	81.6	3,854	46.1	9.6	5.3	14.3	8.2	12.8	2.3	0.8	0.5	56.7	42.0
Hörby	Skåne	82.4	7,805	33.6	14.6	11.5	10.1	14.3	3.6	3.5	5.6	3.2	40.7	50.5
Höör	Skåne	77.6	7,952	35.4	17.0	13.1	9.1	4.9	7.7	4.7	4.4	3.6	45.1	46.8
Jokkmokk	Norrbotten	78.8	3,544	45.3	4.1	5.4	3.7	13.5	3.2	8.7	0.0	15.9	67.5	16.5
Järfälla	Stockholm	83.0	36,349	37.2	18.6	18.3	9.3	7.8	2.0	4.7	1.3	0.9	49.6	48.2
Jönköping	Jönköping	82.6	72,976	39.7	13.2	10.7	19.9	6.5	4.1	3.6	1.0	1.3	49.8	47.9
Kalix	Norrbotten	82.3	11,126	53.4	6.4	4.9	4.0	10.1	6.2	8.8	0.2	6.0	72.3	21.5
Kalmar	Kalmar	82.3	37,529	42.9	15.4	11.4	9.9	7.1	6.1	4.7	0.7	1.8	54.7	42.8
Karlsborg	Västra Götaland	81.9	4,440	43.5	13.6	9.5	12.4	6.2	10.2	3.2	0.5	0.9	52.9	45.7
Karlshamn	Blekinge	81.3	19,346	47.4	11.6	10.3	7.5	10.3	5.4	4.6	2.7	0.2	62.3	34.8
Karlskoga	Örebro	79.6	18,738	54.6	11.3	9.6	6.6	8.9	2.8	2.9	1.2	2.0	66.4	30.4
Karlskrona	Blekinge	84.5	39,277	43.7	13.8	12.1	9.9	7.2	6.1	4.0	2.6	0.3	54.9	42.2
Karlstad	Värmland	82.1	51,272	40.0	15.2	14.2	8.7	8.0	5.7	4.9	1.4	2.0	52.8	43.8
Katrineholm	Södermanland	81.2	19,543	52.7	10.9	9.8	7.8	5.6	6.0	5.0	1.2	1.0	63.3	34.5
Kil	Värmland	80.5	7,001	41.8	13.6	11.4	9.8	7.1	10.0	3.8	1.6	0.9	52.7	44.9
Kinda	Östergötland	81.0	6,105	38.5	11.1	8.1	14.4	5.8	16.3	4.2	1.0	0.5	48.5	50.0
Kiruna	Norrbotten	77.6	13,709	40.9	4.5	4.2	3.9	14.8	1.9	5.3	0.5	24.0	61.0	14.4
Klippan	Skåne	73.7	8,496	40.5	18.9	9.3	11.8	4.5	7.3	2.7	2.7	2.2	47.8	47.4
Knivsta	Uppsala	82.9	7,162	31.8	20.1	17.9	10.5	5.5	6.8	5.0	1.6	0.8	42.3	55.2
Kramfors	Västernorrland	79.4	13,017	51.0	6.8	5.4	5.8	12.6	13.9	3.7	0.4	0.5	67.3	31.9
Kristianstad	Skåne	79.0	44,401	41.6	16.7	14.0	9.1	5.9	4.9	3.8	2.3	1.6	51.3	44.8
Kristinehamn	Värmland	81.3	14,888	42.1	12.0	12.3	8.3	9.5	8.6	4.3	1.4	1.5	55.9	41.2
Krokom	Jämtland	78.7	8,160	41.8	9.1	5.4	5.2	9.6	20.6	6.4	0.3	1.6	57.8	40.3
Kumla	Örebro	82.4	11,573	48.5	10.2	9.3	10.4	7.9	7.2	3.1	2.2	1.1	59.5	37.2
Kungsbacka	Halland	84.3	40,439	26.2	24.5	19.8	12.1	4.7	5.9	3.8	1.2	1.9	34.7	62.3
Kungsör	Västmanland	80.2	4,820	45.3	12.2	11.7	8.5	8.3	8.9	3.6	0.5	1.1	57.2	41.2
Kungälv	Västra Götaland	84.1	23,337	38.4	15.1	14.9	12.1	7.5	6.0	4.0	1.2	0.7	50.0	48.1
Kävlinge	Skåne	83.3	15,224	43.0	18.1	13.8	6.4	4.1	4.3	2.6	6.0	1.6	49.8	42.6
Köping	Västmanland	77.3	14,046	48.8	11.0	10.3	6.8	9.9	7.0	3.3	0.9	2.1	62.0	35.1
Laholm	Halland	79.1	13,404	33.0	16.6	10.2	11.5	4.8	16.4	3.6	1.2	2.7	41.4	54.7
Landskrona	Skåne	77.1	21,382	44.4	16.4	13.6	5.7	6.3	2.2	2.5	6.2	2.7	53.2	37.9
Laxå	Örebro	80.7	3,944	50.7	6.8	8.9	10.0	9.7	7.3	2.4	2.4	1.7	62.9	33.0
Lekeberg	Örebro	81.8	4,347	36.6	11.2	8.9	11.8	6.5	18.1	3.7	2.4	0.8	46.8	50.0
Leksand	Dalarna	80.5	9,428	34.9	12.5	10.2	13.1	7.7	14.1	4.8	0.8	1.9	47.4	49.9
Lerum	Västra Götaland	84.8	21,184	32.9	17.3	18.1	12.1	8.5	3.4	5.0	1.7	0.9	46.4	50.9
Lessebo	Kronoberg	82.5	5,024	53.2	10.1	7.5	6.5	9.4	8.1	3.6	1.2	0.4	66.2	32.1
Lidingö	Stockholm	85.9	26,279	17.0	36.4	26.5	9.3	3.5	1.8	4.1	0.8	0.5	24.6	74.0
Lidköping	Västra Götaland	81.7	22,854	43.4	12.0	10.1	11.3	9.4	8.0	3.7	0.7	1.4	56.6	41.4
Lilla Edet	Västra Götaland	77.7	7,141	45.6	10.2	9.7	8.0	9.8	8.5	4.7	2.7	0.8	60.1	36.5
Lindesberg	Örebro	79.3	13,989	47.5	10.1	8.4	7.6	7.7	12.0	4.0	1.6	1.0	59.3	38.1
Linköping	Östergötland	82.9	84,043	38.2	16.0	15.1	10.7	7.0	5.1	5.4	0.7	1.9	50.6	46.8
Ljungby	Kronoberg	80.0	16,160	39.5	12.2	8.5	12.9	6.5	14.4	3.9	1.2	0.9	50.0	47.9
Ljusdal	Gävleborg	71.9	11,069	41.8	8.2	9.0	7.4	12.9	14.6	4.4	0.9	0.8	59.2	39.1
Ljusnarsberg	Örebro	74.4	3,172	51.8	7.2	6.0	6.2	12.3	10.8	3.4	1.7	0.7	67.5	30.1
Lomma	Skåne	88.1	11,883	32.0	26.7	19.9	7.7	2.6	2.5	3.1	3.4	2.1	37.7	56.9
Ludvika	Dalarna	77.5	15,521	53.9	8.9	7.7	5.9	13.2	4.6	3.9	1.1	0.9	71.0	27.1
Luleå	Norrbotten	82.3	44,770	47.0	9.9	9.8	5.8	11.6	4.8	6.2	0.2	4.6	64.8	30.3
Lund	Skåne	84.2	63,077	34.2	16.9	20.6	5.7	9.1	3.3	7.2	1.7	1.2	50.6	46.5
Lycksele	Västerbotten	78.5	7,694	50.6	5.5	10.9	10.9	9.9	8.4	2.1	0.4	1.4	62.5	35.7
Lysekil	Västra Götaland	80.9	9,133	48.9	11.4	15.4	7.0	7.6	3.7	4.4	1.2	0.4	60.9	37.5
Malmö	Skåne	76.0	147,134	42.4	16.5	13.8	5.3	7.6	1.2	4.3	3.8	5.3	54.2	36.7
Malung	Dalarna	79.2	6,484	42.7	14.5	10.0	6.6	9.5	11.3	2.6	0.6	2.2	54.9	42.4
Malå	Västerbotten	79.3	2,199	48.8	6.1	8.5	7.2	17.3	9.0	2.0	0.1	0.9	68.2	30.9
Mariestad	Västra Götaland	79.2	14,179	43.6	13.1	10.1	11.3	8.8	6.2	4.4	1.7	0.7	56.8	40.8
Mark	Västra Götaland	81.3	19,559	42.8	11.1	9.5	12.1	8.1	10.5	4.1	1.0	0.9	55.0	43.1
Markaryd	Kronoberg	77.4	5,595	44.2	11.8	6.6	16.1	5.0	10.0	2.6	3.0	0.8	51.8	44.5
Mellerud	Västra Götaland	77.8	5,656	35.7	12.7	9.6	13.4	6.3	15.3	3.1	1.9	2.0	45.1	51.0
Mjölby	Östergötland	80.9	15,351	46.4	12.7	9.9	10.1	7.2	8.0	3.4	0.3	2.1	57.0	40.6
Mora	Dalarna	76.1	11,660	39.0	12.2	11.0	8.6	8.2	12.2	5.2	1.0	2.8	52.4	43.9
Motala	Östergötland	79.9	24,994	49.4	10.8	10.2	9.0	7.6	5.1	4.1	0.4	3.4	61.0	35.1
Mullsjö	Jönköping	82.9	4,256	35.3	12.0	8.0	25.6	7.0	5.3	4.3	0.8	1.6	46.6	51.0
Munkedal	Västra Götaland	76.8	6,000	40.4	10.7	9.0	12.1	7.0	14.1	3.3	2.2	1.3	50.6	45.9
Munkfors	Värmland	80.4	2,576	59.3	6.1	7.0	4.1	9.6	8.6	3.0	1.8	0.5	71.9	25.8
Mölndal	Västra Götaland	82.5	34,161	35.1	15.9	19.0	9.7	8.9	3.0	4.3	2.0	2.1	48.3	47.6
Mönsterås	Kalmar	81.4	8,079	47.8	10.4	7.0	10.2	7.9	11.5	2.9	0.9	1.4	58.7	39.1
Mörbylånga	Kalmar	83.0	8,410	37.7	15.3	10.5	12.0	6.4	13.2	3.9	0.4	0.7	47.9	51.0
Nacka	Stockholm	83.2	44,243	26.9	27.4	22.0	7.9	6.9	1.7	5.4	0.9	0.9	39.2	59.0
Nora	Örebro	79.2	6,273	45.3	11.0	11.4	8.9	9.1	7.8	4.1	1.4	1.0	58.5	39.1
Norberg	Västmanland	78.8	3,489	49.6	8.9	8.1	5.0	17.2	5.4	4.2	0.4	1.2	71.0	27.4
Nordanstig	Gävleborg	74.3	5,717	39.4	7.0	7.9	8.6	9.2	20.0	4.5	0.7	2.7	53.1	43.5
Nordmaling	Västerbotten	78.6	4,535	48.3	7.5	9.0	10.1	7.5	14.5	2.3	0.2	0.7	58.1	41.1
Norrköping	Östergötland	78.9	72,054	42.3	16.7	11.6	9.1	7.8	3.8	5.1	1.4	2.2	55.2	41.2
Norrtälje	Stockholm	78.6	31,287	39.3	17.3	13.1	8.3	6.2	8.6	4.6	0.5	2.0	50.1	47.3
Norsjö	Västerbotten	79.7	2,850	44.1	4.1	6.7	9.0	13.7	19.6	1.7	0.1	1.0	59.5	39.4
Nybro	Kalmar	80.6	12,136	46.8	10.8	7.0	11.0	7.6	11.6	2.3	0.5	2.6	56.6	40.2
Nykvarn	Stockholm	83.0	4,570	42.9	17.6	14.0	8.2	5.2	4.8	4.2	1.9	1.2	52.3	44.6
Nyköping	Södermanland	82.7	30,854	47.4	13.0	11.3	9.3	7.4	6.0	4.3	0.8	0.6	59.1	39.6
Nynäshamn	Stockholm	79.9	14,196	42.8	15.8	13.2	8.7	8.8	3.6	4.9	1.8	0.5	56.5	41.2
Nässjö	Jönköping	82.9	18,219	43.5	11.5	7.1	17.7	7.3	7.4	3.3	0.9	1.2	54.1	43.8
Ockelbo	Gävleborg	76.1	3,586	46.9	6.7	6.6	5.9	13.4	15.4	2.8	0.8	1.4	63.1	34.7
Olofström	Blekinge	79.2	7,946	51.9	8.2	9.4	9.0	8.7	6.3	2.8	3.2	0.4	63.4	33.0
Orsa	Dalarna	76.3	4,015	36.9	10.3	9.1	8.2	10.2	13.6	6.0	2.8	2.9	53.1	41.3
Orust	Västra Götaland	80.0	9,068	35.6	14.6	14.6	11.3	8.1	9.3	4.6	1.3	0.5	48.3	49.9
Osby	Skåne	78.0	7,490	46.0	10.9	8.3	11.4	7.2	9.1	3.2	3.0	0.8	56.4	39.7
Oskarshamn	Kalmar	80.7	16,160	47.7	12.5	8.3	13.7	8.1	5.2	3.0	1.0	0.5	58.8	39.7
Ovanåker	Gävleborg	80.6	7,670	35.7	7.4	8.0	13.8	6.8	23.2	3.7	0.3	1.0	46.3	52.4
Oxelösund	Södermanland	80.9	6,791	56.2	9.8	8.8	5.9	11.7	1.9	4.7	0.5	0.5	72.6	25.4
Pajala	Norrbotten	78.2	4,392	35.5	5.0	2.2	7.9	19.5	4.2	2.5	0.0	23.1	57.6	19.4
Partille	Västra Götaland	82.9	19,385	34.6	16.4	19.3	11.3	9.0	1.9	4.5	1.4	1.6	48.1	48.8
Perstorp	Skåne	75.0	3,705	42.9	15.8	10.8	9.3	7.7	7.2	2.2	1.7	2.5	52.7	43.0
Piteå	Norrbotten	84.9	26,455	55.5	4.7	6.2	6.4	11.9	6.1	4.0	0.4	4.9	71.4	23.4
Ragunda	Jämtland	74.6	3,526	49.4	7.7	4.0	3.2	12.0	18.0	3.2	0.2	2.4	64.5	32.9
Robertsfors	Västerbotten	80.5	4,336	38.8	5.7	5.4	8.9	8.0	30.4	2.1	0.2	0.5	49.0	50.3
Ronneby	Blekinge	81.6	17,974	45.6	12.7	10.6	7.8	9.0	7.3	3.8	3.0	0.2	58.3	38.5
Rättvik	Dalarna	76.4	6,497	38.9	12.8	11.3	8.1	6.7	14.6	4.5	0.8	2.2	50.2	46.8
Sala	Västmanland	78.3	12,600	40.8	11.8	11.3	9.6	7.4	12.8	4.3	1.2	0.8	52.4	45.5
Salem	Stockholm	83.7	7,778	36.2	19.8	18.5	9.5	6.0	2.2	5.0	1.6	1.1	47.2	50.1
Sandviken	Gävleborg	79.1	22,454	51.8	9.1	8.5	6.5	11.8	6.5	3.7	1.1	1.1	67.2	30.6
Sigtuna	Stockholm	77.3	18,967	38.1	20.1	15.4	9.3	6.8	3.7	4.2	1.7	0.6	49.2	48.5
Simrishamn	Skåne	76.6	11,542	35.7	19.8	11.9	9.1	6.7	9.0	3.9	2.5	1.4	46.3	49.8
Sjöbo	Skåne	75.8	9,561	36.7	18.4	9.1	9.3	4.8	10.8	2.8	5.0	3.2	44.2	47.5
Skara	Västra Götaland	80.1	11,015	42.2	14.8	10.3	10.5	7.8	9.0	4.0	0.8	0.5	54.0	44.7
Skinnskatteberg	Västmanland	77.5	2,704	53.6	7.8	6.8	5.3	12.9	8.3	3.9	0.6	0.9	70.4	28.2
Skellefteå	Västerbotten	81.4	44,967	50.7	5.0	9.5	8.5	11.5	10.2	3.6	0.4	0.7	65.7	33.2
Skurup	Skåne	77.9	7,961	39.9	17.6	11.2	7.1	4.8	9.5	2.6	5.7	1.6	47.4	45.4
Skövde	Västra Götaland	80.6	29,477	40.9	14.6	12.2	11.7	7.1	7.5	3.9	1.0	1.0	51.9	46.0
Smedjebacken	Dalarna	77.8	6,693	55.1	9.4	6.9	5.1	11.5	6.6	3.7	0.5	1.1	70.3	28.0
Sollefteå	Västernorrland	78.9	13,126	53.4	6.8	5.7	7.4	11.5	9.9	4.1	0.7	0.6	68.9	29.8
Sollentuna	Stockholm	84.6	34,550	29.2	24.5	21.5	9.9	5.9	2.5	4.7	1.0	0.6	39.8	58.5
Solna	Stockholm	80.2	35,575	33.3	21.8	19.4	6.9	9.3	1.8	5.5	0.9	1.1	48.1	49.8
Sorsele	Västerbotten	75.0	1,794	44.1	5.6	6.4	11.7	9.4	15.3	4.7	0.5	2.3	58.2	39.0
Sotenäs	Västra Götaland	79.2	5,877	39.2	19.1	15.0	10.7	5.9	4.6	3.4	1.0	1.2	48.4	49.5
Staffanstorp	Skåne	85.0	12,191	41.7	20.7	14.7	7.0	3.3	3.9	2.4	3.6	2.7	47.3	46.4
Stenungsund	Västra Götaland	81.1	12,601	37.3	16.0	16.5	11.3	6.8	5.1	4.2	1.3	1.6	48.3	48.9
Stockholm	Stockholm	80.7	458,005	31.4	21.0	19.5	6.6	10.9	1.8	6.8	1.0	1.0	49.0	48.9
Storfors	Värmland	79.6	2,752	52.6	9.3	7.7	7.3	10.4	7.3	3.1	1.2	1.2	66.1	31.5
Storuman	Västerbotten	76.3	4,025	42.3	8.2	8.0	11.4	10.0	13.7	3.6	0.3	2.4	55.9	41.4
Strängnäs	Södermanland	80.1	17,534	38.5	18.4	16.3	9.5	5.9	5.4	4.5	0.5	1.1	48.9	49.6
Strömstad	Västra Götaland	72.0	5,686	38.5	13.9	12.8	7.6	6.8	13.8	5.3	0.6	0.7	50.6	48.2
Strömsund	Jämtland	78.4	8,256	50.8	6.5	4.7	4.3	13.3	15.3	3.1	0.3	1.7	67.2	30.8
Sundbyberg	Stockholm	78.5	20,069	37.3	19.2	17.2	6.4	9.7	2.0	5.6	1.5	1.1	52.7	44.7
Sundsvall	Västernorrland	79.5	57,374	46.4	10.9	12.1	6.9	10.0	6.9	4.2	1.4	1.3	60.6	36.7
Surahammar	Västmanland	77.8	5,604	57.8	7.2	8.7	5.6	11.5	3.8	3.5	0.9	0.9	72.9	25.3
Sunne	Värmland	79.1	8,189	35.1	14.6	9.4	8.9	5.9	20.3	3.8	1.6	0.5	44.8	53.1
Svalöv	Skåne	79.9	7,240	41.0	15.2	9.6	7.3	4.1	12.7	2.8	4.9	2.3	48.0	44.8
Svedala	Skåne	83.6	10,943	44.5	16.6	13.5	6.9	3.8	4.0	2.5	6.3	1.9	50.9	40.9
Svenljunga	Västra Götaland	78.6	6,045	38.2	13.7	10.4	12.7	4.8	15.2	3.3	0.9	0.8	46.4	51.9
Säffle	Värmland	80.8	10,054	33.8	12.4	10.8	10.9	6.6	19.1	3.6	1.0	1.9	44.0	53.1
Säter	Dalarna	78.0	6,445	39.3	11.7	8.3	8.5	9.8	15.6	4.0	0.9	1.9	53.1	44.1
Sävsjö	Jönköping	81.7	6,671	32.6	12.9	6.0	25.6	4.5	13.6	2.2	1.4	1.3	39.3	58.1
Söderhamn	Gävleborg	77.8	16,327	45.1	7.6	8.2	7.0	15.0	10.9	3.7	0.8	1.7	63.8	33.7
Söderköping	Östergötland	82.2	8,514	35.3	19.0	10.3	11.5	5.8	10.4	5.4	1.3	1.1	46.5	51.2
Södertälje	Stockholm	76.2	40,914	42.3	14.5	12.9	9.7	7.5	3.4	6.0	0.7	3.1	55.8	40.4
Sölvesborg	Blekinge	80.2	10,015	45.1	18.6	9.4	8.7	7.1	5.1	3.0	2.7	0.4	55.1	41.8
Tanum	Västra Götaland	76.8	6,980	29.3	14.5	14.2	10.5	5.9	18.6	5.0	0.6	1.5	40.1	57.9
Tibro	Västra Götaland	80.1	6,338	42.5	11.9	10.7	14.3	7.2	8.1	3.5	0.8	1.0	53.2	45.0
Tidaholm	Västra Götaland	81.9	7,716	49.2	10.0	8.4	11.4	8.4	8.3	3.2	0.8	0.4	60.8	38.1
Tierp	Uppsala	78.9	11,947	50.7	8.2	8.1	7.7	7.3	12.5	3.7	1.5	0.4	61.8	36.4
Timrå	Västernorrland	79.5	10,754	55.0	5.4	8.0	5.9	12.5	8.3	2.3	1.5	1.2	69.8	27.5
Tingsryd	Kronoberg	78.2	7,861	36.5	14.9	6.2	11.9	6.0	17.7	3.3	2.2	1.2	45.8	50.8
Tjörn	Västra Götaland	83.0	9,183	28.7	16.1	17.6	22.0	5.4	3.8	3.7	1.9	0.8	37.9	59.5
Tomelilla	Skåne	73.7	6,930	37.5	18.4	9.7	8.1	5.3	12.0	3.2	5.0	0.9	45.9	48.2
Torsby	Värmland	76.7	7,975	43.6	15.7	5.9	5.4	11.6	12.7	2.9	1.2	1.0	58.1	39.7
Torsås	Kalmar	79.4	4,474	39.1	13.1	6.5	12.9	4.5	19.2	3.5	0.6	0.6	47.0	51.8
Tranemo	Västra Götaland	83.0	7,200	42.1	12.3	8.9	11.8	5.0	15.4	3.3	0.9	0.3	50.4	48.4
Tranås	Jönköping	81.5	11,035	43.8	13.0	8.5	17.8	6.2	5.6	3.5	0.4	1.3	53.4	44.8
Trelleborg	Skåne	78.6	22,565	48.1	15.0	9.8	7.1	4.1	4.1	2.8	4.9	4.0	55.1	36.0
Trollhättan	Västra Götaland	80.1	30,791	49.9	11.5	11.3	7.7	8.8	4.5	3.9	2.1	0.3	62.7	34.9
Trosa	Södermanland	83.2	6,218	41.0	19.0	13.4	9.3	5.5	5.1	5.3	0.6	0.7	51.8	46.9
Tyresö	Stockholm	83.2	22,313	35.2	21.8	18.4	7.8	7.2	2.0	4.9	1.0	1.6	47.4	50.0
Täby	Stockholm	86.7	37,848	19.5	35.1	25.3	9.6	3.4	2.0	3.6	0.9	0.6	26.5	71.9
Töreboda	Västra Götaland	76.1	5,322	39.3	13.7	7.3	10.9	7.4	14.6	3.7	2.3	0.9	50.3	46.5
Uddevalla	Västra Götaland	79.4	29,226	43.3	11.8	12.5	10.7	9.1	5.3	4.1	2.4	0.7	56.6	40.3
Ulricehamn	Västra Götaland	82.1	13,755	35.1	12.6	11.3	15.4	6.3	13.3	4.0	0.5	1.6	45.4	52.5
Umeå	Västerbotten	82.1	64,250	43.9	7.8	11.8	7.5	12.6	8.6	6.5	0.3	1.0	63.0	35.7
Upplands-Bro	Stockholm	79.9	11,384	39.4	18.0	15.5	10.9	7.9	2.8	3.8	0.8	0.9	51.1	47.2
Upplands Väsby	Stockholm	79.1	20,454	38.8	18.7	16.4	8.3	8.3	2.4	4.5	1.1	1.5	51.6	45.8
Uppsala	Uppsala	81.7	107,842	33.7	15.1	18.6	8.9	9.4	5.1	6.9	1.5	0.9	50.0	47.6
Uppvidinge	Kronoberg	80.1	5,738	43.4	10.6	6.8	9.0	8.9	15.9	2.7	2.4	0.3	55.1	42.2
Vadstena	Östergötland	82.1	4,826	40.7	16.7	10.2	12.0	5.3	6.8	4.8	0.6	2.8	50.8	45.8
Vaggeryd	Jönköping	83.1	7,584	40.5	10.7	6.6	24.8	5.0	7.4	2.6	1.0	1.3	48.1	49.6
Valdemarsvik	Östergötland	80.7	5,123	43.4	13.9	7.7	9.1	5.8	15.5	3.4	0.4	0.8	52.6	46.2
Vallentuna	Stockholm	82.8	14,725	29.7	22.3	19.2	11.2	5.5	4.5	5.7	1.2	0.8	40.9	57.1
Vansbro	Dalarna	75.2	4,132	42.2	9.0	6.9	10.8	9.0	16.0	3.1	1.4	1.8	54.2	42.6
Vara	Västra Götaland	78.6	9,492	33.3	19.6	8.9	12.5	5.6	16.2	2.7	1.0	0.3	41.5	57.1
Varberg	Halland	81.8	32,682	39.0	13.8	11.0	9.9	7.0	11.4	4.0	1.3	2.5	50.0	46.1
Vaxholm	Stockholm	85.5	5,758	25.7	26.3	23.1	9.7	5.7	3.6	4.9	0.6	0.5	36.3	62.6
Vellinge	Skåne	87.6	20,179	23.8	38.6	18.4	7.9	1.4	2.3	1.9	3.3	2.3	27.1	67.2
Vetlanda	Jönköping	81.9	16,330	38.2	11.2	8.1	19.7	5.8	12.2	3.0	0.8	1.0	47.0	51.2
Vilhelmina	Västerbotten	77.9	4,589	48.2	3.2	8.7	11.4	10.2	12.7	3.3	0.6	1.7	61.8	35.9
Vimmerby	Kalmar	79.4	9,314	41.2	11.0	6.4	12.7	6.1	18.3	3.2	0.8	0.4	50.5	48.3
Vindeln	Västerbotten	75.7	3,498	39.5	8.6	9.5	11.3	7.4	19.9	2.3	0.3	1.3	49.2	49.3
Vingåker	Södermanland	82.2	5,598	53.0	11.1	8.6	8.2	5.0	7.5	5.0	0.7	0.9	63.0	35.4
Vårgårda	Västra Götaland	82.0	6,295	31.3	10.6	10.0	23.4	6.3	12.3	4.2	0.6	1.3	41.8	56.3
Vänersborg	Västra Götaland	80.4	22,123	44.0	11.2	11.3	10.3	9.6	7.5	4.3	0.9	0.9	57.9	40.2
Vännäs	Västerbotten	77.9	4,871	44.8	5.5	6.9	8.9	11.5	18.6	3.2	0.4	0.2	59.5	39.9
Värmdö	Stockholm	82.6	18,121	32.4	24.2	18.1	8.7	7.0	2.5	5.6	0.8	0.7	45.0	53.5
Värnamo	Jönköping	81.7	19,293	40.1	12.3	8.8	20.9	4.0	8.8	2.7	1.3	1.0	46.8	50.8
Västervik	Kalmar	78.7	22,349	45.0	11.6	10.9	9.0	8.5	9.7	3.9	0.8	0.5	57.4	41.3
Västerås	Västmanland	78.7	74,410	42.4	14.5	16.7	8.2	7.3	3.2	4.9	1.2	1.7	54.6	42.6
Växjö	Kronoberg	82.5	46,631	38.8	15.9	12.3	10.0	8.2	7.6	4.9	1.5	0.8	51.9	45.8
Ydre	Östergötland	84.7	2,563	33.0	10.4	8.3	21.4	4.3	16.9	4.8	0.0	0.8	42.1	57.0
Ystad	Skåne	77.9	15,962	44.0	19.7	11.6	6.4	4.6	5.9	2.9	2.9	1.8	51.6	43.7
Åmål	Västra Götaland	77.4	7,400	46.7	9.7	9.4	10.1	6.9	11.4	4.0	0.7	1.0	57.7	40.6
Ånge	Västernorrland	76.1	6,484	50.1	7.0	6.2	6.4	12.0	12.6	3.3	1.0	1.4	65.4	32.2
Åre	Jämtland	79.2	5,640	37.3	12.2	7.7	7.0	8.7	17.1	6.7	0.1	3.1	52.7	44.1
Årjäng	Värmland	74.2	5,108	29.3	9.8	27.0	10.7	5.5	14.3	2.1	0.7	0.6	36.9	61.8
Åsele	Västerbotten	80.0	2,208	52.4	5.2	5.8	6.0	9.1	17.2	1.9	0.4	2.0	63.4	34.1
Åstorp	Skåne	74.2	6,855	47.3	17.8	8.5	9.7	5.3	4.4	2.2	3.8	1.1	54.7	40.4
Åtvidaberg	Östergötland	83.3	7,389	49.0	11.0	7.7	10.1	6.7	9.7	3.7	0.7	1.4	59.4	38.5
Älmhult	Kronoberg	79.8	9,343	44.5	14.8	8.7	10.7	4.7	11.4	3.3	1.3	0.5	52.6	45.6
Älvdalen	Dalarna	71.5	4,259	43.2	7.9	8.9	8.5	7.9	13.6	4.3	0.8	4.8	55.4	39.0
Älvkarleby	Uppsala	79.5	5,317	61.2	6.8	8.2	4.8	10.0	3.2	3.5	2.3	0.1	74.7	22.9
Älvsbyn	Norrbotten	82.7	5,618	53.6	4.0	4.0	6.2	15.0	7.5	2.4	0.2	7.2	71.0	21.7
Ängelholm	Skåne	79.1	22,559	31.9	24.0	13.6	12.4	4.0	5.8	3.8	2.3	2.1	39.7	55.9
Öckerö	Västra Götaland	84.9	7,482	27.7	18.8	13.4	27.3	6.2	1.8	3.7	0.6	0.4	37.6	61.3
Ödeshög	Östergötland	80.7	3,411	38.1	12.2	5.9	18.4	5.5	14.0	4.6	0.3	1.1	48.1	50.4
Örebro	Örebro	82.5	76,771	41.8	12.1	14.2	10.2	9.0	4.6	5.2	1.8	1.3	55.9	41.1
Örkelljunga	Skåne	75.0	5,181	32.0	17.8	10.1	21.4	3.7	7.3	2.5	3.0	2.2	38.3	56.6
Örnsköldsvik	Västernorrland	81.3	34,862	51.8	6.4	8.0	10.3	7.0	12.0	2.6	0.1	1.7	61.4	36.7
Östersund	Jämtland	78.7	35,621	43.2	11.1	9.2	5.2	11.0	13.2	5.8	0.3	1.1	59.9	38.6
Österåker	Stockholm	83.4	20,536	31.7	24.0	19.7	9.8	5.6	2.6	4.9	0.8	0.9	42.2	56.1
Östhammar	Uppsala	78.2	12,616	46.0	12.9	8.7	7.9	6.5	12.2	3.9	1.2	0.6	56.4	41.7
Östra Göinge	Skåne	78.3	8,038	49.1	12.5	7.8	9.4	7.3	7.0	3.4	2.1	1.4	59.8	36.7
Överkalix	Norrbotten	80.7	2,616	53.7	3.6	3.2	3.5	13.1	9.3	3.3	0.2	10.3	70.0	19.6
Övertorneå	Norrbotten	74.7	2,929	36.8	6.4	2.6	6.1	12.8	11.8	3.1	0.1	20.3	52.7	26.9
		80.1	5,303,212	39.9	15.3	13.4	9.2	8.4	6.2	4.7	1.4	1.7	52.9	44.0
Source: val.se

== Municipal results ==
Votes by municipality. The municipalities are the color of the party that got the most votes within the coalition that won relative majority.

Cartogram of the map to the left with each municipality rescaled to the number of valid votes cast.

Map showing the voting shifts from the 1998 to the 2002 election. Darker blue indicates a municipality voted more towards the parties that formed the centre-right bloc. Darker red indicates a municipality voted more towards the parties that form the left-wing bloc.

Votes by municipality as a scale from red/Left-wing bloc to blue/Centre-right bloc.

Cartogram of vote with each municipality rescaled in proportion to number of valid votes cast. Deeper blue represents a relative majority for the centre-right coalition, brighter red represents a relative majority for the left-wing coalition.

=== Blekinge ===
Location	Turnout	Share	Votes	S	M	FP	KD	V	C	MP	SD	Other	L-vote	R-vote	Left	Right	Margin
Location	%	%		%	%	%	%	%	%	%	%	%			%	%	
Karlshamn	81.3	20.5	19,346	47.4	11.6	10.3	7.5	10.3	5.4	4.6	2.7	0.2	12,051	6,729	62.3	34.8	5,322
Karlskrona	84.5	41.5	39,277	43.7	13.8	12.1	9.9	7.2	6.1	4.0	2.6	0.3	21,549	16,579	54.9	42.2	4,970
Olofström	79.2	8.4	7,946	51.9	8.2	9.4	9.0	8.7	6.3	2.8	3.2	0.4	5,037	2,621	63.4	33.0	2,416
Ronneby	81.6	19.0	17,974	45.6	12.7	10.6	7.8	9.0	7.3	3.8	3.0	0.2	10,477	6,917	58.3	38.5	3,560
Sölvesborg	80.2	10.6	10,015	45.1	18.6	9.4	8.7	7.1	5.1	3.0	2.7	0.4	5,522	4,187	55.1	41.8	1,335
Total	82.3	1.8	94,558	45.7	13.2	11.1	8.8	8.3	6.1	3.8	2.8	0.3	54,636	37,033	57.8	39.2	17,603
Source: SCB

=== Dalarna ===
Location	Turnout	Share	Votes	S	M	FP	KD	V	C	MP	SD	Other	L-vote	R-vote	Left	Right	Margin
Location	%	%		%	%	%	%	%	%	%	%	%			%	%	
Avesta	77.4	8.1	13,254	50.0	9.6	8.8	7.0	9.7	9.5	3.5	0.8	1.1	8,392	4,610	63.3	34.8	3,782
Borlänge	78.2	16.8	27,313	48.6	10.4	9.5	6.2	10.0	6.2	5.2	1.8	2.2	17,406	8,814	63.7	32.3	8,592
Falun	79.2	20.0	32,593	38.4	15.3	12.5	7.5	8.6	8.4	5.6	1.1	2.7	17,136	14,245	52.6	43.7	2,891
Gagnef	79.4	3.6	5,802	40.4	9.9	8.9	10.6	7.3	15.1	4.5	0.8	2.5	3,030	2,581	52.2	44.5	449
Hedemora	75.8	5.5	8,916	42.9	10.6	7.6	7.9	10.4	12.9	5.1	0.6	2.0	5,210	3,478	58.4	39.0	1,732
Leksand	80.5	5.8	9,428	34.9	12.5	10.2	13.1	7.7	14.1	4.8	0.8	1.9	4,468	4,704	47.4	49.9	236
Ludvika	77.5	9.5	15,521	53.9	8.9	7.7	5.9	13.2	4.6	3.9	1.1	0.9	11,014	4,204	71.0	27.1	6,810
Malung	79.2	4.0	6,484	42.7	14.5	10.0	6.6	9.5	11.3	2.6	0.6	2.2	3,560	2,748	54.9	42.4	812
Mora	76.1	7.2	11,660	39.0	12.2	11.0	8.6	8.2	12.2	5.2	1.0	2.8	6,104	5,121	52.4	43.9	983
Orsa	76.3	2.5	4,015	36.9	10.3	9.1	8.2	10.2	13.6	6.0	2.8	2.9	2,131	1,657	53.1	41.3	474
Rättvik	76.4	4.0	6,497	38.9	12.8	11.3	8.1	6.7	14.6	4.5	0.8	2.2	3,262	3,040	50.2	46.8	222
Smedjebacken	77.8	4.1	6,693	55.1	9.4	6.9	5.1	11.5	6.6	3.7	0.5	1.1	4,708	1,877	70.3	28.0	2,831
Säter	78.0	4.0	6,445	39.3	11.7	8.3	8.5	9.8	15.6	4.0	0.9	1.9	3,425	2,841	53.1	44.1	584
Vansbro	75.2	2.5	4,132	42.2	9.0	6.9	10.8	9.0	16.0	3.1	1.4	1.8	2,240	1,762	54.2	42.6	478
Älvdalen	71.5	2.6	4,259	43.2	7.9	8.9	8.5	7.9	13.6	4.3	0.8	4.8	2,359	1,659	55.4	39.0	700
Total	77.7	3.1	163,012	43.8	11.6	9.7	7.7	9.5	9.9	4.7	1.1	2.1	94,445	63,341	57.9	38.9	31,104
Source: SCB

=== Gotland ===
Location	Turnout	Share	Votes	S	M	FP	KD	V	C	MP	SD	Other	L-vote	R-vote	Left	Right	Margin
Location	%	%		%	%	%	%	%	%	%	%	%			%	%	
Gotland	79.0	100.0	34,336	40.8	14.0	7.9	6.5	8.5	15.6	5.5	0.6	0.5	18,833	15,118	54.8	44.0	3,715
Total	79.0	0.7	34,336	40.8	14.0	7.9	6.5	8.5	15.6	5.5	0.6	0.5	18,833	15,118	54.8	44.0	3,715
Source: SCB

=== Gävleborg ===
Location	Turnout	Share	Votes	S	M	FP	KD	V	C	MP	SD	Other	L-vote	R-vote	Left	Right	Margin
Location	%	%		%	%	%	%	%	%	%	%	%			%	%	
Bollnäs	79.7	9.9	16,359	37.2	9.6	11.4	7.5	9.1	18.1	4.8	0.8	1.3	8,364	7,638	51.1	46.7	726
Gävle	78.8	33.0	54,396	46.5	11.8	12.9	7.4	10.0	4.4	5.0	1.5	0.6	33,422	19,828	61.4	36.5	13,594
Hofors	76.6	3.6	5,992	56.4	6.5	7.7	4.3	15.4	5.1	3.3	1.2	0.2	4,499	1,411	75.1	23.5	3,088
Hudiksvall	75.4	13.0	21,364	42.6	8.1	7.8	7.1	11.8	15.0	5.6	0.6	1.4	12,824	8,107	60.0	37.9	4,717
Ljusdal	71.9	6.7	11,069	41.8	8.2	9.0	7.4	12.9	14.6	4.4	0.9	0.8	6,551	4,330	59.2	39.1	2,221
Nordanstig	74.3	3.5	5,717	39.4	7.0	7.9	8.6	9.2	20.0	4.5	0.7	2.7	3,036	2,488	53.1	43.5	548
Ockelbo	76.1	2.2	3,586	46.9	6.7	6.6	5.9	13.4	15.4	2.8	0.8	1.4	2,262	1,243	63.1	34.7	1,019
Ovanåker	80.6	4.7	7,670	35.7	7.4	8.0	13.8	6.8	23.2	3.7	0.3	1.0	3,547	4,022	46.3	52.4	475
Sandviken	79.1	13.6	22,454	51.8	9.1	8.5	6.5	11.8	6.5	3.7	1.1	1.1	15,097	6,870	67.2	30.6	8,227
Söderhamn	77.8	9.9	16,327	45.1	7.6	8.2	7.0	15.0	10.9	3.7	0.8	1.7	10,416	5,508	63.8	33.7	4,908
Total	77.6	3.1	164,934	45.0	9.4	10.0	7.4	11.2	10.4	4.5	1.0	1.1	100,018	61,445	60.6	37.3	38,573
Source: SCB

=== Halland ===
Location	Turnout	Share	Votes	S	M	FP	KD	V	C	MP	SD	Other	L-vote	R-vote	Left	Right	Margin
Location	%	%		%	%	%	%	%	%	%	%	%			%	%	
Falkenberg	81.2	13.9	23,397	36.8	14.3	11.3	9.0	5.5	15.0	3.8	1.2	3.0	10,777	11,626	46.1	49.7	849
Halmstad	80.2	31.1	52,342	40.9	16.4	13.9	8.5	6.9	5.8	4.2	0.7	2.9	27,194	23,310	52.0	44.5	3,884
Hylte	79.7	3.6	5,983	42.3	11.5	9.0	8.7	4.6	17.3	2.9	1.1	2.7	2,977	2,783	49.8	46.5	194
Kungsbacka	84.3	24.0	40,439	26.2	24.5	19.8	12.1	4.7	5.9	3.8	1.2	1.9	14,023	25,178	34.7	62.3	11,155
Laholm	79.1	8.0	13,404	33.0	16.6	10.2	11.5	4.8	16.4	3.6	1.2	2.7	5,543	7,333	41.4	54.7	1,790
Varberg	81.8	19.4	32,682	39.0	13.8	11.0	9.9	7.0	11.4	4.0	1.3	2.5	16,354	15,077	50.0	46.1	1,277
Total	81.5	3.2	168,247	35.8	17.4	13.9	9.9	5.9	9.5	3.9	1.0	2.6	76,868	85,307	45.7	50.7	8,439
Source: SCB

=== Jämtland ===
Location	Turnout	Share	Votes	S	M	FP	KD	V	C	MP	SD	Other	L-vote	R-vote	Left	Right	Margin
Location	%	%		%	%	%	%	%	%	%	%	%			%	%	
Berg	77.2	6.2	4,729	39.0	8.6	5.4	6.8	10.0	22.1	5.3	0.3	2.5	2,572	2,027	54.4	42.9	545
Bräcke	75.0	5.6	4,283	52.2	8.3	5.5	2.6	11.4	14.9	3.3	0.1	1.6	2,867	1,342	66.9	31.3	1,525
Härjedalen	74.9	8.7	6,650	50.2	9.8	6.1	4.7	12.2	11.6	3.7	0.3	1.5	4,395	2,135	66.1	32.1	2,260
Krokom	78.7	10.6	8,160	41.8	9.1	5.4	5.2	9.6	20.6	6.4	0.3	1.6	4,717	3,288	57.8	40.3	1,429
Ragunda	74.6	4.6	3,526	49.4	7.7	4.0	3.2	12.0	18.0	3.2	0.2	2.4	2,276	1,159	64.5	32.9	1,117
Strömsund	78.4	10.7	8,256	50.8	6.5	4.7	4.3	13.3	15.3	3.1	0.3	1.7	5,548	2,543	67.2	30.8	3,005
Åre	79.2	7.3	5,640	37.3	12.2	7.7	7.0	8.7	17.1	6.7	0.1	3.1	2,971	2,485	52.7	44.1	486
Östersund	78.7	46.3	35,621	43.2	11.1	9.2	5.2	11.0	13.2	5.8	0.3	1.1	21,346	13,761	59.9	38.6	7,585
Total	77.8	1.4	76,865	44.6	9.9	7.2	5.0	11.0	15.2	5.2	0.3	1.6	46,692	28,740	60.7	37.4	17,952
Source: SCB

=== Jönköping ===
Location	Turnout	Share	Votes	S	M	FP	KD	V	C	MP	SD	Other	L-vote	R-vote	Left	Right	Margin
Location	%	%		%	%	%	%	%	%	%	%	%			%	%	
Aneby	83.8	2.0	4,074	34.4	9.2	7.4	28.3	4.3	11.6	2.9	0.6	1.4	1,696	2,297	41.6	56.4	601
Eksjö	82.1	5.3	10,516	37.1	13.2	9.0	19.4	4.9	11.3	3.6	0.8	0.8	4,787	5,558	45.5	52.9	771
Gislaved	79.8	8.4	16,781	41.4	14.1	8.9	14.7	4.7	10.6	2.7	1.5	1.3	8,202	8,109	48.9	48.3	93
Gnosjö	80.6	2.8	5,577	34.4	12.9	7.5	30.6	3.6	6.6	1.9	1.5	0.9	2,226	3,215	39.9	57.6	989
Habo	84.3	2.8	5,670	36.0	14.9	9.4	23.7	5.1	6.1	2.9	0.4	1.6	2,493	3,067	44.0	54.1	574
Jönköping	82.6	36.7	72,976	39.7	13.2	10.7	19.9	6.5	4.1	3.6	1.0	1.3	36,361	34,937	49.8	47.9	1,424
Mullsjö	82.9	2.1	4,256	35.3	12.0	8.0	25.6	7.0	5.3	4.3	0.8	1.6	1,982	2,170	46.6	51.0	188
Nässjö	82.9	9.2	18,219	43.5	11.5	7.1	17.7	7.3	7.4	3.3	0.9	1.2	9,862	7,972	54.1	43.8	1,890
Sävsjö	81.7	3.4	6,671	32.6	12.9	6.0	25.6	4.5	13.6	2.2	1.4	1.3	2,619	3,873	39.3	58.1	1,254
Tranås	81.5	5.5	11,035	43.8	13.0	8.5	17.8	6.2	5.6	3.5	0.4	1.3	5,895	4,945	53.4	44.8	950
Vaggeryd	83.1	3.8	7,584	40.5	10.7	6.6	24.8	5.0	7.4	2.6	1.0	1.3	3,647	3,760	48.1	49.6	113
Vetlanda	81.9	8.2	16,330	38.2	11.2	8.1	19.7	5.8	12.2	3.0	0.8	1.0	7,682	8,366	47.0	51.2	684
Värnamo	81.7	9.7	19,293	40.1	12.3	8.8	20.9	4.0	8.8	2.7	1.3	1.0	9,035	9,802	46.8	50.8	767
Total	82.1	3.8	198,982	39.5	12.7	9.0	20.3	5.7	7.3	3.2	1.0	1.2	96,487	98,071	48.5	49.3	1,584
Source: SCB

=== Kalmar ===
Location	Turnout	Share	Votes	S	M	FP	KD	V	C	MP	SD	Other	L-vote	R-vote	Left	Right	Margin
Location	%	%		%	%	%	%	%	%	%	%	%			%	%	
Borgholm	79.9	4.9	7,058	28.6	16.0	8.7	14.5	5.7	21.3	4.0	0.5	0.8	2,704	4,264	38.3	60.4	1,560
Emmaboda	81.7	4.1	5,972	50.4	9.8	5.5	9.9	5.8	13.3	3.3	0.8	1.3	3,553	2,299	59.5	38.5	1,254
Hultsfred	79.6	6.2	8,893	46.2	9.1	5.4	12.3	8.2	14.1	2.3	1.8	0.5	5,046	3,639	56.7	40.9	1,407
Högsby	81.6	2.7	3,854	46.1	9.6	5.3	14.3	8.2	12.8	2.3	0.8	0.5	2,184	1,618	56.7	42.0	566
Kalmar	82.3	26.0	37,529	42.9	15.4	11.4	9.9	7.1	6.1	4.7	0.7	1.8	20,545	16,046	54.7	42.8	4,499
Mönsterås	81.4	5.6	8,079	47.8	10.4	7.0	10.2	7.9	11.5	2.9	0.9	1.4	4,739	3,155	58.7	39.1	1,584
Mörbylånga	83.0	5.8	8,410	37.7	15.3	10.5	12.0	6.4	13.2	3.9	0.4	0.7	4,031	4,290	47.9	51.0	259
Nybro	80.6	8.4	12,136	46.8	10.8	7.0	11.0	7.6	11.6	2.3	0.5	2.6	6,875	4,883	56.6	40.2	1,992
Oskarshamn	80.7	11.2	16,160	47.7	12.5	8.3	13.7	8.1	5.2	3.0	1.0	0.5	9,508	6,421	58.8	39.7	3,087
Torsås	79.4	3.1	4,474	39.1	13.1	6.5	12.9	4.5	19.2	3.5	0.6	0.6	2,104	2,317	47.0	51.8	213
Vimmerby	79.4	6.5	9,314	41.2	11.0	6.4	12.7	6.1	18.3	3.2	0.8	0.4	4,704	4,501	50.5	48.3	203
Västervik	78.7	15.5	22,349	45.0	11.6	10.9	9.0	8.5	9.7	3.9	0.8	0.5	12,825	9,235	57.4	41.3	3,590
Total	80.7	2.7	144,228	43.7	12.7	8.9	11.2	7.3	10.6	3.6	0.8	1.1	78,818	62,688	54.6	43.5	16,150
Source: SCB

=== Kronoberg ===
Location	Turnout	Share	Votes	S	M	FP	KD	V	C	MP	SD	Other	L-vote	R-vote	Left	Right	Margin
Location	%	%		%	%	%	%	%	%	%	%	%			%	%	
Alvesta	81.0	10.6	11,374	40.2	13.0	8.8	11.2	7.2	13.6	3.3	2.2	0.7	5,755	5,294	50.6	46.5	461
Lessebo	82.5	4.7	5,024	53.2	10.1	7.5	6.5	9.4	8.1	3.6	1.2	0.4	3,327	1,615	66.2	32.1	1,712
Ljungby	80.0	15.0	16,160	39.5	12.2	8.5	12.9	6.5	14.4	3.9	1.2	0.9	8,072	7,746	50.0	47.9	326
Markaryd	77.4	5.2	5,595	44.2	11.8	6.6	16.1	5.0	10.0	2.6	3.0	0.8	2,897	2,487	51.8	44.5	410
Tingsryd	78.2	7.3	7,861	36.5	14.9	6.2	11.9	6.0	17.7	3.3	2.2	1.2	3,600	3,992	45.8	50.8	392
Uppvidinge	80.1	5.3	5,738	43.4	10.6	6.8	9.0	8.9	15.9	2.7	2.4	0.3	3,159	2,421	55.1	42.2	738
Växjö	82.5	43.3	46,631	38.8	15.9	12.3	10.0	8.2	7.6	4.9	1.5	0.8	24,189	21,364	51.9	45.8	2,825
Älmhult	79.8	8.7	9,343	44.5	14.8	8.7	10.7	4.7	11.4	3.3	1.3	0.5	4,915	4,260	52.6	45.6	655
Total	80.9	2.0	107,726	40.6	14.1	9.8	10.9	7.3	10.9	4.0	1.7	0.8	55,914	49,179	51.9	45.7	6,735
Source: SCB

=== Norrbotten ===
Location	Turnout	Share	Votes	S	M	FP	KD	V	C	MP	SD	NBP	Other	L-vote	R-vote	Left	Right	Margin
Location	%	%		%	%	%	%	%	%	%	%	%	%			%	%	
Arjeplog	77.0	1.3	1,981	45.8	3.9	5.5	5.7	14.8	9.3	4.5	0.0	10.3	0.3	1,291	481	65.2	24.3	810
Arvidsjaur	79.2	2.9	4,425	53.9	5.1	5.4	4.3	14.5	7.5	1.9	0.0	6.6	0.8	3,110	985	70.3	22.3	2,125
Boden	82.2	11.5	17,850	47.3	10.0	6.8	5.2	11.6	3.9	5.0	0.2	9.7	0.2	11,404	4,629	63.9	25.9	6,775
Gällivare	75.5	7.4	11,484	41.9	7.0	4.0	3.4	16.6	1.9	4.9	0.8	18.4	1.2	7,281	1,871	63.4	16.3	5,410
Haparanda	67.2	2.6	4,079	44.8	11.5	3.9	5.5	9.8	10.8	4.2	0.2	9.1	0.1	2,400	1,293	58.8	31.7	1,107
Jokkmokk	78.8	2.3	3,544	45.3	4.1	5.4	3.7	13.5	3.2	8.7	0.0	15.7	0.2	2,393	585	67.5	16.5	1,808
Kalix	82.3	7.2	11,126	53.4	6.4	4.9	4.0	10.1	6.2	8.8	0.2	5.6	0.4	8,046	2,390	72.3	21.5	5,656
Kiruna	77.6	8.8	13,709	40.9	4.5	4.2	3.9	14.8	1.9	5.3	0.5	23.6	0.4	8,368	1,980	61.0	14.4	6,388
Luleå	82.3	28.9	44,770	47.0	9.9	9.8	5.8	11.6	4.8	6.2	0.2	4.0	0.6	29,029	13,578	64.8	30.3	15,451
Pajala	78.2	2.8	4,392	35.5	5.0	2.2	7.9	19.5	4.2	2.5	0.0	21.7	1.4	2,528	851	57.6	19.4	1,677
Piteå	84.9	17.1	26,455	55.5	4.7	6.2	6.4	11.9	6.1	4.0	0.4	4.4	0.5	18,879	6,199	71.4	23.4	12,680
Älvsbyn	82.7	3.6	5,618	53.6	4.0	4.0	6.2	15.0	7.5	2.4	0.2	6.5	0.7	3,989	1,218	71.0	21.7	2,771
Överkalix	80.7	1.7	2,616	53.7	3.6	3.2	3.5	13.1	9.3	3.3	0.2	10.1	0.2	1,832	512	70.0	19.6	1,320
Övertorneå	74.7	1.9	2,929	36.8	6.4	2.6	6.1	12.8	11.8	3.1	0.1	20.2	0.1	1,545	788	52.7	26.9	757
Total	80.7	2.9	154,978	47.9	7.2	6.5	5.3	12.7	5.1	5.2	0.3	9.4	0.5	102,095	37,360	65.9	24.1	64,735
Source: SCB

=== Skåne ===
==== Malmö ====
Location	Turnout	Share	Votes	S	M	FP	KD	V	C	MP	SD	Other	L-vote	R-vote	Left	Right	Margin
Location	%	%		%	%	%	%	%	%	%	%	%			%	%	
Malmö	76.0	100.0	147,134	42.4	16.5	13.8	5.3	7.6	1.2	4.3	3.8	5.3	79,820	54,051	54.2	36.7	25,769
Total	76.0	2.8	147,134	42.4	16.5	13.8	5.3	7.6	1.2	4.3	3.8	5.3	79,820	54,051	54.2	36.7	25,769
Source: SCB

==== Skåne NE ====
Location	Turnout	Share	Votes	S	M	FP	KD	V	C	MP	SD	Other	L-vote	R-vote	Left	Right	Margin
Location	%	%		%	%	%	%	%	%	%	%	%			%	%	
Bromölla	78.0	4.2	7,080	56.4	9.3	7.7	7.0	8.7	3.8	2.9	3.4	0.7	4,819	1,972	68.1	27.9	2,847
Båstad	79.8	5.2	8,799	21.4	27.1	15.4	14.9	3.1	11.3	3.6	2.5	0.6	2,468	6,050	28.0	68.8	3,582
Hässleholm	77.8	16.7	28,345	38.5	15.1	10.5	13.0	5.6	8.8	4.1	3.5	0.9	13,637	13,467	48.1	47.5	170
Klippan	73.7	5.0	8,496	40.5	18.9	9.3	11.8	4.5	7.3	2.7	2.7	2.2	4,057	4,023	47.8	47.4	34
Kristianstad	79.0	26.2	44,401	41.6	16.7	14.0	9.1	5.9	4.9	3.8	2.3	1.6	22,796	19,880	51.3	44.8	2,916
Osby	78.0	4.4	7,490	46.0	10.9	8.3	11.4	7.2	9.1	3.2	3.0	0.8	4,226	2,976	56.4	39.7	1,250
Perstorp	75.0	2.2	3,705	42.9	15.8	10.8	9.3	7.7	7.2	2.2	1.7	2.5	1,954	1,594	52.7	43.0	360
Simrishamn	76.6	6.8	11,542	35.7	19.8	11.9	9.1	6.7	9.0	3.9	2.5	1.4	5,339	5,752	46.3	49.8	413
Tomelilla	73.7	4.1	6,930	37.5	18.4	9.7	8.1	5.3	12.0	3.2	5.0	0.9	3,180	3,342	45.9	48.2	162
Åstorp	74.2	4.0	6,855	47.3	17.8	8.5	9.7	5.3	4.4	2.2	3.8	1.1	3,750	2,770	54.7	40.4	980
Ängelholm	79.1	13.3	22,559	31.9	24.0	13.6	12.4	4.0	5.8	3.8	2.3	2.1	8,948	12,603	39.7	55.9	3,655
Örkelljunga	75.0	3.1	5,181	32.0	17.8	10.1	21.4	3.7	7.3	2.5	3.0	2.2	1,982	2,930	38.3	56.6	948
Östra Göinge	78.3	4.7	8,038	49.1	12.5	7.8	9.4	7.3	7.0	3.4	2.1	1.4	4,808	2,948	59.8	36.7	1,860
Total	77.6	3.2	169,421	39.2	17.7	11.7	11.0	5.6	7.1	3.5	2.8	1.4	81,964	80,307	48.4	47.4	1,657
Source: SCB

==== Skåne S ====
Location	Turnout	Share	Votes	S	M	FP	KD	V	C	MP	SD	Other	L-vote	R-vote	Left	Right	Margin
Location	%	%		%	%	%	%	%	%	%	%	%			%	%	
Burlöv	79.8	4.4	8,682	48.2	14.2	11.9	5.2	6.3	2.3	2.7	6.5	2.6	4,973	2,923	57.3	33.7	2,050
Kävlinge	83.3	7.7	15,224	43.0	18.1	13.8	6.4	4.1	4.3	2.6	6.0	1.6	7,579	6,487	49.8	42.6	1,092
Lomma	88.1	6.0	11,883	32.0	26.7	19.9	7.7	2.6	2.5	3.1	3.4	2.1	4,478	6,757	37.7	56.9	2,279
Lund	84.2	31.8	63,077	34.2	16.9	20.6	5.7	9.1	3.3	7.2	1.7	1.2	31,898	29,300	50.6	46.5	2,598
Sjöbo	75.8	4.8	9,561	36.7	18.4	9.1	9.3	4.8	10.8	2.8	5.0	3.2	4,229	4,544	44.2	47.5	315
Skurup	77.9	4.0	7,961	39.9	17.6	11.2	7.1	4.8	9.5	2.6	5.7	1.6	3,770	3,613	47.4	45.4	157
Staffanstorp	85.0	6.1	12,191	41.7	20.7	14.7	7.0	3.3	3.9	2.4	3.6	2.7	5,770	5,656	47.3	46.4	114
Svedala	83.6	5.5	10,943	44.5	16.6	13.5	6.9	3.8	4.0	2.5	6.3	1.9	5,571	4,479	50.9	40.9	1,092
Trelleborg	78.6	11.4	22,565	48.1	15.0	9.8	7.1	4.1	4.1	2.8	4.9	4.0	12,428	8,134	55.1	36.0	4,294
Vellinge	87.6	10.2	20,179	23.8	38.6	18.4	7.9	1.4	2.3	1.9	3.3	2.3	5,478	13,560	27.1	67.2	8,082
Ystad	77.9	8.1	15,962	44.0	19.7	11.6	6.4	4.6	5.9	2.9	2.9	1.8	8,239	6,973	51.6	43.7	1,266
Total	82.5	3.7	198,228	38.1	20.0	15.8	6.7	5.5	4.2	4.1	3.7	2.1	94,413	92,426	47.6	46.6	1,987
Source: SCB

==== Skåne W ====
Location	Turnout	Share	Votes	S	M	FP	KD	V	C	MP	SD	Other	L-vote	R-vote	Left	Right	Margin
Location	%	%		%	%	%	%	%	%	%	%	%			%	%	
Bjuv	74.4	4.8	7,254	53.3	12.9	8.6	7.3	5.9	3.7	2.2	5.0	1.2	4,447	2,359	61.3	32.5	2,088
Eslöv	77.6	10.7	16,158	45.6	14.1	10.8	5.9	5.2	9.4	3.2	4.5	1.3	8,717	6,494	53.9	40.2	2,223
Helsingborg	76.5	45.5	68,381	39.0	18.8	15.1	8.4	5.9	2.1	3.6	4.0	3.0	33,141	30,391	48.5	44.4	2,750
Höganäs	82.4	9.5	14,277	32.7	22.8	16.2	11.5	4.7	4.0	3.6	2.7	1.8	5,857	7,781	41.0	54.5	1,924
Hörby	82.4	5.2	7,805	33.6	14.6	11.5	10.1	14.3	3.6	3.5	5.6	3.2	3,180	3,941	40.7	50.5	761
Höör	77.6	5.3	7,952	35.4	17.0	13.1	9.1	4.9	7.7	4.7	4.4	3.6	3,585	3,725	45.1	46.8	140
Landskrona	77.1	14.2	21,382	44.4	16.4	13.6	5.7	6.3	2.2	2.5	6.2	2.7	11,375	8,098	53.2	37.9	3,277
Svalöv	79.9	4.8	7,240	41.0	15.2	9.6	7.3	4.1	12.7	2.8	4.9	2.3	3,472	3,244	48.0	44.8	228
Total	77.3	2.8	150,449	40.2	17.6	13.7	8.1	5.5	4.6	3.3	4.5	2.6	73,774	66,033	49.0	43.9	7,741
Source: SCB

=== Stockholm County ===
==== Stockholm ====
Location	Turnout	Share	Votes	S	M	FP	KD	V	C	MP	SD	Other	L-vote	R-vote	Left	Right	Margin
Location	%	%		%	%	%	%	%	%	%	%	%			%	%	
Stockholm NE	81.5	18.7	86,166	18.2	33.7	25.9	7.2	6.2	1.6	5.8	0.7	0.6	25,935	59,039	30.1	68.5	33,104
Stockholm NW	75.1	14.2	64,992	39.5	16.8	15.6	7.4	11.0	1.8	5.2	1.2	1.2	36,243	27,130	55.8	41.7	9,113
Stockholm S	80.8	19.3	88,559	32.1	16.3	18.7	5.0	15.2	1.8	9.0	0.8	1.0	49,913	37,081	56.4	41.9	12,832
Stockholm SE	77.2	15.5	71,006	41.8	13.3	14.0	6.2	13.1	1.5	7.1	1.3	1.5	44,067	24,932	62.1	35.1	19,135
Stockholm SW	77.5	14.2	65,025	38.1	15.4	16.3	6.2	13.0	1.7	6.6	1.4	1.2	37,528	25,772	57.7	39.6	11,756
Stockholm W	81.8	16.1	73,702	23.5	26.9	24.9	7.7	7.1	2.0	6.2	0.9	0.8	27,113	45,343	36.8	61.5	18,230
Postal vote		1.9	8,555										3,663	4,755			1,092
Total	80.7	8.6	458,005	31.4	21.0	19.5	6.6	10.9	1.8	6.8	1.0	1.0	224,462	224,052	49.0	48.9	410
Source: SCB

==== Stockholm County ====
Location	Turnout	Share	Votes	S	M	FP	KD	V	C	MP	SD	Other	L-vote	R-vote	Left	Right	Margin
Location	%	%		%	%	%	%	%	%	%	%	%			%	%	
Botkyrka	74.1	5.6	34,748	43.1	13.8	14.3	9.6	10.3	1.6	4.7	1.2	1.4	20,205	13,645	58.1	39.3	6,560
Danderyd	87.6	3.1	19,171	11.2	45.1	24.7	10.7	2.1	1.9	3.2	0.5	0.7	3,153	15,783	16.4	82.3	12,630
Ekerö	86.2	2.2	13,635	25.8	26.1	20.4	10.5	5.2	3.8	6.4	0.8	1.0	5,100	8,291	37.4	60.8	3,191
Haninge	78.5	6.2	38,010	42.0	16.1	14.7	8.1	9.0	2.0	5.0	0.9	2.3	21,271	15,553	56.0	40.9	5,718
Huddinge	79.8	7.4	45,707	37.3	19.5	17.0	8.1	8.3	1.9	4.7	1.7	1.5	22,967	21,290	50.2	46.6	1,677
Järfälla	83.0	5.9	36,349	37.2	18.6	18.3	9.3	7.8	2.0	4.7	1.3	0.9	18,042	17,517	49.6	48.2	525
Lidingö	85.9	4.3	26,279	17.0	36.4	26.5	9.3	3.5	1.8	4.1	0.8	0.5	6,470	19,447	24.6	74.0	12,977
Nacka	83.2	7.2	44,243	26.9	27.4	22.0	7.9	6.9	1.7	5.4	0.9	0.9	17,340	26,121	39.2	59.0	8,781
Norrtälje	78.6	5.1	31,287	39.3	17.3	13.1	8.3	6.2	8.6	4.6	0.5	2.0	15,680	14,807	50.1	47.3	873
Nykvarn	83.0	0.7	4,570	42.9	17.6	14.0	8.2	5.2	4.8	4.2	1.9	1.2	2,390	2,038	52.3	44.6	352
Nynäshamn	79.9	2.3	14,196	42.8	15.8	13.2	8.7	8.8	3.6	4.9	1.8	0.5	8,021	5,853	56.5	41.2	2,168
Salem	83.7	1.3	7,778	36.2	19.8	18.5	9.5	6.0	2.2	5.0	1.6	1.1	3,675	3,898	47.2	50.1	223
Sigtuna	77.3	3.1	18,967	38.1	20.1	15.4	9.3	6.8	3.7	4.2	1.7	0.6	9,331	9,198	49.2	48.5	133
Sollentuna	84.6	5.6	34,550	29.2	24.5	21.5	9.9	5.9	2.5	4.7	1.0	0.6	13,757	20,226	39.8	58.5	6,469
Solna	80.2	5.8	35,575	33.3	21.8	19.4	6.9	9.3	1.8	5.5	0.9	1.1	17,113	17,734	48.1	49.8	621
Sundbyberg	78.5	3.3	20,069	37.3	19.2	17.2	6.4	9.7	2.0	5.6	1.5	1.1	10,579	8,974	52.7	44.7	1,605
Södertälje	76.2	6.6	40,914	42.3	14.5	12.9	9.7	7.5	3.4	6.0	0.7	3.1	22,818	16,549	55.8	40.4	6,269
Tyresö	83.2	3.6	22,313	35.2	21.8	18.4	7.8	7.2	2.0	4.9	1.0	1.6	10,576	11,158	47.4	50.0	582
Täby	86.7	6.1	37,848	19.5	35.1	25.3	9.6	3.4	2.0	3.6	0.9	0.6	10,022	27,230	26.5	71.9	17,208
Upplands-Bro	79.9	1.8	11,384	39.4	18.0	15.5	10.9	7.9	2.8	3.8	0.8	0.9	5,822	5,373	51.1	47.2	449
Upplands Väsby	79.1	3.3	20,454	38.8	18.7	16.4	8.3	8.3	2.4	4.5	1.1	1.5	10,562	9,360	51.6	45.8	1,202
Vallentuna	82.8	2.4	14,725	29.7	22.3	19.2	11.2	5.5	4.5	5.7	1.2	0.8	6,024	8,410	40.9	57.1	2,386
Vaxholm	85.5	0.9	5,758	25.7	26.3	23.1	9.7	5.7	3.6	4.9	0.6	0.5	2,088	3,607	36.3	62.6	1,519
Värmdö	82.6	2.9	18,121	32.4	24.2	18.1	8.7	7.0	2.5	5.6	0.8	0.7	8,154	9,700	45.0	53.5	1,546
Österåker	83.4	3.3	20,536	31.7	24.0	19.7	9.8	5.6	2.6	4.9	0.8	0.9	8,673	11,528	42.2	56.1	2,855
Total	81.1	11.6	617,187	33.5	22.4	18.4	8.9	7.0	2.7	4.9	1.0	1.2	279,833	323,290	45.3	52.4	43,457
Source: SCB

=== Södermanland ===
Location	Turnout	Share	Votes	S	M	FP	KD	V	C	MP	SD	Other	L-vote	R-vote	Left	Right	Margin
Location	%	%		%	%	%	%	%	%	%	%	%			%	%	
Eskilstuna	77.5	33.1	50,404	47.8	12.2	12.6	7.6	7.8	4.4	5.0	1.3	1.3	30,511	18,566	60.5	36.8	11,945
Flen	80.3	6.4	9,724	48.1	12.1	9.3	8.7	7.5	7.5	4.5	1.0	1.2	5,853	3,655	60.2	37.6	2,198
Gnesta	80.3	3.8	5,769	40.3	14.5	11.4	8.5	6.6	10.4	6.5	0.6	1.2	3,082	2,583	53.4	44.8	499
Katrineholm	81.2	12.8	19,543	52.7	10.9	9.8	7.8	5.6	6.0	5.0	1.2	1.0	12,367	6,744	63.3	34.5	5,623
Nyköping	82.7	20.2	30,854	47.4	13.0	11.3	9.3	7.4	6.0	4.3	0.8	0.6	18,239	12,203	59.1	39.6	6,036
Oxelösund	80.9	4.5	6,791	56.2	9.8	8.8	5.9	11.7	1.9	4.7	0.5	0.5	4,930	1,794	72.6	25.4	3,136
Strängnäs	80.1	11.5	17,534	38.5	18.4	16.3	9.5	5.9	5.4	4.5	0.5	1.1	8,571	8,692	48.9	49.6	121
Trosa	83.2	4.1	6,218	41.0	19.0	13.4	9.3	5.5	5.1	5.3	0.6	0.7	3,222	2,915	51.8	46.9	307
Vingåker	82.2	3.7	5,598	53.0	11.1	8.6	8.2	5.0	7.5	5.0	0.7	0.9	3,525	1,984	63.0	35.4	1,541
Total	80.0	2.9	152,435	47.3	13.1	11.9	8.3	7.1	5.5	4.8	1.0	1.0	90,300	59,136	59.2	38.8	31,164
Source: SCB

=== Uppsala ===
Location	Turnout	Share	Votes	S	M	FP	KD	V	C	MP	SD	Other	L-vote	R-vote	Left	Right	Margin
Location	%	%		%	%	%	%	%	%	%	%	%			%	%	
Enköping	79.2	12.3	21,716	40.0	16.3	10.8	9.6	5.4	11.4	3.5	0.8	2.1	10,619	10,462	48.9	48.2	157
Håbo	80.9	5.6	9,802	36.6	23.3	13.9	10.9	5.0	4.0	3.8	1.0	1.4	4,452	5,116	45.4	52.2	664
Knivsta	82.9	4.1	7,162	31.8	20.1	17.9	10.5	5.5	6.8	5.0	1.6	0.8	3,031	3,957	42.3	55.2	926
Tierp	78.9	6.8	11,947	50.7	8.2	8.1	7.7	7.3	12.5	3.7	1.5	0.4	7,381	4,347	61.8	36.4	3,034
Uppsala	81.7	61.1	107,842	33.7	15.1	18.6	8.9	9.4	5.1	6.9	1.5	0.9	53,895	51,358	50.0	47.6	2,537
Älvkarleby	79.5	3.0	5,317	61.2	6.8	8.2	4.8	10.0	3.2	3.5	2.3	0.1	3,973	1,218	74.7	22.9	2,755
Östhammar	78.2	7.2	12,616	46.0	12.9	8.7	7.9	6.5	12.2	3.9	1.2	0.6	7,118	5,266	56.4	41.7	1,852
Total	80.8	3.3	176,402	37.4	15.0	15.6	8.9	8.1	6.8	5.7	1.4	1.0	90,469	81,724	51.3	46.3	8,745
Source: SCB

=== Värmland ===
Location	Turnout	Share	Votes	S	M	FP	KD	V	C	MP	SD	Other	L-vote	R-vote	Left	Right	Margin
Location	%	%		%	%	%	%	%	%	%	%	%			%	%	
Arvika	76.4	9.1	15,086	44.0	10.3	10.7	7.9	9.4	9.0	5.6	1.7	1.4	8,898	5,723	59.0	37.9	3,175
Eda	74.9	2.6	4,322	49.8	8.8	8.2	8.1	7.0	13.3	2.6	0.9	1.0	2,572	1,665	59.5	38.5	907
Filipstad	76.0	4.0	6,632	53.8	8.2	7.3	5.8	12.3	5.6	3.3	1.4	2.2	4,603	1,786	69.4	26.9	2,817
Forshaga	80.9	4.1	6,775	51.9	9.2	8.7	7.2	8.1	7.5	3.9	2.2	1.3	4,326	2,216	63.9	32.7	2,110
Grums	78.0	3.3	5,497	54.7	8.8	5.8	7.5	8.8	9.6	2.1	0.9	1.8	3,605	1,742	65.6	31.7	1,863
Hagfors	79.6	5.2	8,615	56.9	6.3	5.0	4.9	13.7	9.4	2.0	1.2	0.6	6,259	2,200	72.7	25.5	4,059
Hammarö	83.9	5.2	8,671	46.5	14.2	13.3	7.6	8.2	4.0	3.6	1.3	1.3	5,055	3,393	58.3	39.1	1,662
Karlstad	82.1	31.0	51,272	40.0	15.2	14.2	8.7	8.0	5.7	4.9	1.4	2.0	27,078	22,480	52.8	43.8	4,598
Kil	80.5	4.2	7,001	41.8	13.6	11.4	9.8	7.1	10.0	3.8	1.6	0.9	3,689	3,140	52.7	44.9	549
Kristinehamn	81.3	9.0	14,888	42.1	12.0	12.3	8.3	9.5	8.6	4.3	1.4	1.5	8,322	6,136	55.9	41.2	2,186
Munkfors	80.4	1.6	2,576	59.3	6.1	7.0	4.1	9.6	8.6	3.0	1.8	0.5	1,851	665	71.9	25.8	1,186
Storfors	79.6	1.7	2,752	52.6	9.3	7.7	7.3	10.4	7.3	3.1	1.2	1.2	1,819	867	66.1	31.5	952
Sunne	79.1	5.0	8,189	35.1	14.6	9.4	8.9	5.9	20.3	3.8	1.6	0.5	3,668	4,348	44.8	53.1	680
Säffle	80.8	6.1	10,054	33.8	12.4	10.8	10.9	6.6	19.1	3.6	1.0	1.9	4,420	5,342	44.0	53.1	922
Torsby	76.7	4.8	7,975	43.6	15.7	5.9	5.4	11.6	12.7	2.9	1.2	1.0	4,636	3,168	58.1	39.7	1,468
Årjäng	74.2	3.1	5,108	29.3	9.8	27.0	10.7	5.5	14.3	2.1	0.7	0.6	1,883	3,158	36.9	61.8	1,275
Total	79.8	3.1	165,413	43.4	12.4	11.5	8.1	8.7	9.2	4.0	1.4	1.5	92,684	68,029	56.0	41.1	24,655
Source: SCB

=== Västerbotten ===
Location	Turnout	Share	Votes	S	M	FP	KD	V	C	MP	SD	Other	L-vote	R-vote	Left	Right	Margin
Location	%	%		%	%	%	%	%	%	%	%	%			%	%	
Bjurholm	78.6	1.0	1,613	39.0	14.1	10.5	10.2	4.0	20.0	0.9	0.2	1.0	708	885	43.9	54.9	177
Dorotea	77.4	1.2	1,940	55.1	3.8	9.2	4.6	11.0	12.6	1.8	0.3	1.7	1,315	586	67.8	30.2	729
Lycksele	78.5	5.0	7,694	50.6	5.5	10.9	10.9	9.9	8.4	2.1	0.4	1.4	4,810	2,750	62.5	35.7	2,060
Malå	79.3	1.4	2,199	48.8	6.1	8.5	7.2	17.3	9.0	2.0	0.1	0.9	1,499	679	68.2	30.9	820
Nordmaling	78.6	2.9	4,535	48.3	7.5	9.0	10.1	7.5	14.5	2.3	0.2	0.7	2,633	1,862	58.1	41.1	771
Norsjö	79.7	1.8	2,850	44.1	4.1	6.7	9.0	13.7	19.6	1.7	0.1	1.0	1,695	1,123	59.5	39.4	572
Robertsfors	80.5	2.8	4,336	38.8	5.7	5.4	8.9	8.0	30.4	2.1	0.2	0.5	2,123	2,183	49.0	50.3	60
Skellefteå	81.4	28.9	44,967	50.7	5.0	9.5	8.5	11.5	10.2	3.6	0.4	0.7	29,541	14,924	65.7	33.2	14,617
Sorsele	75.0	1.2	1,794	44.1	5.6	6.4	11.7	9.4	15.3	4.7	0.5	2.3	1,044	699	58.2	39.0	345
Storuman	76.3	2.6	4,025	42.3	8.2	8.0	11.4	10.0	13.7	3.6	0.3	2.4	2,248	1,665	55.9	41.4	583
Umeå	82.1	41.4	64,250	43.9	7.8	11.8	7.5	12.6	8.6	6.5	0.3	1.0	40,470	22,914	63.0	35.7	17,556
Vilhelmina	77.9	3.0	4,589	48.2	3.2	8.7	11.4	10.2	12.7	3.3	0.6	1.7	2,834	1,648	61.8	35.9	1,186
Vindeln	75.7	2.3	3,498	39.5	8.6	9.5	11.3	7.4	19.9	2.3	0.3	1.3	1,720	1,723	49.2	49.3	3
Vännäs	77.9	3.1	4,871	44.8	5.5	6.9	8.9	11.5	18.6	3.2	0.4	0.2	2,896	1,944	59.5	39.9	952
Åsele	80.0	1.4	2,208	52.4	5.2	5.8	6.0	9.1	17.2	1.9	0.4	2.0	1,400	754	63.4	34.1	646
Total	80.7	2.9	155,369	46.5	6.5	10.1	8.5	11.5	11.2	4.5	0.3	1.0	96,936	56,339	62.4	36.3	40,597
Source: SCB

=== Västernorrland ===
Location	Turnout	Share	Votes	S	M	FP	KD	V	C	MP	SD	Other	L-vote	R-vote	Left	Right	Margin
Location	%	%		%	%	%	%	%	%	%	%	%			%	%	
Härnösand	78.4	10.2	15,349	45.6	10.0	10.1	7.4	9.6	10.5	5.7	0.4	0.7	9,343	5,837	60.9	38.0	3,506
Kramfors	79.4	8.6	13,017	51.0	6.8	5.4	5.8	12.6	13.9	3.7	0.4	0.5	8,758	4,149	67.3	31.9	4,609
Sollefteå	78.9	8.7	13,126	53.4	6.8	5.7	7.4	11.5	9.9	4.1	0.7	0.6	9,047	3,907	68.9	29.8	5,140
Sundsvall	79.5	38.0	57,374	46.4	10.9	12.1	6.9	10.0	6.9	4.2	1.4	1.3	34,758	21,083	60.6	36.7	13,675
Timrå	79.5	7.1	10,754	55.0	5.4	8.0	5.9	12.5	8.3	2.3	1.5	1.2	7,508	2,959	69.8	27.5	4,549
Ånge	76.1	4.3	6,484	50.1	7.0	6.2	6.4	12.0	12.6	3.3	1.0	1.4	4,238	2,087	65.4	32.2	2,151
Örnsköldsvik	81.3	23.1	34,862	51.8	6.4	8.0	10.3	7.0	12.0	2.6	0.1	1.7	21,408	12,810	61.4	36.7	8,598
Total	79.5	2.8	150,966	49.3	8.5	9.3	7.6	9.9	9.6	3.8	0.8	1.2	95,060	52,832	63.0	35.0	42,228
Source: SCB

=== Västmanland ===
Location	Turnout	Share	Votes	S	M	FP	KD	V	C	MP	SD	Other	L-vote	R-vote	Left	Right	Margin
Location	%	%		%	%	%	%	%	%	%	%	%			%	%	
Arboga	79.8	5.5	8,169	44.3	11.7	12.3	8.4	8.9	6.9	5.3	1.0	1.3	4,774	3,206	58.4	39.2	1,568
Fagersta	77.8	4.9	7,301	52.6	10.2	8.0	6.0	13.7	3.9	3.6	1.0	1.0	5,096	2,055	69.8	28.1	3,041
Hallstahammar	77.1	5.6	8,345	52.3	8.3	9.8	8.3	10.6	4.3	3.3	1.9	1.1	5,524	2,570	66.2	30.8	2,954
Heby	78.7	5.2	7,833	40.5	9.6	8.4	10.5	8.4	16.9	3.5	1.4	0.8	4,103	3,559	52.4	45.4	544
Kungsör	80.2	3.2	4,820	45.3	12.2	11.7	8.5	8.3	8.9	3.6	0.5	1.1	2,755	1,985	57.2	41.2	770
Köping	77.3	9.4	14,046	48.8	11.0	10.3	6.8	9.9	7.0	3.3	0.9	2.1	8,705	4,926	62.0	35.1	3,779
Norberg	78.8	2.3	3,489	49.6	8.9	8.1	5.0	17.2	5.4	4.2	0.4	1.2	2,476	956	71.0	27.4	1,520
Sala	78.3	8.4	12,600	40.8	11.8	11.3	9.6	7.4	12.8	4.3	1.2	0.8	6,615	5,735	52.4	45.5	880
Skinnskatteberg	77.5	1.8	2,704	53.6	7.8	6.8	5.3	12.9	8.3	3.9	0.6	0.9	1,903	763	70.4	28.2	1,140
Surahammar	77.8	3.8	5,604	57.8	7.2	8.7	5.6	11.5	3.8	3.5	0.9	0.9	4,084	1,417	72.9	25.3	2,667
Västerås	78.7	49.8	74,410	42.4	14.5	16.7	8.2	7.3	3.2	4.9	1.2	1.7	40,632	31,666	54.6	42.6	8,966
Total	78.4	2.8	149,321	45.0	12.4	13.3	8.0	8.7	5.7	4.4	1.1	1.4	86,667	58,838	58.0	39.4	27,829
Source: SCB

=== Västra Götaland ===
==== Gothenburg ====
Location	Turnout	Share	Votes	S	M	FP	KD	V	C	MP	SD	Other	L-vote	R-vote	Left	Right	Margin
Location	%	%		%	%	%	%	%	%	%	%	%			%	%	
Gothenburg	77.5	100.0	273,056	33.2	17.4	18.0	8.6	11.9	1.9	6.5	1.6	1.0	140,609	125,407	51.5	45.9	15,202
Total	77.5	5.1	273,056	33.2	17.4	18.0	8.6	11.9	1.9	6.5	1.6	1.0	140,609	125,407	51.5	45.9	15,202
Source: SCB

==== Västra Götaland E ====
Location	Turnout	Share	Votes	S	M	FP	KD	V	C	MP	SD	Other	L-vote	R-vote	Left	Right	Margin
Location	%	%		%	%	%	%	%	%	%	%	%			%	%	
Essunga	81.9	2.3	3,530	33.0	17.8	8.7	12.3	5.7	18.7	2.7	0.3	0.9	1,459	2,028	41.3	57.5	569
Falköping	80.7	12.2	18,731	37.4	14.3	8.5	14.8	6.9	12.0	4.0	1.5	0.6	9,040	9,298	48.3	49.6	258
Grästorp	80.5	2.3	3,552	33.2	18.3	9.4	12.3	5.2	17.0	2.9	1.2	0.4	1,471	2,024	41.4	57.0	553
Gullspång	79.8	2.3	3,457	42.9	11.6	6.8	10.9	8.1	10.7	3.9	2.7	2.3	1,897	1,385	54.9	40.1	512
Götene	82.5	5.2	7,937	40.5	11.6	9.1	14.0	8.0	10.9	3.9	1.0	1.0	4,161	3,618	52.4	45.6	543
Hjo	81.0	3.5	5,444	37.7	15.0	11.3	15.1	6.9	8.4	3.7	0.9	0.9	2,632	2,710	48.3	49.8	78
Karlsborg	81.9	2.9	4,440	43.5	13.6	9.5	12.4	6.2	10.2	3.2	0.5	0.9	2,347	2,028	52.9	45.7	319
Lidköping	81.7	14.9	22,854	43.4	12.0	10.1	11.3	9.4	8.0	3.7	0.7	1.4	12,924	9,460	56.6	41.4	3,464
Mariestad	79.2	9.2	14,179	43.6	13.1	10.1	11.3	8.8	6.2	4.4	1.7	0.7	8,048	5,786	56.8	40.8	2,262
Skara	80.1	7.2	11,015	42.2	14.8	10.3	10.5	7.8	9.0	4.0	0.8	0.5	5,947	4,921	54.0	44.7	1,026
Skövde	80.6	19.2	29,477	40.9	14.6	12.2	11.7	7.1	7.5	3.9	1.0	1.0	15,310	13,556	51.9	46.0	1,754
Tibro	80.1	4.1	6,338	42.5	11.9	10.7	14.3	7.2	8.1	3.5	0.8	1.0	3,373	2,853	53.2	45.0	520
Tidaholm	81.9	5.0	7,716	49.2	10.0	8.4	11.4	8.4	8.3	3.2	0.8	0.4	4,689	2,939	60.8	38.1	1,750
Töreboda	76.1	3.5	5,322	39.3	13.7	7.3	10.9	7.4	14.6	3.7	2.3	0.9	2,678	2,475	50.3	46.5	203
Vara	78.6	6.2	9,492	33.3	19.6	8.9	12.5	5.6	16.2	2.7	1.0	0.3	3,942	5,423	41.5	57.1	1,481
Total	80.5	2.9	153,484	40.8	13.9	10.0	12.3	7.6	9.8	3.7	1.1	0.9	79,918	70,504	52.1	45.9	9,414
Source: SCB

==== Västra Götaland N ====
Location	Turnout	Share	Votes	S	M	FP	KD	V	C	MP	SD	Other	L-vote	R-vote	Left	Right	Margin
Location	%	%		%	%	%	%	%	%	%	%	%			%	%	
Ale	80.9	9.4	14,658	43.9	11.1	12.1	10.2	10.3	5.4	4.1	2.1	0.9	8,542	5,686	58.3	38.8	2,856
Alingsås	83.0	13.9	21,670	34.4	13.1	15.3	15.8	9.2	5.5	5.6	0.5	0.6	10,655	10,782	49.2	49.8	127
Bengtsfors	77.4	4.0	6,197	46.2	8.9	9.0	10.5	6.9	14.1	3.0	0.2	1.1	3,479	2,635	56.1	42.5	844
Dals-Ed	74.5	1.7	2,700	37.9	10.8	6.4	17.2	4.3	17.9	3.7	0.3	1.6	1,237	1,413	45.8	52.3	176
Färgelanda	79.0	2.6	4,072	39.8	9.2	10.8	10.0	6.1	19.5	2.0	1.6	0.9	1,949	2,019	47.9	49.6	70
Herrljunga	82.7	3.7	5,781	32.7	12.1	9.8	17.1	6.6	16.0	3.5	1.2	1.0	2,475	3,178	42.8	55.0	703
Lerum	84.8	13.6	21,184	32.9	17.3	18.1	12.1	8.5	3.4	5.0	1.7	0.9	9,839	10,787	46.4	50.9	948
Lilla Edet	77.7	4.6	7,141	45.6	10.2	9.7	8.0	9.8	8.5	4.7	2.7	0.8	4,290	2,603	60.1	36.5	1,687
Mellerud	77.8	3.6	5,656	35.7	12.7	9.6	13.4	6.3	15.3	3.1	1.9	2.0	2,552	2,882	45.1	51.0	330
Trollhättan	80.1	19.8	30,791	49.9	11.5	11.3	7.7	8.8	4.5	3.9	2.1	0.3	19,301	10,746	62.7	34.9	8,555
Vårgårda	82.0	4.0	6,295	31.3	10.6	10.0	23.4	6.3	12.3	4.2	0.6	1.3	2,632	3,546	41.8	56.3	914
Vänersborg	80.4	14.2	22,123	44.0	11.2	11.3	10.3	9.6	7.5	4.3	0.9	0.9	12,815	8,895	57.9	40.2	3,920
Åmål	77.4	4.8	7,400	46.7	9.7	9.4	10.1	6.9	11.4	4.0	0.7	1.0	4,269	3,006	57.7	40.6	1,263
Total	80.8	2.9	155,668	41.1	12.1	12.3	11.7	8.5	7.7	4.3	1.4	0.8	84,035	68,178	54.0	43.8	15,857
Source: SCB

==== Västra Götaland S ====
Location	Turnout	Share	Votes	S	M	FP	KD	V	C	MP	SD	Other	L-vote	R-vote	Left	Right	Margin
Location	%	%		%	%	%	%	%	%	%	%	%			%	%	
Bollebygd	84.4	4.4	4,785	37.3	16.6	10.9	13.9	7.0	7.8	4.5	1.5	0.5	2,333	2,356	48.8	49.2	23
Borås	80.8	53.1	58,125	42.2	15.2	11.6	11.7	8.2	4.3	3.8	1.5	1.6	31,480	24,864	54.2	42.8	6,616
Mark	81.3	17.9	19,559	42.8	11.1	9.5	12.1	8.1	10.5	4.1	1.0	0.9	10,748	8,435	55.0	43.1	2,313
Svenljunga	78.6	5.5	6,045	38.2	13.7	10.4	12.7	4.8	15.2	3.3	0.9	0.8	2,802	3,140	46.4	51.9	338
Tranemo	83.0	6.6	7,200	42.1	12.3	8.9	11.8	5.0	15.4	3.3	0.9	0.3	3,628	3,484	50.4	48.4	144
Ulricehamn	82.1	12.6	13,755	35.1	12.6	11.3	15.4	6.3	13.3	4.0	0.5	1.6	6,243	7,226	45.4	52.5	983
Total	81.2	2.1	109,469	40.9	13.9	10.9	12.4	7.5	8.0	3.9	1.2	1.3	57,234	49,505	52.3	45.2	7,729
Source: SCB

==== Västra Götaland W ====
Location	Turnout	Share	Votes	S	M	FP	KD	V	C	MP	SD	Other	L-vote	R-vote	Left	Right	Margin
Location	%	%		%	%	%	%	%	%	%	%	%			%	%	
Härryda	83.0	9.0	17,697	34.2	17.2	18.9	9.6	7.7	3.9	5.1	1.5	1.7	8,331	8,788	47.1	49.7	457
Kungälv	84.1	11.9	23,337	38.4	15.1	14.9	12.1	7.5	6.0	4.0	1.2	0.7	11,668	11,231	50.0	48.1	437
Lysekil	80.9	4.7	9,133	48.9	11.4	15.4	7.0	7.6	3.7	4.4	1.2	0.4	5,561	3,424	60.9	37.5	2,137
Munkedal	76.8	3.1	6,000	40.4	10.7	9.0	12.1	7.0	14.1	3.3	2.2	1.3	3,037	2,755	50.6	45.9	282
Mölndal	82.5	17.4	34,161	35.1	15.9	19.0	9.7	8.9	3.0	4.3	2.0	2.1	16,510	16,249	48.3	47.6	261
Orust	80.0	4.6	9,068	35.6	14.6	14.6	11.3	8.1	9.3	4.6	1.3	0.5	4,381	4,522	48.3	49.9	141
Partille	82.9	9.9	19,385	34.6	16.4	19.3	11.3	9.0	1.9	4.5	1.4	1.6	9,325	9,468	48.1	48.8	143
Sotenäs	79.2	3.0	5,877	39.2	19.1	15.0	10.7	5.9	4.6	3.4	1.0	1.2	2,845	2,907	48.4	49.5	62
Stenungsund	81.1	6.4	12,601	37.3	16.0	16.5	11.3	6.8	5.1	4.2	1.3	1.6	6,088	6,156	48.3	48.9	68
Strömstad	72.0	2.9	5,686	38.5	13.9	12.8	7.6	6.8	13.8	5.3	0.6	0.7	2,877	2,740	50.6	48.2	137
Tanum	76.8	3.6	6,980	29.3	14.5	14.2	10.5	5.9	18.6	5.0	0.6	1.5	2,801	4,037	40.1	57.9	1,236
Tjörn	83.0	4.7	9,183	28.7	16.1	17.6	22.0	5.4	3.8	3.7	1.9	0.8	3,478	5,460	37.9	59.5	1,982
Uddevalla	79.4	14.9	29,226	43.3	11.8	12.5	10.7	9.1	5.3	4.1	2.4	0.7	16,532	11,788	56.6	40.3	4,744
Öckerö	84.9	3.8	7,482	27.7	18.8	13.4	27.3	6.2	1.8	3.7	0.6	0.4	2,814	4,589	37.6	61.3	1,775
Total	81.2	3.7	195,816	37.0	15.0	16.0	11.7	7.9	5.4	4.3	1.6	1.2	96,248	94,114	49.2	48.1	2,134
Source: SCB

=== Örebro ===
Location	Turnout	Share	Votes	S	M	FP	KD	V	C	MP	SD	Other	L-vote	R-vote	Left	Right	Margin
Location	%	%		%	%	%	%	%	%	%	%	%			%	%	
Askersund	81.0	4.3	7,186	45.5	11.1	8.8	9.4	8.6	10.6	3.2	2.1	0.8	4,115	2,863	57.3	39.8	1,252
Degerfors	82.3	3.9	6,491	60.8	5.1	6.0	5.2	13.3	5.3	2.5	0.9	0.7	4,977	1,406	76.7	21.7	3,571
Hallsberg	82.3	5.8	9,635	50.8	8.4	8.6	8.7	8.3	8.4	3.4	2.3	0.9	6,027	3,293	62.6	34.2	2,734
Hällefors	75.7	2.7	4,478	62.6	6.9	6.2	4.3	9.8	6.2	3.0	0.7	0.3	3,375	1,056	75.4	23.6	2,319
Karlskoga	79.6	11.2	18,738	54.6	11.3	9.6	6.6	8.9	2.8	2.9	1.2	2.0	12,444	5,697	66.4	30.4	6,747
Kumla	82.4	6.9	11,573	48.5	10.2	9.3	10.4	7.9	7.2	3.1	2.2	1.1	6,887	4,305	59.5	37.2	2,582
Laxå	80.7	2.4	3,944	50.7	6.8	8.9	10.0	9.7	7.3	2.4	2.4	1.7	2,479	1,301	62.9	33.0	1,178
Lekeberg	81.8	2.6	4,347	36.6	11.2	8.9	11.8	6.5	18.1	3.7	2.4	0.8	2,033	2,174	46.8	50.0	141
Lindesberg	79.3	8.4	13,989	47.5	10.1	8.4	7.6	7.7	12.0	4.0	1.6	1.0	8,294	5,333	59.3	38.1	2,961
Ljusnarsberg	74.4	1.9	3,172	51.8	7.2	6.0	6.2	12.3	10.8	3.4	1.7	0.7	2,141	955	67.5	30.1	1,186
Nora	79.2	3.8	6,273	45.3	11.0	11.4	8.9	9.1	7.8	4.1	1.4	1.0	3,670	2,454	58.5	39.1	1,216
Örebro	82.5	46.1	76,771	41.8	12.1	14.2	10.2	9.0	4.6	5.2	1.8	1.3	42,921	31,533	55.9	41.1	11,388
Total	81.2	3.1	166,597	46.5	10.7	11.2	9.0	8.9	6.4	4.2	1.7	1.2	99,363	62,370	59.6	37.4	36,993
Source: SCB

=== Östergötland ===
Location	Turnout	Share	Votes	S	M	FP	KD	V	C	MP	SD	Other	L-vote	R-vote	Left	Right	Margin
Location	%	%		%	%	%	%	%	%	%	%	%			%	%	
Boxholm	83.0	1.3	3,300	53.4	7.4	5.9	9.8	7.5	11.4	3.2	0.6	0.8	2,117	1,138	64.2	34.5	979
Finspång	83.0	5.3	13,253	51.6	9.7	8.3	9.6	9.5	5.7	4.0	0.6	0.9	8,637	4,417	65.2	33.3	4,220
Kinda	81.0	2.4	6,105	38.5	11.1	8.1	14.4	5.8	16.3	4.2	1.0	0.5	2,962	3,050	48.5	50.0	88
Linköping	82.9	33.5	84,043	38.2	16.0	15.1	10.7	7.0	5.1	5.4	0.7	1.9	42,498	39,354	50.6	46.8	3,144
Mjölby	80.9	6.1	15,351	46.4	12.7	9.9	10.1	7.2	8.0	3.4	0.3	2.1	8,744	6,237	57.0	40.6	2,507
Motala	79.9	10.0	24,994	49.4	10.8	10.2	9.0	7.6	5.1	4.1	0.4	3.4	15,254	8,776	61.0	35.1	6,478
Norrköping	78.9	28.7	72,054	42.3	16.7	11.6	9.1	7.8	3.8	5.1	1.4	2.2	39,786	29,692	55.2	41.2	10,094
Söderköping	82.2	3.4	8,514	35.3	19.0	10.3	11.5	5.8	10.4	5.4	1.3	1.1	3,955	4,357	46.5	51.2	402
Vadstena	82.1	1.9	4,826	40.7	16.7	10.2	12.0	5.3	6.8	4.8	0.6	2.8	2,450	2,208	50.8	45.8	242
Valdemarsvik	80.7	2.0	5,123	43.4	13.9	7.7	9.1	5.8	15.5	3.4	0.4	0.8	2,696	2,366	52.6	46.2	330
Ydre	84.7	1.0	2,563	33.0	10.4	8.3	21.4	4.3	16.9	4.8	0.0	0.8	1,079	1,462	42.1	57.0	383
Åtvidaberg	83.3	2.9	7,389	49.0	11.0	7.7	10.1	6.7	9.7	3.7	0.7	1.4	4,391	2,842	59.4	38.5	1,549
Ödeshög	80.7	1.4	3,411	38.1	12.2	5.9	18.4	5.5	14.0	4.6	0.3	1.1	1,642	1,720	48.1	50.4	78
Total	81.1	4.7	250,926	42.2	14.7	11.8	10.3	7.3	6.1	4.8	0.9	2.0	136,211	107,619	54.3	42.9	28,592
Source: SCB
