= Nykvarn =

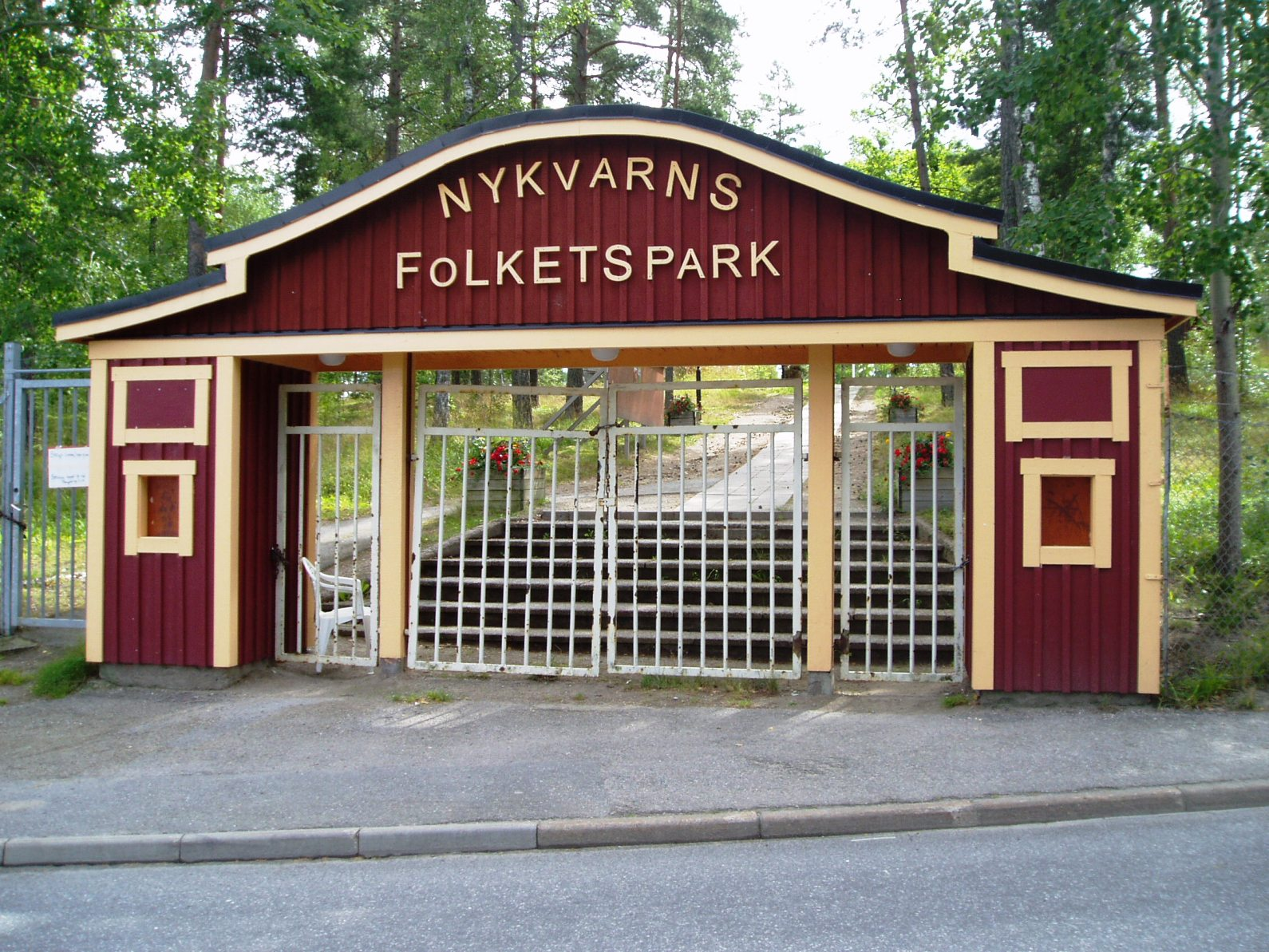
- Nykvarn Folkpark, entrance

- Location within Stockholm Location within Sweden
- Coordinates: 59°10′30″N 17°26′00″E
- Country: Sweden
- Province: Södermanland
- County: Stockholm County
- Municipality: Nykvarn Municipality

Area
  - Total: 5.60 km^{2} (2.16 sq mi)

Population (31 December 2020)
  - Total: 7,862
  - Density: 1,400/km^{2} (3,640/sq mi)
- Time zone: UTC+1 (CET)
  - Summer (DST): UTC+2 (CEST)

Nykvarn (Swedish pronunciation: [nʏˈkvɑːɳ]) is a locality and (since 1999) the seat of Nykvarn Municipality, Stockholm County, Sweden with 7,560 inhabitants in 2017. Between 1971-1998 it was a part of Södertälje Municipality. Nykvarn is the hometown of such bands as Hyena Breed, Feed Filiph, From Zero to Hero and Aldiureep, as well as Stanley Cup winner Carl Hagelin. The city hosts the annual rock and metal festival called Moshpit Open Festival.

== Notable people ==
- Margó Ingvardsson, Member of the Riksdag
- Noah Östlund, professional ice hockey player for the Buffalo Sabres
