= Nykvarn Municipality =

Nykvarn Municipality Nykvarns kommun
- Municipality
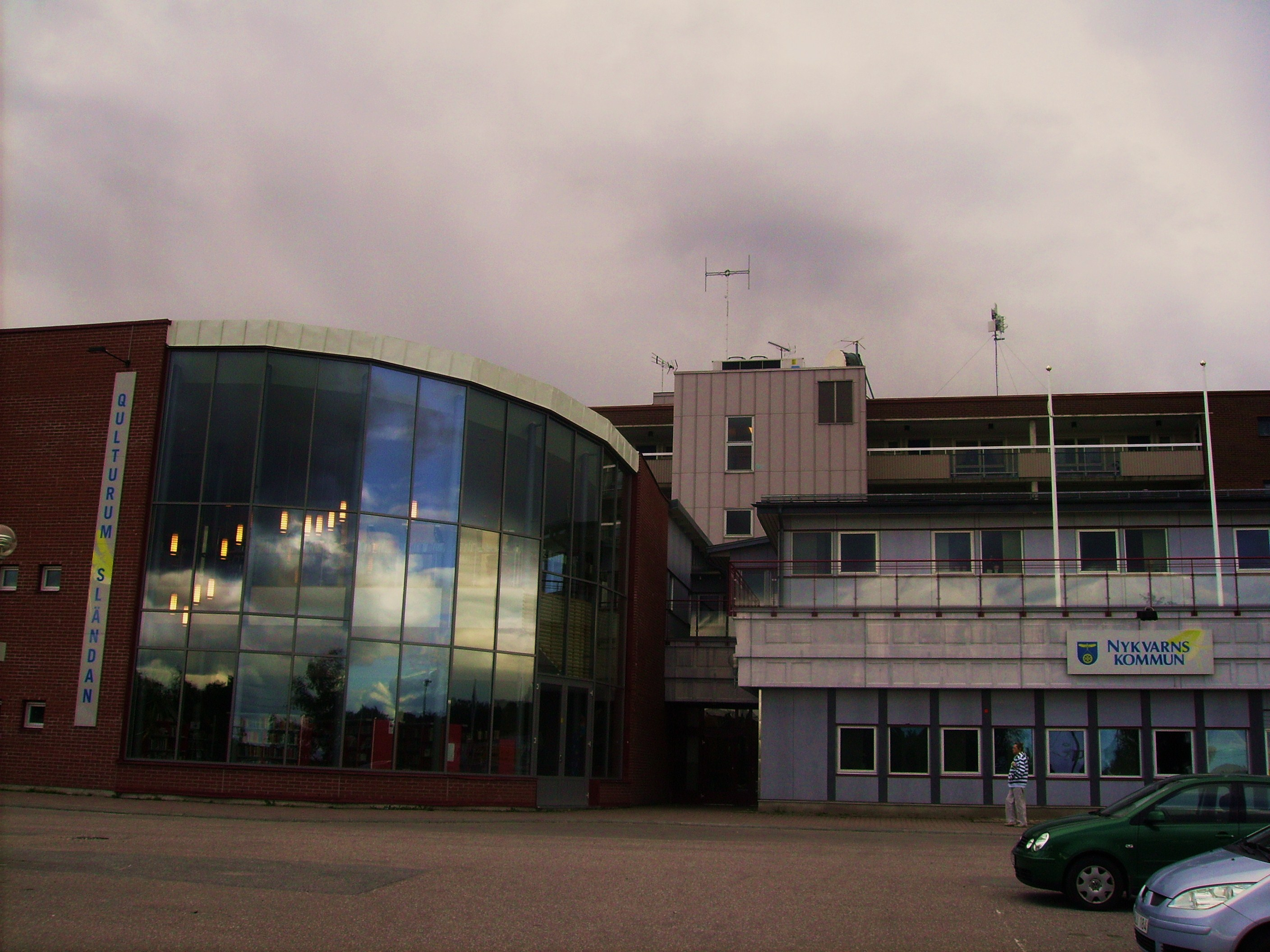
- Nykvarn City Hall

- Coat of arms

- Coordinates: 59°10′N 17°26′E
- Country: Sweden
- County: Stockholm County
- Seat: Nykvarn

Area
  - Total: 176.99 km^{2} (68.34 sq mi)
  - Land: 152.76 km^{2} (58.98 sq mi)
  - Water: 24.23 km^{2} (9.36 sq mi)
- Area as of 1 January 2014.

Population (30 June 2025)
  - Total: 12,378
  - Density: 81.029/km^{2} (209.86/sq mi)
- Time zone: UTC+1 (CET)
  - Summer (DST): UTC+2 (CEST)
- ISO 3166 code: SE
- Province: Södermanland
- Municipal code: 0140
- Website: www.nykvarn.se
- Density is calculated using land area only.

Nykvarn Municipality (Swedish: Nykvarns kommun) is a municipality in Stockholm County in east central Sweden. Its seat is located in the town of Nykvarn.

Nykvarn is a young municipality, and is the result of the splitting of Södertälje Municipality in 1999. Nykvarn can be regarded as a totally new municipality, because there was never before an entity with that territory or that name.

The municipality has a significant population increase in the summer thanks to tourism.

Nykvarn is located between the two cities Södertälje and Strängnäs, and many citizens of Nykvarn work in either.

Archeological finds show the area to have been inhabited for about 5,000 years, similar to its neighbouring municipalities around Lake Mälaren.

Besides graves from the Stone Age, there is also an interesting runestone that can be visited that is listed in the Rundata catalog as Sö 338. It currently resides in the Turinge church, a church that has a history dating back to around the year 1100. This runestone has a very long inscription.

A newer sight is the Taxinge-Näsby Castle, which was begun sometime in or before the 14th century, by Bo Jonsson Grip. The castle has its current facade in the empire style from 1813. Many celebrities have during the centuries visited or stayed at the castle, including Carl Michael Bellman in the 18th century and August Strindberg in the 19th century.

== Demography ==
=== 2022 population by district ===
This is a demographic table based on Nykvarn Municipality's electoral districts in the 2022 Swedish general election sourced from SVT's election platform, in turn taken from SCB official statistics.

In total there were 11,486 residents, including 8,271 Swedish citizens of voting age resident in the municipality. 35.3% voted for the left coalition and 64.0% for the right coalition. Indicators are in percentage points except population totals and income.

Location	Residents	Citizen adults	Left vote	Right vote	Employed	Swedish parents	Foreign heritage	Income SEK	Degree
Location			%	%					
Gammeltorp-Hökmossen	1,677	1,146	38.2	61.6	87	81	19	32,233	41
Lillhaga-Sandtorp	2,058	1,504	37.0	62.6	90	84	16	34,294	44
Nykvarns C	1,561	1,140	39.4	59.4	79	73	27	25,017	26
Stensborg-Brokvarn	2,354	1,712	33.2	66.1	91	83	17	33,576	41
Taxinge	1,774	1,252	31.3	67.5	89	82	18	31,647	33
Turinge	2,062	1,517	35.5	64.0	88	81	19	32,165	42
Source: SVT

=== Population development ===
Population development in Nykvarn Municipality 2000–2019
Year	Population
2000	8,052
2005	8,354
2010	9,331
2015	10,192
2017	10,660
2019	11,014
Source: SCB - Folkmängd efter region och år.

=== Residents with a foreign background ===
On 31 December 2017 the number of people with a foreign background (persons born outside of Sweden or with two parents born outside of Sweden) was 1 821, or 17.08% of the population (10 660 on 31 December 2017). On 31 December 2002 the number of residents with a foreign background was (per the same definition) 1 243, or 15.15% of the population (8 204 on 31 December 2002). On 31 December 2017 there were 10 660 residents in Nykvarn, of which 1 290 people (12.10%) were born in a country other than Sweden. Divided by country in the table below - the Nordic countries as well as the 12 most common countries of birth outside of Sweden for Swedish residents have been included, with other countries of birth bundled together by continent by Statistics Sweden.

Country of birth
31 December 2017
1	Sweden	9,370
2	Finland	456
3	European Union: Other countries	186
4	Asia: Other countries	83
5	Syria	71
6	Iraq	66
7	Poland	86
8	South America	46
9	Africa: Other countries	44
10	Norway	34
11	Thailand	34
12	Germany	30
13	Europe outside of the EU: other countries	29
14	Somalia	19
15	Yugoslavia/Yugoslavia; SFR Yugoslavia/Serbia and Montenegro	19
16	Afghanistan	17
17	North America	15
18	Denmark	12
19	Eritrea	12
20	Iran	12
21	Turkey	9
22	Bosnia and Herzegovina	4
23	Soviet Union	3
24	Iceland	2
25	Oceania	1

== Elections ==
=== Riksdag ===
These are the results of the Riksdag elections of Nykvarn Municipality since the founding of the modern municipality from the 1998 election. The results of the Sweden Democrats were not published by SCB between 1988 and 1998 at a municipal level to the party's small nationwide size at the time. "Votes" denotes valid votes, whereas "Turnout" denotes also blank and invalid votes.

Year	Turnout	Votes	V	S	MP	C	L	KD	M	SD
1998	83.8	4,370	7.9	42.4	4.0	4.2	5.4	8.4	26.1	0.0
2002	83.0	4,570	5.1	42.9	4.2	4.8	14.0	8.1	17.5	1.3
2006	84.8	4,905	2.8	32.6	4.1	7.1	7.2	5.8	34.6	2.9
2010	87.7	5,648	2.5	23.9	6.1	5.1	6.9	5.0	41.7	7.3
2014	89.4	6,106	2.5	26.3	5.6	5.8	4.5	3.8	31.5	18.0
2018	90.7	6,847	3.5	22.4	3.0	7.6	4.6	6.1	27.2	24.6

Blocs

This lists the relative strength of the socialist and centre-right blocs since 1973, but parties not elected to the Riksdag are inserted as "other", including the Sweden Democrats results from 1988 to 2006, but also the Christian Democrats pre-1991 and the Greens in 1982, 1985 and 1991. The sources are identical to the table above. The coalition or government mandate marked in bold formed the government after the election. New Democracy got elected in 1991 but are still listed as "other" due to the short lifespan of the party. "Elected" is the total number of percentage points from the municipality that went to parties who were elected to the Riksdag.

Year	Turnout	Votes	Left	Right	SD	Other	Elected
1998	83.8	4,370	**54.3**	44.1	0.0	1.6	98.4
2002	83.0	4,570	**52.2**	44.4	0.0	3.4	96.6
2006	84.8	4,905	39.5	**54.7**	0.0	5.8	94.2
2010	87.7	5,648	32.5	**58.7**	7.3	1.5	98.5
2014	89.4	6,106	34.4	**45.6**	18.0	2.0	98.0
