= Åsbo =

Åsbo can refer to:

- Åsbo Northern Hundred, a hundred in Scania
- Åsbo Southern Hundred, a hundred in Scania

Similar spelling:

- Anti-social behaviour order, with its abbreviation ASBO
