= Eva Wigström =

Swedish folklorist and poet

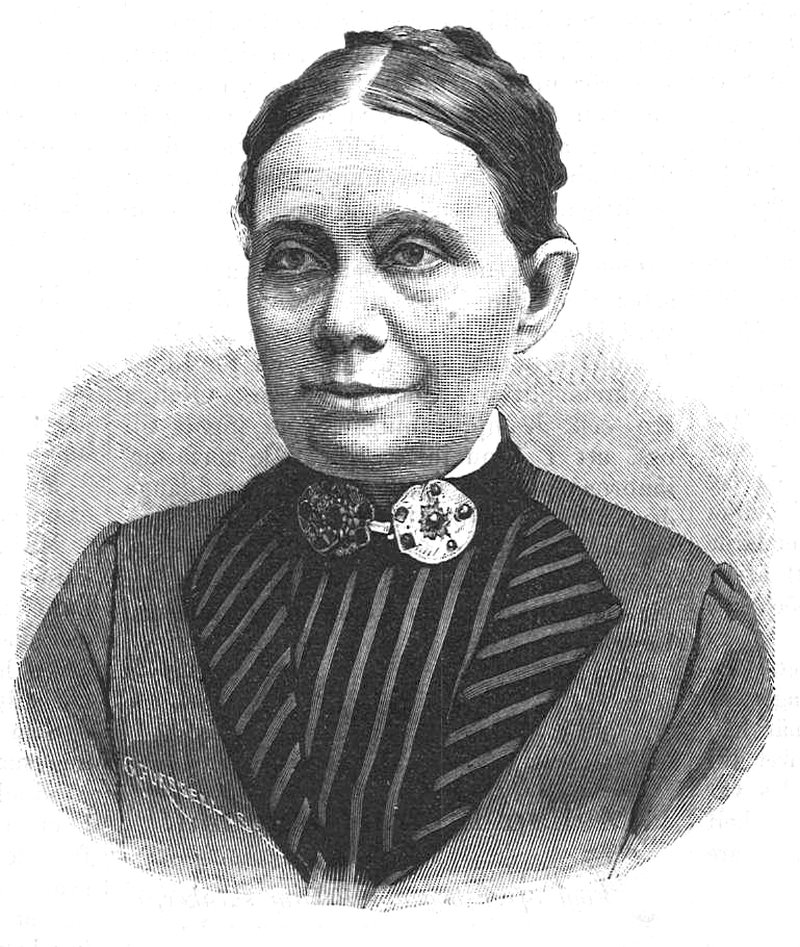
Eva Wigström (1889)

Eva Wigström née Pålsdotter, pen name Ave, (1832–1901) was a Swedish writer and folklorist. A pioneering collector of Sweden's local folklore, she travelled around the countryside, first in Scania and later in Blekinge, documenting folk beliefs, sayings and tales. First published in Denmark, her work was later translated into Swedish. In addition to publishing the folktales she reworked, Wigström wrote poetry and contributed articles to a number of journals.

== Early life and family ==
Born on 24 December 1832 in Asmundtorp near Landskrona in southwest Sweden, Eva Pålsdotter was the daughter of the well-to-do farmer Pål Nilsson and his wife Pernilla née Jönsdotter. She was one of the family's nine children. As her father found girls' schools useless, she was home-educated by an elder brother. When she was 23, she married Claes (Klas August), manager of the Ramlösa mineral water springs on property belonging to her father. The couple had two children, Herta Aurora and Gerda Julia.

== Career ==
It was not until 1879, when she was 47, that Wigström began collecting folklore. Initially she visited communities near her home, including Rönneberga, Norra Åsbo, Södra Åsbo and Luggude but eventually extended her investigations to almost everywhere in Scania and Blekinge. Thanks to her background she was able to talk with ease to women in rural communities and through her marriage had also developed skills to deal with men and women from the middle classes. She soon found that women were more comfortable about revealing their background if her husband was not present. As a result, she undertook most of her visits alone. The material Wigström collected extended to folk beliefs, sayings, stories and anecdotes. She did not, however, take an interest in ballads, possibly because she had not learnt musical notation.

Wigström's first attempts at having her work published in Sweden were unsuccessful. She therefore turned to Denmark where she had received training in folklore collection at the folk high school Askov Højskole, in particular from the ethnographer Svend Grundtvig. It was with his assistance that her first book Folkminnen 1 was published. Accounts of her travels were first published in the Danish journal Höjskolebladet before appearing in Swedish.

In addition to her work as a folklorist, Wigstöm published poetry from 1866, initially in the children's magazine Linnea, tidning för barn. She went on to publish almost a hundred poems and prose items, contributing to children's journals including Lekkamraten, Småskolevännen and Folkskolans barntidning. Her contributions for adults on education and women's rights were published in Allehanda för folket, Framåt, and Dagny. Her portrayals of folk life were published in 1899 in Från herresäten och bondgårdar, sägner och berättelser (From mansions and farm houses, legends and stories, 1899) and in 1891 in Allmogeseder i Rönnebärgs härad på 1840-talet (Rural folk customs in the Rönnebärg district in the 1840s).

The family later settled in Helsingborg where Claes ran a book-keeping school. One of their daughters founded a private girls' school there where from 1877 to 1890 Wigström worked as a teacher, continuing to collect folklore during the holidays. Eva Wigström died on 5 January 1901 in Helsingborg.
