= Perstorp =

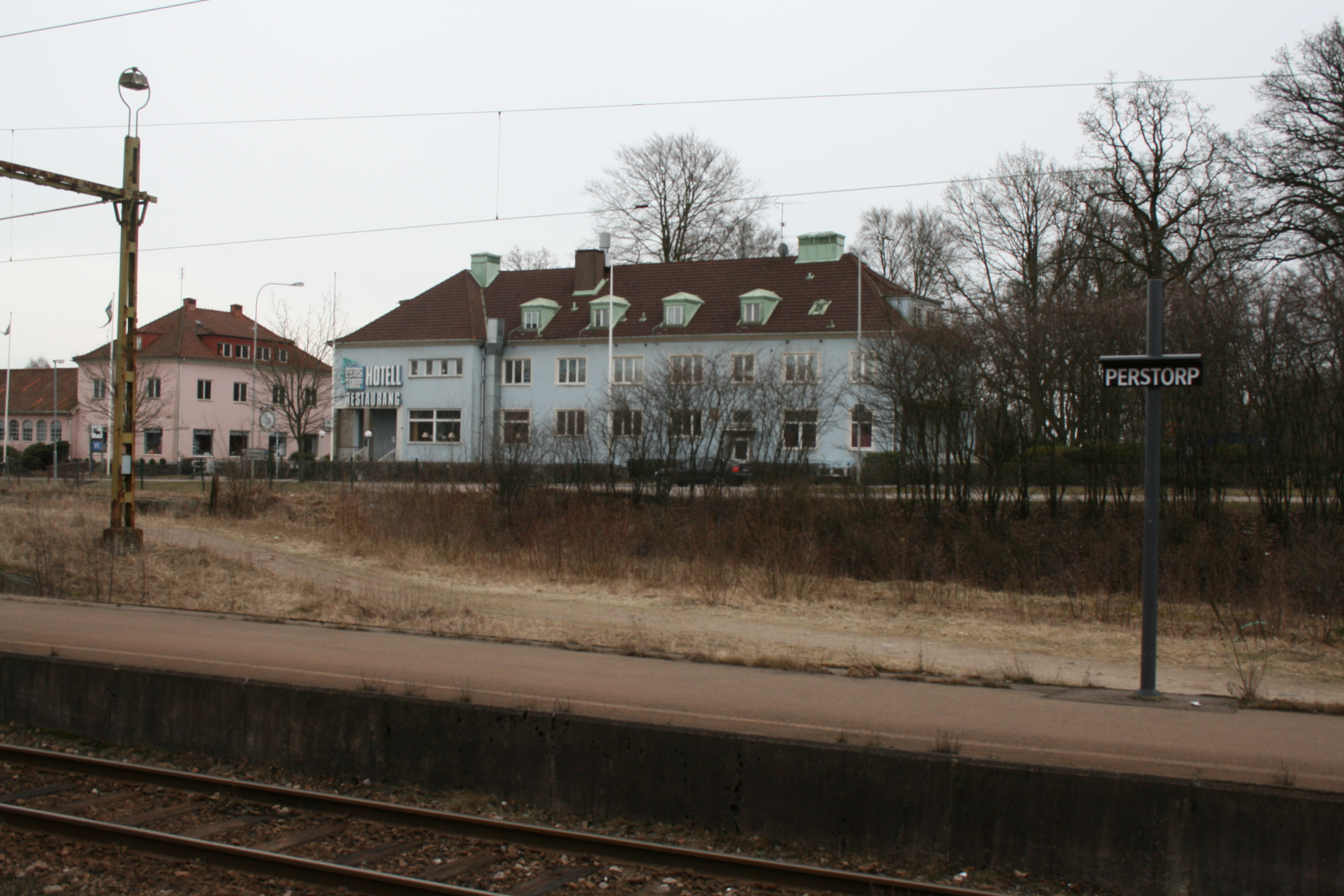
- Perstorp train station

- Coat of arms

- Location within Skåne Location within Sweden
- Coordinates: 56°08′N 13°23′E
- Country: Sweden
- Province: Skåne
- County: Skåne County
- Municipality: Perstorp Municipality

Area
  - Total: 5.43 km^{2} (2.10 sq mi)

Population (31 December 2014)
  - Total: 7,150
  - Density: 1,043/km^{2} (2,700/sq mi)
- Time zone: UTC+1 (CET)
  - Summer (DST): UTC+2 (CEST)

Perstorp is a locality and the seat of Perstorp Municipality in Skåne County, Sweden with 6,054 inhabitants (2018).

== History ==
=== 19th Century ===
==== Modernization of Sweden: 1860–1910 ====
Prior to the municipal reforms of 1862, Perstorp was, just as all local governments, based on a church parish and was integrated with the church. Following the municipal reforms, it became a part of the rural municipality of Perstorp. On 23 May 1935, the municipal community of Perstorp was established.

=== 20th Century ===
==== Post-war Sweden ====
In 1947, the rural municipality and the municipal community merged into the Perstorps Köping. With the 1971 municipal reforms, it became a part of one of the 290 Swedish municipalities, the Municipality of Perstorp.

Until 1971, the village was part of the Norra Åsbo district court. From 1971 to 2001 it was part of the district court of Klippan, since 2001 it has been part of the district court of Helsingborg.

== Demography ==
According to a 2015 statistic, there was a total population of 5 847 people, distributed over 576 hectares (5.76 km^{2}) within the Perstorp municipality. This amounts to ca. 10,15 people per hectare, or about 1000 people per square kilometre.

== Sports ==
Perstorp is home to Perstorp Bälinge Sports Club (PBIK, Perstorp Bälinge Idrottsklubb), which was formed by a merger in 2012 of Perstorp Sports Club and Bälinge Boll och Idrottsklubb.

Notable athletes from the locality include former footballer Björn Andersson and volleyball player Isabelle Haak.

== Twin towns ==
It is twinned with Newton Aycliffe, a town in the North-East of England.
