= Results of the 1998 Swedish general election =

Sweden held a general election on 20 September 1998. Although the Social Democrats hung onto being the largest party and being the largest parliamentary bloc, the party had its worst election result in the unicameral Riksdag era at 36.4%. Both the Left Party and the Christian Democrats had record high results instead, while the Centre Party and People's Party had record low vote shares.

== National results ==
There were 5,261,109 valid ballots cast, a sizeable decrease in turnout from the 1994 election, with turnout dropping from 86.8% to 81.4%.

Party	Votes	%	Seats			
Party	Votes	%	Con.	Lev.	Tot.	+/–
Swedish Social Democratic Party	1,914,426	36.40	130	1	131	–30
Moderate Party	1,204,926	22.91	77	5	82	+2
Left Party	631,011	12.00	43	0	43	+21
Christian Democrats	618,033	11.75	38	4	42	+27
Centre Party	269,762	5.13	10	8	18	–9
Liberal People's Party	248,076	4.72	7	10	17	–9
Green Party	236,699	4.50	5	11	16	–2
Swedish Senior Citizen Interest Party	52,869	1.01	0	0	0	0
The New Party	25,276	0.48	0	0	0	0
Sweden Democrats	19,624	0.37	0	0	0	0
New Future	9,171	0.17	0	0	0	0
New Democracy	8,297	0.16	0	0	0	0
Senior Citizen Party	6,865	0.13	0	0	0	0
Socialist Justice Party	3,044	0.06	0	0	0	0
Communist Party	1,868	0.04	0	0	0	0
Unity	1,725	0.03	0	0	0	0
Socialist Party	1,466	0.03	0	0	0	0
Other parties	6,971	0.13	0	0	0	0
Total	5,260,109	100.00	310	39	349	0
Valid votes	5,260,109	97.89				
Invalid/blank votes	113,466	2.11				
Total votes	5,373,575	100.00				
Registered voters/turnout	6,603,129	81.38				
Source: Statistical Central Bureau

== Regional results ==
=== Percentage share ===
Constituency	Turnout	Share	Votes	S	M	V	KD	C	FP	MP	Other	Left	Right	Margin
Constituency	%	%		%	%	%	%	%	%	%	%	%	%	
Götaland	81.4	48.1	2,527,676	35.6	22.8	10.6	13.5	5.7	4.3	4.3	3.2	50.5	46.3	108,302
Svealand	81.4	38.1	2,005,272	34.5	26.6	11.9	10.6	3.8	5.6	4.8	2.2	51.2	46.6	91,777
Norrland	81.1	13.8	727,161	44.2	12.9	17.1	9.1	6.8	3.7	4.5	1.7	65.8	32.6	241,260
Total	81.4	100.0	5,260,109	36.4	22.9	12.0	11.7	5.1	4.7	4.5	2.6	52.9	44.5	441,339
Source: SCB

=== By votes ===
Constituency	Turnout	Share	Votes	S	M	V	KD	C	FP	MP	Other	Left	Right	Margin
Constituency	%	%												
Götaland	81.4	48.1	2,527,676	901,021	576,836	268,929	340,268	143,662	108,480	107,598	80,882	1,277,548	1,169,246	108,302
Svealand	81.4	38.1	2,005,272	692,171	534,186	237,893	211,658	76,441	112,354	96,352	44,217	1,026,416	934,639	91,777
Norrland	81.1	13.8	727,161	321,234	93,904	124,189	66,107	49,659	27,242	32,749	12,077	478,172	236,912	241,260
Total	81.4	100.0	5,260,109	1,914,426	1,204,926	631,011	618,033	269,762	248,076	236,699	137,176	2,782,136	2,340,797	441,339
Source: SCB

== Results by statistical area ==
The modern national areas of Sweden were introduced in 2008, but the charts below include the counties that are part of those.

=== Percentage share ===
Constituency	Share	Votes	S	M	V	KD	C	FP	MP	Other	Left	Right	Margin
Constituency	%		%	%	%	%	%	%	%	%	%	%	
East Middle Sweden	16.9	889,306	39.3	20.5	11.9	11.5	5.1	4.6	4.8	2.2	56.0	41.8	125,810
Middle Norrland	4.5	238,917	43.8	13.7	14.9	9.3	8.5	3.3	4.6	1.8	63.3	34.8	68,069
North Middle Sweden	9.7	509,624	41.0	16.4	15.2	10.6	6.6	3.6	4.7	1.9	60.9	37.2	120,345
Småland & Islands	9.3	488,305	36.4	18.8	10.2	17.1	8.7	3.0	4.0	1.8	50.5	47.7	13,986
South Sweden	14.2	746,848	37.9	26.7	8.8	10.3	4.2	4.3	3.7	4.2	50.3	45.5	36,407
Stockholm County	19.5	1,026,227	29.2	33.8	10.8	10.2	2.2	6.6	4.9	2.4	44.9	52.7	80,905
Upper Norrland	6.0	318,116	45.3	11.8	19.0	8.6	5.5	4.2	4.1	1.6	68.4	30.0	122,063
West Sweden	19.8	1,042,766	33.3	22.1	12.1	14.1	5.5	5.0	4.7	3.2	50.1	46.7	35,564
Total	100.0	5,260,109	36.4	22.9	12.0	11.7	5.1	4.7	4.5	2.6	52.9	44.5	441,339
Source: SCB

=== By votes ===
Constituency	Share	Votes	S	M	V	KD	C	FP	MP	Other	Left	Right	Margin
Constituency	%												
East Middle Sweden	16.9	889,306	349,253	182,722	105,627	102,605	45,375	41,145	42,777	19,802	497,657	371,847	125,810
Middle Norrland	4.5	238,917	104,693	32,772	35,622	22,260	20,298	7,923	11,007	4,342	151,322	83,253	68,069
North Middle Sweden	9.7	509,624	208,744	83,537	77,232	54,107	33,600	18,568	24,181	9,655	310,157	189,812	120,345
Småland & Islands	9.3	488,305	177,672	91,902	49,644	83,569	42,350	14,893	19,384	8,891	246,700	232,714	13,986
South Sweden	14.2	746,848	283,076	199,564	65,552	76,771	31,270	31,900	27,284	31,431	375,912	339,505	36,407
Stockholm County	19.5	1,026,227	299,343	346,594	111,021	104,282	22,185	68,186	49,978	24,638	460,342	541,247	80,905
Upper Norrland	6.0	318,116	144,167	37,432	60,347	27,332	17,484	13,310	13,107	4,937	217,621	95,558	122,063
West Sweden	19.8	1,042,766	347,478	230,403	125,966	147,107	57,200	52,151	48,981	33,480	522,425	486,861	35,564
Total	100.0	5,260,109	1,914,426	1,204,926	631,011	618,033	269,762	248,076	236,699	137,176	2,782,136	2,340,797	441,339
Source: SCB

== Constituency results ==
=== Percentage share ===
Constituency	Land	Turnout	Share	Votes	S	M	V	KD	C	FP	MP	Other	Left	Right	Margin
Constituency		%	%		%	%	%	%	%	%	%	%	%	%	
Blekinge	G	82.3	1.8	93,756	42.4	19.2	13.1	11.0	5.3	3.6	3.9	1.4	59.4	39.1	19,022
Dalarna	S	80.3	3.2	169,773	39.3	16.9	14.8	11.4	6.4	3.4	5.1	2.7	59.2	38.1	35,747
Gothenburg	G	78.9	5.0	263,181	29.3	25.8	14.9	12.0	1.7	6.6	5.7	3.9	50.0	46.2	10,080
Gotland	G	79.8	0.7	34,201	34.8	19.2	10.8	8.7	15.0	3.4	5.7	2.4	51.3	46.3	1,701
Gävleborg	N	79.4	3.2	170,128	42.5	13.9	16.6	9.7	7.0	3.5	5.1	1.6	64.2	34.2	51,128
Halland	G	82.8	3.1	164,049	31.8	24.7	8.6	12.8	8.4	4.3	3.9	5.5	44.3	50.2	9,678
Jämtland	N	80.5	1.5	81,025	41.3	13.8	15.2	7.6	12.1	2.8	5.7	1.6	62.1	36.3	20,950
Jönköping	G	83.7	3.8	199,750	34.4	18.4	8.8	22.8	6.7	3.2	3.6	2.1	46.8	51.1	8,505
Kalmar	G	81.6	2.8	145,502	39.4	18.3	11.5	13.3	9.2	2.8	3.9	1.5	54.8	43.7	16,102
Kronoberg	G	82.3	2.1	108,852	36.5	20.1	10.7	14.4	9.6	2.9	4.1	1.5	51.4	47.1	4,688
Malmö	G	77.3	2.7	140,635	41.9	27.7	8.6	7.6	1.1	3.5	3.5	6.0	54.1	39.9	19,871
Norrbotten	N	82.0	3.0	160,277	47.4	11.8	22.2	6.5	4.4	3.0	3.4	1.4	72.9	25.6	75,768
Skåne NE	G	79.1	3.2	170,449	35.4	25.3	9.0	13.3	6.4	4.0	3.7	2.9	48.1	49.0	1,384
Skåne S	G	83.5	3.7	192,722	35.5	30.9	7.0	9.4	4.0	5.5	3.8	3.9	46.3	49.8	6,604
Skåne W	G	79.2	2.8	149,286	37.2	26.7	8.3	10.0	4.2	4.2	3.3	6.1	48.8	45.1	5,502
Stockholm	S	81.0	8.3	438,295	27.2	33.7	12.9	8.9	1.7	7.5	5.6	2.5	45.7	51.8	26,924
Stockholm County	S	82.1	11.2	587,932	30.6	33.8	9.2	11.1	2.5	6.0	4.4	2.4	44.2	53.4	53,981
Södermanland	S	81.8	2.9	152,473	43.4	19.3	10.8	10.9	4.8	4.1	4.9	1.7	59.1	39.2	30,360
Uppsala	S	81.9	3.2	170,096	34.4	23.8	10.9	10.7	5.8	6.2	5.7	2.4	51.0	46.5	7,629
Värmland	S	81.0	3.2	169,723	41.1	18.4	14.1	10.7	6.4	4.0	4.1	1.3	59.2	39.5	33,470
Västerbotten	N	82.1	3.0	157,839	43.2	11.7	15.7	10.7	6.6	5.4	4.9	1.7	63.8	34.5	46,295
Västernorrland	N	81.6	3.0	157,892	45.1	13.7	14.8	10.2	6.6	3.6	4.1	1.9	64.0	34.1	47,119
Västmanland	S	80.4	2.9	150,609	41.1	19.9	13.3	10.8	4.7	4.5	4.3	1.4	58.7	39.8	28,444
Västra Götaland E	G	81.9	3.0	156,392	36.1	19.3	11.3	15.7	8.1	3.9	4.0	1.7	51.3	47.0	6,826
Västra Götaland N	G	82.6	3.0	157,292	36.2	17.9	12.9	15.1	6.5	4.4	4.8	2.2	53.9	43.9	15,844
Västra Götaland S	G	82.7	2.1	109,793	36.2	20.2	11.6	15.3	7.1	3.6	4.6	1.4	52.5	46.2	6,885
Västra Götaland W	G	82.6	3.7	192,059	33.7	21.5	11.5	15.2	4.4	5.6	4.5	3.5	49.7	46.8	5,607
Örebro	S	81.9	3.2	166,371	42.1	16.7	13.6	11.3	5.0	4.8	4.3	2.3	60.0	37.7	37,032
Östergötland	G	82.4	4.7	249,757	37.2	22.0	11.1	13.1	5.1	3.8	4.8	2.8	53.1	44.1	22,345
Total		81.4	100.0	5,260,109	36.4	22.9	12.0	11.7	5.1	4.7	4.5	2.6	52.9	44.5	441,339
Source: SCB

=== By votes ===
Constituency	Land	Turnout	Share	Votes	S	M	V	KD	C	FP	MP	Other	Left	Right	Margin
Constituency		%	%												
Blekinge	G	82.3	1.8	93,756	39,762	18,040	12,282	10,330	4,923	3,401	3,672	1,346	55,716	36,694	19,022
Dalarna	S	80.3	3.2	169,773	66,696	28,691	25,118	19,373	10,908	5,731	8,636	4,620	100,450	64,703	35,747
Gothenburg	G	78.9	5.0	263,181	77,241	67,998	39,280	31,704	4,375	17,404	15,040	10,139	131,561	121,481	10,080
Gotland	G	79.8	0.7	34,201	11,885	6,572	3,692	2,973	5,119	1,168	1,956	836	17,533	15,832	1,701
Gävleborg	N	79.4	3.2	170,128	72,374	23,700	28,220	16,515	11,877	6,009	8,635	2,798	109,229	58,101	51,128
Halland	G	82.8	3.1	164,049	52,185	40,510	14,042	21,038	13,748	7,088	6,479	8,959	72,706	82,384	9,678
Jämtland	N	80.5	1.5	81,025	33,436	11,156	12,318	6,188	9,807	2,245	4,592	1,283	50,346	29,396	20,950
Jönköping	G	83.7	3.8	199,750	68,773	36,820	17,533	45,462	13,365	6,409	7,245	4,143	93,551	102,056	8,505
Kalmar	G	81.6	2.8	145,502	57,275	26,651	16,742	19,408	13,409	4,116	5,669	2,232	79,686	63,584	16,102
Kronoberg	G	82.3	2.1	108,852	39,739	21,859	11,677	15,726	10,457	3,200	4,514	1,680	55,930	51,242	4,688
Malmö	G	77.3	2.7	140,635	58,979	38,930	12,071	10,752	1,498	4,988	4,989	8,428	76,039	56,168	19,871
Norrbotten	N	82.0	3.0	160,277	75,942	18,914	35,547	10,407	6,997	4,780	5,377	2,313	116,866	41,098	75,768
Skåne NE	G	79.1	3.2	170,449	60,415	43,078	15,358	22,651	10,988	6,738	6,298	4,923	82,071	83,455	1,384
Skåne S	G	83.5	3.7	192,722	68,375	59,613	13,494	18,075	7,634	10,563	7,412	7,556	89,281	95,885	6,604
Skåne W	G	79.2	2.8	149,286	55,545	39,903	12,347	14,963	6,227	6,210	4,913	9,178	72,805	67,303	5,502
Stockholm	S	81.0	8.3	438,295	119,270	147,599	56,663	39,100	7,493	33,027	24,362	10,781	200,295	227,219	26,924
Stockholm County	S	82.1	11.2	587,932	180,073	198,995	54,358	65,182	14,692	35,159	25,616	13,857	260,047	314,028	53,981
Södermanland	S	81.8	2.9	152,473	66,147	29,499	16,528	16,657	7,330	6,265	7,436	2,611	90,111	59,751	30,360
Uppsala	S	81.9	3.2	170,096	58,503	40,546	18,620	18,135	9,855	10,616	9,658	4,163	86,781	79,152	7,629
Värmland	S	81.0	3.2	169,723	69,674	31,146	23,894	18,219	10,815	6,828	6,910	2,237	100,478	67,008	33,470
Västerbotten	N	82.1	3.0	157,839	68,225	18,518	24,800	16,925	10,487	8,530	7,730	2,624	100,755	54,460	46,295
Västernorrland	N	81.6	3.0	157,892	71,257	21,616	23,304	16,072	10,491	5,678	6,415	3,059	100,976	53,857	47,119
Västmanland	S	80.4	2.9	150,609	61,841	29,902	20,052	16,260	7,043	6,791	6,547	2,173	88,440	59,996	28,444
Västra Götaland E	G	81.9	3.0	156,392	56,475	30,254	17,605	24,556	12,606	6,034	6,196	2,666	80,276	73,450	6,826
Västra Götaland N	G	82.6	3.0	157,292	57,002	28,117	20,219	23,828	10,181	6,863	7,612	3,470	84,833	68,989	15,844
Västra Götaland S	G	82.7	2.1	109,793	39,791	22,144	12,719	16,775	7,781	4,004	5,079	1,500	57,589	50,704	6,885
Västra Götaland W	G	82.6	3.7	192,059	64,784	41,380	22,101	29,206	8,509	10,758	8,575	6,746	95,460	89,853	5,607
Örebro	S	81.9	3.2	166,371	69,967	27,808	22,660	18,732	8,305	7,937	7,187	3,775	99,814	62,782	37,032
Östergötland	G	82.4	4.7	249,757	92,795	54,967	27,767	32,821	12,842	9,536	11,949	7,080	132,511	110,166	22,345
Total		81.4	100.0	5,260,109	1,914,426	1,204,926	631,011	618,033	269,762	248,076	236,699	137,176	2,782,136	2,340,797	441,339
Source: SCB

== 1994–1998 bloc comparison ==
=== Percentage share ===
Constituency	Land	Votes 1994	Left 1994	Right 1994	Win 1994	Votes 1998	Left 1998	Right 1998	Win 1998	Change
Constituency			%	%	%		%	%	%	%
Blekinge	G	100,235	63.79	34.58	29.21	93,756	59.43	39.14	20.29	8.92
Dalarna	S	184,056	62.41	35.80	26.61	169,773	59.17	38.11	21.06	5.55
Gothenburg	G	271,830	54.89	42.39	12.50	263,181	49.99	46.16	3.83	8.67
Gotland	G	37,009	55.39	42.94	12.45	34,201	51.26	46.29	4.97	7.48
Gävleborg	N	186,959	67.00	31.31	35.69	170,128	64.20	34.15	30.05	5.64
Halland	G	170,741	49.29	48.44	0.85	164,049	44.32	50.22	5.90	6.75
Jämtland	N	88,488	63.94	34.83	29.11	81,025	62.14	36.28	25.86	3.25
Jönköping	G	200,764	50.31	47.63	2.68	199,750	46.83	51.09	4.26	6.94
Kalmar	G	158,424	57.49	40.65	16.84	145,502	54.77	43.70	11.07	5.77
Kronoberg	G	115,735	53.19	45.00	8.19	108,852	51.38	47.07	4.31	3.88
Malmö	G	146,509	56.87	37.78	19.09	140,635	54.07	39.94	14.13	4.96
Norrbotten	N	174,045	75.54	23.06	52.48	160,277	72.92	25.64	47.28	5.20
Skåne NE	G	185,380	52.83	44.14	8.69	170,449	48.15	48.96	0.81	9.50
Skåne S	G	200,809	50.26	46.11	4.15	192,722	46.33	49.75	3.42	7.57
Skåne W	G	160,415	54.26	41.97	12.29	149,286	48.77	45.08	3.69	8.60
Stockholm	S	438,432	49.06	48.58	0.48	438,295	45.70	51.84	6.14	6.62
Stockholm County	S	594,998	48.12	49.57	1.45	587,932	44.23	53.41	9.18	7.73
Södermanland	S	164,273	62.14	35.77	26.37	152,473	59.10	39.19	19.91	6.46
Uppsala	S	176,494	54.83	43.02	11.81	170,096	51.02	46.53	4.49	7.32
Värmland	S	185,145	60.91	37.49	23.42	169,723	59.20	39.48	19.72	3.70
Västerbotten	N	166,348	65.17	33.64	31.53	157,839	63.83	34.50	29.33	2.20
Västernorrland	N	173,210	66.58	32.08	34.50	157,892	63.95	34.11	29.84	4.66
Västmanland	S	164,306	62.21	35.56	26.65	150,609	58.72	39.84	18.88	7.77
Västra Götaland E	G	179,026	53.15	44.66	8.49	156,392	51.33	46.97	4.36	4.13
Västra Götaland N	G	167,155	57.06	41.02	16.04	157,292	53.93	43.86	10.07	5.97
Västra Götaland S	G	117,918	55.75	42.73	13.02	109,793	52.45	46.18	6.27	6.75
Västra Götaland W	G	201,744	54.15	43.53	10.62	192,059	49.70	46.78	2.92	7.70
Örebro	S	178,636	62.53	35.49	27.04	166,371	59.99	37.74	22.25	4.79
Östergötland	G	266,456	56.63	40.82	15.81	249,757	53.06	44.11	8.95	6.86
Total		5,555,540	56.45	41.29	15.16	5,260,109	52.89	44.50	8.39	6.77

=== By votes ===
Constituency	Land	Votes 1994	Left 1994	Right 1994	Win 1994	Votes 1998	Left 1998	Right 1998	Win 1998	Change
Constituency	#									
Blekinge	G	100,235	63,935	34,665	29,270	93,756	55,716	36,694	19,022	10,248
Dalarna	S	184,056	114,872	65,899	48,973	169,773	100,450	64,703	35,747	13,226
Gothenburg	G	271,830	149,205	115,218	33,987	263,181	131,561	121,481	10,080	23,907
Gotland	G	37,009	20,501	15,893	4,608	34,201	17,533	15,832	1,701	2,907
Gävleborg	N	186,959	125,270	58,534	66,736	170,128	109,229	58,101	51,128	15,608
Halland	G	170,741	84,150	82,714	1,436	164,049	72,706	82,384	9,678	11,114
Jämtland	N	88,488	56,580	30,821	25,759	81,025	50,346	29,396	20,950	4,809
Jönköping	G	200,764	101,009	95,614	5,395	199,750	93,551	102,056	8,505	13,900
Kalmar	G	158,424	91,075	64,393	26,682	145,502	79,686	63,584	16,102	10,580
Kronoberg	G	115,735	61,559	52,083	9,476	108,852	55,930	51,242	4,688	4,788
Malmö	G	146,509	83,319	55,358	27,961	140,635	76,039	56,168	19,871	8,090
Norrbotten	N	174,045	131,469	40,141	91,328	160,277	116,866	41,098	75,768	15,560
Skåne NE	G	185,380	97,935	81,821	16,114	170,449	82,071	83,455	1,384	17,498
Skåne S	G	200,809	100,934	92,586	8,348	192,722	89,281	95,885	6,604	14,952
Skåne W	G	160,415	87,039	67,334	19,705	149,286	72,805	67,303	5,502	14,203
Stockholm	S	438,432	215,085	212,988	2,097	438,295	200,295	227,219	26,924	29,021
Stockholm County	S	594,998	286,294	294,912	8,618	587,932	260,047	314,028	53,981	45,363
Södermanland	S	164,273	102,085	58,757	43,328	152,473	90,111	59,751	30,360	12,968
Uppsala	S	176,494	96,769	75,920	20,849	170,096	86,781	79,152	7,629	13,220
Värmland	S	185,145	112,781	69,408	43,373	169,723	100,478	67,008	33,470	9,903
Västerbotten	N	166,348	108,417	55,967	52,450	157,839	100,755	54,460	46,295	6,155
Västernorrland	N	173,210	115,324	55,566	59,758	157,892	100,976	53,857	47,119	12,639
Västmanland	S	164,306	102,214	58,429	43,785	150,609	88,440	59,996	28,444	15,341
Västra Götaland E	G	179,026	95,146	79,960	15,186	156,392	80,276	73,450	6,826	8,360
Västra Götaland N	G	167,155	95,372	68,568	26,804	157,292	84,833	68,989	15,844	10,960
Västra Götaland S	G	117,918	65,744	50,386	15,358	109,793	57,589	50,704	6,885	8,473
Västra Götaland W	G	201,744	109,240	87,827	21,413	192,059	95,460	89,853	5,607	15,806
Örebro	S	178,636	111,705	63,397	48,308	166,371	99,814	62,782	37,032	11,276
Östergötland	G	266,456	150,907	108,777	42,130	249,757	132,511	110,166	22,345	19,785
Total		5,555,540	3,135,935	2,293,936	841,999	5,260,109	2,782,136	2,340,797	441,339	400,660

== Municipal summary ==
Location	County	Turnout	Votes	S	M	V	KD	C	FP	MP	Other	Left	Right
Ale	Västra Götaland	82.7	14,602	39.7	16.7	15.9	13.3	4.9	3.4	4.4	1.6	60.1	38.4
Alingsås	Västra Götaland	84.6	21,521	30.8	19.6	13.1	18.2	4.6	5.8	5.9	1.9	49.9	48.2
Alvesta	Kronoberg	81.5	11,411	37.7	17.7	10.2	15.1	12.1	2.1	3.6	1.5	51.4	47.0
Aneby	Jönköping	84.9	4,149	28.2	14.8	6.9	30.6	10.4	2.9	4.1	2.0	39.3	58.7
Arboga	Västmanland	82.0	8,589	41.9	17.9	13.5	10.7	5.2	4.1	5.9	0.8	61.4	37.8
Arjeplog	Norrbotten	79.0	2,166	44.2	7.5	24.6	7.6	6.0	2.7	3.9	3.5	72.7	23.9
Arvidsjaur	Norrbotten	82.0	4,807	49.2	8.4	24.6	5.5	5.4	3.2	2.7	1.0	76.5	22.5
Arvika	Värmland	77.3	15,424	41.2	16.0	14.4	11.7	6.4	4.2	5.3	0.9	60.9	38.3
Askersund	Örebro	81.8	7,273	42.5	15.8	12.8	11.5	8.5	3.5	3.6	1.9	58.9	39.2
Avesta	Dalarna	80.8	14,159	46.7	13.5	14.8	9.4	6.7	2.7	4.3	2.0	65.8	32.3
Bengtsfors	Västra Götaland	79.1	6,624	41.5	16.0	10.5	14.1	9.5	3.5	3.8	1.1	55.8	43.1
Berg	Jämtland	78.1	4,969	36.6	11.6	13.9	7.9	20.2	2.0	5.7	2.1	56.3	41.7
Bjurholm	Västerbotten	80.8	1,776	36.4	19.0	5.5	13.7	11.3	10.4	2.3	1.4	44.2	54.4
Bjuv	Skåne	78.5	7,643	49.3	19.2	10.3	8.6	3.9	3.0	2.2	3.5	61.8	34.7
Boden	Norrbotten	84.1	18,706	46.5	14.3	20.1	7.5	3.6	3.0	3.2	1.8	69.9	28.4
Bollebygd	Västra Götaland	86.5	4,869	34.0	23.2	10.6	15.7	6.6	2.8	5.2	1.9	49.8	48.4
Bollnäs	Gävleborg	78.7	16,504	38.7	13.1	16.7	11.5	9.4	3.3	6.0	1.5	61.1	37.4
Borgholm	Kalmar	79.8	7,025	25.7	21.7	8.5	18.2	17.7	2.7	4.0	1.6	38.2	60.3
Borlänge	Dalarna	80.6	28,150	44.7	15.0	15.2	9.2	4.1	3.3	5.4	3.2	65.3	31.5
Borås	Västra Götaland	82.1	57,345	37.1	21.3	13.0	14.5	3.9	4.2	4.7	1.5	54.7	43.8
Botkyrka	Stockholm	75.7	32,611	40.6	24.1	12.0	9.9	1.6	5.1	4.3	2.3	57.0	40.7
Boxholm	Östergötland	84.0	3,396	44.6	11.2	14.2	13.1	9.9	2.0	3.9	1.0	62.7	36.3
Bromölla	Skåne	80.3	7,180	51.7	13.4	15.8	7.6	3.3	2.9	3.3	2.0	70.8	27.2
Bräcke	Jämtland	78.8	4,760	48.2	10.4	17.3	4.1	11.7	2.1	4.5	1.7	70.0	28.2
Burlöv	Skåne	82.7	8,432	50.2	23.3	7.4	6.5	2.3	3.5	3.0	3.6	60.7	35.7
Båstad	Skåne	81.5	8,890	18.4	37.4	4.3	17.5	10.8	5.3	3.6	2.7	26.3	71.0
Dals-Ed	Västra Götaland	79.0	2,913	30.7	15.6	8.3	20.4	15.2	3.1	4.9	1.8	43.9	54.2
Danderyd	Stockholm	88.2	19,248	10.5	59.3	2.6	13.5	1.8	8.7	2.6	1.0	15.7	83.2
Degerfors	Örebro	83.4	6,847	54.8	8.7	17.7	7.5	4.5	2.3	3.4	1.1	75.9	23.0
Dorotea	Västerbotten	81.2	2,157	50.2	7.0	16.7	7.2	7.2	6.5	2.7	2.5	69.6	27.9
Eda	Värmland	78.2	4,736	44.5	14.6	14.1	10.5	9.8	2.5	3.4	0.6	61.9	37.4
Ekerö	Stockholm	86.2	12,615	24.0	38.9	7.2	12.9	3.6	6.0	5.5	2.0	36.6	61.4
Eksjö	Jönköping	83.0	10,751	31.2	18.7	8.2	21.5	11.0	3.2	4.2	2.0	43.5	54.4
Emmaboda	Kalmar	82.6	6,143	44.5	14.7	10.4	11.4	11.9	2.1	3.5	1.5	58.3	40.1
Enköping	Uppsala	81.6	21,320	36.4	25.4	8.1	11.7	9.7	3.2	4.3	1.2	48.7	50.1
Eskilstuna	Södermanland	79.7	50,641	44.9	18.9	11.5	10.0	3.5	4.3	4.8	2.1	61.2	36.7
Eslöv	Skåne	79.6	16,101	43.7	21.5	7.9	9.0	8.5	3.1	3.2	3.1	54.9	42.0
Essunga	Västra Götaland	82.6	3,571	29.2	23.2	7.8	15.0	15.7	3.1	4.1	1.9	41.1	57.0
Fagersta	Västmanland	79.8	7,740	47.9	15.5	18.9	7.8	2.7	3.1	3.1	1.0	69.9	29.0
Falkenberg	Halland	83.2	23,570	33.1	19.5	8.1	11.5	13.8	3.6	4.0	6.5	45.2	48.3
Falköping	Västra Götaland	81.7	19,158	32.7	19.3	10.4	18.5	9.7	3.2	4.4	1.7	47.5	50.7
Falun	Dalarna	81.1	32,490	33.2	22.2	12.4	12.6	5.3	4.6	5.8	3.8	51.4	44.8
Filipstad	Värmland	78.6	7,353	50.3	12.3	20.2	6.3	3.5	3.4	2.9	1.1	73.4	25.5
Finspång	Östergötland	84.3	13,830	46.2	14.9	14.5	11.4	4.4	2.9	4.0	1.6	64.8	33.6
Flen	Stockholm	81.4	9,924	43.3	17.6	12.1	11.2	6.8	2.7	4.9	1.6	60.2	38.3
Forshaga	Värmland	82.6	7,086	48.7	15.6	13.3	9.0	5.3	3.1	3.8	1.2	65.7	33.1
Färgelanda	Västra Götaland	80.9	4,227	37.0	14.1	9.6	13.2	17.4	3.9	2.9	2.0	49.5	48.5
Gagnef	Dalarna	81.7	6,078	35.7	14.5	12.3	14.3	10.3	2.8	7.3	2.8	55.3	41.9
Gislaved	Jönköping	82.0	16,933	37.4	20.3	7.3	16.4	9.7	3.3	3.7	1.9	48.5	49.7
Gnesta	Södermanland	81.3	5,634	34.1	20.8	10.0	13.0	10.7	3.4	6.8	1.1	50.9	48.0
Gnosjö	Jönköping	82.6	5,558	29.4	19.4	5.7	31.2	6.4	2.9	2.9	2.2	37.9	59.9
Gothenburg	Västra Götaland	78.9	263,181	29.3	25.8	14.9	12.0	1.7	6.6	5.7	3.9	50.0	46.2
Gotland	Gotland	79.8	34,201	34.8	19.2	10.8	8.7	15.0	3.4	5.7	2.4	51.3	46.3
Grums	Värmland	78.7	5,807	50.9	12.7	14.6	9.4	6.5	2.1	2.8	1.0	68.3	30.7
Grästorp	Västra Götaland	82.4	3,612	28.8	24.6	8.6	16.9	13.0	3.8	3.0	1.4	40.3	58.3
Gullspång	Västra Götaland	82.4	3,719	37.1	16.6	14.7	13.6	8.7	1.9	5.6	1.7	57.4	40.8
Gällivare	Norrbotten	77.1	12,507	43.2	10.6	33.5	4.6	1.7	1.9	3.2	1.2	80.0	18.7
Gävle	Gävleborg	80.3	54,135	43.0	17.8	14.7	9.9	3.2	4.8	5.2	1.5	62.8	35.7
Götene	Västra Götaland	84.2	8,206	35.6	16.7	11.9	17.4	9.1	3.8	4.0	1.5	51.5	47.1
Habo	Jönköping	85.8	5,741	31.1	20.9	7.7	26.2	5.8	2.6	3.7	2.0	42.5	55.5
Hagfors	Värmland	82.6	9,411	51.7	9.4	20.7	6.8	6.5	1.7	2.7	0.6	75.0	24.4
Hallsberg	Örebro	83.0	9,862	46.3	13.4	13.9	10.5	6.5	3.4	4.0	2.0	64.2	33.8
Hallstahammar	Västmanland	79.5	8,745	49.7	14.0	16.2	8.3	3.7	3.3	3.6	1.1	69.6	29.3
Halmstad	Halland	81.3	50,493	35.9	23.9	9.7	10.8	4.6	4.5	4.2	6.5	49.8	43.7
Hammarö	Värmland	85.2	8,643	43.7	21.4	13.7	10.0	2.0	3.8	4.1	1.3	61.5	37.2
Haninge	Stockholm	79.8	35,549	38.2	25.6	11.6	9.8	2.0	4.3	4.6	3.9	54.3	41.8
Haparanda	Norrbotten	68.4	4,330	45.2	15.9	16.9	6.2	9.3	1.7	1.9	2.9	64.0	33.0
Heby	Västmanland	82.3	8,028	37.4	15.7	12.3	12.2	14.5	2.6	4.0	1.2	53.7	45.1
Hedemora	Dalarna	80.1	9,637	40.0	15.4	16.0	10.4	8.8	2.5	5.3	1.6	61.3	37.1
Helsingborg	Skåne	78.2	67,022	34.8	28.9	9.2	10.0	1.8	4.6	3.3	7.5	47.3	45.2
Herrljunga	Västra Götaland	83.8	5,828	28.8	16.4	9.5	19.8	13.6	5.2	4.6	2.2	42.8	55.0
Hjo	Västra Götaland	83.7	5,609	32.3	20.6	11.3	18.5	6.4	5.4	4.2	1.4	47.8	50.8
Hofors	Gävleborg	79.4	6,480	51.9	9.8	21.3	6.2	3.8	2.4	3.5	1.0	76.8	22.2
Huddinge	Stockholm	81.0	42,829	34.0	30.7	11.0	10.0	1.7	5.5	4.2	2.9	49.2	47.9
Hudiksvall	Gävleborg	78.5	22,397	38.2	11.8	17.6	9.9	10.9	2.6	7.0	2.0	62.8	35.3
Hultsfred	Kalmar	81.3	9,420	41.8	13.9	12.9	13.6	12.4	1.8	2.2	1.4	56.9	41.7
Hylte	Halland	80.7	6,122	39.5	16.1	7.6	12.6	13.8	3.2	3.3	4.0	50.4	45.6
Håbo	Uppsala	81.4	9,503	33.9	34.1	7.5	11.6	3.2	3.7	3.9	2.2	45.3	52.6
Hällefors	Örebro	79.9	5,022	54.6	10.7	17.6	5.6	3.4	3.3	3.9	0.8	76.2	23.0
Härjedalen	Jämtland	77.4	7,129	46.8	12.8	17.0	6.7	8.1	2.8	3.9	2.0	67.7	30.4
Härnösand	Västernorrland	81.3	16,520	40.1	17.7	13.3	10.9	7.0	3.9	5.5	1.5	59.0	39.5
Härryda	Västra Götaland	84.8	17,068	31.6	25.2	11.3	14.0	3.2	6.2	4.8	3.7	47.6	48.6
Hässleholm	Skåne	79.4	29,025	34.4	21.8	9.6	15.2	8.3	3.4	4.2	3.1	48.2	48.7
Höganäs	Skåne	83.5	14,295	30.5	33.4	6.4	13.8	3.0	5.7	3.3	3.9	40.2	55.9
Högsby	Kalmar	80.0	3,958	40.4	13.9	14.2	14.9	10.9	1.9	3.0	0.8	57.6	41.7
Hörby	Skåne	78.6	7,952	30.3	23.5	5.6	15.2	13.3	3.7	4.3	4.1	40.2	55.6
Höör	Skåne	79.3	7,763	31.8	25.9	7.0	11.6	6.9	3.3	5.2	8.3	44.0	47.7
Jokkmokk	Norrbotten	81.1	3,906	46.3	9.1	27.9	5.8	2.3	3.1	4.6	0.9	78.8	20.3
Järfälla	Stockholm	83.8	34,666	33.8	30.3	9.5	11.7	1.7	6.1	4.5	2.3	47.8	49.9
Jönköping	Jönköping	83.8	71,370	35.0	19.2	9.6	22.6	3.7	3.7	3.7	2.5	48.3	49.2
Kalix	Norrbotten	82.4	11,459	52.9	10.3	18.1	5.0	5.8	2.8	4.2	1.0	75.2	23.8
Kalmar	Kalmar	82.7	36,355	38.0	22.7	11.0	12.4	5.3	3.7	4.8	2.0	53.9	44.2
Karlsborg	Västra Götaland	83.5	4,692	40.2	17.1	10.3	16.5	6.8	3.9	3.5	1.6	54.0	44.4
Karlshamn	Blekinge	82.1	19,464	44.5	16.8	15.3	9.8	4.5	3.2	4.7	1.3	64.5	34.2
Karlskoga	Örebro	81.0	19,766	47.2	17.3	14.8	9.2	2.2	3.4	2.9	2.9	64.9	32.1
Karlskrona	Blekinge	83.8	38,129	39.9	21.1	12.0	12.2	5.2	4.3	3.8	1.6	55.7	42.7
Karlstad	Värmland	82.8	50,206	36.4	23.2	12.7	12.0	4.1	4.7	4.9	1.9	54.0	44.1
Katrineholm	Södermanland	83.5	20,002	47.4	16.4	9.8	9.6	5.5	4.0	5.4	2.0	62.5	35.5
Kil	Värmland	81.9	7,088	37.2	19.8	12.2	13.1	7.7	4.2	4.5	1.3	53.9	44.8
Kinda	Östergötland	82.8	6,239	34.7	16.0	9.4	18.3	13.2	2.7	4.1	1.7	48.1	50.2
Kiruna	Norrbotten	78.4	14,566	49.2	10.7	27.2	5.1	1.2	2.2	2.8	1.6	79.1	19.2
Klippan	Skåne	75.5	8,810	35.0	27.3	8.3	13.8	6.0	3.3	2.9	3.4	46.2	50.4
Kramfors	Västernorrland	82.1	14,324	48.2	10.5	15.5	8.2	10.5	2.1	3.4	1.5	67.1	31.3
Kristianstad	Skåne	79.8	43,548	38.5	25.4	8.8	11.4	4.4	4.8	4.0	2.8	51.3	45.9
Kristinehamn	Värmland	81.8	15,677	42.7	16.6	15.5	10.1	5.0	4.5	3.9	1.7	62.1	36.2
Krokom	Jämtland	81.1	8,543	39.8	12.6	13.8	7.9	15.9	2.0	6.7	1.3	60.3	38.4
Kumla	Örebro	82.8	11,489	43.6	15.9	13.0	12.1	5.9	4.2	3.3	2.0	59.9	38.1
Kungsbacka	Halland	85.5	38,558	24.1	34.2	6.9	15.7	5.3	5.9	3.9	3.9	35.0	61.1
Kungsör	Västmanland	81.9	4,892	39.7	19.0	13.6	10.7	7.2	3.9	4.4	1.5	57.8	40.7
Kungälv	Västra Götaland	84.9	22,450	34.6	22.0	11.2	15.6	5.4	4.6	4.5	2.0	50.3	47.7
Kävlinge	Skåne	83.9	14,564	42.1	27.7	6.6	8.3	4.0	3.9	2.6	4.8	51.3	43.8
Köping	Västmanland	79.3	14,575	44.1	16.0	16.2	9.6	5.6	3.2	3.5	1.8	63.8	34.4
Laholm	Halland	81.1	13,544	28.7	23.4	7.1	13.7	13.3	2.9	4.1	6.7	40.0	53.3
Landskrona	Skåne	79.6	21,183	43.9	25.0	8.2	6.6	2.1	3.8	2.9	7.5	54.9	37.5
Laxå	Örebro	80.7	4,057	46.4	11.4	15.0	12.4	4.9	3.4	3.5	3.1	64.9	32.1
Lekeberg	Örebro	82.5	4,264	32.7	16.7	10.7	15.9	14.0	3.7	4.4	1.9	47.8	50.3
Leksand	Dalarna	82.3	9,584	30.8	19.3	11.7	18.1	8.9	2.8	6.1	2.2	48.6	49.2
Lerum	Västra Götaland	86.0	20,971	28.4	25.2	12.4	17.5	2.9	5.9	5.6	2.2	46.3	51.5
Lessebo	Kronoberg	83.5	5,216	46.9	14.0	15.8	9.7	6.5	2.2	3.8	1.1	66.4	32.5
Lidingö	Stockholm	86.5	25,765	15.4	50.7	4.6	12.9	2.0	9.3	3.5	1.5	23.6	75.0
Lidköping	Västra Götaland	82.8	22,775	38.3	17.4	13.2	14.3	6.9	4.1	3.8	2.1	55.3	42.6
Lilla Edet	Västra Götaland	80.3	7,261	40.6	13.2	16.8	11.3	7.8	3.0	4.4	2.8	61.9	35.4
Lindesberg	Örebro	80.3	14,382	41.1	15.6	13.7	11.5	8.6	3.1	4.5	1.8	59.3	38.9
Linköping	Östergötland	83.8	81,832	32.7	25.6	10.0	14.3	4.1	5.5	5.1	2.6	47.8	49.6
Ljungby	Kronoberg	81.3	16,488	35.3	17.9	9.6	17.8	11.3	2.4	4.0	1.6	48.8	49.5
Ljusdal	Gävleborg	75.0	11,783	39.7	12.8	19.0	9.2	9.5	3.9	4.4	1.5	63.1	35.4
Ljusnarsberg	Örebro	76.4	3,429	47.7	10.7	19.7	7.8	6.4	2.1	4.1	1.5	71.5	27.0
Lomma	Skåne	88.1	11,499	31.1	38.8	3.6	11.8	2.5	5.4	3.1	3.9	37.7	58.4
Ludvika	Dalarna	80.4	16,620	46.7	13.1	20.8	8.5	2.7	2.7	3.6	1.9	71.1	27.0
Luleå	Norrbotten	83.1	44,385	44.2	15.6	19.1	7.1	4.1	4.3	4.4	1.2	67.7	31.1
Lund	Skåne	84.9	61,190	29.2	31.2	9.6	8.9	3.2	9.5	6.1	2.3	45.0	52.7
Lycksele	Västerbotten	81.2	8,261	44.8	9.5	16.7	13.1	3.7	7.4	3.1	1.6	64.6	33.8
Lysekil	Västra Götaland	82.0	9,266	46.0	16.0	12.3	9.4	3.5	6.4	5.0	1.3	63.3	35.2
Malmö	Skåne	77.3	140,635	41.9	27.7	8.6	7.6	1.1	3.5	3.5	6.0	54.1	39.9
Malung	Dalarna	82.3	6,943	39.5	20.6	15.0	9.7	7.4	4.1	2.7	1.0	57.2	41.8
Malå	Västerbotten	84.2	2,487	45.0	10.7	23.2	7.8	4.0	4.5	2.7	2.2	70.9	26.9
Mariestad	Västra Götaland	80.3	14,414	39.5	17.7	13.5	15.3	5.0	3.5	4.0	1.5	57.0	41.5
Mark	Västra Götaland	82.8	19,867	38.6	16.7	12.7	14.9	9.2	2.4	4.3	1.2	55.6	43.2
Markaryd	Kronoberg	80.4	5,983	39.4	16.4	10.0	18.8	8.3	1.8	3.5	1.8	52.8	45.3
Mellerud	Västra Götaland	79.7	5,975	30.8	17.8	9.6	16.0	13.5	3.2	5.4	3.6	45.8	50.5
Mjölby	Östergötland	82.4	15,673	40.9	18.8	11.9	13.3	6.6	3.1	3.7	1.7	56.5	41.8
Mora	Dalarna	77.8	12,050	35.0	18.3	13.3	14.0	6.6	4.0	6.0	2.9	54.2	42.9
Motala	Östergötland	81.8	25,206	44.2	16.6	13.1	12.0	4.4	3.3	4.6	1.8	61.9	36.3
Mullsjö	Jönköping	85.2	4,354	30.2	17.8	10.7	27.3	4.5	2.2	4.8	2.5	45.7	51.8
Munkedal	Västra Götaland	79.5	6,289	36.0	15.3	12.3	15.3	11.5	2.9	4.2	2.5	52.5	45.0
Munkfors	Värmland	81.3	2,798	57.1	8.1	16.4	6.1	5.7	2.9	2.3	1.2	75.9	22.9
Mölndal	Västra Götaland	83.1	32,808	31.5	23.4	11.8	13.4	2.4	6.6	4.2	6.7	47.5	45.8
Mönsterås	Kalmar	81.8	8,106	42.5	14.9	12.4	12.3	11.1	1.9	3.3	1.5	58.3	40.2
Mörbylånga	Kalmar	83.5	8,303	32.5	21.5	9.4	15.6	11.5	3.1	4.8	1.6	46.7	51.7
Nacka	Stockholm	83.9	41,785	25.3	40.0	9.0	10.1	2.0	7.3	4.5	1.7	38.9	59.4
Nora	Örebro	81.4	6,332	42.1	16.2	14.1	11.4	5.7	4.5	4.2	1.7	60.4	37.9
Norberg	Västmanland	82.6	3,756	42.4	13.7	25.2	6.0	4.9	2.7	4.0	1.2	71.6	27.2
Nordanstig	Gävleborg	76.9	6,205	36.2	9.0	16.7	10.9	14.5	3.3	5.9	3.6	58.8	37.6
Nordmaling	Västerbotten	81.0	4,776	43.3	12.0	11.9	11.9	10.7	5.8	2.7	1.7	57.9	40.4
Norrköping	Östergötland	80.1	71,096	37.3	23.9	11.6	11.2	3.2	3.1	5.2	4.5	54.0	41.5
Norrtälje	Stockholm	79.9	29,828	34.7	25.4	9.7	11.4	7.8	3.8	4.5	2.7	48.9	48.4
Norsjö	Västerbotten	82.5	3,070	40.8	8.5	18.1	12.7	11.5	4.2	2.2	1.9	61.2	36.9
Nybro	Kalmar	81.0	12,260	43.8	16.6	11.2	12.5	10.1	1.8	3.0	1.1	58.0	41.0
Nykvarn	Stockholm	83.8	4,370	42.4	26.1	7.9	8.4	4.2	5.4	4.0	1.6	54.3	44.1
Nyköping	Södermanland	83.7	30,627	43.2	18.8	10.6	12.3	5.5	4.0	4.1	1.5	57.9	40.6
Nynäshamn	Stockholm	81.4	13,648	37.8	24.5	12.9	10.9	3.2	3.8	4.8	2.0	55.5	42.5
Nässjö	Jönköping	84.5	18,798	38.3	16.3	10.6	20.1	6.8	2.9	3.4	1.6	52.3	46.1
Ockelbo	Gävleborg	79.2	3,805	41.4	11.0	21.5	8.7	11.5	1.6	3.5	0.7	66.5	32.8
Olofström	Blekinge	78.8	8,204	48.6	13.0	13.7	10.4	5.7	3.1	4.3	1.2	66.7	32.2
Orsa	Dalarna	78.8	4,225	33.7	14.9	17.5	15.2	7.3	2.9	6.1	2.4	57.3	40.3
Orust	Västra Götaland	81.4	9,090	31.2	21.0	12.6	16.1	7.5	5.2	4.1	2.2	47.9	49.9
Osby	Skåne	80.6	7,789	42.9	17.1	10.7	12.4	7.8	3.4	4.1	1.7	57.7	40.6
Oskarshamn	Kalmar	82.1	16,556	42.3	17.0	13.4	15.1	4.7	3.0	3.1	1.4	58.7	39.8
Ovanåker	Gävleborg	81.5	7,991	37.7	10.8	11.3	15.9	14.9	3.4	5.0	1.1	54.0	45.0
Oxelösund	Södermanland	83.2	6,891	55.2	12.1	14.8	7.7	2.1	2.9	3.7	1.5	73.7	24.8
Pajala	Norrbotten	80.6	4,816	42.4	9.4	30.1	7.6	4.4	1.6	2.1	2.4	74.6	23.0
Partille	Västra Götaland	83.5	18,861	30.8	24.5	12.5	15.4	1.6	6.6	4.4	4.2	47.7	48.1
Perstorp	Skåne	77.0	3,859	37.0	22.8	11.6	11.7	5.3	3.8	2.4	5.4	51.0	43.5
Piteå	Norrbotten	86.3	26,594	53.3	8.1	19.5	6.9	5.2	2.7	2.6	1.7	75.3	23.0
Ragunda	Jämtland	80.8	4,041	45.5	9.9	17.3	4.2	14.3	1.5	4.6	2.6	67.5	29.9
Robertsfors	Västerbotten	83.0	4,459	36.7	10.9	11.8	12.2	19.1	5.0	3.7	0.7	52.3	47.1
Ronneby	Blekinge	82.4	18,146	41.7	19.3	13.8	10.3	6.6	3.6	3.7	1.0	59.2	39.8
Rättvik	Dalarna	76.4	6,570	33.1	19.8	11.0	13.0	8.7	5.0	5.1	4.3	49.2	46.5
Sala	Västmanland	80.4	12,853	36.0	19.0	11.2	12.9	10.6	3.8	5.4	1.1	52.6	46.3
Salem	Stockholm	84.7	7,399	31.8	30.7	9.5	11.9	2.2	6.4	4.9	2.7	46.2	51.1
Sandviken	Gävleborg	81.2	23,682	48.5	13.8	17.0	8.0	4.8	3.1	3.7	1.1	69.3	29.7
Sigtuna	Stockholm	78.9	18,156	33.5	31.0	9.6	11.1	3.2	4.3	3.7	3.6	46.8	49.6
Simrishamn	Skåne	77.9	11,667	30.3	28.6	9.7	13.3	7.5	3.5	4.1	2.9	44.2	52.9
Sjöbo	Skåne	77.2	9,438	33.8	27.2	6.7	10.8	10.0	3.1	3.0	5.6	43.5	51.0
Skara	Västra Götaland	81.5	11,182	37.8	21.1	10.6	13.2	7.4	4.2	4.5	1.3	52.8	45.9
Skinnskatteberg	Västmanland	81.1	2,876	48.3	11.6	17.7	8.2	6.8	2.1	4.3	1.1	70.3	28.6
Skellefteå	Västerbotten	83.0	46,467	48.8	9.1	15.5	10.2	6.2	4.8	4.0	1.5	68.2	30.4
Skurup	Skåne	77.2	7,553	36.8	26.0	6.7	9.8	9.8	3.2	3.4	4.3	46.9	48.8
Skövde	Västra Götaland	81.7	29,456	36.5	21.9	10.5	15.0	6.3	4.3	3.9	1.6	50.9	47.4
Smedjebacken	Dalarna	82.1	7,401	47.9	13.6	19.2	6.9	4.8	2.2	4.0	1.5	71.1	27.4
Sollefteå	Västernorrland	81.8	14,566	50.2	10.6	16.5	7.8	6.7	1.9	3.7	2.5	70.4	27.0
Sollentuna	Stockholm	85.1	33,066	26.4	36.8	7.5	12.7	2.2	7.6	4.4	2.3	38.3	59.4
Solna	Stockholm	80.4	33,488	29.7	33.2	11.2	10.2	1.9	6.9	4.4	2.4	45.4	52.2
Sorsele	Västerbotten	76.0	1,930	41.7	10.8	14.7	12.4	6.2	3.9	6.2	4.2	62.5	33.3
Sotenäs	Västra Götaland	81.2	5,981	37.5	23.8	8.4	14.8	3.8	5.9	3.9	1.8	49.9	48.3
Staffanstorp	Skåne	86.4	11,909	38.6	32.1	5.2	9.6	3.6	4.0	2.6	4.2	46.4	49.3
Stenungsund	Västra Götaland	82.1	11,750	33.6	23.1	11.4	15.0	4.4	5.9	4.3	2.4	49.2	48.4
Stockholm	Stockholm	81.0	438,295	27.2	33.7	12.9	8.9	1.7	7.5	5.6	2.5	45.7	51.8
Storfors	Värmland	83.5	2,995	47.8	15.2	16.7	8.1	5.5	2.8	3.0	0.9	67.5	31.6
Storuman	Västerbotten	76.6	4,260	37.7	12.9	15.5	14.5	6.6	5.2	3.6	4.1	56.8	39.1
Strängnäs	Södermanland	81.4	16,902	35.5	27.7	9.2	12.2	4.2	5.6	4.2	1.4	49.0	49.7
Strömstad	Västra Götaland	74.4	5,757	37.3	19.7	9.7	11.9	9.9	4.7	5.3	1.5	52.3	46.1
Strömsund	Jämtland	80.9	9,157	48.7	8.5	17.8	5.9	12.1	2.3	3.5	1.4	69.9	28.8
Sundbyberg	Stockholm	79.2	19,144	34.3	28.9	12.9	8.2	1.7	6.2	4.9	3.0	52.1	44.9
Surahammar	Västmanland	80.3	5,949	51.7	11.8	18.2	7.5	2.7	3.5	3.6	1.2	73.4	25.4
Sundsvall	Västernorrland	81.4	58,440	42.2	16.7	15.2	9.8	4.5	4.7	4.6	2.4	62.0	35.6
Sunne	Värmland	80.0	8,272	32.2	20.9	9.6	11.5	16.2	4.0	4.2	1.5	46.0	52.5
Svalöv	Skåne	80.2	7,327	38.9	22.8	6.4	9.6	12.7	3.1	2.9	3.5	48.2	48.2
Svedala	Skåne	84.3	10,753	46.5	24.7	6.4	9.6	3.7	2.8	3.0	3.3	55.8	40.9
Svenljunga	Västra Götaland	81.1	6,398	34.2	20.4	8.7	16.3	12.1	3.6	3.7	1.1	46.6	52.3
Säffle	Värmland	79.7	10,338	38.2	17.8	11.2	13.8	11.7	3.3	3.3	0.9	52.7	46.5
Säter	Dalarna	82.1	6,794	34.4	17.1	14.5	12.7	11.7	2.8	4.2	2.6	53.1	44.3
Sävsjö	Jönköping	82.5	7,021	28.6	16.8	7.1	28.1	12.1	2.5	3.2	1.7	38.8	59.5
Söderhamn	Gävleborg	79.2	17,146	45.5	11.7	18.8	8.0	6.6	2.2	4.3	2.9	68.6	28.5
Söderköping	Östergötland	83.1	8,362	31.6	26.3	8.9	13.8	9.5	2.7	5.0	2.3	45.5	52.2
Södertälje	Stockholm	77.2	39,428	41.4	22.5	10.3	10.3	3.4	3.9	5.4	2.8	57.1	40.1
Sölvesborg	Blekinge	80.0	9,813	43.9	22.2	11.3	10.5	4.4	2.6	2.9	2.1	58.1	39.7
Tanum	Västra Götaland	78.0	6,966	25.9	21.4	9.5	15.2	14.5	5.7	6.0	1.7	41.4	56.9
Tibro	Västra Götaland	83.0	6,602	37.5	16.6	12.2	17.7	6.7	4.7	3.7	1.0	53.4	45.7
Tidaholm	Västra Götaland	82.8	7,905	44.8	13.5	11.8	14.6	6.1	4.6	3.0	1.8	59.5	38.7
Tierp	Uppsala	81.3	12,096	48.4	12.4	10.5	9.3	10.8	3.1	3.9	1.6	62.8	35.5
Timrå	Västernorrland	80.9	11,200	49.3	9.0	19.1	7.7	6.3	2.8	3.5	2.2	71.9	25.9
Tingsryd	Kronoberg	78.8	8,188	33.2	20.6	9.7	14.8	14.6	1.6	4.2	1.3	47.1	51.6
Tjörn	Västra Götaland	83.1	8,811	25.5	23.2	7.6	26.1	2.8	7.6	3.8	3.4	36.9	59.7
Tomelilla	Skåne	75.6	7,015	33.9	25.5	7.7	12.1	11.1	3.0	3.6	3.0	45.3	51.7
Torsby	Värmland	80.5	8,798	42.1	19.4	17.2	6.7	8.4	2.1	3.3	0.8	62.6	36.6
Torsås	Kalmar	80.7	4,603	33.7	18.6	7.6	15.0	16.9	2.5	4.5	1.2	45.8	53.0
Tranemo	Västra Götaland	84.5	7,385	38.0	18.9	7.0	13.6	13.9	3.5	4.5	0.7	49.5	49.8
Tranås	Jönköping	82.7	11,211	37.3	19.5	9.8	21.0	4.9	2.8	3.5	1.1	50.6	48.3
Trelleborg	Skåne	80.6	22,235	45.8	22.1	7.0	9.6	3.6	2.4	2.9	6.5	55.7	37.7
Trollhättan	Västra Götaland	82.4	31,041	44.1	16.6	13.4	11.0	3.5	4.0	4.4	3.0	61.9	35.1
Trosa	Södermanland	83.8	5,977	34.7	26.4	8.8	14.3	4.1	4.6	5.3	1.7	48.9	49.4
Tyresö	Stockholm	84.5	21,460	32.3	33.5	9.6	10.2	1.8	5.7	4.8	2.0	46.7	51.3
Täby	Stockholm	87.5	37,476	18.2	49.8	4.3	12.8	1.7	8.7	3.0	1.5	25.5	73.0
Töreboda	Västra Götaland	78.8	5,685	35.1	17.0	11.9	14.5	12.7	2.6	4.4	1.8	51.4	46.8
Uddevalla	Västra Götaland	82.4	29,741	39.9	17.0	13.3	13.1	4.3	4.1	4.4	3.8	57.7	38.5
Ulricehamn	Västra Götaland	83.6	13,929	30.3	19.9	8.4	19.5	11.6	3.7	5.2	1.4	43.9	54.6
Umeå	Västerbotten	82.7	62,030	39.7	14.6	16.6	10.1	4.9	5.8	6.9	1.4	63.3	35.4
Upplands-Bro	Stockholm	81.6	11,033	36.4	27.1	11.2	12.6	2.2	4.5	4.0	2.0	51.6	46.4
Upplands Väsby	Stockholm	80.1	19,768	34.6	29.9	10.4	9.8	2.2	5.2	4.6	3.2	49.7	47.1
Uppsala	Uppsala	82.3	109,076	30.4	25.2	11.6	11.0	4.4	7.9	6.6	2.8	48.7	48.5
Uppvidinge	Kronoberg	81.7	6,017	38.6	14.2	14.1	12.6	13.3	2.5	3.6	1.1	56.3	42.6
Vadstena	Östergötland	84.1	4,936	36.4	21.4	9.6	15.4	6.3	3.7	5.1	2.1	51.1	46.8
Valdemarsvik	Östergötland	81.8	5,306	39.5	18.4	9.2	11.6	14.0	1.7	3.7	1.9	52.4	45.7
Vallentuna	Stockholm	83.6	13,705	26.7	35.4	7.7	13.3	4.4	5.5	4.9	2.1	39.3	58.5
Vansbro	Dalarna	78.2	4,461	39.4	13.9	13.9	12.9	10.7	2.5	3.7	2.9	57.1	40.0
Vara	Västra Götaland	80.4	9,806	27.7	25.2	7.9	16.3	14.1	3.1	3.3	2.4	38.9	58.7
Varberg	Halland	83.0	31,762	33.6	20.5	9.9	13.2	10.9	3.6	3.5	4.7	47.0	48.2
Vaxholm	Stockholm	85.8	5,279	24.1	39.5	7.8	12.5	3.2	6.3	5.3	1.3	37.2	61.4
Vellinge	Skåne	88.1	19,503	24.6	50.0	2.4	10.8	2.5	3.8	1.8	4.1	28.8	67.1
Vilhelmina	Västerbotten	79.3	4,887	46.8	7.8	17.4	11.3	5.6	4.8	2.9	3.4	67.1	29.5
Vimmerby	Kalmar	81.2	9,526	36.6	16.6	10.2	14.1	15.7	1.8	3.1	1.9	49.9	48.2
Vindeln	Västerbotten	79.3	3,796	35.8	13.7	9.9	15.0	12.9	6.8	4.0	2.1	49.6	48.3
Vingåker	Södermanland	83.9	5,875	44.8	15.0	10.4	10.5	6.7	3.2	8.4	1.1	63.6	35.4
Vårgårda	Västra Götaland	82.7	6,343	27.2	15.0	10.3	24.9	11.3	4.4	5.4	1.5	42.9	55.6
Vänersborg	Västra Götaland	82.2	22,198	37.3	16.8	13.7	14.7	6.7	4.0	4.7	2.1	55.6	42.2
Vännäs	Västerbotten	80.1	5,041	42.2	9.9	15.7	10.5	13.0	3.7	3.7	1.3	61.5	37.1
Värmdö	Stockholm	84.0	16,483	30.4	36.1	10.7	9.7	2.5	4.6	4.5	1.6	45.5	52.9
Västervik	Kalmar	79.9	23,247	42.3	16.4	13.0	11.6	7.6	3.3	4.5	1.2	59.8	39.0
Västerås	Västmanland	80.2	72,606	38.7	24.0	11.1	11.8	2.5	5.8	4.5	1.6	54.3	44.1
Växjö	Kronoberg	83.7	45,864	34.8	23.0	11.1	13.5	7.3	3.9	4.7	1.7	50.6	47.7
Ydre	Östergötland	86.3	2,681	28.3	15.0	7.3	25.7	14.2	2.9	4.7	1.8	40.4	57.9
Ystad	Skåne	79.1	15,646	38.4	28.0	7.3	8.7	5.3	4.4	3.2	4.7	48.9	46.4
Åmål	Västra Götaland	79.2	7,788	41.6	16.0	12.2	13.3	7.6	3.3	4.4	1.7	58.2	40.1
Ånge	Västernorrland	79.3	7,112	46.0	10.6	18.1	8.5	8.6	2.0	4.3	1.9	68.4	29.7
Åre	Jämtland	81.9	5,874	33.7	15.3	13.8	9.6	15.9	3.6	6.9	1.3	54.4	44.3
Årjäng	Värmland	72.3	5,091	29.7	17.0	9.5	16.7	10.4	12.5	3.3	0.8	42.6	56.6
Åsele	Västerbotten	81.2	2,442	50.5	9.1	11.8	8.4	10.6	3.6	2.6	3.4	64.9	31.7
Åstorp	Skåne	77.6	7,053	44.4	23.3	9.8	10.5	3.8	3.0	2.4	2.7	56.6	40.7
Åtvidaberg	Östergötland	84.5	7,639	45.1	15.3	11.4	12.4	7.5	2.4	3.9	1.9	60.5	37.6
Älmhult	Kronoberg	82.5	9,685	39.4	21.3	8.2	13.0	10.8	2.6	3.5	1.2	51.1	47.7
Älvdalen	Dalarna	75.5	4,611	38.4	13.2	16.0	11.9	10.1	2.7	5.2	2.6	59.6	37.8
Älvkarleby	Uppsala	81.7	5,460	56.8	10.4	16.8	5.6	2.2	3.3	3.3	1.6	76.9	21.5
Älvsbyn	Norrbotten	84.7	5,903	48.7	6.9	27.2	7.1	5.5	1.9	1.8	0.8	77.7	21.5
Ängelholm	Skåne	79.9	21,974	27.4	33.2	6.8	15.2	6.0	4.6	3.5	3.3	37.7	59.0
Öckerö	Västra Götaland	84.9	7,221	26.1	22.3	9.1	29.2	1.3	5.5	4.5	2.0	39.7	58.3
Ödeshög	Östergötland	83.5	3,561	33.5	17.3	8.6	19.5	12.0	2.6	4.8	1.6	47.0	51.4
Örebro	Örebro	82.4	73,648	38.0	19.2	12.5	12.3	3.8	6.5	5.1	2.6	55.6	41.8
Örkelljunga	Skåne	77.2	5,305	27.3	26.0	6.7	22.0	7.3	4.5	2.8	3.3	36.8	59.8
Örnsköldsvik	Västernorrland	82.2	35,730	47.5	11.5	11.7	13.4	8.2	3.5	3.1	1.2	62.2	36.6
Östersund	Jämtland	81.2	36,552	39.2	16.5	14.4	8.7	10.1	3.3	6.4	1.5	60.0	38.6
Österåker	Stockholm	83.8	19,133	28.4	36.4	8.1	13.0	2.4	5.5	4.4	1.9	40.9	57.3
Östhammar	Uppsala	80.0	12,641	42.5	18.4	10.5	8.8	9.8	3.3	4.1	2.5	57.1	40.3
Östra Göinge	Skåne	79.4	8,334	47.1	16.3	11.8	11.0	5.7	2.7	3.7	1.7	62.6	35.7
Överkalix	Norrbotten	80.6	2,775	53.2	7.3	21.0	3.9	9.3	2.2	2.5	0.7	76.6	22.7
Övertorneå	Norrbotten	80.5	3,357	39.6	12.7	22.0	8.3	11.6	1.4	2.7	1.6	64.3	34.1
Total		81.4	5,260,109	36.4	22.9	12.0	11.7	5.1	4.7	4.5	2.6	52.9	44.5
Source: SCB

== Municipal results ==
Votes by municipality. The municipalities are the color of the party that got the most votes within the coalition that won relative majority.

Cartogram of the map to the left with each municipality rescaled to the number of valid votes cast.

Map showing the voting shifts from the 1994 to the 1998 election. Darker blue indicates a municipality voted more towards the parties that formed the centre-right bloc. Darker red indicates a municipality voted more towards the parties that form the left-wing bloc.

Votes by municipality as a scale from red/Left-wing bloc to blue/Centre-right bloc.

Cartogram of vote with each municipality rescaled in proportion to number of valid votes cast. Deeper blue represents a relative majority for the centre-right coalition, brighter red represents a relative majority for the left-wing coalition.

=== Blekinge ===
Location	Turnout	Share	Votes	S	M	V	KD	C	FP	MP	Other	L-vote	R-vote	Left	Right	Margin
Location	%	%		%	%	%	%	%	%	%	%			%	%	
Karlshamn	82.1	20.8	19,464	44.5	16.8	15.3	9.8	4.5	3.2	4.7	1.3	12,554	6,657	64.5	34.2	5,897
Karlskrona	83.8	40.7	38,129	39.9	21.1	12.0	12.2	5.2	4.3	3.8	1.6	21,250	16,281	55.7	42.7	4,969
Olofström	78.8	8.8	8,204	48.6	13.0	13.7	10.4	5.7	3.1	4.3	1.2	5,469	2,638	66.7	32.2	2,831
Ronneby	82.4	19.4	18,146	41.7	19.3	13.8	10.3	6.6	3.6	3.7	1.0	10,738	7,220	59.2	39.8	3,518
Sölvesborg	80.0	10.5	9,813	43.9	22.2	11.3	10.5	4.4	2.6	2.9	2.1	5,705	3,898	58.1	39.7	1,807
Total	82.3	1.8	93,756	42.4	19.2	13.1	11.0	5.3	3.6	3.9	1.4	55,716	36,694	59.4	39.1	19,022
Source: SCB

=== Dalarna ===
Location	Turnout	Share	Votes	S	M	V	KD	C	FP	MP	Other	L-vote	R-vote	Left	Right	Margin
Location	%	%		%	%	%	%	%	%	%	%			%	%	
Avesta	80.8	8.3	14,159	46.7	13.5	14.8	9.4	6.7	2.7	4.3	2.0	9,310	4,569	65.8	32.3	4,741
Borlänge	80.6	16.6	28,150	44.7	15.0	15.2	9.2	4.1	3.3	5.4	3.2	18,380	8,879	65.3	31.5	9,501
Falun	81.1	19.1	32,490	33.2	22.2	12.4	12.6	5.3	4.6	5.8	3.8	16,704	14,540	51.4	44.8	2,164
Gagnef	81.7	3.6	6,078	35.7	14.5	12.3	14.3	10.3	2.8	7.3	2.8	3,361	2,546	55.3	41.9	815
Hedemora	80.1	5.7	9,637	40.0	15.4	16.0	10.4	8.8	2.5	5.3	1.6	5,905	3,577	61.3	37.1	2,328
Leksand	82.3	5.6	9,584	30.8	19.3	11.7	18.1	8.9	2.8	6.1	2.2	4,656	4,716	48.6	49.2	60
Ludvika	80.4	9.8	16,620	46.7	13.1	20.8	8.5	2.7	2.7	3.6	1.9	11,818	4,483	71.1	27.0	7,335
Malung	82.3	4.1	6,943	39.5	20.6	15.0	9.7	7.4	4.1	2.7	1.0	3,972	2,901	57.2	41.8	1,071
Mora	77.8	7.1	12,050	35.0	18.3	13.3	14.0	6.6	4.0	6.0	2.9	6,530	5,170	54.2	42.9	1,360
Orsa	78.8	2.5	4,225	33.7	14.9	17.5	15.2	7.3	2.9	6.1	2.4	2,420	1,704	57.3	40.3	716
Rättvik	76.4	3.9	6,570	33.1	19.8	11.0	13.0	8.7	5.0	5.1	4.3	3,233	3,053	49.2	46.5	180
Smedjebacken	82.1	4.4	7,401	47.9	13.6	19.2	6.9	4.8	2.2	4.0	1.5	5,263	2,027	71.1	27.4	3,236
Säter	82.1	4.0	6,794	34.4	17.1	14.5	12.7	11.7	2.8	4.2	2.6	3,606	3,008	53.1	44.3	598
Vansbro	78.2	2.6	4,461	39.4	13.9	13.9	12.9	10.7	2.5	3.7	2.9	2,546	1,785	57.1	40.0	761
Älvdalen	75.5	2.7	4,611	38.4	13.2	16.0	11.9	10.1	2.7	5.2	2.6	2,746	1,745	59.6	37.8	1,001
Total	80.3	3.2	169,773	39.3	16.9	14.8	11.4	6.4	3.4	5.1	2.7	100,450	64,703	59.2	38.1	35,747
Source: SCB

=== Gotland ===
Location	Turnout	Share	Votes	S	M	V	KD	C	FP	MP	Other	L-vote	R-vote	Left	Right	Margin
Location	%	%		%	%	%	%	%	%	%	%			%	%	
Gotland	79.8	100.0	34,201	34.8	19.2	10.8	8.7	15.0	3.4	5.7	2.4	17,535	15,832	51.3	46.3	1,703
Total	79.8	0.7	34,201	34.8	19.2	10.8	8.7	15.0	3.4	5.7	2.4	17,535	15,832	51.3	46.3	1,703
Source: SCB

=== Gävleborg ===
Location	Turnout	Share	Votes	S	M	V	KD	C	FP	MP	Other	L-vote	R-vote	Left	Right	Margin
Location	%	%		%	%	%	%	%	%	%	%			%	%	
Bollnäs	78.7	9.7	16,504	38.7	13.1	16.7	11.5	9.4	3.3	6.0	1.5	10,088	6,171	61.1	37.4	3,917
Gävle	80.3	31.8	54,135	43.0	17.8	14.7	9.9	3.2	4.8	5.2	1.5	34,014	19,336	62.8	35.7	14,678
Hofors	79.4	3.8	6,480	51.9	9.8	21.3	6.2	3.8	2.4	3.5	1.0	4,976	1,441	76.8	22.2	3,535
Hudiksvall	78.5	13.2	22,397	38.2	11.8	17.6	9.9	10.9	2.6	7.0	2.0	14,055	7,895	62.8	35.3	6,160
Ljusdal	75.0	6.9	11,783	39.7	12.8	19.0	9.2	9.5	3.9	4.4	1.5	7,430	4,177	63.1	35.4	3,253
Nordanstig	76.9	3.6	6,205	36.2	9.0	16.7	10.9	14.5	3.3	5.9	3.6	3,649	2,335	58.8	37.6	1,314
Ockelbo	79.2	2.2	3,805	41.4	11.0	21.5	8.7	11.5	1.6	3.5	0.7	2,530	1,248	66.5	32.8	1,282
Ovanåker	81.5	4.7	7,991	37.7	10.8	11.3	15.9	14.9	3.4	5.0	1.1	4,312	3,592	54.0	45.0	720
Sandviken	81.2	13.9	23,682	48.5	13.8	17.0	8.0	4.8	3.1	3.7	1.1	16,406	7,027	69.3	29.7	9,379
Söderhamn	79.2	10.1	17,146	45.5	11.7	18.8	8.0	6.6	2.2	4.3	2.9	11,769	4,879	68.6	28.5	6,890
Total	79.4	3.2	170,128	42.5	13.9	16.6	9.7	7.0	3.5	5.1	1.6	109,229	58,101	64.2	34.2	51,128
Source: SCB

=== Halland ===
Location	Turnout	Share	Votes	S	M	V	KD	C	FP	MP	Other	L-vote	R-vote	Left	Right	Margin
Location	%	%		%	%	%	%	%	%	%	%			%	%	
Falkenberg	83.2	14.4	23,570	33.1	19.5	8.1	11.5	13.8	3.6	4.0	6.5	10,651	11,395	45.2	48.3	744
Halmstad	81.3	30.8	50,493	35.9	23.9	9.7	10.8	4.6	4.5	4.2	6.5	25,132	22,081	49.8	43.7	3,051
Hylte	80.7	3.7	6,122	39.5	16.1	7.6	12.6	13.8	3.2	3.3	4.0	3,088	2,792	50.4	45.6	296
Kungsbacka	85.5	23.5	38,558	24.1	34.2	6.9	15.7	5.3	5.9	3.9	3.9	13,483	23,577	35.0	61.1	10,094
Laholm	81.1	8.3	13,544	28.7	23.4	7.1	13.7	13.3	2.9	4.1	6.7	5,414	7,223	40.0	53.3	1,809
Varberg	83.0	19.4	31,762	33.6	20.5	9.9	13.2	10.9	3.6	3.5	4.7	14,938	15,316	47.0	48.2	378
Total	82.8	3.1	164,049	31.8	24.7	8.6	12.8	8.4	4.3	3.9	5.5	72,706	82,384	44.3	50.2	9,678
Source: SCB

=== Jämtland ===
Location	Turnout	Share	Votes	S	M	V	KD	C	FP	MP	Other	L-vote	R-vote	Left	Right	Margin
Location	%	%		%	%	%	%	%	%	%	%			%	%	
Berg	78.1	6.1	4,969	36.6	11.6	13.9	7.9	20.2	2.0	5.7	2.1	2,796	2,071	56.3	41.7	725
Bräcke	78.8	5.9	4,760	48.2	10.4	17.3	4.1	11.7	2.1	4.5	1.7	3,333	1,344	70.0	28.2	1,989
Härjedalen	77.4	8.8	7,129	46.8	12.8	17.0	6.7	8.1	2.8	3.9	2.0	4,824	2,164	67.7	30.4	2,660
Krokom	81.1	10.5	8,543	39.8	12.6	13.8	7.9	15.9	2.0	6.7	1.3	5,150	3,281	60.3	38.4	1,869
Ragunda	80.8	5.0	4,041	45.5	9.9	17.3	4.2	14.3	1.5	4.6	2.6	2,727	1,208	67.5	29.9	1,519
Strömsund	80.9	11.3	9,157	48.7	8.5	17.8	5.9	12.1	2.3	3.5	1.4	6,398	2,633	69.9	28.8	3,765
Åre	81.9	7.2	5,874	33.7	15.3	13.8	9.6	15.9	3.6	6.9	1.3	3,195	2,602	54.4	44.3	593
Östersund	81.2	45.1	36,552	39.2	16.5	14.4	8.7	10.1	3.3	6.4	1.5	21,923	14,093	60.0	38.6	7,830
Total	80.5	1.5	81,025	41.3	13.8	15.2	7.6	12.1	2.8	5.7	1.6	50,346	29,396	62.1	36.3	20,950
Source: SCB

=== Jönköping ===
Location	Turnout	Share	Votes	S	M	V	KD	C	FP	MP	Other	L-vote	R-vote	Left	Right	Margin
Location	%	%		%	%	%	%	%	%	%	%			%	%	
Aneby	84.9	2.1	4,149	28.2	14.8	6.9	30.6	10.4	2.9	4.1	2.0	1,631	2,434	39.3	58.7	803
Eksjö	83.0	5.4	10,751	31.2	18.7	8.2	21.5	11.0	3.2	4.2	2.0	4,681	5,853	43.5	54.4	1,172
Gislaved	82.0	8.5	16,933	37.4	20.3	7.3	16.4	9.7	3.3	3.7	1.9	8,206	8,409	48.5	49.7	203
Gnosjö	82.6	2.8	5,558	29.4	19.4	5.7	31.2	6.4	2.9	2.9	2.2	2,107	3,328	37.9	59.9	1,221
Habo	85.8	2.9	5,741	31.1	20.9	7.7	26.2	5.8	2.6	3.7	2.0	2,440	3,186	42.5	55.5	746
Jönköping	83.8	35.7	71,370	35.0	19.2	9.6	22.6	3.7	3.7	3.7	2.5	34,460	35,128	48.3	49.2	668
Mullsjö	85.2	2.2	4,354	30.2	17.8	10.7	27.3	4.5	2.2	4.8	2.5	1,991	2,256	45.7	51.8	265
Nässjö	84.5	9.4	18,798	38.3	16.3	10.6	20.1	6.8	2.9	3.4	1.6	9,834	8,666	52.3	46.1	1,168
Sävsjö	82.5	3.5	7,021	28.6	16.8	7.1	28.1	12.1	2.5	3.2	1.7	2,726	4,175	38.8	59.5	1,449
Tranås	82.7	5.6	11,211	37.3	19.5	9.8	21.0	4.9	2.8	3.5	1.1	5,675	5,410	50.6	48.3	265
Vaggeryd	85.7	3.9	7,764	34.8	15.7	8.7	26.1	7.2	2.8	2.6	1.9	3,585	4,028	46.2	51.9	443
Vetlanda	83.6	8.5	16,936	32.3	16.1	9.6	22.8	10.9	3.1	3.9	1.5	7,743	8,945	45.7	52.8	1,202
Värnamo	83.8	9.6	19,164	34.8	19.0	6.0	23.6	7.8	3.0	3.4	2.4	8,472	10,238	44.2	53.4	1,766
Total	83.7	3.8	199,750	34.4	18.4	8.8	22.8	6.7	3.2	3.6	2.1	93,551	102,056	46.8	51.1	8,505
Source: SCB

=== Kalmar ===
Location	Turnout	Share	Votes	S	M	V	KD	C	FP	MP	Other	L-vote	R-vote	Left	Right	Margin
Location	%	%		%	%	%	%	%	%	%	%			%	%	
Borgholm	79.8	4.8	7,025	25.7	21.7	8.5	18.2	17.7	2.7	4.0	1.6	2,683	4,233	38.2	60.3	1,550
Emmaboda	82.6	4.2	6,143	44.5	14.7	10.4	11.4	11.9	2.1	3.5	1.5	3,582	2,466	58.3	40.1	1,116
Hultsfred	81.3	6.5	9,420	41.8	13.9	12.9	13.6	12.4	1.8	2.2	1.4	5,362	3,929	56.9	41.7	1,433
Högsby	80.0	2.7	3,958	40.4	13.9	14.2	14.9	10.9	1.9	3.0	0.8	2,278	1,649	57.6	41.7	629
Kalmar	82.7	25.0	36,355	38.0	22.7	11.0	12.4	5.3	3.7	4.8	2.0	19,579	16,051	53.9	44.2	3,528
Mönsterås	81.8	5.6	8,106	42.5	14.9	12.4	12.3	11.1	1.9	3.3	1.5	4,726	3,260	58.3	40.2	1,466
Mörbylånga	83.5	5.7	8,303	32.5	21.5	9.4	15.6	11.5	3.1	4.8	1.6	3,877	4,290	46.7	51.7	413
Nybro	81.0	8.4	12,260	43.8	16.6	11.2	12.5	10.1	1.8	3.0	1.1	7,106	5,023	58.0	41.0	2,083
Oskarshamn	82.1	11.4	16,556	42.3	17.0	13.4	15.1	4.7	3.0	3.1	1.4	9,726	6,597	58.7	39.8	3,129
Torsås	80.7	3.2	4,603	33.7	18.6	7.6	15.0	16.9	2.5	4.5	1.2	2,110	2,438	45.8	53.0	328
Vimmerby	81.2	6.5	9,526	36.6	16.6	10.2	14.1	15.7	1.8	3.1	1.9	4,755	4,592	49.9	48.2	163
Västervik	79.9	16.0	23,247	42.3	16.4	13.0	11.6	7.6	3.3	4.5	1.2	13,902	9,056	59.8	39.0	4,846
Total	81.6	2.8	145,502	39.4	18.3	11.5	13.3	9.2	2.8	3.9	1.5	79,686	63,584	54.8	43.7	16,102
Source: SCB

=== Kronoberg ===
Location	Turnout	Share	Votes	S	M	V	KD	C	FP	MP	Other	L-vote	R-vote	Left	Right	Margin
Location	%	%		%	%	%	%	%	%	%	%			%	%	
Alvesta	81.5	10.5	11,411	37.7	17.7	10.2	15.1	12.1	2.1	3.6	1.5	5,870	5,368	51.4	47.0	502
Lessebo	83.5	4.8	5,216	46.9	14.0	15.8	9.7	6.5	2.2	3.8	1.1	3,465	1,695	66.4	32.5	1,770
Ljungby	81.3	15.1	16,488	35.3	17.9	9.6	17.8	11.3	2.4	4.0	1.6	8,053	8,168	48.8	49.5	115
Markaryd	80.4	5.5	5,983	39.4	16.4	10.0	18.8	8.3	1.8	3.5	1.8	3,161	2,712	52.8	45.3	449
Tingsryd	78.8	7.5	8,188	33.2	20.6	9.7	14.8	14.6	1.6	4.2	1.3	3,856	4,223	47.1	51.6	367
Uppvidinge	81.7	5.5	6,017	38.6	14.2	14.1	12.6	13.3	2.5	3.6	1.1	3,386	2,562	56.3	42.6	824
Växjö	83.7	42.1	45,864	34.8	23.0	11.1	13.5	7.3	3.9	4.7	1.7	23,194	21,895	50.6	47.7	1,299
Älmhult	82.5	8.9	9,685	39.4	21.3	8.2	13.0	10.8	2.6	3.5	1.2	4,945	4,619	51.1	47.7	326
Total	82.3	2.1	108,852	36.5	20.1	10.7	14.4	9.6	2.9	4.1	1.5	55,930	51,242	51.4	47.1	4,688
Source: SCB

=== Norrbotten ===
Location	Turnout	Share	Votes	S	M	V	KD	C	FP	MP	Other	L-vote	R-vote	Left	Right	Margin
Location	%	%		%	%	%	%	%	%	%	%			%	%	
Arjeplog	79.0	1.4	2,166	44.2	7.5	24.6	7.6	6.0	2.7	3.9	3.5	1,574	517	72.7	23.9	1,057
Arvidsjaur	82.0	3.0	4,807	49.2	8.4	24.6	5.5	5.4	3.2	2.7	1.0	3,677	1,082	76.5	22.5	2,595
Boden	84.1	11.7	18,706	46.5	14.3	20.1	7.5	3.6	3.0	3.2	1.8	13,071	5,305	69.9	28.4	7,766
Gällivare	77.1	7.8	12,507	43.2	10.6	33.5	4.6	1.7	1.9	3.2	1.2	10,010	2,344	80.0	18.7	7,666
Haparanda	68.4	2.7	4,330	45.2	15.9	16.9	6.2	9.3	1.7	1.9	2.9	2,773	1,431	64.0	33.0	1,342
Jokkmokk	81.1	2.4	3,906	46.3	9.1	27.9	5.8	2.3	3.1	4.6	0.9	3,077	794	78.8	20.3	2,283
Kalix	82.4	7.1	11,459	52.9	10.3	18.1	5.0	5.8	2.8	4.2	1.0	8,614	2,730	75.2	23.8	5,884
Kiruna	78.4	9.1	14,566	49.2	10.7	27.2	5.1	1.2	2.2	2.8	1.6	11,532	2,807	79.1	19.2	8,725
Luleå	83.1	27.7	44,385	44.2	15.6	19.1	7.1	4.1	4.3	4.4	1.2	30,040	13,823	67.7	31.1	16,217
Pajala	80.6	3.0	4,816	42.4	9.4	30.1	7.6	4.4	1.6	2.1	2.4	3,592	1,109	74.6	23.0	2,483
Piteå	86.3	16.6	26,594	53.3	8.1	19.5	6.9	5.2	2.7	2.6	1.7	20,036	6,114	75.3	23.0	13,922
Älvsbyn	84.7	3.7	5,903	48.7	6.9	27.2	7.1	5.5	1.9	1.8	0.8	4,585	1,269	77.7	21.5	3,316
Överkalix	80.6	1.7	2,775	53.2	7.3	21.0	3.9	9.3	2.2	2.5	0.7	2,126	629	76.6	22.7	1,497
Övertorneå	80.5	2.1	3,357	39.6	12.7	22.0	8.3	11.6	1.4	2.7	1.6	2,159	1,144	64.3	34.1	1,015
Total	82.0	3.0	160,277	47.4	11.8	22.2	6.5	4.4	3.0	3.4	1.4	116,866	41,098	72.9	25.6	75,768
Source: SCB

=== Skåne ===
==== Malmö ====
Location	Turnout	Share	Votes	S	M	V	KD	C	FP	MP	Other	L-vote	R-vote	Left	Right	Margin
Location	%	%		%	%	%	%	%	%	%	%			%	%	
Malmö	77.3	100.0	140,635	41.9	27.7	8.6	7.6	1.1	3.5	3.5	6.0	76,039	56,168	54.1	39.9	19,871
Total	77.3	2.7	140,635	41.9	27.7	8.6	7.6	1.1	3.5	3.5	6.0	76,039	56,168	54.1	39.9	19,871
Source: SCB

==== Skåne NE ====
Location	Turnout	Share	Votes	S	M	V	KD	C	FP	MP	Other	L-vote	R-vote	Left	Right	Margin
Location	%	%		%	%	%	%	%	%	%	%			%	%	
Bromölla	80.3	4.2	7,180	51.7	13.4	15.8	7.6	3.3	2.9	3.3	2.0	5,081	1,954	70.8	27.2	3,127
Båstad	81.5	5.2	8,890	18.4	37.4	4.3	17.5	10.8	5.3	3.6	2.7	2,340	6,311	26.3	71.0	3,971
Hässleholm	79.4	17.0	29,025	34.4	21.8	9.6	15.2	8.3	3.4	4.2	3.1	13,995	14,137	48.2	48.7	142
Klippan	75.5	5.2	8,810	35.0	27.3	8.3	13.8	6.0	3.3	2.9	3.4	4,071	4,442	46.2	50.4	371
Kristianstad	79.8	25.5	43,548	38.5	25.4	8.8	11.4	4.4	4.8	4.0	2.8	22,339	19,995	51.3	45.9	2,344
Osby	80.6	4.6	7,789	42.9	17.1	10.7	12.4	7.8	3.4	4.1	1.7	4,496	3,162	57.7	40.6	1,334
Perstorp	77.0	2.3	3,859	37.0	22.8	11.6	11.7	5.3	3.8	2.4	5.4	1,969	1,680	51.0	43.5	289
Simrishamn	77.9	6.8	11,667	30.3	28.6	9.7	13.3	7.5	3.5	4.1	2.9	5,152	6,171	44.2	52.9	1,019
Tomelilla	75.6	4.1	7,015	33.9	25.5	7.7	12.1	11.1	3.0	3.6	3.0	3,179	3,626	45.3	51.7	447
Åstorp	77.6	4.1	7,053	44.4	23.3	9.8	10.5	3.8	3.0	2.4	2.7	3,993	2,869	56.6	40.7	1,124
Ängelholm	79.9	12.9	21,974	27.4	33.2	6.8	15.2	6.0	4.6	3.5	3.3	8,283	12,957	37.7	59.0	4,674
Örkelljunga	77.2	3.1	5,305	27.3	26.0	6.7	22.0	7.3	4.5	2.8	3.3	1,954	3,175	36.8	59.8	1,221
Östra Göinge	79.4	4.9	8,334	47.1	16.3	11.8	11.0	5.7	2.7	3.7	1.7	5,219	2,976	62.6	35.7	2,243
Total	79.1	3.2	170,449	35.4	25.3	9.0	13.3	6.4	4.0	3.7	2.9	82,071	83,455	48.1	49.0	1,384
Source: SCB

==== Skåne S ====
Location	Turnout	Share	Votes	S	M	V	KD	C	FP	MP	Other	L-vote	R-vote	Left	Right	Margin
Location	%	%		%	%	%	%	%	%	%	%			%	%	
Burlöv	82.7	4.4	8,432	50.2	23.3	7.4	6.5	2.3	3.5	3.0	3.6	5,121	3,010	60.7	35.7	2,111
Kävlinge	83.9	7.6	14,564	42.1	27.7	6.6	8.3	4.0	3.9	2.6	4.8	7,469	6,393	51.3	43.8	1,076
Lomma	88.1	6.0	11,499	31.1	38.8	3.6	11.8	2.5	5.4	3.1	3.9	4,340	6,716	37.7	58.4	2,376
Lund	84.9	31.8	61,190	29.2	31.2	9.6	8.9	3.2	9.5	6.1	2.3	27,513	32,254	45.0	52.7	4,741
Sjöbo	77.2	4.9	9,438	33.8	27.2	6.7	10.8	10.0	3.1	3.0	5.6	4,102	4,812	43.5	51.0	710
Skurup	77.2	3.9	7,553	36.8	26.0	6.7	9.8	9.8	3.2	3.4	4.3	3,546	3,685	46.9	48.8	139
Staffanstorp	86.4	6.2	11,909	38.6	32.1	5.2	9.6	3.6	4.0	2.6	4.2	5,528	5,877	46.4	49.3	349
Svedala	84.3	5.6	10,753	46.5	24.7	6.4	9.6	3.7	2.8	3.0	3.3	6,004	4,399	55.8	40.9	1,605
Trelleborg	80.6	11.5	22,235	45.8	22.1	7.0	9.6	3.6	2.4	2.9	6.5	12,393	8,391	55.7	37.7	4,002
Vellinge	88.1	10.1	19,503	24.6	50.0	2.4	10.8	2.5	3.8	1.8	4.1	5,619	13,089	28.8	67.1	7,470
Ystad	79.1	8.1	15,646	38.4	28.0	7.3	8.7	5.3	4.4	3.2	4.7	7,646	7,259	48.9	46.4	387
Total	83.5	3.7	192,722	35.5	30.9	7.0	9.4	4.0	5.5	3.8	3.9	89,281	95,885	46.3	49.8	6,604
Source: SCB

==== Skåne W ====
Location	Turnout	Share	Votes	S	M	V	KD	C	FP	MP	Other	L-vote	R-vote	Left	Right	Margin
Location	%	%		%	%	%	%	%	%	%	%			%	%	
Bjuv	78.5	5.1	7,643	49.3	19.2	10.3	8.6	3.9	3.0	2.2	3.5	4,725	2,651	61.8	34.7	2,074
Eslöv	79.6	10.8	16,101	43.7	21.5	7.9	9.0	8.5	3.1	3.2	3.1	8,833	6,762	54.9	42.0	2,071
Helsingborg	78.2	44.9	67,022	34.8	28.9	9.2	10.0	1.8	4.6	3.3	7.5	31,715	30,291	47.3	45.2	1,424
Höganäs	83.5	9.6	14,295	30.5	33.4	6.4	13.8	3.0	5.7	3.3	3.9	5,750	7,986	40.2	55.9	2,236
Hörby	78.6	5.3	7,952	30.3	23.5	5.6	15.2	13.3	3.7	4.3	4.1	3,199	4,423	40.2	55.6	1,224
Höör	79.3	5.2	7,763	31.8	25.9	7.0	11.6	6.9	3.3	5.2	8.3	3,412	3,705	44.0	47.7	293
Landskrona	79.6	14.2	21,183	43.9	25.0	8.2	6.6	2.1	3.8	2.9	7.5	11,638	7,951	54.9	37.5	3,687
Svalöv	80.2	4.9	7,327	38.9	22.8	6.4	9.6	12.7	3.1	2.9	3.5	3,533	3,534	48.2	48.2	1
Total	79.2	2.8	149,286	37.2	26.7	8.3	10.0	4.2	4.2	3.3	6.1	72,805	67,303	48.8	45.1	5,502
Source: SCB

=== Stockholm area ===
==== Stockholm ====
Location	Turnout	Share	Votes	S	M	V	KD	C	FP	MP	Other	L-vote	R-vote	Left	Right	Margin
Location	%	%		%	%	%	%	%	%	%	%			%	%	
Stockholm	81.0	100.0	438,295	27.2	33.7	12.9	8.9	1.7	7.5	5.6	2.5	200,295	227,219	45.7	51.8	26,924
Total	81.0	8.3	438,295	27.2	33.7	12.9	8.9	1.7	7.5	5.6	2.5	200,295	227,219	45.7	51.8	26,924
Source: SCB

==== Stockholm County ====
Location	Turnout	Share	Votes	S	M	V	KD	C	FP	MP	Other	L-vote	R-vote	Left	Right	Margin
Location	%	%		%	%	%	%	%	%	%	%			%	%	
Botkyrka	75.7	5.5	32,611	40.6	24.1	12.0	9.9	1.6	5.1	4.3	2.3	18,575	13,279	57.0	40.7	5,296
Danderyd	88.2	3.3	19,248	10.5	59.3	2.6	13.5	1.8	8.7	2.6	1.0	3,025	16,023	15.7	83.2	12,998
Ekerö	86.2	2.1	12,615	24.0	38.9	7.2	12.9	3.6	6.0	5.5	2.0	4,620	7,744	36.6	61.4	3,124
Haninge	79.8	6.0	35,549	38.2	25.6	11.6	9.8	2.0	4.3	4.6	3.9	19,320	14,849	54.3	41.8	4,471
Huddinge	81.0	7.3	42,829	34.0	30.7	11.0	10.0	1.7	5.5	4.2	2.9	21,071	20,498	49.2	47.9	573
Järfälla	83.8	5.9	34,666	33.8	30.3	9.5	11.7	1.7	6.1	4.5	2.3	16,583	17,294	47.8	49.9	711
Lidingö	86.5	4.4	25,765	15.4	50.7	4.6	12.9	2.0	9.3	3.5	1.5	6,069	19,317	23.6	75.0	13,248
Nacka	83.9	7.1	41,785	25.3	40.0	9.0	10.1	2.0	7.3	4.5	1.7	16,237	24,825	38.9	59.4	8,588
Norrtälje	79.9	5.1	29,828	34.7	25.4	9.7	11.4	7.8	3.8	4.5	2.7	14,589	14,433	48.9	48.4	156
Nykvarn	83.8	0.7	4,370	42.4	26.1	7.9	8.4	4.2	5.4	4.0	1.6	2,372	1,928	54.3	44.1	444
Nynäshamn	81.4	2.3	13,648	37.8	24.5	12.9	10.9	3.2	3.8	4.8	2.0	7,571	5,801	55.5	42.5	1,770
Salem	84.7	1.3	7,399	31.8	30.7	9.5	11.9	2.2	6.4	4.9	2.7	3,418	3,782	46.2	51.1	364
Sigtuna	78.9	3.1	18,156	33.5	31.0	9.6	11.1	3.2	4.3	3.7	3.6	8,491	9,010	46.8	49.6	519
Sollentuna	85.1	5.6	33,066	26.4	36.8	7.5	12.7	2.2	7.6	4.4	2.3	12,655	19,643	38.3	59.4	6,988
Solna	80.4	5.7	33,488	29.7	33.2	11.2	10.2	1.9	6.9	4.4	2.4	15,205	17,469	45.4	52.2	2,264
Sundbyberg	79.2	3.3	19,144	34.3	28.9	12.9	8.2	1.7	6.2	4.9	3.0	9,978	8,594	52.1	44.9	1,384
Södertälje	77.2	6.7	39,428	41.4	22.5	10.3	10.3	3.4	3.9	5.4	2.8	22,520	15,798	57.1	40.1	6,722
Tyresö	84.5	3.7	21,460	32.3	33.5	9.6	10.2	1.8	5.7	4.8	2.0	10,022	11,001	46.7	51.3	979
Täby	87.5	6.4	37,476	18.2	49.8	4.3	12.8	1.7	8.7	3.0	1.5	9,543	27,364	25.5	73.0	17,821
Upplands-Bro	81.6	1.9	11,033	36.4	27.1	11.2	12.6	2.2	4.5	4.0	2.0	5,689	5,121	51.6	46.4	568
Upplands Väsby	80.1	3.4	19,768	34.6	29.9	10.4	9.8	2.2	5.2	4.6	3.2	9,824	9,307	49.7	47.1	517
Vallentuna	83.6	2.3	13,705	26.7	35.4	7.7	13.3	4.4	5.5	4.9	2.1	5,391	8,021	39.3	58.5	2,630
Vaxholm	85.8	0.9	5,279	24.1	39.5	7.8	12.5	3.2	6.3	5.3	1.3	1,965	3,243	37.2	61.4	1,278
Värmdö	84.0	2.8	16,483	30.4	36.1	10.7	9.7	2.5	4.6	4.5	1.6	7,498	8,722	45.5	52.9	1,224
Österåker	83.8	3.3	19,133	28.4	36.4	8.1	13.0	2.4	5.5	4.4	1.9	7,816	10,962	40.9	57.3	3,146
Total	82.1	11.2	587,932	30.6	33.8	9.2	11.1	2.5	6.0	4.4	2.4	260,047	314,028	44.2	53.4	53,981
Source: SCB

=== Södermanland ===
Location	Turnout	Share	Votes	S	M	V	KD	C	FP	MP	Other	L-vote	R-vote	Left	Right	Margin
Location	%	%		%	%	%	%	%	%	%	%			%	%	
Eskilstuna	79.7	33.2	50,641	44.9	18.9	11.5	10.0	3.5	4.3	4.8	2.1	31,012	18,584	61.2	36.7	12,428
Flen	81.4	6.5	9,924	43.3	17.6	12.1	11.2	6.8	2.7	4.9	1.6	5,972	3,798	60.2	38.3	2,174
Gnesta	81.3	3.7	5,634	34.1	20.8	10.0	13.0	10.7	3.4	6.8	1.1	2,865	2,707	50.9	48.0	158
Katrineholm	83.5	13.1	20,002	47.4	16.4	9.8	9.6	5.5	4.0	5.4	2.0	12,511	7,100	62.5	35.5	5,411
Nyköping	83.7	20.1	30,627	43.2	18.8	10.6	12.3	5.5	4.0	4.1	1.5	17,739	12,429	57.9	40.6	5,310
Oxelösund	83.2	4.5	6,891	55.2	12.1	14.8	7.7	2.1	2.9	3.7	1.5	5,078	1,708	73.7	24.8	3,370
Strängnäs	81.4	11.1	16,902	35.5	27.7	9.2	12.2	4.2	5.6	4.2	1.4	8,279	8,393	49.0	49.7	114
Trosa	83.8	3.9	5,977	34.7	26.4	8.8	14.3	4.1	4.6	5.3	1.7	2,921	2,953	48.9	49.4	32
Vingåker	83.9	3.9	5,875	44.8	15.0	10.4	10.5	6.7	3.2	8.4	1.1	3,734	2,079	63.6	35.4	1,655
Total	81.8	2.9	152,473	43.4	19.3	10.8	10.9	4.8	4.1	4.9	1.7	90,111	59,751	59.1	39.2	30,360
Source: SCB

=== Uppsala ===
Location	Turnout	Share	Votes	S	M	V	KD	C	FP	MP	Other	L-vote	R-vote	Left	Right	Margin
Location	%	%		%	%	%	%	%	%	%	%			%	%	
Enköping	81.6	12.5	21,320	36.4	25.4	8.1	11.7	9.7	3.2	4.3	1.2	10,386	10,676	48.7	50.1	290
Håbo	81.4	5.6	9,503	33.9	34.1	7.5	11.6	3.2	3.7	3.9	2.2	4,301	4,997	45.3	52.6	696
Tierp	81.3	7.1	12,096	48.4	12.4	10.5	9.3	10.8	3.1	3.9	1.6	7,597	4,300	62.8	35.5	3,297
Uppsala	82.3	64.1	109,076	30.4	25.2	11.6	11.0	4.4	7.9	6.6	2.8	53,073	52,907	48.7	48.5	166
Älvkarleby	81.7	3.2	5,460	56.8	10.4	16.8	5.6	2.2	3.3	3.3	1.6	4,200	1,174	76.9	21.5	3,026
Östhammar	80.0	7.4	12,641	42.5	18.4	10.5	8.8	9.8	3.3	4.1	2.5	7,224	5,098	57.1	40.3	2,126
Total	81.9	3.2	170,096	34.4	23.8	10.9	10.7	5.8	6.2	5.7	2.4	86,781	79,152	51.0	46.5	7,629
Source: SCB

=== Värmland ===
Location	Turnout	Share	Votes	S	M	V	KD	C	FP	MP	Other	L-vote	R-vote	Left	Right	Margin
Location	%	%		%	%	%	%	%	%	%	%			%	%	
Arvika	77.3	9.1	15,424	41.2	16.0	14.4	11.7	6.4	4.2	5.3	0.9	9,386	5,900	60.9	38.3	3,486
Eda	78.2	2.8	4,736	44.5	14.6	14.1	10.5	9.8	2.5	3.4	0.6	2,933	1,773	61.9	37.4	1,160
Filipstad	78.6	4.3	7,353	50.3	12.3	20.2	6.3	3.5	3.4	2.9	1.1	5,396	1,878	73.4	25.5	3,518
Forshaga	82.6	4.2	7,086	48.7	15.6	13.3	9.0	5.3	3.1	3.8	1.2	4,658	2,344	65.7	33.1	2,314
Grums	78.7	3.4	5,807	50.9	12.7	14.6	9.4	6.5	2.1	2.8	1.0	3,965	1,785	68.3	30.7	2,180
Hagfors	82.6	5.5	9,411	51.7	9.4	20.7	6.8	6.5	1.7	2.7	0.6	7,062	2,295	75.0	24.4	4,767
Hammarö	85.2	5.1	8,643	43.7	21.4	13.7	10.0	2.0	3.8	4.1	1.3	5,316	3,216	61.5	37.2	2,100
Karlstad	82.8	29.6	50,206	36.4	23.2	12.7	12.0	4.1	4.7	4.9	1.9	27,136	22,126	54.0	44.1	5,010
Kil	81.9	4.2	7,088	37.2	19.8	12.2	13.1	7.7	4.2	4.5	1.3	3,819	3,174	53.9	44.8	645
Kristinehamn	81.8	9.2	15,677	42.7	16.6	15.5	10.1	5.0	4.5	3.9	1.7	9,733	5,679	62.1	36.2	4,054
Munkfors	81.3	1.6	2,798	57.1	8.1	16.4	6.1	5.7	2.9	2.3	1.2	2,124	640	75.9	22.9	1,484
Storfors	83.5	1.8	2,995	47.8	15.2	16.7	8.1	5.5	2.8	3.0	0.9	2,022	946	67.5	31.6	1,076
Sunne	80.0	4.9	8,272	32.2	20.9	9.6	11.5	16.2	4.0	4.2	1.5	3,806	4,346	46.0	52.5	540
Säffle	79.7	6.1	10,338	38.2	17.8	11.2	13.8	11.7	3.3	3.3	0.9	5,445	4,805	52.7	46.5	640
Torsby	80.5	5.2	8,798	42.1	19.4	17.2	6.7	8.4	2.1	3.3	0.8	5,509	3,218	62.6	36.6	2,291
Årjäng	72.3	3.0	5,091	29.7	17.0	9.5	16.7	10.4	12.5	3.3	0.8	2,168	2,883	42.6	56.6	715
Total	81.0	3.2	169,723	41.1	18.4	14.1	10.7	6.4	4.0	4.1	1.3	100,478	67,008	59.2	39.5	33,470
Source: SCB

=== Västerbotten ===
Location	Turnout	Share	Votes	S	M	V	KD	C	FP	MP	Other	L-vote	R-vote	Left	Right	Margin
Location	%	%		%	%	%	%	%	%	%	%			%	%	
Bjurholm	80.8	1.1	1,776	36.4	19.0	5.5	13.7	11.3	10.4	2.3	1.4	785	967	44.2	54.4	182
Dorotea	81.2	1.4	2,157	50.2	7.0	16.7	7.2	7.2	6.5	2.7	2.5	1,501	602	69.6	27.9	899
Lycksele	81.2	5.2	8,261	44.8	9.5	16.7	13.1	3.7	7.4	3.1	1.6	5,334	2,793	64.6	33.8	2,541
Malå	84.2	1.6	2,487	45.0	10.7	23.2	7.8	4.0	4.5	2.7	2.2	1,763	670	70.9	26.9	1,093
Nordmaling	81.0	3.0	4,776	43.3	12.0	11.9	11.9	10.7	5.8	2.7	1.7	2,767	1,929	57.9	40.4	838
Norsjö	82.5	1.9	3,070	40.8	8.5	18.1	12.7	11.5	4.2	2.2	1.9	1,878	1,133	61.2	36.9	745
Robertsfors	83.0	2.8	4,459	36.7	10.9	11.8	12.2	19.1	5.0	3.7	0.7	2,331	2,098	52.3	47.1	233
Skellefteå	83.0	29.4	46,467	48.8	9.1	15.5	10.2	6.2	4.8	4.0	1.5	31,683	14,103	68.2	30.4	17,580
Sorsele	76.0	1.2	1,930	41.7	10.8	14.7	12.4	6.2	3.9	6.2	4.2	1,207	642	62.5	33.3	565
Storuman	76.6	2.7	4,260	37.7	12.9	15.5	14.5	6.6	5.2	3.6	4.1	2,419	1,665	56.8	39.1	754
Umeå	82.7	39.3	62,030	39.7	14.6	16.6	10.1	4.9	5.8	6.9	1.4	39,239	21,934	63.3	35.4	17,305
Vilhelmina	79.3	3.1	4,887	46.8	7.8	17.4	11.3	5.6	4.8	2.9	3.4	3,279	1,443	67.1	29.5	1,836
Vindeln	79.3	2.4	3,796	35.8	13.7	9.9	15.0	12.9	6.8	4.0	2.1	1,883	1,834	49.6	48.3	49
Vännäs	80.1	3.2	5,041	42.2	9.9	15.7	10.5	13.0	3.7	3.7	1.3	3,102	1,872	61.5	37.1	1,230
Åsele	81.2	1.5	2,442	50.5	9.1	11.8	8.4	10.6	3.6	2.6	3.4	1,584	775	64.9	31.7	809
Total	82.1	3.0	157,839	43.2	11.7	15.7	10.7	6.6	5.4	4.9	1.7	100,755	54,460	63.8	34.5	46,295
Source: SCB

=== Västernorrland ===
Location	Turnout	Share	Votes	S	M	V	KD	C	FP	MP	Other	L-vote	R-vote	Left	Right	Margin
Location	%	%		%	%	%	%	%	%	%	%			%	%	
Härnösand	81.3	10.5	16,520	40.1	17.7	13.3	10.9	7.0	3.9	5.5	1.5	9,747	6,525	59.0	39.5	3,222
Kramfors	82.1	9.1	14,324	48.2	10.5	15.5	8.2	10.5	2.1	3.4	1.5	9,617	4,488	67.1	31.3	5,129
Sollefteå	81.8	9.2	14,566	50.2	10.6	16.5	7.8	6.7	1.9	3.7	2.5	10,261	3,934	70.4	27.0	6,327
Sundsvall	81.4	37.0	58,440	42.2	16.7	15.2	9.8	4.5	4.7	4.6	2.4	36,206	20,830	62.0	35.6	15,376
Timrå	80.9	7.1	11,200	49.3	9.0	19.1	7.7	6.3	2.8	3.5	2.2	8,049	2,902	71.9	25.9	5,147
Ånge	79.3	4.5	7,112	46.0	10.6	18.1	8.5	8.6	2.0	4.3	1.9	4,866	2,111	68.4	29.7	2,755
Örnsköldsvik	82.2	22.6	35,730	47.5	11.5	11.7	13.4	8.2	3.5	3.1	1.2	22,230	13,067	62.2	36.6	9,163
Total	81.6	3.0	157,892	45.1	13.7	14.8	10.2	6.6	3.6	4.1	1.9	100,976	53,857	64.0	34.1	47,119
Source: SCB

=== Västmanland ===
Location	Turnout	Share	Votes	S	M	V	KD	C	FP	MP	Other	L-vote	R-vote	Left	Right	Margin
Location	%	%		%	%	%	%	%	%	%	%			%	%	
Arboga	82.0	5.7	8,589	41.9	17.9	13.5	10.7	5.2	4.1	5.9	0.8	5,273	3,245	61.4	37.8	2,028
Fagersta	79.8	5.1	7,740	47.9	15.5	18.9	7.8	2.7	3.1	3.1	1.0	5,411	2,248	69.9	29.0	3,163
Hallstahammar	79.5	5.8	8,745	49.7	14.0	16.2	8.3	3.7	3.3	3.6	1.1	6,084	2,562	69.6	29.3	3,522
Heby	82.3	5.3	8,028	37.4	15.7	12.3	12.2	14.5	2.6	4.0	1.2	4,312	3,621	53.7	45.1	691
Kungsör	81.9	3.2	4,892	39.7	19.0	13.6	10.7	7.2	3.9	4.4	1.5	2,826	1,991	57.8	40.7	835
Köping	79.3	9.7	14,575	44.1	16.0	16.2	9.6	5.6	3.2	3.5	1.8	9,301	5,009	63.8	34.4	4,292
Norberg	82.6	2.5	3,756	42.4	13.7	25.2	6.0	4.9	2.7	4.0	1.2	2,689	1,023	71.6	27.2	1,666
Sala	80.4	8.5	12,853	36.0	19.0	11.2	12.9	10.6	3.8	5.4	1.1	6,756	5,952	52.6	46.3	804
Skinnskatteberg	81.1	1.9	2,876	48.3	11.6	17.7	8.2	6.8	2.1	4.3	1.1	2,021	823	70.3	28.6	1,198
Surahammar	80.3	3.9	5,949	51.7	11.8	18.2	7.5	2.7	3.5	3.6	1.2	4,367	1,511	73.4	25.4	2,856
Västerås	80.2	48.2	72,606	38.7	24.0	11.1	11.8	2.5	5.8	4.5	1.6	39,400	32,011	54.3	44.1	7,389
Total	80.4	2.9	150,609	41.1	19.9	13.3	10.8	4.7	4.5	4.3	1.4	88,440	59,996	58.7	39.8	28,444
Source: SCB

=== Västra Götaland ===
==== Gothenburg ====
Location	Turnout	Share	Votes	S	M	V	KD	C	FP	MP	Other	L-vote	R-vote	Left	Right	Margin
Location	%	%		%	%	%	%	%	%	%	%			%	%	
Gothenburg	78.9	100.0	263,181	29.3	25.8	14.9	12.0	1.7	6.6	5.7	3.9	131,561	121,481	50.0	46.2	10,080
Total	78.9	5.0	263,181	29.3	25.8	14.9	12.0	1.7	6.6	5.7	3.9	131,561	121,481	50.0	46.2	10,080
Source: SCB

==== Västra Götaland E ====
Location	Turnout	Share	Votes	S	M	V	KD	C	FP	MP	Other	L-vote	R-vote	Left	Right	Margin
Location	%	%		%	%	%	%	%	%	%	%			%	%	
Essunga	82.6	2.3	3,571	29.2	23.2	7.8	15.0	15.7	3.1	4.1	1.9	1,468	2,035	41.1	57.0	567
Falköping	81.7	12.2	19,158	32.7	19.3	10.4	18.5	9.7	3.2	4.4	1.7	9,102	9,722	47.5	50.7	620
Grästorp	82.4	2.3	3,612	28.8	24.6	8.6	16.9	13.0	3.8	3.0	1.4	1,456	2,104	40.3	58.3	648
Gullspång	82.4	2.4	3,719	37.1	16.6	14.7	13.6	8.7	1.9	5.6	1.7	2,135	1,519	57.4	40.8	616
Götene	84.2	5.2	8,206	35.6	16.7	11.9	17.4	9.1	3.8	4.0	1.5	4,226	3,861	51.5	47.1	365
Hjo	83.7	3.6	5,609	32.3	20.6	11.3	18.5	6.4	5.4	4.2	1.4	2,680	2,851	47.8	50.8	171
Karlsborg	83.5	3.0	4,692	40.2	17.1	10.3	16.5	6.8	3.9	3.5	1.6	2,535	2,081	54.0	44.4	454
Lidköping	82.8	14.6	22,775	38.3	17.4	13.2	14.3	6.9	4.1	3.8	2.1	12,590	9,708	55.3	42.6	2,882
Mariestad	80.3	9.2	14,414	39.5	17.7	13.5	15.3	5.0	3.5	4.0	1.5	8,212	5,980	57.0	41.5	2,232
Skara	81.5	7.1	11,182	37.8	21.1	10.6	13.2	7.4	4.2	4.5	1.3	5,906	5,131	52.8	45.9	775
Skövde	81.7	18.8	29,456	36.5	21.9	10.5	15.0	6.3	4.3	3.9	1.6	15,003	13,968	50.9	47.4	1,035
Tibro	83.0	4.2	6,602	37.5	16.6	12.2	17.7	6.7	4.7	3.7	1.0	3,523	3,014	53.4	45.7	509
Tidaholm	82.8	5.1	7,905	44.8	13.5	11.8	14.6	6.1	4.6	3.0	1.8	4,707	3,059	59.5	38.7	1,648
Töreboda	78.8	3.6	5,685	35.1	17.0	11.9	14.5	12.7	2.6	4.4	1.8	2,920	2,662	51.4	46.8	258
Vara	80.4	6.3	9,806	27.7	25.2	7.9	16.3	14.1	3.1	3.3	2.4	3,813	5,755	38.9	58.7	1,942
Total	81.9	3.0	156,392	36.1	19.3	11.3	15.7	8.1	3.9	4.0	1.7	80,276	73,450	51.3	47.0	6,826
Source: SCB

==== Västra Götaland N ====
Location	Turnout	Share	Votes	S	M	V	KD	C	FP	MP	Other	L-vote	R-vote	Left	Right	Margin
Location	%	%		%	%	%	%	%	%	%	%			%	%	
Ale	82.7	9.3	14,602	39.7	16.7	15.9	13.3	4.9	3.4	4.4	1.6	8,772	5,600	60.1	38.4	3,172
Alingsås	84.6	13.7	21,521	30.8	19.6	13.1	18.2	4.6	5.8	5.9	1.9	10,736	10,382	49.9	48.2	354
Bengtsfors	79.1	4.2	6,624	41.5	16.0	10.5	14.1	9.5	3.5	3.8	1.1	3,697	2,854	55.8	43.1	843
Dals-Ed	79.0	1.9	2,913	30.7	15.6	8.3	20.4	15.2	3.1	4.9	1.8	1,280	1,580	43.9	54.2	300
Färgelanda	80.9	2.7	4,227	37.0	14.1	9.6	13.2	17.4	3.9	2.9	2.0	2,091	2,051	49.5	48.5	40
Herrljunga	83.8	3.7	5,828	28.8	16.4	9.5	19.8	13.6	5.2	4.6	2.2	2,497	3,204	42.8	55.0	707
Lerum	86.0	13.3	20,971	28.4	25.2	12.4	17.5	2.9	5.9	5.6	2.2	9,711	10,797	46.3	51.5	1,086
Lilla Edet	80.3	4.6	7,261	40.6	13.2	16.8	11.3	7.8	3.0	4.4	2.8	4,491	2,569	61.9	35.4	1,922
Mellerud	79.7	3.8	5,975	30.8	17.8	9.6	16.0	13.5	3.2	5.4	3.6	2,739	3,019	45.8	50.5	280
Trollhättan	82.4	19.7	31,041	44.1	16.6	13.4	11.0	3.5	4.0	4.4	3.0	19,217	10,906	61.9	35.1	8,311
Vårgårda	82.7	4.0	6,343	27.2	15.0	10.3	24.9	11.3	4.4	5.4	1.5	2,721	3,525	42.9	55.6	804
Vänersborg	82.2	14.1	22,198	37.3	16.8	13.7	14.7	6.7	4.0	4.7	2.1	12,350	9,377	55.6	42.2	2,973
Åmål	79.2	5.0	7,788	41.6	16.0	12.2	13.3	7.6	3.3	4.4	1.7	4,531	3,125	58.2	40.1	1,406
Total	82.6	3.0	157,292	36.2	17.9	12.9	15.1	6.5	4.4	4.8	2.2	84,833	68,989	53.9	43.9	15,844
Source: SCB

==== Västra Götaland S ====
Location	Turnout	Share	Votes	S	M	V	KD	C	FP	MP	Other	L-vote	R-vote	Left	Right	Margin
Location	%	%		%	%	%	%	%	%	%	%			%	%	
Bollebygd	86.5	4.4	4,869	34.0	23.2	10.6	15.7	6.6	2.8	5.2	1.9	2,423	2,355	49.8	48.4	68
Borås	82.1	52.2	57,345	37.1	21.3	13.0	14.5	3.9	4.2	4.7	1.5	31,360	25,130	54.7	43.8	6,230
Mark	82.8	18.1	19,867	38.6	16.7	12.7	14.9	9.2	2.4	4.3	1.2	11,053	8,580	55.6	43.2	2,473
Svenljunga	81.1	5.8	6,398	34.2	20.4	8.7	16.3	12.1	3.6	3.7	1.1	2,980	3,348	46.6	52.3	368
Tranemo	84.5	6.7	7,385	38.0	18.9	7.0	13.6	13.9	3.5	4.5	0.7	3,654	3,681	49.5	49.8	27
Ulricehamn	83.6	12.7	13,929	30.3	19.9	8.4	19.5	11.6	3.7	5.2	1.4	6,119	7,610	43.9	54.6	1,491
Total	82.7	2.1	109,793	36.2	20.2	11.6	15.3	7.1	3.6	4.6	1.4	57,589	50,704	52.5	46.2	6,885
Source: SCB

==== Västra Götaland W ====
Location	Turnout	Share	Votes	S	M	V	KD	C	FP	MP	Other	L-vote	R-vote	Left	Right	Margin
Location	%	%		%	%	%	%	%	%	%	%			%	%	
Härryda	84.8	8.9	17,068	31.6	25.2	11.3	14.0	3.2	6.2	4.8	3.7	8,131	8,300	47.6	48.6	169
Kungälv	84.9	11.7	22,450	34.6	22.0	11.2	15.6	5.4	4.6	4.5	2.0	11,289	10,701	50.3	47.7	588
Lysekil	82.0	4.8	9,266	46.0	16.0	12.3	9.4	3.5	6.4	5.0	1.3	5,869	3,273	63.3	35.2	2,596
Munkedal	79.5	3.3	6,289	36.0	15.3	12.3	15.3	11.5	2.9	4.2	2.5	3,304	2,830	52.5	45.0	474
Mölndal	83.1	17.1	32,808	31.5	23.4	11.8	13.4	2.4	6.6	4.2	6.7	15,583	15,025	47.5	45.8	558
Orust	81.4	4.7	9,090	31.2	21.0	12.6	16.1	7.5	5.2	4.1	2.2	4,351	4,536	47.9	49.9	185
Partille	83.5	9.8	18,861	30.8	24.5	12.5	15.4	1.6	6.6	4.4	4.2	8,994	9,072	47.7	48.1	78
Sotenäs	81.2	3.1	5,981	37.5	23.8	8.4	14.8	3.8	5.9	3.9	1.8	2,984	2,889	49.9	48.3	95
Stenungsund	82.1	6.1	11,750	33.6	23.1	11.4	15.0	4.4	5.9	4.3	2.4	5,784	5,682	49.2	48.4	102
Strömstad	74.4	3.0	5,757	37.3	19.7	9.7	11.9	9.9	4.7	5.3	1.5	3,013	2,656	52.3	46.1	357
Tanum	78.0	3.6	6,966	25.9	21.4	9.5	15.2	14.5	5.7	6.0	1.7	2,885	3,961	41.4	56.9	1,076
Tjörn	83.1	4.6	8,811	25.5	23.2	7.6	26.1	2.8	7.6	3.8	3.4	3,250	5,263	36.9	59.7	2,013
Uddevalla	82.4	15.5	29,741	39.9	17.0	13.3	13.1	4.3	4.1	4.4	3.8	17,158	11,452	57.7	38.5	5,706
Öckerö	84.9	3.8	7,221	26.1	22.3	9.1	29.2	1.3	5.5	4.5	2.0	2,865	4,213	39.7	58.3	1,348
Total	82.6	3.7	192,059	33.7	21.5	11.5	15.2	4.4	5.6	4.5	3.5	95,460	89,853	49.7	46.8	5,607
Source: SCB

=== Örebro ===
Location	Turnout	Share	Votes	S	M	V	KD	C	FP	MP	Other	L-vote	R-vote	Left	Right	Margin
Location	%	%		%	%	%	%	%	%	%	%			%	%	
Askersund	81.8	4.4	7,273	42.5	15.8	12.8	11.5	8.5	3.5	3.6	1.9	4,285	2,851	58.9	39.2	1,434
Degerfors	83.4	4.1	6,847	54.8	8.7	17.7	7.5	4.5	2.3	3.4	1.1	5,197	1,575	75.9	23.0	3,622
Hallsberg	83.0	5.9	9,862	46.3	13.4	13.9	10.5	6.5	3.4	4.0	2.0	6,334	3,330	64.2	33.8	3,004
Hällefors	79.9	3.0	5,022	54.6	10.7	17.6	5.6	3.4	3.3	3.9	0.8	3,828	1,153	76.2	23.0	2,675
Karlskoga	81.0	11.9	19,766	47.2	17.3	14.8	9.2	2.2	3.4	2.9	2.9	12,835	6,353	64.9	32.1	6,482
Kumla	82.8	6.9	11,489	43.6	15.9	13.0	12.1	5.9	4.2	3.3	2.0	6,885	4,376	59.9	38.1	2,509
Laxå	80.7	2.4	4,057	46.4	11.4	15.0	12.4	4.9	3.4	3.5	3.1	2,632	1,301	64.9	32.1	1,331
Lekeberg	82.5	2.6	4,264	32.7	16.7	10.7	15.9	14.0	3.7	4.4	1.9	2,038	2,146	47.8	50.3	108
Lindesberg	80.3	8.6	14,382	41.1	15.6	13.7	11.5	8.6	3.1	4.5	1.8	8,526	5,590	59.3	38.9	2,936
Ljusnarsberg	76.4	2.1	3,429	47.7	10.7	19.7	7.8	6.4	2.1	4.1	1.5	2,453	926	71.5	27.0	1,527
Nora	81.4	3.8	6,332	42.1	16.2	14.1	11.4	5.7	4.5	4.2	1.7	3,826	2,399	60.4	37.9	1,427
Örebro	82.4	44.3	73,648	38.0	19.2	12.5	12.3	3.8	6.5	5.1	2.6	40,975	30,782	55.6	41.8	10,193
Total	81.9	3.2	166,371	42.1	16.7	13.6	11.3	5.0	4.8	4.3	2.3	99,814	62,782	60.0	37.7	37,032
Source: SCB

=== Östergötland ===
Location	Turnout	Share	Votes	S	M	V	KD	C	FP	MP	Other	L-vote	R-vote	Left	Right	Margin
Location	%	%		%	%	%	%	%	%	%	%			%	%	
Boxholm	84.0	1.4	3,396	44.6	11.2	14.2	13.1	9.9	2.0	3.9	1.0	2,128	1,233	62.7	36.3	895
Finspång	84.3	5.5	13,830	46.2	14.9	14.5	11.4	4.4	2.9	4.0	1.6	8,956	4,650	64.8	33.6	4,306
Kinda	82.8	2.5	6,239	34.7	16.0	9.4	18.3	13.2	2.7	4.1	1.7	3,004	3,131	48.1	50.2	127
Linköping	83.8	32.8	81,832	32.7	25.6	10.0	14.3	4.1	5.5	5.1	2.6	39,095	40,606	47.8	49.6	1,511
Mjölby	82.4	6.3	15,673	40.9	18.8	11.9	13.3	6.6	3.1	3.7	1.7	8,863	6,544	56.5	41.8	2,319
Motala	81.8	10.1	25,206	44.2	16.6	13.1	12.0	4.4	3.3	4.6	1.8	15,606	9,147	61.9	36.3	6,459
Norrköping	80.1	28.5	71,096	37.3	23.9	11.6	11.2	3.2	3.1	5.2	4.5	38,379	29,495	54.0	41.5	8,884
Söderköping	83.1	3.3	8,362	31.6	26.3	8.9	13.8	9.5	2.7	5.0	2.3	3,804	4,366	45.5	52.2	562
Vadstena	84.1	2.0	4,936	36.4	21.4	9.6	15.4	6.3	3.7	5.1	2.1	2,522	2,311	51.1	46.8	211
Valdemarsvik	81.8	2.1	5,306	39.5	18.4	9.2	11.6	14.0	1.7	3.7	1.9	2,781	2,426	52.4	45.7	355
Ydre	86.3	1.1	2,681	28.3	15.0	7.3	25.7	14.2	2.9	4.7	1.8	1,082	1,552	40.4	57.9	470
Åtvidaberg	84.5	3.1	7,639	45.1	15.3	11.4	12.4	7.5	2.4	3.9	1.9	4,618	2,874	60.5	37.6	1,744
Ödeshög	83.5	1.4	3,561	33.5	17.3	8.6	19.5	12.0	2.6	4.8	1.6	1,673	1,831	47.0	51.4	158
Total	82.4	4.7	249,757	37.2	22.0	11.1	13.1	5.1	3.8	4.8	2.8	132,511	110,166	53.1	44.1	22,345
Source: SCB
