= Perstorp Municipality =

Perstorp Municipality Perstorps kommun
- Municipality
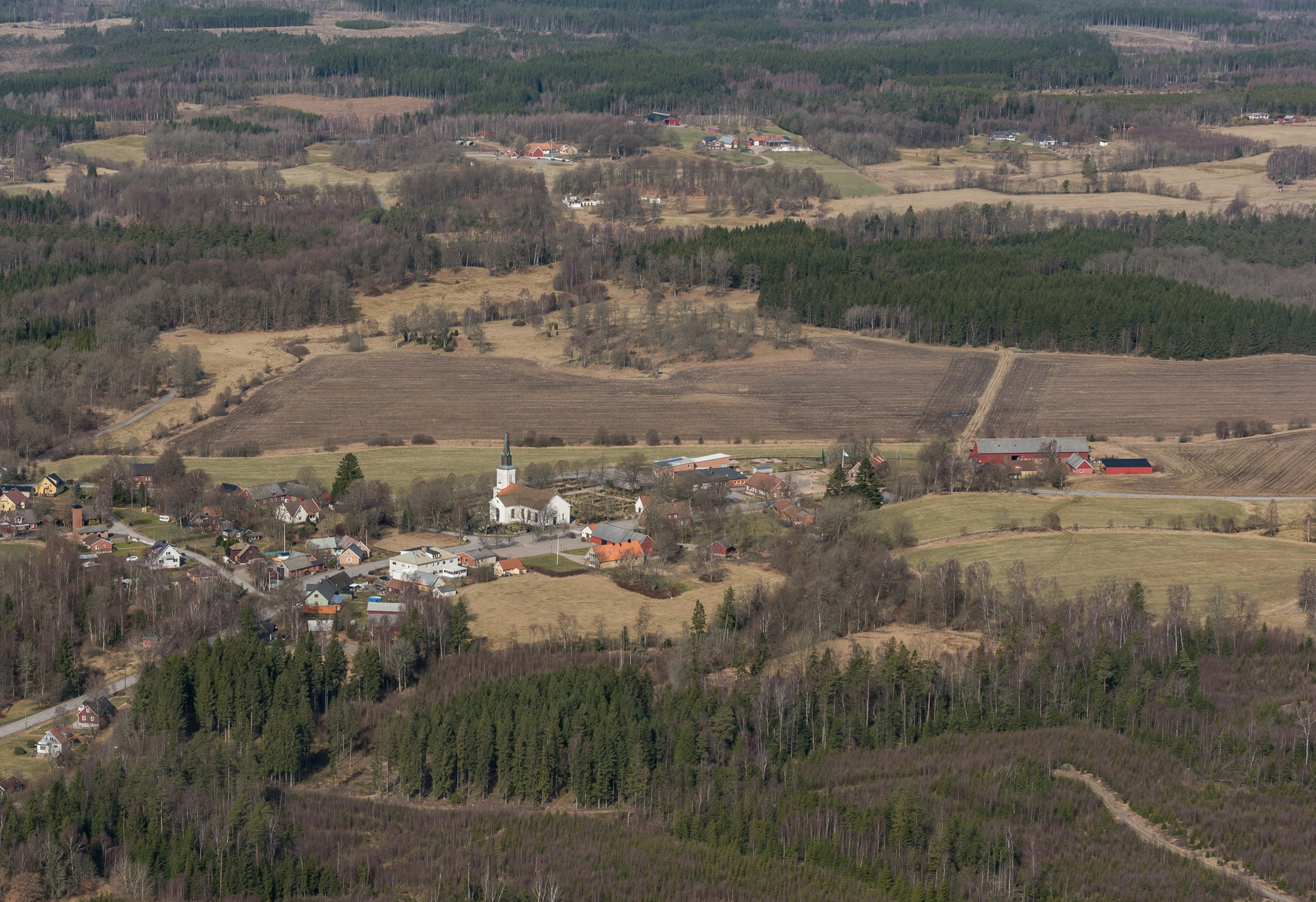

- Coat of arms

- Coordinates: 56°08′N 13°23′E
- Country: Sweden
- County: Skåne County
- Seat: Perstorp

Area
  - Total: 161.92 km^{2} (62.52 sq mi)
  - Land: 158.78 km^{2} (61.31 sq mi)
  - Water: 3.14 km^{2} (1.21 sq mi)
- Area as of 1 January 2014.

Population (30 June 2025)
  - Total: 7,219
  - Density: 45.47/km^{2} (117.8/sq mi)
- Time zone: UTC+1 (CET)
  - Summer (DST): UTC+2 (CEST)
- ISO 3166 code: SE
- Province: Scania
- Municipal code: 1275
- Website: www.perstorp.se

Perstorp Municipality (Swedish: Perstorps kommun) is a municipality in Skåne County in southern Sweden. Its seat is located in the town Perstorp.

Perstorp was made a market town (köping) in 1947. It was amalgamated with Oderljunga in the first of the two nationwide local government reforms (1952). The reform of 1971 did not bring any new amalgamations, but the köping status was abolished.

== Locality ==
There is only one urban area (also called a Tätort or locality) in Perstorp Municipality, the municipal seat Perstorp, with a population of 5,468 (2005).

The name Perstorp is perhaps most known by the company Perstorp AB, based in the municipality, employing 1,800 people worldwide. They are producing chemicals market and materials technology. They are also known for a subsidiary called Perstorp Flooring, producing laminate and plastic floor material.

== Demographics ==
This is a demographic table based on Perstorp Municipality's electoral districts in the 2022 Swedish general election sourced from SVT's election platform, in turn taken from SCB official statistics.

In total there were 7,541 residents, including 5,143 Swedish citizens of voting age. 36.1% voted for the left coalition and 62.9% for the right coalition. Indicators are in percentage points except population totals and income. The district of Oderljunga saw the Sweden Democrats receive 53% of the vote, the party's highest share in any electoral district in the country.

Location	Residents	Citizen adults	Left vote	Right vote	Employed	Swedish parents	Foreign heritage	Income SEK	Degree
Location			%	%					
Centrum/Norra	1,690	1,171	39.3	59.8	67	61	39	18,847	24
Oderljunga	1,044	785	25.0	74.5	81	87	13	24,684	26
Södra	1,585	1,057	39.4	60.0	68	66	34	20,762	23
Västra	1,760	1,087	41.0	57.9	63	57	43	19,603	24
Östra	1,462	1,043	35.0	63.6	75	71	29	22,384	30
Source: SVT
