= Åsbo Southern Hundred =

Geographic division in Sweden

Coat of arms

Åsbo Southern Hundred (Swedish: Södra Åsbo härad) was a hundred of Skåne in Sweden. Until The Treaty of Roskilde in 1658, it was in Denmark.

== See also ==
- Åsbo Northern Hundred divided between Halland and Skåne
- List of hundreds of Sweden
