= Åsbo Northern Hundred =

Historic geographic subdivision in Sweden

Coat of arms

Åsbo Northern Hundred (Swedish: Norra Åsbo härad) was a hundred in Skåne in Sweden. Until the Treaty of Roskilde in 1658, it was Danish.

== See also ==
- Åsbo Southern Hundred in Skåne
- List of hundreds of Sweden
