= Results of the 1973 Swedish general election =

1973 Swedish general election results

Sweden held a general election on the 16 September 1973. Results are published by the Statistical Central Bureau.

== National results ==
Party	Votes	%	Seats			
Party	Votes	%	Con.	Lev.	Tot.	+/–
Swedish Social Democratic Party	2,247,727	43.56	146	10	156	–7
Centre Party	1,295,246	25.10	80	10	90	+19
Moderate Party	737,584	14.29	47	4	51	+10
People's Party	486,028	9.42	27	7	34	–24
Left Party Communists	274,929	5.33	10	9	19	+2
Christian Democratic Unity	90,388	1.75	0	0	0	0
Communist Party	18,923	0.37	0	0	0	0
Communist League Marxist-Leninist (Revolutionaries)	8,014	0.16	0	0	0	New
Other parties	1,307	0.03	0	0	0	0
Total	5,160,146	100.00	310	40	350	0
Valid votes	5,160,146	99.83				
Invalid/blank votes	8,850	0.17				
Total votes	5,168,996	100.00				
Registered voters/turnout	5,690,333	90.84				
Source: Nohlen & Stöver

== Results by region ==
=== By percentage share ===
Location	Turnout	Share	Votes	S	C	M	FP	VPK	KDS	Other	Left	Right	Margin
Götaland	91.1	48.1	2,482,430	41.6	27.2	15.2	9.9	3.8	1.9	0.4	45.4	52.3	169,767
Svealand	90.7	37.1	1,915,514	43.8	22.3	15.8	9.7	6.4	1.3	0.7	50.2	47.8	45,561
Norrland	90.3	14.8	762,202	49.4	25.4	7.6	7.2	7.5	2.3	0.6	56.9	40.2	128,004
Total	90.8	100.0	5,160,146	43.6	25.1	14.3	9.4	5.3	1.8	0.5	48.9	48.8	3,798
Source: SCB

=== By votes ===
Location	Turnout	Share	Votes	S	C	M	FP	VPK	KDS	Other	Left	Right	Margin
Götaland	91.1	48.1	2,482,430	1,031,983	674,609	377,302	245,217	95,378	47,305	10,636	1,127,361	1,297,128	169,767
Svealand	90.7	37.1	1,915,514	839,088	427,183	302,537	185,977	122,170	25,409	13,150	961,258	915,697	45,561
Norrland	90.3	14.8	762,202	376,656	193,454	57,745	54,834	57,381	17,674	4,458	434,037	306,033	128,004
Total	90.8	100.0	5,160,146	2,247,727	1,295,246	737,584	486,028	274,929	90,388	28,244	2,522,656	2,518,858	3,798
Source: SCB

== Results by constituency ==
=== Percentage share ===
Location	Land	Turnout	Share	Votes	S	C	M	FP	VPK	KDS	Other	Left	Right	Margin
Location		%	%		%	%	%	%	%	%	%	%	%	
Blekinge	G	90.8	1.9	98,425	49.6	22.9	12.0	9.4	4.1	1.8	0.3	53.7	44.3	9,297
Bohuslän	G	90.5	3.1	161,583	37.8	25.1	15.2	16.2	4.1	1.4	0.4	41.9	56.4	23,375
Gothenburg	G	88.9	5.5	282,771	38.2	15.8	16.3	18.9	8.4	1.1	1.3	46.6	51.0	12,378
Gotland	G	90.2	0.7	34,186	37.2	39.6	12.7	7.3	1.8	1.0	0.4	39.0	59.6	7,041
Gävleborg	N	89.6	3.7	189,221	50.1	26.0	7.0	6.7	8.2	1.6	0.5	58.3	39.7	35,069
Halland	G	91.9	2.6	134,086	36.6	37.4	14.5	7.6	2.6	0.9	0.3	39.3	59.5	27,180
Jämtland	N	89.5	1.7	86,774	48.2	30.4	8.0	7.3	4.2	1.5	0.5	52.3	45.7	5,704
Jönköping	G	92.4	3.7	192,883	38.1	29.2	14.1	9.9	2.8	5.5	0.3	40.9	53.2	23,837
Kalmar	G	91.2	3.0	157,126	43.9	29.9	14.3	5.5	3.9	2.4	0.2	47.7	49.7	3,039
Kopparberg	S	89.8	3.4	178,106	47.0	31.5	7.9	6.5	4.9	1.8	0.4	51.9	45.9	10,690
Kristianstad	G	90.6	3.7	172,529	40.9	32.2	14.6	8.3	2.1	1.7	0.1	43.1	55.1	20,783
Kronoberg	G	91.0	2.1	107,136	38.8	34.7	14.8	5.7	4.0	1.7	0.1	42.8	55.2	13,254
Fyrstadskretsen	G	91.1	5.9	302,027	47.7	20.5	19.1	7.6	3.9	0.7	0.5	51.6	47.2	13,382
Malmöhus	G	92.7	3.2	167,424	44.2	31.3	14.6	7.5	1.4	0.9	0.2	45.6	53.3	12,920
Norrbotten	N	89.6	3.0	157,383	52.1	18.5	8.1	5.1	13.5	2.1	0.8	65.5	31.6	53,334
Skaraborg	G	91.0	3.2	166,654	35.6	33.6	14.7	10.0	2.9	3.0	0.2	38.5	58.2	32,841
Stockholm	S	89.1	9.1	469,386	39.4	14.8	23.3	11.2	9.2	1.0	0.9	48.6	49.4	4,010
Stockholm County	S	91.6	8.8	452,123	38.5	22.2	20.3	10.4	6.8	1.0	0.8	45.3	52.9	34,720
Södermanland	S	92.2	3.0	154,732	50.7	23.0	11.1	9.2	3.7	1.8	0.3	54.5	43.3	17,266
Uppsala	S	90.3	2.7	139,874	43.0	26.9	12.9	9.5	5.5	1.5	0.7	48.4	49.3	1,169
Värmland	S	91.6	3.6	188,565	48.3	26.0	10.5	8.8	4.9	1.0	0.4	53.2	45.4	14,643
Västerbotten	N	90.1	2.9	150,036	45.0	26.2	8.5	11.8	3.9	4.0	0.7	48.9	46.5	3,594
Västernorrland	N	92.1	3.5	178,788	50.7	27.7	6.7	5.6	6.3	2.4	0.5	57.0	40.1	30,303
Västmanland	S	90.7	3.0	155,418	50.8	23.2	9.7	9.0	5.2	1.4	0.5	56.0	42.0	21,833
Älvsborg N	G	91.2	2.8	144,775	40.2	30.0	12.5	11.8	3.4	1.8	0.3	43.6	54.3	15,527
Älvsborg S	G	93.0	2.2	113,450	39.4	29.0	18.8	7.6	3.3	1.6	0.3	42.7	55.4	14,421
Örebro	S	90.9	3.4	177,310	49.8	23.9	9.6	9.2	4.8	2.3	0.5	54.6	42.7	21,028
Östergötland	G	91.2	4.8	247,375	47.3	24.5	13.9	7.2	4.0	2.6	0.4	51.3	45.6	14,150
Total		90.8	100.0	5,160,146	43.6	25.1	14.3	9.4	5.3	1.8	0.6	48.9	48.8	3,798
Source: SCB

=== By votes ===
Location	Land	Turnout	Share	Votes	S	C	M	FP	VPK	KDS	Other	Left	Right	Margin
Location		%	%											
Blekinge	G	90.8	1.9	98,425	48,778	22,515	11,784	9,264	4,082	1,744	258	52,860	43,563	9,297
Bohuslän	G	90.5	3.1	161,583	61,139	40,488	24,500	26,114	6,588	2,209	545	67,727	91,102	23,375
Gotland	G	90.2	0.7	34,186	12,722	13,528	4,344	2,506	615	332	139	13,337	20,378	7,041
Gävleborg	N	89.6	3.7	189,221	94,781	49,216	13,250	12,707	15,461	2,945	861	110,242	75,173	35,069
Gothenburg	G	88.9	5.5	282,771	108,075	44,560	46,166	53,368	23,641	2,977	3,984	131,716	144,094	12,378
Halland	G	91.9	2.6	134,086	49,103	50,137	19,459	10,220	3,533	1,252	382	52,636	79,816	27,180
Jämtland	N	89.5	1.7	86,774	41,791	26,389	6,971	6,336	3,609	1,267	411	45,400	39,696	5,704
Jönköping	G	92.4	3.7	192,883	73,431	56,395	27,238	19,077	5,442	10,696	604	78,873	102,710	23,837
Kalmar	G	91.2	3.0	157,126	68,928	47,022	22,454	8,566	6,075	3,765	316	75,003	78,042	3,039
Kopparberg	S	89.8	3.4	178,106	83,642	56,031	14,089	11,645	8,813	3,123	763	92,455	81,765	10,690
Kristianstad	G	90.6	3.7	172,529	70,631	55,526	25,161	14,405	3,678	2,922	206	74,309	95,092	20,783
Kronoberg	G	91.0	2.1	107,136	41,575	37,144	15,879	6,106	4,300	1,866	266	45,875	59,129	13,254
Fyrstadskretsen	G	91.1	5.9	302,027	144,083	62,040	57,611	22,853	11,803	2,117	1,520	155,886	142,504	13,382
Malmöhus	G	92.7	3.2	167,424	74,059	52,379	24,409	12,493	2,302	1,442	340	76,361	89,281	12,920
Norrbotten	N	89.6	3.0	157,383	81,955	29,085	12,672	8,037	21,173	3,283	1,178	103,128	49,794	53,334
Skaraborg	G	91.0	3.2	166,654	59,408	55,981	24,442	16,630	4,804	5,040	349	64,212	97,053	32,841
Stockholm	S	89.1	9.1	469,386	184,758	69,687	109,549	52,728	43,196	4,627	4,841	227,954	231,964	4,010
Stockholm County	S	91.6	8.8	452,123	173,849	100,558	91,781	47,050	30,820	4,547	3,518	204,669	239,389	34,720
Södermanland	S	92.2	3.0	154,732	78,498	35,658	17,127	14,242	5,795	2,831	581	84,293	67,027	17,266
Uppsala	S	90.3	2.7	139,874	60,090	37,581	18,037	13,318	7,677	2,257	914	67,767	68,936	1,169
Värmland	S	91.6	3.6	188,565	91,054	49,121	19,893	16,658	9,261	1,798	780	100,315	85,672	14,643
Västerbotten	N	90.1	2.9	150,036	67,516	39,246	12,815	17,653	5,792	5,952	1,062	73,308	69,714	3,594
Västernorrland	N	92.1	3.5	178,788	90,613	49,518	12,037	10,101	11,346	4,227	946	101,959	71,656	30,303
Västmanland	S	90.7	3.0	155,418	78,965	36,099	15,086	14,060	8,113	2,216	879	87,078	65,245	21,833
Älvsborg N	G	91.2	2.8	144,775	58,258	43,498	18,028	17,115	4,856	2,651	369	63,114	78,641	15,527
Älvsborg S	G	93.0	2.2	113,450	44,741	32,874	21,385	8,611	3,708	1,782	349	48,449	62,870	14,421
Örebro	S	90.9	3.4	177,310	88,232	42,448	16,975	16,276	8,495	4,010	874	96,727	75,699	21,028
Östergötland	G	91.2	4.8	247,375	117,052	60,522	34,442	17,889	9,951	6,510	1,009	127,003	112,853	14,150
Total		90.8	100.0	5,160,146	2,247,727	1,295,246	737,584	486,028	274,929	90,388	28,244	2,522,656	2,518,858	3,798
Source: SCB

== 1970–1973 bloc comparison ==
=== Percentage share ===
Constituency	Land	+/-	Votes 1970	Left 1970	Right 1970	Win 1970	Votes 1973	Left 1973	Right 1973	Win 1973	Change
Constituency		%									
Blekinge	G	3.0	95,576	54.39	43.86	10.53	98,425	53.71	44.26	9.45	1.08
Bohuslän	G	3.8	155,653	41.08	57.39	16.31	161,583	41.91	56.38	14.47	1.84
Gothenburg	G	3.4	273,369	46.16	51.76	5.60	282,771	46.58	50.96	4.38	1.22
Gotland	G	2.8	33,251	39.40	59.31	19.91	34,186	39.01	61.29	22.28	2.37
Gävleborg	N	3.0	183,731	60.08	38.08	22.00	189,221	58.26	39.73	18.53	3.47
Halland	G	11.8	119,972	40.04	58.41	18.37	134,086	39.26	59.53	20.27	1.90
Jämtland	N	8.0	80,319	53.01	44.83	8.18	86,774	52.32	45.75	6.57	1.61
Jönköping	G	0.1	192,625	41.67	53.51	11.84	192,883	40.89	53.32	12.43	0.59
Kalmar	G	2.4	153,510	48.57	48.45	0.12	157,126	47.73	49.67	1.94	2.06
Kopparberg	S	2.8	173,240	53.84	44.13	9.71	178,106	51.91	45.91	6.00	3.71
Kristianstad	G	3.6	166,509	44.52	53.17	8.65	172,529	43.07	55.12	12.05	3.40
Kronoberg	G	4.0	103,021	43.13	54.67	11.54	107,136	42.82	55.19	12.37	0.83
Fyrstadskretsen	G	5.2	287,147	53.36	45.49	7.87	302,027	51.61	47.18	4.43	3.44
Malmöhus	G	2.4	163,491	47.20	51.87	4.67	167,424	45.61	53.32	7.71	3.04
Norrbotten	N	4.7	150,316	65.43	31.66	33.77	157,383	65.53	31.64	33.89	0.12
Skaraborg	G	3.7	160,647	38.71	58.31	19.60	166,654	38.53	58.24	19.71	0.11
Stockholm	S	-3.4	490,884	49.92	47.77	2.15	469,386	48.56	49.42	0.86	3.01
Stockholm County	S	14.7	394,126	47.61	50.65	3.04	452,123	45.27	52.95	7.68	4.64
Södermanland	S	3.2	149,881	56.30	41.77	14.53	154,732	54.48	43.32	11.16	3.37
Uppsala	S	6.5	131,282	49.44	47.94	1.50	139,874	48.45	49.28	0.83	2.33
Värmland	S	2.6	183,757	55.87	42.73	13.14	188,565	53.20	45.43	7.77	5.37
Västerbotten	N	2.9	145,741	48.98	46.83	2.15	150,036	48.86	46.46	2.40	0.25
Västernorrland	N	0.7	177,619	58.82	38.40	20.42	178,788	57.03	40.08	16.95	3.47
Västmanland	S	4.6	148,587	58.30	39.90	18.40	155,418	56.03	41.98	14.05	4.35
Älvsborg N	G	6.4	136,078	44.31	53.46	9.15	144,775	43.59	54.32	10.73	1.58
Älvsborg S	G	1.4	111,877	42.78	55.69	12.91	113,450	42.71	55.42	12.71	0.20
Örebro	S	1.9	174,031	55.47	41.94	13.53	177,310	54.55	42.69	11.86	1.67
Östergötland	G	3.1	239,956	53.11	44.08	9.03	247,375	51.34	45.62	5.72	3.31
Total		3.7	4,976,196	50.10	47,66	2.44	5,160,146	48.89	48.81	0.08	2.36
Source: SCB

=== By votes ===
Constituency	Land	+/-	Votes 1970	Left 1970	Right 1970	Win 1970	Votes 1973	Left 1973	Right 1973	Win 1973	Change
Constituency		%									
Blekinge	G	3.0	95,576	51,984	41,916	10,068	98,425	52,860	43,563	9,297	771
Bohuslän	G	3.8	155,653	63,947	89,327	25,380	161,583	67,727	91,102	23,375	2,005
Gothenburg	G	3.4	273,369	126,190	141,486	15,296	282,771	131,716	144,094	12,378	2,918
Gotland	G	2.8	33,251	13,102	19,721	6,619	34,186	13,337	20,378	7,041	422
Gävleborg	N	3.0	183,731	110,377	69,967	40,410	189,221	110,242	75,173	35,069	5,341
Halland	G	11.8	119,972	48,031	70,073	22,042	134,086	52,636	79,816	27,180	5,138
Jämtland	N	8.0	80,319	42,578	36,007	6,571	86,774	45,400	39,696	5,704	867
Jönköping	G	0.1	192,625	80,260	103,075	22,815	192,883	78,873	102,710	23,837	1,022
Kalmar	G	2.4	153,510	74,559	74,374	185	157,126	75,003	78,042	3,039	3,224
Kopparberg	S	2.8	173,240	93,272	76,453	16,819	178,106	92,455	81,765	10,690	6,129
Kristianstad	G	3.6	166,509	74,123	88,537	14,414	172,529	74,309	95,092	20,783	6,369
Kronoberg	G	4.0	103,021	44,434	56,326	11,892	107,136	45,875	59,129	13,254	1,362
Fyrstadskretsen	G	5.2	287,147	153,208	130,612	22,596	302,027	155,886	142,504	13,382	9,214
Malmöhus	G	2.4	163,491	77,165	84,804	7,639	167,424	76,361	89,281	12,920	5,281
Norrbotten	N	4.7	150,316	98,357	47,587	50,770	157,383	103,128	49,794	53,334	2,564
Skaraborg	G	3.7	160,647	62,194	93,681	31,487	166,654	64,212	97,053	32,841	1,354
Stockholm	S	-3.4	490,884	245,051	234,505	10,546	469,386	227,954	231,964	4,010	14,556
Stockholm County	S	14.7	394,126	187,631	199,627	11,996	452,123	204,669	239,389	34,720	22,724
Södermanland	S	3.2	149,881	84,377	62,598	21,779	154,732	84,293	67,027	17,266	4,513
Uppsala	S	6.5	131,282	64,908	62,940	1,968	139,874	67,767	68,936	1,169	3,137
Värmland	S	2.6	183,757	102,659	78,526	24,133	188,565	100,315	85,672	14,643	9,490
Västerbotten	N	2.9	145,741	71,385	68,246	3,139	150,036	73,308	69,714	3,594	455
Västernorrland	N	0.7	177,619	104,483	68,200	36,283	178,788	101,959	71,656	30,303	5,980
Västmanland	S	4.6	148,587	86,620	59,280	27,340	155,418	87,078	65,245	21,833	5,507
Älvsborg N	G	6.4	136,078	60,301	72,745	12,444	144,775	63,114	78,641	15,527	3,083
Älvsborg S	G	1.4	111,877	47,864	62,305	14,441	113,450	48,449	62,870	14,421	20
Örebro	S	1.9	174,031	96,531	72,985	23,546	177,310	96,727	75,699	21,028	2,518
Östergötland	G	3.1	239,956	127,437	105,784	21,653	247,375	127,003	112,853	14,150	7,503
Total		3.7	4,976,196	2,493,028	2,371,687	121,341	5,160,146	2,522,656	2,518,858	3,798	117,543
Source: SCB

== Municipal summary ==
Location	County	Turnout	Votes	S	C	M	FP	VPK	KDS	Other	Left	Right
Ale	Älvsborg	92.2	11,249	46.4	27.2	8.6	10.5	5.1	2.0	0.1	51.6	46.3
Alingsås	Älvsborg	91.0	17,217	36.1	27.3	13.7	16.3	3.1	2.9	0.5	39.3	57.3
Alvesta	Kronoberg	90.8	11,775	36.7	38.1	14.0	5.6	3.4	1.9	0.1	40.1	57.8
Aneby	Jönköping	91.6	4,135	26.1	37.3	14.8	12.2	1.1	8.6	0.0	27.1	64.3
Arboga	Västmanland	91.6	9,486	50.7	24.4	10.3	9.1	4.3	1.0	0.2	55.0	43.9
Arjeplog	Norrbotten	86.6	2,706	45.9	19.6	3.7	5.1	22.9	2.3	0.5	68.8	28.4
Arvidsjaur	Norrbotten	90.3	5,512	51.4	18.5	5.4	5.9	15.8	2.1	0.9	67.2	29.8
Arvika	Värmland	89.9	18,314	44.5	27.2	8.9	12.5	5.8	0.7	0.4	50.3	48.6
Askersund	Örebro	90.1	7,452	47.7	29.9	8.5	7.4	2.4	4.0	0.2	50.0	45.8
Avesta	Kopparberg	91.7	17,543	54.1	26.7	5.2	5.0	6.4	2.0	0.6	60.4	36.9
Bara	Malmöhus	94.7	2,717	39.8	34.2	17.3	7.1	1.1	0.5	0.0	40.9	58.6
Bengtsfors	Älvsborg	90.3	8,267	44.5	34.3	8.1	8.7	2.0	2.4	0.1	46.5	51.1
Berg	Jämtland	87.2	5,978	38.9	40.7	7.9	6.8	3.6	1.5	0.5	42.5	55.5
Bjuv	Malmöhus	93.3	8,064	59.8	23.2	8.6	5.3	2.3	0.6	0.1	62.1	37.1
Boden	Norrbotten	90.1	17,806	52.4	18.2	10.1	6.6	9.4	2.7	0.5	61.8	34.9
Bollnäs	Gävleborg	89.7	21,759	42.9	33.3	5.5	8.4	7.4	2.1	0.5	50.3	47.1
Borgholm	Kalmar	90.7	7,085	25.7	50.1	13.7	4.9	2.2	2.4	0.2	27.9	68.6
Borlänge	Kopparberg	91.1	28,033	53.4	28.1	6.5	5.2	4.7	1.6	0.5	58.1	39.8
Borås	Älvsborg	92.5	65,758	42.0	24.0	19.5	8.3	4.1	1.6	0.4	46.2	51.8
Botkyrka	Stockholm	91.6	29,362	41.9	23.1	15.1	10.8	7.3	0.8	1.1	49.2	48.9
Boxholm	Östergötland	91.7	4,006	52.9	27.8	7.0	3.6	6.5	2.1	0.0	59.3	38.4
Bromölla	Kristianstad	92.0	6,690	62.1	17.1	7.1	6.2	6.2	1.1	0.2	68.3	30.4
Bräcke	Jämtland	92.1	6,582	56.5	27.1	6.3	4.6	4.4	0.9	0.2	61.0	38.0
Burlöv	Malmöhus	93.4	8,066	54.2	22.2	13.3	7.0	3.0	0.2	0.2	57.1	42.5
Båstad	Kristianstad	90.6	7,146	21.1	47.7	20.4	8.9	0.9	1.0	0.0	22.0	77.0
Dals-Ed	Älvsborg	89.1	3,290	25.4	50.6	10.3	8.5	1.3	3.8	0.0	26.7	69.4
Danderyd	Stockholm	94.5	17,866	20.0	15.9	47.0	11.8	4.1	0.7	0.6	24.1	74.6
Degerfors	Örebro	94.7	7,533	63.1	18.7	5.2	5.3	4.9	2.3	0.4	68.0	29.2
Eda	Värmland	91.3	6,496	51.3	28.8	7.9	7.1	3.6	1.1	0.1	55.0	43.8
Ekerö	Stockholm	94.2	8,086	33.1	24.8	23.9	11.9	5.2	1.0	0.3	38.2	60.5
Eksjö	Jönköping	91.6	12,049	34.3	33.2	14.7	10.8	1.6	5.1	0.4	35.9	58.6
Emmaboda	Kalmar	92.0	7,462	45.5	35.0	10.1	4.1	3.7	1.4	0.2	49.2	49.1
Enköping	Uppsala	89.5	19,185	42.4	33.6	12.4	7.0	3.0	1.5	0.1	45.4	53.0
Eskilstuna	Södermanland	91.5	55,242	52.3	19.9	10.3	11.0	4.5	1.6	0.4	56.8	41.2
Eslöv	Malmöhus	91.2	16,685	44.7	34.9	11.5	6.7	1.1	0.8	0.3	45.8	53.1
Fagersta	Västmanland	92.3	9,812	61.4	16.5	8.1	7.3	5.4	0.8	0.6	66.8	31.9
Falkenberg	Halland	92.9	21,252	34.3	44.3	13.2	5.8	1.5	0.7	0.1	35.8	63.3
Falköping	Skaraborg	91.6	21,786	30.7	39.5	15.5	8.3	2.2	3.6	0.2	32.9	63.3
Falun	Kopparberg	89.2	30,135	40.1	32.1	12.7	9.3	3.8	1.6	0.4	43.9	54.1
Filipstad	Värmland	91.3	10,436	61.2	16.3	7.9	6.8	6.9	0.6	0.3	68.1	31.0
Finspång	Östergötland	93.7	15,333	56.9	20.6	9.3	6.1	3.9	2.9	0.3	60.8	35.9
Flen	Södermanland	93.5	11,513	49.4	26.8	10.6	8.0	3.2	1.8	0.2	52.6	45.4
Forshaga	Värmland	93.8	6,823	59.4	22.3	6.4	6.6	4.0	1.2	0.1	63.4	35.3
Färgelanda	Älvsborg	90.7	4,381	32.1	47.4	12.8	6.0	1.3	0.5	0.0	33.2	66.1
Gagnef	Kopparberg	92.0	5,652	42.8	41.5	5.2	5.1	3.0	1.8	0.5	45.8	51.8
Gislaved	Jönköping	93.7	16,201	37.1	36.4	12.6	8.9	1.9	2.9	0.1	39.1	57.8
Gnosjö	Jönköping	95.3	4,842	29.2	35.8	14.9	9.7	2.0	8.3	0.1	31.2	60.4
Gothenburg	Gothenburg	88.9	282,771	38.2	15.8	16.3	18.9	8.4	1.1	1.3	46.6	51.0
Gotland	Gotland	90.2	34,186	37.2	39.6	12.7	7.3	1.8	1.0	0.4	39.0	59.6
Grums	Värmland	92.1	6,925	56.6	25.2	5.6	5.5	5.5	1.2	0.4	62.1	36.3
Grästorp	Skaraborg	91.5	3,579	22.2	46.4	18.4	9.9	1.4	1.7	0.0	23.6	74.7
Gullspång	Skaraborg	89.7	4,380	39.2	36.7	11.1	8.2	2.1	2.6	0.1	41.3	56.0
Gällivare	Norrbotten	86.6	14,719	48.8	13.5	10.6	3.6	20.7	0.7	2.2	69.5	27.7
Gävle	Gävleborg	88.8	53,724	53.1	20.6	9.5	8.6	6.2	1.5	0.4	59.3	38.7
Götene	Skaraborg	90.8	7,817	36.4	30.8	13.9	11.1	2.7	5.1	0.1	39.1	55.7
Habo	Skaraborg	92.2	3,723	30.4	33.7	14.6	11.8	1.5	7.9	0.1	31.9	60.2
Hagfors	Värmland	93.6	13,011	61.3	20.0	5.4	3.8	8.2	0.8	0.4	69.5	29.2
Hallsberg	Örebro	91.5	10,751	51.3	26.4	7.1	8.8	3.6	2.5	0.3	54.8	42.3
Hallstahammar	Västmanland	91.9	10,459	59.8	17.9	7.2	6.9	6.7	1.1	0.4	66.5	32.0
Halmstad	Halland	91.3	46,212	45.0	27.1	14.5	7.7	4.2	1.2	0.2	49.2	49.3
Hammarö	Värmland	93.8	7,077	60.1	17.5	8.4	7.6	5.5	0.3	0.6	65.6	33.5
Haninge	Stockholm	90.3	25,285	41.1	25.9	12.7	10.0	8.5	0.6	1.2	49.6	48.6
Haparanda	Norrbotten	89.3	4,938	46.2	24.6	13.8	3.6	10.8	0.7	0.3	57.0	41.9
Heby	Västmanland	89.4	8,366	42.2	38.9	5.2	7.0	4.7	1.3	0.4	47.0	51.2
Hedemora	Kopparberg	91.0	10,649	49.3	31.0	7.7	5.5	4.1	2.0	0.4	53.4	44.2
Helsingborg	Malmöhus	90.6	65,180	46.1	20.8	20.0	8.2	3.5	1.0	0.5	49.6	49.0
Herrljunga	Älvsborg	93.2	6,012	25.8	40.3	18.2	12.6	1.4	1.5	0.2	27.2	71.1
Hjo	Skaraborg	91.2	4,879	37.9	28.3	16.6	9.3	2.0	5.8	0.1	39.9	54.3
Hofors	Gävleborg	90.5	9,197	58.5	16.8	5.3	4.3	13.8	0.7	0.6	72.3	26.5
Huddinge	Stockholm	91.4	32,752	40.4	23.7	15.1	10.3	8.7	1.0	0.8	49.0	49.2
Hudiksvall	Gävleborg	88.7	23,442	42.0	35.2	6.2	4.8	9.5	1.8	0.6	51.5	46.1
Hultsfred	Kalmar	92.0	12,254	42.7	31.5	13.5	5.5	3.0	3.8	0.1	45.7	50.4
Hylte	Halland	93.9	7,338	36.9	44.2	11.9	4.6	1.1	0.8	0.3	38.0	60.8
Håbo	Uppsala	92.8	4,168	42.0	28.9	13.5	9.6	5.2	0.6	0.2	47.2	52.0
Hällefors	Örebro	91.0	7,062	64.4	15.4	4.9	4.9	8.9	1.2	0.2	73.3	25.2
Härjedalen	Jämtland	85.8	8,298	55.6	25.3	5.4	6.1	6.1	1.1	0.5	61.7	36.7
Härnösand	Västernorrland	92.5	18,561	43.9	33.7	10.0	5.5	5.0	1.5	0.4	48.8	49.2
Härryda	Bohuslän	92.2	11,211	34.1	26.7	16.5	16.5	5.2	0.7	0.4	39.2	59.6
Hässleholm	Kristianstad	90.5	30,532	36.0	36.5	13.6	9.1	2.0	2.6	0.0	38.1	59.2
Höganäs	Malmöhus	93.2	13,028	43.0	23.5	22.9	7.9	1.3	1.1	0.4	44.3	54.2
Högsby	Kalmar	92.8	5,636	44.4	30.3	13.3	4.4	3.9	3.8	0.1	48.2	47.9
Hörby	Malmöhus	90.6	7,760	24.0	48.2	10.4	13.3	0.8	3.0	0.2	24.9	71.9
Höör	Malmöhus	90.8	6,133	29.4	40.7	16.7	9.8	1.5	1.9	0.1	30.9	67.1
Jokkmokk	Norrbotten	84.1	4,684	54.0	14.5	6.3	5.7	17.7	1.5	0.3	71.7	26.6
Järfälla	Stockholm	93.0	28,585	38.5	22.3	18.9	12.0	6.5	1.1	0.6	45.0	53.2
Jönköping	Jönköping	92.1	69,139	42.1	22.9	15.0	10.7	3.4	5.6	0.4	45.5	48.5
Kalix	Norrbotten	93.1	11,897	61.1	18.3	7.1	3.3	8.5	1.0	0.7	69.6	28.8
Kalmar	Kalmar	90.9	34,510	45.8	23.5	18.3	7.0	3.6	1.6	0.3	49.4	48.7
Karlsborg	Skaraborg	93.3	5,602	45.3	29.8	11.9	8.6	1.8	2.6	0.0	47.1	50.2
Karlshamn	Blekinge	90.3	20,270	51.5	21.7	11.5	7.1	6.1	1.7	0.5	57.6	40.3
Karlskoga	Örebro	91.6	24,449	55.3	19.4	9.4	7.0	7.0	1.3	0.6	62.3	35.9
Karlskrona	Blekinge	90.6	39,774	48.3	21.6	12.7	11.9	3.3	2.0	0.5	51.6	46.3
Karlstad	Värmland	92.0	47,969	45.0	24.3	15.0	10.1	4.2	0.8	0.6	49.2	49.4
Katrineholm	Södermanland	92.4	21,323	52.2	23.6	10.3	8.9	2.3	2.4	0.3	54.5	42.8
Kil	Värmland	92.8	5,719	39.0	31.6	10.5	15.0	3.0	0.6	0.4	42.0	57.0
Kinda	Östergötland	91.6	7,000	33.5	41.2	14.0	5.5	1.6	4.0	0.2	35.2	60.7
Kiruna	Norrbotten	83.5	15,875	52.2	12.8	6.6	6.6	19.9	1.3	0.5	72.1	26.0
Klippan	Kristianstad	90.8	10,325	41.9	35.2	14.1	6.4	1.7	0.5	0.1	43.7	55.7
Kramfors	Västernorrland	93.8	20,449	54.3	27.1	4.6	2.6	8.9	1.8	0.6	63.3	34.3
Kristianstad	Kristianstad	91.2	43,881	45.9	26.6	13.9	9.5	2.3	1.6	0.2	48.3	50.0
Kristinehamn	Värmland	91.6	18,158	49.7	21.9	11.6	10.0	5.3	1.3	0.2	55.1	43.5
Krokom	Jämtland	88.9	8,559	44.5	34.6	7.6	7.6	3.0	2.4	0.4	47.5	49.7
Kumla	Örebro	91.1	10,783	48.2	24.6	8.0	9.7	5.5	3.6	0.4	53.7	42.3
Kungsbacka	Halland	92.6	20,338	27.0	36.5	20.6	12.7	2.2	0.7	0.2	29.2	69.9
Kungsör	Västmanland	92.6	4,931	49.7	24.9	7.9	10.5	5.6	1.1	0.3	55.2	43.3
Kungälv	Bohuslän	92.3	16,358	36.2	28.5	16.9	13.4	3.5	1.3	0.4	39.6	58.8
Kävlinge	Malmöhus	94.2	10,389	51.8	29.9	9.9	6.4	1.5	0.3	0.1	53.4	46.3
Köping	Västmanland	90.5	16,091	54.1	23.6	7.3	6.7	5.3	2.2	0.8	59.5	37.5
Laholm	Halland	91.9	12,714	27.4	54.1	11.5	5.0	1.2	0.6	0.1	28.6	70.6
Landskrona	Malmöhus	92.1	24,196	57.9	18.5	13.7	6.5	2.4	0.8	0.2	60.3	38.6
Laxå	Örebro	91.5	5,436	53.3	24.8	6.3	6.5	5.8	3.1	0.1	59.1	37.6
Leksand	Kopparberg	89.5	8,329	36.5	40.0	9.7	8.8	1.9	2.9	0.3	38.4	58.4
Lerum	Älvsborg	93.6	15,295	30.6	25.7	19.4	18.3	3.9	1.5	0.6	34.5	63.3
Lessebo	Kronoberg	94.3	5,692	56.0	22.9	9.0	3.7	7.2	1.0	0.2	63.2	35.6
Lidingö	Stockholm	93.2	22,265	23.6	16.8	40.9	11.9	5.2	0.5	1.0	28.8	69.6
Lidköping	Skaraborg	89.7	22,231	45.3	29.8	11.9	8.6	1.8	2.6	0.0	44.3	53.4
Lilla Edet	Älvsborg	91.0	6,102	49.5	29.7	8.0	8.0	3.6	1.0	0.1	53.1	45.7
Lindesberg	Örebro	90.9	15,758	45.9	31.3	8.6	7.5	3.9	2.4	0.4	49.8	47.4
Linköping	Östergötland	91.9	70,371	44.1	23.5	16.0	8.6	4.5	2.9	0.4	48.6	48.1
Ljungby	Kronoberg	90.4	16,475	33.9	38.7	14.4	7.1	3.0	2.7	0.3	36.9	60.1
Ljusdal	Gävleborg	86.5	14,397	43.6	31.2	5.1	6.5	11.5	1.7	0.4	55.1	42.8
Ljusnarsberg	Örebro	88.5	4,649	59.3	21.1	4.9	4.7	7.7	2.0	0.2	67.0	30.8
Lomma	Malmöhus	95.2	8,842	40.8	26.8	22.6	7.9	1.6	0.3	0.0	42.5	57.2
Ludvika	Kopparberg	89.0	21,040	56.6	20.5	6.8	5.1	9.3	1.2	0.6	65.8	32.4
Luleå	Norrbotten	90.9	37,685	50.2	19.7	9.9	6.8	10.7	1.9	0.8	60.9	36.4
Lund	Malmöhus	92.5	47,369	39.4	24.6	19.8	8.4	6.4	0.7	0.6	45.8	52.8
Lycksele	Västerbotten	89.8	9,245	46.5	18.2	7.1	16.2	3.0	8.4	0.5	49.5	41.5
Lysekil	Bohuslän	91.0	9,253	52.7	15.2	13.0	14.8	3.1	0.7	0.5	55.8	43.0
Malmö	Malmöhus	90.7	165,282	49.2	19.6	19.3	7.2	3.6	0.6	0.5	52.8	46.1
Malung	Kopparberg	91.6	8,101	47.0	31.9	7.7	8.5	3.4	1.4	0.2	50.4	48.0
Mariestad	Skaraborg	90.4	14,889	39.9	28.4	14.6	9.9	3.6	3.2	0.5	43.4	52.9
Mark	Älvsborg	93.7	19,463	43.6	30.4	16.8	4.1	3.6	1.3	0.2	47.2	51.4
Markaryd	Kronoberg	91.5	7,219	42.0	33.7	11.3	5.7	3.7	3.4	0.1	45.7	50.8
Mellerud	Älvsborg	92.2	7,174	31.9	45.0	11.9	6.7	1.6	2.8	0.0	33.5	63.6
Mjölby	Östergötland	90.9	16,120	47.2	29.5	10.8	5.9	3.5	2.7	0.2	50.7	46.2
Mora	Kopparberg	88.6	11,327	37.3	41.2	10.0	6.6	3.5	1.2	0.2	40.8	57.7
Motala	Östergötland	91.3	31,121	52.1	22.9	11.2	7.1	4.0	2.4	0.3	56.1	41.1
Mullsjö	Skaraborg	94.3	2,931	28.4	36.4	12.5	11.8	1.6	9.3	0.0	30.0	60.7
Munkedal	Bohuslän	90.2	6,508	37.5	34.8	14.7	10.0	2.0	0.9	0.1	39.5	59.5
Munkfors	Värmland	94.6	3,933	67.7	15.5	4.4	6.3	4.7	1.0	0.4	72.4	26.2
Mölndal	Bohuslän	90.8	27,842	38.9	20.7	14.4	17.2	6.9	1.2	0.6	45.8	52.4
Mönsterås	Kalmar	91.4	8,540	47.7	25.9	12.7	4.3	5.5	3.7	0.1	53.2	43.0
Mörbylånga	Kalmar	92.0	6,857	34.3	39.2	16.8	6.8	1.8	1.0	0.0	36.2	62.8
Nacka	Stockholm	91.9	29,957	35.4	17.9	26.0	11.5	7.7	0.7	0.9	43.1	55.3
Nora	Örebro	89.9	5,833	49.9	24.0	8.8	9.2	5.0	2.8	0.3	54.9	42.0
Norberg	Västmanland	91.5	4,245	62.5	17.9	6.8	4.5	6.5	1.3	0.4	69.1	29.2
Nordanstig	Gävleborg	89.7	7,730	39.9	40.0	3.5	6.4	7.4	2.5	0.3	47.2	49.9
Nordmaling	Västerbotten	92.2	5,312	44.2	29.9	9.7	10.5	1.2	4.3	0.2	45.4	50.1
Norrköping	Östergötland	89.7	75,630	48.9	20.9	15.9	7.2	4.4	2.1	0.6	53.3	44.0
Norrtälje	Stockholm	89.8	24,160	41.5	30.8	13.8	7.7	3.9	2.1	0.2	45.4	52.3
Norsjö	Västerbotten	87.0	6,499	46.1	24.0	6.2	13.9	5.5	3.8	0.6	51.6	44.1
Nybro	Kalmar	91.9	14,279	45.0	31.3	12.2	3.8	5.0	2.5	0.1	50.0	47.4
Nyköping	Södermanland	92.5	38,826	49.0	26.5	12.4	6.6	3.2	2.0	0.4	52.2	45.4
Nynäshamn	Stockholm	92.1	11,610	52.0	23.2	8.8	7.5	7.1	1.0	0.3	59.0	39.6
Nässjö	Jönköping	92.5	21,994	42.8	27.3	12.0	9.7	3.6	4.1	0.4	46.4	49.1
Ockelbo	Gävleborg	89.5	4,455	51.8	32.6	5.4	4.7	4.2	1.2	0.1	56.0	42.6
Olofström	Blekinge	91.3	9,214	51.4	23.6	9.4	7.6	4.5	2.9	0.7	55.9	40.6
Orsa	Kopparberg	86.2	4,407	37.3	40.4	8.8	5.0	6.2	1.3	0.3	43.6	56.0
Orust	Bohuslän	87.2	6,097	28.1	35.9	16.0	17.9	1.5	0.5	0.1	29.6	66.8
Osby	Kristianstad	91.5	8,972	43.5	32.9	11.0	6.5	3.6	2.5	0.0	47.1	50.4
Oskarshamn	Kalmar	91.1	17,601	49.9	22.9	12.8	6.7	4.1	3.3	0.4	54.0	42.3
Ovanåker	Gävleborg	91.2	5,274	44.5	32.9	5.2	10.0	3.9	3.5	0.0	48.4	48.1
Oxelösund	Södermanland	92.2	7,945	61.6	15.7	7.6	6.3	7.3	0.9	0.6	69.0	29.6
Pajala	Norrbotten	88.4	6,065	44.6	17.6	7.7	3.2	24.2	2.3	0.2	68.8	28.6
Partille	Bohuslän	92.7	16,043	35.5	19.2	17.1	19.5	6.7	1.5	0.5	42.2	55.8
Perstorp	Kristianstad	91.7	4,443	44.3	30.5	13.3	7.2	2.7	2.0	0.1	47.0	50.9
Piteå	Norrbotten	92.9	22,027	57.4	20.5	5.4	3.7	8.3	4.3	0.4	65.7	29.6
Ragunda	Jämtland	91.5	5,468	55.5	27.7	7.0	4.0	4.5	1.2	0.1	60.0	38.7
Robertsfors	Västerbotten	92.7	5,036	33.3	40.6	7.7	13.0	1.4	3.7	0.2	34.7	61.4
Ronneby	Blekinge	91.1	19,163	50.0	26.7	10.7	7.4	4.0	1.0	0.3	53.9	44.8
Rättvik	Kopparberg	84.9	6,867	36.6	39.8	8.5	8.0	4.5	2.5	0.1	41.1	56.2
Sala	Västmanland	91.2	13,129	40.1	36.6	9.8	8.8	3.1	1.2	0.4	43.2	55.2
Sandviken	Gävleborg	91.4	27,992	56.6	21.1	7.4	5.6	7.8	1.1	0.4	64.4	34.1
Sigtuna	Stockholm	91.0	14,557	40.7	27.3	14.9	9.7	6.3	0.7	0.5	47.0	51.8
Simrishamn	Kristianstad	87.9	13,191	39.5	32.5	15.8	9.7	1.4	0.9	0.2	40.9	58.1
Sjöbo	Malmöhus	90.1	8,924	32.4	47.4	11.1	7.7	0.8	0.5	0.1	33.1	66.2
Skara	Skaraborg	91.5	11,280	37.7	31.9	16.0	10.0	2.6	1.7	0.1	40.3	57.9
Skellefteå	Västerbotten	89.9	45,977	49.4	24.8	8.6	9.1	3.8	3.7	0.5	53.2	42.5
Skinnskatteberg	Västmanland	91.6	3,201	62.0	20.0	6.2	4.5	5.2	1.4	0.8	67.2	30.6
Skurup	Malmöhus	91.8	7,227	40.5	41.5	9.5	6.4	0.8	1.0	0.3	41.4	57.4
Skövde	Skaraborg	90.6	26,592	38.0	30.4	14.1	11.1	3.5	2.5	0.4	41.5	55.6
Smedjebacken	Kopparberg	91.7	8,275	61.4	21.2	5.0	5.3	5.7	1.0	0.2	67.1	31.6
Sollefteå	Västernorrland	92.8	18,790	54.8	27.9	6.6	2.2	6.1	1.8	0.4	61.0	36.8
Sollentuna	Stockholm	93.2	24,254	35.1	23.3	21.9	11.0	6.3	1.5	0.8	41.5	56.3
Solna	Stockholm	90.2	36,909	38.6	16.6	22.8	11.5	8.2	1.1	1.3	46.9	50.9
Sorsele	Västerbotten	87.0	2,625	41.3	22.2	5.0	17.1	4.9	9.3	0.3	46.2	44.3
Sotenäs	Bohuslän	90.2	6,370	46.3	19.1	11.3	20.2	2.0	1.1	0.1	48.3	50.6
Staffanstorp	Malmöhus	95.2	8,047	37.8	33.6	19.8	7.1	1.4	0.2	0.0	39.2	60.5
Stenungsund	Bohuslän	89.8	7,638	34.9	31.5	14.7	14.3	3.9	0.2	0.4	38.8	60.6
Stockholm	Stockholm	89.1	469,386	39.4	14.8	23.3	11.2	9.2	1.0	0.9	48.6	49.4
Storfors	Värmland	94.6	3,506	60.9	20.8	8.4	5.1	3.3	1.0	0.4	64.2	34.3
Storuman	Västerbotten	86.6	5,057	38.7	23.0	9.5	17.2	3.6	7.6	0.5	42.3	49.7
Strängnäs	Södermanland	92.5	13,741	43.0	24.6	15.5	11.9	3.1	1.5	0.4	46.1	52.0
Strömstad	Bohuslän	87.2	6,140	43.2	29.0	10.9	13.6	1.6	1.5	0.1	44.9	53.5
Strömsund	Jämtland	90.8	12,286	54.8	28.0	5.1	4.7	5.4	1.5	0.6	60.1	37.8
Sundbyberg	Stockholm	90.5	19,413	48.8	16.9	14.0	9.6	9.0	0.6	1.1	57.8	40.5
Sundsvall	Västernorrland	91.2	59,630	49.7	25.6	8.3	7.1	6.9	1.7	0.5		
Sunne	Värmland	92.2	9,650	33.8	41.9	12.5	9.3	1.7	0.6	0.1	35.6	63.7
Surahammar	Västmanland	93.9	6,080	65.4	15.1	5.2	5.0	7.6	1.3	0.3	73.0	25.3
Svalöv	Malmöhus	92.7	8,006	42.6	38.9	11.0	5.3	1.5	0.7	0.0	44.1	55.2
Svedala	Malmöhus	94.0	4,646	53.9	27.7	10.3	5.1	1.3	1.5	0.2	55.2	43.1
Svenljunga	Älvsborg	93.1	6,544	31.2	41.2	19.7	5.7	0.8	1.5	0.0	32.0	66.5
Säffle	Värmland	90.5	13,063	38.9	37.0	11.1	7.8	3.6	1.6	0.1	42.5	55.8
Säter	Kopparberg	90.5	6,376	40.4	39.9	7.0	6.5	3.0	2.8	0.4	43.3	53.5
Sävsjö	Jönköping	91.5	7,510	25.5	40.0	17.3	9.3	1.8	6.0	0.1	27.3	66.6
Söderhamn	Gävleborg	91.9	21,251	55.6	21.0	6.9	4.7	10.5	1.0	0.3	66.1	32.5
Söderköping	Östergötland	92.3	6,457	35.4	38.0	15.3	6.0	2.1	3.0	0.2	37.5	59.3
Södertälje	Stockholm	90.2	42,332	46.0	23.2	13.9	8.1	6.5	1.5	0.7	52.5	45.2
Sölvesborg	Blekinge	91.5	10,004	48.2	22.2	14.6	9.8	3.5	1.6	0.0	51.7	46.6
Tanum	Bohuslän	87.7	7,183	26.5	40.0	16.8	15.2	0.9	0.5	0.1	27.4	72.0
Tibro	Skaraborg	91.5	6,544	39.0	32.3	9.8	11.6	3.2	4.1	0.1	42.1	53.6
Tidaholm	Skaraborg	92.4	8,616	44.8	31.5	9.9	7.1	3.5	3.0	0.2	48.3	48.4
Tierp	Uppsala	92.3	14,000	53.2	28.1	5.6	7.6	2.6	2.8	0.1	55.8	41.3
Timrå	Västernorrland	91.9	11,688	58.4	23.7	3.5	4.6	7.6	2.0	0.3	66.0	31.8
Tingsryd	Kronoberg	89.0	9,753	31.2	43.1	16.9	4.1	3.3	1.3	0.1	34.5	64.2
Tjörn	Bohuslän	87.9	6,034	20.6	24.8	17.2	31.3	1.4	4.7	0.0	22.0	73.2
Tomelilla	Kristianstad	87.4	8,342	33.1	39.2	14.8	10.6	0.8	1.3	0.1	33.9	64.6
Torsby	Värmland	90.6	11,274	45.8	28.6	9.7	5.5	8.9	0.8	0.6	54.7	43.9
Torsås	Kalmar	90.2	5,109	31.6	43.6	15.2	5.0	1.3	3.2	0.0	32.9	63.8
Tranemo	Älvsborg	94.8	7,366	36.2	39.4	14.9	7.4	1.2	0.7	0.1	37.5	61.7
Tranås	Jönköping	91.7	12,445	41.5	24.6	13.3	10.8	3.1	6.3	0.3	44.6	48.7
Trelleborg	Malmöhus	92.0	22,144	53.8	24.9	11.4	6.8	1.6	1.1	0.2	55.5	43.1
Trollhättan	Älvsborg	90.1	29,806	51.1	22.0	9.9	10.4	5.0	1.3	0.2	56.1	42.4
Tyresö	Stockholm	92.1	14,307	37.8	23.1	16.4	12.8	8.5	0.7	0.6	46.3	52.3
Täby	Stockholm	91.7	22,593	29.4	21.8	30.0	11.5	5.7	0.8	0.8	35.1	63.3
Töreboda	Skaraborg	89.4	6,581	34.1	39.4	13.8	8.6	2.2	1.8	0.0	36.3	61.9
Uddevalla	Bohuslän	90.1	29,527	44.9	24.6	14.0	11.6	4.0	0.6	0.2	48.9	50.2
Ulricehamn	Älvsborg	93.4	14,319	27.3	39.1	20.1	10.0	1.1	2.3	0.1	28.4	69.1
Umeå	Västerbotten	90.7	46,078	43.1	27.1	9.7	11.5	4.8	2.6	1.2	48.0	48.2
Upplands-Bro	Stockholm	91.7	6,787	43.9	24.1	14.3	8.7	7.5	0.9	0.5	51.5	47.0
Upplands-Väsby	Stockholm	91.3	12,338	42.9	23.6	15.5	9.7	6.5	1.0	0.6	49.5	48.9
Uppsala	Uppsala	89.9	84,592	38.8	25.3	15.4	11.3	6.8	1.5	1.0	45.5	52.0
Uppvidinge	Kronoberg	91.4	7,673	43.4	33.5	10.4	4.3	7.2	1.1	0.2	50.5	48.2
Vaggeryd	Jönköping	94.0	7,287	34.2	31.2	13.9	8.9	3.4	8.0	0.4	37.6	54.0
Valdemarsvik	Östergötland	92.8	5,982	46.5	30.9	11.0	5.3	3.9	2.2	0.2	50.4	47.2
Vallentuna	Stockholm	93.2	7,971	33.0	30.1	20.2	9.5	5.0	1.4	0.7	38.0	59.8
Vansbro	Kopparberg	90.4	5,928	42.8	37.5	5.6	5.0	5.8	3.1	0.2	48.6	48.1
Vara	Skaraborg	91.5	15,224	21.3	44.1	22.0	9.3	1.5	1.7	0.0	22.8	75.5
Varberg	Halland	91.0	26,232	35.5	40.6	13.0	7.0	2.2	1.0	0.5	37.8	60.7
Vaxholm	Stockholm	92.3	13,189	35.7	25.4	22.0	10.9	5.3	0.5	0.3	40.9	58.2
Vellinge	Malmöhus	95.3	10,703	33.5	29.3	27.7	7.5	1.0	0.8	0.2	34.6	64.5
Vetlanda	Jönköping	91.6	18,565	34.3	36.9	12.9	8.5	1.9	5.5	0.1	36.1	58.2
Vilhelmina	Västerbotten	90.6	5,675	48.5	24.2	5.0	12.4	4.1	5.5	0.3	52.6	41.6
Vimmerby	Kalmar	92.3	10,794	35.0	43.0	14.1	3.8	2.2	1.8	0.2	37.2	60.9
Vindeln	Västerbotten	91.0	4,885	34.8	32.5	10.0	16.7	1.5	4.3	0.1	36.3	59.3
Vingåker	Södermanland	92.5	6,142	47.8	26.9	8.0	11.0	3.1	3.1	0.0	50.9	45.9
Vårgårda	Älvsborg	93.1	5,274	22.5	40.8	15.9	17.4	1.0	2.3	0.1	23.5	74.1
Vänersborg	Älvsborg	90.7	21,935	40.8	29.2	13.3	11.5	3.4	1.6	0.2	44.1	54.1
Vännäs	Västerbotten	90.2	7,561	39.3	30.2	10.5	12.9	2.7	3.9	0.5	42.0	53.6
Värmdö	Stockholm	91.5	7,545	46.0	22.1	15.5	8.1	6.5	1.1	0.6	52.5	45.8
Värnamo	Jönköping	93.1	18,716	33.7	33.2	14.5	8.6	2.8	6.8	0.4	36.5	56.3
Västervik	Kalmar	89.8	26,999	48.7	25.7	12.9	5.1	5.5	1.9	0.1	54.2	43.7
Västerås	Västmanland	89.8	69,618	47.8	21.4	12.2	11.2	5.2	1.5	0.7	53.1	44.7
Växjö	Kronoberg	91.1	38,683	38.5	32.5	16.9	6.5	4.0	1.4	0.3	42.4	55.8
Ydre	Östergötland	92.6	2,851	26.3	43.3	10.7	12.5	1.8	5.4	0.1	28.1	66.5
Ystad	Malmöhus	91.8	16,343	48.3	26.3	14.3	9.3	0.9	0.5	0.3	49.2	49.9
Åmål	Älvsborg	90.0	8,773	45.5	29.9	11.7	9.0	2.0	1.6	0.2	47.5	50.7
Ånge	Västernorrland	90.7	9,876	52.1	29.5	3.6	4.6	8.1	1.7	0.4	60.2	37.7
Åre	Jämtland	90.5	6,164	42.0	32.7	8.7	11.4	3.1	2.0	0.2	45.0	52.8
Årjäng	Värmland	84.7	6,211	28.9	41.7	11.1	13.7	1.2	3.0	0.3	30.2	66.5
Åsele	Västerbotten	89.9	6,086	51.8	24.7	4.4	12.2	3.7	2.7	0.4	55.5	41.3
Åstorp	Kristianstad	91.6	6,611	49.7	29.2	13.1	5.4	1.4	1.1	0.0	51.1	47.8
Åtvidaberg	Östergötland	92.9	8,572	55.0	24.6	9.7	5.6	2.0	2.9	0.2	57.0	39.9
Älmhult	Kronoberg	91.6	9,866	42.6	32.5	15.7	4.3	3.2	1.7	0.1	45.8	52.5
Älvdalen	Kopparberg	86.3	5,444	38.9	40.5	4.9	9.0	4.6	1.8	0.4	43.4	54.4
Älvkarleby	Uppsala	92.7	6,525	71.7	14.1	3.8	4.6	5.2	0.5	0.1	76.9	22.4
Älvsbyn	Norrbotten	92.0	5,624	50.8	19.9	3.6	4.5	17.0	4.1	0.2	67.8	27.9
Ängelholm	Kristianstad	90.4	17,737	35.1	35.2	20.4	6.8	1.3	1.0	0.1	36.4	62.4
Öckerö	Bohuslän	90.3	5,379	21.6	20.2	20.6	26.5	1.7	9.1	0.2	23.3	67.4
Ödeshög	Östergötland	91.6	3,932	37.6	37.4	12.2	6.6	1.8	4.2	0.1	39.3	56.3
Örebro	Örebro	90.3	77,604	45.5	24.3	11.9	11.6	3.9	2.2	0.6	49.5	47.7
Örkelljunga	Kristianstad	90.5	5,613	25.4	37.7	22.1	9.0	1.3	4.4	0.0	26.8	68.8
Örnsköldsvik	Västernorrland	92.2	39,794	48.9	29.0	5.7	7.3	4.1	4.6	0.5	52.9	42.0
Östersund	Jämtland	89.5	33,439	44.8	30.3	10.3	8.9	3.7	1.4	0.6	48.5	49.5
Östhammar	Uppsala	89.9	11,404	46.3	32.4	9.3	5.6	4.2	2.0	0.2	50.5	47.2
Östra Göinge	Kristianstad	91.9	9,046	52.1	26.1	10.0	6.3	3.1	2.4	0.1	55.1	42.4
Överkalix	Norrbotten	90.0	3,671	56.8	20.9	3.8	2.2	15.0	0.7	0.6	71.8	26.9
Övertorneå	Norrbotten	89.8	4,174	43.3	31.1	7.7	2.0	13.8	1.0	1.0	57.2	40.8
Total		90.8	5,160,146	43.6	25.1	14.3	9.4	5.3	1.8	0.6	48.9	48.8
Source: SCB

== Results by municipality ==
Votes by municipality. The municipalities are the color of the party that got the most votes within the coalition that won relative majority.

Cartogram of the map to the left with each municipality rescaled to the number of valid votes cast.

Votes by municipality as a scale from red/Left-wing bloc to blue/Centre-right bloc.

Cartogram of vote with each municipality rescaled in proportion to number of valid votes cast. Deeper blue represents a greater relative majority for the centre-right coalition, brighter red represents a greater relative majority for the left-wing coalition.

The listing of the results have been made with the 21st-century county mergers in mind to enable consistency. As a result, the Scanian and West Gothian constituencies that were in separate counties as of 1973 have been listed under their current counties, although the names of the original constituency from 1973 are included. "Share" denotes how large a share of the constituency each municipality had as well as the share of the national vote of 5,168,996 held by the overall constituency.

Counties not in accordance with provinces include the three Småland counties of Jönköping, Kalmar (including Öland) and Kronoberg. From an enlarged perspective, the three provinces of Västergötland, Bohuslän and Dalsland form Västra Götaland. In 1973 those consisted of three separate counties, namely, Bohuslän, Skaraborg and Älvsborg. Skåne County did not exist in 1973 either, with the province divided between Kristianstad County in the north and Malmöhus County in the south. Örebro County is divided between three separate provinces centered around Närke. As a result, Västmanland County is smaller than the province. Stockholm County is also consisting part of the provinces of Södermanland and Uppland, the latter of which forms Uppsala County in its north. Farther north, Gävleborg is a merger between Gästrikland and Hälsingland, Västernorrland consists of Medelpad and Ångermanland, whereas Lapland is divided between Västerbotten and Norrbotten counties. Härjedalen is a single municipality roughly corresponding with the provincial borders, merged into Jämtland County.

=== Blekinge ===
Location	Turnout	Share	Votes	S	C	M	FP	VPK	KDS	Other	L-vote	R-vote	Left	Right	Margin
Location	%	%		%	%	%	%	%	%	%			%	%	
Karlshamn	90.3	20.6	20,270	51.5	21.7	11.5	7.1	6.1	1.7	0.5	11,672	8,161	57.6	40.3	3,511
Karlskrona	90.6	40.4	39,774	48.3	21.6	12.7	11.9	3.3	2.0	0.5	20,524	18,406	51.6	46.3	2,118
Olofström	91.3	9.4	9,214	51.4	23.6	9.4	7.6	4.5	2.9	0.7	5,150	3,744	55.9	40.6	1,406
Ronneby	91.1	19.5	19,163	50.0	26.7	10.7	7.4	4.0	1.0	0.3	10,338	8,591	53.9	44.8	1,747
Sölvesborg	91.5	10.2	10,004	48.2	22.2	14.6	9.8	3.5	1.6	0.0	5,176	4,661	51.7	46.6	515
Total	90.8	1.9	98,425	49.6	22.9	12.0	9.4	4.1	1.8	0.3	52,860	43,563	53.7	44.3	9,297
Source:SCB

=== Dalarna ===
Dalarna County was known as Kopparberg County at the time, but shared the same borders as in the 21st century.

Kopparberg County

Location	Turnout	Share	Votes	S	C	M	FP	VPK	KDS	Other	L-vote	R-vote	Left	Right	Margin
Location	%	%		%	%	%	%	%	%	%			%	%	
Avesta	91.7	9.8	17,543	54.1	26.7	5.2	5.0	6.4	2.0	0.6	10,604	6,475	60.4	36.9	4,129
Borlänge	91.1	15.7	28,033	53.4	28.1	6.5	5.2	4.7	1.6	0.5	16,282	11,153	58.1	39.8	5,129
Falun	89.2	16.9	30,135	40.1	32.1	12.7	9.3	3.8	1.6	0.4	13,231	16,308	43.9	54.1	3,077
Gagnef	92.0	3.2	5,652	42.8	41.5	5.2	5.1	3.0	1.8	0.5	2,590	2,927	45.8	51.8	337
Hedemora	91.0	6.0	10,649	49.3	31.0	7.7	5.5	4.1	2.0	0.4	5,687	4,703	53.4	44.2	984
Leksand	89.5	4.7	8,329	36.5	40.0	9.7	8.8	1.9	2.9	0.3	3,198	4,867	38.4	58.4	1,669
Ludvika	89.0	11.8	21,040	56.6	20.5	6.8	5.1	9.3	1.2	0.6	13,849	6,819	65.8	32.4	7,030
Malung	91.6	4.5	8,101	47.0	31.9	7.7	8.5	3.4	1.4	0.2	4,083	3,890	50.4	48.0	193
Mora	88.6	6.4	11,327	37.3	41.2	10.0	6.6	3.5	1.2	0.2	4,625	6,540	40.8	57.7	1,915
Orsa	86.2	2.5	4,407	37.3	40.4	8.8	5.0	6.2	1.3	0.3	1,920	2,388	43.6	56.0	468
Rättvik	84.9	3.9	6,867	36.6	39.8	8.5	8.0	4.5	2.5	0.1	2,822	3,862	41.1	56.2	1,040
Smedjebacken	91.7	4.6	8,275	61.4	21.2	5.0	5.3	5.7	1.0	0.2	5,556	2,612	67.1	31.6	2,944
Säter	90.5	3.6	6,376	40.4	39.9	7.0	6.5	3.0	2.8	0.4	2,762	3,409	43.3	53.5	647
Vansbro	90.4	3.3	5,928	42.8	37.5	5.6	5.0	5.8	3.1	0.2	2,882	2,852	48.6	48.1	30
Älvdalen	86.3	3.1	5,444	38.9	40.5	4.9	9.0	4.6	1.8	0.4	2,364	2,960	43.4	54.4	596
Total	89.8	3.4	178,106	47.0	31.5	7.9	6.5	4.9	1.8	0.4	92,455	81,765	51.9	45.9	10,690
Source:SCB

=== Gotland ===
Location	Turnout	Share	Votes	S	C	M	FP	VPK	KDS	Other	L-vote	R-vote	Left	Right	Margin
Location	%	%		%	%	%	%	%	%	%			%	%	
Gotland	90.2	100.0	34,186	37.2	39.6	12.7	7.3	1.8	1.0	0.4	13,337	20,348	39.0	59.6	7,041
Total	90.2	0.7	34,186	37.2	39.6	12.7	7.3	1.8	1.0	0.4	13,337	20,348	39.0	59.6	7,041
Source:SCB

=== Gävleborg ===
Location	Turnout	Share	Votes	S	C	M	FP	VPK	KDS	Other	L-vote	R-vote	Left	Right	Margin
Location	%	%		%	%	%	%	%	%	%			%	%	
Bollnäs	89.7	11.5	21,759	42.9	33.3	5.5	8.4	7.4	2.1	0.5	10,945	10,241	50.3	47.1	704
Gävle	88.8	28.4	53,724	53.1	20.6	9.5	8.6	6.2	1.5	0.4	31,865	20,786	59.3	38.7	11,079
Hofors	90.5	4.9	9,197	58.5	16.8	5.3	4.3	13.8	0.7	0.6	6,649	2,435	72.3	26.5	4,214
Hudiksvall	88.7	12.4	23,442	42.0	35.2	6.2	4.8	9.5	1.8	0.6	12,072	10,805	51.5	46.1	1,267
Ljusdal	86.5	7.6	14,397	43.6	31.2	5.1	6.5	11.5	1.7	0.4	7,930	6,162	55.1	42.8	1,768
Nordanstig	89.7	4.1	7,730	39.9	40.0	3.5	6.4	7.4	2.5	0.3	3,650	3,856	47.2	49.9	206
Ockelbo	89.5	2.4	4,455	51.8	32.6	5.4	4.7	4.2	1.2	0.1	2,497	1,899	56.0	42.6	598
Ovanåker	91.2	2.8	5,274	44.5	32.9	5.2	10.0	3.9	3.5	0.0	2,552	2,537	48.4	48.1	15
Sandviken	91.4	14.8	27,992	56.6	21.1	7.4	5.6	7.8	1.1	0.4	18,034	9,536	64.4	34.1	8,498
Söderhamn	91.9	11.2	21,251	55.6	21.0	6.9	4.7	10.5	1.0	0.3	14,048	6,916	66.1	32.5	7,132
Total	89.6	3.7	189,221	50.1	26.0	7.0	6.7	8.2	1.6	0.5	110,242	75,173	58.3	39.7	35,069
Source:SCB

=== Halland ===
Location	Turnout	Share	Votes	S	C	M	FP	VPK	KDS	Other	L-vote	R-vote	Left	Right	Margin
Location	%	%		%	%	%	%	%	%	%			%	%	
Falkenberg	92.9	15.8	21,252	34.3	44.3	13.2	5.8	1.5	0.7	0.1	7,618	13,459	35.8	63.3	5,841
Halmstad	91.3	34.4	46,212	45.0	27.1	14.5	7.7	4.2	1.2	0.2	22,754	22,790	49.2	49.3	36
Hylte	93.9	5.5	7,338	36.9	44.2	11.9	4.6	1.1	0.8	0.3	2,792	4,460	38.0	60.8	1,668
Kungsbacka	92.6	15.2	20,338	27.0	36.5	20.6	12.7	2.2	0.7	0.2	5,931	14,209	29.2	69.9	8,278
Laholm	91.9	9.5	12,714	27.4	54.1	11.5	5.0	1.2	0.6	0.1	3,636	8,982	28.6	70.6	5,346
Varberg	91.0	19.6	26,232	35.5	40.6	13.0	7.0	2.2	1.0	0.5	9,905	15,916	37.8	60.7	6,011
Total	91.9	2.6	134,086	36.6	37.4	14.5	7.6	2.6	0.9	0.3	52,636	79,816	39.3	59.5	27,180
Source:SCB

=== Jämtland ===
Location	Turnout	Share	Votes	S	C	M	FP	VPK	KDS	Other	L-vote	R-vote	Left	Right	Margin
Location	%	%		%	%	%	%	%	%	%			%	%	
Berg	87.2	6.9	5,978	38.9	40.7	7.9	6.8	3.6	1.5	0.5	2,539	3,317	42.5	55.5	778
Bräcke	92.1	7.6	6,582	56.5	27.1	6.3	4.6	4.4	0.9	0.2	4,012	2,502	61.0	38.0	1,510
Härjedalen	85.8	9.6	8,298	55.6	25.3	5.4	6.1	6.1	1.1	0.5	5,119	3,049	61.7	36.7	2,070
Krokom	88.9	9.9	8,559	44.5	34.6	7.6	7.6	3.0	2.4	0.4	4,069	4,258	47.5	49.7	189
Ragunda	91.5	6.3	5,468	55.5	27.7	7.0	4.0	4.5	1.2	0.1	3,281	2,117	60.0	38.7	1,164
Strömsund	90.8	14.2	12,286	54.8	28.0	5.1	4.7	5.4	1.5	0.6	7,389	4,644	60.1	37.8	2,745
Åre	90.5	7.1	6,164	42.0	32.7	8.7	11.4	3.1	2.0	0.2	2,775	3,256	45.0	52.8	481
Östersund	89.5	38.5	33,439	44.8	30.3	10.3	8.9	3.7	1.4	0.6	16,216	16,553	48.5	49.5	337
Total	89.5	1.7	86,774	48.2	30.4	8.0	7.3	4.2	1.5	0.5	45,400	39,696	52.3	45.7	5,704
Source:SCB

=== Jönköping ===
Location	Turnout	Share	Votes	S	C	M	FP	VPK	KDS	Other	L-vote	R-vote	Left	Right	Margin
Location	%	%		%	%	%	%	%	%	%			%	%	
Aneby	91.6	2.1	4,135	26.1	37.3	14.8	12.2	1.1	8.6	0.0	1,122	2,657	27.1	64.3	1,535
Eksjö	91.6	6.2	12,049	34.3	33.2	14.7	10.8	1.6	5.1	0.4	4,325	7,063	35.9	58.6	2,738
Gislaved	93.7	8.4	16,201	37.1	36.4	12.6	8.9	1.9	2.9	0.1	6,332	9,372	39.1	57.8	3,040
Gnosjö	95.3	2.5	4,842	29.2	35.8	14.9	9.7	2.0	8.3	0.1	1,511	2,925	31.2	60.4	1,414
Jönköping	92.1	35.8	69,139	42.1	22.9	15.0	10.7	3.4	5.6	0.4	31,490	33,554	45.5	48.5	2,064
Nässjö	92.5	11.4	21,994	42.8	27.3	12.0	9.7	3.6	4.1	0.4	10,206	10,797	46.4	49.1	591
Sävsjö	91.5	3.9	7,510	25.5	40.0	17.3	9.3	1.8	6.0	0.1	2,050	4,999	27.3	66.6	2,949
Tranås	91.7	6.5	12,445	41.5	24.6	13.3	10.8	3.1	6.3	0.3	5,552	6,066	44.6	48.7	514
Vaggeryd	94.0	3.8	7,287	34.2	31.2	13.9	8.9	3.4	8.0	0.4	2,743	3,934	37.6	54.0	1,191
Vetlanda	91.6	9.6	18,565	34.3	36.9	12.9	8.5	1.9	5.5	0.1	6,709	10,810	36.1	58.2	4,101
Värnamo	93.1	9.7	18,716	33.7	33.2	14.5	8.6	2.8	6.8	0.4	6,833	10,533	36.5	56.3	3,700
Total	92.4	3.7	192,883	38.1	29.2	14.1	9.9	2.8	5.5	0.3	78,873	102,710	40.9	53.2	23,837
Source:SCB

=== Kalmar ===
Location	Turnout	Share	Votes	S	C	M	FP	VPK	KDS	Other	L-vote	R-vote	Left	Right	Margin
Location	%	%		%	%	%	%	%	%	%			%	%	
Borgholm	90.7	4.5	7,085	25.7	50.1	13.7	4.9	2.2	2.4	0.2	1,977	4,862	27.9	68.6	2,885
Emmaboda	92.0	4.7	7,462	45.5	35.0	10.1	4.1	3.7	1.4	0.2	3,668	3,667	49.2	49.1	1
Hultsfred	92.0	7.8	12,254	42.7	31.5	13.5	5.5	3.0	3.8	0.1	5,602	6,178	45.7	50.4	576
Högsby	92.8	3.6	5,636	44.4	30.3	13.3	4.4	3.9	3.8	0.1	2,719	2,701	48.2	47.9	18
Kalmar	90.9	22.0	34,510	45.8	23.5	18.3	7.0	3.6	1.6	0.3	17,041	16,811	49.4	48.7	230
Mönsterås	91.4	5.4	8,540	47.7	25.9	12.7	4.3	5.5	3.7	0.1	4,543	3,672	53.2	43.0	871
Mörbylånga	92.0	4.4	6,857	34.3	39.2	16.8	6.8	1.8	1.0	0.0	2,481	4,309	36.2	62.8	1,828
Nybro	91.9	9.1	14,279	45.0	31.3	12.2	3.8	5.0	2.5	0.1	7,145	6,765	50.0	47.4	380
Oskarshamn	91.1	11.2	17,601	49.9	22.9	12.8	6.7	4.1	3.3	0.4	9,501	7,448	54.0	42.3	2,053
Torsås	90.2	3.3	5,109	31.6	43.6	15.2	5.0	1.3	3.2	0.0	1,682	3,261	32.9	63.8	1,579
Vimmerby	92.3	6.9	10,794	35.0	43.0	14.1	3.8	2.2	1.8	0.2	4,015	6,569	37.2	60.9	2,554
Västervik	89.8	17.2	26,999	48.7	25.7	12.9	5.1	5.5	1.9	0.1	14,629	11,799	54.2	43.7	2,830
Total	91.2	3.0	157,126	43.9	29.9	14.3	5.5	3.9	2.4	0.2	75,003	78,042	47.7	49.7	3,039
Source:SCB

=== Kronoberg ===
Location	Turnout	Share	Votes	S	C	M	FP	VPK	KDS	Other	L-vote	R-vote	Left	Right	Margin
Location	%	%		%	%	%	%	%	%	%			%	%	
Alvesta	90.8	11.0	11,775	36.7	38.1	14.0	5.6	3.4	1.9	0.1	4,724	6,803	40.1	57.8	2,079
Lessebo	94.3	5.3	5,692	56.0	22.9	9.0	3.7	7.2	1.0	0.2	3,597	2,024	63.2	35.6	1,573
Ljungby	90.4	15.4	16,475	33.9	38.7	14.4	7.1	3.0	2.7	0.3	6,082	9,901	36.9	60.1	3,819
Markaryd	91.5	6.7	7,219	42.0	33.7	11.3	5.7	3.7	3.4	0.1	3,297	3,667	45.7	50.8	370
Tingsryd	89.0	9.1	9,753	31.2	43.1	16.9	4.1	3.3	1.3	0.1	3,361	6,259	34.5	64.2	2,898
Uppvidinge	91.4	7.2	7,673	43.4	33.5	10.4	4.3	7.2	1.1	0.2	3,876	3,699	50.5	48.2	177
Växjö	91.1	36.1	38,683	38.5	32.5	16.9	6.5	4.0	1.4	0.3	16,418	21,600	42.4	55.8	5,182
Älmhult	91.6	9.2	9,866	42.6	32.5	15.7	4.3	3.2	1.7	0.1	4,520	5,176	45.8	52.5	656
Total	91.0	2.1	107,136	38.8	34.7	14.8	5.7	4.0	1.7	0.1	45,875	59,129	42.8	55.2	13,254
Source:SCB

=== Norrbotten ===
Location	Turnout	Share	Votes	S	C	M	FP	VPK	KDS	Other	L-vote	R-vote	Left	Right	Margin
Location	%	%		%	%	%	%	%	%	%			%	%	
Arjeplog	86.6	1.7	2,706	45.9	19.6	3.7	5.1	22.9	2.3	0.5	1,863	768	68.8	28.4	1,095
Arvidsjaur	90.3	3.5	5,512	51.4	18.5	5.4	5.9	15.8	2.1	0.9	3,703	1,642	67.2	29.8	2,061
Boden	90.1	11.3	17,806	52.4	18.2	10.1	6.6	9.4	2.7	0.5	11,011	6,213	61.8	34.9	4,798
Gällivare	86.6	9.4	14,719	48.8	13.5	10.6	3.6	20.7	0.7	2.2	10,223	4,072	69.5	27.7	6,151
Haparanda	89.3	3.1	4,938	46.2	24.6	13.8	3.6	10.8	0.7	0.3	2,816	2,070	57.0	41.9	746
Jokkmokk	84.1	3.0	4,684	54.0	14.5	6.3	5.7	17.7	1.5	0.3	3,359	1,245	71.7	26.6	2,114
Kalix	93.1	7.6	11,897	61.1	18.3	7.1	3.3	8.5	1.0	0.7	8,276	3,421	69.6	28.8	4,855
Kiruna	83.5	10.1	15,875	52.2	12.8	6.6	6.6	19.9	1.3	0.5	11,447	4,130	72.1	26.0	7,317
Luleå	90.9	23.9	37,685	50.2	19.7	9.9	6.8	10.7	1.9	0.8	22,951	13,715	60.9	36.4	9,236
Pajala	88.4	3.9	6,065	44.6	17.6	7.7	3.2	24.2	2.3	0.2	4,174	1,733	68.8	28.6	2,441
Piteå	92.9	14.0	22,027	57.4	20.5	5.4	3.7	8.3	4.3	0.4	14,473	6,523	65.7	29.6	7,950
Älvsbyn	92.0	3.6	5,624	50.8	19.9	3.6	4.5	17.0	4.1	0.2	3,812	1,571	67.8	27.9	2,241
Överkalix	90.0	2.3	3,671	56.8	20.9	3.8	2.2	15.0	0.7	0.6	2,634	988	71.8	26.9	1,646
Övertorneå	89.8	2.7	4,174	43.3	31.1	7.7	2.0	13.8	1.0	1.0	2,386	1,703	57.2	40.8	683
Total	89.6	3.0	157,383	52.1	18.5	8.1	5.1	13.5	2.1	0.8	103,128	49,794	65.5	31.6	53,334
Source:SCB

=== Skåne ===
The province of Skåne, later unified into one county, was divided into Malmöhus and Kristianstad counties at the time, also resulting in three separate constituencies, one for each county and a third for the metropolitan area of Öresund, that was part of Malmöhus.

==== Four-city constituency ====
(Swedish: Fyrstadskretsen)

Location	Turnout	Share	Votes	S	C	M	FP	VPK	KDS	Other	L-vote	R-vote	Left	Right	Margin
Location	%	%		%	%	%	%	%	%	%			%	%	
Helsingborg	90.6	21.6	65,180	46.1	20.8	20.0	8.2	3.5	1.0	0.5	32,306	31,907	49.6	49.0	399
Landskrona	92.1	8.0	24,196	57.9	18.5	13.7	6.5	2.4	0.8	0.2	14,595	9,346	60.3	38.6	5,249
Lund	92.5	15.7	47,369	39.4	24.6	19.8	8.4	6.4	0.7	0.6	21,707	25,028	45.8	52.8	3,321
Malmö	90.7	54.7	165,282	49.2	19.6	19.3	7.2	3.6	0.6	0.5	87,278	76,221	52.8	46.1	11,057
Total	91.1	5.9	302,027	47.7	20.5	19.1	7.6	3.9	0.7	0.5	155,886	142,502	51.6	47.2	13,384
Source:SCB

==== Kristianstad ====
Location	Turnout	Share	Votes	S	C	M	FP	VPK	KDS	Other	L-vote	R-vote	Left	Right	Margin
Location	%	%		%	%	%	%	%	%	%			%	%	
Bromölla	92.0	3.9	6,690	62.1	17.1	7.1	6.2	6.2	1.1	0.2	4,570	2,036	68.3	30.4	2,534
Båstad	90.6	4.1	7,146	21.1	47.7	20.4	8.9	0.9	1.0	0.0	1,569	5,500	22.0	77.0	3,931
Hässleholm	90.5	17.7	30,532	36.0	36.5	13.6	9.1	2.0	2.6	0.0	11,627	18,082	38.1	59.2	6,455
Klippan	90.8	6.0	10,325	41.9	35.2	14.1	6.4	1.7	0.5	0.1	4,508	5,756	43.7	55.7	1,248
Kristianstad	91.2	25.4	43,881	45.9	26.6	13.9	9.5	2.3	1.6	0.2	21,175	21,953	48.3	50.0	778
Osby	91.5	5.2	8,972	43.5	32.9	11.0	6.5	3.6	2.5	0.0	4,222	4,523	47.1	50.4	301
Perstorp	91.7	2.6	4,443	44.3	30.5	13.3	7.2	2.7	2.0	0.1	2,088	2,262	47.0	50.9	174
Simrishamn	87.9	7.6	13,191	39.5	32.5	15.8	9.7	1.4	0.9	0.2	5,391	7,662	40.9	58.1	2,271
Tomelilla	87.4	4.8	8,342	33.1	39.2	14.8	10.6	0.8	1.3	0.1	2,828	5,391	33.9	64.6	2,563
Åstorp	91.6	3.8	6,611	49.7	29.2	13.1	5.4	1.4	1.1	0.0	3,380	3,158	51.1	47.8	222
Ängelholm	90.4	10.3	17,737	35.1	35.2	20.4	6.8	1.3	1.0	0.1	6,464	11,066	36.4	62.4	4,602
Örkelljunga	90.5	3.3	5,613	25.4	37.7	22.1	9.0	1.3	4.4	0.0	1,502	3,863	26.8	68.8	2,361
Östra Göinge	91.9	5.2	9,046	52.1	26.1	10.0	6.3	3.1	2.4	0.1	4,985	3,840	55.1	42.4	1,145
Total	90.6	3.7	172,529	40.9	32.2	14.6	8.3	2.1	1.7	0.1	74,309	95,092	43.1	55.1	20,783
Source:SCB

==== Malmöhus County ====
Location	Turnout	Share	Votes	S	C	M	FP	VPK	KDS	Other	L-vote	R-vote	Left	Right	Margin
Location	%	%		%	%	%	%	%	%	%			%	%	
Bara	94.7	1.6	2,717	39.8	34.2	17.3	7.1	1.1	0.5	0.0	988	1,416	40.9	58.6	428
Bjuv	93.3	4.8	8,064	59.8	23.2	8.6	5.3	2.3	0.6	0.1	5,009	2,994	62.1	37.1	2,015
Burlöv	93.4	4.8	8,066	54.2	22.2	13.3	7.0	3.0	0.2	0.2	4,608	3,426	57.1	42.5	1,182
Eslöv	91.2	10.0	16,685	44.7	34.9	11.5	6.7	1.1	0.8	0.3	7,644	8,859	45.8	53.1	1,215
Höganäs	93.2	7.8	13,028	43.0	23.5	22.9	7.9	1.3	1.1	0.4	5,766	7,067	44.3	54.2	1,301
Hörby	90.6	4.6	7,760	24.0	48.2	10.4	13.3	0.8	3.0	0.2	1,930	5,583	24.9	71.9	3,653
Höör	90.8	3.7	6,133	29.4	40.7	16.7	9.8	1.5	1.9	0.1	1,896	4,115	30.9	67.1	2,219
Kävlinge	94.2	6.2	10,389	51.8	29.9	9.9	6.4	1.5	0.3	0.1	5,543	4,810	53.4	46.3	733
Lomma	95.2	5.3	8,842	40.8	26.8	22.6	7.9	1.6	0.3	0.0	3,754	5,061	42.5	57.2	1,307
Sjöbo	90.1	5.3	8,924	32.4	47.4	11.1	7.7	0.8	0.5	0.1	2,956	5,904	33.1	66.2	2,948
Skurup	91.8	4.3	7,227	40.5	41.5	9.5	6.4	0.8	1.0	0.3	2,989	4,148	41.4	57.4	1,159
Staffanstorp	95.2	4.8	8,047	37.8	33.6	19.8	7.1	1.4	0.2	0.0	3,154	4,870	39.2	60.5	1,716
Svalöv	92.7	4.8	8,006	42.6	38.9	11.0	5.3	1.5	0.7	0.0	3,531	4,418	44.1	55.2	887
Svedala	94.0	2.8	4,646	53.9	27.7	10.3	5.1	1.3	1.5	0.2	2,566	2,003	55.2	43.1	563
Trelleborg	92.0	13.2	22,144	53.8	24.9	11.4	6.8	1.6	1.1	0.2	12,284	9,549	55.5	43.1	2,735
Vellinge	95.3	6.4	10,703	33.5	29.3	27.7	7.5	1.0	0.8	0.2	3,698	6,901	34.6	64.5	3,203
Ystad	91.8	9.8	16,343	48.3	26.3	14.3	9.3	0.9	0.5	0.3	8,045	8,157	49.2	49.9	112
Total	92.7	3.2	167,424	44.2	31.3	14.6	7.5	1.4	0.9	0.2	76,361	89,281	45.6	53.3	12,920
Source:SCB

=== Stockholm ===
Stockholm County was divided into Stockholm Municipality and the surrounding county of suburbs or more rural areas.

==== Stockholm (city) ====
Location	Turnout	Share	Votes	S	C	M	FP	VPK	KDS	Other	L-vote	R-vote	Left	Right	Margin
Location	%	%		%	%	%	%	%	%	%			%	%	
Stockholm	89.1	100.0	469,386	39.4	14.8	23.3	11.2	9.2	1.0	0.9	227,954	231,964	48.6	49.4	4,010
Total	89.1	9.1	469,386	39.4	14.8	23.3	11.2	9.2	1.0	0.9	227,954	231,964	48.6	49.4	4,010
Source:SCB

==== Stockholm County ====
Location	Turnout	Share	Votes	S	C	M	FP	VPK	KDS	Other	L-vote	R-vote	Left	Right	Margin
Location	%	%		%	%	%	%	%	%	%			%	%	
Botkyrka	91.6	6.5	29,362	41.9	23.1	15.1	10.8	7.3	0.8	1.1	14,446	14,360	49.2	48.9	86
Danderyd	94.5	4.0	17,866	20.0	15.9	47.0	11.8	4.1	0.7	0.6	4,303	13,331	24.1	74.6	9,028
Ekerö	94.2	1.8	8,086	33.1	24.8	23.9	11.9	5.2	1.0	0.3	3,090	4,894	38.2	60.5	1,804
Haninge	90.3	5.6	25,285	41.1	25.9	12.7	10.0	8.5	0.6	1.2	12,547	12,281	49.6	48.6	266
Huddinge	91.4	7.2	32,752	40.4	23.7	15.1	10.3	8.7	1.0	0.8	16,053	16,101	49.0	49.2	48
Järfälla	93.0	6.3	28,585	38.5	22.3	18.9	12.0	6.5	1.1	0.6	12,863	15,211	45.0	53.2	2,348
Lidingö	93.2	4.9	22,265	23.6	16.8	40.9	11.9	5.2	0.5	1.0	6,417	15,507	28.8	69.6	9,090
Nacka	91.9	6.6	29,957	35.4	17.9	26.0	11.5	7.7	0.7	0.9	12,909	16,568	43.1	55.3	3,659
Norrtälje	89.8	5.3	24,160	41.5	30.8	13.8	7.7	3.9	2.1	0.2	10,966	12,638	45.4	52.3	1,672
Nynäshamn	92.1	2.6	11,610	52.0	23.2	8.8	7.5	7.1	1.0	0.3	6,855	4,596	59.0	39.6	2,259
Sigtuna	91.0	3.2	14,557	40.7	27.3	14.9	9.7	6.3	0.7	0.5	6,843	7,547	47.0	51.8	704
Sollentuna	93.2	5.4	24,254	35.1	23.3	21.9	11.0	6.3	1.5	0.8	10,069	13,649	41.5	56.3	3,580
Solna	90.2	8.2	36,909	38.6	16.6	22.8	11.5	8.2	1.1	1.3	17,309	18,777	46.9	50.9	1,468
Sundbyberg	90.5	4.3	19,413	48.8	16.9	14.0	9.6	9.0	0.6	1.1	11,220	7,866	57.8	40.5	3,354
Södertälje	90.2	9.4	42,332	46.0	23.2	13.9	8.1	6.5	1.5	0.7	22,227	19,141	52.5	45.2	3,086
Tyresö	92.1	3.2	14,307	37.8	23.1	16.4	12.8	8.5	0.7	0.6	6,624	7,484	46.3	52.3	860
Täby	91.7	5.0	22,593	29.4	21.8	30.0	11.5	5.7	0.8	0.8	7,937	14,311	35.1	63.3	6,374
Upplands-Bro	91.7	1.5	6,787	43.9	24.1	14.3	8.7	7.5	0.9	0.5	3,493	3,190	51.5	47.0	303
Upplands-Väsby	91.3	2.7	12,338	42.9	23.6	15.5	9.7	6.5	1.0	0.6	6,104	6,036	49.5	48.9	68
Vallentuna	93.2	1.8	7,971	33.0	30.1	20.2	9.5	5.0	1.4	0.7	3,032	4,770	38.0	59.8	1,738
Vaxholm	92.3	2.9	13,189	35.7	25.4	22.0	10.9	5.3	0.5	0.3	5,399	7,678	40.9	58.2	2,279
Värmdö	91.5	1.7	7,545	46.0	22.1	15.5	8.1	6.5	1.1	0.6	3,963	3,453	52.5	45.8	510
Total	91.6	8.8	452,123	38.5	22.2	20.3	10.4	6.8	1.0	0.8	204,669	239,389	45.3	52.9	34,720
Source:SCB

=== Södermanland ===
Location	Turnout	Share	Votes	S	C	M	FP	VPK	KDS	Other	L-vote	R-vote	Left	Right	Margin
Location	%	%		%	%	%	%	%	%	%			%	%	
Eskilstuna	91.5	35.7	55,242	52.3	19.9	10.3	11.0	4.5	1.6	0.4	31,404	22,743	56.8	41.2	8,661
Flen	93.5	7.4	11,513	49.4	26.8	10.6	8.0	3.2	1.8	0.2	6,058	5,230	52.6	45.4	828
Katrineholm	92.4	13.8	21,323	52.2	23.6	10.3	8.9	2.3	2.4	0.3	11,624	9,120	54.5	42.8	2,504
Nyköping	92.5	25.1	38,826	49.0	26.5	12.4	6.6	3.2	2.0	0.4	20,263	17,622	52.2	45.4	2,641
Oxelösund	92.2	5.1	7,945	61.6	15.7	7.6	6.3	7.3	0.9	0.6	5,480	2,351	69.0	29.6	3,129
Strängnäs	92.5	8.9	13,741	43.0	24.6	15.5	11.9	3.1	1.5	0.4	6,336	7,143	46.1	52.0	807
Vingåker	92.5	4.0	6,142	47.8	26.9	8.0	11.0	3.1	3.1	0.0	3,128	2,818	50.9	45.9	310
Total	92.2	3.0	154,732	50.7	23.0	11.1	9.2	3.7	1.8	0.3	84,293	67,027	54.5	43.3	17,266
Source:SCB

=== Uppsala ===
Location	Turnout	Share	Votes	S	C	M	FP	VPK	KDS	Other	L-vote	R-vote	Left	Right	Margin
Location	%	%		%	%	%	%	%	%	%			%	%	
Enköping	89.5	13.7	19,185	42.4	33.6	12.4	7.0	3.0	1.5	0.1	8,708	10,169	45.4	53.0	1,461
Håbo	92.8	3.0	4,168	42.0	28.9	13.5	9.6	5.2	0.6	0.2	1,967	2,168	47.2	52.0	201
Tierp	92.3	10.0	14,000	53.2	28.1	5.6	7.6	2.6	2.8	0.1	7,810	5,778	55.8	41.3	2,032
Uppsala	89.9	60.5	84,592	38.8	25.3	15.4	11.3	6.8	1.5	1.0	38,508	43,972	45.5	52.0	5,464
Älvkarleby	92.7	4.7	6,525	71.7	14.1	3.8	4.6	5.2	0.5	0.1	5,018	1,461	76.9	22.4	3,557
Östhammar	89.9	8.2	11,404	46.3	32.4	9.3	5.6	4.2	2.0	0.2	5,756	5,388	50.5	47.2	368
Total	90.3	2.7	139,874	43.0	26.9	12.9	9.5	5.5	1.5	0.7	67,767	68,936	48.4	49.3	1,169
Source:SCB

=== Värmland ===
Location	Turnout	Share	Votes	S	C	M	FP	VPK	KDS	Other	L-vote	R-vote	Left	Right	Margin
Location	%	%		%	%	%	%	%	%	%			%	%	
Arvika	89.9	9.7	18,314	44.5	27.2	8.9	12.5	5.8	0.7	0.4	9,212	8,898	50.3	48.6	314
Eda	91.3	3.4	6,496	51.3	28.8	7.9	7.1	3.6	1.1	0.1	3,570	2,847	55.0	43.8	723
Filipstad	91.3	5.5	10,436	61.2	16.3	7.9	6.8	6.9	0.6	0.3	7,110	3,239	68.1	31.0	3,871
Forshaga	93.8	3.6	6,823	59.4	22.3	6.4	6.6	4.0	1.2	0.1	4,325	2,407	63.4	35.3	1,918
Grums	92.1	3.7	6,925	56.6	25.2	5.6	5.5	5.5	1.2	0.4	4,302	2,515	62.1	36.3	1,787
Hagfors	93.6	6.9	13,011	61.3	20.0	5.4	3.8	8.2	0.8	0.4	9,046	3,803	69.5	29.2	5,243
Hammarö	93.8	3.8	7,077	60.1	17.5	8.4	7.6	5.5	0.3	0.6	4,645	2,369	65.6	33.5	2,276
Karlstad	92.0	25.4	47,969	45.0	24.3	15.0	10.1	4.2	0.8	0.6	23,585	23,689	49.2	49.4	104
Kil	92.8	3.0	5,719	39.0	31.6	10.5	15.0	3.0	0.6	0.4	2,403	3,261	42.0	57.0	858
Kristinehamn	91.6	9.6	18,158	49.7	21.9	11.6	10.0	5.3	1.3	0.2	9,996	7,893	55.1	43.5	2,103
Munkfors	94.6	2.1	3,933	67.7	15.5	4.4	6.3	4.7	1.0	0.4	2,846	1,031	72.4	26.2	1,815
Storfors	94.6	1.9	3,506	60.9	20.8	8.4	5.1	3.3	1.0	0.4	2,251	1,203	64.2	34.3	1,048
Sunne	92.2	5.1	9,650	33.8	41.9	12.5	9.3	1.7	0.6	0.1	3,431	6,145	35.6	63.7	2,714
Säffle	90.5	6.9	13,063	38.9	37.0	11.1	7.8	3.6	1.6	0.1	5,550	7,295	42.5	55.8	1,745
Torsby	90.6	6.0	11,274	45.8	28.6	9.7	5.5	8.9	0.8	0.6	6,170	4,945	54.7	43.9	1,225
Årjäng	84.7	3.3	6,211	28.9	41.7	11.1	13.7	1.2	3.0	0.3	1,873	4,132	30.2	66.5	2,259
Total	91.6	3.6	188,565	48.3	26.0	10.5	8.8	4.9	1.0	0.4	100,315	85,672	53.2	45.4	14,643
Source:SCB

=== Västerbotten ===
Location	Turnout	Share	Votes	S	C	M	FP	VPK	KDS	Other	L-vote	R-vote	Left	Right	Margin
Location	%	%		%	%	%	%	%	%	%			%	%	
Lycksele	89.8	6.2	9,245	46.5	18.2	7.1	16.2	3.0	8.4	0.5	4,574	3,841	49.5	41.5	733
Nordmaling	92.2	3.5	5,312	44.2	29.9	9.7	10.5	1.2	4.3	0.2	2,411	2,659	45.4	50.1	248
Norsjö	87.0	4.3	6,499	46.1	24.0	6.2	13.9	5.5	3.8	0.6	3,352	2,865	51.6	44.1	487
Robertsfors	92.7	3.4	5,036	33.3	40.6	7.7	13.0	1.4	3.7	0.2	1,749	3,090	34.7	61.4	1,341
Skellefteå	89.9	30.6	45,977	49.4	24.8	8.6	9.1	3.8	3.7	0.5	24,462	19,536	53.2	42.5	4,926
Sorsele	87.0	1.7	2,625	41.3	22.2	5.0	17.1	4.9	9.3	0.3	1,212	1,163	46.2	44.3	49
Storuman	86.6	3.4	5,057	38.7	23.0	9.5	17.2	3.6	7.6	0.5	2,139	2,512	42.3	49.7	373
Umeå	90.7	30.7	46,078	43.1	27.1	9.7	11.5	4.8	2.6	1.2	22,098	22,220	48.0	48.2	122
Vilhelmina	90.6	3.8	5,675	48.5	24.2	5.0	12.4	4.1	5.5	0.3	2,986	2,362	52.6	41.6	624
Vindeln	91.0	3.3	4,885	34.8	32.5	10.0	16.7	1.5	4.3	0.1	1,772	2,897	36.3	59.3	1,125
Vännäs	90.2	5.0	7,561	39.3	30.2	10.5	12.9	2.7	3.9	0.5	3,174	4,055	42.0	53.6	881
Åsele	89.9	4.1	6,086	51.8	24.7	4.4	12.2	3.7	2.7	0.4	3,379	2,514	55.5	41.3	865
Total	90.1	2.9	150,036	45.0	26.2	8.5	11.8	3.9	4.0	0.7	73,308	69,714	48.9	46.5	3,594
Source:SCB

=== Västernorrland ===
Location	Turnout	Share	Votes	S	C	M	FP	VPK	KDS	Other	L-vote	R-vote	Left	Right	Margin
Location	%	%		%	%	%	%	%	%	%			%	%	
Härnösand	92.5	10.4	18,561	43.9	33.7	10.0	5.5	5.0	1.5	0.4	9,060	9,135	48.8	49.2	75
Kramfors	93.8	11.4	20,449	54.3	27.1	4.6	2.6	8.9	1.8	0.6	12,941	7,004	63.3	34.3	5,937
Sollefteå	92.8	10.5	18,790	54.8	27.9	6.6	2.2	6.1	1.8	0.4	11,457	6,909	61.0	36.8	4,548
Sundsvall	91.2	33.4	59,630	49.7	25.6	8.3	7.1	6.9	1.7	0.5	33,770	24,476	56.6	41.0	9,294
Timrå	91.9	6.5	11,688	58.4	23.7	3.5	4.6	7.6	2.0	0.3	7,716	3,713	66.0	31.8	4,003
Ånge	90.7	5.5	9,876	52.1	29.5	3.6	4.6	8.1	1.7	0.4	5,945	3,725	60.2	37.7	2,220
Örnsköldsvik	92.2	22.3	39,794	48.9	29.0	5.7	7.3	4.1	4.6	0.5	21,070	16,694	52.9	42.0	4,376
Total	92.1	3.5	178,788	50.7	27.7	6.7	5.6	6.3	2.4	0.5	101,959	71,656	57.0	40.1	30,303
Source:SCB

=== Västmanland ===
Location	Turnout	Share	Votes	S	C	M	FP	VPK	KDS	Other	L-vote	R-vote	Left	Right	Margin
Location	%	%		%	%	%	%	%	%	%			%	%	
Arboga	91.6	6.1	9,486	50.7	24.4	10.3	9.1	4.3	1.0	0.2	5,214	4,165	55.0	43.9	1,049
Fagersta	92.3	6.3	9,812	61.4	16.5	8.1	7.3	5.4	0.8	0.6	6,554	3,128	66.8	31.9	3,426
Hallstahammar	91.9	6.7	10,459	59.8	17.9	7.2	6.9	6.7	1.1	0.4	6,953	3,343	66.5	32.0	3,610
Heby	89.4	5.4	8,366	42.2	38.9	5.2	7.0	4.7	1.3	0.4	3,928	4,280	47.0	51.2	352
Kungsör	92.6	3.2	4,931	49.7	24.9	7.9	10.5	5.6	1.1	0.3	2,723	2,137	55.2	43.3	586
Köping	90.5	10.4	16,091	54.1	23.6	7.3	6.7	5.3	2.2	0.8	9,568	6,042	59.5	37.5	3,526
Norberg	91.5	2.7	4,245	62.5	17.9	6.8	4.5	6.5	1.3	0.4	2,932	1,239	69.1	29.2	1,693
Sala	91.2	8.4	13,129	40.1	36.6	9.8	8.8	3.1	1.2	0.4	5,675	7,245	43.2	55.2	1,570
Skinnskatteberg	91.6	2.1	3,201	62.0	20.0	6.2	4.5	5.2	1.4	0.8	2,150	980	67.2	30.6	1,170
Surahammar	93.9	3.9	6,080	65.4	15.1	5.2	5.0	7.6	1.3	0.3	4,439	1,540	73.0	25.3	2,899
Västerås	89.8	44.8	69,618	47.8	21.4	12.2	11.2	5.2	1.5	0.7	36,942	31,146	53.1	44.7	5,796
Total	90.7	3.0	155,418	50.8	23.2	9.7	9.0	5.2	1.4	0.5	87,078	65,245	56.0	42.0	21,833
Source:SCB

=== Västra Götaland ===
The later iteration of Västra Götaland County was divided into three separate counties and five constituencies in 1973. The three counties were Gothenburg and Bohuslän, Skaraborg and Älvsborg. Gothenburg/Bohus were divided into one constituency representing Gothenburg Municipality and one representing Bohuslän, whereas Älvsborg was divided into two constituencies, one in the north and one in the south. Skaraborg had one constituency for the whole county.

==== Bohuslän ====
Location	Turnout	Share	Votes	S	C	M	FP	VPK	KDS	Other	L-vote	R-vote	Left	Right	Margin
Location	%	%		%	%	%	%	%	%	%			%	%	
Härryda	92.2	6.9	11,211	34.1	26.7	16.5	16.5	5.2	0.7	0.4	4,400	6,681	39.2	59.6	2,281
Kungälv	92.3	10.1	16,358	36.2	28.5	16.9	13.4	3.5	1.3	0.4	6,485	9,612	39.6	58.8	3,127
Lysekil	91.0	5.7	9,253	52.7	15.2	13.0	14.8	3.1	0.7	0.5	5,166	3,976	55.8	43.0	1,190
Munkedal	90.2	4.0	6,508	37.5	34.8	14.7	10.0	2.0	0.9	0.1	2,571	3,872	39.5	59.5	1,301
Mölndal	90.8	17.2	27,842	38.9	20.7	14.4	17.2	6.9	1.2	0.6	12,750	14,582	45.8	52.4	1,832
Orust	87.2	3.8	6,097	28.1	35.9	16.0	17.9	1.5	0.5	0.1	1,805	4,255	29.6	66.8	2,450
Partille	92.7	9.9	16,043	35.5	19.2	17.1	19.5	6.7	1.5	0.5	6,777	8,944	42.2	55.8	2,167
Sotenäs	90.2	3.9	6,370	46.3	19.1	11.3	20.2	2.0	1.1	0.1	3,074	3,221	48.3	50.6	147
Stenungsund	89.8	4.7	7,638	34.9	31.5	14.7	14.3	3.9	0.2	0.4	2,961	4,625	38.8	60.6	1,664
Strömstad	87.2	3.8	6,140	43.2	29.0	10.9	13.6	1.6	1.5	0.1	2,755	3,283	44.9	53.5	528
Tanum	87.7	4.4	7,183	26.5	40.0	16.8	15.2	0.9	0.5	0.1	1,967	5,171	27.4	72.0	3,204
Tjörn	87.9	3.7	6,034	20.6	24.8	17.2	31.3	1.4	4.7	0.0	1,328	4,417	22.0	73.2	3,089
Uddevalla	90.1	18.3	29,527	44.9	24.6	14.0	11.6	4.0	0.6	0.2	14,436	14,837	48.9	50.2	401
Öckerö	90.3	3.3	5,379	21.6	20.2	20.6	26.5	1.7	9.1	0.2	1,252	3,626	23.3	67.4	2,374
Total	90.5	3.1	161,583	37.8	25.1	15.2	16.2	4.1	1.4	0.4	67,727	91,102	41.9	56.4	23,375
Source:SCB

==== Gothenburg ====
Location	Turnout	Share	Votes	S	C	M	FP	VPK	KDS	Other	L-vote	R-vote	Left	Right	Margin
Location	%	%		%	%	%	%	%	%	%			%	%	
Gothenburg	88.9	100.0	282,771	38.2	15.8	16.3	18.9	8.4	1.1	1.3	131,716	144,094	46.6	51.0	12,378
Total	88.9	5.5	282,771	38.2	15.8	16.3	18.9	8.4	1.1	1.3	131,716	144,094	46.6	51.0	12,378
Source:SCB

==== Skaraborg ====
Location	Turnout	Share	Votes	S	C	M	FP	VPK	KDS	Other	L-vote	R-vote	Left	Right	Margin
Location	%	%		%	%	%	%	%	%	%			%	%	
Falköping	91.6	13.1	21,786	30.7	39.5	15.5	8.3	2.2	3.6	0.2	7,175	13,782	32.9	63.3	6,607
Grästorp	91.5	2.1	3,579	22.2	46.4	18.4	9.9	1.4	1.7	0.0	846	2,673	23.6	74.7	1,827
Gullspång	89.7	2.6	4,380	39.2	36.7	11.1	8.2	2.1	2.6	0.1	1,810	2,453	41.3	56.0	643
Götene	90.8	4.7	7,817	36.4	30.8	13.9	11.1	2.7	5.1	0.1	3,057	4,354	39.1	55.7	1,297
Habo	92.2	2.2	3,723	30.4	33.7	14.6	11.8	1.5	7.9	0.1	1,186	2,240	31.9	60.2	1,054
Hjo	91.2	2.9	4,879	37.9	28.3	16.6	9.3	2.0	5.8	0.1	1,945	2,648	39.9	54.3	703
Karlsborg	93.3	3.4	5,602	45.3	29.8	11.9	8.6	1.8	2.6	0.0	2,641	2,813	47.1	50.2	172
Lidköping	89.7	13.3	22,231	45.3	29.8	11.9	8.6	1.8	2.6	0.0	9,841	11,869	44.3	53.4	2,028
Mariestad	90.4	8.9	14,889	39.9	28.4	14.6	9.9	3.6	3.2	0.5	6,464	7,871	43.4	52.9	1,407
Mullsjö	94.3	1.8	2,931	28.4	36.4	12.5	11.8	1.6	9.3	0.0	878	1,780	30.0	60.7	902
Skara	91.5	6.8	11,280	37.7	31.9	16.0	10.0	2.6	1.7	0.1	4,547	6,535	40.3	57.9	1,988
Skövde	90.6	16.0	26,592	38.0	30.4	14.1	11.1	3.5	2.5	0.4	11,037	14,788	41.5	55.6	3,751
Tibro	91.5	3.9	6,544	39.0	32.3	9.8	11.6	3.2	4.1	0.1	2,759	3,509	42.1	53.6	750
Tidaholm	92.4	5.2	8,616	44.8	31.5	9.9	7.1	3.5	3.0	0.2	4,163	4,173	48.3	48.4	10
Töreboda	89.4	3.9	6,581	34.1	39.4	13.8	8.6	2.2	1.8	0.0	2,391	4,071	36.3	61.9	1,680
Vara	91.5	9.1	15,224	21.3	44.1	22.0	9.3	1.5	1.7	0.0	3,472	11,494	22.8	75.5	8,022
Total	91.0	3.2	166,654	35.6	33.6	14.7	10.0	2.9	3.0	0.2	64,212	97,053	38.5	58.2	32,841
Source:SCB

==== Älvsborg N ====
Location	Turnout	Share	Votes	S	C	M	FP	VPK	KDS	Other	L-vote	R-vote	Left	Right	Margin
Location	%	%		%	%	%	%	%	%	%			%	%	
Ale	92.2	7.8	11,249	46.4	27.2	8.6	10.5	5.1	2.0	0.1	5,802	5,209	51.6	46.3	593
Alingsås	91.0	11.9	17,217	36.1	27.3	13.7	16.3	3.1	2.9	0.5	6,760	9,870	39.3	57.3	3,110
Bengtsfors	90.3	5.7	8,267	44.5	34.3	8.1	8.7	2.0	2.1	0.1	3,847	4,215	46.5	51.1	368
Dals-Ed	89.1	2.3	3,290	25.4	50.6	10.3	8.5	1.3	3.8	0.0	880	2,284	26.7	69.4	1,404
Färgelanda	90.7	3.0	4,381	32.1	47.4	12.8	6.0	1.3	0.5	0.0	1,456	2,898	33.2	66.1	1,442
Herrljunga	93.2	4.2	6,012	25.8	40.3	18.2	12.6	1.4	1.5	0.2	1,635	4,275	27.2	71.1	2,640
Lerum	93.6	10.6	15,295	30.6	25.7	19.4	18.3	3.9	1.5	0.6	5,283	9,689	34.5	63.3	4,406
Lilla Edet	91.0	4.2	6,102	49.5	29.7	8.0	8.0	3.6	1.0	0.1	3,241	2,786	53.1	45.7	455
Mellerud	92.2	5.0	7,174	31.9	45.0	11.9	6.7	1.6	2.8	0.0	2,405	4,565	33.5	63.6	2,160
Trollhättan	90.1	20.6	29,806	51.1	22.0	9.9	10.4	5.0	1.3	0.2	16,716	12,632	56.1	42.4	4,084
Vårgårda	93.1	3.6	5,274	22.5	40.8	15.9	17.4	1.0	2.3	0.1	1,239	3,909	23.5	74.1	2,670
Vänersborg	90.7	15.2	21,935	40.8	29.2	13.3	11.5	3.4	1.6	0.2	9,684	11,859	44.1	54.1	2,175
Åmål	90.0	6.1	8,773	45.5	29.9	11.7	9.0	2.0	1.6	0.2	4,166	4,450	47.5	50.7	284
Total	91.2	2.8	144,775	40.2	30.0	12.5	11.8	3.4	1.8	0.3	63,114	78,641	43.6	54.3	15,527
Source:SCB

==== Älvsborg S ====
Location	Turnout	Share	Votes	S	C	M	FP	VPK	KDS	Other	L-vote	R-vote	Left	Right	Margin
Location	%	%		%	%	%	%	%	%	%			%	%	
Borås	92.5	58.0	65,758	42.0	24.0	19.5	8.3	4.1	1.6	0.4	30,357	34,076	46.2	51.8	3,719
Mark	93.7	17.2	19,463	43.6	30.4	16.8	4.1	3.6	1.3	0.2	9,178	9,996	47.2	51.4	818
Svenljunga	93.1	5.8	6,544	31.2	41.2	19.7	5.7	0.8	1.5	0.0	2,092	4,355	32.0	66.5	2,263
Tranemo	94.8	6.5	7,366	36.2	39.4	14.9	7.4	1.2	0.7	0.1	2,762	4,544	37.5	61.7	1,782
Ulricehamn	93.4	12.6	14,319	27.3	39.1	20.1	10.0	1.1	2.3	0.1	4,060	9,899	28.4	69.1	5,839
Total	93.0	2.2	113,450	39.4	29.0	18.8	7.6	3.3	1.6	0.3	48,449	62,870	42.7	55.4	14,421
Source:SCB

=== Örebro ===
Location	Turnout	Share	Votes	S	C	M	FP	VPK	KDS	Other	L-vote	R-vote	Left	Right	Margin
Location	%	%		%	%	%	%	%	%	%			%	%	
Askersund	90.1	4.2	7,452	47.7	29.9	8.5	7.4	2.4	4.0	0.2	3,728	3,411	50.0	45.8	317
Degerfors	94.7	4.2	7,533	63.1	18.7	5.2	5.3	4.9	2.3	0.4	5,123	2,201	68.0	29.2	2,922
Hallsberg	91.5	6.1	10,751	51.3	26.4	7.1	8.8	3.6	2.5	0.3	5,894	4,548	54.8	42.3	1,346
Hällefors	91.0	4.0	7,062	64.4	15.4	4.9	4.9	8.9	1.2	0.2	5,175	1,783	73.3	25.2	3,392
Karlskoga	91.6	13.8	24,449	55.3	19.4	9.4	7.0	7.0	1.3	0.6	15,236	8,765	62.3	35.9	6,471
Kumla	91.1	6.1	10,783	48.2	24.6	8.0	9.7	5.5	3.6	0.4	5,794	4,566	53.7	42.3	1,228
Laxå	91.5	3.1	5,436	53.3	24.8	6.3	6.5	5.8	3.1	0.1	3,215	2,042	59.1	37.6	1,173
Lindesberg	90.9	8.9	15,758	45.9	31.3	8.6	7.5	3.9	2.4	0.4	7,848	7,477	49.8	47.4	371
Ljusnarsberg	88.5	2.6	4,649	59.3	21.1	4.9	4.7	7.7	2.0	0.2	3,116	1,431	67.0	30.8	1,685
Nora	89.9	3.3	5,833	49.9	24.0	8.8	9.2	5.0	2.8	0.3	3,202	2,451	54.9	42.0	751
Örebro	90.3	43.8	77,604	45.5	24.3	11.9	11.6	3.9	2.2	0.6	38,396	37,024	49.5	47.7	1,372
Total	90.9	3.4	177,310	49.8	23.9	9.6	9.2	4.8	2.3	0.5	96,727	75,699	54.6	42.7	21,028
Source:SCB

=== Östergötland ===
Location	Turnout	Share	Votes	S	C	M	FP	VPK	KDS	Other	L-vote	R-vote	Left	Right	Margin
Location	%	%		%	%	%	%	%	%	%			%	%	
Boxholm	91.7	1.6	4,006	52.9	27.8	7.0	3.6	6.5	2.1	0.0	2,377	1,540	59.3	38.4	837
Finspång	93.7	6.2	15,333	56.9	20.6	9.3	6.1	3.9	2.9	0.3	9,324	5,510	60.8	35.9	3,814
Kinda	91.6	2.8	7,000	33.5	41.2	14.0	5.5	1.6	4.0	0.2	2,463	4,247	35.2	60.7	1,784
Linköping	91.9	28.4	70,371	44.1	23.5	16.0	8.6	4.5	2.9	0.4	34,233	33,824	48.6	48.1	409
Mjölby	90.9	6.5	16,120	47.2	29.5	10.8	5.9	3.5	2.7	0.2	8,177	7,455	50.7	46.2	722
Motala	91.3	12.6	31,121	52.1	22.9	11.2	7.1	4.0	2.4	0.3	17,458	12,795	56.1	41.1	4,663
Norrköping	89.7	30.6	75,630	48.9	20.9	15.9	7.2	4.4	2.1	0.6	40,305	33,300	53.3	44.0	7,005
Söderköping	92.3	2.6	6,457	35.4	38.0	15.3	6.0	2.1	3.0	0.2	2,422	3,829	37.5	59.3	1,407
Valdemarsvik	92.8	2.4	5,982	46.5	30.9	11.0	5.3	3.9	2.2	0.2	3,013	2,824	50.4	47.2	189
Ydre	92.6	1.2	2,851	26.3	43.3	10.7	12.5	1.8	5.4	0.1	801	1,895	28.1	66.5	1,094
Åtvidaberg	92.9	3.5	8,572	55.0	24.6	9.7	5.6	2.0	2.9	0.2	4,884	3,422	57.0	39.9	1,462
Ödeshög	91.6	1.6	3,932	37.6	37.4	12.2	6.6	1.8	4.2	0.1	1,546	2,212	39.3	56.3	666
Total	91.2	4.8	247,375	47.3	24.5	13.9	7.2	4.0	2.6	0.4	127,003	112,853	51.3	45.6	14,150
Source:SCB
