= Svedala =

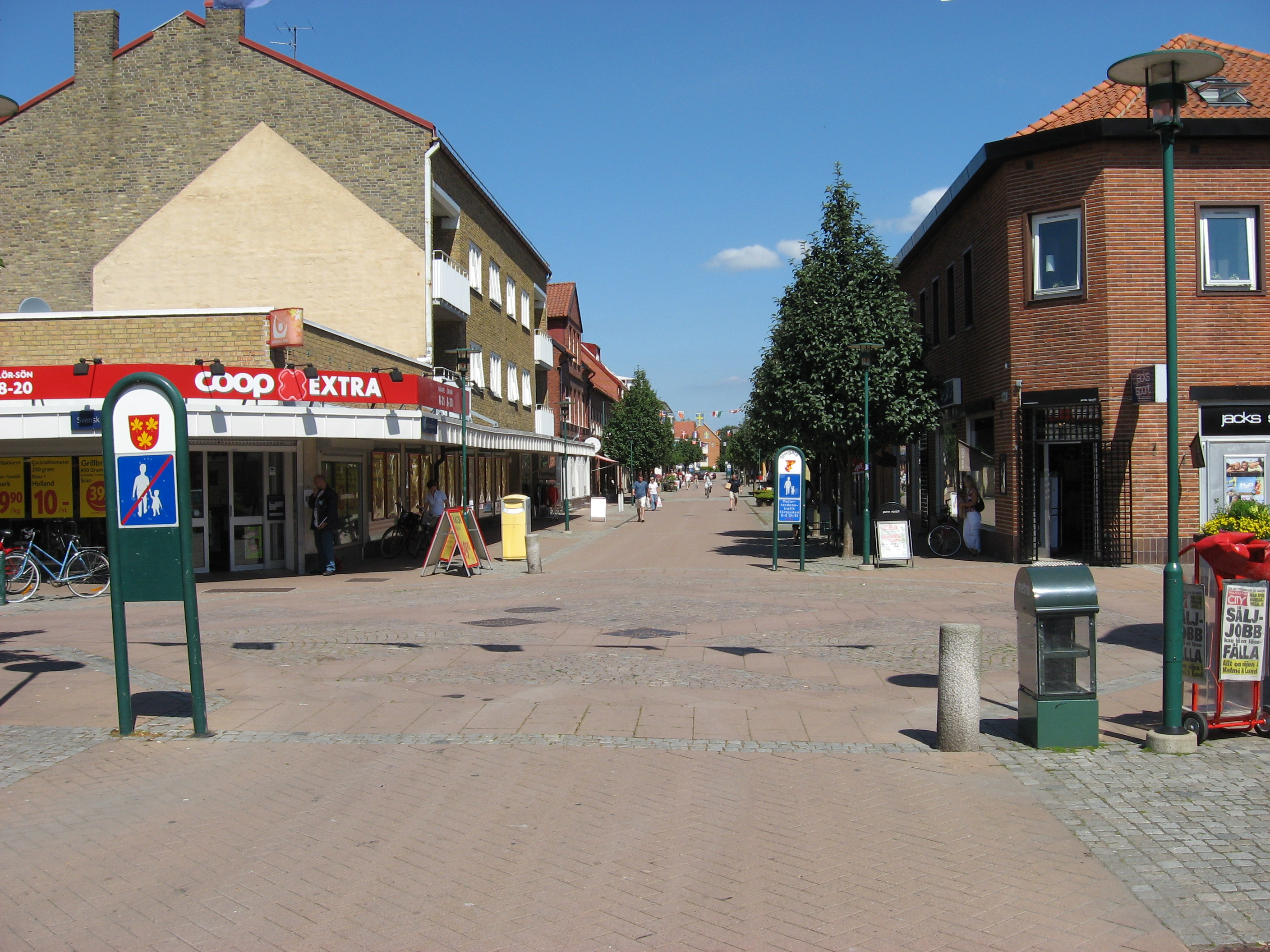
- Main Street in Svedala

- Coat of arms

- Location within Skåne Location within Sweden
- Coordinates: 55°30′N 13°14′E
- Country: Sweden
- Province: Skåne
- County: Skåne County
- Municipality: Svedala Municipality

Area
  - Total: 4.89 km^{2} (1.89 sq mi)

Population (2020)
  - Total: 22,665
  - Density: 104/km^{2} (270/sq mi)
- Time zone: UTC+1 (CET)
  - Summer (DST): UTC+2 (CEST)

Svedala (Swedish: [ˈsvêːˌdɑːla], outdatedly [svɛˈdɑ̌ːla]; is a locality and the seat of Svedala Municipality, Skåne County, Sweden with 22,665 inhabitants in 2020.
