= Sjödiken =

- Location within Skåne Location within Sweden
- Coordinates: 55°31′20″N 13°14′50″E
- Country: Sweden
- Province: Skåne
- County: Skåne County
- Municipality: Svedala Municipality

Area
  - Total: 0.58 km^{2} (0.22 sq mi)

Population (31 December 2010)
  - Total: 438
  - Density: 750/km^{2} (1,900/sq mi)
- Time zone: UTC+1 (CET)
  - Summer (DST): UTC+2 (CEST)

Sjödiken is a locality situated in Svedala Municipality, Skåne County, Sweden with 438 inhabitants in 2010.
