= Holmeja =

- Location within Skåne Location within Sweden
- Coordinates: 55°33′N 13°16′E
- Country: Sweden
- Province: Skåne
- County: Skåne County
- Municipality: Svedala Municipality

Area
  - Total: 0.25 km^{2} (0.097 sq mi)

Population (31 December 2010)
  - Total: 239
  - Density: 975/km^{2} (2,530/sq mi)
- Time zone: UTC+1 (CET)
  - Summer (DST): UTC+2 (CEST)

Holmeja (Swedish pronunciation: [hɔlˈmɛ̌jːa]) is a locality situated in Svedala Municipality, Skåne County, Sweden with 239 inhabitants in 2010. Later, the skull fragments were donated to the school museum in Torup, where they were exhibited in a stand under the inscription "Baras äldste".

== Geography ==
=== Climate ===
Homelja features a Cool Summer Continental Climate (Köppen climate classification: Dfb), with temperatures in summer months rarely exceeding 20 °C (68 °F) and winters being cold and brisk.

Holmeja

Climate chart (precipitation, max. and min. temperature)
J	F	M	A	M	J	J	A	S	O	N	D
229 2 −1	178 2 −1	203 4 1	152 9 3	178 14 8	203 18 12	178 20 14	178 20 15	203 16 12	229 12 8	229 7 4	229 4 1
- █ Average max. and min. temperatures in °C
- █ Precipitation totals in mm
- Source: yr.no
Imperial conversion
J	F	M	A	M	J	J	A	S	O	N	D
9 36 31	7 36 31	8 40 33	6 47 38	7 57 46	8 64 54	7 68 58	7 68 58	8 61 53	9 53 47	9 45 39	9 40 34
- █ Average max. and min. temperatures in °F
- █ Precipitation totals in inches
