= Svedala Municipality =

Svedala Municipality Svedala kommun
- Municipality
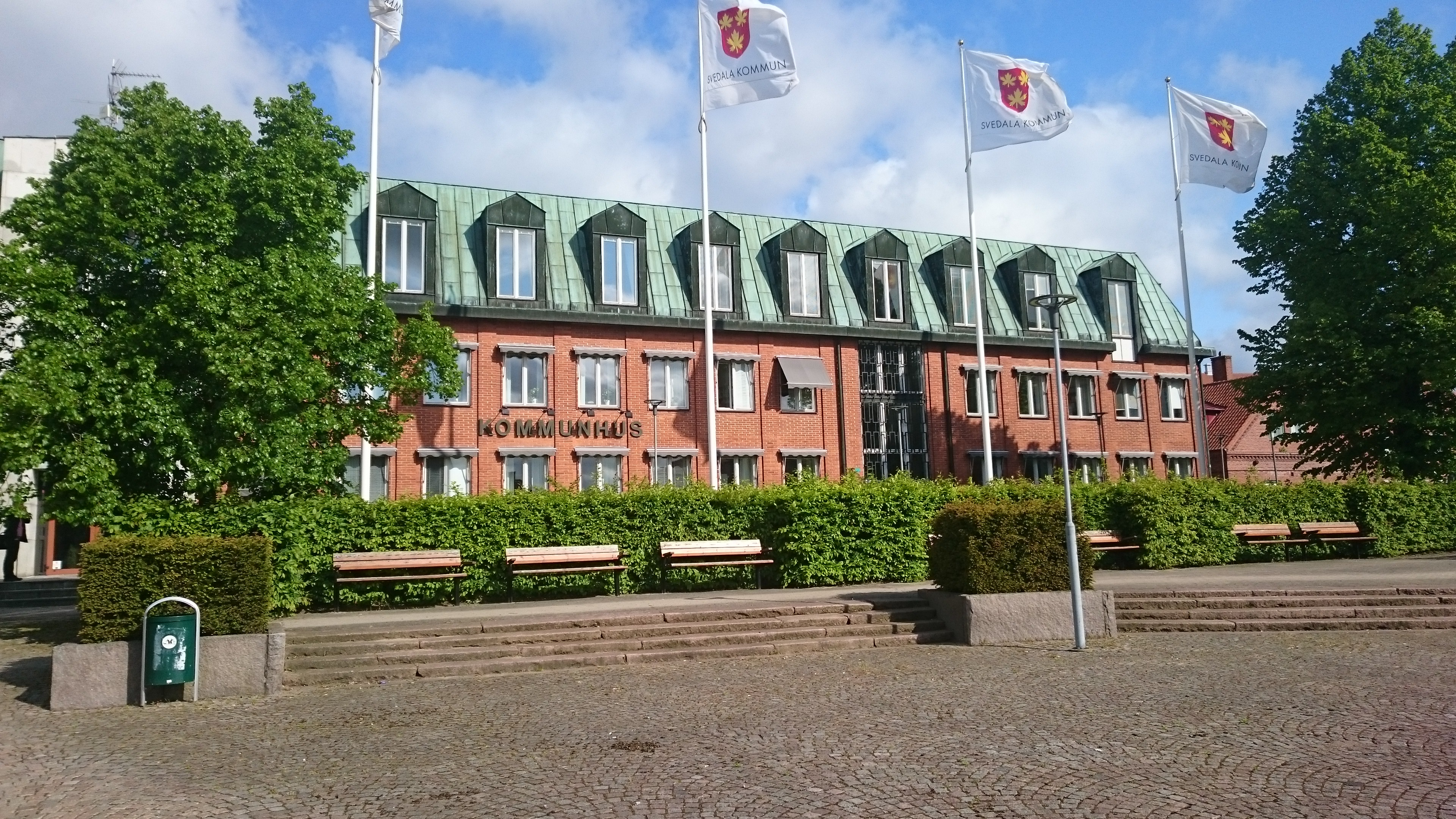
- Municipal Hall

- Flag Coat of arms

- Coordinates: 55°30′N 13°14′E
- Country: Sweden
- County: Skåne County
- Seat: Svedala

Area
  - Total: 227.12 km^{2} (87.69 sq mi)
  - Land: 218.05 km^{2} (84.19 sq mi)
  - Water: 9.07 km^{2} (3.50 sq mi)
- Area as of 1 January 2014.

Population (30 June 2025)
  - Total: 19,822
  - Density: 90.906/km^{2} (235.44/sq mi)
- Time zone: UTC+1 (CET)
  - Summer (DST): UTC+2 (CEST)
- ISO 3166 code: SE
- Province: Scania
- Municipal code: 1263
- Website: www.svedala.se

Svedala Municipality (Swedish: Svedala kommun) is a municipality in Skåne County in southern Sweden, just southeast of Malmö. Its seat is located in the town of Svedala.

The present municipality is the result of a series of amalgamations, carried out in 1952, 1967, 1974 and 1977. Svedala was last municipality to be completed during the local government reform of the 1970s. There had been considerations of adding the whole or parts of the territory to Malmö Municipality.

There exists a city partnership between Svedala Municipality and Bergen auf Rügen, Germany.

== Localities ==
There are 5 urban areas (also called a Tätort or locality) in Svedala Municipality.

In the table the urban areas are listed according to the size of the population as of 2010. The municipal seat is in bold characters.

#	Locality	Population
1	**Svedala**	10 555
2	Bara	3,436
3	Klågerup	1,894
4	Sjödiken	438
5	Holmeja	239

== Demographics ==
This is a demographic table based on Svedala Municipality's electoral districts in the 2022 Swedish general election sourced from SVT's election platform, in turn taken from SCB official statistics.

In total there were 23,210 residents, including 16,609 Swedish citizens of voting age. 35.4% voted for the left coalition and 63.6% for the right coalition. Indicators are in percentage points except population totals and income.

Location	Residents	Citizen adults	Left vote	Right vote	Employed	Swedish parents	Foreign heritage	Income SEK	Degree
Location			%	%					
Bara Bjärshög	1,712	1,093	37.6	60.7	86	74	26	33,167	58
Bara C	1,746	1,189	38.7	60.0	82	75	25	26,755	41
Bara Torup	1,526	1,066	37.6	61.5	85	79	21	30,774	52
Klågerup C	1,453	1,015	33.4	65.4	89	85	15	32,503	47
Klågerup, Hyby	1,710	1,242	35.5	63.6	85	81	19	28,887	47
Svedala C	1,948	1,457	37.0	61.6	84	83	17	26,210	35
Svedala G:a Sockerb.	1,747	1,283	37.5	61.1	80	82	18	24,865	32
Svedala Kyrka	1,717	1,295	34.7	64.3	79	86	14	24,170	27
Svedala N	2,027	1,489	32.6	67.3	86	87	13	30,603	42
Svedala Stadsparken	1,804	1,356	43.2	56.2	84	86	14	27,674	43
Svedala S	2,150	1,454	29.6	70.0	88	86	14	31,243	50
Svedala V	2,014	1,486	35.9	63.4	85	88	12	28,389	47
Svedala Ö	1,656	1,184	30.0	69.0	83	83	17	30,340	40
Source: SVT

== Elections ==
Below are the results listed from since the 1973 municipal reform. Between 1988 and 1998 the Sweden Democrats' results were not published by the SCB due to the party's small size nationwide. "Turnout" denotes the percentage of the electorate casting a ballot, but "Votes" only applies to valid ballots cast.

=== Riksdag ===
Year	Turnout	Votes	V	S	MP	C	L	KD	M	SD	ND
1973	94.0	4,646	1.3	53.9	0.0	27.7	5.5	1.5	10.3	0.0	0.0
1976	95.3	8,641	1.2	47.7	0.0	24.6	10.5	0.9	14.9	0.0	0.0
1979	94.1	9,502	1.7	47.1	0.0	16.2	11.3	0.4	23.1	0.0	0.0
1982	94.7	9,977	1.8	49.9	0.8	14.3	5.7	1.0	26.4	0.0	0.0
1985	92.9	10,509	1.5	46.4	0.9	10.7	14.4	0.0	25.5	0.0	0.0
1988	90.0	10,421	1.8	47.9	4.8	9.7	10.1	1.5	21.7	0.0	0.0
1991	90.0	10,766	1.8	39.9	2.5	6.6	7.2	5.8	26.6	0.0	6.6
1994	90.0	11,355	2.9	51.0	3.1	5.7	5.3	2.8	25.6	0.0	1.8
1998	84.3	10,753	6.4	46.5	3.0	2.7	3.8	9.6	24.7	0.0	0.0
2002	83.6	10,943	3.8	44.5	2.5	3.9	13.4	6.8	16.6	6.3	0.0
2006	85.5	11,650	2.2	36.4	2.7	4.6	8.2	3.9	30.4	9.3	0.0
2010	87.3	12,447	2.2	24.2	4.6	4.0	7.3	3.2	39.5	13.3	0.0
2014	88.9	12,922	2.1	26.6	5.1	4.4	5.4	2.9	26.9	24.1	0.0

Blocs

This lists the relative strength of the socialist and centre-right blocs since 1973, but parties not elected to the Riksdag are inserted as "other", including the Sweden Democrats results from 1988 to 2006, but also the Christian Democrats pre-1991 and the Greens in 1982, 1985 and 1991. The sources are identical to the table above. The coalition or government mandate marked in bold formed the government after the election. New Democracy got elected in 1991 but are still listed as "other" due to the short lifespan of the party. "Elected" is the total number of percentage points from the municipality that went to parties who were elected to the Riksdag.

=== Riksdag ===
Year	Turnout	Votes	Left	Right	SD	Other	Elected
1973	94.0	4,646	**55.2**	43.5	0.0	1.3	98.7
1976	95.3	8,641	48.9	**50.0**	0.0	1.1	98.9
1979	94.1	9,502	48.8	**50.6**	0.0	0.6	99.4
1982	94.7	9,977	**51.7**	46.4	0.0	1.9	98.1
1985	92.9	10,509	**47.9**	50.6	0.0	1.5	98.5
1988	90.0	10,421	**54.5**	41.5	0.0	4.0	96.0
1991	90.0	10,766	41.7	**46.2**	0.0	12.1	94.5
1994	90.0	11,355	**57.0**	39.4	0.0	3.6	96.4
1998	84.3	10,753	**55.9**	40.8	0.0	3.3	96.7
2002	83.6	10,943	**50.8**	40.7	0.0	8.5	91.5
2006	85.5	11,650	41.3	**47.1**	0.0	11.6	88.4
2010	87.3	12,447	31.0	**54.0**	13.3	1.7	98.3
2014	88.9	12,922	**33.8**	39.6	24.4	2.2	97.8
2018	90.9	13,882	28.0	**39.3**	31.5	1.3	98.7

== Culture ==
The event SommarRock (Summer Rock) is held every year in Svedala the second week in July. In 2011 the event attracted 12.200 visitors. Popular bands are The Ark, Mustasch, September and Wilmer X. 2012 marks its 25th anniversary, since its start in 1987.

In Bara, there is a PGA Golf Course that opened 2009. It is ranked as the 17th best PGA Golf Course in Europe.

In Svedala, there is also a local newspaper called Lokaltidningen Svedala.
