= Bara, Scania =

Swedish locality

Bara
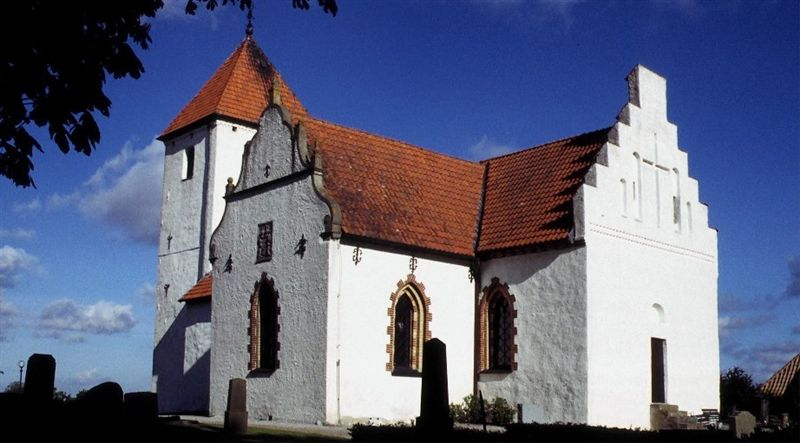
- Bara Church

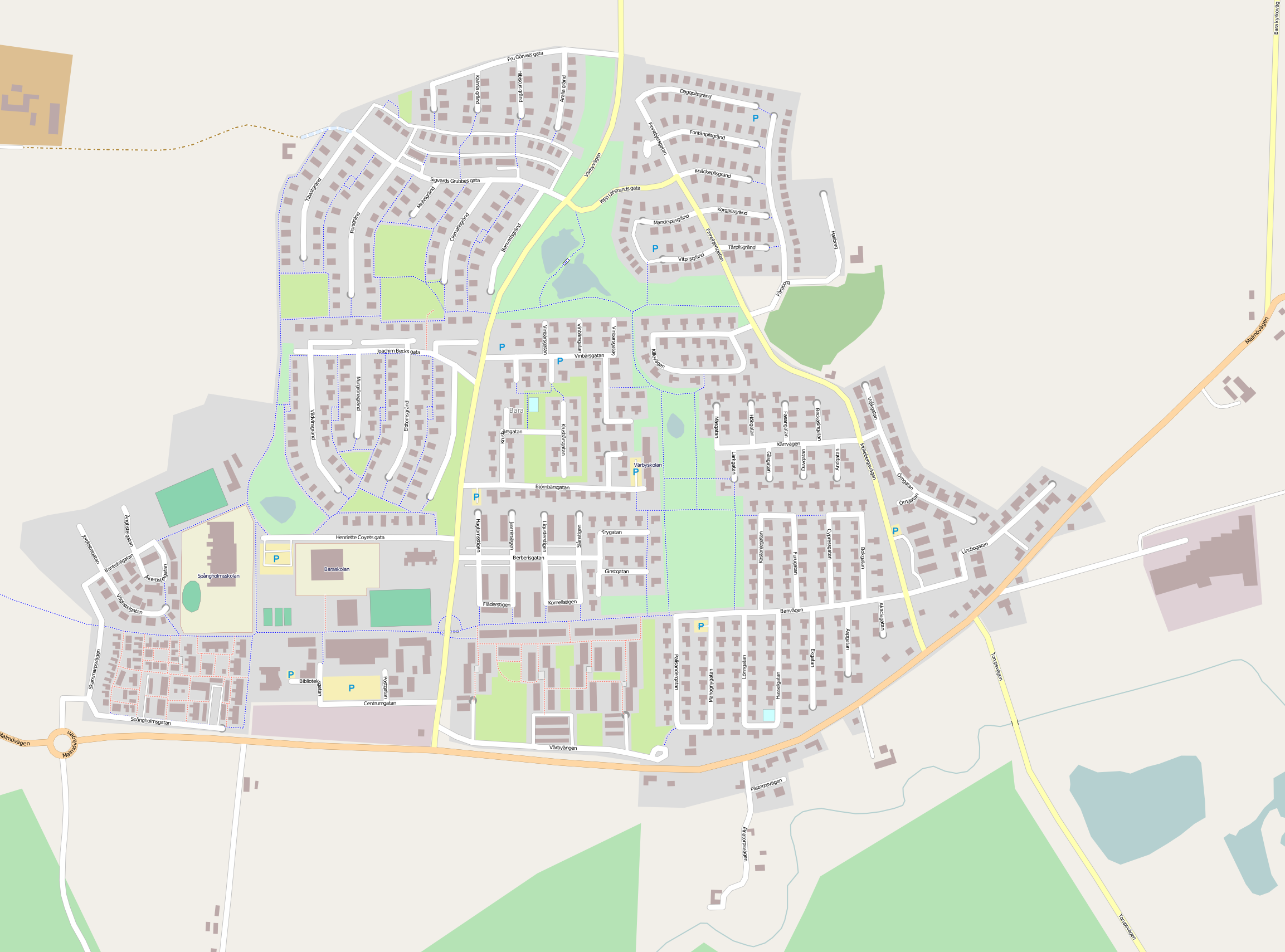
- Map of Bara from OpenStreetMap

- Location within Skåne Location within Sweden
- Coordinates: 55°35′N 13°12′E
- Country: Sweden
- Province: Scania
- County: Skåne County
- Municipality: Svedala Municipality

Area
  - Total: 1.64 km^{2} (0.63 sq mi)

Population (31 December 2010)
  - Total: 3,444
  - Density: 2,101/km^{2} (5,440/sq mi)
- Time zone: UTC+1 (CET)
  - Summer (DST): UTC+2 (CEST)

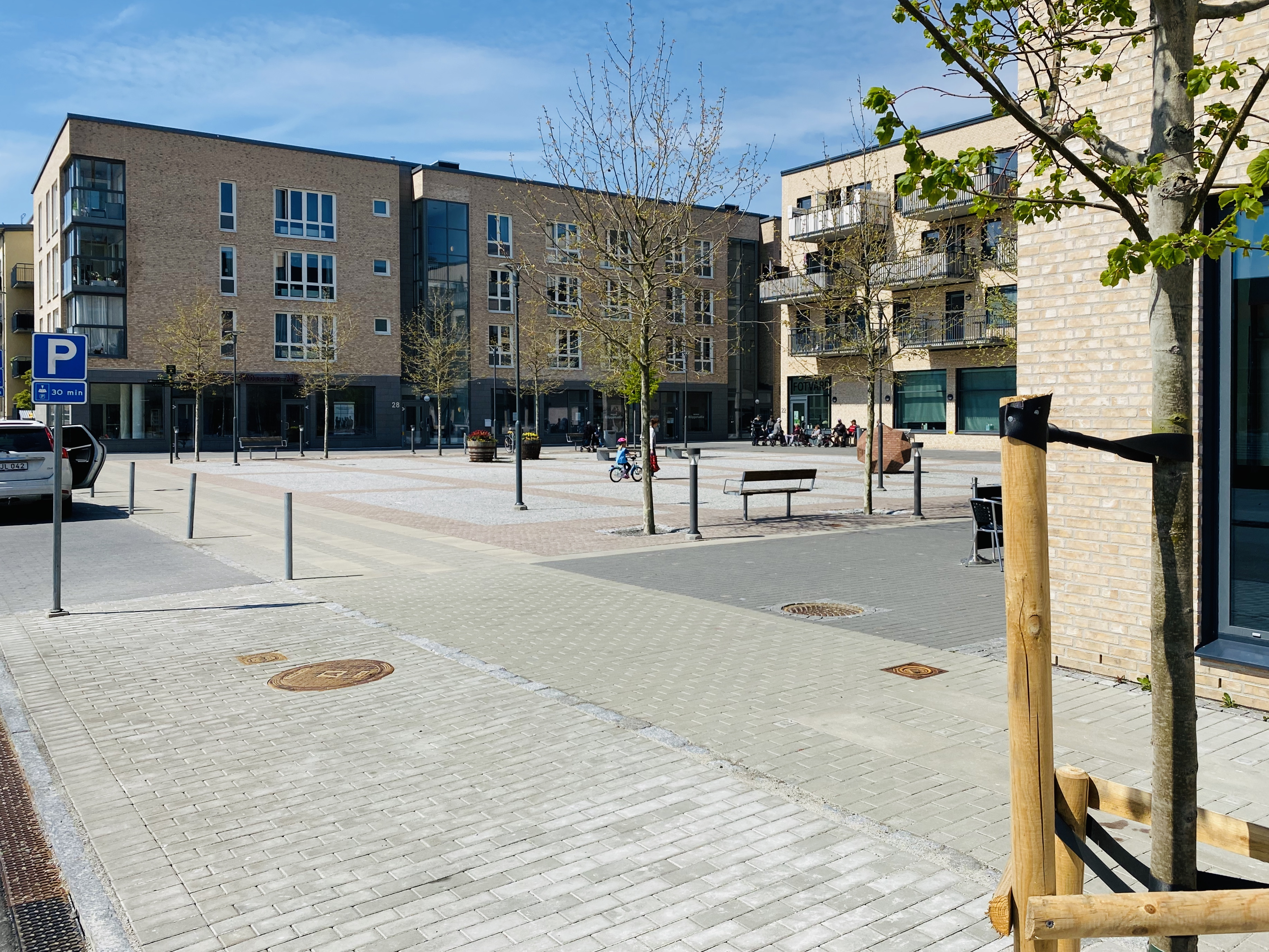
The town centre

Bara is a locality situated in Svedala Municipality, Skåne County, Sweden with 3,444 inhabitants in 2010. Bara is approximately 12 km east of central Malmö.

== History ==
North of Bara (area called Bara Kyrka) lies Bara church and in 1964, the construction of modern Bara started south of the church. Originally Bara was its own municipality but in 1977 it became a part of Svedala Municipality.

== Community facilities ==
In Bara there are grocery stores and fast food, health and cultural services in the form of a dentist, health centre and library, as well as a bank, an ICA store and estate agents.

Bara has two primary schools (Spångholmsskolan and Baraskolan) and four pre-schools. Spångholmskolan is currently undergoing renovation, and so are two of the four pre-schools.

In October 2009, the idea of expanding and renewing central Bara began to take shape under the project name "New Bara." In short, the idea consists of "investments in housing, a completely new cityscape, commercial premises, services, new infrastructure and spectacular leisure attractions. In December 2010, a new multi-sports hall (Kuben) was inaugurated as part of this project, it is mainly used for sports or afterschool activities. Since then, 60 rental apartments have been built in the so-called "New Bara" and a total of over 1000 rental and residential apartments and villas are planned. On 14 February 2011 construction began on a new school in Bara. The name has not yet been determined.

South of Bara lies a PGA golf course. It was introduced by Annika Sörenstam on 12 June 2009.
