= Tore Hedin =

Swedish mass murderer (1927–1952)

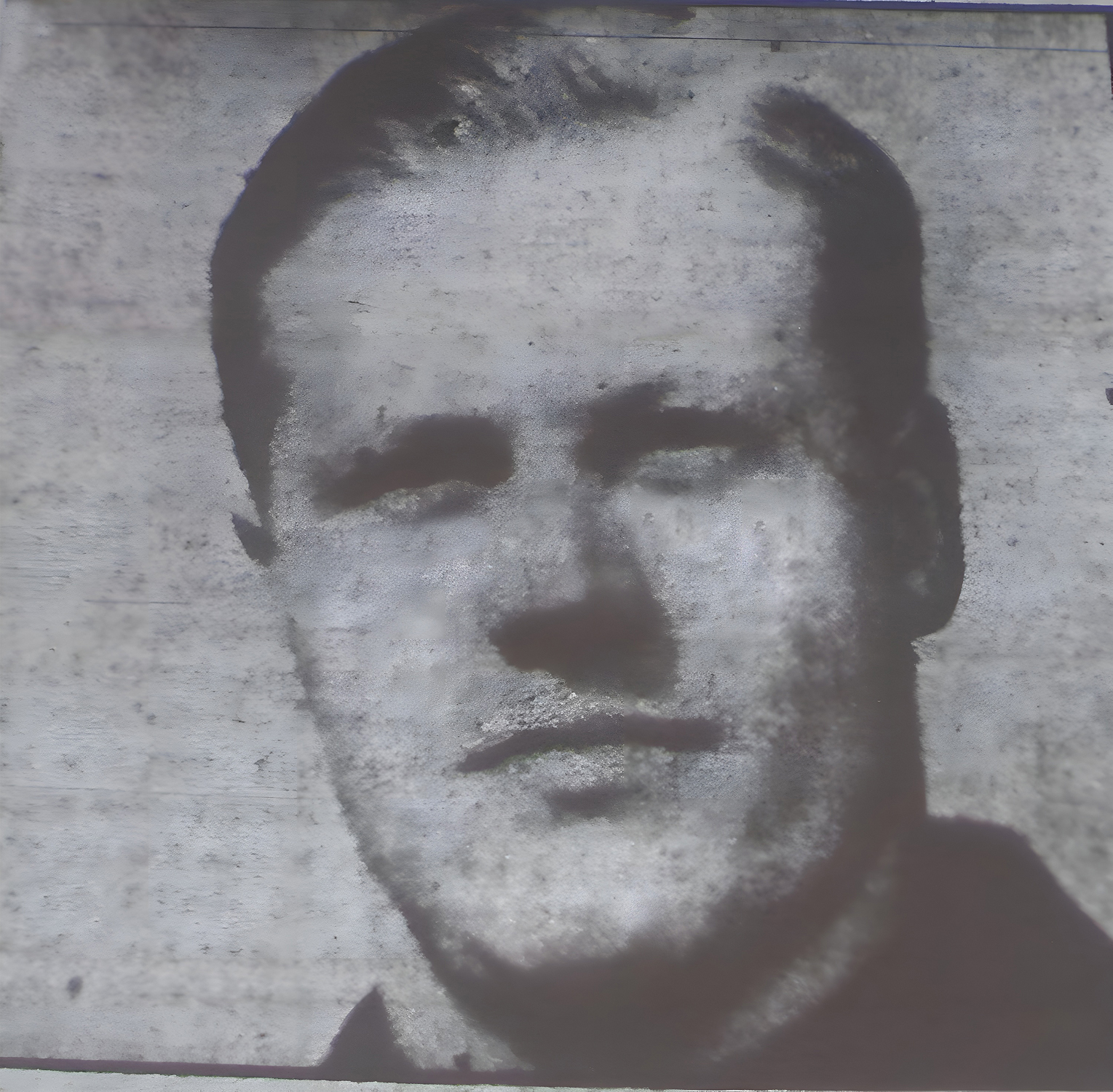
- Born: 7 January 1927; Stora Harrie, Scania, Sweden
- Died: 22 August 1952 (aged 25); Sösdala, Scania, Sweden
- Cause of death: Suicide by drowning
- Occupation: Police officer

Details
- Date: 22 August 1952; 00:00 – c.04:00 am
- Locations: Kvärlöv and Hurva, Scania
- Killed: 10
- Weapons: Axe, gasoline

Tore Hedin (7 January 1927 – 22 August 1952) was a Swedish mass murderer and serial arsonist who killed nine people in a spree killing in Skåne County, Sweden, on the night of 21–22 August 1952. The killings, known as the Hurvamorden ("Hurva murders"), is the deadliest instance of mass murder in Swedish criminal history along with the 2025 Risbergska school shooting. Hedin, who worked as a police officer, had committed a murder in the year prior to the spree killing, taking part in the investigation and being prominently featured in news reports, particularly due to his employ of a medium, itself unique for a Swedish homicide investigation.

== Early life ==
Tore Hedin was born in Stora Harrie, a locality in Kävlinge Municipality, Scania, to Per Alfred Hedin and Hulda Marie Hedin. In 1928, when Hedin was one year old, his parents moved to a farm in Annelöv, which they had purchased for 11,500 kronor. Hedin was described as a diligent, but listless student by his elementary school headmaster Nils Emmertz, who noted that he appeared "weak and languid" and rarely played with other children. His parents were physically abusive, reportedly slapping Hedin whenever he would cry. Hedin was considered a loner and spent most of his free time helping his father during carpentry.

Throughout Hedin's adolescence, the family farm suffered financially due to frequent horse deaths from starvation, exacerbated by supply shortages during World War II. In September 1943, Hedin broke into the local Gustavshills brewery to steal some oats to feed the horses. To avoid detection, he caused a fire in the stables of the brewery to hide his crime, partially destroying the building's stables, causing 36,000 kronor in damages; this was a method he used later to cover his tracks when he committed far more serious crimes. In 1944, Hedin's father sold the farm and moved the family to Kvärlöv, where he had found work as a construction worker.

== Career ==
At age 17, Hedin enlisted in the Wendes Artillery Regiment and underwent training as a non-commissioned officer in Kristianstad. Graduating 28th out of a 30 person class, Hedin remained a corporal throughout his military service. He was noted as friendly and polite, often helping out as a dishwasher for female mess hall workers, but was considered unfit for promotion. In the autumn of 1946, he received ten-days of disciplinary arrest for numerous counts of theft, including driving a car without authorisation, and per his own later confession, he stole a motorcycle in Kristianstad for a joyride, later burning the bike in Åsum; the record was expunged after Hedin became a police officer.

After leaving the Swedish Army in 1948, Hedin applied twice to enroll in the police academy, but was rejected both times. He instead found work as a tour bus driver in Landskrona, reportedly because he "wanted to wear a uniform". In 1950, Hedin left his job and briefly worked as a nurse assistant at St. Lars Mental Hospital in Lund. In 1951, Hedin volunteered for five police stations in neighbouring Malmöhus County before securing a temporary position as the assigned police officer (Fjärdingsman) of the village of Tjörnarp, which had a staff shortage and received only one other applicant besides Hedin. Due to the small size of Tjörnarp, Hedin's duties were limited to tax collection. Hedin became popular amongst townsfolk for his professional attitude and lenience regarding tax payments.

== Murder of Allan Nilsson ==
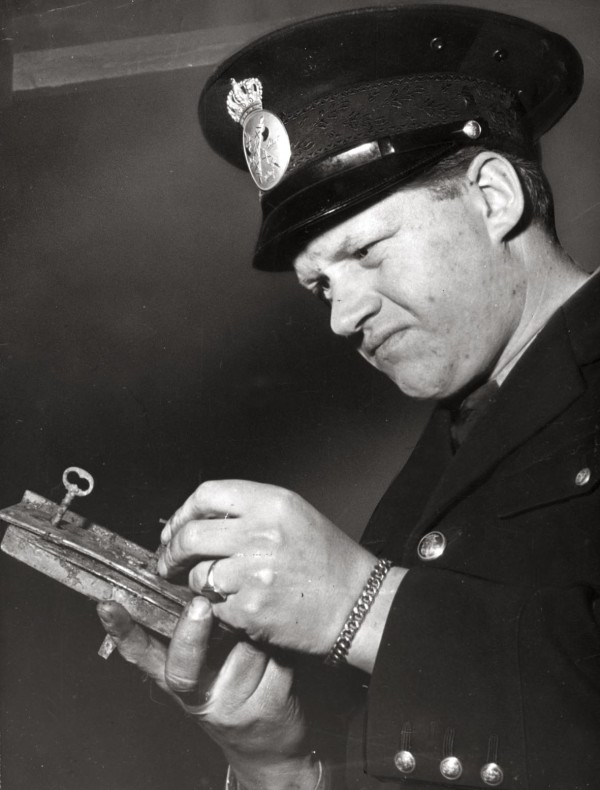
Tore Hedin, photographed by Stieg Eldh, examining a rim lock at the crime scene of Allan Nilsson's murder

On the evening of 28 November 1951, Hedin met with John Folke Allan Nilsson, the owner of Tjörnarp's mill and locality representative of the Höör-based farmer's association, for a poker game at Nilsson's home. Hedin had heard that Nillson, the wealthiest man in the village, was planning to bring 5,000 kronor to a bank within the week and made preparations to rob Nilsson. Hedin carried along an axe, hidden inside a suitcase, as well as a bottle of petroleum on his bicycle and during the night, Hedin bludgeoned Nilsson to death with the axe. After stealing Nilsson's wallet, containing 4,369 kronor, and Nilsson's Swiss wristwatch, Hedin placed Nilsson's body on his bed and emptied the fuel he had brought inside the room. Because there wasn't enough fuel for a fire, Hedin took gasoline from the house's garage, which he poured into Nilsson's mouth and several other rooms. He set the fire at 2:40 a.m., which was noticed at around 3:00 a.m., with Tjörnarp's volunteer fire department arriving 30 minutes later. The fire crew's chief, Bernt Nilsson, entered the burning building in hopes of saving the occupant, but had to jump from a window when the heat became too intense. In the morning, Allan Nilsson's body was brought in for autopsy, confirming he had died by blunt force trauma to the back of the head rather than smoke inhalation.

The case attracted considerable attention due to the nature of the crime inside an otherwise peaceful rural area. Interest only increased due to the testimony of a witness, Erhold Håkansson, who had passed by the house shortly after the fire was set and spotted a man in uniform, wearing a distinct cap with a golden badge, standing outside, watching the blaze. As the local police representative, Hedin took part in the investigation and even answered questions from the national media concerning the case. He was amongst several government workers questioned as part of Håkansson's description, but excluded from the list after simply claiming to have slept through the night of the murder. The remaining suspects were largely postal and railway workers.

In the following weeks, Hedin, who was previously described as listless in his performance, became significantly livelier and open, often eating out at the guesthouse where he would answer questions about the murder investigation and share his own theories. Due to a lack of leads, Hedin arranged for a séance by Olle Jönsson from Varberg, who had boasted about his ability to "reveal the murderer at any time, even if he is on the other side of the world". A reward of 10,000 kronor was issued by Kristianstad administrative authorities. Journalist Karl Anders Adrup, then a reporter for Dagen Nyheter, and photographer Stieg Eldh, grew suspicious of Hedin early on after meeting him, as he was the only local person with a uniform matching the witness description and did not have verifiable alibi. Adrup and Eldh reported him to police, but they dismissed the idea that a policeman could be the murderer.

Using the money he stole from Nilsson, Hedin purchased a Renault 4CV and a cottage near Bosarpasjön lake. He kept Nilsson's watch, which had the victim's initials "A.N." engraved, hidden inside the attic of his parents' house.

== Hurvamorden ==
=== Events leading up to the killings ===
On 1 March 1952, Hedin became engaged to Ulla Östberg, who had ended her previous relationship with a local farmer after becoming enamored with Hedin for his outwardly caring nature. In the summer of the same year, the couple went on a road trip across Sweden in Hedin's car. During the trip, Hedin displayed an irritable and aggressive demeanor, reacting violently when Östberg rejected his advances. The couple cut their vacation short after Östberg confronted Hedin about his morals as a police officer after she found towels which he had stolen from his former workplace at the St. Lars Mental Hospital. In July, Östberg broke off their engagement by sending back the ring he had bought her. Hedin unsuccessfully attempted to convince her to reconsider, after which Östberg moved to Hurva, where she lived at a nursing home she worked for.

On 1 August, Hedin was reassigned to Uppåkra for three weeks. During this time, colleagues noted that Hedin completed no paperwork, mostly sitting at his desk staring blankly ahead. On 19 August, Hedin went to Östberg's residence, where he demanded she either moved back in with him or give back the presents he had given her during their relationship. When Östberg refused to do either, Hedin assaulted her, pushing his hand into her mouth, cutting open her soft palate with a large klackring he wore. After restraining her with handcuffs and gagging her with a handkerchief, Hedin held Östberg hostage throughout the night, threatening to shoot her if she tried to flee. Hedin let her go the following morning on 20 August, threatening to "silence her completely" if she told anyone about the incident.

Östberg reported the assault and hostage situation to her boss, Agnes Lundin, who alerted a doctor and Snogeröd officer Nils Ottosson. Östberg's testimony was supported by an unanswered call made to Eslöv prosecutor Sten Ugander, by the husband of a nurse who had called Östberg's room during the night and become suspicious because she had seen Hedin enter, but not leave the building. Despite Östberg declining to file a criminal charge and defending Hedin as a "modest man", Malmö Landsfogde Alf Eliason terminated Hedin's position the same day. At 10:30 p.m., Hedin was called into the prosecutor's office in Bara, where his superior A. Gustafsson informed Hedin of his suspension. Hedin admitted to "behaving stupidly" and handed in his service pistol and handcuffs before being allowed to drive home without further notice. On 21 August, Hedin called Österberg's workplace, which falsely claimed that Österberg was hospitalised in Lund to dissuade him from coming over. Officers Nils Ottosson and Gunnar Johansson arrived at the nursing home to stand guard, but were ordered to return to the police station shortly after.

=== Killings ===
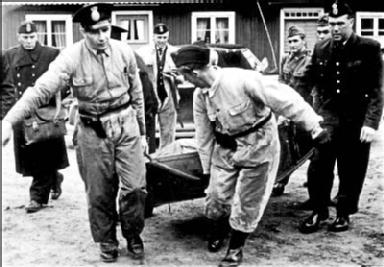
Tore Hedin's body being dragged up from the lake.

On the night of 21 August 1952, shortly after midnight, Hedin travelled by car to his parents' house in Saxtorp, where he killed both by bludgeoning them with an axe as they slept before setting the house on fire.

Thirty minutes later, Hedin arrived at the retirement home in Hurva, where Östberg lived and worked. He climbed a fire escape and entered the room where Östberg usually slept. This night, however, she was not sleeping there, but in the room of the matron, Agnes Lundin. Realising this, Hedin entered Lundin's room and killed them both with an axe. Afterwards, he blocked the entrance to the retirement home and set it on fire. Four elderly people died in the flames, with a fifth dying some days later from severe burns.

After starting a manhunt, police found his car parked near his summer cabin by Bosarpasjön, Skåne County. In the front seat was a suicide note, his jacket and his wallet. The suicide note contained a full confession of all crimes he committed. He affirmed that he killed Allan Nilsson for his money, Ulla Östberg for her "deceit", Agnes Ludin for attempting to protect Östberg and his parents to avoid having them suffer for his crimes. He wrote that the biggest regret in his "sad life" was not becoming a detective, writing that he wanted to "uncover unsolved crime", and that he hoped for "understanding and forgiveness" after his death.

Hedin's weighted-down body was later found in Bosarpasjön. His corpse was transported to the Institution of Anatomy at Lund University. It was stored at the institution until 1974, when it was cremated.

Hedin's suicide note was widely republished by newspapers. Despite the admission that Hedin sought revenge for his rejection by his former fiancée, there was speculation by the press if Hedin was affected by mental illness. Following the reveal of Hedin's guilt in the murder of Allan Nilsson, medium Olle Jönsson, who had moved to the United States by this point, was widely mocked in Swedish media. Jönsson himself would claim later in life that he had positively identified Hedin as the killer and that Hedin committed the spree killing because he knew he was about to be exposed by Jönsson.

== Victims ==
- Hulda Hedin, 57, Hedin's mother
- Per Hedin, 74, Hedin's father
- Agnes Lundin, 54
- Ulla Östberg, 23
- Bengta Andersson, 85
- Elna Andersson, 82
- Nils Larsson, 84
- Maria Nilsdotter, 69
- Marie Petersson, 80
- John Allan Nilsson, 32
