= Asmundtorp Church =

- Asmundtorps kyrka
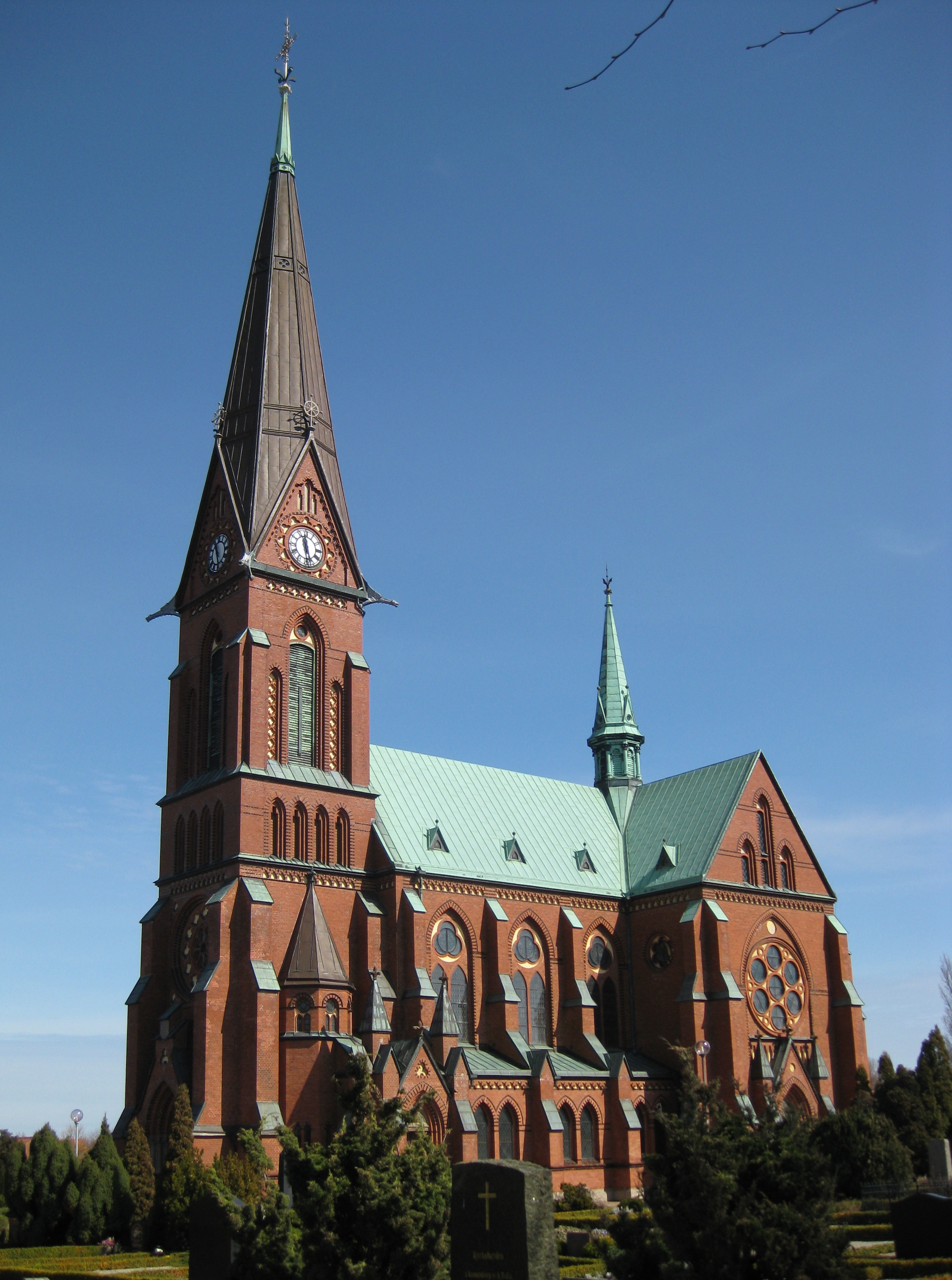
- Asmundtorp Church

- 55°53′12″N 12°56′49″E
- Country: Sweden
- Denomination: Church of Sweden

Asmundtorp Church (Swedish: Asmundtorps kyrka) is a church in Asmundtorp, Landskrona Municipality, Skåne, Sweden. The current neo-Gothic church was built in 1895–1897 and replaced a medieval church on the same site. Designed by architect Gustaf Hermansson, it is one of the most accomplished examples of 19th-century church architecture in Skåne. It contains a medieval bronze baptismal font of northern German origin, the only one of its kind in the province. The church belongs to the Church of Sweden and is in the Diocese of Lund.

== History ==
A stone church was first built on the site of the present-day church as early as the 12th century. The medieval church was richly decorated with frescos. In the early 19th century, it was considered too small for the congregation, and it was substantially enlarged and altered between 1843 and 1846, partially to designs by Carl Georg Brunius. In 1869, however, a proposal was put forward to build an entirely new church to house the ever-growing congregation. In 1888 the parish announced an architectural competition for the design of a new church, specifying that the designs should be in the Neo-Gothic style. Although the winner of the competition was architect Axel Anderberg, the church council decided to go ahead with the designs submitted by Hermansson instead, probably because his proposal was deemed to be cheaper to build. The old church was demolished in 1895 and the present building erected in 1895–1897.

The new church was financed with returns from eleven farmsteads that were donated to the church during the Middle Ages.

A major renovation was done in 1987.

Asmundtorp Church belongs to the Church of Sweden and the Diocese of Lund.

== Architecture and church furniture ==
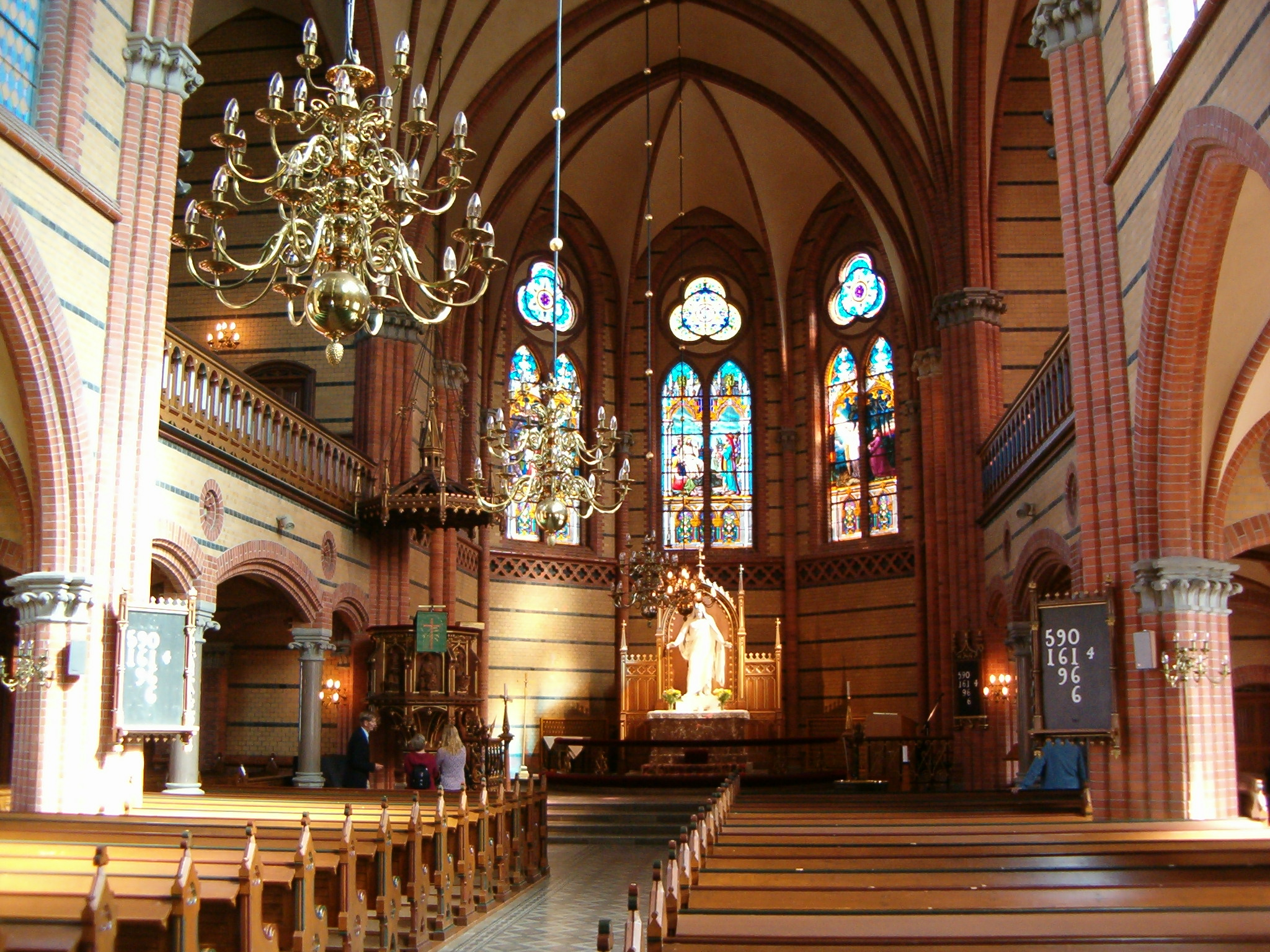
Interior, view towards the choir

The church was designed by architect Gustaf Hermansson in a Neo-Gothic style, with details made by architect Herman Sjöström, who also supervised the construction. It is unusually tall, the tower reaching 66 metres (217 ft), and has been described as one of the most accomplished examples of 19th-century church architecture in Skåne. The building material of the church is red brick, supplied locally by Asmundtorp tegelbruk (Asmundtorp brickyard). It consists of a western tower, a nave with two aisles, transept and a pentagonal choir. The sacristy is located at the eastern end of the choir, between two buttresses. The church bells are older than the church, made in 1610 and 1651 and both made in Copenhagen.

Inside, the church ceiling consists of brick vaults. Of the furnishings, perhaps the most unusual is the bronze baptismal font that belonged to the original, medieval church. The baptismal font dates from the 15th century and was made in northern Germany; it is the only medieval bronze font known from Skåne. The altarpiece is a copy of Thorvaldsen's Christus, and also comes from the old church, where it was installed in 1859. The wooden pulpit dates from the construction period of the church and is decorated with motifs symbolising the Old Testament on one side, and the New Testament on the other. The stained glass windows in the choir, made by artist Reinhold Callmander in Gothenburg, show scenes from the life of Christ in the central panels, while the outer panels display the Four Evangelists and their symbols. The present pipe organ dates from 1974 but its facade is contemporary with the church building.
