= Tofta =

Tofta may refer to:

- Tofta, Adelsö, a seat farm and manorial lordship in Uppland, Sweden
- Tofta, Gotland, a locality on the island of Gotland, Sweden
  - Tofta firing range, a military training ground in Tofta on the Swedish island of Gotland
- Tofta, Varberg Municipality, a locality in Halland County, Sweden
- Tofta Leikvøllur, a multi-purpose stadium in Toftir, Faroe Islands
- Tofta, Landskrona Municipality, a district in Skåne County, Sweden
