= Syster Maria av Bebådelsen =

Swedish Carmelite nun and documentary subject

Personal life
- Born: Marta Cavallin; 1977 (age 48–49)
- Known for: Subject of the documentaries Nunnan (2007) and Nunnan – 25 år i kloster (2025)

Religious life
- Religion: Roman Catholic
- Order: Carmelites

Syster Maria av Bebådelsen (English: Sister Maria of the Annunciation; born Marta Cavallin 1977) is a Swedish Carmelite nun (O.Carm.). She became widely known through the documentary film Nunnan (The Nun, 2007) by Maud Nycander, and its 2025 follow-up Nunnan – 25 år i kloster (The Nun – 25 Years in a Monastery).

== Early life and vocation ==
At the age of 19, Marta Cavallin entered the Carmelite convent in Glumslöv, in southern Sweden, in the year 2000, beginning her five-year period of formation (postulancy and novitiate) before making her solemn profession.

== Monastic life ==
The Carmelite order in Glumslöv is strictly enclosed. The nuns do not leave the convent grounds, even for burial, as there is a cemetery is within the cloister. Contact with family members is limited to a visitation room separated by bars. When asked about her lifelong commitment, she commented: "No, I am very happy. It is such an enormous gift to be able to live here for the rest of my life."

== Documentaries ==
In 2007, director Maud Nycander released Nunnan (The Nun), a documentary following Cavallin’s novitiate and first years in the cloister. The film includes interviews with her family members, who reflected on her decision to enter monastic life.

In 2025, Nycander revisited her life in the follow-up documentary Nunnan – 25 år i kloster (The Nun – 25 Years in a Monastery), marking 25 years since her entry into the convent.
