= Saxtorpsskogen =

- Location within Skåne Location within Sweden
- Coordinates: 55°50′N 12°57′E
- Country: Sweden
- Province: Skåne
- County: Skåne County
- Municipality: Landskrona Municipality and Kävlinge Municipality

Area
  - Total: 1.46 km^{2} (0.56 sq mi)

Population (31 December 2010)
  - Total: 973
  - Density: 667/km^{2} (1,730/sq mi)
- Time zone: UTC+1 (CET)
  - Summer (DST): UTC+2 (CEST)

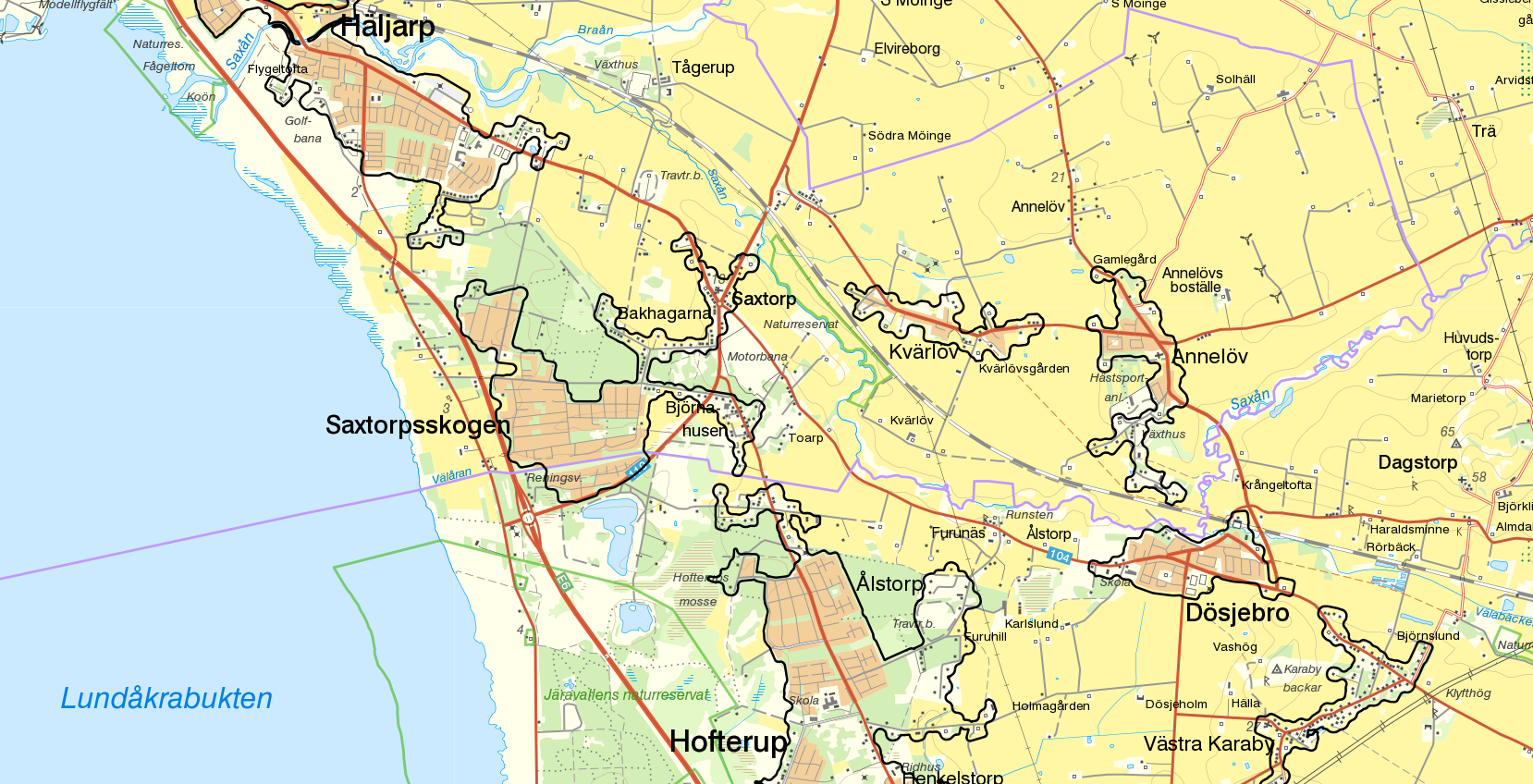

Saxtorpsskogen is a bimunicipal locality situated in Landskrona Municipality and Kävlinge Municipality in Skåne County, Sweden with 1245 inhabitants in 2020.
