= Asmundtorps IF =

Swedish football club

- Full name: Asmundtorps Idrottsförening
- Founded: 1915
- Ground: Asmundtorps IP; Asmundtorp; Sweden
- Chairman: Rune Olsson
- League: Division 4 Skåne Nordvästra
Home colours	Away colours

Asmundtorps IF is a Swedish football club located in Asmundtorp.

== Background ==
Asmundtorps IF currently plays in Division 5 Skåne Nordvästra which is the seventh tier of Swedish football. They play their home matches at the Asmundtorps IP in Asmundtorp.

The club is affiliated to Skånes Fotbollförbund.

Asmundtorps IF announced in autumn 2019 via their Instagram page, the signing of English right back Craig Simkiss with a "strong pass foot".

== Season to season ==
Season	Level	Division	Section	Position	Movements
1999	Tier 5	Division 4	Skåne Västra	3rd	
2000	Tier 5	Division 4	Skåne Västra	1st	Promoted
2001	Tier 4	Division 3	Södra Götaland	3rd	
2002	Tier 4	Division 3	Södra Götaland	2nd	Promotion Playoffs
2003	Tier 4	Division 3	Södra Götaland	5th	
2004	Tier 4	Division 3	Södra Götaland	6th	
2005	Tier 4	Division 3	Södra Götaland	2nd	
2006*	Tier 4	Division 2	Södra Götaland	11th	Relegated
2007	Tier 5	Division 3	Södra Götaland	1st	Promoted
2008	Tier 4	Division 2	Södra Götaland	9th	
2009	Tier 4	Division 2	Västra Götaland	12th	Relegated
2010	Tier 5	Division 3	Sydvästra Götaland	12th	Relegated
2011	Tier 6	Division 4	Skåne Nordvästra	9th	Relegation Playoffs
2025	Tier 7	Division 5	Skåne Nordvästra	7th	

* League restructuring in 2006 resulted in a new division being created at Tier 3 and subsequent divisions dropping a level.
