= Landskrona Municipality =

Landskrona Municipality Landskrona kommun
- Municipality
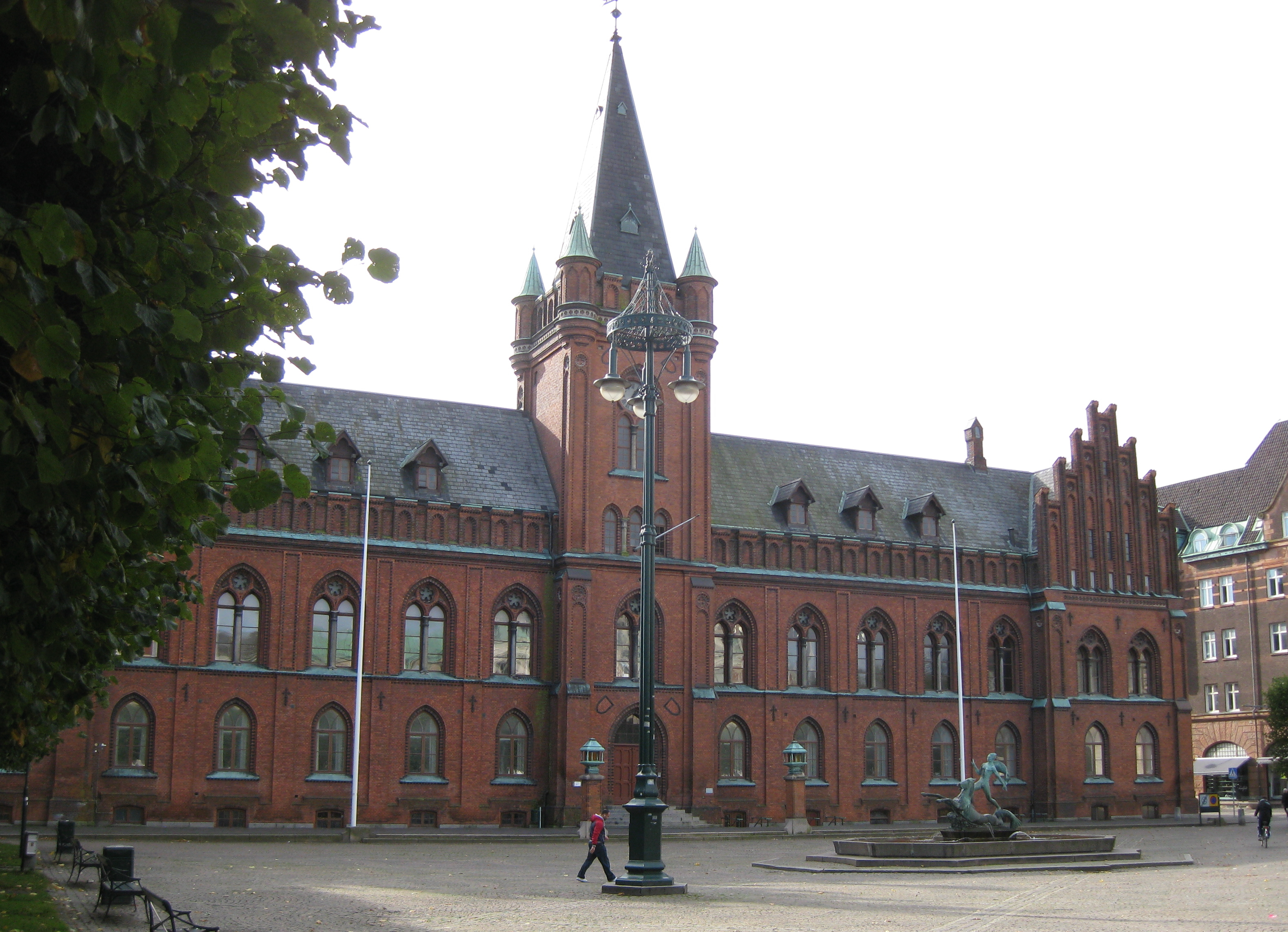
- Landskrona Town Hall

- Coat of arms

- Coordinates: 55°52′N 12°50′E
- Country: Sweden
- County: Scania County
- Seat: Landskrona

Area
  - Total: 300.64 km^{2} (116.08 sq mi)
  - Land: 140.28 km^{2} (54.16 sq mi)
  - Water: 160.36 km^{2} (61.92 sq mi)
- Area as of 1 January 2014.

Population (30 June 2025)
  - Total: 47,467
  - Density: 338.37/km^{2} (876.38/sq mi)
- Time zone: UTC+1 (CET)
  - Summer (DST): UTC+2 (CEST)
- ISO 3166 code: SE
- Province: Scania
- Municipal code: 1282
- Website: www.landskrona.se

Landskrona Municipality (Swedish: Landskrona kommun) is a municipality in Scania County in Sweden. Its seat is located in the city of Landskrona.

The island of Ven was added to the City of Landskrona in 1959. The amalgamations leading to the present municipality took place in 1967, 1969 and 1974. Since 1971 it is a municipality of unitary type, like all other municipalities of Sweden. The municipality, however, prefers to style itself Landskrona stad (City of Landskrona). This is purely nominal and has no effect on the status of the municipality.

== Localities ==
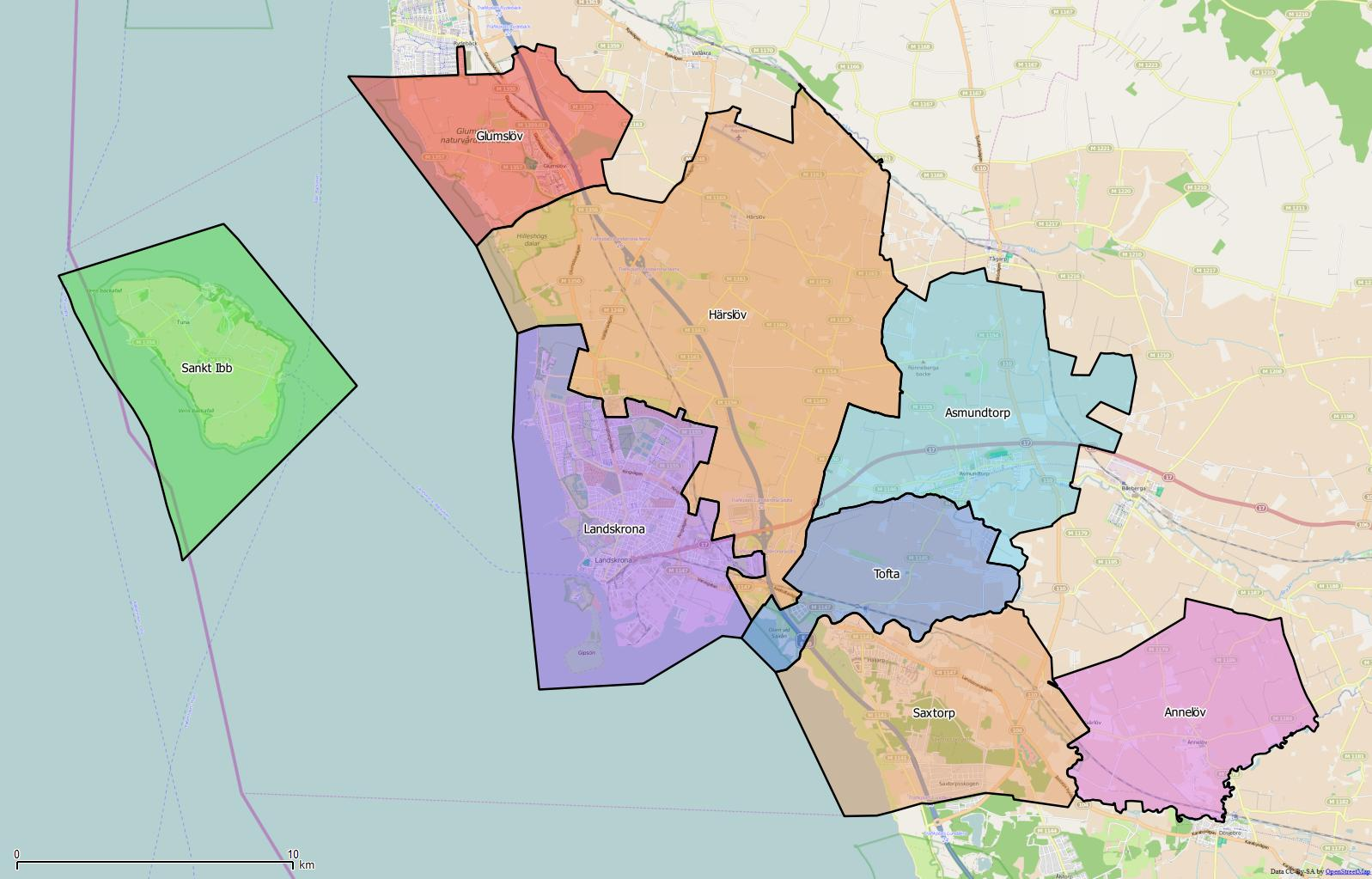
Administrative divisions in Landskrona Municipality

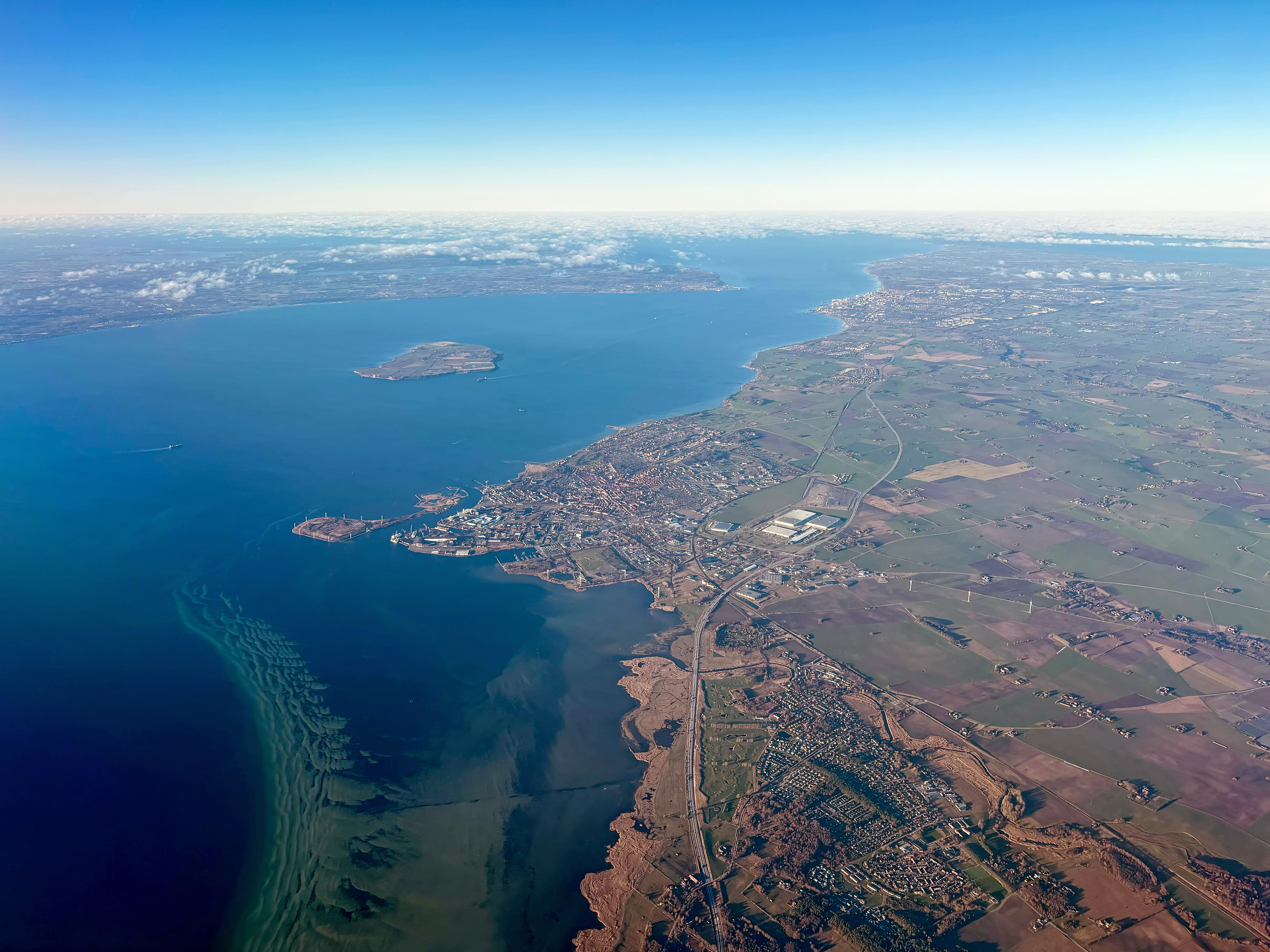
Aerial view of Landskrona

There are 8 urban areas (Swedish: Tätort, or locality) in Landskrona Municipality. In the table they are listed according to the size of the population as of December 31, 2005. The municipal seat is in bold characters.

#	Locality	Population
1	**Landskrona**	28,670
2	Häljarp	2,561
3	Glumslöv	1,861
4	Asmundtorp	1,551
5	Saxtorpsskogen	729
6	Härslöv	401
7	Annelöv	341
8	Kvärlöv	206

=== Districts ===
Landskrona Municipality has since 2016 an administrative division of 8 districts. They are Annelöv, Asmundtorp, Glumslöv, Härslöv, Landskrona, Sankt Ibb (Ven), Saxtorp and Tofta. (Note: An amendment was passed by the Swedish government effectively dividing the country into a set number of districts.)

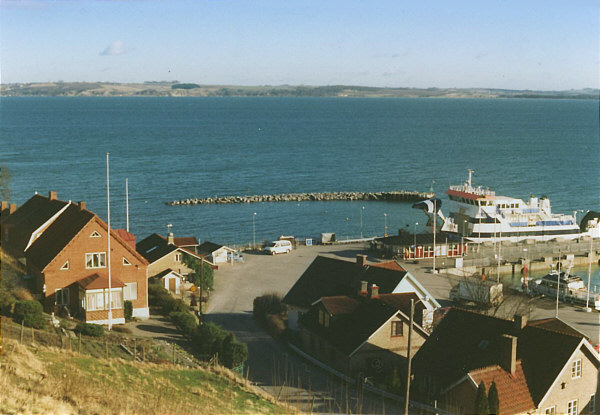
Ven, with the main land as skyline

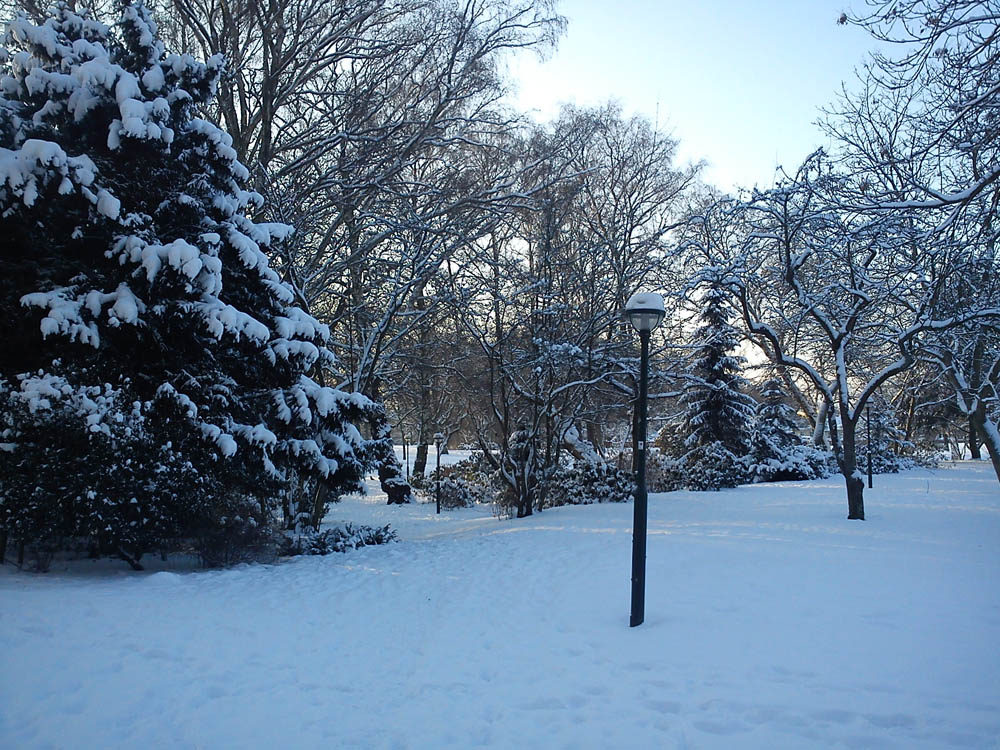
Winter in Landskrona

== Demographics ==
This is a demographic table based on Landskrona Municipality's electoral districts in the 2022 Swedish general election sourced from SVT's election platform, in turn taken from SCB official statistics.

In total there were 46,372 residents, including 34,011 Swedish citizens of voting age resident in the municipality. 42.7% voted for the left coalition and 54.4% for the right coalition. Indicators are in percentage points except population totals and income.

Location	Residents	Citizen adults	Left vote	Right vote	Employed	Swedish parents	Foreign heritage	Income SEK	Degree
Location			%	%					
Albano	2,050	1,554	50.3	45.7	69	54	46	19,474	28
Annelöv	1,722	1,268	31.5	67.7	85	89	11	29,284	40
Asmundstorp	2,234	1,663	31.0	67.5	86	81	19	27,852	34
Centrum	1,858	1,334	46.2	49.4	65	53	47	19,622	32
Cittadellstaden	1,750	1,435	37.2	61.1	77	74	26	24,737	34
Dammhagen	2,293	1,306	52.0	40.0	55	31	69	14,678	23
Drottningen	1,908	1,596	43.5	56.2	86	81	19	27,091	43
Fröjdenborg	1,855	1,487	46.3	50.9	70	63	37	21,232	36
Glumslöv N	1,583	1,178	39.2	60.0	84	85	15	34,084	58
Glumslöv S	1,390	1,004	38.5	61.1	83	83	17	30,790	60
Gustav Adolf	2,390	1,543	51.6	42.5	63	36	64	18,519	24
Helgebröten	1,411	1,117	55.4	42.1	81	48	52	23,859	37
Häljarp N	2,205	1,711	29.6	69.9	85	78	22	29,700	44
Häljarp S	2,178	1,562	33.1	66.2	88	85	15	29,755	44
Härslöv	1,240	912	37.4	61.3	84	78	22	28,019	39
Karlslund	2,223	1,357	53.1	39.7	68	42	58	20,430	30
Larvi	1,749	1,429	46.3	51.8	73	68	32	21,838	30
Norra Borstahusen	738	728	29.4	70.2	88	86	14	32,269	60
Norra Förstaden	2,248	1,554	50.5	45.6	62	48	52	18,679	28
Norrestad	2,168	1,282	57.5	23.8	58	21	79	15,966	26
S:t Olov	1,480	1,086	48.1	50.4	78	70	30	24,638	38
Sandvågen	1,223	1,009	46.7	50.9	70	75	25	20,235	24
Svaneholm	2,120	1,698	34.0	65.4	87	90	10	30,743	54
Ven	370	373	41.9	57.5	82	91	9	24,915	51
Västra Fäladen	1,691	1,431	50.9	47.3	79	72	28	22,040	31
Weibullsholm	2,295	1,394	52.1	41.2	60	33	67	18,087	27
Source: SVT

== Elections ==
Below are the results since the 1973 municipal reform listed. Between 1988 and 1998 the Sweden Democrats' results were not published by the SCB due to the party's small size nationwide. "Turnout" denotes the percentage of the electorate casting a ballot, but "Votes" only applies to valid ballots cast.

=== Riksdag ===
Year	Turnout	Votes	V	S	MP	C	L	KD	M	SD	ND
1973	92.1	24,196	2.4	57.9	0.0	18.5	6.5	0.8	13.7	0.0	0.0
1976	92.2	24,899	2.2	55.3	0.0	15.5	9.4	0.8	16.5	0.0	0.0
1979	91.3	24,306	2.8	54.6	0.0	8.8	9.7	0.5	22.7	0.0	0.0
1982	92.0	24,245	3.4	56.3	1.3	7.8	4.9	0.5	25.5	0.0	0.0
1985	90.0	23,758	3.4	54.9	1.2	5.3	10.5	0.0	24.4	0.0	0.0
1988	86.0	22,653	3.7	53.0	5.0	5.3	9.2	0.9	22.0	0.0	0.0
1991	85.9	22,912	3.0	45.3	2.0	4.4	6.6	4.2	26.3	0.0	6.0
1994	86.9	23,145	3.6	56.3	3.1	3.4	4.5	1.6	24.5	0.0	2.0
1998	79.6	21,183	8.2	43.9	2.9	2.1	3.8	6.6	25.0	0.0	0.0
2002	77.0	21,382	6.3	44.3	2.5	2.1	13.5	5.7	16.4	6.2	0.0
2006	80.0	23,056	3.9	40.8	2.9	3.0	12.2	2.8	24.2	8.2	0.0
2010	81.8	24,361	4.1	35.8	4.3	2.5	11.7	2.5	28.2	9.9	0.0
2014	81.9	25,354	4.2	37.3	5.0	2.8	7.0	2.0	19.9	18.8	0.0

Blocs

This lists the relative strength of the socialist and centre-right blocs since 1973, but parties not elected to the Riksdag are inserted as "other", including the Sweden Democrats results from 1988 to 2006, but also the Christian Democrats pre-1991 and the Greens in 1982, 1985 and 1991. The sources are identical to the table above. The coalition or government mandate marked in bold formed the government after the election. New Democracy got elected in 1991 but are still listed as "other" due to the short lifespan of the party. "Elected" is the total number of percentage points from the municipality that went to parties who were elected to the Riksdag.

Year	Turnout	Votes	Left	Right	SD	Other	Elected
1973	92.1	24,196	**60.3**	38.7	0.0	1.0	99.0
1976	92.2	24,899	57.5	**41.4**	0.0	1.1	98.9
1979	91.3	24,306	57.4	**41.2**	0.0	1.4	98.6
1982	92.0	24,245	**59.7**	38.2	0.0	2.1	97.9
1985	90.0	23,758	**58.3**	40.2	0.0	1.5	98.5
1988	86.0	22,653	**61.7**	36.5	0.0	1.8	98.2
1991	85.9	22,912	48.3	**41.5**	0.0	10.2	95.8
1994	86.9	23,145	**63.0**	34.0	0.0	3.0	97.0
1998	79.6	21,183	**55.0**	37.5	0.0	7.5	92.5
2002	77.0	21,382	**53.1**	37.7	0.0	9.2	90.8
2006	80.0	23,056	47.6	**42.2**	0.0	10.2	89.8
2010	81.8	24,361	44.2	**44.9**	9.9	1.0	99.0
2014	81.9	25,354	**46.5**	31.7	18.8	3.0	97.0

== International relations ==
=== Twin towns — Sister cities ===
The municipality is twinned with:

- (Denmark) Glostrup Municipality
- (Germany) Plochingen
- (Finland) Kotka
- (Estonia) Võru

== See also ==
- Municipalities of Sweden
