= Asmundtorp =

Locality in Sweden

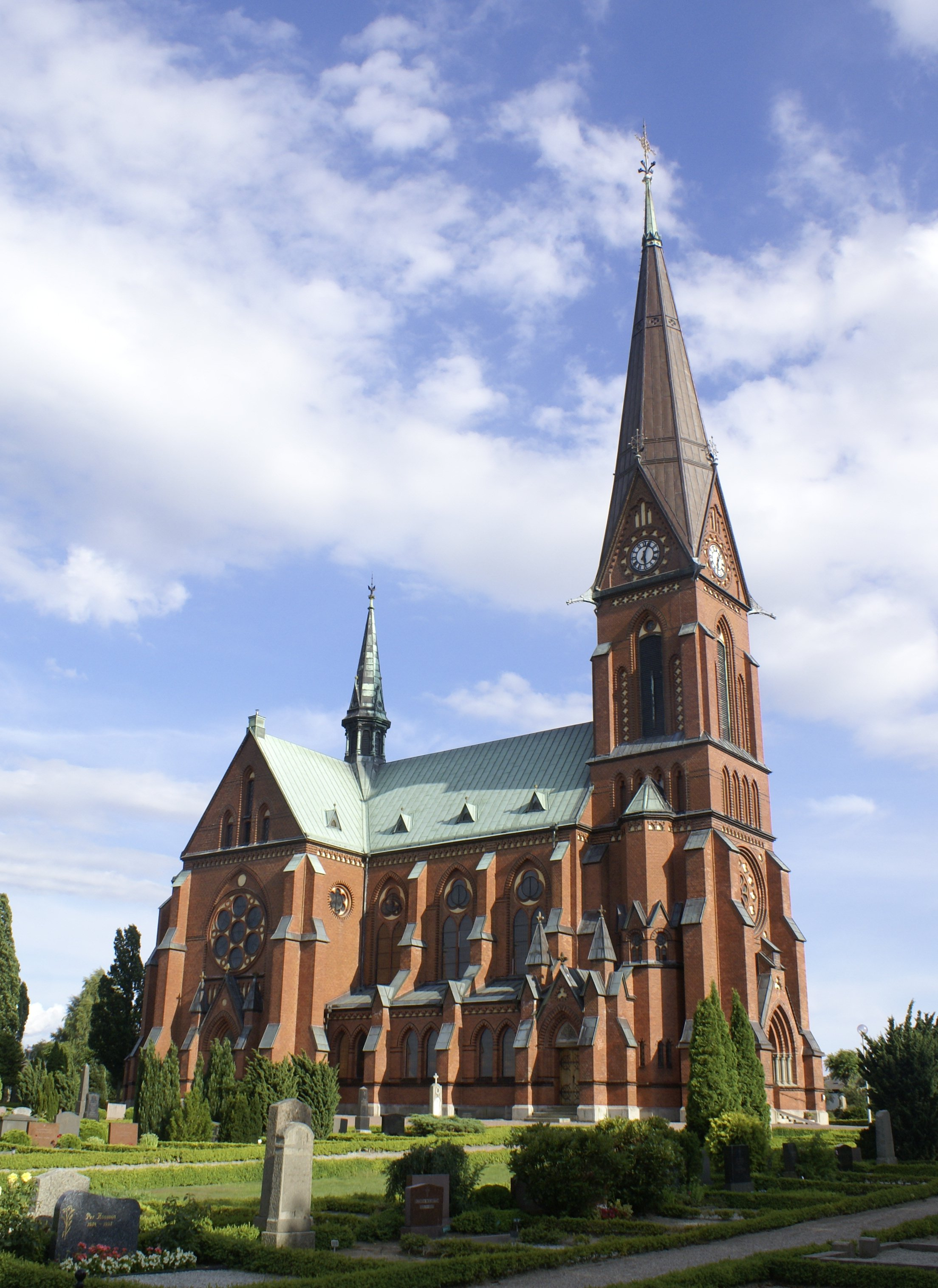
- Asmundstorp Church

- Location within Skåne Location within Sweden
- Coordinates: 55°53′N 12°56′E
- Country: Sweden
- Province: Skåne
- County: Skåne County
- Municipality: Landskrona Municipality

Area
  - Total: 1.18 km^{2} (0.46 sq mi)

Population (31 December 2020)
  - Total: 1,646
  - Density: 1,390/km^{2} (3,610/sq mi)
- Time zone: UTC+1 (CET)
  - Summer (DST): UTC+2 (CEST)

Asmundtorp (Swedish pronunciation: [ˈâsːmɵnˌtɔrp]) is a locality situated in Landskrona Municipality, Skåne County, Sweden with 1,562 inhabitants in 2010. Asmundtorp Church has been described as one of the most accomplished examples of 19th-century church architecture in Skåne.

== Sports ==
The following sports clubs are located in Asmundtorp:

- Asmundtorps IF

The wrestler Olle Anderberg was born here
