= Bosarpasjön =

Lake in Hässleholm Municipality, Sweden

- Lake
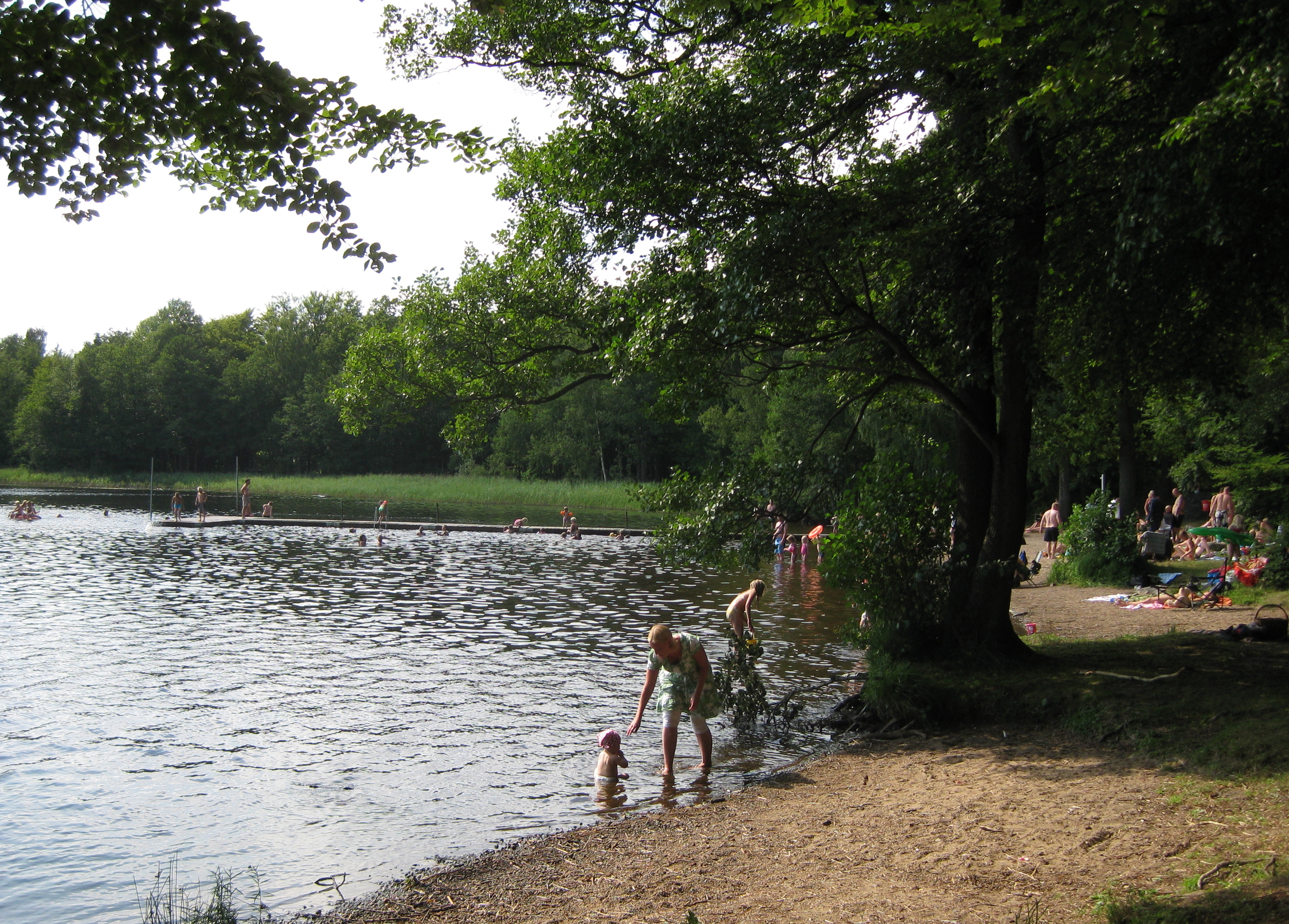
- Bathing area of the lake.
- Interactive map of Bosarpasjön
- Location: Sweden
- Coordinates: 55°57′47.84″N 13°44′45.89″E
- Surface area: 0.741 km^{2} (0.286 sq mi)
- Surface elevation: 116.2 m (381 ft)

Bosarpasjön is a spring lake located just under a mile in the southeast of the locality of Sösdala in the municipality of Hässleholm in Scania county and is part of the main catchment area of the Helge river. The lake has an area of 0.741 square kilometers and has an elevation of 116.2 meters above sea level. During test fishing, european perch, bream, ruffe and pike have been caught in the lake.

The lake is part of the Vramsån River and thus the Helge River's drainage basin, with its own drainage area of 13.2 km^{2}. The lake has been classified as one of the purest in Skåne and a limnological study from 2011 showed that the lake's water, without any treatment, meets the current limit values for being drinkable.

== Animal population ==
The lake's fish species composition is dominated, according to a 2011 test fishing, by bream and roach. Furthermore, the population consists of perch, eurasian carp, mirror carp, pike, ruffe, zander, common rudd, tench, and european eel. The lake is famous for carp fishing. Comparisons between test fishing carried out in 1988 and 2011 confirmed a suspected decline in the fish stock that led to a halt in the sale of fishing licenses from 2010.

The bird species that frequent the lake include great crested grebes, goldeneyes, common terns, mallards, bean geese and greylag geese. The surrounding fauna includes deers, wild boars, european badgers, pine martens, foxes and grass snakes.

== Aquatic lives ==
The color of the water is brown with an average color value of 70 mg Pt/l, with peaks up to 88 mg Pt/l, which means that the lake water is classified as significantly colored. These high values, together with the presence of microalgae, result in low visibility. The water has elevated levels of iron, manganese, aluminum, phosphorus and nitrogen, but is still of good quality by Skåne standards.

== Active interventions ==
Documents from the Lantmäterikontoret in Kristianstad show that on one occasion the outlet of the lake was moved in a westerly direction, which is said to have caused a lowering of the water level. In 1956, the lake was limed, and rainbow trout were implanted in the mid-1960s.

== Recreational environment ==
The area around the lake is considered by the County Administrative Board of Skåne County as a "particularly valuable cultural environment," justified by its significance as a recreational environment since the mid-20th century, with several well-preserved buildings. For instance, at the northern end of the lake, there is a mini golf course established by Sjövikens IF in 1954. South of the lake lies Bosarp's summer village with close to 50 developed plots.

== Sub-catchment area ==
Bosarpasjön is part of the sub-basin (620519–137242) that SMHI calls Mynnar i Vramsån. The average altitude is 139 meters above sea level and the area is 19.39 square kilometers. There are no catchment areas upstream; the catchment area is the highest point. The watercourse draining the catchment area has tributary order 3, which means that the water flows through a total of 3 watercourses before reaching the sea after 51 kilometers. The catchment area consists mostly of forest (48%), open land (14%) and agriculture (29%). The catchment area has 1.23 square kilometres of water surface, giving it a lake percentage of 1.5%.

== Fishery and reserves ==
The following fish have been caught in the lake during test fishing:

- European perch
- Bream
- Ruffe
- Pike
- Zander
- Roach
- Tench
