= Annelöv Church =

- Annelövs kyrka
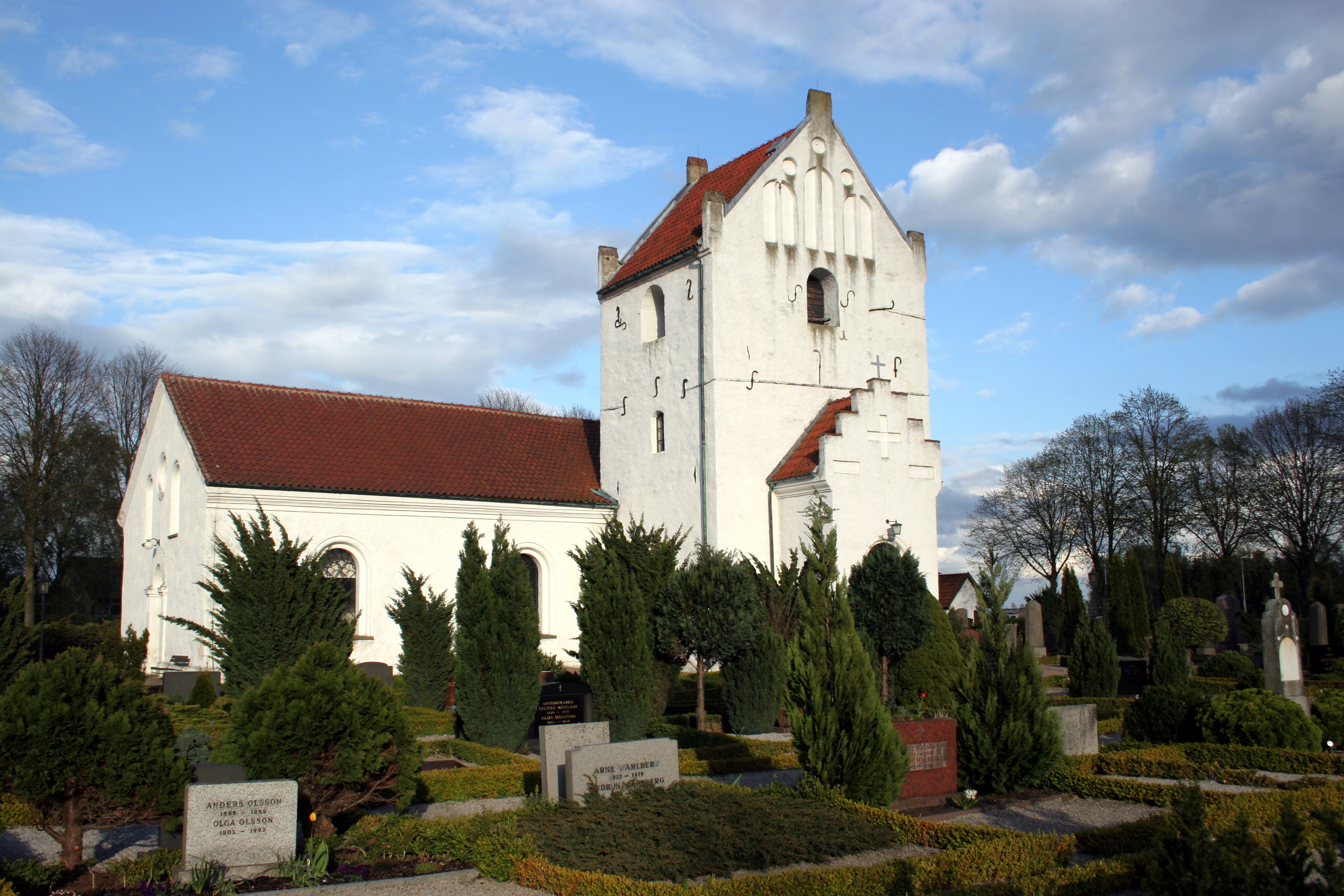
- Annelöv Church

- 55°50′10″N 13°01′18″E
- Country: Sweden
- Denomination: Church of Sweden

Administration
- Diocese: Lund

Annelöv Church (Swedish: Annelövs kyrka) is a church in Annelöv in the Swedish province Scania. It was built during the 12th century but has been much altered since.

== History and appearance ==
During archaeological excavations in the 1960s, evidence was found that a wooden stave church was the first church to be built at the site. The present stone church was built at the end of the 12th century. It was built in a Romanesque tradition with nave, choir and apse. The tower was built during the 14th century, and a church porch during the 15th century. Brick vaults supporting the ceiling of the church were also constructed in the 15th century, although they were replaced with a wooden barrel vault during the 19th century. In 1829–1830, a northern transept was added, and approximately ten years later the medieval church porch was demolished. The church underwent further changes in 1966–1968, when the vaults of the church were replaced once more and the church was renovated. During this work, several graves, including pre-Christian, were discovered under the floor of the church.

The altarpiece of the church is from the 1620s, and its central subject is the Last Supper. The pulpit dates from c. 1580. The stained glass window in the apse is made in 1970 by artist Bertil Sandegård.
