= Landskrona Town Hall =

Town hall in Sweden

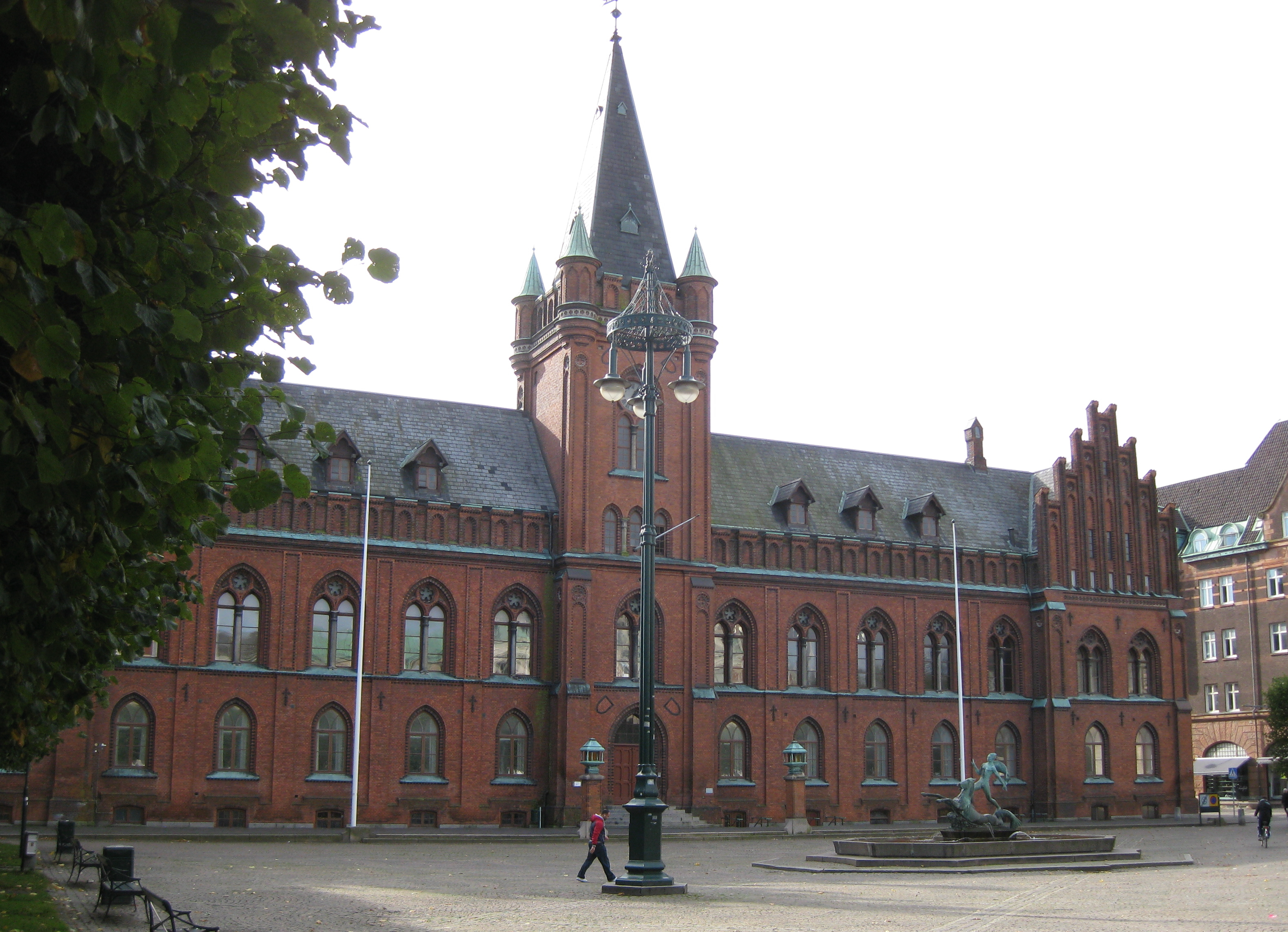
- Interactive map of the Landskrona Town Hall area

General information
- Location: Rådhustorget; Landskrona Sweden
- Coordinates: 55°52′12.2″N 12°49′47.8″E
- Construction started: 1882
- Completed: 1884

Landskrona Town Hall (Swedish: Landskrona rådhus) is a town hall located in Landskrona. The town hall was inaugurated in the year 1884 after construction had started in 1882. The historical building has been designed by the Danish architect Ove Pedersen and is primarily used for Landskrona municipal council meetings.

In the same place as the current town hall was previously an older medieval town hall, which was demolished to make room for the new building. The former building had served as a town hall since the middle of the 15th century.

== Landskrona Town Hall Square ==
Just outside the town hall is the city's primary square, the Town Hall Square (Swedish: "Rådhustorget"), which is known for its significant market trade, among other things. The square is layered with a paving of artistic character as the view from above indicates a distinct pattern. Additional artistic elements are found in the statue Västanvind (West Wind in English) from 1929, designed by Anders Olsson.
