= Kvärlöv =

- Location within Skåne Location within Sweden
- Coordinates: 55°50′N 13°00′E
- Country: Sweden
- Province: Skåne
- County: Skåne County
- Municipality: Landskrona Municipality

Area
  - Total: 0.36 km^{2} (0.14 sq mi)

Population (31 December 2010)
  - Total: 226
  - Density: 619/km^{2} (1,600/sq mi)
- Time zone: UTC+1 (CET)
  - Summer (DST): UTC+2 (CEST)

Kvärlöv is a locality situated in Landskrona Municipality, Skåne County, Sweden with 226 inhabitants in 2010.
