= Annelöv =

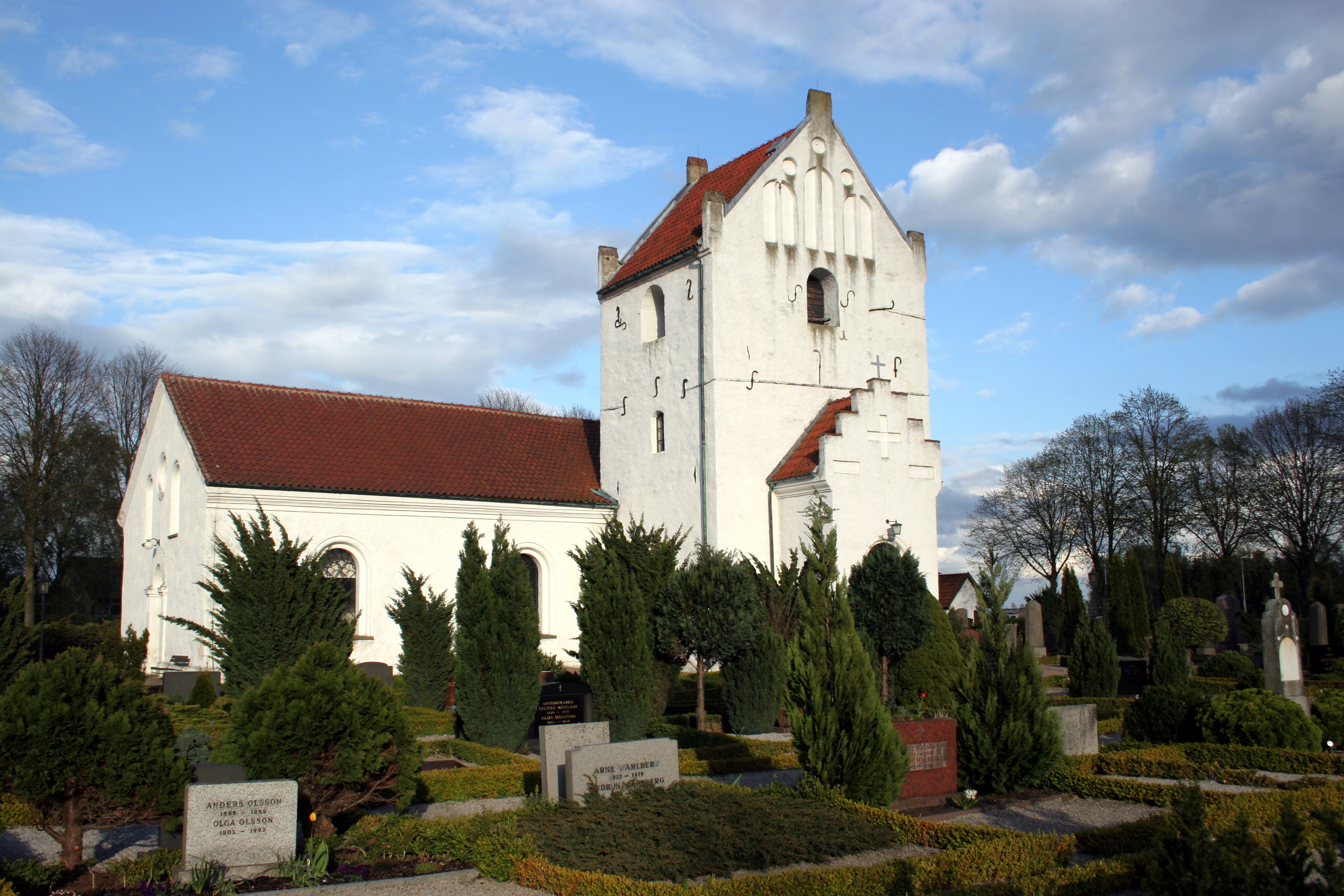
- Annelöv Church

- Location within Skåne Location within Sweden
- Coordinates: 55°50′N 13°01′E
- Country: Sweden
- Province: Skåne
- County: Skåne County
- Municipality: Landskrona Municipality

Area
  - Total: 0.33 km^{2} (0.13 sq mi)

Population (31 December 2010)
  - Total: 380
  - Density: 1,159/km^{2} (3,000/sq mi)
- Time zone: UTC+1 (CET)
  - Summer (DST): UTC+2 (CEST)

Annelöv is a locality situated in Landskrona Municipality, Skåne County, Sweden.

== Background and History ==
Annelöv Church was built in the 12th century but was preceded by a stave church. Annelöv was founded during the Middle Ages as a linear village. The church is from the 1100 century. The village was established along thoroughfare street and this is still preserved. Annelöv was once a major center for part of the county and the neighboring counties. Here there have been a number of shops and artisans, school, poor and prison, marketplace and which also housed the sessions-hall and ride station. Enskiftet was conducted in 1806, and nine "homestead" or farms were then sealed in the village while all other farms were moved out. Of the economic map available from 1917 you can see that out of seven large farms in the village were only Ryttargården and Hästängen left. Hästängen is located just north of the Ryttargården. Annelöv had several common grounds. On these lands were, for example, gravel - and clay quarry, marketplace. And there are some commons as the village community to look, but is available to everyone in the village. The most common name is the place where a committee "Galgbacken" there. Gallows has a renowned history. Because Onsjö County District Courts Center was in Annelöv was also a place of execution - the gallows. Here, many have seen the end of their lives.

== Overview ==
Annelöv village is located in Sweden's rural countryside. It has a population of about 850 inhabitants. The village school collaboration - Annebro which is an amalgamation of the school grounds and Annelöv Dösjebro. Kavlinge stands as the principal of the school but Annelöv included in Landskrona city. The environment in and around schools is also utilized in the teaching which also creates quality.

The train station is only 2 km from the village center Annelöv, departures are frequent with 1-2 times per hour in both directions towards the Lund / Malmö and Landskrona / Helsingborg. Commuting time to Lund is about 15 minutes and Malmö 25 minutes. Bicycle and pedestrian paths to the station and between the villages located far from traffic, which creates a good and safe road.

The villages have some leisure activities, including nature walks for recreation and exercise. There are two highly active compounds Equestrian Association in Annelöv with its own riding stables / paddock, and arrangement of a number of major competitions and in Dösjebro Football Association who have a strong commitment. In Annelöv is also an active bowls club and a Tennis Club. Even in nearby villages Kävlinge / Hofterup / Löddekopinge all only 10 minutes away offers a very wide range of leisure activities. Center Syd shopping center with its large marketplace is only 7 minutes away. The distance to Landskrona is less than 20 km and to Lund just over 20 km. In Annelöv is a pizzeria that also offers some groceries. The local Barsebäcks resort includes golf course and country walks.
