= Tofta, Landskrona Municipality =

Coordinates: 55.867°N 12.925°E

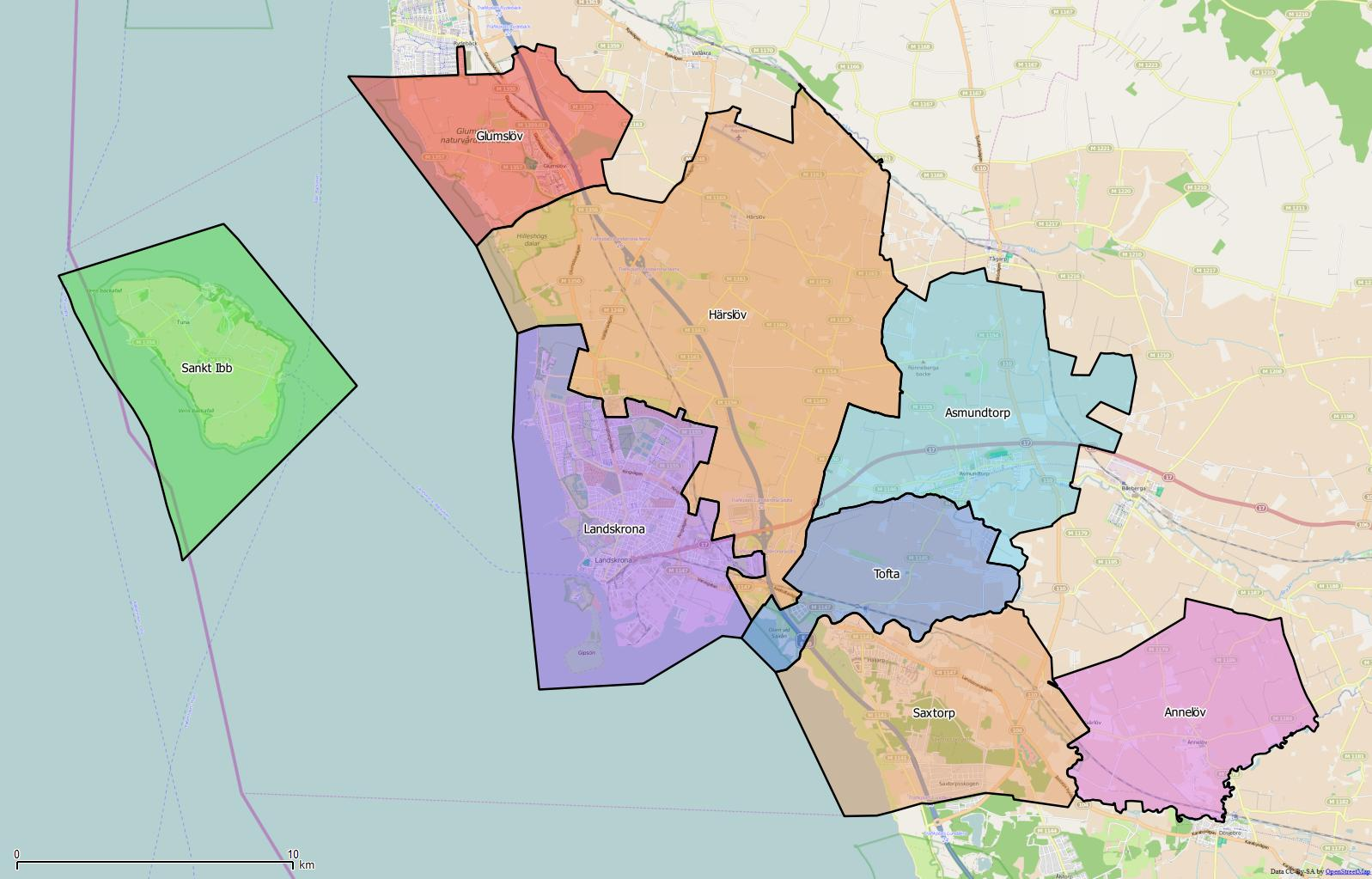
Tofta (dark blue) is one of eight districts in Landskrona Municipality

Tofta is a district in Landskrona Municipality and in Skåne County with 802 inhabitants (2020).

The district was established in 2016. Before 1969 it was known as the Tofta parish. It encompasses some parts of the Landskrona urban area.

== Notes ==
- SFS 2015:493, adjusted in SFS 2015:698 Statute on districts.
