= Glumslöv =

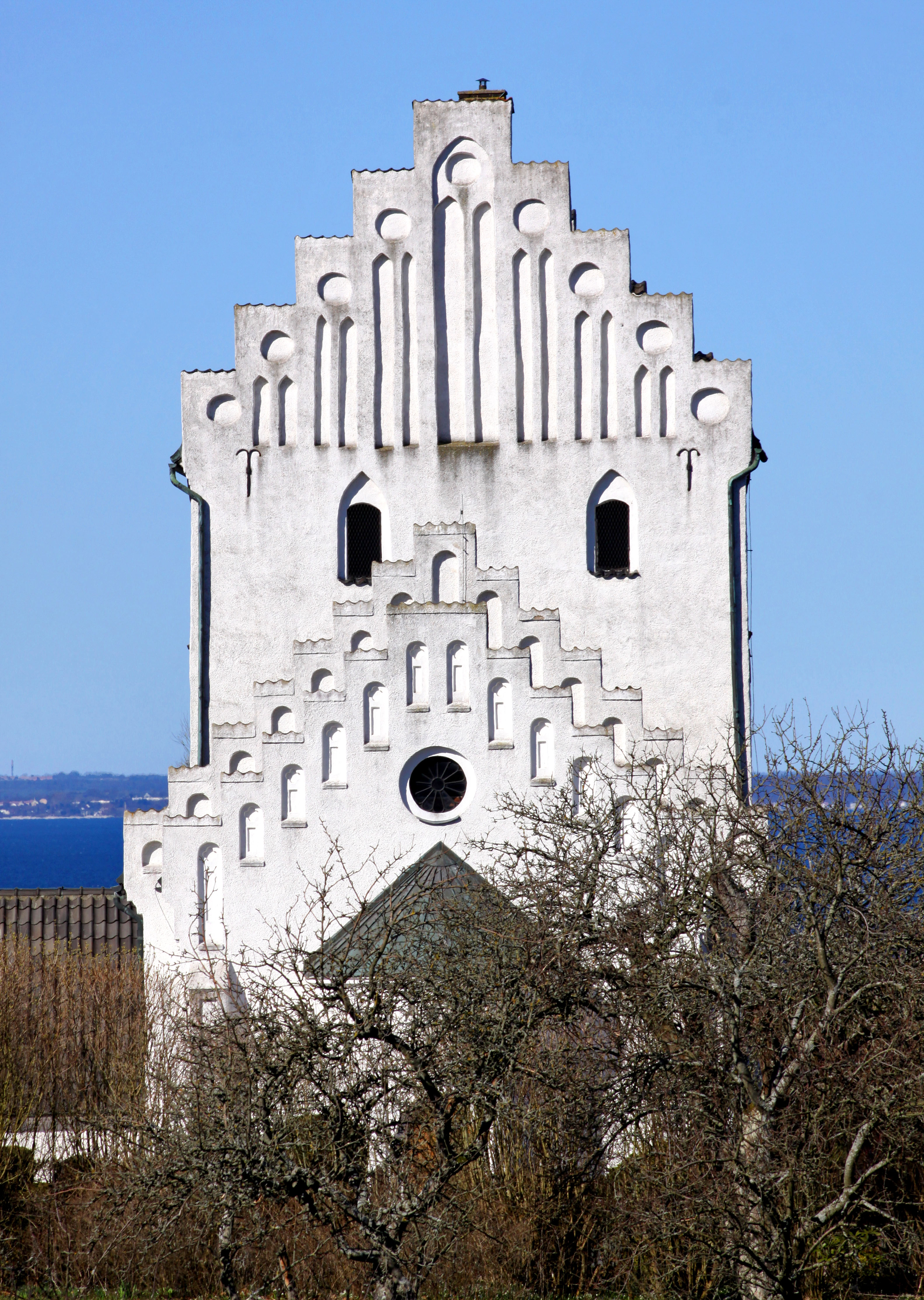
- Glumslöv Church 2011

- Location within Skåne Location within Sweden
- Coordinates: 55°57′N 12°49′E
- Country: Sweden
- Province: Skåne
- County: Skåne County
- Municipality: Landskrona Municipality

Area
  - Total: 1.24 km^{2} (0.48 sq mi)

Population (July, 2026)
  - Total: 2,438
  - Density: 1,966/km^{2} (5,090/sq mi)
- Time zone: UTC+1 (CET)
  - Summer (DST): UTC+2 (CEST)

Glumslöv is a locality situated in Landskrona Municipality, Skåne County, Sweden with 1,994 inhabitants in 2010. Notable natives from the area include Björn Strid & Peter Wildoer. Nearby to Glumslöv is Maryhill Estate which is a large, scenic, hotel and restaurant where weekly events are held. By the coast of Glumslöv the small sleepy town of Ålabodarna can be found which is a fishing village first mentioned in literature 1699 by Malmöhus läns mantalslängd.
