= Sösdala =

- Location within Scania Location within Sweden Location within European Union
- Coordinates: 56°02′N 13°40′E
- Country: Sweden
- Province: Scania
- County: Scania County
- Municipality: Hässleholm Municipality

Area
  - Total: 1.97 km^{2} (0.76 sq mi)

Population (31 December 2010)
  - Total: 1,811
  - Density: 921/km^{2} (2,390/sq mi)
- Time zone: UTC+1 (CET)
  - Summer (DST): UTC+2 (CEST)

Sösdala (Swedish pronunciation: [ˈsø̂ːsˌdɑːla]) is a locality situated in Hässleholm Municipality, Scania County, Sweden with 1,811 inhabitants in 2010.
